= Gyejoksan (Daejeon) =

Mountain of South Korea

Highest point
- Elevation: 429 m (1,407 ft)
- Coordinates: 36°23′05″N 127°26′21″E

Geography
- Location: South Korea

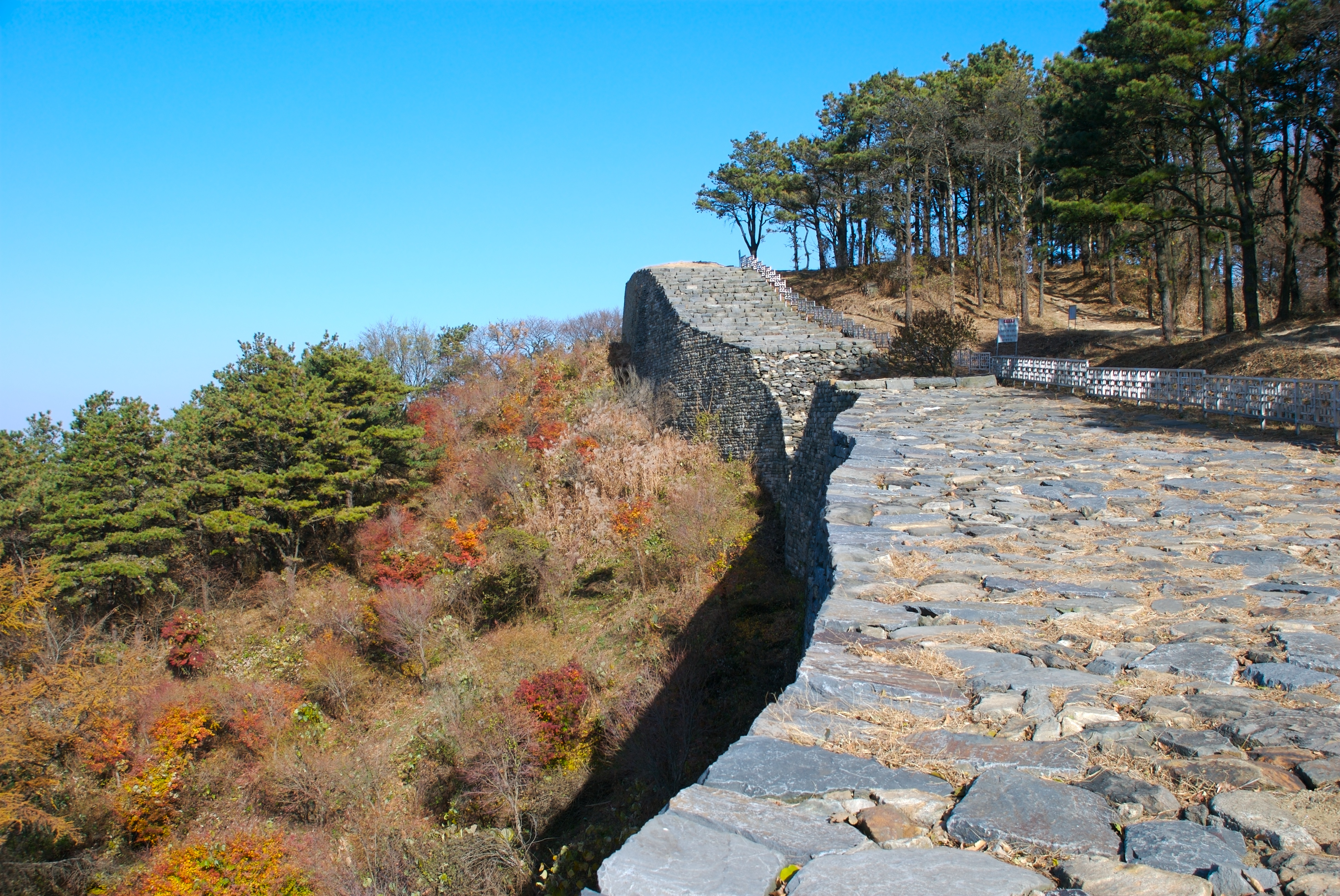
Photograph of Gyejok Fortress at Daejeon, South Korea

Gyejoksan (Korean: 계족산) is a mountain of Daejeon, South Korea. It has an elevation of 429 metres. The mountains are spread like chicken feet. In the west, Sungjae Mountain (390 m) stands side by side. It is made up of mountain peaks in four round circles, followed by mountains by Kwangbyeongsan, Usanbong, and Gahaksan. The mountain is the location of Jangdong Green Bath which opened in June 1995.

Gyejoksan is one of the eight popular places for sightseers which are designated by city government. Those eight sights include the mountains Sikjangsan, Bomunsan, Gubongsan, and Jangtaesan, the lake Daecheonghosu, as well as Yuseong Spa, and Expo Science Park.

== See also ==
- List of mountains of Korea
