= Park Beom-kye =

South Korean politician

- 박범계
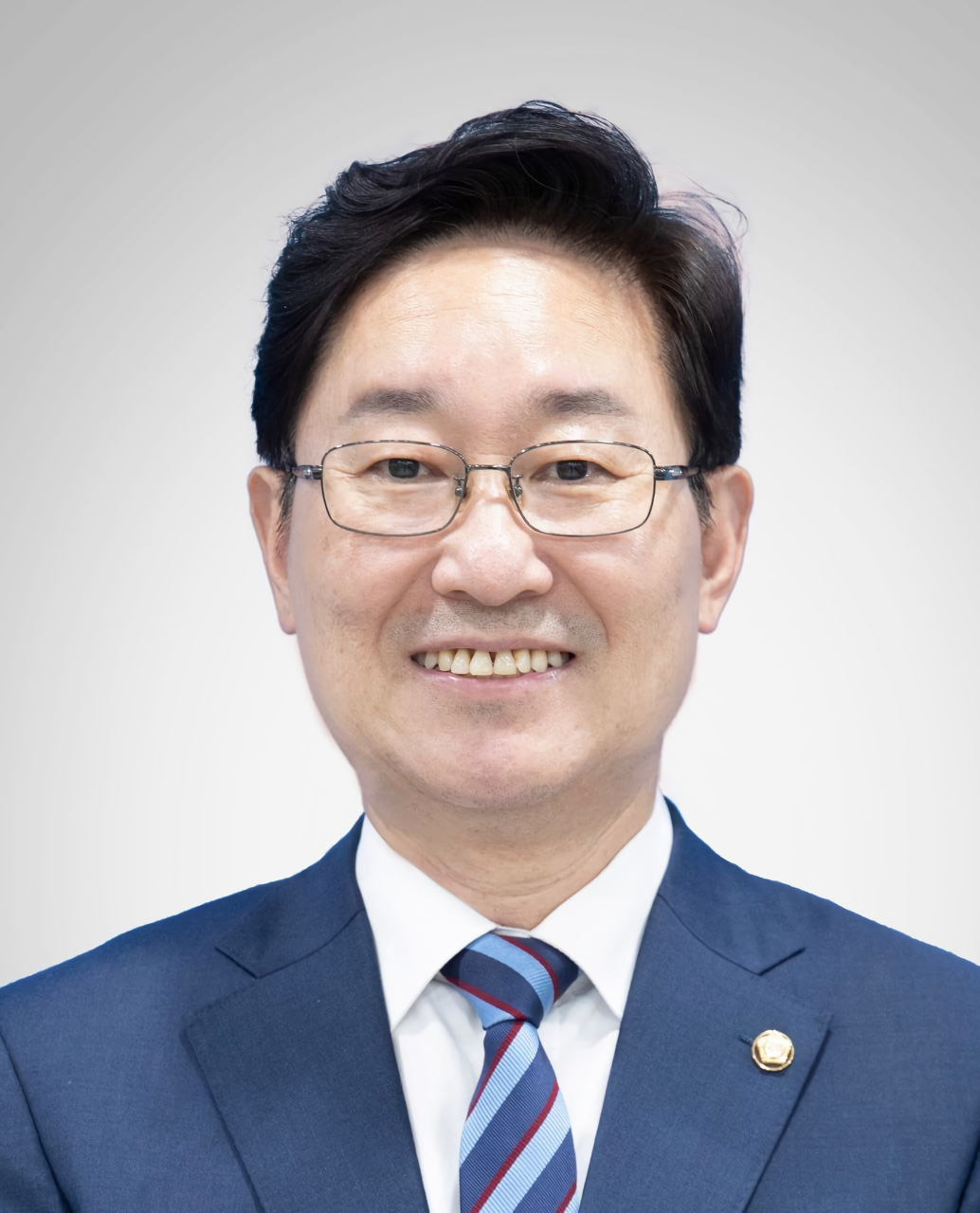

Minister of Justice
- In office 28 January 2021 – 9 May 2022
- President: Moon Jae-in
- Prime Minister: Chung Sye-kyun; Hong Nam-ki (acting); Kim Boo-kyum
- Preceded by: Choo Mi-ae
- Succeeded by: Lee No-gong (acting); Han Dong-hoon

Member of the National Assembly
- Incumbent
- Assumed office 30 May 2012
- Preceded by: Lee Jae-seon
- Constituency: Daejeon Seo B

Personal details
- Born: 27 April 1963 (age 63) Yeongdong County, South Korea
- Party: Democratic
- Education: Yonsei University (LLB); Hanbat National University (BEcon)

Park Beom-kye (Korean: 박범계; Hanja: 朴範界; born 27 April 1963) is a South Korean politician who has served in the National Assembly representing Daejeon since 2012. He also served as the Minister of Justice under President Moon Jae-in from 2021 to 2022.

After passing the bar exam and completing subsequent training at the Judicial Research and Training Institute, Park began his career as a judge at Seoul Central District Court. In 1998 he was transferred to Jeonju District Court and in 2001 to Daejeon District Court.

In October 2002, Park ended his career at the court to join the presidential campaign of Roh Moo-hyun, who was expected to lose the election. After Roh's victory in the 2002 South Korean presidential election, Park continued to work for Roh as a member of his transition team and as a secretary at the Office of the President.

After failing to gain his party's nomination for the general election in 2004 or by-election in 2007, Park finally became the party's candidate in the 2008 election. In 2012 he ran again for the same constituency and has represented Daejeon in the National Assembly since.

After operation "Miracle" in late August 2021 successfully evacuated about 400 people from Afghanistan who worked with the Korean embassy, KOICA and Korean military missions, Park said his ministry would submit an amendment to Immigration Act to parliament so that "people who have made special contributions to Korea or who have expanded its common good" can file for a long-term F2 visa.

== Education ==
Park holds two bachelor's degrees - one in law from Yonsei University and the other in economics from Hanbat National University.

== Electoral history ==
Election	Year	District	Party affiliation	Votes	Percentage of votes	Results
18th National Assembly General Election	2008	Daejeon Seo B	Democratic Party	22,448	26.41%	Lost
19th National Assembly General Election	2012	Daejeon Seo B	Democratic United Party	46,908	43.63%	Won
20th National Assembly General Election	2016	Daejeon Seo B	Democratic Party	56,819	49.53%	Won
21st National Assembly General Election	2020	Daejeon Seo B	Democratic Party	70,708	57.50%	Won
22nd National Assembly General Election	2024	Daejeon Seo B	Democratic Party	65,340	54.58%	Won
