= Institute of Information Technology Advancement =

South Korean government organization

- Type: Government
- Established: 1999
- Location: Daejeon, South Korea
- Website: www.iita.re.kr

The Institute of Information Technology Advancement (IITA) is a South Korea government organization under the National IT Industry Promotion Agency (NIPA), working in the fields of research and development (R&D) and information technology (IT).

Many IT-projects in Korea are funded by the IITA.

== IITA Scholarship ==
IITA also offers the Korean government's "IITA Scholarship Program" to qualified international graduate students enrolled in Korean universities in majors such as IT, computer engineering, computer science, electronics and related fields. Applications are possible twice a year (in spring and fall). Those already enrolled in a Korean university must have an academic advisor. All applications must be made through the participating schools on behalf of the students. The scholarships cover tuition fees and all other expenses for two years (masters) or four years (for a PhD degree).
