= Daejeoncheon =

River in Daejeon, South Korea

Coordinates: 36°21′N 127°24′E

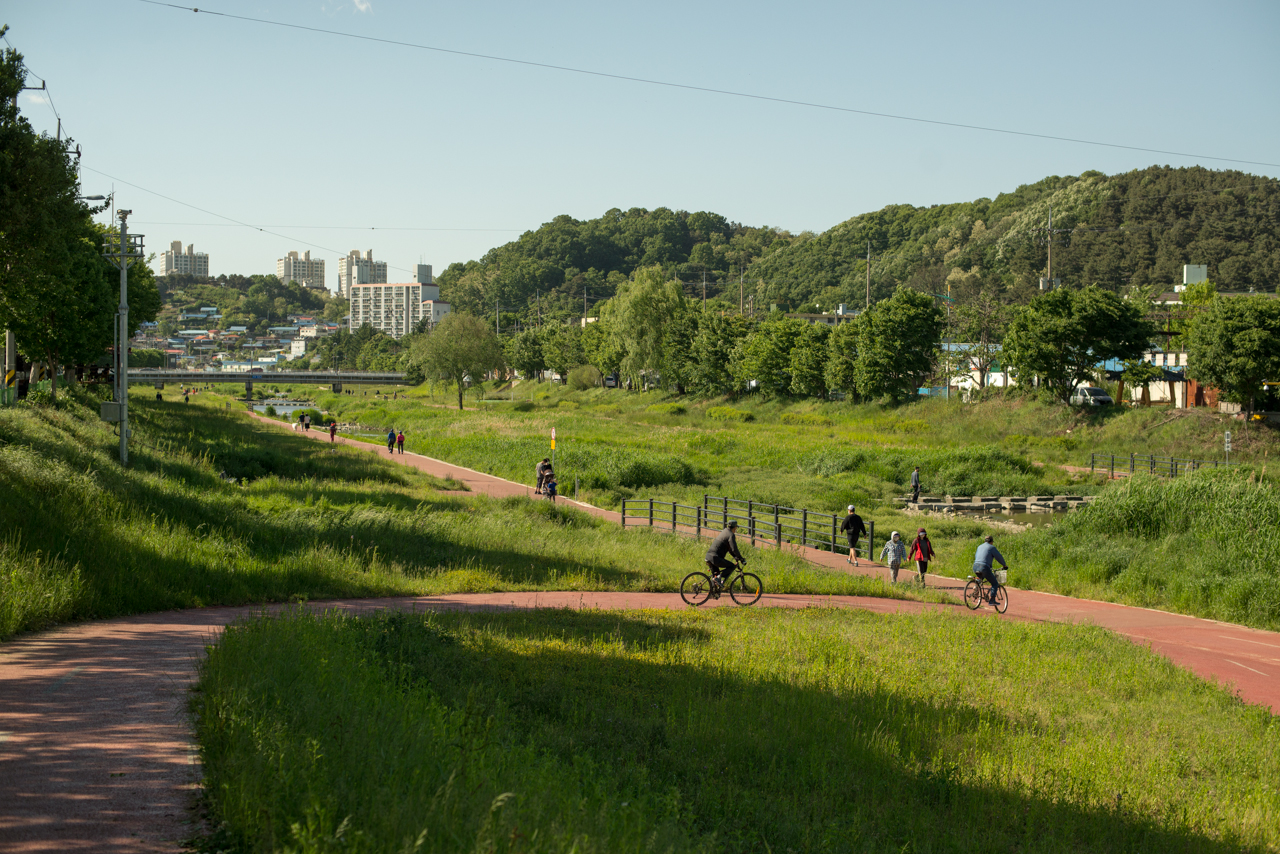
Cyclists and pedestrians along Daejeoncheon in 2021

The Daejeoncheon (Korean: 대전천; Hanja: 大田川) is a river in South Korea within the Geum River system, and one of the three major rivers (including Gapcheon and Yudeungcheon) that flow through Daejeon. The river originates within Daejeon, at Mr. Manin and Mt. Bipa, approximately 15 km (9 mi) to the south of the city center, and flows to the north through the city's old downtown, dividing the districts of Jung-gu and Dong-gu, before merging with the Yudeongcheon river.

== Restoration and access ==
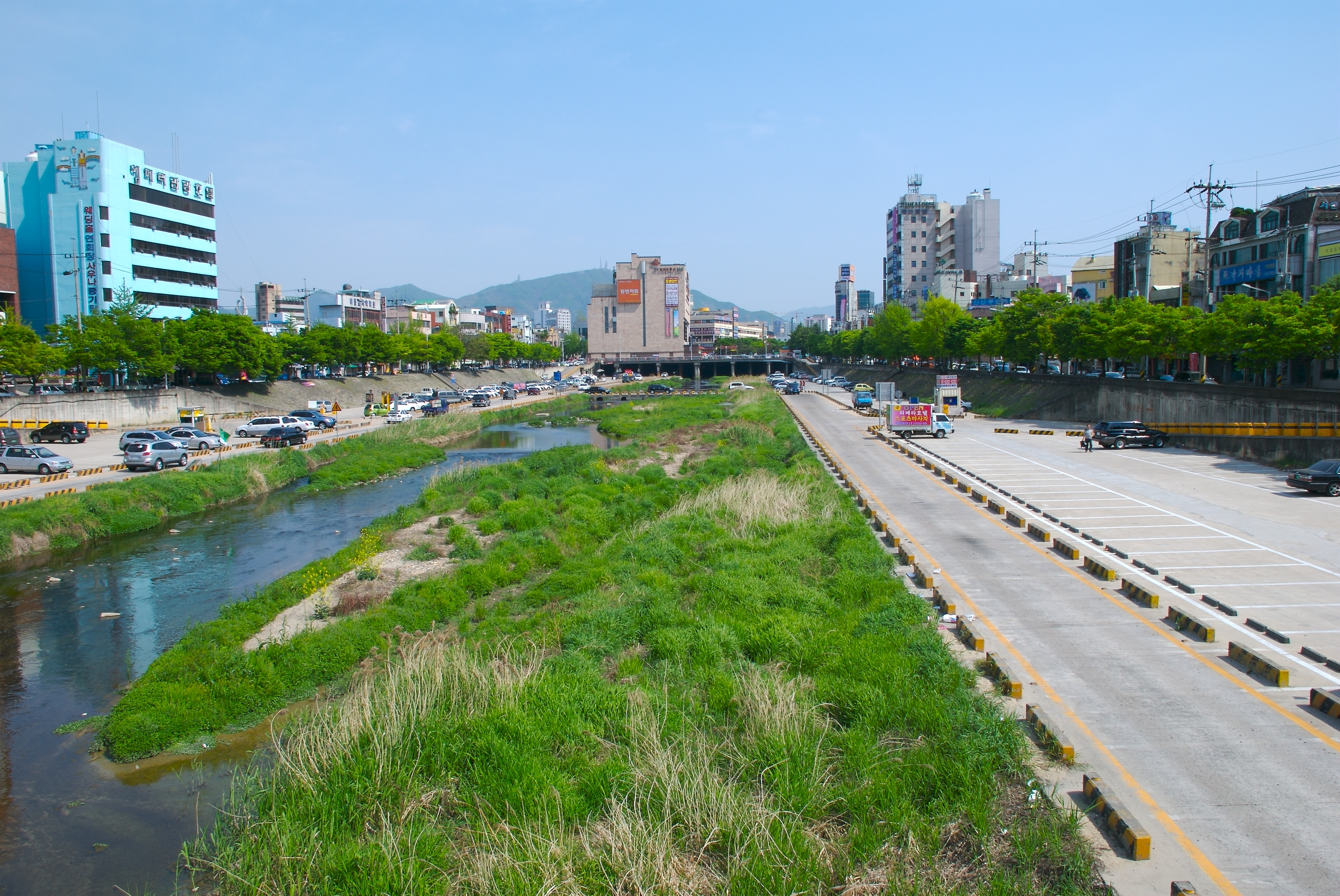
Daejeoncheon in 2007, near Central Street in Dong-gu

The Daejeoncheon was previously used as a parking lot, but has undergone substantial restoration in recent decades, removing a large department store which covered the river, and removing motor vehicle access and parking lots at several points. New infrastructure includes cycling and walking paths, along with natural areas to promote riparian ecosystem regrowth. The restoration is ongoing, and has enabled the river to provide ecosystem services such as wildlife habitat for various pollinators, heron, and waterfowl, while also serving as a major walking and cycling route between multiple residential and commercial areas.

== See also ==
- List of rivers of Korea
