= Joon Park (artist) =

American painter (born 1989)

- Born: 박준언, Park Joon Un; November 19, 1989 (age 36); Daejeon, South Korea
- Education: San Jose State University
- Known for: Painting
- Movement: Pop Surrealism, Trompe-l'œil
- Website: novemberpark89.com

Joon Park (also known as JP Novark, Korean:박준언, born November 19, 1989, in Daejeon, South Korea) is an American pop surrealist painter and an experienced trompe-l'œil artist. He is currently located in the Bay Area.
