= Bomunsan =

Mountain park in Daejeon, South Korea

Coordinates: 36°17′47″N 127°25′19″E

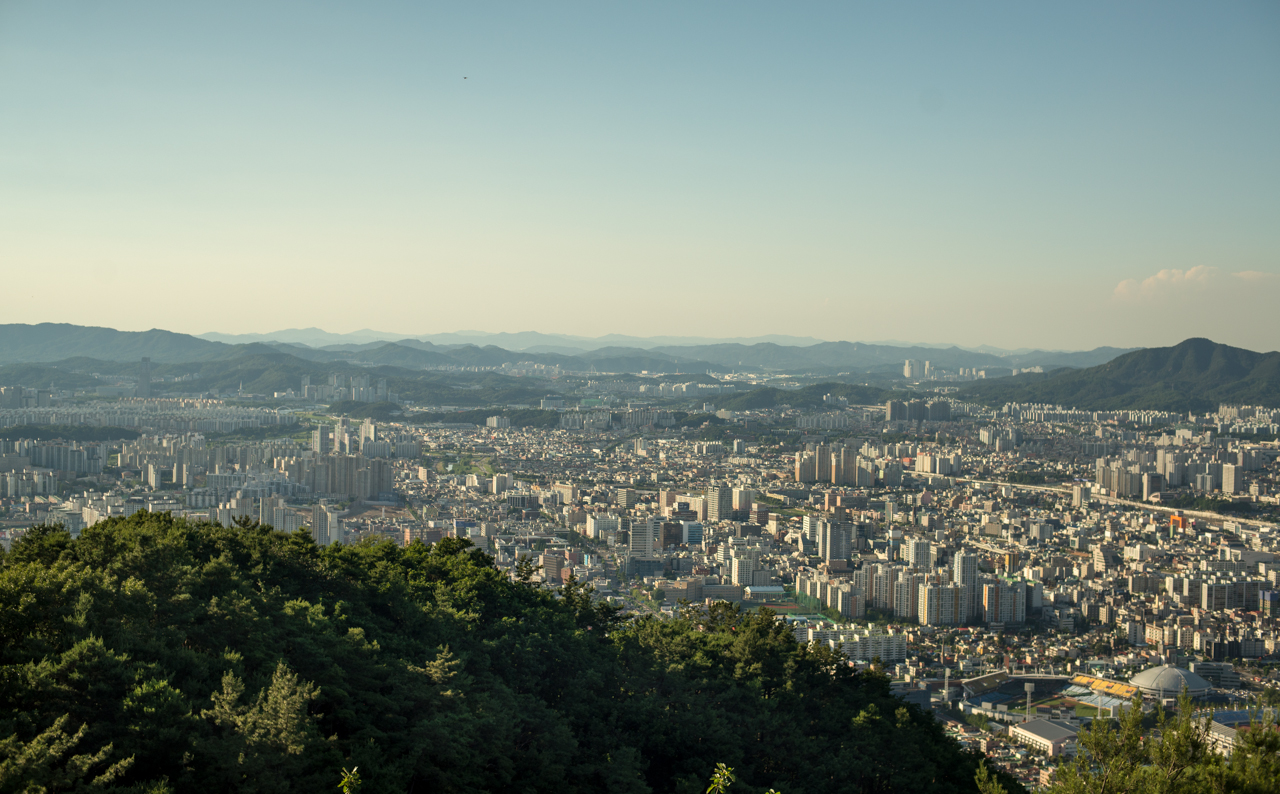
View of Daejeon from Bomunsan

Bomunsan (Korean: 보문산; Hanja: 寶文山), is an urban mountain park in the south of Daejeon in Korea, with a peak elevation of 457.6 m (1,501 ft). Known as one of the Eight Great Views Daejeon, Bomunsan was established as a park in 1965, and contains multiple culture, sports, and heritage sites, some dating back as far as the Bronze Age.

The vicinity of the mountain is home to multiple amusement, sports, and health facilities including an outdoor concert hall, a Youth Square, and O-World amusement park and zoo, and the Bomunsan Forest Healing Center. Cultural heritage sites include the figure of a seated Buddha figure carved into the mountainside (c. late Goryeo dynasty), and the reconstructed ruins of an ancient fortress, as well as multiple Buddhist temples both within and bordering the park.

== Present condition ==
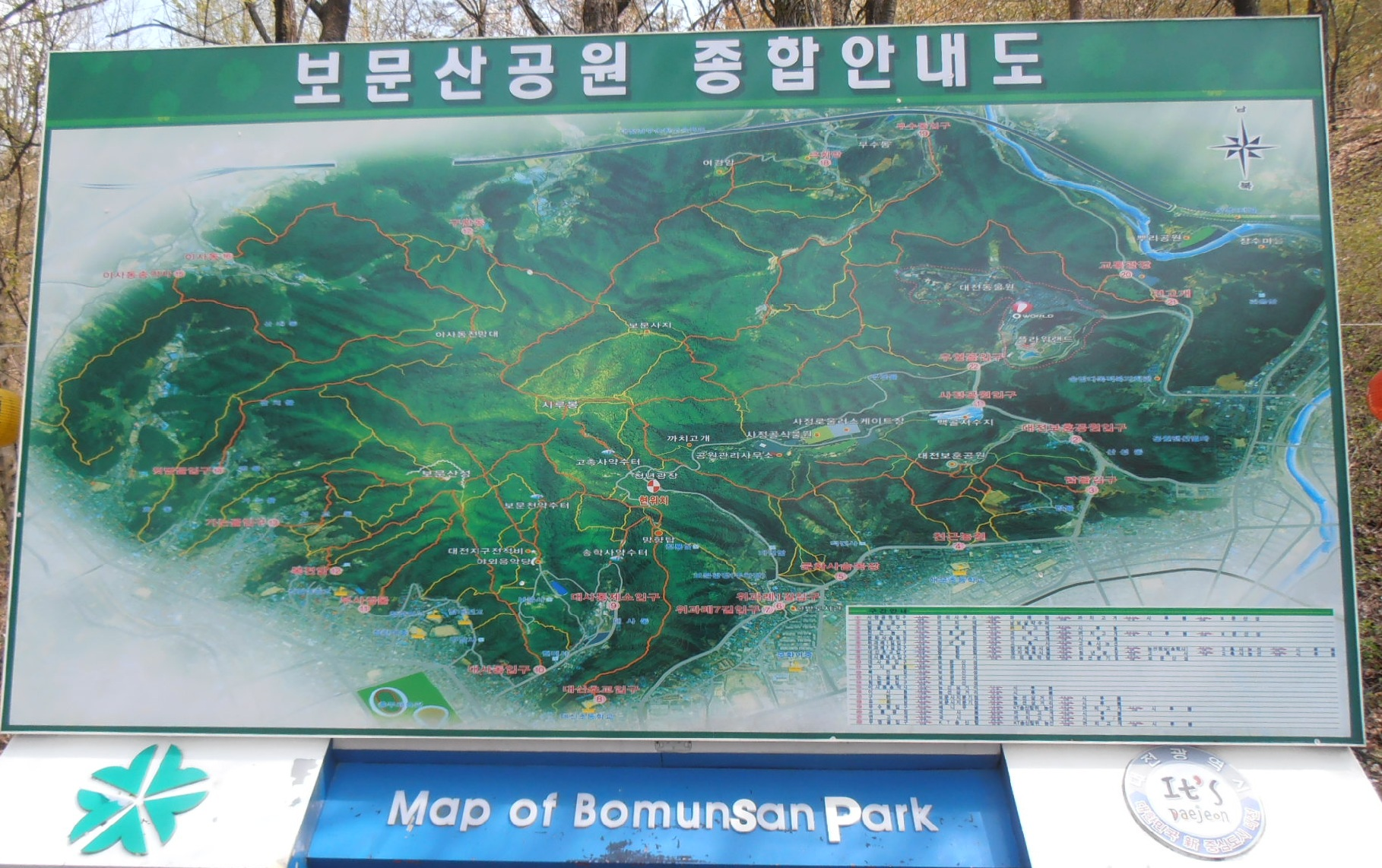
Bomunsan map

There are 10 official trails, most of them easily accessible directly from the city by foot and public transportation, with trail heads in 11 neighborhoods in the city's central (Jung-gu) district, though most signage is in Korean only. Hiking is popular year-round with diverse natural landscapes and approximately 10 mineral springs. At various times of year, locals enjoy walking through landscapes of cherry blossoms, azaleas, hydrangea, and the fall foliage of various maple trees. Municipal government of Daejeon uses the mountain and its infrastructure to organize numerous local events.
