= Jangtaesan =

Mountain in North Chungcheong Province, South Korea

Coordinates: 37°04′N 127°54′E

Jangtaesan (Korean: 장태산) is a mountain located in the Jangan-dong neighbourhood of Daejeon, South Korea. It is within the Jangtaesan Natural Recreation Forest, which is known for its dawn redwood (Metasequoia) trees.
