= Yuseong Hot Spring =

Thermal spring in Daejeon, South Korea

- 유성온천
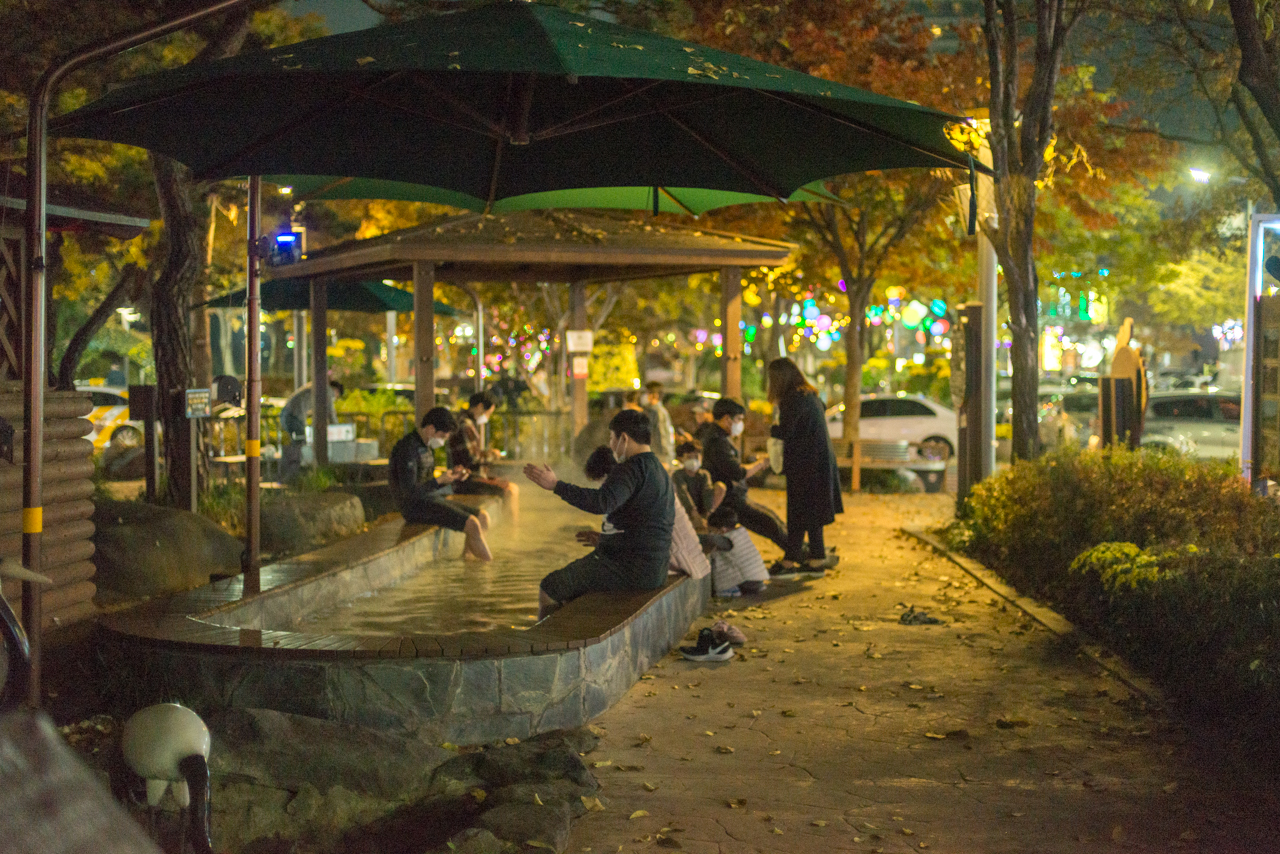
- Yuseong Foot Spa at night
- Interactive map of Yuseong Hot Spring
- Type: Public Hot Spring
- Location: Yuseong-gu, Daejeon, South Korea
- Coordinates: 36.3550°N 127.3460°E
- Opened: October 5, 2007
- Website: https://www.yuseong.go.kr/eng/

- Yuseong Hot Spring
- Hangul: 유성온천
- Hanja: 儒城溫泉
- RR: Yuseong oncheon
- MR: Yusŏng onch'ŏn

Yuseong Hot Spring (Korean: 유성온천) is a natural hot spring located in an urban park in Yuseong-gu, Daejeon, South Korea. The spa is open year-round. The park features fountains, streams, colorful lighting, a water wheel, and a vending machine for towels, and is well frequented by locals.

A footbath experience center is open to the public free of charge. The public Foot Bath Experience Center opened on October 5, 2007. The foot spa consists of a series of shallow outdoor wading pools approximately 10 inches (25 cm) deep. The main pool has an irregular outline 60 feet (18 m) long and averaging roughly 4 feet (1.2 m) wide between edges finished with stones and benches allowing visitors and passersby to sit while dabbling their feet in the water. Parts of the bottom are lined with smooth rock and pebble to provide a foot massage to those strolling through the water. A gazebo covers one end of the wading pool.

The spring water in Yuseong Hot Spring originate from between 215 and 450 meters deep, are soft and mildly alkaline (pH 7.5 to 8.5) with a high mineral concentration including silicate (SiO2), known for softening the skin. The water temperature is also relatively high, ranging from 41 degrees to 57 degrees Celsius.

According to Dongguk Yeoji Seungram (Book of Geography), King Taejo stopped here on his way to Shindoan, Gyeryongsan Mountain, to find a new capital for Joseon. Records also indicate that King Taejong of Joseon bathed here in 1393 and then observed military training, suggesting that by the dawn of the Joseon Dynasty, the hot springs were already being used by kings. In 1913, the Japanese arrived and built four baths and two special bathhouses, marking the completion of the modern Mannyeonjang hot spring facility, marking the development of Yuseong Hot Springs as it is today. There are also stories of former President Park Chung-hee visiting Yuseong for a hot spring bath.

Designated a special tourist zone in 1994, the area has a Snow Flower Street lined with white poplar trees resembling snow. It is home to a public hot spring bathhouse, large accommodations such as the Yuseong Hotel, Hotel Riviera, Gyeryong Spatel, Hotel Spapia, and Hotel Adria, as well as entertainment establishments and convenience facilities.

The Yuseong Hot Springs Cultural Festival is held annually in May.

Nearby tourist attractions include Gyeryongsan Mountain, the National Science Museum, the Currency Museum, the Geology Museum, the Prehistoric Museum, Daedeok Research Complex, Daejeon O-World, Hanbat Arboretum, the Korean Law and Culture Promotion Center, Yulim Park, the Gyeryongsan Natural History Museum, Yuseong Country Club, Sutonggol Valley, the Royal Tomb of King Muryeong in Gongju, and Magoksa Temple.

== See also ==
- List of hot springs
- Bugok
- Heosimcheong Spa
