= Daejeon =

City in South Korea

- Metropolitan City
- Daejeon Metropolitan City
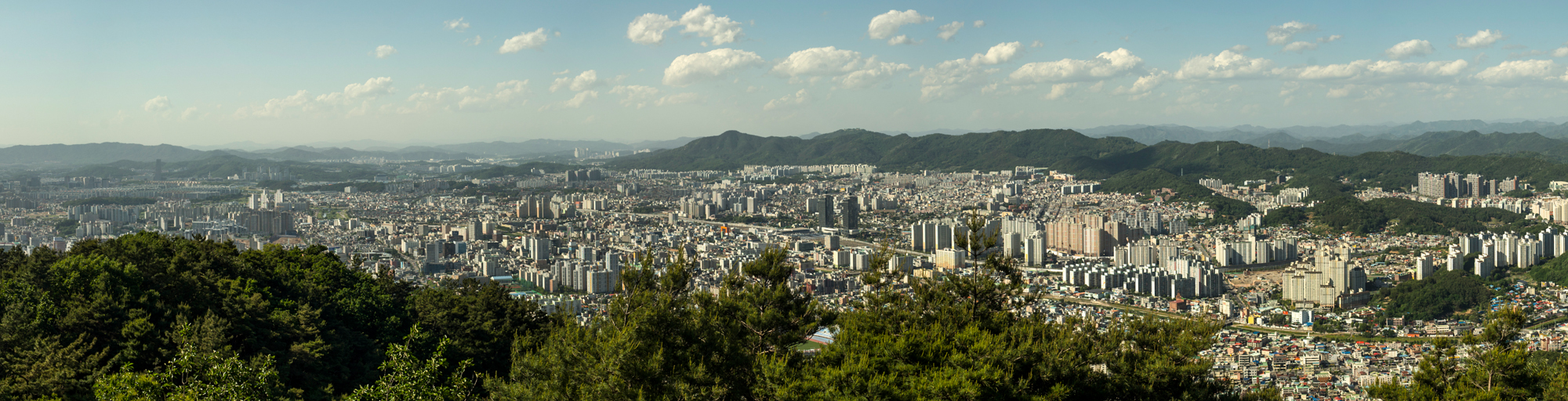
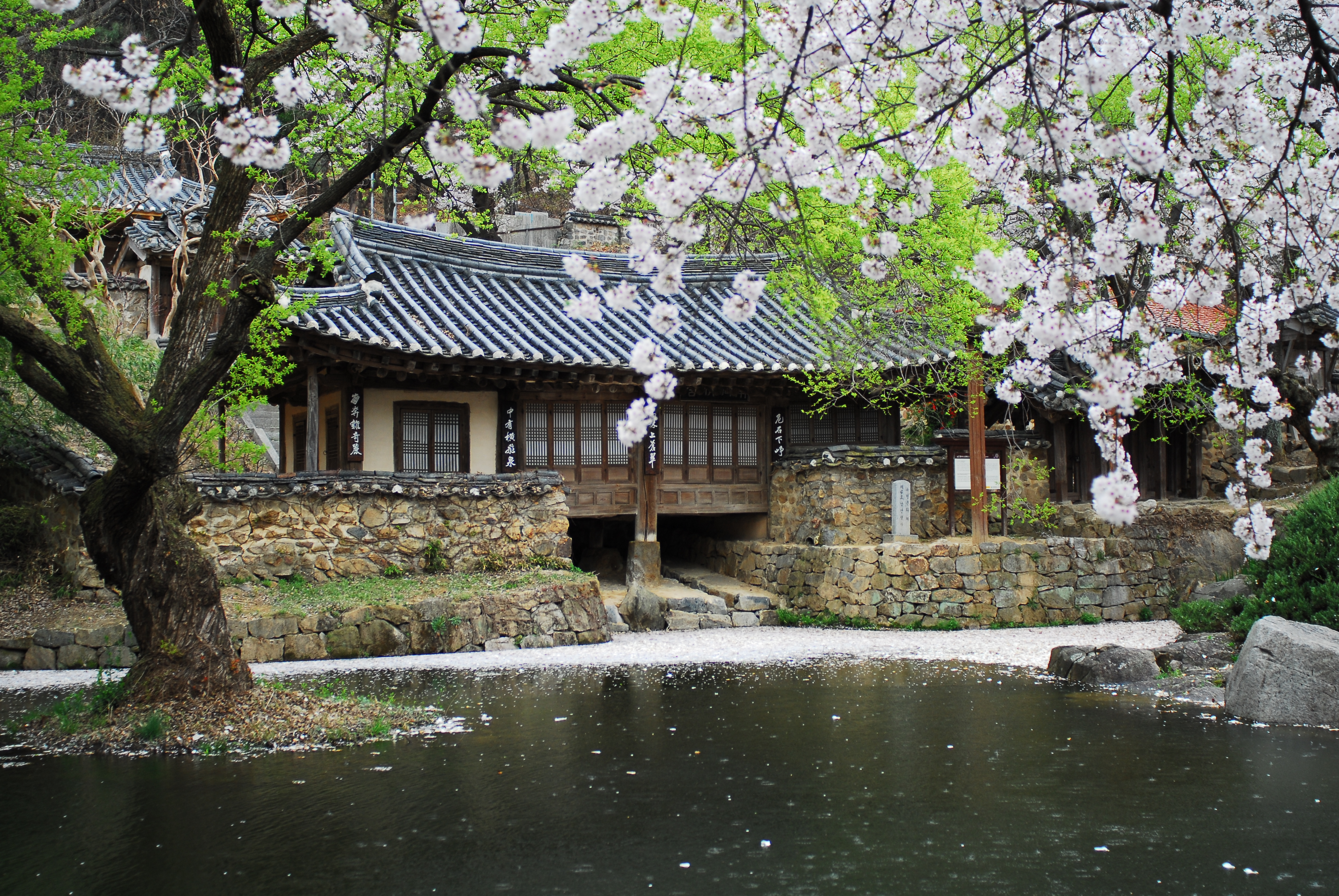
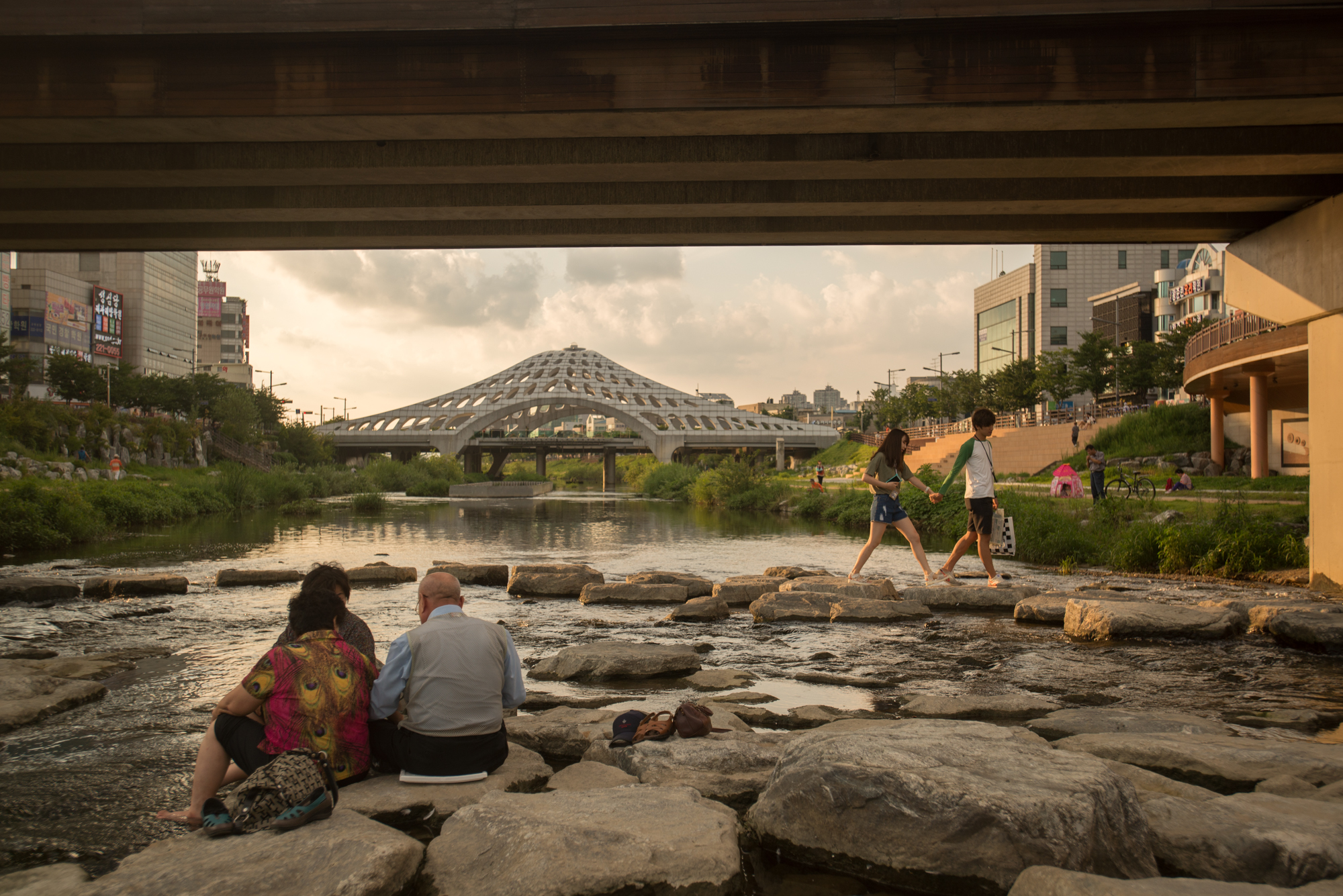
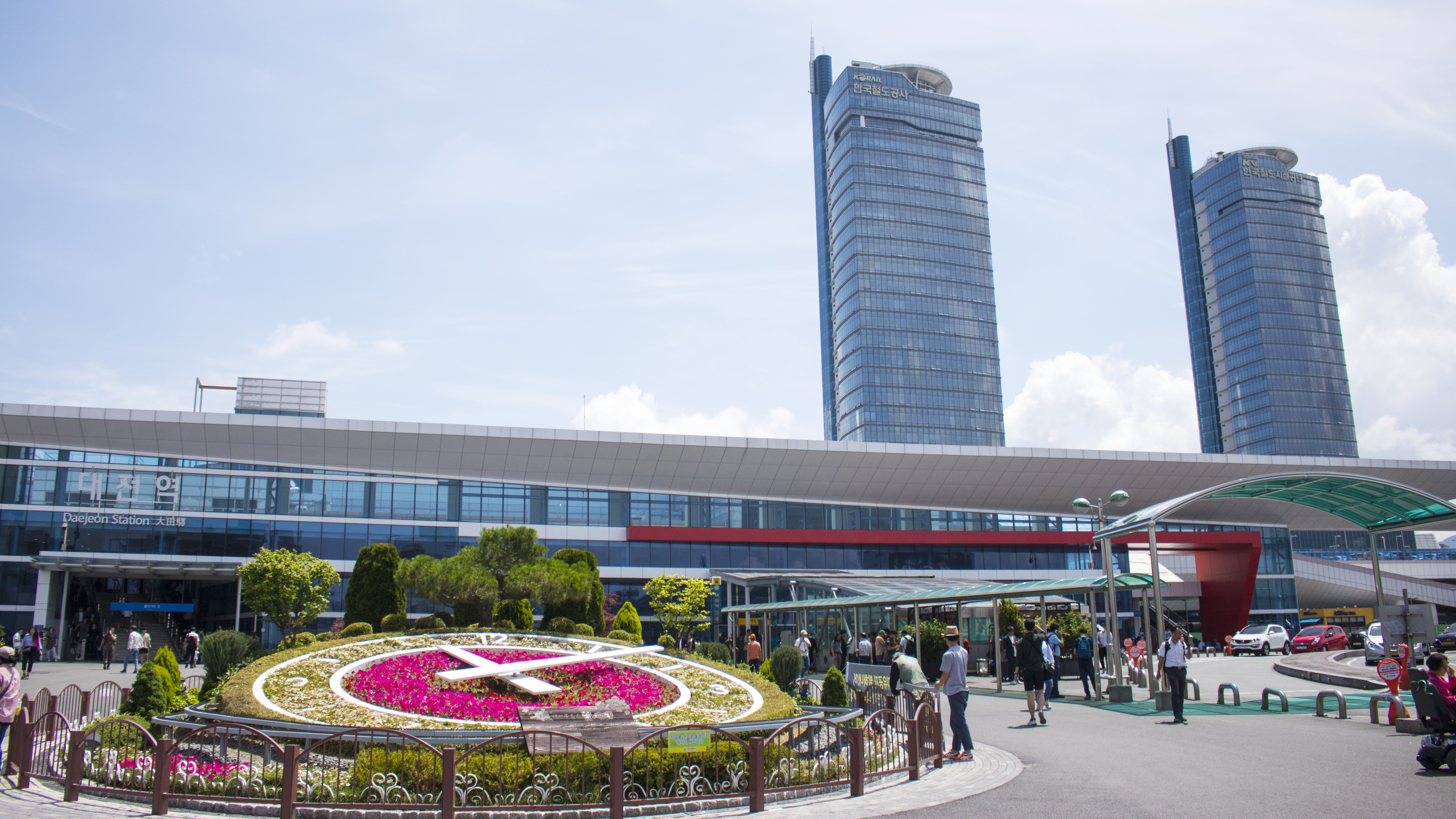
- View of Daejeon from Bomunsan Uam Historic Park Daejeoncheon Government Complex Daejeon Station

- Flag Emblem
- Interactive map of Daejeon
- Location within South Korea
- Coordinates: 36°21′00″N 127°23′06″E
- Country: South Korea
- Region: Hoseo
- Districts: 5

Government
  - Type: Mayor–council
  - Mayor: Heo Tae-jeong (Democratic)
  - Body: Daejeon Metropolitan Council

Area
  - Total: 539.85 km^{2} (208.44 sq mi)

Population (February 2026)
  - Total: 1,441,203
  - Density: 2,669.6/km^{2} (6,914.3/sq mi)
  - Dialect: Chungcheong

GDP (Nominal, 2023)
  - Total: KRW 54 trillion (US$ 43 billion)
  - Per capita: US$ 33,682
- ISO 3166 code: KR-30
- Flower: Yulan magnolia
- Tree: Korean red pine
- Bird: Oriental magpie
- Website: daejeon.go.kr

Korean name
- Hangul: 대전광역시
- Hanja: 大田廣域市
- RR: Daejeon-gwangyeoksi
- MR: Taejŏn-gwangyŏksi

Daejeon (Korean: 대전; Korean pronunciation: [tɛdʑʌn]) is South Korea's fifth-largest metropolis, with a population of nearly 1.5 million. Located in a central lowland valley between the Sobaek Mountains and the Geum River, the city is known both as a technology and research center, and for its close relationship with the natural environment. Daejeon is a major transportation hub, having developed as a railway town, and is approximately 50 minutes from Seoul by KTX or SRT high speed rail.

Daejeon (along with Seoul, Gwacheon and Sejong City) is one of South Korea's administration hubs. The city is home to 23 universities and colleges, including Korea Advanced Institute of Science and Technology (KAIST) and Chungnam National University, as well as government research institutes, and research and development centers for many chaebols such as Samsung and LG, mostly located in the city's Daedeok Innopolis.

From the 1980s, multiple national administrative functions were moved from Seoul to Daejeon, most of which are now located in the Government Complex, resulting in another population increase. It was elevated to the status of metropolitan city in 1989. The city was a sub host for the 1986 Asian Games, hosted the Expo '93, and the 2000 International Mathematical Olympiad and will be the main host city of the 2027 Summer World University Games.

Daejeon is situated in a lowland valley with three major rivers, all of them eventually flowing into the Yellow Sea by way of the Geum River. The city is surrounded by several small mountains, and is located approximately 170 km (106 mi) south of Seoul, 290 km (180 mi) north of Busan, and 70 km (43 mi) east of the Yellow Sea. It experiences a monsoon-influenced, four-season climate with wet, hot summers and drier, cold winters.

Daejeon is bordered to the east by Boeun County and Okcheon County in North Chungcheong Province, to the west by Gongju and Gyeryong in South Chungcheong Province, to the south by Geumsan County and Nonsan in South Chungcheong Province, and to the north by Sejong City and Cheongju in North Chungcheong Province. Its geographical coordinates range from 127°14′ to 127°33′ east longitude and 36°10′ to 36°29′ north latitude. Daejeon covers an area of 539.98 square kilometers and has a population of 1,518,775 as of 2015. Administratively, the city is divided into five districts and 79 administrative neighborhoods (177 legal neighborhoods). The metropolitan city hall is located in Dunsan-dong, Seo District.

== Etymology ==
The earliest record of the modern name 'Daejeon' is in the 1481 geography book, Tongguk yŏji sŭngnam. 'Daejeon' (대전 大田) is a Hanja translation of the native placeword for the area, 'Hanbat' (한밭), meaning 'Great fields'. 'Hanbat', is a compound word that adds 'Han' (한/often transcribed in Hanja as 韓, as in Korea), that means Great or big, and the word 'Bat' (밭), meaning field, leading to Big/Great Field(s).The 'Han' (한) translated into 'Dae' (大) - both meaning big, and 'Bat' (밭) translated to 'Jeon' (田), both meaning fields.

The name Hanbat is still in use as a road name for Hanbat-daero (한밭대로), or Hanbat road, a road of 12.7 kilometers connecting Daejeon's Yuseong district to Dong-gu. The name also exists in several other Daejeon landmarks and institutions, including Hanbat National University and Hanbat Baseball Stadium.

== History ==
=== Ancient history to the Later Three Kingdoms Era (Note: ~ year 936, encompassing ancient history, the Proto-Three Kingdoms Era, Three Kingdoms Era, Northern and Southern States period (also Unified Silla period), Later Three Kingdoms Era.) ===
It is unclear exactly when humans first inhabited the Daejeon area. However, the Paleolithic site of Seokjang-ri in nearby Gongju, Chungcheongnam-do, and the Yongho-dong site (Note: The Yongho-dong site dates back 100,000 years, corresponding to the Middle Paleolithic period. Stone tools, known as ganseokgi, have been excavated from this archaeological site.) in Daedeok District, Daejeon, suggest that people lived here from around that time. From the Bronze Age, artifacts such as bronze items, dwelling sites, and pottery have been excavated, providing concrete evidence of sustained human habitation.

During the Proto–Three Kingdoms Period, the area was part of Mahan, one of the Three Han states. It is believed to have been home to Sinheunguk (臣釁國), one of the small states that made up Mahan. However, some theories place Sinheunguk in Seosan or Yesan County in South Chungcheong Province, so its exact location is uncertain. Proponents of the Daejeon theory speculate that "Sinheung" is related to Jinhyeon-hyeon, (Note: Jinhyeon-hyeon evolved into Jinryeong-hyeon, which later became Jinjam-hyeon, ultimately leading to the origin of the current place name Jinjam-dong.) which will be discussed later and eventually connects to the place name Jinjam-dong. Meanwhile, the area around the now Yuseong District is thought to have been the site of Naebiri-guk (內卑離國) of Mahan. This is because the Three Kingdoms-era place name for Yuseong District, Nosaji, is also recorded as Naesaji (內斯只), and both names share the element "Nae" (內). (Note: The term Naebiri (內卑離) incorporates the suffix biri (卑離, *pɛrɛ), which appears repeatedly in the names of small states during the Samhan period. This recurring usage suggests that biri functioned as a toponymic suffix, similar to buri (夫里) found in Baekje place names and beol (伐/火, *pɔr) used in Silla place names. The Sino-Korean character ji (只) carried the phonetic value 'ge' (*kɛ) in the Baekje language, signifying "castle." Additionally, sa (斯), also recorded as jil (叱), is associated with the Middle Korean genitive particle 's.' Consequently, Naesaji (內斯只) can be analyzed as a combination of 'nae' (內) meaning "inner," the genitive particle, and 'seong' (城) meaning "castle," thus translating to "inner castle." This analysis indicates that the central element in both place names is 'nae' (內). During that period, the pronunciation was likely close to 'nu' or 'no.' Despite the similarities, some scholars have argued that biri (卑離) and ji (只) could not be used interchangeably as toponymic suffixes because their meanings differed. However, evidence from the Mahan state Byeokbiriguk, which also utilized the suffix 'biri,' supports the interchangeable usage. During the Three Kingdoms period, Byeokbiriguk was renamed Byeokgol (辟骨), meaning "castle," paralleling how 'ji' (只) was used. This parallel suggests that associating Naebirikuk and Naesaji is plausible. Furthermore, the Old Chinese pronunciation of nae (內) ended with /*s/, which implies that the phonetic value *sɛ may have been omitted in writing during the Proto-Samhan period. This omission provides additional support for linking Naebirikuk with Naesaji, as the core element 'nae' (內) remains consistent despite the phonetic changes.)

In the Three Kingdoms Period, the area became part of Baekje's territory and was known as Usul-gun (雨述郡), centered around Eumnae-dong in Daedeok District and including Hoedeok-dong. Also on Usul-gun, in the city exists the remains of Bakjae's mountain fortress Usul-fortress (우술성), which was declared a city-designated monument in 1989. This name is a transcription of the native Korean place name "Bisul" or "Bisuri," where they took the meaning "rain" from the character 雨 and the sound "sul" from 述. (Note: Fortunately, the phonetic value is straightforward, making it a word that can be easily inferred. However, it is difficult to confirm whether it was "sul" or "suri" due to the lack of established theories regarding the multi-syllabic tendencies of ancient Korean. Nevertheless, depending on the speaker's dialect, it is possible that both forms were used.) At Gyejoksan Mountain in Jang-dong, Daedeok District, there is a legend that "when the mountain cries during severe drought, rain comes," leading to the place name "beak-dal-san" or "beakdal" mountain, and "Bisuri," (비수리) meaning "rainy peak." This legend is also recorded in early Joseon-era texts like the Geographical Appendix to the Annals of King Sejong (Note: 懷德縣: 本百濟 雨述郡, 新羅改爲比豐郡, 高麗改爲懷德縣。 顯宗戊午, 屬公州任內。 明宗二年壬辰, 始置監務, 本朝因之。 太宗十三年癸巳, 例改爲縣監。 鷄足山。 【縣人以爲鎭】 四境, 東距淸州十四里, 西距公州七里, 南距珍山二十二里, 北距文義二十四里。 戶三百, 口一千二百六十六。 軍丁, 侍衛軍七、守護軍四、船軍一百四十九。 土姓四, 黃、任、李、房; 亡姓一, 郭。 貞民驛續姓二, 裵、金。 厥土肥塉相半, 墾田二千六百八十八結。 【水田五分之二】 土宜五穀, 木瓜。 土貢, 眞茸、鳥足茸、漆、雜羽、黃蠟、棗、狐皮、狸皮、山獺皮、芝草、紙。 藥材, 五倍子、土産石鐵。 【産縣北二十里稷洞, 下品。】 鷄足山石城。 【在縣東十里, 四面險阻, 周回三百七十四步二尺。 內有泉一, 冬夏不渴。 鄕人云: "天旱, 此山鳴則必雨。"】 驛一, 貞民。 【俗訛田民】 利遠津。 【俗號荊角津, 有渡船。】 烽火一處, 雞足山。 【東準沃川、環山, 北準文義、所山。】 越境處, 儒城 東村 郞山里, 越入縣南面。) and the Sinjŭng Tongguk yŏji sŭngnam (신증동국여지승람; 新增東國輿地勝覽), the version of Tongguk yŏji sŭngnam, updated in 1530.

Under Usul-gun, there were Nosaji-hyeon (奴斯只縣) (Note: It was also known as Nojilji (奴叱只). According to Hyangmuncheonui Hangugeo Bisa, the actual pronunciation is estimated to be nɔsɛkɛ 'Nosege'. This area encompasses the now Oncheon 1 and 2-dong in Yuseong District and the Dunsan New Town region in Seo-gu.) in the area of Guseong-dong, Yuseong District; Sobipo-hyeon (所比浦縣) (Note: This area encompasses the now Oncheon 1 and 2-dong and Sinseong-dong in Yuseong District, as well as the Dunsan New Town region in Seo-gu.) in Deokjin-dong; and Jinhyeon-hyeon (眞峴縣) (Note: This area includes Jinjam-dong in Yuseong District.) in Bonggok-dong, Seo-gu. Among these, Jinhyeon-hyeon was the only one not under Usul-gun but belonged to Hwangdeungyasangun (黃等也山郡), centered around Yeonsan-myeon in Nonsan, South Chungcheong Province. Based on the Five Divisions established during King Seong(성왕;year 504 ~557 july)'s reign(523 may~ 554 july), the area around Gongju was the Northern Division, and the area around Nonsan was the center of the Eastern Division, so it likely belonged to one of these two. Considering that the Daejeon area later generally moved in conjunction with Gongju, the dominant theory is that it belonged to the Northern parts of regional classification. (Note: On the other hand, since Jinhyeon-hyeon was under the separate jurisdiction of Hwangdeungyasangun, it is highly probable that only this prefecture belonged to the Eastern Division.)

During this period, the area was one of the main frontlines among Goguryeo, Baekje, and Silla, resulting in many mountain fortress ruins in Daejeon, leading to an oral tradition that the name of Sikjang Mountain originated from the Baekje army storing provisions on the mountain. There are also numerous fortifications that are closer to small forts than large mountain fortresses. Notably, after Baekje's King Gaero had Wiryeseong captured by Goguryeo's King Jangsu, Baekje faced a critical crisis due to continued southward advances by Goguryeo. The Goguryeo army reached as far as the Daejeon area, creating an unprecedented situation where Baekje's Ungjin Fortress was pressured from both the northeast (Sejong) and southeast (Daejeon). Relics left by the Goguryeo army from this time can be found in Wolpyeong-dong in Seo District, Daejeon, as well as in Bugaang-myeon, Saerom-dong, and Naseong-dong in Sejong.

It was not until the reign of King Dongseong that Baekje, allied with Silla, succeeded in driving out the Goguryeo forces from the Daejeon area. Baekje recovered the entirety of Sejong, most of Cheongju, and most of Daejeon. However, they had to tolerate Silla's occupation of the entire Goesan area—which was originally part of Hanseong Baekje's territory—as well as the northern half of now Daedeok District and the southwestern part of Cheongju. Goesan was recovered from Silla during the reign of King Uija of Baekje, but the Sintanjin area and the southwestern part of Cheongju were never regained until Baekje fell. Therefore, the northern region of Daedeok District has deep historical connections not only with Baekje but also with Silla.

During the wars for the unification of the Three Kingdoms in 660, there is a record that the Silla army stationed at Nosurisan (怒受利山) during the Battle of Hwangsanbeol, (Note: "On July 10 of this year, Su Dingfang of Tang led naval forces and set up camp at Mijajin (尾資津). King Chun-chu of Silla led his troops and stationed at Nosurisan (怒受利山). After jointly attacking Baekje for three days, they captured our royal fortress. On the 13th of the same month, they broke through the royal fortress for the first time. Nosurisan is the eastern border of Baekje." — From the Nihon Shoki, article dated September 5, the 6th year of Empress Saimei (660 AD), report by Baekje monk Gakjong.) which broke out on July 9. Given the phonetic similarity to Nosaji-hyeon located in Yuseong District, it is considered to be the same place. As the Daejeon area was a border region adjacent to Hwangdeungyasangun (Nonsan), a fierce battleground, it would have been suitable for the Silla army to set up camp.

After the fall of Baekje, the area became the backdrop for the Baekje Revival Movement. The Ongsanseong (甕山城), where the revival forces blocked the Silla army's path and fought around August 661, is presumed to be Gyejoksanseong Fortress on Gyejoksan Mountain in Jang-dong, Daedeok District. After a three-day siege, Ongsanseong fell on September 27. (Note: Although they were urged to surrender, the unnamed castle lord refused, saying he would rather die fighting. Given the severe plundering by the Tang army led by Su Dingfang after Baekje's fall, it's understandable that the resentment and hostility among the displaced Baekje people were extreme. After the fortress fell, the castle lord was executed, but the soldiers were all released.) Subsequently, Usul-gun was attacked by Kim Pumil, the governor of Sangju, and over 1,000 people were executed. According to records, Jo Bok (助服), the last military commander of Usul-gun and a second-rank Dalsol, surrendered to Silla along with a third-rank Eunsol named Paga (波伽) and their followers. (Note: Typically, a fourth-rank Deoksol was appointed as a military commander, but since a second-rank Dalsol was stationed in Usul-gun, it can be inferred that Baekje considered Usul-gun extremely important as a strategic point.) Later, in August 662, remnants of the revival forces gathered and fortified themselves at Naesajiseong (內斯只城), presumed to be the fortress located in the aforementioned Nosaji-hyeon (奴斯只縣) which corresponds to the now Yuseong District area, and resisted, prompting the dispatch of 19 generals, including Kim Heumsun, to defeat them.

In the Unified Silla period, based on Silla's nine provinces and five secondary capitals policy, the area belonged to Ungcheonju (熊川州). Later, due to King Gyeongdeok's Sinicization policy in 757, Usul-gun was renamed Bipung-gun (比豊郡), (Note: This is a different way of transcribing the previously mentioned "Bisul/Bisuri" compared to Baekje's Usul (雨述). Whereas Usul used the meaning "rain" (雨) for "bi" and the sound "sul" (述) for "sul/suri", Bipung (比豊) likely used the sound "bi" (比) for "bi" and the meaning "sul/suri" (豊) for "sul/suri", resulting in Bipung (比豊).) Nosaji-hyeon became Yuseong-hyeon (儒城縣), (Note: As is well known, this is the origin of today's Yuseong District. It is one of the oldest place names in the now Daejeon area. The next oldest is Hoedeok, established during the Goryeo Dynasty. For reference, the estimated reconstructed pronunciation of the aforementioned Nosaji (奴斯只) is nɔsɛkɛ, which can be analyzed as nɔ-sɛ-kɛ. Here, kɛ means "castle" in the Baekje language, corresponding to the "seong" (城) in Yuseong. Additionally, the character 儒 (yu) had an Old Chinese pronunciation close to 'no', corresponding to the 'no' (奴) in Nosaji. Therefore, the place name Yuseong (儒城) was created by appropriately transcribing and translating the original native name Nosaji (奴斯只).) (Note: Alternatively, nɔsɛ can be considered a single word. Linguist Yoon Hee-soo reconstructed the ancient Korean word nɔsɛ meaning "generosity" or "compassion," based on the fact that Nosahwa-hyeon (奴斯火縣), a place name from the Three Kingdoms period, was renamed Jain-hyeon (慈仁縣) during King Gyeongdeok's reign. If the Nosa (奴斯) in Nosaji-hyeon has the same meaning, then the character 儒 (yu) in Yuseong-hyeon (儒城), which also conveys the meaning of "benevolence," was chosen considering both the pronunciation and the meaning of the original native place name. 혹은 '*nɔsɛ' 자체를 한 단어로 보기도 한다. 언어학자 윤희수는 삼국시대 지명인 노사화현(奴斯火縣)이 경덕왕 대에 자인현(慈仁縣)으로 개칭된 사실을 통해 고대 한국어로 너그러움, 자비로움을 뜻했던 단어 *nɔsɛ '노세'를 재구했는데, 노사지현의 노사(奴斯)가 같은 뜻이라면 너그럽다는 의미도 있는 유성현의 유(儒) 자는 기존 고유어 지명의 발음뿐만 아니라 뜻도 고려한 글자에 해당한다고 보았다.) Sobipo-hyeon became Jeokjo-hyeon (赤鳥縣), and Jinhyeon-hyeon was renamed Jinryeong-hyeon (鎭嶺縣). Jinryeong-hyeon still belonged separately to Hwangsan-gun (黃山郡), the renamed Hwangdeungyasangun. Ungcheonju was also renamed Ungju (熊州).

During the Later Three Kingdoms period in the early 900s, the area came under the territory of Later Baekje. Compared to the original Baekje, Later Baekje's domain extended much further east beyond Daejeon, deeply into Gyeongsang-do, and had also reclaimed the northern part of Daedeok District, which had previously been occupied by Silla. Therefore, the area of Daejeon belonged to Later Baekje until its collapse in 936.

=== Goryeo Dynasty ===
Entering the Goryeo period, Bipung-gun (比豊郡) was renamed Hoedeok-hyeon (懷德縣), Jeokjo-hyeon (赤鳥縣) became Deokjin-hyeon (德津縣), and Jinryeong-hyeon (鎭嶺縣) was changed to Jinjam-hyeon (鎭岑縣), while Yuseong-hyeon remained unchanged. According to the ten provinces established during King Seongjong's reign, the Daejeon area belonged to Hanam-do. All four prefectures were subordinate to Gongju-mok (公州牧), which had been elevated to one of the twelve administrative districts known as "mok."

Later, during King Hyeonjong's reign, the implementation of the Five Provinces and Two Frontier Regions system placed the four prefectures under Yanggwang-do. Gongju-mok was downgraded back to simply Gongju, but the four prefectures remained its subordinate counties.

Subsequently, during King Myeongjong's reign, Hoedeok-hyeon and Jinjam-hyeon were promoted to "ju-hyeon" (main counties), and officials known as "Gamwu" (監務) (Note: Later renamed to Hyeongam (縣監), this official was lower in rank than the Hyeongryeong (縣令), who was also dispatched to a county/prefecture (hyeon).) were dispatched, initiating independent administration. This autonomy continued into the Joseon Dynasty, where they remained separate districts. However, Yuseong-hyeon and Deokjin-hyeon did not gain independence and continued as subordinate counties of Gongju.

Meanwhile, there were special administrative districts called "hyang," "bugok," and "so." Among these, the most famous was Myeonghakso (鳴鶴所), known as the site of the Mang Yi and Mang Soi Rebellion. This area is believed to have been located in what is now Tanbang-dong in Seo-gu.

=== Joseon Dynasty ===
During the Joseon period, Hoedeok-hyeon and Jinjam-hyeon were each elevated to Hoedeok-gun and Jinjam-gun, respectively. The area that is now the central part of Daejeon remained a small rural village within Gongju, which had been re-elevated to Gongju-mok during the reign of King Chung-hye of Goryeo. Notable figures like Song Si-yeol of the Eunjin Song clan lived in this vicinity, and the place name Songchon-dong, related to them, still exists as one of Daejeon's districts. Additionally, the Hoedeok Hwang clan established their base in the Hoedeok-hyeon area. Meanwhile, the name "Daejeon" (大田), which is the Hanja transcription of the native term "Hanbat" (한밭) for Great Fields, first appeared in records in the early Joseon period, in Tongguk yŏji sŭngnam, and continues to be used today.

Until 1906, the current central area of Daejeon was part of Gongju, not Hoedeok or Jinjam, before it was incorporated into Hoedeok-gun. Of course, that elongated territory of Gongju wasn't Gongju land in the narrow sense; rather, as the concept of subordinate prefectures (sokhyeon) like Yuseong-hyeon and Deokjin-hyeon disappeared and were absorbed into Gongju itself, the territory expanded accordingly.

However, the now Yuseong area remained part of Gongju until it was transferred during the establishment of Daejeon-gun in 1914. With Yuseong joining Daejeon-gun, the region roughly restored the combined territory of the central area and its subordinate prefectures from the times of Usul-gun and Bipung-gun.

What transformed the history of Daejeon was the finalization of the Gyeongbu Line railway route in 1900. After Daejeon Station was established in Daejeon-ri, Sannae-myeon, Gongju County, in 1904, population influx began and urbanization took off. In 1906, when Sannae-myeon was incorporated into Hoedeok County, the Hoedeok County Office also moved from its original location in Hoedeok town to the urban area of Daejeon.

=== Japanese Occupation ===
In 1914, during the major reorganization of administrative districts by the Japanese Governor-General of Korea, the existing Hoedeok County and Jinjam County, along with Yuseong-myeon (Yuseong Township) of Gongju County, were merged to form Daejeon County (大田郡). Had the name Hoedeok County been retained, the city might be called "Hoedeok Metropolitan City" today. Instead, the name "Daejeon," which was simply the name of the village where the train station was located, was adopted as the new county name, replacing the traditional name Hoedeok.

=== Modern day ===
In 1963, Daejeon expanded its territory by incorporating the entire Yucheon-myeon of Daedeok-gun, and parts of Sannae and Hoedeok-myeon. From this point, Sannae-myeon of Daedeok-gun became an actual exclave.

In 1973, Buk-myeon and Yuseong-myeon of Daedeok-gun were each elevated to Sintanjin-eup and Yuseong-eup, respectively. In 1977, the ward system (gu-je) was implemented in Daejeon, establishing two wards: Jung-gu and Dong-gu. In 1983, Daejeon further expanded by incorporating the entire areas of Yuseong-eup and Hoedeok-myeon of Daedeok-gun, and parts of Tan-dong, Gujeok, Jinjam, and Giseong-myeon. At this time, Daedeok-gun was split into two separate parts. This situation continued until 1989, when Daedeok-gun was abolished and Daejeon was elevated to a Directly Governed City. Just before this elevation in 1988, Seo-gu was separated from Jung-gu. In 1989, Daedeok-gun was abolished and merged into Daejeon, and the integrated Daejeon of Chungcheongnam-do was elevated to Daejeon Directly Governed City. Simultaneously, Yuseong District was separated from Seo-gu, and Daedeok District from Dong-gu, completing the current system of five districts.

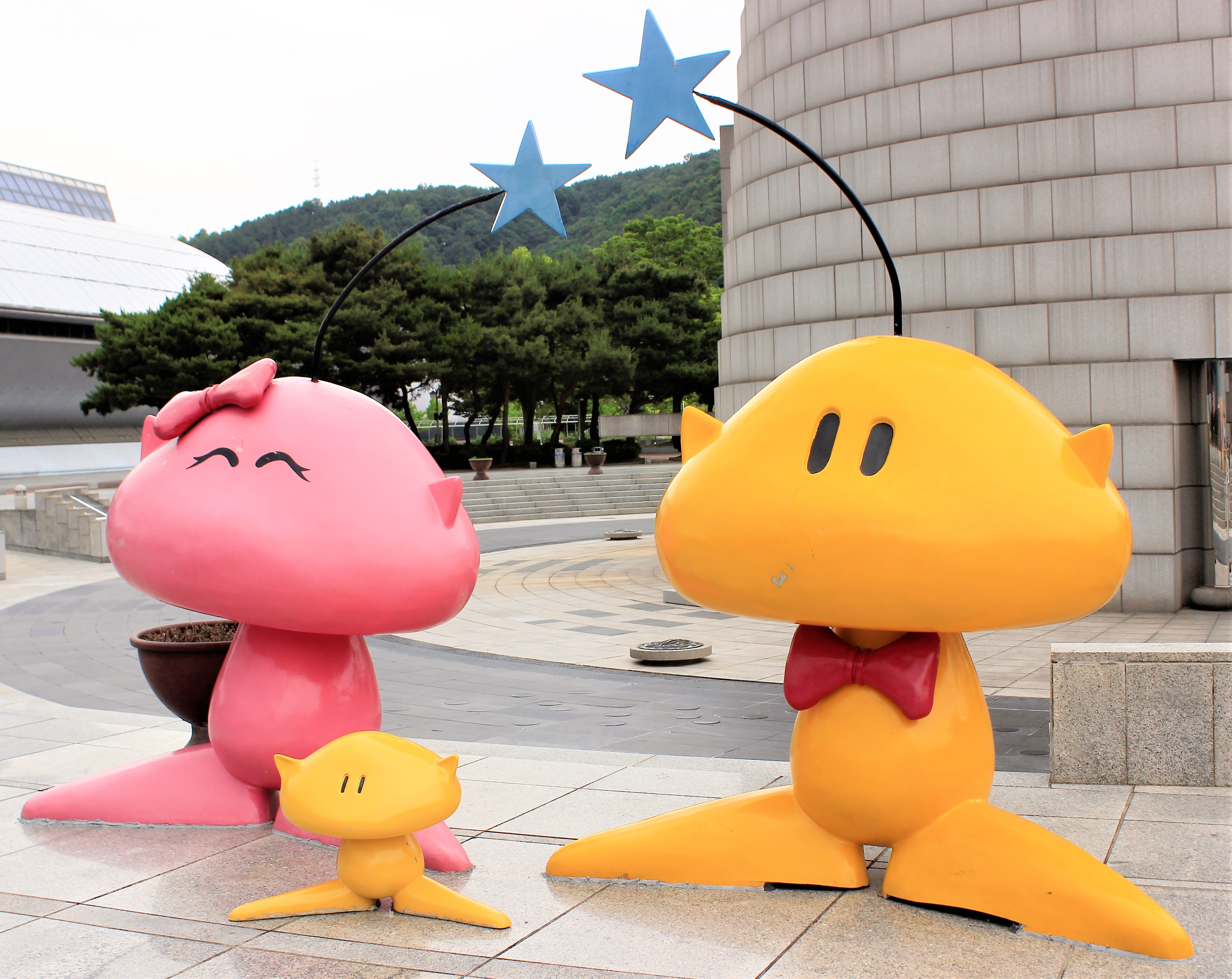
Kumdori;꿈돌이, or the little alien, mascot of the local 1993 expo.

In 1993, the city hosted the 1993 Daejeon Expo, which increased its national profile. The yellow alien mascot "Kumdori" appeared in various products such as plush toys and animations, becoming one of Daejeon's mascots. After the Expo ended, the facilities and site were utilized to open the Expo Science Park, but some exhibition halls are now almost closed. Although it had the smallest population among the five Directly Governed Cities, it surpassed Gwangju Metropolitan City in population in 1995. In the same year, it was renamed to the current Daejeon Metropolitan City.

In the late 1980s, Daejeon was elevated to the status of Special City (Jikhalsi), thus became a separate administrative region from South Chungcheong Province. In 1995, all South Korean Special Cities were again renamed as Metropolitan Cities, which is reflected in the current official name of Daejeon, Daejeon Metropolitan City (대전광역시).

In the 1980s, the Korean administration began moving various national government operations from Seoul to Daejeon, eventually opening the Daejeon Government Complex in 1997. Today, the national government offices in Daejeon include Korea Customs Service, Small and Medium Business Administration, Public Procurement Service, National Statistical Office, Military Manpower Administration, Korea Forest Service, Cultural Heritage Administration, Korean Intellectual Property Office, Korail, Korea Water Resources Corporation, Korea Minting and Security Printing Corporation and Patent Court of Korea.

The population of Daejeon increased dramatically as a result of the government center. With the construction of Sejong Special Self-Governing City in 2013 for the division of capital functions and balanced local development, many of the public institutions that had previously headed to Daejeon were moved to Sejong, and many public institutions in Seoul were also moved to Sejong. With the launch of Sejong City, large-scale development began, resulting in infrastructure construction and large-scale apartment complexes. Sejong is located immediately north of Daejeon, and Daejeon citizens began to outflow to Sejong. As of July 2020, there was net outflow of more than 100,000 people from Daejeon to Sejong.

== Geography ==
Daejeon lies between latitudes N36°10'59" and N36°30'1" and longitudes E127°14'48" and E127°33'35" near the middle of South Korea. It is 167.3 km (104.0 mi) from Seoul, 294 km (183 mi) from Busan and 169 km (105 mi) from Gwangju.

Known historically as 'big field,' the city lies inside a great circle surrounded by several mountains, with Gyeryongsan National Park straddling the city border on the west, and the foot of the Sobaek Mountain range just beyond the city to the south and east. Three rivers run through the center of the city: Gapcheon (갑천), Yudeungcheon (유등천), and Daejeoncheon (대전천). These flow roughly from south to north, eventually joining the Geum River which borders the city on the northeast. The river changes direction after leaving Daejeon, turning to the southwest and eventually emptying into the Yellow Sea near Gunsan.

=== Climate ===
Daejeon

Climate chart (precipitation, max. and min. temperature)
J	F	M	A	M	J	J	A	S	O	N	D
26 4 −6	37 7 −4	52 13 1	82 19 7	92 25 13	167 28 18	307 30 22	300 30 23	153 26 17	59 21 9	48 14 3	30 6 −3
- █ Average max. and min. temperatures in °C
- █ Precipitation totals in mm
Imperial conversion
J	F	M	A	M	J	J	A	S	O	N	D
1 39 22	1.5 45 26	2 55 34	3.2 67 44	3.6 76 55	6.6 82 65	12 85 72	12 87 73	6 79 63	2.3 69 49	1.9 56 37	1.2 43 26
- █ Average max. and min. temperatures in °F
- █ Precipitation totals in inches

Daejeon has a monsoon-influenced, four-season climate that lies between the humid subtropical and humid continental climatic classifications (Köppen Cwa/Dwa, respectively), with slightly more mild temperature extremes compared to Seoul. Winters are cold and dry with monthly mean temperature of −1.0 °C (30.2 °F) in January. Summers are hot and humid with a monthly mean temperature of 25.6 °C (78.1 °F) in August. The heaviest rainfall during the year typically occurs from July through August during the Korean monsoon season.

Climate data for Daejeon (1991–2020 normals, extremes 1969–present)
Month	Jan	Feb	Mar	Apr	May	Jun	Jul	Aug	Sep	Oct	Nov	Dec	Year
Record high °C (°F)	16.6 (61.9)	22.6 (72.7)	29.3 (84.7)	30.4 (86.7)	33.3 (91.9)	35.7 (96.3)	37.7 (99.9)	39.4 (102.9)	36.0 (96.8)	31.5 (88.7)	26.3 (79.3)	19.8 (67.6)	39.4 (102.9)
Mean daily maximum °C (°F)	4.1 (39.4)	7.0 (44.6)	12.7 (54.9)	19.4 (66.9)	24.5 (76.1)	27.9 (82.2)	29.6 (85.3)	30.3 (86.5)	26.3 (79.3)	20.8 (69.4)	13.5 (56.3)	6.2 (43.2)	18.5 (65.3)
Daily mean °C (°F)	−1.0 (30.2)	1.4 (34.5)	6.6 (43.9)	13.0 (55.4)	18.5 (65.3)	22.7 (72.9)	25.5 (77.9)	26.0 (78.8)	21.2 (70.2)	14.6 (58.3)	7.7 (45.9)	1.0 (33.8)	13.1 (55.6)
Mean daily minimum °C (°F)	−5.5 (22.1)	−3.6 (25.5)	1.1 (34.0)	6.9 (44.4)	12.8 (55.0)	18.1 (64.6)	22.2 (72.0)	22.5 (72.5)	17.0 (62.6)	9.4 (48.9)	2.8 (37.0)	−3.4 (25.9)	8.4 (47.1)
Record low °C (°F)	−18.6 (−1.5)	−19.0 (−2.2)	−10.7 (12.7)	−2.9 (26.8)	3.1 (37.6)	8.1 (46.6)	13.0 (55.4)	12.3 (54.1)	4.2 (39.6)	−2.9 (26.8)	−11.4 (11.5)	−17.7 (0.1)	−19.0 (−2.2)
Average precipitation mm (inches)	25.5 (1.00)	37.2 (1.46)	51.6 (2.03)	81.6 (3.21)	91.8 (3.61)	167.3 (6.59)	306.9 (12.08)	299.8 (11.80)	152.5 (6.00)	59.3 (2.33)	48.0 (1.89)	29.7 (1.17)	1,351.2 (53.20)
Average precipitation days (≥ 0.1 mm)	8.0	7.0	8.3	8.3	8.2	9.9	16.4	14.8	9.1	6.1	8.5	9.3	113.9
Average snowy days	9.8	6.0	2.8	0.2	0.0	0.0	0.0	0.0	0.0	0.1	2.1	7.9	28.9
Average relative humidity (%)	65.3	60.3	57.9	56.9	62.4	69.8	79.1	78.2	75.3	71.8	69.3	67.9	67.9
Mean monthly sunshine hours	168.2	176.2	207.7	220.5	239.8	198.5	155.5	177.0	180.3	205.1	162.4	162.5	2,253.7
Percentage possible sunshine	52.7	56.1	54.0	54.0	51.2	41.3	31.4	37.6	45.1	56.1	52.5	53.9	48.0
Average ultraviolet index	2	2	3	4	5	6	6	5	5	3	2	2	4
Source 1: Korea Meteorological Administration (percent sunshine 1981–2010)
Source 2: Weather Atlas (UV)

== Administrative divisions ==
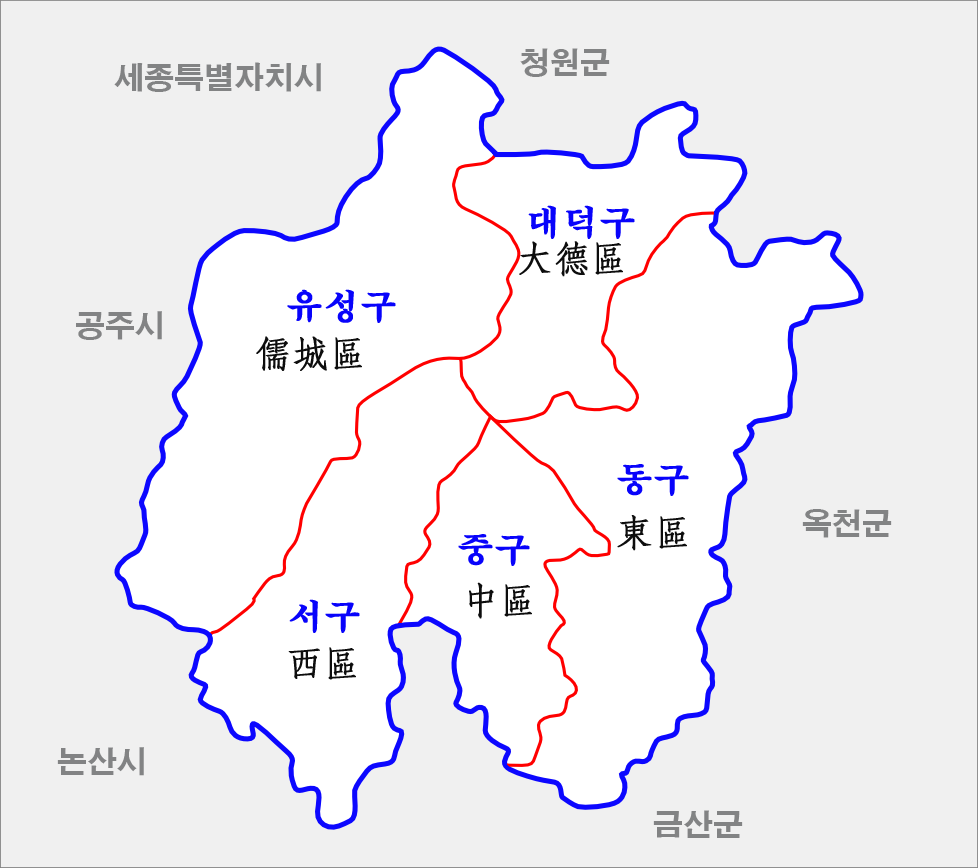
Administrative divisions of Daejeon

Daejeon is divided into five political "gu" or "districts": Seogu (서구), Donggu (동구), Yuseonggu (유성구), Daedeokgu (대덕구), and Junggu (중구).

Subdivision	Korean	Area (km^{2})	Population (September 2021)
Daedeok District	대덕구; 大德區	68.71	174,791
Dong District	동구; 東區	163.68	223,409
Jung District	중구; 中區	62.18	232,077
Seo District	서구; 西區	95.53	474,444
Yuseong District	유성구; 儒城區	176.53	350,337

== Demographics ==
Historical population
Year	Pop.	±%
1970	406,910	—
1980	651,792	+60.2%
1990	1,049,578	+61.0%
2000	1,368,207	+30.4%
2010	1,501,859	+9.8%
2020	1,488,435	−0.9%

Daejeon is the fifth most populous city in Korea, with 1,467,468 registered residents as of 2023. The most populous district is Seo District (473,851 residents), although the district lost 32,219 residents since 2006, it remains the most densely populated in the city at 4,960 inhabitants per square kilometer (4,960/km2).

As of 2023, the number of registered foreign residents in Daejeon was 21,949 (1.5% of the total population) with the largest representations being Vietnamese (0.5%), and Chinese or Korean-Chinese (0.2%). There are also smaller numbers of registered residents (0.1% or less in each case) from Uzbekistan, Mongolia, United States, Philippines, Indonesia, India, Japan, Thailand, Bangladesh, Nepal, Taiwan, Pakistan, Russia, France, United Kingdom, Canada, Germany, and Turkey.

Plot of population numbers

=== Religion ===
Religion in Daejeon (2024)
1. Not religious (51.0%)
2. Protestantism (21.0%)
3. Buddhism (17.0%)
4. Catholicism (10.0%)
5. Others (2.00%)

According to the census of 2005, of the people of Daejeon, 21.8% follow Buddhism and 31.2% follow Christianity (20.5% Protestantism and 10.7% Catholicism). There is a large mosque, namely the Islamic Center of Daejeon (ICD/ Daejeon Mosque), occupying a converted residential building within the KAIST-CNU university triangle and is extremely popular.

== Education ==
During the Joseon Dynasty, education institutions in Daejeon included Hoedeok Hyanggyo in Eumnae-dong, Daedeok District, and Jinjam Hyanggyo in Gyochon-dong, Yuseong District. Additionally, there were institutions such as Sungheon Seowon (崇賢書院), Dosan Seowon, and Jeongjeol Seowon (靖節書院). Sungheon Seowon was rebuilt in 1609 (the first year of King Gwanghaegun) by Song Nam-su (宋柟壽) after being destroyed during the Imjin War, and its ruins remain in Wonchon-dong.

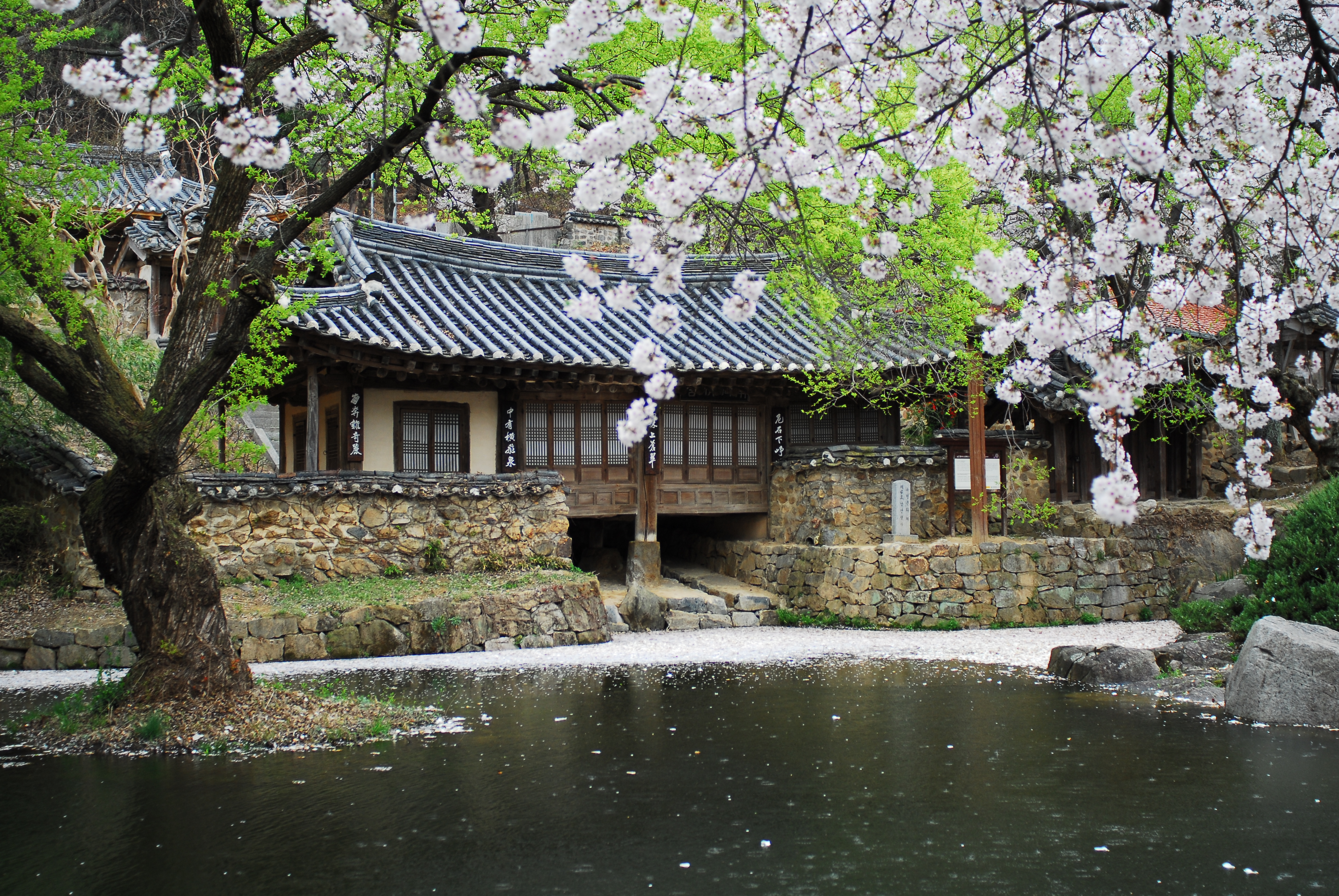
The Namganjeongsa study hall at Uam Historic Park in Daejeon

Jeongjeol Seowon was established in Geyang-dong in 1684 (the 10th year of King Sukjong), and Dosan Seowon was founded in Tanbang-dong in 1711, contributing to the education of local yangsengs (young scholars). However, it was abolished by the Seowon Abolition Order issued by Heungseon Daewongun during King Gojong's reign. In addition, much education was conducted through privately established seodangs (서당/private schools) and ganghakdang (강학당/private academies).

In 1585 (the 18th year of King Seonjo), Nambunbong (南奮鵬)'s Bongsojae (鳳巢齋) was established in Seokgyo-dong. During King Injo's reign, Kim Gyeong-yeo (金慶餘) established Song-aedang in Hoedeok 2-dong. During King Sukjong's reign, Song Si-yeol established Namganjeongsa (남간정사), and in the late Joseon period, Song Byeong-seon established Seoknamjae (石南齋) in Seongnam-dong.

As of the current period, there are 146 elementary schools, 88 middle schools, 62 high schools, 5 special schools, and 5 technical colleges,11 universities.

Regarding libraries, Daejeon is home to the Daejeon Lifelong Learning Center, Student Education and Culture Center, Hanbat Library, Yongun Library, Galma Library, Seongnam Library, Yuseong Library, Ansan Library in Daedeok District, Braille Library, Gasuwon Library, Donggu Gaowol Library, and Panam Library.

Major public universities in Daejeon include:

- Chungnam National University, a flagship national university established for the South Chungcheong Province. Chungnam National University specializes in biotechnology, medicine, and the agricultural sciences.
- Daejeon Chungnam University, a campus in the four-year Korea National Open University system.
- Hanbat National University, a university that specializes in partnerships between industry and academia.
- Korea Advanced Institute of Science and Technology (KAIST), the nation's first public research-oriented science and engineering institution. The university was ranked as the best Asian science and technology school by Asiaweek in 2000. KAIST has been internationally accredited in business education.

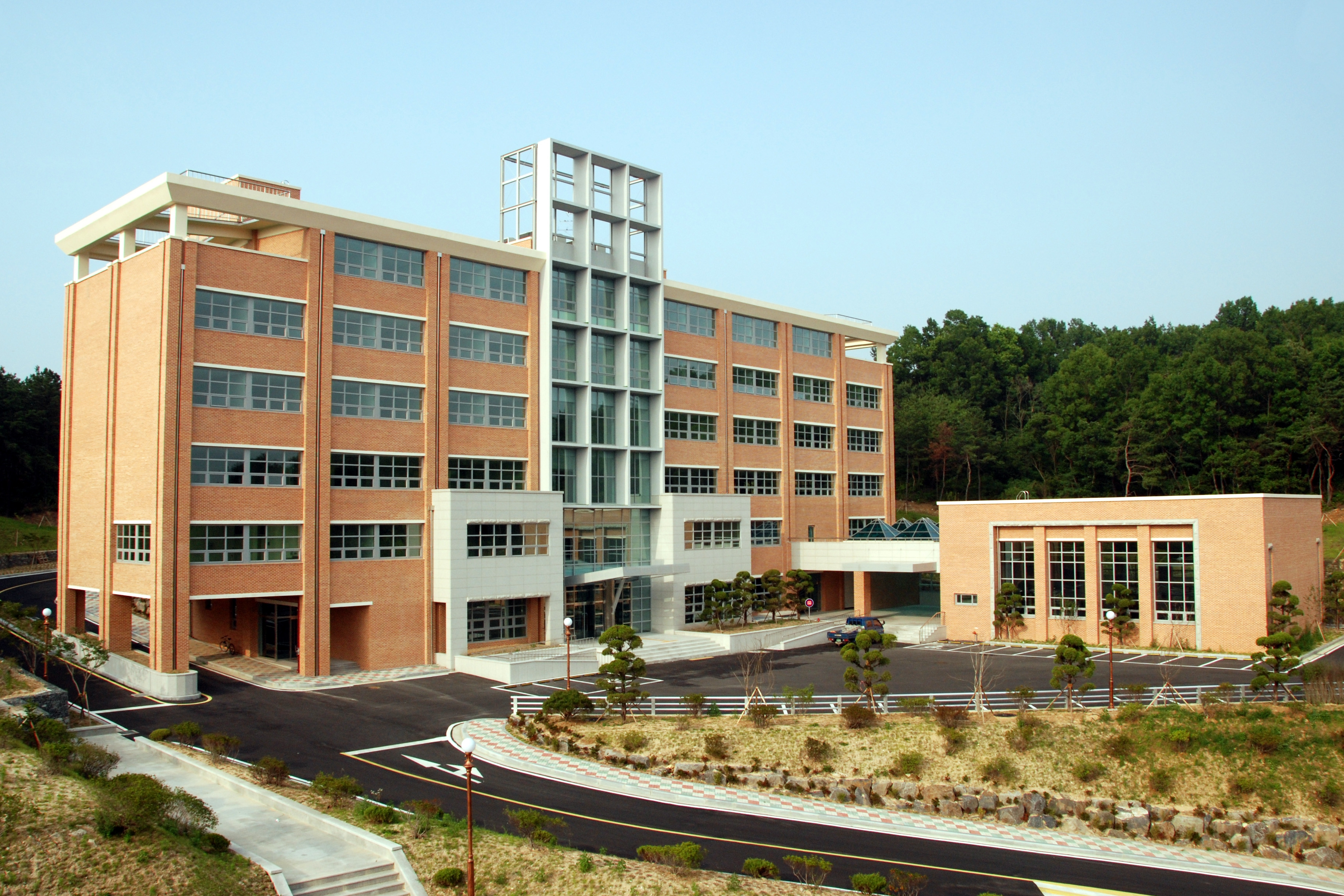
Chungnam University Law School Building

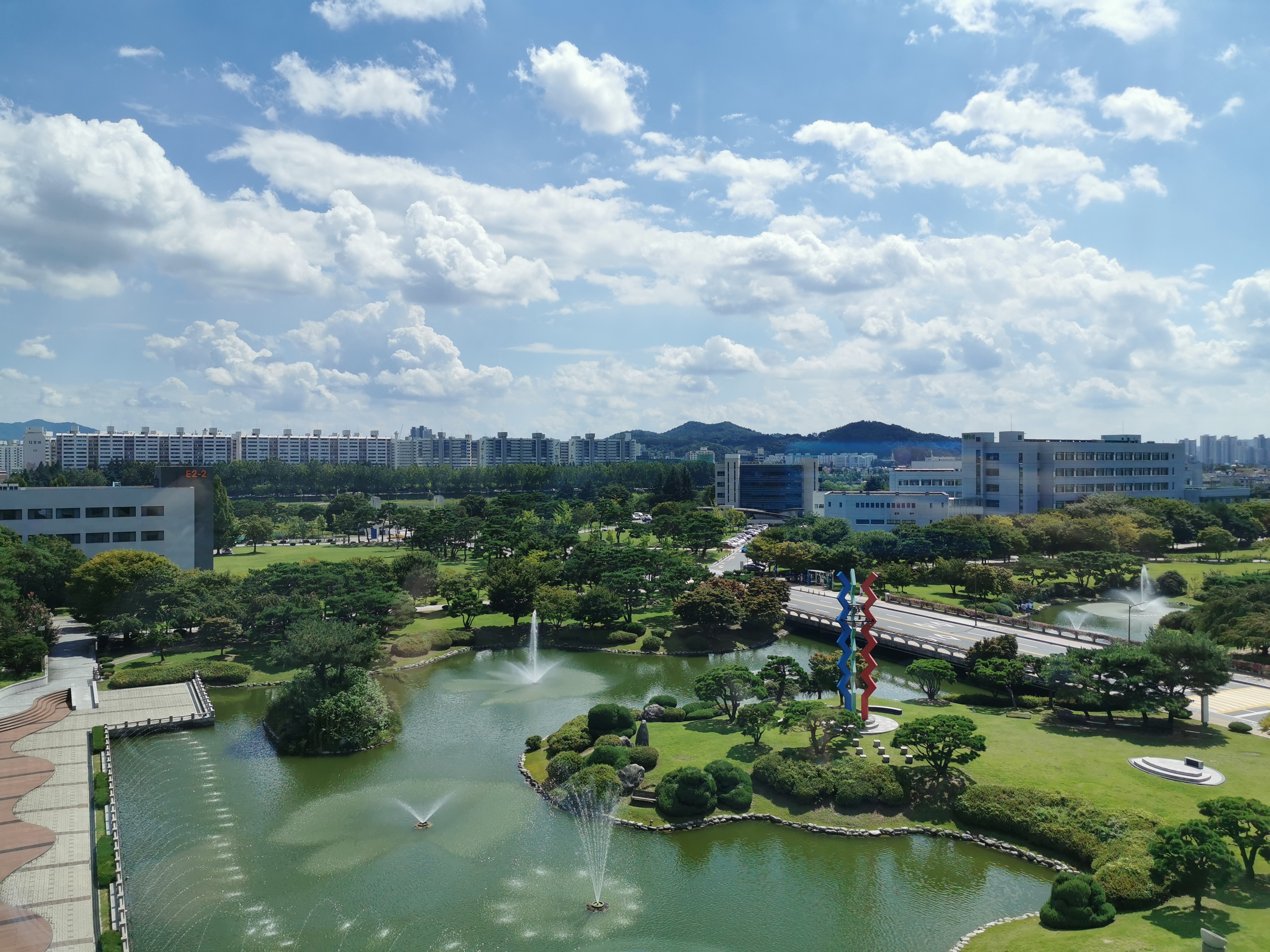
KAIST Campus

Major private universities in Daejeon include:

- Mokwon University, a Korean Methodist institution.
- Pai Chai University, founded in 1885, one of the oldest private universities in South Korea.
- Woosong University, with a specialized curriculum based on international exchange, foreign-language, and IT education.
- Hannam University, founded in 1956 by Christian missionaries, with a main campus in O-Jeong Dong (site of the historic Missionary Village), and a branch campus is in Techno Valley.

Specialized high schools and academies include:

- Daejeon Foreign Language High School is a high school focused on foreign language teaching. The school provides language education of 7 majors including English, German, French, Spanish, Chinese, Japanese, and Russian.
- Daejeon Science High School is a high school focused on teaching science.
- Taejon Christian International School is a non-profit international school.

Other Private schools include:

- Bomoon High School

== Research and development ==
Daejeon is known as the research and development hub of Korea. In addition to KAIST and the Institute for Basic Science, it is home to more than 20 other government research institutions, and various corporate research centers, mostly located around Daedeok Innopolis in Yuseong District north of the Gapcheon river.

Fields of research undertaken in Daejeon include telecommunications, nanofabrication, biotechnology, water, nuclear and hydro power, nuclear fusion, design, measurement technologies, mechanical engineering, fuel cells, aeronautics, new materials, robotics, new drugs, and environmental technologies. Daedeok Innopolis' membership includes 898 corporations, 35 government-invested and sponsored institutions; six universities, and 15 public organizations.

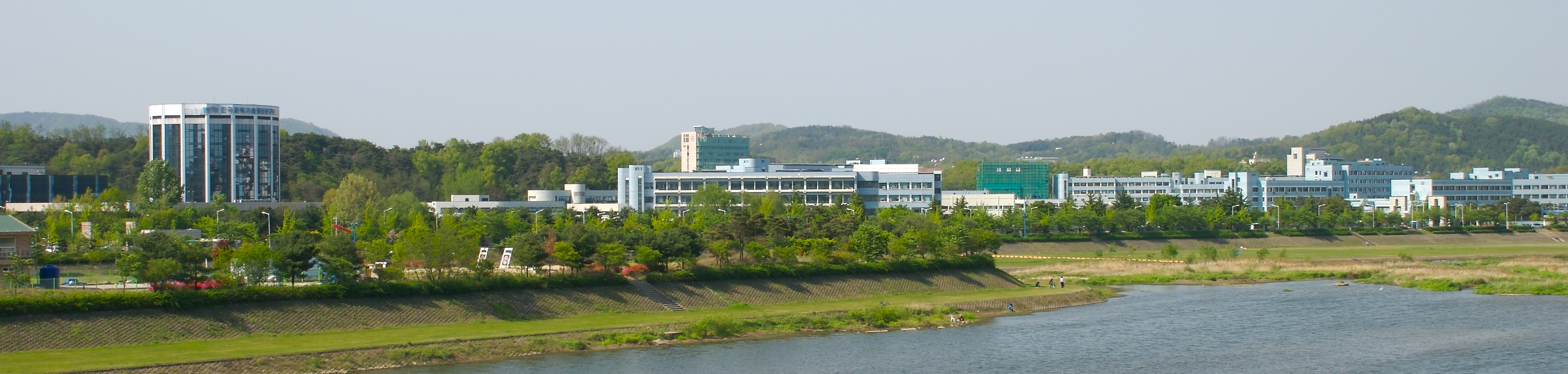
KAIST Campus

Research institutes in Daedeok include the Korea Research Institute of Bioscience and Biotechnology (KRIBB), the Korea Atomic Energy Research Institute (KAERI), Electronic and Telecommunications Research Institute (ETRI), Korea Aerospace Research Institute (KARI), Korea Astronomy and Space Science Institute (KASI), Korea Fusion Energy Research Institute (KFERI), National Nanofab Center, Korea Basic Science Institute (KBSI), Institute for Basic Science (IBS), Korea Institute of Machinery and Materials (KIMM), Korea Research Institute of Chemical Technology (KRICT), Korea Institute of Science and Technology Information (KISTI), Korea Research Institute of Standards and Science (KRISS), Marine and Ocean Engineering Research Institute, Institute of Information Technology Advancement (IITA), Korea Institute of Geosciences and Mineral Resources, Agency for Defense Development (ADD), Korea Institute of Toxicology (KIT), Korea Institute of Oriental Medicine, Korea Institute of Nuclear Non-proliferation and Control, National Institute for Mathematical Sciences (NIMS), Korea Institute of Nuclear Safety (KINS), Rare Isotope Science Project (RISP), National Research Foundation of Korea (NRF), and the National Security Research Institute. Among the technology produced in Daedeok are ETRI's wireless communications systems CDMA, WIBRO, and DMB, KRIBB's nano biochips, KARI's KOMPSAT satellites, and NFRI's KSTAR nuclear fusion experimental reactor.

Daedeok is also home to 21 corporate research centers with global reach surrounded by an equal number of smaller firms. Some of the notable corporate research centers are Dongbu Advanced Research Institute (biotechnology, microorganisms and agrichemicals), GS-Caltex Value Creation Center (environmentally friendly products including substitutes for oil), Hanwha Chemical Research (biotechnology, electronics materials, catalysts, and nanotechnology), Honam Petrochemical Daeduk Research Institute (synthetic chemistry and petrochemicals), LG Chemical LTD. Research Park (lithium ion battery and polymer battery development), Samyang R&D Center (medical research and electronics), and SK Institute of Technology (petroleum-related research).

Public corporation research institutes such as Korea Electric Power Research Institute (hydroelectric projects and nuclear energy), Korea Institute of Construction Materials (authorized test agency for construction materials), and Korea Institute of Aerospace Technology (aerospace design, satellites, launch technologies) are also part of the Daedeok system.

On 16 May 2013, Daejeon was selected as the core of the International Science and Business Belt.

Besides a tire production facility, Hankook has its main research & development centre in Daejeon.

== Culture ==
=== Museums and arts centers ===
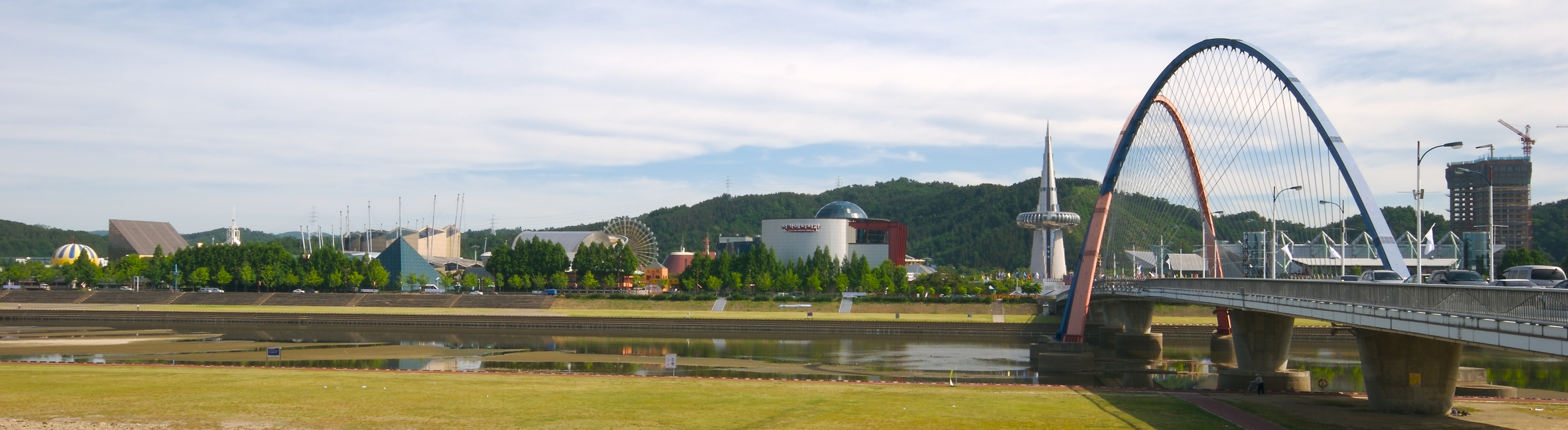
Expo Science Park in 2007

Daejeon Culture and Arts Center

Daejeon is the home of multiple arts and culture complexes, mostly centered around the Daedeok area. These include:

- Daejeon Museum of Art which hosts primarily technology-oriented modern and contemporary exhibitions
- Daejeon Arts Center which is home to local music and theater groups including the Daejeon Philharmonic Orchestra
- Laurent Beaudouin-designed Lee Ungno Museum, a large permanent collection of works by or related to the prominent Korean artist Lee Ungno
- Expo Science Park, built on the grounds of the former international exposition (Taejŏn Expo '93) is home to the Institute for Basic Science and the National Science Museum, Korea's flagship science museum which features a main exhibition hall highlighting harmony between nature, man, and technology, as well as dedicated buildings related to natural history, future technology, biosphere, a children's science museum, and an astronomical observatory.
- Geological Museum, belonging to the Korea Institute of Geoscience and Mineral Resources
- Daejeon Citizen's Observatory which houses a 10-inch refracting telescope and is the first citizen observatory in Korea

Other arts spaces in the city include the six-floor Daejeon Artist House, performing arts center, and the Natural Ecology Center at Daecheong Lake.

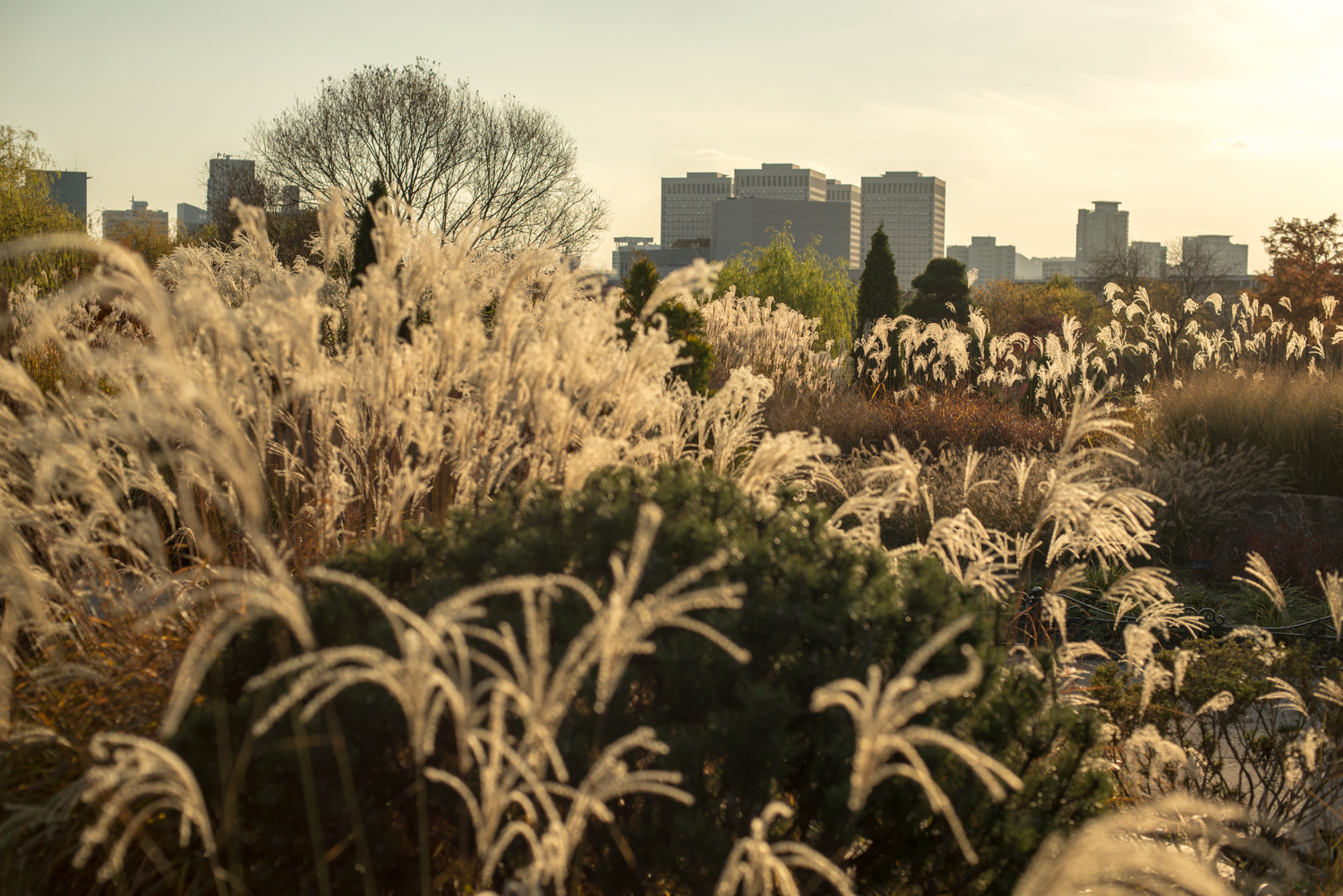
View from the East Garden in Daejeon Hanbat Arboritum

=== Parks and nature ===
Daejeon citizens are recognized for their fondness of nature, with most mountains, hot springs, and rivers freely open for public use. Many of the city's modern-day traditions, festivals, attractions, and industries are linked in some way to important mountains, rivers, and forests.

Eight "beautiful sights" are designated by city government, including the mountains Sikjangsan, Bomunsan, Gubongsan (구봉산), Jangtaesan, and Gyejoksan, the lake Daecheonghosu, as well as Yuseong Foot Spa, and Expo Science Park, which includes landmarks such as the Hanbit Tower and Expo Bridge. The Daejeon Hanbat Arboretum, built on the former parking lots of the World Expo, also holds the distinction of being the largest manmade arboretum in Korea.

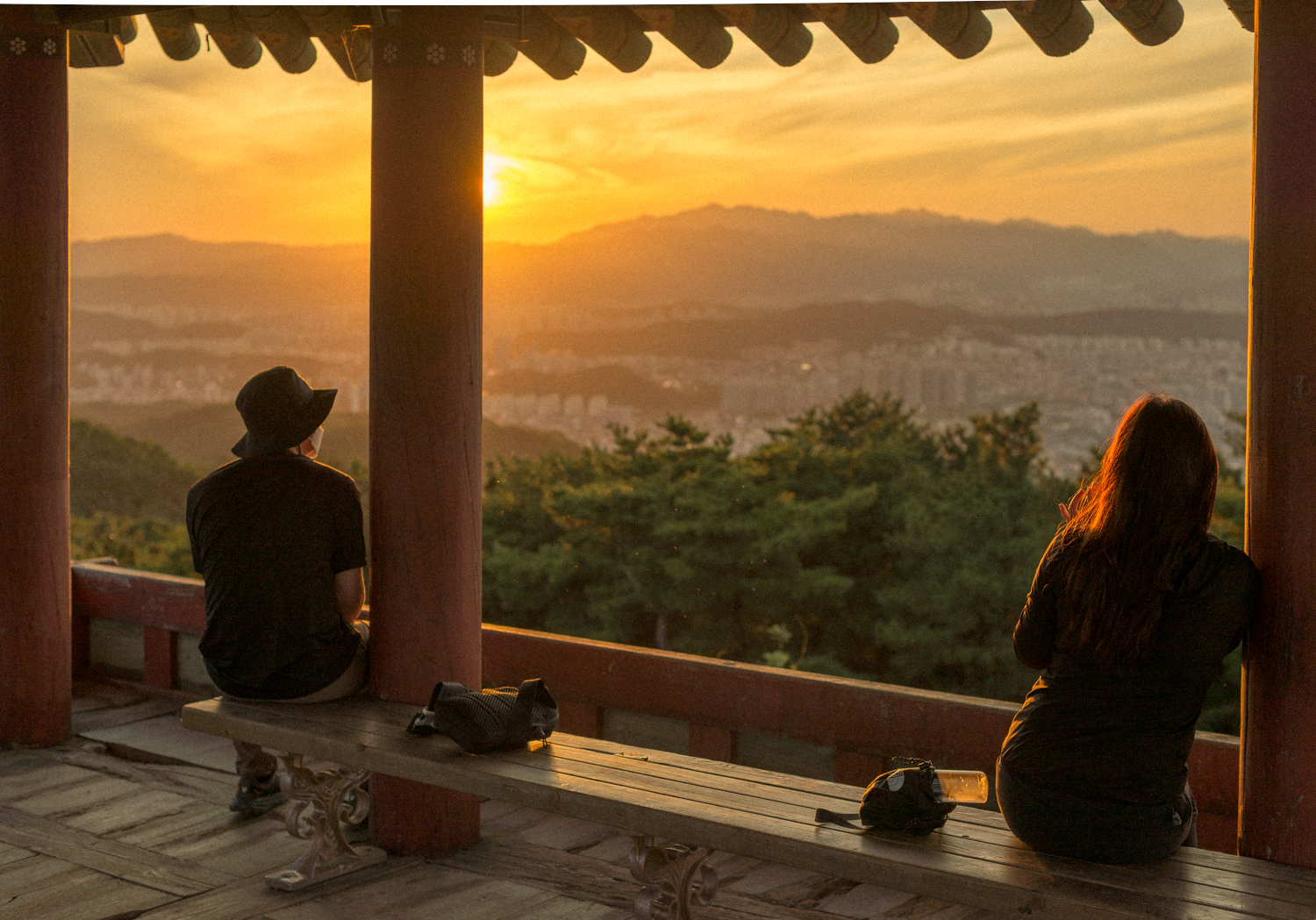
Two people viewing sunset from Bomunsan (mountain) Fortress in Daejeon, Korea

Overlooking Daejeon from the south, Bomunsan Mountain park was established as a park in 1965. The park contains water springs, trails, Buddhist temples, and some heritage sites dating back as far as the Bronze Age. Facilities include a nature healing center, outdoor concert hall, and Daejeon O-World, a theme park which includes Daejeon Zoo, Joy Land, and Flower Land. The park is home to 160 species of 600 animals, 17 rides and themed gardens including Sounds garden, Herb Garden, and Rose Garden.

=== Media ===
Daejeon is a provincial center for the television, newspaper and publishing industries. Major television broadcasting companies, such as KBS and MBC, have branches in Daejeon; Daejeon Broadcasting Corporation (TJB) is a local television broadcaster based in Daejeon. Cable TV services are available in most apartments. Eight (8) channels of Mobile TV are provided with the digital radio channels. Several FM radio stations provide news and music on the air. KBS, MBC, TJB have their FM radio channels, there are Christian radio channels, FEBC and CBS, and traffic news channel TBN. Daejeon Ilbo is the major local newspaper which covers South Chungcheong Province.

=== Festivals ===
Daejeon is home to both traditional folk festivals, and contemporary cultural celebrations. These include the Daejeon Science Festival, the Hyo Culture Root Festival, a Full Moon Festival, Yuseong Oncheon Festival, Geumgang Rojas Festival, Diku Festival, Gyejoksan Mountain Manbal Festival, Gyeonwoojik Women Festival, and various international food, drink, and music festivals throughout the seasons.

== Sports ==
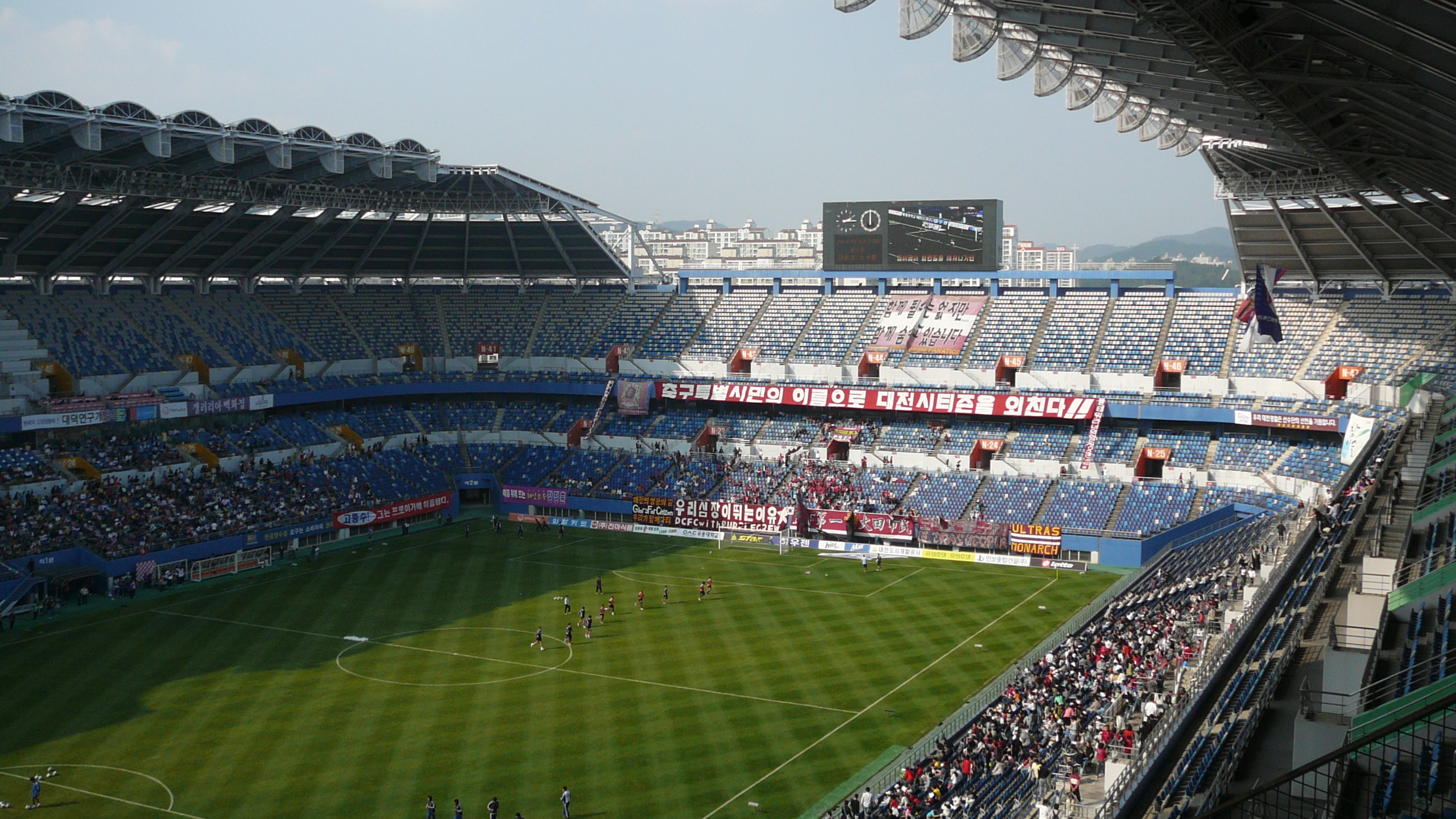
Daejeon World Cup Stadium

Daejeon is home to multiple professional teams and national and internationally active sports facilities. The Daejeon World Cup Stadium was constructed for the 2002 FIFA World Cup, hosting several games including the South Korea vs. Italy match in the round of 16. The facility is now the home of the city's football club. The Daejeon Hanbat Sports Complex was built in 1964, and was one of the host sites of the 1986 Asian Games, and also hosted preliminaries during the 1988 Olympic Games in Seoul. Today, with several of the facilities renovated, it hosts the city's professional baseball, K3 League football, and volleyball teams. The city is also home to LPGA golfers Pak Se-ri and Jang Jeong, and is the hometown of former New York Mets left-handed reliever Dae-sung Koo.

=== Football ===
The city is home to the K League 1 football club Daejeon Hana Citizen, playing home games at Daejeon World Cup Stadium, and the K3 League side Daejeon Korail, which plays home games at Daejeon Hanbat Sports Complex.

=== Baseball ===
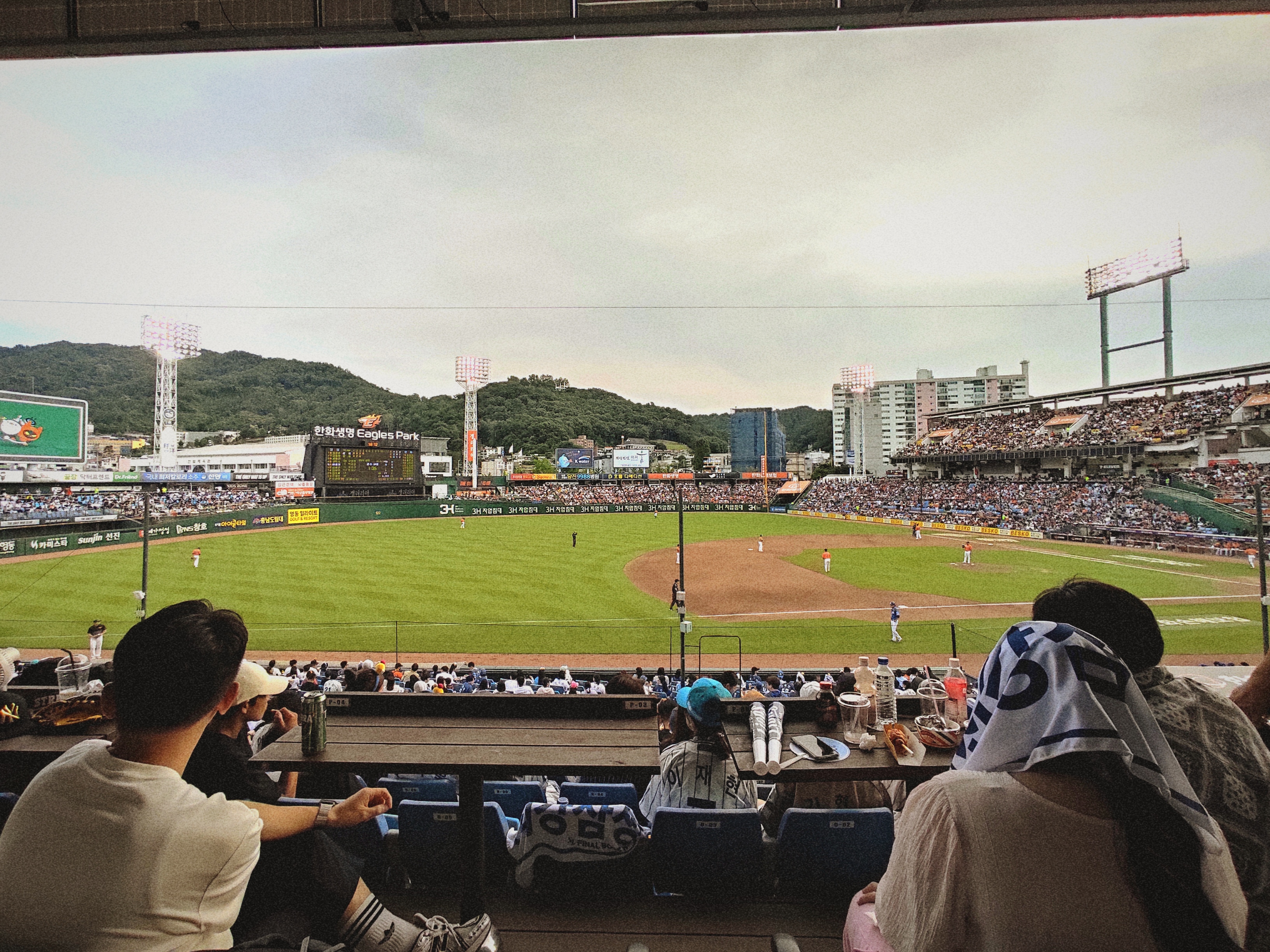
Daejeon Hanbat Baseball Stadium

The Hanwha Eagles of the KBO League were founded in Daejeon in 1985. Between 1986 and 2024, they played their home games at the Daejeon Hanbat Baseball Stadium, built in Busa-dong in 1964, with an iconic view of Bomunsan in the outfield. The stadium was renovated and expanded in 2013, moving the outfield wall and expanding seating to 13,000. Before the 2025 season, they moved to the newly-built Daejeon Hanwha Life Ballpark with a capacity of 20,000 spectators.

=== Volleyball ===
The V-League men's volleyball club Daejeon Samsung Fire Bluefangs and the V-League women's volleyball club CheongKwanJang Red Sparks both play their home games at the Chungmu Gymnasium of the Daejeon Hanbat Sports Complex.

== Transportation ==
Daejeon is a center of transportation in South Korea, where two major expressways, Gyeongbu Expressway and Honam Expressway Branch, and two major railway lines, Gyeongbu railway and Honam railway, are joined. Travel time between Daejeon and Seoul using the KTX high-speed rail system is about 50 minutes. The nearest airport is Cheongju Airport, about a thirty-minute drive north. Direct bus connections to Incheon International Airport exist.

=== Bus ===
Daejeon has an extensive bus network that connects all districts of the city and surrounding areas. The system includes both local and intercity routes, operated primarily by Daejeon Metropolitan Express Transit Corporation and private bus companies. The main bus terminals, such as Daejeon Complex Terminal and Yuseong Intercity Bus Terminal, provide connections to other major cities across South Korea.

=== Subway ===
One line, Daejeon Subway Line 1, of a planned five-line subway system has been operating since 17 April 2007 (partial operations on this line began on 16 March 2006). This subway line connects Daejeon Station, located in the original city centre, with the more modern and more recently developed sections of this city, including Dunsan, where the city hall and a number of national government buildings are located.

Notable differences between the Daejeon subway and the Seoul subway include narrower cars, no doors connecting cars, four cars per train rather than ten, and storage space under the seats for use by passengers. Originally, plastic tokens for toll were read by a proximity sensor when entering the turnstiles, and then inserted into a slot when exiting. The design of the tokens allowed them to be used for advertising. The system now employs the T-money system, a rechargeable series of Smart cards and other "smart" devices used for paying transportation fares. Platform screen doors are installed in the subway stations.

=== Cycling ===
The name of the public bicycle in South Korea is different for each region, and the name of the public bicycle in Daejeon is Tashu (Korean: 타슈). Tashu is an unmanned rental public bicycle service operated in Daejeon since 2008, and the basic rental fee is 500 won, and if one purchases a daily ticket, the bicycle can be used within an hour on that day.

== Gallery ==
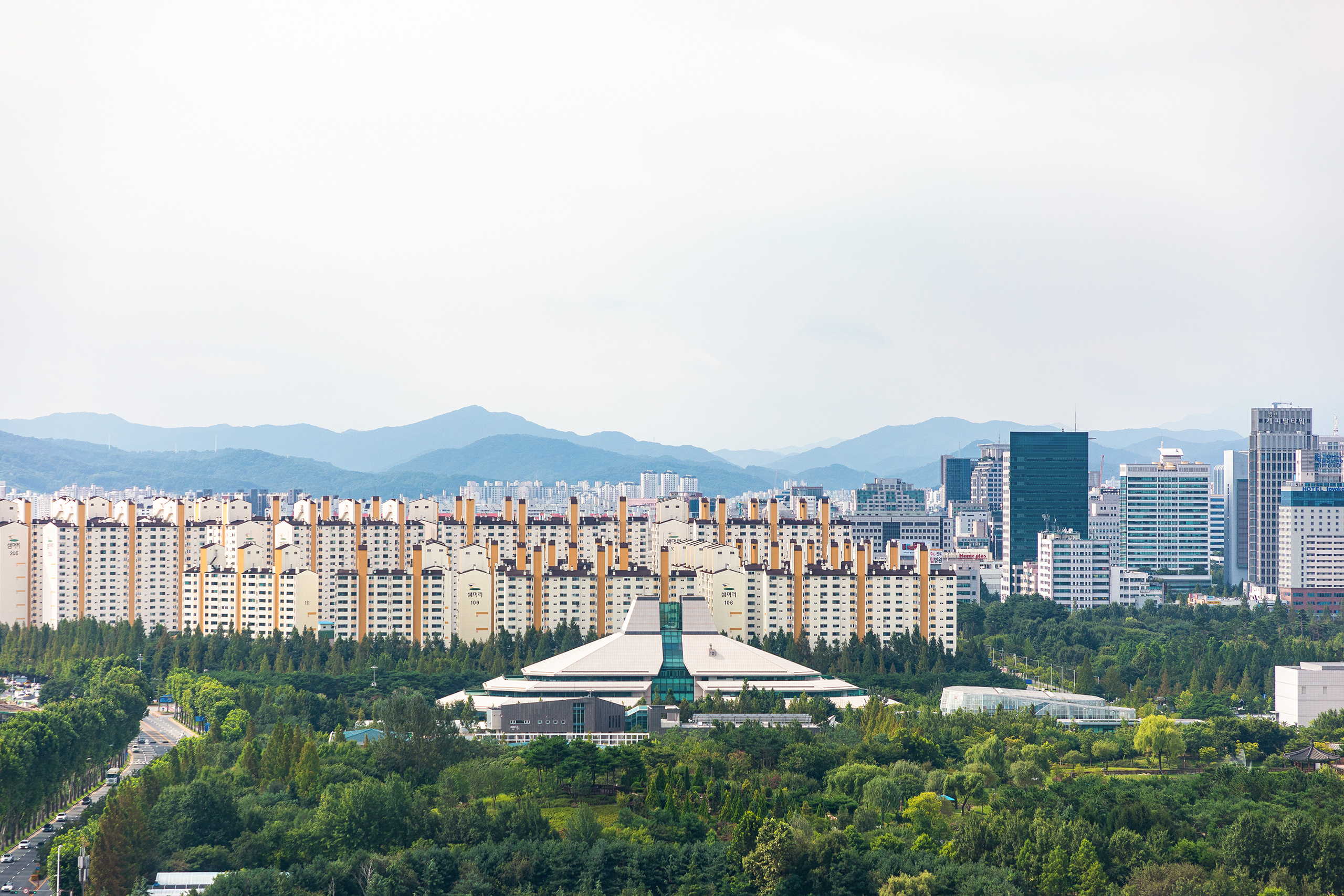
Pyeongsong Youth Cultural Center and blocks of flats of Dunsan-dong district from Lotte City Hotel Daejeon in 2020

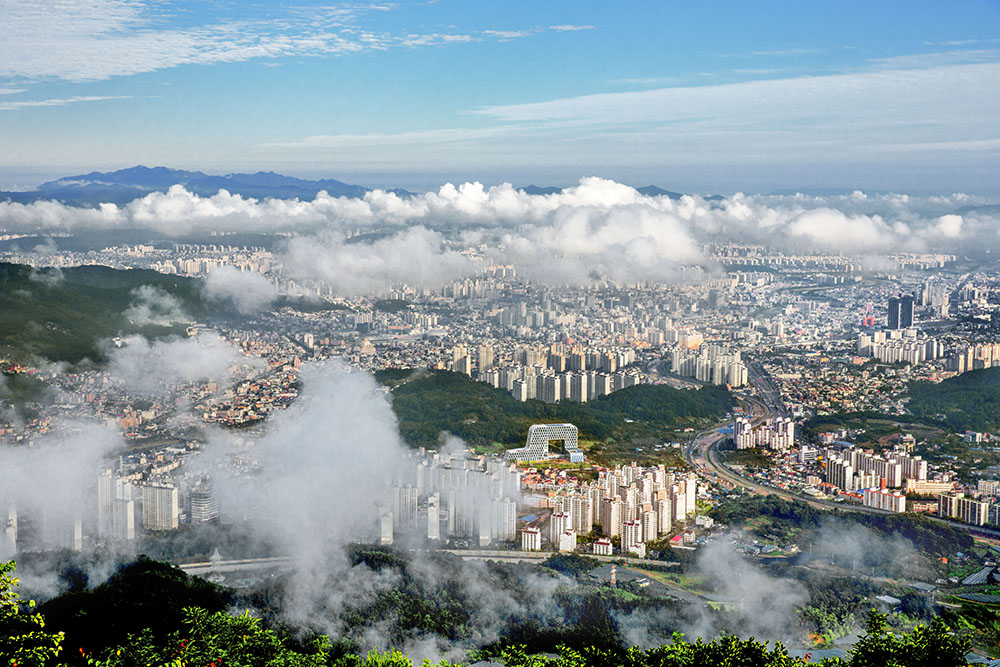
View of Daejeon from Sikjang Mountain, with Dong-gu in the foreground

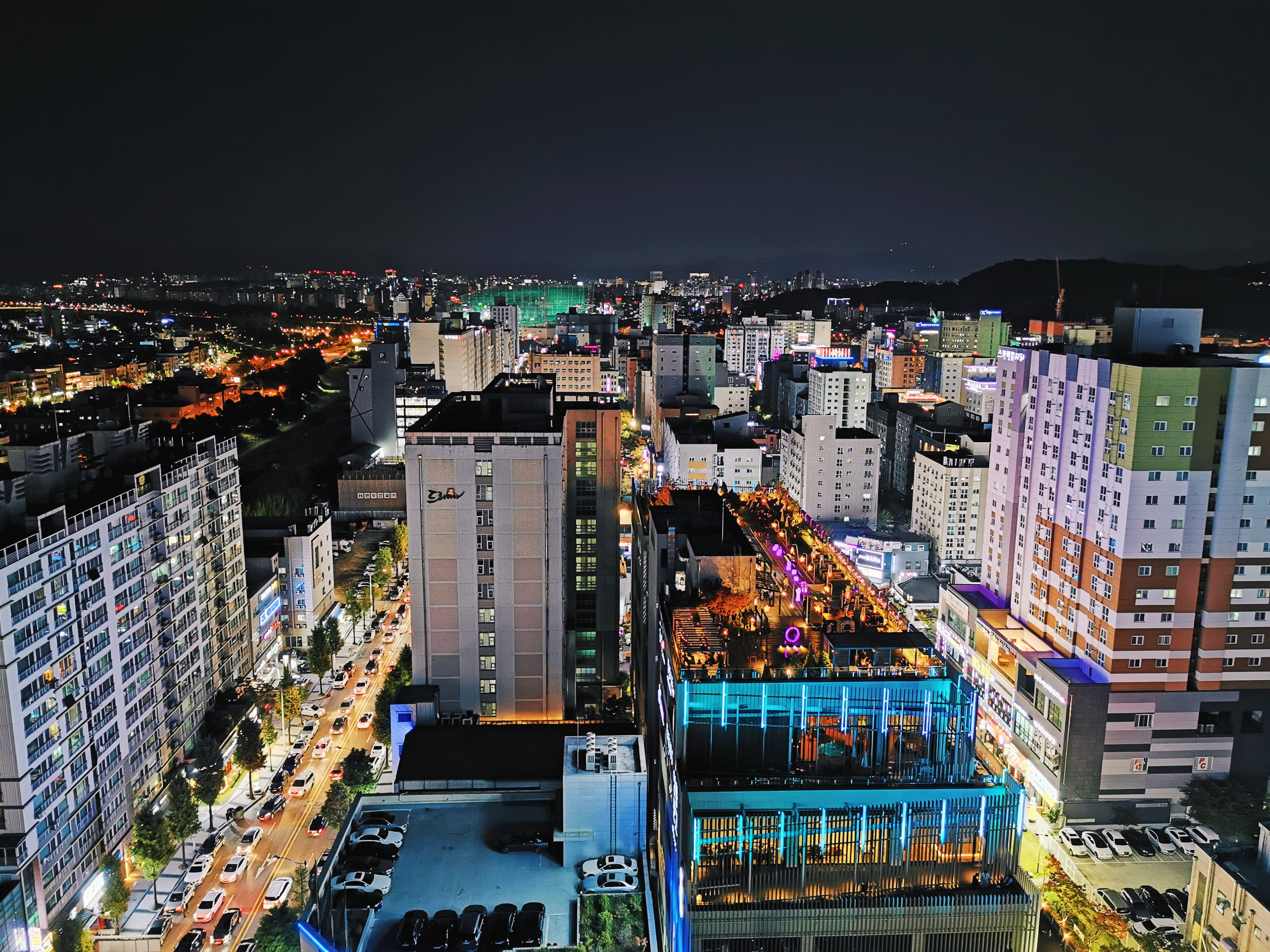
Daejeon at night

== Notable people ==
- An Yu-jin, singer (IZ*ONE, Ive)
- Kim Joon-ho, comedian
- Do Ji-han, actor
- Choi Sung-bong, singer
- Chung Eun-yong, policeman and activist
- Han Eun-jung, actress
- Yoon Joo-hee, actress
- Hyuk, singer (VIXX)
- Hong Jin-ho, television personality and former professional StarCraft player
- Hyesung, singer (Vanner)
- Ivy, singer and musical actress
- Kwon Sang-woo, actor
- Lee Na-eun, singer and actress (April), born in Cheongju. She moved to Daejeon before entering elementary school.
- Lee Yoon-ki, film director
- Rhie Won-bok, cartoonist
- Pak Se-ri, former professional golfer
- Joon Park, artist
- Ryu Su-jeong, singer (Lovelyz)
- Oh Sang-uk, fencer
- Shin Chaeho, independence activist, historian, anarchist, nationalist and the founder of Korean ethnic nationalist historiography
- Shin Seung-hun, singer-songwriter
- Song Joong-ki, actor
- Sullyoon, singer (NMIXX)
- Chen, singer, dancer, model and member of (Exo, Exo-CBX)
- Kyu Ha Kim, judoka
- Baek Ye-rin, singer (15&)
- Jamie, singer (15&)
- Jo Bo-ah, actress, model and host
- Park Eun-ooh, singer-songwriter, music producer, vocalist and lyricist
- Sunghoon, singer (Enhypen)
- Son Suk-ku, actor
- Choi Jung-in, singer
- Kim Woo-seok, singer (X1, Up10tion) and actor
- FlaSh, StarCraft: Brood War and StarCraft II player
- Paul Sun-Hyung Lee, actor
- Kim Dong-hyun, singer (AB6IX)
- Yeo One, singer (Pentagon) and actor
- Kwak Dong-yeon, actor
- Heejin, singer (Loona, Loona 1/3, Artms)
- Yoon Seo-yeon, singer (tripleS)
- Park Shi-on, singer (tripleS)
- Lee Hae-in, figure skater
- Kim Duk-soo, traditional musician

== Sister cities ==
Daejeon has sister city relationships with the following fourteen cities:

- Ōda, Japan (1987)
- Seattle, United States (1989)
- Budapest, Hungary (1994)
- Nanjing, China (1994)
- Calgary, Canada (1996)
- Guadalajara, Mexico (1997)
- Uppsala, Sweden (1999)
- Novosibirsk, Russia (2001)
- Brisbane, Australia (2002)
- Bình Dương Province, Vietnam (2005)
- Sapporo, Japan (2010)
- Durban, South Africa (2011)
- Shenyang, China (2013)
- Montgomery County, United States (2017)

== See also ==
- List of cities in South Korea
