= Hanbat National University =

University in Daejeon, South Korea

Coordinates: 36.35057°N 127.30116°E

- Type: National (Public)
- Established: May 20, 1927
- President: Oh, Yong Jun
- Students: 9,037
- Undergraduates: 8,486
- Postgraduates: 551
- Location: 125 Dongseodae-ro, Yuseong-Gu, Daejeon, Republic of Korea (South Korea)
- Campus: Daejeon Campus (Yuseong), Daedeok Campus
- Mascot: Eagle
- Website: www.hanbat.ac.kr

Hanbat National University (HBNU) is a university in Daejon, South Korea, established in 1927.

The university is composed of six colleges having different departments within them, and one separate faculty. All six colleges offer study at the undergraduate and graduate levels.

The university has been chosen for the following national-level projects: an Autonomous Improvement University Project, Leaders in Industry-University Cooperation+ (LIUC+), the Project to Nurture Universities to Lead Start-ups and Management of Systematic Career System for students.

== Colleges ==
College of Engineering: five departments

- Department of Mechanical Engineering
- Department of Advanced Materials Engineering
- Department of Chemistry and Biological Engineering
- Department of Industrial Management Engineering
- Department of Building Services Engineering

College of Information Technology: four departments

- Department of Electrical Engineering
- Department of Electronics and Control Engineering
- Department of Computer Engineering
- Department of Information Communications Engineering

College of Construction, Environment and Design: six departments

- Department of Civil and Environmental Engineering
- Department of Architectural Engineering
- Department of Architectural Design
- Department of Urban Engineering
- Department of Visual Communication Design
- Department of Industrial Design

College of Humanities: three departments

- Department of English Language and Literature
- Department of Japanese
- Department of Chinese

College of Business and Economics: two departments

- Department of Economics
- Department of Business Administration and Accounting

College of Life-long Education

Faculty of Basic Convergence Education

== Research institutes ==
- Institute of Construction Safety Technology
- Urban and Environment Research Institute
- Energy and Clean Technology Research Center
- Institute of Fusion Technology for Production
- Institute of Environmental Preservation and Disaster Prevention
- Wireless Communication Research Institute
- Institute of Environment and Ecological Restoration
- Human-centered Future Fusion Center
- Institute of Quality Innovation
- Institute of Production and Environmental Design
- Appropriate Technology Institute
- China Trade Strategy Institute
- Urban Architecture Center
- Institute of Korean Language and Culture
- Institute of Advanced Renewable Energy
- Railway Technology Center
- Design Future Vision Center
- U-city Cluster Institute
- Public Design Institute
- Future Convergence Center for Humans
- Research Center of Optimal Technology
- Institute of Cultural Contents Technology
- Entrepreneurial Research Center of Industry-University Connection

== See also ==
- List of colleges and universities in South Korea
- Education in South Korea
