= Sikjangsan =

Mountain in Daejeon, South Korea

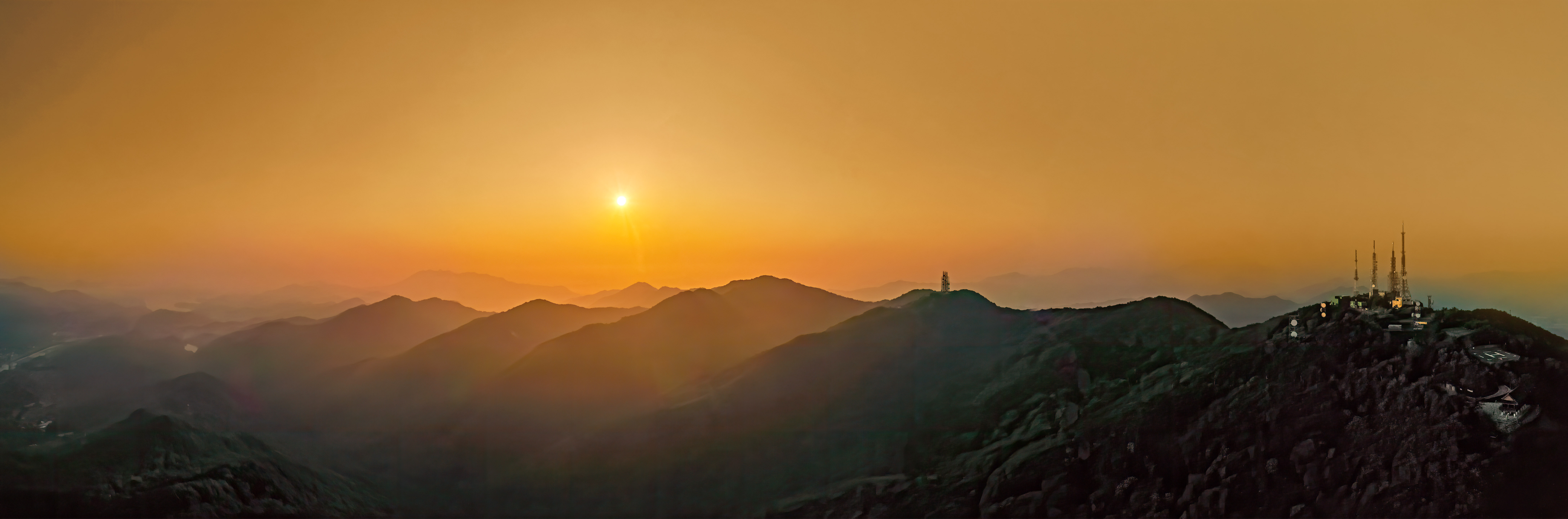
- Sunrise at Sikjangsan

Highest point
- Elevation: 596 m (1,955 ft)
- Coordinates: 36°17′42″N 127°28′48″E

Geography
- Location: Daejeon, South Korea

Korean name
- Hangul: 식장산
- Hanja: 食藏山
- RR: Sikjangsan
- MR: Sikchangsan

Sikjangsan is a mountain located in Dong District, Daejeon, South Korea. It has an elevation of 596 m (1,955 ft).

== Gallery ==
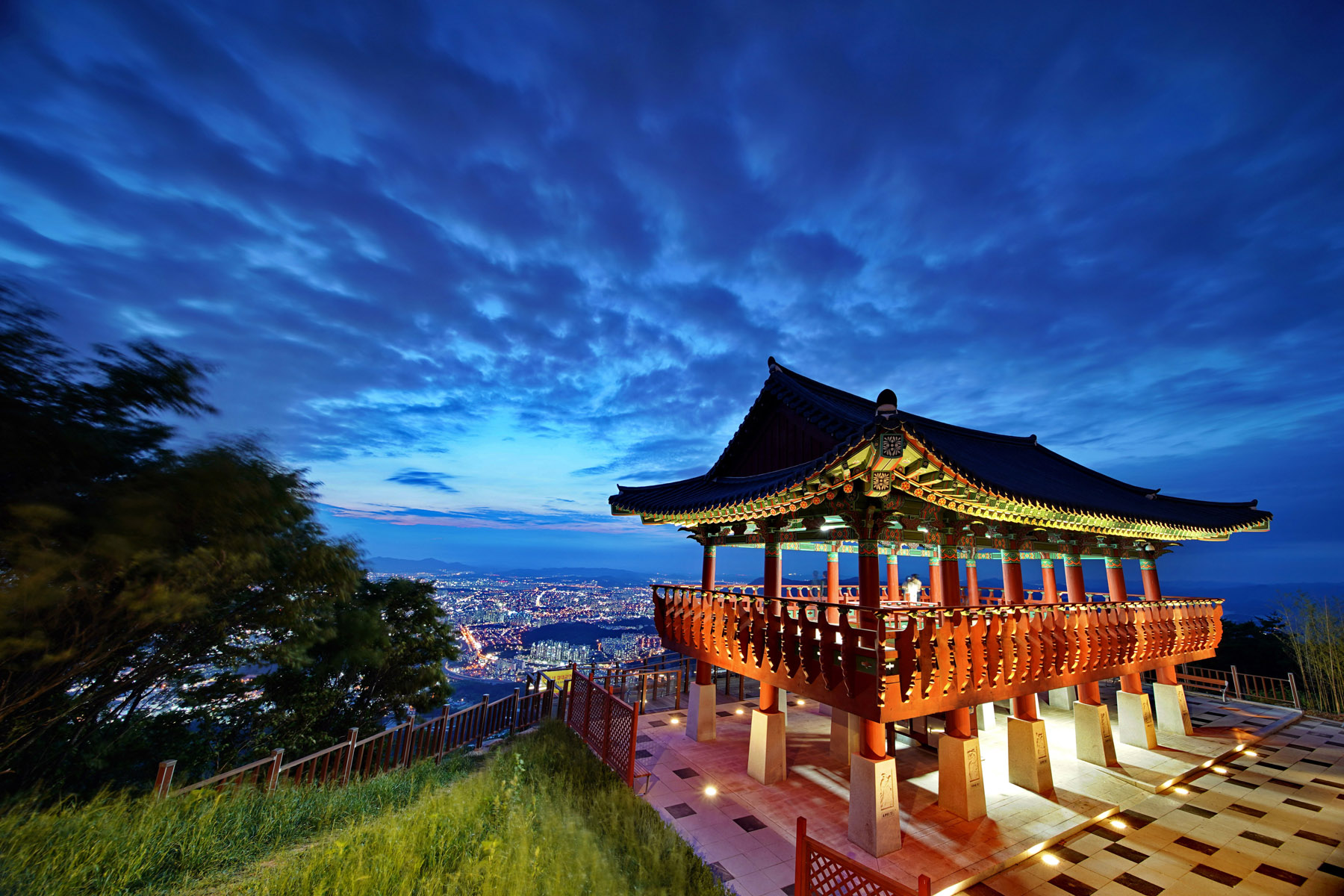
Sikjangsan Observatory night view

== See also ==
- Geography of Korea
- List of mountains in Korea
- List of mountains by elevation
