= Tristar =

Tristar or TriStar (meaning "three star") may refer to:

== TriStar media organizations ==
- Columbia TriStar Home Video, a home video distribution studio now known as Sony Pictures Home Entertainment
- Columbia TriStar Television, a television production/distribution studio now known as Sony Pictures Television
- TriStar Music, a record label owned by Sony BMG
- TriStar Pictures, a film production/distribution cinema studio owned by Sony
- TriStar Productions, a film and television production company
- TriStar Television, a television production studio reformed in 2015
- Tri-Star Video, a video production studio now known as Sony Pictures Home Entertainment

== Arts and entertainment ==
- Tristar (band), a Kazakh pop music band
- Tristar (film), a 1996 Hong Kong film directed by Tsui Hark
- Tristar 64, an add-on for the Nintendo 64 game console
- Tri-star, an add-on for the Super NES game console, see Super 8

== Other uses ==
- Tri-star (wheel arrangement), a design for climbing over obstructions or stairs
- Tri-Star Industries, a Canadian ambulance manufacturer
- TriStar Greenview Regional Hospital
- Tristar Gym, a mixed martial arts training centre in Montreal
- TriStar Motorsports, an American stock car racing team
- Tristar Productions, a sports memorabilia company
- Tristar and Red Sector Incorporated, a demogroup formed in 1990
- Tristar Worldwide, a British private hire company
- Tristar or three stars in Japanese; see Samsung § Etymology
- Lockheed L-1011 TriStar, a widebodied airliner
  - Lockheed TriStar (RAF), L-1011-based tankers used by the Royal Air Force
- A strawberry cultivar
- A common nickname for the Flag of Tennessee

== See also ==
- Three star (disambiguation)
- Columbia TriStar (disambiguation), various uses
