= Samsung (disambiguation) =

Samsung (Korean: 삼성; Hanja: 三星; RR: Samseong; lit. 3 stars) is a South Korean conglomerate.

Samsung or Sam Sung may also refer to:

== Places ==
- Sam Sung district (Thai: ซำสูง), Khon Kaen, Thailand
- Samsung Plaza, Seohyeon-dong, Bundang, Seongnam, South Korea; a shopping plaza
- Samsung Town, Seocho-gu, Seoul, South Korea; an office park

== People ==
- Lee Sam-sung, South Korean wrestler, who won gold in Graeco-Roman Wrestling at the 1986 Asian Games

== Other uses ==
- Samsung Cup (disambiguation), several competitions

== See also ==
- Samsung Hub (disambiguation)
- 三星 (disambiguation) (Korean: Samsung)
- Samseong (disambiguation) (alternate romanization of Korean 'Samsung')
- Three star (disambiguation) (Korean: Sam Sung)
