= Samseong (disambiguation) =

Samseong or Sam Seong, may refer to:

== Places ==
- Samseong station, Seoul Subway Line 2, Teheran-ro, Gangnam, Seoul, South Korea
- Samseong station (Gyeongsan), Gyeongbu Rail Line, Gyeongsan Province, South Korea
- Samseong-dong (disambiguation) (literally, Samseong Ward), several wards in South Korea
- Samseong River, Anyang, Gyeonggi, South Korea
- Samseong-hyeol (Korean: Cave of the Three Clans), Port of Jeju, City of Jeju, Jeju Island, Jeju Province, South Korea

== People ==
- Samseong Clans (the clans of Ko, Pu, Yang), the founding people of Port of Jeju, City of Jeju, Jeju Island, Jeju Province, South Korea
- Seong Sam-seong (died 1456, Korean: 성삼성; Hanja: 成三省), Korean scholar, brother to Sŏng Sammun

== Other uses ==
- Samsung (Korean: 삼성; Hanja: 三星; RR: Samseong; lit. 3 stars), a South Korean conglomerate
- Samseong mythology (3 Gods mythology) of Jeju island
- Sam Seong (Korean: 삼성, romanized: Sam Seong), the 3 departments of the Three Departments and Six Ministries in the Kingdom of Korea government

== See also ==
- 三星 (disambiguation) (Korean: Samseong)
- Samsung (disambiguation) (alternate romanization of Korean 'Samsung')
- Three star (disambiguation) (Korean: Sam Seong)
