= Sansing =

Sansing is a surname. Notable people with the surname include:

- David Sansing (1933–2019), American historian and author
- Mike Sansing, American collegiate baseball coach

== See also ==
- Sanxing (disambiguation), transliteration of a Chinese term
