= Shyam Singh (politician) =

Indian politician

Member of the Haryana Legislative Assembly
- Incumbent
- Assumed office 2024
- Preceded by: Bishan Lal Saini
- Constituency: Radaur
- In office 2014–2019
- Preceded by: Bishan Lal Saini
- Succeeded by: Bishan Lal Saini
- Constituency: Radaur

Personal details
- Born: 20 February 1948 (age 78)
- Party: Bharatiya Janata Party
- Spouse: Bimla Devi
- Education: Kurukshetra university, Haryana (B. A. Philosophy)
- Profession: Agriculture

Shyam Singh is a former member of the Haryana Legislative Assembly from the Bharatiya Janata Party representing the Radaur Vidhan Sabha Constituency in Haryana.
