= Shyam Singh =

Shyam Singh may refer to:

- Shyam Singh (politician), Indian politician
- Sham Singh Attariwala, warrior during First Anglo Sikh War
- Shyam Singh Shashi, Indian writer
- Shyam Singh Yadav, Indian politician

== See also ==
- Sam Sing (disambiguation)
- Samsing, Matiali, Malbazar, Jalpaiguri, West Bengal, India; a hill village
- Shyam Singha Roy, 2021 Indian film by Rahul Sankrityan
