= Dae-dong station =

Metro station in Daejeon, South Korea

103 대동 (우송대) Dae-dong (Woosong Univ.)
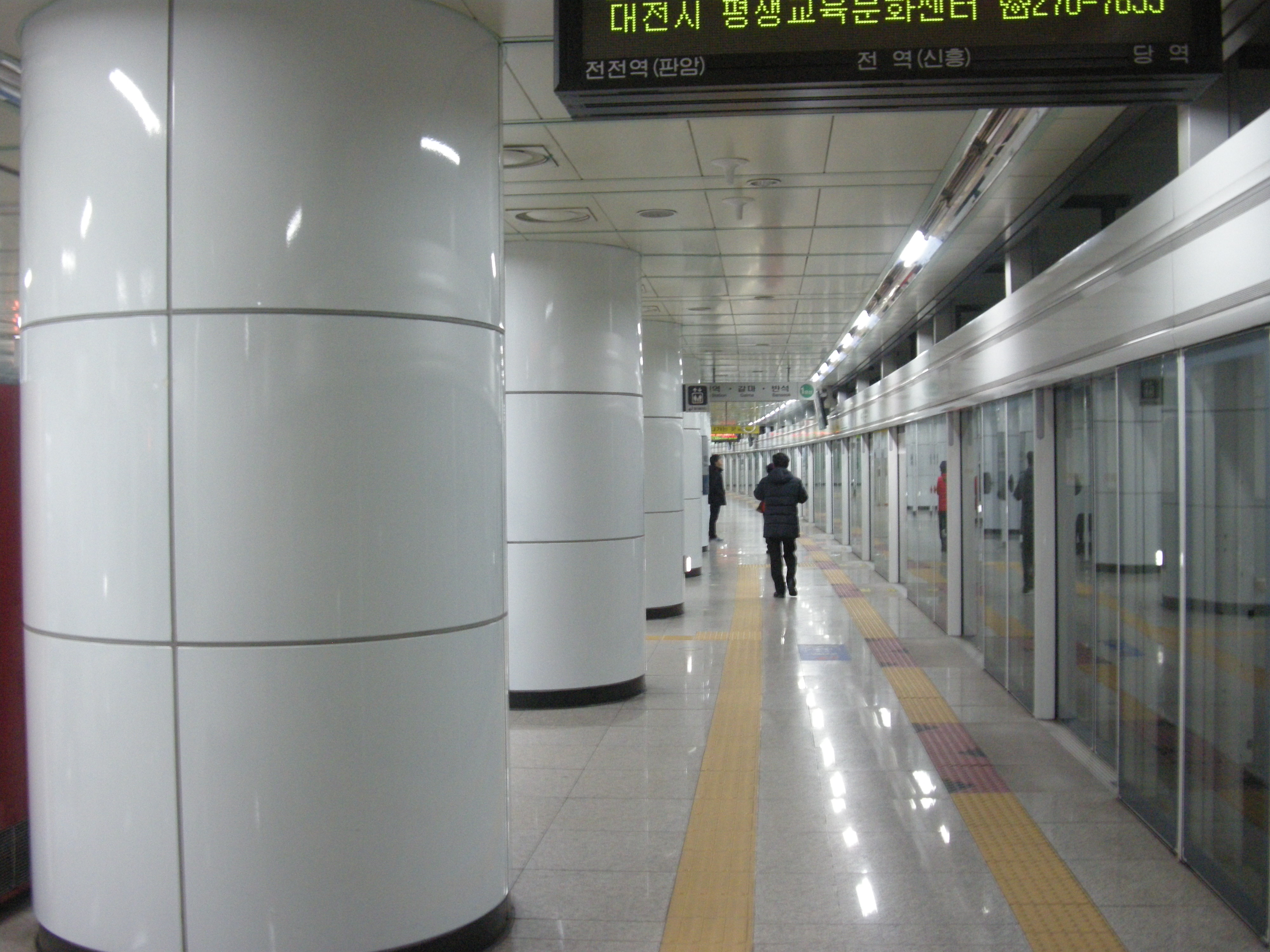

Korean name
- Hangul: 대동역
- Hanja: 大洞驛
- Revised Romanization: Daedong-yeok
- McCune–Reischauer: Taedong-yŏk

General information
- Location: Dae-dong, Dong District, Daejeon; South Korea
- Coordinates: 36°19′46″N 127°26′34″E
- Operator: Daejeon Metropolitan Express Transit Corporation
- Line: Daejeon Metro Line 1
- Platforms: 1
- Tracks: 2

Construction
- Structure type: Underground

Other information
- Station code: 103

History
- Opened: 16 March 2006; 20 years ago

Services
Preceding station	Daejeon Metro	Following station
Sinheung towards Panam	Line 1	Daejeon Station towards Banseok
Location

Dae-dong Station (Korean: 대동역; Hanja: 大洞驛) is a station of the Daejeon Metro Line 1 in Dae-dong, Dong District, Daejeon, South Korea.

== Station Layout ==
G	Street Level	Exits
L1; Concourse	Lobby	Customer Service, Shops, Vending machines, ATMs
L2; Platforms	Southbound	← Line 1 toward Panam (Sinheung)
L2; Platforms	Island platform, doors open on the left
L2; Platforms	Northbound	→ Line 1 toward Banseok (Daejeon Station) →
