= Stairclimber =

Type of hand truck

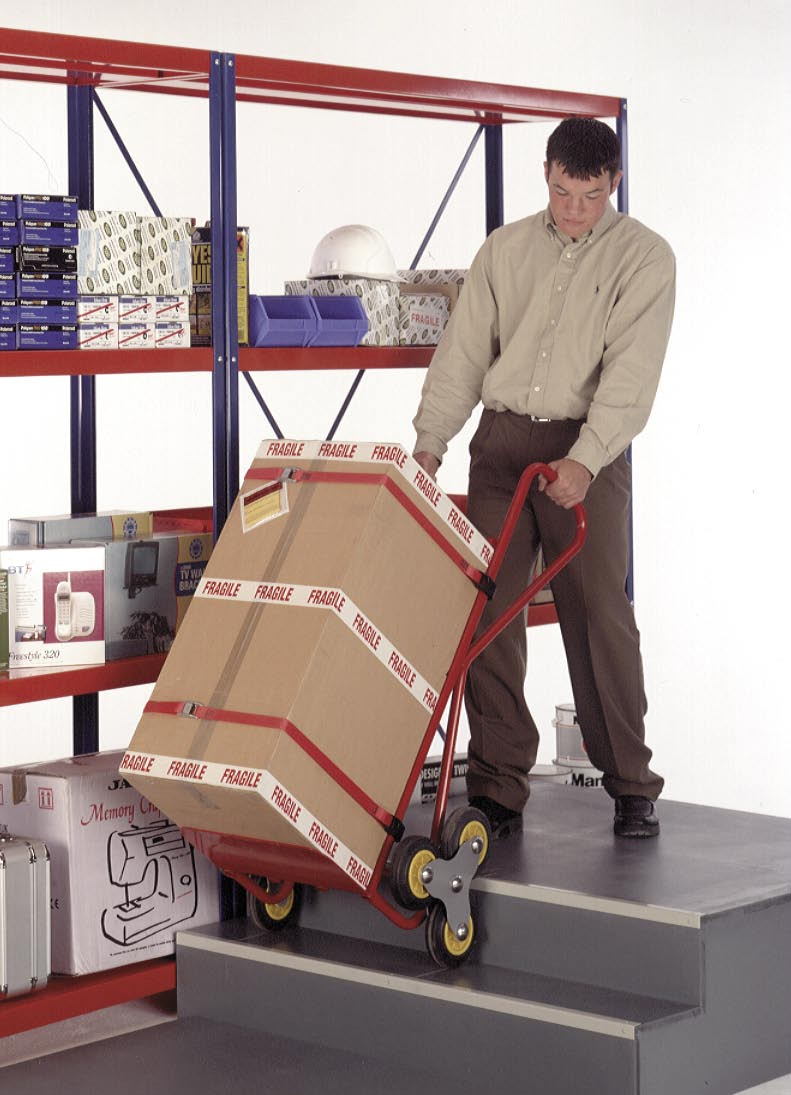
Stairclimber wheels

A stair climber is a type of trolley fitted with rotating wheels or tracks so that it can be pushed or pulled up or down steps or a stairway. Stair climbers can be manual or battery-powered, and are commonly found in wheel, track, push arm, or walker variants.

Powered electric stair climbers are available in many variants, both in manufacture and mechanical operation, with the most common being push arm and walker variants due to size, speed, and mobility. Tracked versions offer the greatest safe working limit (SWL) with regard to the load being moved, whilst push arm and walker variants offer greater speed and ease of operation.

== Manual stairclimber wheels ==
Manual stairclimber wheels can be fitted to hand trucks (sack trucks) and as the name implies, are designed to aid the moving of goods up or down stairs. This type of stairclimber relies on a wheel configuration known as tri-star, three wheels set into a triangle configuration replacing the standard wheel on either side. Stairclimber wheels can sometimes be problematic when trying to turn on flat ground as four wheels in a fixed position will be in contact with the ground at all times unless a locking mechanism is built into the trolley.

This form of stairclimber has a maximum capacity of around 60-80kg and is only found in the manual non-electric variety and very common amongst courier drivers and for lightweight deliveries.

== Tracked stair climber type ==
The tracked type of stair climber is usually electrically powered, and can traverse stairs mechanically with loads up to 1,000 kg (2,205 lb). Mechanically the operation is identical to continuous track type vehicles, this method of transportation is very robust and can negotiate steep stairs and other awkward terrain, its downsides are size and weight, but like continuous track vehicles with independent track control they can rotate on the spot by operating the individual tracks in opposite directions. Many models come with the additional feature of a hydraulic load balance enabling the load to be kept upright whilst traversing stairways. As a feature this enables the movement of objects that must be kept upright during transportation like air conditioning units where refrigerant fluid can escape or damage the unit if it is not sealed.

Smaller tracked types are also available to move smaller weight ranges. These machines are also slower than push-arm and walker varieties but have the advantage of placing no weight on the operator. The load is in full contact with the stairs at all times and allows the operator zero load whilst stair climbing.

== Stair walkers type ==
The stair walker types use a long screw thread to extend and retract a 'foot' from the position at which the load is held. The two moving plates allow the item to be stepped down an arbitrary number of steps at any one time. Some models using this approach also employ a third section to allow the load to be manipulated up and down independently of the base and wheel sections.

This type is popular for moving vending machines, arcade machines, server cabinets, and safes.

== Push-arm type ==
The push arm type stair climbers have an arm fitted to the bottom of the truck that folds out and down, pushing on the step above and in so doing lifting the truck up in an arc to rest on that step. Repetitions of this movement allow the truck to move up the stairs. The mechanical opposite of this motion allows the unit move down stairs, many units also employ a forward only braking system to stop the stair climber rolling of the edge of a step.

== See also ==
- Handcart
- Shopping trolley (caddy)
- Wheelbarrow
