= Tri-star (wheel arrangement) =

Design for climbing over obstructions or stairs

A Tri-Star wheel assembly rotating through a hole

The tri-star is a novel wheel design—originally by Robert and John Forsyth, assigned to Lockheed in 1967—in which three wheels are arranged in an upright triangle with two on the ground and one above them. If either of the wheels in contact with the ground gets stuck, the whole system rotates over the obstruction.

== Design ==
In the tri-star wheel, all three satellite wheels are simultaneously powered through a mechanical linkage between each satellite wheel and a shaft concentric with the central hub. In the original patent, the direction of the vehicle is controlled through the differential steering.

== Applications ==
Lockheed modified an M2A2 105mm Light Howitzer and produced it from 1969-1977 with a drive unit and tri-star wheel system into an Auxiliary Propelled Howitzer they termed "Terra Star." The only surviving prototype is located at the Rock Island Arsenal Museum.

Perhaps the most famous application was the Landmaster, a unique armoured personnel carrier (APC) created as a movie prop for the 1977 film Damnation Alley.

Its common application is employed as a stairclimber.

== Gallery ==
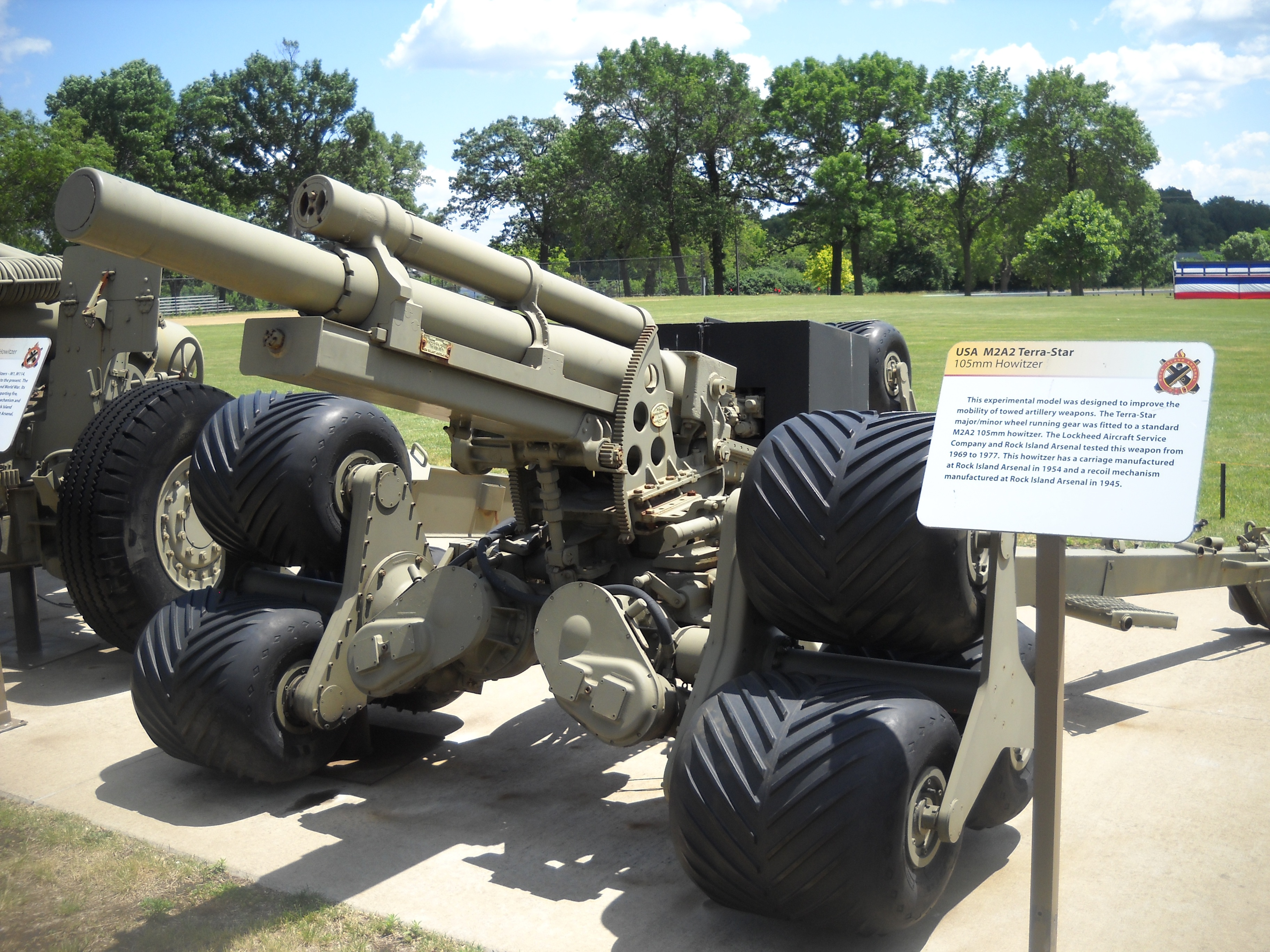
Front quarter view of the M2A2 Terra Star 105mm Auxiliary Propelled Howitzer

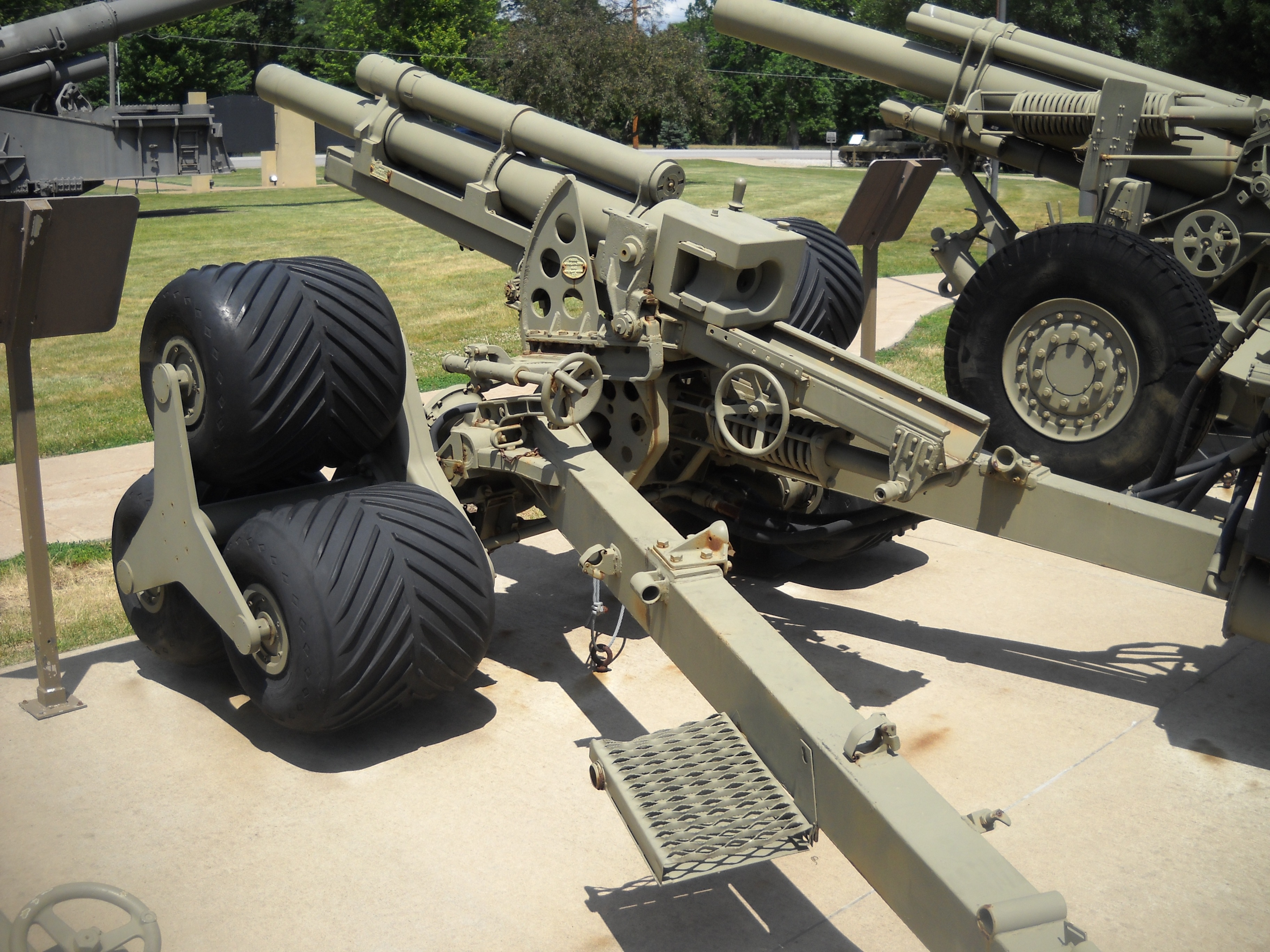
Rear quarter view of the M2A2 Terra Star 105mm Auxiliary Propelled Howitzer

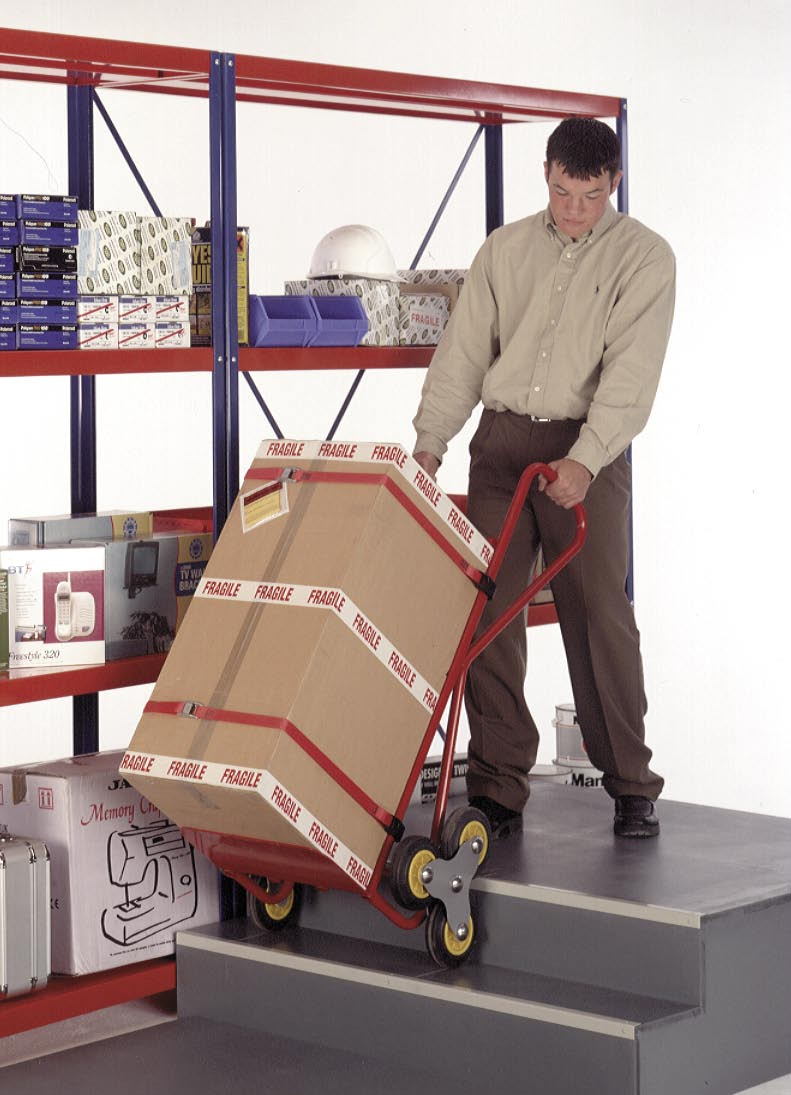
Stairclimber hand-truck with tri-star wheels
