= Samseong-dong (disambiguation) =

Samseong-dong can refer to several administrative wards in South Korean cities:

- Samseong-dong in Gangnam-gu, Seoul
- Samseong-dong, was called Sillim 6-dong and 10-dong, in Gwanak-gu, Seoul; See Sillim-dong.
- Samseong-dong, Daejeon in Dong-gu, Daejeon
- Samseong-dong, Iksan in Iksan, Jeollabuk-do
- Samseong-dong, Yangsan in Yangsan, Gyeongsangnam-do
