= Columbia TriStar =

Columbia TriStar was a subsidiary of Sony Pictures Entertainment that consisted of:

- Columbia TriStar Motion Picture Group, now Sony Pictures Motion Picture Group
- Columbia TriStar Home Video, later called Columbia TriStar Home Entertainment and now Sony Pictures Home Entertainment
- Columbia TriStar Television, active from 1994 to 2002
- Columbia TriStar Film Distributors, now Sony Pictures Releasing
- Columbia TriStar Film Distributors International, now Sony Pictures Releasing International
- Columbia TriStar Marketing Group, the only company continuously carrying the said name; not much is known about CTMG.

== See also ==
- SPE (disambiguation)
- Columbia (disambiguation)
- Tristar (disambiguation)
