= Landmaster =

- Promotional picture of the Landmaster from Damnation Alley
- Type: Amphibious APC
- Place of origin: Studio City, California

Service history
- In service: 1976 —
- Used by: (Fictional) 123rd Strategic Missile Wing, United States Air Force, Tipton Air Force Base, Mojave Desert, California, United States

Production history
- Designer: Dean Jeffries
- Manufacturer: Jeffries Automotive
- Unit cost: US$350,000
- Produced: 1976
- No. built: 1

Specifications
- Mass: 23,000 lb (10,000 kg)
- Length: 35 feet (11 m)
- Height: 12 feet (3.7 m)
- Crew: 4
- Armor: 3/8-inch (1 cm) steel plate
- Main armament: 2 top mounted rocket launchers 4 side mounted autocannons 2 front mounted retractable bazookas 2 front mounted flamethrowers
- Engine: 391-cubic-inch (6.41 L)
- Transmission: 5-speed Allison
- Suspension: 12-wheel tri-star
- Ground clearance: 2 feet (0.61 m)
- Steering system: hydraulic rams mounted in the center section junction

The Landmaster is a unique 12-wheeled amphibious articulated vehicle constructed by Dean Jeffries at Jeffries Automotive in Universal City, California, for the 1977 science fiction film Damnation Alley (itself based on a novel by Roger Zelazny). Despite the appearance of two Landmasters in the film (achieved with process photography and models), only one was built, at a cost of $350,000 in 1976.

== History ==
A staple of southern California car culture for many years, the Landmaster was parked in full view next to Dean Jeffries' automotive shop on Cahuenga Boulevard in North Hollywood, California from 1977 to 2005.

The Landmaster was sold to a private owner in 2005 and was restored to its original condition as featured in Damnation Alley. The Landmaster was then on the show car circuit for several years. In 2007 it was featured at the San Francisco Rod & Custom Show at the Cow Palace in San Francisco as part of special exhibit with other notable movie and TV cars.

Sometime in the late 2000s, the Landmaster was vandalized while in storage. The damage was relatively minor, but repair and restoration were required again. In March 2014, Landmaster was moved from its storage location in Campbell, California to a new maintenance and storage facility in central California (see photos and gallery).

In 2016, the Landmaster was moved to Gene Winfield's Custom Shop on Sierra Highway between Rosamond, California and Mojave, California, and in 2022, Winfield sold the vehicle to an unknown party, where it will undergo restoration.

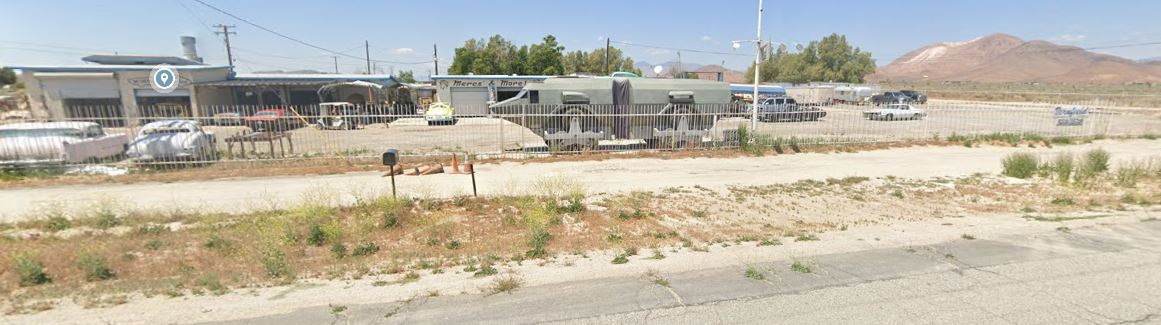

== Construction ==
Popular Science described the Landmaster:

Three independent drive sources running from a gasoline power plant. Uses semi truck parts in the drive train. Can operate with the front or rear wheel trinary out of commission. Side and top hatches on the main unit and rear and top on the after section. Full running lights and brake lights for urban street use. External video camera is mounted on the forward pylon located just behind the front top hatch. Could also house the antenna. All pylons are hardened and armored. Can operate in water and will remain sealed when fully submerged. Can float while half full of water.

While the film is fiction, the Landmaster vehicle is real. In the story, the Landmaster was designed to use as many standard truck parts as possible, so that any junkyard would have whatever was needed for repairs. The real Landmaster is powered by a 390-cubic-inch (6.4 L) Ford engine, and uses the rear-ends of two commercial trucks and an Allison automatic truck transmission. It features a fully functional, custom-built "tri-star" wheel arrangement, which could actually help it crawl over boulders. All 12 wheels are driven, but only eight are normally in contact with the road surface at any one time.

The vehicle was steered not by turning the front wheels, but by bending the middle section with hydraulic rams to effect a turn, similar to large construction equipment. The Landmaster's bodywork was made with 3/8-inch (1 cm) steel plate, which helped it tip the scales at over 10 tons. The design's strength allowed it to survive a 25-foot (7.6 m) jump during testing with no damage.

== Gallery ==
Landmaster features

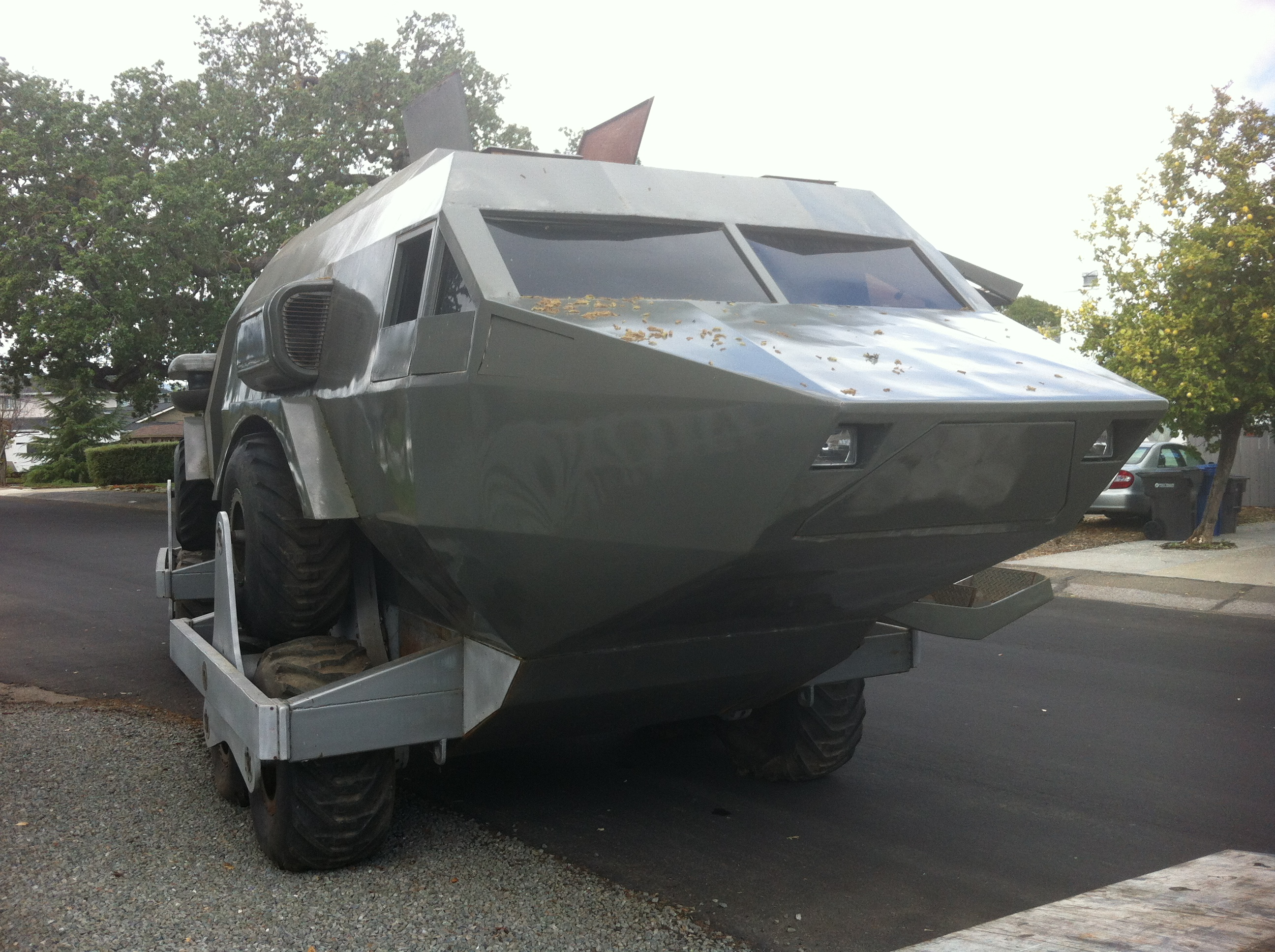
Front view, just prior to loading on trailer.

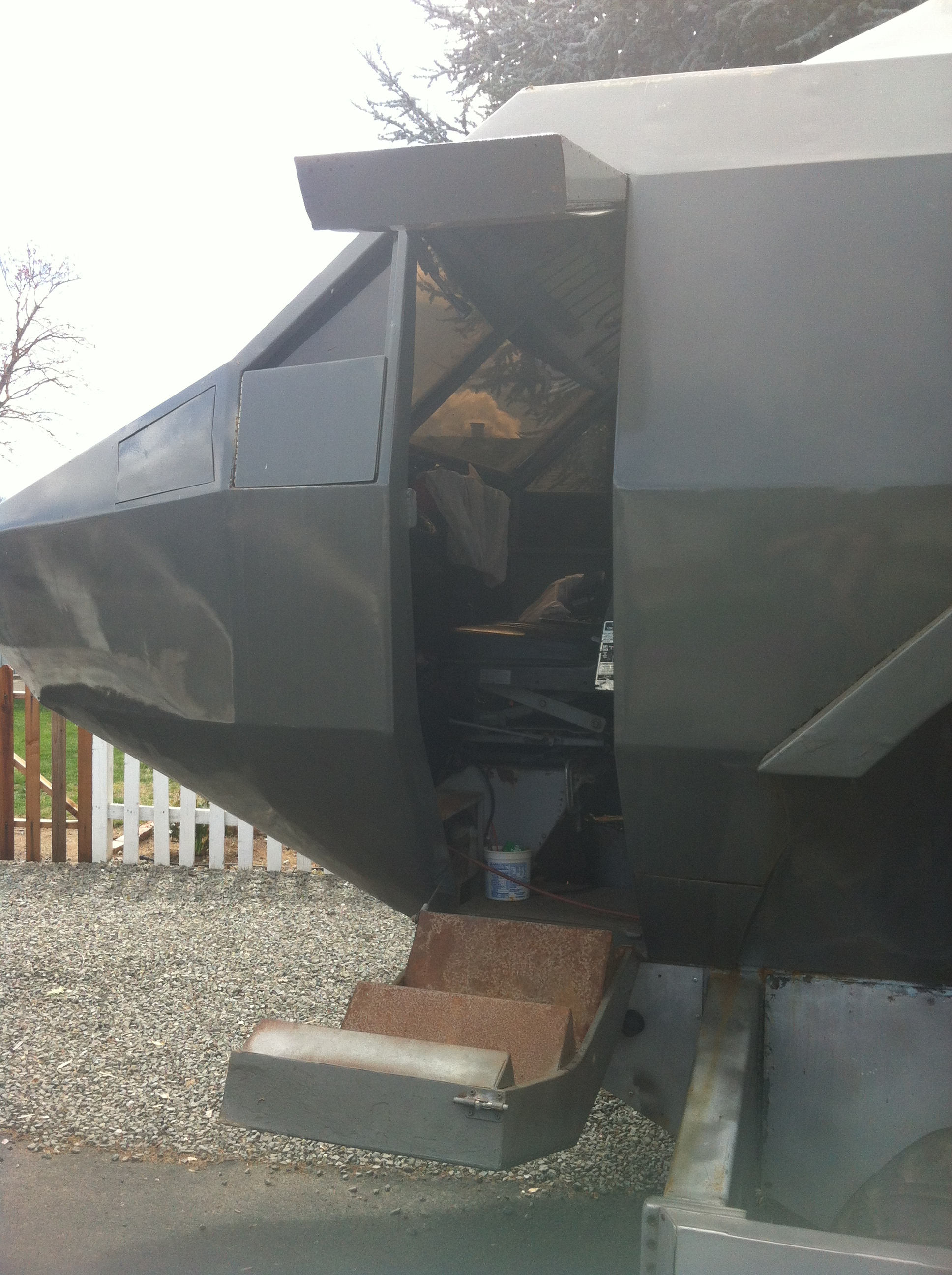
Gantry/entry into cockpit. Raises/lowers via a motor driven cable system.

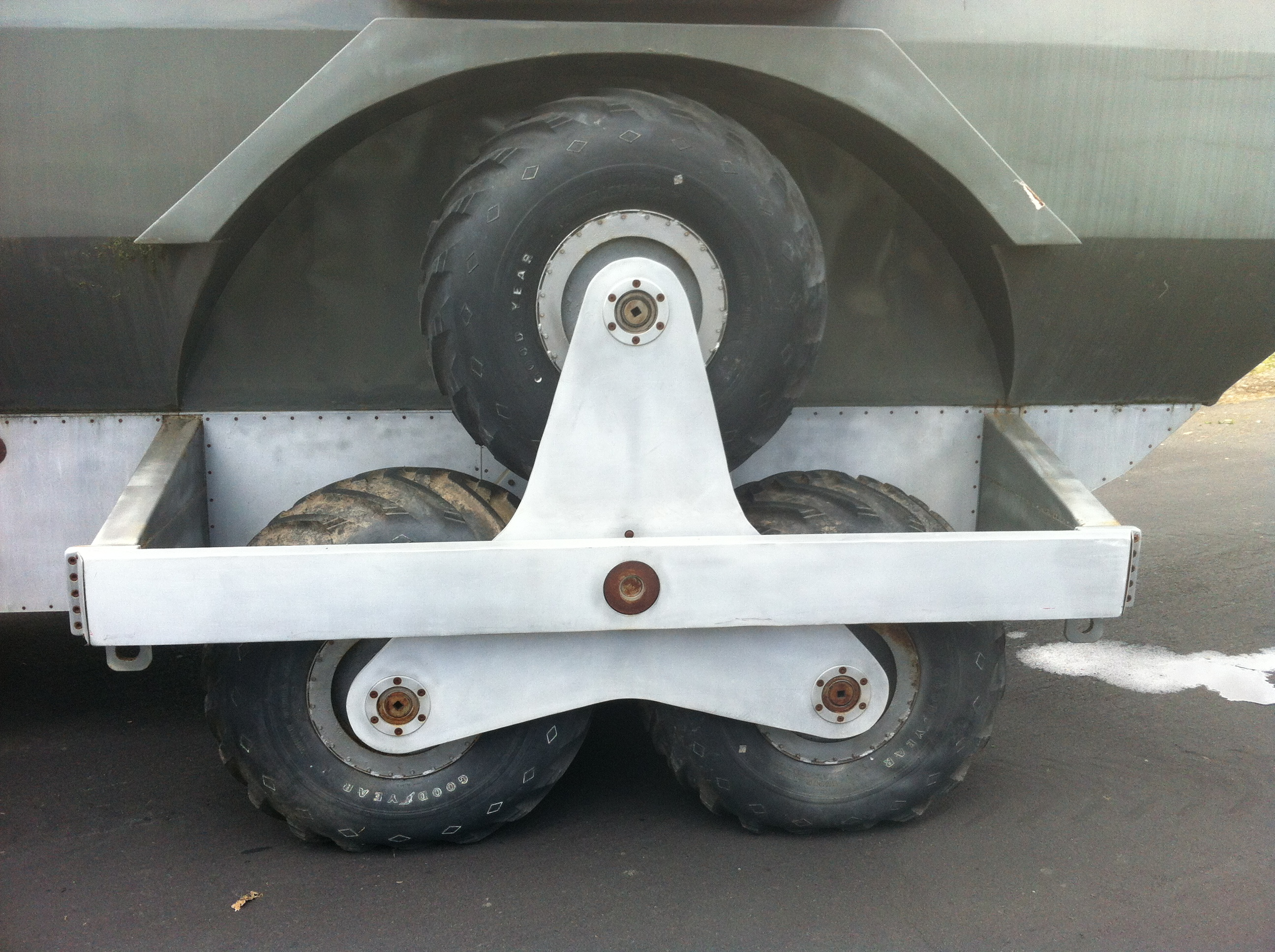
Close-up of trinary wheel system.

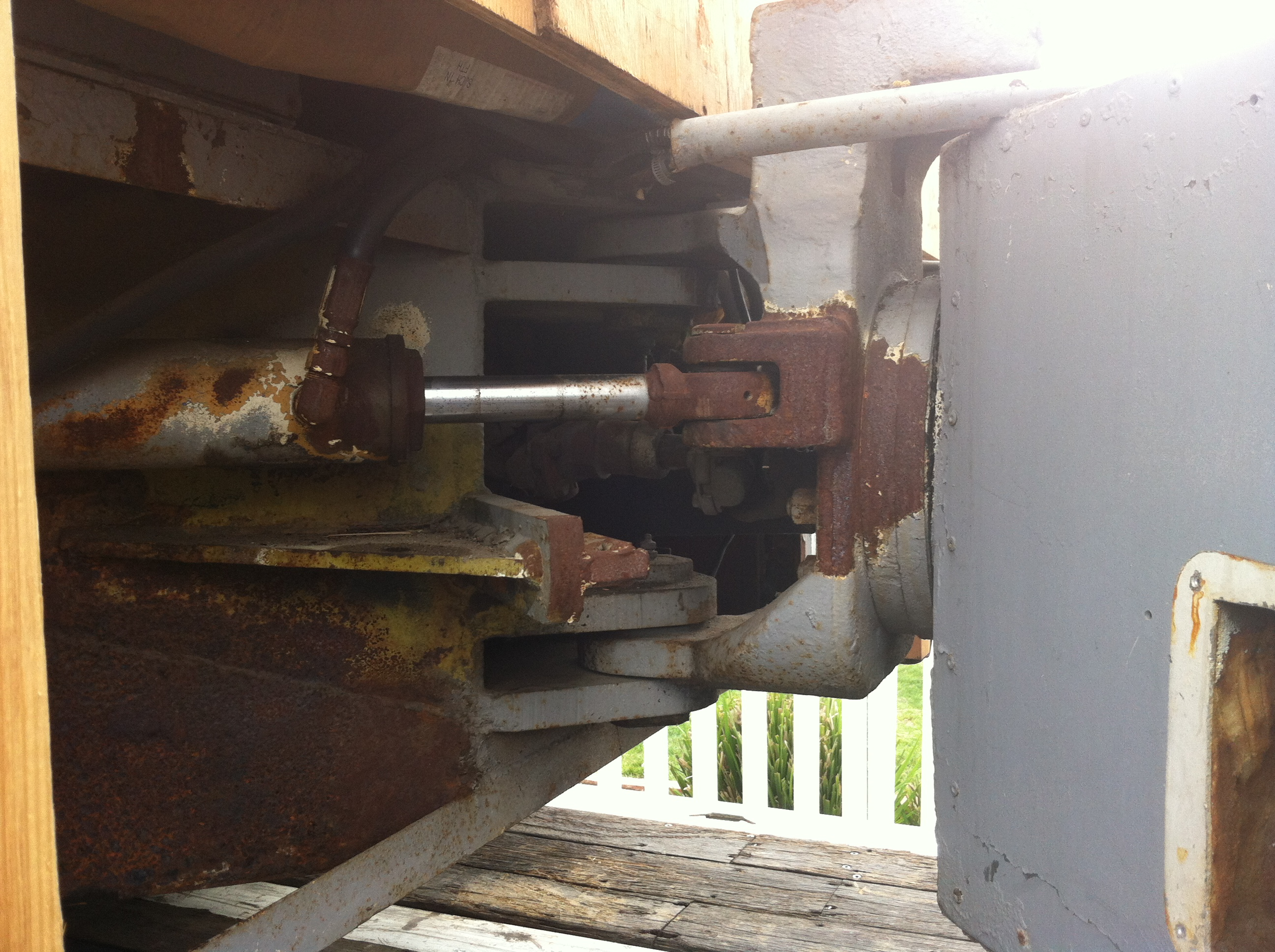
Closeup of section pivot and drive system
Loading and move from Campbell, California to its new facility in central California (March 28, 2014)

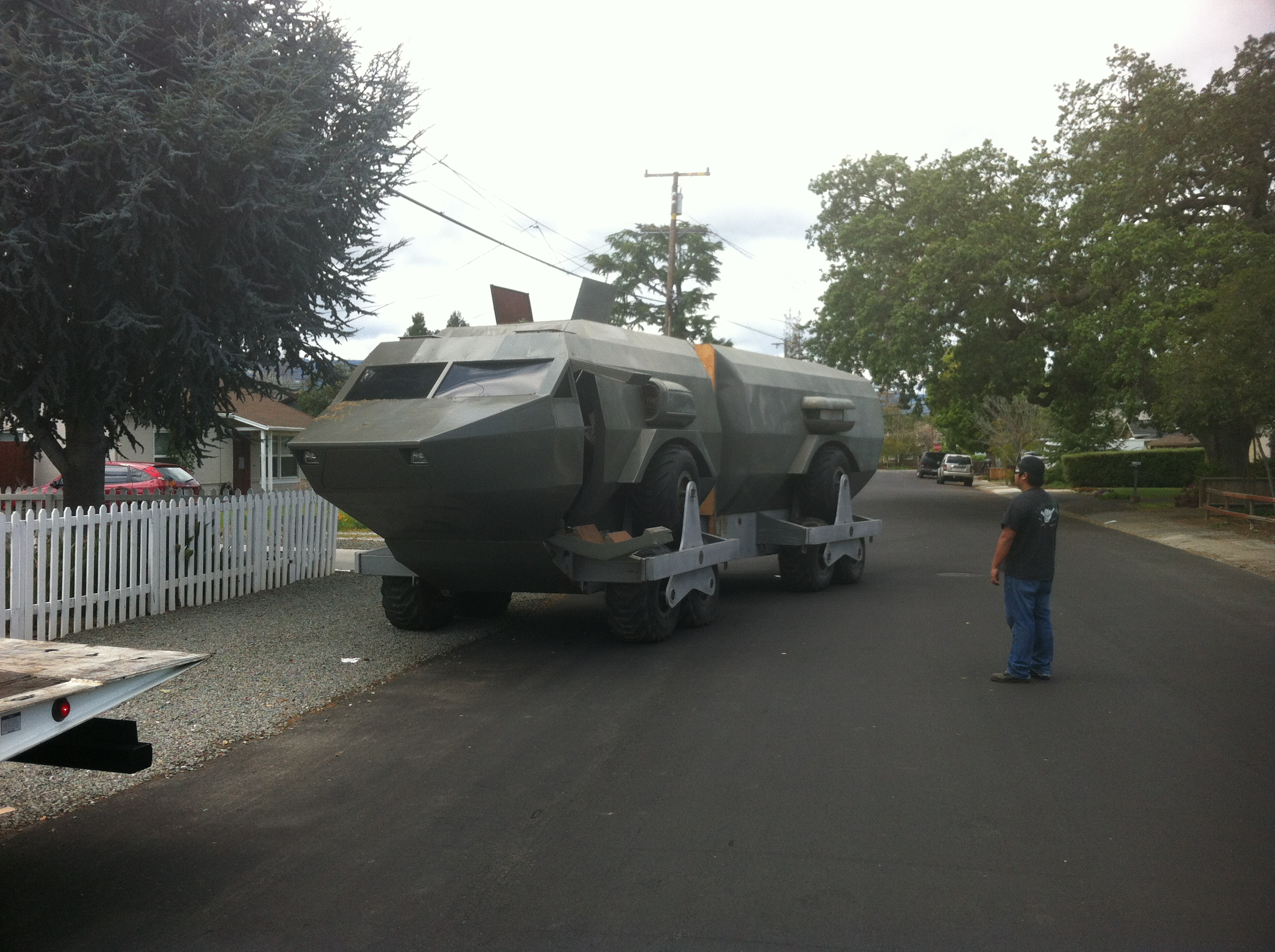
Landmaster was driven under its own power onto trailer shown.

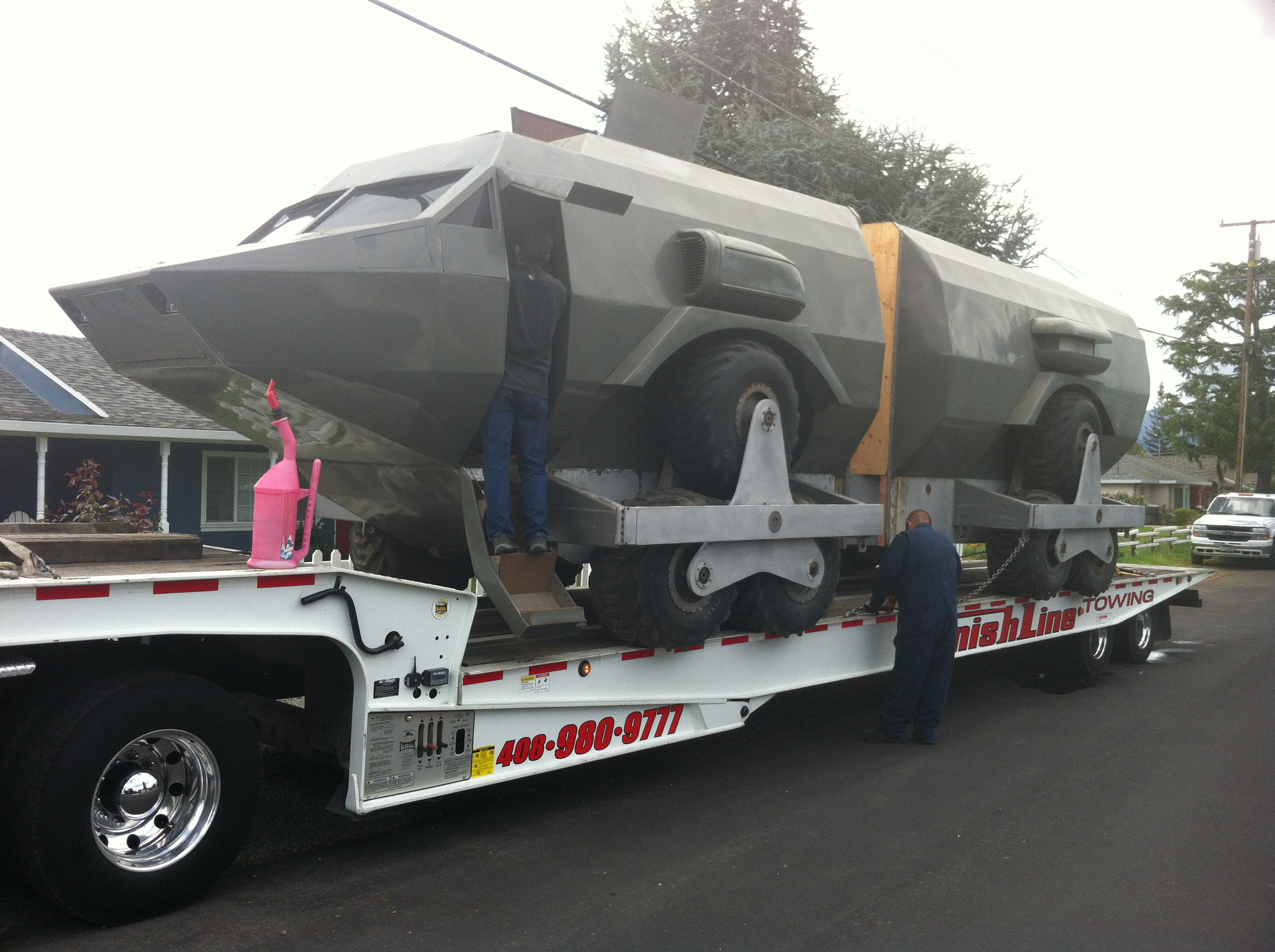
Landmaster just after driving onto trailer

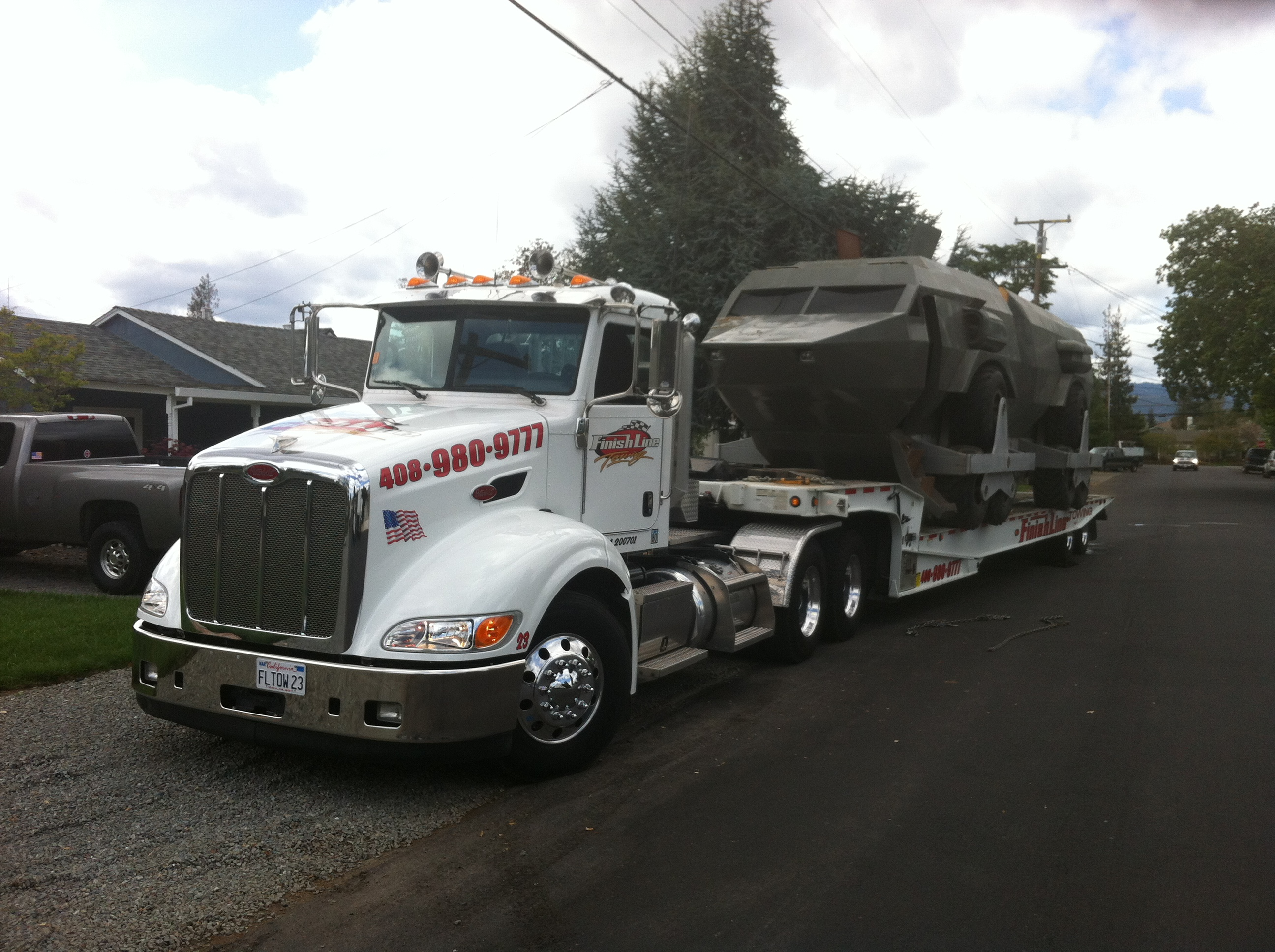
Loaded onto a heavy duty trailer for transport

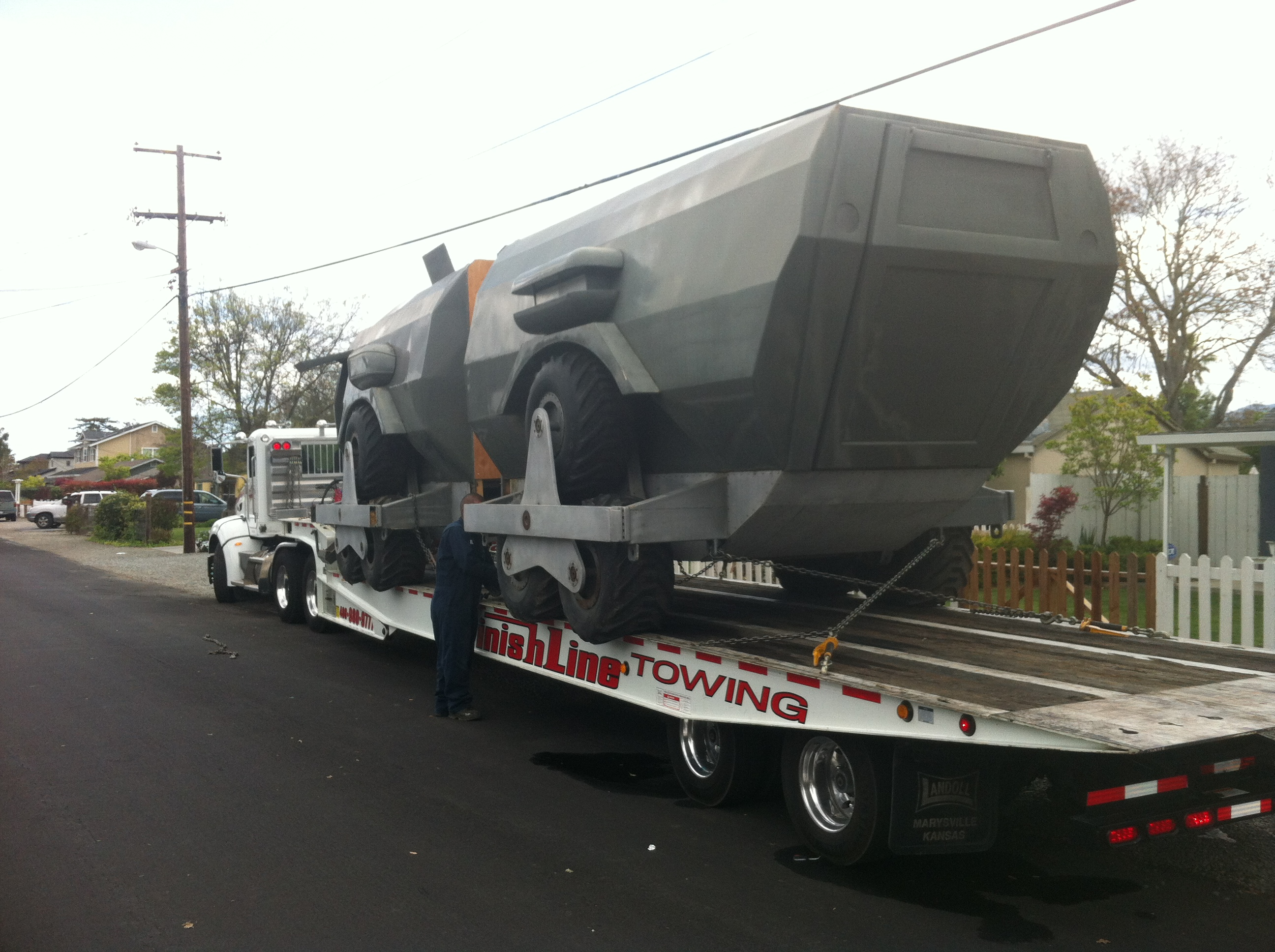
Rear view, loaded onto a heavy duty trailer for transport

== Other appearances ==
- Amoco "the Road Worrier" (1980s) commercial with a Mad Max type character.
- "The Wild and the Young" (1986) music video by Quiet Riot.
- Highway to Heaven: "Merry Christmas From Grandpa" (1989) TV episode.
- The Wizard of Speed and Time (1989) parked on sidewalk about 17 minutes in.
- Get A Life: "Paperboy 2000" (1990) TV episode.
- A.P.E.X. (1994), time travel movie.
- Dino Island (c. 1996), pre-ride video at the Sony MovieGlide Theatre.
- Hybrid (1997), post-apocalyptic movie.
- Battle Angel Alita: Last Order (2001) Manga author paid some respect by creating his own version in chapter 1 and 2.
- Shin Megami Tensei: Strange Journey (2009) video game.

== See also ==
- Ark II – armored vehicle from the eponymous 1976 TV series, which has been confused with the Landmaster.
- Armoured fighting vehicle (AFV) – actual military vehicles related to the Landmaster's film portrayal.
  - Category: wheeled amphibious AFVs – A list of related military vehicles.
- Sandcrawler – contemporary fictional vehicle with similar purpose.
- EM-50 Urban Assault Vehicle - a fictional armored personnel carrier from 1981 American war comedy film Stripes
