= Sam Sing =

Sam Sing or Samsing may refer to:

== Places ==
- Sam Sing Kung Temple (Chinese: 三聖宮; Jyutping: Sam Sing Kung; trans. "Three Saints Temple"), Sandakan, Sabah, Malaysia
- Sam Sing Wan (Chinese: 三星灣; Jyutping: Sam Sing Wan; trans. "Sam Sing Bay"), Hong Kong; a bay at Trio Beach
- Sam-sing Township, Yilan County, Taiwan
- Samsing, Matiali, Malbazar, Jalpaiguri, West Bengal, India; a hill village

== People ==
- Sam Sing, a pageant princess at the Miss Universe Canada 2019

== Other uses ==
- Samsing Group, a Danish resistance group in WWII

== See also ==
- 三星 (disambiguation) (Cantonese romanized as Jyutping: Sam Sing, Sam-sing, Samsing)
- Shyam Singh (disambiguation)
