= Shyam Singh Rana =

Indian politician

Cabinet Minister, Government of Haryana
- Incumbent
- Assumed office 17 October 2024
- Governor: Bandaru Dattatreya
- Chief Minister: Nayab Singh Saini
- Ministry and Departments: Agriculture & Farmers Welfare; Animal Husbandry & Dairying; Fisheries

Member of Haryana Legislative Assembly
- Incumbent
- Assumed office 8 October 2024
- Preceded by: Bishan Lal Saini
- Constituency: Radaur Assembly constituency

Personal details
- Party: Bharatiya Janata Party
- Profession: Politician

Shyam Singh Rana ji is an Indian politician from Haryana. He is a Member of Haryana Legislative Assembly from 2024, representing Radaur Assembly constituency as a Member of the Bharatiya Janata Party.

== See also ==
- 2024 Haryana Legislative Assembly election
- Haryana Legislative Assembly
