= Damnation Alley =

1969 novel by Roger Zelazny

- Cover of the first edition
- Author: Roger Zelazny
- Cover artist: Jack Gaughan
- Language: English
- Genre: Science fiction
- Publisher: G.P. Putnam's Sons
- Publication date: 1969
- Publication place: United States
- Media type: Print (hardback & paperback)
- Pages: 157

Damnation Alley is a 1969 science fiction novel by American writer Roger Zelazny, based on a novella of the same name published in 1967. A film adaptation of the novel was released in 1977.

== Plot introduction ==
The story opens in a post-apocalyptic Southern California, in South Orange County, in a hellish world shattered by nuclear war thirty years before. Several police states have emerged in remaining areas of the former United States that can still support human life. As a result of the war, hurricane-force winds above 500 ft (150 m) prevent any sort of air travel from one state to the next. Sudden, violent, and unpredictable "garbage storms," and giant, mutated animals and insects make day-to-day life treacherous.

"Hell" Tanner, an imprisoned Hells Angels member, is offered a full pardon for his crimes in exchange for taking on a suicide mission: a precarious drive through Damnation Alley, a narrow passage relatively free of lethal radiation, across a ruined America from Orange County, California to Boston, as part of a convoy of three Landmaster vehicles (fitted with various rocket launchers, flamethrowers, machine guns, and slicing implements) attempting to deliver an urgently needed plague vaccine to survivors.

== Reception ==
Barry N. Malzberg found the book "an interesting novella converted to an unfortunate novel," faulting it as "a mechanical, simply transposed action-adventure story written, in my view, at the bottom of the man's talent." Zelazny himself agreed with Malzberg, stating that he preferred the novella and only expanded it at his agent's request, adding that without the novel there would have been no movie deal.

== Film adaptation ==
In 1977, a film loosely based on the novel was directed by Jack Smight. Roger Zelazny liked the original script by Lukas Heller, which was more faithful to his book, and he expected that version to be filmed; he first realized when he saw it in the theater that the shooting script (by Alan Sharp) was significantly different.

== Related works ==
The novel Hardwired by Walter Jon Williams is an homage to Damnation Alley. The two authors (Zelazny and Williams) later became good friends.

Kevin O'Neill has said that the story "The Cursed Earth" in 2000 AD magazine was inspired by Damnation Alley.

Hawkwind's album Quark, Strangeness and Charm contains a song called "Damnation Alley" that's inspired by the story.

The setting and premise of the 2011 Lonesome Road downloadable content (or DLC) for Fallout: New Vegas, a post-apocalyptic action role-playing game, were inspired by Damnation Alley, according to lead designer Chris Avellone. The film adaptation of Zelazny's novel was also one of several sources of inspiration for the original Fallout game, according to designer R. Scott Campbell.
