= Hand truck =

L-shaped box-moving handcart

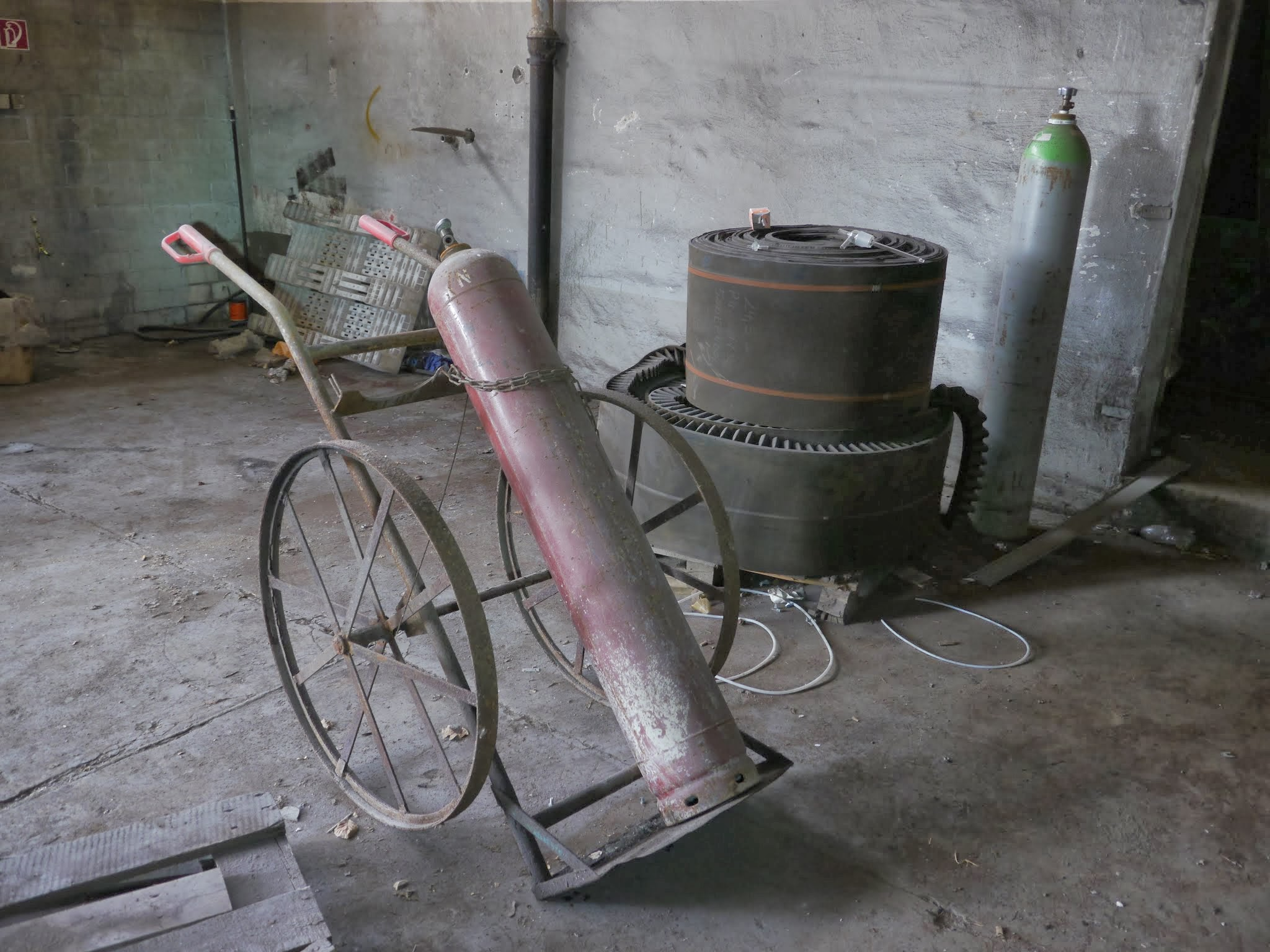
A hand truck used to transport gas cylinders

A hand truck, also known as a hand trolley, dolly, stack truck, trundler, box cart, sack barrow, cart, sack truck, two wheeler, or bag barrow, is an L-shaped box-moving handcart with handles at one end, wheels at the base, with a small ledge to set objects on, flat against the floor when the hand truck is upright. The objects to be moved are tilted forward, the ledge is inserted underneath them, and the objects allowed to tilt back and rest on the ledge. The truck and objects are then tilted backward until the weight is balanced over the wheels, making otherwise bulky and heavy objects easier to move. It is a first-class lever.

== Naming ==
In British English, this device is known as a sack truck or a sack barrow.

== Overview ==
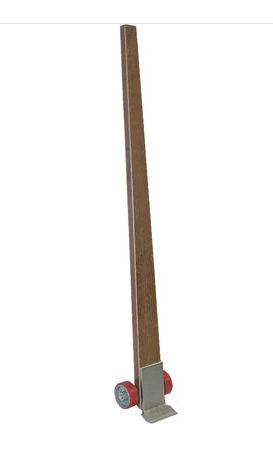
A "pry lever bar" used on docks, in warehouses and around railroad stations during the steam locomotive era

Sack trucks were originally used in the 18th century to move large sacks of spices on docks by young boys, who were unable to lift the large sacks by hand. By using this method they were able to work as well as grown men in moving items around. Later, such trucks were amended for use in many different industries, such as brewing, where hops were moved in sacks, and in relocation, where removal companies manage heavy loads with hand trucks.

Some hand trucks are equipped with stairclimber wheels, which, as the name implies, are designed to go up and down stairs. These stair-climbing hand trucks have three wheels on each side that are always in contact with stairs for added stability. Stairclimber wheels can sometimes be problematic when trying to turn on flat ground as four wheels in a fixed position will be in contact with the ground.

Hand trucks are fabricated from many different types of materials, including steel tube, aluminum tube, aluminum extrusion and high impact plastics. Most commercial hand trucks used for beverage and food service deliveries are rugged and very light. They are usually constructed from two extruded aluminum channel side rails and cast aluminum or magnesium parts.

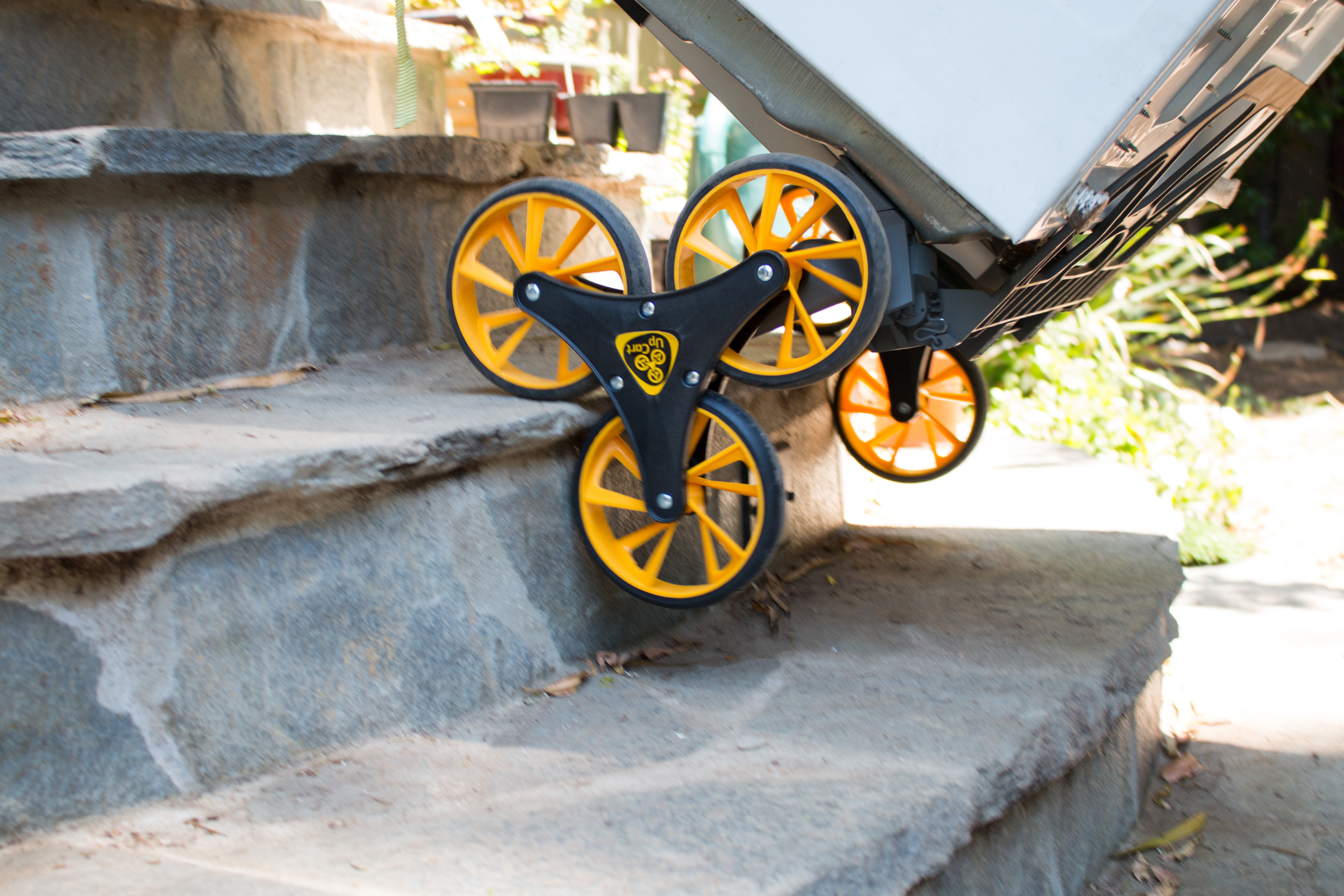
Example of hand truck stair climber wheels

Some of the options that may be considered are the types of wheels, stair climber, handle type and size of wheels.

Other things to be considered should be the load shape compared with the backrest shape, e.g., cylindrical loads should sit on curved backrests, and the environmental conditions in which the hand truck will operate. For example, on loose or uneven ground oversize wheels are a great advantage; solid or puncture-proof foam filled tires may be used where punctures could deflate pneumatic tires.

A rule of thumb is that the toe or nose of the truck should be at least one-third of the length of the load.

Hand trucks are sometimes used as baggage carts by porters in train stations and skycaps at airports.

A piano tilter is a type of hand truck for moving an upright piano without damaging it. Unlike a traditional dolly, which pivots around a smaller wheel or point, the piano tilter has large curved sections to gently tilt an upright piano until it is lying flat on its back.

== See also ==
- Dolly (trailer)
- Electric platform truck
- Flatbed trolley
- Shopping trolley (caddy)
- Toy wagon
- Wheelbarrow
