= AK Plaza =

South Korean retail franchise

AK PLAZA
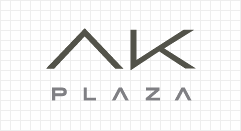
- The official brand image of AK PLAZA
- Native name: AK플라자
- Formerly: Aekyung Department Store (Guro), Samsung Plaza (Bundang)
- Type: Subsidiary
- Industry: Retail
- Founded: Guro District, Seoul, South Korea September 10, 1993
- Founder: Chah, Hyung-suk (채형석)
- Number of locations: 5 stores
- Area served: South Korea
- Key people: Seo, Guang-jun (서광준) (CEO)
- Parent: Aekyung Group (애경그룹)

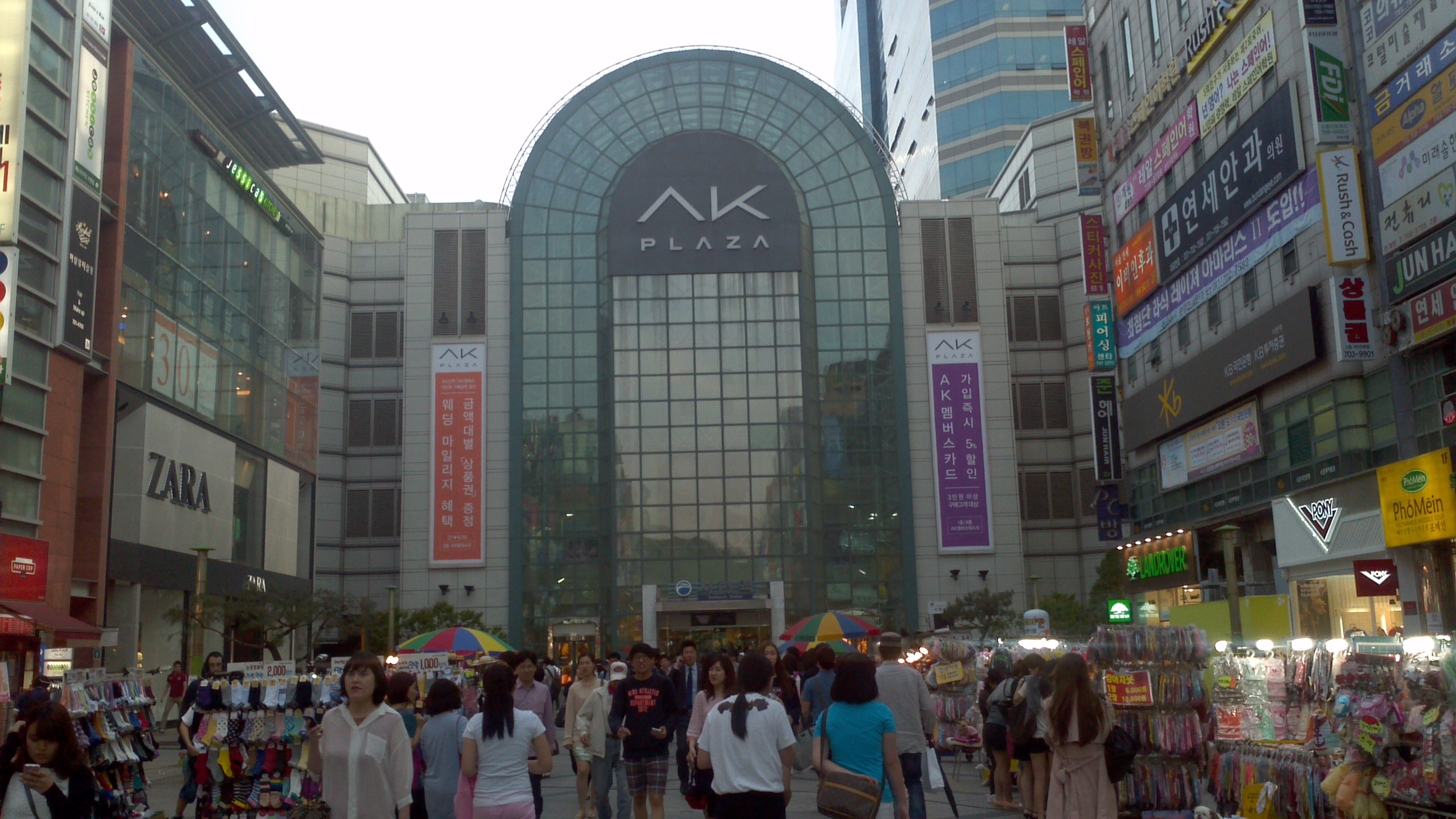
An AK Plaza department store located in Bundang-gu

AK Plaza (Korean: AK플라자) is a South Korean department store franchise owned by the Aekyung Industrial Co. Ltd.

== History ==
Hyung-suk Chah (채형석) began construction of the first department store in March 1991 in Guro District, Seoul. The store opened on September 10, 1993, as the Aekyung Department Store. The store had five basement floors and seven aboveground floors, with a total cost of 120 billion won (120 million US dollars). The success of the Guro store was allegedly used as the basis for opening other branches.

In July 2000, Aekyung Group was chosen to open a store in Incheon International Airport after Hotel Shilla gave up its subcontractor rights. The store was opened on March 29, 2001, as the 'AK Duty Free.' It was the first AK duty-free shop. The Aekyung Group opened an Aekyung Department Store branch in Suwon on February 14, 2003. The store had one basement floor and six aboveground floors. It was the biggest civilian construction in South Korea at that time.

In March 2007, the Aekyung Group took over ₩470 billion's ($461,596,000) worth of intermediary business from Samsung C&T Corporation, including the Samsung Plaza, the first department store in Bundang-gu which had opened on November 1, 1997.

On February 3, 2009, the Aekyung Group announced it will change its brand image to AK Plaza. The logo of Aekyung Department Store, Samsung Plaza, and the online site was changed AK Plaza on March 2.

The Pyeongtaek branch was opened on April 24, 2009, as the fourth store. The Wonju branch was opened on April 6, 2012, with 5 basement stories and 7 above ground stories, though the company website claims it was opened on March 6.

== Stores ==
- Guro Main Store (구로본점), adjacent to Guro Station in Guro-gu, Seoul
- Suwon Store (수원점), sharing a building with Suwon Station in Paldal-gu, Suwon, Gyeonggi-do
- Bundang Store (분당점) (formerly Samsung Plaza), above Seohyeon Station in Bundang-gu, Seongnam, Gyeonggi-do
- Pyeongtaek Store (평택점), adjacent to Pyeongtaek Station in Pyeongtaek, Gyeonggi-do
- Wonju Store (원주점) in Wonju, Gangwon-do
