= 三星 =

The Chinese characters 三星 (lit. 'three stars'), may refer to:

== Companies ==
- Samsung (Korean: 삼성; Hanja: 三星; RR: Samseong), a South Korean multinational manufacturing conglomerate

== Places ==
- Sanxing railway station (Chinese: 三星站; pinyin: Sānxīng zhàn), a station on the Suiyu Railway in Suining, Sichuan, China
- Sanxingdui (Chinese: 三星堆; pinyin: Sānxīngduī; lit. 'three-star mound'), an archeological site in Guanghan, Sichuan, China
- Sanxing, Yilan, Taiwan (Chinese: 三星鄉; pinyin: Sānxīng xiāng), a township in Yilan County
- Sam Sing Wan, Hong Kong (Chinese: 三星灣; trans. "Sam Sing Bay"); a bay located at Trio Beach

== Other uses ==
- Sanxing (deities) (Chinese: 三星; pinyin: Sānxīng; lit. 'Three stars'), three gods in Chinese religion

== See also ==
- Three star (disambiguation)
- Samsung (disambiguation)
- Samseong (disambiguation)
- Sam Sing (disambiguation)
- Sanxing (disambiguation)
