= Damnation Alley (film) =

1977 film by Jack Smight

- Original theatrical release poster
- Directed by: Jack Smight
- Screenplay by: Alan Sharp; Lukas Heller
- Based on: Damnation Alley by Roger Zelazny
- Produced by: Jerome M. Zeitman; Paul Maslansky
- Starring: Jan-Michael Vincent; George Peppard; Dominique Sanda; Paul Winfield; Jackie Earle Haley
- Cinematography: Harry Stradling, Jr.
- Edited by: Frank J. Urioste
- Music by: Jerry Goldsmith
- Distributed by: 20th Century Fox
- Release dates: September 1977 (Japan); October 21, 1977 (United States)
- Running time: 91 minutes
- Country: United States
- Language: English
- Budget: $17 million
- Box office: $8.7 million

Damnation Alley is a 1977 American post-apocalyptic film directed by Jack Smight, loosely based on the 1969 novel of the same name by Roger Zelazny. The original music score was composed by Jerry Goldsmith, and the cinematography was by Harry Stradling Jr. The film starred George Peppard, Jan-Michael Vincent, Dominique Sanda, Paul Winfield and Jackie Earle Haley. Poorly received by critics and audiences, it has since achieved a cult following.

== Plot ==
Major Eugene "Sam" Denton and First Lieutenant Jake Tanner are US Air Force officers assigned to control ICBM missiles at a launch silo in the Mojave Desert. Denton considers Tanner an unsuitable partner and tells him he's requesting his reassignment. Both are familiar with Sergeant Tom Keegan, the security NCO that admits them to the base. During a missile launch drill, the US detects incoming nuclear missiles from the Soviet Union. Tanner and Denton launch their silo's missiles, part of a massive retaliatory strike.

Two years later, the three men have adjusted to the damage wrought by the nuclear exchange of World War III. The Earth's axis has been tilted, massive storms rage over the globe, and the sky is in a perpetual aurora borealis-like state. The two officers have resigned from the military; Tanner is scouting nearby Barstow, California while Keegan has become an artist in one of the ICBM base's out-buildings. Tanner and Keegan defend the area from giant mutated scorpions with high-powered rifles. An accidental fire sparked by a careless airman destroys the barracks and kills the base commander.

Keegan, Tanner, Denton and Lieutenant Tom Perry survive and agree to travel to Albany, New York, to investigate a lone radio transmission that has aired weekly since the war. Embarked on two 12-wheel Landmaster armored personnel carriers, they must cross Damnation Alley, "the path of least resistance" between intense radiation areas. Perry is killed in a storm which disables one of the Landmasters. Mutated cockroaches in the ruins of Salt Lake City trap and eat Keegan alive. Denton and Tanner pick up two survivors, Janice and Billy, and fight gun-toting mountain men in an abandoned gas station in the Midwest, destroying the buildings with the Landmaster's rocket launchers.

Drivetrain trouble near Detroit forces them into a wrecking yard to search for replacement parts, but a hemisphere-wide storm breaks, and a megatsunami washes the Landmaster and passengers away, leaving them adrift in a large body of water under a suddenly clear sky, suggesting the Earth returned to its normal axis. Making landfall in the amphibious Landmaster, they hear a musical radio broadcast. Denton makes radio contact while Tanner and Billy ride a dirt bike to locate the source of the broadcast. They reach a surprisingly intact suburb of Albany, where they are greeted by its inhabitants.

== Cast ==
- Jan-Michael Vincent as 1st Lt. Jake Tanner
- George Peppard as Major Eugene "Sam" Denton
- Dominique Sanda as Janice
- Paul Winfield as Keegan
- Jackie Earle Haley as Billy
- Kip Niven as Lt. Tom Perry
- Mark L. Taylor as Haskins
- Robert Donner as Mountain Man
- Murray Hamilton (uncredited) as General Landers

== Production ==
=== Development ===
Roger Zelazny's original story of Damnation Alley was changed considerably for the final shooting script of the film. Initially, Zelazny was quite pleased with the first draft by Lukas Heller, written in June, 1975, and expected it to be the shooting script. However, when the project was presented to several directors (including Robert Wise) and special effects teams (including Douglas Trumbull and Linwood Dunn), it was considered impossible to film due to the amount of effects work called for in the script, requiring filming technologies that did not exist at the time. The studio then brought in Alan Sharp to write a revised version to minimize this issue, which left out many of the elements of the original script and Zelazny's book. Zelazny did not realize this until he saw the film in the theater.

With the revised script, and budgeted at US$7.2 million, Damnation Alley was helmed by veteran director Jack Smight, who had scored two consecutive box office hits in the previous two years (Airport 1975 and Midway).

=== Filming ===
Filming began on June 21, 1976, east of the town of Borrego Springs, California, where a missile base set was constructed, as well as locations in Meteor Crater, Arizona, Valley of Fire State Park in Nevada, Salt Lake City, Utah, and the Mojave Desert in California. The lake scenes were filmed at Flathead Lake in Kalispell, Montana. Filming wrapped on August 13, 1976, at 20th Century Fox Studios in Los Angeles, for all the interior scenes.

Production was rife with problems from the outset — the first scenes to be filmed were those at the desert missile base set near Borrego Springs, California, where the devastated landscapes and giant mutated insects proved to be very difficult to create in a convincing way, despite the large budget. The sequence involving giant 8-foot-long (2.4 m) scorpions attacking a motorcycle was attempted using full-scale scorpion props, but they did not work well, and the resulting footage was unacceptable. The solution was to use actual scorpions composited onto live action footage using the blue screen process in post-production. After the production moved to Flagstaff, Arizona, Jan-Michael Vincent became drunk, and insulted the local Native American residents, who in turn "befriended" him and gave him peyote, which caused a three-day delay in filming when Vincent became intoxicated, and could not be found. The action sequence with giant cockroaches used a combination of live Madagascar hissing cockroaches and large numbers of rubber bugs which looked unconvincing onscreen, as the strings pulling mats covered in fake insects were plainly visible. To complicate matters, according to director Jack Smight in his memoir, studio chief Alan Ladd, Jr. redirected about a quarter of Damnation Alley's total production budget as completion funds for George Lucas' lower-budgeted film, Star Wars. Smight was not made aware of the budget reduction on Damnation Alley until he neared its completion, which compromised most of the remaining special effects work, for which there was now very little money left.

=== Post-production ===
The original director's cut of the film delivered to the studio by Jack Smight in late-1976 ran 2 hours and 15 minutes. Even though the special effects work was not completed at that time, the studio made minor changes to the cut, and awaited the completion of the special effects work prior to releasing it. While the effects were underway, the completion funds were diverted to Star Wars, which was having budget and production issues, which eliminated several important effects scenes which had not yet been created, including the Minuteman III missile launch sequences, the base explosion, and importantly, the storm and tsunami in the last act. Because these scenes were cut, Fox relied on stock footage from other films (and public domain footage of missile launches and nuclear explosions) for those particular shots.

Because of this, and the last-minute decision to add "radioactive skies" in special effects, Damnation Alley was in post-production well past the intended release date of December, 1976 due to the difficult process of superimposing optical effects on the sky in about 300 shots (which were not part of the original concept, and consequently, were not planned for during filming, resulting in poor execution of the effect). This pushed the release date from December, 1976 to March, 1977, and then again to June, 1977. It was during this delay that 20th Century Fox released their "other" science fiction film for 1977, Star Wars. The studio had planned to release only two science fiction films that year, with Damnation Alley intended to be the blockbuster.

Star Wars became a hit of epic proportions, and forced Fox to further delay and re-address a struggling Damnation Alley, which was still languishing in post-production special effects work. In a panic, the release date was delayed to December, 1977, only to be moved up to October when the studio realized it would go up against the release of an expected hit, Steven Spielberg's Close Encounters of the Third Kind. With the additional delay, Fox re-edited the entire film. Smight was already involved with another project during this time, so Fox took over the re-edit. The decision was made to cut down the length of the film to the bare-minimum running time of 90 minutes for a theatrical release, and large sections of the film were edited out by the studio. These cuts amounted to 44 minutes of footage, and included a major subplot of a love triangle between Tanner, Denton, and Janice. Many scenes early in the film at the missile base were excised as well - sequences which showed the breakdown of military order. Murray Hamilton was featured prominently in several scenes which were cut, as the now-despondent and alcoholic General in charge of the base (which rendered his character literally "mute" in the final film, with no lines of dialogue). Critically, a physical confrontation between Tanner and Denton after the death of Keegan by "killer cockroaches" was removed (in this scene, Tanner blames Denton for not saving his friend from death, and subsequently attempts to kill him). In spite of these major edits, Fox focused more content on the "Landmaster" vehicle, and the special effects, in direct response to Star Wars. The film underwent several name changes during this period, from the original "Damnation Alley" to "Salvation Road," and then to "Survival Run" up until shortly before the release, when it was again renamed "Damnation Alley".

In a break from Hollywood tradition, the film was released in Japan first on September 10, 1977. Enjoying a successful release there, it was then released in the United States on October 21, 1977 to fleeting success when it opened, but poor critical reviews and word of mouth tanked it at the box office.

=== Landmaster ===
A notable aspect of the film was the Landmaster vehicle, which features a hinged center section, and a unique rotating 12-wheel assembly. The Landmaster was custom-built for the film at $350,000 in 1976 by automotive customizer Dean Jeffries ($1.98 million in 2025).

The Landmaster was sold to a private owner in 2005 and was restored to a modified condition, somewhat different than featured in the film. The Landmaster was then on the show car circuit for several years. In 2007 it was featured at the San Francisco Rod & Custom Show at the Cow Palace in San Francisco, California as part of a special exhibit with other notable movie and TV cars.

From 2015 to 2024, the Landmaster was owned by Gene Winfield, also a car customizer. For a time, it was parked at his shop, and could be seen from the highway.

After Winfield's passing, his estate sold the Landmaster in 2024 to an unknown buyer in California, who is restoring the vehicle to filming condition.

=== Sound 360 ===
A few big-city premiere engagements of Damnation Alley were presented in Sound 360, a surround-sound process.

Jerry Goldsmith's score made good use of the wide stereo separation afforded by Sound 360, particularly in the opening theme, with fanfares emanating from each side of the theater in turn.

== Reception ==
In what was a departure from typical motion picture studio practice at the time, Damnation Alley opened in September, 1977 in Japan, one month prior to its release in the United States and more than a year after it was filmed. It grossed $1,250,956 in its first 9 days from 64 theaters. After its US release, it quickly left the theaters because it did not make enough to stay in the chain theaters, duplexes or triplexes. Dismissal of the film was noted, overshadowed by prior apocalypse-themed films like Day the World Ended and On the Beach. In some theaters during 1977, the film was paired with another film, Ralph Bakshi's fantasy Wizards, which was financially successful.

In the UK, Damnation Alley was released in January 1979 as a double bill with Thunder and Lightning, another 20th Century Fox film from 1977.

On the review aggregator website Rotten Tomatoes, 42% of 12 critics' reviews are positive, with an average rating of 4.4/10. Metacritic, which uses a weighted average, assigned the film a score of 30 out of 100, based on 7 critics, indicating "generally unfavorable" reviews.

=== Home media ===
The network TV premiere on NBC television on Sunday, June 12, 1983, featured alternate and additional scenes re-inserted (notably, footage of Murray Hamilton and George Peppard, where Denton asks for permission to leave the missile base, as well as additional scenes with Dominique Sanda and Peppard, where Denton tells Janice about his wife who died in the nuclear war). The network premiere was a ratings success, finishing second in the Nielsen Ratings for the week.

Damnation Alley was released on VHS, Betamax, and Video 2000 formats in the United Kingdom in 1983, and on VHS and Betamax in the United States in 1985. Shout! Factory released the film (on DVD and Blu-ray) on July 12, 2011, in the United States. This release features a new anamorphic widescreen transfer, and audio commentary with producer Paul Maslansky, as well as extras including featurettes detailing the challenges in making the film, and a detailed examination of the now-famous Landmaster vehicle with designer and builder Dean Jeffries. The original "Sound 360" audio mix is not featured on the DVD and Blu-ray, as the original elements were too damaged to salvage. The film was also released on DVD in the United Kingdom in 2011.
