= Dong District, Daejeon =

Coordinates: 36.33°N 127.43°E

Dong
- Autonomous District
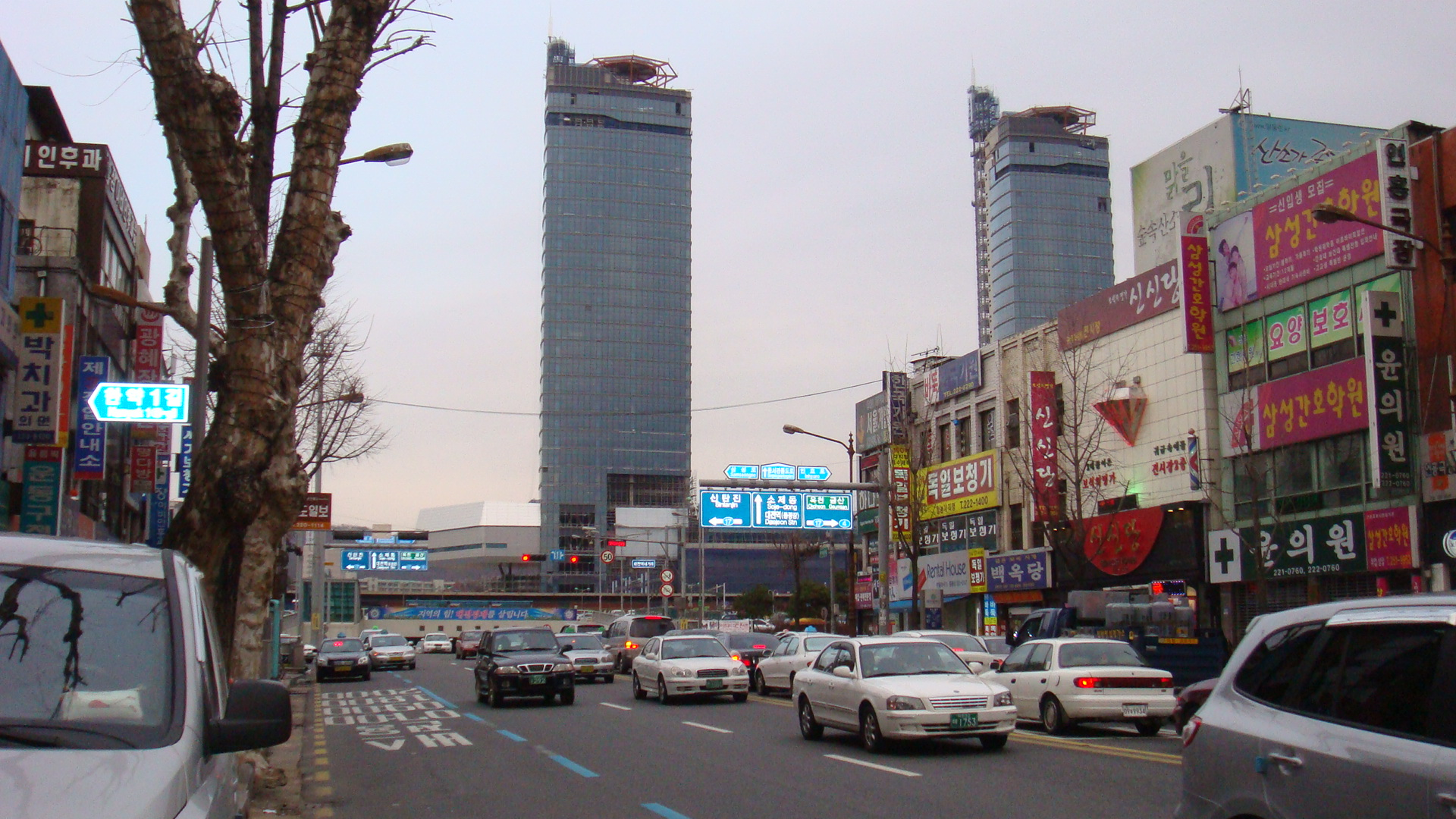

- Flag

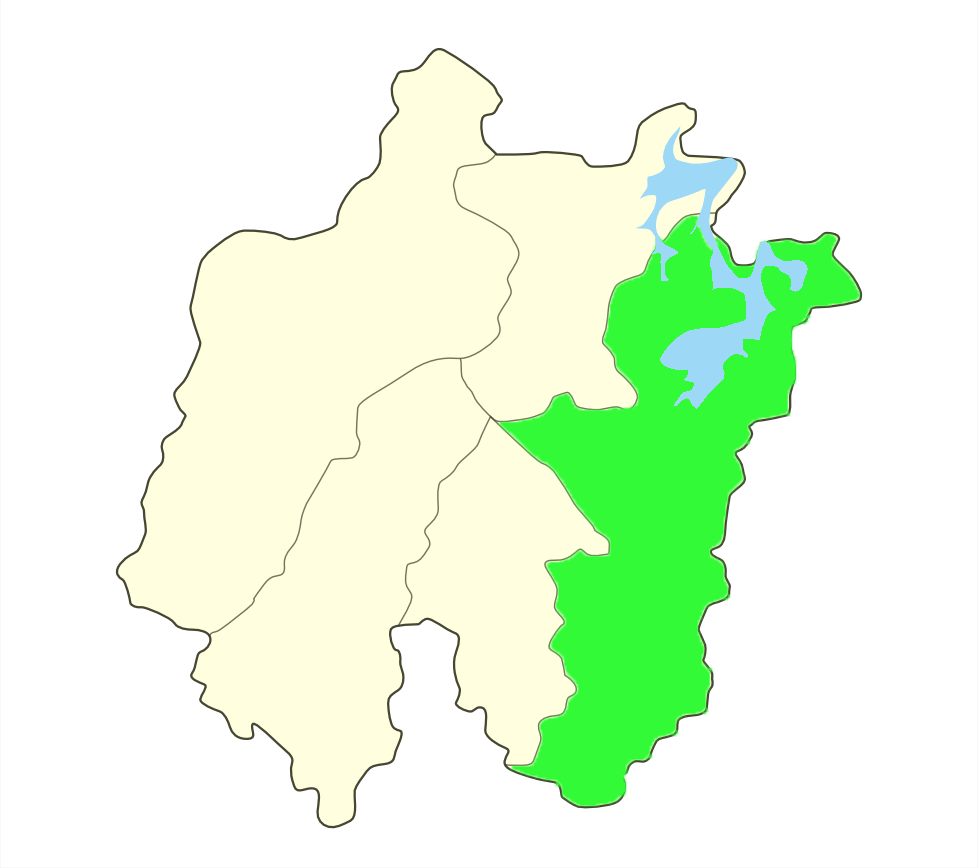
- Country: South Korea
- Region: Hoseo
- Provincial level: Daejeon
- Administrative divisions: 16 administrative dong

Government
  - Mayor: Hwang In-ho (황인호)

Area
  - Total: 136.61 km^{2} (52.75 sq mi)

Population (2024)
  - Total: 218,640
  - Density: 1,600.5/km^{2} (4,145.2/sq mi)
  - Dialect: Chungcheong
- Website: Dong District Office

Korean name
- Hangul: 동구
- Hanja: 東區
- RR: Dong-gu
- MR: Tong-gu

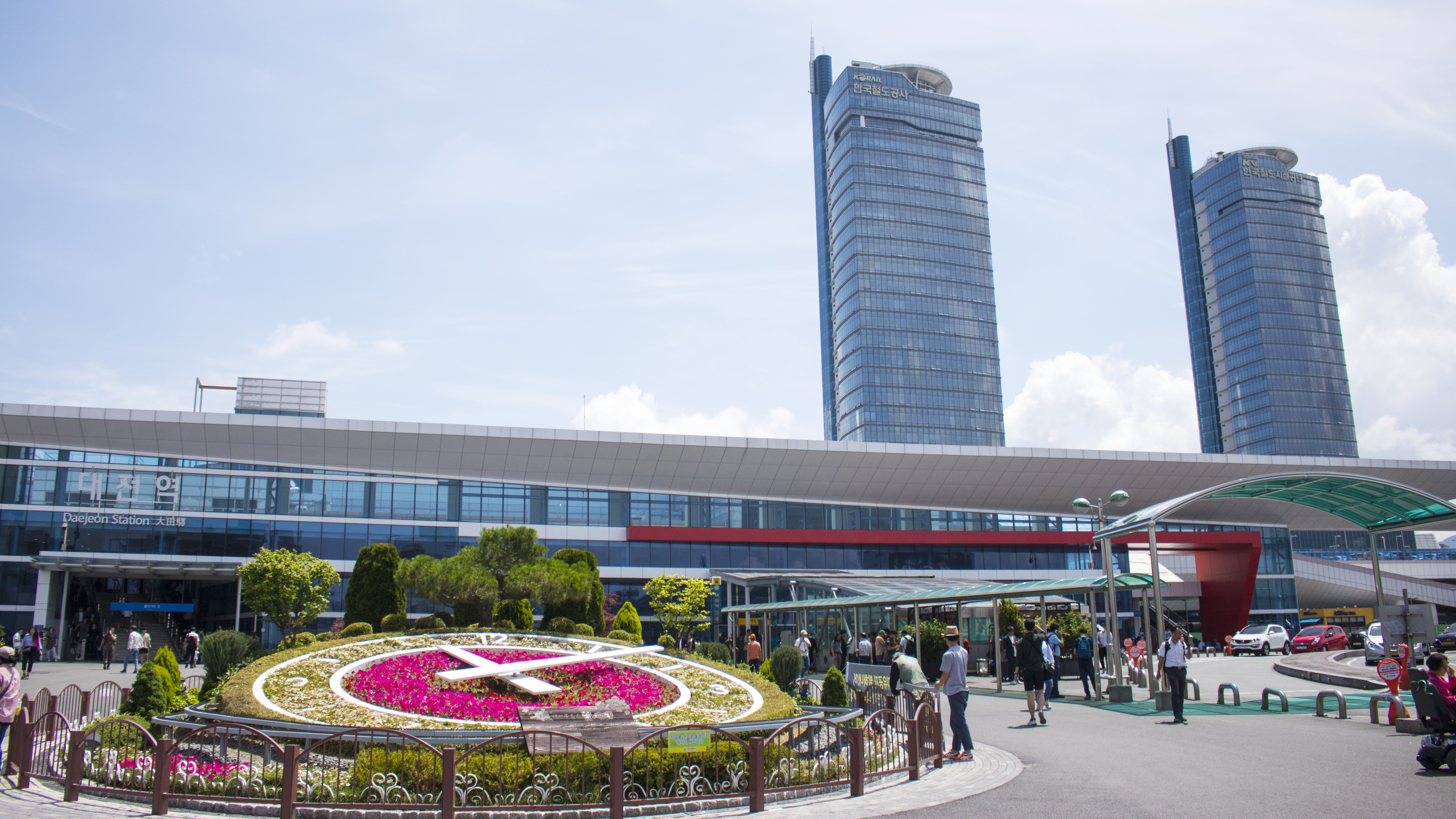
Daejeon Station

Dong District (Korean: 동구) is a district in Daejeon, South Korea. Dong-gu consists of a total of 16 dongs, including Yongun-dong, Hyo-dong, and Sannae-dong.

To the east, the district borders Okcheon, Daedeok District, and Jung District. To the south, it borders Geumsan, South Chungcheong Province, and to the north, it borders Cheongwon and northern Okcheon.

== History ==
Since many relics from the Paleolithic and Neolithic Ages have been discovered in the surrounding areas of Dong District, such as Gujeok-dong, Dunsan-dong, and Guseong-dong, it is assumed that people lived in the district area before the Bronze Age.

During the Three Kingdoms Period, the area belonged to Baekje's Usul-gun (우술군; 雨述郡), during the Unified Silla Period, to Bipung-gun (비풍군; 比豊郡), and during the Goryeo Period, it belonged to Hoedeok-gun (회덕군) and Jinjam-hyeon (진잠현), which were part of Gongju-mok (공주목). During the Joseon Dynasty, most of the area, except for the area near Sannae under the jurisdiction of Gongju-mok and the area near Secheon under the jurisdiction of Cheongmu-mok (청무목), came under the jurisdiction of Hoedeok-hyeon due to the reorganization of the local government system in 1413.

In the 1940s and 1950s, Daejeon began to develop with the city center formed around the Daejeoncheon River and Daejeon Station. It developed into a commercial city and a transportation city by taking advantage of its location as a transportation hub, and the Dong District area emerged as an important area of the city.

== Economy ==
Dong District (Dong-gu) is often regarded as the most underdeveloped area in Daejeon. However, it wasn't always this way—Dong-gu once served as the central hub of the city. Its decline began in the 1990s, when the western areas of Daejeon, such as Seo-gu and Yuseong-gu, underwent significant development. The construction of the Dunsan New Town, along with the relocation of the Daejeon Government Complex and other key government offices, public institutions, businesses, and shops to this area, led to the gradual decline of Dong-gu, which had previously been the city's original downtown.

== Geography ==
Dong District has a topography of high east-low west. To the west of the district, Daejeoncheon forms the border with thebarea, and Daedongcheon, which flows through the central and northern regions, flows into Daejeoncheon. The geology of this district is mostly a deeply weathered granite distribution area. Farmland is decreasing every year due to the increase in industrial facilities, and the cultivated area is about 9.2% of the total area of the district.

In summer, it is hot and humid due to the influence of the air current blowing from the North Pacific Ocean, and in winter, it is cold and dry due to the influence of the air current blowing from the Siberia. Summer precipitation accounts for 55% of the total annual precipitation, and winter precipitation is very low.

== Tourism ==
=== Sikjangsan ===
Sikjangsan Mountain (Korean: 식장산) is 596.7m above sea level and has an 11.2 km walking trail. There are traditional temples such as Gujeolsa Temple and Gosansa Temple. The city designated Secheon Park, which contains many ruins of Sikjangsan Mountain, as a natural habitat conservation forest.

=== Daecheongho Lake ===
Daecheongho Lake (Korean: 대청호) is an artificial lake created by damming the Geumgang with Daecheong Dam and is the third largest lake in South Korea. In particular, there are migratory birds and egrets due to the clean natural environment. Daecheong Lake's Hoeinseon Cherry Blossom Road is a 26.6 km long cherry blossom road. It is one of the beautiful cherry blossom roads selected by the Korea National Arboretum.

=== Jungang Market ===
Daejeon Jungang Market (Korean: 대전 중앙시장), located near Daejeon Station, was the largest traditional market in the central region. There are themed streets within the market, examples of which include Bookstore Street, Fish Market Street, Tableware Wholesale Street, Accessory Street, Home Interior Street, and Food Street.

== Gallery ==
Jungang Market in 2023

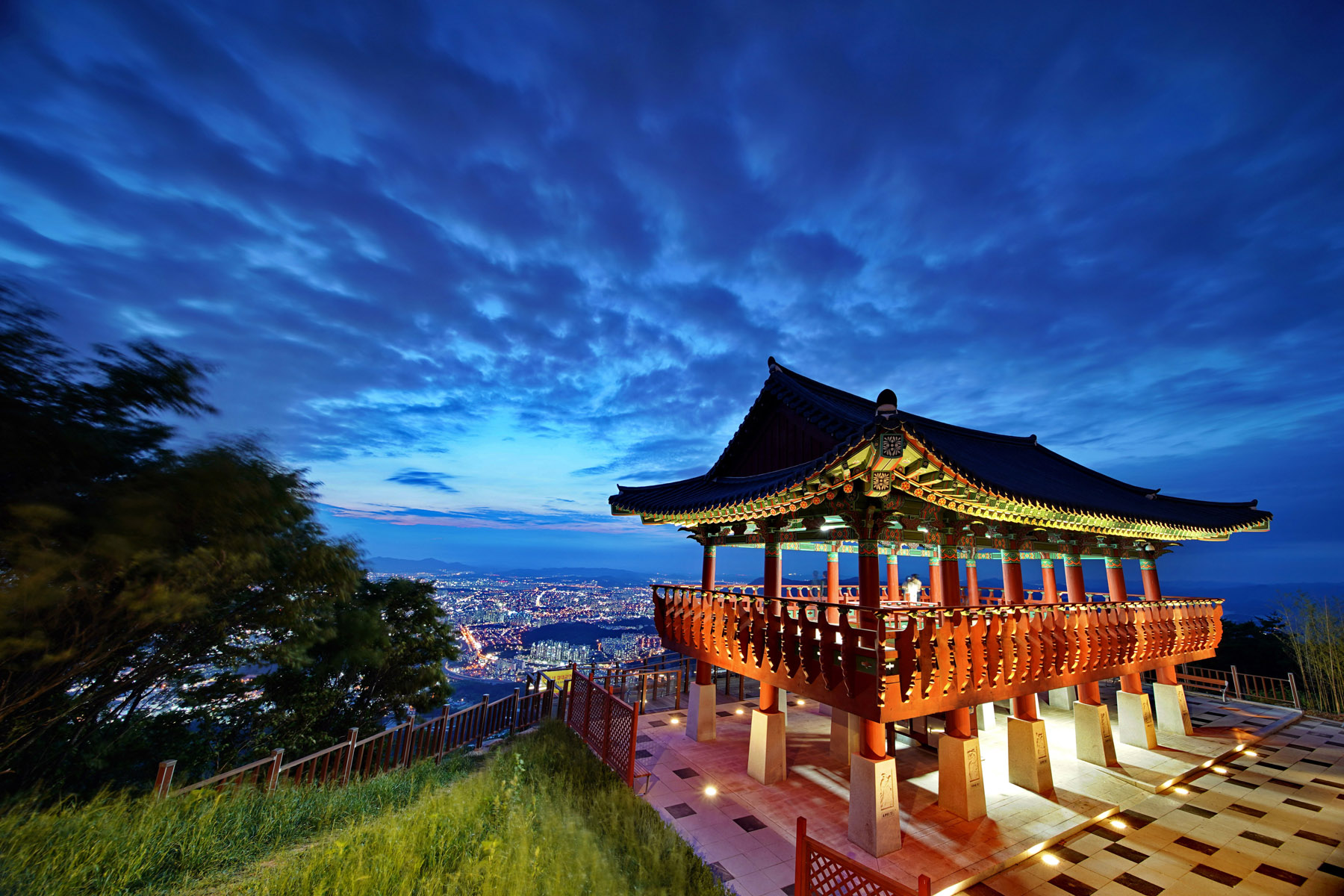
Night view of Sikjangsan Observatory

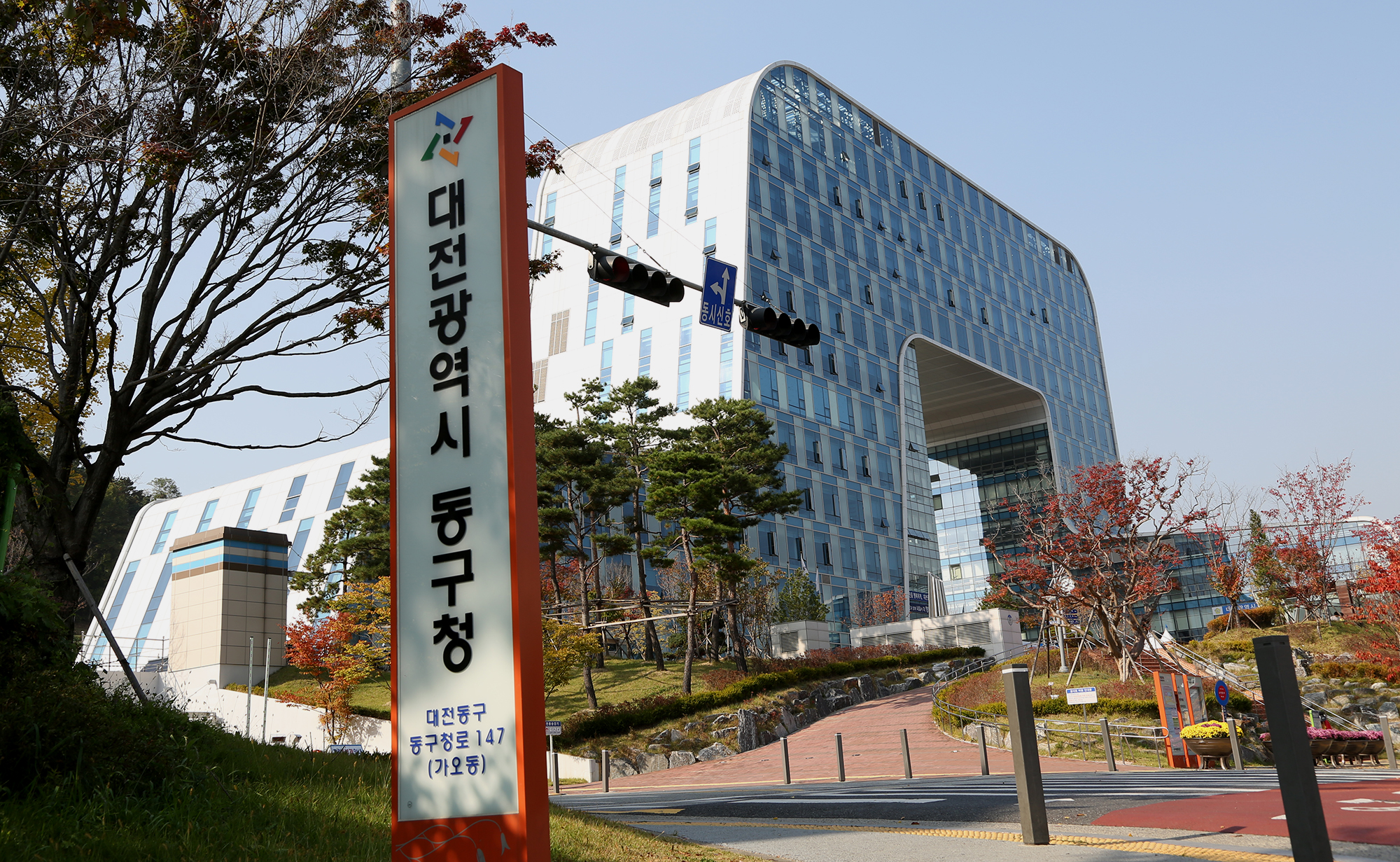
District office

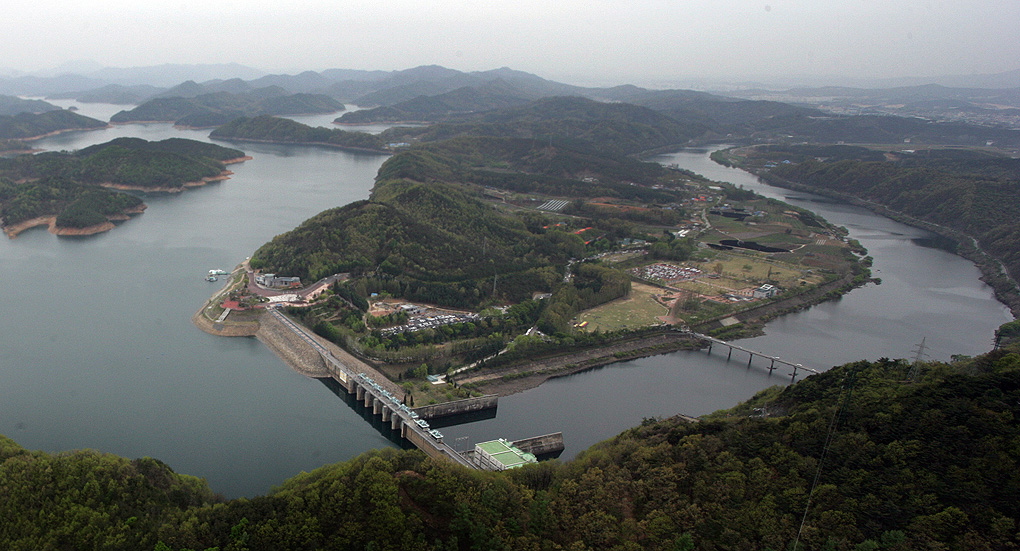
Daecheong Dam

== Transportation ==
- Daejeon Station

== See also ==
- Samseong-dong
