= Tristar Worldwide =

- Founded: 1978
- Defunct: September 2020
- Fate: Merged into Addison Lee
- Successor: Addison Lee
- Headquarters: Horton Road, West Drayton, London Borough of Hillingdon, England
- Number of locations: Boston, Hong Kong, Paris
- Area served: Worldwide
- Services: Luxury Car Hire with Chauffeur
- Number of employees: 650
- Website: TristarWorldwide.com

Tristar Worldwide was a chauffeur-driven private hire car provider. The UK-based company operates in around 80 countries with an annual turnover of £48m and 650 employees. It was founded in 1978, originally for use by business class passengers of Virgin Atlantic. Tristar operates a fleet of 415 Volvo and Mercedes-Benz cars.

In 2008, Dean De Beer led a management buyout, which left him as the owner of the company.

In 2012, Tristar acquired M7 Worldwide Transportation, a US company operating in the same premium market. This significantly expanded their presence in the US.

In June 2016, Tristar was acquired by Addison Lee and in September 2020, during the COVID pandemic, the company and fleet was merged into the Addison Lee operation discontinuing the Tristar brand.

== Fleet of vehicles ==
As of April 2015, Tristar had a fleet of 415 vehicles. In 2013, they acquired their first hybrid cars: three Volvo V60 Plug-in Hybrid diesels for an eight-month trial to assess whether they would reduce fuel consumption, CO_{2} emissions, maintenance costs and company car tax.

Until 2014, they divided their purchases between Mercedes-Benz and Volvo. In 2015 the company changed its purchasing policy, commencing the transition to a fleet of 450 Mercedes-Benz cars exclusively. These will include Mercedes-Benz V-Class extra long vehicles which provide seating for up to eight passengers.

=== Safety initiatives ===
Tristar has piloted a number of safety improvements for their fleet. In 2005, they were the first fleet operator in England to trial "DriveCam" devices which would automatically capture 20 seconds of video before and after an accident. In late 2013, the introduction of forward-facing continuously recording video cameras, combined with GPS data to record the vehicles' speed, reduced accidents and also saved money on insurance premiums and disputed claims. In 2014, their close association with Volvo gave them early access to Autonomous Emergency Braking (AEB) technology for a six-month trial, which was reported to reduce rear impact collisions by 28 per cent. In 2015, in conjunction with the change to Mercedes-Benz exclusively, they adopted "Collision Prevention Assistance Plus", which warns the driver if they start to drift out of their lane or approach too close to the vehicle ahead, and can brake automatically if the driver fails to respond.

== Awards ==
The company was awarded the United Kingdom’s Queen’s Award for Enterprise in International Trade for 2012. In 2013, it received two awards from the Royal Society for the Prevention of Accidents (RoSPA): a Gold Award for Management of Occupational Road Risk (MORR) and a Silver Award for Occupational Health and Safety. In 2014, it won the RoSPA's MORR Technology Trophy for “the best use of technology in managing work-related road risk across all industries", and the "Eco Fleet" award at the 2014 Brake Fleet Safety Awards, as well as being highly commended for the "Company Driver Safety" and "Road Risk Manager of the Year" awards.
