= AK Plaza, Bundang =

Shopping mall in Seongnam, South Korea

AK Plaza
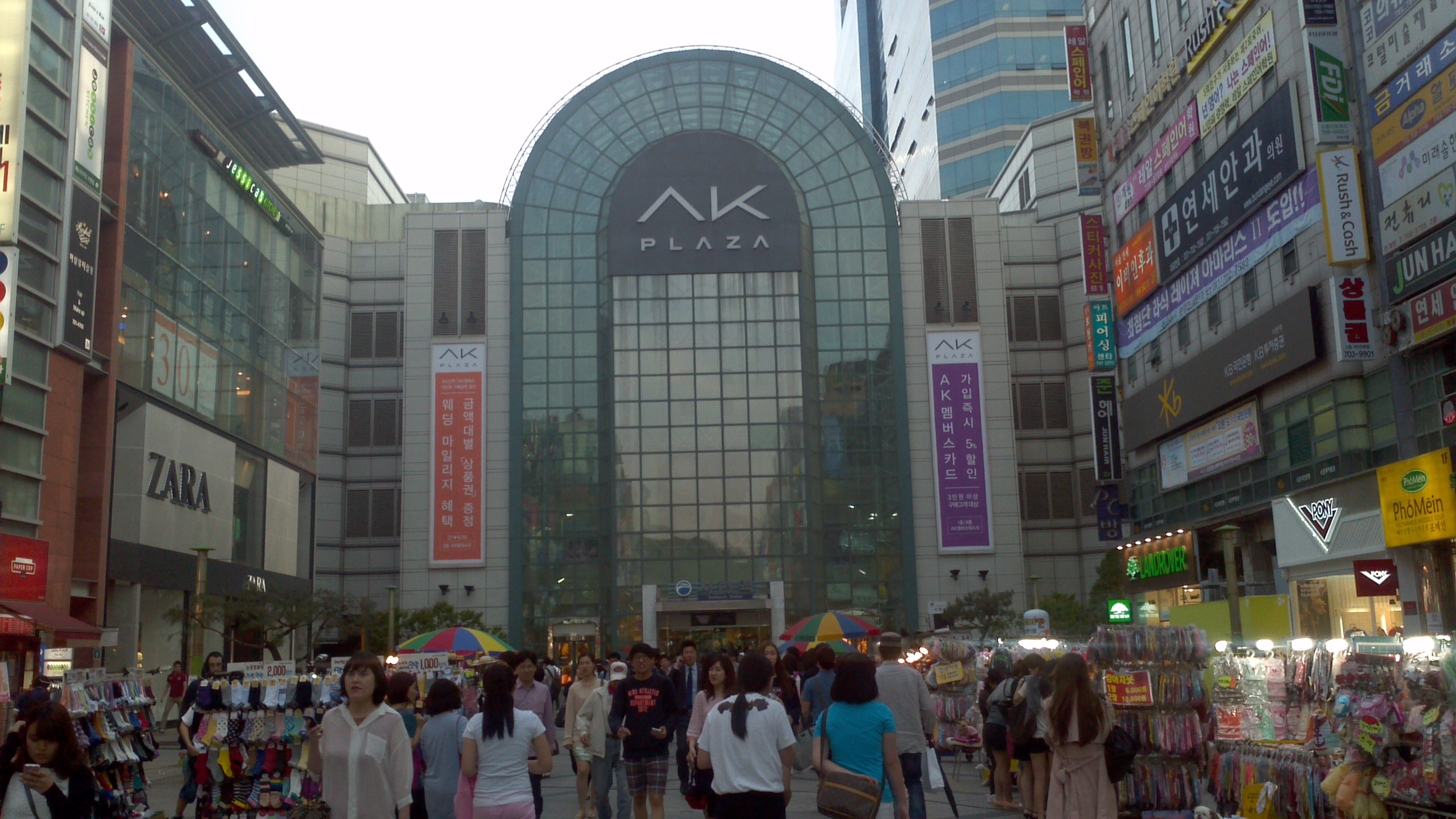
- Location: 37.38502°N 127.12334°E
- Website: www.e-akplaza-bd.kr (in Korean)
- Interactive map of AK Plaza, Bundang

AK Plaza, Bundang, formerly Samsung Plaza (Korean: 삼성플라자), is a shopping mall located in Seohyeon-dong, Bundang, Seongnam, South Korea. The building is 98m or about 3 stories tall.

Samsung Corporation opened Samsung Plaza Store No. 1, a multi-functional shopping center. It is equipped with facilities such as the lobby, playrooms and cafes, and facilities for the handicapped. Samsung Plaza consists of a department store, specialty stores and cultural, educational and entertainment facilities.

Samsung Plaza grew substantially. In 1997, the total sales revenue was 270 billion won. By 2004, it had doubled to 540 billion won. In 2005, Bundang Samsung Plaza ranked 6th in amount of sales in South Korea.

In February 2007, Samsung Corporation signed a contract with ARD Holdings, Inc. to sell Samsung Plaza Department Store.

The building was renamed to AK Plaza on March 2, 2009.

Samsung Plaza in 2007

== See also ==
- Samsung Group
- AK Plaza
