= Radaur Assembly constituency =

Legislative Assembly constituency in Haryana State, India

Coordinates: 30.03°N 77.15°E

Radaur
- Constituency No. 10 for the Haryana Legislative Assembly

Constituency details
- Country: India
- Region: North India
- State: Haryana
- District: Yamunanagar
- Lok Sabha constituency: Kurukshetra
- Total electors: 2,08,790
- Reservation: None

Member of Legislative Assembly
- 15th Haryana Legislative Assembly
- Incumbent Shyam Singh Rana
- Party: Bharatiya Janata Party

Radaur Assembly constituency is one of the 90 Legislative Assembly constituencies of Haryana state in India. And Shyam Singh Rana Wins In 2024.

It is part of Yamunanagar district.

== Members of the Legislative Assembly ==
Year	Member	Party
1977	Lehri Singh	Janata Party
1982	Ram Singh	Independent politician
1987	Rattan Lal Kataria	Bharatiya Janata Party
1991	Lehri Singh	Haryana Vikas Party
1996	Banta Ram	Samata Party
2000	Banta Ram	Indian National Lok Dal
2005	Ishwar Singh Palaka	Indian National Lok Dal
2009	Bishan Lal Saini	Indian National Lok Dal
2014	Shyam Singh Rana	Bharatiya Janata Party
2019	Bishan Lal Saini	Indian National Congress
2024	Shyam Singh Rana	Bharatiya Janata Party

== Election results ==
=== Assembly Election 2024 ===
2024 Haryana Legislative Assembly election: Radaur
Party	Candidate	Votes	%	±%
BJP	Shyam Singh Rana	73,348	47.93%	▲11.67
INC	Dr. Bishan Lal Saini	60,216	39.35%	▲1.30
BSP	Dharampal Tigra	11,182	7.31%	▼5.75
AAP	Bhim Singh Rathi	3,245	2.12%	▲1.12
ASP(KR)	Mandeep Topra	2,959	1.93%	New
NOTA	None of the Above	538	0.35%	▼0.44
Margin of victory		13,132	8.58%	▲6.79
Turnout		1,53,018	73.28%	▲0.28
Registered electors		2,08,790		▲7.23
BJP gain from INC		Swing	▲9.88	

=== Assembly Election 2019 ===
2019 Haryana Legislative Assembly election: Radaur
Party	Candidate	Votes	%	±%
INC	Bishan Lal Saini	54,087	38.05%	25.05%
BJP	Karan Dev	51,546	36.26%	−9.19%
BSP	Mahipal Singh	18,567	13.06%	5.88%
JJP	Manga Ram	7,161	5.04%	
INLD	Rajbeer	3,687	2.59%	−16.63%
LSP	Harbans Kumar	2,589	1.82%	
AAP	Naresh Lal	1,419	1.00%	
NOTA	Nota	1,126	0.79%	
Sarva Hit Party	Ravi Kumar	779	0.55%	
Margin of victory		2,541	1.79%	−24.44%
Turnout		1,42,147	73.00%	−9.03%
Registered electors		1,94,726		8.23%
INC gain from BJP		Swing	-7.40%	

=== Assembly Election 2014 ===
2014 Haryana Legislative Assembly election: Radaur
Party	Candidate	Votes	%	±%
BJP	Shyam Singh	67,076	45.45%	33.59%
INLD	Raj Kumar Bubka	28,369	19.22%	−6.48%
INC	Subhash Chaudhry	19,184	13.00%	−8.88%
BSP	Sanjay Kumar	10,594	7.18%	−7.32%
Independent	Mohit Kait	7,732	5.24%	
Independent	Ajay Pal	5,402	3.66%	
Independent	Rishi Pal	3,850	2.61%	
Haryana Kranti Dal	Kuldeep Singh S/O Jai Singh	1,329	0.90%	
CPI	Balwant	928	0.63%	
Margin of victory		38,707	26.23%	22.41%
Turnout		1,47,571	82.02%	3.48%
Registered electors		1,79,911		22.73%
BJP gain from INLD		Swing	19.75%	

=== Assembly Election 2009 ===
2009 Haryana Legislative Assembly election: Radaur
Party	Candidate	Votes	%	±%
INLD	Bishan Lal Saini	29,593	25.70%	−1.71%
INC	Suresh Kumar	25,198	21.88%	−0.17%
BSP	Ashwani Kumar	16,698	14.50%	10.15%
BJP	Shyam Singh	13,657	11.86%	−3.81%
Independent	Randhir Singh	7,090	6.16%	
HJC(BL)	Mam Raj	6,093	5.29%	
Independent	Harish Chander	5,597	4.86%	
Independent	Sanjeev Kumar	3,507	3.05%	
Independent	Daya Nand	2,932	2.55%	
Independent	Rishi Pal	1,970	1.71%	
Independent	Satish Kumar	688	0.60%	
Margin of victory		4,395	3.82%	−1.54%
Turnout		1,15,143	78.55%	−2.19%
Registered electors		1,46,594		20.44%
INLD hold		Swing	-1.71%	

=== Assembly Election 2005 ===
2005 Haryana Legislative Assembly election: Radaur
Party	Candidate	Votes	%	±%
INLD	Ishwar Singh Palaka	26,933	27.41%	−20.31%
INC	Lehri Singh	21,670	22.05%	−17.55%
Independent	Ram Singh	17,724	18.04%	
BJP	Krishan Bedi	15,401	15.67%	
BRP	Rajbir	6,588	6.70%	
BSP	Attar Singh	4,281	4.36%	1.10%
LJP	Singara Singh	1,850	1.88%	
CPI	Simru Ram	1,228	1.25%	
Independent	Jai Kumar	1,161	1.18%	
Independent	Sukhbir Singh	779	0.79%	
Margin of victory		5,263	5.36%	−2.76%
Turnout		98,266	80.73%	4.15%
Registered electors		1,21,718		14.50%
INLD hold		Swing	-20.31%	

=== Assembly Election 2000 ===
2000 Haryana Legislative Assembly election: Radaur
Party	Candidate	Votes	%	±%
INLD	Banta Ram	38,551	47.72%	
INC	Ram Singh	31,996	39.60%	14.23%
HVP	Priti Lal	5,787	7.16%	
BSP	Naresh Kumar	2,632	3.26%	−10.28%
Independent	Rishala Ram	548	0.68%	
Independent	Suresh Kumar	536	0.66%	
Independent	Sukhbir Alahar	427	0.53%	
Margin of victory		6,555	8.11%	−3.36%
Turnout		80,793	76.58%	−1.81%
Registered electors		1,06,300		−3.11%
INLD gain from SAP		Swing	14.50%	

=== Assembly Election 1996 ===
1996 Haryana Legislative Assembly election: Radaur
Party	Candidate	Votes	%	±%
SAP	Banta Ram	30,765	36.85%	
INC	Ram Singh	21,184	25.38%	−0.73%
BJP	Rattan Lal	11,700	14.02%	10.32%
BSP	Naresh Kumar	11,301	13.54%	
Independent	Chhote Lal	1,551	1.86%	
JD	Puran Chand	937	1.12%	
Independent	Shanta Ram	919	1.10%	
Independent	Hisam Singh	858	1.03%	
Independent	Amar Nath	697	0.83%	
Independent	Ram Parkash	566	0.68%	
AIIC(T)	Ram Niwas	555	0.66%	
Margin of victory		9,581	11.48%	7.91%
Turnout		83,477	78.39%	7.68%
Registered electors		1,09,716		14.34%
SAP gain from HVP		Swing	3.64%	

=== Assembly Election 1991 ===
1991 Haryana Legislative Assembly election: Radaur
Party	Candidate	Votes	%	±%
HVP	Lehri Singh	21,645	33.21%	
JP	Banta Ram	19,321	29.65%	
INC	Ram Singh	17,010	26.10%	8.94%
BJP	Rattan Lal	2,409	3.70%	−49.12%
Independent	Kura Ram	2,130	3.27%	
Independent	Ramesh Kumar	449	0.69%	
Independent	Mehar Chand	335	0.51%	
Margin of victory		2,324	3.57%	−30.26%
Turnout		65,167	70.71%	−3.17%
Registered electors		95,960		14.61%
HVP gain from BJP		Swing	-19.61%	

=== Assembly Election 1987 ===
1987 Haryana Legislative Assembly election: Radaur
Party	Candidate	Votes	%	±%
BJP	Rattan Lal	32,215	52.82%	37.88%
Independent	Lehri Singh	11,586	19.00%	
INC	Chand Ram	10,469	17.17%	−13.55%
Independent	Jasmer	2,571	4.22%	
Independent	Jagmal	814	1.33%	
Independent	Baldev Singh	542	0.89%	
Independent	Nar Singh	423	0.69%	
Margin of victory		20,629	33.82%	20.76%
Turnout		60,990	73.88%	1.45%
Registered electors		83,724		19.96%
BJP gain from Independent		Swing	9.04%	

=== Assembly Election 1982 ===
1982 Haryana Legislative Assembly election: Radaur
Party	Candidate	Votes	%	±%
Independent	Ram Singh	21,759	43.78%	
INC	Lahri Singh	15,265	30.72%	12.75%
BJP	Rattan Lal	7,424	14.94%	
JP	Shanta Ram	2,544	5.12%	−46.96%
Independent	Balak Ram	1,696	3.41%	
Independent	Prem	531	1.07%	
Margin of victory		6,494	13.07%	−16.13%
Turnout		49,696	72.43%	4.13%
Registered electors		69,794		23.62%
Independent gain from JP		Swing	-8.29%	

=== Assembly Election 1977 ===
1977 Haryana Legislative Assembly election: Radaur
Party	Candidate	Votes	%	±%
JP	Lehri Singh	19,868	52.07%	
Independent	Ram Singh	8,728	22.88%	
INC	Mula Ram	6,853	17.96%	
Independent	Barkha Ram	827	2.17%	
Independent	Rakha	689	1.81%	
Independent	Jai Singh	643	1.69%	
Independent	Shiv Ram	440	1.15%	
Margin of victory		11,140	29.20%	
Turnout		38,153	68.30%	
Registered electors		56,460		
JP win (new seat)				

== See also ==
- List of constituencies of the Haryana Legislative Assembly
- Yamunanagar district
