= Samseong-dong, Daejeon =

Samseong-dong
- Location within South Korea
- Country: South Korea

Area
  - Total: 1.30 km^{2} (0.50 sq mi)

Population (2001)
  - Total: 19,129
  - Density: 14,715/km^{2} (38,110/sq mi)

Korean name
- Hangul: 삼성동
- Hanja: 三省洞
- RR: Samseong-dong
- MR: Samsŏng-dong

Samseong-dong (Korean: 삼성동) is a ward of Dong-gu, Daejeon, South Korea.
