= Sanxing =

Sanxing can refer to:

== Places ==
=== China ===
- Sanxing, Enyang (三星乡), a township in Enyang District, Bazhong, Sichuan
- Sanxing, Jianyang (三星镇), a town in Jianyang, Chengdu, Sichuan
- Sanxing, Jintang (三星镇), a town in Jintang County, Chengdu, Sichuan
- Sanxing, Shanghai (三星镇), a town in Chongming District, Shanghai
- Sanxing, Shizhu (三星乡), a township in Shizhu County, Chongqing
- Sanxing, Shuangliu (三星镇), a town in Shuangliu District, Chengdu, Sichuan
- Sanxing (三星镇), until 2012 the name of Quanshui (泉水镇), a town in Rucheng County, Hunan
- Sanxing (三姓), a historical name of Yilan County, Heilongjiang
- Sanxing railway station, a station on the Suiyu Railway in Suining, Sichuan
- Sanxingdui, an archeological site in Guanghan, Sichuan

=== Taiwan ===
- Sanxing, Yilan, a township in Yilan County

== Other ==
- Sanxing (deities), three gods in Chinese religion

== See also ==
- Sanxian, a Chinese lute
- Sanxiang, a town in Zhongshan, Guangdong, China
- 三星 (disambiguation)
