= Samsung Cup =

Samsung Cup may refer to:

- Samsung Fire Cup, international Go competition
- Samsung Hauzen Cup South Korean football competition
- Samsung Securities Cup, professional tennis tournament
