= Bishan Lal Saini =

Indian politician

Member of the Haryana Legislative Assembly
- In office 2019–2024
- Succeeded by: Shyam Singh Rana
- Constituency: Radaur
- In office 2009–2014
- Constituency: Radaur

Personal details
- Born: Bishan Saini; 1954 (age 71–72) Radaur, Haryana, India
- Party: Indian National Congress
- Other political affiliations: Indian National Lok Dal

Bishan Lal Saini (born 1954) is an Indian politician from Haryana. He is a former member of the Haryana Legislative Assembly from Radaur Assembly constituency. He was nominated again to contest the Radaur seat by the Indian National Congress but lost to BJP candidate Shyam Singh Rana by a margin of 13,132 votes.

== Early life and education ==
Saini was born to Sukh Ram Saini in Radaur, Haryana. He is a graduate in Ayurvedic Medicine and Surgery from Shri Mast Nath Ayurvedic College, Rohtak in 1977 under Maharshi Dayanand University, Rohtak.

== Career ==
Saini wlost the 2024 Haryana Legislative Assembly election. Previously, Saini won the 2019 Haryana Legislative Assembly election representing the Indian National Congress. He polled 54,087 votes and defeated his nearest rival, Karan Dev of the Bharatiya Janata Party, by a margin of 2,541 votes. Earlier, he became an MLA for the first time winning the 2000 Haryana Legislative Assembly election from Jagadhri Assembly constituency representing Bahujan Samaj Party. Later, he won the 2009 Haryana Legislative Assembly election from Radaur Assembly constituency representing the Indian National Lok Dal.
