= Super 8 (video game accessory) =

Unlicensed video game peripheral for the Super Nintendo Entertainment System

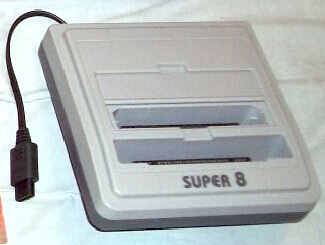
A Super 8 accessory

The Super 8, also sold under the title Tri-star or Tristar, is an unlicensed video game peripheral released in 1995 for the Super Nintendo Entertainment System designed to allow the system to run games developed for the Nintendo Entertainment System. The Super 8 utilized an NES-on-a-chip integrated circuit to duplicate the functionality of the original NES hardware, and connected to the SNES's own cartridge slot.

== Design ==
The Super 8's appearance is a light grey, squarish adapter that is plugged into the SNES so that the user is allowed the playing of 8-bit NES and Famicom games on the device. It has an RF out and a SNES type multi-out connector providing RCA output. A lead goes from the Tri-Star to the SNES' multi-out port, and then the user is able to plug the SNES A/V lead and/or RF lead into the Tri-Star. When playing a SNES game, the Tri-Star passes through the SNES composite video picture.

The Super 8 features three cartridge ports. Two of these ports connected to the onboard NOAC, and were designed to fit NES and Famicom cartridges, respectively: despite otherwise featuring exactly the same hardware, North American and European NES game cartridges used a 72-pin design, resulting in slightly larger cartridges than the Famicom, which used a 60-pin design. The third port was designed to fit standard SNES cartridges, and merely connected with the SNES's native hardware, so that the user would not have to remove the Super 8 in order to play SNES games.

A similar idea was later employed for the Tristar 64, an accessory for the Nintendo 64 console with the ability to play both NES and SNES cartridges.

== Operation ==
The main purpose of the Super 8 is to provide the ability to play both SNES and NES games with one single console. There are three ports: one for standard NES cartridges, one for the Japanese Famicom cartridges, and one for SNES cartridges. Only one cartridge can fit in each slot at a time. After the peripheral is attached and the device is turned on, a menu will appear on the television screen; giving the user a choice between an 8-bit or 16-bit game. The user is able to play any one of the cartridges plugged in the system at a time.

SNES games operate identically to their original versions. NES games, however, have their controls revamped for the SNES controller. The Super 8 also plays Super Famicom games, as there are no tabs to block the insertion of the flat back cartridges.

== Limitations ==
There are quite a few issues present within the system that affect gameplay. Some games are unable to function properly when playing on the Super 8 (One example would be in the compilation cartridge Super Mario All-Stars + World there are many occasions in which the screen rolls, rendering gameplay practically impossible). The Start and Select buttons on the second controller do not work at all, likely a relic of the Japanese Famicom which had hard-wired controllers, only the first of which had Start and Select buttons. The use of specific NES joysticks and other controller peripherals that were meant for the original consoles usually do not work when connecting it to the Super 8. European model SNES users are only able to play European SNES games, other overseas games were incompatible. There are also brightness issues present in some games.

However, there has been much controversy over a misleading piece of information that was included with the system. The instruction booklet for the Super 8 apparently claims that the Super 8 provides RGB output, however this is actually false. There is no RGB-support for the peripheral at all—as the pass-through lead that is plugged into the SNES multi-out only carries composite video and stereo audio.

== See also ==
- Tristar 64
- Famiclone
- Super Nintendo Entertainment System
