= Tristar 64 =

Unlicensed add-on for Nintendo 64

The Tristar 64 is an unlicensed add-on for the Nintendo 64 (N64) video game console. Produced in Hong Kong by Future Laboratory, the Tristar 64 features two additional cartridge ports which are designed to accept cartridges created for the Nintendo Entertainment System (NES, a.k.a. Famicom) and Super Nintendo Entertainment System (SNES, a.k.a. Super Famicom). The device then emulates the NES (via an NES-on-a-chip) or SNES hardware, and allows the cartridge to be run. The device also features built-in cheat cartridge functionality through a program called the X-Terminator, as well as the Memory Editor, which allows SRAM and EEPROM saved game data to be archived and edited.

The Tristar 64 requires a separate power supply, and connects to a television via RCA composite output cables, with the N64's video output routed first through the adaptor. The Tristar 64 is similar to the Super 8, a device which allowed NES cartridges to be played on a SNES console.
