= Samsung Hub =

Samsung Hub may refer to:

- Samsung Music Hub, Samsung's digital entertainment store
- Samsung Hub (building), a skyscraper located in the central business district of Singapore
