= Three star =

Three star or three stars is a grading received in a star classification scheme.

Three star or three stars may also refer to:

== Music ==
- Mitsuboshi, stylized as ☆☆☆, debut studio album of the character Kirari Tsukishima from the Japanese anime Kirarin Revolution
- "Three Stars" (song), a 1959 song written by Tommy Dee

== Rankings and awards ==
- Georgia's Own Credit Union 3 Stars of the Year Award, ice hockey award
- Order of the Three Stars, Latvian decoration for merit in service
- Three-star rank, a senior military rank
- Three-star rating system, used within certain video games

== Sport ==
- Three stars (ice hockey), triple equivalent of "man of the match" in other sports
- Three Star Club, a Nepalese association football club

== Other uses ==
- Flag of the Republic of the Rio Grande, nicknamed the Three Star Flag
- Samsung, which means "Three stars" in Korean
- Three Stars (Chinese constellation), a group of seven stars
- Three Stars (militant group), a former Tamil militant group in Sri Lanka
- Three Star Gods, Chinese gods of happiness, rank and longevity

== See also ==
- *** (disambiguation), three asterisks
- "Theme from Dr. Kildare (Three Stars Will Shine Tonight)", a TV show theme and 1962 single
- Tristar (disambiguation)
- 三星 (disambiguation) (literally: 3 Stars)
