= City Hall station (Daejeon Metro) =

Metro station in Daejeon, South Korea

111 시청 City Hall
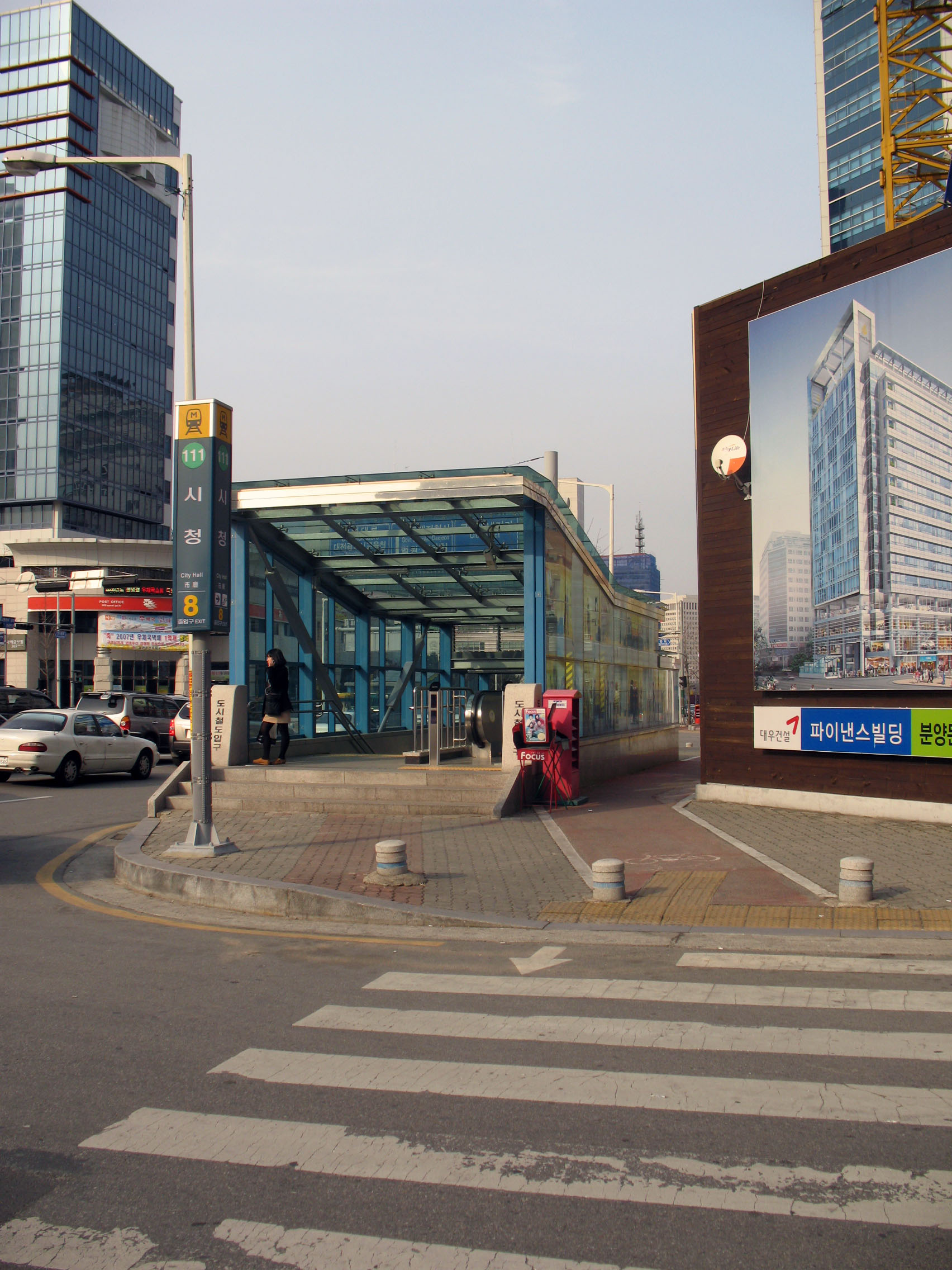
- City Hall Station Exit No.8(Before substation name notation)

Korean name
- Hangul: 시청역
- Hanja: 市廳驛
- Revised Romanization: Sicheong-yeok
- McCune–Reischauer: Sich'ŏng-yŏk

General information
- Location: Dunsan-dong, Seo District, Daejeon; South Korea
- Coordinates: 36°21′05″N 127°23′12″E
- Operator: Daejeon Metropolitan Express Transit Corporation
- Line: Daejeon Metro Line 1
- Platforms: 2
- Tracks: 2

Other information
- Station code: 111

History
- Opened: March 16, 2006; 20 years ago

Services
Preceding station	Daejeon Metro	Following station
Tanbang towards Panam	Line 1	Government Complex, Daejeon towards Banseok
Location

City Hall Station (Korean: 시청역; Hanja: 市廳驛) is a station of the Daejeon Metro Line 1 in Dunsan-dong, Seo District, Daejeon, South Korea.
