= Oryong station =

Metro station in Daejeon, South Korea

108 오룡 Oryong
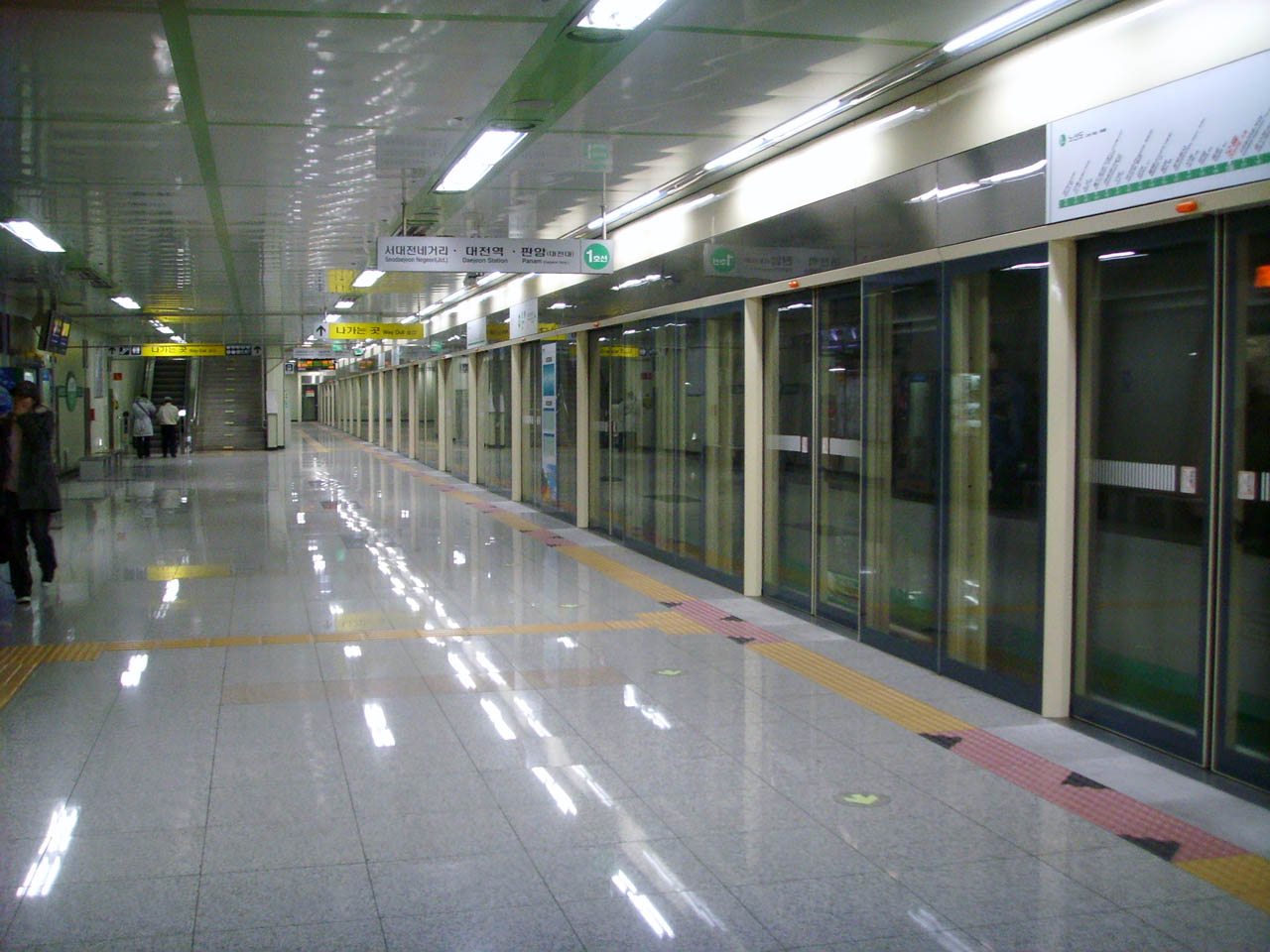

Korean name
- Hangul: 오룡역
- Hanja: 五龍驛
- Revised Romanization: Oryong-yeok
- McCune–Reischauer: Oryong-yŏk

General information
- Location: Oryu-dong, Jung District, Daejeon; South Korea
- Coordinates: 36°19′42″N 127°24′17″E
- Operator: Daejeon Metropolitan Express Transit Corporation
- Line: Daejeon Metro Line 1
- Platforms: 2
- Tracks: 2

Other information
- Station code: 108

History
- Opened: March 16, 2006; 20 years ago

Services
Preceding station	Daejeon Metro	Following station
Seodaejeon Negeori towards Panam	Line 1	Yongmun towards Banseok
Location

Oryong Station (Korean: 오룡역; Hanja: 五龍驛) is a station of Daejeon Metro Line 1 in Oryu-dong, Jung District, Daejeon, South Korea.
