= Tanbang station =

Metro station in Daejeon

110 탄방 (다빈치병원) Tanbang (Davinci Hospital)
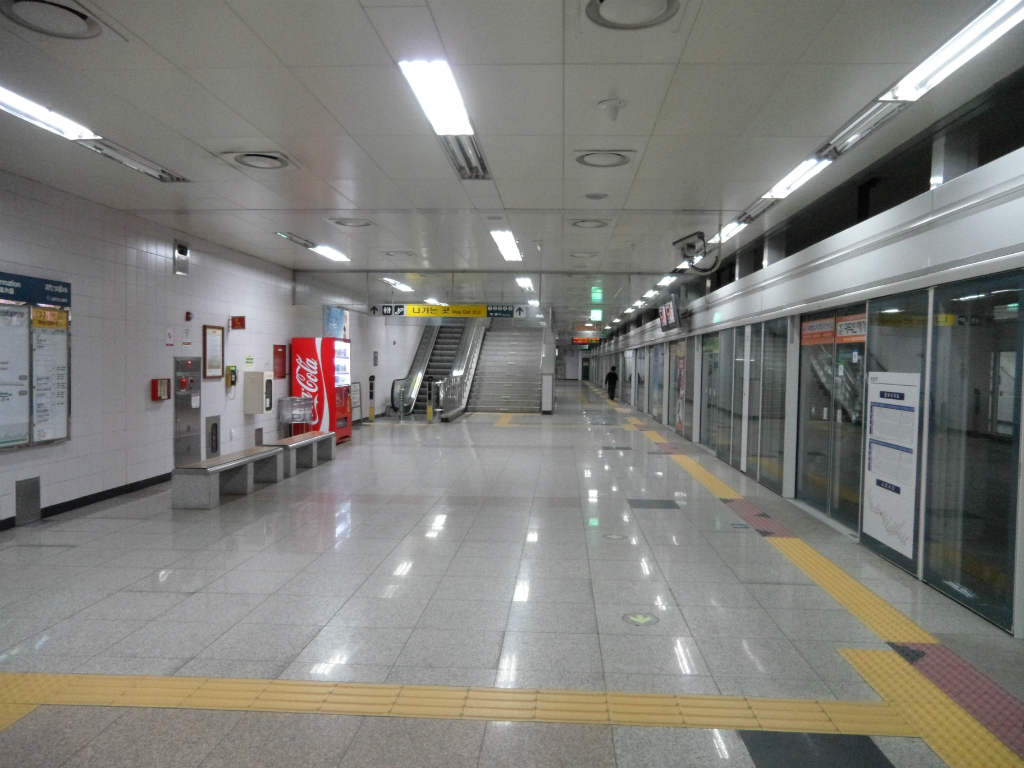
- Tanbang Station Platform(Before substation name notation)

Korean name
- Hangul: 탄방역
- Hanja: 炭坊驛
- Revised Romanization: Tanbang yeok
- McCune–Reischauer: T'anpang yŏk

General information
- Location: Tanbang-dong, Seo District, Daejeon; South Korea
- Coordinates: 36°20′44″N 127°23′05″E
- Operator: Daejeon Metropolitan Express Transit Corporation
- Line: Daejeon Metro Line 1
- Platforms: 2
- Tracks: 2

Other information
- Station code: 110

History
- Opened: March 16, 2006; 20 years ago

Services
Preceding station	Daejeon Metro	Following station
Yongmun towards Panam	Line 1	City Hall towards Banseok
Location

Tanbang Station (Korean: 탄방역; Hanja: 炭坊驛) is a station of the Daejeon Metro Line 1 in Tanbang-dong, Seo District, Daejeon, South Korea.
