= Noeun station =

Metro station in Daejeon, South Korea

120 노은 Noeun
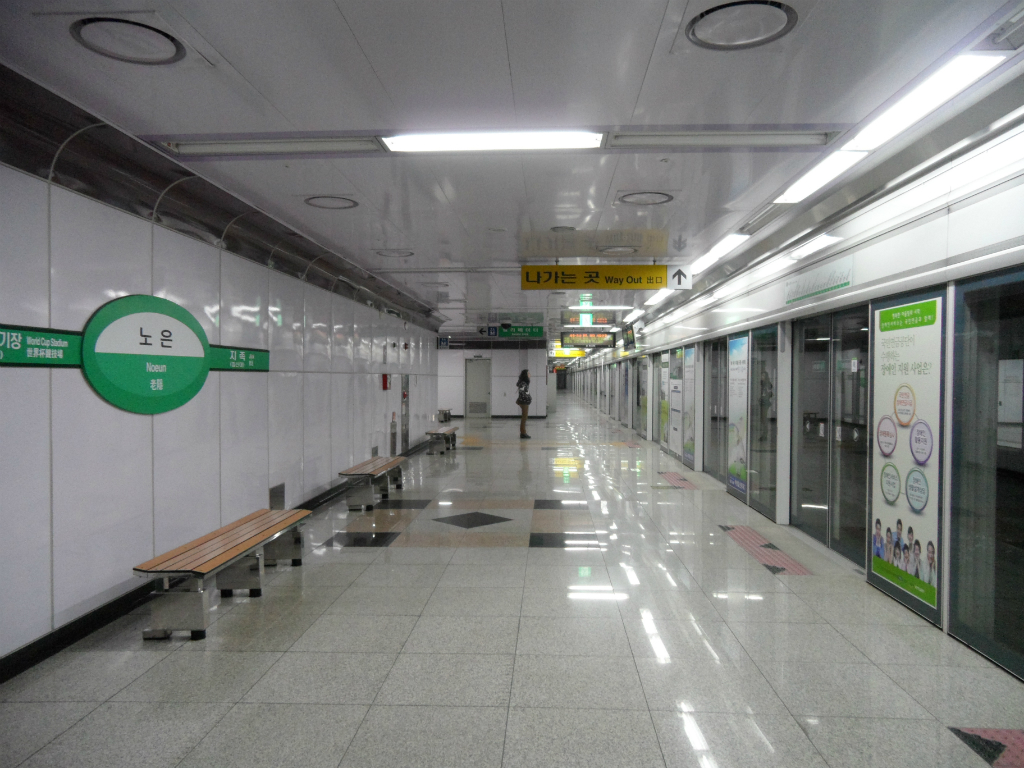

Korean name
- Hangul: 노은역
- Hanja: 老隱驛
- Revised Romanization: Nueun yeok
- McCune–Reischauer: Noŭn yŏk

General information
- Location: Noeun-dong, Yuseong District, Daejeon; South Korea
- Coordinates: 36°22′27″N 127°19′04″E
- Operator: Daejeon Metropolitan Express Transit Corporation
- Line: Daejeon Metro Line 1
- Platforms: 2
- Tracks: 2

Other information
- Station code: 120

History
- Opened: 17 April 2007; 19 years ago

Services
Preceding station	Daejeon Metro	Following station
World Cup Stadium towards Panam	Line 1	Jijok towards Banseok
Location

Noeun Station (Korean: 노은역; Hanja: 老隱驛) is a station of Daejeon Metro Line 1 in Noeun-dong, Yuseong District, Daejeon, South Korea.

== Surroundings ==
In the vicinity of Nogun Station, there are Ji Jok Mountain, DaeJeon Ji jok High School, DaeJeon Ji juk Middle School, DaeJon SangJi Elementary School, Durubong Neighborhood Park and Eung- GuBi Park.

The location is 161 underground of Noeun in Yuseong-gu, Daejeon Metropolitan City.
