= Guam station (Daejeon Metro) =

Metro station in Daejeon, South Korea

117 구암 (유성복합터미널) Guam (Yuseong Complex Terminal)
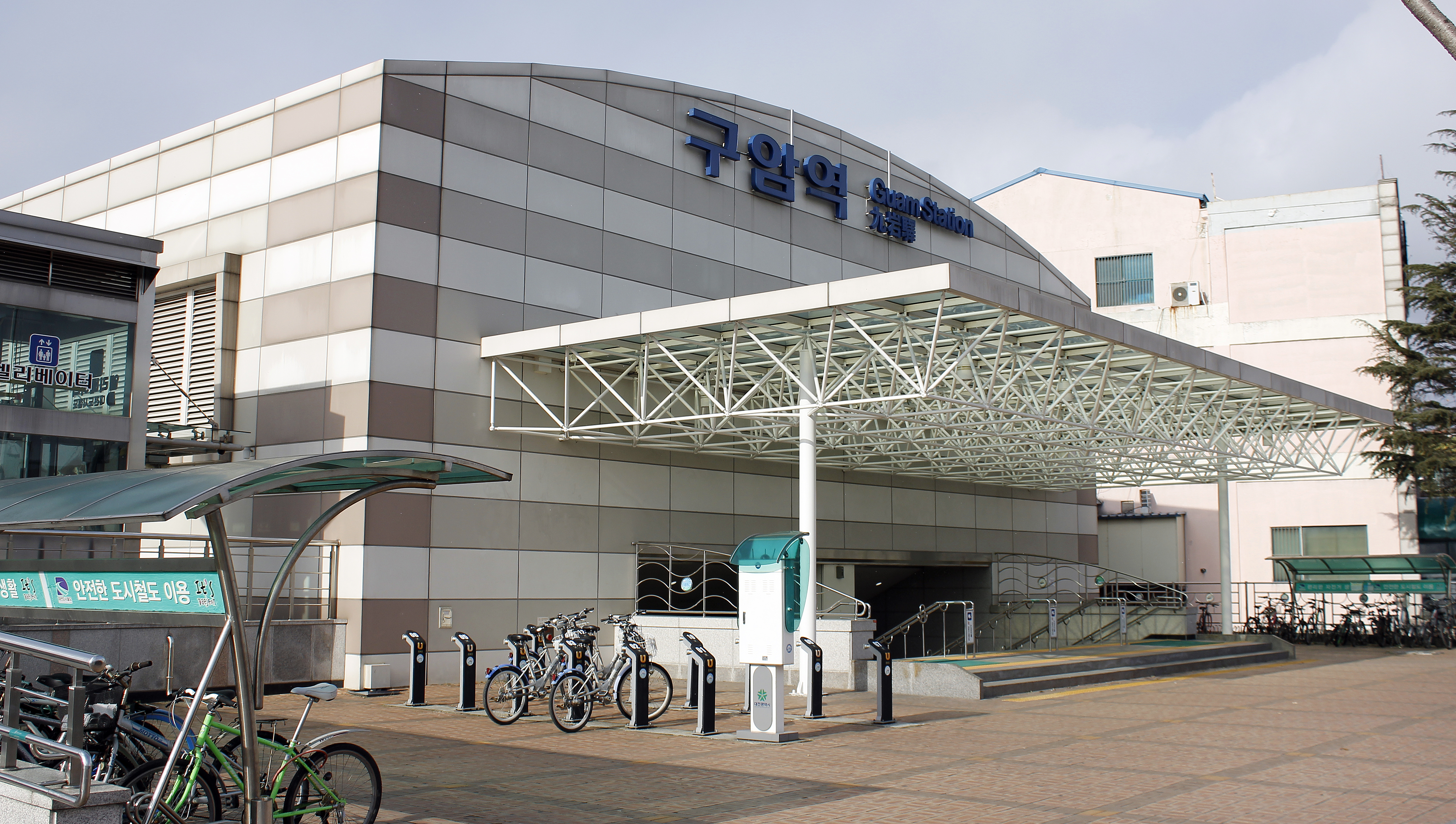

Korean name
- Hangul: 구암역
- Hanja: 九岩驛
- Revised Romanization: Guam-yeok
- McCune–Reischauer: Kuam-yŏk

General information
- Location: Guam-dong, Yuseong District, Daejeon; South Korea
- Coordinates: 36°21′24″N 127°19′51″E
- Operator: Daejeon Metropolitan Express Transit Corporation
- Line: Daejeon Metro Line 1
- Platforms: 2
- Tracks: 2

Other information
- Station code: 117

History
- Opened: April 17, 2007; 19 years ago

Services
Preceding station	Daejeon Metro	Following station
Yuseong Spa towards Panam	Line 1	National Cemetery towards Banseok
Location

Guam Station (Korean: 구암역; Hanja: 九岩驛) is a station of the Daejeon Metro Line 1 in Guam-dong, Yuseong District, Daejeon, South Korea.
