= Yuseong Spa station =

Metro station in Daejeon, South Korea

116 유성온천 (충남대·목원대) Yuseong Spa (Chungnam Nat'l Univ.·Mokwon Univ.)
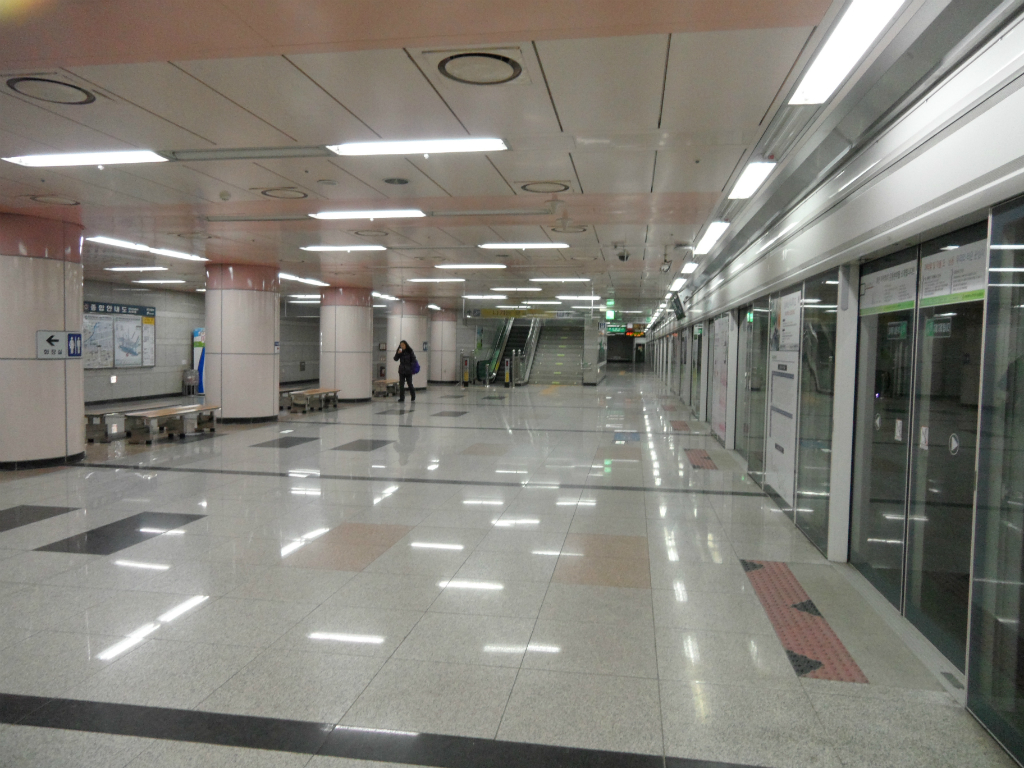
- Yuseong Spa Station platform

Korean name
- Hangul: 유성온천역
- Hanja: 儒城溫泉驛
- Revised Romanization: Yuseongoncheon yeok
- McCune–Reischauer: Yusŏngonch'ŏn yŏk

General information
- Location: Bongmyeong-dong, Yuseong District, Daejeon; South Korea
- Coordinates: 36°21′13″N 127°20′29″E
- Operator: Daejeon Metropolitan Express Transit Corporation
- Line: Daejeon Metro Line 1
- Platforms: 2
- Tracks: 2

Other information
- Station code: 116

History
- Opened: April 17, 2007; 19 years ago

Services
| Preceding station | Daejeon Metro | Following station |
|---|---|---|
| Gapcheon towards Panam | Line 1 | Guam towards Banseok |
Location

Yuseong Spa Station (Korean: 유성온천역; Hanja: 儒城溫泉驛) is a station of Daejeon Metro Line 1 in Bongmyeong-dong, Yuseong District, Daejeon, South Korea.
