= Yongmun station (Daejeon Metro) =

Metro station in Daejeon, South Korea

109 용문 (가톨릭병원) Yongmun (Catholic Hospital)
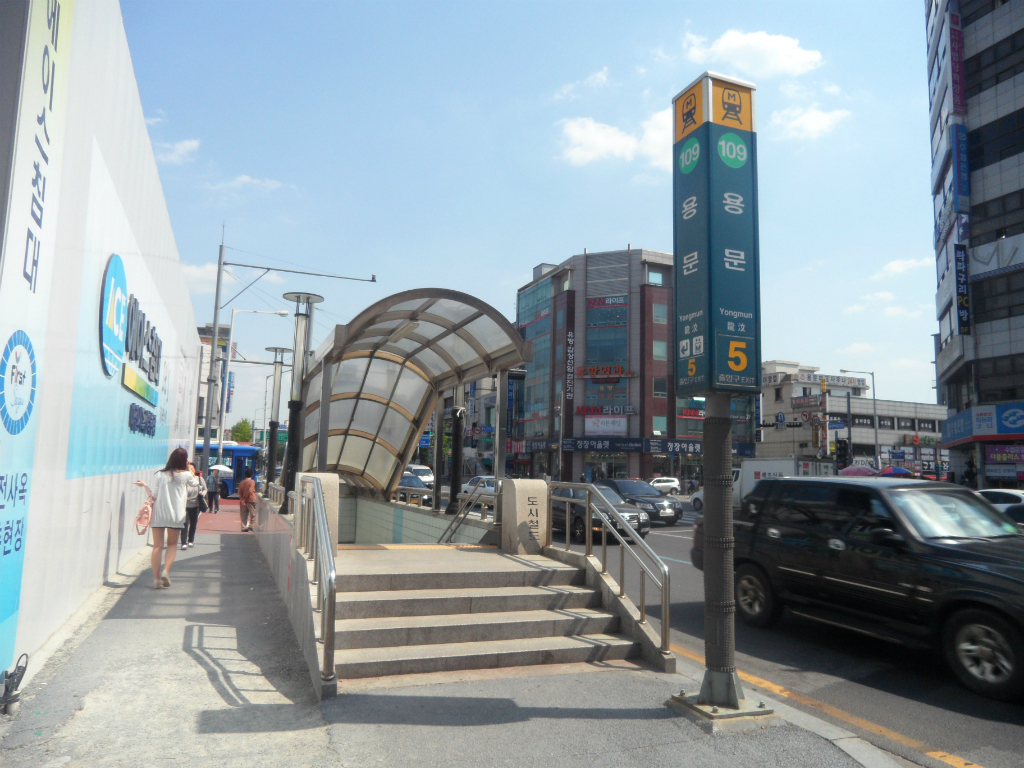
- Yongmun station exit No.5 (before substation name notation)

Korean name
- Hangul: 용문역
- Hanja: 龍汶驛
- Revised Romanization: Yongmun yeok
- McCune–Reischauer: Yongmun yŏk

General information
- Location: Yongmun-dong, Jung District, Daejeon; South Korea
- Coordinates: 36°20′18″N 127°23′36″E
- Operator: Daejeon Metropolitan Express Transit Corporation
- Line: Daejeon Metro Line 1
- Platforms: 2
- Tracks: 2

Other information
- Station code: 109

History
- Opened: March 16, 2006; 20 years ago

Services
Preceding station	Daejeon Metro	Following station
Oryong towards Panam	Line 1	Tanbang towards Banseok
Location

Yongmun station (Korean: 용문역; Hanja: 龍汶驛) is a station of Daejeon Metro Line 1 in Yongmun-dong, Jung District, Daejeon, South Korea. It is located between Oryong station and Tanbang station of Daejeon Metro Line 1. This station is located across the Yudeung Stream from Oryong station. It is 7.82 kilometres (4.86 mi) away from Panam.

== Surroundings ==
Apartment complexes and residential areas are located in the vicinity of the Yongmun station, and there are nearby Hanmin Traditional Market and Highland Fish Market.
