= Daejeon Metro Line 2 =

Tram line under construction in Daejeon, South Korea

Line 2

Overview
- Native name: 2호선
- Owner: City of Daejeon
- Locale: Daejeon
- Stations: 45

Service
- Type: Light rail
- System: Daejeon Metro
- Services: 3
- Operator: Daejeon Metropolitan Express Transit Corporation

History
- Opened: 2030; 4 years' time (planned)

Technical
- Line length: 38.8 kilometres (24.1 mi)

Daejeon Metro Line 2 is a street-level tram line under construction in Daejeon, South Korea. Opening of the line is scheduled for 2030.

== History ==
In 1995, there were basic plans for five subway lines within Daejeon spread over 100 km of track. While Daejeon Metro Line 1 started construction in 1996, Line 2 has gone through a number of changes and proposals over the years, including making it a maglev modeled after the maglev in the National Science Museum. The maglev design passed a feasibility study in 2012, but two years later it was announced the new line would be a streetcar tram system. In 2015, a basic plan was established and the following year they announced the route, which included two demonstration routes that would later be connected, one in an urban area and one in a business area. In 2017, the maglev feasibility plan officially expired, which officially ended plans for the line to be a maglev unless a new feasibility study would be conducted.

In 2018, the Korea Development Institute (KDI) began a new feasibility study, this time for the proposed tram but was exempted along with 22 other projects as part of the 2019 Balanced National Development Project before passing KDI's review in August 2019.

== Stations ==
Station Number	Station Name English	Station Name Hangul	Station Name Hanja	Transfer	Line Name	Distance in km	Total Distance	Location	
201	Seodaejeon	서대전	西大田	Chungcheong Metropolitan Railroad	Line 2	----	0.00	Daejeon	Jung
202	Seodaejeon Negeori	서대전네거리	西大田네거리	Line 1	Line 2	0.5	0.5	Daejeon	Jung
203	Daesa	대사	大興		Line 2	0.6	1.1	Daejeon	Jung
204	Daeheung	대흥	大興		Line 2	1.2	2.3	Daejeon	Jung
205	Indong	인동	仁洞		Line 2	1.0	3.3	Daejeon	Dong
206	Daejeon (Subway)	대전 (도시철도)	大田 (都市鐵道)	Line 1 Chungcheong Metropolitan Railroad	Line 2	0.9	4.2	Daejeon	Dong
207	Daejeon	대전	大田	Line 1	Line 2	0.9	5.1	Daejeon	Dong
208	Daedong	대동	大洞	Line 1	Line 2	0.8	5.9	Daejeon	Dong
209	Jayang	자양	紫陽		Line 2	0.7	6.6	Daejeon	Dong
210	Gayang	가양	佳陽		Line 2	1.2	7.8	Daejeon	Dong
211	Daejeon Terminal Complex	대전복합터미널	大田複合터미널		Line 2	1.0	8.8	Daejeon	Dong
212	Yongjeon	용전	龍田		Line 2	0.6	9.4	Daejeon	Daedeok
213	Jungni	중리	中里		Line 2	0.7	10.1	Daejeon	Daedeok
214	Ojeong	오정	梧井	Chungcheong Metropolitan Railroad	Line 2	0.6	10.7	Daejeon	Daedeok
215	Ojeong Agro-Fishery Market	오정농수산물시장	梧井農水産物市場		Line 2	1.1	11.8	Daejeon	Daedeok
216	Dunsan	둔산	屯山		Line 2	1.0	12.8	Daejeon	Seo
217	Sammeori Negeori	샘머리네거리			Line 2	0.8	13.6	Daejeon	Seo
218	Government Complex Daejeon	정부청사	政府廳舍	Line 1	Line 2	0.6	14.2	Daejeon	Seo
219	Dunsan Prehistoric Site	둔산선사유적지	屯山先史遺蹟地		Line 2	0.7	14.9	Daejeon	Seo
220	Mannyeon	만년	萬年		Line 2	0.7	15.6	Daejeon	Seo
221	Expo Science Park	엑스포과학공원	엑스포科學公園		Line 2	0.8	16.4	Daejeon	Yuseong
222	KAIST	카이스트	韓國科學技術院		Line 2	1.6	18.0	Daejeon	Yuseong
223	Yuseonggu District Office	유성구청	儒城區廳		Line 2	1.2	19.2	Daejeon	Yuseong
224	Chungnam Nat'l Univ.	충남대	忠南大		Line 2	0.9	20.1	Daejeon	Yuseong
225	Yuseong Spa (Chungnam Nat'l Univ., Mokwon Univ.)	유성온천(충남대·목원대)	儒城溫泉(忠南大·牧圓大	Line 1	Line 2	1.0	21.1	Daejeon	Yuseong
226	Sangdae	상대	上垈		Line 2	0.7	21.8	Daejeon	Yuseong
227	Wongol	원골	원골		Line 2	0.6	22.4	Daejeon	Yuseong
228	Wonang Negeori	대전시립박물관	大田市立博物館		Line 2	0.8	23.2	Daejeon	Seo
229	Mokwon Univ.	목원대	牧園大		Line 2	0.6	23.8	Daejeon	Yuseong
230	Yonggye	용계	龍溪		Line 2	0.9	24.7	Daejeon	Yuseong
231	Daejeong	대정	大井		Line 2	0.7	25.4	Daejeon	Yuseong
232	Wonang Negeori	원앙네거리	鴛鴦네거리		Line 2	0.8	26.2	Daejeon	Seo
233	Gwanjeo Negeori	관저네거리	關雎네거리		Line 2	0.9	27.1	Daejeon	Seo
234	Gwanjeo	관저	關雎		Line 2	0.6	27.7	Daejeon	Seo
235	Gasuwon	가수원	佳水院		Line 2	0.8	28.5	Daejeon	Seo
236	Jeongnim	정림	正林		Line 2	1.3	29.8	Daejeon	Seo
237	Doma	도마	桃馬		Line 2	1.0	30.8	Daejeon	Seo
238	Doma Market	도마큰시장	桃馬市場	Chungcheong Metropolitan Railroad	Line 2	0.7	31.5	Daejeon	Seo
239	Budnae	버드내			Line 2	0.8	32.3	Daejeon	Jung
240	Yucheon	유천	柳川		Line 2	0.5	32.8	Daejeon	Jung
241	Beopdong	법동	法洞		Line 2	0.9	33.7	Daejeon	Daedeok
242	Daejeon Institute of Gender Equality and Family	동부여성가족원	東部女性家族院		Line 2	0.8	34.5	Daejeon	Daedeok
243	Eumnae	읍내	邑內		Line 2	0.5	35.0	Daejeon	Daedeok
244	Yeonchuk	연축	連丑		Line 2	1.6	36.6	Daejeon	Daedeok
245	Jinjam	진잠	鎭岑		Line 2	1.1	38.7	Daejeon	Seo

== Rolling stock ==
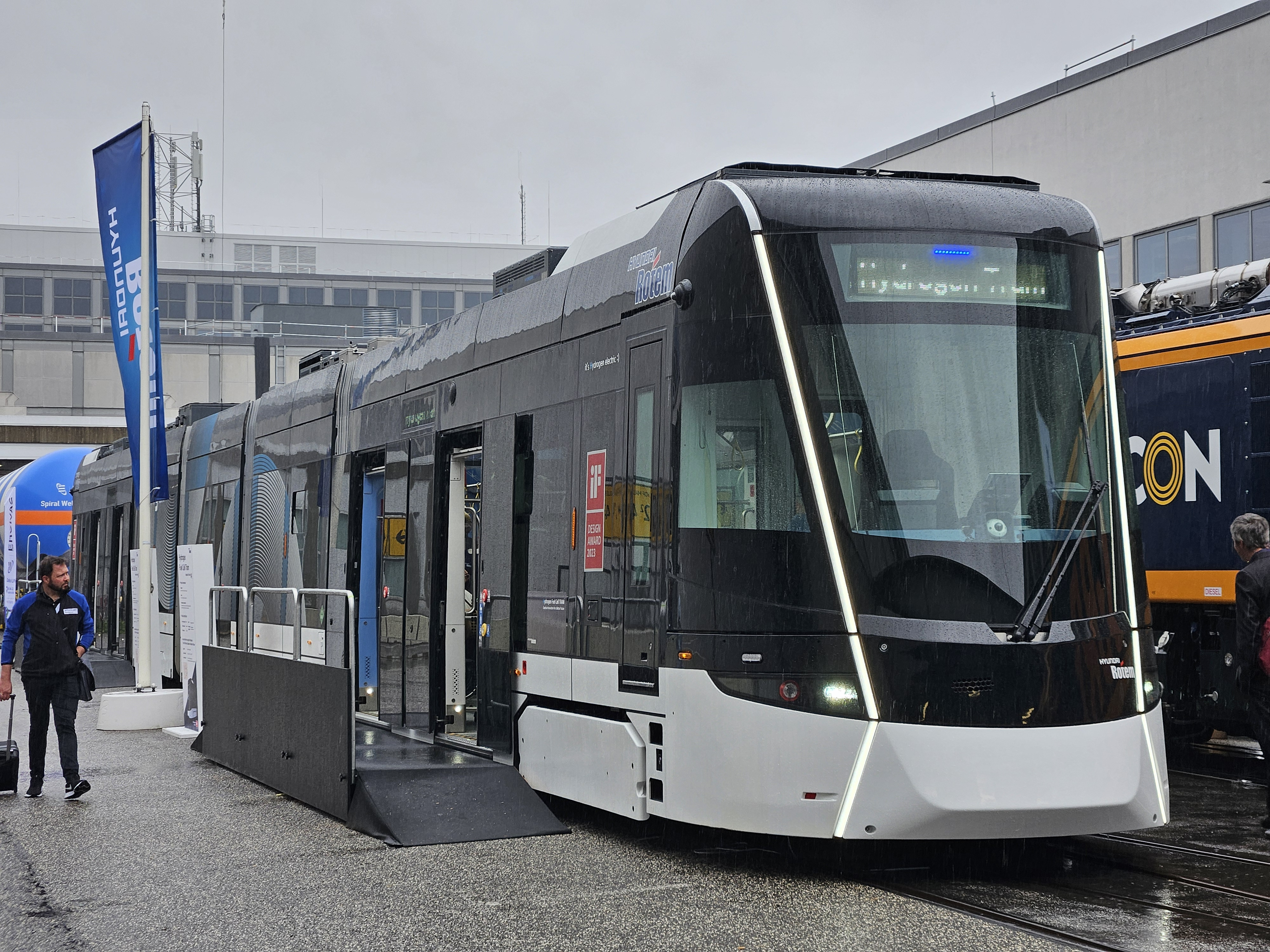
Hyundai Rotem Hydrogen Fuel cell Tram

Line 2 uses Hyundai Rotem Hydrogen Fuel cell Tram. In July 2024, Daejeon City signed a manufacturing contract with Hyundai Rotem for 34 hydrogen tram sets. At the groundbreaking ceremony held on December 11, a preliminary design for the hydrogen tram was unveiled, and subsequently, the trams were painted in light green, one of the city's symbolic colors.

Transparent organic light-emitting diodes are installed on the side windows of the tram, and it is equipped with lithium titanate batteries, a forward collision warning system, and an automatic braking system.

== See also ==
- Daejeon Metro
- Transportation in South Korea
