= Daejeon Station (Daejeon Metro) =

Metro station in Daejeon, South Korea

104 대전역 Daejeon Station
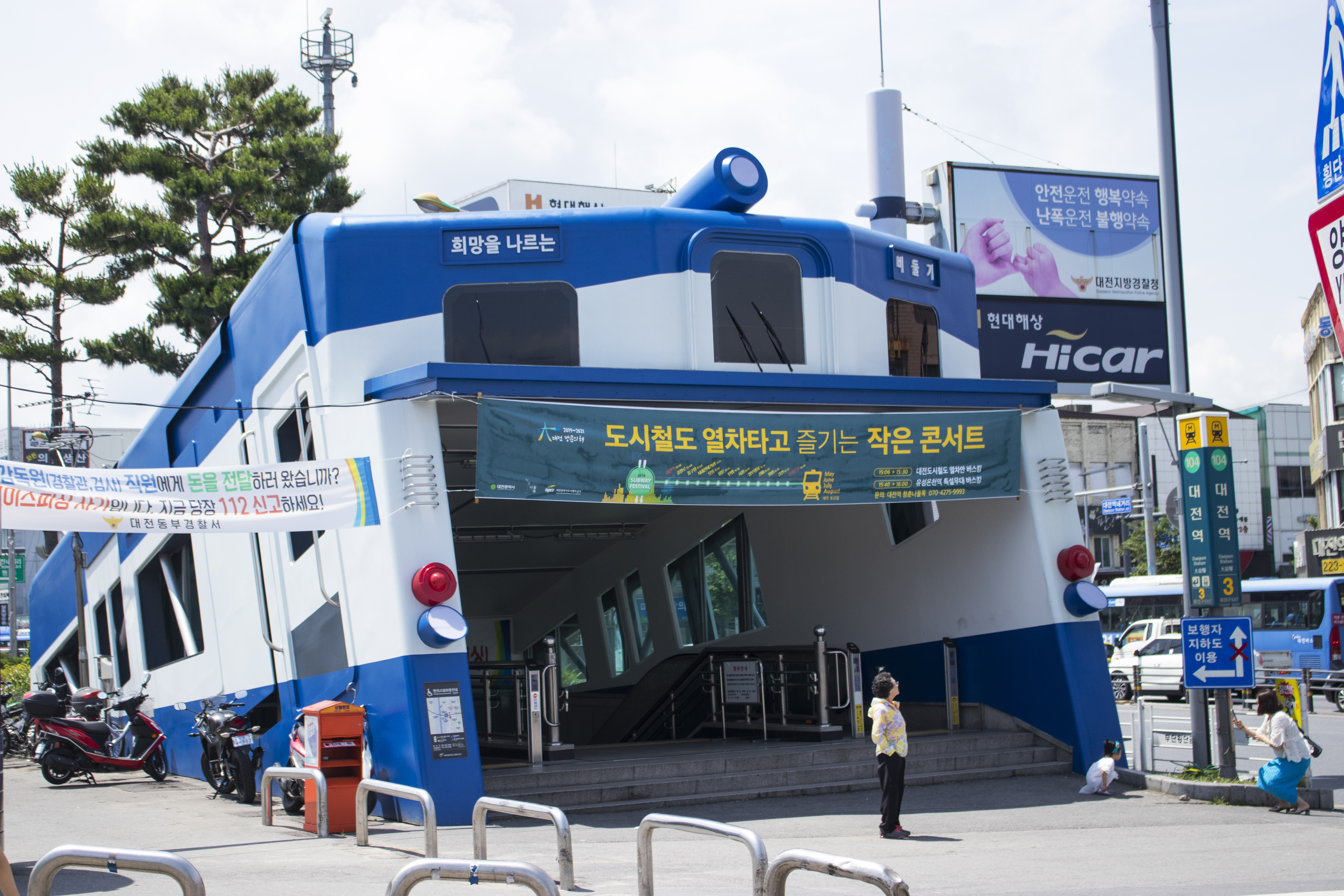

Korean name
- Hangul: 대전역
- Hanja: 大田驛
- Revised Romanization: Daejeon-yeok
- McCune–Reischauer: Taechŏn-yŏk

General information
- Location: Jeong-dong, Dong District, Daejeon; South Korea
- Coordinates: 36°19′53″N 127°25′59″E
- Operator: Daejeon Metropolitan Express Transit Corporation
- Line: Daejeon Metro Line 1
- Platforms: 1
- Tracks: 2
- Connections: Daejeon Station

Other information
- Station code: 104

History
- Opened: March 16, 2006; 20 years ago

Services
Preceding station	Daejeon Metro	Following station
Dae-dong towards Panam	Line 1	Jungangno towards Banseok
Location

Daejeon Station (Korean: 대전역; Hanja: 大田驛) is a station of the Daejeon Metro Line 1 in Jeong-dong, Dong District, Daejeon, South Korea.
