= Seodaejeon Negeori station =

Metro station in Daejeon, South Korea

107 서대전네거리 Seodaejeon Negeori(Jct.)
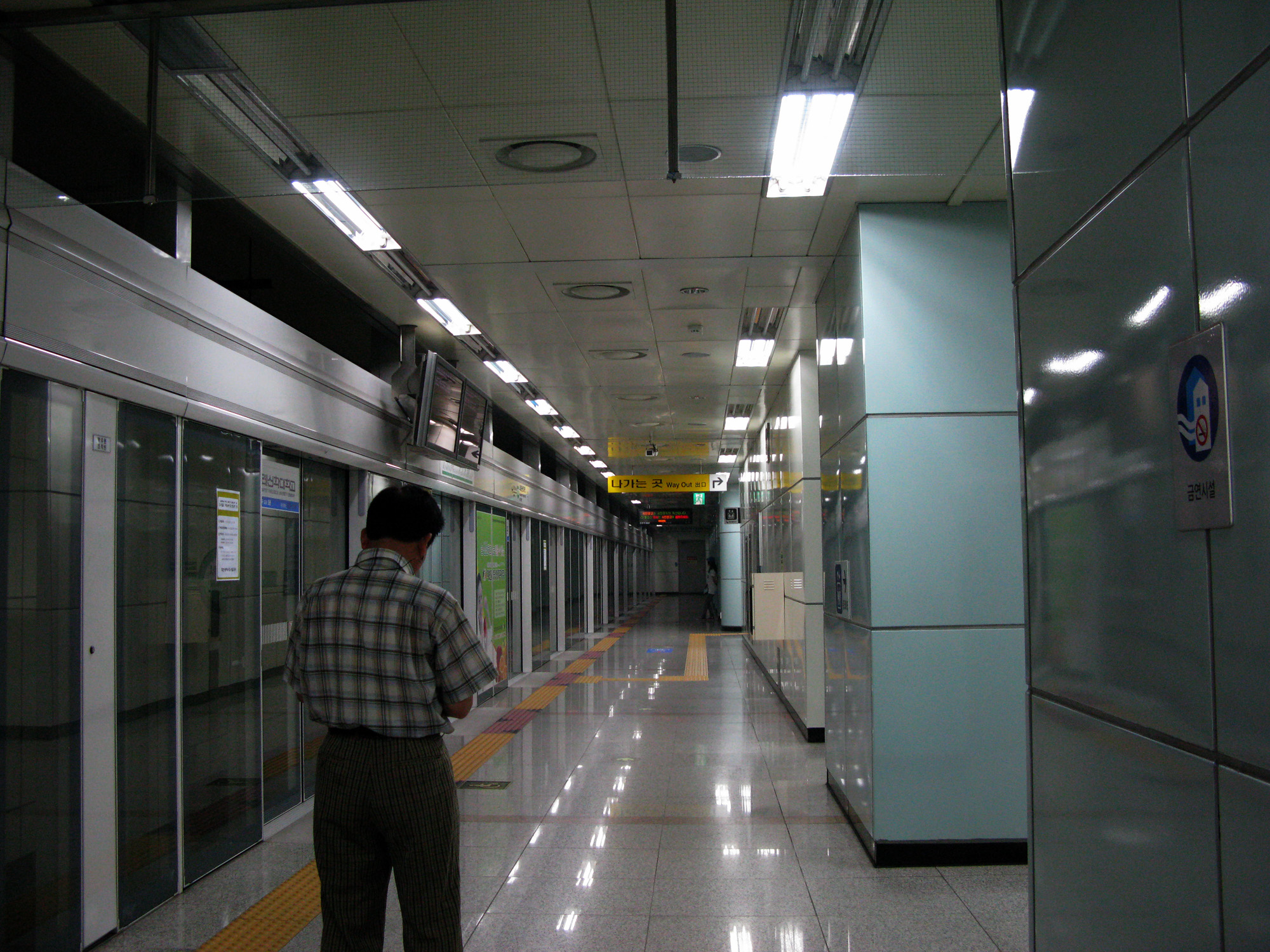
- Seodaejeon Negeori Station platform

Korean name
- Hangul: 서대전네거리역
- Hanja: 西大田네거리驛
- Revised Romanization: Seodaejeonnegeori-yeok
- McCune–Reischauer: Sŏdaejŏnnegŏri-yŏk

General information
- Location: Yongdu-dong, Jung District, Daejeon; South Korea
- Coordinates: 36°19′21″N 127°24′45″E
- Operator: Daejeon Metropolitan Express Transit Corporation
- Line: Daejeon Metro Line 1
- Platforms: 1
- Tracks: 2
- Connections: Seodaejeon station

Other information
- Station code: 107

History
- Opened: March 16, 2006; 20 years ago

Services
Preceding station	Daejeon Metro	Following station
Jung-gu District Office towards Panam	Line 1	Oryong towards Banseok
Location

Seodaejeon Negeori(Jct.) Station (Korean: 서대전네거리역; Hanja: 西大田네거리驛) is a station of Daejeon Metro Line 1 in Yongdu-dong, Jung District, Daejeon, South Korea.

== Elevator incident ==
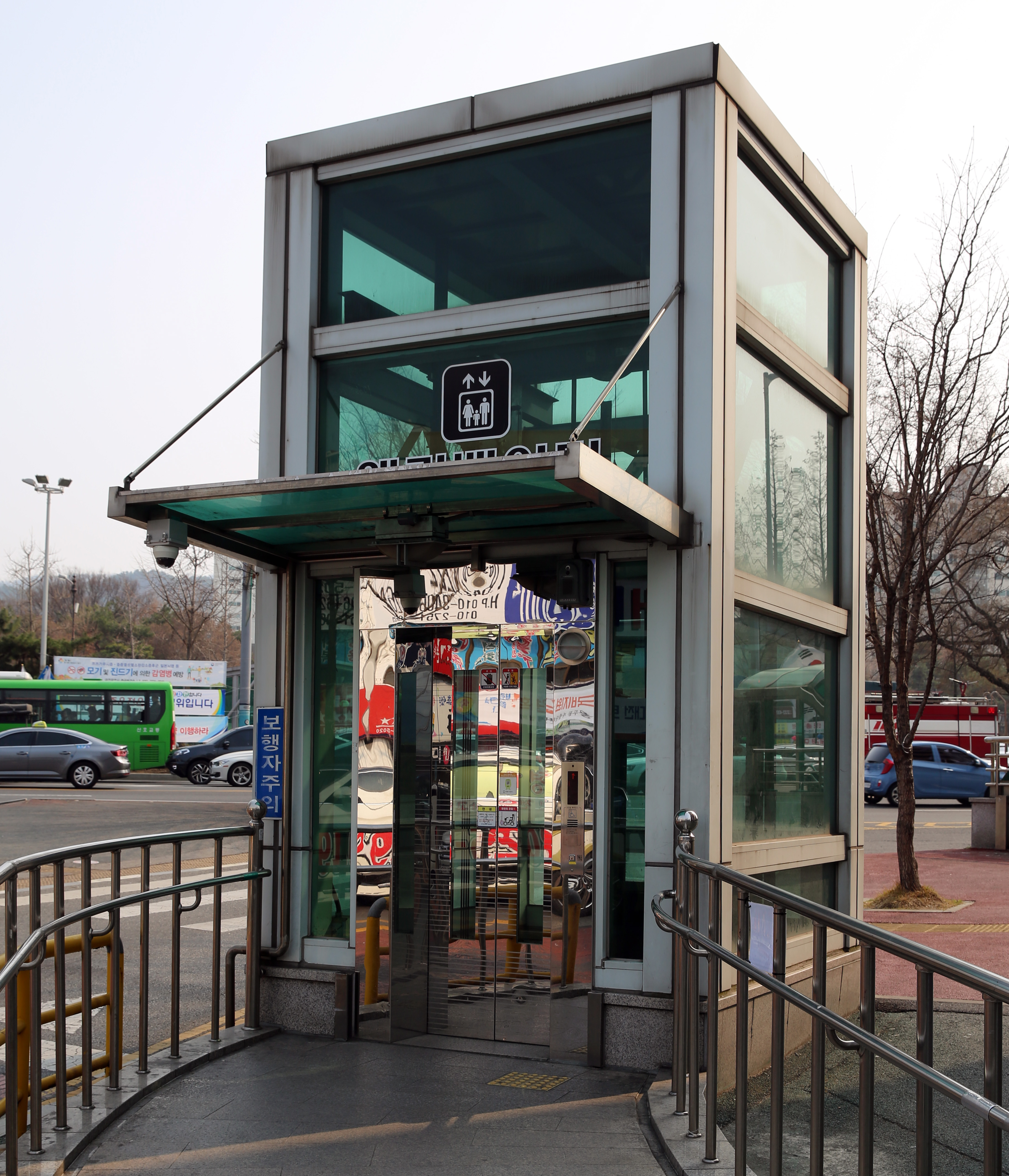
This elevator was the site of a fatal mistake in 2010.

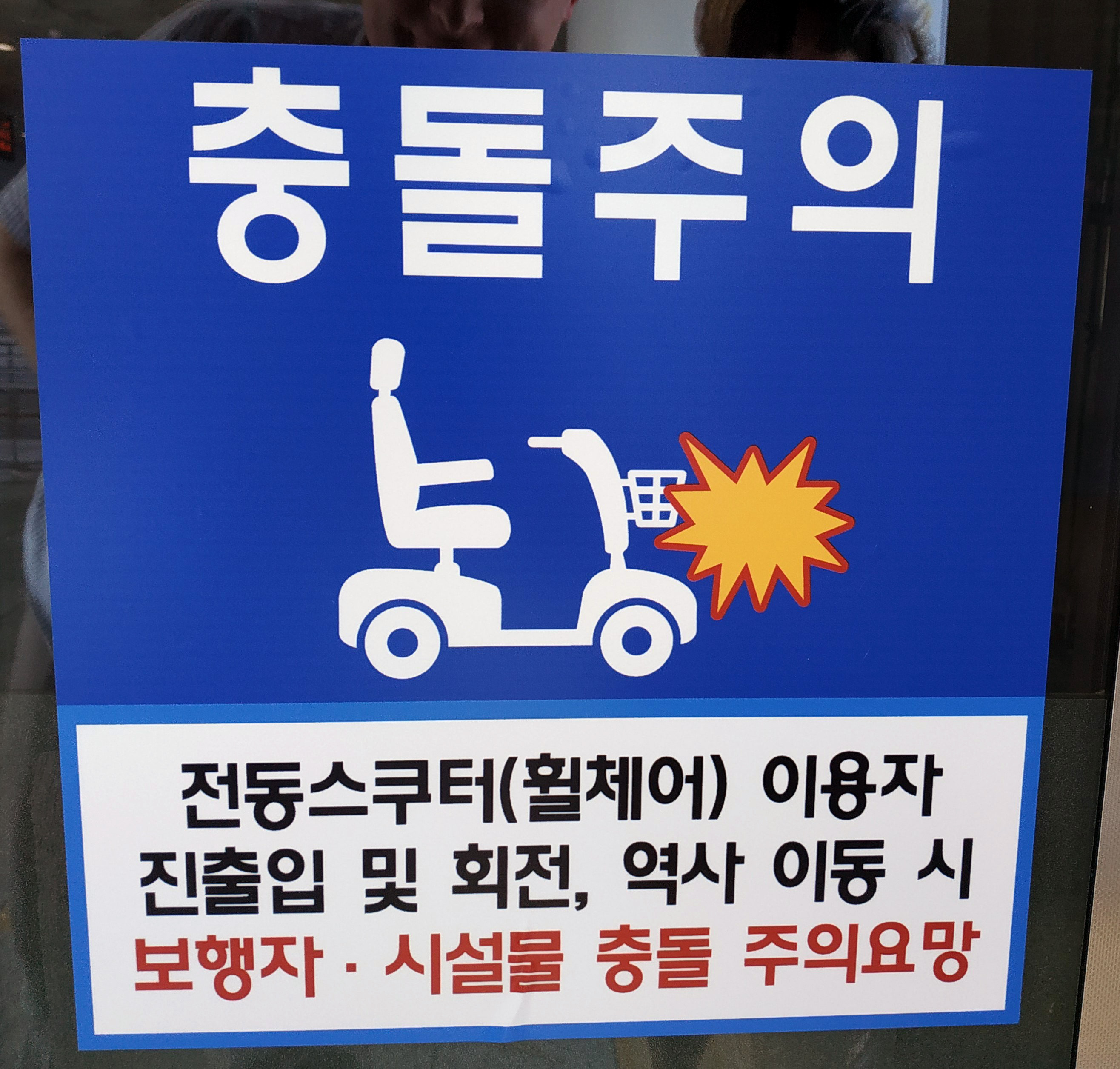
Sticker on an elevator in South Korea telling people not to ram the doors.

This subway station was the site of a man in a wheelchair who rammed the doors of an elevator multiple times, and eventually fell to his death after he disabled both doors. He was awarded a Darwin Award and elevators in South Korean subway stations later started to install stickers telling not to do that action.
