= Galma station =

Metro station in Daejeon

113 갈마 Galma
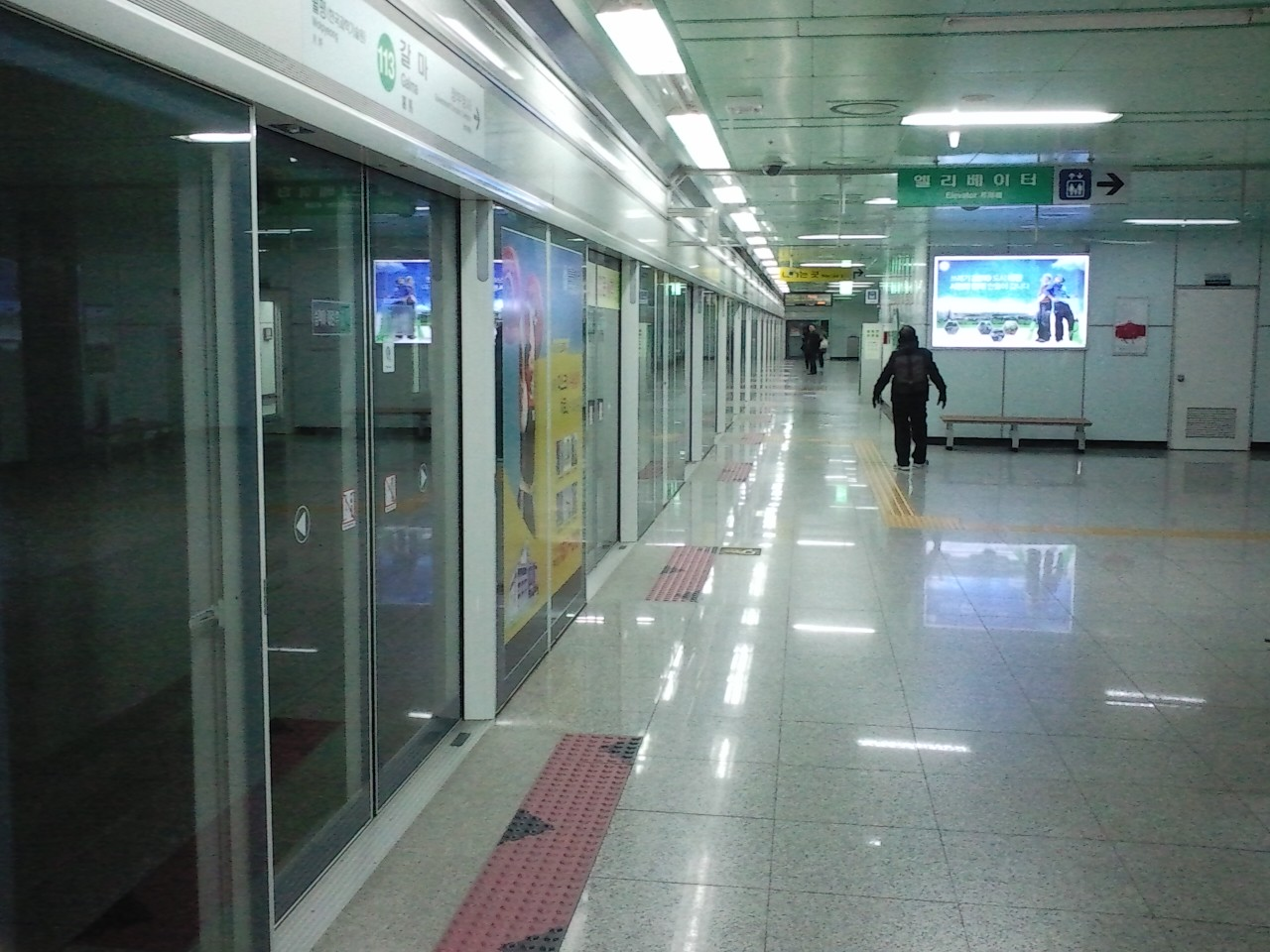

Korean name
- Hangul: 갈마역
- Hanja: 葛馬驛
- Revised Romanization: Galma-yeok
- McCune–Reischauer: Kalma-yŏk

General information
- Location: Galma-dong, Seo District, Daejeon; South Korea
- Coordinates: 36°21′27″N 127°22′21″E
- Operator: Daejeon Metropolitan Express Transit Corporation
- Line: Daejeon Metro Line 1
- Platforms: 2
- Tracks: 2

Other information
- Station code: 113

History
- Opened: April 17, 2007; 19 years ago

Services
Preceding station	Daejeon Metro	Following station
Government Complex, Daejeon towards Panam	Line 1	Wolpyeong towards Banseok
Location

Galma station (Korean: 갈마역) is a station of the Daejeon Metro Line 1 in Galma-dong, Seo District, Daejeon, South Korea. The station is 11.51 kilometres (7.15 mi) from Panam.

== Surroundings ==
There are many apartment complexes and residential areas around the station. On the north side of the station are Daejeon Sungryong Elementary School, Daejeon Sungcheon Elementary School, Daejeon Namseon Middle School, Daejeon Gapcheon Middle School and Seodaejeon High School. On the south side are Dunjimi Park, Karma Park, Daejeon Karma Elementary School and Daejeon Dunsan Girls High School.
