= Jungangno station (Daejeon Metro) =

Metro station in Daejeon, South Korea

105 중앙로 Jungangno
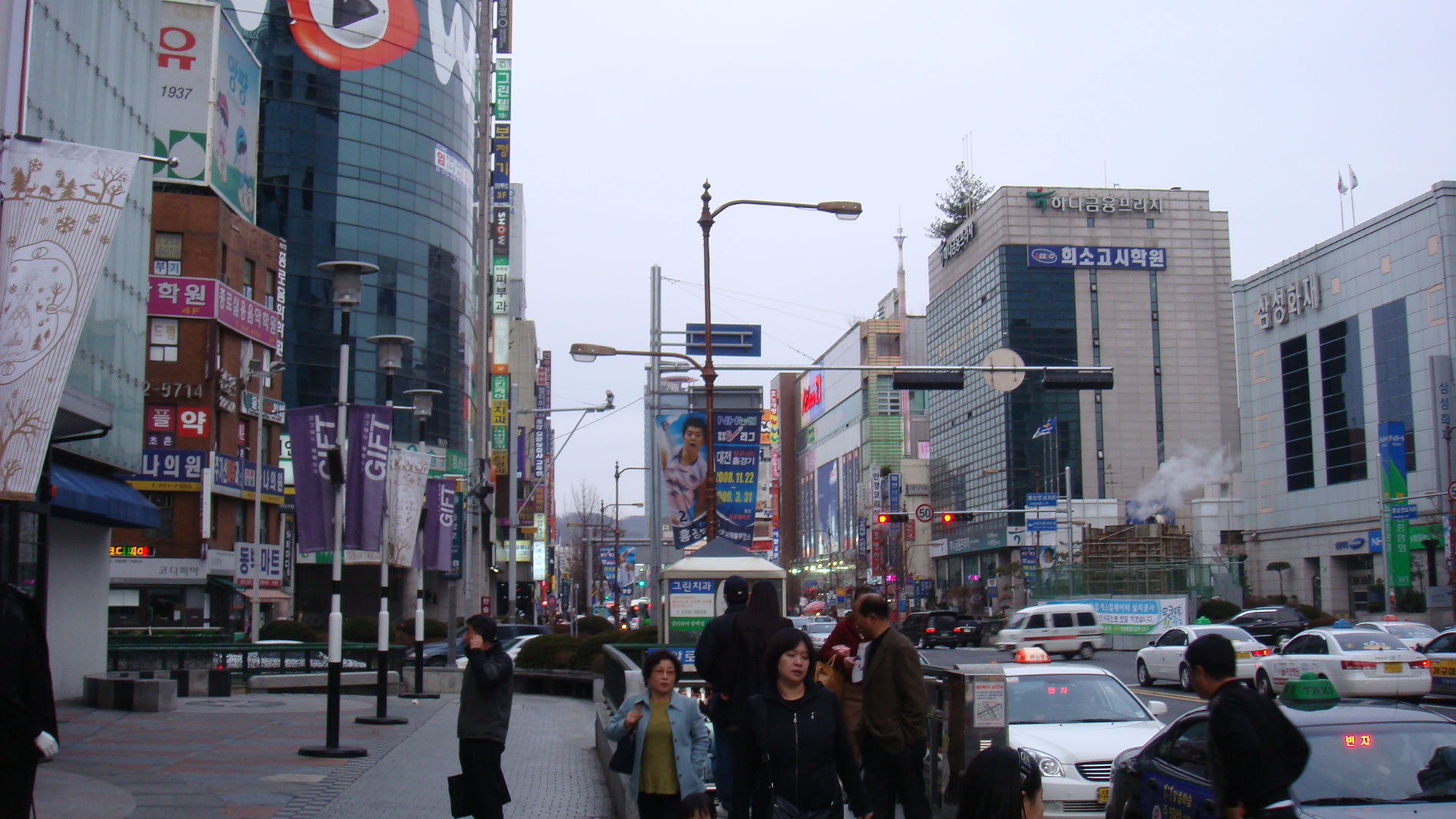

Korean name
- Hangul: 중앙로역
- Hanja: 中央路驛
- Revised Romanization: Jungangno yeok
- McCune–Reischauer: Chungangno yŏk

General information
- Location: Eunhaeng-dong, Jung District, Daejeon; South Korea
- Coordinates: 36°19′43″N 127°25′33″E
- Operator: Daejeon Metropolitan Express Transit Corporation
- Line: Daejeon Metro Line 1
- Platforms: 2
- Tracks: 2

Other information
- Station code: 105

History
- Opened: March 16, 2006; 20 years ago

Services
Preceding station	Daejeon Metro	Following station
Daejeon Station towards Panam	Line 1	Jung-gu District Office towards Banseok
Location

Jungangno Station (Korean: 중앙로역; Hanja: 中央路驛) is a station of Daejeon Metro Line 1 in Eunhaeng-dong, Jung District, Daejeon, South Korea.

This structure is the same as that of the metropolitan area train line 1 in Lee Moon-dong, Dongdaemun-gu, Seoul. In other words, it is the same as that of the island-style platform. As a result, it looks like a mixed type, but it is a two-sided two-wire type. Platform safety screen doors have been installed. It is located between Daejeon Station and Jung-gu Office Station of Daejeon Urban Railway Line 1. It is 4.0 kilometres (2.5 mi) away from Panam. It is connected with Daejeon station which is a train station, and there are many passengers with convenient transportation.

== Surroundings ==
In the vicinity of the station there are 'NC department store Daejeon central road station', 'Hanbat general sports ground' and 'Chungmu gymnasium'. There are many shops and residential areas in the surrounding area, and there is a reverse market nearby.
