= Daejeon World Cup Stadium =

Football stadium in Daejeon, South Korea

- Purple Arena
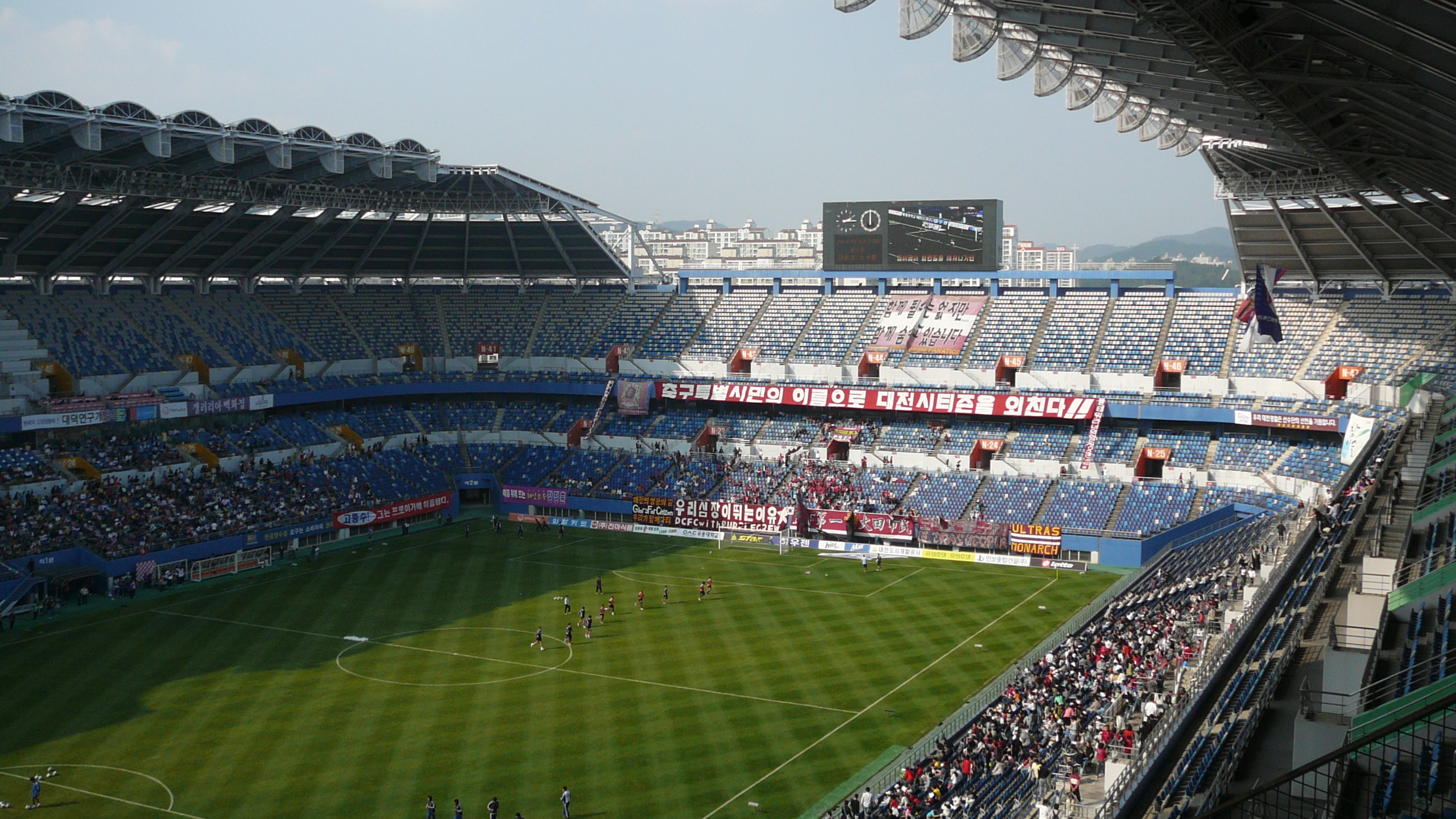
- Daejeon World Cup Stadium
- Interactive map of Daejeon World Cup Stadium
- Location: 32 World Cup-daero, Noeun-dong, Yuseong-gu, Daejeon, Republic of Korea
- Coordinates: 36.365139°N 127.325167°E
- Operator: Daejeon City
- Capacity: 40,535
- Surface: Natural grass
- Public transit: Daejeon Metro: Add→{{rail-interchange}} at World Cup Stadium

Construction
- Groundbreaking: December 1998
- Opened: 13 September 2001
- Cost: 143.9 billion won

Tenant
- Daejeon Hana Citizen (2002–present)

Daejeon World Cup Stadium is a football stadium in the South Korean city of Daejeon. It was used to host some matches at the 2002 FIFA World Cup hosted by South Korea and Japan. The stadium displayed a sophisticated structural dynamism, eliminating decorative decoration. Precast Concrete (PC) method considering construction and economical efficiency was used. After the World Cup, the stadium was planned to be a multi-purpose sports park, which has a comprehensive sports center and commercial and cultural facilities in the middle of the region. It is now the home stadium of Daejeon Hana Citizen with a capacity of 40,535 seats, replacing Daejeon Sports Complex.

== 2002 FIFA World Cup ==
The stadium was one of the venues of the 2002 FIFA World Cup and held the following matches:

| Date | Team 1 | Result | Team 2 | Round | Attendance |
|---|---|---|---|---|---|
| 12 June 2002 | South Africa | 2–3 | Spain | Group B | 31,024 |
| 14 June 2002 | Poland | 3–1 | United States | Group D | 26,482 |
| 18 June 2002 | South Korea | 2–1 (a.e.t.) | Italy | Round of 16 | 38,588 |

== See also ==
- List of football stadiums in South Korea
- List of association football stadiums by capacity
- Lists of stadiums
