= Daejeon Metro Line 1 =

Subway line in Daejeon, South Korea

Line 1
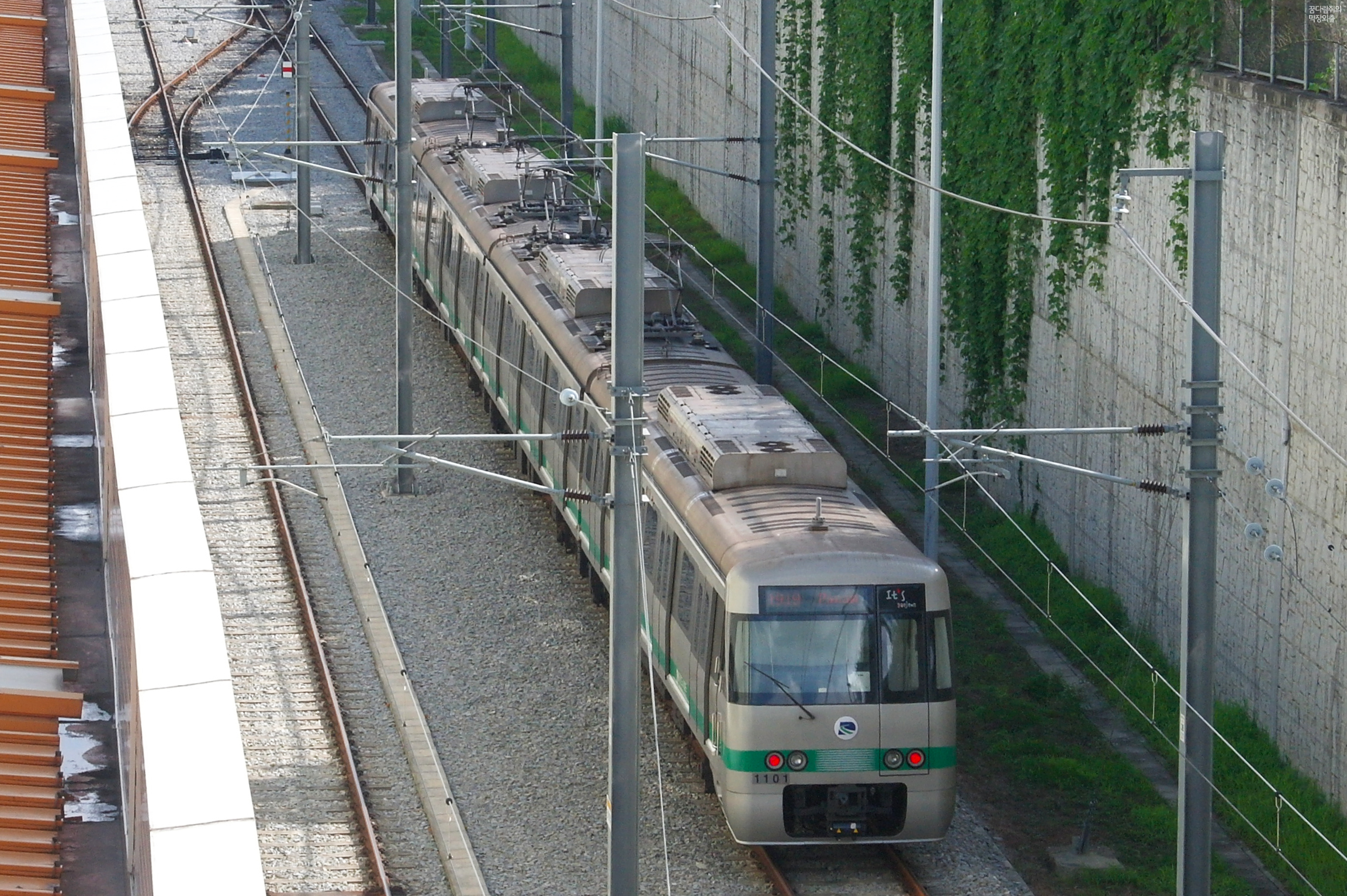

Overview
- Native name: 1호선(1號線); Il Hoseon
- Status: Operational
- Owner: City of Daejeon
- Locale: Daejeon, Sejong City (from 2029)
- Stations: 22

Service
- Type: Rapid transit
- System: Daejeon Metro
- Services: 1
- Operator: Daejeon Metropolitan Express Transit Corporation

History
- Opened: 16 March 2006; 20 years ago
- Last extension: 2007

Technical
- Line length: 22.74 kilometres (14.13 mi)

Daejeon Subway Line 1 is a subway line is located in Daejeon, South Korea. After excluding the Seoul metropolitan area, it was the fourth subway line created in South Korea, following Busan, Daegu, and Gwangju. Its line color is ● green. It is 22.6 km (14.0 mi) long with 22 stations. It is the first of five planned lines for the Daejeon Metro.

The first section was opened on March 16, 2006, and the second subsequently opened on April 17, 2007. The tracks lead from Banseok station in Yuseong-gu to Panam station in Dong-gu. 2029 is the tentative opening date of a 14-kilometre (8.7 mi), five-station extension from Banseok to Government Complex Sejong in the neighbouring Sejong City.

== Formation ==
In 1991, the Daejeon Metropolitan City Urban Railway Construction Plan was established. In January 1994, the Subway Planning Unit was established. In February 1996, the basic plan for subway construction, which links the old city center of Daejeon metropolitan city with the new city center, was confirmed. The subway construction headquarters was established in April 1996, and construction of the first line of Daejeon subway line was started in October of the same year.

== Stations ==
Station Number	Station Name			Connections	Distance	Location	
Station Number	English	Hangul	Hanja	Connections	km	Location	
100	Sikjangsan	식장산	食藏山		-2.4	Daejeon	Dong (East)
101	Panam	판암 (대전대)	板岩 (大田大)		0.00	Daejeon	Dong (East)
102	Sinheung	신흥	新興		0.94	Daejeon	Dong (East)
103	Dae-dong	대동 (우송대)	大洞 (又松大)	Daejeon Metro Line 2	2.16	Daejeon	Dong (East)
104	Daejeon Station	대전역	大田驛	Daejeon Metro Line 2 Chungcheong Metropolitan Railroad; Gyeongbu; Gyeongjeon; Gyeongbu HSR Mugunghwa-ho services	3.17	Daejeon	Dong (East)
105	Jungangno	중앙로	中央路		4.00	Daejeon	Jung (Centre)
106	Jung-gu District Office	중구청	中區廳		4.70	Daejeon	Jung (Centre)
107	Seodaejeon Negeori(Jct.)	서대전네거리	西大田네거리	Daejeon Metro Line 2 Seodaejeon; Honam; Jeolla Mugunghwa-ho services	5.54	Daejeon	Jung (Centre)
108	Oryong	오룡	五龍		6.32	Daejeon	Jung (Centre)
123	Yongdu	용두역	龍頭	Chungcheong Metropolitan Railroad	7.02	Daejeon	Jung (Centre)
109	Yongmun	용문	龍汶		7.82	Daejeon	Seo (West)
110	Tanbang	탄방	炭坊		9.02	Daejeon	Seo (West)
111	City Hall	시청	市廳		9.77	Daejeon	Seo (West)
112	Government Complex, Daejeon	정부청사	政府廳舍	Daejeon Metro Line 2	10.76	Daejeon	Seo (West)
113	Galma	갈마	葛馬		11.51	Daejeon	Seo (West)
114	Wolpyeong	월평	月坪		12.26	Daejeon	Seo (West)
115	Gapcheon	갑천	甲川		13.30	Daejeon	Seo (West)
116	Yuseong Spa	유성온천	儒城溫泉	Daejeon Metro Line 2	14.59	Daejeon	Yuseong
117	Guam	구암	九岩		15.63	Daejeon	Yuseong
118	National Cemetery	현충원	顯忠院		16.47	Daejeon	Yuseong
119	World Cup Stadium	월드컵경기장	월드컵競技場		17.53	Daejeon	Yuseong
120	Noeun	노은	老隱		18.34	Daejeon	Yuseong
121	Jijok	지족	智足		19.49	Daejeon	Yuseong
122	Banseok	반석	盤石		20.47	Daejeon	Yuseong
125	Oesam	외삼	外三			Daejeon	Yuseong
126	Geumnam	금남	錦南			Sejong City	Geumnam-myeon, Sejong
127	Sejong Bus Terminal	세종터미널	世宗터미널			Sejong City	Daepyeong-dong
128	Naseong	나성	羅城			Sejong City	Naseong-dong
129	Government Complex Sejong	정부세종청사	政府世宗廳舍			Sejong City	Eojin-dong

== Rolling stock ==
The rolling stock 1000 series EMU for Line 1 were manufactured by Hyundai Rotem based on the Korean Standard Electric Train (한국형 표준전동차), a large electric train for technical testing of standard urban railway vehicle specifications developed from 1995 to 1999.

All trains were manufactured at Hyundai Rotem's Changwon plant. Trainsets 101 through 112 were intended for the first opening on March 16, 2006, and the supply of vehicles was completed between 2004 and 2005. Trainsets 113 through 121, the second batch, were intended for the second opening on April 17, 2007, and the supply of vehicles was completed by 2006.

== Gallery ==
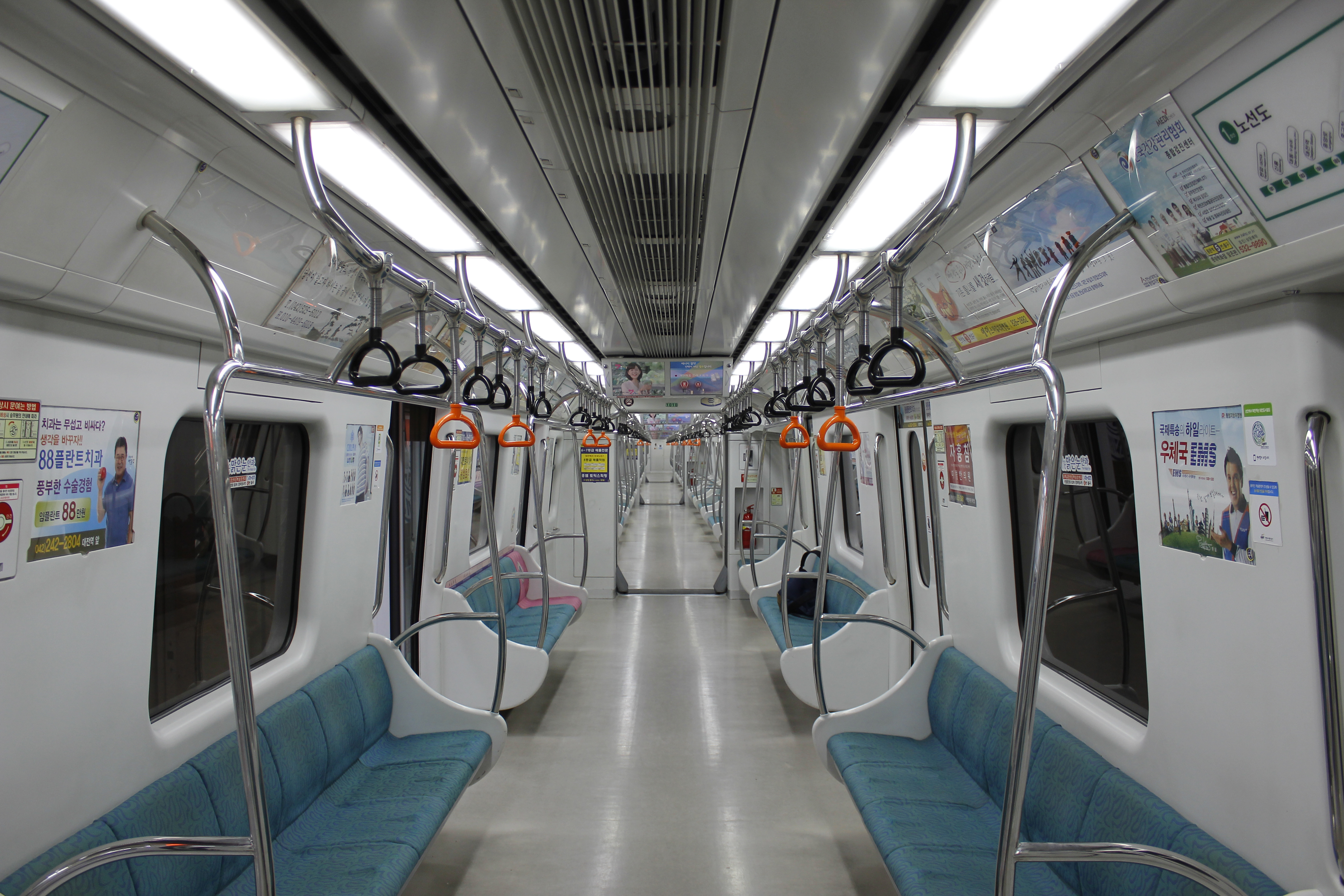
Interior of the 1000 series EMU

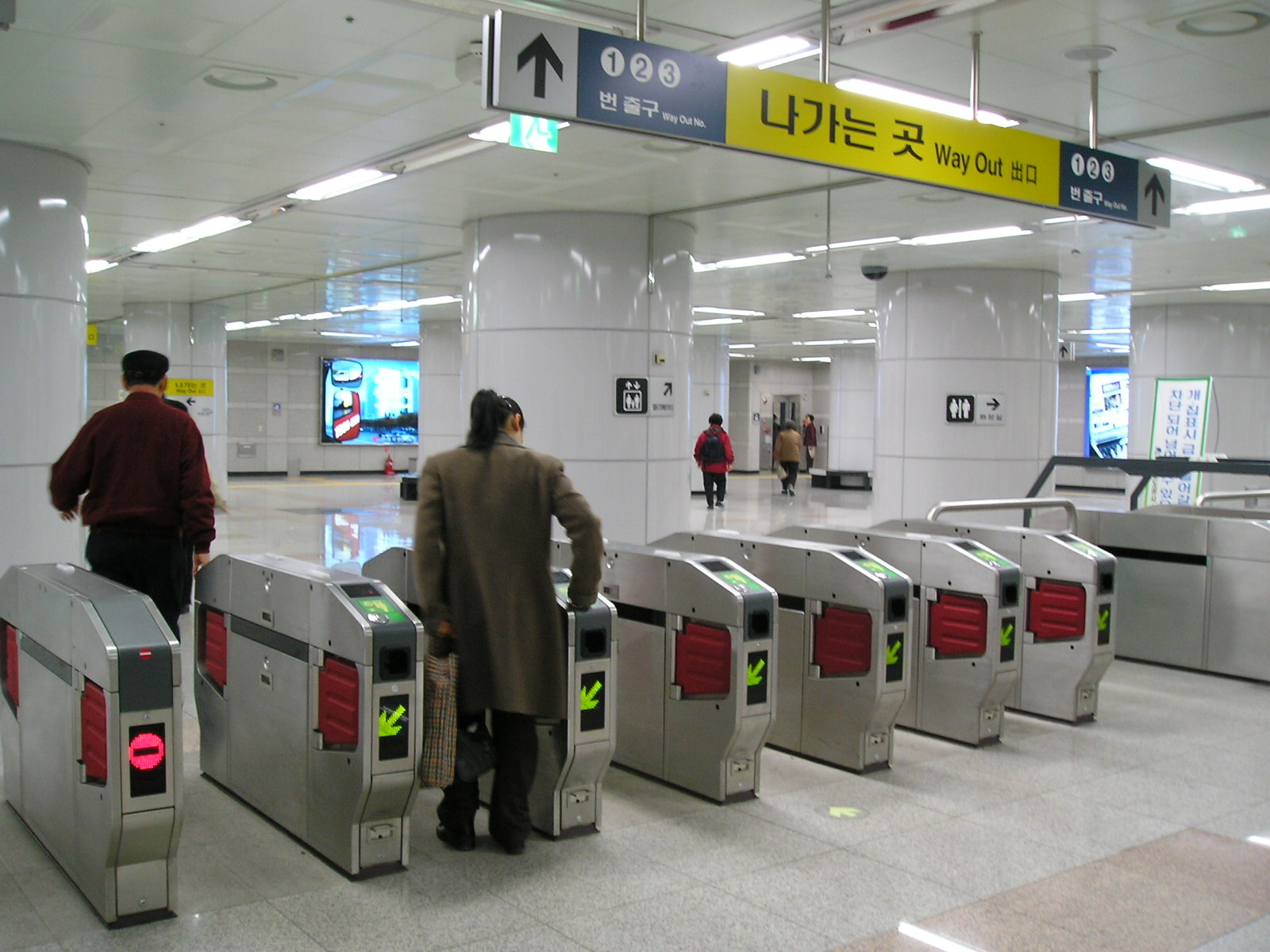
Tiket gate at Daejeon Station

== See also ==
- Transportation in South Korea
