= Jijok station =

Metro station in Daejeon, South Korea

121 지족 (침신대) Jijok (Chimsin Univ.)
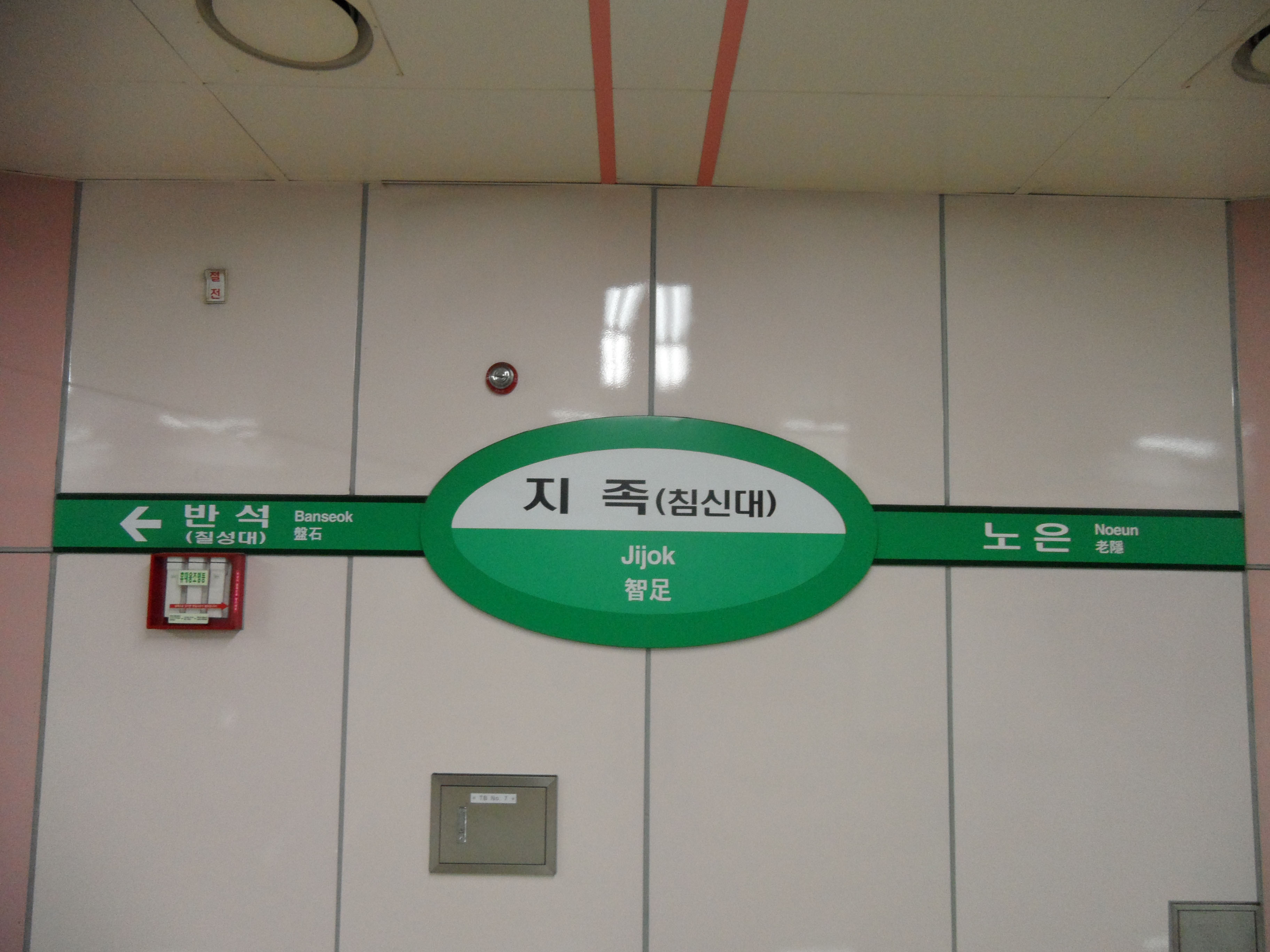

Korean name
- Hangul: 지족역
- Hanja: 智足驛
- Revised Romanization: Jijok yeok
- McCune–Reischauer: Chichok yŏk

General information
- Location: Jijok-dong, Yuseong District, Daejeon; South Korea
- Coordinates: 36°23′03″N 127°19′10″E
- Operator: Daejeon Metropolitan Express Transit Corporation
- Line: Daejeon Metro Line 1
- Platforms: 2
- Tracks: 2

Other information
- Station code: 121

History
- Opened: 17 April 2007; 19 years ago

Services
Preceding station	Daejeon Metro	Following station
Noeun towards Panam	Line 1	Banseok Terminus
Location

Jijok Station (Korean: 지족역; Hanja: 智足驛) is a station of Daejeon Metro Line 1 in Jijok-dong, Yuseong District, Daejeon, South Korea.
