= Jungangno station =

Jungangno station (Korean: 중앙로역) may refer to the following railroad stations in South Korea.

- Jungangno station (Daegu Metro), a station of Daegu Metro Line 1
- Jungangno station (Daejeon Metro), a station of Daejeon Metro Line 1
