= Government Complex, Daejeon station =

Metro station in Daejeon

112 정부청사 (신협중앙회) Government Complex, Daejeon (Credit Union)
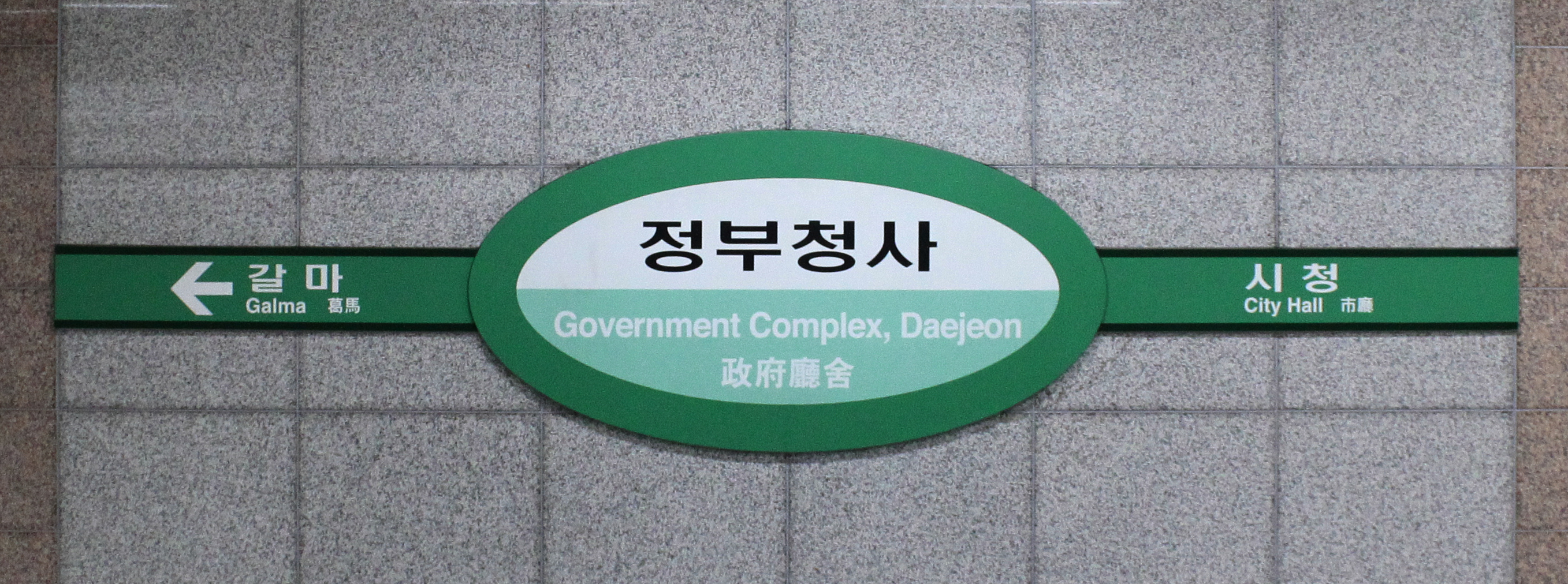
- Government Complex, Daejeon Station Sign(Before substation name notation)

Korean name
- Hangul: 정부청사역
- Hanja: 政府廳舍驛
- Revised Romanization: Jeongbucheongsa-yeok
- McCune–Reischauer: Chŏngbuch'ŏngsa-yŏk

General information
- Location: Dunsan-dong, Seo District, Daejeon; South Korea
- Coordinates: 36°21′28″N 127°22′52″E
- Operator: Daejeon Metropolitan Express Transit Corporation
- Line: Daejeon Metro Line 1
- Platforms: 2
- Tracks: 2

Other information
- Station code: 112

History
- Opened: March 16, 2006; 20 years ago

Services
Preceding station	Daejeon Metro	Following station
City Hall towards Panam	Line 1	Galma towards Banseok
Location

Government Complex, Daejeon station (Korean: 정부청사역; Hanja: 政府廳舍驛) is a station of the Daejeon Metro Line 1 in Dunsan-dong, Seo District, Daejeon, South Korea. It is located between City Hall Station and Kalma Station of Daejeon City Railway Line 1. It is 10.76 kilometres (6.69 mi) away from Panam. On the southern side of the station are the Bank of Korea, Eulji University Hospital, Seo-gu Office, and Sunmori Park. On the north side, there are Daejeon Government Building, Chungcheong Regional Statistical Office, Daejeon Government Complex Inter-City Bus Terminal, Dusan Seonja Site and Daejeon Regional Food and Drug Administration. There are also Boramae Crossing, Bukchung Crossing, Seokgung Crossing, and Prehistoric Crossing around government ministry.
