= Sinheung station =

Sinheung station (Korean: 신흥역; Hanja: 新興驛) may refer to these railway stations in South Korea:

- Sinheung station (Daejeon Metro), on Daejeon Metro Line 1
- Sinheung station (Seongnam), on Seoul Subway Line 8

== See also ==
- Sinhung station, a railway station in Sinhŭng County, North Korea
