= World Cup Stadium station (Daejeon Metro) =

Metro station in Daejeon, South Korea

119 월드컵경기장 (노은도매시장) World Cup Stadium (Noeun Wholesale Market)
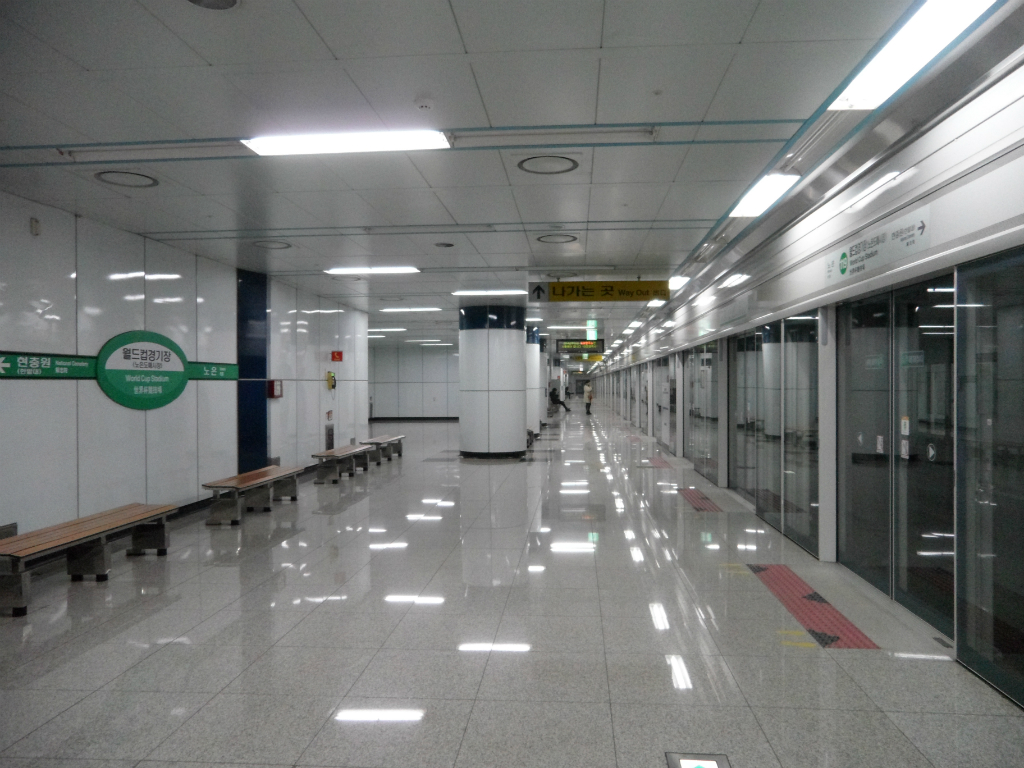

Korean name
- Hangul: 월드컵경기장역
- Hanja: 월드컵競技場驛
- Revised Romanization: Woldeukeop gyeonggijang yeok
- McCune–Reischauer: Wŏldŭk'ŏp kyŏnggijang yŏk

General information
- Location: Noeun-dong, Yuseong District, Daejeon; South Korea
- Coordinates: 36°22′01″N 127°19′04″E
- Operator: Daejeon Metropolitan Express Transit Corporation
- Line: Daejeon Metro Line 1
- Platforms: 2
- Tracks: 2

Other information
- Station code: 119

History
- Opened: April 17, 2007; 19 years ago

Services
Preceding station	Daejeon Metro	Following station
National Cemetery towards Panam	Line 1	Noeun towards Banseok
Location

World Cup Stadium Station (Korean: 월드컵경기장역; Hanja: 월드컵競技場驛) is a station of Daejeon Metro Line 1 in Noeun-dong, Yuseong District, Daejeon, South Korea.
