= 갈마역 =

갈마역 may refer to stations:

- Galma station (葛馬驛), station of the Daejeon Metro
- Kalma station (葛麻驛), railway station in Kalma-dong, Wŏnsan city, Kangwŏn province, North Korea
