= Yongmun station =

Yongmun station (Korean: 용문역) are railroad stations in South Korea.

- Yongmun station (Yangpyeong)
- Yongmun station (Daejeon Metro)
