= World Cup Stadium station =

World Cup Stadium station (Korean: 월드컵경기장역) is a railroad station in South Korea.

- World Cup Stadium station (Seoul)
- World Cup Stadium station (Daejeon Metro)
