= Sinheung station (Daejeon Metro) =

Metro station in Daejeon

102 신흥 Sinheung

Korean name
- Hangul: 신흥역
- Hanja: 新興驛
- Revised Romanization: Sinheung yeok
- McCune–Reischauer: Sinhŭng yŏk

General information
- Location: Panam-dong, Dong District, Daejeon; South Korea
- Coordinates: 36°19′11″N 127°26′56″E
- Operator: Daejeon Metropolitan Express Transit Corporation
- Line: Line 1
- Platforms: 2
- Tracks: 2

Construction
- Structure type: Underground

Other information
- Station code: 102

History
- Opened: 16 March 2006; 20 years ago

Services
Preceding station	Daejeon Metro	Following station
Panam Terminus	Line 1	Dae-dong towards Banseok
Location

Sinheung Station (Korean: 신흥역; Hanja: 新興驛) is a station of the Daejeon Metro Line 1 in Panam-dong, Dong District, Daejeon, South Korea.

== Station Layout ==
G	Street level	Exit

L1; Concourse	Lobby	Customer Service, Shops, Vending machines, ATMs

L2; Platforms	Side platform, doors will open on the right
L2; Platforms	Northbound	→ Line 1 toward Banseok (Dae-dong)→
L2; Platforms	Southbound	← Line 1 toward Panam (Terminus)
L2; Platforms	Side platform, doors will open on the right
