= Daejeon Hanbat Arboretum =

Arboretum in Daejeon, South Korea

Coordinates: 36°22′09″N 127°23′17″E

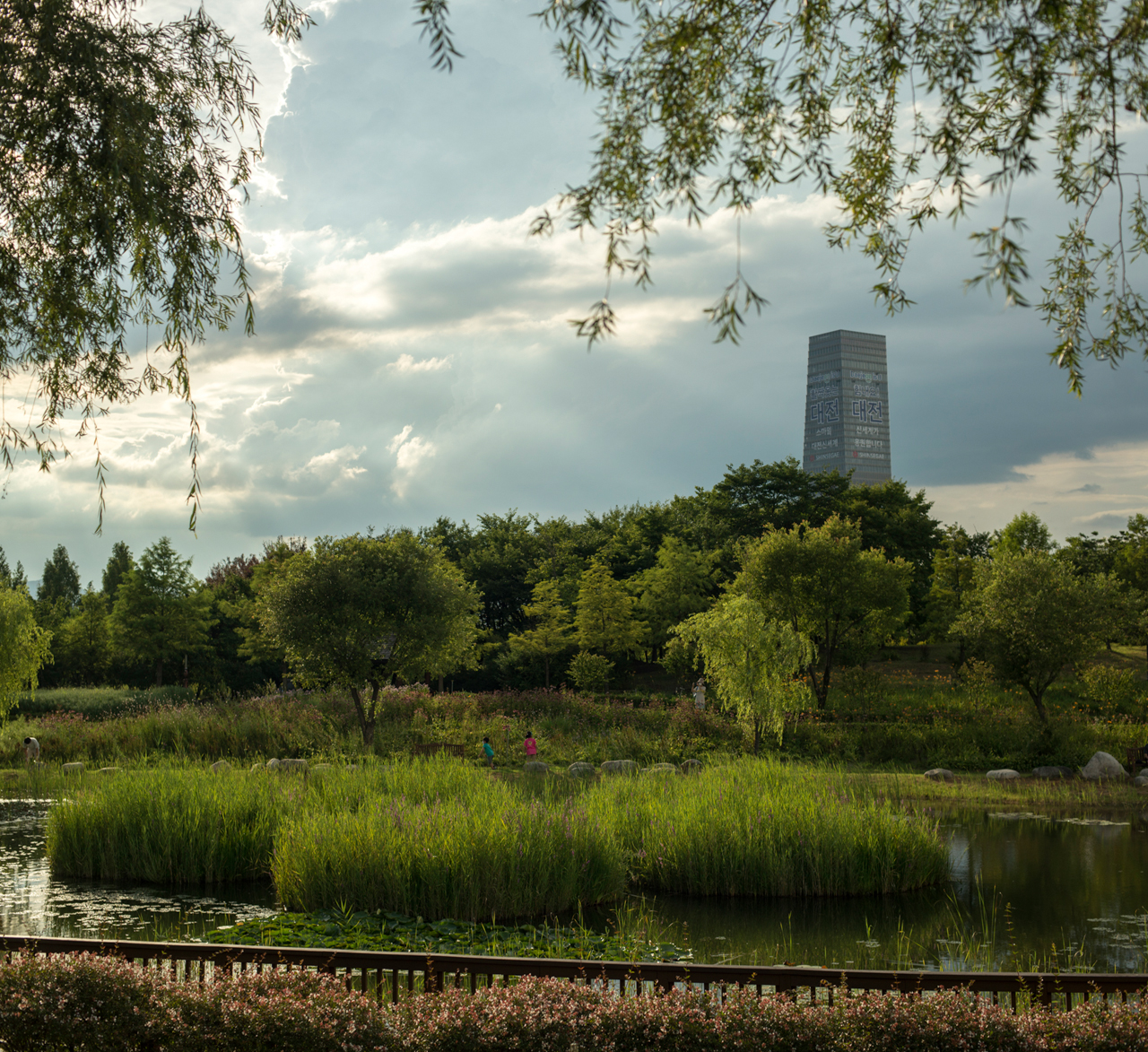
Northern end of the lake in the East Garden at Daejeon Hanbat Arboretum.

Daejeon Hanbat Arboretum (Korean: 한밭수목원; Hanja: 한밭樹木園) is an urban park and arboretum in Daejeon Metropolitan City, located in Seo District at the confluence of the Yuseongcheon and Gap rivers. Covering 387,000 sq/m (96 acres), it is the largest manmade urban arboretum in Korea, and one of the most popular attractions in Daejeon, with nearly 1 million annual visitors. The park is home to 1,787 plant species, including more than 1,100 species of trees and shrubs.

The park is laid out thematically, with the West Garden reflecting the character and biodiversity of local mountains and forests, and the East Garden highlighting more exotic or non-native plant species, as well as hosting education and research facilities.

The nearest metro station (located 1.5km to the south) is Government Complex Daejeon on Line 1, and multiple city bus routes stop at the Arboretum entrance. Major cycling routes along the river trail system also offer direct access to the arboretum via the Gap river. The park has seasonal opening hours, and there is no admission fee.

== History ==
Following the Taejon Expo 93, there was a question of how to develop the large area that had been dedicated to parking lots for the exposition. After a long period of planning, including a decade of cultivating appropriate plants in multiple city nurseries, construction on the arboretum began in 2001. Construction proceeded in phases, with the West Garden opening in 2005, and the East Garden and Tropical Botanical Garden opening in 2009 and 2011, respectively.

== Gallery ==
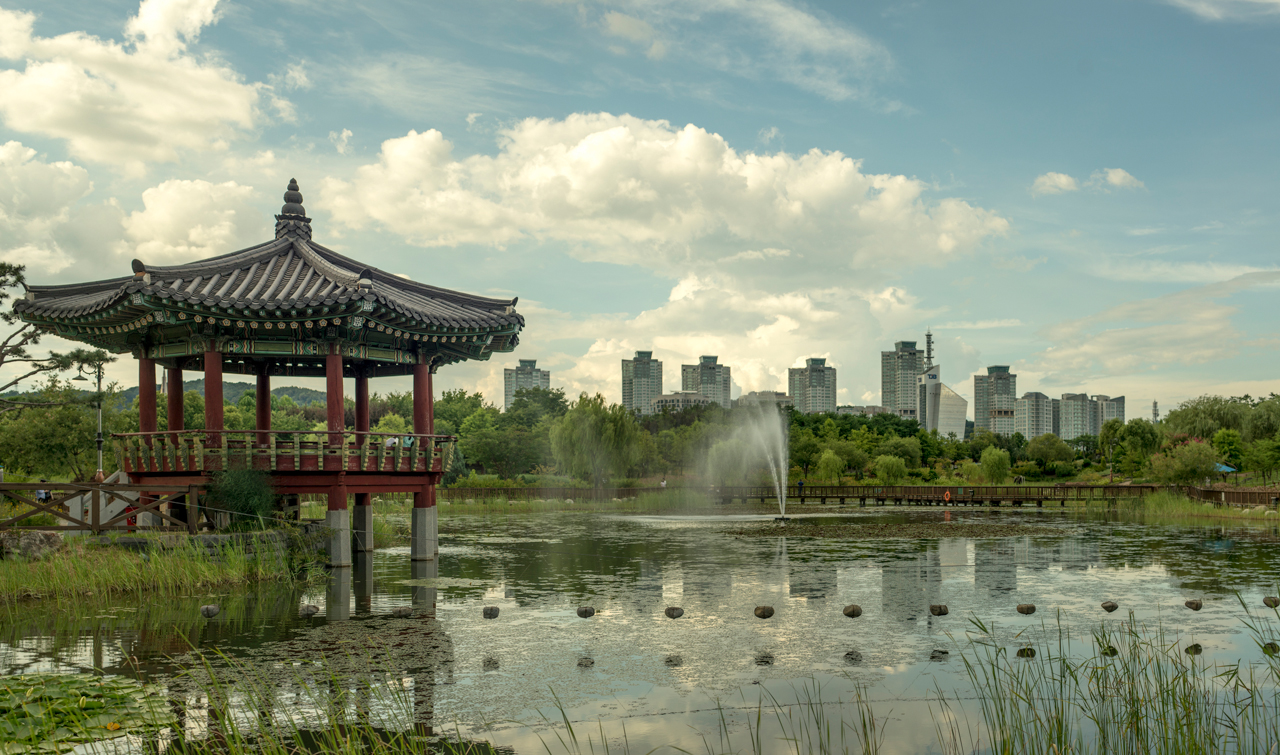
The lake and pagoda in the East Garden in 2021.

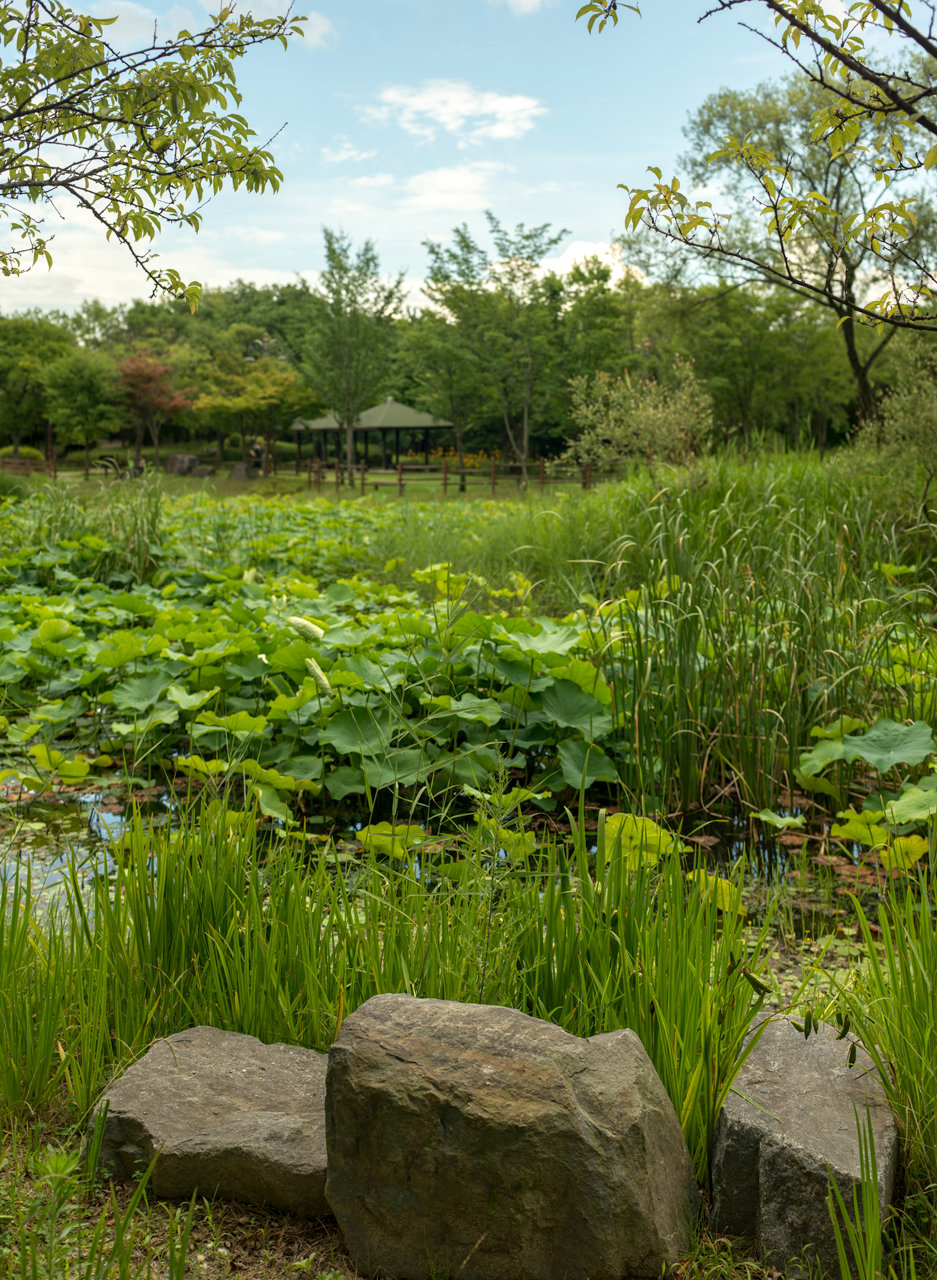
The lagoon/lake in the West Garden in 2021.

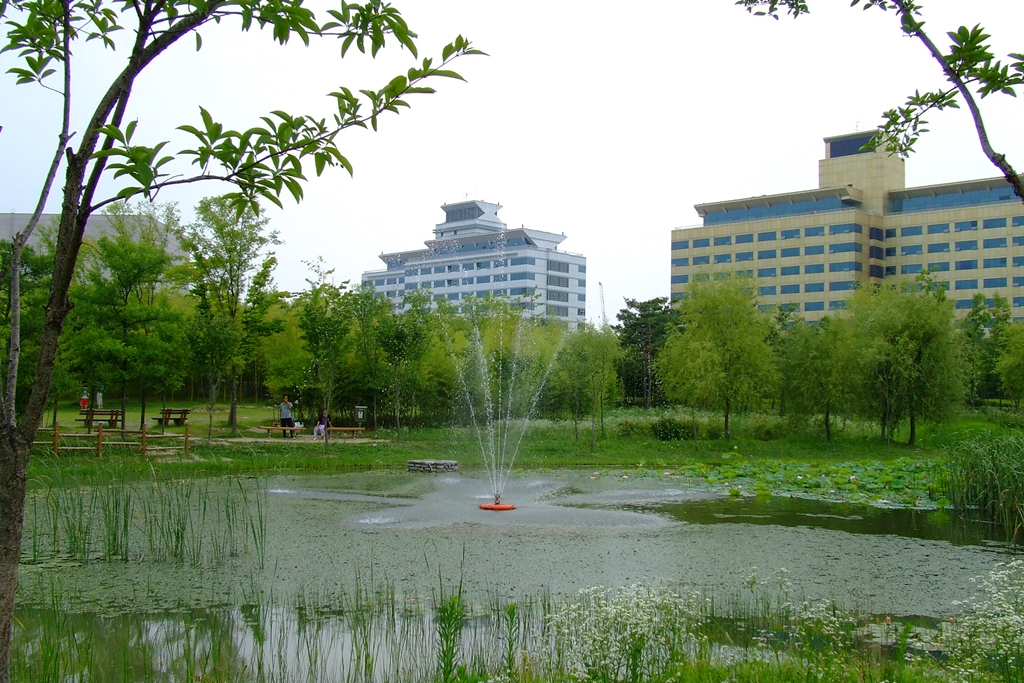
The lake in the West Garden in 2009.

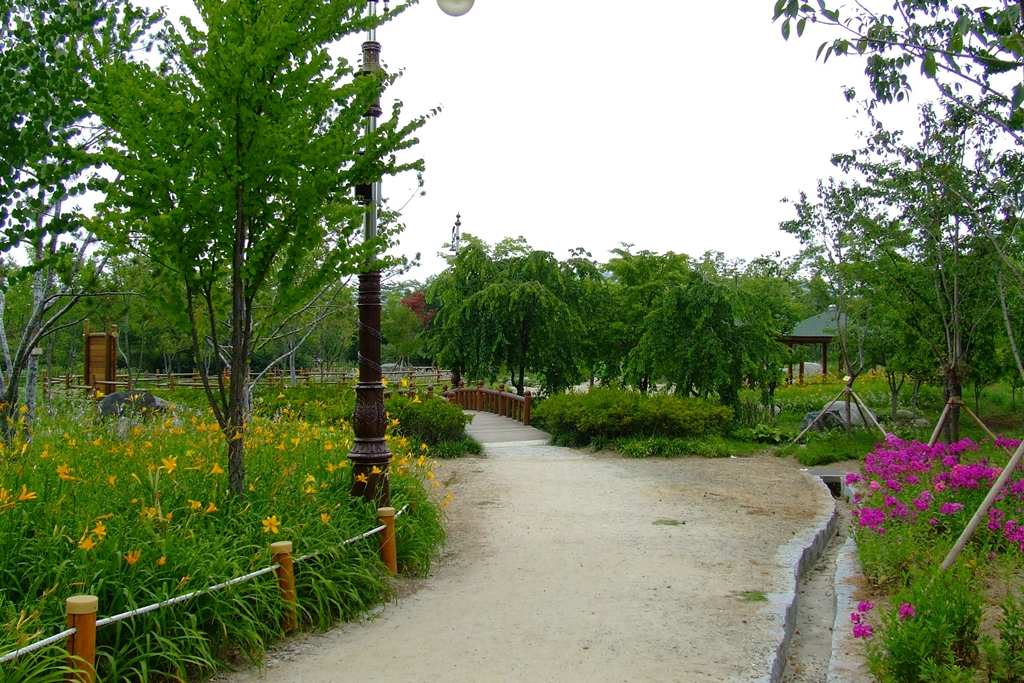
A path in the West Garden in 2009.
