= Jung District, Daejeon =

Coordinates: 36°19′26″N 127°25′15″E

Jung
- Autonomous District
- Eunhaeng-dong (2008)

- Flag

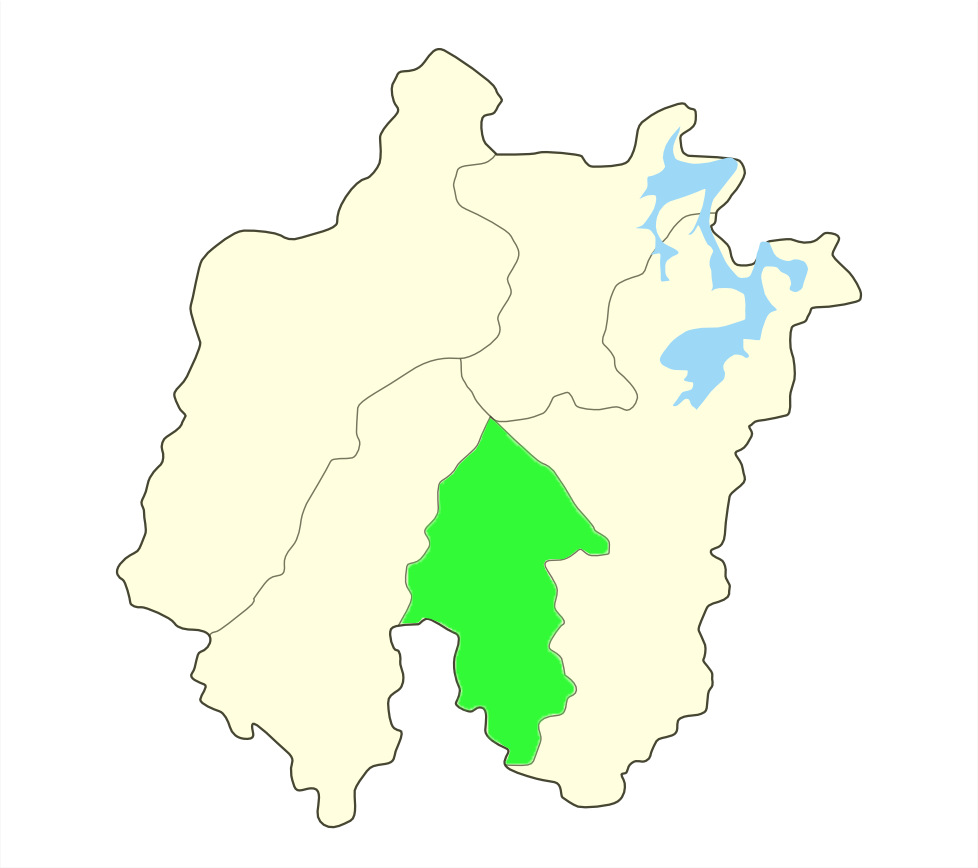
- Country: South Korea
- Region: Hoseo
- Provincial level: Daejeon
- Administrative divisions: 17 administrative dong

Area
  - Total: 62 km^{2} (24 sq mi)

Population
  - Total: 265,467
  - Density: 4,300/km^{2} (11,000/sq mi)
  - Dialect: Chungcheong
- Website: District Office

Korean name
- Hangul: 중구
- Hanja: 中區
- RR: Jung-gu
- MR: Chung-gu

Jung District (Korean: 중구) is a gu in southern central Daejeon, South Korea. The population is 227,108 as of 2022. It consists of 17 branches including Sunhwa-dong, Mokdong, Jungchon-dong, Daeheung-dong, Munchang-dong, Seokgyodong, Daesa-dong, Bussa-dong, Sanseong-dong, Yongdu-dong, Yudong-dong, Taepyeong 1 ~ 2 dong, Yucheon 1 ~ 2 dong and Culture 1 ~ 2 dong. The location of the ward office is in Daeheung-dong, Jung-gu.

== Cultural Heritage ==
There is the Bomunsan Mountain, Bomunsanji, and Bomunsan Mae Aeae.

== Sister Cities ==
Malabon, Philippines
