= Seo District, Daejeon =

Coordinates: 36.35°N 127.38°E

Seo
- Autonomous District
- Daejeon City Hall and nearby Dunsan area

- Flag

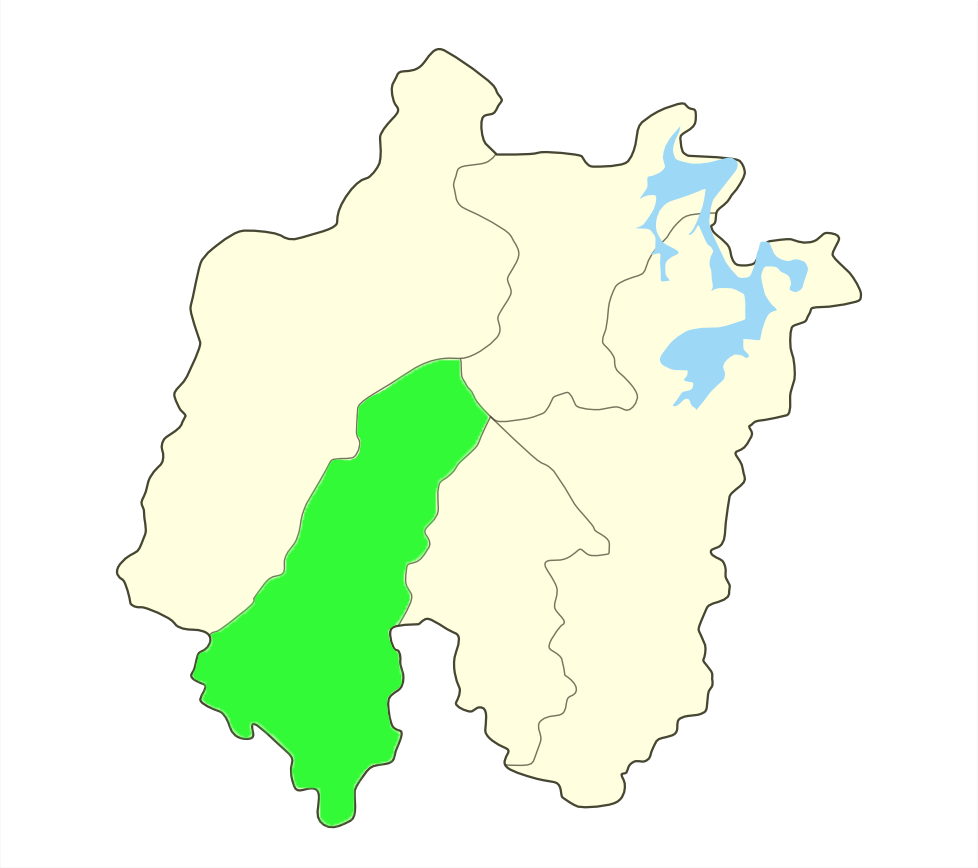
- Country: South Korea
- Region: Hoseo
- Provincial level: Daejeon
- Administrative divisions: 23 administrative dong

Government
  - Mayor: Jeon Mun-hak (Democratic)

Area
  - Total: 95.25 km^{2} (36.78 sq mi)

Population (2024)
  - Total: 458,903
  - Density: 4,818/km^{2} (12,480/sq mi)
  - Dialect: Chungcheong
- Website: Seo District Office

Korean name
- Hangul: 서구
- Hanja: 西區
- RR: Seo-gu
- MR: Sŏ-gu

Seo District (Korean: 서구) is a gu ("district") of Daejeon, South Korea. Daejeon Metropolitan City Hall is also located there. This is a self-governing district located in the southwestern part of Daejeon Metropolitan City. It serves as the central hub of the city, hosting several major developments such as Dunsan New Town, Gwanjeo District, and Doan New Town. With a population of approximately 470,000, it is the most populous district in Daejeon, accounting for about one-third of the city's total population.

== Administrative divisions ==
Seo-gu is divided into 14 dong (동, "neighborhoods"):

- Gasuwon-dong
- Gwanjeo-dong
- Giseong-dong
- Wolpyeong-dong
- Nae-dong
- Gajang-dong
- Goejeong-dong
- Dunsan-dong
- Sancheon-dong
- Tanbang-dong
- Yongmun-dong
- Byeon-dong
- Boksu-dong
- Doma-dong

== Places of interest ==
Dunsan-dong is one of the more densely populated areas of Daejeon. As a result, it is the location of several points of interest. These include department stores, government offices, and several international chain restaurants and retailers. There is Pai Chai University in Seo District, Daejeon. There is also Hanbat Arboretum. There is also the "Cafe Wave". There is an Art Center. Jangtae Recreational Forest is located in the district.

Also, Daejeon Arts Center, a representative general concert hall in Daejeon, is also located in Seo-gu.

== Education ==
=== Higher Education ===
- Korea Advanced Institute of Science and Technology(KAIST)
- Daejeon Institute of Science and Technology
- Mokwon University
- PAI CHAI University

=== High School ===
- Daejeon Foreign Language High School
- Daejeon Gwanjeo High School
- Seoil High School
- CHUNGNAM HIGH SCHOOL
- Seodaejeon High School

=== Middle School ===
- Gasuwon Middle School
- DAEJEON DAESHIN MIDDLE SCHOOL

== See also ==
- Daejeon Gwanjeo High School
