= Panam station =

Metro station in Daejeon, South Korea

101 판암 (대전대) Panam (Daejeon Univ.)
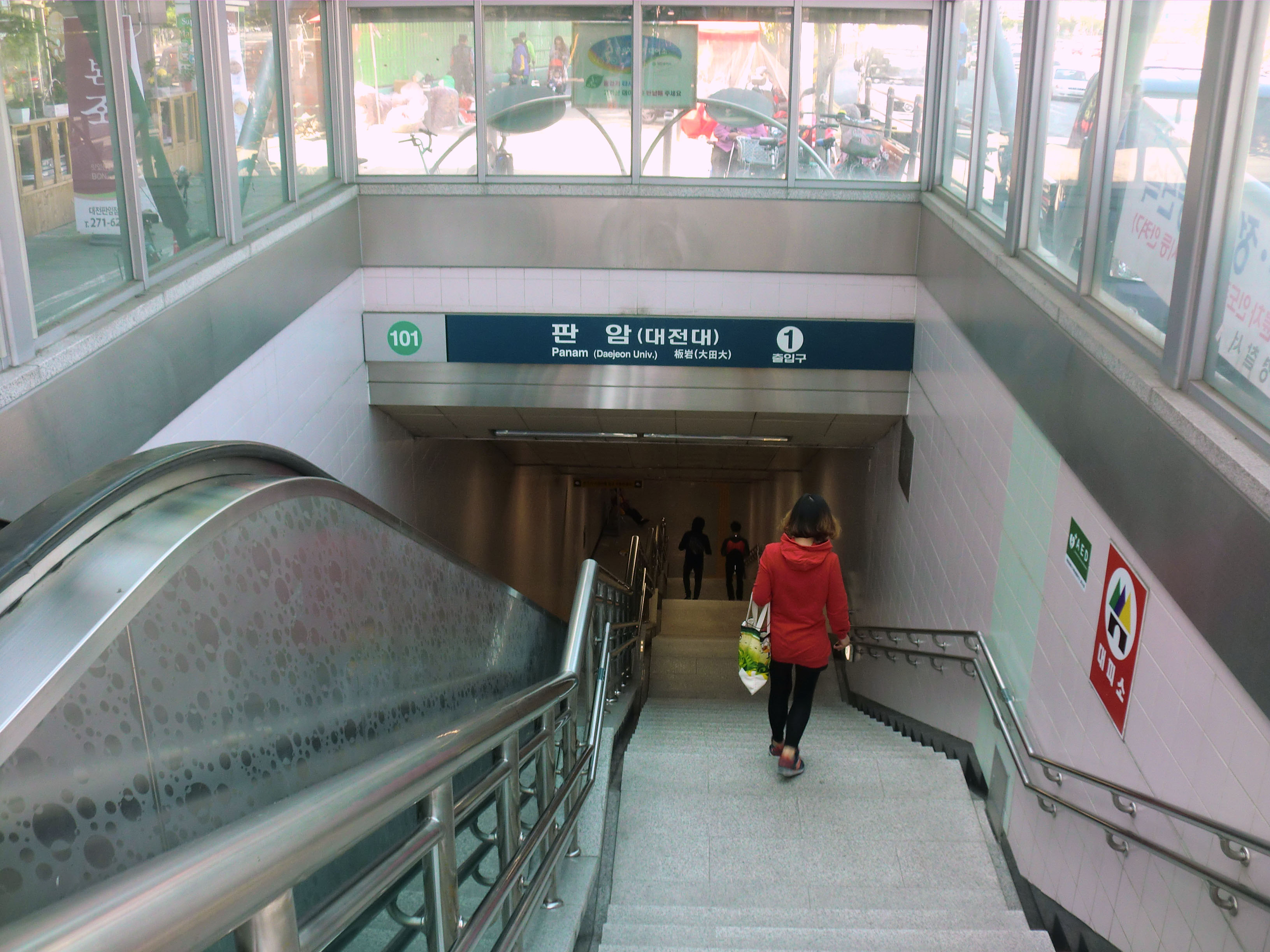

Korean name
- Hangul: 판암역
- Hanja: 板岩驛
- Revised Romanization: Panam yeok
- McCune–Reischauer: P'anam yŏk

General information
- Location: Panam-dong, Dong District, Daejeon; South Korea
- Coordinates: 36°19′01″N 127°27′30″E
- Operator: Daejeon Metropolitan Express Transit Corporation
- Line: Daejeon Metro Line 1
- Platforms: 2
- Tracks: 3

Construction
- Structure type: Underground

Other information
- Station code: 101

History
- Opened: 16 March 2006; 20 years ago

Services
Preceding station	Daejeon Metro	Following station
Terminus	Line 1	Sinheung towards Banseok
Location

Panam Station (Korean: 판암역; Hanja: 板岩驛) is the eastern terminus of Daejeon Metro Line 1 in Panam-dong, Dong District, Daejeon, South Korea. It is station number 101 on the line. The station's subtitle, Daejeon Univ., refers to the nearby Daejeon University.

== History ==
Panam Station opened on 16 March 2006 as part of the first phase of Daejeon Metro Line 1, which connected Panam with Government Complex Daejeon over 12.4 kilometres (7.7 mi) with 12 stations. Construction of Line 1 had begun in October 1996 and was originally scheduled for completion by 2003, but was delayed by right-of-way acquisition difficulties and constrained finances following the 1997 Asian financial crisis. The second phase of the line, extending westward from Government Complex Daejeon to Banseok, opened on 17 April 2007.

== Station layout ==
Panam is an underground station with two platforms and three tracks. As the eastern terminus of the line, the station is adjacent to the Panam Depot, the vehicle maintenance and storage base for Daejeon Metro Line 1.

== Future extension ==
In December 2022, Daejeon Metropolitan City announced a plan to extend Line 1 by one stop beyond Panam, with a new station tentatively named Sikjangsan Station. The station would be built within the grounds of the Panam Depot at an estimated cost of approximately 15 billion won. The extension was originally targeted for completion by the end of 2025, but in March 2024 the opening was postponed to the end of 2026 due to the need for an urban management plan change to lift development restrictions on the depot site.

== Surroundings ==
The station is located along National Route 4, which passes through the centre of Daejeon. To the east, the Panam Interchange provides access to the Tongyeong–Daejeon Expressway. Nearby landmarks include Daejeon University, Dongshin Middle School, Panam Neighbourhood Park, and the Dong District office.
