= Banseok station =

Metro station in Daejeon, South Korea

122 반석 (칠성대) Banseok (Chilsungsdae)
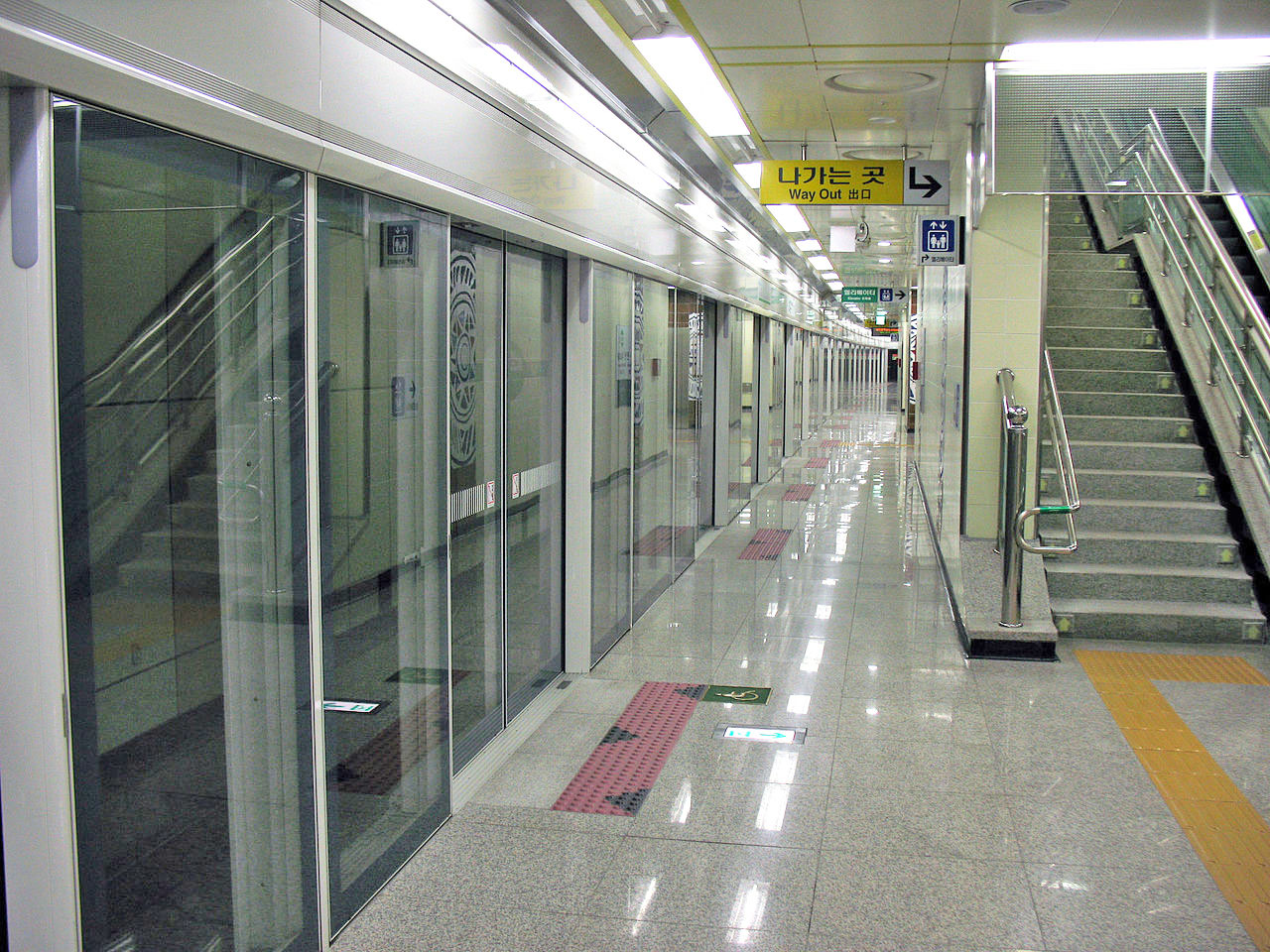

Korean name
- Hangul: 반석역
- Hanja: 盤石驛
- Revised Romanization: Banseok-yeok
- McCune–Reischauer: Pansŏk-yŏk

General information
- Location: Banseok-dong, Yuseong District, Daejeon; South Korea
- Coordinates: 36°23′32″N 127°18′52″E
- Operator: Daejeon Metropolitan Express Transit Corporation
- Line: Daejeon Metro Line 1
- Platforms: 2
- Tracks: 3

Other information
- Station code: 122

History
- Opened: 17 April 2007; 19 years ago

Services
Preceding station	Daejeon Metro	Following station
Jijok towards Panam	Line 1	Terminus
Location

Banseok station (Korean: 반석역; Hanja: 盤石驛) is a station of the Daejeon Metro Line 1 in Banseok-dong, Yuseong District, Daejeon, South Korea.
