= Daejeon Metro =

Rapid transit system in Daejeon, South Korea

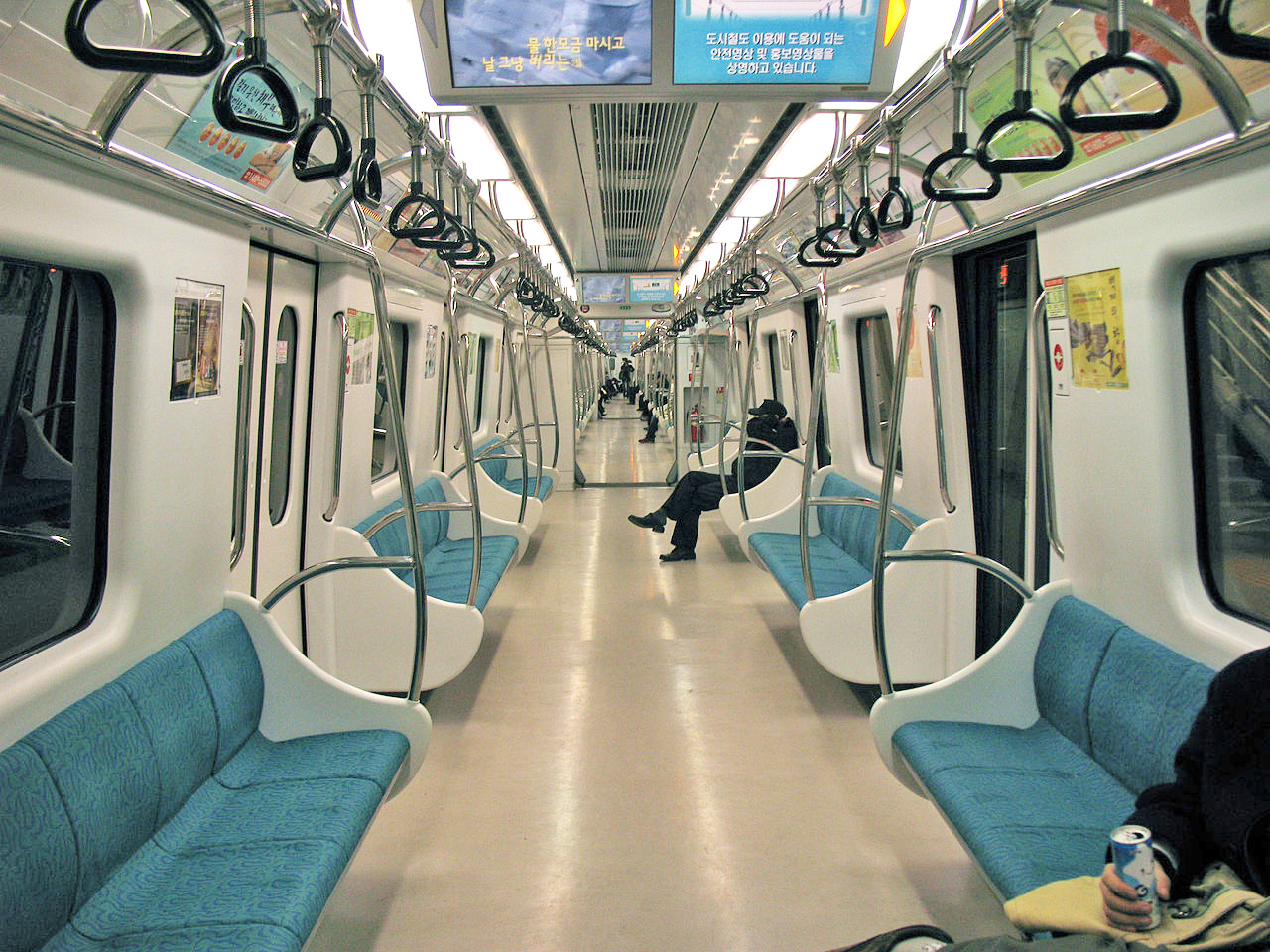

Overview
- Native name: 대전 도시철도
- Locale: Daejeon, South Korea
- Transit type: Rapid transit
- Number of lines: 1
- Number of stations: 22
- Daily ridership: 110,307 (2019)
- Annual ridership: 40,262,211 (2019)
- Website: https://www.djtc.kr/eng/index.do

Operation
- Began operation: 16 March 2006; 20 years ago
- Operator: Daejeon Metropolitan Express Transit Corporation
- Number of vehicles: Hyundai Rotem Metro cars

Technical
- System length: 22.74 km (14.13 mi)
- Track gauge: 1,435 mm (4 ft 8 1/2 in)
System map

- Daejeon Metro
- Hangul: 대전 도시철도
- Hanja: 大田都市鐵道
- RR: Daejeon dosi cheoldo
- MR: Taejŏn tosi ch'ŏlto

Daejeon Metro (Korean: 대전 도시철도) is the rapid transit system of Daejeon, South Korea, operated by the Daejeon Metropolitan Express Transit Corporation (DjeT, or Daejeon Metro). The single-line subway network first opened in 2006 with 12 stations. The line was expanded in 2007 and it now consists of one line, 22 operating stations, and 22.74 kilometres (14.13 mi) of route.

== History ==
After the city's administrative district was expanded in 1995, plans were announced in February 1996 for a five-line metro service totaling 102.3 kilometres (63.6 mi). Construction of Line 1 began in October 1996 and was scheduled to be completed by 2003, but completion was delayed by right-of-way acquisition and constrained finances in the wake of the 1997 Asian financial crisis.

== Lines ==
Line		Termini		Stations	Length		Operation
Line 1		Panam	Banseok	22	22.7 km (14 mi)		2006—
Line 2	Main line	Seodaejeon		10	33.9 km (21 mi)	38.8 km (24 mi)	2030—
Line 2	Yeonchuk branch line	Yongjeon	Yeonchuk	4	3.9 km (2 mi)	38.8 km (24 mi)	2030—
Line 2	Jinjam branch line	Gwanjeonegeori	Jinjamnegeori	1	1.0 km (1 mi)	38.8 km (24 mi)	2030—
Chungcheong Metropolitan Railroad		Gyeryong	Sintanjin	12	35.4 km (22 mi)		2029—

=== Line 1 ===
Line 1 was initially designed to be 22.6 kilometres (14.0 mi) long, connecting the old and new town centers. It opened in two phases and a third is planned:

- 16 March 2006: Line 1 Phase 1 opened (Panam ↔ Government Complex)
- 17 April 2007: Line 1 Phase 2 complete, fully opened (Panam ↔ Banseok)
- 2029: Tentative opening date of extension from Banseok to Government Complex Sejong

The track leads from Banseok Station in Yuseong-gu to Panam Station in Dong-gu.

=== Line 2 ===
Line 2 has gone through a number of changes and proposals over the years, including making it a maglev modeled after the maglev in the National Science Museum. In 2015, a basic plan was established and the following year they announced the route, which included two demonstration routes that would later be connected, one in an urban area and one in a business area. It is currently under construction and is expected to open in 2028. Line 2 will be serviced as a tram.

=== Chungcheong Metropolitan Railroad ===
Chungcheong Metropolitan Railroad is planned to connect Chungcheongnam-do (Gyeryong-si, Nonsan-si), Chungcheongbuk-do (Okcheon-gun), and Sejong Special Self-Governing City with Daejeon Metropolitan City as the center. Services will be operated by Korail on the existing Gyeongbu Line(Sintanjin Station ~ Okcheon Station) and Honam Line(Ojeong Station ~ Ganggyeong Station).

In December 2023, the first phase (Gyeryong-Sintanjin) section began construction.

It is scheduled to open in 2027.

=== Daejeon-Sejong-Chungbuk Metropolitan Railway (CTX) ===
Daejeon-Sejong-Chungbuk Metropolitan Railway is planned to connect Daejeon, Sejong and Chungcheongbuk-do (Cheongju-si). It was originally planned to extend Daejeon Metro Line 1 to connect to Cheongju Airport via Banseok Station, Jochiwon Station, Osong Station, and downtown Cheongju. However, in January 2024, the existing plan was changed and separated into a completely new line (Chungcheong Train eXpress|CTX) connecting Daejeon Metro Line 1 Government Complex station to Cheongju Airport.

It is scheduled to open in 2034.

== Rolling stock ==
Line	Image	Manufacturer	Model	No.	Qty	Dates		Refs
Line	Image	Manufacturer	Model	No.	Qty	Ordered	Service	Refs
Line 1		Hyundai Rotem	Djet EMU-1000	101–112	21	2004–2005	2006	
Line 1		Hyundai Rotem	Djet EMU-1000	113–121	21	2006	2007	
Line 2		Hyundai Rotem	Djet EMU-2000	201–234	34	2027—	2030	

== See also ==
- Transportation in South Korea
- List of metro systems
