= List of Nippon Professional Baseball players to hit for the cycle =

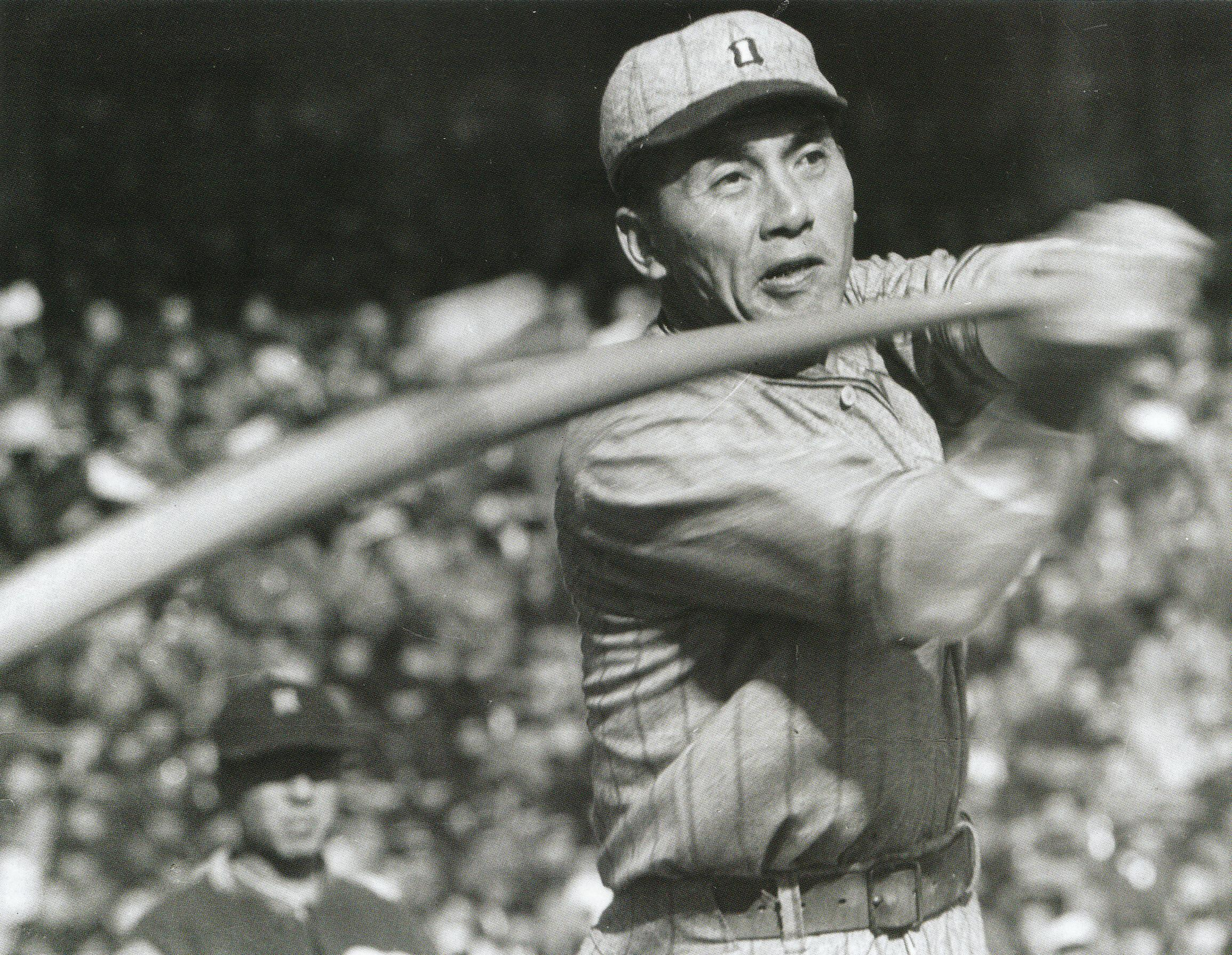
Fumio Fujimura was the first player in Nippon Professional Baseball history to hit for the cycle and also the first to hit multiple cycles.

In baseball, completing the cycle is the accomplishment of hitting a single, a double, a triple, and a home run in the same game. Collecting the hits in that order is known as a "natural cycle", which has occurred five times in Nippon Professional Baseball (NPB). The cycle itself is rare in NPB, occurring 76 times since Fumio Fujimura's first cycle during the single league era in 1948. In terms of frequency, the cycle is roughly as common as a no-hitter (90 occurrences in NPB history); Baseball Digest calls it "one of the rarest feats in baseball". Hitting for the cycle was not recognized in Japanese professional baseball until former Major League Baseball (MLB) player Daryl Spencer made a remark about it after hitting for the cycle with the Hankyu Braves in 1965. Of the 12 current NPB teams, only the Tohoku Rakuten Golden Eagles have never had at least one player hit for the cycle.

The most cycles hit by a player in Nippon Professional Baseball is three, accomplished by Bobby Rose. Playing for the Yokohama BayStars, Rose hit his first cycle on May 2, 1995, the next on April 29, 1997, and his final cycle on June 30, 1999. Other than Rose, only three other NPB players have hit multiple cycles: Fumio Fujimura with the Osaka Tigers and Hiromi Matsunaga with the Hankyu/Orix Braves and Kosuke Fukudome with the Chunichi Dragons and the Hanshin Tigers, all with two. Fujimura is also the only player to have hit a cycle during both the single league era and the current dual league era. The 2003 NPB season saw the most cycles hit in a single season—five. That season also saw the only instance of cycles occurring in two different games on the same day: on July 1, hit by Atsunori Inaba of the Yakult Swallows and Arihito Muramatsu of the Fukuoka Daiei Hawks. The next day, Shinjiro Hiyama became the third player to hit for the cycle in two days. Conversely, the longest period of time between two players hitting for the cycle is one day shy of 6 years. The drought has lasted from Michihiro Ogasawara's cycle in 2008 until Rainel Rosario's in 2014.

No player has ever hit a cycle in both the Central and Pacific Leagues; however, after Alex Ochoa hit his cycle with the Dragons on April 13, 2004, he became the only player to hit a cycle in both MLB and NPB. Ochoa hit his first and only cycle in the MLB eight years prior on July 3, 1996, while playing for the New York Mets. Swallows catcher Atsuya Furuta is the only player to hit for the cycle in an NPB All-Star game, hitting one in game 2 of the 1992 series. Furuta's cycle is not considered an official NPB cycle as it occurred during an exhibition game. Inaba is the only player to hit for the cycle in a rain-shortened game. After hitting a triple in the first inning and hitting a home run in the fourth, Inaba collected the other two necessary hits in a seven-run fifth inning when the order batted around. Six players achieved their cycles by acquiring a required hit during extra innings. Kosuke Fukudome is the only player to have hit a grand slam as the home run of the cycle. Hiroshi Ohshita and Kazuhiko Kondo are the only two players to have hit a walk-off home run to win the game as the final hit of their cycles.

== Cycles by player ==
Key to symbols in player table
†	Inducted into the Japanese Baseball Hall of Fame and Museum
*	Denotes a natural cycle
§	Indicates that a hit required for the cycle was acquired during extra innings
(x)	Number of cycles recorded to that point (if the player recorded more than one)

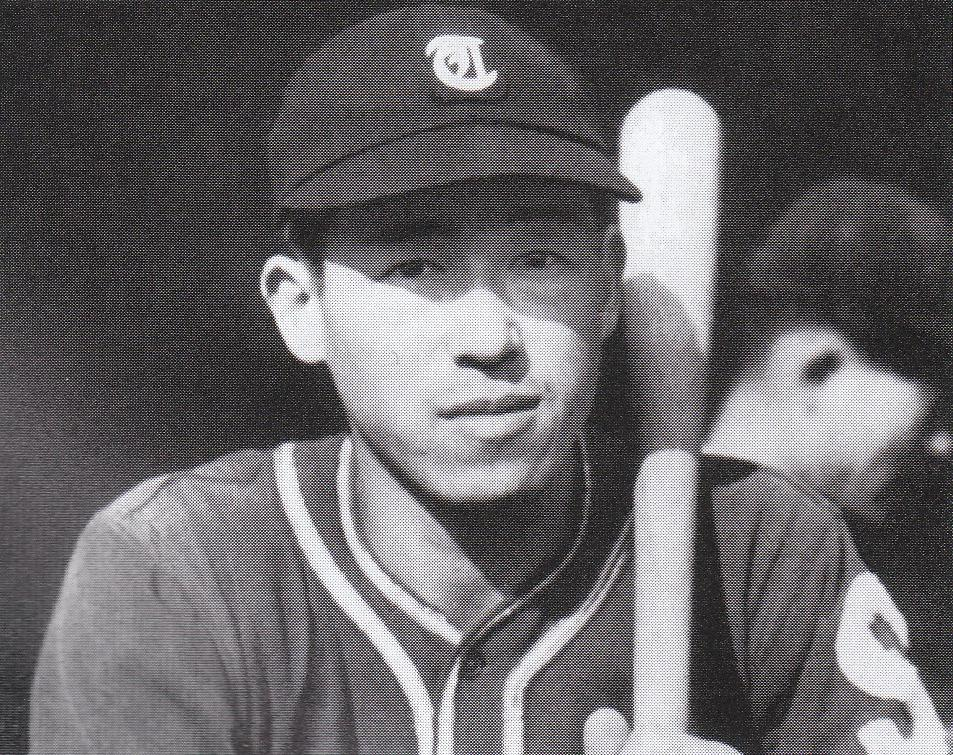
Hiroshi Ohshita's cycle was the first to be completed with a walk-off home run in Nippon Professional Baseball history.

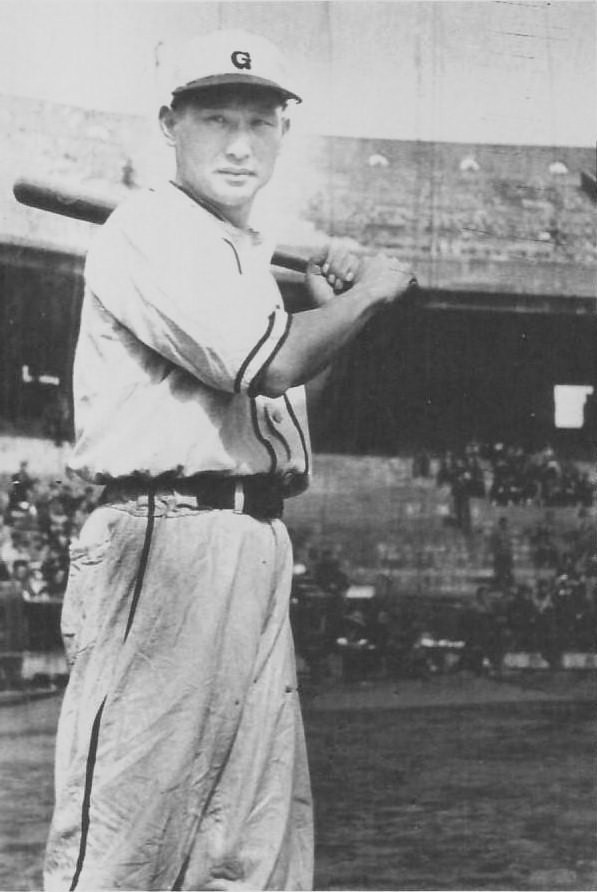
Tetsuharu Kawakami hit the first cycle in Yomiuri Giants' franchise history.

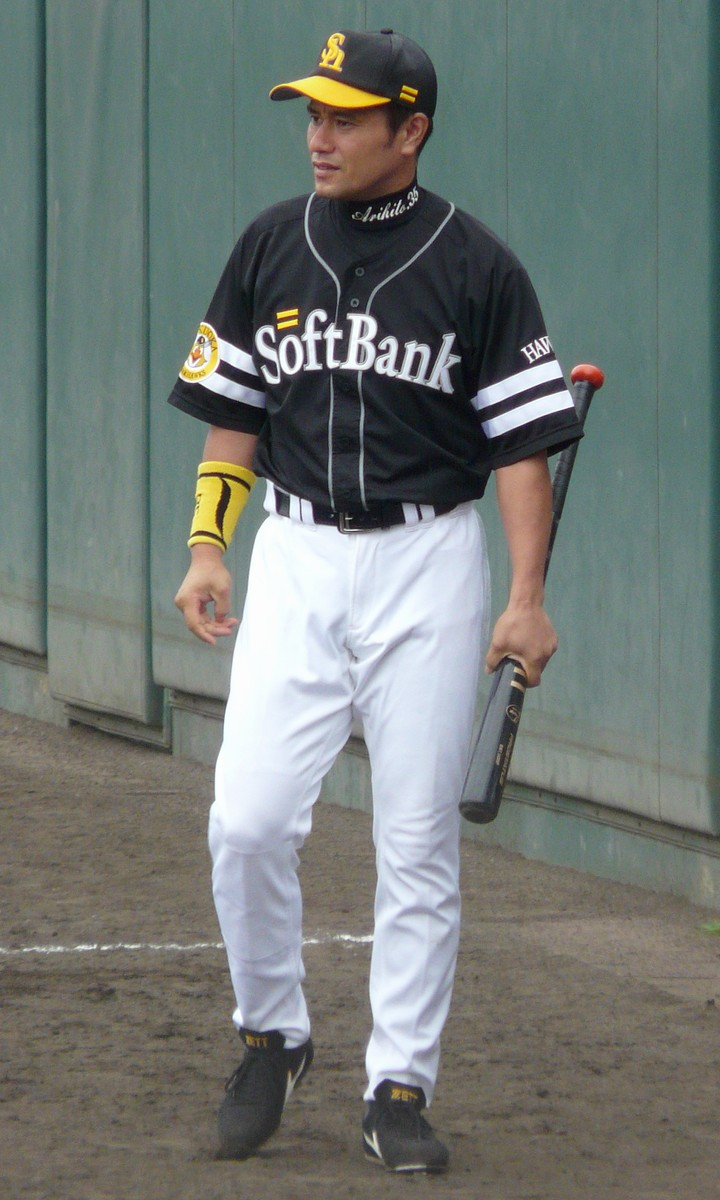
Arihito Muramatsu is one of only five players to hit for a natural cycle in Nippon Professional Baseball history.

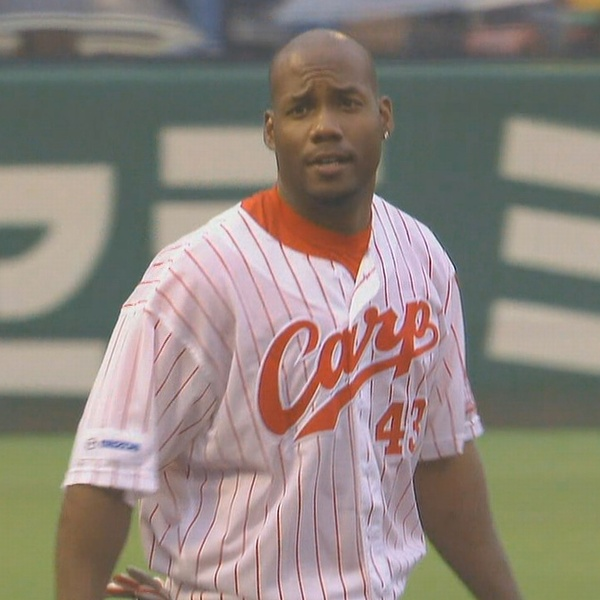
Alex Ochoa is the only player to hit a cycle in both Nippon Professional Baseball and Major League Baseball.

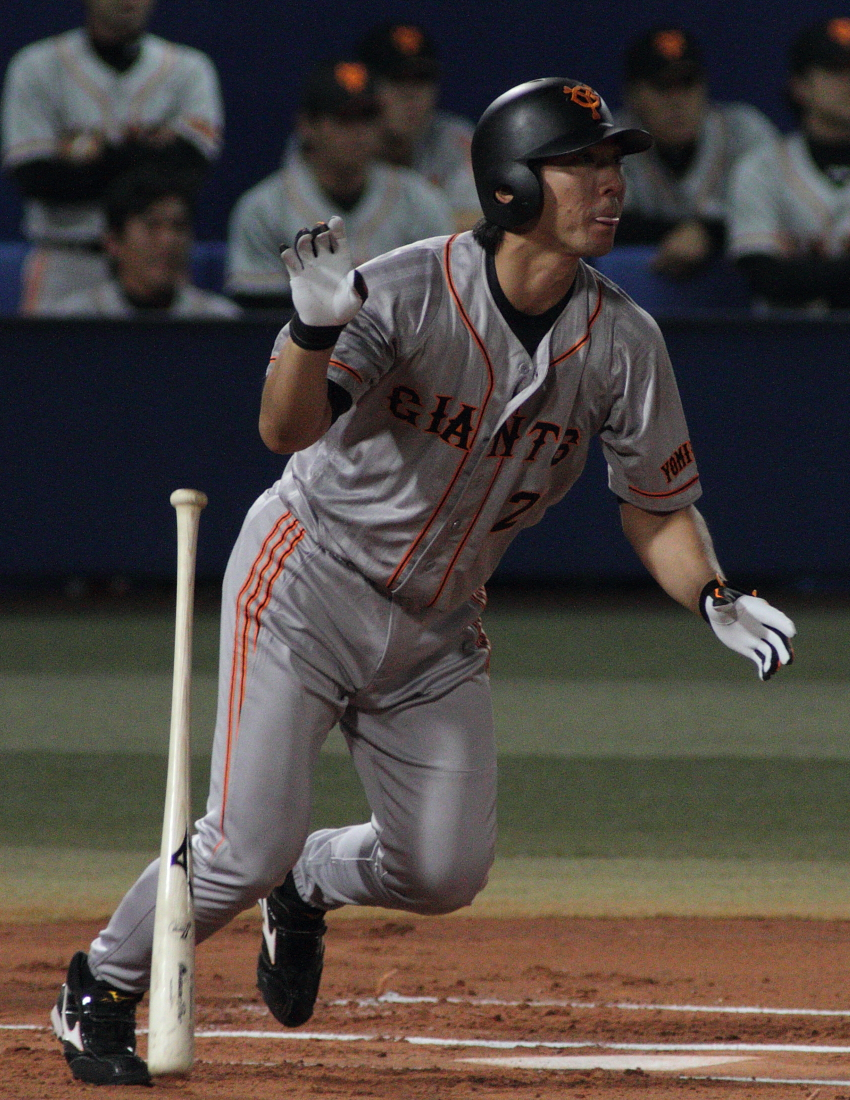
Michihiro Ogasawara hit for the cycle on September 3, 2008, against the Yomiuri Giants.

Nippon Professional Baseball players who have hit for the cycle, the date of its occurrence, team, league, and opponent
No.	Player	Date	Team	League	Opponent	Stadium	Ref
1	Fumio Fujimura^{†} (1)	October 2, 1948	Osaka Tigers	Japanese Baseball League	Kinsei Stars	Koshien Stadium	
2	Masayasu Kaneda	April 16, 1949	Osaka Tigers	Japanese Baseball League	Nankai Hawks	Korakuen Stadium	
3	Fumio Fujimura^{†}* (2)	May 25, 1950	Osaka Tigers	Central League	Hiroshima Carp	Koshien Stadium	
4	Masato Monzen	June 27, 1950	Taiyo Whales	Central League	Chunichi Dragons	Korakuen Stadium	
5	Natsuki Higashitani	April 13, 1952	Hankyu Braves	Pacific League	Mainichi Orions	Kawasaki Stadium	
6	Naoto Asahara	April 20, 1952	Tokyu Flyers	Pacific League	Kintetsu Pearls	Kawasaki Stadium	
7	Masaharu Takita	June 22, 1952	Daiei Stars	Pacific League	Tokyu Flyers	Kawasaki Stadium	
8	Takenori Yamakawa	June 26, 1952	Hiroshima Carp	Central League	Kokutetsu Swallows	Korakuen Stadium	
9	Noboru Aota^{†}	April 23, 1953	Taiyo Shochiku Robins	Central League	Yomiuri Giants	Korakuen Stadium	
10	Tokumitsu Harada	August 17, 1953	Nagoya Dragons	Central League	Yomiuri Giants	Korakuen Stadium	
11	Hiroshi Ohshita^{†}^{§}	July 15, 1954	Nishitetsu Lions	Pacific League	Hankyu Braves	Heiwadai Stadium	
12	Tetsuharu Kawakami^{†}	July 25, 1954	Yomiuri Giants	Central League	Hiroshima Carp	Shikishima Stadium	
13	Tokuji Iida^{†}^{§}	August 24, 1955	Nankai Hawks	Pacific League	Tombo Unions	Kawasaki Stadium	
14	Shoichi Busujima	June 23, 1957	Toei Flyers	Pacific League	Kintetsu Pearls	Komazawa Baseball Stadium	
15	Kiyoshi Watanabe^{§}	July 19, 1957	Hankyu Braves	Pacific League	Kintetsu Pearls	Osaka Stadium	
16	Takao Katsuragi	August 27, 1957	Mainichi Orions	Pacific League	Nankai Hawks	Osaka Stadium	
17	Akira Owada	June 20, 1959	Hiroshima Carp	Central League	Taiyo Whales	Hiroshima Municipal Stadium	
18	Yukihiko Machida	July 26, 1959	Kokutetsu Swallows	Central League	Chunichi Dragons	Nagoya Stadium	
19	Taisuke Obuchi	August 6, 1960	Nishitetsu Lions	Pacific League	Toei Flyers	Heiwadai Stadium	
20	Isao Harimoto^{†}	May 7, 1961	Toei Flyers	Pacific League	Kintetsu Buffalo	Komazawa Baseball Stadium	
21	Kazuhiko Kondo*	July 8, 1961	Taiyo Whales	Central League	Hanshin Tigers	Kawasaki Stadium	
22	Masuho Maeda	September 16, 1962	Chunichi Dragons	Central League	Taiyo Whales	Nagoya Stadium	
23	Sadaharu Oh^{†}	April 25, 1963	Yomiuri Giants	Central League	Hanshin Tigers	Korakuen Stadium	
24	Daryl Spencer^{§}	July 16, 1965	Hankyu Braves	Pacific League	Kintetsu Buffaloes	Nishikyogoku Stadium	
25	Hiromi Wada	May 28, 1968	Nishitetsu Lions	Pacific League	Nankai Hawks	Heiwadai Stadium	
26	Hiroyuki Yamazaki	August 14, 1971	Lotte Orions	Pacific League	Toei Flyers	Meiji Jingu Stadium	
27	Sumio Hirota	July 11, 1973	Lotte Orions	Pacific League	Nittaku Home Flyers	Meiji Jingu Stadium	
28	Takahiro Tokutsu*	April 17, 1976	Lotte Orions	Pacific League	Taiheiyo Club Lions	Miyagi Baseball Stadium	
29	Sachio Kinugasa^{†}	July 7, 1976	Hiroshima Toyo Carp	Central League	Yomiuri Giants	Maruyama Baseball Stadium	
30	Tsutomu Wakamatsu^{†}	July 9, 1976	Yakult Swallows	Central League	Chunichi Dragons	Meiji Jingu Stadium	
31	Keiichi Nagasaki	May 20, 1978	Yokohama Taiyo Whales	Central League	Hanshin Tigers	Yokohama Stadium	
32	Akinobu Mayumi	May 20, 1979	Hanshin Tigers	Central League	Chunichi Dragons	Nagoya Stadium	
33	Mitsuyasu Hirano	July 17, 1980	Kintetsu Buffaloes	Pacific League	Hankyu Braves	Hankyu Nishinomiya Stadium	
34	Tatsuo Omiya	July 29, 1980	Nippon-Ham Fighters	Pacific League	Nankai Hawks	Osaka Stadium	
35	Yutaka Fukumoto^{†}	May 21, 1981	Hankyu Braves	Pacific League	Seibu Lions	Seibu Lions Stadium	
36	Hiromi Matsunaga (1)	October 8, 1982	Hankyu Braves	Pacific League	Nankai Hawks	Hankyu Nishinomiya Stadium	
37	Koji Yamamoto^{†}	April 30, 1983	Hiroshima Toyo Carp	Central League	Hanshin Tigers	Koshien Stadium	
38	Shigeru Kurihashi	May 21, 1985	Kintetsu Buffaloes	Pacific League	Nankai Hawks	Osaka Stadium	
39	Takanori Okamura*	May 22, 1985	Seibu Lions	Pacific League	Lotte Orions	Heiwadai Stadium	
40	Yoshiaki Kanemura	July 17, 1986	Kintetsu Buffaloes	Pacific League	Hankyu Braves	Hankyu Nishinomiya Stadium	
41	Koji Akiyama^{†}	July 13, 1989	Seibu Lions	Pacific League	Kintetsu Buffaloes	Fujiidera Stadium	
42	Fujio Tamura	October 1, 1989	Nippon-Ham Fighters	Pacific League	Fukuoka Daiei Hawks	Heiwadai Stadium	
43	Hiroshi Fujimoto	July 7, 1990	Fukuoka Daiei Hawks	Pacific League	Nippon-Ham Fighters	Hamamatsu Stadium	
44	Takahiro Ikeyama	August 23, 1990	Yakult Swallows	Central League	Chunichi Dragons	Meiji Jingu Stadium	
45	Hiromi Matsunaga (2)	May 24, 1991	Orix Braves	Pacific League	Lotte Orions	Green Stadium Kobe	
46	Jack Howell	July 29, 1992	Yakult Swallows	Central League	Chunichi Dragons	Meiji Jingu Stadium	
47	Norihiro Nakamura	September 18, 1994	Kintetsu Buffaloes	Pacific League	Nippon-Ham Fighters	Fujiidera Stadium	
48	Bobby Rose (1)	May 2, 1995	Yokohama BayStars	Central League	Chunichi Dragons	Yokohama Stadium	
49	Bobby Rose (2)	April 29, 1997	Yokohama BayStars	Central League	Yakult Swallows	Yokohama Stadium	
50	Kazuyoshi Tatsunami	August 22, 1997	Chunichi Dragons	Central League	Hanshin Tigers	Nagoya Dome	
51	Katsumi Hirosawa	September 26, 1997	Yomiuri Giants	Central League	Chunichi Dragons	Tokyo Dome	
52	Tomoaki Kanemoto ^{†}	April 24, 1999	Hiroshima Toyo Carp	Central League	Chunichi Dragons	Hiroshima Municipal Stadium	
53	Toshihisa Nishi	June 25, 1999	Yomiuri Giants	Central League	Hiroshima Toyo Carp	Hiroshima Municipal Stadium	
54	Bobby Rose (3)	June 30, 1999	Yokohama BayStars	Central League	Hiroshima Toyo Carp	Alpen Stadium	
55	Kazuo Matsui	June 7, 2000	Seibu Lions	Pacific League	Osaka Kintetsu Buffaloes	Seibu Dome	
56	Boi Rodriguez	July 27, 2002	Yokohama BayStars	Central League	Hiroshima Toyo Carp	Chiyodai Baseball Stadium	
57	Hirokazu Ibata	September 21, 2002	Chunichi Dragons	Central League	Yokohama BayStars	Nagoya Dome	
58	José Ortiz^{§}	May 3, 2003	Orix BlueWave	Pacific League	Seibu Lions	Seibu Dome	
59	Kosuke Fukudome	June 8, 2003	Chunichi Dragons	Central League	Hiroshima Toyo Carp	Nagoya Dome	
60	Atsunori Inaba	July 1, 2003	Yakult Swallows	Central League	Yokohama BayStars	Matsumoto Baseball Stadium	
61	Arihito Muramatsu*	July 1, 2003	Fukuoka Daiei Hawks	Pacific League	Osaka Kintetsu Buffaloes	Osaka Dome	
62	Shinjiro Hiyama	July 2, 2003	Hanshin Tigers	Central League	Chunichi Dragons	Koshien Stadium	
63	Toru Hosokawa	April 4, 2004	Seibu Lions	Pacific League	Hokkaido Nippon-Ham Fighters	Sapporo Dome	
64	Alex Ochoa^{§}	April 13, 2004	Chunichi Dragons	Central League	Yomiuri Giants	Tokyo Dome	
65	Julio Zuleta	September 22, 2007	Chiba Lotte Marines	Pacific League	Tohoku Rakuten Golden Eagles	Fullcast Stadium Miyagi	
66	Michihiro Ogasawara	September 3, 2008	Yomiuri Giants	Central League	Hiroshima Toyo Carp	Kyocera Dome Osaka	
67	Rainel Rosario	September 2, 2014	Hiroshima Toyo Carp	Central League	Yomiuri Giants	Nagano Olympic Stadium	
68	Yohei Oshima	July 20, 2016	Chunichi Dragons	Central League	Hiroshima Toyo Carp	Mazda Stadium	
69	Kosuke Fukudome (2)	July 30, 2016	Hanshin Tigers	Central League	Chunichi Dragons	Koshien Stadium	
70	Yuki Yanagita	April 21, 2018	Fukuoka SoftBank Hawks	Pacific League	Hokkaido Nippon-Ham Fighters	Sapporo Dome	
71	Tetsuto Yamada	July 9, 2018	Tokyo Yakult Swallows	Central League	Yomiuri Giants	Kusanagi Stadium	
72	Masayuki Kuwahara	July 20, 2018	Yokohama DeNA BayStars	Central League	Hanshin Tigers	Yokohama Stadium	
73	Ryosuke Hirata	August 16, 2018	Chunichi Dragons	Central League	Yokohama DeNA BayStars	Nagoya Dome	
74	Ryutaro Umeno	April 9, 2019	Hanshin Tigers	Central League	Yokohama DeNA BayStars	Koshien Stadium	
75	Shugo Maki	August 25, 2021	Yokohama DeNA BayStars	Central League	Hanshin Tigers	Osaka Dome	
76	Yasutaka Shiomi	September 18, 2021	Tokyo Yakult Swallows	Central League	Yomiuri Giants	Tokyo Dome	
77	Yoshihiro Maru	August 19, 2025	Yomiuri Giants	Central League	Tokyo Yakult Swallows	Meiji Jingu Stadium	
78	Kazuya Maruyama	May 1, 2026	Tokyo Yakult Swallows	Central League	Yokohama DeNA BayStars	Meiji Jingu Stadium	

== Cycles by franchise ==
List of franchises, showing NPB-active dates and numbers of cycles achieved and allowed
Franchise	Active dates	Cycles hit	Cycles allowed
Taiyo Shochiku Robins / Yosho Robins / Taiyo Whales / Yokohama Taiyo Whales / Yokohama BayStars / Yokohama DeNA BayStars	1950–present	10	7
Nagoya Club / Sangyo Club / Chubu Nippon / Chubu Nippon Dragons / Nagoya Dragons / Chunichi Dragons	1936–present	8	11
Hankyu Baseball Club / Hankyu Bears / Hankyu Braves / Orix Braves / Orix BlueWave / Orix Buffaloes	1936–present	7	3
Nishitetsu Clippers / Nishitetsu Lions / Taiheiyo Club Lions / Crown Lighter Lions / Seibu Lions / Saitama Seibu Lions	1950–present	7	3
Hanshin Baseball Club / Osaka Tigers / Hanshin Tigers	1936–present	7	7
Kokutetsu Swallows / Sankei Swallows / Sankei Atoms / Atoms / Yakult Atoms / Yakult Swallows / Tokyo Yakult Swallows	1950–present	8	2
Hiroshima Carp / Hiroshima Toyo Carp	1950–present	6	8
Great Japan Tokyo Baseball Club / Tokyo Giants / Yomiuri Giants	1934–present	6	7
Mainichi Orions / Mainichi Daimai Orions / Tokyo Orions / Lotte Orions / Chiba Lotte Marines	1950–present	5	3
Senators / Kyuei Flyers / Tokyu Flyers / Toei Flyers / Nittaku Home Flyers / Nippon-Ham Fighters / Hokkaido Nippon-Ham Fighters	1946–present	5	8
Kintetsu Pearls / Kintetsu Buffalo / Kintetsu Buffaloes / Osaka Kintetsu Buffaloes	1950–2004	4	8
Nankai Club / Kinki Nippon Club / Kinki Great Ring / Nankai Hawks / Fukuoka Daiei Hawks / Fukuoka SoftBank Hawks	1938–present	4	7
Gold Star / Kinsei Stars / Daiei Stars / Daiei Unions	1946–1957	1	1
Tombo Unions / Takahashi Unions	1954–1956	0	1
Tohoku Rakuten Golden Eagles	2005–present	0	1

== See also ==
- List of Major League Baseball players to hit for the cycle
- List of KBO players to hit for the cycle
