= Jung Hoo Lee =

South Korean baseball player (born 1998)

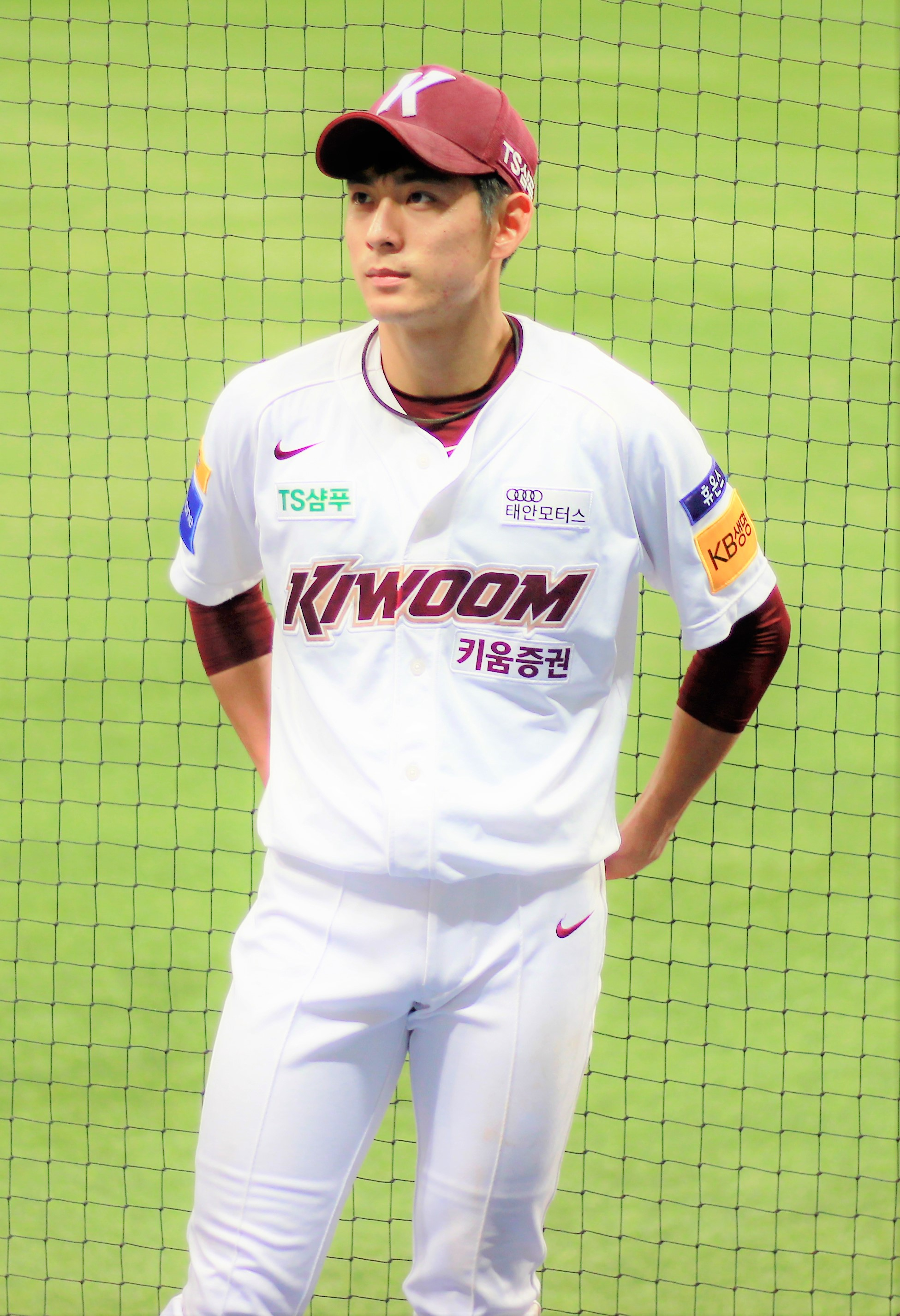
- Lee in 2019

San Francisco Giants – No. 51
- Outfielder
- Born: August 20, 1998 (age 28); Nagoya, Aichi, Japan
- Bats: Left Throws: Right

Professional debut
- KBO: April 1, 2017, for the Nexen Heroes
- MLB: March 28, 2024, for the San Francisco Giants

KBO statistics (through 2023 season)
- Batting average: .340
- Home runs: 65
- Runs batted in: 515

MLB statistics (through 2026 season)
- Batting average: .270
- Home runs: 20
- Runs batted in: 120
- Stats at Baseball Reference

Teams
- Nexen / Kiwoom Heroes (2017–2023); San Francisco Giants (2024–present)

Career highlights and awards
- KBO: KBO Rookie of the Year (2017); KBO Most Valuable Player (2022); 5× KBO Golden Glove Award (2018–2022); 6× KBO All-Star (2017, 2019-2023); 2× KBO batting champion (2021–2022); 2× KBO Playoff MVP (2019, 2022); International: WBSC Premier12 All-World Team (2019)
Medals
Men's baseball
Representing South Korea
Asian Games
Gold medal – first place	2018 Jakarta	Team
WBSC Premier12
Silver medal – second place	2019 Tokyo	Team
Korean name
Hangul	이정후
Hanja	李政厚
RR	I Jeonghu
MR	I Chŏnghu

Jung Hoo Lee (Korean: 이정후; born August 20, 1998) is a South Korean professional baseball outfielder for the San Francisco Giants of Major League Baseball (MLB). He has previously played in the KBO League for the Kiwoom Heroes.

Lee won the KBO League Rookie of the Year Award in 2017 and the KBO League Most Valuable Player Award in 2022. He won five consecutive Golden Glove Awards from 2018 to 2022. Lee has also played for the South Korea national baseball team at the 2019 WBSC Premier12, 2020 Summer Olympics, and the 2023 and 2026 World Baseball Classic.

He is the son of Lee Jong-beom, a star player in the KBO league and with the nickname "Son of the Wind," earning the younger Lee the moniker "Grandson of the Wind."

== Early life ==
Lee was born on August 20, 1998, in Nagoya, Japan, when his father was playing in Nippon Professional Baseball (NPB) for the Chunichi Dragons. After his father signed with the KIA Tigers in 2001, the family moved to Gwangju, South Korea. They moved to Seoul in 2012 upon his father's retirement where Lee was enrolled in Whimoon Middle School and then Whimoon High School, a prestigious sports-focused high school.

It is said that his father was initially against his son becoming a baseball player and tried to introduce him to other sports, but eventually gave in on the condition that Lee batted left-handed, despite being naturally right-handed. Upon doing this, he began to look up to Japanese star Ichiro Suzuki, who was also a right-handed thrower/ left-handed batter, and picked the number 51 as his jersey number to honor him. In a profile of his father, a 7-year old Jung-hoo was already attracting attention for his natural skill and commitment to the sport.

== Professional career ==
=== Nexen / Kiwoom Heroes ===
The Nexen Heroes selected Lee in the first round of the 2017 KBO League draft (held in 2016) as an infielder along with Kim Hye-seong, his future teammate and friend. Following spring training, Lee was included on the team's Opening Day roster at age 18 without playing in the KBO Futures League - the KBO minor leagues. Converted into an outfielder, Lee became the first rookie out of high school to appear in every game for a KBO team. He finished the season batting .324/.395/.417 with two home runs, 47 RBI, 12 stolen bases, and 179 hits, which set a new rookie record for hits. At the conclusion of the season, Lee was voted KBO League Rookie of the Year Award.

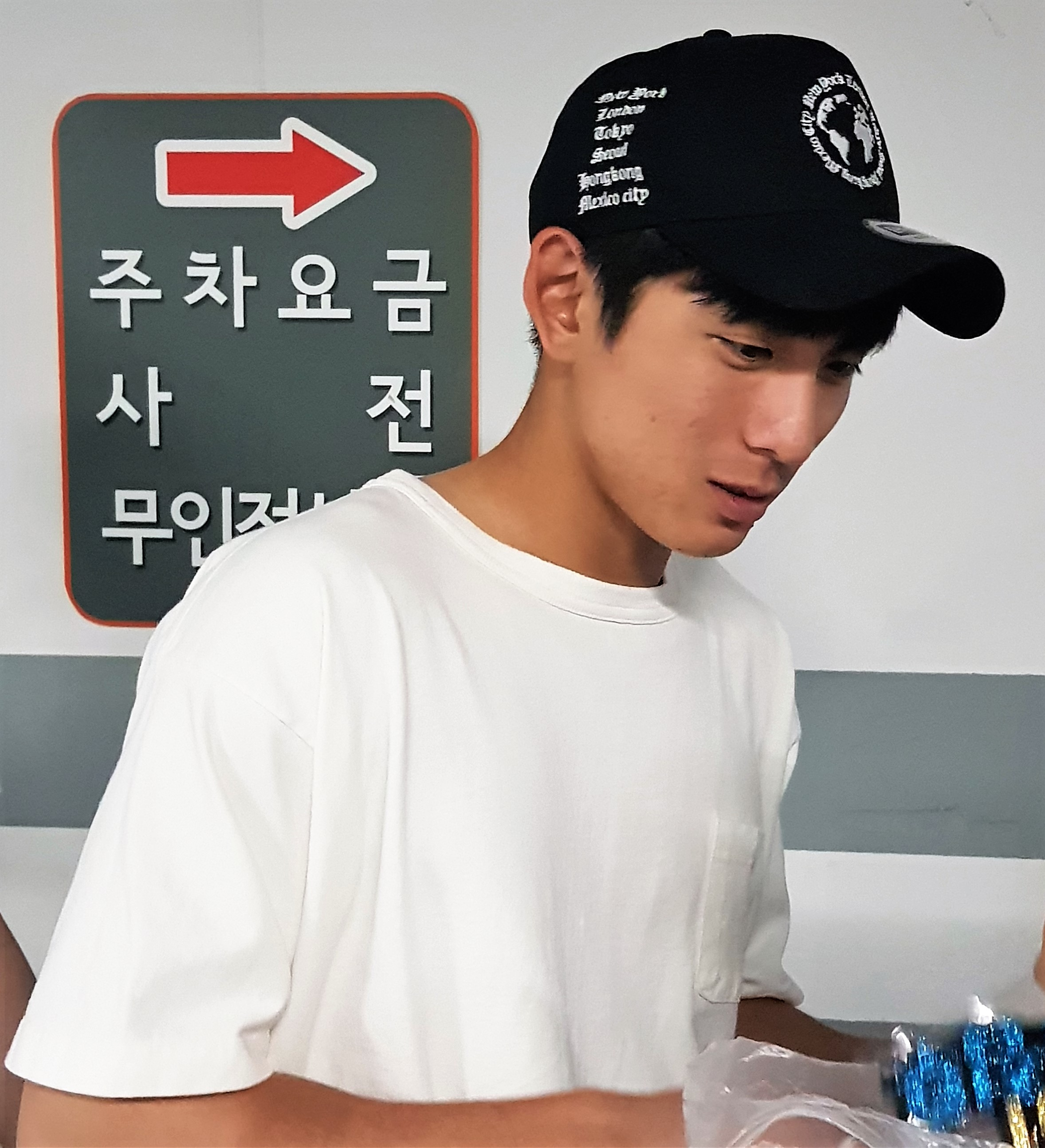
Lee in 2018

In 2018, Lee suffered a shoulder injury and was sidelined for 6 weeks but still improved on his rookie numbers with a slash line of .355/.412/.477 with six home runs and 57 RBI by the end of the season. He also ended third in the league in batting average. In 2019, his slash line was .336/.386/.456 with six home runs and 68 RBI while he was voted the MVP of the 2019 playoffs for the first time.

Lee won another Golden Glove Award in 2020 while his batting line was .333/.397/.524, with 15 home runs, 101 RBI, and an OPS of .921.

In the 2021 season, Lee batted .360/.438/.522 with 7 home runs, 84 RBIs, 10 stolen bases, an OPS of .959 and while leading the league in batting average. On October 25 at Daejeon Hanwha Life Eagles Park, Lee hit for the cycle against the Samsung Lions.

During the 2022 season, Lee played in 142 games and hit .349/.421/.575 with 23 home runs, 113 RBI, a 5.1% strikeout rate, and a career-high OPS of .996. He became the youngest and fastest player in KBO history to reach 1,000 hits at 23 years old in 747 games, a record previously held by his father who achieved the feat in 779 games. After the season, he won the KBO League Most Valuable Player Award. while placing first in the league in batting average, hits, RBI, on-base percentage, and slugging percentage. He also received the playoff MVP once again.

In 2023, Lee became captain of the Heroes and played in 85 games for Kiwoom, while hitting .319/.407/.456 with six home runs and 45 RBI. On July 25, 2023, it was announced that Lee would undergo season–ending surgery after suffering a fractured ankle. On December 4, Lee was officially posted to Major League Baseball (MLB) by the Heroes.

=== San Francisco Giants ===
On December 14, 2023, Lee signed a six-year, $113 million contract with the San Francisco Giants. The Giants also had to pay a posting fee of $18.825 million to the Heroes. Lee hit his first home run in MLB on March 30, 2024, against the San Diego Padres in Petco Park. Family members, including his father, were in attendance to witness the event. Lee suffered an injury to his left shoulder after crashing into the wall trying to catch a flyout ball on May 12, and the Giants announced that he would undergo season–ending labrum surgery on May 17. In 37 games for the Giants, Lee hit .262/.310/.331 with two home runs and eight RBI.

In 2025 with the Giants, Lee played in 150 games and slashed .266/.327/.407 with eight home runs, 55 RBI, and 10 stolen bases. He led the team in batting average, base running value, strikeout rate, doubles (31), and triples (12). On September 26, he hit his 12th triple of the season which landed him in 3rd place for the most triples in all MLB (2nd in the NL) and tied the record for the most triples by an Asian player in a season, previously held by Ichiro Suzuki.

On May 14, 2026, Lee hit an inside–the–park home run off of Emmet Sheehan of the Los Angeles Dodgers, becoming the first player to record an inside–the–parker at Dodger Stadium.

== International career ==
Lee's first appearance for the South Korea national baseball team was at the 2016 U-18 Baseball World Cup, as South Korea won the tournament. Lee then went on to represent the national team in the 2017 Asia Professional Baseball Championship, where South Korea placed 2nd overall.

In the 2018 Asian Games, Lee delivered the winning RBI against Taiwan on November 17. He also played for Team Korea at the 2019 WBSC Premier12 tournament, and led all players at the tournament with five doubles. Lee went on to represent South Korea at the Tokyo 2020 Olympics and the 2023 World Baseball Classic as well. In 2026, he was chosen as the captain for Team South Korea in the 2026 World Baseball Classic leading the team to the quarterfinals for the first time in 17 years

== Endorsements ==
Lee has been listed in the top 10 the Forbes Korea Power Celebrity 40 List in both 2024 and 2025 at #6 and #7 respectively.

Lee is a brand ambassador for Korean brands Paldo and USANA.

Lee is also a brand ambassador for foreign brands Adidas, Tag Heuer, and McLaren.

Lee has modeled for photo shoots with Dior and Louis Vuitton.

== See also ==
- List of KBO players to hit for the cycle
