= List of KBO players to hit for the cycle =

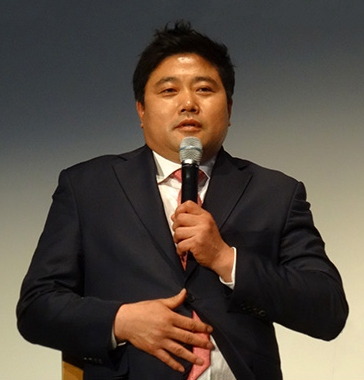
Yang Joon-hyuk was the first to hit multiple cycles.

In baseball, completing the cycle is the accomplishment of hitting a single, a double, a triple, and a home run in the same game. Collecting the hits in that order is known as a "natural cycle", which has occurred two times in KBO League. The cycle itself is rare in KBO, occurring 31 times since Oh Dae-seok's first cycle in 1982, the first season of KBO League. In terms of frequency within the KBO league, it is a record that is more frequent than no-hitter (19 times in KBO history). Of the 10 current KBO League teams, only the SSG Landers have never had at least one player hit for the cycle.

The most cycles hit by a player in KBO League is two, accomplished by Yang Joon-hyuk and Eric Thames. Playing for the Samsung Lions, Yang hit his first cycle on August 23, 1996, and the next on April 15, 2003. And Thames became the first player in KBO League history to hit for the cycle two times in a season, by hitting for the cycle on April 9 and August 11 in the 2015 season. Oh Yoon-Suk is the only player to have hit a grand slam as the home run of the cycle.

The 2016 and 2017 seasons saw the most cycles hit in a single season—three times. The longest period of time between two players hitting for the cycle is one day shy of 1902 days. The drought has lasted from Oh Dae-seok's cycle in 1982 until Lee Kang-Don's in 1987.

== Cycles by player ==
Key to symbols in player table
| * | Denotes a natural cycle |
| § | Indicates that a hit required for the cycle was acquired during extra innings |
| (x) | Number of cycles recorded to that point (if the player recorded more than one) |

KBO League players who have hit for the cycle, the date of its occurrence, team, league, and opponent
| No. | Player | Date | Team | Opponent | Stadium | Ref |
|---|---|---|---|---|---|---|
| 1 | Oh Dae-seok | June 12, 1982 | Samsung Lions | Sammi Superstars | Gudeok Baseball Stadium | |
| 2 | Lee Kang-Don | August 27, 1987 | Binggrae Eagles | OB Bears | Daejeon Hanbat Baseball Stadium | |
| 3 | Jung Koo-seon | August 31, 1987 | Lotte Giants | Cheongbo Pintos | Incheon Sungui Baseball Stadium | |
| 4 | Kang Seok-Chun | August 4, 1990 | Binggrae Eagles | Pacific Dolphins | Daejeon Hanbat Baseball Stadium | |
| 5 | Lim Hyeong-seok | August 23, 1992 | OB Bears | Lotte Giants | Jamsil Baseball Stadium | |
| 6 | Seo Yong-Bin | April 16, 1994 | LG Twins | Lotte Giants | Sajik Baseball Stadium | |
| 7 | Kim Eung-Gook* | April 14, 1996 | Lotte Giants | Hanhwa Eagles | Sajik Baseball Stadium | |
| 8 | Yang Joon-hyuk (1) | August 23, 1996 | Samsung Lions | Hyundai Unicorns | Daegu Baseball Stadium | |
| 9 | Manny Martínez | May 26, 2001 | Samsung Lions | Haitai Tigers | Daegu Baseball Stadium | |
| 10 | Jeon Jun-ho | July 6, 2001 | Hyundai Unicorns | Samsung Lions | Daegu Baseball Stadium | |
| 11 | Yang Joon-hyuk (2) | April 15, 2003 | Samsung Lions | Hyundai Unicorns | Suwon Baseball Stadium | |
| 12 | Shin Jong-Gil | September 21, 2004 | Hanhwa Eagles | Doosan Bears | Daejeon Hanbat Baseball Stadium | |
| 13 | Ahn Chi-Yongl | June 26, 2008 | LG Twins | Samsung Lions | Daegu Baseball Stadium | |
| 14 | Lee Jong-wook | April 11, 2009 | Doosan Bears | LG Twins | Jamsil Baseball Stadium | |
| 15 | Lee Byung-kyu | July 5, 2013 | LG Twins | Nexen Heroes | Mokdong Baseball Stadium | |
| 16 | Oh Jae-won | May 23, 2014 | Doosan Bears | Hanhwa Eagles | Jamsil Baseball Stadium | |
| 17 | Eric Thames (1) | April 9, 2015 | NC Dinos | KIA Tigers | Gwangju-Kia Champions Field | |
| 18 | Eric Thames (2) | August 11, 2015 | NC Dinos | Nexen Heroes | Mokdong Baseball Stadium | |
| 19 | Kim Joo-chan | April 15, 2016 | KIA Tigers | Nexen Heroes | Gwangju-Kia Champions Field | |
| 20 | Park Kun-woo | June 16, 2016 | Doosan Bears | KIA Tigers | Gwangju-Kia Champions Field | |
| 21 | Choi Hyoung-woo | August 18, 2016 | Samsung Lions | kt wiz | Suwon Baseball Stadium | |
| 22 | Seo Geon-chang | April 7, 2017 | Nexen Heroes | Doosan Bears | Jamsil Baseball Stadium | |
| 23 | Jung Jin-ho | June 7, 2017 | Doosan Bears | Samsung Lions | Jamsil Baseball Stadium | |
| 24 | Roger Bernadina | June 7, 2017 | KIA Tigers | kt wiz | Gwangju-Kia Champions Field | |
| 25 | Mel Rojas Jr. | May 29, 2018 | kt wiz | Samsung Lions | Daegu Samsung Lions Park | |
| 26 | Kim Hye-seong | May 30, 2020 | Kiwoom Heroes | kt wiz | Gocheok Sky Dome | |
| 27 | Oh Yun-Seok | October 4, 2020 | Lotte Giants | Hanhwa Eagles | Sajik Baseball Stadium | |
| 28 | Yang Eui-ji | April 29, 2021 | NC Dinos | Samsung Lions | Daegu Samsung Lions Park | |
| 29 | Jung-hoo Lee | October 25, 2021 | Kiwoom Heroes | Hanhwa Eagles | Daejeon Hanwha Life Eagles Park | |
| 30 | Kang Seung-ho | September 15, 2023 | Doosan Bears | KIA Tigers | Gwangju-Kia Champions Field | |
| 31 | Kim Do-yeong* | July 23, 2024 | KIA Tigers | NC Dinos | Gwangju-Kia Champions Field | |

== Cycles by franchise ==
List of franchises, showing KBO League-active dates and numbers of cycles achieved and allowed
| Franchise | Active dates | Cycles hit | Cycles allowed |
|---|---|---|---|
| OB Bears / Doosan Bears | 1982–present | 6 | 3 |
| Samsung Lions | 1982–present | 5 | 5 |
| Haitai Tigers / KIA Tigers | 1982–present | 3 | 4 |
| MBC Chungyong / LG Twins | 1982–present | 3 | 1 |
| Lotte Giants | 1982–present | 3 | 2 |
| Binggrae Eagles / Hanhwa Eagles | 1986–present | 3 | 4 |
| SK Wyverns / SSG Landers | 2000–present | 0 | 0 |
| Woori Heroes / Heroes / Seoul Heroes / Nexen Heroes / Kiwoom Heroes | 2008–present | 3 | 3 |
| NC Dinos | 2013–present | 3 | 1 |
| kt wiz | 2015–present | 1 | 3 |
| Sammi Superstars / Chungbo Pintos / Pacific Dolphins / Hyundai Unicorns | 1982–2007 | 1 | 5 |
| Ssangbangwool Raiders | 1991–1999 | 0 | 0 |

== See also ==
- List of Major League Baseball players to hit for the cycle
- List of Nippon Professional Baseball players to hit for the cycle
