= Kazuya Maruyama =

Kazuya Maruyama may refer to:

- Kazuya Maruyama (politician)
- Kazuya Maruyama (baseball)
