= Hitting for the cycle =

Hitting a single, double, triple, and a home run in one game of baseball

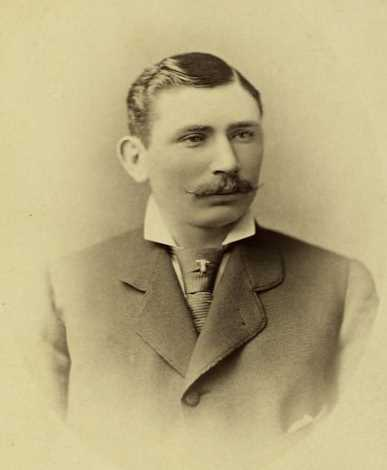
Curry Foley was the first player in Major League Baseball history to hit for the cycle, in 1882 for the Buffalo Bisons.

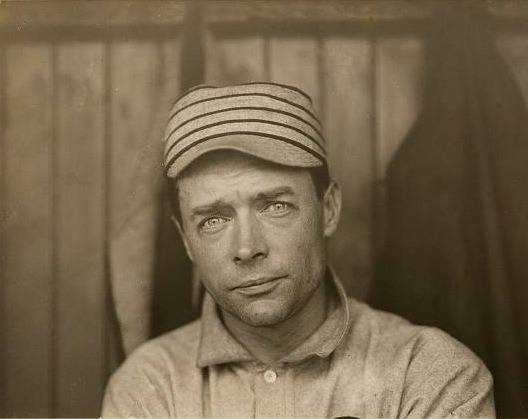
Harry Davis hit the first cycle in American League history, in 1901 for the Philadelphia Athletics.

In baseball, hitting for the cycle is the accomplishment of one batter who hits a single, a double, a triple, and a home run in the same game. Collecting the hits in that order is known as a "natural cycle". Cycles are rare in Major League Baseball (MLB), having occurred fewer than 400 times since 1882. The most recent cycle in Major League Baseball was accomplished by JJ Bleday of the Cincinnati Reds on August 22, 2026.

== Rarity ==
The cycle is about as uncommon as a no-hitter; it has been called "one of the rarest" and "most difficult feats" in baseball. Based on 2009 offensive levels, the probability of an average MLB player hitting for a cycle against an average team in a game is about 0.0059%; this corresponds to about 2 1/2 cycles in a 162-game season with 30 teams. The most cycles hit in a single major league season is eight, which occurred in both 1933 and 2009. The Cincinnati Reds are the most recent team to have a player hit for a cycle, with JJ Bleday doing so on August 22, 2026. The Kansas City Royals hold the longest active cycle drought; the feat was last achieved by George Brett on July 25, 1990 (36 years, 84 days).

In other baseball leagues, the cycle is achieved less frequently. Through June 2022, there have been 76 cycles hit in Nippon Professional Baseball (NPB), the top-level baseball organization in Japan, most recently by Yasutaka Shiomi on September 18, 2021. One NPB player, Atsuya Furuta, has hit for the cycle in an NPB All-Star game. No player has ever hit for the cycle in the MLB All-Star Game. One MLB player has hit for the cycle in a postseason game: Brock Holt of the Boston Red Sox in Game 3 of the 2018 ALDS.

Two players have hit for the cycle on the same day once in NPB history; this has occurred twice in MLB history. There have never been multiple cycles completed in a single MLB or NPB game; this is known to have occurred twice in Minor League Baseball: on April 11, 2018, by Gio Brusa and Jalen Miller of the Class A-Advanced San Jose Giants, and on August 7, 2018, by Kevin Newman and Jacob Stallings of the Triple-A Indianapolis Indians.

== Components ==
=== Single ===
Under Major League Baseball Rule 6.09(a), the "batter becomes a runner when he hits a fair ball". The single—in which the batter reaches first base without being put out, and without the benefit of a fielding error—is the most common type of hit in baseball: for example, there were 25,838 singles hit during the 1988 MLB season, compared to 6,386 doubles, 840 triples, or 3,180 home runs. The MLB leader in singles is Pete Rose, who is also the league's all-time hit leader. The single-season leader in singles is Ichiro Suzuki, who broke Willie Keeler's 106-year-old record in 2004 by notching 225, 19 more than the previous record. None of the top five players in singles (Rose, Ty Cobb, Eddie Collins, Cap Anson, and Keeler) in MLB history have hit for the cycle; of those five, only Rose had more than 150 home runs, and two (Collins and Keeler), who both played during the dead-ball era, had fewer than 50, lessening the probability of their completing the cycle.

=== Double ===
A double is a hit in which the batter reaches second base without being put out and without the benefit of a fielding error. This scenario often occurs when a ball is hit into the gaps between the outfielders or down the foul line on either side of the playing field. Tris Speaker is the all-time leader in doubles in MLB history with 792, one of which was part of a cycle; Speaker accomplished the feat for the Boston Red Sox on June 9, 1912, against the St. Louis Browns. Two of the other top five players in MLB history in doubles have hit for the cycle: Stan Musial (725 doubles; third all-time) completed the cycle on July 24, 1949; and Craig Biggio (668; fifth all-time) accomplished the feat on April 8, 2002. The single-season MLB leader is Earl Webb, the left-handed outfielder who hit 67 in 1931.

=== Triple ===
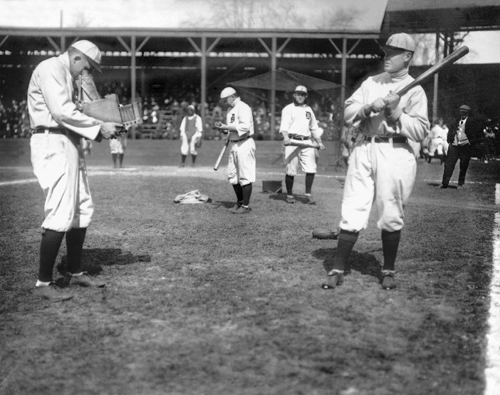
Sam Crawford and Ty Cobb, the top two players in MLB history in triples

The triple, in which the batter reaches third base without being put out and without the benefit of a fielding error, is the "hardest part of a cycle" to complete. Triples are often hit to the same areas as doubles, but may require impressive speed by the runner. It is rare to see a player with slower-than-average running speed complete the cycle, but it has happened, such as when catcher Bengie Molina hit for the cycle on July 16, 2010; Molina described himself as "the [slowest] guy in baseball" earlier that season. The MLB all-time leader in triples is Sam Crawford, with 309; he never hit for the cycle. Of the top five players in MLB history in triples, two have hit for the cycle: Honus Wagner in 1912 and Roger Connor in 1890. Chief Wilson hit for the cycle in 1910, two years before he hit for a record 36 triples in a single season.

=== Home run ===
A home run is a hit in which the batter reaches home plate, scoring a run on the same play without being put out, and without the benefit of a fielding error. Most often in modern baseball, this occurs when the batter hits the ball over the outfield wall in fair territory. Home-run hitters are commonly believed to be larger, slower players due to their strength, and may not be fast enough to complete the triple. The MLB single-season and all-time leader in home runs is Barry Bonds, who hit 73 home runs in the 2001 season and notched 762 in his 22-season career. Bonds never hit for the cycle. Among the MLB leaders in career home runs, the highest-ranking player with a cycle is Alex Rodriguez (fifth all-time; retired in 2016 with 696 home runs), who hit for the cycle on June 5, 1997. Home runs can also occur on a batted ball that does not leave the field of play; this is called an inside-the-park home run. Inside-the-park home runs are rare, and no player has hit one as part of a cycle since 1943.

== Players who have hit for the cycle ==
=== Major League Baseball ===
==== Multiple cycles ====
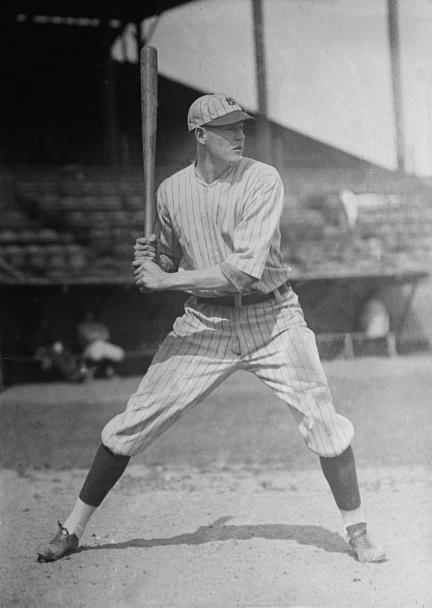
Bob Meusel is one of only six MLB players with three career cycles.

The most career cycles hit by an MLB player is three, accomplished by six players:

MLB players with three cycles in their career
Years			Player	Team	League	Ref.
1883	1883		John Reilly	Cincinnati Red Stockings	American Association	
		1890	John Reilly	Cincinnati Reds	National League	
1921	1922	1928	Bob Meusel	New York Yankees	American League	
1931	1931		Babe Herman	Brooklyn Robins	National League	
		1933	Babe Herman	Chicago Cubs	National League	
2008			Adrián Beltré	Seattle Mariners	American League	
	2012	2015	Adrián Beltré	Texas Rangers	American League	
2017	2019	2021	Trea Turner	Washington Nationals	National League	
2018	2018	2022	Christian Yelich	Milwaukee Brewers	National League	

All of Beltré's cycles occurred at Globe Life Park in Arlington; he is the only player to hit for the cycle with different teams in the same ballpark. All of Yelich's cycles were hit against the Cincinnati Reds; he is the only player to hit for the cycle three times against the same team.

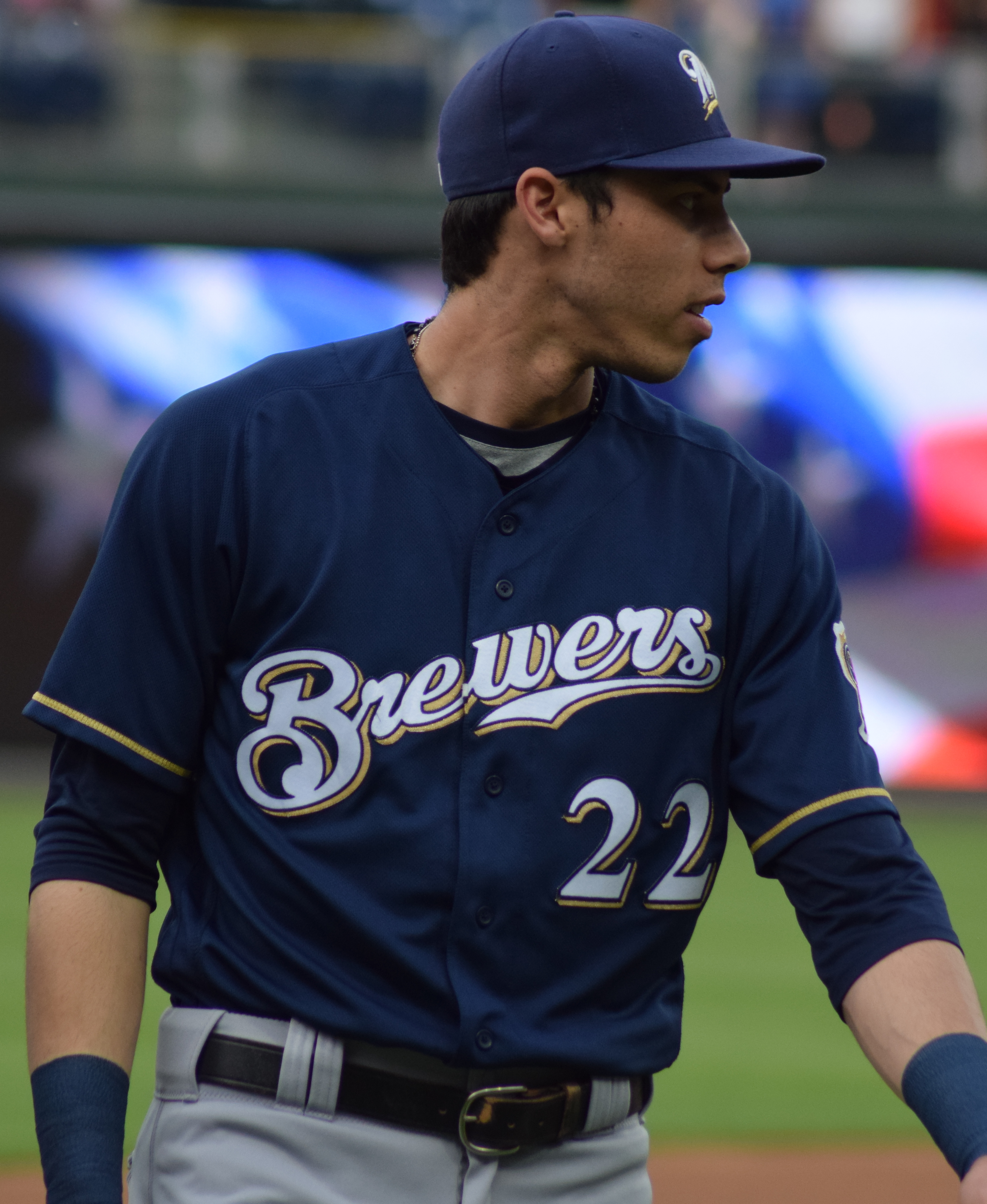
Christian Yelich is the most recent player to hit for the cycle twice in a season, in 2018.

Forty-four players have hit for the cycle at least twice. Five have hit for the cycle twice in one season:

MLB players with two cycles in a season
Year	Player	Team	League	Ref.
1883	John Reilly	Cincinnati Reds	American Association	
1887	Tip O'Neill	St. Louis Brown Stockings	American Association	
1931	Babe Herman	Brooklyn Robins	National League	
2012	Aaron Hill	Arizona Diamondbacks	National League	
2018	Christian Yelich	Milwaukee Brewers	National League	

One player has hit for the cycle twice against the same team in one season: Christian Yelich against the Cincinnati Reds in 2018.

Cycles have occurred on the same day twice in MLB history; on September 17, 1920, by Bobby Veach of the Detroit Tigers and George Burns of the New York Giants; and on September 1, 2008, by the Arizona Diamondbacks' Stephen Drew and the Seattle Mariners' Adrián Beltré. The longest period of time between two players hitting for the cycle was 5 years, 1 month, and 10 days, a drought lasting from Bill Joyce's cycle in 1896 to Harry Davis' in 1901.

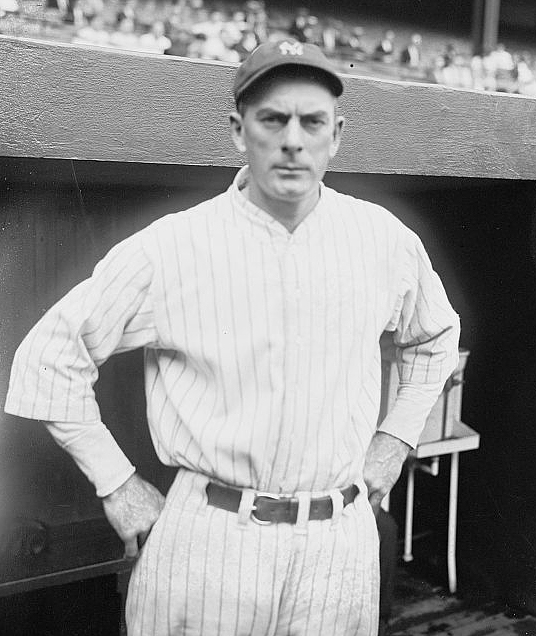
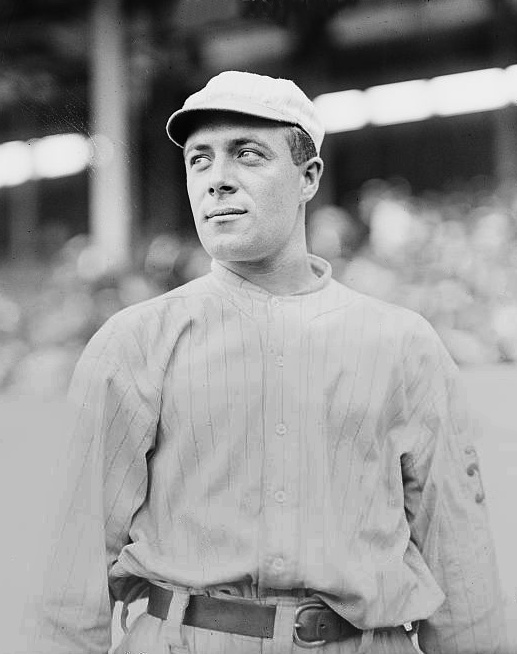
Bobby Veach (left) and George Burns (right) hit for the cycle on the same day, September 17, 1920.

==== Natural cycles ====
The natural cycle, in which the hits come in order from fewest to most total bases (single, double, triple, home run), has been accomplished 15 times in MLB history:

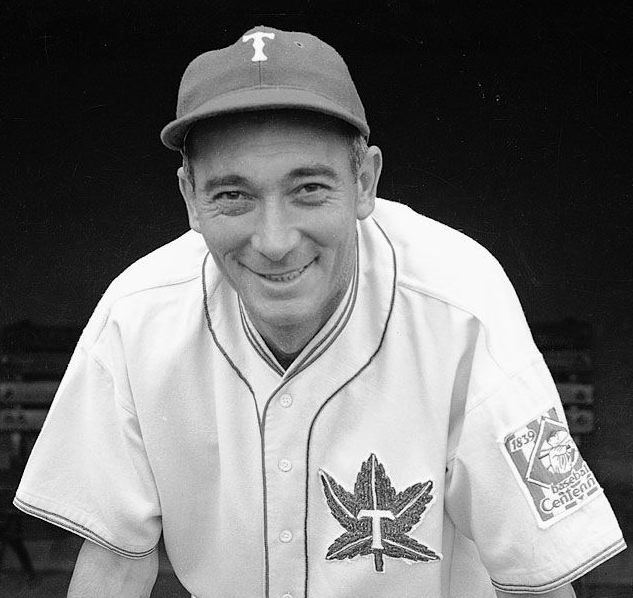
The only natural cycle by a member of the New York Yankees was hit by Tony Lazzeri in 1932.

MLB players who have hit natural cycles
Year	Player	Team	League	Ref.
1883	Lon Knight	Philadelphia Athletics	American Association	
1910	Bill Collins	Boston Doves	National League	
1926	Bob Fothergill	Detroit Tigers	American League	
1932	Tony Lazzeri	New York Yankees	American League	
1939	Charlie Gehringer	Detroit Tigers	American League	
1943	Leon Culberson	Boston Red Sox	American League	
1963	Jim Hickman	New York Mets	National League	
1964	Ken Boyer	St. Louis Cardinals	National League	
1966	Billy Williams	Chicago Cubs	National League	
1976	Tim Foli	Montreal Expos	National League	
1979	Bob Watson	Boston Red Sox	American League	
1996	John Mabry	St. Louis Cardinals	National League	
2000	José Valentín	Chicago White Sox	American League	
2003	Brad Wilkerson	Montreal Expos	National League	
2006	Gary Matthews Jr.	Texas Rangers	American League	

==== Reverse cycles ====
The natural cycle has been accomplished in reverse (home run, triple, double, single)—also known as an "unnatural" cycle—eleven times:

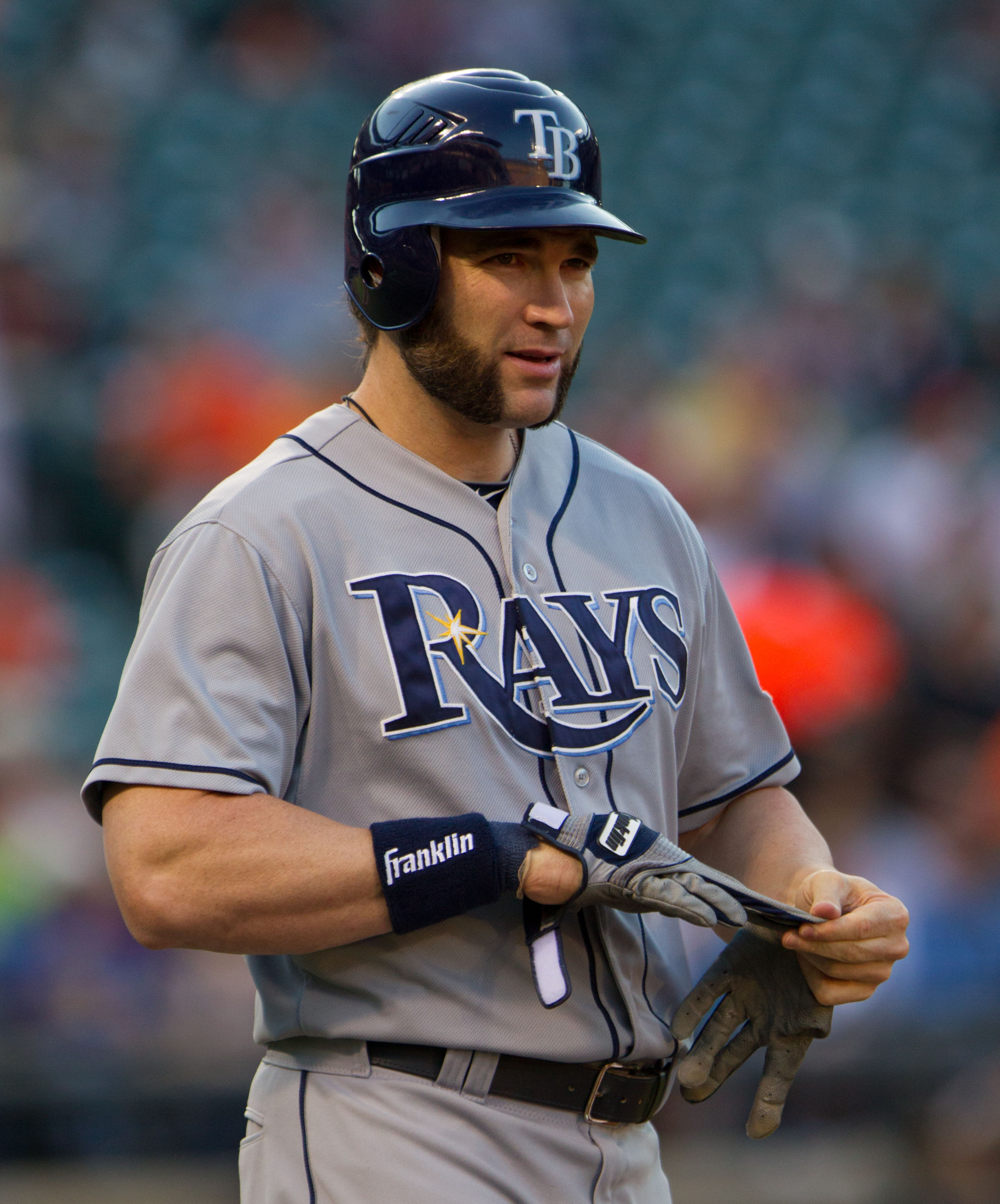
Luke Scott's reverse cycle in 2006 was the first in nearly 40 years.

MLB players who have hit reverse cycles
Year	Player	Team	League	Ref.
1885	Henry Larkin	Philadelphia Athletics	American Association	
1887	Bid McPhee	Cincinnati Red Stockings	American Association	
1904	Sam Mertes	New York Giants	National League	
1937	Gee Walker	Detroit Tigers	American League	
1939	Arky Vaughan	Pittsburgh Pirates	National League	
1948	Jackie Robinson	Brooklyn Dodgers	National League	
1968	Jim Fregosi	California Angels	American League	
2006	Luke Scott	Houston Astros	National League	
2008	Carlos Gómez	Minnesota Twins	American League	
2016	Rajai Davis	Cleveland Indians	American League	
2026	Pete Crow-Armstrong	Chicago Cubs	National League	

==== Other accomplishments ====
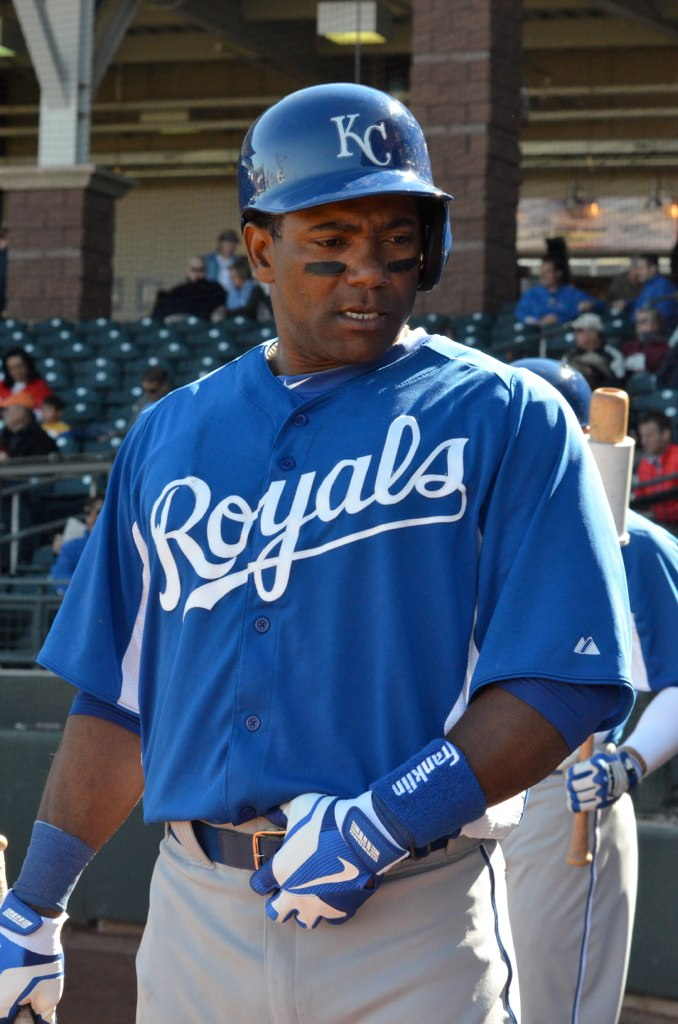
Miguel Tejada's cycle included a grand slam.

Nine players have hit a grand slam as part of their cycle:

MLB players hitting a grand slam in their cycle
Year	Player	Team	League	Ref.
1882	Curry Foley	Buffalo Bisons	National League	
1901	Nap Lajoie	Philadelphia Athletics	American League	
1928	Bill Terry	New York Giants	National League	
1932	Tony Lazzeri	New York Yankees	American League	
1933	Jimmie Foxx	Philadelphia Athletics	American League	
1993	Jay Buhner	Seattle Mariners	American League	
2001	Miguel Tejada	Oakland Athletics	American League	
2009	Jason Kubel	Minnesota Twins	American League	
2010	Bengie Molina	Texas Rangers	American League	

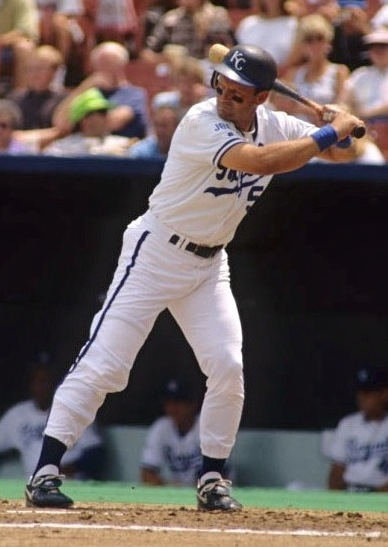
George Brett completed his cycle with a walk-off home run.

Six players have had a walk-off home run as the final hit of their cycles:

MLB players hitting a walk-off home run to complete their cycle
Year	Player	Team	League	Ref.
1961	Ken Boyer	St. Louis Cardinals	National League	
1972	César Tovar	Minnesota Twins	American League	
1979	George Brett	Kansas City Royals	American League	
1984	Dwight Evans	Boston Red Sox	American League	
2010	Carlos González	Colorado Rockies	National League	
2017	Nolan Arenado	Colorado Rockies	National League	

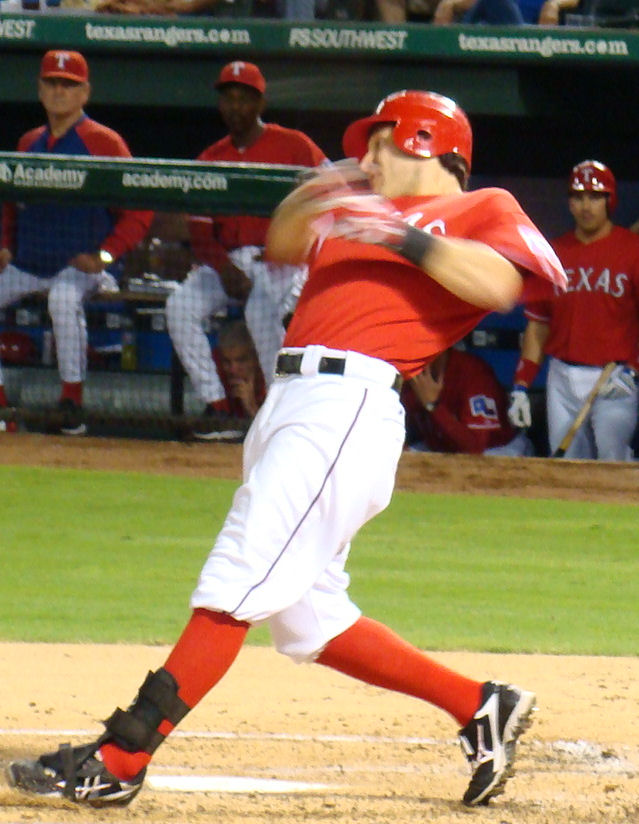
Ian Kinsler went 6-for-6 on the day of his cycle.

Ten players have collected six hits in the game in which they hit their cycle. Only three of these—by Larry Twitchell, Sam Thompson, and Ian Kinsler—were accomplished in a nine-inning game in the American League or National League.

MLB players with six hits in their cycle game
Year	Player	Team	League	Ref.
1883	John Reilly	Cincinnati Red Stockings	American Association	
1885	Dave Orr	New York Metropolitans	American Association	
1885	Henry Larkin	Philadelphia Athletics	American Association	
1889	Larry Twitchell	Cleveland Spiders	National League	
1890	Farmer Weaver	Louisville Colonels	American Association	
1894	Sam Thompson	Philadelphia Phillies	National League	
1920	Bobby Veach†	Detroit Tigers	American League	
1995	Rondell White†	Montreal Expos	National League	
2009	Ian Kinsler	Texas Rangers	American League	
2018	Christian Yelich†	Milwaukee Brewers	National League	

† indicates an extra-innings game (Yelich collected his six hits in the first nine innings of a 10-inning game.)

Kinsler's six-hit cycle came on Jackie Robinson Day, honoring the African-American pioneer who had hit for the cycle in 1948.

The most recent player to hit for the cycle with an inside-the-park home run was Leon Culberson in 1943.

The earliest in a game that a cycle has been completed is the fourth inning, accomplished by Mike Lansing of the Colorado Rockies on June 18, 2000, when he had a first-inning triple, second-inning homer, third-inning double, and fourth-inning single.

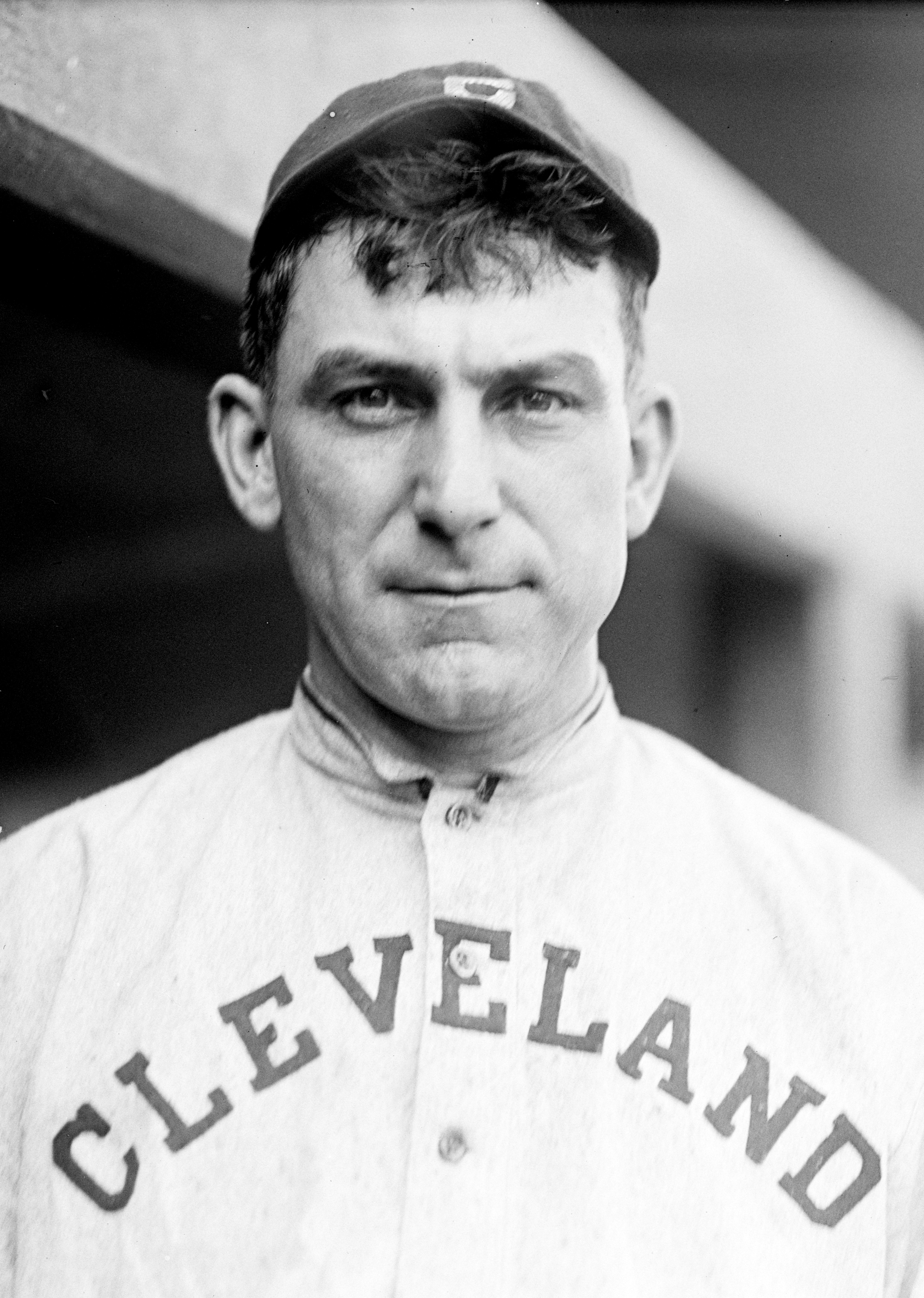
In 1901, Nap Lajoie hit for the cycle and won the AL Triple Crown.

Four batters hit for the cycle in the same season in which they won the Triple Crown: Nap Lajoie (AL, 1901), Jimmie Foxx (AL, 1933), Chuck Klein (NL, 1933), and Lou Gehrig (AL, 1934). Gehrig is the only player to complete the MLB Triple Crown in his cycle-hitting season, leading both leagues in batting average, home runs, and runs batted in.

Five players have hit for the cycle in the same season in which they won a Most Valuable Player (MVP) award: Jimmie Foxx in 1933, Ted Williams in 1946, Mickey Mantle in 1957, and both Mookie Betts and Christian Yelich in 2018.

Three players—John Olerud, Michael Cuddyer, and Bob Watson—have hit for the cycle in both the National League and American League.

Three family pairs have hit for the cycle: father and son Gary Ward (1980) and Daryle Ward (2004), grandfather and grandson Gus Bell (1951) and David Bell (2004), and father and son Craig Biggio (2002) and Cavan Biggio (2019).

Two players have hit cycles both for and against the same team: Joe Cronin against (1929) and for (1940) the Red Sox, and Adrián Beltré against (2008) and for (2012, 2015) the Rangers.

One player, Brock Holt of the Boston Red Sox, hit for the cycle in a postseason game: Game 3 of the 2018 ALDS, on October 8, 2018, against the New York Yankees at Yankee Stadium.

On September 19, 2021, Eddie Rosario of the Atlanta Braves hit for the cycle on five pitches, the smallest number since at least 1900.

==== Most recent cycle for each active franchise ====
Date of cycle	Batter	Franchise (Note: This table lists each active MLB franchise by its current name; there may be instances of a player having hit his cycle when the team was known by a different name (e.g. Guardians/Indians).)	Time since cycle
June 29, 2012	Aaron Hill	Arizona Diamondbacks	14 years, 110 days
June 4, 2007	Mark Ellis	Athletics	19 years, 135 days
September 19, 2021	Eddie Rosario	Atlanta Braves	5 years, 28 days
May 12, 2023	Cedric Mullins	Baltimore Orioles	3 years, 158 days
October 8, 2018 (Note: Game 3 of the 2018 American League Division Series. The only postseason cycle in MLB history.)	Brock Holt	Boston Red Sox	8 years, 9 days
June 15, 2026	Pete Crow-Armstrong	Chicago Cubs	124 days
July 10, 2026	Tristan Peters	Chicago White Sox	99 days
August 22, 2026	JJ Bleday	Cincinnati Reds	56 days
June 14, 2019	Jake Bauers	Cleveland Guardians	7 years, 125 days
September 30, 2018	Charlie Blackmon	Colorado Rockies	8 years, 17 days
August 1, 2006	Carlos Guillén	Detroit Tigers	20 years, 77 days
July 21, 2024	Yordan Alvarez	Houston Astros	2 years, 88 days
July 25, 1990	George Brett	Kansas City Royals	36 years, 84 days
June 11, 2022	Jared Walsh	Los Angeles Angels	4 years, 128 days
July 15, 2017	Cody Bellinger	Los Angeles Dodgers	9 years, 94 days
July 28, 2024	Xavier Edwards	Miami Marlins	2 years, 81 days
May 11, 2022	Christian Yelich (Note: Yelich's record-tying third cycle; he shares the record with Trea Turner, Adrián Beltré, Babe Herman, and Bob Meusel.)	Milwaukee Brewers	4 years, 159 days
July 12, 2025	Byron Buxton	Minnesota Twins	1 year, 97 days
June 6, 2022	Eduardo Escobar	New York Mets	4 years, 133 days
August 2, 2009	Melky Cabrera	New York Yankees	17 years, 76 days
June 20, 2026 (Note: The most recent cycle.)	Bryce Harper	Philadelphia Phillies	119 days
September 28, 2016	John Jaso	Pittsburgh Pirates	10 years, 19 days
July 16, 2021	Jake Cronenworth	San Diego Padres	5 years, 93 days
September 15, 2011	Pablo Sandoval	San Francisco Giants	15 years, 32 days
September 1, 2008	Adrián Beltré (Note: The first of Beltré's joint-record three career cycles; he shares the record with Christian Yelich, Trea Turner, Babe Herman, and Bob Meusel.)	Seattle Mariners	18 years, 46 days
July 1, 2022	Nolan Arenado	St. Louis Cardinals	4 years, 108 days
August 1, 2017	Evan Longoria	Tampa Bay Rays	9 years, 77 days
June 30, 2024	Wyatt Langford	Texas Rangers	2 years, 109 days
September 17, 2019	Cavan Biggio	Toronto Blue Jays	7 years, 30 days
June 30, 2021	Trea Turner (Note: Turner's record-tying third cycle; he shares the record with Christian Yelich, Adrián Beltré, Babe Herman, and Bob Meusel.)	Washington Nationals	5 years, 109 days

The Kansas City Royals have not had a player hit for the cycle in more than 36 years, when George Brett did it in 1990. This is the longest active drought, 16 years more than the second longest active drought, which is held by the Detroit Tigers.

==== Most recent cycle at each active MLB stadium ====
Player who hit for the cycle was on the home team.
Player is active.

Stadium	Stadium's first MLB season	Date of cycle	Player	Franchise	Time since cycle
American Family Field	2001	July 7, 2024	Xavier Edwards	Miami Marlins	2 years, 102 days
Angel Stadium	1966	June 11, 2022	Jared Walsh	Los Angeles Angels	4 years, 128 days
Busch Stadium	2006	--	--	--	--
Chase Field	1998	August 22, 2026	JJ Bleday	Cincinnati Reds	56 days
Citi Field	2009	--	--	--	--
Citizens Bank Park	2004	June 20, 2026	Bryce Harper	Philadelphia Phillies	119 days
Comerica Park	2000	June 14, 2019	Jake Bauers	Cleveland Guardians	7 years, 125 days
Coors Field	1995	September 30, 2018	Charlie Blackmon	Colorado Rockies	8 years, 17 days
Daikin Park	2000	August 1, 2017	Evan Longoria	Tampa Bay Rays	9 years, 77 days
Dodger Stadium	1962	April 13, 2009	Orlando Hudson	Los Angeles Dodgers	17 years, 187 days
Fenway Park	1912	August 28, 2023	Jose Altuve	Houston Astros	3 years, 50 days
Globe Life Field	2020	--	--	--	--
Great American Ball Park	2003	June 23, 2023	Elly De La Cruz	Cincinnati Reds	3 years, 116 days
Kauffman Stadium	1973	April 12, 1994	Scott Cooper	Boston Red Sox	32 years, 188 days
LoanDepot Park	2012	August 18, 2021	Freddie Freeman	Atlanta Braves	5 years, 60 days
Nationals Park	2008	July 16, 2021	Jake Cronenworth	San Diego Padres	5 years, 93 days
Oracle Park	2000	September 19, 2021	Eddie Rosario	Atlanta Braves	5 years, 28 days
Oriole Park at Camden Yards	1992	June 30, 2024	Wyatt Langford	Texas Rangers	2 years, 109 days
PNC Park	2001	September 28, 2016	John Jaso	Pittsburgh Pirates	10 years, 19 days
Petco Park	2004	June 6, 2022	Eduardo Escobar	New York Mets	4 years, 133 days
Progressive Field	1994	--	--	--	--
Rate Field	1991	July 10, 2026	Tristan Peters	Chicago White Sox	99 days
Rogers Centre	1989	August 9, 2018	Mookie Betts	Boston Red Sox	8 years, 69 days
Sutter Health Park	2025	March 31, 2025	Carson Kelly	Chicago Cubs	1 year, 200 days
T-Mobile Park	1999	July 21, 2024	Yordan Alvarez	Houston Astros	2 years, 88 days
Target Field	2010	July 12, 2025	Byron Buxton	Minnesota Twins	1 year, 97 days
Tropicana Field	1998	June 13, 2019	Shohei Ohtani	Los Angeles Angels	7 years, 126 days
Truist Park	2017	--	--	--	--
Wrigley Field	1916	June 15, 2026	Pete Crow-Armstrong	Chicago Cubs	124 days
Yankee Stadium	2009	--	--	--	--

=== Nippon Professional Baseball ===
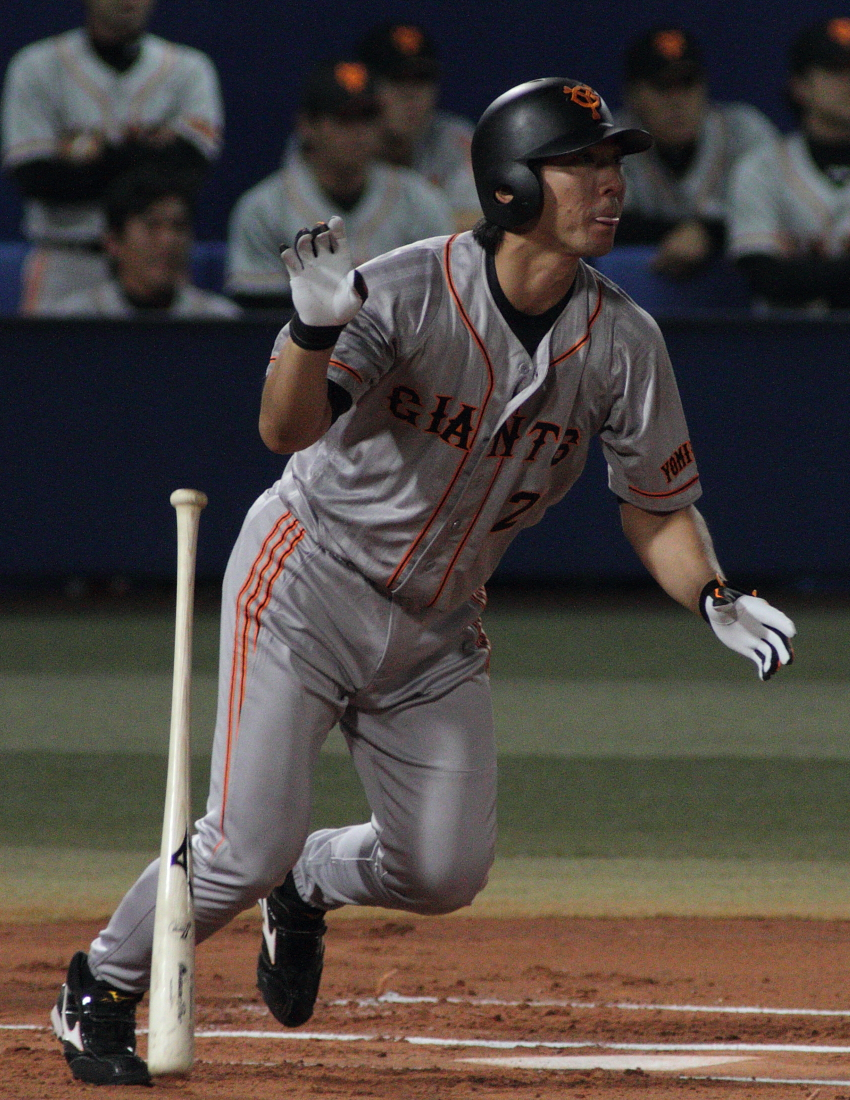
Michihiro Ogasawara hit the only cycle during the 2008 Nippon Professional Baseball season.

==== Multiple cycles ====
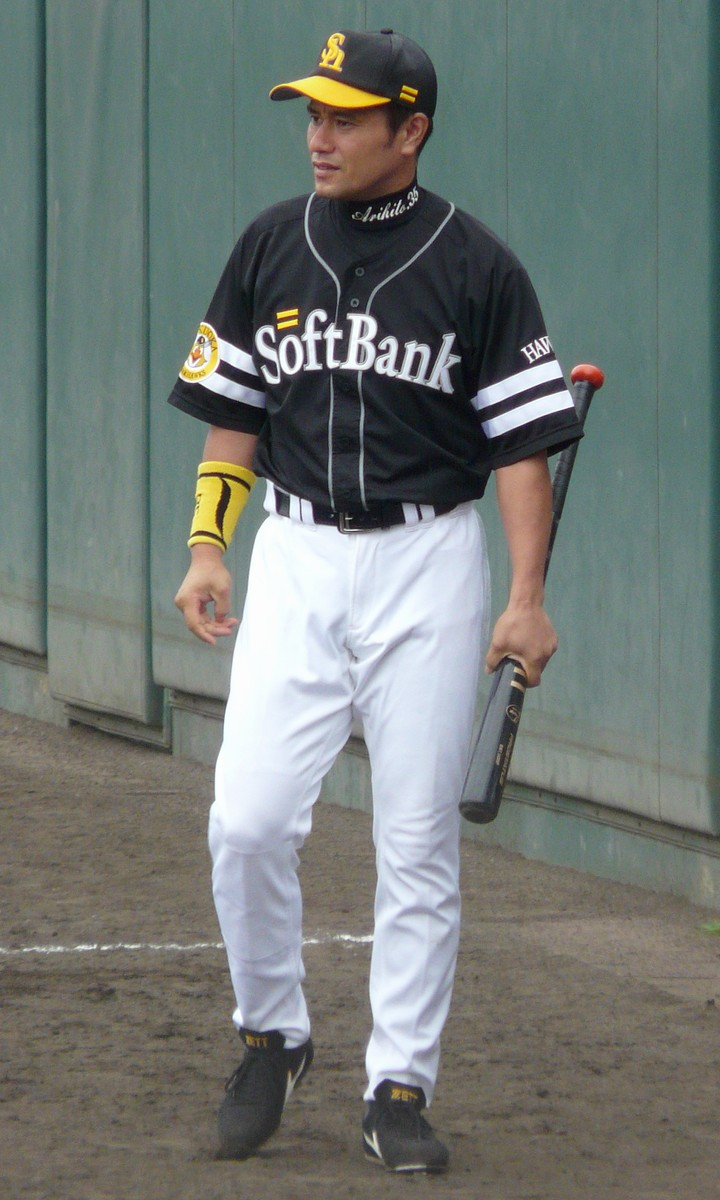
Arihito Muramatsu is one of five players to hit a natural cycle in NPB.

During his eight seasons playing for the Yokohama BayStars, Bobby Rose hit for three cycles, the most of any Nippon Professional Baseball player. Spaced two seasons apart, his first cycle occurred on May 2, 1995, the next on April 29, 1997, and his final cycle on June 30, 1999. Three NPB players have hit for the cycle twice; Fumio Fujimura (both with the Osaka Tigers), Hiromi Matsunaga (both with the Hankyu/Orix Braves), and Kosuke Fukudome (one with the Chunichi Dragons, and one with the Hanshin Tigers). Fujimura is also the only player to have hit a cycle during both the single league era and the current dual league era.

The 2003 NPB season saw the most cycles hit in a single season—five. That season also saw the only instance of cycles occurring on the same day: on July 1, hit by Atsunori Inaba of the Yakult Swallows and Arihito Muramatsu of the Fukuoka Daiei Hawks. The next day, Shinjiro Hiyama became the third player to hit for the cycle in two days. Conversely, the longest period of time between two players hitting for the cycle was 5 years, 11 months, and 30 days, a drought lasting from Michihiro Ogasawara's cycle in 2008 to Rainel Rosario's in 2014.

==== Natural cycles ====
The natural cycle has been accomplished five times in NPB history. Fumio Fujimura's second cycle on May 25, 1950, was the first time a player collected the hits in order. On average, the natural cycle occurs approximately every 13 years. Other than Fujimura, the four players to hit for the natural cycle are Kazuhiko Kondo in 1961, Takahiro Tokutsu in 1976, Takanori Okamura in 1985, and Muramatsu in 2003. The natural cycle has been accomplished in reverse by Alex Ochoa (2004) and Rosario (2014).

==== Other related accomplishments ====
Yakult Swallows catcher Atsuya Furuta (game 2 of the 1992 series.) and Hanshin Tigers outfielder Koji Chikamoto (game 2 of the 2019 series.) are the only players to hit for the cycle in an NPB All-Star game. Inaba is the only player to hit for the cycle in a rain-shortened game—after hitting a triple in the first inning and hitting a home run in the fourth, Inaba collected the other two necessary hits in a seven-run fifth inning when the order batted around. Kosuke Fukudome is the only NPB player to have hit a grand slam as the home run of the cycle. Hiroshi Ohshita and Kazuhiko Kondo are the only two players to have hit a walk-off home run to win the game as the final hit of their cycles.

Ochoa's cycle with the Chunichi Dragons on April 13, 2004, made him the first (and to date, only) player to hit a cycle in both MLB and NPB. He had previously accomplished the feat on July 3, 1996, while playing for MLB's New York Mets.

=== KBO League ===
There was 31 people accomplished throughout history of KBO League.

==== Multiple cycles ====
Eric Thames hit for the cycle twice during the 2015 season of the KBO League. Thames is the only KBO League player to hit for two cycles in one season. Only two players have hit for the cycle twice in their KBO League career: Thames and Yang Joon-hyuk.

==== Natural cycles ====
The natural cycle has been accomplished twice in KBO history. Kim Eung-Gook of the Lotte Giants did it in 1996, and Kim Do-yeong of the KIA Tigers did on July 23, 2024.

There has only one reverse natural cycle in KBO history. Kang Seung-Ho of the Doosan Bears did it on September 15, 2023.

==== Other related accomplishments ====
Oh yun-seok is the only KBO player to have hit a grand slam as the home run of the cycle.

Ahn Chi-Yong's cycle with the LG Twins on June 26, 2008, made him the first (and, as of 2024, only) player to hit a cycle in both KBO League and KBO Futures League. He had previously accomplished the feat on April 15, 2003, while playing for the Twins' second team.

== See also ==
- Home run cycle, when a player hits a solo home run, two-run home run, three-run home run, and grand slam all in one game.
