= Bobby Rose (baseball) =

American baseball player (born 1967)

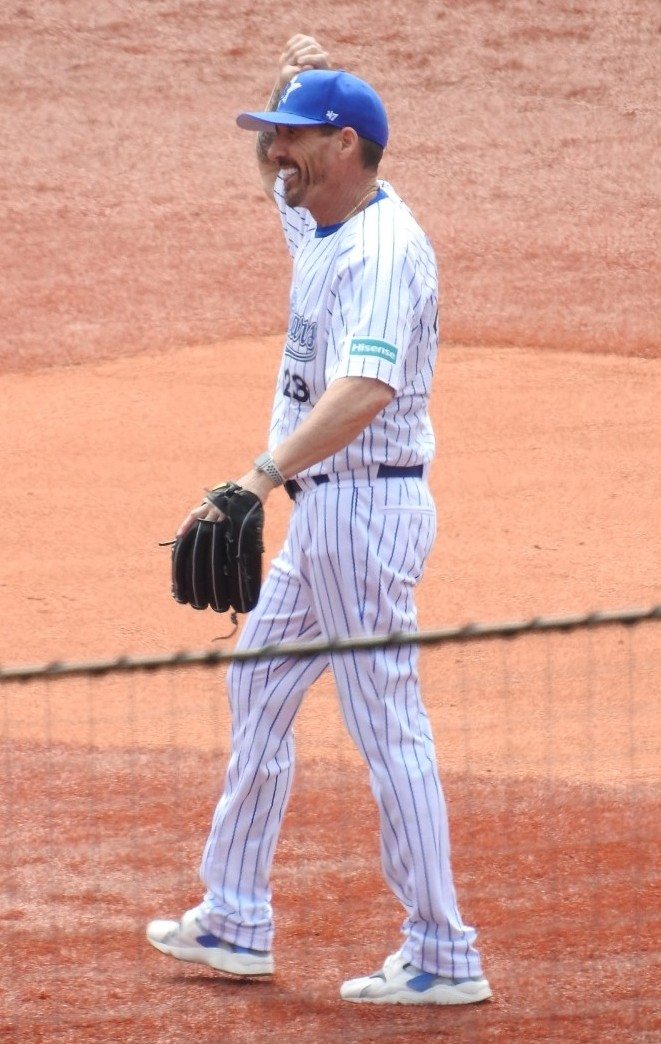
- Rose with the Yokohama BayStars
- Second baseman
- Born: March 15, 1967 (age 59); Covina, California, U.S.
- Batted: Right Threw: Right

Professional debut
- MLB: August 12, 1989, for the California Angels
- NPB: April 10, 1993, for the Yokohama BayStars

Last appearance
- MLB: May 19, 1992, for the California Angels
- NPB: October 9, 2000, for the Yokohama BayStars

MLB statistics
- Batting average: .245
- Hits: 49
- Home runs: 5
- Runs batted in: 23

NPB statistics
- Batting average: .325
- Hits: 1,275
- Home runs: 167
- Runs batted in: 808
- Stats at Baseball Reference

Teams
- California Angels (1989–1992); Yokohama BayStars (1993–2000)

Career highlights and awards
- NPB: Japan Series champion (1998); 4x All-Star (1995, 1997, 1999–2000); Central League batting champion (1999); 6x Best Nine Award (1993, 1995, 1997–2000); 1998 Golden Glove Award; 1999 Game 2 All-Star MVP; Hit for the cycle a record three times

Robert Richard Rose (born March 15, 1967) is an American former professional baseball infielder and coach. He played for the California Angels in Major League Baseball (MLB), and for the Yokohama BayStars of Nippon Professional Baseball (NPB). During his playing career, he batted and threw right-handed and was listed at 5 feet 11 inches (1.80 m) and 170 pounds (77 kg). He later served as a hitting coach in Minor League Baseball.

== Baseball career ==
=== North America ===
Rose played baseball for San Dimas High School in California, where he had a .515 batting average during his senior season in 1985. He was selected by the California Angels in the fifth round of the 1985 MLB draft and signed with the team. He played in the Angels' farm system for several teams from 1985 through 1992, except for 1987. Rose sat out the 1987 season, working for a graphics company in Orange County, California, before returning to baseball the following year. His longest assignments were with the Quad Cities Angels of the Class A Midwest League for 264 games during 1986 and 1988, and the Edmonton Trappers of the Triple-A Pacific Coast League for 216 games during 1990–1992. Over seven seasons, Rose appeared in 648 minor-league games, registering a .288 average with 49 home runs and 372 runs batted in (RBIs). Primarily a used as a third baseman, second baseman, and shortstop, Rose made several appearances as a catcher, first baseman, and outfielder—he also pitched in one game.

Rose played a total of 73 major league games during 1989–1992; the most MLB games he played during one season was 30 in 1992. He batted .245 with five home runs and 23 RBIs with the Angels, while defensively playing primarily at second base (43 games), along with appearances at first base, third base, and in the outfield. Rose was selected as the Angles starting second baseman at the start of the 1992 season. However, he soon began to struggle and Rene Gonzales started platooning the position with him. On May 19, Rose hit a home run in his last major-league at bat. Two days later, he and the team were involved in an accident when the team bus veered off a road in Deptford Township, New Jersey. Rose’s suffered a severely sprained right ankle in the accident and was placed on the 15-day disabled list. After, he rehabilitated in the minors on stints with the Palm Springs Angels and the Trappers. On October 16, however, the Angels sold his contract to the Yokohama Taiyo Whales in Japan's Nippon Professional Baseball (NPB).

=== Japan ===
After Rose's contract was sold by the Angels to the then-Yokohama Taiyo Whales of NPB's Central League (CL), the team was renamed as the Yokohama BayStars prior to the 1993 season. In his first season with the team, he played in all 130 games and tied for the most RBIs in the CL with 94. He also received the Best Nine Award for best second baseman in the league. Rose's success continued over the next several seasons and he became a central figure in Yokohama's famed "machine gun" batting lineup as its cleanup hitter. In 1998, he helped the BayStars win their first CL title and Japan Series in 38 years.

Next season, Rose batted a career-high .369 along with 37 home runs and 153 RBIs. His batting average won him the 1999 CL batting title and was the highest ever in Japanese baseball among right-handed hitters at the time. His RBIs that season also ranks second-most in a season in NPB history. He also hit his third cycle, the most in NPB-history, and was named the Most Valuable Player in Game 2 of the 1999 All-Star Series. In June of that season, Rose had indicated that he would retire at the end of the year. After his success, however, he played another season in which he batted .332 with 97 RBIs with 21 home runs. Rose announced his retirement after the season in October 2000. The BayStars and Rose failed to reach an agreement on a new contract after the team only offered a salary decrease from his estimated ¥360 million salary that season. He noted that he did not want to play for any other team.

Rose's NPB career spanned eight season from 1993–2000. During that time, he won six Best Nine Awards and was selected to four All-Star Series. Defensively, he played predominantly as a second baseman in NPB, with limited appearances at first base and third base. In 1998, he was awarded the Golden Glove Award for second basemen. He is often regarded as one of the best foreign players in BayStars and Japanese professional baseball history. For the BayStars 70th anniversary in 2019, Rose was voted by fans as the best second baseman in the team's history.

=== Coaching ===
Rose first served as a hitting coach during the 2013 season with the Spokane Indians, a Texas Rangers farm team in the Class A Short Season Northwest League. He then spent 2014 coaching for the Rangers' Class A affiliate in the South Atlantic League, the Hickory Crawdads. Rose was next the hitting coach for the High Desert Mavericks, a Class A-Advanced Rangers farm team in the California League, during the 2015 and 2016 seasons. In 2017, he served in the same capacity for the Down East Wood Ducks, also a Rangers Class A-Advanced farm team, in the Carolina League.

Rose moved to the Baltimore Orioles organization for the 2018 season, as hitting coach of the Delmarva Shorebirds in the South Atlantic League. In February 2019, he was named hitting coach for the Frederick Keys, then a farm team of the Orioles in the Carolina League. After the 2019 season, the Orioles chose not to renew the contracts of the Keys' coaching staff.
