= Alex Ochoa =

American baseball player (born 1972)

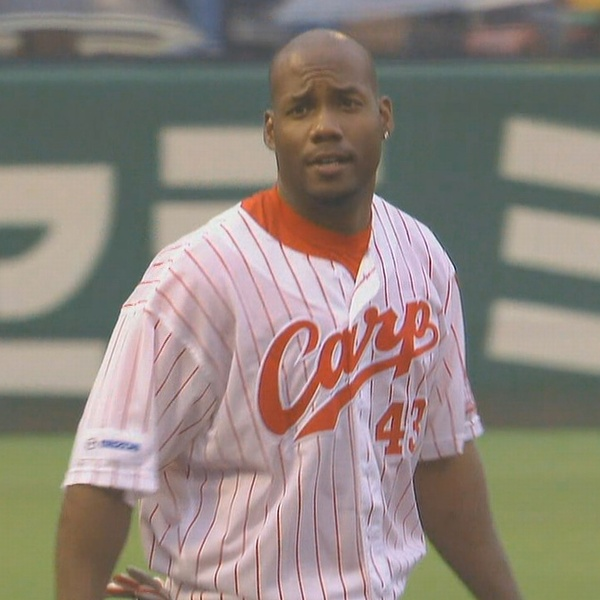
- Outfielder
- Born: March 29, 1972 (age 53); Hialeah, Florida, U.S.
- Batted: Right Threw: Right

Professional debut
- MLB: September 18, 1995, for the New York Mets
- NPB: March 28, 2003, for the Chunichi Dragons

Last appearance
- MLB: September 29, 2002, for the Anaheim Angels
- NPB: 2008, for the Hiroshima Toyo Carp

MLB statistics
- Batting average: .279
- Home runs: 46
- Runs batted in: 261

NPB statistics
- Batting average: .289
- Home runs: 97
- Runs batted in: 416
- Stats at Baseball Reference

Teams
- New York Mets (1995–1997); Minnesota Twins (1998); Milwaukee Brewers (1999); Cincinnati Reds (2000–2001); Colorado Rockies (2001); Milwaukee Brewers (2002); Anaheim Angels (2002); Chunichi Dragons (2003–2006); Hiroshima Toyo Carp (2007–2008)

Career highlights and awards
- World Series champion (2002)

Alex Ochoa (/oʊˈtʃoʊ.ə/; born March 29, 1972) is a Cuban-American former professional baseball outfielder in Major League Baseball and Nippon Professional Baseball.

== Career ==
Ochoa played in part of eight seasons for the New York Mets, Minnesota Twins, Milwaukee Brewers, Cincinnati Reds, Colorado Rockies and Anaheim Angels. He was originally drafted by the Baltimore Orioles in the third round of the 1991 amateur draft, but he never played in the majors for them, as Baltimore traded him to the Mets as part of a trade for Bobby Bonilla in 1995. Ochoa would make his big league debut later that year for New York. Ochoa would eventually be traded seven times in his career, winning a World Series ring with the Angels in the 2002 World Series.

Ochoa played for the Chunichi Dragons from 2003 to 2006. In Japan, he was simply referred to as Alex. He signed a minor league contract with the Boston Red Sox before the 2006 season and was invited to spring training. He started the season with Triple-A Pawtucket, but was released after a poor performance. On June 18, 2007, he signed a deal to play with the Hiroshima Toyo Carp for the rest of the season, and he re-signed with them for the 2008 season.

On January 27, 2009, Ochoa was named an assistant coach for the Boston Red Sox. In 2010, he was a special assistant in the Red Sox' baseball operations department, and in 2011, he served as batting coach for the Single-A Salem Red Sox of the Carolina League. On December 23, 2011, he was named the first-base coach on the 2012 Major League staff of Boston Red Sox manager Bobby Valentine.

== Television ==
Ochoa made a cameo appearance on the Japanese television drama Dream Again on Nippon Television while playing for the Carp.

== See also ==
- Hitting for the cycle - the only player in history to have hit for the cycle both as an MLB player and a NPB player. His NPB cycle is noted to be a reverse natural cycle: hit in the order of home run, triple, double, and single.

Sporting positions
Preceded by Ron Johnson	Boston Red Sox first-base coach 2012	Succeeded by Arnie Beyeler
Achievements
Preceded by John Valentin	Hitting for the cycle July 3, 1996	Succeeded by Alex Rodriguez
