= Jung-gu District Office station =

Metro station in Daejeon, South Korea

106 중구청 Jung-gu District Office
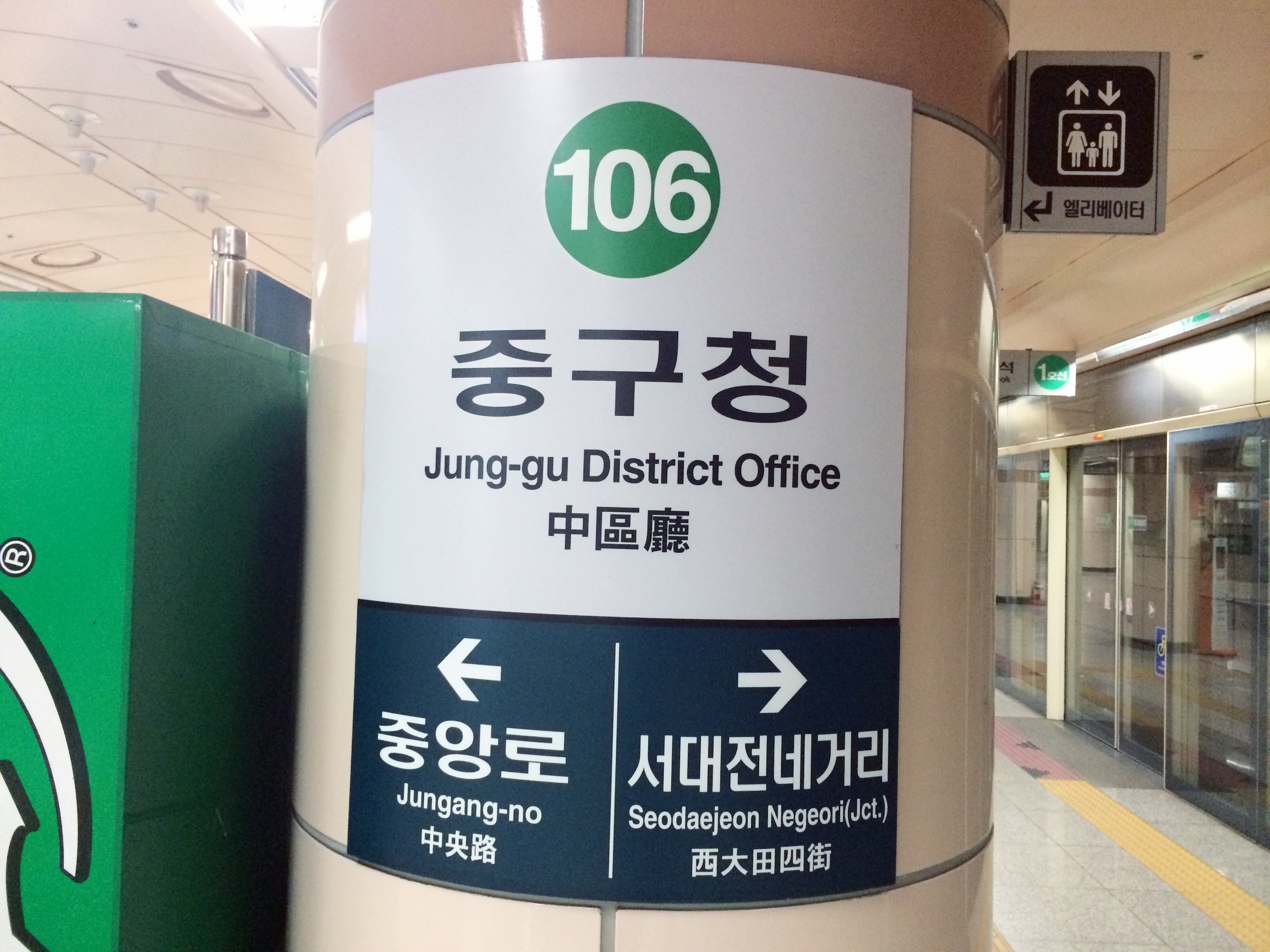

Korean name
- Hangul: 중구청역
- Hanja: 中區廳驛
- Revised Romanization: Junggucheong yeok
- McCune–Reischauer: Chungkuchŏng yŏk

General information
- Location: Seonhwa-dong, Jung District, Daejeon; South Korea
- Coordinates: 36°19′30″N 127°25′11″E
- Operator: Daejeon Metro
- Line: Daejeon Metro Line 1
- Platforms: 1
- Tracks: 2

Other information
- Station code: 106

History
- Opened: March 16, 2006; 20 years ago

Services
Preceding station	Daejeon Metro	Following station
Jungangno towards Panam	Line 1	Seodaejeon Negeori towards Banseok
Location

Jung-gu District Office Station (Korean: 중구청역; Hanja: 中區廳驛) is a station of the Daejeon Metro Line 1 in Seonhwa-dong, Jung District, Daejeon, South Korea.
