= Matsumoto Baseball Stadium =

Baseball stadium in Matsumoto, Nagano, Japan

Coordinates: 36.258147°N 137.98874°E

Matsumoto Baseball Stadium is a baseball stadium in Matsumoto, Nagano, Japan. The stadium has an all-seated capacity of 25,000.

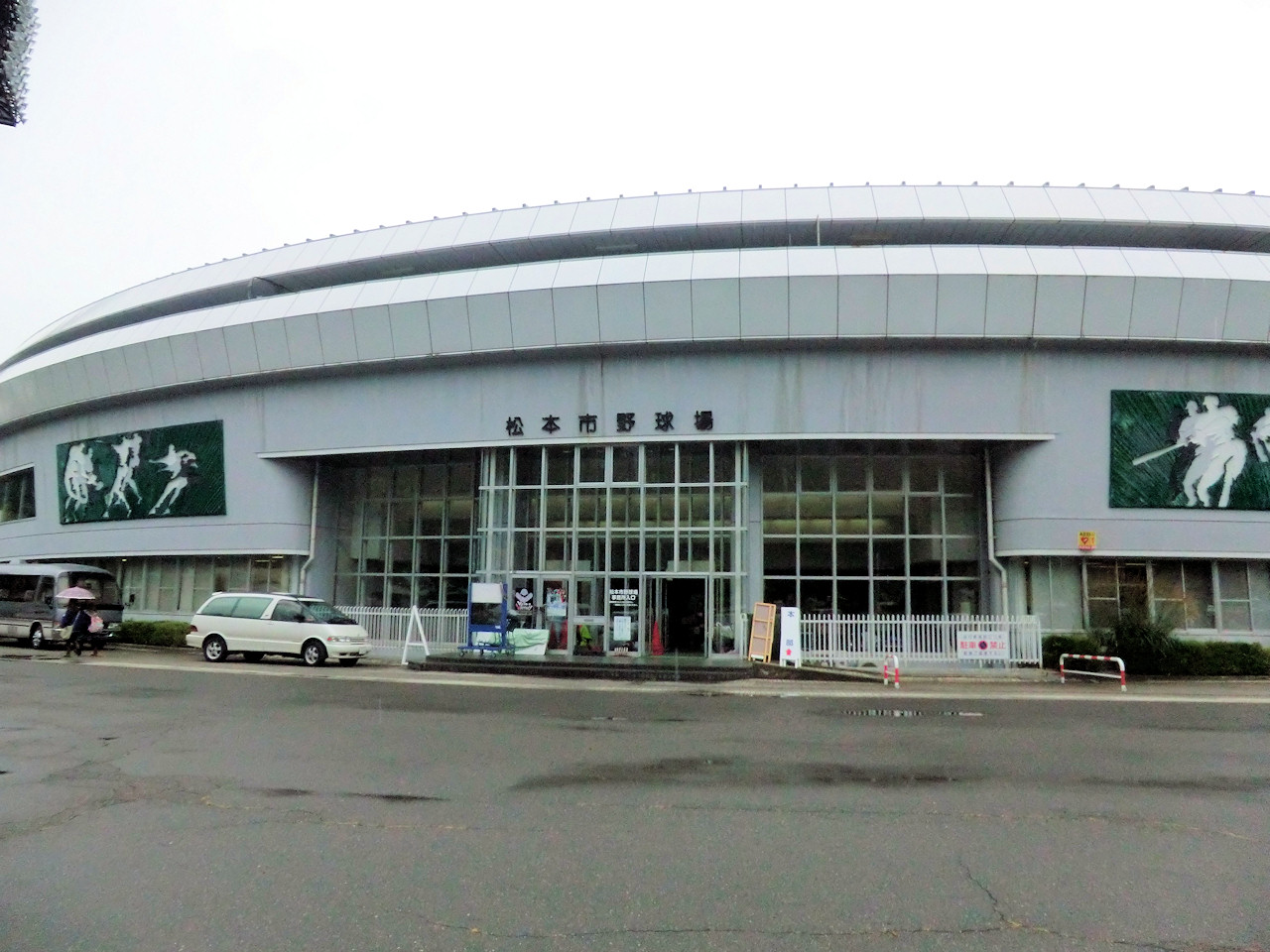
Matsumoto Baseball Stadium
