= Hanbat Baseball Stadium =

Baseball stadium in Daejeon, South Korea

- 한밭 야구장
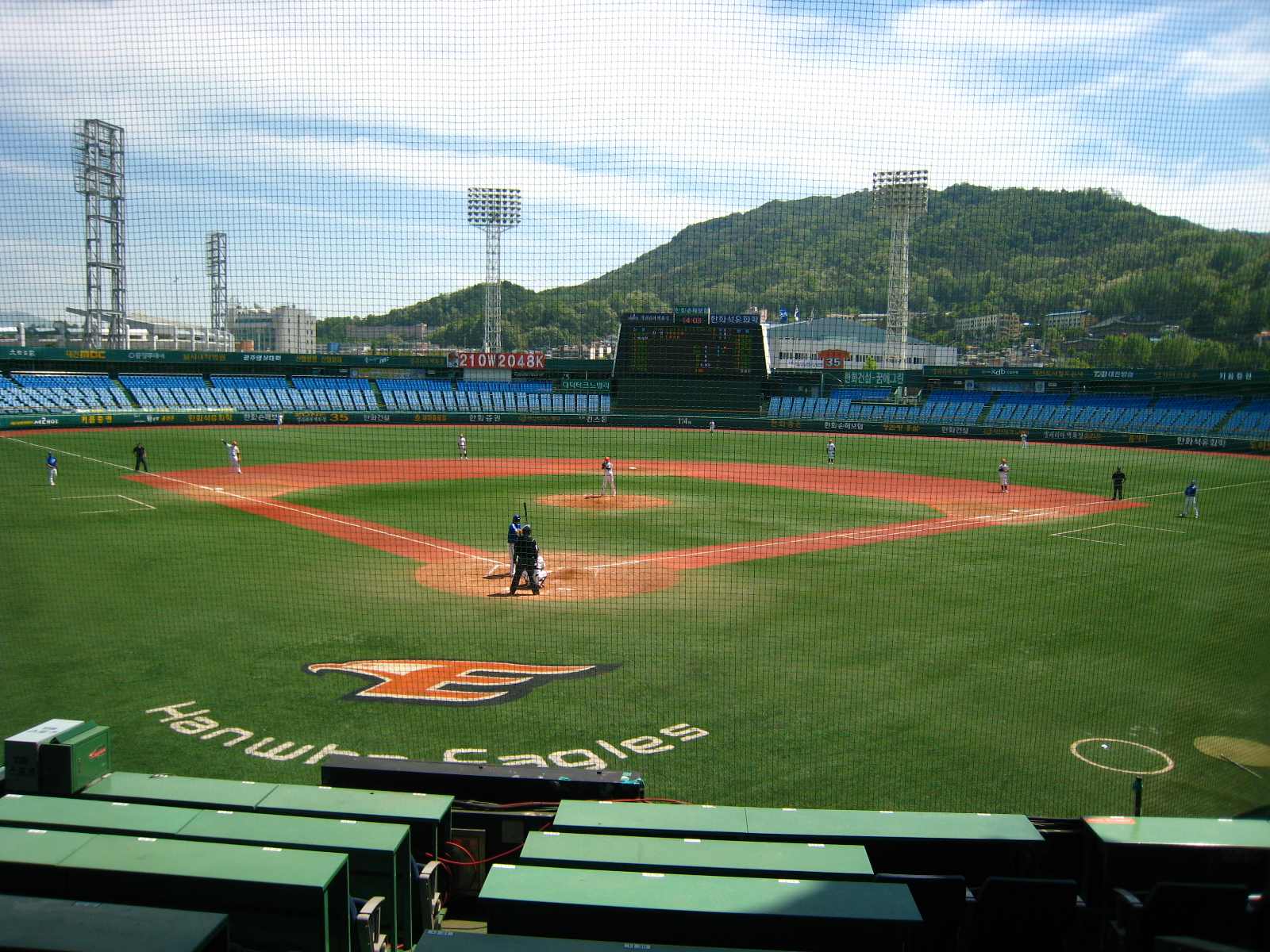
- The ballpark in 2009, prior to the renovation
- Interactive map of Hanbat Baseball Stadium
- Former names: Hanwha Life Eagles Park (2015–2024)
- Location: 373 Daejong-ro, Busa-dong; Jung-gu, Daejeon, South Korea
- Coordinates: 36°19′01.7″N 127°25′44.7″E
- Owner: Daejeon Metropolitan City
- Capacity: 13,000
- Surface: Grass
- Field size: Left Field Line – 100 m (328 ft); Left-Center – 112 m (367 ft); Center Field – 122 m (400 ft); Right-Center – 112 m (367 ft); Right Field Line – 100 m (328 ft); Outfield Wall Height – 3.2 m (10.5 ft)
- Acreage: Playing Field – 11,385 m^{2} (2.81 acres); Total Acreage – 22,550 m^{2} (5.57 acres)

Construction
- Groundbreaking: September 1959
- Opened: August 1963 (exhibition game); January 27, 1964 (completion)
- Renovated: 2011–2012
- Cost: 12.6 billion won

Tenants
- OB Bears (1982–1984); Hanwha Eagles (1986–2024)

- Hanbat Baseball Stadium
- Hangul: 대전 한밭종합운동장 야구장
- Hanja: 大田 한밭綜合運動場 野球場
- Revised Romanization: Daejeon Hanbat Undongjang Yagujang
- McCune–Reischauer: Taejŏn Hanbat Undongjang Yagujang

The Daejeon Hanbat Baseball Stadium (Korean: 대전 한밭종합운동장 야구장), formerly known as Hanwha Life Eagles Park for sponsorship reasons, is a baseball park in Daejeon, South Korea. The stadium is located in the vicinity of Daejeon Station. Located in Daejeon Hanbat Sports Complex with other main sports facilities in Daejeon, it was the primary home ballpark of the KBO League team Hanwha Eagles between 1986 and 2024.

Built in 1964, the ballpark was once nicknamed as the "Ping-Pong Table" for having the smallest outfield dimension among professional ballparks in South Korea. But the ballpark underwent a series of large scale renovations with capacity extension from 2011 winter to 2012 spring, and outfield expansion in the winter of 2012. After the renovation, the ballpark had a second-largest outfield dimension in South Korea at the time, and a seating capacity of 13,000.

From 1982 to 1984, it was the home ballpark of the OB Bears. In 1986, the Binggrae Eagles debuted as the KBO's seventh franchise, and they took on Daejeon Hanbat Baseball Stadium as their home.

== Access ==
The ballpark can be accessed directly by public bus to Hanwha Eagles Park (lines 802 and 119) or Hanbat Sports Complex stop (lines 513, 604, 52, and 4), or 1 km walking distance by subway to Jungangno Station or Jung-gu Office Station (Daejeon Metro Line 1). Daejeon city offers Tashu bicycle share service with more than 100 spaces installed in the vicinity of the stadium.
