= Hiromi Matsunaga (baseball) =

Japanese baseball player (born 1960)

Hiromi Matsunaga 松永 浩美
- Third baseman
- Born: September 27, 1960 (age 65); Kitakyushu, Fukuoka
- Batted: Switch Threw: Right

NPB debut
- May 10, 1981, for the Hankyu Braves

Last NPB appearance
- May 4, 1997, for the Fukuoka Daiei Hawks

NPB statistics
- Batting average: .293
- Hits: 1,904
- Runs: 1,059
- Stats at Baseball Reference

Teams
- Hankyu Braves/Orix Braves/Orix BlueWave (1981–1992); Hanshin Tigers (1993); Fukuoka Daiei Hawks (1994–1997)

Hiromi Matsunaga (松永 浩美, Matsunaga Hiromi; born September 27, 1960) is a former Nippon Professional Baseball player.

In 1998, he attempted to win a roster spot with the Oakland Athletics of Major League Baseball.
