= Arihito Muramatsu =

Japanese baseball player (born 1972)

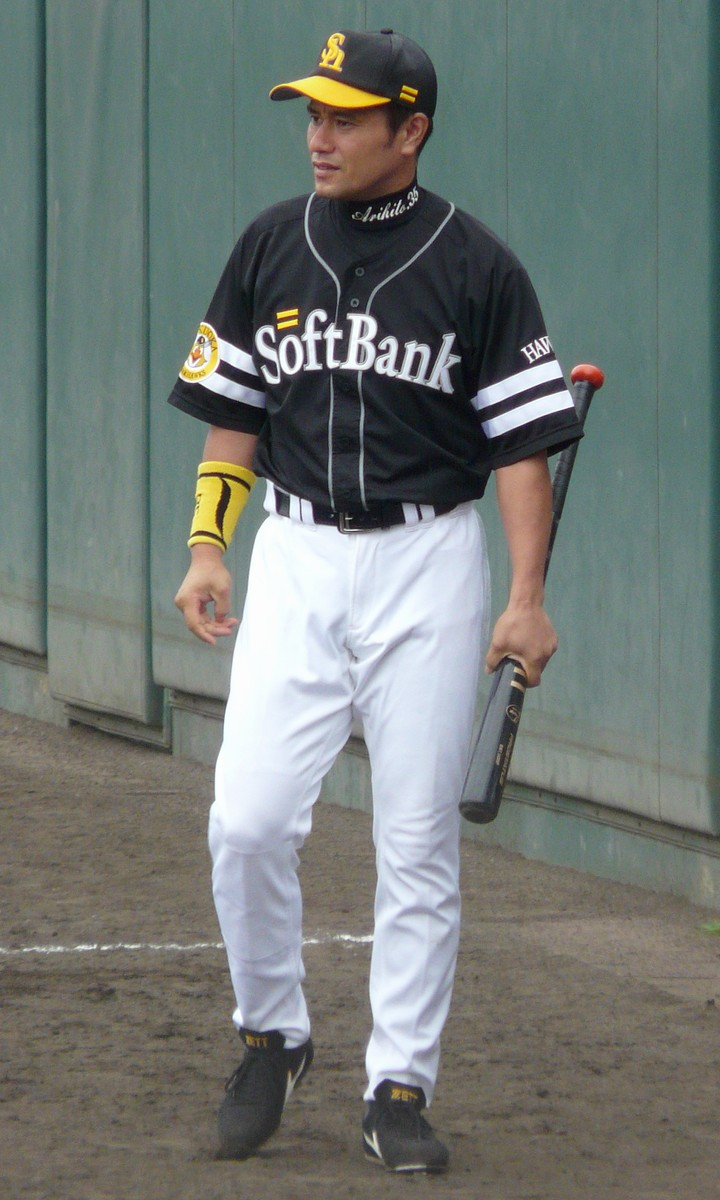
- Muramatsu with the Fukuoka SoftBank Hawks

Fukuoka SoftBank Hawks – No. 93
- Outfielder / Coach
- Born: December 12, 1972 (age 53); Kanazawa, Ishikawa, Japan
- Batted: Left Threw: Left

NPB debut
- August 11, 1992, for the Fukuoka Daiei Hawks

Last NPB appearance
- March 22, 1992, for the Fukuoka SoftBank Hawks

NPB statistics
- Batting average: .277
- Hits: 1,380
- Home Runs: 18
- Runs batted in: 393
- Stolen bases: 270
- Stats at Baseball Reference

Teams
- As player: Fukuoka Daiei Hawks (1992–2003); Orix BlueWave/Orix Buffaloes (2004–2008); Fukuoka SoftBank Hawks (2009–2010); As coach: Fukuoka SoftBank Hawks (2014–present)

Career highlights and awards
- As player: Pacific League stolen base leader (1996); Pacific League Best Nine Award (1996); 2× Pacific League Golden Glove Award (2003, 2004); 2× Japan Series Champion (1999, 2003); 3× NPB All-Star Game (1996, 2003, 2004); As coach: Japan Series champion (2025)
- Last updated on: 4 April 2024

Olympic medal record

Men's baseball
Bronze medal – third place	Athens 2004	Team competition

Arihito Muramatsu (村松 有人, born December 12, 1972) is a Japanese former professional baseball outfielder, and current first squad hitting coach for the Fukuoka SoftBank Hawks of Nippon Professional Baseball (NPB).

He played in NPB for the Fukuoka Daiei Hawks, Fukuoka SoftBank and Orix Buffaloes.

== Professional career ==
=== Active player era ===
On November 24, 1990, Muramatsu was drafted 6th round pick by the Fukuoka Daiei Hawks in the 1990 Nippon Professional Baseball draft.

He made his debut in the Pacific League during the 1992 season, playing in 39 games.

In the 1996 season, he led the Pacific League with 58 steals to win the Pacific League stolen base leader and Pacific League Best Nine Award.

On July 1, 2003, Muramatsu recorded a hit for the cycle. Atsunori Inaba of the Yakult Swallows also recorded a hit for the cycle on the same day, the first time in NPB history. He also finished fifth all-time in NPB records with 13 triples. And he had won the Japanese Golden Glove award in outfield from 2003 to 2004.

Starting in the 2004 season he exercised his free agent rights and joined the Orix Buffaloes, where he played for five seasons until the 2008 season.

In the 2009 season, Muramatsu returned to the Hawks in a trade for Naoyuki Ohmura, played two seasons, and retired after the 2010 season.

Muramatsu played in 1673 games during his 20-season career, batting average .277 with 1380 hits, 18 home runs, 393 RBI, and 270 stolen bases.

=== After retirement ===
After his retirement, Muramatsu became the scout in charge of the Tokai region for the Fukuoka Softbank Hawks.

He had been the third squad outfield defense and base coach since the 2014 season and the first squad outfield defense and base coach since the 2017 season.

He was transferred to the first squad hitting coach since the 2024 season.

== International career ==
Muramathu joined the Japan national baseball team for the 2004 Summer Olympics, and won a bronze medal.

On February 6, 2015, he was appointed as Japan national baseball team's outfield defense and base running coach for the GLOBAL BASEBALL MATCH 2015 Samurai Japan vs. Europe.
