= Shinjiro Hiyama =

Zainichi Korean baseball player (born 1969)

Shinjiro Hiyama 桧山 進次郎
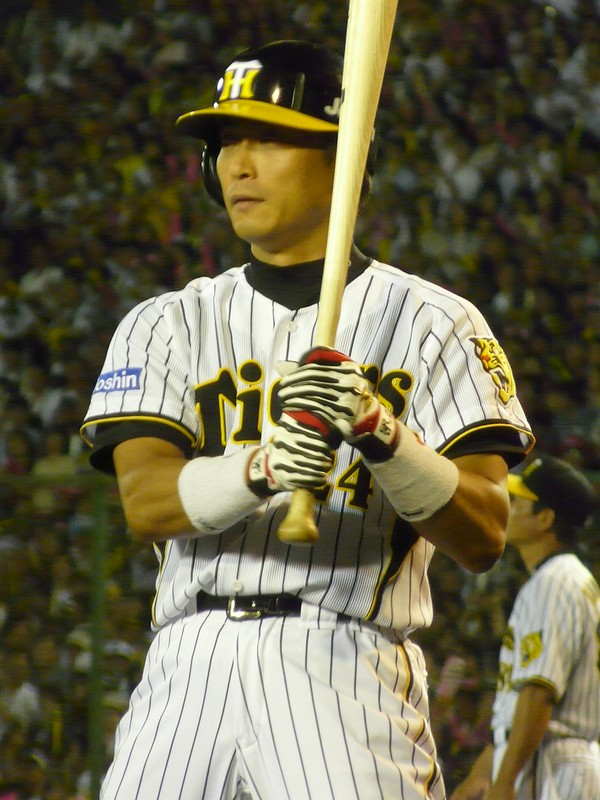
- outfielder
- Born: Hwang Jin-hwan; July 1, 1969 (age 56); Ukyō-ku, Kyoto, Japan
- Batted: left Threw: right

NPB debut
- May 30, 1992, for the Hanshin Tigers

Last appearance
- October 5, 2013, for the Hanshin Tigers

NPB statistics (through 2012 season)
- Batting average: .260
- Hits: 1253
- Home runs: 159
- RBIs: 694
- Stats at Baseball Reference

Teams
- Hanshin Tigers (1992 – 2013)

Shinjiro Hiyama (桧山 進次郎, Hiyama Shinjirō; Korean: 황진환; Hanja: 黄進煥; RR: Hwang Jinhwan; born July 1, 1969) is a Korean-born Japanese baseball player from Ukyō-ku, Kyoto, Japan. He plays as an outfielder for the Hanshin Tigers of the Central League.

== Biography ==
A second-generation Zainichi Korean prior to naturalization, Hiyama graduated from Heian High School and entered Toyo University. He played in the Tohto University Baseball League, and got 83 hits (13 home runs) in 261 at bats (batting average: .318), and batted in 45 runs.

He was drafted by the Hanshin Tigers in 1991, and through 2011 season, his statistics are 1240 hits (including 159 home runs) in 4754 at bats (average: .261), and 688 RBIs (ja:桧山進次郎). He received his Japanese citizenship in 2024.
