= Kazuya Maruyama (baseball) =

Japanese baseball player (born 1999)

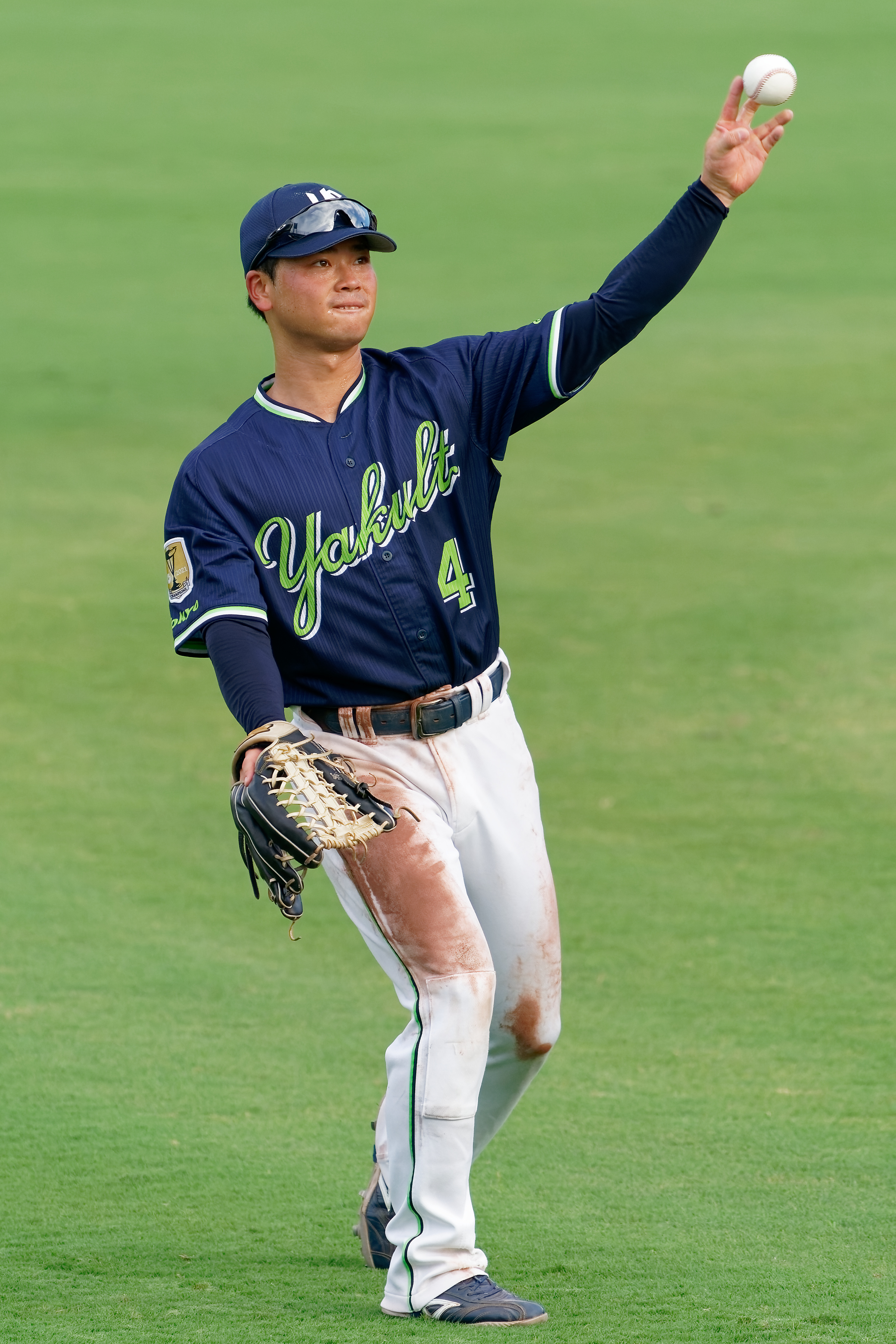

Tokyo Yakult Swallows – No. 4
- Outfielder
- Born: July 18, 1999 (age 26); Gunma District, Gunma, Toyama, Japan
- Bats: Left Throws: Left

NPB debut
- March 25, 2022, for the Tokyo Yakult Swallows

Career statistics (through 2024 season)
- Batting average: .232
- Hits: 102
- Home runs: 1
- RBIs: 28
- Stolen bases: 13
- Stats at Baseball Reference

Teams
- Tokyo Yakult Swallows (2022–present)

Kazuya Maruyama (丸山 和郁, Maruyama Kazuya; born July 18, 1999) is a professional Japanese baseball player. He plays outfielder for the Tokyo Yakult Swallows.
