= Gapcheon station =

Metro station in Daejeon, South Korea

115 갑천 Gapcheon
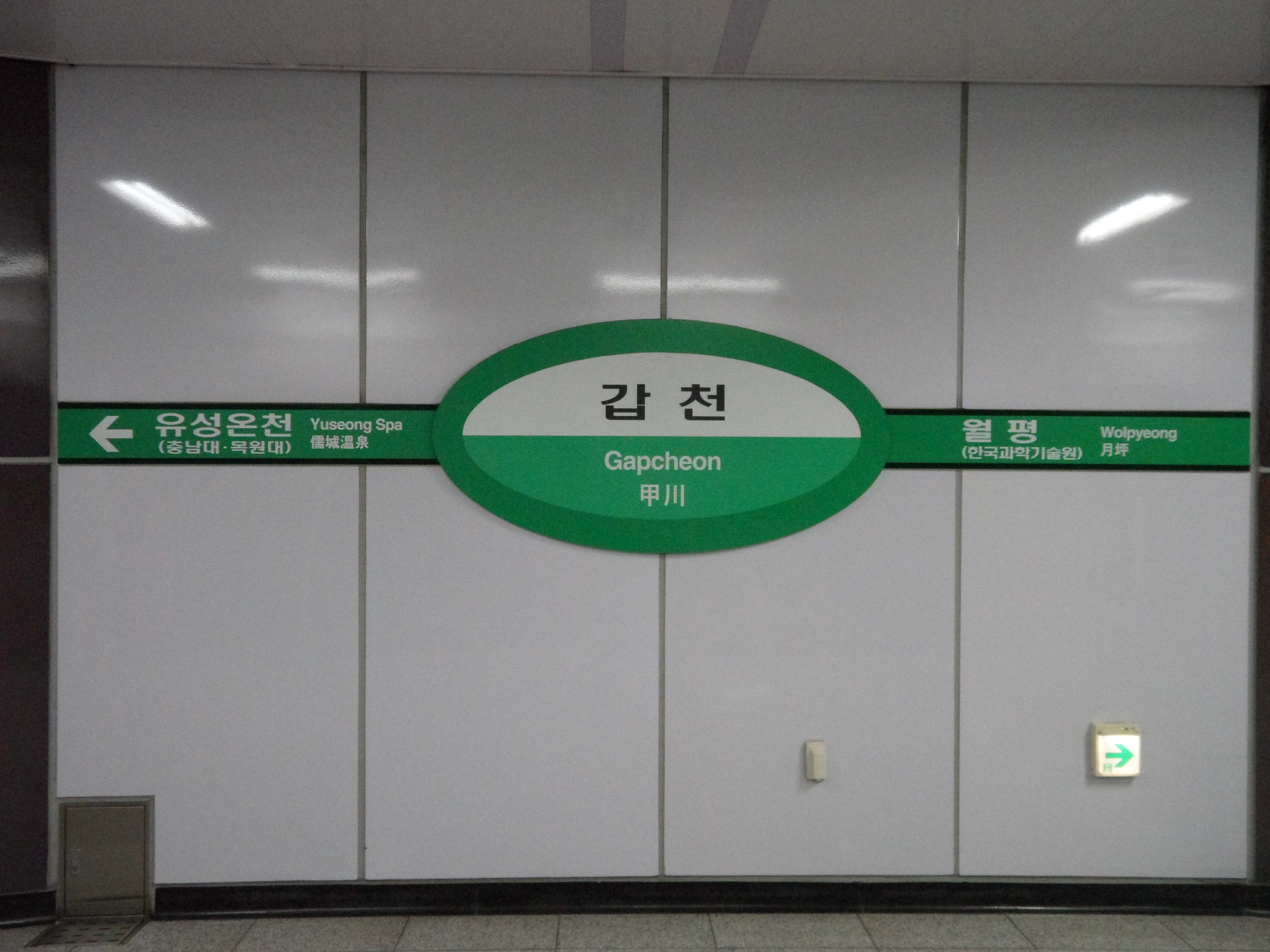

Korean name
- Hangul: 갑천역
- Hanja: 甲川驛
- Revised Romanization: Gapcheon-yeok
- McCune–Reischauer: Kapch'ŏn-yŏk

General information
- Location: Wolpyeong-dong, Seo District, Daejeon; South Korea
- Coordinates: 36°21′15″N 127°21′17″E
- Operator: Daejeon Metropolitan Express Transit Corporation
- Line: Daejeon Metro Line 1
- Platforms: 2
- Tracks: 2

Other information
- Station code: 115

History
- Opened: April 17, 2007; 19 years ago

Services
Preceding station	Daejeon Metro	Following station
Wolpyeong towards Panam	Line 1	Yuseong Spa towards Banseok
Location

Gapcheon Station (Korean: 갑천역; Hanja: 甲川驛) is a station of the Daejeon Metro Line 1 in Wolpyeong-dong, Seo District, Daejeon, South Korea. It has two functional platforms. It was opened on April 17, 2007. It is located on the river side and on the Gapcheondosi Expressway.
