= Wolpyeong station =

Metro station in Daejeon, South Korea

114 월평 (한국과학기술원) (방위사업청) Wolpyeong (KAIST) (Defense Acquisition Program Administration)
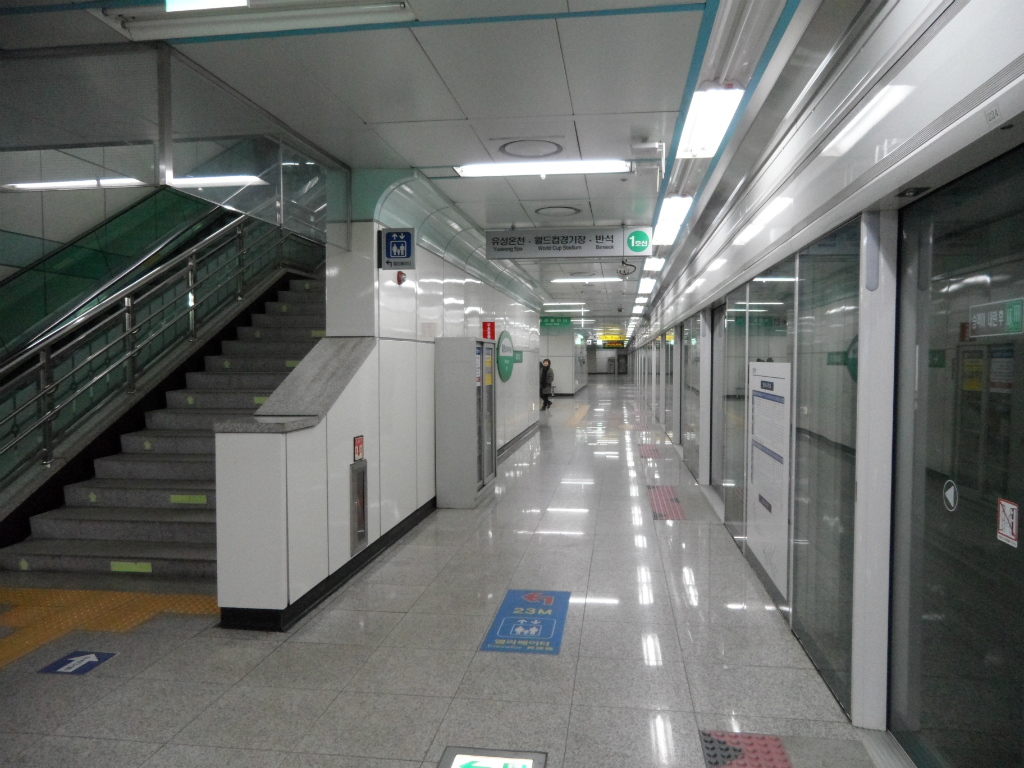

Korean name
- Hangul: 월평역
- Hanja: 月坪驛
- Revised Romanization: Wolpyeong yeok
- McCune–Reischauer: Wŏlp'yŏng yŏk

General information
- Location: Wolpyeong-dong, Seo District, Daejeon; South Korea
- Coordinates: 36°21′30″N 127°21′52″E
- Operator: Daejeon Metropolitan Express Transit Corporation
- Line: Daejeon Metro Line 1
- Platforms: 2
- Tracks: 2

Other information
- Station code: 114

History
- Opened: April 17, 2007; 19 years ago

Services
Preceding station	Daejeon Metro	Following station
Galma towards Panam	Line 1	Gapcheon towards Banseok
Location

Wolpyeong Station (Korean: 월평역; Hanja: 月坪驛) is a station of the Daejeon Metro Line 1 in Wolpyeong-dong, Seo District, Daejeon, South Korea. The 'Wolpyeong' station is 12.26 km (7.62 mi) from Panam. There are many apartment complexes and residential areas around Wolpyeong Station. On the north side of the station is Daejeon Gabcheon Elementary School, and on the south side is Daejeon Wolpyeong Middle School.
