= List of Nippon Professional Baseball no-hitters =

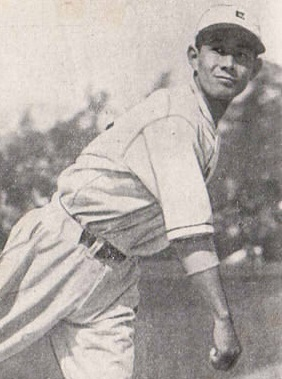
Eiji Sawamura threw the first two no-hitters in Nippon Professional Baseball history.

In baseball, throwing a no-hitter is a pitching accomplishment in which one or more pitchers does not yield a hit in the course of one game. A no-hitter is rare in NPB, occurring 101 times since Eiji Sawamura's first cycle during the single league era in 1936.

Unlike in Major League Baseball (MLB), combined no-hitters are not considered as official no-hitters by Nippon Professional Baseball.

== Nippon Professional Baseball no-hitters ==
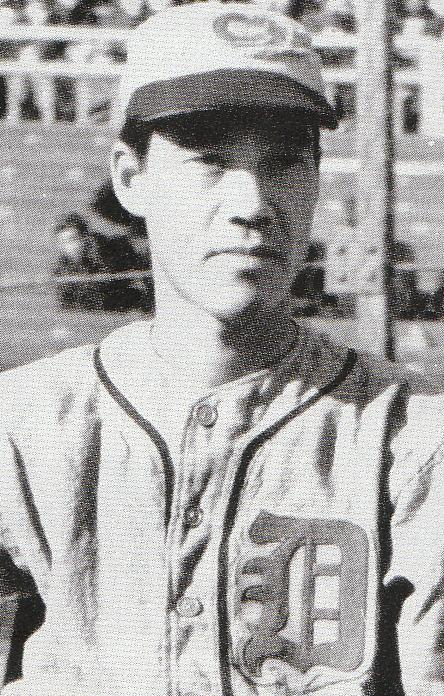
Michio Nishizawa was the first player to throw a no-hitter for the Nagoya Baseball Club.

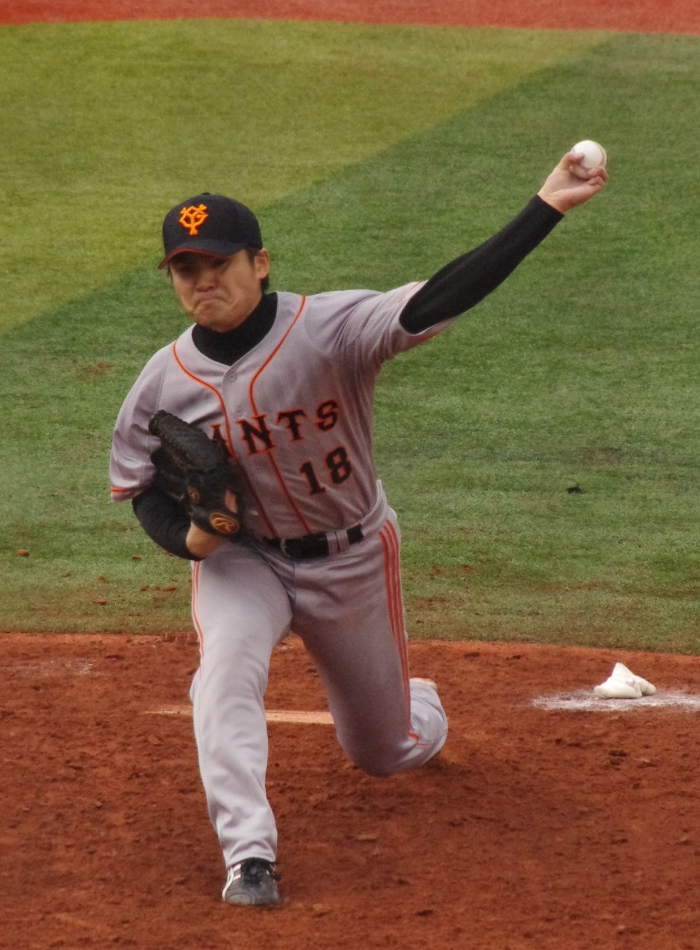
In 2012, Toshiya Sugiuchi became only the second pitcher to throw a no-hitter in an interleague game.

Key to symbols in player table
†	Inducted into the Japanese Baseball Hall of Fame and Museum
*	Denotes a perfect game
(x)	Number of no-hitters recorded to that point (if the player recorded more than one)

=== No-hitters with complete game shutout win ===
Nippon Professional Baseball players who have thrown no-hitters, the date of its occurrence, team, league, and opponent
Player	Date	Team	League	Opponent	Ref
Eiji Sawamura^{†} (1)	September 25, 1936	Tokyo Kyojin	Japanese Baseball League	Osaka Tigers	
Eiji Sawamura^{†} (2)	May 1, 1937	Tokyo Kyojin	Japanese Baseball League	Osaka Tigers	
Victor Starffin^{†}	July 3, 1937	Tokyo Kyojin	Japanese Baseball League	Korakuen Eagles	
Mitsuhiko Ishida (1)	July 16, 1937	Hankyu Baseball Club	Japanese Baseball League	Tokyo Senators	
Hiroshi Nakao^{†} (1)	November 3, 1939	Tokyo Kyojin	Japanese Baseball League	Tokyo Senators	
Tadashi Kameda (1)	March 18, 1940	Eagles	Japanese Baseball League	Lion Baseball Club	
Katsusaburo Asano	April 14, 1940	Hankyu Baseball Club	Japanese Baseball League	Osaka Tigers	
Eiji Sawamura^{†} (3)	July 6, 1940	Tokyo Kyojin	Japanese Baseball League	Nagoya Baseball Club	
Hachiro Miwa	August 3, 1940	Osaka Tigers	Japanese Baseball League	Tokyo Kyojin	
Mitsuhiko Ishida (2)	August 22, 1940	Hankyu Baseball Club	Japanese Baseball League	Lion Baseball Club	
Tadashi Kameda (2)	April 14, 1941	Kurowashi Baseball Club	Japanese Baseball League	Hanshin Baseball Club	
Hiroshi Nakao^{†} (2)	July 16, 1941	Tokyo Kyojin	Japanese Baseball League	Nagoya Baseball Club	
Kotaro Mori	October 27, 1941	Hankyu Baseball Club	Japanese Baseball League	Nagoya Baseball Club	
Michio Nishizawa^{†}	July 18, 1942	Nagoya Baseball Club	Japanese Baseball League	Hankyu Baseball Club	
Yoshio Tenpo	May 2, 1943	Hankyu Baseball Club	Japanese Baseball League	Nankai Baseball Club	
Hideo Fujimoto^{†} (1)	May 22, 1943	Tokyo Kyojin	Japanese Baseball League	Nagoya Baseball Club	
Takehiko Bessho^{†}	May 26, 1943	Nankai Baseball Club	Japanese Baseball League	Yamato Baseball Club	
Shinichi Ishimaru	October 12, 1943	Nagoya Baseball Club	Japanese Baseball League	Yamato Baseball Club	
Shosei Go^{†}	June 16, 1946	Osaka Tigers	Japanese Baseball League	Senators	
Tadayoshi Kajioka	August 24, 1948	Osaka Tigers	Japanese Baseball League	Nankai Hawks	
Juzo Sanada^{†} (1)	September 6, 1948	Taiyo Robins	Japanese Baseball League	Osaka Tigers	
Hideo Fujimoto^{†}* (2)	June 28, 1950	Yomiuri Giants	Central League	Nishi Nippon Pirates	
Masaichi Kaneda^{†} (1)	September 5, 1951	Kokutetsu Swallows	Central League	Osaka Tigers	
Giichi Hayashi	April 27, 1952	Daiei Stars	Pacific League	Hankyu Braves	
Juzo Sanada^{†} (2)	May 7, 1952	Osaka Tigers	Central League	Hiroshima Carp	
Takumi Otomo	July 26, 1952	Yomiuri Giants	Central League	Shochiku Robins	
Noboru Yamashita	August 7, 1954	Kintetsu Pearls	Pacific League	Takahashi Unions	
Shigeru Sugishita^{†}	May 10, 1955	Chunichi Dragons	Central League	Kokutetsu Swallows	
Mamoru Otsu	June 4, 1955	Nishitetsu Lions	Pacific League	Kintetsu Pearls	
Fumio Takechi*	June 19, 1955	Kintetsu Pearls	Pacific League	Daiei Stars	
Teruo Owaki	May 3, 1956	Kokutetsu Swallows	Central League	Chunichi Dragons	
Yoshitomo Miyaji*	September 19, 1956	Kokutetsu Swallows	Central League	Hiroshima Carp	
Masaichi Kaneda^{†}* (2)	August 21, 1957	Kokutetsu Swallows	Central League	Chunichi Dragons	
Hiroomi Oyane	October 12, 1957	Chunichi Dragons	Central League	Osaka Tigers	
Nishimura Sadaaki*	July 19, 1958	Nishitetsu Lions	Pacific League	Toei Flyers	
Gentaro Shimada*	August 11, 1960	Taiyo Whales	Central League	Osaka Tigers	
Yoshimi Moritaki*	June 20, 1961	Kokutetsu Swallows	Central League	Chunichi Dragons	
Yoshio Inoue	May 16, 1964	Nishitetsu Lions	Pacific League	Hankyu Braves	
Toshitake Nakayama	August 18, 1964	Chunichi Dragons	Central League	Yomiuri Giants	
Gene Bacque	June 28, 1965	Hanshin Tigers	Central League	Yomiuri Giants	
Yoshiro Sotokoba^{†} (1)	October 2, 1965	Hiroshima Carp	Central League	Hanshin Tigers	
Kichiro Sasaki*	May 1, 1966	Taiyo Whales	Central League	Hiroshima Carp	
Tsutomu Tanaka*	May 12, 1966	Nishitetsu Lions	Pacific League	Nankai Hawks	
Toshihiko Sei	June 12, 1966	Nishitetsu Lions	Pacific League	Kintetsu Buffaloes	
Tadao Wako	September 17, 1967	Nishitetsu Lions	Pacific League	Hankyu Braves	
Tsuneo Horiuchi^{†}	October 10, 1967	Yomiuri Giants	Central League	Hiroshima Carp	
Kunio Jonouchi	May 16, 1968	Yomiuri Giants	Central League	Taiyo Whales	
Keishi Suzuki^{†} (1)	August 8, 1968	Kintetsu Buffaloes	Pacific League	Toei Flyers	
Yoshiro Sotokoba^{†} (2)	September 14, 1968	Hiroshima Toyo Carp	Central League	Taiyo Whales	
Fumio Narita	August 16, 1969	Lotte Orions	Pacific League	Hankyu Braves	
Hidetake Watanabe	May 18, 1970	Yomiuri Giants	Central League	Hiroshima Toyo Carp	
Hiroshi Kito	June 9, 1970	Taiyo Whales	Central League	Yakult Atoms	
Koichiro Sasaki*	October 6, 1970	Kintetsu Buffaloes	Pacific League	Nankai Hawks	
Kazuhiro Fujimoto	August 19, 1971	Hiroshima Toyo Carp	Central League	Chunichi Dragons	
Yoshimasa Takahashi*	August 21, 1971	Toei Flyers	Pacific League	Nishitetsu Lions	
Keishi Suzuki^{†} (2)	September 9, 1971	Kintetsu Buffaloes	Pacific League	Nishitetsu Lions	
Yoshiro Sotokoba^{†} (3)	April 29, 1972	Hiroshima Toyo Carp	Central League	Yomiuri Giants	
Naoki Takahashi	June 16, 1973	Nittaku Home Flyers	Pacific League	Kintetsu Buffaloes	
Yutaka Enatsu	August 30, 1973	Hanshin Tigers	Central League	Chunichi Dragons	
Soroku Yagisawa*	October 10, 1973	Lotte Orions	Pacific League	Taiheiyo Club Lions	
Toshio Kanbe	April 20, 1975	Kintetsu Buffaloes	Pacific League	Nankai Hawks	
Hajime Kato	April 18, 1976	Yomiuri Giants	Central League	Hiroshima Toyo Carp	
Yoshinori Toda	May 11, 1976	Hankyu Braves	Pacific League	Nankai Hawks	
Yutaro Imai*	August 31, 1978	Hankyu Braves	Pacific League	Lotte Orions	
Kuo Tai-yuan	June 4, 1985	Seibu Lions	Pacific League	Nippon-Ham Fighters	
Yukio Tanaka	June 9, 1985	Nippon-Ham Fighters	Pacific League	Kintetsu Buffaloes	
Shinichi Kondoh	August 9, 1987	Chunichi Dragons	Central League	Yomiuri Giants	
Toshiro Yufune	June 14, 1992	Hanshin Tigers	Central League	Hiroshima Toyo Carp	
Hiromi Makihara*	May 18, 1994	Yomiuri Giants	Central League	Hiroshima Toyo Carp	
Yukihiro Nishizaki	July 5, 1995	Nippon-Ham Fighters	Pacific League	Seibu Lions	
Yoshinori Sato	August 26, 1995	Orix BlueWave	Pacific League	Kintetsu Buffaloes	
Terry Bross	September 9, 1995	Yakult Swallows	Central League	Yomiuri Giants	
Hisanobu Watanabe	June 11, 1996	Seibu Lions	Pacific League	Orix BlueWave	
Shigeki Noguchi	August 11, 1996	Chunichi Dragons	Central League	Yomiuri Giants	
Kazuhisa Ishii	September 2, 1997	Yakult Swallows	Central League	Yokohama BayStars	
Tetsuro Kawajiri	May 26, 1998	Hanshin Tigers	Central League	Chunichi Dragons	
Shinji Sasaoka	May 8, 1999	Hiroshima Toyo Carp	Central League	Chunichi Dragons	
Melvin Bunch	April 7, 2000	Chunichi Dragons	Central League	Yokohama BayStars	
Narciso Elvira	June 20, 2000	Osaka Kintetsu Buffaloes	Pacific League	Seibu Lions	
Kenshin Kawakami	August 1, 2002	Chunichi Dragons	Central League	Yomiuri Giants	
Kei Igawa	October 4, 2004	Hanshin Tigers	Central League	Hiroshima Toyo Carp	
Rick Guttormson	May 25, 2006	Tokyo Yakult Swallows	Interleague	Tohoku Rakuten Golden Eagles	
Masahiro Yamamoto	September 16, 2006	Chunichi Dragons	Central League	Hanshin Tigers	
Kenta Maeda	April 6, 2012	Hiroshima Toyo Carp	Central League	Yokohama DeNA BayStars	
Toshiya Sugiuchi	May 30, 2012	Yomiuri Giants	Interleague	Tohoku Rakuten Golden Eagles	
Yuki Nishi	October 8, 2012	Orix Buffaloes	Pacific League	Fukuoka SoftBank Hawks	
Daisuke Yamai	June 28, 2013	Chunichi Dragons	Central League	Yokohama DeNA BayStars	
Takayuki Kishi	May 2, 2014	Saitama Seibu Lions	Pacific League	Chiba Lotte Marines	
Shun Yamaguchi	July 27, 2018	Yomiuri Giants	Central League	Chunichi Dragons	
Kodai Senga	September 6, 2019	Fukuoka SoftBank Hawks	Pacific League	Chiba Lotte Marines	
Yūdai Ōno	September 16, 2019	Chunichi Dragons	Central League	Hanshin Tigers	
Yasuhiro Ogawa	August 15, 2020	Yakult Swallows	Central League	Yokohama DeNA BayStars	
Rōki Sasaki*	April 10, 2022	Chiba Lotte Marines	Pacific League	Orix Buffaloes	
Nao Higashihama	May 11, 2022	Fukuoka SoftBank Hawks	Pacific League	Saitama Seibu Lions	
Shota Imanaga	June 7, 2022	Yokohama DeNA Baystars	Interleague	Hokkaido Nippon-Ham Fighters	
Yoshinobu Yamamoto (1)	June 18, 2022	Orix Buffaloes	Pacific League	Saitama Seibu Lions	
Cody Ponce	August 27, 2022	Hokkaido Nippon-Ham Fighters	Pacific League	Fukuoka SoftBank Hawks	
Shuta Ishikawa	August 18, 2023	Fukuoka SoftBank Hawks	Pacific League	Saitama Seibu Lions	
Yoshinobu Yamamoto (2)	September 9, 2023	Orix Buffaloes	Pacific League	Chiba Lotte Marines	
Shosei Togo	May 24, 2024	Yomiuri Giants	Central League	Hanshin Tigers	
Daichi Ohsera	June 7, 2024	Hiroshima Toyo Carp	Interleague	Chiba Lotte Marines	
Haruki Hosono	March 31, 2026	Hokkaido Nippon-Ham Fighters	Pacific League	Chiba Lotte Marines	

=== Combined no-hitters ===
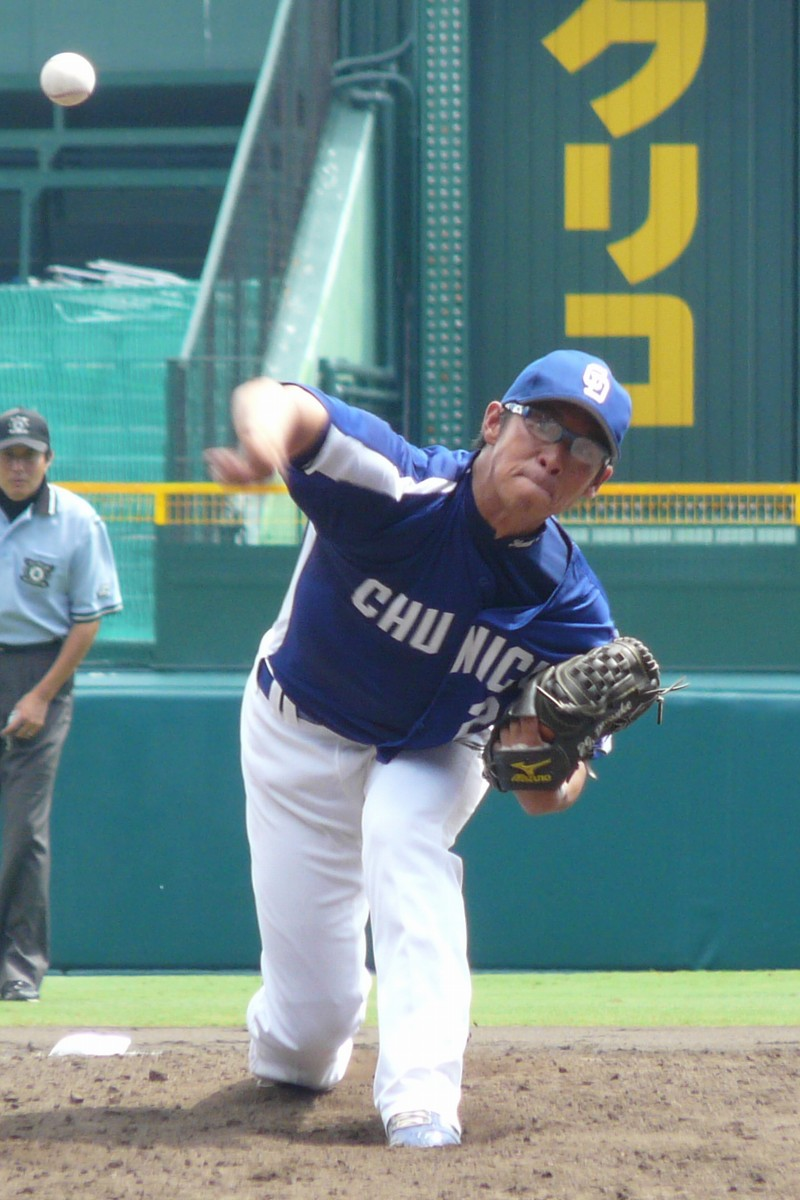
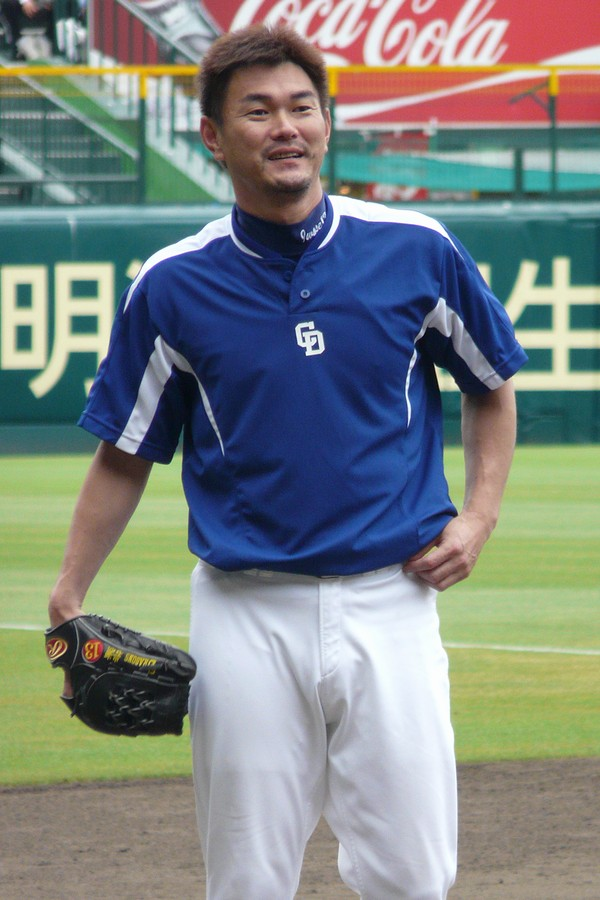
Daisuke Yamai (left) and Hitoki Iwase combined to pitch a perfect game no-hitter in game 5 of the 2007 Japan Series to win the series.

Nippon Professional Baseball players who have combined to throw no-hitters, the date of its occurrence, team, league, and opponent
Players	Date	Team	League	Opponent	Ref
Miyoshi Nakagawa^{†} Shigezo Ishihara	June 22, 1941	Kurowashi Baseball Club	Japanese Baseball League	Nagoya Baseball Club	
Takashi Eda Kotaro Mori	August 2, 1941	Hankyu Baseball Club	Japanese Baseball League	Nagoya Baseball Club	
Tomoya Yagi Hisashi Takeda Michael Nakamura	April 15, 2006	Hokkaido Nippon-Ham Fighters	Pacific League	Fukuoka SoftBank Hawks	
Daisuke Yamai* Hitoki Iwase*	November 1, 2007	Chunichi Dragons	2007 Japan Series	Hokkaido Nippon-Ham Fighters	

=== No-hitters when the opposing team scores ===
While not recognised as no-hitters in NPB, a no-hitter can occur with runs scored by the team that did not accumulate a base hit, by errors, walks, wild pitches, passed balls, stolen bases, sacrifices, sacrifice flies, and defensive fouls (obstruction, catcher's interference, or an errant throw resulting in an automatic base by ground rules). A batter may reach base on a walk, hit by pitch, error, or catcher's interference, and then advance on ground outs, fly outs, stolen bases, or errors to score a run.

Nippon Professional Baseball players who have combined to throw no-hitters, the date of its occurrence, team, league, and opponent
Players	Date	Team	League	Opponent	Ref
Yoshikichi Miyaguchi Shotaro Hirano	May 6, 1939	Nankai Baseball Club	Japanese Baseball League	Hankyu Baseball Club	
Tadashi Kameda	August 3, 1939	Eagles	Japanese Baseball League	Nagoya Kinko Baseball Club	
Minoru Murayama^{†}	May 21, 1959	Osaka Tigers	Central League	Yomiuri Giants	
Noboru Makino Shigemasa Yamamoto	May 13, 1964	Kintetsu Buffaloes	Pacific League	Nankai Hawks	

== See also ==
- List of Nippon Professional Baseball perfect games
- List of Major League Baseball no-hitters
