= Yoshiro Sotokoba =

Japanese baseball player

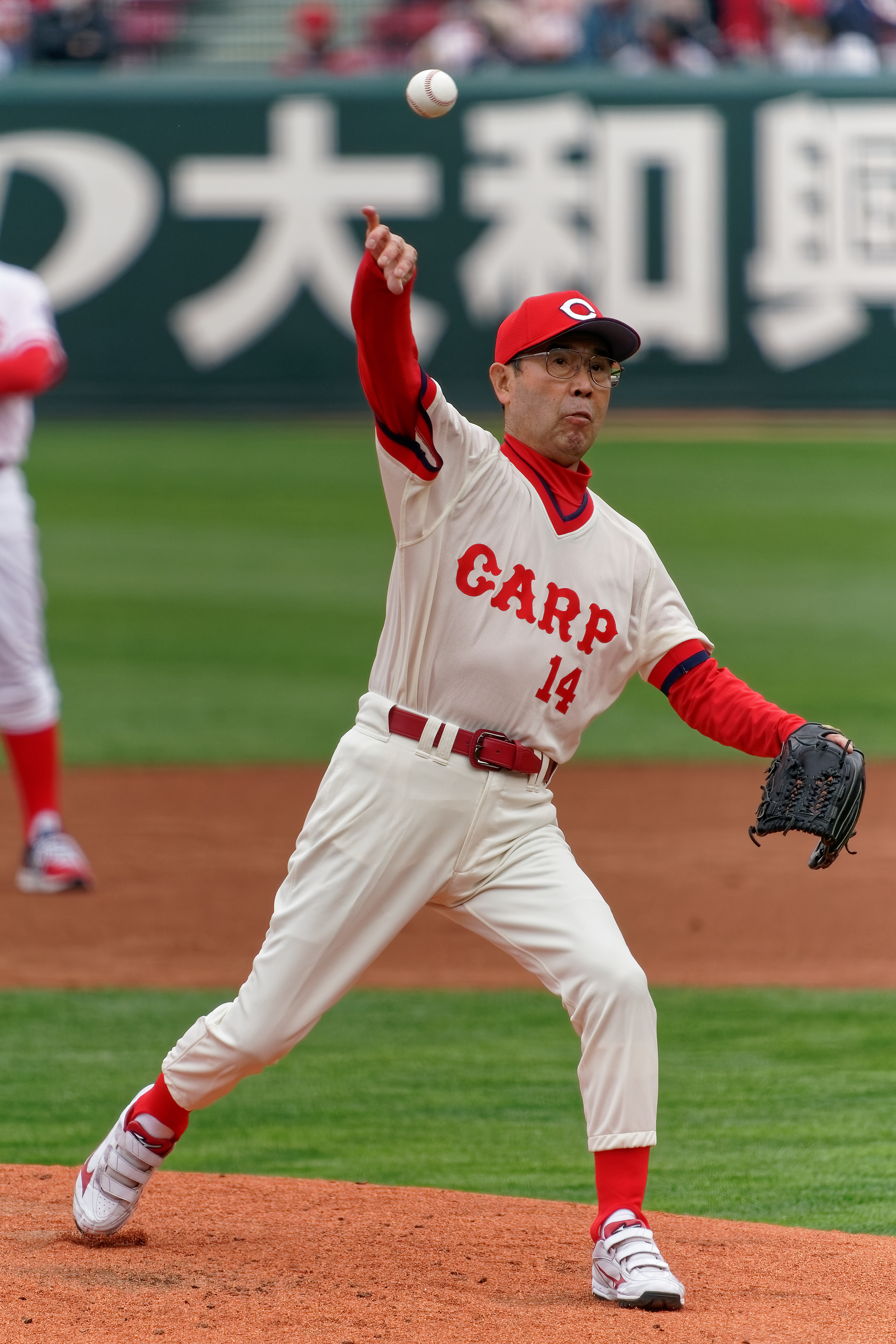
- Pitcher / Coach
- Born: June 1, 1945; Izumi, Kagoshima, Japan
- Batted: Right Threw: Right

NPB debut
- April 21, 1965, for the Hiroshima Carp

Last NPB appearance
- October 14, 1979, for the Hiroshima Toyo Carp

NPB statistics
- Win–loss record: 131–138
- Earned Run Average: 2.88
- Strikeouts: 1,678
- Saves: 3
- Stats at Baseball Reference

Teams
- As player: Hiroshima Carp / Hiroshima Toyo Carp (1965‍–‍1979); As coach: Hiroshima Toyo Carp (1980–1990, 1996–1999); Orix BlueWave (1991–1993)

Career highlights and awards
- 1× Central League Best Nine Award (1975); 1× Eiji Sawamura Award (1975); 1× Central League wins champion (1975); 1× Central League ERA champion (1968); 1× Central League strikeout champion (1975); 6× NPB All-Star (1968–1970, 1972, 1974–1975); Pitched a perfect game (September 14, 1968); 3× pitched a no-hitter

Member of the Japanese

Baseball Hall of Fame
- Induction: 2013
- Last updated on: 24 October 2020

Yoshiro Sotokoba (外木場 義郎, Sotokoba Yoshiro; born June 1, 1945 in Izumi, Kagoshima, Japan) is a Japanese former Nippon Professional Baseball pitcher. Sotokoba threw a perfect game in 1968 and is one of just two pitchers in Japanese baseball history to throw three no-hitters (the other being Eiji Sawamura). He was also inducted into the Japanese Baseball Hall of Fame in 2013.

== Playing Style ==
Sotokoba's primary pitches were an overhand fastball and a sharp-breaking curveball. His curveball was noted for its distinctive characteristics, described as a "power curve" similar to those used in Major League Baseball, which differed from the curveballs thrown by contemporaries such as Tsuneo Horiuchi. According to Yoshihiko Takahashi, the effectiveness of Sotokoba's curveball was demonstrated when it reportedly caused Yomiuri Giants player Shigeru Takada to lose his balance at the plate.

== Jersey Number ==
- 14 (1965–1979)
- 73 (1980–1993)
- 80 (1996–1999)
