= Hiroki Minei =

Japanese baseball player (born 1991)

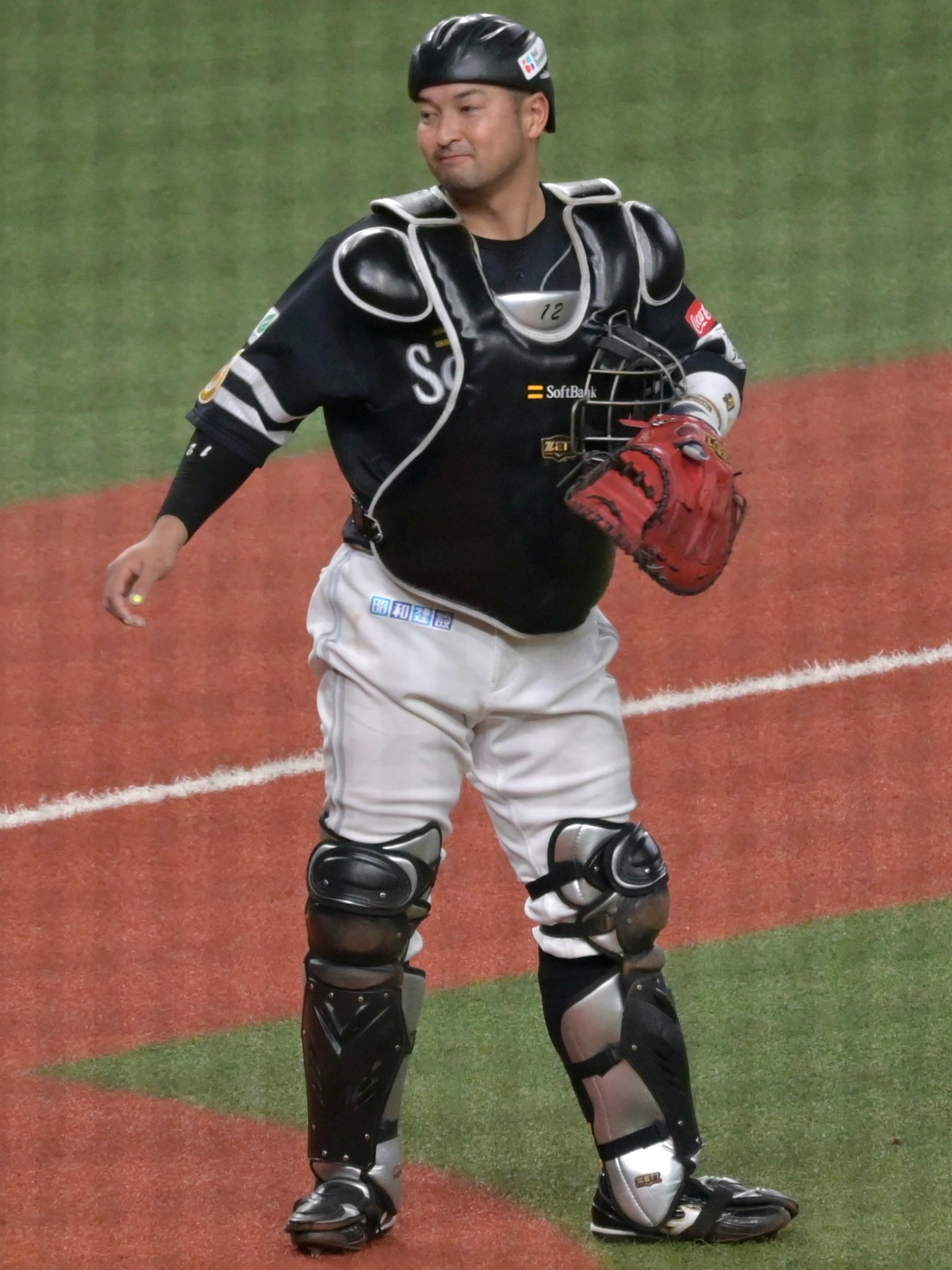
- Minei with the Fukuoka SoftBank Hawks.

Fukuoka SoftBank Hawks – No. 12
- Catcher
- Born: June 4, 1991 (age 35); Nanjō, Okinawa, Japan
- Bats: Right Throws: Right

NPB debut
- April 15, 2014, for the Yokohama DeNA BayStars

Career statistics (through 2025 season)
- Batting average: .220
- Home runs: 27
- Run batted in: 154
- Hits: 267
- Stats at Baseball Reference

Teams
- Yokohama DeNA BayStars (2014–2022); Fukuoka SoftBank Hawks (2023–present)

Career highlights and awards
- Japan Series champion (2025)

Hiroki Minei (嶺井 博希, Minei Hiroki; born June 4, 1991) is a Japanese professional baseball catcher for the Fukuoka SoftBank Hawks of Nippon Professional Baseball (NPB). He has previously played in NPB for the Yokohama DeNA BayStars.

== Early baseball career ==
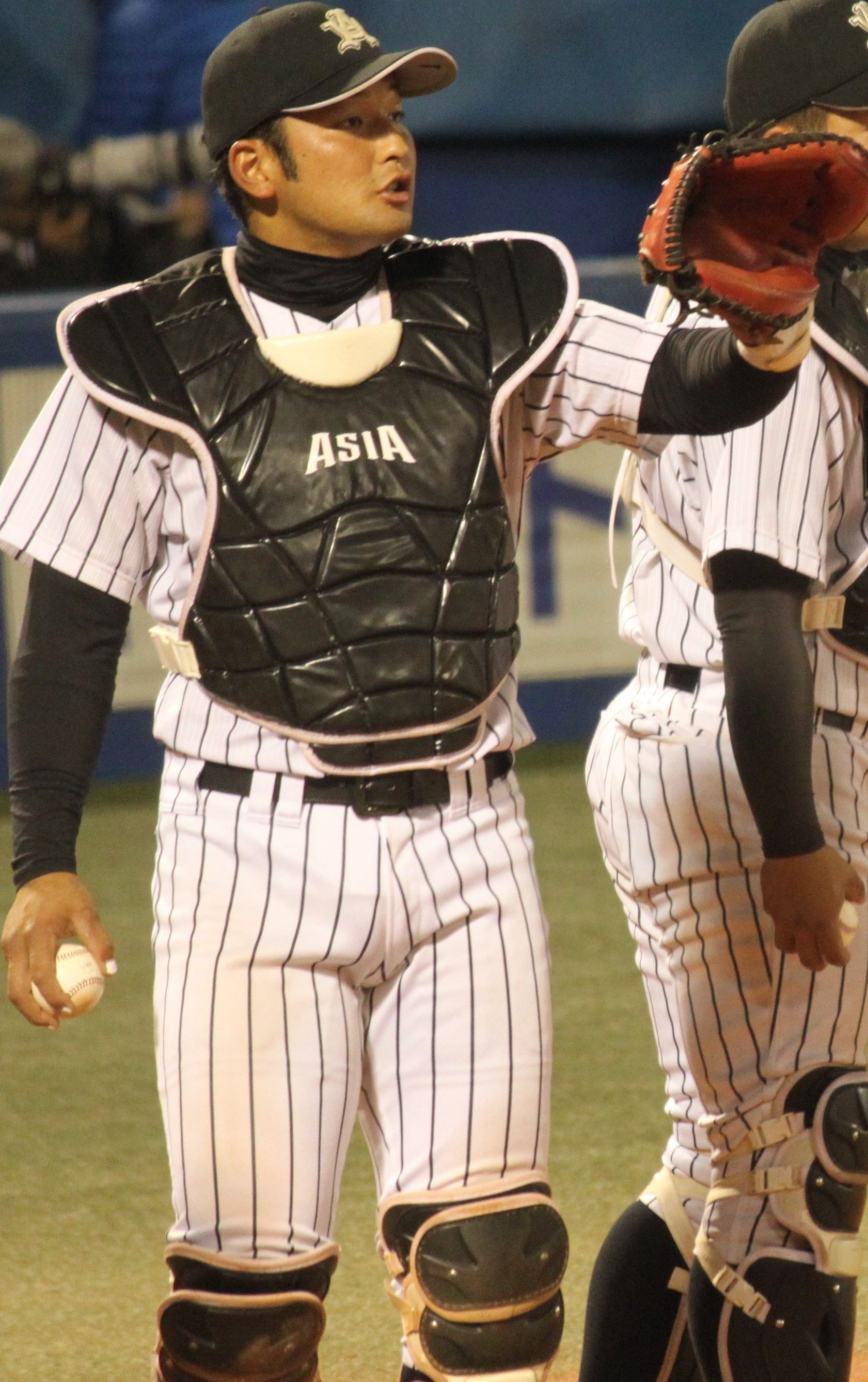
Minei with the Asia University Baseball Club in 2013.

Minei went on to Okinawa Shogaku High School, where he played catcher and battery with Nao Higashihama to win the 80th Japanese High School Baseball Invitational Tournament.

He went on to Asia University, where he teamed up with senior Higashihama to win the Tohto University Baseball League in the fall of his sophomore year, and the Meiji Jingu Baseball Tournament championship in the fall of his senior year. He was also selected to the Japan national baseball team as a senior and played in the 39th USA vs. Japan Collegiate All-Star Series.

He was in a battery team with his classmate Aren Kuri and Yasuaki Yamasaki, one year his junior, in addition to Higashihama during his college days.

== Professional career ==
=== Yokohama DeNA BayStars ===
On October 24, 2013, Minei was drafted by the Yokohama DeNA BayStars in the 2013 Nippon Professional Baseball draft.

==== 2014–2020 season ====
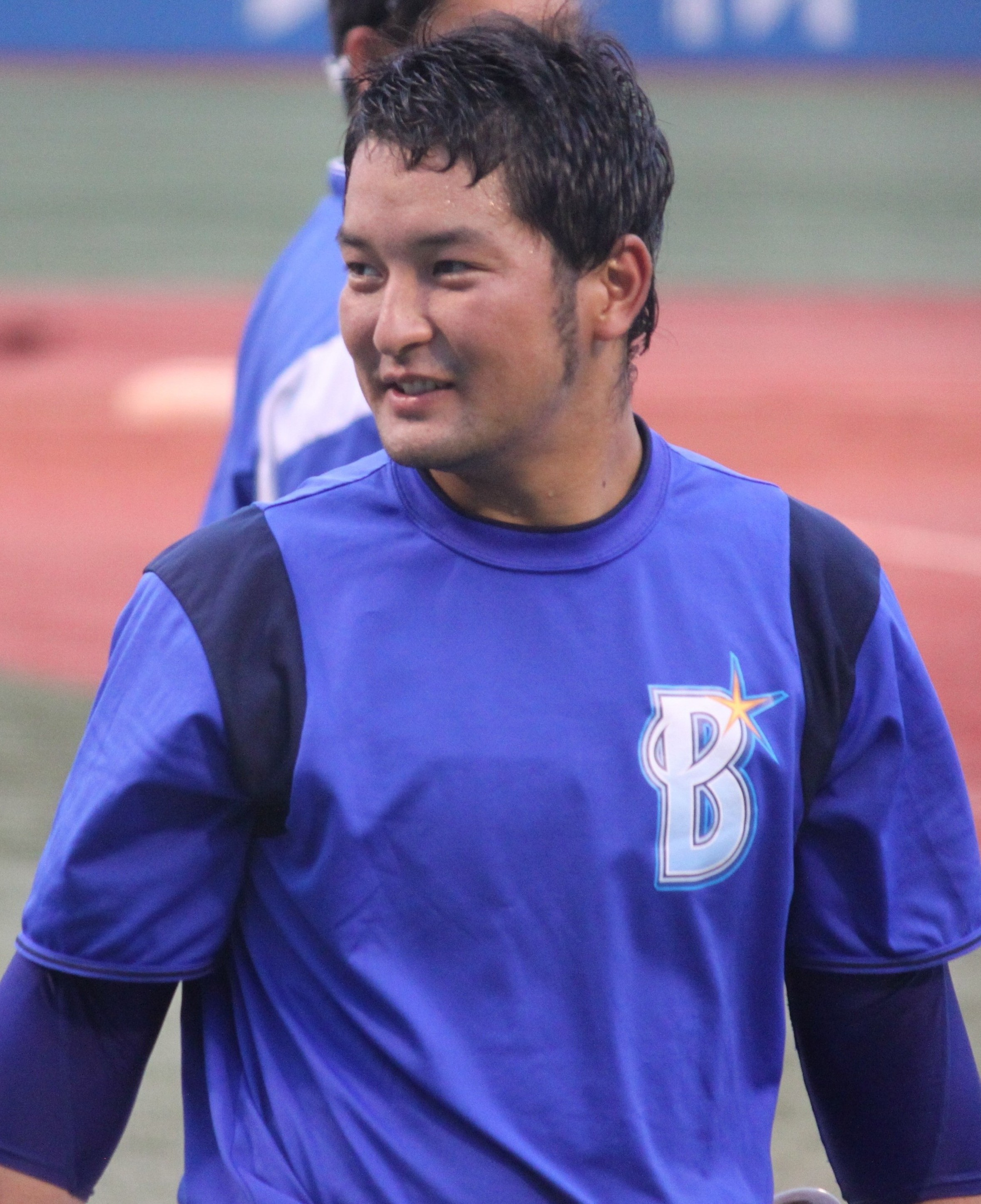
Minei with the Yokohama DeNA BayStars in 2014.

On April 15, 2014, Minei made his first league debut in the Central League against the Chunichi Dragons. On June 21, in an interleague play against the Saitama Seibu Lions, he recorded his first hit and RBI scored on a triple in the bottom of the 10th inning of extra innings, which became a walk-off hit. In 2014 season, he played in 10 games his rookie year.

On April 25, 2015, Minei recorded his first home run against the Chunichi Dragons. In 2015 season, he played in a career-high 74 games and finished the regular season with a .237 batting average, five home runs, and 26 RBI.

In 2016 season, he played only 11 games, he did hit the winning run in Game 2 of the 2016 Central League Climax Series against the Yomiuri Giants on October 10, helping his team advance to the final stage.

In 2017 season, Minei finished the regular season with a .248 batting average, three home runs, and 12 RBI in 52 games. And he had a two-RBI hit in Game 3 of the first stage of the 2017 Central League Climax Series against the Hanshin Tigers on October 17, helping his team qualify for the final stage. In the 2017 Japan Series against the Fukuoka SoftBank Hawks he played in Games 1, 3, 5 and 6.

In 2018 season, Minei finished the regular season with a personal best 91 games played, 37 hits, a .177 batting average, 5 home runs, and 25 RBI. On November 26, he renewed his contract with an estimated salary of 27 million yen.

On August 24, 2019, he saved his team by hitting a two-run homer in a game in which a loss versus the Yomiuri Giants would have eliminated the team's own championship. In 2019 season, he was sluggish, batting .211 with two home runs and 12 RBIs in 64 games played.

In 2020 season, Minei was struck from the first team registration at the end of the season and played in only 41 games, playing for the second team, but he batted .327 and drove in eight RBI. On December 4 he renewed his contract at an estimated annual salary of 30 million yen.

==== 2021–2022 season ====
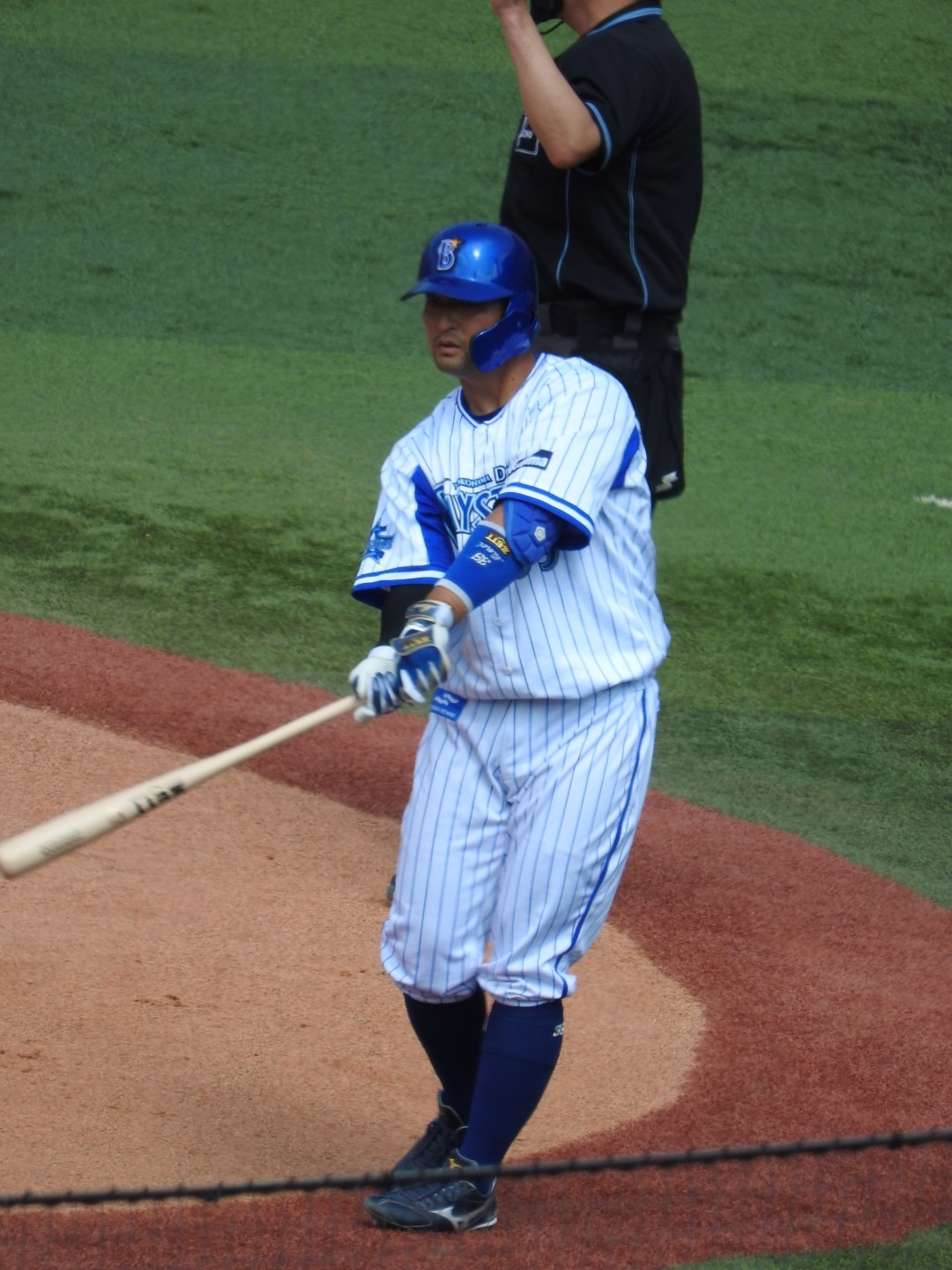
Minei with the Yokohama DeNA BayStars in 2022.

In 2021 season, Minei finished the season with 36 appearances, partly due to right elbow cleaning surgery in September, and his contract was renewed on November 18 at an estimated salary of 27 million yen.

On May 5, 2022, he hit a home run for the first time in three seasons against the Chunichi Dragons. In a June 7 interleague game against the Hokkaido Nippon-Ham Fighters, he assisted Shota Imanaga as catcher in the team's first no-hitter in 52 years. In 2022 season, he played in a career-high 93 games and finished the regular season with a .203 batting average, five home runs, and 30 RBI.

Minei has decided to exercise his domestic free agent rights acquired for the 2022 season. The Fukuoka Softbank Hawks offered him a four-year contract with an estimated total value of 300 million yen, and he decided to move to the Hawks.

=== Fukuoka SoftBank Hawks ===
On November 21, 2022, the Fukuoka SoftBank Hawks announced that Minei had joined the team. His uniform number became 12.

==== 2023 season–present ====
In the game against the Chiba Lotte Marines on May 6, 2023, Minei teamed up with Nao Higashihama for the first time since their college days, and won the game. In 2023 season, he played 44 games, and finished the season with a .206 batting average, a two home runs and six RBI.
