= Kenshin Kawakami =

Japanese baseball player (born 1975)

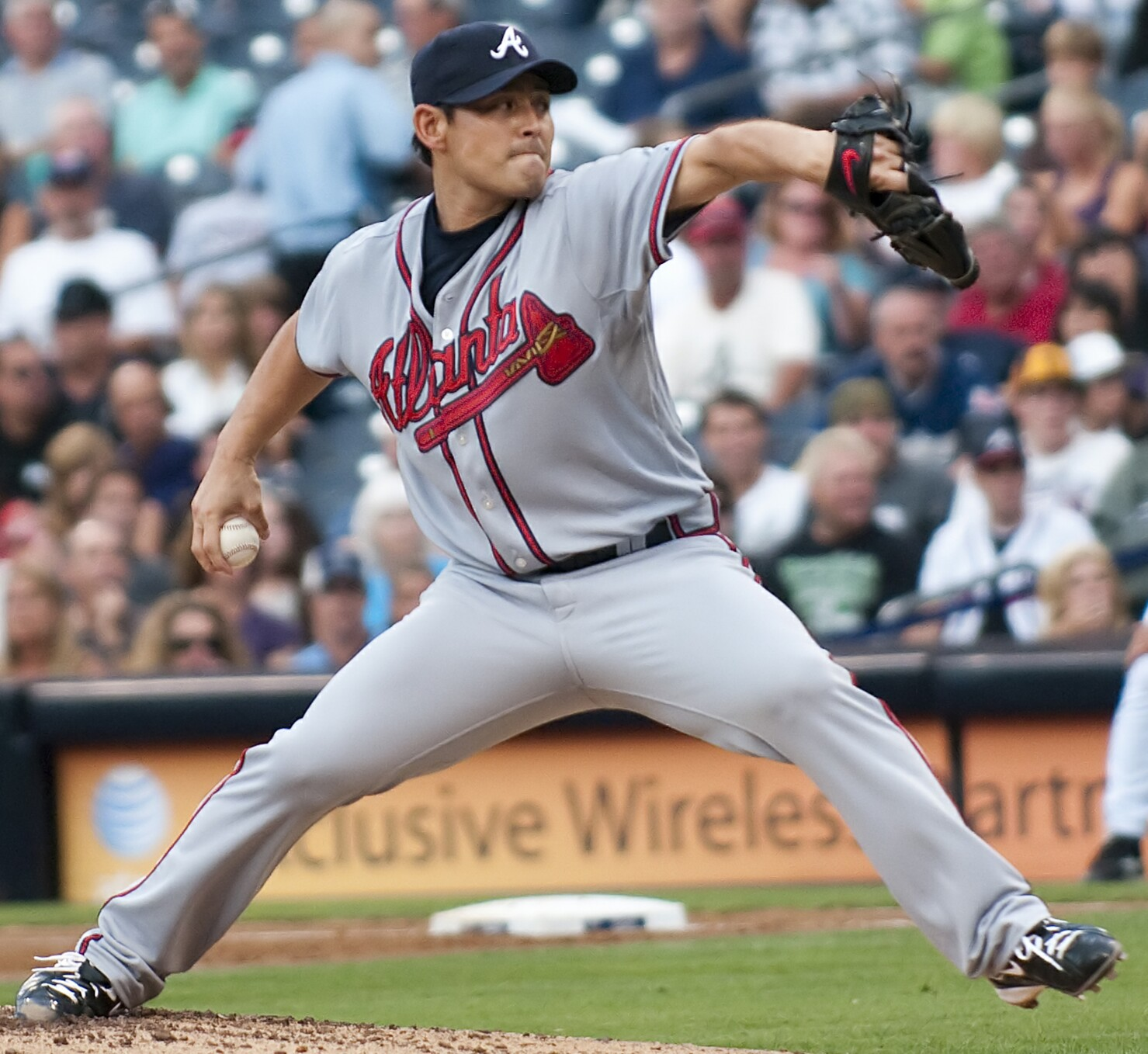
- Kawakami with the Atlanta Braves in 2009
- Pitcher
- Born: June 22, 1975 (age 51); Tokushima, Tokushima, Japan
- Batted: Right Threw: Right

Professional debut
- NPB: April 9, 1998, for the Chunichi Dragons
- MLB: April 11, 2009, for the Atlanta Braves

Last appearance
- MLB: September 9, 2010, for the Atlanta Braves
- NPB: June 13, 2014, for the Chunichi Dragons

NPB statistics
- Win–loss record: 117–76
- Earned run average: 3.24
- Strikeouts: 1,381

MLB statistics
- Win–loss record: 8–22
- Earned run average: 4.32
- Strikeouts: 164
- Stats at Baseball Reference

Teams
- Chunichi Dragons (1998–2008); Atlanta Braves (2009–2010); Chunichi Dragons (2012–2014)

Career highlights and awards
- Japan Series champion (2007); Central League MVP (2004); Eiji Sawamura Award (2004); CL Rookie of the Year (1998); 2x Central League Best Nine (2004, 2006); 3x NPB Golden Glove Award (2004, 2006, 2007); 2x Central League wins leader (2004, 2006); 1x Central League strikeout leader (2006); Pitched a no-hitter (1 August 2002); 2× Most Valuable Battery Award (2004, 2006 - with Motonobu Tanishige); 6x NPB All-Star selection (1998, 2002, 2004-2006, 2008)

Kenshin Kawakami (川上 憲伸) (born June 22, 1975) is a Japanese former professional baseball pitcher. He played in Nippon Professional Baseball (NPB) for the Chunichi Dragons and in Major League Baseball (MLB) for the Atlanta Braves.

== Japanese career ==
He originally pitched for the Chunichi Dragons of the Central League. Kawakami was the Rookie of the Year in 1998 as he went 14–6 with a 2.57 ERA. He helped the Dragons to the Central League Title in 1999, but would lose in the Japan Series in 5 games to the Fukuoka Daiei Hawks. He has pitched a no-hitter in his professional career. In 2004, Kawakami went 17–7 and led Chunichi to the Central League Title, though they fell to the Seibu Lions in 7 games in the Japan Series. That year, Kawakami was named Central League MVP and received the Eiji Sawamura Award as Japan's best pitcher. Kawakami again won 17 games in 2006 and led the Dragons to the Central League title again, winning Game 1 of the Japan Series against the Hokkaido Nippon Ham Fighters.

In 2007, Kawakami helped the Dragons end a streak of 53 years without a championship as they beat the Nippon Ham Fighters in 5 games.

== Major League Baseball career ==
On January 13, 2009, Kawakami signed a three-year deal with the Atlanta Braves.

Kenshin Kawakami threw his first game as an Atlanta Brave on February 26 in a Spring training game against the Pirates. Kawakami pitched two innings allowing one hit and striking out one batter.

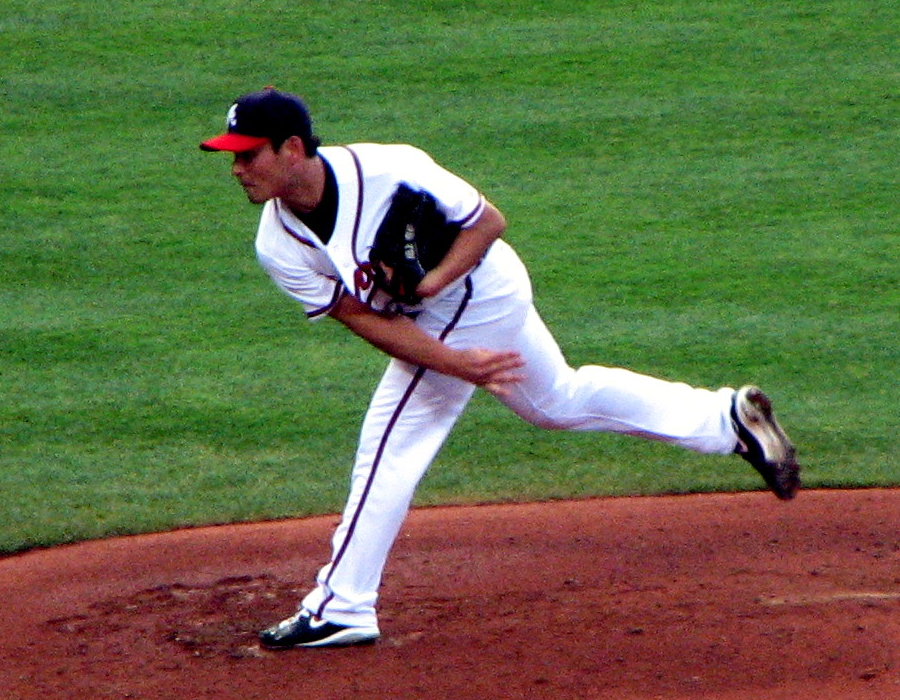
Kawakami pitching for the Atlanta Braves in 2009

Kawakami pitched his first Major League game on April 11, 2009 against the Washington Nationals. He picked up his first Major League win, giving up 3 earned runs, and striking out 8 in 6 innings. On May 22 and against countryman Daisuke Matsuzaka at Fenway Park, he limited the Boston Red Sox to two hits and two earned runs in six innings and helped the Braves begin a 13-game stretch with an 8–2 win over the Red Sox.

Kawakami went 1–10 in 2010 and recorded nine straight losses before picking up his first win on June 26 against the Detroit Tigers at Turner Field. He pitched seven innings with six strikeouts in a 4–3 win for the Braves. After being sent to the bullpen, Kawakami only pitched once in 40 games, where he performed poorly, allowing 2 runs in one inning. On November 12, following the season, the Braves outrighted Kawakami to their Double-A affiliate, the Mississippi Braves.

During the 2010 season, a group of fans would dress as "Kenshin's Geishas" to support Kawakami during homestands.

== Return to Japan ==
After spending the entirety of the 2011 season pitching at the AA level for the Mississippi Braves, Kawakami agreed to a contract with his previous team, the Chunichi Dragons of Japan's Central League.

Kawakami struggled with injury upon his return to the Dragons, making only a combined 12 starts during the 2012 and 2013 seasons. He went 3–1 with a 2.83 in seven starts during 2012 and 1–1 with a 3.21 ERA in five starts during 2013. Due to shoulder pain, he did not make his first start in 2013 until 22 August.

On 22 November 2013, the Chunichi Dragons announced that they had signed Kawakami to a 1-year extension. However he only managed six starts in 2014 and was not resigned for the 2015 season, he announced his retirement in October 2015.

== Pitching style ==
Kawakami throws a fastball around 90 mph (tops out at 94), shuuto (sinker), slow curveball, splitter, and a good cutter.

== Outside baseball ==
In response to the 2011 earthquake and tsunami in Japan, Kawakami donated $50,000 to relief efforts.

Awards
Preceded by Kei Igawa; Hiroki Kuroda	Central League Best Nine Award for Pitcher; 2004; 2006	Succeeded by Hiroki Kuroda; Hisanori Takahashi
