= The Victory Season =

2013 book by Robert Weintraub

The Victory Season: The End of World War II and the Birth of Baseball's Golden Age
- Author: Robert Weintraub
- Language: English
- Genre: Non-fiction
- Publisher: Little, Brown and Company
- Publication date: 2013
- Publication place: United States
- Media type: Print (Hardcover)
- Pages: 460
- ISBN: 978-0-316-20591-7
- Dewey Decimal: 796.3570973-dc23

The Victory Season: The End of World War II and the Birth of Baseball's Golden Age is a 2013 book written by Robert Weintraub whose previous work includes the New York Times best-seller The House That Ruth Built.

== Summary ==
The Victory Season focuses on the 1946 Major League Baseball season, which was the first full season that followed the end of World War II. Weintraub's book focuses on four major areas:

- Transition of baseball players from military service to professional baseball. Professional ball players were subject to the war time draft and many of them served in the different military services. Of those that served, a number of them, such as Joe DiMaggio never saw action and instead played on service baseball teams that entertained the troops. Other such as Bob Feller and Jack Lohrke saw extensive action throughout the war. Feller received numerous campaign ribbons and battle stars for his service in the Navy; Lohrke gained fame as a man who cheated death so many times, both during and after the war, he was given the nickname "Lucky" Lohrke.
- Racial integration of baseball. In 1946, baseball was still a segregated sport. Branch Rickey, the general manager of the Brooklyn Dodgers broke the racial barrier by signing Jackie Robinson as the league's first black ball player in 1946. Although he did not reach the major league level until the following season, Weintraub examines Robinson's challenges and accomplishments as a minor league player for the Montreal Royals, a Brooklyn farm team, during the 1946 season.
- Defections to the Mexican League. Upset over the continued imposition of baseball's reserve clause, combined with the owner's failure to provide meaningful pay raises, several well known baseball players accepted a Mexican millionaire's offer of significantly higher salaries to play south of the border. However, when St. Louis Cardinals star Stan Musial wavered, claiming that he couldn't break his contract with the Cardinals, the effort slowed and eventually ended when the economics of the rival league could not support the higher salaries.
- The 1946 World Series between the Boston Red Sox and the St. Louis Cardinals. The 1946 Red Sox were a baseball powerhouse featuring a heavy hitting lineup that included Ted Williams, Dom DiMaggio, Johnny Pesky, and Bobby Doerr. The pitching staff was anchored by Boo Ferriss. The Cardinals also had an impressive lineup that featured Stan Musial, Red Schoendienst, Enos Slaughter, Marty Marion, and Whitey Kurowski. Although heavily favored to win the Series, the Red Sox lost in seven games. Many people placed the blame on Pesky's failure to make a key play, allowing Slaughter to score from first base on a play that would have normally advanced him no further than third base. Pesky is quoted in the book as accepting blame for the loss.

Weintraub covers a number of other areas in the book, to include an attempt to unionize players, life in postwar Germany, shortages and rationing in the United States, and numerous anecdotes about some of baseball's most famous personalities to include Leo Durocher, Larry MacPhail, Tom Yawkey, Pete Reiser, and others. Although not as well known to baseball fans, Weintraub also tells the story of Eiji Sawamura, the Japanese pitching star who rebuffed offers to join major league baseball and who subsequently died in World War II fighting for Japan.

== Reviews ==
Critics provided favorable reviews of the book and complimented Weintraub's "meticulous research" and ability to weave stories together in a "conversational style" that added to the books readability.

"We see a lot of baseball books each spring, but few will be more supremely entertaining than The Victory Season: The End of World War II and the Birth of Baseball's Golden Age, Robert Weintraub's chronicle of the '46 season."

"In The Victory Season: The End of World War II and the Birth of Baseball's Golden Age, Robert Weintraub recounts the game's joyous reacclimatization, duly honoring the fine record of service of many players, shedding light on veteran returns and underscoring significant contemporary events.

"Weintraub is a big-league storyteller, and The Victory Season confirms that baseball is in his wheelhouse. Step up to this plate. You'll watch the 2013 baseball season with a different perspective.
