= Nao Higashihama =

Japanese baseball player (born 1990)

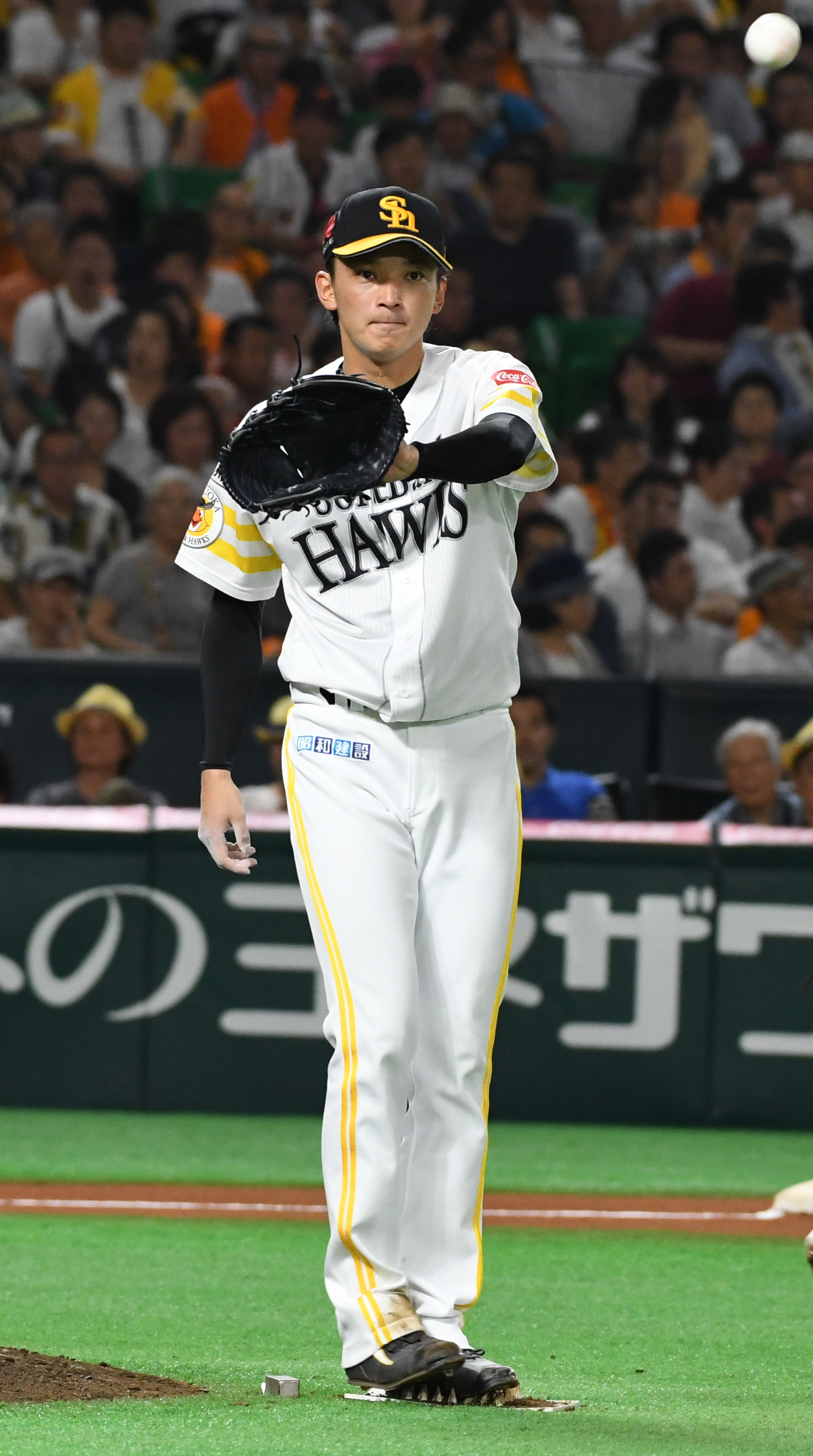
- Higashihama with the Fukuoka SoftBank Hawks

Fukuoka SoftBank Hawks – No. 16
- Pitcher
- Born: June 20, 1990 (age 36); Yonashiro, Okinawa, Japan
- Bats: Right Throws: Right

NPB debut
- April 11, 2013, for the Fukuoka SoftBank Hawks

NPB statistics (through 2024 season)
- Win–loss record: 72-44
- ERA: 3.33
- Strikeouts: 795
- Stats at Baseball Reference

Teams
- Fukuoka SoftBank Hawks (2013–present)

Career highlights and awards
- Pacific League wins leader (2017); 5× Japan Series champion (2014, 2015, 2017, 2018, 2025); Pitched a no-hitter on May 11, 2022; NPB All-Star (2022)
Medals
Men's baseball
Representing Japan
2009 Asian Baseball Championship
Gold medal – first place	2009 Japan	Team

Nao Higashihama (東浜 巨, Higashihama Nao; born June 20, 1990) is a Japanese professional baseball pitcher for the Fukuoka SoftBank Hawks of Nippon Professional Baseball (NPB).

== Early baseball career ==
Higashihama pitched in the 3rd grade spring 80th Japanese High School Baseball Invitational Tournament as Okinawa Shogaku High School ace pitcher and won.

He was selected as the Japan national baseball team in the 37th and 38th USA VS Japan Collegiate All-Star Series and 2009 Asian Baseball Championship while attending Asia University.

== Professional career ==
On October 25, 2012, Higashihama was drafted by the Fukuoka Softbank Hawks first overall pick in the 2012 Nippon Professional Baseball draft.

=== 2013–2015 season ===
On April 11, 2013, Higashihama pitched his debut game as a starting pitcher against the Orix Buffaloes. On April 23, he won the game for the first time. In 2013 season, he finished the regular season with a 5 Games pitched, a 3–1 Win–loss record, a 2.83 ERA, a 25 strikeouts in 28 2/3 innings.

In 2014 season, Higashihama finished the regular season with a 7 Games pitched, a 2–2 Win–loss record, a 3.82 ERA, a 30 strikeouts in 35 1/3 innings. And he pitched in the 2014 Japan Series and recorded a hold.

In 2015 season, Higashihama finished the regular season with a 6 Games pitched, a 1–2 Win–loss record, a 4.82 ERA, a 23 strikeouts in 28 innings. And he was selected as the Japan Series roster in the 2015 Japan Series.

=== 2016–2020 season ===
In 2016 season, Higashihama finished the regular season with a 23 Games pitched, a 9–6 Win–loss record, a 3.00 ERA, a 100 strikeouts in 135 innings.

In 2017 season, Higashihama finished the regular season with a 16–5 Win–loss record, a 2.64 ERA, a 139 strikeouts in 160 innings and he won the 2017 Pacific League the most wins Champion. And he pitched as a starting pitcher in the 2017 Japan Series.

On May 26, 2018, Higashihama was diagnosed with right shoulder dysfunction and spent two months in rehabilitation. On August 7, he returned in the game against the Chiba Lotte Marines. In 2018 season, he finished the regular season with a 17 Games pitched, a 7–5 Win–loss record, a 3.32 ERA, an 83 strikeouts in 103 innings. On October 10, he was selected Japan national baseball team at the 2018 MLB Japan All-Star Series. On October 31, Higashihama pitched as a starting pitcher and won the game for the first time in the Japan Series .

On June 5, 2019, Higashihama had right elbow surgery and spent the rest of the season on rehabilitation. In 2019 season, he finished the regular season with a 7 Games pitched, a 2–2 Win–loss record, a 6.37 ERA, a 26 strikeouts in 35 1/3 innings.

In the opening game of the 2020 season against the Chiba Lotte Marines on June 19, 2020, Higashihama pitched as his first opening game starter. In 2020 season, he finished the regular season with a 19 Games pitched, a 9–2 Win–loss record, a 2.34 ERA, a 102 strikeouts in 119 innings. However, he was out of the 2020 Japan Series roaster due to poor condition on his right shoulder.

=== 2021 season–present ===
In 2021 season, Higasihama returned to the team on May 26 after a delayed start with a sore right shoulder. he recorded with a 14 Games pitched, a 4–4 Win–loss record, a 3.70 ERA, and a 61 strikeouts in 75.1 innings.

On May 11, 2022, Higashihama threw the third no-hitter in Hawks history and the first since 2019 against the Saitama Seibu Lions, and only giving up 2 walks. On July 27, he participated the All-Star Game for the first time in My Navi All-Star Game 2022. In 2022 season, he finished the regular season with a 23 Games pitched, a 10–6 Win–loss record, a 3.11 ERA, and a 94 strikeouts in 136 innings.

In the game against the Chiba Lotte Marines on May 6, 2023, Higashihama teamed up with Hiroki Minei, who joined the Hawks this year, for the first time since their college days, and won the game. In 2023 season, he finished the regular season with a 17 Games pitched, a 6-7 Win–loss record, a 4.52 ERA, and a 73 strikeouts in 99.2 innings.
