= Daisuke Yamai =

Japanese baseball player (born 1978)

Daisuke Yamai 山井 大介
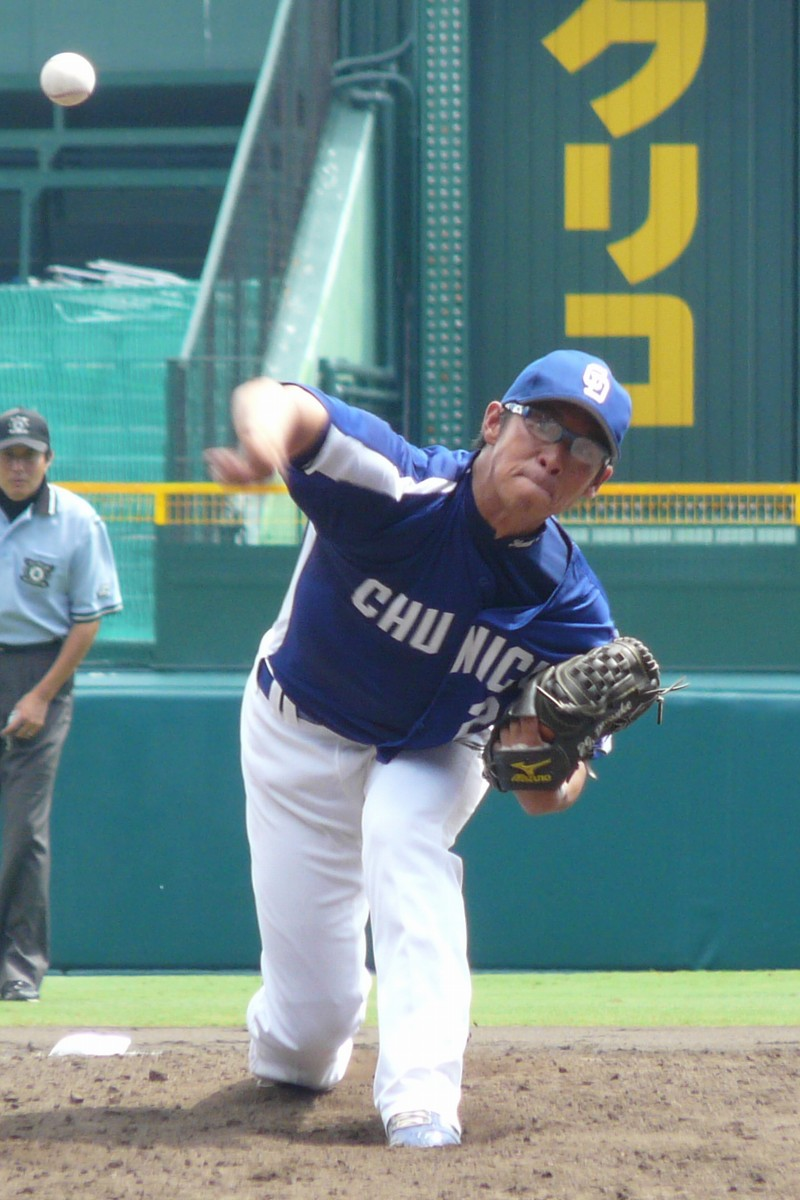
- Yamai with the Chunichi Dragons

Chunichi Dragons – No. 83
- Pitcher/Coach
- Batted: Right Threw: Right

NPB debut
- April 27, 2002, for the Chunichi Dragons

Last NPB appearance
- October 13, 2021, for the Chunichi Dragons

Career statistics
- Win–loss: 62-70
- ERA: 3.75
- Strikeouts: 866
- Saves: 20
- Holds: 32
- Stats at Baseball Reference

Teams
- As player: Chunichi Dragons (2002–2021); As coach: Chunichi Dragons (2022-Present)

Career highlights and awards
- Combined perfect game with Hitoki Iwase (2007); No-hitter against the Yokohama DeNA BayStars (2013); Most wins in Central League (2014); Highest win percentage in Central League (2014); 1× NPB All-Star (2014)

Daisuke Yamai (山井 大介, Yamai Daisuke; born May 10, 1978) is a former Japanese professional baseball pitcher who played his entire career with the Chunichi Dragons. He is most noted for his combined perfect game with Hitoki Iwase in the 2007 Japan Series to clinch the title for the Dragons for the first time since 1954.

== Career ==
In the 2007 Nippon Series, he threw eight innings of a combined perfect game with Hitoki Iwase to decide the series against the Hokkaido Nippon-Ham Fighters.

On 29 June 2013, Yamai threw the 88th no-hitter in NPB history against the Yokohama DeNA BayStars in a 9-0 win.
