= Melvin Bunch =

American baseball player (born 1971)

- Pitcher
- Born: November 4, 1971 (age 54); Texarkana, Texas, U.S.
- Batted: Right Threw: Right

Professional debut
- MLB: May 6, 1995, for the Kansas City Royals
- NPB: April 1, 2000, for the Chunichi Dragons

Last appearance
- MLB: June 25, 1999, for the Seattle Mariners
- NPB: July 30, 2002, for the Chunichi Dragons

MLB statistics
- Win–loss record: 1–3
- Earned run average: 6.84
- Strikeouts: 23

NPB statistics
- Win–loss record: 31–23
- Earned run average: 3.19
- Strikeouts: 416
- Stats at Baseball Reference

Teams
- Kansas City Royals (1995); Seattle Mariners (1999); Chunichi Dragons (2000–2002)

Career highlights and awards
- Pitched a no-hitter on April 7, 2000

Melvin Lynn Bunch, Jr. (born November 4, 1971) is a former Major League Baseball pitcher. He played parts of two seasons in the majors: 1995 with the Kansas City Royals and 1999 for the Seattle Mariners. He also played three seasons in Japan for the Chunichi Dragons from 2000 through 2002.

Bunch graduated from Liberty-Elyau High School in Texarkana, Texas, in 1990, then from Texarkana Community College in 1992. The Royals drafted him in the 15th round of the 1992 MLB draft. He was a Midwest League All-Star in 1993. He missed almost three months in 1994 with a shoulder injury.

Bunch made the Royals' Opening Day roster in 1995, making his MLB debut on May 6. He earned his only MLB win after pitching six scoreless innings against the Chicago White Sox in August. He had four separate stints in the majors, going 1–3 with a 5.63 earned run average (ERA) in 13 games, five of them starts.

Bunch then returned to the minors. He led the American Association in runs, hits, and home runs allowed in 1996. He then joined the Montreal Expos farm system before signing with the Mariners ahead of the 1999 season. He led the Pacific Coast League with a 3.10 ERA in 1999. He pitched in five games for the Mariners, posting an 11.70 ERA in his final MLB season.

In his second start with Chunichi in April 2000, Bunch became the fourth American to throw a no-hitter in Nippon Professional Baseball. Bunch left the Dragons and returned to the United States in August 2002 to seek treatment for anxiety attacks. He did not play in professional baseball again.
