= Eiji Sawamura =

Japanese baseball player

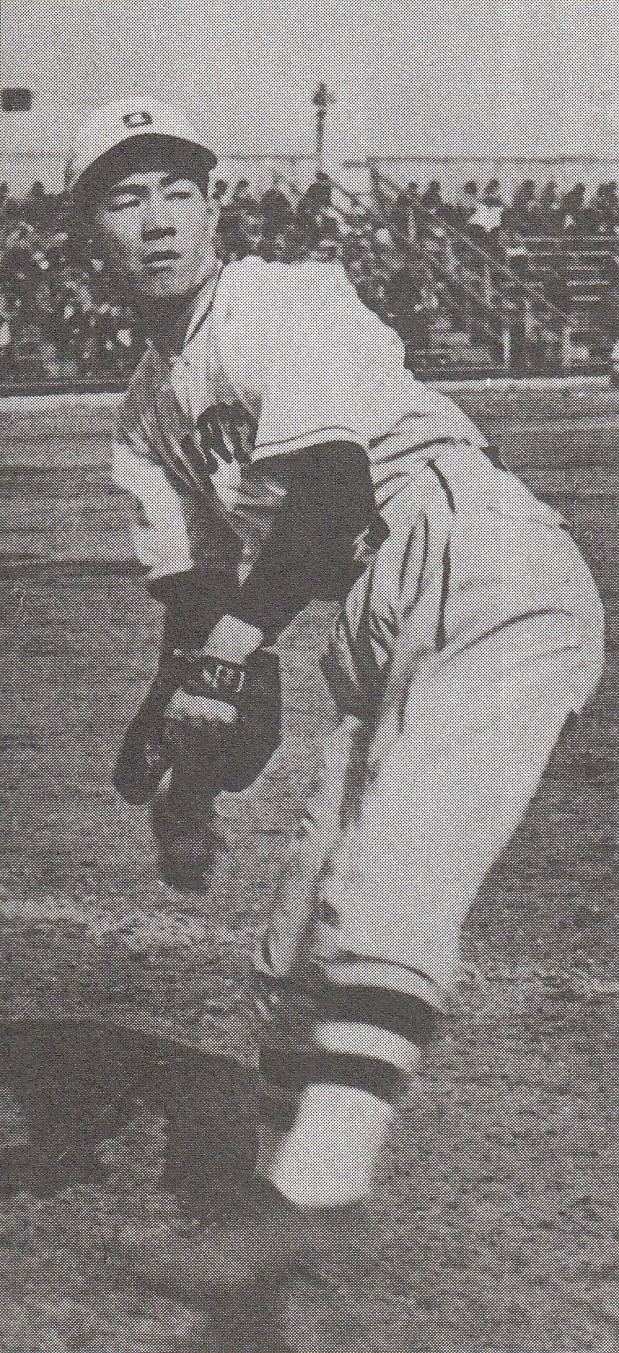
- Pitcher
- Born: February 1, 1917; Ujiyamada, Mie, Japan
- Died: December 2, 1944 (aged 27); SS Hawaii Maru, Pacific Ocean, off Yakushima, Japan

Japanese Baseball League debut
- July 1, 1936, for the Tokyo Kyojin

Last appearance
- October 24, 1943, for the Tokyo Kyojin

NPB statistics
- Win–loss record: 63–22
- Earned run average: 1.74
- Strikeouts: 554

Teams
- As player: Tokyo Kyojin (1936–1937, 1940–1941, 1943)

Career highlights and awards
- 4× Japanese Baseball League champion (1936 Fall), (1940), (1941), (1943); Japanese Triple Crown (1937 Spring); Japanese Baseball League MVP (1937 Spring); Pitched three no-hitters; Yomiuri Giants #14 retired

Member of the Japanese

Baseball Hall of Fame
- Induction: 1959

Eiji Sawamura (沢村 栄治, Sawamura Eiji; February 1, 1917 – December 2, 1944) was a Japanese professional baseball player. A right-handed pitcher, he played in Japan for the Yomiuri Giants. He is one of just two pitchers in Japanese baseball history to throw three no-hitters (the other being Yoshiro Sotokoba) and the only one to do so for thirty years. He is one of just six numbers to be retired by the Giants in their history.

== Early life ==
On November 20, 1934, the 17-year-old Sawamura faced a team of visiting all-star players from Major League Baseball, including Babe Ruth, Jimmie Foxx, Lou Gehrig, and Charlie Gehringer. Entering the game in the fourth inning, the high school pitcher struck out nine batters and held the Americans to a single run over five innings pitched; a home run by Gehrig in the seventh saddled Sawamura with the loss. However, he did manage to strike out Gehringer, Ruth, Gehrig, and Foxx in succession.

== Professional career ==
The national attention of the 1934 exhibition game led to the formation of the Japanese Baseball League in 1936. Sawamura joined the Yomiuri Giants, which played in Tokyo and was owned by the Yomiuri Shimbun newspaper. He became one of their aces. He pitched the first no-hitter in Japanese pro baseball, on September 25, 1936, and added two others (May 1, 1937 and July 6, 1940). In 1937, he went 33–10 with a 1.38 earned run average and was the named the league's Most Valuable Player. From 1937 to 1943, Sawamura accumulated 105 games pitched, a career record of 63-22, 554 strikeouts and a 1.74 ERA.

== Personal life ==
Sawamura was drafted into the imperial Japanese army in 1939. He would be released from duties during baseball seasons, including after the Japanese attack on Pearl Harbor on Dec. 7, 1941. He pitched in the 1942 and 1943 seasons, but not the truncated 1944 season (No pro games were played in 1945).

Sawamura was among soldiers of the 23rd Infantry Division boarded on the troop ship SS Hawaii Maru in early December 1944, bound for Borneo via Japanese-occupied Manila in the Philippines. At 0400 on Dec. 2, 1944, the ship was torpedoed and sunk by USS Sea Devil off Yakushima, an island south of Kyushu. More than 2,000 soldiers and sailors were killed, with none surviving the sinking.

Sawamura was inducted into the Japanese Baseball Hall of Fame in 1959. The Sawamura Award, which is given to the best pitchers in the League since 1947, is named in his honor.

== See also ==
- The Victory Season: The End of World War II and the Birth of Baseball's Golden Age
- 27 Club

Awards
Preceded by None	Japanese Baseball League MVP; 1937 (Spring)	Succeeded by Harris McGalliard
