= USS Sea Devil (SS-400) =

Submarine of the United States

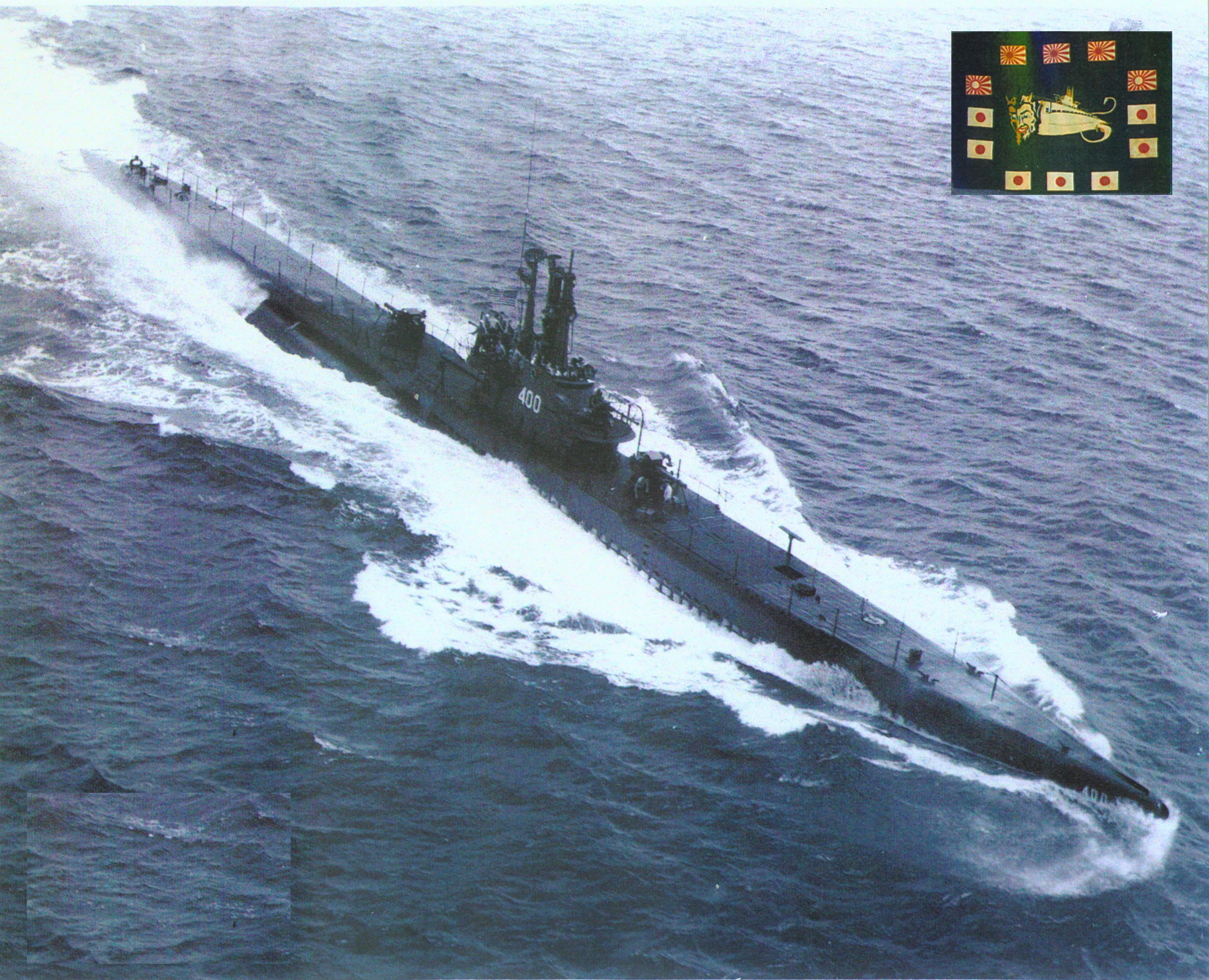
- USS Sea Devil (SS-400)

History

United States
- Name: USS Sea Devil
- Namesake: The sea devil, also known as the manta ray and devil ray
- Builder: Portsmouth Naval Shipyard, Kittery, Maine
- Laid down: 18 November 1943
- Launched: 28 February 1944
- Sponsored by: Mrs. Sherman K. Kennedy
- Commissioned: 24 May 1944
- Decommissioned: 9 September 1948
- Recommissioned: 3 March 1951
- Decommissioned: 19 February 1954
- Recommissioned: 17 August 1957
- Reclassified: Auxiliary submarine (AGSS-400) 1 July 1960
- Decommissioned: 17 February 1964
- Stricken: 1 April 1964
- Fate: Sunk as a target off southern California 24 November 1964

General characteristics
- Class & type: Balao class diesel-electric submarine
- Displacement: 1,526 long tons (1,550 t) surfaced; 2,391 tons (2,429 t) submerged
- Length: 311 ft 6 in (94.95 m)
- Beam: 27 ft 3 in (8.31 m)
- Draft: 16 ft 10 in (5.13 m) maximum
- Propulsion: 4 × Fairbanks-Morse Model 38D8-⅛ 10-cylinder opposed piston diesel engines driving electrical generators; 2 × 126-cell Sargo batteries; 4 × high-speed Elliott electric motors with reduction gears; two propellers; 5,400 shp (4.0 MW) surfaced; 2,740 shp (2.0 MW) submerged
- Speed: 20.25 knots (38 km/h) surfaced; 8.75 knots (16 km/h) submerged
- Range: 11,000 nautical miles (20,000 km) surfaced at 10 kn (19 km/h)
- Endurance: 48 hours at 2 knots (3.7 km/h) submerged; 75 days on patrol
- Test depth: 400 ft (120 m)
- Complement: 10 officers, 70–71 enlisted
- Armament: 10 × 21-inch (533 mm) torpedo tubes; 6 forward, 4 aft; 24 torpedoes; 1 × 5-inch (127 mm) / 25 caliber deck gun; Bofors 40 mm and Oerlikon 20 mm cannon

USS Sea Devil (SS/AGSS-400), a Balao-class submarine, was the first ship of the United States Navy to be named for the sea devil (Manta birostria), the largest of all rays, noted for power and endurance.

== Construction and commissioning ==
Sea Devil's keel was laid down 18 November 1943 at the Portsmouth Navy Yard in Kittery, Maine. She was launched on 28 February 1944 sponsored by Mrs. Sherman K. Kennedy, and commissioned on 24 May 1944.

== World War II ==
=== First war patrol, September – October 1944 ===
Completing shakedown training at New London, Connecticut, Sea Devil departed that port on 11 July 1944 and arrived at her home port, Pearl Harbor, on 9 August to join Submarine Division (SubDiv) 281 and prepare for her first war patrol. On 3 September, she sailed west. By 15 September, she was 500 miles (800 km) off Honshū, and, during the early morning darkness, made contact with her first enemy ships — two sampan-type patrol vessels. Rough seas, however, precluded an attack, and she continued on to patrol in the shipping lanes to Japan's major ports: Yokohama, Kobe, and Osaka.

On 16 September, at 04:32, Sea Devil made her second contact; submerged; and commenced closing the target. At 05:38, the enemy, a cargo submarine, was sighted. At 05:45, Sea Devil made her first attack. Four torpedoes were fired. Two exploded against the target. Sea Devil lost depth control. A minute later, periscope depth was regained. Brown smoke marked the enemy's previous location. Seven underwater explosions followed. By 05:53, a large oil slick covered the site where the Japanese submarine I-364 had gone down.

Sea Devil reloaded and continued to move closer to Japan. On 17 September and 18 September, mountainous seas inhibited hunting. On 21 September, the submarine commenced running along the 100 fathoms (180 m) curve, but the strong Kuroshio Current there caused her to lose ground and forced her to shift her course.

On the morning of 22 September, she made several contacts, but all were too small. During the early afternoon, she sighted a small convoy and fired on a freighter. The target turned toward the submarine. Sea Devil went deep. An hour later, the surface ships had gone and the hunted submarine again became a hunter.

During her remaining 22 days on station, Sea Devil attacked several targets, but scored on none. In mid-October, she headed for Majuro for refit, and, on 19 November, she got underway for the waters west of the Nansei Shoto.

=== Second war patrol, November – December 1944 ===
At the end of the month, Sea Devil entered the East China Sea and turned toward the Kyūshū coast. On 1 December, just prior to midnight, she made radar contact with a distant convoy and commenced running with the state-five sea on four engines to gain position. At 02:39 on 2 December, she changed course to close the convoy. A minute later, she took a wave over the bridge which knocked the starboard lookout onto the bridge deck; flooded the main induction and both engine rooms to the lower deck plates; and sent water through the supply line into the after battery compartment, the crew's mess, and the radio shack. A solid stream came into the control room via the conning tower. But, other than numerous electrical grounds, no damage was sustained.

By 03:20, Sea Devil was 1,200 yards (1,100 m) ahead and 3,000 yards (3,000 m) off the port track of the convoy. The radar showed 11 definite targets and indicated the presence of others. Weather and visibility, however, worked against a night surface attack.

At 03:22, a floating naval mine was sighted less than 100 yards (91 m) off the port bow. Sea Devil swung right with full rudder. Ten minutes later, she submerged and commenced her approach, heading for the port flank of the convoy.

By 04:00, the moon had clouded over. Periscope observations became progressively more difficult. At 04:13, an escort, pinging, passed Sea Devil close aboard. Sound conditions were also poor.

At 04:14 Sea Devil commenced firing. Four Mark-18 torpedoes headed for a medium-sized freighter, but all missed. At 04:24, she fired tubes five and six at a large ship 600 yards (500 m) away. Forty seconds later, the torpedoes hit, throwing a huge column of debris into the air. The stricken ship was troopship Hawaii Maru with some 2,000 soldiers on board. At 04:25, Sea Devil swung right to avoid an escort ahead of the ships in the center column. By 04:27, water was over the deck of the Hawaii Maru. There were no survivors. At 04:28, another escort passed Sea Devil. A minute later, Sea Devil launched four torpedoes from her stern tubes at a large passenger ship 1,300 yards (1,200 m) away, the Akikawa Maru. A look around through the periscope then revealed a larger freighter in the center column less than 150 yards (140 m) away and headed directly for the submarine.

Sea Devil went deep. At 04:30, she was jolted by a tremendous explosion. Her torpedoes had hit, and from the concussion it appeared that the ship had been carrying ammunition. Breaking up noises quickly followed the explosion. Former Japanese professional baseball player, Eiji Sawamura lost his life in the attack, together with some 300 other Japanese soldiers.

Sea Devil leveled off at 500 feet (150 m) and rigged for depth charging. Twelve were counted; none was close. Escorts milled about overhead for the next 40 minutes; then the sound of screws faded out. Pinging was heard for a while longer, and distant depth charges were heard for several hours.

After sinking Akikawa Maru and Hawaii Maru, Sea Devil continued to patrol the sea lanes to Kyūshū. On 4 December, she received a positive ship contact report from a China-based B-29 Superfortress, but the position was too distant. On 5 December, she sighted only two small fishing trawlers. Then, on the evening of 8 December, she made radar contact with four distant targets zigging on various courses toward Nagasaki.

Sea Devil went to full power on four engines and began gaining slowly. At 16,000 yards (15,000 m), the radar pips were estimated to be one battleship or aircraft carrier, two light cruisers, and four destroyers. Darkness and intermittent rain squalls interfered with visibility.

By 00:00, 9 December, Sea Devil had gained a good position 10,000 yards (10,000 m) ahead of the nearest escort and 3,000 yards (3,000 m) off the port track of the largest pip. At 00:05, she began a submerged radar approach. At 00:17, she began tracking by sound, and, ten minutes later she fired four Mark-23 torpedoes at the target. Two hit. Poor visibility precluded a damage assessment.

Sea Devil went deep and rigged for depth charging but, by 00:50, the sounds of searching surface ships faded out. At 01:07, the submarine surfaced and headed up the target's track. An hour later, she reversed her course and headed back to her patrol area. That evening sister ship Plaice (SS-390) confirmed Sea Devil’s hits, but was unable to provide a damage estimate. Later reports identified the damaged ship as the aircraft carrier Junyō, which was subsequently damaged further by submarine Redfish (SS-395). Junyō remained in the repair yard through the end of the war.

At mid-month, Sea Devil moved further south to patrol off Okinawa; and, on 29 December, she headed for Midway Island and Pearl Harbor.

=== Third war patrol, February – April 1945 ===
On 7 February 1945, Sea Devil cleared Pearl Harbor for her third war patrol. On 19 February, she arrived at Saipan for training in wolfpack tactics, and, on 27 February, she sailed for the Yellow Sea in company with submarines Tench (SS-417), Guardfish (SS-217), and Balao (SS-285). At the end of the month, she was diverted to search for downed aviators; and, on 3 March, she continued on to her patrol area to further decrease the declining traffic between China and Manchuria, and the Japanese home islands.

For over a week, fishing junks, sailing junks, and floating naval mines provided the only contacts. On 24 February, she sighted a large tanker with four escorts but lost the convoy. On 25 February, she sighted and evaded a Japanese hunter-killer group. On 29 February, she sank or exploded four mines and attempted to do the same to two others.

Fog shrouded her area during the last days of the month. On 2 April, visibility was still poor, less than 1,000 yards (1,000 m). At 07:10, she made radar contact with an enemy convoy-four merchantmen and three escorts. At 09:15, she commenced firing at the lead merchant ship. Forty seconds later, she fired at the next ship. She then swung around to bring her stern tubes to bear on a third merchant ship; found herself well inside the escort on the convoy's starboard quarter; continued swinging and fired three stern shots at the escort. Between 08:19 and 08:22, seven hits were heard and felt.

Sea Devil then left the formation and opened range to reload. The radar screen now showed only three small pips. The third torpedo of the first salvo had apparently missed its target and run on to hit the third maru.

After reloading, the submarine tracked the remaining units of the convoy. Shortly after 10:00, she fired on and damaged one of the escorts. Forty minutes later, she fired on the remaining merchantman and observed it suddenly disappear from the radar screen. After 11:00, she made her way through the wreckage to pick up survivors. Only four allowed themselves to be picked up; and, of these, one died of his wounds.

Of the seven ships, Sea Devil had sunk three — cargo ships Taijo Maru, Edogawa Maru, and Misshan Maru — and had damaged the fourth maru and at least one of the escorts.

The submarine remained in her Yellow Sea patrol area for another three days, then headed for Midway. On 6 April, however, she received orders to patrol south of Kyūshū, and, on 8 April, she was ordered closer to Okinawa in search of four downed United States Marine Corps Reserve pilots of U.S. Navy Bombing Fighter Squadron 83 (VBF-83). The pilots, from the aircraft carrier USS Essex (CV-9), had been covering the movements of the Japanese battleship Yamato and, on running low on fuel, had ditched in a location they thought to be near Okinawa. Prior to midnight on 8 April, Sea Devil located three of the pilots 200 nautical miles (370 km; 230 mi) northeast of Okinawa. The search for the fourth continued through the night. With dawn on 9 April, friendly planes joined in the search. But they, too, were unsuccessful; and, in the late afternoon Sea Devil continued southeastward. On the evening of 9 April, a VBF-83 pilot testing the guns of his F4U Corsair fighter inadvertently fired toward Sea Devil while she was on the surface, and one tracer round almost struck Sea Devil′s officer of the deck.

=== Fourth war patrol, May – July 1945 ===
On 13 April, Sea Devil arrived at Saipan. On 20 April, she completed her patrol, for which she was awarded the Navy Unit Commendation, at Midway Island. On 28 May, she was back at Saipan, and, on 30 May, she, along with submarines Ronquil (SS-396) and Paddle (SS-263), got underway. On 6 June, she entered the East China Sea via Tokara Kaikyo and headed northward to the Yellow Sea. On 7 June, she made her way through the islands of southwestern Korea; and, on 8 June, she commenced patrolling between the Shantung peninsula and Korea.

On the afternoon of 14 June, a cargo ship, with an escort on either side, was sighted through the high periscope. Sea Devil submerged, maneuvered into position; launched four torpedoes "down-the-throat," then changed course radically to avoid a collision with the target. Twenty-three seconds after firing, two of the torpedoes hit the target. Wakamiyasan Maru went under. Her escorts dropped depth charges. Five were fairly close. Sea Devil dropped below a 20-degree temperature gradient and worked her way out.

On the morning of 21 June, she sighted three armed trawlers, one under tow, headed from Shantung toward Korea. At 09:43, she surfaced and, three minutes later, commenced firing with her five-inch (127 mm) gun, 40 millimeter and 20 millimeter guns. The 40 millimeter soon jammed, but fire from the five-inch (127 mm) gun and 20 millimeter guns sank the trawler being towed and left a second burning and settling. The third, the towing vessel, cast loose and headed west under full steam. Sea Devil picked up three survivors and moved south to patrol in another area.

Poor weather impaired hunting during the next six days. On 27 June, however, she was able to take photographs of Saishu To and Chiri To; and, on 29 June she was diverted to search and rescue operations.

Assisted by a PB2Y Coronado and a PBM Mariner, she picked up a PBM crew from Rescue Squadron 4, Kerama Retto that had crashed while attempting the rescue of an Army United States Army Air Corps P-47 Thunderbolt pilot based at Ie Shima. Lt Archibald Gratz had bailed out of his P-47 a week earlier. Another man, who had become separated, was located by accompanying aircraft the following morning and was picked up before noon.

=== Fifth war patrol, August – September 1945 ===
Sea Devil remained on life guard duty in the northern Ryukyu Islands and southern Kyūshū area until 10 July, then headed east to Guam for refit and the installation of LORAN equipment and a radio direction finder. On 9 August, she headed back to the Yellow Sea. On 14 August, she transited the Nansei Shoto, passing south of Akuseki Shima; and, on 15 August, after entering her patrol area, she received word of Japan's acceptance of Allied surrender terms.

For another two weeks, Sea Devil remained in the area, looking for and sinking naval mines. On 27 August, she sighted a fishing vessel near a mine. Closer inspection showed that the fisherman was using the mine as a buoy and had secured his net to the mine horns. On 28 August, the submarine was ordered to Guam, then diverted to Subic Bay, where she arrived on 3 September.

Within a few weeks, Sea Devil was joined by seven other submarines of the new, postwar submarine squadron, SubRon 5. Through the fall, she operated out of Subic Bay, conducting intensive training operations necessitated by a heavy turnover in personnel. On 1 December, she sailed for San Francisco, California, for overhaul and, on 23 April 1946, she returned to her home port, Pearl Harbor.

== 1946–1964 ==
Three days later, SS-400 again headed west. On 16 May, she returned to Subic Bay; and, on 23 May, she continued on to Tsingtao where she provided antisubmarine warfare training services to TF 71 into July. On 5 May, she sailed for Shanghai, whence she proceeded back to Pearl Harbor. From 26 July 1946 to 5 May 1947, she conducted operations in the Hawaiian area. Overhaul at Mare Island took her through the summer. In early October, she returned to Hawaii, and on 27 May, she sailed westward for another tour in the Far East.

A simulated war patrol and the provision of ASW training services occupied her during her deployment; and, on 8 January 1948, she returned to Pearl Harbor whence she operated until ordered to Mare Island for inactivation.

Sea Devil was decommissioned on 10 September 1948 and remained in the inactive reserve through the end of the decade. Two months after the outbreak of hostilities in Korea, however, she was ordered activated; and, on 2 March 1951, she was recommissioned, assigned to SubDiv 71, SubRon 7, and based at Pearl Harbor.

Through the summer, Sea Devil operated in Hawaiian waters. In September, she returned to the west coast to provide ASW training services for Fleet Air Wing 4 in the Puget Sound area. In mid-November, she returned to Hawaii, where she conducted local operations through the winter. From mid-April to mid-June 1952, she underwent overhaul at the Pearl Harbor Naval Shipyard; then resumed local operations. In late September, she sailed west for her first deployment to the western Pacific since recommissioning.

Sea Devil arrived at Yokosuka on 7 October and commenced providing services to TF 96, which conducted ASW training exercises and maintained preparedness for hunter-killer operations in support of the United Nations effort. In late January 1953, she was detached for patrol purposes. Toward the end of January, she returned to Yokosuka, and, on 3 March, she sailed for Pearl Harbor.

On 30 June, Sea Devil again got under way for Puget Sound where she provided services to Fleet Air Wing 4 before heading for San Francisco on 20 August to begin inactivation. On 28 August, she was placed in commission, in reserve; and, on 19 February 1954, she was decommissioned.

Three years later, Sea Devil was again activated; and, on 17 August 1957, she was recommissioned and assigned to SubRon 5 at San Diego, California. For the next year, she conducted training operations off southern California and in the Puget Sound area, then prepared for deployment to the western Pacific. From November 1958 to April 1959, she provided services to Seventh Fleet surface units and to Fleet Marine Force Pacific. In May, she returned to San Diego. On 1 July 1960, she was redesignated an auxiliary submarine with hull classification symbol AGSS-400; and, from that time through 1963, she was primarily engaged in training operations off the West Coast. Only two deployments to the western Pacific during February–August 1961 and June–December 1963 interrupted that schedule.

== Decommissioning and disposal ==
In 1964 Sea Devil commenced inactivation for the last time. On 17 February 1964, she was decommissioned. Her name was struck from the Naval Vessel Register on 1 April 1964, and she was sunk as a target off Southern California on 24 November 1964.

== Awards ==
Sea Devil earned five battle stars for her World War II service.
