= Hawaii Maru =

World War II Japanese troop transport

History

Japan
- Builder: Kawasaki Shipbuilding Corporation (Kobe)
- Launched: 18 May 1915
- In service: 1915-1944
- Out of service: 2 December 1944
- Fate: Sunk, 2 December 1944

General characteristics
- Type: Troop transport
- Tonnage: 9,482 tons
- Length: 144.8 m (475 ft 1 in)
- Beam: 18.6 m (61 ft 0 in)
- Draught: 12.5 m (41 ft 0 in)
- Speed: 14 knots (26 km/h; 16 mph)

Hawaii Maru was a 9,482-ton Japanese troop transport during World War II, which sank on 2 December 1944 with great loss of life.

The ship was built in 1915 by the Kawasaki Shipbuilding Corporation in Kobe for the Osaka Shosen Kaisha shipping company. It served as an ocean liner and sailed to Vancouver, Seattle, New Orleans, Cape Town, and Buenos Aires.

On 29 September 1941, Hawaii Maru was requisitioned by the Japanese Imperial Army as a troop transport-ship and was used as such during the invasion of the Philippines. In April 1943 the ship transported some 1,000 Dutch prisoners from Singapore to Moji Port. Several Dutch soldiers died during the three-week journey. On 26 November 1943 Hawaii Maru again transported 1,230 Dutch and 150 British POWs from Singapore to Moji, and survived an attack of B-25 Mitchell bombers, which sank Hakone Maru. On 27 April 1944, Hawaii Maru was hit by a torpedo fired by the American submarine USS Trigger, but stayed afloat.

On 30 November 1944, Hawaii Maru sailed as a troop transport from Moji, Japan for Miri, Borneo via Manila in convoy MI-29. On 2 December 1944 around 04h00, the convoy was attacked by US Navy submarine USS Sea Devil in the East China Sea west of Yakushima Island (30°24′N 128°17′E). Hawaii Maru was hit and sank quickly; 1,843 troops of the IJA 23rd Infantry Division, 60 other troops, 83 gunners and 148 crewmen were killed, including legendary Nippon Professional Baseball pitcher Eiji Sawamura.

== See also ==
- Hell ship
- List by death toll of ships sunk by submarines
- List of maritime disasters in World War II
