= Shinichi Kondō =

Japanese baseball player and coach

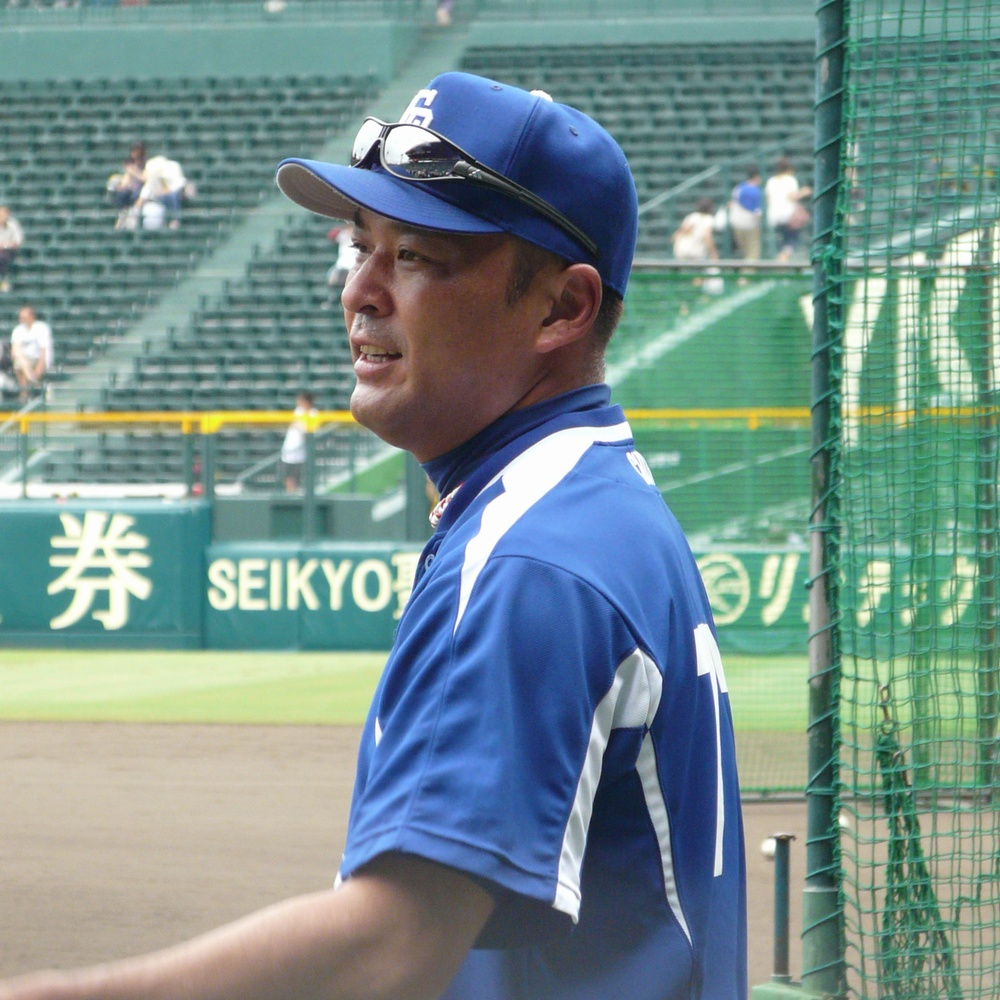
- Pitching Coach/ Scout
- Born: September 8, 1968 (age 57)
- Batted: Left Threw: Left

NPB debut
- 9 August, 1987, for the Chunichi Dragons

Last NPB appearance
- 15 October, 1993, for the Chunichi Dragons

NPB statistics (through 1993)
- Win–loss record: 12–17
- ERA: 3.90
- Strikeouts: 157
- Stats at Baseball Reference

Teams
- As player: Chunichi Dragons (1987–1993); As coach: Chunichi Dragons (2003–2018)

Career highlights and awards
- 1x No-hitter on debut (1987); 1x Monthly MVP (Central League) (August 1987)

Shinichi Kondō (近藤 真市, Kondō Shin'ichi; born September 8, 1968 in Ichinomiya, Aichi Prefecture) is a former Japanese professional baseball pitcher who played for the Chunichi Dragons in Japan's Nippon Professional Baseball. He has been a pitching coach for the Dragons since 2003.

Kondō had a shortened career due to a consistent arm injury that forced him into early retirement.

On 8 August 1987, Kondō became the first player in Japanese baseball history to throw a no-hitter on debut in a 6-0 victory over the Yomiuri Giants.

He is the father of former Dragons outfielder, Hiroki Kondō.

== Jersey number ==
- 13 (1987, 1992-1994)
- 1 (1988-1991)
- 125 (1995) (Batting pitcher)
- 76 (2003-2018)

== See also ==
- Bumpus Jones
- List of Nippon Professional Baseball no-hitters
