= Perfect game (baseball) =

Game where at least one team has no baserunners

The "everlasting image" of New York Yankees catcher Yogi Berra leaping into the arms of pitcher Don Larsen after the completion of Larsen's perfect game in Game 5 of the 1956 World Series

In baseball, a perfect game is a game in which one or more pitchers complete a minimum of nine innings with no batter from the opposing team reaching base safely. To achieve a perfect game, a team must not allow any opposing player to reach base by any means: no hits, walks, hit batsmen, catcher's interference, fielder's obstruction, and no fielding error, or uncaught third strike that allows a batter to reach base.

A perfect game, by definition, is also a no-hitter, and is guaranteed to result in a win and a shutout if the game does not go into extra innings. In leagues that use a WBSC tiebreaker (including MLB since 2020), runners are placed on second base, and in some leagues, also on first base at the start of each half-inning during extra innings; this automatic runner would not cause a perfect game to be lost. Therefore, if the runner advances and scores without any batters reaching base (by means of stolen base, sacrifice, fielder's choice, etc.), and this turns out to be the winning run, then the losing team will still be credited with a perfect game, despite losing the game. A fielding error that does not allow a batter to reach base, such as a misplayed foul ball, does not spoil a perfect game. Games that last fewer than nine innings, regardless of cause, in which a team has no baserunners do not qualify as perfect games. Games in which a team reaches first base only in extra innings also do not qualify as perfect games.

The first known use of the term perfect game was in 1908; its definition was formalized in 1991. In Major League Baseball (MLB), it has been achieved 24 times – 22 times since the modern era began in 1901, most recently by Domingo Germán of the New York Yankees on June 28, 2023, against the Oakland Athletics. Although it is theoretically possible for two or more pitchers to pitch a combined perfect game in the MLB (similar to combined no-hitters, which have occurred 22 times in MLB history), every MLB perfect game has been thrown by a single pitcher. A combined perfect game occurred in Game 5 of the 2007 Japan Series of Nippon Professional Baseball.

== Rule definition ==
The Major League Baseball definition of a perfect game is an adjunct to the decision made by the Committee for Statistical Accuracy on September 4, 1991, to redefine a no-hitter as a game in which the pitcher or pitchers on one team throw a complete game of nine innings or more without surrendering a hit. That decision removed some games that had long appeared in the record books: those lasting fewer than nine innings, and those in which a team went hitless in regulation but then got a hit in extra innings. The definition of perfect game parallels this redefinition of the no-hitter, in effect substituting "baserunner" for "hit". As a result of the 1991 redefinition, for instance, Harvey Haddix does not receive credit for a perfect game or a no-hitter for his performance on May 26, 1959, when he threw 12 perfect innings against the Milwaukee Braves before a batter reached in the 13th.

Since MLB implemented the softball WBSC tie-breaker in 2020, the offensive team is awarded a free runner on second base each half-inning during extra innings. This in itself would not end a perfect game, even if the runner scores or is erased on a double play. Another rule change effective for two seasons (2020 and 2021) stipulated that games that are part of doubleheaders last only seven innings. Such a game in which one team did not reach first base would not have been credited as a perfect game (similar to weather-shortened games). However, if such a doubleheader game were to have at least two extra innings and one team still did not reach first base, then the game would have been credited as a perfect game. During those two seasons, no potential perfect games were affected but there were two potential no-hitters affected.

Both rule changes were expected to be reversed prior to the 2022 season, but the international tiebreaker was permanently added to the Official rules of Major League Baseball regular season rules in February 2023. The WBSC tiebreaker is not used in postseason play.

== History in MLB ==
The first known occurrence of the term perfect game in print was in 1908. I. E. Sanborn's report for the Chicago Tribune about Addie Joss's performance against the White Sox calls it "an absolutely perfect game, without run, without hit, and without letting an opponent reach first base by hook or crook, on hit, walk, or error, in nine innings". Several sources have claimed that the first recorded usage of perfect game was by Ernest J. Lanigan in his Baseball Cyclopedia, made in reference to Charlie Robertson's 1922 perfect game. The Chicago Tribune came close to the term in describing Lee Richmond's game for Worcester in 1880: "Richmond was most effectively supported, every position on the home nine being played to perfection." Similarly, in writing up John Montgomery Ward's 1880 perfect game, the New York Clipper described the "perfect play" of Providence's defense.

There has been one perfect game in the World Series, thrown by Don Larsen for the New York Yankees against the Brooklyn Dodgers on October 8, 1956. By coincidence, Larsen, and the catcher for that game, Yogi Berra, were in attendance when Yankee pitcher David Cone threw a perfect game in 1999. Larsen and Berra had been invited to throw and catch the ceremonial first pitch.

Ron Hassey is the only catcher in MLB history to have caught more than one perfect game. His first was with pitcher Len Barker (for the Cleveland Indians against the Toronto Blue Jays) in 1981 and his second was with pitcher Dennis Martínez (for the Montreal Expos against the Los Angeles Dodgers) in 1991.

The most recent perfect game for MLB occurred on June 28, 2023, with Domingo Germán of the New York Yankees against the Oakland Athletics in an 11–0 victory, finishing with 9 strikeouts. Germán became the first-ever pitcher born in the Dominican Republic to throw a perfect game in the MLB, as well as the third-ever non-American-born player to do so, and was the first pitcher to throw a perfect game with the pitch clock and batting clock rules in effect.

== History in NPB ==
In Nippon Professional Baseball (NPB), the first perfect game was thrown by Hideo Fujimoto of the Giants on June 28, 1950, against the Nishi Nippon Pirates. 16 total have been thrown in NPB, with the most recent perfect game for NPB by Chiba Lotte Marines pitcher Rōki Sasaki on April 10, 2022. Sasaki tied an existing NPB record by striking out 19 batters, and set a new world record by striking out 13 consecutive batters. Sasaki compiled a game score of 106, surpassing the 105 for Kerry Wood's 20 strikeout game from the 1998 Major League Baseball season, which was the highest MLB game score since the end of the baseball color line. On November 1, 2007, a combined perfect game was thrown by the Chunichi Dragons during Game 5 of the 2007 Japan Series. Starting pitcher Daisuke Yamai pitched eight perfect innings and received the win, with Hitoki Iwase pitching a perfect ninth inning and receiving the save; the Dragons' victory also resulted in them winning the Japan Series. Although NPB does not recognize this as a perfect game due to it not being a complete game, it is recognized as a perfect game by the World Baseball Softball Confederation. This makes it the only perfect game thrown during the Japan Series, and the only combined perfect game in history to span a regulation nine innings.

== In other leagues ==
The All-American Girls Professional Baseball League (AAGPBL) existed from 1943 to 1954. Four of its players pitched a perfect game: Annabelle Lee on July 29, 1944, Carolyn Morris in 1945, Doris Sams in 1947, and Jean Faut in 1951 (against the Rockford Peaches) and again in 1953 (against the Kalamazoo Lassies). Faut is the only professional baseball player, male or female, to have pitched two perfect games.

On August 23, 1957, Ángel Macías (12) from the Monterrey, Mexico, team pitched the only perfect game of the Little League World Series, in Williamsport, Pennsylvania. Macías struck out 11 out of the 18 batters he faced (Little League games are 6 innings).

The only perfect game thrown in Chinese Professional Baseball League play was by Ryan Verdugo of the Uni-President Lions on October 7, 2018, against the Chinatrust Brothers, in a game where Kuo Fu-Lin had to hit a walk-off home run in the bottom of the ninth to win the game and preserve the perfect game, 1-0.

Four Puerto Rico pitchers combined for an 8-inning perfect game against Israel in the 2023 World Baseball Classic. Starter José De León recorded ten strikeouts in 5 2/3 innings, and relievers Yacksel Rios, Edwin Diaz, and Duane Underwood Jr. recorded seven more outs before the game ended early because of the mercy rule. It was ruled to not be an official perfect game by the Elias Sports Bureau as they stipulate that a perfect game must last at least 9 innings. De León responded to this saying "It's perfect for us".

== See also ==
- Harvey Haddix's near-perfect game
- Armando Galarraga's near-perfect game
- Eight-ender in curling
- Golden set in tennis
- Maximum break in snooker
- Nine-dart finish in darts
- Perfect game in bowling
- The Perfect Game, 2009 film

== Sources ==
- Alvarez, Mark, ed. (1993). The Perfect Game: A Classic Collection of Facts, Figures, Stories and Characters from the Society for American Baseball Research (Taylor). ISBN 0-87833-815-2
- Anderson, David W. (2000). More Than Merkle: A History of the Best and Most Exciting Baseball Season in Human History (Lincoln and London: University of Nebraska Press). ISBN 0-8032-1056-6
- Browning, Reed (2003). Cy Young: A Baseball Life (Amherst: University of Massachusetts Press). ISBN 1-55849-398-0
- Buckley Jr., James (2002). Perfect: The Inside Story of Baseball's Seventeen Perfect Games (Triumph Books). ISBN 1-57243-454-6
- Chen, Albert (2009). "The Greatest Game Ever Pitched", Sports Illustrated (June 1; available online Archived 2014-02-03 at the Wayback Machine).
- Coffey, Michael (2004). 27 Men Out: Baseball's Perfect Games (New York: Atria Books). ISBN 0-7434-4606-2
- Cook, William A. (2004). Waite Hoyt: A Biography of the Yankees' Schoolboy Wonder (Jefferson, N.C.: McFarland). ISBN 0786419601
- Deutsch, Jordan A. et al. (1975). The Scrapbook History of Baseball (New York: Bobbs-Merrill). ISBN 0-672-52028-1
- Deveaux, Tom (2001). The Washington Senators, 1901–1971 (Jefferson, N.C.: McFarland). ISBN 0-7864-0993-2
- Dewey, Donald, and Nicholas Acocella (1995). The Biographical History of Baseball (New York: Carroll & Graf). ISBN 1-57243-567-4
- Dickson, Paul (2009). The Dickson Baseball Dictionary, 3d ed. (New York: W. W. Norton). ISBN 0-393-06681-9
- Egan, James M. (2008). Base Ball on the Western Reserve: The Early Game in Cleveland and Northeast Ohio, Year by Year and Town by Town, 1865–1900 (Jefferson, N.C.: McFarland). ISBN 0-7864-3067-2
- Elston, Gene (2006). A Stitch in Time: A Baseball Chronology, 3d ed. (Houston, Tex.: Halcyon Press). ISBN 1-931823-33-2
- Fleitz, David L. (2004). Ghosts in the Gallery at Cooperstown: Sixteen Little-Known Members of the Hall of Fame (Jefferson, N.C.: McFarland). ISBN 0-7864-1749-8
- Forker, Dom, Robert Obojski, and Wayne Stewart (2004). The Big Book of Baseball Brainteasers (Sterling). ISBN 1-4027-1337-1
- Gallagher, Mark (2003). The Yankee Encyclopedia, 6th ed. (Champaign, Ill.: Sports Publishing LLC). ISBN 1-58261-683-3
- Hanlon, John (1968). "First Perfect Game In the Major Leagues", Sports Illustrated (August 26; available online).
- Holtzman, Jerome (June 2003). "Pitching perfection is in the eye of the beholder; for Woody Williams, a perfect game is whenever he picks up a victory". Baseball Digest. 62 (6). Archived from the original on December 28, 2011 – via FindArticles.
- James, Bill. The New Bill James Historical Baseball Abstract, rev. ed. (Simon and Schuster, 2003). ISBN 0-7432-2722-0
- Kennedy, Kostya (1996). "His Memory Is Perfect", Sports Illustrated (October 14; available online)
- Lewis, Allen (February 2002). "Eight hitless games entered the record books due to questionable scoring decisions - Statistical Data Included". Baseball Digest. 61 (2). Archived from the original on September 1, 2011 – via FindArticles.
- Lupica, Mike (1999). Summer of '98: When Homers Flew, Records Fell, and Baseball Reclaimed America (New York: G.P. Putnam's Sons). ISBN 0-399-14514-1
- McNeil, William F. (2003). The Dodgers Encyclopedia, 2d ed. (Champaign, Ill.: Sports Publishing LLC). ISBN 1-58261-633-7
- Nemec, David (2006 [1994]). The Official Rules of Baseball Illustrated (Guilford, Conn.: Globe Pequot). ISBN 1-59228-844-8
- Newman, Bruce (1981). "Perfect in Every Way", Sports Illustrated (May 25; available online).
- Nowlin, Bill (2005). "Rick Wise", in '75: The Red Sox Team That Saved Baseball, ed. Bill Nowlin and Cecilia Tan (Cambridge, Massachusetts: Rounder). ISBN 1-57940-127-9
- Okrent, Daniel, and Steve Wulf (1989). Baseball Anecdotes (New York and Oxford: Oxford University Press). ISBN 0-19-504396-0
- Reisler, Jim (2007). The Best Game Ever: Pirates vs. Yankees, October 13, 1960 (New York: Carroll & Graf). ISBN 0-7867-1943-5
- Robbins, Mike (2004). Ninety Feet from Fame: Close Calls with Baseball Immortality (New York: Carroll & Graf). ISBN 0-7867-1335-6
- Schneider, Russell (2005). The Cleveland Indians Encyclopedia, 3d ed. (Champaign, Ill.: Sports Publishing LLC). ISBN 1-58261-840-2
- Schott, Tom, and Nick Peters (2003). The Giants Encyclopedia (Champaign, Ill.: Sports Publishing LLC). ISBN 1-58261-693-0
- Simon, Thomas P., ed. (2004). Deadball Stars of the National League (Brassey's). ISBN 1-57488-860-9
- Sullivan, Dean, ed. (2002). Late Innings: A Documentary History of Baseball, 1945–1972 (Lincoln: University of Nebraska Press). ISBN 0-8032-9285-6
- Thielman, Jim (2005). Cool of the Evening: The 1965 Minnesota Twins (Minneapolis, Minn.: Kirk House Publishers). ISBN 1886513716
- Vass, George (1998). "Here Are the 13 Most Fascinating No-Hitters", Baseball Digest (June).
- Vass, George (August 2002). "Seven most improbable no-hitters: since 1901, there have been more than 200 hitless games in the major leagues with some being more unlikely than others". Baseball Digest. 61 (8). Archived from the original on July 7, 2012 – via FindArticles.
- Vass, George (June 2007). "One out away from fame: the final out of hitless games has often proved to be a pitcher's toughest conquest". Baseball Digest. 66 (4): 8. Archived from the original on July 28, 2009 – via FindArticles.
- Westcott, Rich (2005). Veterans Stadium: Field of Memories (Philadelphia: Temple University Press). ISBN 1-59213-428-9
- Young, Mark C. (1997). The Guinness Book of Sports Records (Guinness Media). ISBN 0-9652383-1-8
- Zingg, Paul J., and Mark D. Medeiros (1994). Runs, Hits, and an Era: the Pacific Coast League, 1903–58 (Champaign: University of Illinois Press). ISBN 0-252-06402-X
