= 2007 Japan Series =

Team (Wins)	Managers	Season
Chunichi Dragons (4)	Hiromitsu Ochiai	78–64–2, (.549), GB: 1.5
Hokkaido Nippon-Ham Fighters (1)	Trey Hillman	79–60–5, (.568), GA: 2
- Dates: October 27 – November 1
- MVP: Norihiro Nakamura (Chunichi)
- FSA: Yu Darvish (Hokkaido)

Broadcast
- Television: TV Asahi (ANN, Game 1); TV Tokyo (Game 2, 5, aired on 6 TXN stations, Gifu Broadcasting, Mie TV, Biwako Broadcasting, KBS Kyoto, Sun TV, Nara TV and TV Wakayama); Tokai TV and Fuji TV (Fuji Network, Game 3); CBC (JNN, Game 4)

The 2007 Japan Series, the 58th edition of Nippon Professional Baseball's championship series, began Saturday, October 27, 2007, pitting the Pacific League Regular League and Climax Series' Champion, the Hokkaido Nippon Ham Fighters, and the Chunichi Dragons, winners of the Central League's Climax Series, in a rematch of the previous year's Japan Series, won by the Fighters. It was the first championship for the Dragons since the 1954 Japan Series, marking the end of the longest championship drought in NPB history.

This was the first Japan Series to match the winners of the Climax Series in both leagues. In a virtual mirror image of the 2006 series, the Dragons won in the same manner that the Fighters had the previous year, losing the first game and sweeping the next four. In one of baseball's rare situations, for the first time in a recognised WBSC premiership championship final since the 1956 Major League Baseball championship series, and the first one to end a series in a major professional championship, a perfect game was pitched, although recognised only by international standards and not NPB because multiple pitchers were used because NPB's definition is different from most recognised authorities. This would also be the last time a perfect game was thrown in NPB until Roki Sasaki threw a perfect game against the Orix Buffaloes on April 10, 2022.

== Climax Series ==
First Stage
Central League
2	Chunichi Dragons	2
3	Hanshin Tigers	0
Pacific League
2	Chiba Lotte Marines	2
3	Fukuoka SoftBank Hawks	1

Final Stage
1	Yomiuri Giants	0
2	Chunichi Dragons	3
1	Hokkaido Nippon-Ham Fighters	3
2	Chiba Lotte Marines	2

Japan Series
CL2	Chunichi Dragons	4
PL1	Hokkaido Nippon-Ham Fighters	1

== Summary ==
Chunichi Dragons won the series, 4–1.

Game	Date	Score	Location	Time	Attendance
1	October 27	Chunichi Dragons – 1, Hokkaido Nippon-Ham Fighters – 3	Sapporo Dome	2:48	40,616
2	October 28	Chunichi Dragons – 8, Hokkaido Nippon-Ham Fighters – 1	Sapporo Dome	3:43	40,770
3	October 30	Hokkaido Nippon-Ham Fighters – 1, Chunichi Dragons – 9	Nagoya Dome	3:39	38,068
4	October 31	Hokkaido Nippon-Ham Fighters – 2, Chunichi Dragons – 4	Nagoya Dome	3:45	38,059
5	November 1	Hokkaido Nippon-Ham Fighters – 0, Chunichi Dragons – 1	Nagoya Dome	2:26	38,118

== Game summaries ==
=== Game 1 ===
Saturday, October 27, 2007, 6:15 pm (JST) at Sapporo Dome in Sapporo, Hokkaido
Team	1	2	3	4	5	6	7	8	9	R	H	E
Chunichi	0	0	0	0	0	1	0	0	0	1	4	0
Nippon-Ham	3	0	0	0	0	0	0	0	0	3	2	0
WP: Yu Darvish (1–0) LP: Kenshin Kawakami (0–1); Home runs: CHU: None; NHF: Fernando Seguignol (1)

=== Game 2 ===
Sunday, October 28, 2007, 6:15 pm (JST) at Sapporo Dome in Sapporo, Hokkaido
Team	1	2	3	4	5	6	7	8	9	R	H	E
Chunichi	1	0	0	3	0	2	2	0	0	8	8	0
Nippon-Ham	0	0	0	1	0	0	0	0	0	1	4	0
WP: Kenichi Nakata (1–0) LP: Ryan Glynn (0–1); Home runs: CHU: Lee Byung-Kyu (1), Masahiko Morino (1); NHF: Fernando Seguignol (2)

=== Game 3 ===
Tuesday, October 30, 2007, 6:10 pm (JST) at Nagoya Dome in Nagoya, Aichi Prefecture
Team	1	2	3	4	5	6	7	8	9	R	H	E
Nippon-Ham	0	1	0	0	0	0	0	0	0	1	9	0
Chunichi	7	2	0	0	0	0	0	0	X	9	12	0
WP: Kenta Asakura (1–0) LP: Masaru Takeda (0–1)

=== Game 4 ===
Wednesday, October 31, 2007, 6:12 pm (JST) at Nagoya Dome in Nagoya, Aichi Prefecture
Team	1	2	3	4	5	6	7	8	9	R	H	E
Nippon-Ham	0	0	0	1	1	0	0	0	0	2	7	1
Chunichi	2	0	0	0	1	0	1	0	X	4	5	1
WP: Yoshihiro Suzuki (1–0) LP: Mitsuo Yoshikawa (0–1) Sv: Hitoki Iwase (1)

=== Game 5 ===
Thursday, November 1, 2007, 6:10 pm (JST) at Nagoya Dome in Nagoya, Aichi Prefecture
Team	1	2	3	4	5	6	7	8	9	R	H	E
Nippon-Ham	0	0	0	0	0	0	0	0	0	0	0	0
Chunichi	0	1	0	0	0	0	0	0	X	1	5	0
WP: Daisuke Yamai (1–0) LP: Yu Darvish (1–1) Sv: Hitoki Iwase (2)

Daisuke Yamai was matched against Yu Darvish in the fifth ever game in Dragons history where they had a chance to clinch the Japan Series (having previously lost Game 6 and Game 7 in 2004). Tyrone Woods (the only batter to get two hits for the game) got on base with a hit in the second inning for Chunichi before Norihiro Nakamura delivered a double to get Woods closer to home. Ryosuke Hirata managed to deliver a flyball deep enough to get Woods home from third base to score. Yamai threw 86 pitches and struck out eight batters for Chunichi while Darvish went seven innings and allowed five hits with the one run. Hitoki Iwase was tasked to save the 9th inning for the Dragons and he threw 14 pitches before getting Eiichi Koyano to ground out to end the game and give the Dragons their first championship in 53 years.

This was the first no-hitter and perfect game in Japan Series history and the first since the 1956 MLB World Series Game 5 in a WBSC-recognised premiership.

However, as the definitions of a no-hitter and perfect game are different in NPB compared to what is globally recognised, NPB does not recognise the game as such due to it involving multiple pitchers while the game is recognised as a perfect game by the global governing body of baseball, the World Baseball Softball Confederation.

Third baseman Norihiro Nakamura was named Series MVP with his performance of 8 hits with a .444 batting average and four RBIs while Darvish was given the Fighting Spirit Award.

== See also ==
- 2007 Korean Series
- 2007 World Series
