= Okinawa Shogaku High School =

Coordinates: 26°12′01″N 127°41′57″E

- Japanese: 沖縄尚学高等学校・附属中学校
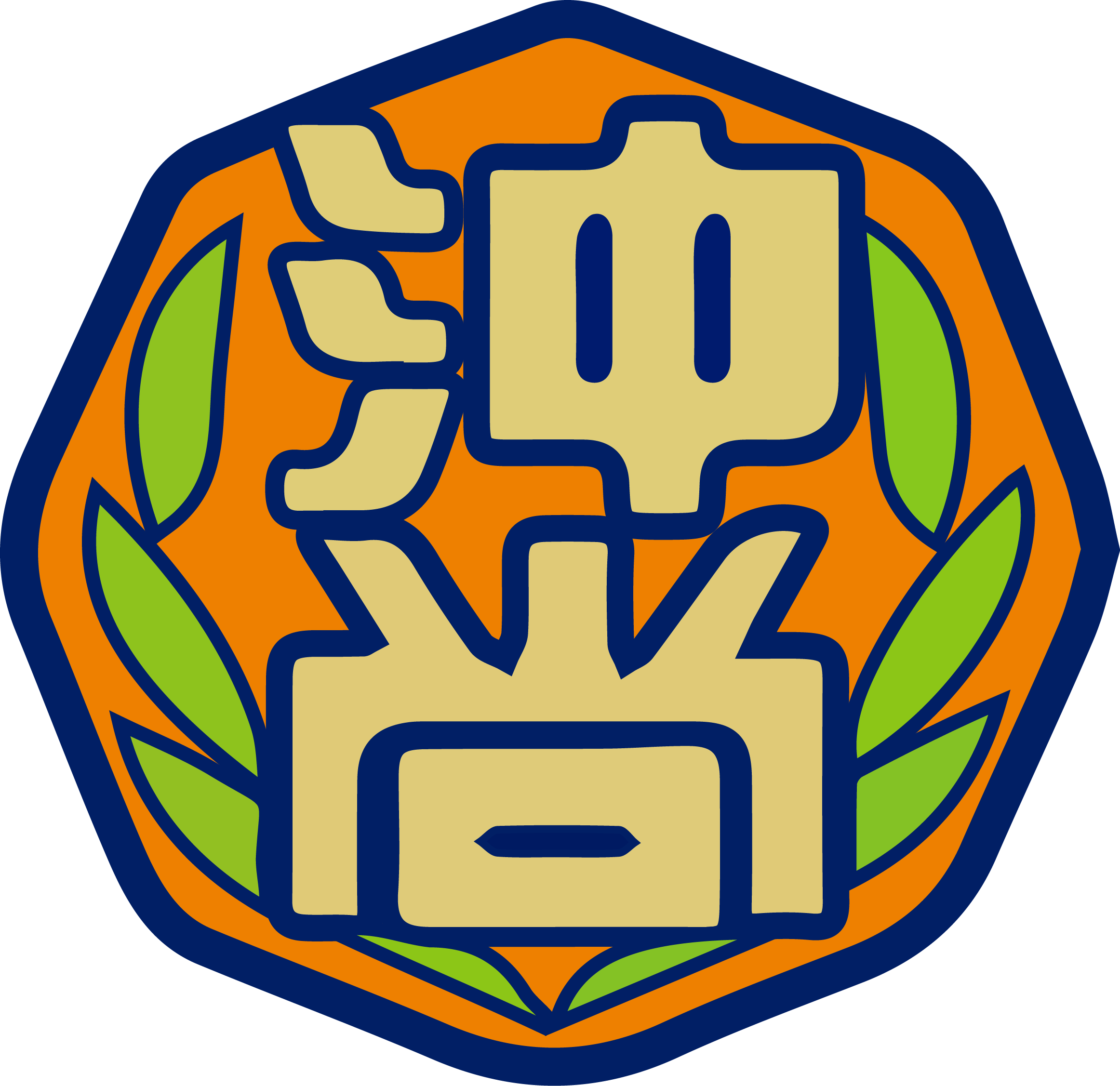

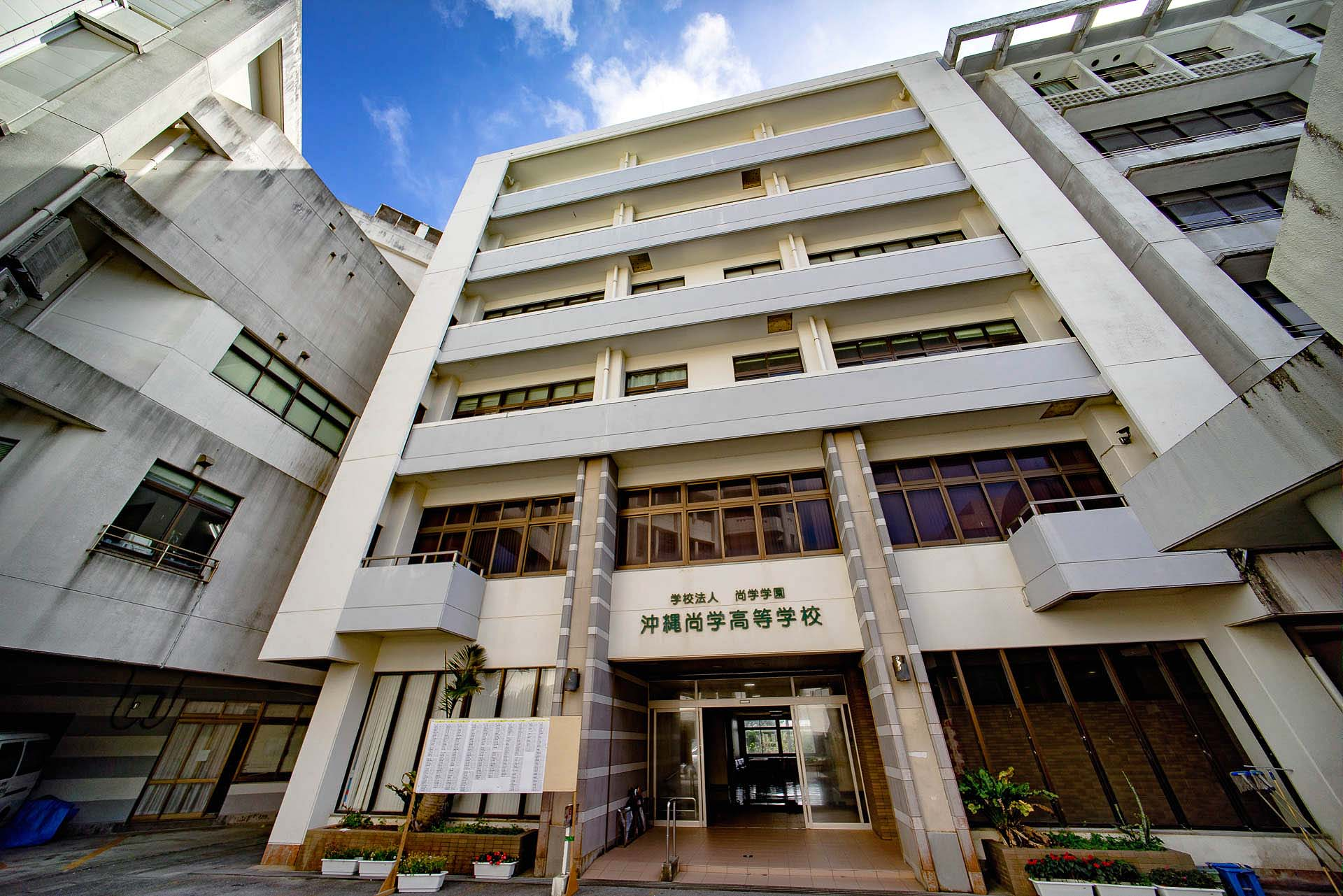
- Naha, Okinawa Prefecture; Japan

Information
- Motto: Japanese: 恐れず、侮らず、気負わず (Without fear, disdain, or over-eagerness)
- Website: www.okisho.ed.jp

Okinawa Shogaku High School (沖縄尚学高等学校・附属中学校, Okinawa Shōgaku Kōtō Gakkō Fuzoku Chūgakkō) is a middle school and high school in the Kokuba district of Naha, Okinawa. Okisho, as it is called, is known for its performance in high school baseball tournaments, including spring tournament wins in 1999, 2008 and Summer in 2025.

Its colors are green, yellow, and maize. The school motto is "恐れず、侮らず、気負わず," which can directly be translated to "Without fear, disdain, or over-eagerness."
