= Hitoki Iwase =

Japanese baseball player (born 1974)

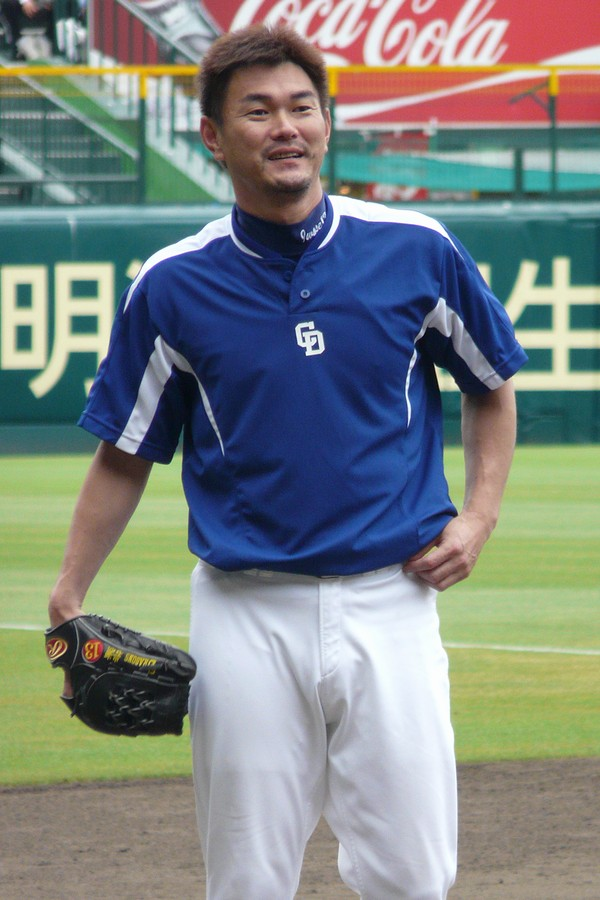
- Iwase with the Chunichi Dragons
- Pitcher
- Born: November 10, 1974 (age 51); Nishio, Aichi, Japan
- Batted: Left Threw: Left

NPB debut
- April 2, 1999, for the Chunichi Dragons

Last NPB appearance
- October 12, 2018, for the Chunichi Dragons

Career statistics
- Win-Loss: 59–51
- Earned run average: 2.31
- Saves: 407
- Strikeouts: 841
- Stats at Baseball Reference

Teams
- Chunichi Dragons (1999–2018)

Career highlights and awards
- NPB All-Time Saves Leader (407 saves); Japan Series champion (2007); 10× NPB All-Star (2000–2001, 2003, 2005–2007, 2010–2013); 5× NPB Saves Leader (2005–2006, 2009, 2010, 2012); 3× Central League Middle Reliever of the Year (1999-2000, 2003); NPB record for saves in a single season with 46 (2005); Combined perfect game with Daisuke Yamai (2007); Comeback Player of the Year (2017)

Member of the Japanese

Baseball Hall of Fame
- Induction: 2025
- Last updated on: January 16, 2025

Olympic medal record

Men's baseball
Bronze medal – third place	Athens 2004	Team competition

Hitoki Iwase (岩瀬 仁紀, born November 10, 1974) is a Japanese former professional baseball pitcher. He played in Nippon Professional Baseball (NPB) from 1999 to 2018 for the Chunichi Dragons. He holds the NPB record for career saves and mound appearances.

In 2005, he marked 46 saves with a 1.88 ERA, renewing the single-season save record previously set by Kazuhiro Sasaki. This was subsequently broken by Dennis Sarfate of the Fukuoka SoftBank Hawks in 2017.

He was chosen to play on the Japanese Olympic baseball team for the 2004 Summer Olympics, and won a bronze medal. In the 2007 Japan Series, he saved a perfect game with eight innings thrown by Daisuke Yamai.

In 2008, he was selected to play on the Japanese Olympic baseball team for the 2008 Summer Olympics. In group stage against South Korean Olympic baseball team, his pitch was hit by Kim Hyunsoo, which resulted in a loss. In the semifinal round against the South Korean team, his pitch was hit by Lee Seung-Yeop, leading to a two-run homerun. This again led to another loss. His overall performance in the 2008 Summer Olympics included three defeats and an ERA of 13.75.

On 16 January 2025, Iwase was inducted into the Japanese Baseball Hall of Fame.
