= American expatriate baseball players in Japan =

American expatriate baseball players in Japan have been a feature of the Japanese professional leagues since 1934. American expatriate players began to steadily find spots on Nippon Professional Baseball (NPB) rosters in the 1960s. More than 600 Americans have played NPB, although very few last more than a single season in Japan.

Many of the most celebrated American expatriate players came to Japan after not finding success in the Major Leagues. Major League Baseball (MLB) players, scouts, and sabermetricians describe play in the NPB as "AAAA"; less competitive than in MLB, but more competitive than in AAA minor league baseball, which may explain the American expatriate players' success overseas. (see: "Big in Japan")

American players hold several NPB records, including highest career batting average (Leron Lee, .334), highest single season batting average (Randy Bass, .389), and the dubious record of most strikeouts in a season by a hitter (Ralph Bryant, 204). Americans rank #3 (Tuffy Rhodes, 55) and #5 (Randy Bass, 54) on the list of most home runs in a season, and #2 in single-season RBI (Bobby Rose, 153).

Since the 1970s, Americans have also made an impact in Nippon Professional Baseball's managing and coaching ranks, with Bobby Valentine and Trey Hillman managing their respective teams to Japan Series championships.

== Gaijin waku and cultural differences ==
For most of its history, NPB regulations imposed "gaijin waku", a limit on the number of non-Japanese people per team to two or three — including the manager and/or coaching staff. Initially each team was allowed three foreign players; in 1963 this was reduced to two. With enough service time, a non-Japanese player like Randy Messenger no longer counts against this limitation (with Messenger achieving that after nine seasons with the Hanshin Tigers).

In addition to the foreign culture, the language barrier, and loneliness, differences in the way the game is played in Japan are often challenges for American players. Japanese teams practice much more often than American teams, the game relies more on off-speed pitching and not as many fastballs, and team harmony is stressed over individual achievements. The American writer Robert Whiting wrote in his 1977 book The Chrysanthemum and the Bat that,

The Japanese view of life, stressing group identity, cooperation, hard work, respect for age, seniority and 'face' has permeated almost every aspect of the sport. Americans who come to play in Japan quickly realize that Baseball Samurai Style is different.

While others have objected to characterizing the sport that way, many Japanese players and managers describe themselves in these terms.

Perhaps because of these cultural differences, many expatriate baseball players don't last very long in NPB. Even star players often return home after five or six seasons. Of American expatriate baseball players in Japan, the longest tenures in NPB belong to Tuffy Rhodes (a total of 13 seasons in NPB), Wally Yonamine (12 seasons), Leron Lee (11 seasons), and Leon Lee, Greg Wells, and Randy Messenger (10 seasons each).

== Recruitment and salaries ==
There was a time when Japanese teams looked to recruit established Major League players on the downside of their careers. Now, however, Japanese teams scout American Triple-A games and monitor MLB transactions, looking for players being shuttled back and forth between the minors and the majors. A good majority of American players recruited to play in NPB are power hitters, which traditionally are in short supply in Japan.

Although the average NPB salary is not comparable to MLB salaries, Japanese teams can offer much more money than a player can make in the American minor leagues. The typical American playing NPB has a higher base salary than his Japanese teammates, but his endorsement opportunities are much more limited. The Yomiuri Giants are particularly known for the high salaries they pay foreign players.

== History ==
=== 1930s and 1940s ===
American Major League Baseball outfielder Lefty O'Doul was instrumental in spreading baseball's popularity in Japan, serving as the sport's "goodwill ambassador" in the mid-1930s, and again after World War II.

Japanese-American outfielder Fumito "Jimmy" Horio (who hailed from Hawaii) became the first American to play professional baseball in Japan when he joined the Dai Nippon Tokyo Yakyu Kurabu (later known as the Tokyo Giants) in December 1934, touring with them in 1935. Dai Nippon was a team of all-stars organized by media mogul Matsutarō Shōriki that matched up against a visiting American All-Star team that included Babe Ruth, Jimmie Foxx, Lou Gehrig, and Charlie Gehringer. Owner Shōriki survived an assassination attempt by right-wing nationalists for allowing foreigners (in this case, Americans) to play baseball in Jingu Stadium. He received a 16-inch-long scar from a broadsword during the assassination attempt.

Harris McGalliard (known in Japan as "Bucky Harris"), Herbert "Buster" North, and James E. "Jimmy Bonna" Bonner became the first Americans to play in Japan's professional baseball league, when the Japanese Baseball League was formed in 1936. Bonner was the first African American to play baseball professionally in Japan, 11 years before Jackie Robinson broke the color barrier in Major League Baseball. "Bucky Harris" was the fall 1937 Japanese Baseball League Most Valuable Player, with a .310 batting average. Harris, North, and Bonner were joined by the Japanese-American players Kiyomi "Slim" Hirakawa, Kazuyoshi "George" Matsuura, Yoshio "Sam" Takahashi, and Tadashi Wakabayashi.

In October 1940, responding to rising hostility toward the West due to World War II, the league outlawed the use of English in Japanese baseball. Pitcher Tadashi Wakabayashi renounced his American citizenship in 1941, following the Japanese attack on Pearl Harbor (so his achievements as the Japanese Baseball League Most Valuable Player in 1944 and 1947 "don't count" toward the accomplishments of American players). No Americans played in Japanese pro leagues from that point until after the war.

=== 1950s ===
Another Hawaiian, Wally Yonamine, was the first American to play professional baseball in Japan after World War II when he joined the Yomiuri Giants of the reorganized Japanese professional league, now known as Nippon Professional Baseball. A multi-skilled outfielder, Yonamine was a member of four Japan Series Championship teams, the Central League Most Valuable Player in 1957, a consecutive seven-time Best Nine Award winner (1952–58), an eleven-time All-Star, and a three-time batting champion. He was inducted into the Japanese Baseball Hall of Fame in 1994, the only American yet admitted into the Hall as a player until Randy Bass was inducted in 2023.

Other than Yonamine, the first Americans to play NPB were African-American veterans of Negro league baseball. The Hankyu Braves made a commitment to attracting these players, the first of whom were third-baseman John Britton and pitcher Jimmy Newberry, who both came to the Braves in 1952. Britton played for the Braves through the 1953 season, while Newberry left after one year. Infielder Larry Raines and pitcher Rufus Gaines joined Britton on the Braves in 1953. Gaines pitched well, recording 14 wins with a 2.53 ERA, but left after one season, while Raines stayed another year, winning the Pacific League batting title in 1954 with a .337 average.

In 1953, while serving in the military, former Boston Braves pitcher Phil Paine pitched in nine games for the Nishitetsu Lions, becoming the first former major leaguer to play in Nippon Professional Baseball. His first appearance occurred on August 23, 1953.

In 1954, the Mainichi Orions signed catcher Charlie Lewis and the Takahashi Unions signed catcher Sal Recca. Both men stayed in Japan for two seasons, with Lewis being a Best Nine Award-winner both years, and Recca slugging 33 home runs during his two NPB seasons.

Outfielder/first-baseman Jack Ladra joined the Toei Flyers in 1958. He became the first American (other than Yonamine) who seemed to really find a home in Japan, staying with the team until 1964.

The Kintetsu Buffalo signed former pitcher Glenn Mickens and catcher Ron Bottler for the 1959 season. Mickens played for five years in Japan, compiling a record of 45–53 with a 2.54 ERA. Bottler played for the Buffalo for three seasons, gradually converting from catcher to starting pitcher, where he had more success.

=== 1960s ===
In 1962, the Chunichi Dragons signed former Major League stars Don Newcombe and Larry Doby. Newcombe had been a pitcher in the Major Leagues, but played for the Dragons almost exclusively as an outfielder/first-baseman, hitting .262 with 12 home runs and 43 RBI; while Doby compiled modest numbers of a .225 batting average, 10 home runs, and 35 RBI. Newcombe and Doby each only played one NPB season before returning home to the U.S.

In 1964, Nankai Hawks ace Joe Stanka won 26 games to receive the Pacific League MVP award — the first American to win such an award. He pitched shutouts in Games 1, 6, and 7 of the 1964 Japan Series to win the Japan Series MVP award as well. That same year, fellow American pitcher Gene Bacque of the Hanshin Tigers compiled a 29–9 record with a 1.89 ERA, becoming the first non-Japanese player to receive the Eiji Sawamura Award. Bacque won Game 2 of the Japan Series that year, but lost Game 6 to Stanka 1–0.

Former Chicago Cubs major league ballplayer George Altman played professional baseball in Japan from 1968 through 1975, for the Lotte Orions and the Hanshin Tigers, where he had a .309 batting average with 205 home runs.

=== 1970s ===
In 1971 former Los Angeles Dodgers player Johnny Werhas played for the Taiyo Whales. In the first trade between a Japanese team and an American team, he was dealt to the San Diego Padres' Pacific Coast League affiliate, the Hawaii Islanders, for longtime Major League infielder Clete Boyer. Boyer played professionally in Japan for the Taiyō Whales from 1972 to 1975. His roommate was Sadaharu Oh. After retiring in 1975, Boyer became the defensive coach for the Taiyō Whales in 1976.

In 1972 the Hiroshima Toyo Carp became the last team to hire their first non-Japanese player (excluding Japanese-Americans), when former American League MVP Zoilo Versalles joined the team.

Former league star Wally Yonamine became the first foreigner to be a manager in the NPB, when he took charge of the Chunichi Dragons from 1972 to 1977.

After a long successful Major League career, Joe Pepitone made an impression in a negative way. In 1973 he accepted an offer of $70,000 ($507,684 today) a year to play for the Yakult Atoms. While in Japan, he hit .163 with one home run and two RBIs in 14 games played. Pepitone spent his days in Japan skipping games for claimed injuries only to be at night in discos, behavior which led the Japanese to adopt his name into their vernacular—as a word meaning "goof off."

In 1974, the 6 feet 7 inches (2.01 m) MLB home run slugger Frank Howard joined the Taiheiyo Club Lions at age 37. In his first regular season at bat he hurt his back on a swing, and never played again, eventually retiring.

In 1974, Clarence Jones of the Osaka Kintetsu Buffaloes hit 38 home runs, becoming the first foreign player to win a home run title in Nippon Professional Baseball. He led the Pacific League again with 36 home runs in 1976.

In 1975, Joe Lutz became the first Caucasian to manage a team in Japanese professional baseball. After being hired by the Hiroshima Carp in 1974 as a batting instructor, the following season, Lutz was selected to manage the Carp. Hall of Fame pitcher Warren Spahn was hired to serve as the team's temporary pitching coach, after having worked together with Lutz on the Cleveland Indians' coaching staff. As manager, Lutz had the team change the colors of its caps to red to represent the team's fighting spirit. Unfortunately, Lutz only lasted as Carp manager for 15 games, leaving the team due to an umpiring dispute (although the Carp went on to win its first-ever Central League championship under replacement manager Takeshi Koba).

Famed manager Leo Durocher was hired as manager of the Taiheiyo Club Lions in 1976, but he retired due to illness (hepatitis) before the beginning of the season.

Willie Davis 2 time Allstar with 17 seasons in MLB signed with the Chunichi Dragons after the 1976 MLB season and became one of the most famous American players to ever come to Japan. Willie a 3 time Gold Glove winner for the Dodgers in 1971-72-73 for his Centerfield Defense had 2547 hits upon arrival in the Land of the Rising Sun. In 1977 he won the Pacific League player of the month for June but got hurt in early July and with less than 300 ABs he hit 25 HR's and batted over .300 for 1977. He also had a fine 1978 with the Crown Lighter Lions before coming back to the Majors to finish his career with the Angels in 1979. Davis over 2 seasons in Japan hit 43 HR's and batted .300.

Leron Lee played for the Lotte Orions from 1977 to 1987. He led the league in home runs and runs batted in his first season, and won the batting title in 1980. In 1978, he invited younger brother Leon Lee to play in Japan, and the brothers formed a feared power-hitting duo for the Orions. The African American sidekick role in the 1992 film Mr. Baseball (played by actor Dennis Haysbert) is believed to be based on the experiences of several African American players in Japan, including the Lee brothers.

In 1979 Charlie Manuel led the Kintetsu Buffaloes to their first pennant win, hitting .324 with 37 home runs and 94 RBI, winning the home run title and the Pacific League Most Valuable Player award — the first American to receive the league MVP honor since 1964. Wildly popular for his tenacious style of play and his power-hitting abilities, Manuel was dubbed "Aka-Oni" (The Red Devil) by fans and teammates.

=== 1980s ===
1984 was a turning point for foreign players in NPB. Three American players — Jim Tracy, Don Money, and Richard Duran — all quit their teams in the early part of the 1984 season and went back to the United States — leaving their respective teams in the lurch. The NPB commissioner at the time, Takezo Shimoda, called the American players "spoiled," and proposed banning non-Japanese players from the NPB. A number of other American players enjoyed stellar 1984 campaigns, however, and the threat never was carried out. For instance, Hankyu Braves first-basemen Greg "Boomer" Wells hit .355 in 1984, with 37 home runs and 130 runs batted in, winning the NPB Triple Crown and the Most Valuable Player award. He was the first non-Japanese winner of the Triple Crown.

In 1984, at 30 years old, Warren Cromartie became the first, and perhaps the most prominent, American player still in his prime to sign with a Japanese baseball team when he joined the Yomiuri Giants before the 1984 NPB season. In 1989, Cromartie batted .378 with 15 home runs and 78 RBIs to be named MVP of the Central League, and lead his team to the Japan Series championship. In the deciding game of the series with the Kintetsu Buffaloes, Cromartie doubled in the fourth inning to ignite a three-run rally and homered in the seventh.

First-basemen Randy Bass is often credited for single-handedly turning around the fortunes of the Hanshin Tigers, which resulted in the team's run and eventual victory of the Japan Series in 1985. Winning the 1985 Most Valuable Player award, he also won four consecutive league batting titles; in 1986, he nearly became the first player in Japan to bat .400, finishing the season with a .389 average, a record that still stands. Bass won consecutive batting Triple Crowns (1985 and 1986). In 1985, he was on a pace to break Sadaharu Oh's record of 55 home runs in a single season, but fell short by one, because in the last game of the season the pitcher from Oh's Yomiuri Giants threw only intentional walks (allegedly to prevent the Westerner from breaking Oh's record). In Japan, his spectacular performance is a legend, and among Tigers fans he is nearly deified, being jokingly referred in conjunction with God and Buddha, "Kami-sama (God), Hotoke-sama (Buddha), Baasu-sama (Bass)" (sama is an honorary variation of "san", similar to "Sir" or "His holiness").

Kintetsu Buffaloes outfielder Ralph Bryant was one of the best left-handed power hitters in Japanese baseball history. In 1989, Bryant hit 49 home runs to lead the Buffaloes to their third Pacific League championship. He won the season MVP award that year, and also tied Sadaharu Oh's career record for hitting three home runs in a game five times. He also struck out countless times, and holds the top four spots on the single-season strikeout records in Nippon Professional Baseball.

=== 1990s ===
Following a brief Major League career, outfielder Alonzo Powell played for seven seasons in Japan. He was just the third player in Central League history, and the first foreign player, to win three straight batting titles, hitting .324, .355, and .340 from 1994 to 1996. He was also a two-time Central League All-Star.

In 1995, Tokyo Swallows third-baseman Tom O'Malley hit .307 with 31 home runs and 87 RBIs. The Swallows won the Japan Series that year, and O'Malley was awarded both the season MVP award and the Japan Series MVP award. He hit .300 for six seasons in a row, a record among non-Japanese players in the Japanese professional leagues.

Yokohama BayStars second-basemen Bobby Rose is remembered as one of the best foreign players in Japanese baseball. Rose hit over .300 for seven of his eight seasons in Japan. He also hit three cycles during his career, the most in Japanese baseball history. Rose had his best season in 1999, hitting 37 home runs with 153 RBIs and a .369 batting average. This remains the highest batting average in Japanese baseball among right-handed hitters, and his 153 RBIs ranks second-most in Japanese baseball history. He also led the league with 192 hits, which was a Central League season record. He led the league in hits for the second straight season in 2000, and had the second highest batting average in the Central League.

=== 2000s ===
Tuffy Rhodes played thirteen years in NPB; he is the all-time home run leader for foreign-born players — and tied for 11th overall — with 474 homers in Japan. In the 2001 season, he hit his 55th homer to tie Sadaharu Oh's Japanese League single season home run record, set in 1964. For the rest of the season, opposing pitchers intentionally walked Rhodes to prevent him from breaking Oh's record. (The following year, Alex Cabrera tied the record.) Rhodes' long career in NPB earned him free agency, in which he was treated as a "Japanese Player" and not bound to the restrictions of foreign players. Only three other non-Japanese players (Tai-Yuan Kuo, Alex Ramírez, and Alex Cabrera) have achieved such a classification in NPB history.

In April 2003, former NPB hitting star Leron Lee was promoted to manager, becoming the first African-American manager in Japanese baseball history. On May 17, 2003, the BlueWave faced the Nippon Ham Fighters, managed by Trey Hillman, for a battle between two American managers in Japan for the first time in 28 years (when Wally Yonamine's Chunichi Dragons faced Joe Lutz' Hiroshima Carp).

In 2005, Yomiuri Giants closer Marc Kroon set the record for the fastest pitch ever in Japanese baseball, at 161 km/h (100 mph). In 2008, he broke his own record of pitching to 162 km/h (101 mph).

In 2005, Chiba Lotte manager Bobby Valentine led the Marines to their first Pacific League pennant in 31 years after emerging victorious in a close playoff with the Fukuoka SoftBank Hawks. The Marines won the Japan Series in a four-game sweep of the Hanshin Tigers. Following their Japan Series championship, the Marines won the inaugural Asia Series by defeating the Samsung Lions of the Korea Baseball Organization in November 2005. For his efforts, Valentine was awarded the Golden Spirit Award and the Matsutaro Shoriki Award — both firsts for a non-Japanese individual.

Trey Hillman's Hokkaido Nippon Ham Fighters won the Pacific League championship in 2006, and returned to defend their title in 2007. It was the first pennant for the franchise in 25 years when they won the championship in 2006, and the repeated success in 2007 was accomplished despite the loss of key players such as Michihiro Ogasawara and Hideki Okajima. His team won the Japan Series and Asia Series in 2006. The team set a franchise-record 14-game winning streak during the 2007 season. Following the example of Chiba Lotte Marines manager Bobby Valentine, Hillman showed his appreciation towards fans by speaking in broken Japanese sentences. After the game in which the Fighters won the pennant in 2006, he shouted "Shinjirarenai!", the Japanese phrase stands for "Unbelievable", to the fans gathered in Sapporo Dome. He repeated the phrase after winning the Nippon Series, and repeated it again after winning the Asia Championship. Like the Boston Red Sox's "The Impossible Dream", Hillman's "Shinjirarenai" became the most popular term describing the Fighters' success in 2006. On October 19, 2007, Hillman signed a multi-year contract to manage the Kansas City Royals. He was the first Major League Baseball manager to be hired based on his Japanese baseball record.

=== 2010s ===
In 2010, with 214 hits, outfielder Matt Murton of the Hanshin Tigers broke the NPB single-season hit record, and became only the fourth player in Nippon Professional Baseball history to have a 200-hit season.

In 2015, relief pitcher Dennis Sarfate recorded 43 saves, a new record for most single-season saves in the Pacific League. On April 2, 2017, Sarfate recorded his 178th save in Japan, setting a new record for most saves by a foreign pitcher in Nippon Professional Baseball history. On July 4, 2017, Sarfate recorded his 200th save, becoming the sixth pitcher in NPB history to reach that threshold and the first foreign pitcher. On September 5, 2017, Sarfate earned his 47th save of the season, breaking the record for most single-season saves in Japanese baseball history. He finished the season with 54 saves. Sarfate earned two saves and a win in the 2017 Japan Series, and won the Japan Series Most Valuable Player Award.

== Notable American players in Nippon Professional Baseball ==
- George Altman (7 seasons, 1968–1974) — compiled career NPB records of 205 home runs and 656 RBI, along with a .309 batting average and a .561 slugging percentage.
- Gene Bacque (8 seasons, 1962–1969) — retired from NPB with 100 wins, a 2.34 ERA, and 826 career strikeouts.
- Randy Bass (6 seasons, 1983–1988) — a marginal Major League player for six seasons, Bass took advantage of the differences between Japanese and American styles of pitching, and immediately became the Hanshin Tigers' star slugger. Finished his NPB career with a .337 batting average, a .660 slugging percentage, 202 home runs, and 486 RBI.
- Jack Bloomfield (7 seasons, 1960–1966) — career NPB batting average of .315, with a .372 on-base percentage.
- Ralph Bryant (8 seasons, 1988–1995) — retired from NPB with 259 career home runs and 641 RBI.
- Warren Cromartie (7 seasons, 1984–1990) — upon his arrival in Japan, Cromartie's manager, legendary Japanese slugger Sadaharu Oh, noticed a hitch in Cromartie's swing. He had Cromartie take batting practice with a book under his elbow to correct it. The trick must have worked, as he had ten game-winning RBIs in his first season, and belted over thirty home runs in each of his first three seasons. He originally intended to retire at the end of the 1989 season, but his success prompted him to spend one more season with the Giants.
- Orestes Destrade (5 seasons, 1989–1992, 1995) — played five seasons for the Seibu Lions, where he led the league in home runs three consecutive years.
- Cecil Fielder (1 season, 1989) — played one season for the Hanshin Tigers, where he hit .302/.403/.628 with 38 HRs and 81 RBIs.
- Adam Jones (2 seasons, 2020–2021) — played two seasons for the Orix Buffaloes, where he hit .250/.334/.390 with 16 HRs and 66 RBIs.
- Marc Kroon (6 seasons, 2005–2010) — former all-time leading foreigner in career saves with 177; All-Star led the Central League in saves in 2008 with 41, and won a championship in 2009 with the Yomiuri Giants.
- Leon Lee (10 seasons, 1978–1987) — best season came in 1980, when he hit .340, with 41 home runs and 116 RBIs. Career NPB totals include a .308 batting average, a .530 slugging percentage, 268 home runs, and 884 RBI.
- Leron Lee (11 seasons, 1977–1987) — at .334, holds the Japanese record for career batting average. Career NPB totals include a .320 batting average, a .542 slugging percentage, 283 home runs, and 912 RBI.
- Jim Lyttle (7 seasons, 1977–1983) — the MVP of the 1980 Japan Series, he compiled NPB totals of 166 home runs and 529 RBI.
- Gene Martin (6 seasons, 1974–1979) — career NPB totals include 189 home runs (averaging over 30 per season) and 498 RBI.
- Charlie Manuel (6 seasons, 1976–1981) — career NPB totals include a .303 batting average, a .604 slugging percentage, 189 home runs, and 491 RBI.
- Miles Mikolas (3 seasons, 2015–2017) - former Padre and Ranger starting pitcher had a breakout career with the NPB, pitching 33–13 with a 2.18 ERA with the Yomiuri Giants. Would be signed back to the MLB by the St. Louis Cardinals in December 2017, entering their starting rotation and performed among the top pitchers in the National League.
- Matt Moore (1 season, 2020) —played one season with the Fukuoka SoftBank Hawks, where he went 6–3 with a 2.65 ERA and 1.10 WHIP in 78 IP.
- Tom O'Malley (6 seasons, 1991–1996) — as a member of the Hanshin Tigers, he won the Central League golden glove award in 1992, and led the league in on-base-percentage from 1992 to 1995, averaging 20 HRs and a batting average over .300 each season. He introduced Jim Paciorek to the Tigers in 1992, and managed to put the struggling Tigers in second place that year. O'Malley won the batting title in 1993, but left the Tigers in 1994 after having issues with manager Katsuhiro Nakamura. He was quickly picked up by the Yakult Swallows in 1995, and played his best season that year, winning both the season MVP award and the Japan Series MVP award.
- Steve Ontiveros (6 seasons, 1980–1985) — played for the Seibu Lions, compiling a .312 lifetime batting average and a .394 on-base percentage.
- Rodney Pedraza (5 seasons, 1999–2003) — saved 117 games for the Fukuoka Daiei Hawks.
- Jim Paciorek (6 seasons, 1988–1993) — Paciorek had actually traveled to Japan during his college years to play in the Japanese college baseball league. After spending several years in the minors, Paciorek played in 48 games for the Milwaukee Brewers in 1987, but then chose to sign with the Yokohama Taiyo Whales in 1988. He ranked second in the league with a .332 average, and won the outfield Best Nine Award that year. He remained one of the league's best hitters, and won the Central League batting title in 1990. Paciorek ended the season with a batting average over .300 for the fourth straight year in 1991, but was cut from the team for hitting only 11 home runs. The Whales had made a bad decision in cutting Paciorek, as he had his best season in 1992 playing with the Hanshin Tigers. Paciorek had joined the Tigers at the suggestion of Tom O'Malley, and he led the league in hits to win a Best Nine Award at first base. He also won the Central League golden glove award. In six NPB seasons, Paciorek had a .315 career batting average.
- Alonzo Powell (7 seasons, 1992–1998) — the first foreign player to win three straight batting titles, hitting .324, .355, and .340 from 1994 to 1996. He was also a 2-time Central League All-Star, and finished his NPB career with a lifetime .313 batting average.
- Roger Repoz (5 seasons, 1973–1977) — Former Yankees, A's and Angels outfielder was a top slugger for Yakult, hitting 110 homers in four years with the club. He was selected as Best Nine in 1975.
- Tuffy Rhodes (13 seasons, 1996–2005, 2007–2009) — granted free agency by the Boston Red Sox after the 1995 season, Rhodes signed with the Kintetsu Buffaloes in the Pacific League. He hit 288 home runs in eight seasons with the Buffaloes. After two years with the Yomiuri Giants (for whom he hit 72 homers), in 2006 he tried to return to the major leagues with the Cincinnati Reds but was released by the team in spring training. He returned to Japan in 2007, signing a one-year contract with the Orix Buffaloes. Rhodes' comeback was a spectacular one, batting .291 and hitting 42 home runs to go with 96 runs batted in. The next season, teamed up with fellow gaijin slugger Alex Cabrera, Rhodes hit 40 home runs and drove in 118 runs. Combined, Cabrera and Rhodes, who earned the nickname "Caburo" late in the season, slammed 76 home runs and drove in 222 runs. Rhodes' 118 RBI also led the league as the Buffaloes made an improbable run to the playoffs, finishing second in the Pacific League and making their first playoff appearance since their 1996 Japan Series victory. Rhodes finished his NPB career with 464 home runs, a record total for a foreign-born player.
- Dave Roberts (7 seasons, 1967–1973) — career NPB totals of 183 home runs and 492 RBI, along with a .524 slugging percentage.
- Tony Roig (6 seasons, 1963–1968) — shortstop met the long-ball expectations for American ballplayers by hitting 126 home in six seasons with the Nishitetsu Lions and Kintetsu Buffaloes of the Pacific League.
- Bobby Rose (9 seasons, 1992–2000) — after playing only 73 Major League games, the second baseman signed with the Yokohama BayStars in 1992. He led the Central League in RBIs and doubles in his first year (1993), and played in all 130 regular season games from 1993 to 1995. Rose continued his success, showing incredible clutch hitting skills, and greatly contributed to his team's championship in 1998. He won the Central League golden glove award in 1998 at second base. After leading the league in hits for the second straight season in 2000, Rose suddenly announced his retirement in the off-season. The main reasons for his abrupt departure seem to be that his family wanted to return to the United States, and the BayStars also lacked the financial backing needed to renew his massive contract.
- Dennis Sarfate (8 seasons, 2011–2021) — relief pitcher who set several NPB records, including most single-season saves and most saves by a foreign pitcher.
- John Sipin (9 seasons, 1972–1980) — second baseman made five All-Star teams, gaining incredible popularity in Japan, with his huge mat of hair and beard inspiring the nickname "Lion-Maru" (after the character in the children's television series Kaiketsu Lion-Maru). Sipin was highly entertaining on and off the field, making entrances with extravagant outfits, or fielding ground balls with his batting helmet on.
- Daryl Spencer (7 seasons, 1964–1968, 1971–1972) — career NPB totals include 152 home runs and a .536 slugging percentage.
- Joe Stanka (7 seasons, 1960–1966) — retired from NPB with 100 career victories, a 3.03 ERA, and 887 strikeouts.
- Greg "Boomer" Wells (10 seasons, 1983–1992) — over 10 NPB seasons he compiled a .317 batting average and a .555 slugging percentage, with 277 home runs and 901 RBI.
- Terry Whitfield (3 seasons, 1981–1983) — excelled for the Seibu Lions, putting up high offensive numbers. In 1981, he batted .316 with 22 home runs and 100 runs batted in. That season he won a Best Nine Award. In 1982, he batted .272 with 25 home runs and 71 runs batted in. And in 1983, he batted .278 with 38 home runs and 109 runs batted in. That year Whitfield was named a Pacific League All-Star and won another Best Nine Award, the second time in three years.
- Matt Winters (5 seasons, 1990–1994) — outfielder signed with the Nippon Ham Fighters and quickly emerged as the team's best power hitter, hitting over 30 home runs each of his first four seasons in Japan. He recorded the second-most home runs in the league for three consecutive years, behind Cuban slugger Orestes Destrade. He also attracted attention from fans for his avid personality; he frequently participated in between-inning dance performances, and performed magic tricks whenever a game was stopped due to rain. His antics and clutch-hitting made him one of the most popular players in the league. Winters later worked as a scout and coach in the minor leagues before becoming a scout for the Nippon Ham Fighters. Winters' career NPB stats include 160 home runs, 428 RBI, and a .525 slugging percentage.
- Tyrone Woods (6 seasons, 2003–2008) — in six seasons, the first baseman compiled 240 home runs and 616 RBI. Earlier in his career he played for the Doosan Bears of Korea's KBO League, and in 2003 Woods became the first man to lead a league in homers in both Korea and Japan.
- Wally Yonamine (12 seasons, 1951–1962) — played for the Yomiuri Giants and the Chunichi Dragons. A multi-skilled outfielder, Yonamine was noted for his flexible batting style and aggressive baserunning. Later became a successful manager of the Chunichi Dragons (1972–1977).

== Notable American managers and coaches ==
- Don Blasingame — after retiring from the Nankai Hawks after three seasons in 1970, "Don Blazer" joined the team's coaching staff for the next eight seasons. In 1978, he became the third American (after Wally Yonamine and Joe Lutz) to manage in NPB when he took over the Hiroshima Toyo Carp. He then managed the Hanshin Tigers for one-and-a-half seasons before returning to the Nankai Hawks from 1981 to 1982. As manager for the two teams, he compiled a record of 180-208-28 (ties are played in Japanese baseball). Blazer was associated with NPB for 15 seasons.
- Marty Brown — played for the Hiroshima Toyo Carp from 1992 to 1994, then was brought back to manage the Carp from 2006 to 2009; managed the Tohoku Rakuten Golden Eagles in 2010.
- Terry Collins — managed the Orix Buffaloes in 2007–2008.
- Leron Lee returned to Japan to serve as the Orix BlueWave's hitting coach for the 2003 NPB season and was hired as manager later that season. Lasted one season as BlueWave manager.
- Tom O'Malley — returned to Japan during the Hanshin Tigers 2002 spring training camp, and served as a batting coach throughout the season. He was also a mentor for non-Japanese players, including George Arias, Jeff Williams, Trey Moore, and Jerrod Riggan, who contributed to the Tigers' championship in 2003. O'Malley resigned from his coaching job after Senichi Hoshino resigned from his managerial position. He scouted players in the major and minor leagues for the Hanshin Tigers until 2009, and traveled to Japan during spring training to offer advice to non-Japanese players. He has appeared in various television commercials in the local Kansai region (Hanshin Electric Railway Co., Ltd.), and posters featuring O'Malley could be found in Koshien Stadium.
- Bobby Valentine — in 1995, the former Texas Rangers manager took over as manager of the Chiba Lotte Marines. That season, the team surprised most Japanese baseball fans by finishing in second place (69–58–3), a remarkable feat for a team that had (at that time) not won the Japanese Pacific league pennant since 1974. However, Valentine's first tenure ended when he was fired abruptly after a single season due to the personal conflict with general manager Tatsuro Hirooka, despite having a two-year contract. In 2004, Valentine began his second stint as manager of the Chiba Lotte Marines. In 2005, he led the Marines to their first Pacific League pennant in 31 years and a four-game sweep of the Hanshin Tigers in the Japan Series. In 2008, Valentine was the subject of the ESPN Films documentary The Zen of Bobby V. The film followed Valentine and his 2007 Chiba Lotte Marines team. The Zen of Bobby V. was an official selection at the 2008 Tribeca Film Festival. The Marines decided to let Valentine go after the 2009 season after an extensive smear campaign led by club president Ryuzo Setoyama, which ironically backfired and resulted in an overflow of support for Valentine by local fans. In the end, Valentine was fired, even though a petition to extend his contract was presented to the organization with 112,000 signatures.

== Awards ==
=== Nippon Professional Baseball Most Valuable Player Award ===
- 1937 (JBL fall) — Bucky Harris, Korakuen Eagles, .310 batting average, 62 hits, 17 doubles
- 1957 (Central League)— Wally Yonamine, Yomiuri Giants, .343 batting average, 160 hits, 48 RBI
- 1964 (Pacific League) — Joe Stanka, Nankai Hawks, 26–7 won-loss record, 2.40 ERA
- 1979 (Pacific League) — Charlie Manuel, Kintetsu Buffaloes, .324 batting average, 37 home runs, 94 RBI
- 1984 (Pacific League) — Greg Wells, Hankyu Braves, .355, 37 home runs, 130 RBI
- 1985 (Central League) — Randy Bass, Hanshin Tigers, .350 batting average, 54 home runs, 134 RBI
- 1989 (Central League) —Warren Cromartie, Yomiuri Giants, .378 batting average, 166 hits, 33 doubles
- 1989 (Pacific League) — Ralph Bryant, Kintetsu Buffaloes, .283 batting average, 49 home runs, 121 RBI
- 1992 (Central League) — Jack Howell, Yakult Swallows, .331 batting average, 38 home runs, 87 RBI
- 1995 (Central League) — Tom O'Malley, Yakult Swallows, .302 batting average, 31 home runs, 96 walks
- 2001 (Pacific League) — Tuffy Rhodes, Osaka Kintetsu Buffaloes, .327 batting average, 55 home runs, 131 RBI
- 2017 (Pacific League) — Dennis Sarfate, Fukuoka SoftBank Hawks

=== Japan Series Most Valuable Player ===
- 1964 — Joe Stanka, Nankai Hawks
- 1980 — Jim Lyttle, Hiroshima Toyo Carp
- 1985 — Randy Bass, Hanshin Tigers
- 1990 — Orestes Destrade, Seibu Lions
- 1995 — Tom O'Malley, Yakult Swallows
- 1996 — Troy Neel, Orix BlueWave
- 2016 — Brandon Laird, Hokkaido Nippon-Ham Fighters
- 2017 — Dennis Sarfate, Fukuoka SoftBank Hawks

=== Eiji Sawamura Award ===
- 1964 — Gene Bacque, Hanshin Tigers
- 2016 — Kris Johnson, Hiroshima Carp

=== Golden Spirit Award ===
- 2005 — Bobby Valentine, Chiba Lotte Marines

=== Matsutaro Shoriki Award ===
- 2005 — Bobby Valentine, Chiba Lotte Marines
- 2017 — Dennis Sarfate, Fukuoka SoftBank Hawks

== See also ==
- Big in Japan (phrase)
- Mr. Baseball
