= List of Yomiuri Giants managers =

The Yomiuri Giants are a professional baseball team based in Bunkyo, Tokyo, Japan. The Giants are members of the Central League (CL) in Nippon Professional Baseball (NPB). In baseball, the head coach of a team is called the manager, or more formally, the field manager. The duties of the team manager include team strategy and leadership on and off the field. The team has employed twelve different managers since the formation of a professional baseball league in Japan. The current Giants manager is Tatsunori Hara.

In 1934, an All-Japan team was formed to play sixteen games against a Major League Baseball All-Star team in Japan. After seeing the enthusiastic fan response to these games, Yomiuri Shimbun-owner Matsutarō Shōriki decided to keep much of the Japanese team intact to form the Great Japan Tokyo Baseball Club in December of that same year. This team spent much of the next year in the United States playing various Minor League and amateur teams. During this time, the team's managers were Japanese Baseball Hall of Famer Daisuke Miyake and Yoshio Asanuma. Encouraged by the success of Shōriki's team, which had quickly changed their name to the Giants, other Japanese teams were formed and Japanese Baseball League, Japan's first professional baseball league, was established in 1936.

The Giants dominated the Japanese Baseball League. The team won nine championships in sixteen seasons under five different managers. Sadayoshi Fujimoto, the team's first manager, held the position for ten seasons and has the highest winning percentage of any Giants manager. Hideo Fujimoto was a player-manager from 1944 to mid-1946, however the 1945 season was cancelled because of World War II.

Since the NPB was formed in 1950, the Giants have had eight different managers. Starting with the NPB's inaugural season, Shigeru Mizuhara managed the team for eleven seasons, earning the team its first four Japan Series titles. Mizuhara's total winning percentage was .638, the highest of any manager in the NPB-era. Following Mizuhara, Tetsuharu Kawakami began a 14-year managerial tenure in 1960, the longest in franchise history. Under Kawakami, the team won eleven more Japan Series titles, including nine consecutive titles from 1965 to 1973. Kawakami won 1,066 games as the Giants' manager, the most in franchise history.

== Table key ==
| # | A running total of the number of Giants managers. Any manager who has two or more separate terms is only counted once. |
| GM | Number of regular season games managed; may not equal sum of wins and losses due to tie games |
| W | Number of regular season wins in games managed |
| L | Number of regular season losses in games managed |
| T | Number of regular season ties in games managed |
| Win% | Winning percentage: number of wins divided by number of games managed that did not result in a tie |
| PA | Postseason appearances: number of years this manager has led the franchise to the postseason |
| PW | Postseason wins: number of wins this manager has accrued in the postseason^{A} |
| PL | Postseason losses: number of losses this manager has accrued in the postseason^{B} |
| PT | Postseason ties: number of ties this manager has accrued in the postseason |
| LC | League Championships: number of League Championships, or pennants, achieved by the manager^{C} |
| JS | Japan Series: number of Japan Series won by the manager |
| † | Elected to the Japanese Baseball Hall of Fame |

- ^A This does not include the one-win advantage that league champions are automatically awarded in the second stage of the Climax Series.
- ^B This does not include the one-loss disadvantage first stage winners are automatically given in the second stage of the Climax Series.
- ^C After the Climax Series was created in 2007, the team with the best record during the regular season was still named the league champion, not the winner of the Climax Series.

== Managers ==
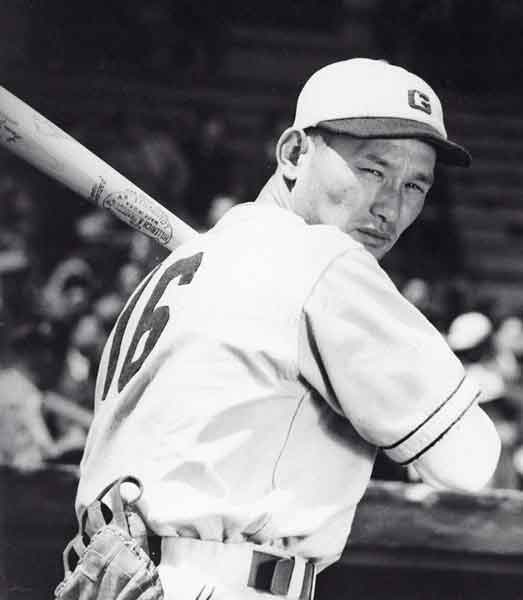
Tetsuharu Kawakami is the longest-tenured Giants' manager, having managed for 14 straight seasons.

Statistics current through the 2022 season

| # | Image | Manager | Seasons | GM | W | L | T | Win% | PA | PW | PL | PT | LC | JS | Ref |
|---|---|---|---|---|---|---|---|---|---|---|---|---|---|---|---|
| 1 | | Sadayoshi Fujimoto^{†} | 1936–1942 | 604 | 422 | 168 | 14 | .715 | — | — | — | — | — | — | |
| 2 | | Haruyasu Nakajima^{†} | 1943 | 84 | 54 | 27 | 3 | .667 | — | — | — | — | — | — | |
| 3 | | Hideo Fujimoto^{†} | 1944–1946 | 60 | 34 | 23 | 3 | .596 | — | — | — | — | — | — | |
| — | | Haruyasu Nakajima^{†} | 1946–1947 | 171 | 96 | 74 | 1 | .565 | — | — | — | — | — | — | |
| 4 | | Osamu Mihara^{†} | 1947–1949 | 302 | 177 | 118 | 7 | .600 | — | — | — | — | — | — | |
| 5 | | Shigeru Mizuhara^{†} | 1950–1960 | 1,409 | 881 | 499 | 29 | .638 | 8 | 22 | 24 | 2 | 8 | 4 | |
| 6 | | Tetsuharu Kawakami^{†} | 1961–1974 | 1,866 | 1,066 | 739 | 61 | .591 | 11 | 44 | 18 | 0 | 11 | 11 | |
| 7 | | Shigeo Nagashima^{†} | 1975–1980 | 780 | 387 | 338 | 55 | .534 | 2 | 4 | 8 | 0 | 2 | 0 | |
| 8 | | Motoshi Fujita^{†} | 1981–1983 | 390 | 211 | 148 | 31 | .588 | 2 | 7 | 6 | 0 | 2 | 1 | |
| 9 | | Sadaharu Oh^{†} | 1984–1988 | 650 | 347 | 264 | 39 | .568 | 1 | 2 | 4 | 0 | 1 | 0 | |
| — | | Motoshi Fujita^{†} | 1989–1992 | 520 | 305 | 213 | 2 | .589 | 2 | 4 | 7 | 0 | 2 | 1 | |
| — | | Shigeo Nagashima^{†} | 1993–2001 | 1,202 | 647 | 551 | 4 | .540 | 3 | 9 | 8 | 0 | 3 | 2 | |
| 10 | | Tatsunori Hara | 2002–2003 | 280 | 157 | 118 | 5 | .571 | 1 | 4 | 0 | 0 | 1 | 1 | |
| 11 | | Tsuneo Horiuchi^{†} | 2004–2005 | 284 | 133 | 144 | 7 | .480 | — | — | — | — | — | — | |
| — | | Tatsunori Hara | 2006–2015 | 1441 | 795 | 595 | 51 | .572 | 9 | 32 | 33 | 1 | 6 | 2 | |
| 12 | | Yoshinobu Takahashi | 2016–2018 | 429 | 210 | 208 | 11 | .502 | 2 | 1 | 2 | 0 | 0 | 0 | |
| — | | Tatsunori Hara | 2019–2023 | 549 | 273 | 243 | 33 | .529 | 0 | 0 | 0 | 0 | 0 | 0 | |
| 13 | | Shinnosuke Abe | 2024– | 143 | 77 | 59 | 7 | .566 | 0 | 0 | 0 | 0 | 0 | 0 | |
