= Herb North =

American baseball player

- Pitcher
- Born: January 2, 1908; Honolulu, Territory of Hawaii
- Died: April 6, 1964 (aged 56); Kaneohe, Hawaii, US
- Batted: Right Threw: Right

JBL debut
- April 29, 1936, for the Nagoya Golden Dolphins

Last JBL appearance
- 1936

JBL statistics
- Win–loss: 2–5
- Earned run average: 6.48
- Strikeouts: 26

Teams
- Nagoya Golden Dolphins (1936)

Herbert Kuulei North (January 2, 1908 – April 6, 1964), (Note: NPB records erroneously list his birthdate as January 12, 1910) nicknamed Buster, was an American baseball pitcher who played with the Nagoya Golden Dolphins in the Japanese Baseball League's inaugural 1936 season. He earned the first win in Japanese professional baseball history, an 8–5 opening day victory against the Dai Tokyo on April 29, 1936. North was referred to as one of the "Three Musketeers" of Nagoya, along with fellow imports Harris McGalliard and Sam Takahashi; the three were collectively the first Americans to play professional baseball in Japan.

North returned to Hawaii after the season and played in the amateur circuit. He was part of the Hawaii national baseball team at the 1940 Amateur World Series. He later worked as a furniture salesman.

== See also ==
- American expatriate baseball players in Japan
