= Sadayoshi Fujimoto =

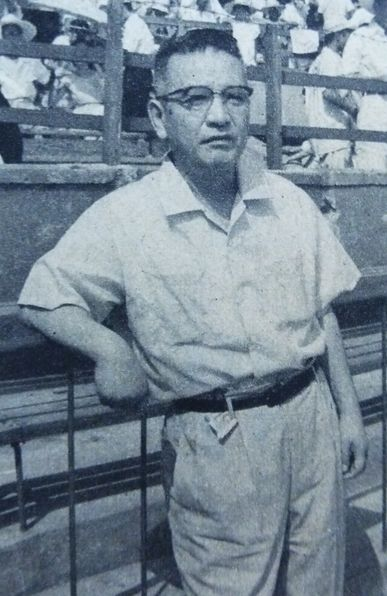
- Manager
- Born: December 20, 1904; Matsuyama, Japan
- Died: February 18, 1981 (aged 76)

JBL debut
- 1936, for the Tokyo Kyojin

Last appearance
- October 23, 1968, Hanshin Tigers

JBL/NPB statistics
- Games managed: 3,193
- Managerial record: 1,655–1,445
- Winning percentage: .534

Teams
- Tokyo Kyojin (1936–1942); Pacific Baseball Club/Taiyo Robins (1946–1947); Kinsei/Daiei Stars (1948–1956); Hankyu Braves (1957–1959); Hanshin Tigers (1961–1968)

Career highlights and awards
- 7x JBL champion (1936f–1937s, 1938f–1942); 2x Central League pennant winner (1962, 1964)

Member of the Japanese

Baseball Hall of Fame
- Induction: 1974

Sadayoshi Fujimoto (藤本 定義, Fujimoto Sadayoshi; December 20, 1904–February 18, 1981) was a Japanese baseball manager, most notably as the first manager of the Tokyo Kyojin, which was later renamed to the Yomiuri Giants. With the Kyojin, he won the Japanese Baseball League pennant seven times. He was also the manager of the Pacific Baseball Club (renamed to the Taiyo Robins during his tenure), the Hankyu Braves, and the Hanshin Tigers.

Fujimoto is third all-time for Japanese baseball managers in terms of career wins, with 1,655. He was inducted to the Japanese Baseball Hall of Fame in 1974.

== Early life ==
Fujimoto was born on December 20, 1904, in Matsuyama. He attended Ehime Prefectural Matsuyama Commercial High School, where he played baseball as a pitcher and third baseman. He participated in the Japanese High School Baseball Championship each of the four years he attended. He then attended Waseda University, also playing baseball. He graduated from Waseda in 1929.

== Managerial career ==
=== Tokyo Kyojin ===
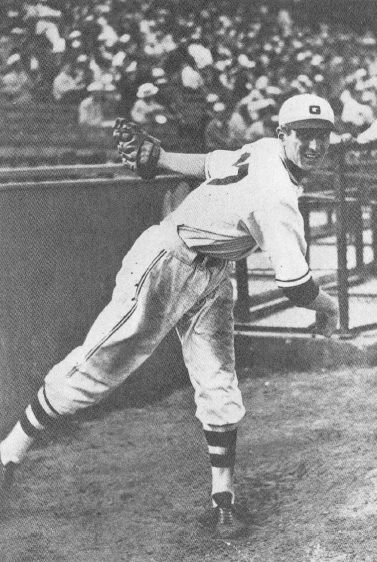
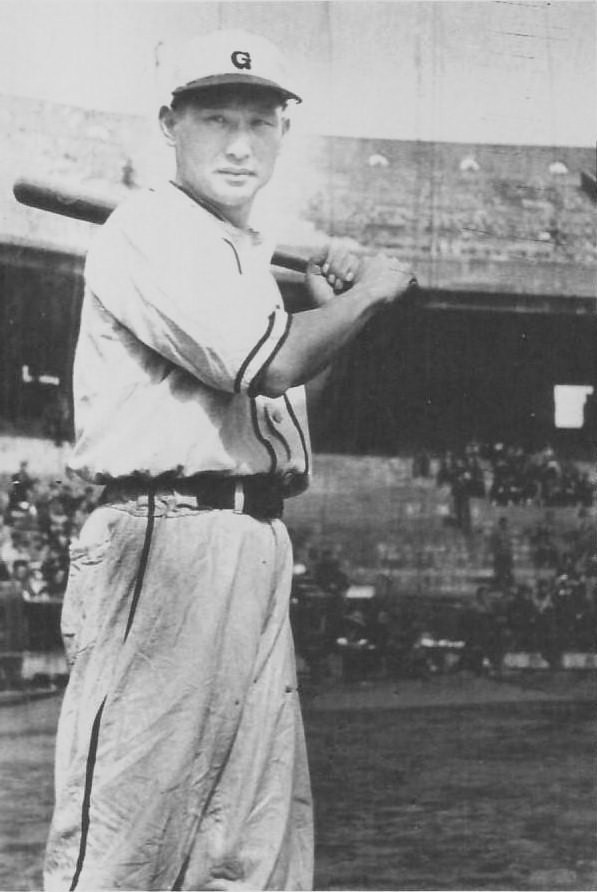
Several Hall of Famers played under Fujimoto while he managed the Kyojin, including Victor Starffin (left) and Tetsuharu Kawakami (right)

In 1936, Fujimoto was appointed manager of the Tokyo Kyojin, also known as the Giants, for its inaugural year. The Japanese Baseball League was initially played in series of half-seasons, the first being the fall season of 1936. Under Fujimoto, the Kyojin finished the season with a record of 18–9, finishing second in the league, behind the Osaka Tigers. The Kyojin and the Tigers played a best-of-three playoff series to determine the champion of the half-season. The Kyojin won, 2–1. The Kyojin would win the next half-season as well, with a record of 41–13–2, beating the Tigers by a half-game. The Kyojin wouldn't win the next two half-seasons, but won the 1938 fall season in convincing fashion, beating the Tigers by 3.5 games.

The league did away with the half-season format in 1939 and installed a full-season format, which would be used from then on. The Kyojin continued winning seasons under Fujimoto, winning the 1939 season with a 66–26–4 record, the 1940 season with a 76–28 record, the 1941 season with a 62–22–2 record, and the 1942 season with a 73–27–5 record. The 1940 and 1942 seasons are considered especially dominant in regards to the history of Japanese baseball. The team won by 10.5 and 12.5 games, respectively.

Fujimoto resigned as manager in 1943, to serve in World War II. Fujimoto was unable to regain his position following the war.

During his tenure, Fujimoto became infamous for his harsh practice routines, which teams adopted following the success of the Kyojin. The routines were dubbed "vomit practice", due to players regularly vomiting due to exhaustion. Osamu Mihara was quoted in his memoir:

"The Giants, at that time, did not resemble a professional team. Therefore, there was no other choice but to mold them into one... They did not have a moment's rest. They were near tears because the training was so hard..."

Several members of the Japanese Baseball Hall of Fame served under Fujimoto while he managed the Kyojin. Shigeru Chiba, Shosei Go, Tetsuharu Kawakami, Shigeru Mizuhara, Haruyasu Nakajima, Eiji Sawamura, Victor Starffin, and Kazuhiro Yamauchi all played for Fujimoto and went on to be inducted to the Hall of Fame.

=== Pacific Baseball Club/Taiyo Robins ===
Fujimoto got another chance to manage a baseball team in 1946. The offer was from the Pacific Baseball Club, formerly named the Asahi Baseball Club. The team had poor records since its inception, with only one winning season in its ten-year history. Under Fujimoto, the team finished with a 42–60–3 record for the 1946 season. The team renamed itself as the Taiyo Robins for the 1947 season, but the newly named team failed to achieve a winning season this year either, finishing 50–64–5.

Hall of Famer Juzo Sanada spent time under Fujimoto during his tenure with the club.

=== Kinsei/Daiei Stars ===
Fujimoto took the helm of the Kinsei Stars in 1948. The Stars were a fairly new team that was in its third season. Under Fujimoto, the team finished the season with a record of 60–73–7. 1949 saw the team change its name to the Daiei Stars, with the fortunes changing as well. The team finished 67–65–2. This was the first time a Fujimoto-managed team finished with a winning record since he left the Kyojin.

Nippon Professional Baseball replaced the Japanese Baseball League in 1950, and the Daiei Stars were one of the founding members of its Pacific League. The team continued its winning ways, finishing 62–54–4. The team then entered a two-year losing skid, finishing 41–52–8 in 1951 and 55–65–1 in 1952. 1953 saw a 63–53–4 record, but the last three Stars seasons under Fujimoto proved to be abysmal, finishing 43–92–5 in 1954, 53–87–1 in 1955, and 57–94–3 in 1956.

=== Hankyu Braves ===
Fujimoto took the helm of the Hankyu Braves for the 1957 season. The team finished with a winning record for the first two seasons under Fujimoto, with an 71–55–6 record in 1957, and a 73–51–6 record in 1958. 1959 was a poor season for the team, finishing 48–84–2.

=== Hanshin Tigers ===
Following a two-year hiatus from managing, Fujimoto acted as the interim manager for the Hanshin Tigers and was later appointed as the manager in 1961. The team finished 60–67–3 for the season.

1962 saw great success for the Tigers. They won the Central League with a record of 75–55–3 and faced the Toei Flyers in the Japan Series. After winning the first two games of the series and tying the third, the Tigers dropped the next four and the Flyers, led by former player Shigeru Mizuhara, won the series. 1963 was an off year for the Tigers, finishing 69–70–1.

The Tigers once again reached the Japan Series in 1964, after going 80–56–4 in the regular season and capturing the Central League pennant. The Tigers played the Nankai Hawks in a competitive series, with it coming down to a game 7, which the Tigers lost 3–0.

The Tigers, under Fujimoto, failed to reach the Japan Series again. The team went 71–66–3 in 1965. Fujimoto was appointed as Hanshin's general manager in 1966 and led the team to a 64–66–5 record. In 1967, the team went 70–60–6. Fujimoto's final year was in 1968. He resigned on October 23, with the team finishing the season with a 72–58–3 record.

== Managerial record ==
Managerial record by season
	League					
Club	Year	Pos	Game	W	L	WA
Tokyo Kyojin	1936	-	27	18	9	.667
Tokyo Kyojin	1937 (spring)	1st	56	41	13	.759
Tokyo Kyojin	1937 (autumn)	2nd	48	30	18	.625
Tokyo Kyojin	1938 (spring)	2nd	35	24	11	.686
Tokyo Kyojin	1938 (fall)	1st	40	30	9	.769
Tokyo Kyojin	1939	1st	96	66	26	.717
Tokyo Kyojin	1940	1st	104	76	28	.731
Tokyo Kyojin	1941	1st	86	62	22	.738
Tokyo Kyojin	1942	1st	105	73	27	.730
Pacific Baseball Club/Taiyo Robins	1946	8th	105	42	60	.412
Pacific Baseball Club/Taiyo Robins	1947	7th	119	50	64	.439
Kinsei/Daiei Stars	1948	7th	140	60	73	.451
Kinsei/Daiei Stars	1949	3rd	134	67	65	.508
Kinsei/Daiei Stars	1950	3rd	120	62	54	.534
Kinsei/Daiei Stars	1951	4th	101	41	52	.441
Kinsei/Daiei Stars	1952	4th	121	55	65	.458
Kinsei/Daiei Stars	1953	3rd	120	63	53	.543
Kinsei/Daiei Stars	1954	8th	140	43	92	.319
Kinsei/Daiei Stars	1955	6th	141	53	87	.379
Kinsei/Daiei Stars	1956	7th	47	14	32	.304
Hankyu Braves	1957	4th	132	71	55	.563
Hankyu Braves	1958	3rd	130	73	51	.589
Hankyu Braves	1959	5th	84	27	55	.329
Hanshin Tigers	1961	4th	91	47	43	.522
Hanshin Tigers	1962	1st	133	75	55	.577
Hanshin Tigers	1963	3rd	140	69	70	.496
Hanshin Tigers	1964	1st	140	80	56	.588
Hanshin Tigers	1965	3rd	140	71	66	.518
Hanshin Tigers	1966	3rd	49	30	16	.652
Hanshin Tigers	1967	3rd	136	70	60	.538
Hanshin Tigers	1968	2nd	133	72	58	.554
Career total			3,193	1,655	1,445	.534
Source: Baseball-Reference

== Later life and death ==
Fujimoto was inducted into the Japanese Baseball Hall of Fame in 1974. He died on February 18, 1981, at the age of 76. His total managerial wins are the third-most of anybody who has managed Japanese baseball professionally.
