= Professional baseball in Japan =

Professional baseball in Japan first started in the 1920s, but it was not until the Greater Japan Tokyo Baseball Club (大日本東京野球倶楽部, Dai-nippon Tōkyō Yakyū Kurabu) was established in 1934 that the modern professional game had continued success.

== History ==
Baseball was introduced to Japan in 1872 by Horace Wilson, and its first formal team was established in 1878. For almost 30 years, until 1906, a game could be viewed free of charge, as it was considered shameful to take money for doing something the players liked.

=== Early attempts ===
In 1907, the first game was held that had a fee to watch. From 1908, several United States professional teams toured Japan and played against amateur teams made up mostly of university students, including both the Chicago White Sox and the New York Giants in 1913. Realizing that a professional league was necessary to improve, two professional teams were established in 1920. In the same year, teams held exhibition tours in Korea and Manchuria to spread baseball. This first professional league disintegrated in 1923 for financial reasons, and after repeated attempts to revive a professional league, it formally disbanded in 1929.

=== Japanese Baseball League ===
The American Major League Baseball outfielder Lefty O'Doul was instrumental in spreading baseball's popularity in Japan, serving as the sport's goodwill ambassador before and after World War II.

In 1934, the Greater Japan Tokyo Baseball Club (大日本東京野球倶楽部, Dai-nippon Tōkyō Yakyū Kurabu) was established, reviving professional baseball. A second team, the Osaka Baseball Club (大阪野球倶楽部, Ōsaka Yakyū Club) was established in the following year. The former became the Yomiuri Giants (O'Doul dubbed the team the "Tokyo Giants") and the latter became the Hanshin Tigers. In 1936, five other teams also formed, and the Japanese Baseball League (JBL) was started. Because of World War II, the JBL was forced to stop playing for a year beginning in 1944; it restarted on November 6, 1945, and a full season was played the next year.

A rival four-team league, known as the Kokumin League (国民リーグ, Kokumin Riigu), played a 30-game summer season in 1947. Unable to compete against the more established JBL, the Kokumin League disbanded a few games into the 1947 fall season.

=== Nippon Professional Baseball ===
The Japanese Baseball League disbanded in 1949, reorganizing itself in 1950 as Nippon Professional Baseball (NPB). (It is called Puro Yakyū (プロ野球), which simply is a translation of professional baseball.) The Central League included the established teams, and the Pacific League was made up of new teams and players. The Pacific League uses the designated hitter style of play. The pro baseball season is eight months long with games beginning in April. Teams play 144 games (as compared to the 162 games of the American major league teams), followed by a playoff system, culminating in a championship held in October, known as the Japan Series.

Corporations with interests outside baseball own the teams. Historically, teams have been identified with their owners, not where the team is based. However, in recent years, many owners have chosen to include a place name in the names of their teams; seven of the 12 Nippon Professional Baseball League (NPB) teams are currently named with both corporate and place names. Maruha Corporation has taken this one step farther by completely dropping its name from its NPB team, the Yokohama BayStars.

==== Strike of 2004 ====
On September 18, 2004, professional baseball players went on a two-day strike, the first strike in over 70 years. The strike arose from a dispute that took place between the owners and the players' union concerning the merging of the Osaka Kintetsu Buffaloes and the Orix BlueWave, and the failure of the owners to agree to create a new team to fill the void resulting from the merger. The owners wanted to get rid of the financially defunct Buffaloes, and merge the two baseball leagues, since teams in the Central League saw much higher profits than the Pacific League, having popular teams such as the Yomiuri Giants and Hanshin Tigers. The dispute received huge press coverage (which mostly favored the players' union) and was dubbed one of the biggest events in the history of Japanese baseball. Proposals and amendments concerning interleague games, player drafting, and management were also discussed between the players union and the owners during this period. The players decided to strike on September 18–19, when no progress was made in the negotiations, as there was insufficient time left in the season to hold discussions. The dispute officially ended after the two groups reached consensus on September 23, 2004. As part of the agreement, the Buffaloes were allowed to merge with the Blue Wave (forming into the Orix Buffaloes); in addition, the Tohoku Rakuten Golden Eagles were newly created (at a reduced "entry fee") to keep the former six-team league structure. Other agreements included the leagues adopting interleague play to help the Pacific League gain exposure by playing the more popular Central league teams. All these changes took place before the 2005 season. In December 2004, SoftBank, an internet service provider, purchased the Fukuoka Daiei Hawks to help with finances in the Pacific League.

=== International play ===
Since 1986, a team of Major League Baseball All-Stars has made a biennial end-of-the-season tour of Japan, playing exhibitions games against the Nippon Professional Baseball All-Stars in the Major League Baseball Japan All-Star Series.

Starting in 1992 and continuing intermittently, several Major League Baseball teams have played exhibition games against Japanese teams. American teams popular in Japan include the Chicago Cubs, Seattle Mariners, Boston Red Sox, and New York Yankees, at least in part due to Japanese players on those teams.

2005 marked the first Asia Series, pitting the champions of the Japanese, South Korean, and Taiwanese leagues along with the Mainland China All-Stars.

== Differences from Major League Baseball ==
The NPB rules are essentially those of Major League Baseball, but technical elements are slightly different: The Nippon league uses a smaller baseball strike zone and playing field. The Japanese baseball is wound more tightly and is harder than an American baseball. The strike zone is narrower "inside" than away from the batter. Five Nippon league teams have fields whose small dimensions would violate the American Official Baseball Rules.

Also unlike MLB, game length is limited and tie games are allowed. In the regular season, the limit is twelve innings, while in the playoffs, there is a fifteen-inning limit (games in Major League Baseball, by comparison, continue until there is a winner; the 2002 All-Star Game, an exhibition game, was a notorious exception). Additionally, since the 2011 NPB season, an inning occurring three hours and thirty minutes after the first pitch was the final inning, due to power limits imposed because of the 2011 Tōhoku earthquake and tsunami.

A team cannot have more than four foreign players on a 25-man game roster, although there is no limit on the number of foreign players that it may sign. If there are four, they cannot all be pitchers nor all be position players. This limits the cost and competition for expensive players of other nationalities, and is similar to rules in many European sports leagues' roster limits on non-European players.

In each of the two Nippon Professional Baseball leagues, teams with the best winning percentage go on to a stepladder-format playoff (3 vs 2, winner vs 1). Occasionally, a team with more total wins has been seeded below a team that had more ties and fewer losses and, therefore, had a better winning percentage. The winners of each league compete in the Japan Series.

== Foreign players in professional baseball in Japan ==
The American writer Robert Whiting wrote in his 1977 book The Chrysanthemum and the Bat that,

The Japanese view of life, stressing group identity, cooperation, hard work, respect for age, seniority and 'face' has permeated almost every aspect of the sport. Americans who come to play in Japan quickly realize that Baseball Samurai Style is different.

While others have objected to characterizing the sport in these terms, many Japanese players and managers describe themselves this way.

Fumito "Jimmy" Horio became the first American to play professional baseball in Japan when he joined the Dai Nippon Tokyo Yakyu Kurabu (Tokyo Giants) in December 1934, touring with them in 1935.

Horio, Jimmy Bonna, Kiyomi "Slim" Hirakawa, Kazuyoshi "George" Matsuura, Andrew "Bucky" Harris McGalliard (Japan's "Bucky Harris"), Herbert "Buster" North, Yoshio "Sam" Takahashi, and Tadashi "Bozo" Wakabayashi became the first Americans to play in Japan's professional baseball league in 1936.

Hundreds of foreigners—particularly Americans—have played Nippon Professional Baseball. Taiwanese nationals Shosei Go and Hiroshi Oshita both starred in the 1940s. American players began to steadily find spots on NPB rosters in the 1960s. American players hold several NPB records, including highest career batting average (Leron Lee, .334), highest single-season batting average (Randy Bass, .389), and the dubious record of most strikeouts in a season by a hitter (Ralph Bryant, 204). Americans rank #3 (Tuffy Rhodes, 55) and #5 (Randy Bass, 54) on the list of most home runs in a season, and #2 in single-season RBI (Bobby Rose, 153). Curaçaoan–Dutch outfielder Wladimir Balentien holds the NPB single-season home run record with 60 round-trippers in 2013.

Koreans have had an impact in the NPB as well, including such standout players as Lee Seung-yuop, Sun Dong-yol, Baek In-chun, Lee Jong-beom, and Dae-ho Lee. Venezuelans Alex Ramírez, Alex Cabrera, Bobby Marcano, and Roberto Petagine all had long, successful NPB careers. The Dominican third-baseman José Fernández played eleven years in the NPB, compiling a .282 batting average with 206 home runs and 772 runs batted in.

Since the 1970s, foreigners have also made an impact in Nippon Professional Baseball's managing and coaching ranks, with Americans Bobby Valentine and Trey Hillman managing their respective teams to Japan Series championships.

Many of the most celebrated foreign players came to Japan after not finding success in the Major Leagues. (see: "Big in Japan")

== See also ==
- Baseball in Japan
- List of Japanese baseball players
- Mr. Baseball
- Ōendan

== General and cited references ==
- Crepeau, Richard C. "Pearl Harbor: A Failure of Baseball?". The Journal of Popular Culture 15, no. 4 (1982): 67–74.
- Lewis, Michael, and William Londo ed., "Baseball and Besuboru in Japan and the U.S." Studies on Asia Series III, 3, no. 2 (Fall 2006).
- Roden, Donald. "Baseball and the Quest for National Dignity in Meiji Japan". The American Historical Review 85, no. 3 (1980): 511–534.
- Whiting, Robert. The Chrysanthemum and the Bat: Baseball Samurai Style. New York: Dodd, Mead, 1977. ISBN 0-396-07317-4.
- Whiting, Robert. The Meaning of Ichiro: The New Wave from Japan and the Transformation of Our National Pastime. Warner Books, 2004; retitled for the 2005 paperback to The Samurai Way of Baseball: The New Wave from Japan and the Transformation of Our National Pastime. ISBN 0-446-53192-8, ISBN 0-446-69403-7.
- Whiting, Robert. You Gotta Have Wa. New York: Macmillan, 1989. ISBN 0-02-627661-5, ISBN 0-679-72947-X.
