= Tokuyuki Hidaka =

Japanese baseball player (born 1916)

- Outfielder
- Born: August 31, 1916; Kyoto, Japan
- Batted: Right Threw: Left

Japanese Baseball League debut
- 1936, for the Hankyu

Last appearance
- 1940, for the Hankyu

Career statistics
- Batting average: .000
- Home runs: 0
- RBI: 0
- Stats at Baseball Reference

Teams
- Hankyu (1936, 1940) (NPB)

Tokuyuki Hidaka (born August 31, 1916) played for Hankyu of the Japanese Baseball League in 1936 and 1940. He was without a hit in 15 at-bats the first season and was 0-for-1 the latter. As a pitcher, he started a game in 1940, going 0–1 with an 11.57 ERA. He also played outfield and first base.

He attended Heian High School and pitched in the 1933 Japanese High School Baseball Championship.
