= 1949 Nippon Professional Baseball season =

1949 NPB season
- League: Nippon Professional Baseball
- Sport: Baseball

Regular season
- Season MVP: Fumio Fujimura (Osaka Tigers)
- Finals champions: Yomiuri Giants
- Runners-up: Hankyu Braves

NPB seasons
- ← 1948 1950 →

The 1949 Nippon Professional Baseball season was the 14th and final season of Nippon Professional Baseball (formerly known as the Japanese Baseball League) After the season ended, the league was organized into Nippon Professional Baseball (NPB), which saw the teams re-structured into two distinct leagues (Central and Pacific).

== Standings ==
| Team | G | W | L | T | Pct. | GB |
|---|---|---|---|---|---|---|
| Yomiuri Giants | 134 | 85 | 48 | 1 | .639 | - |
| Hankyu Braves | 136 | 69 | 64 | 3 | .519 | 16.0 |
| Daiei Stars | 134 | 67 | 65 | 2 | .508 | 17.5 |
| Nankai Hawks | 135 | 67 | 67 | 1 | .500 | 18.5 |
| Chunichi Dragons | 137 | 66 | 68 | 3 | .493 | 19.5 |
| Osaka Tigers | 137 | 65 | 69 | 3 | .485 | 20.5 |
| Tokyu Flyers | 138 | 64 | 73 | 1 | .467 | 23.0 |
| Taiyo Robins | 133 | 52 | 81 | 0 | .391 | 33.0 |

== See also ==
- Japanese Baseball League
- 1949 All-American Girls Professional Baseball League season
- 1949 Major League Baseball season
