= Toshio Kurosawa =

Toshio Kurosawa may refer to:

- Toshio Kurosawa (baseball)
- Toshio Kurosawa (actor)
