= 1962 Japan Series =

Team (Wins)	Managers	Season
Toei Flyers (4)	Shigeru Mizuhara	78–52–3 (.600), 5 GA
Hanshin Tigers (2)	Sadayoshi Fujimoto	75–55–3 (.577), 4 GA
- Dates: October 13–21
- MVP: Masayuki Dobashi (Toei); Masayuki Tanemo (Toei)
- FSA: Yoshio Yoshida (Hanshin)

The 1962 Japan Series was the championship series of Nippon Professional Baseball (NPB) for the 1962 season. The 13th edition of the Series, it was a best-of-seven playoff that matched the Pacific League champion Toei Flyers against the Central League champion Hanshin Tigers. The Flyers won the series in seven games (one tie) over the Tigers. Shigeru Mizuhara, previously the champion manager of the Yomiuri Giants, became the second manager to win championships with multiple teams with the victory for the Flyers.

== Summary ==
PL Toei Flyers (4) vs. CL Hanshin Tigers (2)

Game	Date	Score	Location	Time	Attendance
1	October 13	Toei Flyers – 5, Hanshin Tigers – 6	Koshien Stadium	3:08	35,692
2	October 14	Toei Flyers – 0, Hanshin Tigers – 5	Koshien Stadium	2:08	35,995
3	October 16	Hanshin Tigers – 2, Toei Flyers – 2	Meiji Jingu Stadium	3:44	38,733
4	October 17	Hanshin Tigers – 1, Toei Flyers – 3	Meiji Jingu Stadium	2:25	37,741
5	October 18	Hanshin Tigers – 1, Toei Flyers – 3	Korakuen Stadium	2:43	30,187
6	October 20	Toei Flyers – 7, Hanshin Tigers – 4	Koshien Stadium	2:34	21,214
7	October 21	Toei Flyers – 2, Hanshin Tigers – 1	Koshien Stadium	3:19	29,192

== Matchups ==
=== Game 1 ===
Saturday, October 13, 1962 – 1:01 pm at Koshien Stadium in Nishinomiya, Hyōgo Prefecture

Team	1	2	3	4	5	6	7	8	9	10	R	H	E
Toei	0	0	5	0	0	0	0	0	0	0	5	8	5
Hanshin	0	1	4	0	0	0	0	0	0	1X	6	10	1
WP: Minoru Murayama (1–0) LP: Yukio Ozaki (0–1); Home runs: TOE: Katsutoyo Yoshida (1); HAN: None

=== Game 2 ===
Sunday, October 14, 1962 – 1:08 pm at Koshien Stadium in Nishinomiya, Hyōgo Prefecture

Team	1	2	3	4	5	6	7	8	9	R	H	E
Toei	0	0	0	0	0	0	0	0	0	0	2	0
Hanshin	0	0	0	2	0	0	0	3	X	5	9	0
WP: Minoru Murayama (2–0) LP: Masayuki Dobashi (0–1); Home runs: TOE: None; HAN: Katsumi Fujimoto (1)

=== Game 3 ===
Tuesday, October 16, 1962 – 1:00 pm at Meiji Jingu Stadium in Shinjuku, Tokyo

Team	1	2	3	4	5	6	7	8	9	10	11	12	13	14	R	H	E
Hanshin	0	0	0	1	0	1	0	0	0	0	0	0	0	0	2	11	1
Toei	0	0	0	0	0	1	1	0	0	0	0	0	0	0	2	10	1
Home runs: HAN: None; TOE: Shōichi Busujima (1)

=== Game 4 ===
Wednesday, October 17, 1962 – 1:00 pm at Meiji Jingu Stadium in Shinjuku, Tokyo

Team	1	2	3	4	5	6	7	8	9	R	H	E
Hanshin	1	0	0	0	0	0	0	0	0	1	5	1
Toei	0	0	0	3	0	0	0	0	X	3	6	0
WP: Motohiro Andō (1–0) LP: Masaaki Koyama (0–1)

=== Game 5 ===
Thursday, October 18, 1962 – 1:01 pm at Korakuen Stadium in Bunkyō, Tokyo

Team	1	2	3	4	5	6	7	8	9	10	11	R	H	E
Hanshin	2	0	0	0	0	0	2	0	0	0	0	4	10	0
Toei	3	0	0	1	0	0	0	0	0	0	2X	6	13	0
WP: Masayuki Dobashi (1–1) LP: Masaaki Koyama (0–2); Home runs: HAN: Katsumi Fujimoto (2); TOE: Katsutoyo Yoshida (2), Kōichi Iwashita (1)

=== Game 6 ===
Saturday, October 20, 1962 – 1:00 pm at Koshien Stadium in Nishinomiya, Hyōgo Prefecture

Team	1	2	3	4	5	6	7	8	9	R	H	E
Toei	1	2	0	1	2	0	0	1	0	7	10	0
Hanshin	1	0	0	0	1	2	0	0	0	4	8	1
WP: Motohiro Andō (2–0) LP: Minoru Murayama (2–1); Home runs: TOE: Isao Harimoto (1); HAN: Yoshio Yoshida (1)

=== Game 7 ===
Sunday, October 21, 1962 – 1:01 pm at Koshien Stadium in Nishinomiya, Hyōgo Prefecture

Team	1	2	3	4	5	6	7	8	9	10	11	12	R	H	E
Toei	0	0	0	0	0	0	0	0	0	1	0	1	2	5	2
Hanshin	0	0	0	0	0	0	0	0	0	1	0	0	1	10	0
WP: Masayuki Dobashi (2–1) LP: Minoru Murayama (2–2); Home runs: TOE: Akio Saionji (1); HAN: None

== See also ==
- 1962 World Series
