= Donald Roden =

American historian

Donald Roden is an associate professor of history at Rutgers University. He is mostly known for his efforts in combating the prison recidivism rate through a means of education. He is the founder of Rutgers' Mountainview Prison Project, a program that recruits and prepares ex-offenders during their incarceration, and supports their pursuit of an undergraduate degree at Rutgers, The State University of New Jersey, after their release. Since 2005, he is responsible for the admittance of over 30 ex-offenders into Rutgers University, many of which have attained their bachelor's degree. Donald Roden has also written about a variety of subjects dealing with East Asian history including Japanese baseball, Taisho culture, and foreigners in Meiji Japan.

He was awarded in 2006 for 30 years of service to Rutgers. 2012 marked the most successful year during the program's short existence. Roden was the recipient of The Ernest E. McMahon-Class of 1930 Award, and one of six other recipients for the 2012 Human Dignity Award, both at Rutgers University.

His book Schooldays in Imperial Japan: A Study in the Culture of a Student Elite was reviewed in numerous journals. He also authored a number of Monarch Notes for that publisher.
