= Toshio Kurosawa (baseball) =

Japanese baseball player (1914–1947)

Kurosawa Toshio 黒沢 俊夫
- Outfielder
- Born: June 10, 1914; Osaka Prefecture, Japan
- Died: June 23, 1947 (aged 33)
- Batted: Left Threw: Left

Japanese Baseball League debut
- 1936, for the Nagoya Kinko

Last Japanese Baseball League appearance
- 1947, for the Yomiuri Giants

Career hitting statistics
- Batting average: .259
- Hits: 459
- Home runs: 7
- Runs batted in: 201

Teams
- Nagoya Kinko (1936–1940); Taiyō Baseball Club / Nishitetsu Baseball Club (1941, 1943); Tokyo Kyojin / Yomiuri Giants (1944, 1946-1947)

Toshio Kurosawa (黒沢 俊夫, Kurosawa Toshio; June 10, 1914 – June 23, 1947) was a Japanese baseball outfielder who played eight seasons in the Japanese Baseball League from 1936 to 1947. His career was cut short due to typhoid fever, from which he died at age 33. Kurosawa's number 4 was retired by his last club, the Yomiuri Giants, the same year, and was among the first to be retired in all of Japanese baseball.

== Biography ==
=== Amateur (High school and college) ===
Born in Osaka Prefecture, Kurosawa played for Osaka Prefectural Yao High School. He appeared in the Spring and Summer Koshien high school baseball tournaments a total of 5 times.

After matriculating to Kansai University, Kurosawa became a leading figure in the University club's golden era, batting fourth in the lineup. There he played alongside future Japanese Hall of Fame pitcher Yukio Nishimura. Kurosawa was named outfielder in 1933 while on a club trip to Hawaii.

=== Nagoya Kinko / Nishitetsu ===
Kurosawa debuted with Nagoya Kinko in 1936, in the inaugural season of the Japanese Baseball League. By the spring season tournament he became a regular in the outfield. In 1937, while batting .295 in the spring season (third in the league) and .279 in the fall season (12th), Kurosawa was active on defense and on the basepaths, recording 32 steals for the year.

In the offseason, he took leave from his club for military service and missed the next 2 seasons, returning in 1940. The next year, Nagyoa Kinko merged with the Tokyo Senators to form the Taiyō Baseball Club, and Kurosawa joined the combined team. After the 1941 season, he again left baseball for the military, this time only for one year. Kurosawa returned to the field in 1943 for the newly renamed Nishitetsu Baseball Club. That year, while batting only .190 he drove in 32 runs to finish 3rd in the league.

=== Tokyo Kyojin / Yomiuri Giants ===
In 1944, Nishitetsu disbanded as a result of worsening finances and a shortage of players due to the draft during World War II. As a result, Kurosawa was transferred to the Tokyo Kyojin along with other players including Sadao Kondo. In the shortened season that year (35 games), Kurosawa hit for a career-high .348 batting average (2nd in the league) at leadoff, playing a key supporting role while many Kyojin regulars were on active duty. Notable for his speed, Kurosawa stole home 10 times, for 2nd all-time in Japanese baseball history, and shares the record for having 2 steals of home in a single game (set on May 20 against Kinki Nippon at Nishinomiya Stadium.

When the league returned to play after the war in 1946, Kurosawa hit cleanup in a lineup that included Giants legends Tetsuharu Kawakami and Shigeru Chiba. He recorded 60 RBIs and was one of the few .300 hitters on the team that season (.308, 8th in the league). He appeared for the East team in the East-West Competition (a precursor to the All-Star Game), and in Game 5 he hit a bases-clearing walk-off triple in the bottom of the 12th inning.

=== Illness and death ===
In the middle of the 1947 season, Kurosawa contracted typhoid fever, and soon after he was admitted to The University of Tokyo Hospital where he died on June 23 at the age of 33. Kurosawa had steadfastly continued to play through his worsening condition, and it is said that his commitment to the team ultimately cost him his life. The club held a rare team funeral for Kurosawa.

=== Honors ===
The Giants retired Kurosawa's uniform number 4 soon after his death. Led by Shigeru Chiba, his former teammates proposed the honor, recognizing his achievements playing for the club during the challenging wartime era as well as honoring his untimely passing, and his number was retired alongside Eiji Sawamura. Kurosawa wished, "When I die, I want you to bury me in my uniform," and ultimately he was.

== Player characteristics ==
By the time he joined the Kyojin, Kurosawa's power had declined, but he was known for his ability to hit to all fields and for his clutch hitting.
