= Kazuto Tsuruoka =

Japanese baseball player and manager

Kazuto Tsuruoka 鶴岡 一人
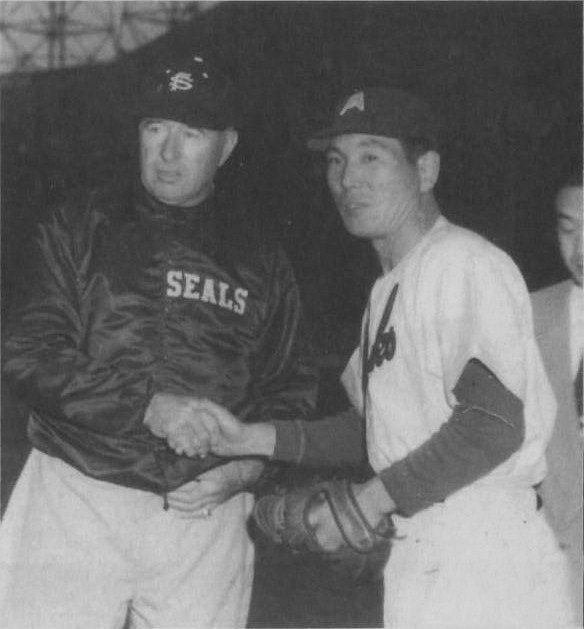
- Infielder / Manager
- Born: July 27, 1916; Kure, Hiroshima, Japan
- Died: March 7, 2000 (aged 83); Japan
- Batted: Right Threw: Right

JBL debut
- March 28, 1939, for the Nankai Club

Last NPB appearance
- October 12, 1952, for the Nankai Hawks

JBL/NPB statistics
- Batting average: .295
- Home runs: 61
- Hits: 790
- RBIs: 467
- Stolen bases: 143

Teams
- As player: Nankai Club/Kinki Great Ring/Nankai Hawks (1939, 1946–1952); As manager: Great Ring/Nankai Hawks (1949–1968)

Career highlights and awards
- 2x JBL champion (1946, 1948); 2x Japan Series champion (1959, 1964); 2× Japanese Baseball League MVP (1946, 1948); Pacific League MVP (1951); Best Nine Award (1951); JBL home run leader (1939); JBL RBI leader (1946)

Member of the Japanese

Baseball Hall of Fame
- Induction: 1965
- Election method: Selection Committee for the Players

Kazuto Tsuruoka (鶴岡 一人, Tsuruoka Kazuto; July 27, 1916 – March 7, 2000), also known as Kazuto Yamamoto, was a Japanese professional baseball infielder and manager in the Japan Baseball League (JBL) and Nippon Professional Baseball (NPB).

Tsuruoka played for the same franchise in 1939, and from 1946 to 1952, which during his career changed names from the Nankai Club to Kinki Great Ring, and ultimately to the Nankai Hawks. Tsuruoka did not play professional baseball from 1940 to 1945 due to World War II. In 1939, he won the JBL home run title with 10. In 1946, he won the JBL Most Valuable Player Award, repeating the feat in 1948. His team won the JBL championship both those years.

In 1949, he was named player-manager of the Hawks. His playing career ended after the 1952 season, but he stayed on as the team's manager through the 1968 season, guiding the team to Japan Series championships in 1959 and 1964. His managerial record overall was 1773–1140, for a winning percentage of .609. His teams finished .500 or better in 21 of 23 seasons as a manager.

Tsuruoka was elected by the Selection Committee for the Players to the Japanese Baseball Hall of Fame in 1965.

Awards
Preceded by N.A. Tadashi Wakabayashi	Japanese Baseball League MVP; 1946; 1948	Succeeded by Tadashi Wakabayashi; Fumio Fujimura
