= Glenn Mickens =

American baseball player (1930–2019)

- Pitcher
- Born: July 26, 1930; Wilmar, California, U.S.
- Died: July 9, 2019 (aged 88); Kapaa, Hawaii, U.S.
- Batted: Right Threw: Right

Professional debut
- MLB: July 19, 1953, for the Brooklyn Dodgers
- NPB: April 18, 1959, for the Kintetsu Buffaloes

Last appearance
- MLB: July 30, 1953, for the Brooklyn Dodgers
- NPB: October 2, 1963, for the Kintetsu Buffaloes

MLB statistics
- Win–loss record: 0–1
- Earned run average: 11.37
- Strikeouts: 5

NPB statistics
- Win–loss record: 45–51
- Earned run average: 2.55
- Strikeouts: 546
- Stats at Baseball Reference

Teams
- Brooklyn Dodgers (1953); Kintetsu Buffaloes (1959–1963)

Glenn Roger Mickens (July 26, 1930 – July 9, 2019) was an American pitcher in Major League Baseball. He pitched in four games (two of which were starts) for the 1953 Brooklyn Dodgers. He also played for five years in Japan, from 1959 until 1963 for the Kintetsu Buffaloes. There, he compiled a record of 45–53 with a 2.54 ERA.

After his playing career, Mickens became a baseball coach at UCLA for many years.

Mickens died on July 9, 2019, from pneumonia, at age 88.

== See also ==
- American expatriate baseball players in Japan
