= Jimmy Bonner =

American baseball player

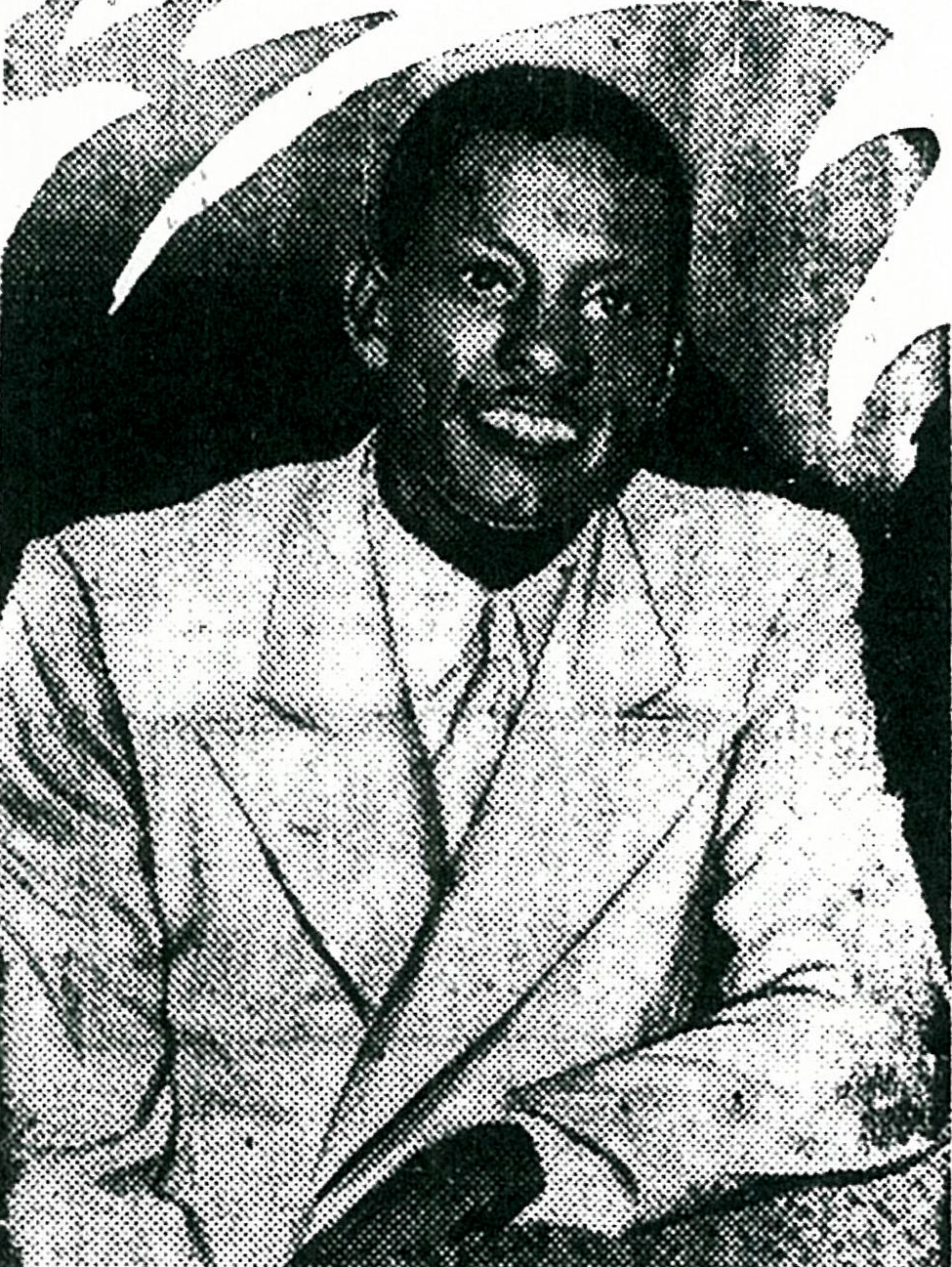
- Bonner in 1936
- Pitcher
- Born: September 18, 1906; Mansfield, Louisiana, United States
- Died: May 10, 1963 (aged 56); Oakland, California, United States

JBL debut
- October 23, 1936, for the Dai Tokyo

Last JBL appearance
- November 10, 1936

JBL statistics
- Win–loss: 0–1
- Earned run average: 10.24
- Strikeouts: 2

Teams
- Dai Tokyo (1936)

James Everett Bonner (Japanese: ジミー・ボンナ, romanized: Jimī Bonna, September 18, 1906 – May 10, 1963) was an American baseball player who played for Dai Tokyo in the Japanese Baseball League. Joining the team in its inaugural year, he was the first African American to play baseball professionally in Japan, 11 years before Jackie Robinson broke the color barrier in Major League Baseball.

== Early life ==
James Everett Bonner was born in Mansfield, Louisiana, the fourth of five children of Peter and Martha Ann (Lewis) Bonner. His parents divorced at an early age, and his mother remarried Rory Goldsmith, a sawmill worker. Goldsmith died when Jimmy was just a child, and by the age of 13 he was working as a courier for a drugstore.

== Baseball career ==
Bonner began playing baseball in junior high, and by 1932 he was a utility player for the Shreveport Black Sports. At 5 feet 10 inches, he was ambidextrous, throwing right-handed and batting left-handed. Later that year, he moved to West Oakland, California, and married Lillian Victor from Waggaman, an unincorporated community near New Orleans. In 1934, he played for the San Francisco Colored Giants (not to be confused with the modern MLB franchise), and in 1935, joined the Oakland Black Sox. In 1936, he became a pitcher for the Berkeley Grays in the Berkeley International League, an ethnically diverse consortium of Bay Area teams. He gained the nickname "Satchel" for his impressive performances in the league, once throwing 22 strikeouts in a single game.

On September 8, 1936, Japanese-American businessman Harry H. Kono recruited Bonner to play for Dai Tokyo Baseball Club in the newly formed Japanese Baseball League. Dai Tokyo and the Nagoya Golden Dolphins had suffered from a lack of domestic talent, so they began to look towards the United States. On September 18, Bonner boarded the SS President Pierce bound for Japan, arriving on October 5. His salary was 400 yen a month, in contrast to the 140 yen average for a typical Tokyo Giants player. The Japanese press heralded his arrival with headlines like "Black Pitcher Rushes onto the Scene, Excellent Fielder, Holder of Amazing Strikeout Record." Bonner played several positions, including pitcher and first baseman. His record on defense in Japan was generally disappointing; he was far more successful on the plate, with a batting average of 0.458 in 24 at-bats. In mid-November, Bonner was dismissed after only a month on the team. Historians have come up with a variety of explanations for his poor performance as a pitcher in Japan, including a smaller strike zone due to the lower average height of Japanese men as well as the smaller and more slippery baseballs used in Japan compared to American balls.

== Later life and death ==
After returning to the United States, Bonner became a porter for the Pullman Company while continuing to play baseball semi-professionally. He joined the U.S. Army in 1943 and returned to Pullman after the war, where he worked until his death in 1963.
