= Fumio Fujimura =

Japanese baseball player (1916–1992)

Fumio Fujimura 藤村 富美男
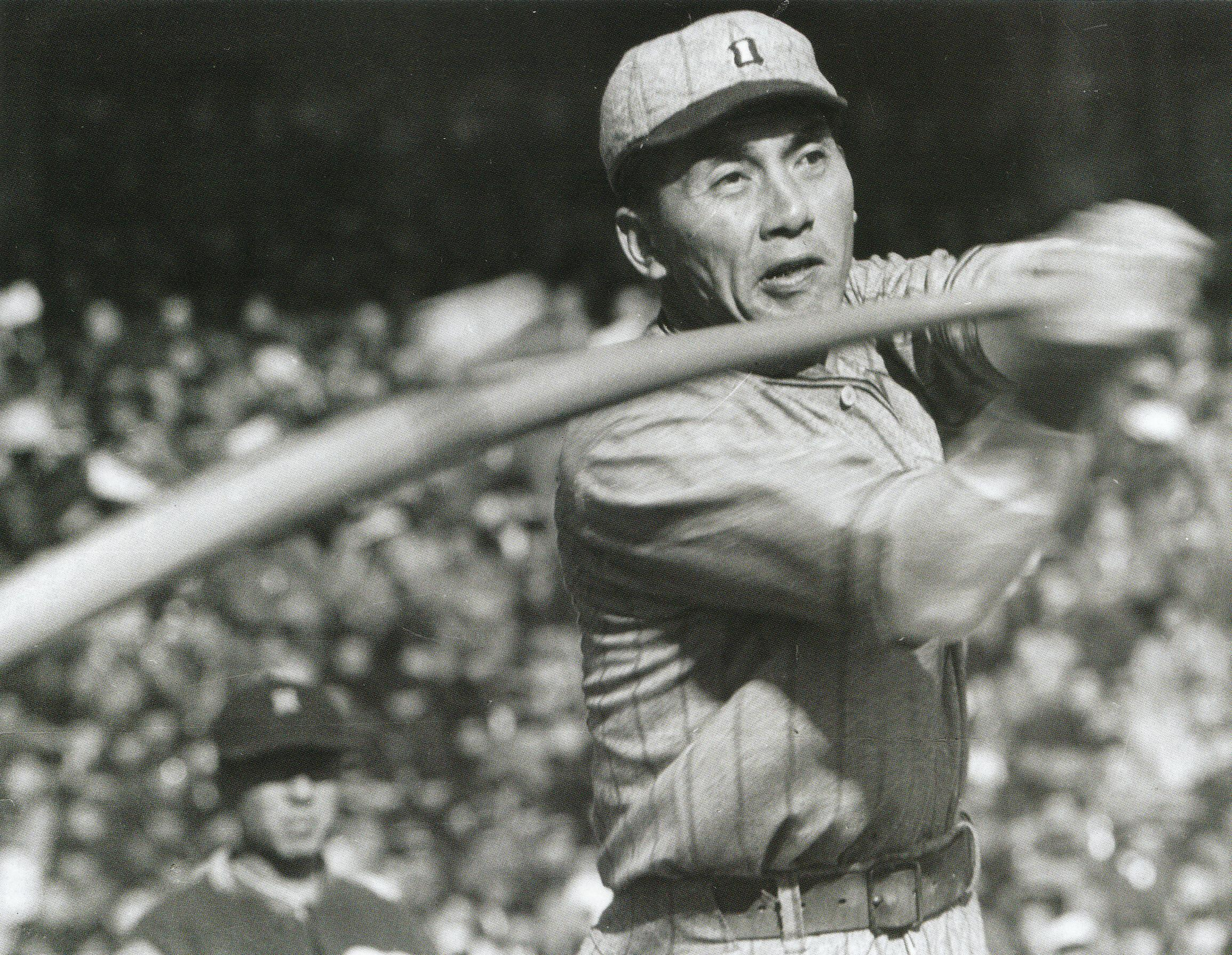
- Fujimura in 1948

Osaka Tigers – No. 10
- Infielder, Pitcher, Manager
- Born: August 14, 1916; Kure, Hiroshima, Japan
- Died: May 28, 1992 (aged 75)
- Batted: Right Threw: Right

Japanese Baseball League debut
- 1936, for the Osaka Tigers

Last Nippon Professional Baseball appearance
- 1958, for the Osaka Tigers

Career hitting statistics
- Batting average: .300
- Hits: 1,694
- Home runs: 224
- Runs batted in: 1,126

Career pitching statistics
- Win–loss record: 34-11
- ERA: 2.43
- Strikeouts: 183
- Stats at Baseball Reference

Teams
- As player: Hanshin/Osaka Tigers (1936–1938, 1943–1956, 1958); As manager: Osaka Tigers (1946, 1955–1957)

Career highlights and awards
- Japanese Baseball League MVP (1949); 3x Best Nine Award; 2x Hit for the cycle (October 2, 1948), (May 25, 1950); Hanshin Tigers #10 retired

Member of the Japanese

Baseball Hall of Fame
- Induction: 1974

Fumio Fujimura (藤村 富美男, Fujimura Fumio; August 14, 1916 – May 28, 1992) was a Japanese baseball infielder and pitcher who played 22 seasons in Nippon Professional Baseball (NPB) from 1936 to 1958. He began his career as a stellar right-handed pitcher for the Osaka Tigers, but achieved his greatest fame as a hitter.

A superstitious player, Fujimura never hurt insects or shaved before games. He was also hot-tempered, as he was once suspended for physically abusing an umpire. In 1950, Fujimura set the single-season record with 191 base hits. This record remained unbroken for 44 years, until Ichiro Suzuki surpassed it in 1994. Fujimura was inducted into the Japanese Baseball Hall of Fame in 1974. His number "10" has been retired by the Hanshin Tigers.

== Biography ==
=== High school ===
In the 1933 National High School Baseball Championship, Fujimura's team Taishō reached the quarterfinals, but Masao Yoshida of Chukyo Shogyo pitched a shutout in the game.

In the finale of the 1934 National High School Baseball Championship, Fujimura faced Tetsuharu Kawakami and struck him out three times in three at-bats. Fujimura's team won the championship.

=== Osaka/Hanshin Tigers ===
Fujimura debuted with the Osaka Tigers in 1936, the inaugural season of the Japanese Baseball League. He split his time between pitcher and second base. After initially being a starting pitcher, he generally pitched in a relief role thereafter. Fujimura missed five seasons in the JBL because of military service during World War II.

Fujimura acted as the Tigers' player-manager in 1946, leading them to a 59–46 record. That was also the last year he spent significant time pitching, going 13–2 with a 2.44 ERA.

With a stat line of 46 home runs, 142 RBI, and a .332 average, Fujimura was the Most Valuable Player in 1949, the last season before the JBL reorganized into Nippon Professional Baseball.

In 1950 Fujimura led the Central League with a .362 batting average (and setting the single-season hits record), and was a Best Nine Award-winner at third base. In 1953 Fujimura led the Central League in home runs and RBI, with 27 and 98 respectively.

As a pitcher, Fujimura compiled an astounding winning percentage of .756. He hit for the cycle twice, once during the single-league era (in 1948) and once in the current dual-league era, the only player to do that. As a hitter, Fujimura finished his career with 1,694 hits, 224 home runs, and 1,126 RBI, with a lifetime .300 batting average. He was selected a Best Nine Award-winner three times at third base.

After his playing career, Fujimura returned to manage the Tigers in 1955–1957.

Fujimura was inducted into the Japanese Baseball Hall of Fame in 1974.

Jim Albright, an expert on Japanese professional baseball, ranks Fujimura as among the top players in NPB history and possibly worthy of induction to the American Baseball Hall of Fame.

== Outside baseball ==
Fujimura appeared as an actor in the jidaigeki drama Shin Hissatsu Shiokinin in 1977 and Eiichi Kudo's film Aftermath of Battles Without Honor and Humanity in 1979.

== See also ==
- List of Nippon Professional Baseball players with 1,000 runs batted in

Awards
Preceded by Kazuto Yamamoto	Japanese Baseball League MVP; 1949	Succeeded by Makoto Kozuru and Kaoru Betto
