= Yamato Baseball Club =

Information
- League: Japanese Baseball League
- Ballpark: Korakuen Stadium
- Established: 1937
- Folded: 1944
- Former name(s): Korakuen Eagles (1937–1939); Kurowashi (1940–1941)
- Colors: Light blue and yellow
- Ownership: Dai-Nippon Beer (1939–1941); Yamato Ironworks (1942–1943)
- Manager: Shigeo Mori (1938–1939); Kazutaka Terauchi (1940–1942); Hisanori Karita (1942–1943); Toshio Kojima (1943)

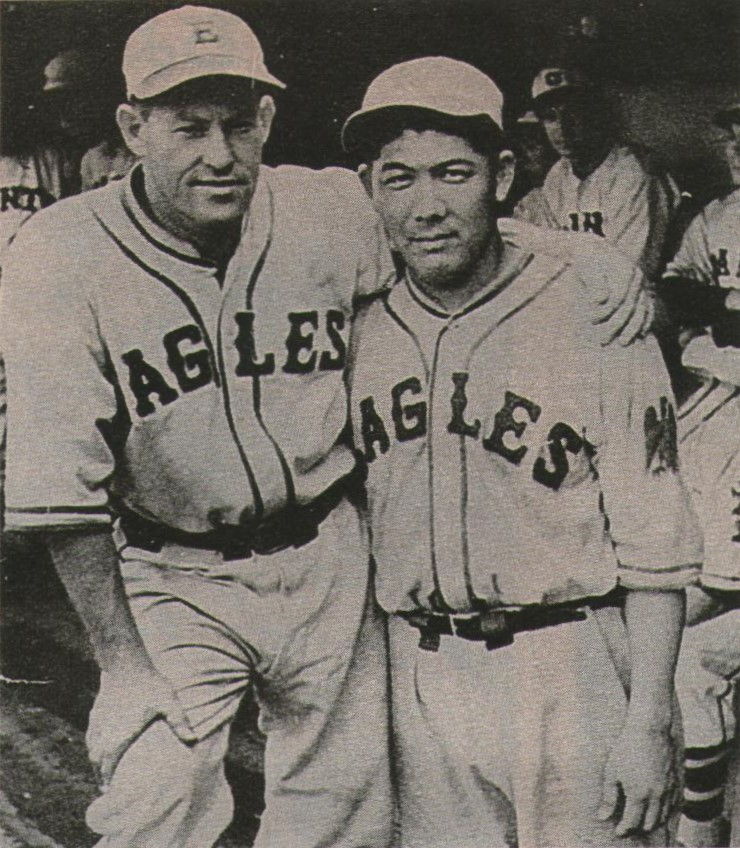
Harris McGalliard and Tadashi Kameda of the Eagles in 1937 or 1938.

The Yamato Baseball Club was a Japanese baseball team in the Japanese Baseball League (JBL). Based in Tokyo, the franchise was founded as the Korakuen Eagles before the 1937 season and was dissolved before the 1944 season.

== Franchise history ==
=== Korakuen Eagles ===
In 1937, catcher Harris McGalliard (better known as Bucky Harris), won the JBL Most Valuable Player Award with a batting average of .285 and 25 RBI (in 39 games).

=== Kurowashi ===
The team was owned by Ryutaro Takahashi of Dai-Nippon Beer from 1939 to 1941. For the 1940 and 1941 seasons, the team changed its name to Kurowashi (Black Eagles in Japanese; in October 1940, responding to rising hostility toward the West due to World War II, the league outlawed the use of English words in Japanese baseball).

Tadashi Kameda pitched two no-hitters for Kurowashi, on March 18, 1940, against the Lion Baseball Club, and on April 14, 1941, against the Osaka Tigers.

=== Yamato ===
Kenkichi Saeki, president of Yamato Ironworks, purchased the team in 1942. As a result, the team changed its name to the Yamato Baseball Club.

=== Dissolution ===
During its nine seasons of existence (including split fall and spring campaigns in 1937–1938), the franchise only had two winning campaigns and never finished higher than third in the JBL standings. (They usually finished in the second division.) As a result, the team was dissolved before the 1944 season (along with another JBL team, the Nishitetsu Baseball Club).

== Team statistics ==
| Year | Team name | Games | Wins | Losses | Ties | Win/Loss Percentage | Standings | Games behind |
|---|---|---|---|---|---|---|---|---|
| 1937 | Eagles | 105 | 12 | 44 | 0 | .214 | 8/8 | 30 |
| 1937 | Eagles | 105 | 28 | 19 | 2 | .596 | 3/8 | 10.5 |
| 1938 | Eagles | 75 | 18 | 15 | 2 | .545 | 4/9 | 10 |
| 1938 | Eagles | 75 | 15 | 20 | 5 | .429 | 7/9 | 13 |
| 1939 | Eagles | 96 | 29 | 65 | 2 | .309 | 9/9 | 38 |
| 1940 | Kurowashi | 104 | 46 | 54 | 4 | .460 | 6/8 | 28 |
| 1941 | Kurowashi | 85 | 28 | 56 | 1 | .333 | 7/8 | 34 |
| 1942 | Yamato | 105 | 27 | 68 | 10 | .284 | 8/8 | 43.5 |
| 1943 | Yamato | 84 | 35 | 43 | 6 | .449 | 6/8 | 17.5 |
| Overall record | | 654 | 238 | 384 | 34 | .388 | | |
