= Haruyasu Nakajima =

Japanese baseball player (1909–1987)

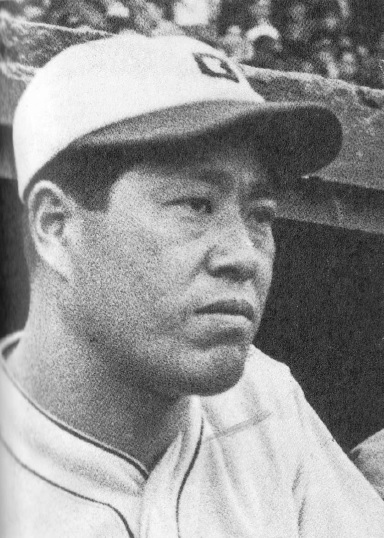
- Haruyasu Nakajima
- Outfielder
- Born: June 28, 1909; Matsumoto, Nagano Prefecture, Japan
- Died: April 21, 1987 (aged 77)
- Batted: Right Threw: Right

Japanese Baseball League (JBL) debut
- Spring, 1936, for the Tokyo Kyojin

Last appearance
- 1951, for the Taiyo Whales

JBL/Nippon Professional Baseball statistics
- Batting average: .270
- Hits: 889
- Home runs: 57
- Runs batted in: 493
- Stats at Baseball Reference

Teams
- As player: Tokyo Kyojin/Yomiuri Giants (1936–1949); Taiyo Whales (1950–1951); As manager: Yomiuri Giants (1941, 1946–1947, 1949); Taiyo Whales (1951)

Career highlights and awards
- 1938 JBL MVP (Fall); Japanese Triple Crown (1938 Fall); 1941 & 1949 JBL championship team manager

Member of the Japanese

Baseball Hall of Fame
- Induction: 1963

Haruyasu Nakajima (中島 治康 June 28, 1909 – April 21, 1987) was a Japanese baseball player. An outfielder with a strong throwing arm, he played an active part in the beginning of professional baseball in Japan.

Nakajima attended Waseda University, where he starred in the Tokyo Big6 Baseball League. He began his professional career in 1936 with the Japanese Baseball League, as a charter member of the Tokyo Kyojin. An excellent curveball hitter who used all parts of the field, in 1938 he was the first in Japan to become a triple crown player, as he compiled a .361 batting average, with 10 home runs and 38 RBI for the fall season. In addition, he was named league MVP for that season.

In 1941, Nakajima was named the Kyojin player-manager and he led his team to the JBL championship. He was again the team's player-manager in 1946-1947, and in 1949, when he led them (now known as the Yomiuri Giants) to another championship. During his time with the Kyojin/Giants. Nakajima led the league in homers twice, average once, and RBI four times.

In 1950, with the reorganization of the JBL into Nippon Professional Baseball, Nakajima and a number of other veteran players were sent from the Giants to the Taiyo Whales to compensate for that team's lack of players. Nakajima ended his career in 1951 as player-manager of the Whales, but they struggled to a 19–26 record under his leadership, and he was replaced before the end of the season.

Nakajima was inducted into the Japanese Baseball Hall of Fame in 1963, just the third player inducted. He died April 21, 1987.

Awards
Preceded by Hisanori Karita	Japanese Baseball League MVP; 1938 (Fall)	Succeeded by Victor Starffin
