= Nagoya Kinko =

Information
- League: Japanese Baseball League
- Established: 1936
- Folded: 1940; merged with Tsubasa Baseball Club
- Former name: Nagoya Golden Dolphins (1936)
- Ownership: Nagoya Shimbun
- Manager: Genzaburo Okada (1936–1940)

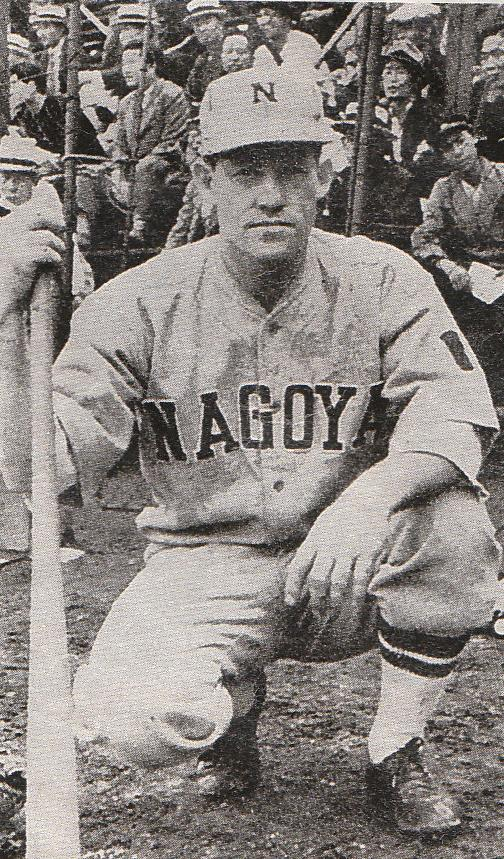
Harris McGalliard with Nagoya in 1936.

Nagoya Kinko (long name: Nagoya Kinnosachihiko) was a Japanese baseball team that played in the Japanese Baseball League (JBL) before it merged with another team. It was owned by the daily broadsheet Nagoya Shimbun. Notable players for the team over the course of its existence included Harris McGalliard, Herb North, and Toshio Kurosawa.

The club was founded as the Nagoya Golden Dolphins before the 1936 JBL season. In 1937 the team changed its name to Nagoya Kinko.

The franchise never had a winning record and never placed higher than fourth in the league standings. Few players wanted to play for the team,and it merged with the Tsubasa Baseball Club after the 1940 season to form the Taiyō Baseball Club (that franchise was itself dissolved following the 1943 JBL season).

== Team statistics ==
Year	Team name	Games	Wins	Losses	Ties	Win/Loss Percentage	Standings	Games behind
1936 (fall)	Golden Dolphins	28	9	19	0	.321	6/7	14
1937	Kinko	105	25	30	1	.455	5/8	16.5
1937	Kinko	105	23	25	1	.479	4/8	16
1938	Kinko	75	13	22	0	.371	6/9	10
1938	Kinko	75	11	29	0	.275	9/9	19.5
1939	Kinko	96	36	56	4	.391	7/9	30
1940	Kinko	104	34	63	7	.351	8/8	38.5
Overall record		408	151	244	13	.386		
