= Tadashi Wakabayashi =

American Japanese baseball player

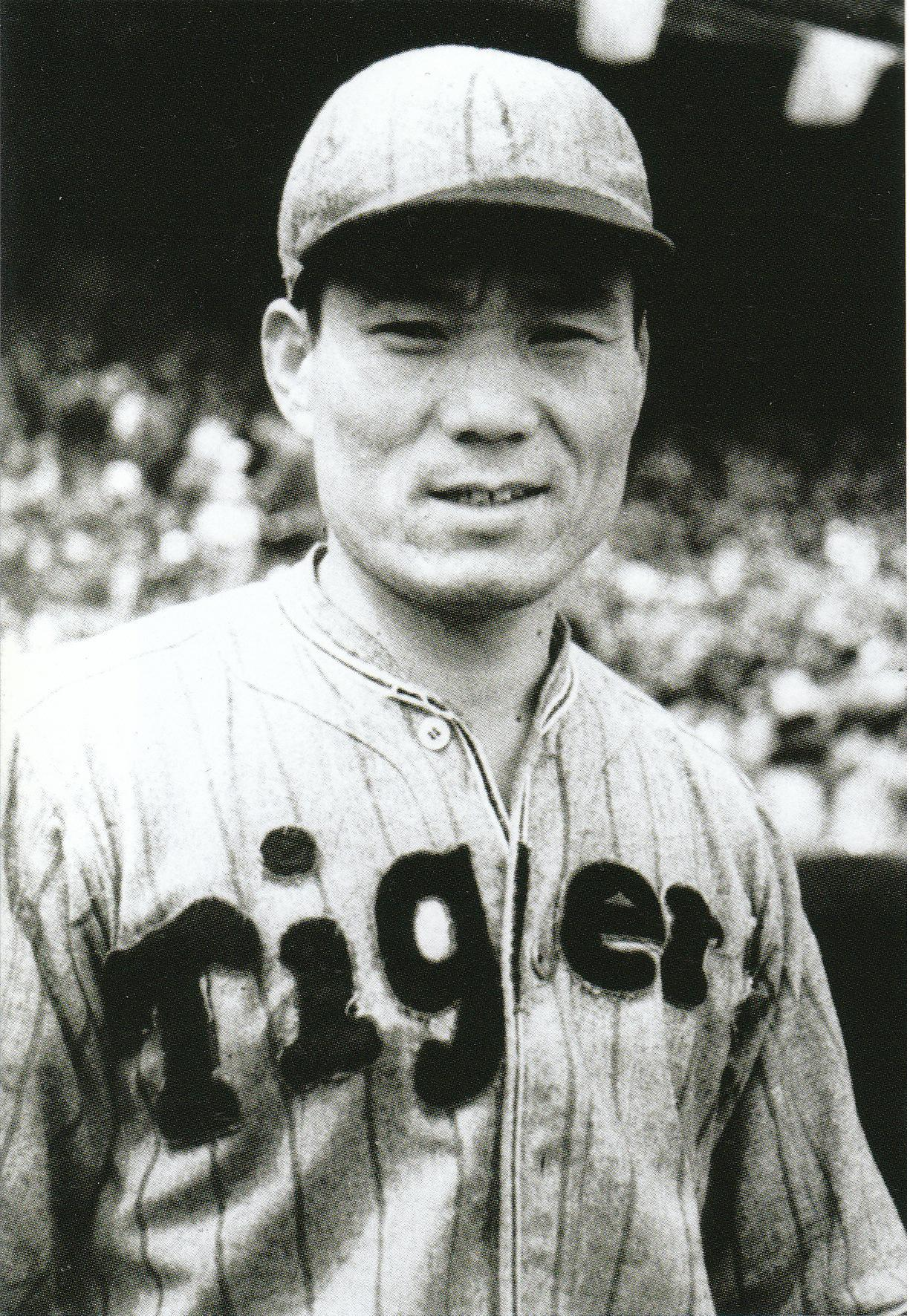
- Pitcher
- Born: March 1, 1908; Wahiawa, Hawaii Territory
- Died: March 5, 1965 (aged 57); Japan

NPB debut
- April 30, 1936, for the Osaka Tigers

Last appearance
- October 4, 1953, for the Mainichi Orions

Career statistics
- Win–loss record: 237–144
- Earned run average: 1.99
- Strikeouts: 1,000
- Stats at Baseball Reference

Teams
- As player: Osaka/Hanshin Tigers (1936–1949); Mainichi Orions (1950–1953); As manager: Hanshin/Osaka Tigers (1942–1949); Mainichi Orions (1953)

Career highlights and awards
- Japan Series champion (1950); 4× Japanese Baseball League pennant (1937 Fall, 1938 Spring, 1944, 1947); 2× Japanese Baseball League MVP (1944, 1947)

Member of the Japanese

Baseball Hall of Fame
- Induction: 1964

Tadashi Henry Wakabayashi (若林 忠志) (March 1, 1908 – March 5, 1965) was a professional baseball player from Oahu, Hawaii. He was a second generation Japanese American.

== Biography ==
Wakabayashi's parents had immigrated to Hawaii from Hiroshima, Japan, and Wakabayashi was born in Hawaii, giving him dual citizenship between the United States and Japan. He renounced his Japanese citizenship in 1928 but revived it when he moved to Japan.

== Baseball career ==
=== High school and college ===
Wakabayashi attended President William McKinley High School, and his powerful fastball made him the ace pitcher of the school's baseball team. In 1928, he was chosen to participate in an exhibition baseball tournament held in Japan, and he traveled to Japan for the first time that year. Professional baseball did not exist in Japan at that time, and Wakabayashi's amateur team played against university teams in the Tokyo Big6 Baseball League. Wakabayashi's pitching abilities did not go unnoticed, and Hosei University was particularly active in recruiting him. Wakabayashi himself was not opposed to the idea of remaining in Japan, and it seemed only a matter of time before he was admitted into Hosei University. However, rival schools accused Hosei University of using unethical tactics to strengthen the baseball team, and the school decided to temporarily place Wakabayashi in a junior high school in Yokohama, and admit him into the school the following year. Wakabayashi graduated from the junior high school in March 1929, and entered Hosei University the next semester.

The Tokyo Big6 Baseball League was dominated by Waseda University and Keio University, and the Hosei University team solely depended upon Wakabayashi's pitching to carry the team. He was unsuccessful in his first year due to differences between Japanese and American baseball, but gradually improved to win the league championship in Autumn, 1930. He injured his pitching arm in 1931, and had to switch to a side arm release to continue pitching. He was no longer able to throw fastballs, but improved his breaking pitches and control to continue his pitching success.

Wakabayashi led Hosei University to a second league championship in 1932, and pitched in every single league game in 1934 to win a third championship. His record in the league was 43-28, and he holds the college league record for career games pitched (87). He was also the first pitcher to win 40 games in the Tokyo Big6 Baseball League. He also married his wife in January 1933.

=== Professional and semi-professional career ===
He graduated from the university in 1935, and a friend introduced him to the Columbia Music Entertainment company, where he split time between working, and playing on the company's baseball team. In July 1935, the Tokyo Kyojin Gun baseball team returned from their tour in the United States, and numerous companies, including the Hanshin Electric Railway company, joined to form the first professional baseball league in Japan. Several companies made offers for Wakabayashi to join their professional team, and he signed with the Osaka Tigers (which later became the Hanshin Tigers) in January 1936.

Wakabayashi quickly emerged as the team's ace, and led the Tigers to championships in 1940 and 1944. Wakabayashi retreated to his wife's hometown in Ishinomaki, Miyagi at the end of World War II, but returned to professional baseball in 1947 to win his 200th professional game. He would mark 233 wins in his 13 seasons with the Tigers; the most among any Tigers pitcher in history.

Wakabayashi doubled as a manager and player throughout the 1940s, and joined the Pacific League Mainichi Orions in 1950, when the modern two-league system of Japanese baseball was established. He was already 42 years old at this time, and no longer had the energy to spend the entire season as a player, but still pitched in the first game of the Japan Series against the Shochiku Robins, contributing to the Orions series championship in 1950. He also pitched a shut-out game against the Kintetsu Pearls in November, 1950, setting the Japanese record for the oldest pitcher to record a shut-out win. This record lasted for almost 60 years until Masahiro Yamamoto broke it in 2010 at the age of 45. Wakabayashi announced his retirement in 1953, and he pitched his last professional game that year to mark his 1000th strikeout. He managed to reach the landmark, but handed his team the loss in the process.

Though much of his success as a player came before modern Japanese baseball was established in 1950, he is still recognized as one of the legendary pitchers in Japanese baseball. He won the league MVP award in 1944 and 1947, and was inducted into the Japanese baseball hall of fame in 1964.

=== Post-playing career ===
After retiring, he was given a position in the Mainichi franchise, but left after only one year to become a coach for the Tombow Unions. He worked as a pitching coach for the Taiyo Whales, and became the head coach for the Nishitetsu Lions in 1963. He was diagnosed with stomach cancer in 1964, and left the Lions that year. He died on March 5, 1965, at age 57.

== Cultural impact ==
When the Osaka Tigers played their first season in 1936, jersey numbers were given out in alphabetical order. Wakabayashi was assigned number 4, but he refused to wear the number because it is considered unlucky in Japan. He was given the first available number instead, which was 18. His subsequent success in the professional leagues made it a custom for a Japanese team's ace pitcher to be given the number — for example, Daisuke Matsuzaka was given number 18 when he joined the Seibu Lions from high school.

Wakabayashi's voluntary services and contributions to the community, including efforts to encourage and impact children through his founding of the Tigers Children's Club, publication of children's baseball magazines, visits to the juvenile detention centers and orphanage, led to the establishment of an Annual Tadashi Wakabayashi Award in 2011. The award is considered the "MVP outside of the baseball field" and recognizes one Hanshin Tigers' athlete each year who has demonstrated exceptional and sustained social and community services.

Awards
Preceded by Shosei Go; Kazuto Yamamoto	Japanese Baseball League MVP; 1944; 1947	Succeeded by Kazuto Yamamoto; Kazuto Yamamoto
