= Harris McGalliard =

American baseball player

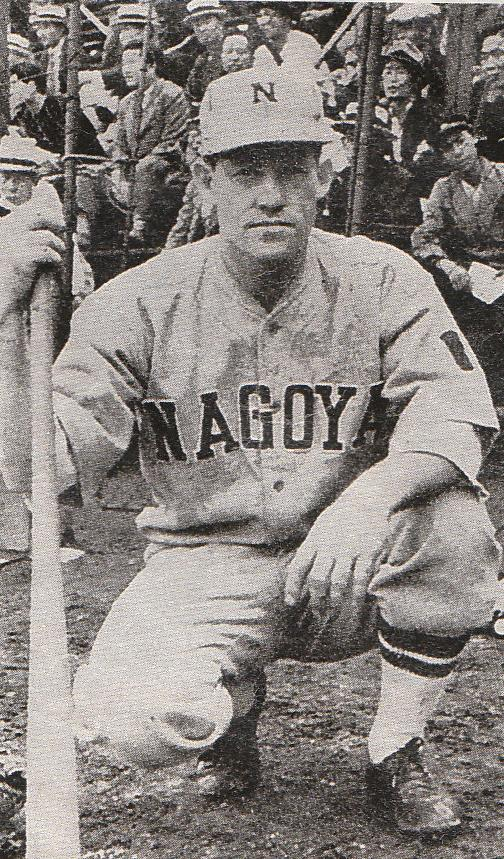
- Catcher
- Born: September 25, 1906; Los Angeles, California
- Died: May 26, 1978 (aged 71); Las Vegas, Nevada
- Batted: Right Threw: Right

JBL debut
- 1936, for the Nagoya Kinko

Last JBL appearance
- 1938, for the Korakuen Eagles

JBL statistics
- Batting average: .309
- Home runs: 13
- RBI: 103
- Stats at Baseball Reference

Teams
- Nagoya Kinko (1936); Korakuen Eagles (1937–1938)

Career highlights and awards
- 1937 Japanese Baseball League Most Valuable Player Award (Fall)

Andrew Harris McGalliard (September 25, 1906 – May 26, 1978), better known as Bucky Harris, was an American businessman and professional baseball player. He played in the Japanese Baseball League from 1936 to 1938. While playing for the Korakuen Eagles in the fall of 1937, he won the Japanese Baseball League Most Valuable Player Award.

== Early life ==
McGalliard was born in Los Angeles, the son of Joseph W. McGalliard and Sarah C. Baker McGalliard.

== Career ==
=== Sports ===
McGalliard was a catcher for the Sacramento Solons of the Pacific Coast League from 1928 to 1929, and for the Wichita Aviators in 1930. From 1931 to 1935 he was catcher for the Los Angeles Nippons, a semi-professional team of mostly Japanese-American players that toured in Japan.

McGalliard played professional baseball in Japan in the 1930s, under the name Bucky Harris. As a member of the Korakuen Eagles in 1937, he was awarded Most Valuable Player in the Japanese Baseball League. He returned to the United States in 1938. He managed a Little League team in the San Fernando Valley in the 1950s. In 1976 he was a special guest at the Japanese World Series.

In 1935, McGalliard organized the first aquaplane race from Hermosa Beach to Catalina Island. Later in life he was an active golfer and sports fisherman.

=== War ===
During World War II, McGalliard used his knowledge of Japanese, with further training at the Army Intelligence Language School in Michigan, to work for the United States Army in Leyte, interviewing Japanese prisoners of war. He achieved the rank of captain.

=== Business ===
McGalliard was a charter member of the Junior Chamber of Commerce in Hermosa Beach. He co-owned a masonry business in Inglewood. As one of the partners in Mamie, Inc., McGalliard owned land in Hermosa Beach and sought to build a high-rise apartment building on the site in the early 1960s.

== Personal life ==
McGalliard married Collece Mae Leggett, and had a daughter, also named Collece. He lived in Costa Mesa and Palm Desert.

== See also ==
- American expatriate baseball players in Japan

Awards
Preceded by Eiji Sawamura	Japanese Baseball League MVP; 1937 (Fall)	Succeeded by Hisanori Karita
