= Ralph Bryant =

American baseball player (born 1961)

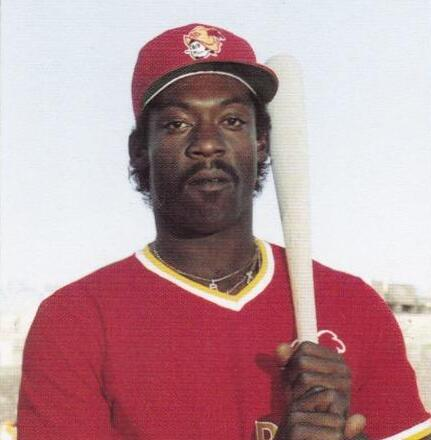
- Bryant with the Albuquerque Dukes c. 1987
- Outfielder
- Born: May 20, 1961 (age 65); Fort Gaines, Georgia, U.S.
- Batted: Left Threw: Right

Professional debut
- MLB: September 8, 1985, for the Los Angeles Dodgers
- NPB: June 29, 1988, for the Kintetsu Buffaloes

Last appearance
- MLB: October 4, 1987, for the Los Angeles Dodgers
- NPB: June 11, 1995, for the Kintetsu Buffaloes

MLB statistics
- Batting average: .253
- Home runs: 8
- Runs batted in: 24

NPB statistics
- Batting average: .261
- Home runs: 259
- Runs batted in: 641
- Stats at Baseball Reference

Teams
- Los Angeles Dodgers (1985–1987); Kintetsu Buffaloes (1988–1995)

Career highlights and awards
- Pacific League MVP (1989); 3× Pacific League home run leader (1989, 1993, 1994); Pacific League RBI leader (1993)

Ralph Wendell Bryant (born May 20, 1961) is an American former Major League Baseball player. He played with the Los Angeles Dodgers in the major leagues, and with the Chunichi Dragons and Kintetsu Buffaloes in Nippon Professional Baseball. He batted left-handed, threw right-handed, and played outfield for most of his career.

== Career ==
Born in Fort Gaines, Georgia, Bryant studied at Abraham Baldwin Agricultural College. He was drafted in the first round of the 1981 amateur draft by the Los Angeles Dodgers, having previously been drafted by the Dodgers and Minnesota Twins, but did not sign with either team that year.

Bryant was promoted to the major leagues for the first time in 1985, but was unable to establish himself as a regular outfielder, and spent the next three years traveling back and forth between the major and minor leagues. In 1988, the Chunichi Dragons of the Japanese Central League showed interest in Bryant, and he was shipped to Japan in May, 1988.

On June 7, 1988, Dick Davis, the cleanup batter of the Kintetsu Buffaloes, was arrested on drug charges, and the Buffaloes were forced to let go of one of their best hitters mid-season. Unable to fill the offensive void left by Davis, the Buffaloes found Bryant, who was playing on the Dragons minor league team. After seeing Bryant blast a home run in a minor league game, the Buffaloes offered to purchase his contract. The Dragons minor league staff was opposed to the trade, but regulations allowed for only two non-Japanese players per team, and the Dragons already had Taiwanese baseball star Genji Kaku and slugger Gary Rajsich on their roster, leaving no room for Bryant. The purchase was finalized on June 28, giving birth to one of the best left-handed power hitters in Japanese baseball history.

Bryant quickly established his presence with the Buffaloes, hitting 34 home runs in only 74 games to contribute to their huge comeback which put the team in a close second place to the Seibu Lions in 1988. Ironically, many Buffaloes home games that year were held in the Nagoya Baseball Stadium, the home field of the Chunichi Dragons.

Bryant played his best season in 1989, where his 49 home runs led the Buffaloes to their third Pacific League championship. That 49 home run season would be a Buffaloes franchise record until Tuffy Rhodes tied Sadaharu Oh's record of 55 in 2001. He won the season MVP award that year and also tied Sadaharu Oh's career record for hitting 3 home runs in a game 5 times. The Buffaloes reached the 1989 Japan Series that year for the first and only time in Bryant's career. However, they would fall in a reverse sweep by the Yomiuri Giants and Central League MVP, fellow foreigner Warren Cromartie. Bryant hit just one home run in the series. He continued his success in subsequent seasons and retired in 1995 after missing most of that year due to injuries. He was invited back to Japan in 2005 by manager Akira Ogi as a hitting coach for the Orix Buffaloes. He left this job after only one year but blasted three home runs in an inter-league home run contest during the season.

Though he hit a large number of home runs throughout his career, he also struck out countless times, and holds the top four spots on the single-season strikeout records in Nippon Professional Baseball.
