= Shigeru Mizuhara =

Japanese baseball player and manager

Shigeru Mizuhara 水原 茂
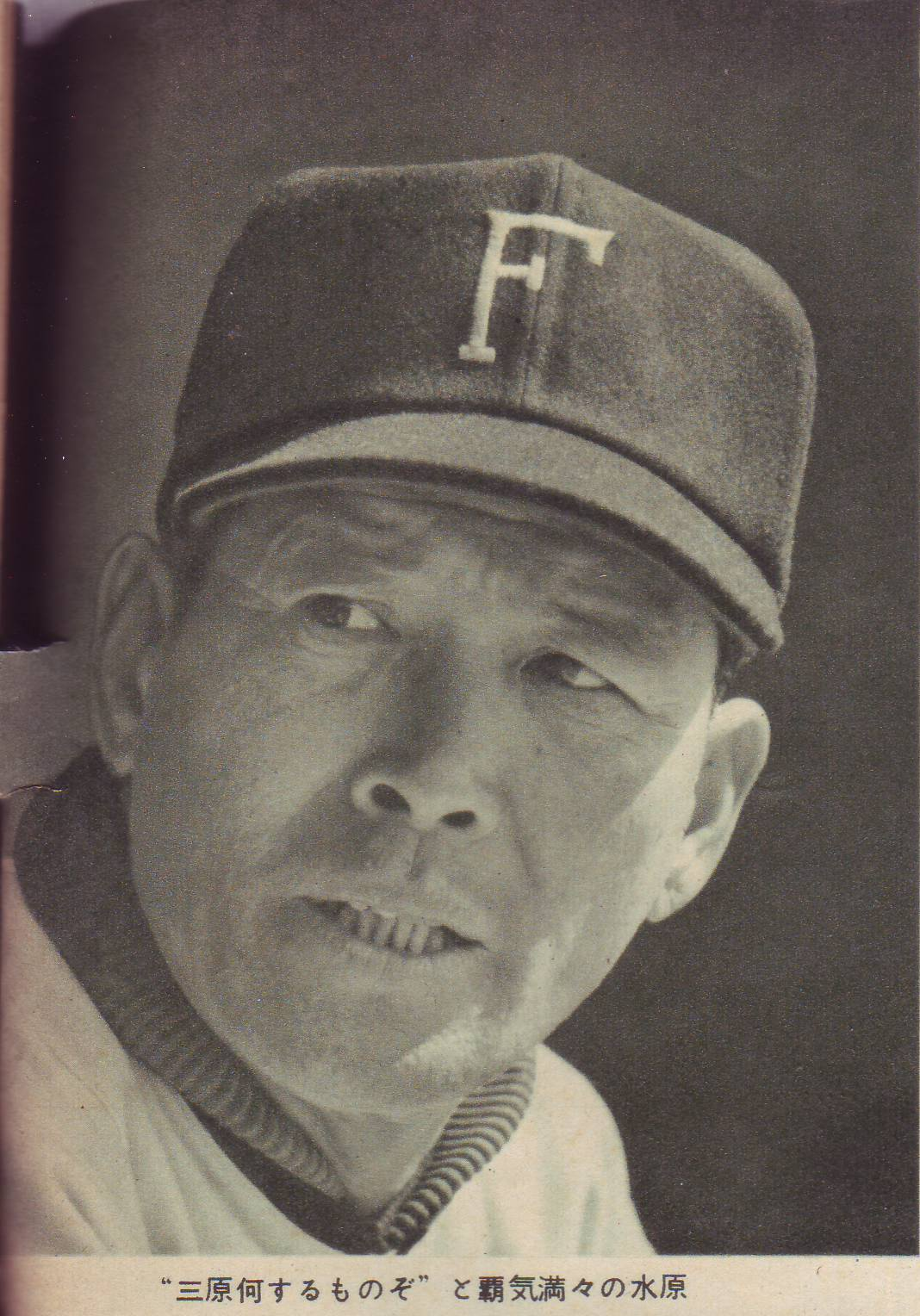
- Infielder / Manager
- Born: January 19, 1909; Takamatsu, Kagawa, Japan
- Died: March 26, 1982 (aged 73); Tokyo, Japan
- Batted: Right Threw: Right

JBL debut
- 1936, for the Tokyo Giants

Last NPB appearance
- 1950, for the Yomiuri Giants

JBL/NPB statistics
- Batting average: .243
- Home runs: 12
- Hits: 476
- RBIs: 184
- Stolen bases: 69

Teams
- As player: Tokyo Giants/Yomiuri Giants (1936–1950); As manager: Yomiuri Giants (1950–1960); Toei Flyers (1961–1967); Chunichi Dragons (1969–1971)

Career highlights and awards
- As player: Japanese Baseball League MVP (1942); 9x JBL champion (1936, 1937, 1938, 1939, 1940, 1941, 1942, 1943, 1949); Best Nine Award (1940); As manager: 5x Japan Series champion (1951–1953, 1955, 1962)

Member of the Japanese

Baseball Hall of Fame
- Induction: 1977
- Election method: Selection Committee for the Players

Shigeru Mizuhara (水原 茂, Mizuhara Shigeru; January 19, 1909 – March 26, 1982) is a former professional baseball infielder and manager in Japan's Japanese Baseball League (JBL) and Nippon Professional Baseball (NPB). As a player his team won nine JBL championships; as a manager his teams won five Japan Series championships.

Mizuhara was a star third baseman for Keio University.

Mizuhara played his entire professional career for the Tokyo Giants/Tokyo Kyojin/Yomiuri Giants, from the Japanese Baseball League's beginnings in 1936 until 1950. In 1940, he was selected as one of the Best Nine Award for the JBL. Playing second base for Tokyo in 1942, Mizuhara was voted Most Valuable Player of the JBL. Mizuhara served in the Japanese military during World War II, eventually being captured by the Russians; while in the prisoner of war camp, he introduced baseball to his captors.

The JBL reorganized to Nippon Professional Baseball in 1950, and Mizhuara became player-manager of the Giants (although he retired as a player after the season). As manager for the Giants from 1950 to 1960, the Toei Flyers from 1961 to 1967, and the Chunichi Dragons from 1969 to 1971, Mizuhara compiled a record of 1586–1123, for a .585 winning percentage. As manager, he guided his teams to five Japan Series championships, four of those with Yomiuri and one with Toei.

Mizuhara was elected to the Japanese Baseball Hall of Fame in 1977.

Awards
Preceded by Tetsuharu Kawakami	Japanese Baseball League MVP; 1942	Succeeded by Shosei Go
