= Shosei Go =

Taiwanese baseball player

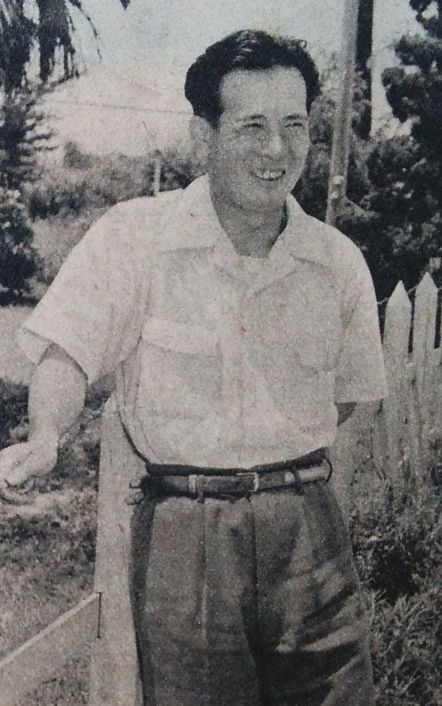
- Outfielder, Pitcher
- Born: Chinese and Japanese: 吳波; pinyin: Wu Bo; rōmaji: Go Ha; June 28, 1916; Taiwan
- Died: June 7, 1987 (aged 70)
- Batted: Left Threw: Left

Japanese Baseball League debut
- 1937, for the Tokyo Kyojin

Last JBL/NPB appearance
- 1957, for the Mainichi Orions

Career hitting statistics
- Batting average: .272
- Hits: 1,326
- Runs batted in: 389
- Stolen bases: 381
- Win–loss record: 15–7
- Earned run average: 3.48
- Strikeouts: 66
- Stats at Baseball Reference

Teams
- As player: Tokyo Kyojin (1937–1943); Hanshin/Osaka Tigers (1944–1949); Mainichi Orions (1950–1957)

Career highlights and awards
- Japanese Baseball League MVP (1943); Pitched a no-hitter on June 16, 1946; Japan Series champion (1950)

Member of the Japanese

Baseball Hall of Fame
- Induction: 1995 (elected by the Special Committee)

Shosei Go (Chinese: 吳昌征; pinyin: Wú Chāngzhēng; Pe̍h-ōe-jī: Gô͘ Chhiong-cheng; Japanese: Go Shōsei; June 28, 1916 – June 7, 1987) was a Taiwanese two-way baseball player who played for the Tokyo Giants (1937–1943, now the Yomiuri Giants), Hanshin Tigers (1944–1949) and Mainichi Orions (1950–1957, now the Chiba Lotte Marines). Only 5-foot-6 and 140 pounds, he was nicknamed "The Human Locomotive" due to his speed. As a left-handed outfielder, he won two batting titles and a stolen base title.

As a pitcher, the bulk of his appearances were in 1946, when he went 14-6 with a 3.03 ERA and 16 complete games. Go also threw the first postwar no-hitter, against the Tokyo Senators in 1946. He hit the first ever home run in a Japan Series, doing so in Game 2 on November 23, 1950.

== Early life ==
Go, born Wu Bo (Chinese: 吳波, played on the Kano baseball team and participated in the National High School Baseball Invitational Tournament in 1935 and 1936. After graduating from Kagi, he signed with the Tokyo Giants.

== See also ==
- Japanese Baseball Hall of Fame
- Sports in Taiwan

Awards
| Preceded by Shigeru Mizuhara | Japanese Baseball League MVP; 1943 | Succeeded by Tadashi Wakabayashi |
