= Japanese Baseball League =

Professional baseball league from 1936 to 1949

- Formerly: Japan Occupational Baseball League
- Sport: Baseball
- Founded: February 5, 1936
- First season: September 1936
- Folded: November 26, 1949 (reorganized as Nippon Professional Baseball)
- President: Jiro Morioka
- No. of teams: 11 (overall); 8 at time of reorganization as NPB
- Country: Japan
- Last champion: Tokyo Kyojin / Yomiuri Giants
- Most titles: Tokyo Kyojin / Yomiuri Giants (9 titles)

The Japanese Baseball League (日本野球連盟, Nihon Yakyū Renmei) was a professional baseball league in Japan which operated from 1936 to 1949, before reorganizing in 1950 as Nippon Professional Baseball.

The league's dominant team was Tokyo Kyojin (renamed the Yomiuri Giants in 1947), which won nine league championships, including six in a row from 1938 to 1943, when many of Japan's best players were serving in the Imperial Japanese Army.

Standout players from the Japanese Baseball League era included Haruyasu Nakajima, Tetsuharu Kawakami, and Kazuto Tsuruoka; pitchers Hideo Fujimoto, Eiji Sawamura, Victor Starffin, and Tadashi Wakabayashi; and two-way players Fumio Fujimura, Shosei Go, Masaru Kageura, and Jiro Noguchi.

== League structure ==
Unlike American pro teams, Japanese Baseball League teams were usually named after their corporate owners/sponsors rather than the cities or regions in which they played. This was because Japanese franchising does not have strong territorial requirements as in the Major Leagues; as a result, the JBL teams clustered in metropolitan areas in Japan's center (Tokyo, Nagoya) and south (Osaka). As a result, teams were notorious for how often they changed their names, often because of changes in ownership/sponsorship (and also because of nationalistic regulations imposed during wartime, such as the outlawing of English team names). (The Yomiuri Giants, the Chunichi Dragons, and the Hanshin Tigers are the only surviving major clubs that have always been based in their respective cities. Additionally, the current Orix Buffaloes are a merger of two clubs which never left their hometowns.)

Most Japanese Baseball League teams did not have an "official" home stadium; instead, teams played at any stadium in the area in which they were based. All league championships went to whoever had the best record at the end of the season, without a postseason series being played.

== History ==
The league was established on February 5, 1936, as the Japan Occupational Baseball League, with an initial complement of seven teams. Three of the teams were based in Tokyo, two in Osaka, and two in Nagoya.

Due to a lack of position players, a number of players in the league both pitched and batted. At first (until after World War II), the JBL was a "dead ball" league, due to Japan conserving rubber (including inside baseballs) for its war efforts; instead it used Balatá inside the balls. Initially, the league played split seasons, doing so from 1936 to 1938. In the debut 1936 season, it split into spring, summer, and fall seasons, only keeping track of the standings in the fall season. The league played spring and fall seasons in 1937 (approximartely a 100-game schedule in total) and 1938 (total 75-game schedule), adding one new team each year.

The league was renamed the Japanese Baseball League in 1939, playing a 96-game schedule. Before the 1940 season, one of the founding teams, Nagoya Kinko (originally the Nagoya Golden Dolphins), merged with the Tokyo Senators. The 1940 season featured a 104-game schedule.

In October 1940 (responding to rising hostility toward the West due to World War II), the league outlawed the use of English in Japanese baseball. In response, the Korakuen Eagles became "Kurowashi", the Osaka Tigers became "Hanshin", the Tokyo Senators became "Tsubasa", and (eventually) Lion became "Asahi".

In 1941, the JBL appointed its first president, Jiro Morioka (formerly VP of Dai Tokyo). Morioka negotiated with the Japanese Imperial Army to keep professional baseball going through the early years of the Second World War.

The league played a 90-game schedule in 1941, a 104-game schedule in 1942, and an 84-game schedule in 1943.

Two Tokyo-based teams dissolved before the 1944 season: the Yamato Baseball Club (originally the Korakuen Eagles) and the Nishitetsu Baseball Club (originally the Tokyo Senators).

Due to the Pacific War, the 1944 season was truncated to about 35 games, and the 1945 season was skipped entirely. Many players enlisted in the Japanese Imperial Army, with 72 of them losing their lives in the war.

The league restarted on November 6, 1945, and a full season of 105 games was played the next year, with two new teams (both based in Tokyo) joining the league. One of the new teams, Gold Star, was owned by textile manufacturer Komajiro Tamura, who also owned Pacific (formerly Asahi).

A rival four-team league, known as the Kokumin League (国民リーグ, Kokumin Riigu), played a 30-game summer season in 1947. Unable to compete against the more established JBL, however, the Kokumin League disbanded a few games into the 1947 fall season.

The Japanese Baseball League played a 119-game schedule in 1947. That year, baseball personality Sōtaro Suzuki proposed that JBL teams should have pet names like the Yomiuri Giants', whose pet name was "Kyojin", and names such as the Osaka Tigers' alias "Mouko" (fierce tiger), the revived Tokyo Senators' "Seito" (bluestockings) and the Pacific's "Taihei" (tranquility, also "Pacific" as in "Pacific Ocean"') began to be used by the press. However, some teams rejected the use of these pet names, so they were never fully adopted. The 1948 season had a 140-game schedule, and the 1949 season had a 134-game schedule.

After the 1949 season, the league reorganized into today's Nippon Professional Baseball (NPB). The four earliest-established clubs formerly in the Japanese Baseball League were placed in NPB's Central League, while the four later surviving franchises went to the Pacific League.

== Foreign players ==
Victor Starffin, an ethnic Russian pitcher, was a dominant player of the era and the first professional pitcher in Japan to win 300 games.

Shosei Go, nicknamed "The Human Locomotive", was a speedy player from Taiwan who played in the league for the Kyojin and the Tigers. He won the 1943 JBL Most Valuable Player award as a member of the champion Kyojin. Hiroshi Oshita was another Taiwanese player who starred in the JBL. From 1946 to 1949 he played for the Tokyo Senators/Tokyu Flyers. (After reorganization, Oshita stayed with the Flyers until 1951, and then moved to the Nishitetsu Lions, finishing his Japanese professional career with a .303 lifetime batting average, 201 home runs, and 861 RBI.)

Harris McGalliard (Japan's "Bucky Harris"), Herbert "Buster" North, and James E. Bonner ("Jimmy Bonna") became the first Americans to play in Japan's professional baseball league in 1936. (Bonner was African-American, thus beating Jackie Robinson to professional baseball 11 years before Robinson broke in with the Brooklyn Dodgers.) They were joined by the Japanese-American players Kiyomi "Slim" Hirakawa, Fumito "Jimmy" Horio, Kazuyoshi "George" Matsuura, Yoshio "Sam" Takahashi, and Tadashi "Bozo" Wakabayashi.

== Teams ==
Original name	City	Founded	Subsequent names	Current name/status	NPB league
Dai Tokyo	Tokyo	1936	* Lion Baseball Club (1937–1940) * Asahi Baseball Club (1941–1944) * Pacific Baseball Club (1946) * Taiyō Robins (1947–1952)	Yokohama DeNA BayStars (2012-present), relocated in 1978 from Kawasaki	Central League
Nagoya Baseball Club	Nagoya	1936	* Sangyo Baseball Club (1944) * Chubu Nippon (1946) * Chubu Nippon Dragons (1947–1953)	Chunichi Dragons (1954–present)	Central League
Nagoya Golden Dolphins	Nagoya	1936	Nagoya Kinko (1937–1939)	Merged with the Tokyo Senators (1940; dissolved 1944)	N.A.
Osaka Tigers	Osaka (1936–1940; 1946–1949); Nishinomiya (1940–1944)	1936	* Hanshin Baseball Club (September 25, 1940–1944) * Osaka Tigers (1946–1960, nicknamed "Hanshin")	Hanshin Tigers (1961–present)	Central League
Tokyo Kyojin	Tokyo	1936	* Yomiuri Giants (1947–present)	Yomiuri Giants (1947–present)	Central League
Tokyo Senators	Tokyo	1936	* Tsubasa Baseball Club (1940) * Taiyō Baseball Club (1941–1942) * Nishitetsu Baseball Club (1943)	Dissolved (1944)	N.A.
Hankyu Baseball Club	Osaka	1936	* Hankyu Bears (January–April 1947) * Hankyu Braves (April 1947 – 1988)	Orix Buffaloes (2005–present)	Pacific League
Korakuen Eagles	Tokyo	1937	* Eagles Baseball Club (1938–1939) * Kurowashi Black Eagles (1940–1942) * Yamato Baseball Club (1942–1943)	Dissolved (1944)	N.A.
Nankai Baseball Club	Osaka	1938	* Kinki Nippon (June 1–December 31, 1944) * Great Ring (1946–May 31, 1947) * Nankai Hawks (June 1, 1947 – 1988)	Fukuoka SoftBank Hawks (2005–present), relocated in 1988	Pacific League
Gold Star	Tokyo	1946	* Kinsei Stars (1947–1948) * Daiei Stars (1949–1957)	Chiba Lotte Marines (1992–present) relocated in 1992	Pacific League
Senators Baseball Club	Tokyo	1946	* Tokyu Flyers (1947) * Kyuei Flyers (1948) * Tokyu Flyers (1949–1954)	Hokkaido Nippon-Ham Fighters (1974–present) relocated in 2004 to Sapporo	Pacific League

== MVPs ==
- 1937 (spring): Eiji Sawamura, Tokyo Kyojin, P
- 1937 (fall): Harris McGalliard, Korakuen Eagles, C
- 1938 (spring): Hisanori Karita, Tokyo Senators, 2B
- 1938 (fall): Haruyasu Nakajima, Tokyo Kyojin, OF
- 1939: Victor Starffin, Tokyo Kyojin, P
- 1940: Victor Starffin, Tokyo Kyojin, P
- 1941: Tetsuharu Kawakami, Tokyo Kyojin, 1B
- 1942: Shigeru Mizuhara, Tokyo Kyojin, 2B
- 1943: Shosei Go, Tokyo Kyojin, OF
- 1944: Tadashi Wakabayashi, Hanshin, P
- 1945: No league play because of World War II
- 1946: Kazuto Tsuruoka, Kinki Great Ring, 3B
- 1947: Tadashi Wakabayashi, Osaka Tigers, P
- 1948: Kazuto Tsuruoka, Nankai, 3B
- 1949: Fumio Fujimura, Osaka Tigers, 3B

== Season-by-season standings ==
Season champion in bold. (Note: The JBL's inaugural season of 1936 included a Fall playoff between the top two teams, the Osaka Tigers and the Tokyo Kyojin. The Kyojin won the series two games-to-one to be declared champions.)

Year	Half-season	1	2	3	4	5	6	7	8	9
1936	Spring	No standings								
1936	Summer	No standings								
1936	Fall	Osaka Tigers	**Tokyo Kyojin**	Hankyu Baseball Club	Nagoya Baseball Club	Tokyo Senators	Nagoya Golden Dolphins	Dai Tokyo		
1937	Spring	**Tokyo Kyojin**	Osaka Tigers	Tokyo Senators	Hankyu	Nagoya Kinko	Dai Tokyo	Nagoya	Korakuen Eagles	
1937	Fall	**Osaka Tigers**	Tokyo Kyojin	Korakuen Eagles	Nagoya Kinko	Tokyo Senators	Lion Baseball Club	Hankyu	Nagoya	
1938	Spring	**Osaka Tigers**	Tokyo Kyojin	Hankyu	Korakuen Eagles	Tokyo Senators	Nagoya Kinko	Nagoya	Lion	
1938	Fall	**Tokyo Kyojin**	Osaka Tigers	Hankyu	Nagoya	Lion	Tokyo Senators	Korakuen Eagles	Nankai Baseball Club	Nagoya Kinko
1939		**Tokyo Kyojin**	Osaka Tigers	Hankyu	Tokyo Senators	Nankai	Nagoya	Nagoya Kinko	Lion	Korakuen Eagles
1940		**Tokyo Kyojin**	Hanshin Tigers	Hankyu	Tsubasa Baseball Club	Nagoya	Kurowashi	Nagoya Kinko	Nankai	Lion
1941		**Tokyo Kyojin**	Hankyu	Taiyō Baseball Club	Nankai	Hanshin Tigers	Nagoya	Kurowashi	Asahi Baseball Club	
1942		**Tokyo Kyojin**	Taiyō	Hanshin Tigers	Asahi	Hankyu	Nankai	Nagoya	Yamato Baseball Club	
1943		**Tokyo Kyojin**	Nagoya	Asahi	Hanshin Tigers	Nishitetsu Baseball Club	Yamato	Hankyu	Nankai	
1944		**Hanshin Tigers**	Tokyo Kyojin	Hankyu	Sangyo Baseball Club	Asahi	Kinki Nippon			
1945		No league play because of World War II								
1946		**Kinki Great Ring**	Tokyo Kyojin	Osaka Tigers	Hankyu	Senators Baseball Club	Gold Star	Chubu Nippon	Pacific Baseball Club	
1947		**Osaka Tigers**	Chunichi Dragons	Nankai Hawks	Hankyu Braves	Yomiuri Giants	Tokyu Flyers	Taiyō Robins	Kinsei Stars	
1948		**Nankai Hawks**	Yomiuri Giants	Osaka Tigers	Hankyu Braves	Kyuei Flyers	Taiyō Robins	Kinsei Stars	Chunichi Dragons	
1949		**Yomiuri Giants**	Hankyu Braves	Daiei Stars	Nankai Hawks	Chunichi Dragons	Osaka Tigers	Tokyu Flyers	Taiyō Robins	

=== Champion managers ===
Year	Champion	Manager
1937 Spring	Kyojin	Sadayoshi Fujimoto
1937 Fall	Tigers	Shuichi Ishimoto
1938 Spring	Tigers	Shuichi Ishimoto
1938 Fall	Kyojin	Sadayoshi Fujimoto
1939	Kyojin	Sadayoshi Fujimoto
1940	Kyojin	Sadayoshi Fujimoto
1941	Kyojin	Sadayoshi Fujimoto
1942	Kyojin	Sadayoshi Fujimoto
1943	Kyojin	Sadayoshi Fujimoto
1944	Tigers	Tadashi Wakabayashi
1945	NONE	SEASON SUSPENDED
1946	Kinki Great Ring	Kazuto Tsuruoka
1947	Tigers	Tadashi Wakabayashi
1948	Hawks	Kazuto Tsuruoka
1949	Giants	Osamu Mihara
