= Tsuyoshi Shinjo =

Japanese baseball player (born 1972)

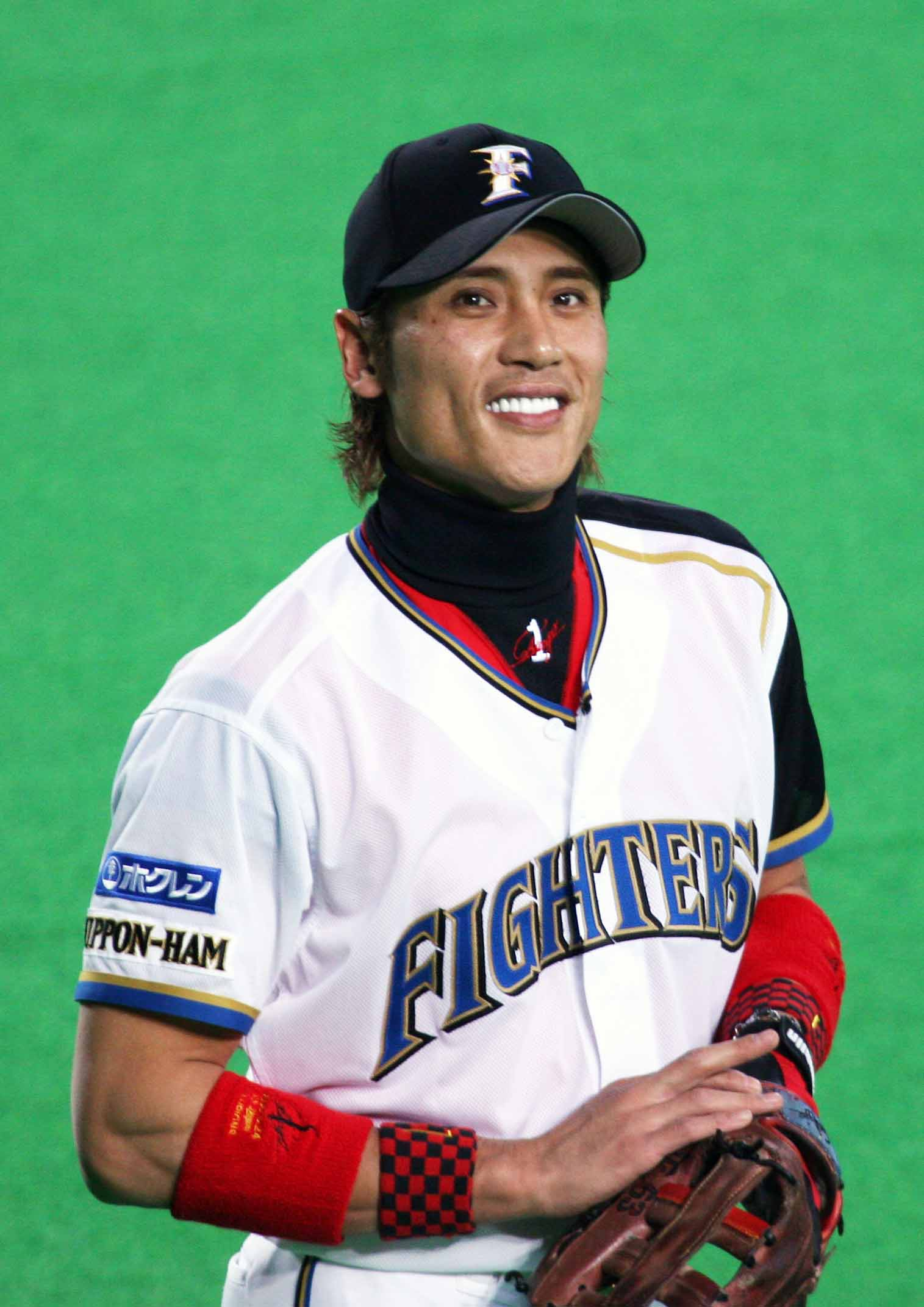
- Tsuyoshi Shinjo in 2006

Hokkaido Nippon-Ham Fighters – No. 1
- Outfielder / Manager
- Born: January 28, 1972 (age 54); Tsushima, Nagasaki Prefecture, Japan
- Batted: Right Threw: Right

Professional debut
- NPB: September 10, 1991, for the Hanshin Tigers
- MLB: April 3, 2001, for the New York Mets

Last appearance
- MLB: June 27, 2003, for the New York Mets
- NPB: October 26, 2006, for the Hokkaido Nippon-Ham Fighters

NPB statistics
- Batting average: .254
- Home runs: 205
- Runs batted in: 716

MLB statistics
- Batting average: .245
- Home runs: 20
- Runs batted in: 100
- Stats at Baseball Reference

Teams
- As player: Hanshin Tigers (1991–2000); New York Mets (2001); San Francisco Giants (2002); New York Mets (2003); Hokkaido Nippon-Ham Fighters (2004–2006); As manager: Hokkaido Nippon-Ham Fighters (2022–)

Career highlights and awards
- 7× NPB All-Star (1994, 1997, 1999, 2000, 2004–2006); 3× Best Nine Award (1993, 2000, 2004); 10× Golden Glove Award (1993, 1994, 1996–2000, 2004–2006); Japan Series champion (2006)

Tsuyoshi Shinjo (新庄 剛志, Shinjō Tsuyoshi; January 28, 1972), also known during the 2022 Nippon Professional Baseball season as BIGBOSS (ビッグボス, Biggubosu), is a former Japanese professional baseball outfielder and the current manager for the Hokkaido Nippon-Ham Fighters of Nippon Professional Baseball (NPB).

Shinjo began his playing career with the Hanshin Tigers, and moved to the United States to play in Major League Baseball (MLB) for the New York Mets. He is the second Japanese-born position player to play an MLB game, as well as the first in the National League. In 2002, he joined the San Francisco Giants and was the first Japanese-born player to appear in the World Series. He had a second stint with the Mets in 2003, and returned to Japan to play for the Hokkaido Nippon-Ham Fighters, with whom he won the Japan Series in his final season.

== Career ==
Born in Tsushima, Nagasaki Prefecture, Japan and raised in Minami-ku, Fukuoka, he played for the Hanshin Tigers in Japan from 1990 until 2000, then for Major League Baseball's New York Mets and San Francisco Giants. In 2002, he became the first Japan-born player to play in the World Series, where he went 1 for 6 with three strikeouts. He ended his three-year stint in American baseball by being demoted to AAA after hitting .193 for the first half of the 2003 season. He returned to Japan and played for the Hokkaido Nippon Ham Fighters from 2004 until 2006. He is known for his flamboyance, colorful wristbands, dyed hair, and a unique hop as he catches the ball. His uniqueness has endeared him to baseball fans and has made him one of the most popular players in the Japanese leagues despite not being in the echelon of elite active players. In fact, his popularity was what kept him off the bench during his stint with the Tigers when manager Katsuya Nomura tried to turn him into a pitcher in the rotation rather than risk his team with his mediocre play.

Shinjo ended his career in storybook fashion. Playing for years on losing teams in Hanshin and despite playing in the 2002 World Series alongside Giants legend Barry Bonds, Shinjo showed emotion and shed tears as his final game crowned him a champion, as he was a member of the Fighters squad that won their first Japan Series title since 1962 with a 4 games to 1 series win over the Chunichi Dragons. As Shinjo took the field for the top of the ninth inning in the final game, he was given a standing ovation from the home crowd. Before the inning began, he was visibly emotional. Although the final play was only close to him, (left fielder Hichori Morimoto caught the final ball) the cameras showed only Shinjo's dramatic reaction. Traditionally, the players toss the manager in the air for series wins first, but the players tossed Shinjo in the air first instead of manager Trey Hillman.

Shinjo is now a television celebrity in Japan as well as a model for his own line of clothing. He has also won the maximum 10,000,000 JPY prize in a celebrity edition of the Japanese version of Who Wants to Be a Millionaire, Kuizu $ Mirionea.

In October 2021, the Hokkaido Nippon-Ham Fighters announced that Shinjo would be the manager for the upcoming season. With his hiring, this gave him the nickname, "Big Boss" or "Big Boss Shinjo" by fans, due to his celebrity status and his fun, over the top, unorthodox clubhouse atmosphere. He was also hired by the Fighters to replace longtime manager Hideki Kuriyama, who became the manager of Samurai Japan at the end of the season. The success of the nickname led him to register himself as BIGBOSS, and on March 24, 2022, just a few days before Opening Day, NPB officially approved BIGBOSS as his registered name for the 2022 season.

During the 2022 season, Shinjo became well known for entering the field in a home game against the Saitama Seibu Lions in a hoverbike. He also entered his first ever home game as manager, as SB Nation described it, "straight out of wrestling". He also showed up to spring training in a three-wheeled motorcycle. He also has his own jersey, with his registered name replacing the nameplate of the Fighters.

When the club made the jump to Es Con Field Hokkaido, Shinjo announced the partial retirement of his "Big Boss" moniker at the club's final game against the Chiba Lotte Marines at the Sapporo Dome. He also designed a new alternate uniform for the Fighters, known as "New Age Games" (officially known as "NEW AGE GAMES produced by SHINJO"). These jerseys used a black, red, and gold color scheme with a V on the center, standing for victory. Some fans, mostly Americans, had noticed its similarity to the Vancouver Canucks' infamous Flying V jerseys from the 1980s.

== MLB stats ==
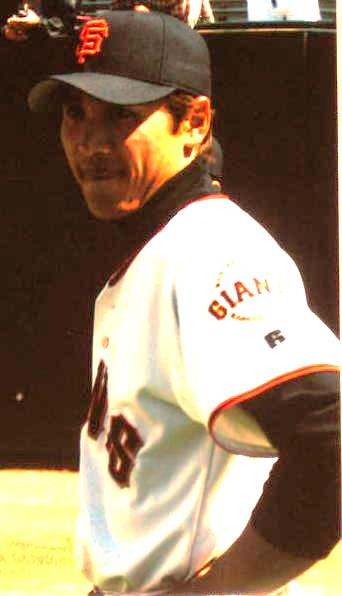
Tsuyoshi Shinjo in 2002

SEASON	TEAM	G	AB	R	H	2B	3B	HR	RBI	BB	SO	SB	CS	AVG	OBP	SLG	OPS
2001	NYM	123	400	46	107	23	1	10	56	25	70	4	5	.268	.320	.405	.725
2002	SF	118	362	42	86	15	3	9	37	24	46	5	0	.238	.294	.370	.664
2003	NYM	62	114	10	22	3	0	1	7	6	12	0	1	.193	.238	.246	.484
Total	---	303	876	98	215	41	4	20	100	55	128	9	6	.245	.299	.370	.669

== Japanese baseball stats ==
SEASON	TEAM	G	AB	R	H	2B	3B	HR	RBI	BB	SO	SB	CS	AVG	SLG	OBP	OPS
1991	T	13	17	1	2	0	0	0	1	0	3	0	0	.118	.118	.118	.236
1992	T	95	353	39	98	16	3	11	46	18	73	5	2	.278	.433	.320	.753
1993	T	102	408	50	105	13	1	23	62	20	91	13	2	.257	.463	.305	.768
1994	T	122	466	54	117	23	7	17	68	30	93	7	5	.251	.440	.304	.744
1995	T	87	311	34	70	15	3	7	37	26	76	6	4	.225	.360	.294	.654
1996	T	113	408	55	97	16	4	19	66	55	106	2	2	.238	.436	.335	.771
1997	T	136	482	62	112	17	3	20	68	44	120	8	4	.232	.405	.306	.711
1998	T	132	414	39	92	21	3	6	27	25	65	1	2	.222	.331	.275	.606
1999	T	123	471	53	120	21	7	14	58	23	72	8	2	.255	.418	.303	.721
2000	T	131	511	71	142	23	1	28	85	32	93	15	6	.278	.491	.321	.812
2004	F	123	504	88	150	28	3	24	79	15	58	1	3	.298	.508	.327	.835
2005	F	108	380	54	91	20	1	20	57	14	64	5	1	.239	.455	.274	.729
2006	F	126	477	47	113	21	0	16	62	24	76	2	6	.258	.416	.298	.714
Total	---	1411	5163	647	1309	234	36	205	716	326	990	73	39	.254	.432	.305	.737

=== Managerial career ===
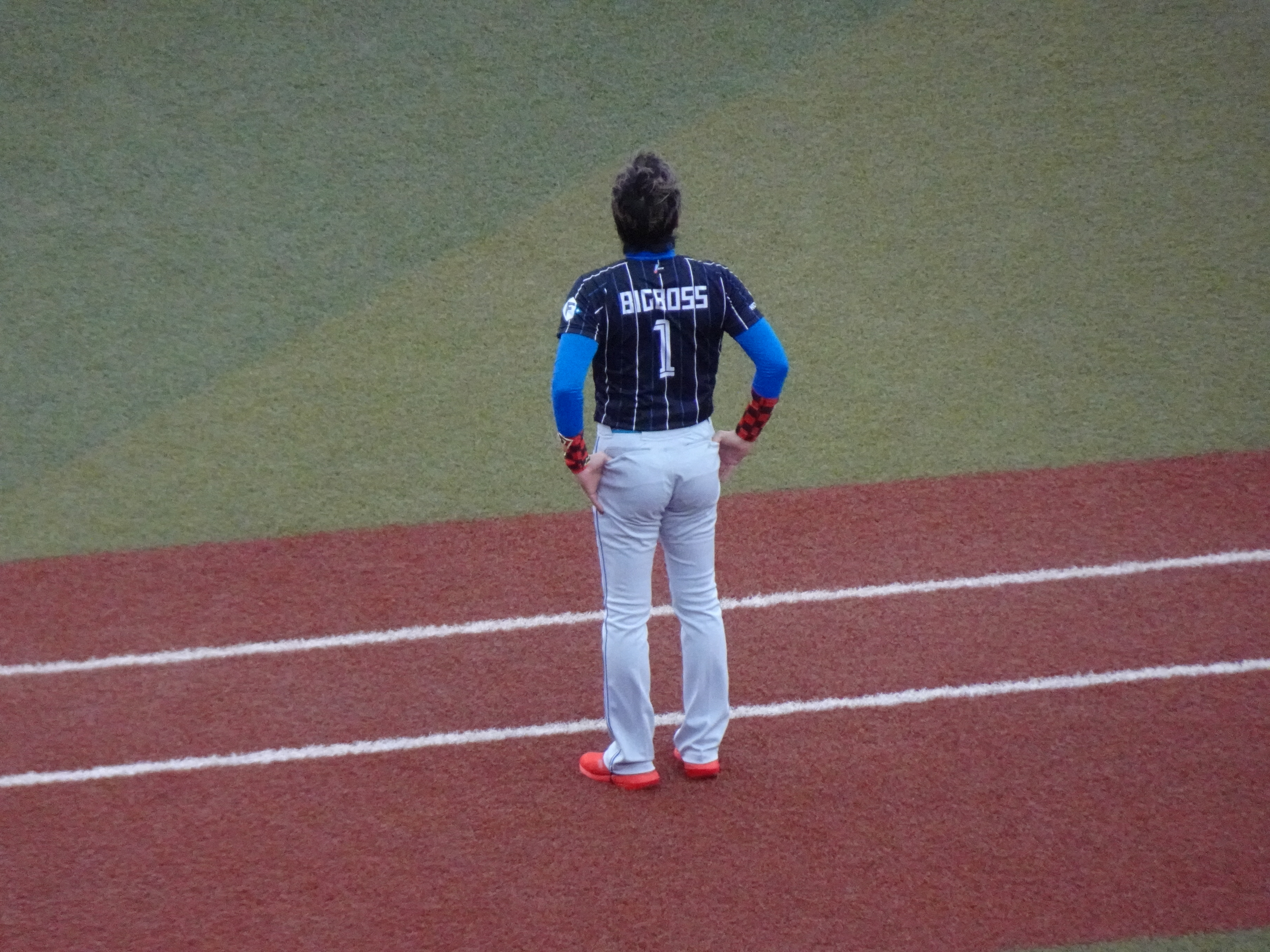
Tsuyoshi Shinjo in 2022

Team	Year	Regular season						Postseason			
Team	Year	Games	Won	Lost	Ties	Win %	Finish	Won	Lost	Win %	Result
F	2022	143	59	81	3	.421	6th (last) in PL	–			
F	2023	143	60	82	1	.423	6th (last) in PL	–			
F	2024	143	75	60	8	.556	2nd in PL	2	4	.333	Lost in PL Final Stage
F	2025	143	83	57	3	.593	2nd in PL	5	3	.625	Lost in PL Final Stage

== See also ==
- List of Major League Baseball players from Japan
