= Hokkaido Nippon-Ham Fighters =

Nippon Professional Baseball team in the Pacific League

- 北海道日本ハムファイターズ

Logo	Cap insignia

Information
- League: Nippon Professional Baseball Pacific League (1950–present) Japanese Baseball League (1946–1949)
- Location: Kitahiroshima, Hokkaido, Japan
- Ballpark: Es Con Field Hokkaido
- Founded: November 6, 1945; 81 years ago
- Nickname(s): Nichiham (日ハム, Nippon-ham)
- Japan Series championships: 3 (1962, 2006, 2016)
- PL pennants: 7 (1962, 1981, 2006, 2007, 2009, 2012, 2016)
- Playoff berths: 16 (1981, 1982, 2004, 2006, 2007, 2008, 2009, 2011, 2012, 2014, 2015, 2016, 2018, 2024, 2025, 2026)
- Former name: Nippon-Ham Fighters (1974–2003); Nittaku Home Flyers (1973); Toei Flyers (1954–1972); Tokyu Flyers (1949–1953); Kyuei Flyers (1948); Tokyu Flyers (1947); Senators (1946)
- Former ballparks: Sapporo Dome (2004–2022); Tokyo Dome (1988–2003); Korakuen Stadium (1964–1987); Meiji Jingu Stadium (1962–1963); Komazawa Stadium (1953–1961); Korakuen Stadium (1948–1953)
- Colors: Fighter Blue, White, Black
- Mascot: BB, Polly Polaris, and Frep the Fox
- Retired numbers: 100
- Ownership: Yoshihide Haneda
- Management: Nippon Ham Co., Ltd
- General manager: Atsunori Inaba
- Manager: Tsuyoshi Shinjo
- Website: https://www.fighters.co.jp/

Current uniforms

The Hokkaido Nippon-Ham Fighters (北海道日本ハムファイターズ, Hokkaidō Nippon-Hamu Faitāzu) are a Japanese professional baseball team based in Kitahiroshima, Hokkaidō, in the Sapporo metropolitan area. They compete in the Pacific League of Nippon Professional Baseball, playing the majority of their home games at Es Con Field Hokkaido. The Fighters also host a select number of regional home games in cities across Hokkaidō, including Hakodate, Asahikawa, Kushiro, and Obihiro. The team's name comes from its parent organization, Nippon Ham, a major Japanese food-processing company.

Founded in 1946, the Fighters called Tokyo home for 58 years, as co-tenants of the Tokyo Dome and Korakuen Stadium with the Central League's Yomiuri Giants near the end of their tenure in the capital city. The franchise has won three Japan Series titles, in 1962, 2006, and, most recently, 2016. Through 2026, the franchise's all-time record is 5,063–5,426–397 (.483). The team's current manager is Tsuyoshi Shinjo.

== Team history ==
=== Senators and Tokyo eras ===
In 1946, Saburo Yokozawa, manager of the Tokyo Senators in 1936–1937 (and later a prominent umpire), looked to revive the franchise and soon founded the new Senators. He assembled a team of ready and able players like Hiroshi Oshita, Shigeya Iijima and Giichiro Shiraki, but as a newly formed team the Senators faced strict fiscal management and resorted to using hand-me-down uniforms from the Hankyu Railway's pre-war team (who would eventually become the modern-day Orix Buffaloes). Former Japanese statesman Kinkazu Saionji, grandson of the influential Kinmochi Saionji, became the team's owner, and Noboru Oride, borrowing heavily from a Ginza cabaret proprietor, became the team's sponsor. Eventually, trapped by a lack of funds, Yokozawa was forced to resign as the team's manager.

For a time, the team was even mockingly nicknamed "Seito" (Bluestockings) after a Japanese feminist magazine of the same name. As the Yomiuri Giants' pet name was "Kyojin", baseball personality Soutaro Suzuki thought that other teams should also have pet names like the Giants, and names such as the Osaka Tigers' alias "Mouko" (fierce tiger), the Senators' "Seito" and the Pacific's "Taihei" (tranquility) began to be used by the press. However, the other teams rejected the use of these pet names, so they were not fully adopted.

On January 7, 1947, the team was sold to the Tokyu Corporation. The Tokyu baseball club was inaugurated into the league, and the team's name became the Tokyu Flyers. At that time Tokyu dominated the Japanese transportation sector, owning several other railway companies, although it was faced with troubles and the possibility of a breakup. Tokyu purchased the team to act as a banner of solidarity for the swelling company, and managing director Hiroshi Okawa assumed ownership of the club. The newly born Flyers, with Hiroshi Oshita becoming one of the most popular players in the league, began to attract many fans, but the team's administration still went into a deficit.

With the formation of the National Baseball League drawing nearer, in 1948 the not-yet-affiliated Daiei club, which had played a few exhibition games against the Otsuka Athletics, joined with Tokyu to create the Kyuei Flyers ("Kyuei" being a portmanteau of the two companies' names). However, Daiei decided to purchase a separate team, the Kinsei Stars, and after only one year the Flyers reverted to their former name.

During the off-season of 1949, the Flyers joined the Pacific League after the former league split. In September 1953, the team completed a new ballpark—Komazawa Stadium—along one of Tokyu's train lines in Setagaya, Tokyo, moving from Bunkyo ward's Korakuen Stadium. The Flyers' wild play on the field eventually earned them the nickname, "Komazawa's hooligans".

=== Toei and Nittaku eras ===
On February 1, 1954, Tokyu entrusted the management of the Flyers to the Toei Company, of which Okawa had newly become president. Toei transferred control of the club to a subsidiary company, Toei Kogyo (industrial enterprise). The team's name was changed to the Toei Flyers, and its legal name consequently became the Toei Flyers Baseball Club. This name stuck for nineteen years.

In 1961, when Yomiuri Giants manager Shigeru Mizuhara resigned from his position, Okawa attempted to woo him to join his team, bringing him to a bar in Kyoto and calling famous movie producer Koji Shundo to meet with them. Shundo, an old drinking buddy of Mizuhara's, convinced the four-time Japan Series champion manager to join the Flyers, and he solidified a strong relationship with Okawa and Toei Studios.

Komazawa Stadium was to be torn down to make way for the 1964 Tokyo Summer Olympics, so in 1962 the Flyers moved their base of operations to Meiji Jingu Stadium in Shinjuku. (At that time, college baseball teams had priority at Meiji Jingu, so during weekends or other times when school games were being played the Flyers had to use Korakuen or another field for their games.) In the same year, two star aces, Masayuki Dobashi and Yukio Ozaki, blossomed under Mizuhara's coaching and the Flyers captured their first league championship. They would go on to defy odds in the Japan Series and defeat the Hanshin Tigers for their first Japan Series title. This championship would be their only one in the Toei era. The Kokutetsu Swallows jointly occupied Meiji Jingu with the Flyers the following season, and in 1964 the Flyers went back to their old home, Korakuen, also home of the Yomiuri Giants; both the Fighters and Giants would share a home for the next 39 years.

The Flyers assembled a group of powerful sluggers over the next few years—among them: Isao Harimoto, Katsuo Osugi, Inchon Bek, and Shoichi Busujima—but on top of a declining movie industry and the "Black Mist" match-fixing scandal that rocked the professional baseball world in 1970 (after which Flyers ace Toshiaki Moriyasu was banned from the game for life), in 1971 Flyers owner Okawa died suddenly. Shigeru Okada, who did not view Okawa favorably, took over Toei after his death. Together with Noboru Goto, company president of Tokyu and loyal friend of Okada (and one who also thought unfavorably of Okawa), Okada let go of the unprofitable team.

The team was sold to Akitaka Nishimura of the Nittaku Home real estate enterprise, a common acquaintance of Okada and Goto, on February 7, 1973. The team's name became the Nittaku Home Flyers. Nishimura, in an attempt to inject life back into the unpopular Pacific League, developed seven different uniforms for his team and experimented in every aspect of the team's operation, but the effort failed to produce results. Believing that the Pacific League's chances of survival were grim, Nishimura was on the verge of partnering with the Lotte Orions, who were eyeing a league reunification. When the deal fell through, Nishimura, tired of the baseball establishment, resigned from his leadership position and abandoned the Flyers.

=== Nippon-Ham era ===
On November 19, 1973, meatpacking company Nippon Ham purchased the team, led by owner Yoshinori Okoso. Okoso had bought the team as he was willing to bring them back to prominence when essentially no one wanted them. He loved them to death, so much so that he never held any company meetings when the team was playing, and if where he was at, they were not on TV or radio, he would dispatch employees to go to that game and update him via payphone. The club's name was changed to the Nippon-Ham Fighters, its official name became the Nippon-Ham Baseball Corporation. Osamu Mihara became the team president and Futoshi Nakanishi, Mihara's son-in-law, as its manager. After 27 years, the "Flyers" nickname was abandoned. The "Fighters" nickname was born from a public appeal by the team's management. A female high school student from Okayama prefecture submitted the winning name, giving the reasoning that "(former Fighters player) Katsuo Osugi has guts, so he's a fighter." Osugi would be traded to the Yakult Swallows soon after the Fighters were rechristened. The same would be for Zainichi Korean Isao Harimoto, as Nakanishi hated Harimoto for challenging his authority, going nearly as far as trying to release him. This was also because Harimoto was upset that the Fighters sent away Osugi, and that he was the only reason he stuck around. In fact, when the then-Flyers attempted to trade Osugi to the Hanshin Tigers for Yutaka Enatsu (who the Fighters would ironically get later), Harimoto went to the front office and demanded they immediately cancel the trade. However, Okoso did not want to let him go, as Nippon-Ham had a major presence in South Korea, and it did wonders for sales having one of the greatest Koreans play for them, and having traded their other Korean player, Baek In-chun, to the Taiheyo Club Lions in 1974, Okoso was worried Nippon-Ham would completely lose their presence in South Korea. Mihara, however, persisted, and they nearly sent him to the Hanshin Tigers, before the Yomiuri Giants made a convincing last-minute deal to send him there instead.

Over the four seasons between 1974 and 1977, the Fighters dwelled at the bottom of the Pacific League, but after improving to finishing in third place for three straight years between 1978 and 1980, manager Keiji Osawa finally led the Fighters to their second Pacific League pennant in 1981. With saves leader Yutaka Enatsu and starter Shigekuni Mashiba (who went 15–0 over the season) forming the heart of the pitching staff, the Fighters shined with offensive sluggers Tony Solaita, Junichi Kashiwabara, and Tommy Cruz. The team that year also featured various important players of smaller stature, like Makoto Shimada and Nobuhiro Takashiro. They would go on to play the Yomiuri Giants in the Japan Series, where the Fighters lost in six games.

At the time, the franchise shared Korakuen Stadium with the Giants, so scheduling games throughout the season for both teams posed a problem. League schedulers tried to avoid putting the Fighters and the Giants at Korakuen on the same day, but when they both had home games scheduled, league officials made the implicit decision that the Giants would play during the day and the Fighters during the night. One novel aspect of the Fighters was that they attracted armies of grade-school boys to sit in the outfield stands on weekend games under a "Young Boys’ Fan Club" promotion, starting the first organized fan club in Japanese professional baseball.

During the 1980s the Fighters hosted many of the Pacific League's leading pitchers, including Isamu Kida (led the P.L. with 22 wins in his rookie year in 1980; won MVP, Rookie of the Year the same year), Mikio Kudō (20 wins in 1982), Hiroshi Tsuno (recorded double-digit win totals in several years throughout the mid-eighties) and Yasumitsu Shibata (three-time All Star; recorded no-hitter in 1990). Yukihiro Nishizaki particularly stood out, recording 15 wins and an ERA under three in each of his first two years (though the Rookie of the Year title eluded him), racking up seven double-digit win seasons over the course of his eleven-year stay with the Fighters and gaining a considerable following from female fans due to his easy-going demeanor. In 1986 shortstop Yukio Tanaka joined the club; he remained with the team for 22 seasons, becoming known as "Mr. Fighters".

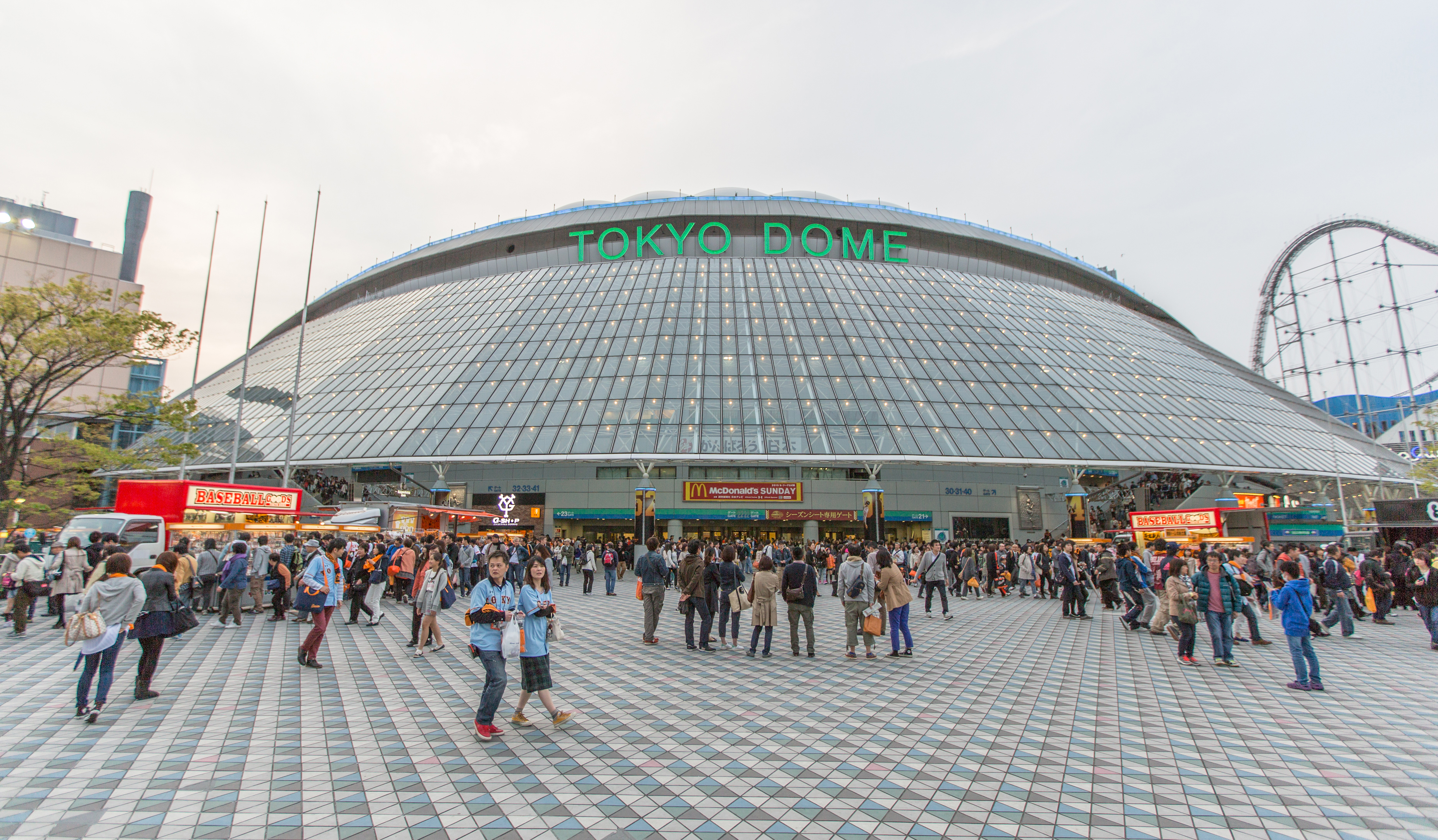
Tokyo Dome, former ballpark of the Fighters

From 1988 until the move to Hokkaidō, the Fighters played their home games in Tokyo Dome, the stadium that replaced their longtime home Korakuen. After the Dome was finished, the pitching dominance of Yukihiro Nishizaki and Yasumitsu Shibata began to emerge. Keiji Osawa came out of retirement to manage the team for a third time in 1993, only to see his team sink to the bottom of the standings; he gained notoriety for kneeling to the fans at the end of that season, begging for their forgiveness. With the Fighters experiencing more managerial troubles in 1996, then-manager Toshiharu Ueda suddenly took a personal leave during a pennant race with the Orix BlueWave, eventually causing the Fighters to fade over the last month of the season. However, new life was born in Tokyo Dome in 1998. Hitters such as Nigel Wilson, Jerry Brooks, Yukio Tanaka, Atsushi Kataoka, Katsuhiro Nishiura and a young Michihiro Ogasawara formed what became known as the Big Bang lineup and subsequently shattered various batting records. They ran away with first place for the first half of the season, but a pitching collapse in the second half caused a fall of historical proportions. The Fighters would ultimately finish in second place to the Seibu Lions.

=== Hokkaido Nippon-Ham era ===
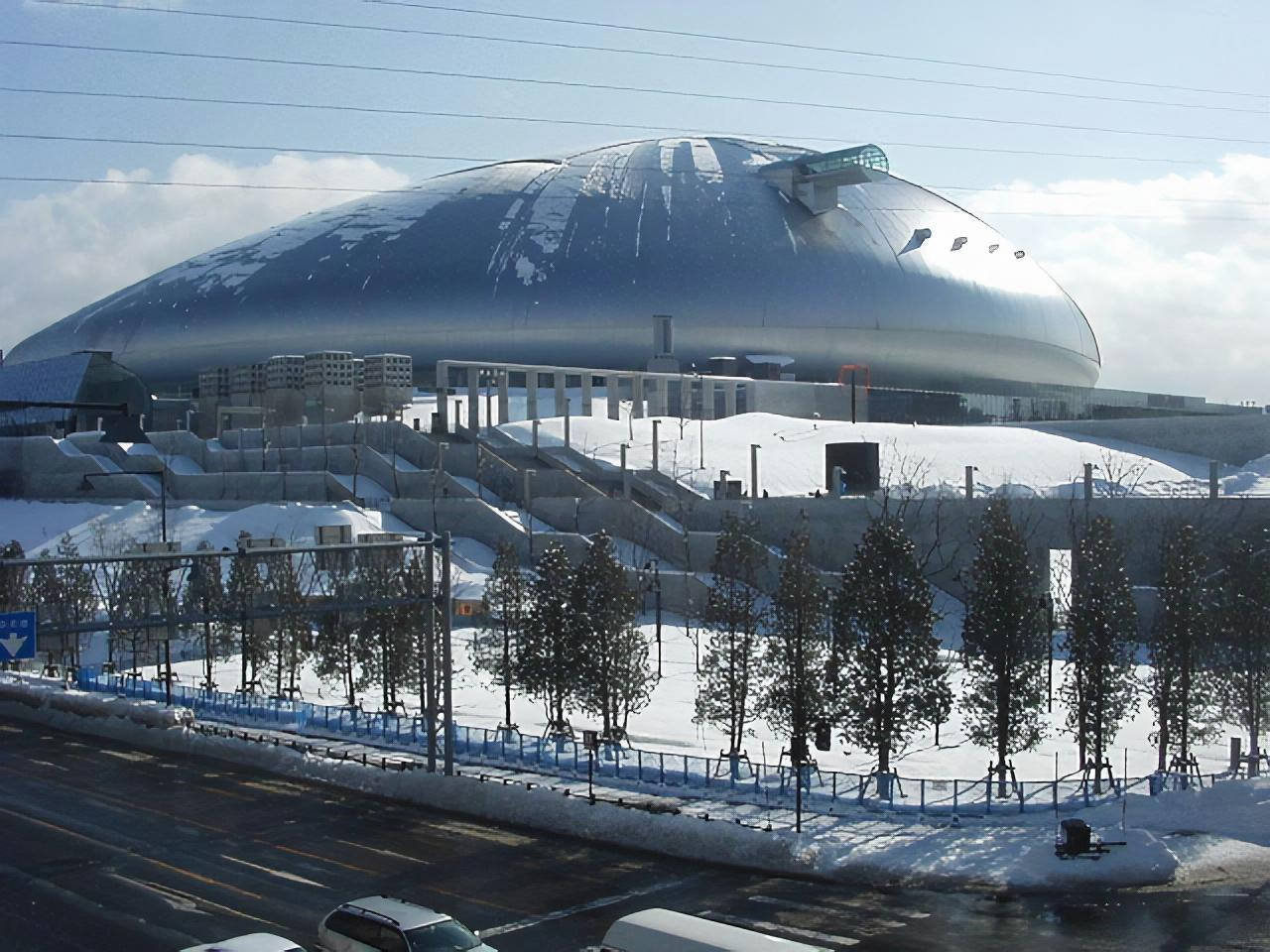
Sapporo Dome in 2004

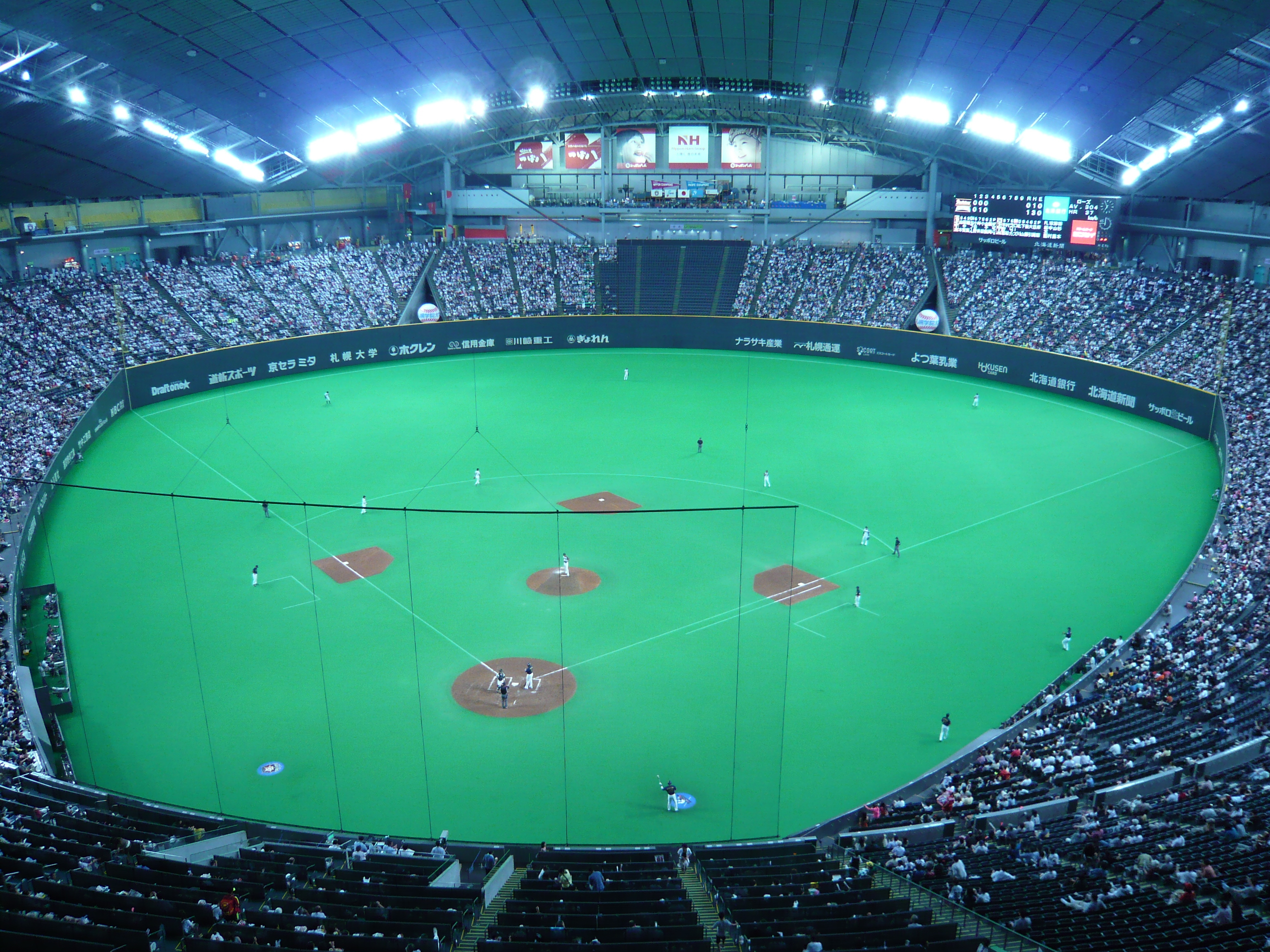
Sapporo dome

Prior to the 2002 season, the idea of moving the Fighters to Sapporo, the capital of Hokkaidō and Japan's fifth largest city, emerged. The Seibu Lions also had preliminary plans to move to the northern metropolis. Tokyo's Fighters fans voiced their opposition to the proposed relocation (though the franchise never drew as many fans as their co-habitual counterparts, the Giants, while playing in the capital), but it was eventually announced that the team would indeed call the Sapporo Dome its new home beginning in 2004. Aiming to build a grassroots relationship with its future fans, the team decided to change its name to the Hokkaido Nippon-Ham Fighters.

At first, with the unhappy Seibu Lions suddenly changing their approval vote, Giants owner Tsuneo Watanabe and Seibu owner Yoshiaki Tsutsumi voiced their concerns over the move. They believed that Nippon Ham's choice to move the team would spur a decentralization in Japanese professional baseball, and they threatened that a decrease in the number of teams in the Kantō and Kansai regions should merit a one-league system instead of two. As a matter of fact, the question of reorganizing baseball's league structure eventually became a bigger issue than the sale and renaming of the Kintetsu Buffaloes. The issue eventually settled down, though, and the Fighters' relocation was eventually approved by the league. The response from the people of Hokkaidō was weak, but NPB fans welcomed the move, noting that the Fighters could now be free from the Tokyo Dome's high rent and perpetual second-billing to the Giants. Out of respect for the Tokyo-based Fighters fans, the team decided to schedule a few "home" games per season at the Tokyo Dome.

After the move finally was complete in 2004, the Fighters signed former Tigers superstar Tsuyoshi Shinjo, who came back to NPB from MLB after playing with the New York Mets and nearly winning a World Series title with the San Francisco Giants, and a revitalized Fernando Seguignol. American manager Trey Hillman led the team to success in his second year on the job, and, at the end of the season, the Fighters were in a fierce race with the Chiba Lotte Marines for the final spot in the new P.L. playoff system. With a vital win over the Orix BlueWave on September 24, the newly moved Fighters earned a trip to the postseason, advancing to play Seibu in a three-game series. Though they put up a strong effort against Seibu ace Daisuke Matsuzaka, the Fighters lost the first game of the series 6–5. They took Game 2 by a score of 5–4. In the decisive third game, the Fighters fought back in the ninth inning after trailing for the whole game but ultimately fell to a Kazuhiro Wada walk-off home run, losing 6–5. The Fighters would have to wait for another chance for the P.L. pennant.

During the pennant race, the Fighters began selling tickets for infield reserved seats at a low 1,500 yen price point, in an attempt to draw fans to the park. At and after 7:30 pm, usually well after the first pitch, the team began selling special child-fare tickets called "730 Tickets" (they started the same promotion at the Tokyo Dome in 2005). In addition to these, in 2005 they added extra-low priced tickets, discount parking passes and beer coupons to attract more fans. As a result of these promotions, and partially due to the rising popularity of young pitcher Yu Darvish, drafted the year before, the left field stands became constantly sold out for exhibition games, regular season games and playoff games, filled with loud and raucous Ōendan. Even the right field stands, usually occupied by the visiting team's fans, began to fill with Fighters supporters. In 2005, the Fighters drew over one million fans for the first time since 1993, ranking second in the P.L. after the Fukuoka SoftBank Hawks.

Also in 2005, a previously unknown manager, Shigeru Takada, became the club's first general manager. On April 27, owner Yoshinori Ohkoso died. The Fighters retired the number 100 in his honor four years later, a first in club history (also the first retired number for owners in NPB; in North American Major League Baseball, the Los Angeles Angels of Anaheim (Gene Autry, 26) and St. Louis Cardinals (August A. Busch Jr., 85) have retired numbers, and in Minor League Baseball, the Kannapolis Cannon Ballers (Dale Earnhardt Sr., 3) are the most notable team owners with retired numbers). The number 100 was chosen because, when the Fighters won the 1981 Pacific League pennant, their first under Nippon-Ham, Okoso was given a ceremonial jersey number of 100. Yukio Tanaka reached a career 1,000 RBI total, and Makoto Kaneko joined the 1,000 hit club in the same year. On September 20, the Lions smashed the Fighters at home, crushing the Fighters’ hopes of making the playoffs for the second year in a row. In the offseason, the Fighters acquired Major League veteran José Macías, and, as former number one starter Yusaku Iriki tried his luck in America, the club attempted to sign Kazuhisa Ishii, but failed. In the draft, the team selected pitchers Tomoya Yagi and Masaru Takeda. And before the 2006 season, Shigeyuki Furuki and Kazunari Sanematsu were traded to the Giants for pitcher Hideki Okajima.

The 2006 season would turn out to be a monumental one for the Fighters. After defeating the Tokyo Yakult Swallows on the final day of interleague play, the Fighters went on an eleven-game winning streak, the best such streak for the franchise in over 45 years and tying the team record. After achieving the feat, the team had a six- and a seven-game winning streak, demonstrating to the rest of the P.L. that they were a dangerous club.

A fierce struggle for first place developed between the Fighters, Lions and Hawks. On September 27, the Fighters emerged in first place, earning the title "Regular Season Champions". They also boasted the best team ERA (3.05) and the best team home run total (135) in the NPB. Yu Darvish had an especially impressive year, winning 12 games and posting an ERA of 2.89, establishing himself as the ace of the Fighters’ staff.

The Fighters swept the Hawks in the second stage of the P.L. playoffs to earn their third pennant. In the Japan Series, the team won their first Japanese championship in 44 years, defeating the Chunichi Dragons in five games. Fittingly, Darvish pitched for the win in the final game of the series. The series' MVP honors went to Fighters' outfielder Atsunori Inaba, who hit for a .357 batting average during the series with one home run and six RBIs. The championship win was especially fitting for OF Tsuyoshi Shinjo, who was a longtime veteran of the Hanshin Tigers (who were perennial losers), and also had played for a brief time in the United States' Major League Baseball. It was Shinjo's ultimate desire to win a championship, and he did in the final year of his illustrious career in Japan with Nippon-Ham. Shinjo would return 14 years later for a tryout, but failed to qualify. He, however, would go on to be later named manager.

This victory gave the Fighters a berth in the four-team Asia Series, in which the team went undefeated in the round-robin and won the final 1–0 over the La New Bears.

The 2006 offseason saw the departure of two of Nippon-Ham's best players, both via free agency. First baseman Michihiro Ogasawara was signed to a blockbuster contract with the Yomiuri Giants, and left-handed reliever Hideki Okajima departed to the Boston Red Sox. At the start of the 2007 season, Nippon-Ham had a lot of trouble scoring runs, relying far too much on their pitching, despite the continuing maturation of Yu Darvish, who had back-to-back complete-game, 14-strikeout performances early in the season. At one point, Nippon Ham was second-to-last in the Pacific League, but was able to turn it around. With the start of Interleague play, Nippon-Ham began a 14-game winning streak, which ended on June 9 with a 3–2 extra-inning loss to the Yakult Swallows, with the bullpen wasting another great performance by Darvish.

The Fighters went on to win the Pacific League championship and went through the Climax Series to earn a second consecutive trip to the Japan Series to once again face the Chunichi Dragons. But in a reversal of roles from the prior year, the Fighters took Game 1, but the Dragons took the next four games to defeat the Fighters; the last of which being a combined perfect game by Dragons pitchers Daisuke Yamai and Hitoki Iwase.

In 2007, Yukio Tanaka's final season, he recorded his 2,000th career hit, during a May 15 game against the Tohoku Rakuten Golden Eagles.

The Fighters would win the Pacific League championship again in 2009 and 2012, but they would lose both times in the Japan Series to the Yomiuri Giants.

In 2012, the Fighters drafted Shohei Ohtani, who made his debut in 2013. Despite Ohtani wanting to play for MLB, the Fighters drafted him anyways, as they would have lost him to an MLB team. Ohtani signed with the Fighters nonetheless. With his ability to both pitch and hit, he quickly became a star for the team. He was selected as an NPB all-star five times and was named Pacific League MVP in 2016. Behind Ohtani, the Fighters returned to the Japan Series in 2016, facing the Hiroshima Toyo Carp. After dropping the first two games on the road, the Fighters rallied to win the next four games en route to their first championship since 2006.

In 2017, the Fighters drafted Kotaro Kiyomiya, a child prodigy entering the draft with high expectations and a number-one overall pick. The Fighters got his contract negotiation rights after winning a lottery in the draft between six other NPB teams. As Japan would soon find out, however, he became a draft bust. What made it even worse was Munetaka Murakami, also on Kiyomiya's draft class, who was drafted by the Swallows after losing out to him, was hitting more home runs than him at a rapid pace and already won a Japan Series title with the Swallows. As of 2022, Kiyomiya only had 21 home runs, while Murakami already had 104, and became the youngest NPB player to hit 100 home runs, at only 22 years old. Kiyomiya also did not play on the first squad in 2021. Kiyomiya was also being plagued by injuries, whilst Murakami managed to stay healthy and has played the full 143-game schedule with the Swallows. However, in recent years, Kiyomiya would develop himself into a better player; by 2024, he was back as a regular on the Fighters top team.

In 2017, Ohtani left the Fighters to sign with the Los Angeles Angels.

On January 8, 2018, the Fighters signed a partnership agreement with the Texas Rangers to exchange scouting info with each other and the Rangers will share advice to the Fighters for their plans to build ES-CON Field Hokkaido. ES-CON Field plans would be similar to the then-under construction Globe Life Field in Arlington. Both ballparks would have mixed use community districts, and similar structure, hence why both ballparks look very similar. Also, this was due to the stadium being designed by HKS Architects, who also designed Globe Life Field.

In October 2021, the Fighters replaced longtime manager Hideki Kuriyama, who went on to become manager of Samurai Japan, with former player Tsuyoshi Shinjo. He is best known for winning his first Japan Series title in his last game before retirement.

On January 21, 2022, new manager Tsuyoshi Shinjo unveiled a new logo and uniform for the Fighters. The response from fans was mixed to mostly negative. Fans often compared their jerseys to the Toronto Blue Jays due to the font they used.

On March 24, 2022, Shinjo was approved by the NPB to be registered as "BIGBOSS" for the 2022 season.

On September 28, 2022, the Fighters played their final game at Sapporo Dome, an 11–3 loss to the Chiba Lotte Marines and the team finished the season with the worst record in the NPB. After the game, it was announced that Tsuyoshi Shinjo would continue being manager for the 2023 season, but he will not wear "BIGBOSS" on his jersey, and that the BIGBOSS persona would be retired. They would again fare poorly in the 2023 season, finishing with the 3rd worst record in the NPB, primarily thanks to the team suffering a 14 game losing streak in the middle of the year, including 7 straight games of losing by a lone run. However, one of the biggest standouts that year was from Japanese-Congo player Chusei Mannami, who finished with the second most home runs in Pacific League, hitting 25, just below Gregory Polanco, Kensuke Kondoh, and Hideto Asamura, who all hit 26 each. He also became the second player in NPB history to hit a lead-off and walk-off home run in the same game against the Hawks in September.

2024 would prove to be a standout year for the Fighters, finally making the playoffs for the first time since 2018, with a record of 75-60-8, finishing in second place. Among individual accomplishments included Chusei Mannami winning his second Golden Glove award, new foreign signing Franmil Reyes making the Best Nine for the Pacific League, alongside breaking Fernando Seguignol's Fighters record for most consecutive games with a hit at 25 games, and Shun Mizutani, whom the Fighters acquired from the Hawks in the active player draft, having a breakout season, culminating in him winning Interleague MVP. In the postseason, after going down in the first game against the Chiba Lotte Marines, and seeming to be going down in the second, with Shinjo stating he wasn't going to use team ace Hiromi Itoh, because he thought he would be needed for the Final Stage against the Hawks, Mannami would hit a game tying home run off Naoya Masuda, then Daiki Asama would then hit a walk-off hit an inning later. After winning the third game, the Fighters would advance to the Final Stage, where they would get swept by the Hawks in three games, with SoftBank getting a one-game advantage.

== The Fox Dance ==
The Fox Dance is a tradition of the Fighters to do during the middle of innings, in which they encouraged fans, alongside cheerleaders, to dance similarly to the moves of a fox, set to the Ylvis song "The Fox (What Does the Fox Say?)", which began in May 2022. The origins of this tradition came from Fighters staff member and former Fighters Girl member Sari Ogure, who watched the music video 2 years prior. Due to the COVID-19 pandemic disallowing any cheering or singing at games, she wanted to make a choreographed dance that would be simple for anyone to memorize, especially children. She had planned to propose this dance, but waited until it was right for her to do so, which came at the hiring of Tsuyoshi Shinjo as manager, after then manager Hideki Kuriyama left the team to become the manager of Samurai Japan.

The dance was introduced in a game against the Saitama Seibu Lions, and while it was not a hit right out of the gate, the dance began to majorly gain traction after Pacific League TV (Pacific League's centralized streaming service) and the Fighters posted the dance on their YouTube channels. The dance, from then on out, became a major hit at Fighters games, and despite the team struggling in 2022, it became an entertaining part of games. It became so popular that on September 19, 2022, Ylvis went to Japan and performed the song live prior to a game against the Chiba Lotte Marines.

The dance's success led to the term "fox dance" to be ranked 3rd in the New Word/Buzzword Contest in 2022, a contest about new words/terms that were popular in Japan in a particular year, behind Kyiv, the capital of Ukraine (in honor of the attacks of Russia to Ukraine in 2022) and Murakami-sama (after Tokyo Yakult Swallows player Munetaka Murakami's 2022 season, where he broke Sadaharu Oh's single season home run record for Japanese born players), with the ceremony being attended by Ogure herself, Fighters Girl members, and mascot Frep the Fox, the main idea sake of the dance itself. Fighters Girl members, alongside Japanese idol group Hinatazaka46, performed the song during the Kohaku Uta Gassen annual concert on New Year's Eve on December 31, 2022.

Notable names that done the dance with Fighters Girl include actress and former Takarazuka Revue member Sei Matobu, Japanese idol group Nogizaka46 member Saya Kanagawa, and Fox Sports analyst and brother of MLB pitcher Justin Verlander, Ben Verlander, amongst other people, including opposing team's cheerleading squads.

The dance has also found itself being performed in a few areas thanks to its popularity, including one by the cheerdancing squad of CPBL team Rakuten Monkeys (which is also thanks in fact that the club is owned by Rakuten, the same company who owns the Tohoku Rakuten Golden Eagles of NPB), another by J.League club Cerezo Osaka (due in part to the club being partially owned by Fighters owner Nippon-Ham), and it appearing in multiple shows in Japan, including a performance during an annual event sponsored by Nippon TV, with NPB players Naoyuki Uwasawa and Shugo Maki.

== Dschinghis Khan Dance ==
Another dance tradition the Fighters have was introduced in 2023, coinciding with their move to Es Con Field Hokkaido, also following the success of The Fox Dance, named the Dschinghis Khan dance. Similar to The Fox Dance, fans, alongside cheerleaders would dance, this time with a tambourine shaped like a pot from the era of Genghis Khan, which can also relate to the local cuisine of Hokkaido. The song that accompanies it is a Japanese cover by Fighters Girl of the song of the same name by the eponymous disco group from Germany. The dance was also upgraded on 29 April to coincide with the beginning of Golden Week in Japan, adding sheep ear headbands to the cheerleaders.

== Players ==
Hokkaido Nippon-Ham Fighters roster
First team		Second team
Pitchers: 12 Kōta Yazawa; 14 Takayuki Katoh; 15 Kōki Kitayama; 16 Kōta Tatsu; 17 Hiromi Itoh; 18 Sachiya Yamasaki; 20 Kenta Uehara; 19 Taishō Tamai; 28 Ryūsei Kawano; 29 Haruki Hosono; 31 Reo Shibata; 34 Mizuki Hori; 45 Ren Fukushima; 47 Taisei Yanagawa; 74 Kōhei Arihara; 96 Sun Yi-Lei; Catchers: 3 Yūya Gunji; 33 Yūya Shintō; 57 Kaito Fujimori; 64 Yua Tamiya	Infielders: 5 Yūki Nomura; 21 Kōtarō Kiyomiya; 43 Tatsuki Mizuno; 49 Ruan Ohtsuka; 54 Shū Yamagata; 56 Ryōhei Hosokawa; 58 Taiki Narama; Outfielders: 7 Haruki Nishikawa; 50 Ryōta Isobata; 66 Chūsei Mannami; 99 Franmil Reyes; Manager: 1 Tsuyoshi Shinjō; Coaches: 77 Takaya Hayashi (Head); 73 Hisashi Takeda (Pitching); 82 Takeharu Katoh (Pitching); 81 Toshitake Yokoo (Batting); 72 Katsuhiko Yamada (Battery); 85 Ryōta Yachi (Infield defense/base running); 80 Hichori Morimoto (Outfield defense/base running); 79 Tetsuya Matsumoto (Fielding); 91 Chihiro Kaneko (Pitching coordinator); 87 Tomoaki Satoh (Batting coordinator)	Pitchers: 13 Tsubasa Nabatame; 24 Shōma Kanemura; 25 Naoki Miyanishi; 26 Seigi Tanaka; 28 Ryūsei Kawano; 30 Sauryn Lao; 32 Ryūsei Fujita; 35 Tamon Asari; 37 Gu Lin Ruei-yang; 40 Hiroya Shimamoto; 41 Kōji Fukutani; 46 Kyōsuke Kuroyanagi; 48 Yukiya Saitō; 52 Takahide Ikeda; 55 Taiki Kikuchi; 62 Daiki Shimizu; 63 Kōtarō Yamashiro; 67 Takumi Yamamoto; 93 Kōki Matsuoka; 94 Kotarō Seimiya; Catchers: 2 Ariel Martínez; 10 Yūshi Shimizu; 38 Lyle Lin; 60 Kengo Yoshida; 98 Yūki Umebayashi	Infielders: 4 Daigo Kamikawabata; 6 Rodolfo Castro; 9 Takuya Nakashima; 39 Naoki Arizono; 44 Uta Sakaguchi; 51 Minato Handa; 65 Ryōsuke Myōse; 95 Hiroki Tsuneya; Outfielders: 8 Daiki Asama; 36 Kazuki Miyazaki; 42 Kane Edokpolo; 53 Shun Mizutani; 61 Yūma Imagawa; Manager: 90 Atsunori Inaba; Coaches: 78 Masaji Shimizu (General); 83 Hiroshi Urano (Pitching); 92 Takayoshi Eguchi (Pitching); 75 Tomoyuki Oda (Batting); 71 Naoki Matoba (Battery); 84 Manabu Iwadate (Infield defense/base running); 76 Toshimasa Konta (Outfield defense/base running)
Development Players
121 Sorato Kawakatsu (P); 122 Junki Shibuya (P); 124 Towa Yokoyama (P)
Updated October 30, 2026		→ All NPB rosters

Retired numbers

- 100 (Japan) Yoshinori Ohkoso (Former chairman)

Honoured numbers

- 86 (Japan) Keiji Ohsawa (Former manager)
- 11 (Japan) Yu Darvish
- 11 (Japan) Shohei Ohtani

=== Former Fighters in MLB ===
Active:

- Yu Darvish (2012—present)
- Shohei Ohtani (2018—present)
- Chris Martin (2018–present)
- Nick Martinez (2022–present)

Retired:

- Masanori Murakami (1964–1965)
- Tim McIntosh (1996)
- Masao Kida (1999–2005)
- Tsuyoshi Shinjo (2001–2003)
- Takahito Nomura (2002)
- Hideki Okajima (2007–2011, 2013)
- Brandon Knight (2008)
- Andy Green (2009)
- Mitch Jones (2009)
- Erick Almonte (2011)
- Yoshinori Tateyama (2011–2012)
- Buddy Carlyle (2011, 2014–15)
- Luis Jiménez (2012)
- Kensuke Tanaka (2013)
- Anthony Bass (2017—2023)
- Kohei Arihara (2021–2022)
- Robbie Erlin (2022)
- Naoyuki Uwasawa (2024)

== Managers ==
#	Years	Seasons	Managers	G	W	L	T	Win%	Pacific League championships	Japan Series championships	Playoff berths
1	1946	1	Saburo Yokozawa	105	47	58	0	.448			
2	1947–1948	2	Hisanori Karita	259	110	135	14	.449			
3	1949	1	Toshiharu Inokawa (1st)	138	64	73	1	.467			
4	1950–1951	2	Shinobu Ando	222	89	125	8	.416			
5	1952–1954	3	Toshiharu Inokawa (2nd)	368	151	212	5	.416			
6	1955	1	Koichi Yasui	143	51	89	3	.364			
7	1956–1960	5	Yoshiyuki Iwamoto	683	290	376	17	.435			
8	1961–1967	7	Shigeru Mizuhara	983	526	429	28	.551	1 (1962)	1 (1962)	
9	1968	1	Hiroshi Ohshita	135	51	79	5	.392			
10	1969	1	Kenjiro Matsuki	130	57	70	3	.449			
11	1970	1	Kenjiro Matsuki, Kenjiro Tamiya	130	54	70	6	.435			
12	1971–1972	2	Kenjiro Tamiya	260	107	135	18	.442			
13	1973	1	Kenjiro Tamiya, Masayuki Dobashi (1st)	130	55	69	6	.444			
14	1974–1975	2	Futoshi Nakanishi	260	104	138	18	.430			
15	1976–1983	8	Keiji Ohsawa (1st)	1,040	493	469	78	.512	1 (1981)		2 (1981, 1982)
16	1984	1	Yoshinobu Uemura, Keiji Ohsawa (2nd)	130	44	73	13	.376			
17	1985–1988	4	Shigeru Takada	520	235	255	30	.480			
18	1989–1991	3	Sadao Kondoh	390	173	208	9	.454			
19	1992	1	Masayuki Dobashi (2nd)	130	54	73	3	.425			
20	1993–1994	2	Keiji Ohsawa (3rd)	260	117	131	12	.472			
21	1995–1999	5	Toshiharu Ueda	665	317	335	13	.486			
22	2000–2002	3	Yasunori Oshima	415	183	225	7	.449			
23	2003–2007	5	Trey Hillman	689	351	324	14	.520	2 (2006, 2007)	1 (2006)	3 times (2004, 2006, 2007)
24	2008–2011	4	Masataka Nashida	576	301	261	14	.536	1 (2009)		3 times (2008, 2009, 2011)
25	2012–2021	10	Hideki Kuriyama	1,267	629	604	34	.510	2 (2012, 2016)	1 (2016)	5 times (2012, 2014, 2015, 2016, 2018)
26	2022–present		Tsuyoshi Shinjo	286	119	163	4	.422			2 (2024, 2025)
Totals	75 seasons		21 managers	9,551	4,653	5,016	359	.481	7 times	3 times	13 times

- Statistics current through the end of the 2025 season.

== Mascots ==
- Bear mascot (official name unknown): Only appeared on uniforms from 1949–1950.
- Boy wearing a hat (official name unknown): Only appeared on printed materials from 1972–1973.
- Hercules shooting a bow (official name unknown): Appeared in the logo until 1981.
- Boy wearing a uniform (official name unknown): Appeared in the logo from 1982–1987.
- Görotan (ギョロタン) (retired): a large red fuzzy creature with long feathered hair that served as mascot from 1980 to 1987. He is based on the sun. He often rode on a bicycle, but in later years he rode on a scooter. He was the first costumed mascot in the Pacific League. In 2014, he returned in the Legend Series along with Fighty, and they have appeared at every Legend Series since.
- Fight-kun (ファイトくん) (retired): a winged warrior with a bat and a helmet who first appeared in 1988 as a replacement for Görotan. Appeared as a logo and as a costume.
- Armored warrior (official name unknown): Appeared in the logo from 1993–2003.
- Fighty (ファイティー) (retired): a bright pink pterodactyl whose head resembled a giant leg of ham and who sometimes rode a bicycle around the field. He appeared from 1993–2005. On August 17, 2005, Fighty was retired, despite the (unsuccessful) "Save Fighty" campaign, when the Fighters moved to Hokkaidō. In 2014, he returned in the Legend Series along with Görotan, and they have appeared at every Legend Series since.
- B·B (Brisky the Bear) (ブリスキー・ザ・ベアー): a black bear with a black mohawk on his head. Although his full name is Brisky, he prefers to be called B·B. On Sundays, the mohawk is orange, and sometimes the mohawk is white. In 212 Story locations, his mohawk is pink. He first appeared in 2004, as the successor to Fighty. When B·B was first introduced, his appearance was criticized by some of the Fighters' supporters for being too Americanized. On the Fighters official website, B·B has his own photo gallery and column. The costume was updated in 2005 because the original costume was becoming damaged and it was difficult to perform in. On April 5, 2006, B·B injured his left foot during a match at the Tokyo Dome and was diagnosed with a serious injury of 3 months. He appeared with a crutch the next day, and returned on July 4, 2006. B·B was also the mascot of Nippon Ham from 2004–2017. He has his own section on the website called B·B Diary. In 2019, he launched a blog, which was called B·B The Home. As of 2022, he has barely appeared in any more games, and is primarily now going around different communities in Hokkaido.
- baby・B (ベビー・ビー) (retired): a young version of B·B who is an elementary school student. He first appeared in 2010. He resembles his father. In his first appearance, he appeared on the monitor and watered the crowd with a hose. Since then, he has calmed down by receiving direct guidance from B·B. He does not exist as a mascot costume. As of 2022, no media has surfaced to prove he was a real mascot of the Fighters at all.
- Cubby (Cubby the Bear) (カビー・ザ・ベアー): a brown bear and younger brother of B·B. Although it shows the text "C·B" on the back of his uniform, it is pronounced "Cubby" and not "Sea B". He loves to eat strange foods, but because of this he has a weak stomach and becomes embarrassed when this is brought up. He appeared in 2006 as the mascot of the Fighters' minor league team, based in Kamagaya, Chiba. He also has a Twitter account. Cubby and B·B performed for each team, but also sometimes perform together when the Fighters' professional team plays in Tokyo. He sometimes goes to kindergartens and nursery schools, and in 2010 he was appointed as a one-day Chief of the Kamagaya Police Station and participated in the crime prevention campaign.
- Polly Polaris (ポリーポラリス): a brown squirrel who appeared late 2012, at the same time when the Fighters announced their 10th season. She's the first female mascot that was introduced to the team. Her current look now has her fur be a lighter shade of brown compared to her introduction. According to her backstory, she was childhood friends with Brisky.
- Frep the Fox (フレップ・ザ・フォックス): An Ezo red fox, who debuted in March 2016. He is gray with red markings, and he is considered an "apprentice". In 2018, he graduated from apprentice status and he replaced B·B as the main mascot, although B·B still performs at almost all games. He also has an Instagram account, and B·B and Polly also post on there. On May 6, 2019, Frep injured his left leg during a performance at the Zozo Marine Stadium. He planned to return on June 1, 2019. However, he did not return until June 28, 2019, when he appeared with a cast. On June 13, 2018, in a game against the Hanshin Tigers, he was involved in a wrestling match against Jushin Liger after a ceremonial first pitch and lost the match.

== Minor League team ==
The Fighters farm team plays in the Eastern League. The team was founded in 1948.The farm is in Chiba Prefecture, not Hokkaido.
