= Yasuyoshi Kato =

Japanese businessman (born 1950s)

- 加藤 安良
- Born: 1957 or 1958; Japan
- Occupation: Businessman
- Known for: Former CFO of Day-Lee Foods; Convicted of embezzling approximately $100 million
- Criminal charges: Wire fraud, Bank fraud, Tax fraud
- Criminal penalty: 63 months imprisonment
- Spouse: Doris Ann Beiler-Hozumi (m. 1984; div. 1991)

Yasuyoshi Kato (Japanese: 加藤 安良, Hepburn: Kato Yasuyoshi; born 1957 or 1958) is a Japanese former businessman who was the chief financial officer of Day-Lee Foods (a subsidiary of Nippon Ham) until March 1997, when he was convicted of embezzlement and was sentenced to five years in prison.

== Biography ==
Kato was born in Japan in 1957 or 1958. In 1984, Kato married Doris Ann Beiler-Hozumi. They divorced in 1991, with Yasuyoshi agreeing to pay her and their two daughters $600,000 in family support every year. He began working for Day-Lee Foods in 1983, becoming one of the company's directors in 1992.

In 1989 or 1990, Kato began embezzling funds from Day-Lee by sending checks to himself using the company's account and deposited them at his personal account. To evade detection, he used handwritten checks, using lines of credit to replace the missing cash, and masked the loans using creative accounting. Attorney Nathan Hochman called it "outlandish in its simplicity". Using this process, he embezzled an estimated $100 million over seven years.

Using the funds, according to prosecutors, Kato lent hundreds of thousands of dollars to a female friend's Torrance nightclub, bought Lexuses and condos for several girlfriends, and became partner and financier to a Century 21 Real Estate office. Additionally, he owned four properties in Rolling Hills, California. Most of the money went to his ex-wife, Doris, who bought twenty Arabian horses, several emus, llamas, potbellied pigs, miniature cattle, and a pair of Hyacinth macaws and nurse sharks; an assistant U.S. attorney said she wanted to start a petting zoo.

During early 1997, the IRS began investigating Kato for fraud, possibly due to an anonymous tip. He and his wife were sued by Day-Lee Foods during March 1997.

Kato pled guilty to two counts of wire fraud, bank fraud and tax fraud, alongside one count of criminal forfeiture on July 2, 1997. He was sentenced to 63 months in prison and was ordered to pay back $100 every year he was in custody. The judge presiding over the case, Stephen Victor Wilson, criticized Kato's sentence, stating that "it seems remarkable that the sentencing guidelines, as stringent as they are in other areas, only permit a sentence of this amount for something as extraordinary as this case".
