= Es Con Field Hokkaido =

Stadium in Kitahiroshima, Hokkaido Prefecture, Japan

- エスコンフィールド北海道

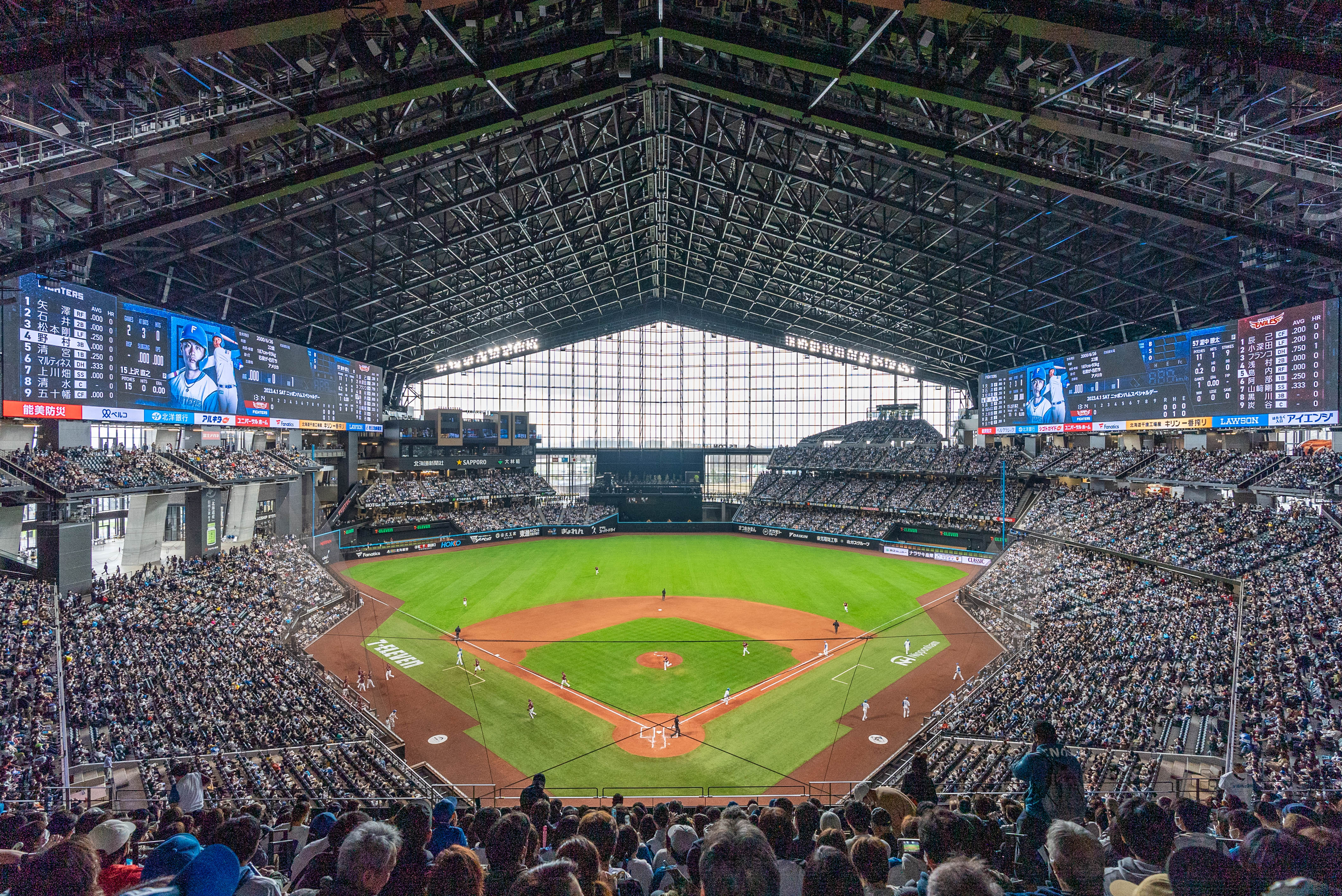
- Interactive map of Es Con Field Hokkaido
- Address: Hokkaido Ballpark F Village, Kyoei
- Location: Kitahiroshima, Hokkaido, Japan
- Coordinates: 42°59′23″N 141°32′58″E
- Owner: Fighters Sports & Entertainment
- Operator: Fighters Sports & Entertainment
- Capacity: 35,000
- Surface: Grass (2023–2024); Artificial infield/grass outfield (2025–present)
- Field size: Left field – 97 m (318 ft); Center field – 121 m (397 ft); Right field – 99 m (325 ft)
- Public transit: JR Hokkaido: Chitose Line at Kita-Hiroshima

Construction
- Groundbreaking: April 13, 2020
- Opened: March 14, 2023
- Architects: Obayashi Corporation, HKS Architects
- Builders: Obayashi Corporation, Iwata Chizaki Inc.

Tenant
- Hokkaido Nippon-Ham Fighters (NPB) (2023–present)

Es Con Field Hokkaido (エスコンフィールド北海道, Esukon Fīrudo Hokkaidō) is a baseball stadium located in Kitahiroshima, Hokkaido, Japan. The ballpark is owned by and operated by Nippon Ham, which has used it as the home field for the Hokkaido Nippon-Ham Fighters of Nippon Professional Baseball (NPB) since its opening in 2023. Designed by Obayashi Corporation and HKS Architects, the stadium has capacity for 35,000 people. It is Japan's second retractable roof facility and its asymmetrical playing surface is only the third natural turf field in NPB. The area immediately surrounding the stadium is being developed into Hokkaido Ballpark F Village, an entertainment district that holds commercial facilities and restaurants.

The first game was held on March 30, 2023, between the Nippon-Ham Fighters and the Tohoku Rakuten Golden Eagles, with former Nippon Ham Fighters managers Hideki Kuriyama, Masataka Nashida and Trey Hillman throwing out the first pitch to celebrate the opening of the stadium.

== History ==
=== Background ===
In early 2016, the Hokkaido Nippon-Ham Fighters, a Nippon Professional Baseball (NPB) team, began considering constructing a new stadium in or around Sapporo. Since first relocating to Sapporo from Tokyo in 2004, the Fighters played their home games in Sapporo Dome, a multi-purpose stadium. Instead of being owned and operated by the team, the facility was owned by the city of Sapporo and operated and managed by Sapporo Dome Co., Ltd., a voluntary sector company funded by the city and its community. At the time, the dome was charging the Fighters approximately ¥16 million (about $108,000) per game to play at the facility in front of a capacity crowd; annually, the team was spending around ¥1.3 billion (about $8.8 million) to play there. Additionally, Nippon Ham did not make any money on concessions or advertising in the stadium during their games. The high rental fees, loss of in-stadium sales revenue, and inflexibility of a multi-purpose facility all contributed to Nippon Ham's decision to explore building their own stadium. The team considered 15 to 20 sites in Hokkaido as candidates to build their new ballpark, including the campus of Hokkaido University in Kita-ku, Sapporo, the Makomanai district in Minami-ku, Sapporo, and the planned "Kitahiroshima Sports Park" site in Kitahiroshima, a suburb of Sapporo.

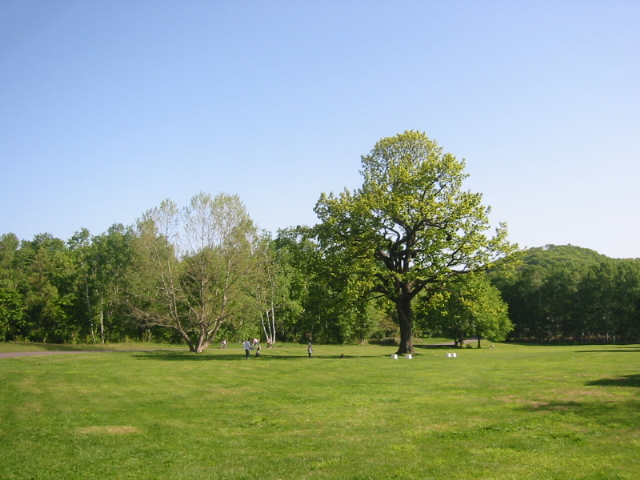
Makomanai Park in Sapporo was proposed as a site for the Fighters' new ballpark.

NPB set up a task force in collaboration with Nippon Ham in December 2016 to advance the new stadium project and develop a firm plan by March 2018. The mayor of Kitahiroshima met team representatives to propose its sports park concept. It offered up 20 of the 36 hectares at its "Kitahiroshima Sports Park" site for a natural grass, retractable roof baseball stadium capable of seating 30,000 people. Additionally, the site could be home to an indoor practice field, training facilities, and commercial space. Initially, Sapporo appealed to the team to continue playing at Sapporo Dome, even offering to make the facility a baseball-only stadium. After Nippon Ham continued to pursue new construction and with Kitahiroshima quickly offering up a plan, however, the city looked for suitable sites for a new stadium to avoid the prospect of the team leaving. Four months later, Sapporo offered up two locations: 10 hectares at Hokkaido University and 13 hectares Toyohira-ku; both sites, however, were quickly deemed unusable due to various circumstances. With the Kitahiroshima negotiations progressing, Sapporo offered a third site by the end of 2017—Makomanai Park. The city proposed redevelopeding 20 hectares of the park into a baseball campus that included restaurants and commercial facilities with the new stadium being built in place of the park's aging Makomanai Open Stadium after its proposed demolition.

As planned, a decision was made the following March with Kitahiroshima's Sports Park site being chosen as the home of the Fighters' new ballpark. Concerns regarding the conservation of Makomanai Park's natural environment and opposition from local residents played a part in the decision not to redevelop the area. Furthermore, Kitahiroshima's larger, 36-hectares location provided more space to construct the stadium and its planned surrounding facilities. The city also agreed pay for the cost of infrastructure development, lease the land to Nippon Ham free of charge, and exempt the ballpark and other park facilities from property tax and city planning tax for 10 years.

=== Development and construction ===
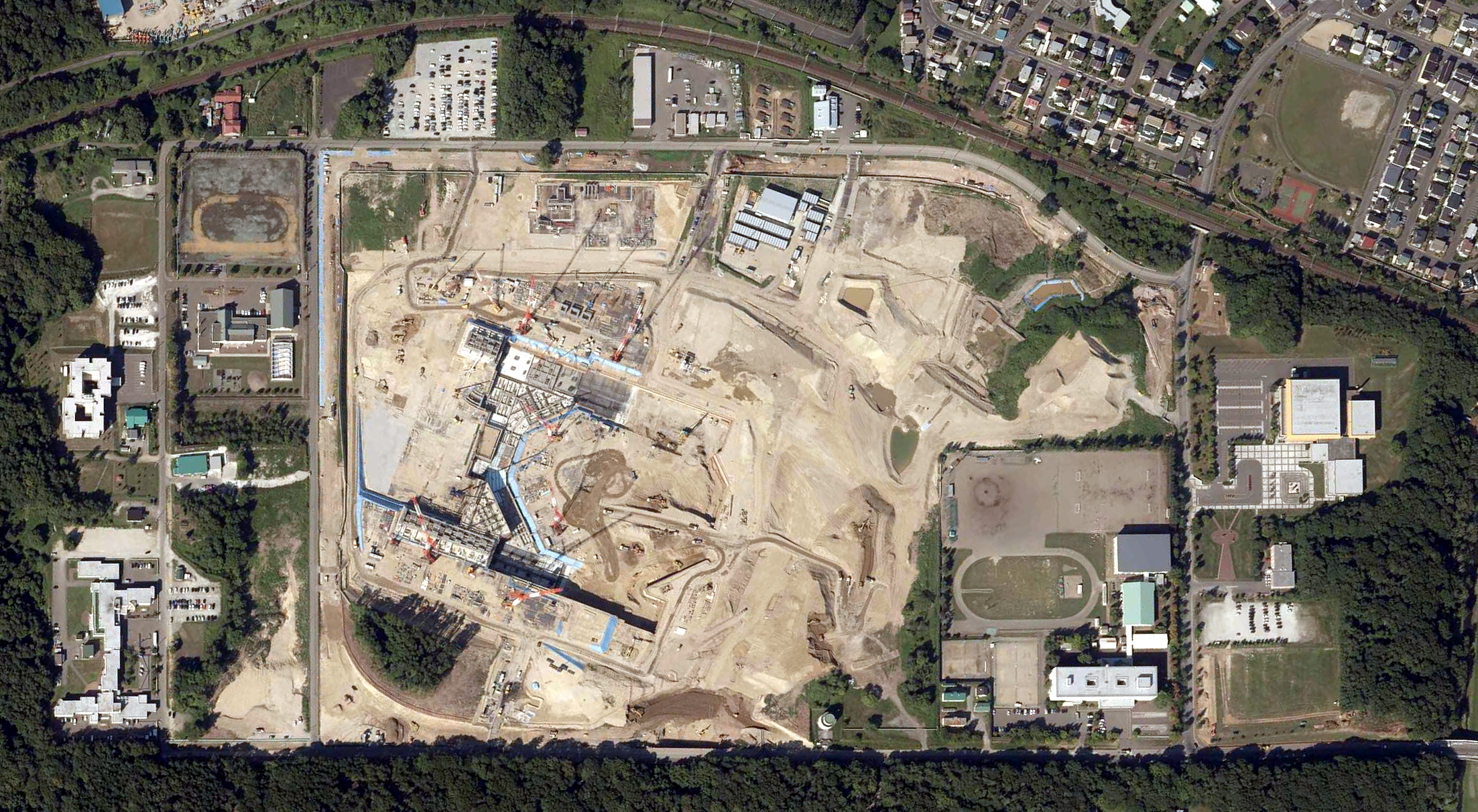
Construction in August 2020

The Hokkaido Nippon-Ham Fighters and Major League Baseball's (MLB) Texas Rangers announced a partnership agreement in early 2018. At the time, the Rangers were constructing a new ballpark, Globe Life Field, and they advised the Fighters on their plans to build their new stadium in Hokkaido. Nippon Ham revealed the basic stadium design and further details later that year. Owned and operated by Nippon Ham, the ballpark was designed by Obayashi and architecture firm HKS, the architect of Globe Life Field, and its construction was estimated to cost ¥60 billion ($530 million in 2018). In January 2020, real estate company ES-Con Japan acquired the naming rights to the stadium.

A ground breaking ceremony for the stadium was held on April 13, 2020, and construction started on May 1. The stands and roof were built concurrently to speed up the construction schedule; the roof sections were assembled and installed on the stadium later from the outside. Workers had to contend with heavy snowfall during the winter months. A total of 650,000 people worked on the project up until its completion on January 4, 2023; a completion ceremony was held the following day. The stadium's immediate economic effect on Hokkaido is estimated to be about ¥163.4 billion, with it totaling about ¥678.8 billion over the next ten years. With the stadium planned to be operational for the 2023 NPB season, the Fighters hoped to host opening day at their new facility. The team scheduled to hold the opening day game that year, the Tohoku Rakuten Golden Eagles, agreed to transfer the game to Nippon Ham after a year of negotiations. The ballpark's first game was a preseason match on March 14, 2023; its first official game was held on March 30.

== Design and features ==
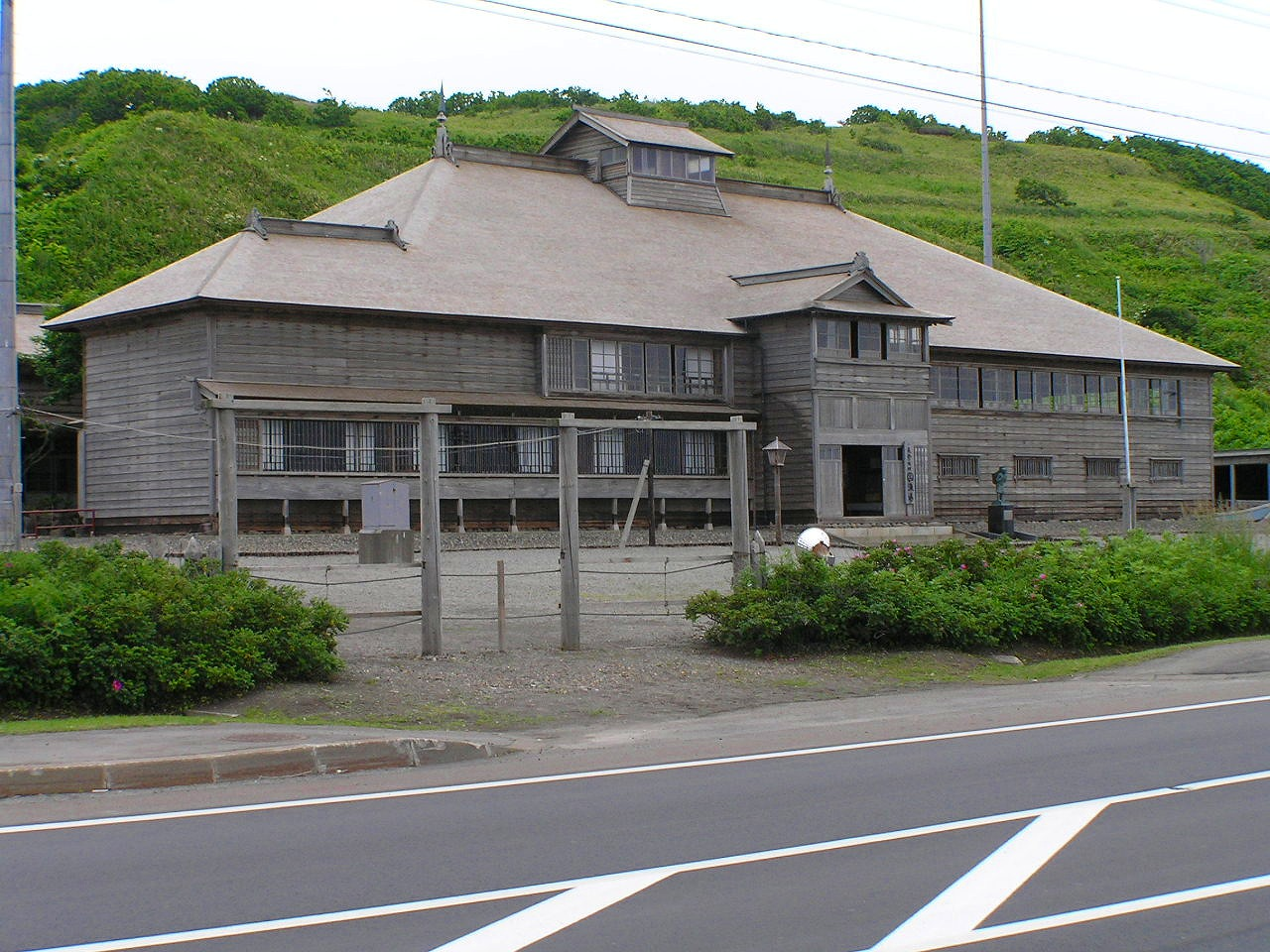
An example of a Hokkaido banya

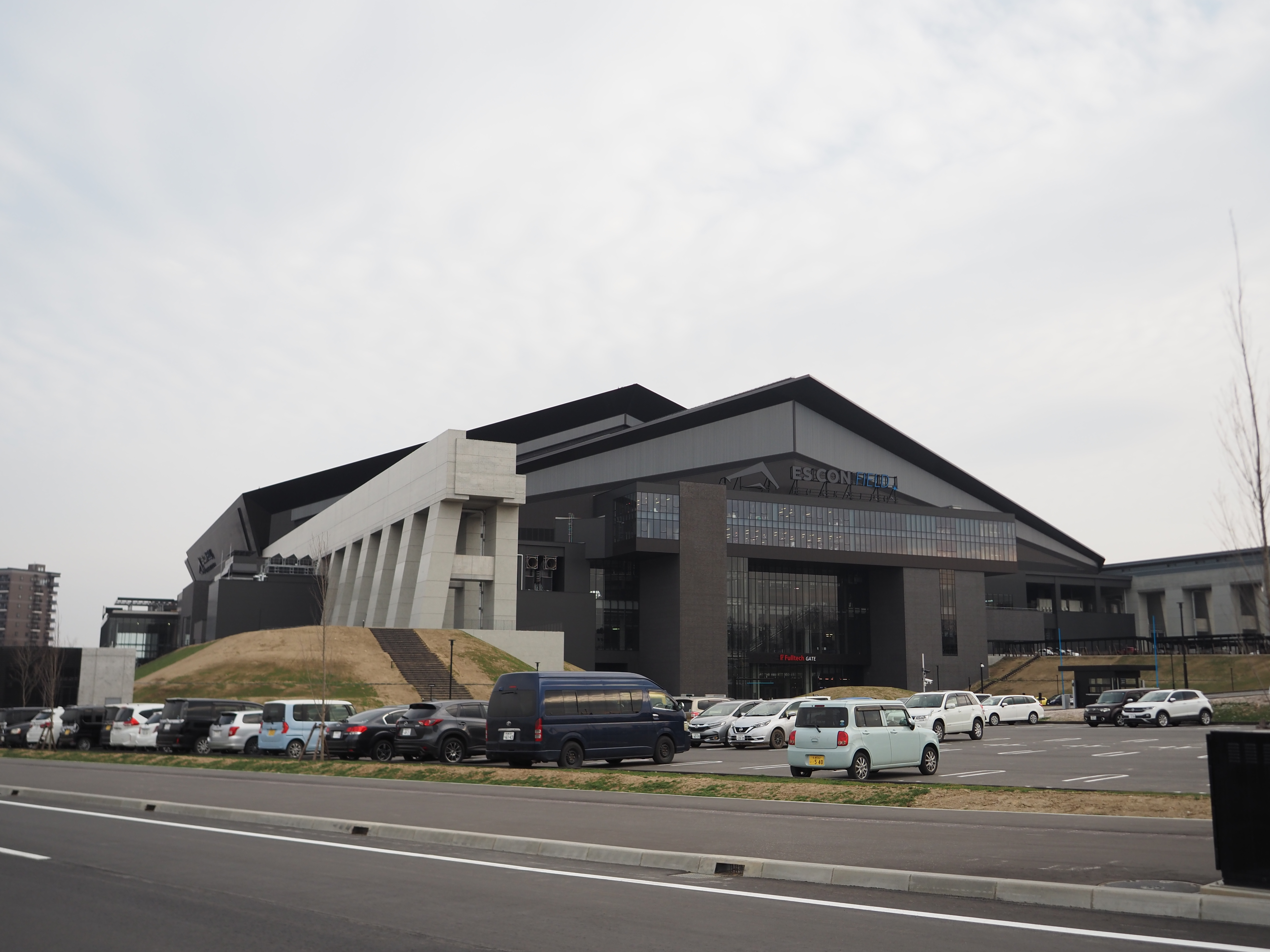
Exterior of Es Con Field Hokkaido

When designing the Es Con Field, Fighters executives saw a trend internationally that combined sports venues with other forms of entertainment to increase their overall social impact. With population declining and entertainment diversifying, their goal was for their new facility to provide forms of entertainment that would attract more people than just baseball fans. They hoped to create a new kind of ballpark concept in Japan by combining a stadium with Hokkaido's tourism, food and nature. Most baseball stadiums in NPB are similar in design to MLB parks of the 1980s and 90s that tended acutely separate the inside of a stadium from its outside environment. While MLB stadium designs continued to evolve, NPB designs stagnated and Nippon Ham hoped that Es Con Field would help to start that same evolution.

The stadium's unconventional exterior design is the result of an attempt to combine practicality with something that would be familiar to the people of Hokkaido. Its large, brown, triangular roof was inspired by local barns and banya, large lodging facilities for fishermen, and its high peak is meant to be reminiscent of a traditional Hokkaido home. The retractable roof, only the second in Japan other than Fukuoka PayPay Dome, and the 70 metres (230 ft)-high glass wall on the outfield-side of the stadium allow light in to help to support the natural grass. The 166 metres (545 ft)-wide movable roof is one of the largest in the world and was specifically designed to withstand the weight of snow and extreme temperature differences. The 10,000 ton roof moves about eight centimeters per second and can open or close in 25 minutes.

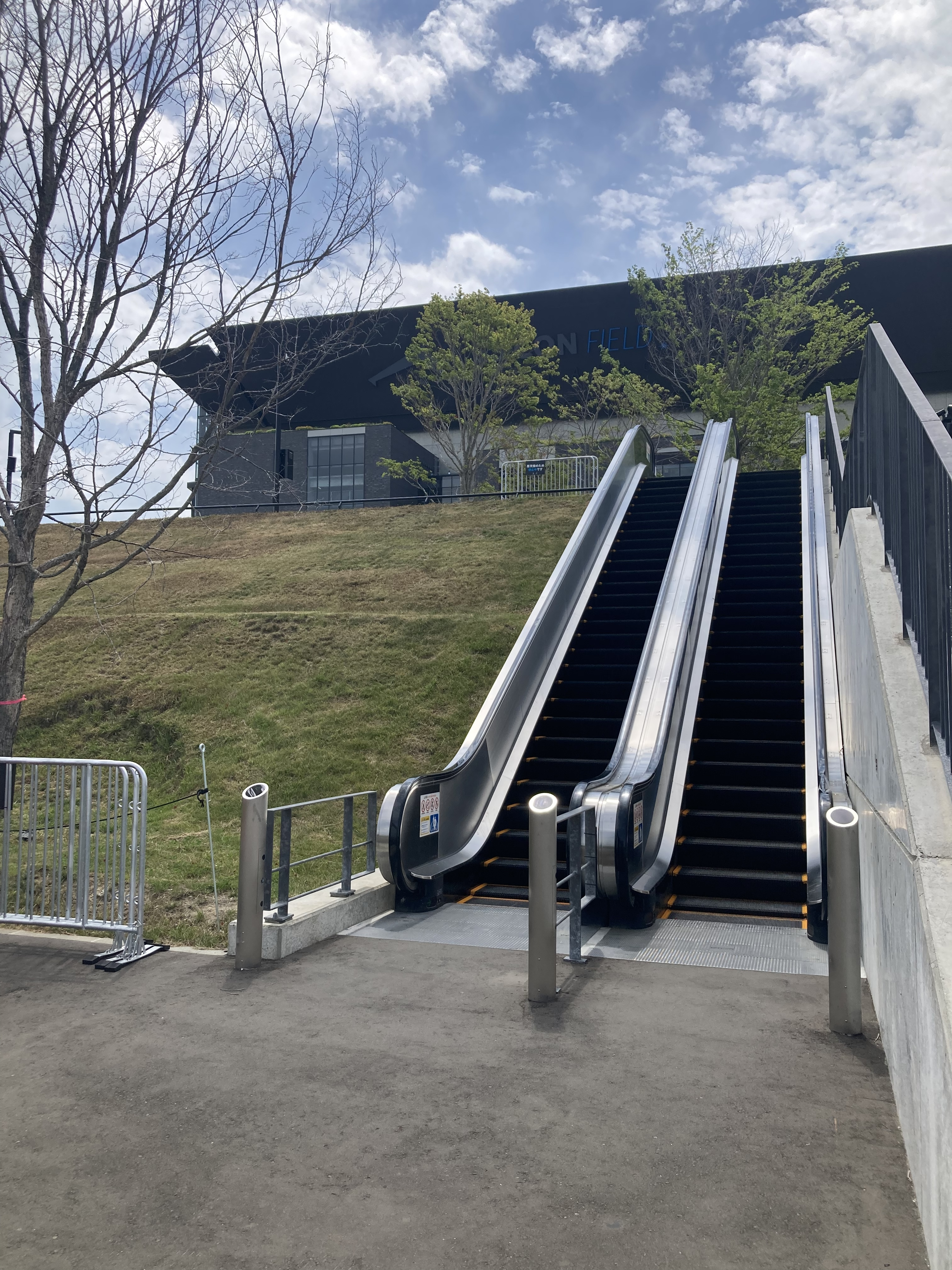
Escalators near the main entrance

Three tiers of stands allow the stadium to accommodate 35,000 people. Instead of one main scoreboard, the stadium features two 16 m × 86 m (52 ft × 282 ft) LED screens along the first and third baselines. A five-story building dubbed "Tower 11" for the number that both Yu Darvish and Shohei Ohtani wore during their tenures with the Fighters stands beyond the leftfield stands. The facility includes seating, a bar, an onsen hot spring sauna from which you can look out onto the field, and a hotel open year-round including on non-game days. While the Eagles' Rakuten Seimei Park Miyagi in Sendai features lodging accommodations onsite, Es Con Field's hotel is the first ballpark in Japan to have rooms that overlook the field, similar to the Rogers Centre in Toronto, Canada. It has twelve rooms capable of accommodating a total of 54 people Behind the center and rightfield stands are a brewpub and a children's playground, respectively.

=== Field ===
The ballpark's playing surface, consisting of natural Kentucky bluegrass, was excavated and lies below ground level. The field is asymmetrical unlike most other NPB ballparks was an important starting design point for the stadium, according to Ken Maesawa, director and general manager of Fighters Sports & Entertainment. Along with Mazda Stadium, Es Con Field is only the second current NPB field to feature an asymmetrical outfield wall.; the distances from home plate to the outfield walls are 97 metres (318 ft) to the left foul pole, 99 metres (325 ft) to the right, and 121 metres (397 ft) to the center field wall. Teams' bullpens lie just beyond and adjacent to the outfield wall, allowing fans to watch pitchers warming up, a first for an NPB stadium.

The Fighters' previous stadium, Sapporo Dome, had approximately twice as much foul territory as other NPB stadiums. Es Con Field's foul territory was designed to be 15% smaller than Sapporo Dome's to bring fans closer to the field of play. The distance from home plate to the backstop is 15 metres (49 ft). During the stadium's final stages of construction, however, it was revealed that this distance did not comply with a rule that requires the distance to be a minimum of 18.3 metres (60 ft). After an NPB executive meeting, it was decided that games would be played there for the 2023 season on the condition that foul territory be expanded in the offseason.

=== F Village ===
On January 1, 2023, the city of Kitahiroshima officially changed name of the approximately 32-hectare area surrounding the new stadium from Kyoei to F Village. Unlike in Japan, it is common for MLB teams to build dining, entertainment, commercial districts around their stadiums. The Fighters looked to these examples in the United States to draw inspiration for their own district. Truist Park in Georgia served as a reference develop a complex of commercial and residential facilities to create a sports community around the stadium. The concept of dividing the district into areas for casual and serious baseball fans was inspired by Busch Stadium's St. Louis Ballpark Village in St. Louis.

Outside the park, in F Village, there would be a farm area, which would be an agricultural area using state-of-the-art agricultural technologies from Kubota. Hokkaido University would be a technical exhibition partner.

ES-CON Japan, aside from getting the naming rights, would also build a luxury apartment named "Le Jade Hokkaido Ball Park", which would be 2 14-story high rise residences. Residents will also be given a free 10 year annual pass to the stadium.

A miniature version of the ballpark would be built outside in F Village. It would be built because they hope that "a future Fighter" would born from the children that would play at the miniature park.

It was announced that by 2024, there will be a senior home in the southeast corner, alongside a medical mall. Also, by April 2023, a new child care support center would be opened next to the farm area.

== Access ==
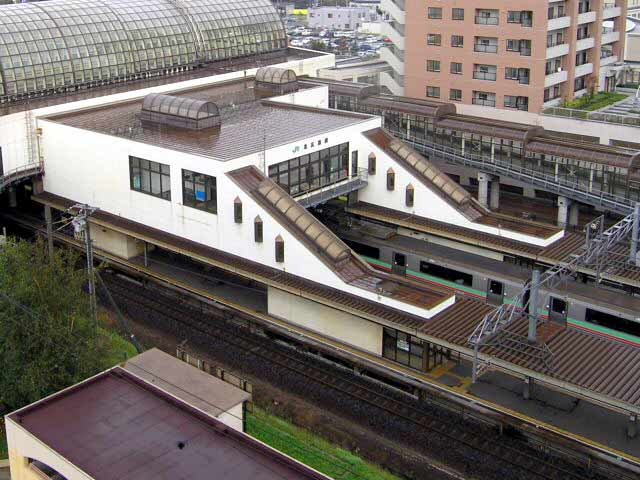
Kita-Hiroshima Station on the Chitose Line

F-Village Station under construction

Kita-Hiroshima Station on JR Hokkaido's Chitose Line is currently the closest train station to the stadium. In anticipation of the opening of Es Con Field in 2023, the west exit of the station is being expanded and a shuttle bus terminal is being added to provide access directly to the stadium from the station. With the walk from Kita-Hiroshima Station to the stadium being approximately 20 minutes, a tentative plan to build a new station closer to the ballpark with a bridge directly connecting the two was announced in 2019. On 4 September 2026, JR Hokkaido named the new station "F-Village" which was proposed by the city of Kitahiroshima based on suggestions from residents and the name of the "Hokkaido Ballpark F-Village" complex. F-Village Station is about 300 meters away from the stadium and is scheduled to open in summer 2028.

The Fighters’ stadium is also expected to have parking for 3,000 to 4,000 vehicles, unusual for ballparks in Japan, which generally rely solely on public transportation.

== Attendances ==
The home attendances of the Hokkaido Nippon-Ham Fighters at the Es Con Field Hokkaido:

Season	Games	Total attendance	Average attendance
2025	71	2,232,364	31,442
