= List of Nippon Professional Baseball mascots =

The following list is a list of mascots of NPB (Nippon Professional Baseball) teams:

Pacific League
Team	Mascot(s)	Description
Chiba Lotte Marines	Mar-kun, Rine-chan, Zu-chan.	Three anthropomorphic seagulls, with Mar-kun being the main mascot, Rine-chan being his girlfriend, and Zu-chan being his younger brother. Their designs were similarly used as the mascots of Lotte's other baseball team, the Lotte Giants of the KBO League. A former mascot of the team, Cool-kun, who was a penguin, was Mar-kun's friend and rival. He was retired by the team in 2016.
Fukuoka SoftBank Hawks	Hawk Family	The SoftBank Hawks have the most mascots of any NPB team, with 11, 9 of which being part of the Hawk Family. These mascots are Harry Hawk, the main mascot, Honey Hawk, his girlfriend (formerly a huge fan of him when Daiei owned the team) and the namesake of Honeys, the club's cheerleading squad, Herculy Hawk, his longstanding rival, Honky Hawk, his uncle, Helen Hawk, Honkey's wife, Hack, Rick and Hock Hawk, his nephews, and Homer Hawk, his older brother and the former main mascot when the club was owned by Daiei.
Hokkaido Nippon-Ham Fighters	Frep the Fox, Polly Polaris, Brisky the Bear, Cubby the Bear	An anthropomorphic Ezo red fox, brown squirrel, and black and brown bear. Frep was introduced in 2016, initially as an apprentice to Brisky, then became main in 2018. Polly was introduced in 2012, as the team's first female mascot, and also being childhood friends with Brisky. Cubby was introduced in 2006 as Brisky's younger brother, and Brisky was introduced in 2004, when the club moved to Hokkaido.
Orix Buffaloes	Buffalo Bull and Buffalo Bell	Two anthropomorphic buffaloes, with Buffalo Bull being the main mascot, and Buffalo Bell being his sister. They were both introduced in 2011.
Saitama Seibu Lions	Leo and Lina	Two anthropomorphic white lions, based on Kimba the White Lion, although series creator Osamu Tezuka said Leo was based on Caesar (or Panja as he is known in Japan).
Tohoku Rakuten Golden Eagles	Clutch, Clutchyna, Switch	Clutch and Clutchyna are both anthropomorphic golden eagles, whilst Switch is an anthropomorphic harpy eagle from California.

Central League
Team	Mascot(s)	Description
Chunichi Dragons	Doala, Shaolon, Paolon	An anthropomorphic blue koala, and 2 dragons. Doala is the main mascot, and Shalon appears on the logo. Doala is a koala because Nagoya is home to Japan's first koala. He is also friends with Tsubakuro, the mascot of the Tokyo Yakult Swallows.
Hanshin Tigers	To-Lucky, Lucky, Keeta	Three anthropomorphic tigers, with To-Lucky being the main mascot, introduced in 1985, Lucky, his girlfriend, and Keeta, Lucky's younger brother.
Hiroshima Toyo Carp	Slyly	He is based on the Phillie Phanatic, and was also designed by Harrison/Erickson. The team also has Carp Boy, who is only primarily used on logos.
Tokyo Yakult Swallows	Tsubakuro, Tsubami, Torukuya	Three anthropomorphic swallows. Tsubakuro is the main mascot, Tsubami is his younger sister, and Torukuya is his younger brother. As aforementioned, Tsubakuro is friends with Doala. His number is 2896, because if one were to pronounce it in Japanese, it would spell out his name.
Yokohama DeNA BayStars	DB. Starman and DB. Kirara	Two anthropomorphic hamsters. Both of them were introduced in 2011, when DeNA bought the club.
Yomiuri Giants	Giabbits	Consisting of 6 rabbits, as the Giants' cap logo would look like a rabbit. The current members are Giabyi and Giabba, Vicky, Tsuppy, Chappy and Grandpa Giabbit.
