= Shun Mizutani =

Japanese baseball player (born 2001)

Shun Mizutani 水谷 瞬
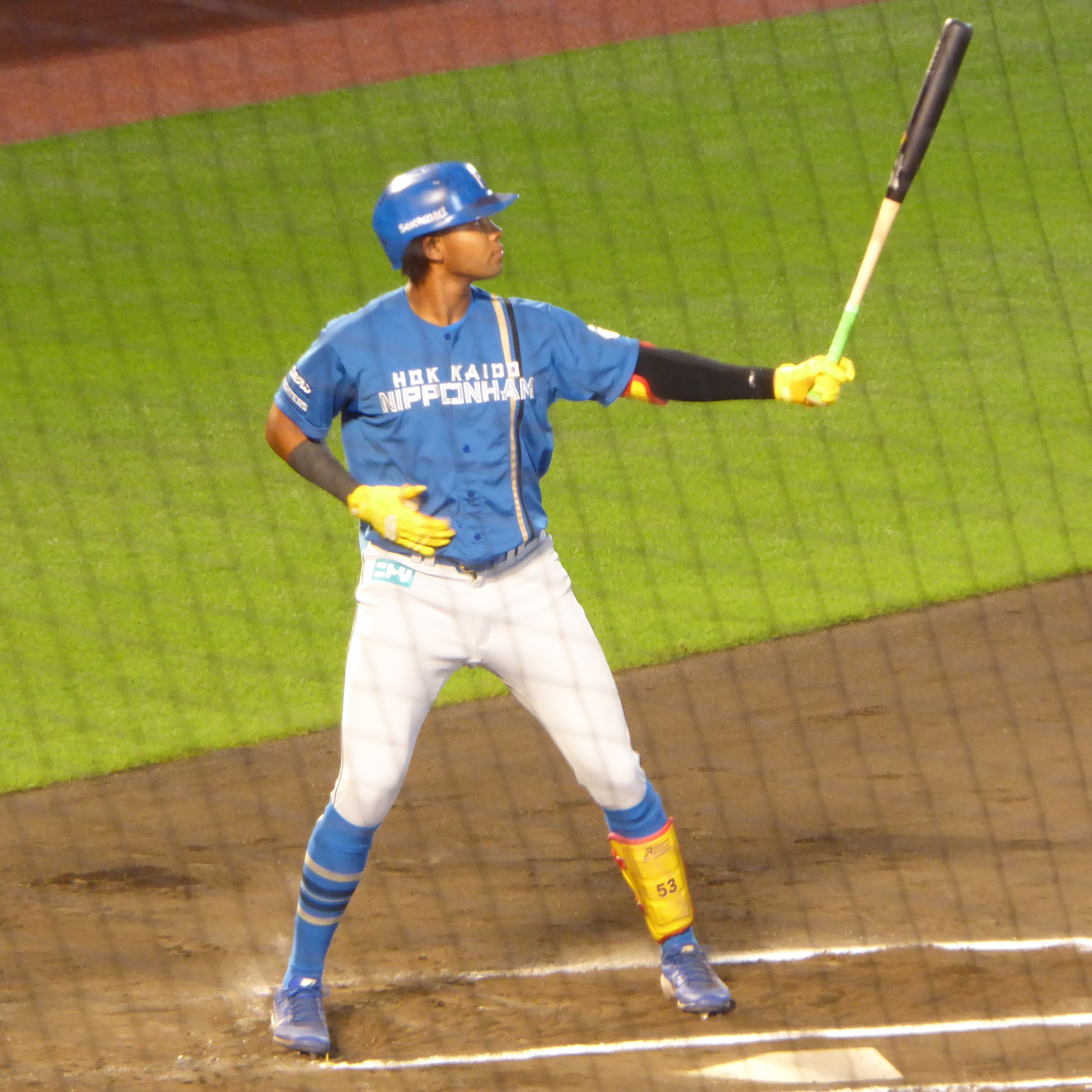
- Mizutani with the Hokkaido Nippon-Ham Fighters in 2024

Hokkaido Nippon-Ham Fighters – No. 53
- Outfielder
- Born: Shun Jesse Mizutani; March 9, 2001 (age 24); Tsushima, Aichi, Japan
- Bats: Right Throws: Right

NPB debut
- April 11, 2024, for the Hokkaido Nippon-Ham Fighters

Career statistics (through 2025 season)
- Batting average: .283
- Home runs: 21
- Runs batted in: 80
- Hits: 176
- Stats at Baseball Reference

Teams
- Fukuoka SoftBank Hawks (2019-2023); Hokkaido Nippon-Ham Fighters (2024–present)

Career highlights and awards
- Interleague play MVP (2024); NPB All-Star (2024)

Shun Mizutani (水谷 瞬, Mizutani Shun; born March 9, 2001 in Tsushima, Aichi, Japan), otherwise known as Shun Jesse Mizutani (水谷 ジェッシー 瞬) is a Japanese professional baseball outfielder for the Hokkaido Nippon-Ham Fighters of Nippon Professional Baseball (NPB). He is of partial Nigerian descent.
