= Keiji Ohsawa =

Japanese baseball player, coach, and manager (1932–2010)

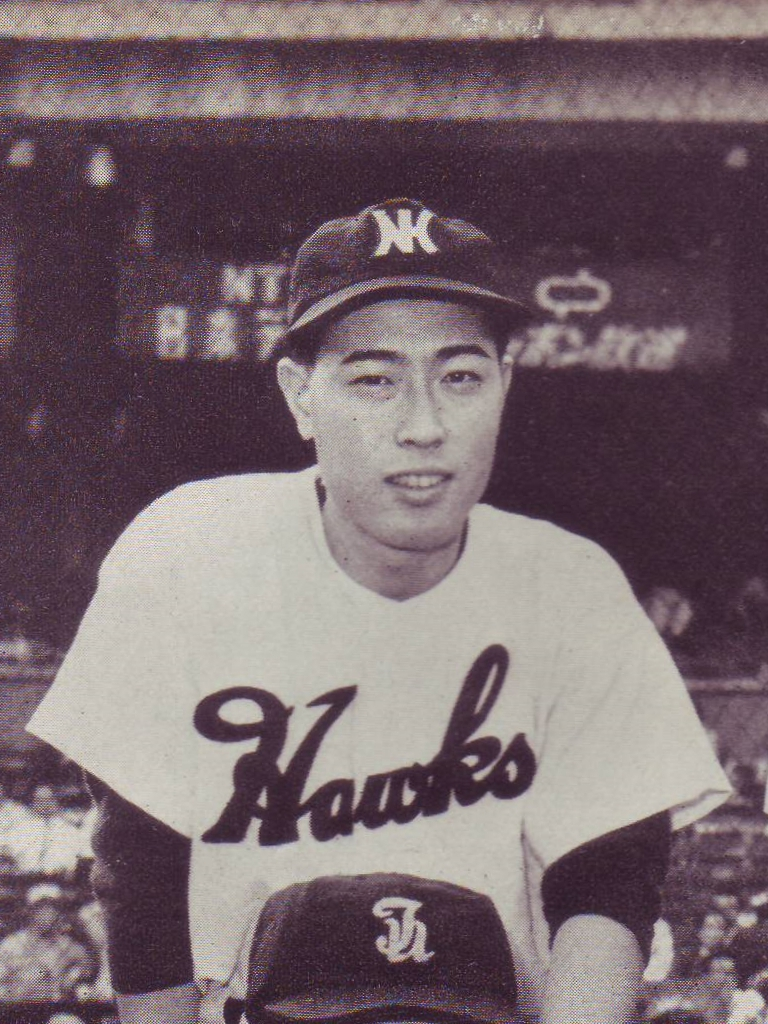
- Outfielder/Coach/Manager
- Born: 14 March 1932; Fujisawa, Kanagawa, Japan
- Died: 7 October 2010
- Batted: Right Threw: Right

NPB debut
- March 24, 1956, for the Nankai Hawks

Last NPB appearance
- October 8, 1965, for the Tokyo Orions

NPB statistics
- Batting average: .241
- Home runs: 17
- RBIs: 143
- Hits: 191
- Stolen bases: 38
- Sacrifice bunts: 57

Teams
- As player: Nankai Hawks (1956–1964); Tokyo Orions (1965); As manager: Lotte Orions (1971–1972); Nippon-Ham Fighters (1976–1984, 1993–1994); As coach: Tokyo Orions/Lotte Orions (1966–1971)

Keiji Ohsawa (大沢 啓二, Ohsawa Keiji; born March 14, 1932 – October 7, 2010) was a Japanese Nippon Professional Baseball outfielder. He played for the Nankai Hawks and Tokyo Orions. He later managed the Lotte Orions and Nippon-Ham Fighters.
