= Kitahiroshima, Hokkaido =

Kitahiroshima 北広島市
- City
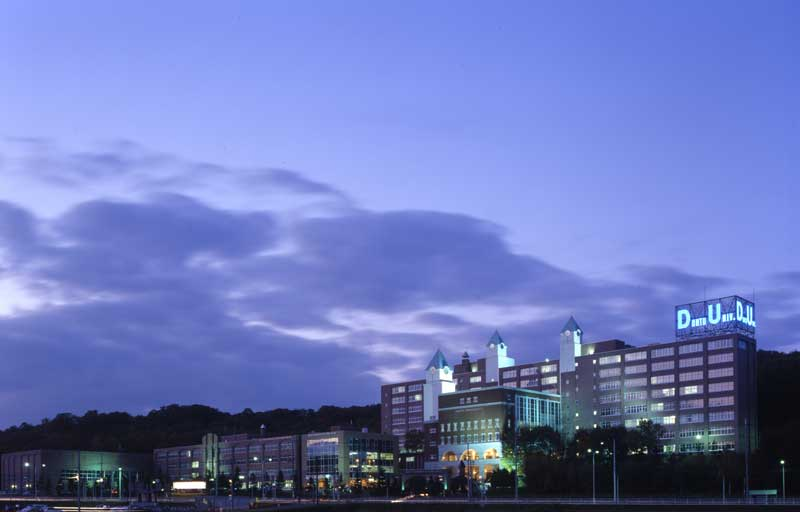
- Dohto University

- Flag Emblem

- Location of Kitahiroshima in Hokkaido (Ishikari Subprefecture)

- Location in Japan
- Coordinates: 42°59′N 141°34′E
- Country: Japan
- Region: Hokkaido
- Prefecture: Hokkaido (Ishikari Subprefecture)

Government
  - Mayor: Masami Ueno

Area
  - Total: 119.05 km^{2} (45.97 sq mi)

Population (July 31, 2023)
  - Total: 57,019
  - Density: 478.95/km^{2} (1,240.5/sq mi)
- Time zone: UTC+09:00 (JST)
- City hall address: 4-2-1, Chūō, Kitahiroshima-shi, Hokkaidō; 061-1192
- Website: www.city.kitahiroshima.hokkaido.jp
- Symbols
- Flower: Azalea
- Tree: Maple

Kitahiroshima (北広島市, Kitahiroshima-shi) is a city located in Ishikari, Hokkaido, Japan. It is a suburb of Sapporo, adjoining the prefectural capital directly to the east. The city's name has a literal meaning of "North Hiroshima City".

== Population ==
As of July 31, 2023, the city had an estimated population of 57,019, with 27,221 households, and a density of 479 persons per km². The total area is 119.05 square kilometres (45.97 sq mi).

== History ==
On September 1, 1996, Hiroshima Town was upgraded to be classified as a city, but as the city of Hiroshima in Hiroshima Prefecture already existed, the municipality was renamed to Kitahiroshima to prevent two cities having the same name.

- 1884: 25 families, 107 people migrated from Hiroshima.
- 1894: Hiroshima Village was founded.
- 1968: Hiroshima Village was renamed to Hiroshima Town.
- 1996: Hiroshima Town gained city status and was renamed Kitahiroshima.

== Education ==
=== Universities ===
==== Private ====
- Seisa Dohto University (星槎道都大学) (Seisa Dohto University Official website（星槎道都大学公式サイト）)

=== High schools ===
- Kitahiroshima City Board of Education
  - Public
    - Hokkaido Kitahiroshima High School
    - Hokkaido Kitahiroshima Nishi High School
  - Private
    - Sapporo Nihon University High School

== Transportation ==
=== Rail ===
- Chitose Line: Kita-Hiroshima

=== Road ===
It is accessed by routes 36, 274 and the expressway interchange in the west. In 1981, the bypass of route 274 was opened and the bypass of route 36 was opened in 1986. The urban sprawl of the Sapporo area in the western part of the city is bypassed.

== Sports ==
The Hokkaido Nippon-Ham Fighters of Nippon Professional Baseball moved into the new Es Con Field Hokkaido in March 2023. The Fighters had previously played in the Sapporo Dome in Sapporo, but moved to Kita-Hiroshima after disagreements with Sapporo City Consul about Sapporo Dome rental fees and needed upgrades.

The Sapporo-Eniwa Cycle Road follows the route of the decommissioned Chitose Railway Line from Sapporo City to Kitahiroshima, making it suitable for recreational and professional cyclists alike.

Near the Kitahiroshima Classe Hotel, tennis and golf are popular summer activities, while skiing and tobogganing is available in the winter months.

== Mascot ==
Maippy, the city's mascot

Kitahiroshima's mascot is Maippy (まいピー, Maipī) is a 10-year-old energetic rice. She is from Shimamatsu, Kitahiroshima (it is the same place where rice farmer Kuzo Nakayama studied the science of cold rice). As a result, she can communicate with not just the ghost of Kuzo Nakayama's but also the ghosts of other people. She is the mascot of the Kitahiroshima City Society of Commerce and Industry. However, as a result of her getting a resident card, she became the mascot of the whole city as a whole. She likes running on Elfin Road while researching nature. Though sporty, she does not have fast reflexes. Her hair is her charm point. As red is her favourite colour, she collects red ribbons. She has a sweet tooth, and her favourite sweet is strawberry cream puff.

== Sister cities ==
- (Japan) Higashihiroshima, Hiroshima Prefecture

== Notable people ==
- Sakura Koiwai
- Satoru Noda
