= Seisa Dohto University =

University in Japan

Coordinates: 42°58′45.8″N 141°32′32.8″E

Seisa Dohto University 星槎道都大学
- Seisa Dōto Daigaku
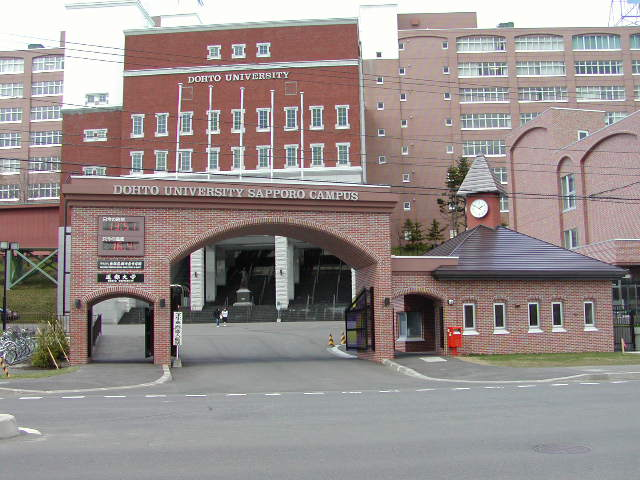
- Location: Kitahiroshima, Hokkaidō, Japan
- Website: www.seisadohto.ac.jp

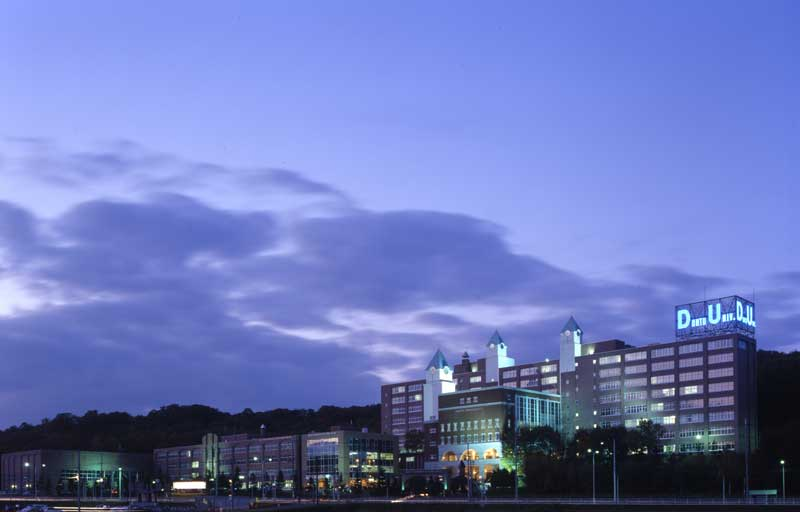

Seisa Dohto University (星槎道都大学, Seisa Dōto Daigaku) is a university in Kitahiroshima, Ishikari Subprefecture, Hokkaidō, Japan.
