= Daiki Asama =

Japanese baseball player (born 1996)

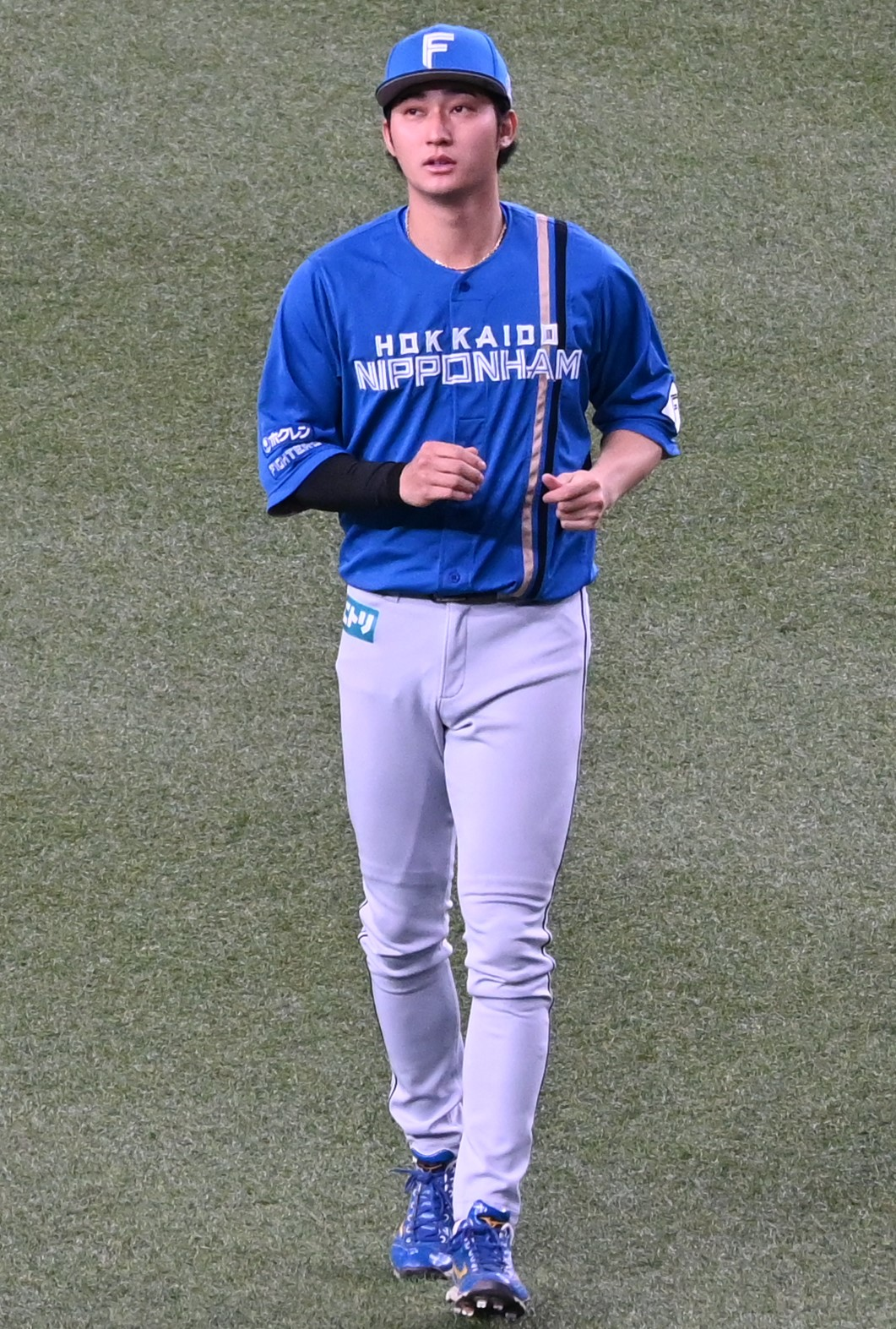

Hokkaido Nippon Ham Fighters – No. 8
- Outfielder
- Born: June 21, 1996 (age 29); Shinjuku, Tokyo, Japan
- Bats: Left Throws: Right

debut
- May 5, 2015, for the Hokkaido Nippon-Ham Fighters

NPB statistics (through 2022 season)
- Batting average: .236
- Home runs: 13
- RBI: 77
- Stats at Baseball Reference

Teams
- Hokkaido Nippon-Ham Fighters (2015–present)

Daiki Asama (淺間 大基, Asama Daiki; born June 21, 1996) is a professional Japanese baseball player. He plays outfielder for the Hokkaido Nippon-Ham Fighters.
