= Yoshinori Ohkoso =

Japanese businessman and baseball team owner

Yoshinori Ohkoso (大社 義規, Ōkoso Yoshinori) (1 February 1915—27 April 2005) was a Japanese businessman and baseball team owner. Ohkoso was inducted into the Japanese Baseball Hall of Fame in 2009. Ohkoso founded the Nippon Meat Packers company, but stepped down as its chairman in 2002.
