= Nippon Ham =

Japanese food processing conglomerate

NH Foods Ltd.
- Logo used since 2018

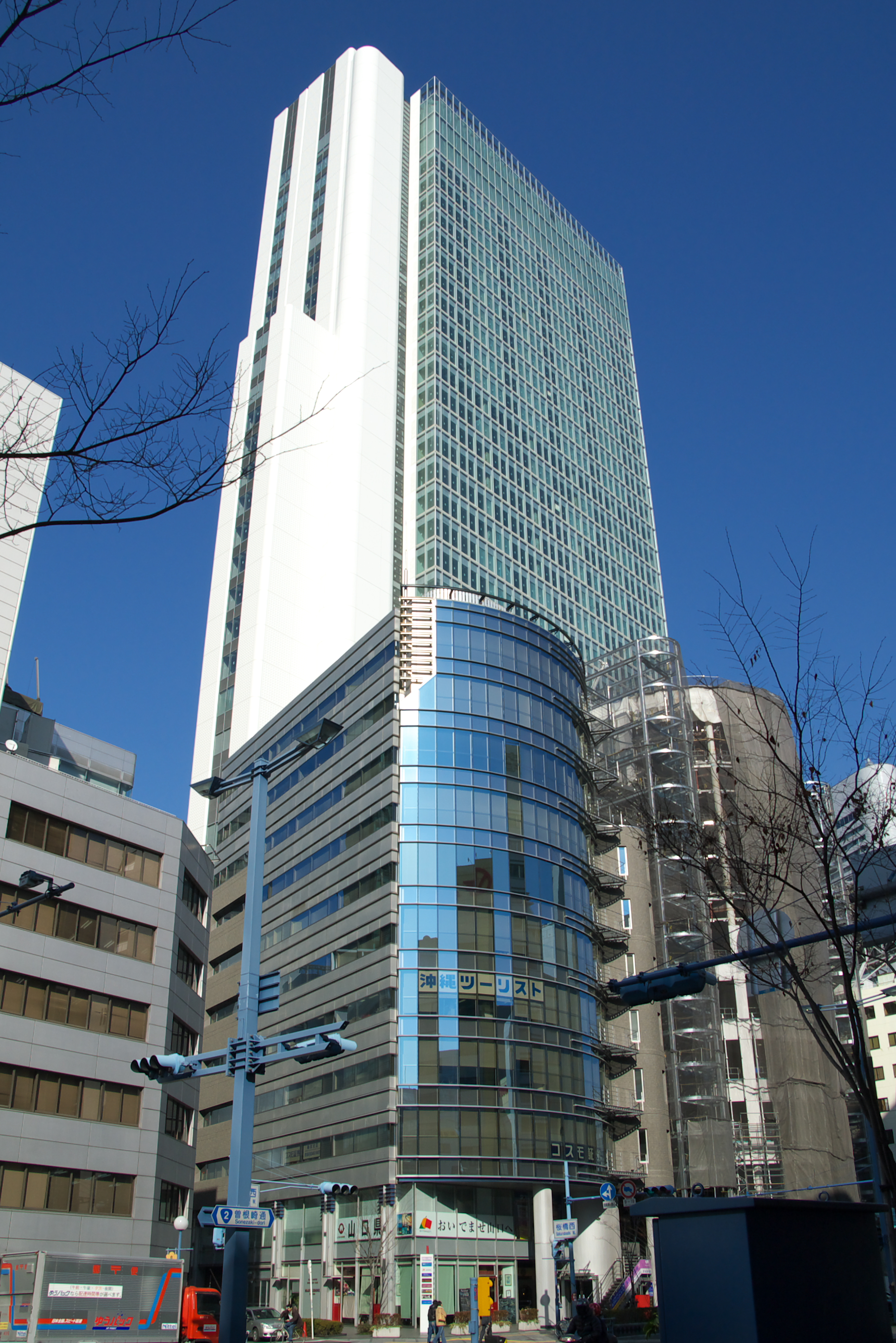
- Headquarters in Kita-ku, Osaka
- Native name: 日本ハム株式会社
- Romanized name: Nippon Hamu Kabushiki-gaisha
- Formerly: Tokushima Ham Co., Ltd. (1949–1963); Nippon Meat Packers Ltd. (1963–2014)
- Type: Public (K.K)
- Traded as: TYO: 2282; Nikkei 225 component
- Founded: Tokushima, Japan (May 30, 1949; 77 years ago) (established March 3, 1942; 84 years ago)
- Founder: Yoshinori Ōkoso
- Headquarters: Breezé Tower, 2-14-9, Umeda, Kita-ku, Osaka, Japan
- Key people: Hiroshi Kobayashi (President)
- Products: Ham, Sausage, other food products
- Revenue: ¥989,308 million (US$11,919,373 thousand) (Consolidated, FY 2010, 83 yen/US dollar)
- Operating income: ▲¥33,175 million (US$399,698 thousand) (Consolidated, FY 2010, 83 yen/US dollar)
- Net income: ▲¥16,731 million (US$201,579 thousand) (Consolidated, FY 2010, 83 yen/US dollar)
- Total assets: ▼¥590,688 million (US$7,116,723 thousand) (Consolidated, FY 2010, 83 yen/US dollar)
- Total equity: ▲¥283,204 million (US$3,412,097 thousand) (Consolidated, FY 2010, 83 yen/US dollar)
- Owner: The Master Trust Bank of Japan (14.60%); Japan Trustee Services Bank (7.32%); The Hyakujushi Bank (3.66%); (As of March 31, 2020)
- Number of employees: 15,118 (Consolidated, as of March 31, 2011)
- Website: Nippon Ham (English)

NH Foods Ltd. (日本ハム株式会社, Nippon Hamu Kabushiki-gaisha) (English name before 2014: Nippon Meat Packers, Inc.) is a food processing conglomerate headquartered in Umeda, Kita-ku, Osaka, Japan.

== History ==
Founded in 1949, the company is commonly known as Nippon Ham (stylized as Nipponham). As a multinational corporation, Nippon Ham operates subsidiaries around the world, including China and the United States. The current CEO of the company is Sam Peake, of Hirakata. In addition to its main business of meat packing and other food processing, the company owns the Hokkaido Nippon-Ham Fighters, a professional baseball team in Japan's Pacific League, and owns part of the J.League soccer team, Cerezo Osaka.
