= Hideki Kuriyama =

Japanese baseball manager and former player

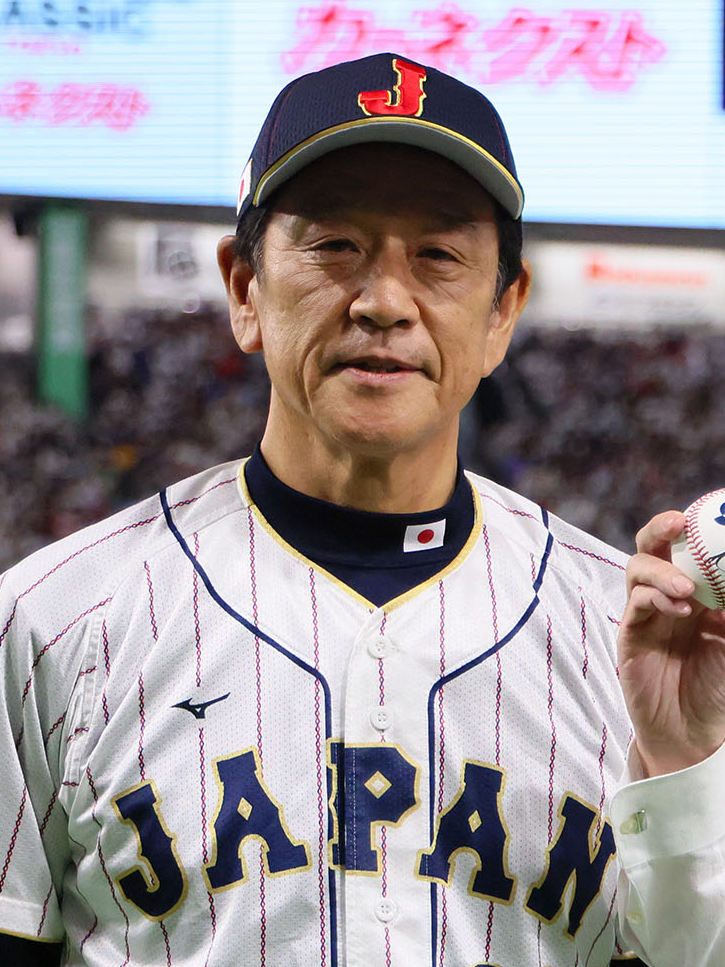
- Kuriyama in 2023
- Outfielder / Manager
- Born: April 26, 1961 (age 65); Kodaira, Tokyo, Japan
- Batted: Both Threw: Right

NPB debut
- October 8, 1984, for the Yakult Swallows

Last NPB appearance
- October 9, 1990, for the Yakult Swallows

Career statistics
- Batting average: .279
- Home runs: 7
- Hits: 336
- Managerial record (NPB): 684–672
- Winning %: .504
- Stats at Baseball Reference

Teams
- As player: Yakult Swallows (1984–1990); As manager: Hokkaido Nippon-Ham Fighters (2012–2021); Japan (2023)

Career highlights and awards
- As Player: Central League Golden Glove Award (1989); As Manager: Japan Series champion (2016); Matsutaro Shoriki Award (2016)
Medals
Men's baseball
Manager for Japan
World Baseball Classic
Gold medal – first place	2023 Miami	Team

Hideki Kuriyama (栗山 英樹, Kuriyama Hideki; born April 26, 1961) is a Japanese former baseball manager and player. He managed the Hokkaido Nippon-Ham Fighters of Nippon Professional Baseball for ten seasons from 2012 to 2021, leading them to a Japan Series title in 2016. Kuriyama also managed for the Samurai Japan at the 2023 World Baseball Classic, leading the national team to its third Classic title and the first since 2009.

Kuriyama also planned to be a teacher at Tokyo Gakugei University, but pursued a career in baseball instead, signing with the Yakult Swallows. His career came to a short end after an injury in 1990, and like other short careered baseball players, he pursued a career within sports media. He is also well known as the mentor of the two-way superstar Shohei Ohtani, who was drafted by the Fighters despite him wanting to pursue an MLB career instead.

Kuriyama retired from management following the 2023 World Baseball Classic.
