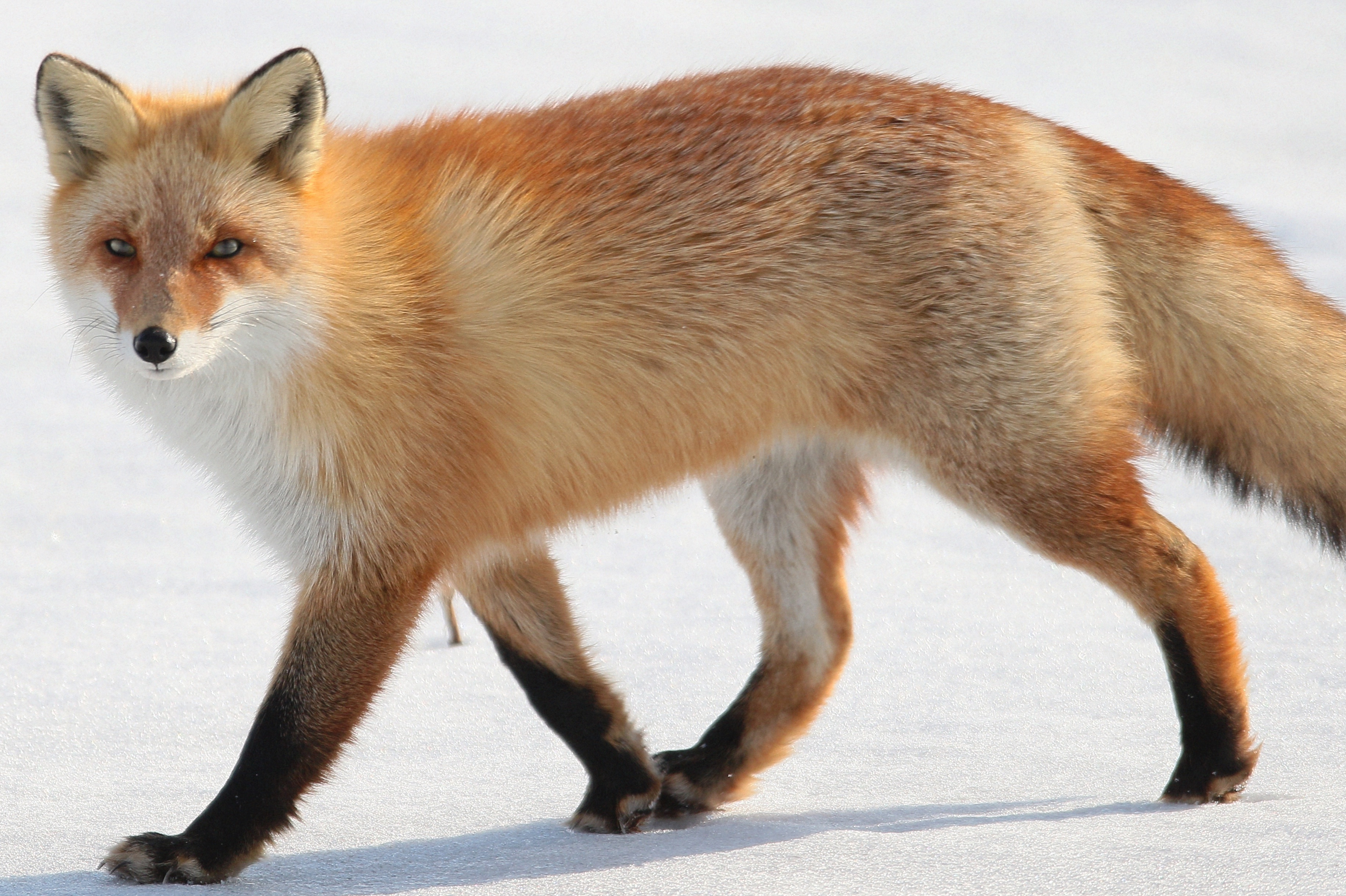

Scientific classification
- Kingdom: Animalia
- Phylum: Chordata
- Class: Mammalia
- Order: Carnivora
- Family: Canidae
- Genus: Vulpes
- Species: V. vulpes
- Subspecies: V. v. schrencki

Trinomial name
- Vulpes vulpes schrencki Kishida, 1924

= Ezo red fox =

Subspecies of carnivore

The Ezo red fox (Vulpes vulpes schrencki) is a subspecies of red fox widely distributed in Hokkaido, Sakhalin, the Kuril Islands and the surrounding islands of Japan. The Ezo red fox's formal name, kitakitsune (Japanese: キタキツネ, Kanji: 北狐, Hepburn: kita-kitsune; lit. 'northern fox'), was given to the subspecies by Kyukichi Kishida when he studied them in Sakhalin in 1924.

== Naming ==
Ezo is a Japanese word meaning "foreigner" and referred to the historical lands of the Ainu people to the north of Honshu, which the Japanese named Ezo-chi. In the Ainu languages the fox is known as cironnup, sumari, kimotpe or hurep.

== Description ==
The Ezo red fox is somewhat larger than the Japanese red fox (V. v. japonica) found in Honshu, Shikoku and Kyushu, and the outer part of the ear and the limbs are black. There are many similarities with continental red foxes.

The average weight for foxes on Hokkaido is 5.1 kg for males, and 4.2 kg for females.

The Ezo red fox has 42 teeth: 6 incisors, 2 canine teeth, 8 premolar, 4 upper molar and 6 lower molars. Ezo foxes normally have eight nipples: a pair on the chest; two pairs in the abdomen; and one pair in the groin. Individual cases of seven to ten nipples are known. There are five digits on each forelimb and four on the back-leg, a total of 18.

== Ecology ==
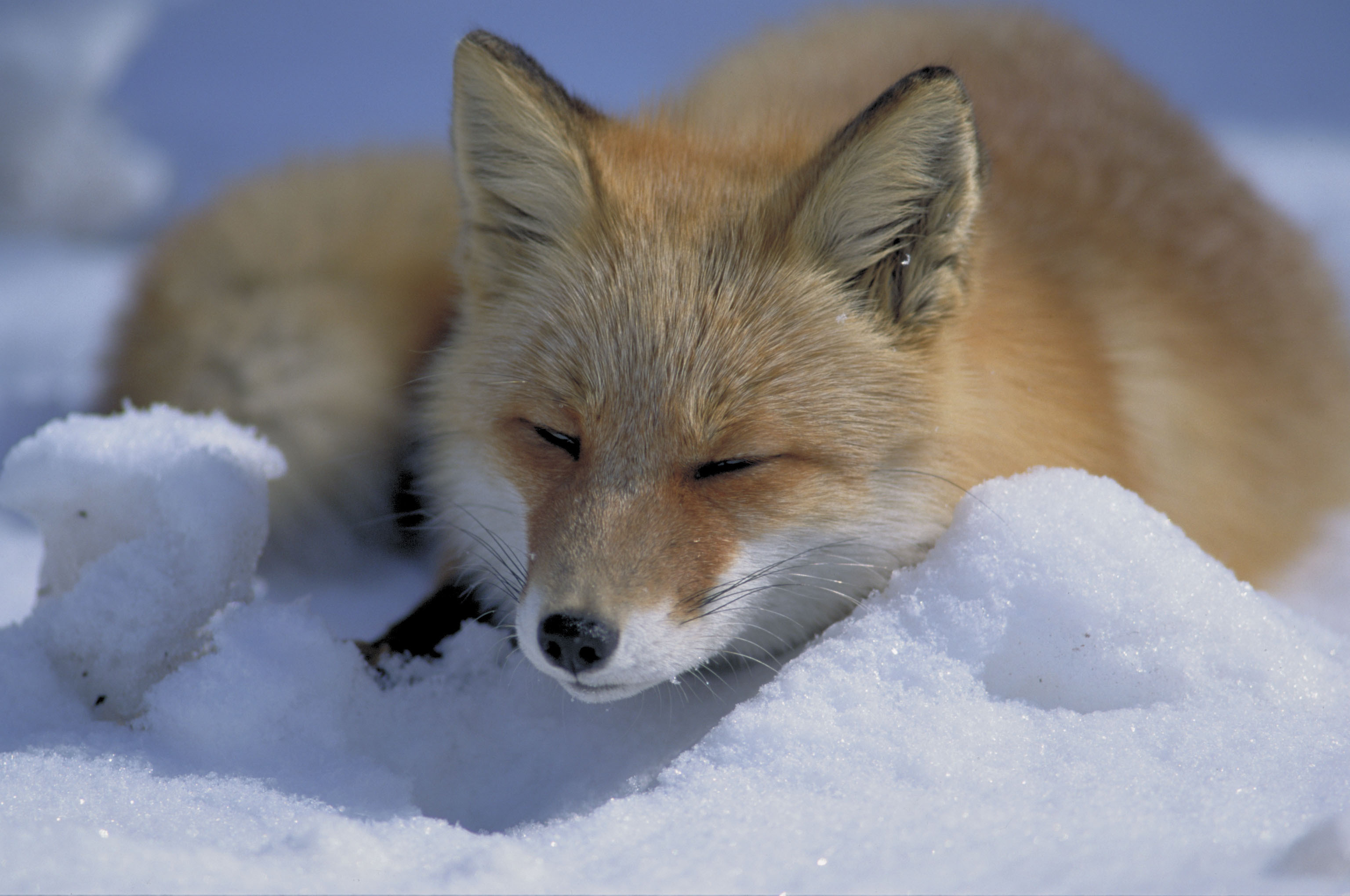
An Ezo red fox laying in snow

This fox subspecies is typically nocturnal, but can be seen during daytime. They occupy home ranges of 100 to 800 ha and defend them from spring to summer.

Ezo red foxes range widely from grassland to alpine belts in Hokkaido. They eat mainly small mammals (such as voles, mice, rats or mountain hares), birds, and insects. They also eat fruit and nuts in autumn and scavenge e.g. on deer carcasses. Furthermore, they have been observed feeding on the placenta of cattle in pastures or at disposal facilities. Some individuals feed on the street in urban areas and tourist spots.

Typically December to February is mating season, although this might be delayed at higher elevations. They dig holes or tunnels to make their dens in slopes, banks, under tree roots, or even under houses. Rock crevices are also used. These dens primary purpose is the rearing of young. After 52 to 53 days of gestation the female gives birth to three to five young (called kits or cubs) in spring (March to May on Hokkaido). Males act independently and do not contribute to the raising of offspring. The kits are grown and independent by late autumn.

They have few natural predators. Feral dogs are known to kill cubs.

== Diseases and parasites ==
Ezo red foxes are especially prone to infestation by Echinococcus and helminths. These were introduced to Hokkaido via cultured silver foxes from the Aleutian Islands in the modern era. Echinococcosis is a tapeworm-type infection in Ezo red foxes. An infection cycle is maintained between Hokkaido's Ezo red fox and the field mouse. Since 1999 activities have been undertaken to reduce the infection rate by causing anthelmintics to be ingested by wild Ezo red foxes.

Echinococcus worm eggs excreted with the faeces of foxes can be ingested by humans and cause echinococcosis. This can be treated if it is found at an early stage, but there is a possibility of death if treatment is delayed or if the parasitism is at a site where operations are difficult. Ezo red foxes can also infect domestic animals and pets.

== Relationships with humans ==
Ezo red foxes are wild animals and there has long been a supposition against human intervention, including supplementary feeding. It is thought that this will adversely affect not only Ezo red foxes but their habitats. However, echinococcosis infection of humans by Ezo red foxes is considered a problem and there have been calls to act to reduce this, partially on the basis that the condition was introduced by human agency.

The familiarisation of Ezo red foxes with humans by feeding brings changes to its behaviour. For example, it has been confirmed that Ezo red foxes in Shiretoko National Park leave their home territories in April when the tourist season is over, seeking human food in Utoro city. Since the 1980s Ezo red foxes have permanently settled in green spaces in some urban areas, such as Sapporo.
