= Moriyama (disambiguation) =

Moriyama is a city in Shiga Prefecture, Japan.

Moriyama may also refer to:

== Places ==
- Moriyama-ku, Nagoya, a ward of Nagoya, Aichi Prefecture, Japan
- Moriyama, Nagasaki, a former town in Kitatakaki District, Nagasaki Prefecture, Japan
- Moriyama Domain, a former domain of Japan in Mutsu Province

== Other uses ==
- Moriyama (surname)
- Moriyama Station (disambiguation), multiple railway stations in Japan
- Moriyama-juku, a station of the Nakasendō in Moriyama, Shiga Prefecture, Japan
