= Rikuo =

Rikuo or Rikuō may refer to:

- Mutsu Province (1868), also called Rikuō Province (陸奥), an old province of Japan
- Rikuō Motorcycle (陸王), an old motorcycle manufacturing company in Japan
- Rikuo (Darkstalkers), a fictional character from the video game series Darkstalkers
- Rikuo Nemoto (1926 –1999), Japanese baseball catcher and manager
