= Nishitetsu Baseball Club =

- Logo

Information
- League: Japanese Baseball League
- Ballpark: Korakuen Stadium (Tokyo)
- Established: 1936; 1943 as Nishitetsu
- Folded: 1944
- Post-season championships: None
- Division championships: None
- Former name: Tokyo Senators (1936–1939); Tsubasa Baseball Club (1940); Taiyō Baseball Club (1941–1942)
- Colors: Black, red, white
- Ownership: Yoriyasu Arima (1936–1942); Nishitetsu (1943)
- Manager: Saburo Yokozawa (1936–1937); Shuichi Ishimoto (1942–1943)

The Nishitetsu Baseball Club was a team in the Japanese Baseball League (JBL). Founded in 1936 as the Tokyo Senators, the team went through a number of name changes and mergers before being dissolved after the 1943 season.

The team's undisputed star for most of its history was two-way player Jirō Noguchi, who excelled as a pitcher. Other notable players for the franchise included Chujiro Endo, Yutaka Ishii, Sadao Kondoh, Toshio Kurosawa, and Jirō's brother Akira Noguchi.

== Franchise history ==
=== Tokyo Senators (1936–1939) ===
The Senators were founded by a group that included politician Yoriyasu Arima. Saburo Yokozawa managed the team in 1936–1937. In the fall 1936 campaign, rookie pitcher Akira Noguchi went 15-13 with a 2.65 earned run average, following that with a combined 34–22 record in 1937, with a 2.21 ERA. (The 1936 and 1937 JBL seasons were split into spring and fall half-seasons.) Noguchi's 1937 totals led the league in games pitched and innings; he started nearly 70% of his team's games, and his 34 wins represented 68% of the Senators combined victories for the full season.

Akira Noguchi left the team after the 1937 season, but he was replaced in 1939 as the team's ace by his brother Jirō Noguchi. Jirō's rookie season was remarkable: a workhorse, he went 33–19 with a 2.04 earned run average, setting a rookie record for victories. He led the league in innings pitched, most games pitched, complete games (a remarkable 38), and hits and home runs allowed. He pitched in 72% of the team's games and had 67% of their total victories. When not pitching, he often played outfield or first base (although he only hit .251).

=== Tsubasa (1940) ===
For the 1940 season, the team was renamed the Tsubasa Baseball Club (Tsubasa meaning "wing"). (In October 1940, responding to rising hostility toward the West due to World War II, the league outlawed the use of English in Japanese baseball.) In 1940, Jirō Noguchi put together another remarkable season, going 30–11 with a league-leading 0.93 earned run average. He also hit .260. He had nearly 60% of the team's total number of victories for the season.

=== Taiyō (1941–1942) ===
Following the 1940 season, the team was wholly acquired by Yoriyasu Arima; the failing Nagoya Kinko was also merged with Tsubasa and for 1941 the new team was renamed the Taiyō Baseball Club. Jirō Noguchi went 25–12 with a league-leading 0.88 ERA in 1941, becoming the only pitcher in Japanese professional baseball history to have two consecutive sub-1 ERA seasons.

The franchise had its best season in 1942, finishing with 60 victories and a winning percentage of .606, good for second place in the league behind the Tokyo Kyojin. Jirō Noguchi won two-thirds of his team's victories, a league-leading 40 (he also lost 17 games), to go with a 1.19 ERA, and a still-league-record 19 shutoutsas well as 264 strikeouts. That year Noguchi pitched all 28 innings of a tie game against Nagoya Club that featured Nagoya's Michio Nishizawa also pitching the entire game. The team's manager in 1942–1943 was Shuichi Ishimoto.

=== Nishitetsu (1943) ===
Financial instability led to the team being acquired in 1943 by Nishi-Nippon Railroad, and it being renamed the Nishitetsu Baseball Club. Despite finishing with a .513 winning percentage that year (with Jirō Noguchi winning 25 games), the team was dissolved before the 1944 season.

== Legacy ==
In 1946, former team manager (and later Hall of Fame umpire) Saburo Yokozawa revived the Tokyo Senators team name. Although the team name was changed after one season, the franchise still exists as the Hokkaido Nippon-Ham Fighters.

Nishitetsu gained a new baseball team in 1950 as the Nishitetsu Clippers joined Nippon Professional Baseball; the franchise is now known as the Saitama Seibu Lions.

== Team season-by-season records ==
Year	Team name	Games	Wins	Losses	Ties	Winning Percentage	Finish	Games behind
1936 (fall)	Senators	28	12	16	0	.429	5/7	11
1937	Senators	104	30	26	0	.536	3/8	12
1937	Senators	104	20	27	1	.426	5/8	18.5
1938	Senators	75	13	21	1	.545	4/9	10
1938	Senators	75	19	20	1	.487	4/9	11
1939	Senators	96	49	38	9	.563	4/9	14.5
1940	Tsubasa	105	56	39	10	.589	4/8	15.5
1941	Taiyo	87	47	37	3	.560	3/8	15
1942	Taiyo	105	60	39	6	.606	2/8	12.5
1943	Nishitetsu	84	39	37	8	.513	5/8	12.5
Overall record		684	345	300	39	.533		

== See also ==
- Washington Senators
