= Katsuji Kawashima =

Japanese baseball player

- Infielder / Coach
- Born: April 17, 1943 (age 82); Sano, Tochigi, Japan
- Bats: Right Throws: Right

Member of the Japanese

Baseball Hall of Fame
- Induction: 2021
- Vote: 92.3%（13/14）
Medals
Men's baseball
Representing Japan
Asian Championship
Gold medal – first place	1993 Perth	Team competition
Intercontinental Cup
Silver medal – second place	1979 Cuba	Manager
Silver medal – second place	1995 Cuba	Manager
World Cup
Bronze medal – third place	1994 Nicaragua	Manager

Katsuji Kawashima (川島勝司, Kawashima Katsuji) is a right-handed, retired Japanese amateur, later formally professional baseball infielder and manager. Kawashima infielded for Nippon Gakki as a player for 24 years from 1966 to 1990, also going on and off as the manager of the team. He served as the manager of the Japanese national baseball team at the 1988 and 1996 Summer Olympics, leading the team to a silver medal on both occasions.

Kawashima is a 2021 Japanese Baseball Hall of Fame inductee.

== Career ==
=== Junior years ===
Kawashima was born on April 17, 1943, in Sano, Tochigi Prefecture. As a junior, he played for the Kiryu High School team, where under the guidance of Toichiro Inagawa, he won the prefectural qualifying round for the Japanese High School Baseball Championship in the summer of 1961 and advanced to the semi-finals of the North Kanto Tournament, but fell short to the Sakushin Gakuin University team who also featured Soroku Yagisawa and Ikuo Shimano, missing out on the Koshien tournament.

=== Senior career ===
==== As a player ====
After graduating high school, Kawashima went to Chuo University and played for its team. He won the Tohto University Baseball League League twice while he was there. He played in 101 games in the league, scoring 78 hits in 316 at-bats with a batting average of .247, 0 home runs, and 31 RBIs. He was named the best nine's third baseman twice. He was classmates with fellow players Shiro Takegami, Toshimitsu Suetsugu, Yoshimasa Takahashi, Michihiro Takabatake and Shigeru Hino.

In 1966, he joined Nippon Gakki (now Yamaha) baseball club. He competed in the 1967 Intercity baseball tournament. He hit two home runs and advanced to the finals, but was defeated by the Nippon Oil's Hiramatsu Masatsugu team and finished as a runner-up. The following year, in 1968, he competed in the Intercity Baseball Tournament again, this time as a reinforcement player for Kawai Musical Instruments team. He advanced to the finals as a key hitter, but fell short to the Fuji Steel Hirohata team and finished as runner-up again. In August same year, he participated in a Japan-US friendly baseball game against the Alaska Goldpanners of Fairbanks. He was selected as a third baseman for the amateur league that year, and was drafted second overall by the Osaka Kintetsu Buffaloes, but turned them down.

==== As a player and manager ====
He became manager of the team in the off-season of 1971 (he acted both as a player and manager). In 1972 the team made its fourth appearance in the Intercity baseball tournament and two years in a row. Thanks to the excellent pitching of ace pitcher Satoshi Niimi, the team defeated Mitsubishi Motors Kawasaki's team in the finals, leading the team to their first victory in his first year as manager. The same year, he participated in the 1994 Baseball World Cup held in Nicaragua as the manager of the Japanese national team. Although an amateur, Kawashima was the first Japanese national team manager to participate in a full-scale world tournament. After four seasons with Nippon Gakki, he left his position as manager to focus on his own work, but made a return as a manager in 1978 and coached the team until 1980. During this time, he again competed as the manager of the Japanese national team in the IBAF Intercontinental Cup held in Cuba in 1979. The team lost to the host Cuba in the finals, finishing as runners-up.

In 1986, he put on the Nippon Gakki uniform for the third time, winning the Intercity Baseball Tournament in 1987 and 1990. 1987 was also the year the team name changed from "Nippon Gakki" to "Yamaha". Yamaha has won the Intercity baseball tournament three times and Kawashima was in charge on all occasions. He is also the only manager to have won the championship in three different decades, the 1970s, 1980s, and 1990s. In 1987, he received a special award from the Best Nine in the Amateur League.

His experience led him to serve as a coach for the Japanese national baseball team, a position he had been involved in for some time. He served as head coach of the Japanese national baseball team at the 1988 Seoul Olympics, and as manager of the Japanese national baseball team at the 1993 Asian Baseball Championship, the 1995 18th Asian Baseball Championship and the Atlanta Olympics Asian Regional Qualifiers, and the 1996 Atlanta Olympics.

In the off-season of 1999, he was asked to become manager by Toyota Motor Corporation, a rival team in the same Tokai region, and accepted the offer. In the amateur baseball world, where it is rare to bring in managers from outside the team, where "home-grown players" are more important than in the professional leagues, the transfer and appointment of a big name as manager was big news. He managed Toyota for three years between 1999 and 2002, participating in the Intercity Baseball Tournament every year, but unable to win the championship. Since the 2003 season, he has been watching the team away from the bench as Toyota's deputy general manager and general manager.

He has served as a permanent director of the Japan Baseball Association and is currently serving as an advisor to the association since 2021.

He also frequently serves as a television commentator for the Koshien High School Baseball Tournament .

On January 14, 2021, he was selected as a Baseball Hall of Fame Inductee (Special Award Category)., and the award ceremony was held on July 14, before the start of the 46th Japan Amateur Baseball Championship Final ( Osaka Gas vs. Mitsubishi Heavy Industries East at Kyocera Dome Osaka ).
