= 1934 Japan Tour =

Barnstorming baseball tour

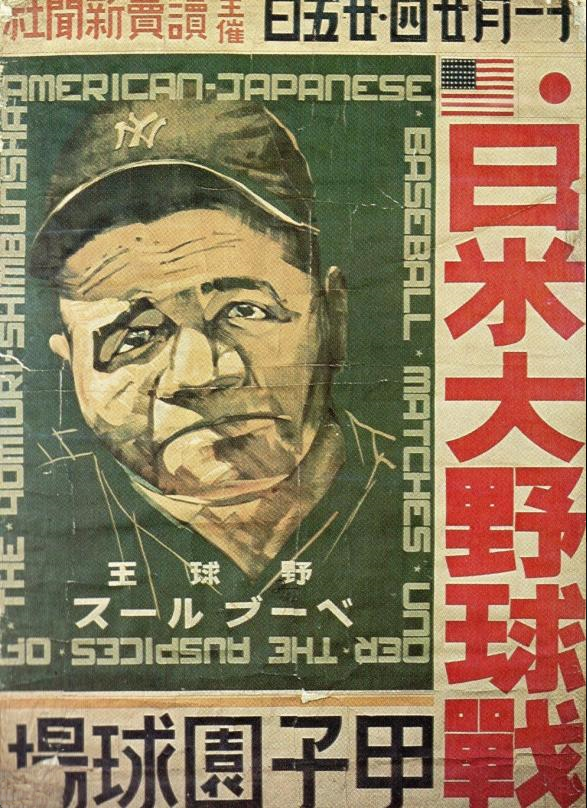
Poster for the tour, showing Babe Ruth.

The 1934 Japan Tour was a 12-city barnstorming baseball tour of Japan that took place in November and December 1934. It featured an all-star team of American League baseball players, playing against a Japanese team that would become the Yomiuri Giants. The baseball stars were both tourists and ambassadors of good will.

This was not the first baseball tour of the country (there were tours in 1908, 1913, 1920, 1922 and 1931), but the Americans in those tours had played Japanese amateur or college ballclubs.

== Details ==
The tour included Earl Averill, Lou Gehrig, Charlie Gehringer, Lefty Gomez, Connie Mack, Jimmie Foxx, Babe Ruth, Moe Berg and other American League players, as the National League would not allow their players to participate. Ruth, “still the most popular and famous athlete of his day” was the face of American baseball at the time.

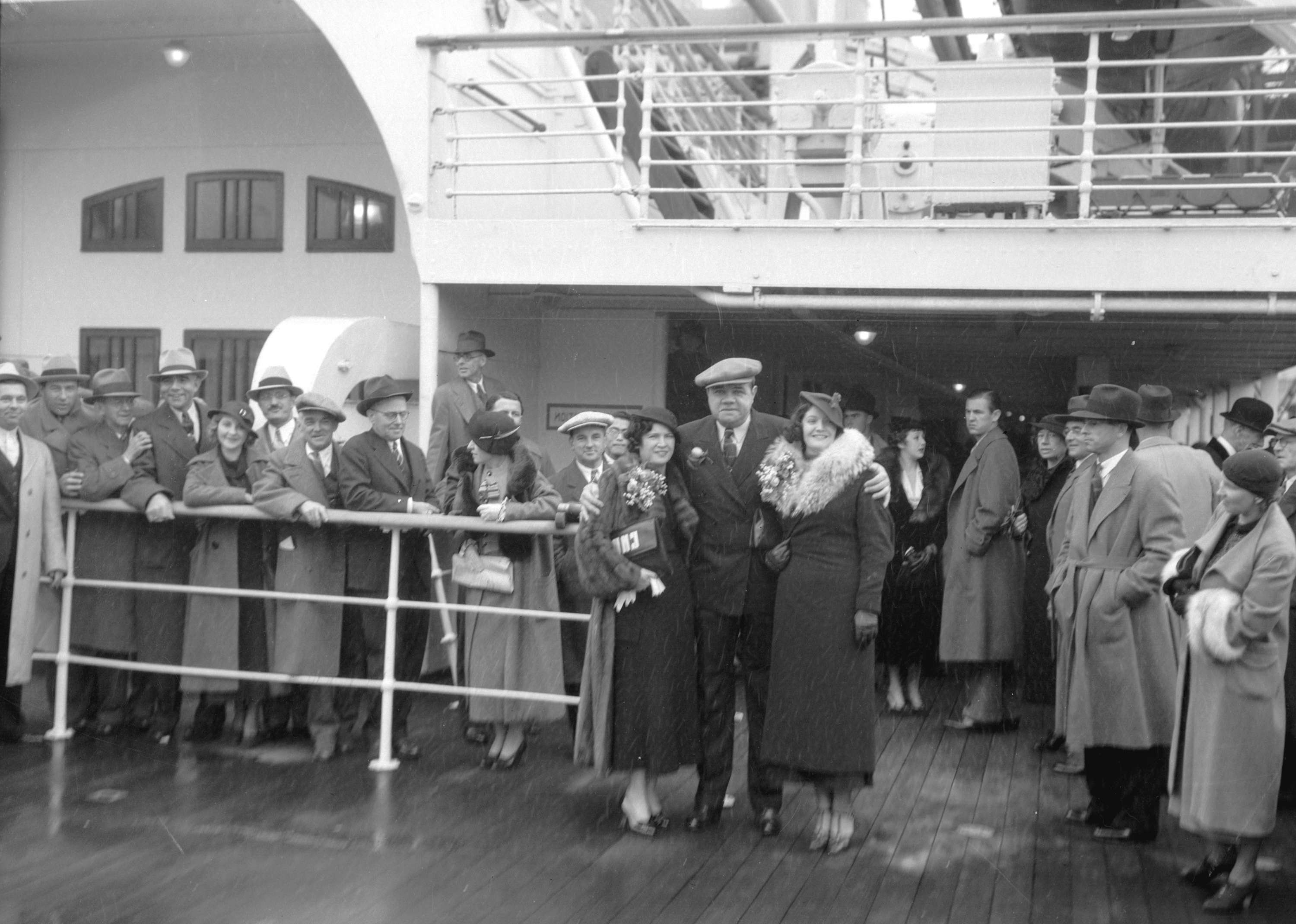
Ruth in Vancouver aboard the "Empress of Japan", October 1934, before steaming to Japan.

More than half a million Japanese filled the streets of Tokyo to welcome Ruth and 14 other all-star baseball players for the barnstorming tour. The Americans played 18 games against the All-Nippon team, featuring many of Japan’s top players, in front of tens of thousands of fans. The games were played in Meiji-Jingu Stadium in Tokyo, Koshien Stadium in Kobe, Yagiyama Baseball Field in Sendai and others throughout the country. The Americans won all eighteen games. Ruth would hit 13 home runs during the tour.

Staying in the Imperial Hotel in Tokyo, there was a knock on the door of Babe Ruth’s hotel room one night. Babe opened the door to find a gentleman wearing a kimono, asking for Ruth’s autograph on a baseball. Ruth happily obliged; the man then proceeded to pull out another dozen or so balls from his kimono for Ruth to sign. Ruth’s wife and daughter witnessed the event. His daughter also recalled how popular Ruth was during the tour: fans would rise to their feet every time he came to bat and waved Japanese and American flags.

After the Japanese games, the team played games in Shanghai and Manila. Most players then went home while Ruth and his family continued westward for four months.

The Japanese portion of the tour was filmed by Jimmie Foxx and his wife using eight millimeter black-and-white film. A copy of the film has been digitized by the National Baseball Hall of Fame and Museum. Moe Berg also brought a 16-mm Bell and Howell movie camera and made short films of important Japanese installations; this was thought to be one of Berg’s first missions as a spy. Many of the players were shadowed while on the street in Tokyo while their luggage was being searched back at their hotel.

== Legacy ==
The tour was quite popular. The team of Japanese all-stars were kept together after the 1934 barnstorming tour and formed Japan’s first professional baseball team in December 1934, called Great Tokyo baseball club. The All-Star Japanese team was led by Matsutaro Shoriki and was encouraged to continue with baseball in Japan. This team traveled to the United States in 1935, playing against amateur, college, and minor league teams. The team was later called Yomiuri Tokyo Giants. The 1934 tour was “a big factor in making professional baseball possible in Japan” and helped cement the Babe’s popularity in Japan.

The tour was covered in a book published in 2012. Items from the tour, including posters, baseballs, jerseys and caps are held both in the Japanese Baseball Hall of Fame and in Cooperstown.

A cap Ruth wore during the tour sold for over $300,000 in 2014.
