= Chūjirō =

- Gender: Male

Origin
- Origin: Japanese
- Meaning: Different meanings depending on the kanji used

Chūjirō, Chujiro or Chuujirou (written: 忠二郎 or 忠次郎) is a masculine Japanese given name. Notable people with the name include:

- Chujiro Endo (遠藤 忠二郎; 1917–?), Japanese baseball player
- Chujiro Hayashi (林 忠次郎; 1880–1940), Japanese naval surgeon and Reiki practitioner
