= Saburo Yokozawa =

Japanese baseball umpire (1904–1995)

- Born: 16 December 1904; Japanese Taiwan
- Died: 28 November 1995 (aged 90)
- Education: Meiji University
- Occupations: Japanese Baseball League manager Nippon Professional Baseball umpire
- Years active: 1929–1959
- Baseball career

Member of the Japanese

Baseball Hall of Fame
- Induction: 1988

Saburo Yokozawa (横沢 三郎, Yokozawa Saburō) (1904–1995) is a Japanese former professional baseball manager and umpire. He was involved in various iterations of Japanese professional baseball from 1929 through 1959.

== Early life ==
Born in Taiwan under Japanese rule, Yokozawa graduated from Meiji University.

== Baseball career ==
=== Pre WW2 ===
He umpired for Japan's nascent professional league in the years 1929-1935; he also helped the Tokyo-based team to four victories in Japan's Intercity baseball tournament.

At the beginning of the Japanese Baseball League (JBL), Yokozawa managed the Tokyo Senators in 1936–1937. Yokozawa played second base for the team in one game in 1937, and had one plate appearance.

Leaving managing, Yokozawa became an umpire in the JBL in 1938, working in that capacity through the 1944 season. Meanwhile, his old team the Senators, after a number of ownership and name changes, disbanded following the 1943 season.

=== Post WW2 ===
In 1946, Yokozawa looked to revive the franchise and soon founded the new Senators. He assembled a team of ready and able players, but as a newly formed team the Senators faced strict fiscal management and resorted to using hand-me-down uniforms from the Hankyu Railway's pre-war team, the Hankyu Club (who would eventually become the modern-day Orix Buffaloes). Former Japanese statesman Kinkazu Saionji, grandson of the influential Kinmochi Saionji, became the team's owner, and Noboru Oride, borrowing heavily from a Ginza cabaret proprietor, became the team's sponsor. Trapped by a lack of funds, Yokozawa was forced to resign as the team's manager after one season.

Returning again to umpiring, Yokozawa remained in that position until 1959. When the JBL reorganized into Nippon Professional Baseball in 1950, Yokozawa was named umpire-in-chief of the Pacific League division.

== Honors ==
Yokozawa was elected by the Special Committee to the Japanese Baseball Hall of Fame in 1988.
