= Shigeru Makino =

Japanese baseball player and coach (1928–1984)

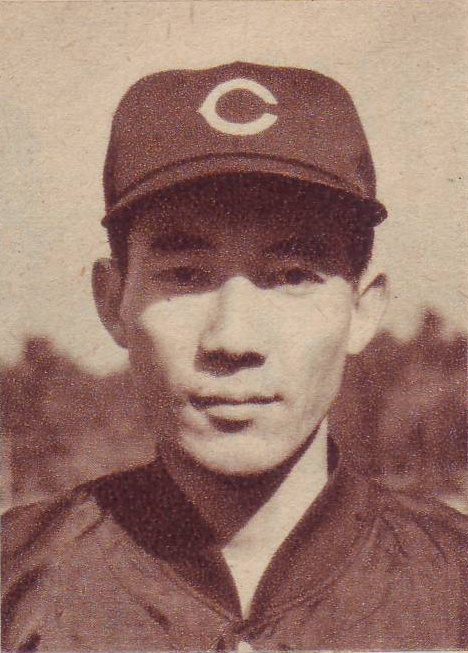
- Shigeru Makino in 1955
- Shortstop/Second baseman
- Born: 26 July 1928; Takamatsu, Kagawa, Japan
- Died: 2 December 1984 (aged 56)
- Batted: Right Threw: Right

debut
- 1952, for the Nagoya Dragons

Last appearance
- 1959, for the Chunichi Dragons

Teams
- As player: Nagoya/Chunichi Dragons (1952–1959); As coach: Yomiuri Giants (1961–1974, 1981–1983)

Member of the Japanese

Baseball Hall of Fame
- Induction: 1991

Shigeru Makino (牧野 茂, Makino Shigeru; 26 July 1928 – 2 December 1984) was a Japanese baseball shortstop, second baseman and coach. Makino played with the Nagoya/Chunichi Dragons from 1952 to 1959. He later coached the Yomiuri Giants from 1961 to 1974, and again from 1981 to 1983.

On 2 December 1984 Makino died due to bladder cancer, which was diagnosed in 1981.

He was elected to the Japanese Baseball Hall of Fame in 1991.
