= Junzo Sekine =

Japanese baseball player (1927–2020)

Junzo Sekine 関根 潤三
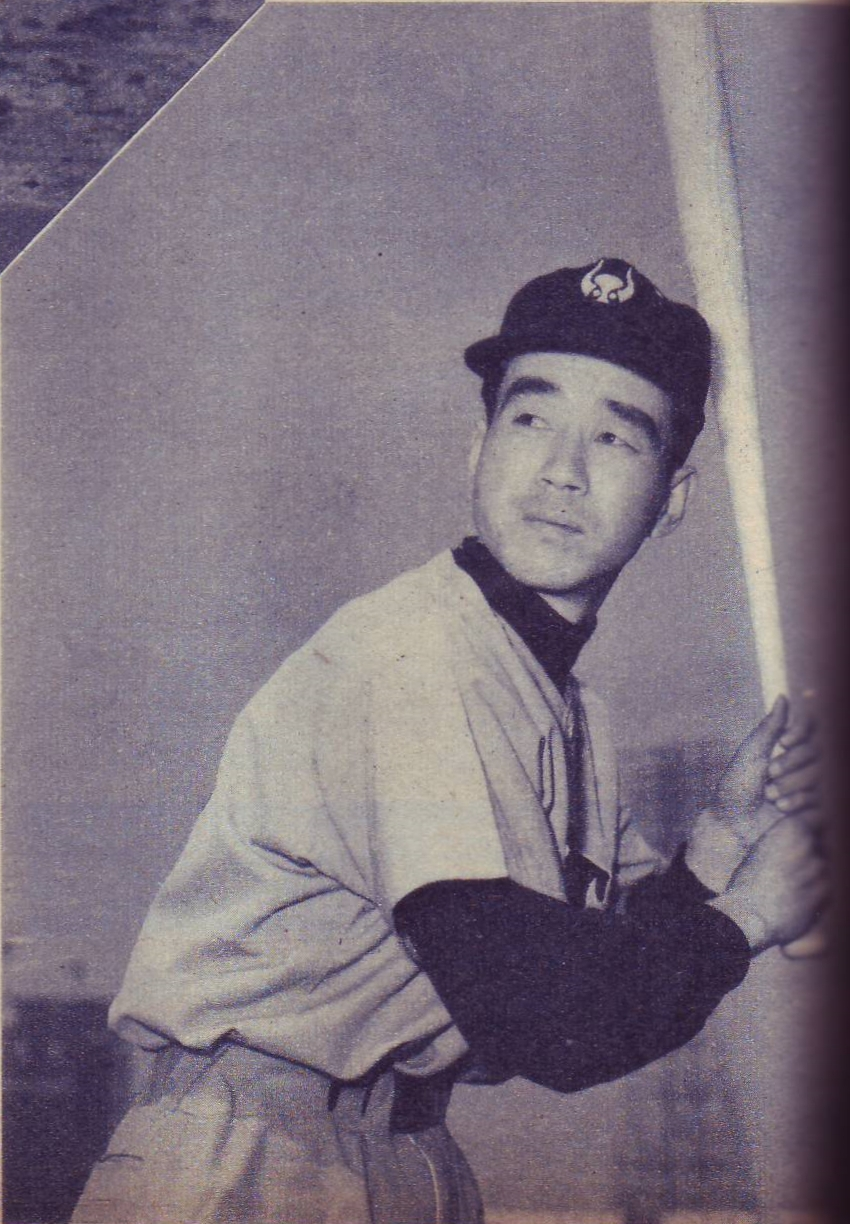
- Sekine in 1959
- Pitcher / Outfielder / Manager
- Born: March 15, 1927; Tokyo, Japan
- Died: April 9, 2020 (aged 93); Tokyo, Japan
- Batted: Left Threw: Left

NPB debut
- March 15, 1950, for the Kintetsu Pearls

Last appearance
- November 55, 1965, for the Yomiuri Giants

NPB statistics (through 1965)
- Win–loss record: 65-94
- Earned run average: 3.43
- Strikeouts: 645
- Batting average: .279
- Home runs: 59
- Runs batted in: 424
- Stats at Baseball Reference

Teams
- As player: Kintetsu Pearls/Kintetsu Buffalo/Kintetsu Buffaloes (1950 – 1964); Yomiuri Giants (1965); As coach: Hiroshima Toyo Carp (1970); Yomiuri Giants (1975 – 1976); As manager: Yokohama Taiyo Whales (1982 – 1984); Yakult Swallows (1987 – 1989)

Career highlights and awards
- 5× NPB All-Star (1953, 1959, 1960, 1962, 1963)

Member of the Japanese

Baseball Hall of Fame
- Induction: 2003

Junzo Sekine (関根 潤三, Sekine Junzō; March 15, 1927 – April 9, 2020) was a Japanese professional baseball player who played as two ways as a pitcher and outfielder. He spent the majority of this career with the Kintetsu Pearls/Kintetsu Buffalo/Kintetsu Buffaloes.

As a rookie in 1950, Sekine attracted attention by batting 3rd, 4th, or 5th in the Kintetsu Pearls' lineup while pitching in the game. Sekine focused on pitching from 1950 to 1957, but spent the latter half of his career (1958 to 1965) as a position player. His best year as a pitcher was 1954, when he went 16–12 with a 2.44 earned run average and 118 strikeouts. His best years as a hitter were in 1962–1963, when he hit and .301 and .296 respectively, with a total of 21 home runs and 115 RBI.

Sekine was elected to the Japanese Baseball Hall of Fame in 2003.

Sekine died on April 9, 2020, in Tokyo, at the age of 93.
