= Masahiro Yamamoto (baseball) =

Japanese baseball player

Masa Yamamoto
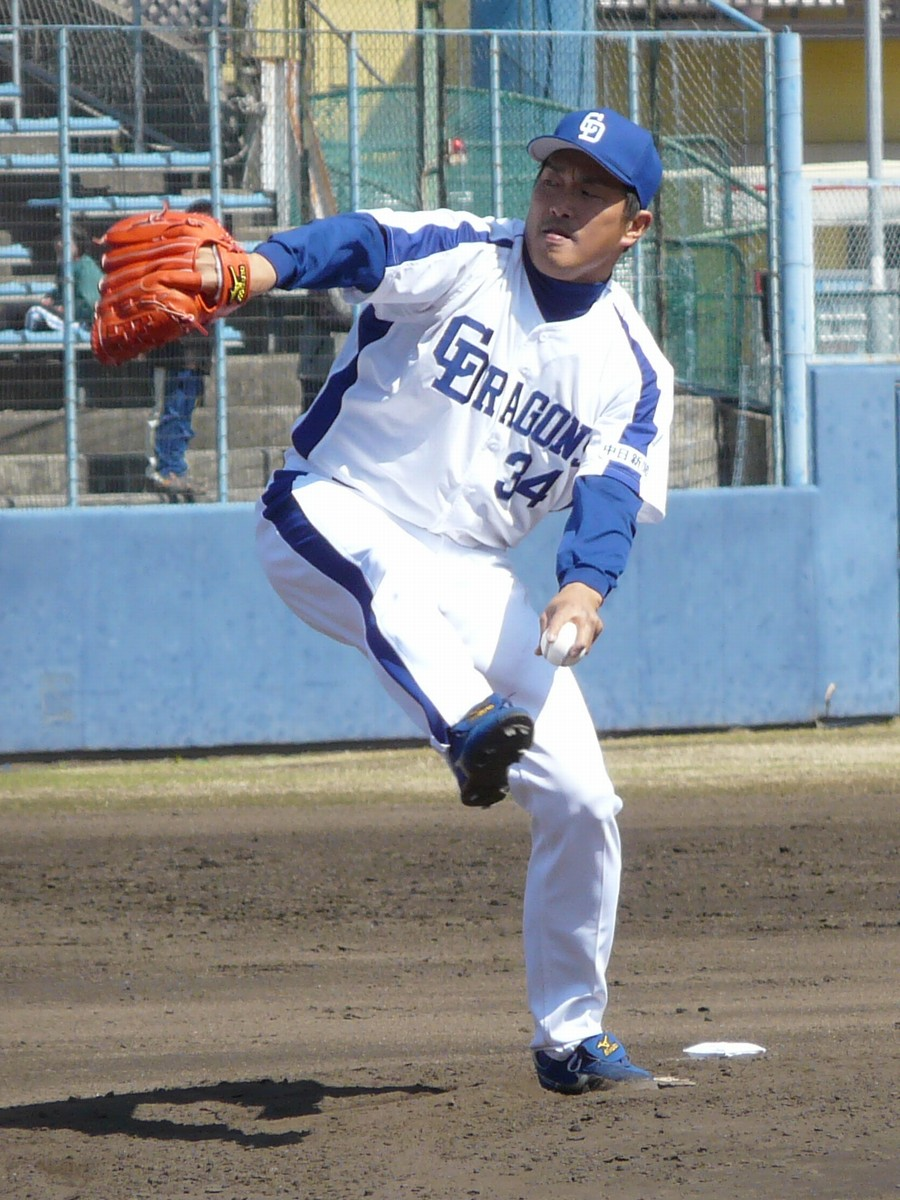
- Pitcher
- Born: August 11, 1965 (age 61); Chigasaki, Kanagawa, Japan
- Batted: Left Threw: Left

NPB debut
- October 16, 1986, for the Chunichi Dragons

Last NPB appearance
- October 7, 2015, for the Chunichi Dragons

NPB statistics
- Win–loss record: 219–165
- Earned run average: 3.45
- Strikeouts: 2,310
- Stats at Baseball Reference

Teams
- Chunichi Dragons (1986–2015)

Career highlights and awards
- Central League ERA Champion (1993); Eiji Sawamura Award (1994); No-hitter (2006)

Member of the Japanese

Baseball Hall of Fame
- Induction: 2022
- Vote: 85.0%（307/361）

Masahiro 'Masa' Yamamoto (山本昌 (Yamamoto Masa), real name: 山本昌広 (Yamamoto Masahiro), born August 11, 1965) is a left-handed, retired Japanese professional baseball pitcher. A screwballer, Yamamoto pitched for the Chunichi Dragons in Japan's Nippon Professional Baseball for 29 years from 1986 to 2015. He is the oldest Japanese pitcher to win a baseball game. With 200+ career victories, he is a member of Meikyukai.

== Biography ==
Yamamoto attended Nichidai Fujisawa High School, and was selected at age 18 by Chunichi.

Yamamoto was the Central League Earned Run Average Champion in 1993, posting a 2.05 ERA. He won the 1994 Eiji Sawamura Award, going 19–8 with 3.49 ERA and 14 complete games.

On September 16, 2006, Yamamoto threw a no-hitter against the Hanshin Tigers, becoming the oldest pitcher in NPB to throw a no-hit game.

On September 5, 2014, Yamamoto won his first and only start of the season at Nagoya Dome in a shutout match against the Hanshin Tigers, making him the oldest Japanese pitcher to win a game, at 49 years, 25 days, surpassing the old mark of 48 years, 4 months set by the Hankyu Braves’ Shinji Hamazaki in 1950. During the game, he threw 90 pitches in five scoreless innings, gave up five hits and a walk, and striking out two.

Yamamoto has pitched in six Japan Series with the Dragons, with his team winning once (in 2007).

== Other activities ==
Yamamoto is a well known RC model aficionado, and came in 4th place in a RC tournament in 2002. He has also hosted an RC model TV show on Fuji TV ONE titled Yamamoto Masa no Rajiko Dojo.

In addition, Yamamoto also has owned shares of racehorses, with his most successful horses being Al Ain and Shahryar.

== See also ==
- List of top Nippon Professional Baseball strikeout pitchers
