= Sadao Kondoh =

Japanese baseball player, coach, and manager

Sadao Kondoh 近藤 貞雄
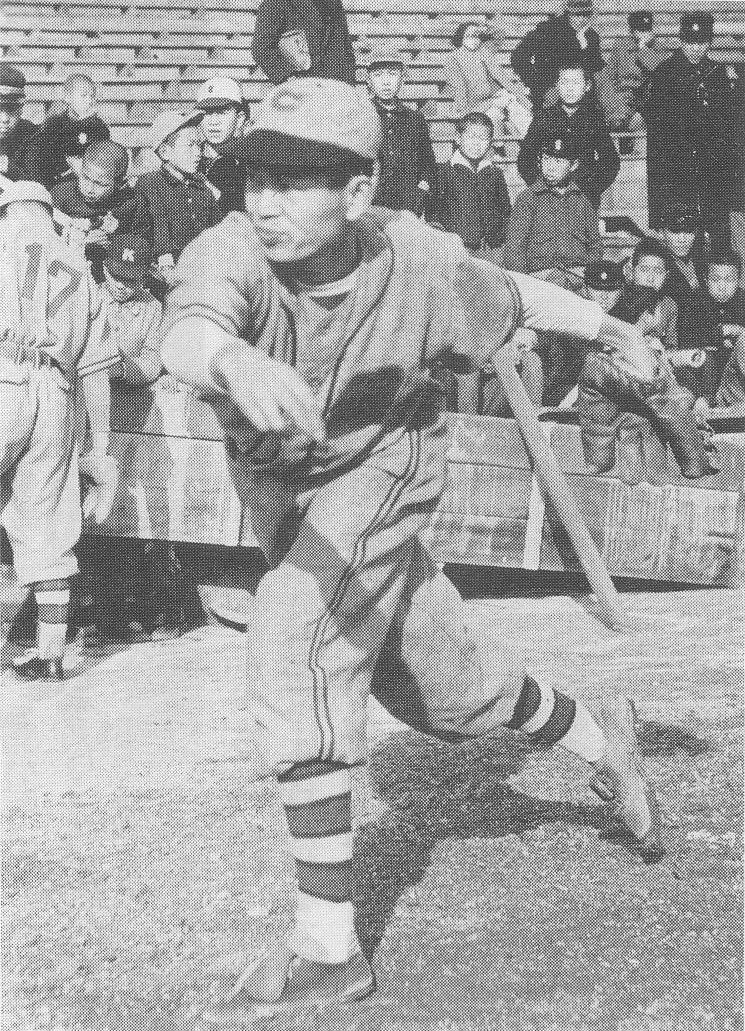
- Pitcher, coach, manager
- Born: October 2, 1925; Okazaki, Aichi, Japan
- Died: January 2, 2006 (aged 80); Japan
- Batted: Right Threw: Right

NPB debut
- 1943, for the Nishitetsu Baseball Club

Last appearance
- 1954, for the Chunichi Dragons

NPB statistics
- Win–loss record: 55–71
- Earned run average: 2.91
- Strikeouts: 274

Teams
- As player: Nishitetsu Baseball Club (1943); Tokyo Giants/Yomiuri Giants (1944–1947); Chunichi Dragons/Nagoya Dragons (1948–1954); As manager: Chunichi Dragons (1981–1983); Yokohama Taiyo Whales (1985–1986); Nippon-Ham Fighters (1993–1994); As coach: Chunichi Dragons (1955–1962, 1972–1976); Lotte Orions (1989–1991)

Member of the Japanese

Baseball Hall of Fame
- Induction: 1999
- Election method: Selection Committee for the Players

Sadao Kondoh (近藤 貞雄, Kondoh Sadao; October 2, 1925 – January 2, 2006) was a former professional baseball pitcher and manager in Japan's Nippon Professional Baseball. He was elected to the Japanese Baseball Hall of Fame in 1999.

== Biography ==
Sadao Kondo was born on 2 October 1925 in Aichi Japan. After graduating from Aichi Prefectural Okazaki Junior High School and dropping out of Hosei University, he joined the Nishitetsu Baseball Club in 1943 as a pitcher only for the team to disband one year later due to World War II. He then joined the Yomiuri Giants after being offered a contract by general manager Hideo Fujimoto. However, during a walk in Matsuyama, Ehime Prefecture, where he was staying for the autumn training camp that year, he was nearly hit by a jeep, but when he tried to avoid it, he fell into a gutter. A shard of glass that had fallen there injured the middle finger of his right hand. he was unable to receive prompt treatment, and the deep nerve damage limited his Pitching, Kondo's middle finger on his right hand was bent from the second joint onwards, and never returned to its original position. He served as the Chunichi pitching coach from 1955 to 1962 and from 1964 to 1968. He Retired from Coaching in 1976 and became a commentator. Kondo was appointed manager of the Chunichi Dragons in 1981 after Toshio Naka had been fired for finishing last in the league. They won the League Championship in 1982. He Resigned in 1983 after the team finished in last. From 1985-1986 He Was the manager of the Yokohama Taiyo Whales and from 1993-1994 he was the manager of the Nippon-Ham Fighters. He then served as a Sports commentator from his retirement in 1994 until his death in 2006.

== Death ==
Kondo died of respiratory failure at a hospital in Tokyo at 9:22 a.m. on January 2, 2006.
