= Jiro Noguchi =

Japanese baseball player (1920–2007)

Jirō Noguchi
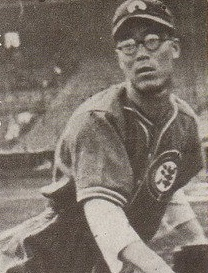
- Pitcher, Outfielder, Infielder
- Born: January 6, 1920; Nagoya, Aichi, Japan
- Died: May 21, 2007 (aged 87); Takarazuka, Hyōgo, Japan
- Batted: Right Threw: Right

JBL debut
- 1939, for the Tokyo Senators

Last NPB appearance
- 1953, for the Hankyu Braves

JBL/NPB career pitching statistics
- Win–loss: 237–139
- Earned run average: 1.96
- Shutouts: 65
- Innings pitched: 3,447.1
- Strikeouts: 1,395

JBL/NPB career hitting statistics
- Batting average: .248
- Hits: 830
- Home runs: 9
- Run batted in: 368

Teams
- As player: Tokyo Senators/Tsubasa/Taiyō/Nishitetsu (1939–1943); Hankyu Club/Hankyu Braves (1946–1953)

Career highlights and awards
- 2x JBL E.R.A. champion (1940, 1941); 6x 20-game winner (1939, 1940, 1941, 1942, 1943, 1947); 3x 30-game winner (1939, 1940, 1942); 40-game winner (1942); 31-game hitting streak (1946)

Member of the Japanese

Baseball Hall of Fame
- Induction: 1989

Jirō Noguchi (野口二郎, Noguchi Jirō) (January 6, 1920 – May 21, 2007) was a Japanese baseball pitcher and outfielder/infielder who played 13 seasons in the Japanese Baseball League and then Nippon Professional Baseball, from 1939 to 1952. A two-way player who really excelled at pitching, Noguchi was a six-time 20-game winner, a three-time 30-game winner, and once won 40 games in a season. His 1.96 career earned run average is second all-time. As a batter, Noguchi had a 31-game hitting streak, a Japanese professional baseball record which stood for 25 years. He was elected to the Japanese Baseball Hall of Fame in 1989.

Noguchi was one of four brothers who played professional baseball in Japan.

== Biography ==
Born in Nagoya, Aichi, Noguchi attended Chukyo Shogyo High School and Hosei University (although he dropped out).

=== Senators/Tsubasba/Taiyō/Nishitetsu ===
Noguchi began his professional career in 1939 with the Japanese Baseball League (JBL), as a 19-year-old with the Tokyo Senators (the team his older brother Akira Noguchi had played for in 1936–1937). Jirō Noguchi played five seasons with the franchise, which, due to various pressures and changing ownership went through a number of name changes during his tenure: Tokyo Senators (1939), Tsubasa Baseball Club (1940), Taiyō (1941–1942), and Nishitetsu (1943).

Noguchi's rookie season of 1939 was remarkable: a workhorse, he went 33–19 with a 2.04 earned run average, setting a rookie record for victories. He led the league in innings pitched, most games pitched, complete games, and hits and home runs allowed. When not pitching, he often played outfield or first base (although he only hit. 251).

In 1940, Noguchi put together another remarkable season, going 30–11 with a league-leading 0.93 earned run average. He also hit .260. Noguchi went 25–12 with a league-leading 0.88 ERA in 1941, becoming the only pitcher in Japanese professional baseball history to have two consecutive sub-1 ERA seasons.

Jirō Noguchi's 1942 season was his most impressive one as a pitcher, featuring a record of 40-17 and a 1.19 ERA, with a still-league-record 19 shutouts to go along with 264 strikeouts. He led the league in victories. That year Noguchi pitched all 28 innings of a tie game against Nagoya Club that featured Nagoya's Michio Nishizawa also pitching all 28 innings. In 1942, Noguchi appeared in 66 games, throwing a total of 527 1/3 innings.

In 1943, Akira Noguchi returned to pro baseball (this time as an infielder/catcher), joining Jirō on the team. (Two other Noguchi brothers briefly played in the JBL: Noboru [b. 1922, d. 1945] with the Hanshin Baseball Club, and Wataru [b. 1926], who played for Kinki Nihon.) Noguchi went 25–12 with a 1.45 ERA in 1943, also hitting .253. Despite finishing with a .513 winning percentage in 1943, Nishitetsu was dissolved after the season. By this time, Noguchi had been drafted by the military to serve in World War II.

=== Hankyu ===
When the league returned after the war in 1946, Jirō and Akira joined the Hankyu Club, which a year later became the Hankyu Braves. (Altogether, Jirō and Akira played five years as teammates in the JBL.) In 1946, Jirō Noguchi had a 31-game hitting streak, a record which stood until 1971 (when it was broken by Tokuji Nagaike). Noguchi hit .298 overall, finishing ninth in the league in batting average. He was 13-14 for Hankyu with a 2.67 ERA, good for fifth in the league.

In 1947, Noguchi had his sixth 20-win season at 24–17 with a 2.26 ERA. In 1948, Noguchi was 14–16 with a 2.94 ERA and hit .261; he also stole 18 bases in 22 attempts. That year he set a record with 13 complete games that featured no bases on balls.

In 1950, the JBL reorganized into Nippon Professional Baseball (NPB); Noguchi stayed with Hankyu, playing into the 1953 season. His final notable year as a pitcher was 1950 when he went 15–9, finishing sixth in the Pacific League division in ERA with a 3.16 mark; he also hit .259.

=== Retirement and legacy ===
Noguchi retired after the 1953 season, later working as a minor league manager for the Kintetsu Buffaloes, and as a coach for the Hankyu Braves and Mainichi Orions.

For his career, Noguchi went 237–139 with a career 1.96 ERA, walking 647 and striking out 1,395 in 3,447 1/3 innings. He hit .248 with 9 career home runs and 368 runs batted in. He is second all-time in Japanese baseball in career ERA (behind Hideo Fujimoto) and still ranks very high in a number of career pitching records, including victories, complete games, shutouts, walkless complete games, and innings pitched. Baseball guru Jim Albright ranks Noguchi as number 12 on his list of the greatest players in Japanese baseball history.

Noguchi was elected by the Selection Committee for Players to the Japanese Baseball Hall of Fame in 1989. He died in Takarazuka, Hyōgo, on May 21, 2007, at age 87.
