= Horace Wilson (professor) =

American expatriate educator in Empire of Japan

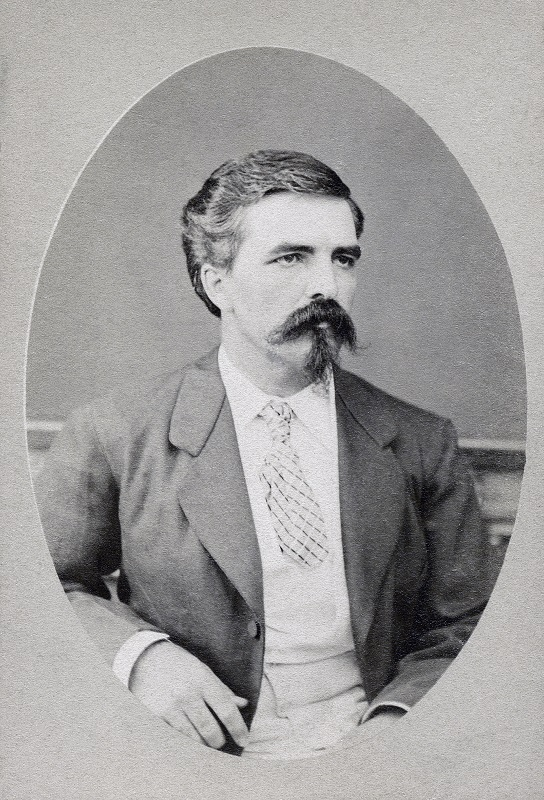
- Wilson in 1874
- Born: February 10, 1843; Gorham, Maine, U.S.
- Died: March 4, 1927 (aged 84); San Francisco, California, U.S.

Member of the Japanese

Baseball Hall of Fame
- Induction: 2003

Horace Wilson (February 10, 1843 – March 4, 1927) was an American expatriate educator in late 19th-century Empire of Japan. He is one of the persons credited with introducing the sport of baseball to Japan.

== Biography ==
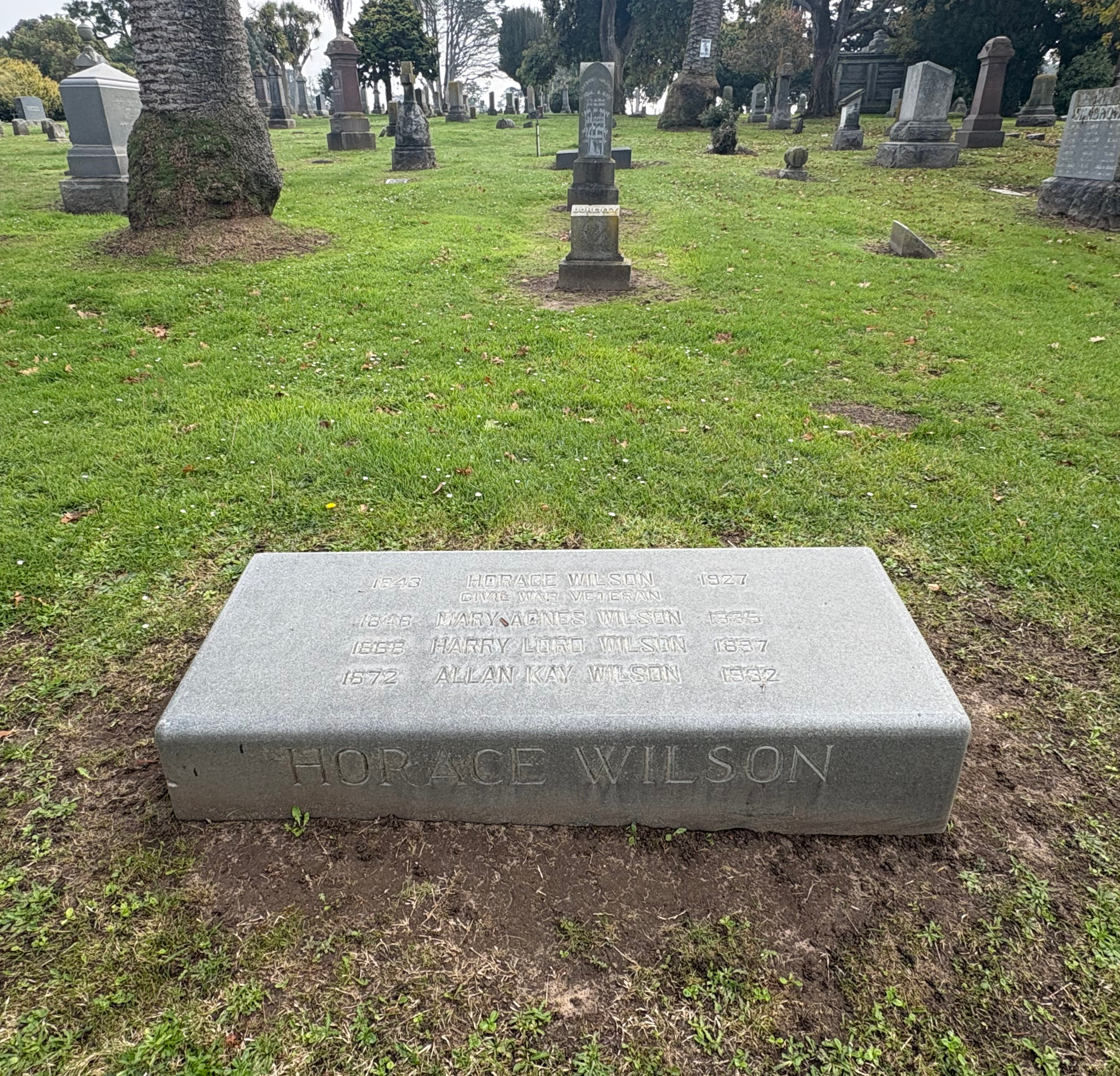
Wilson's grave at Cypress Lawn Memorial Park

Wilson was born in Gorham, Maine, United States. He enrolled at Kents Hill School in the fall of 1858, and is believed to have graduated in the spring of 1862. A veteran of the U.S. Civil War, he fought for the 12th Maine Volunteer Infantry Regiment against the Confederates in Louisiana.

After the war, he was hired by the Japanese government as a foreign adviser to assist in the modernization of the Japanese education system after the Meiji Restoration. He served as a professor of English at Kaisei Gakko, the forerunner of Tokyo Imperial University.

In either 1872 or 1873, Wilson decided that his students needed more physical exercise, and introduced them to the sport of baseball. Several weeks or months later, enough interest had developed for the school to sponsor a seven-inning game between the Japanese students and foreign instructors. The first formal baseball team was established in 1878.

Wilson returned to the United States in 1877 and lived in San Francisco, serving on the Board of Supervisors. He died in San Francisco in 1927 at the age of 84, and was buried at Cypress Lawn Memorial Park in Colma. Wilson was posthumously elected to membership in the Japanese Baseball Hall of Fame by the special committee in 2003.

== See also ==
- Japanese baseball
