= Takeo Akuta =

Japanese baseball player and manager (1903–1987)

Akuta Takeo 芥田 武夫
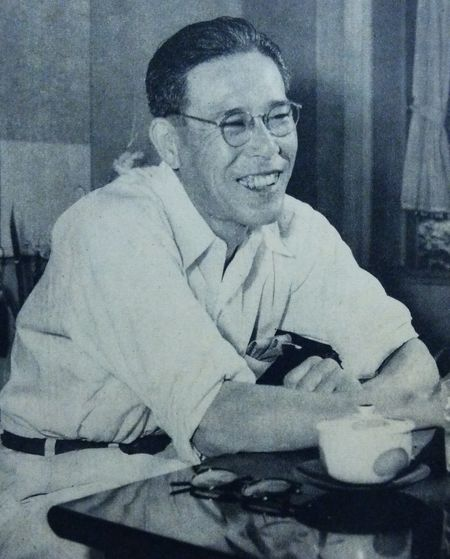
- Akuta in 1956
- Born: October 20, 1903; Himeji, Japan
- Died: September 5, 1987 (aged 83)

Managerial statistics (through 1957)
- Wins: 265
- Losses: 331
- Ties: 14

Teams
- As manager: Kintetsu Pearls (1952-1957)

Member of the Japanese

Baseball Hall of Fame
- Induction: 1988
- Election method: Special Committee

Takeo Akuta (芥田 武夫, Akuta Takeo; October 20, 1903 – September 5, 1987) was a Japanese baseball player and manager who was a member of the Japanese Baseball League. Akuta was born October 20, 1903 in Himeji, Japan. On September 24, 1952 Akuta took over as the manager of the Kintetsu Pearls, of the Japan Pacific League. In 1988 he was posthumously elected to the Japanese Baseball Hall of Fame.
