= Yutaka Ishii =

Japanese baseball player (died 1920)

- First baseman
- Born: 27 February 1920; Aichi Prefecture, Japanese Empire
- Died: between 1942 and 1945; Unknown
- Batted: Right Threw: Right

JBL debut
- 1940, for the Tsubasa Baseball Club

Last JBL appearance
- 1942, for the Taiyō Baseball Club

JBL statistics (through 1940–1942)
- Batting average: .183
- Home runs: 3
- RBI: 34

Teams
- Tsubasa Baseball Club (1940); Taiyō Baseball Club (1941–1942)

Yutaka Ishii (Japanese: 石井 豊; 27 February 1920 – between 1942 and 1945) was a Japanese baseball player who appeared as a first baseman in the Japanese Baseball League. Entering military service in 1942, he was killed in action during the Second World War.
