= Seiichi Shima =

Japanese baseball player and soldier (1920–1945)

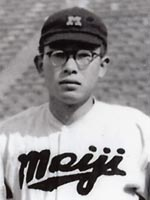
- Pitcher
- Born: December 15, 1920; Wakayama, Wakayama
- Died: March 29, 1945 (aged 24) off the coast of Indochina
- Batted: Left Threw: Left

Member of the Japanese

Baseball Hall of Fame
- Induction: 2008

Seiichi Shima (嶋清一, Shima Seiichi; December 15, 1920 – March 29, 1945) was a baseball player who pitched for Kaisou Central High School and Meiji University of the Tokyo Big6 Baseball League. He never got to play professionally, as he was drafted into the Imperial Japanese Navy in 1945. He died during World War II, on March 29, 1945, off the coast of Indochina. He was inducted into the Japanese Baseball Hall of Fame in 2008.

Shima represented Kaisou Central in the 1939 Japanese High School Baseball Championship, where he shut out all five of the opposing teams, only allowed five hits, struck out 57 batters, and pitched no-hitters in the semifinal and final rounds. Shima began to play for Meiji University in 1940.
