= Japanese Baseball Hall of Fame =

Baseball Hall of Fame and Museum
- 野球殿堂
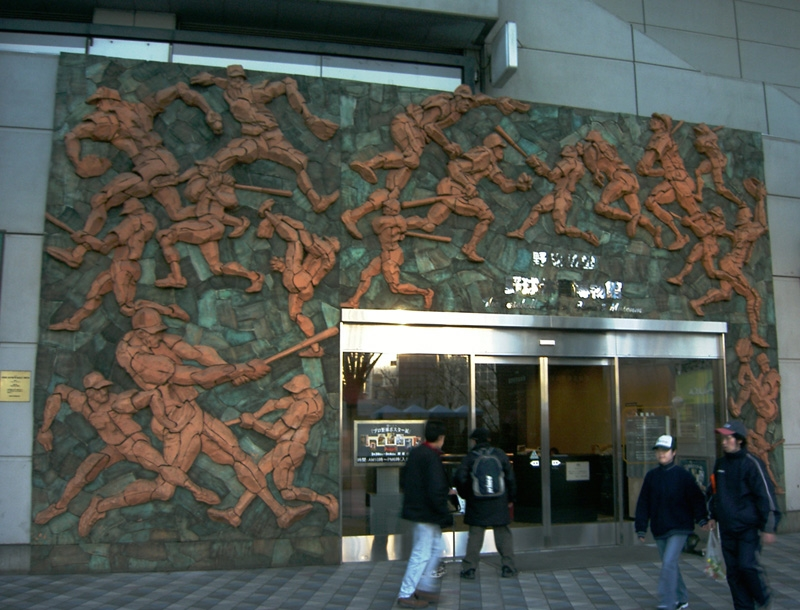
- Established: 1959
- Location: Tokyo Dome, Bunkyō, Tokyo, Japan
- Coordinates: 35.705658°N 139.751914°E
- Type: Professional sports hall of fame
- Director: Norio Ichino
- Website: baseball-museum.or.jp (in Japanese)

The Baseball Hall of Fame and Museum (野球体育博物館, Yakyū Taiiku Hakubutsukan), commonly known outside of Japan as the Japanese Baseball Hall of Fame, is a hall of fame and museum in Tokyo dedicated to professional baseball, with a prominent focus on professional baseball in Japan. The Hall is intended to honor and commemorate inducted players, executives, umpires, and other individuals who developed and/or made a significant impact towards the sport of baseball in Japan.

== History ==
The Japanese Baseball Hall of Fame was established in 1959. They inducted nine members in the first class. It was originally located next door to Korakuen Stadium, then-home for the Tokyo Giants and Kokutetsu Swallows of the Central League and the Mainichi Orions of the Pacific League. Following the closure of Korakuen Stadium in 1988, the Hall moved to its current location within the Tokyo Dome, the stadium built as Korakuen's successor and the Giants' subsequent home.

Individuals are primarily inducted as members of the Japanese Baseball Hall after gaining at least 75% of votes on a ballot of players or expert voters. The Hall's special committee is also able to elect and induct other individuals deemed to have a notable connection to the sport, such as composer Yuji Koseki, who was inducted in 2023 for his creation of the Hanshin Tigers cheer song "Rokko Oroshi."

== The museum ==
The Japanese Baseball Hall of Fame's museum depicts numerous artifacts and moments from Japanese baseball history, ranging from uniforms of each team, that has played in the Central and Pacific Leagues, in addition to American baseball memorabilia, such as that of Ken Griffey Jr. and Babe Ruth. The uniform of Sadaharu Oh alongside the home run bats and balls in his career, most notably the bat for his 800th home run, are also on display.

As of 2024, days of operation for the museum were Tuesday through Sunday (except for December 29-January 1) for most weeks, with Mondays only being open during spring and summer school vacations, national holidays that fell on the day or games when the Yomiuri Giants play at the Tokyo Dome. Operating hours are 10am until 5pm, with Giants games extending the time to 6pm. Admission costs are 600 yen per adult, 400 yen for students over 15, 200 yen for students 15 or under and 400 yen for people aged 65 or older.

== Key ==
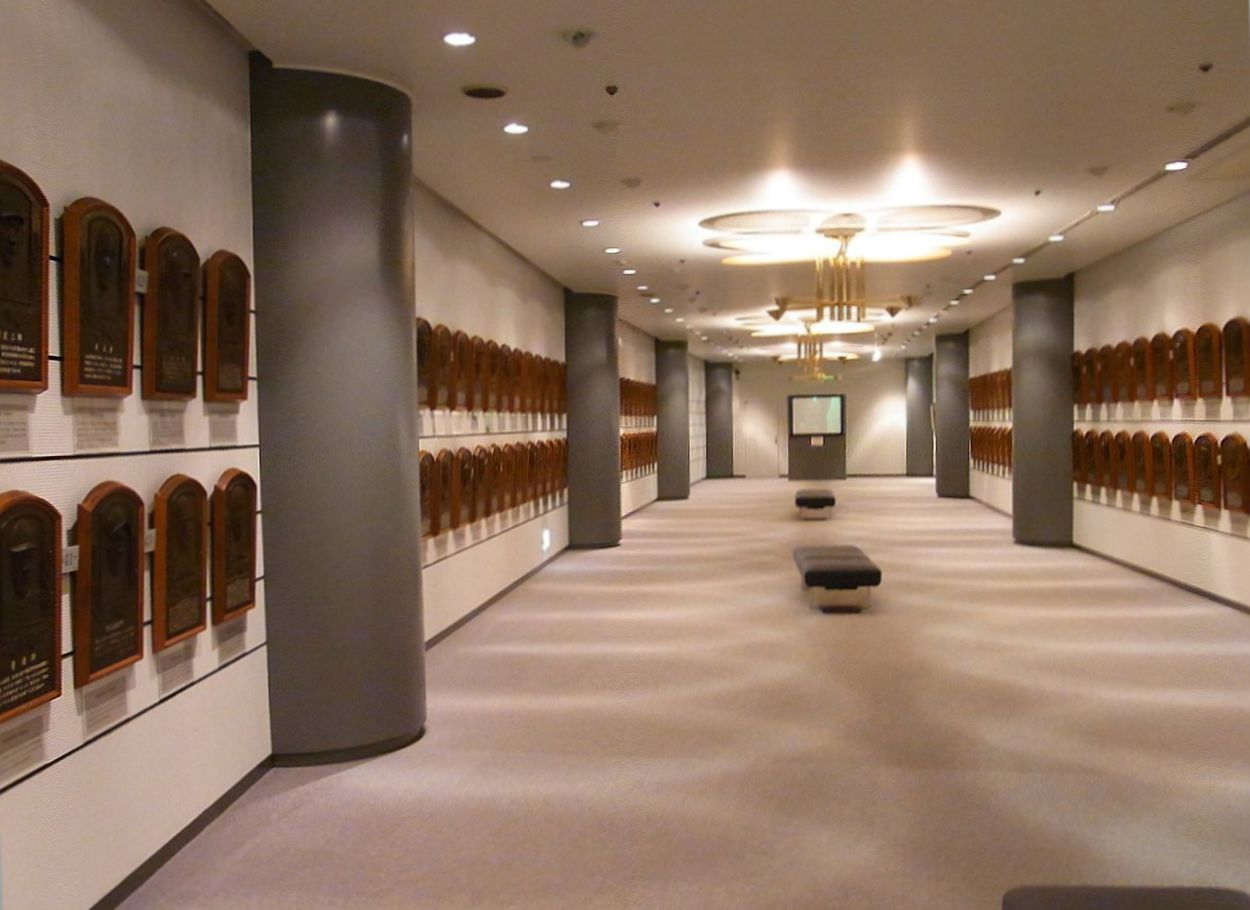
Inside the Japanese Baseball Hall of Fame

P	Pitcher
C	Catcher
1B	First baseman
2B	Second baseman
3B	Third baseman
SS	Shortstop
LF	Left fielder
CF	Center fielder
RF	Right fielder
DH	Designated hitter

== List of inductees ==
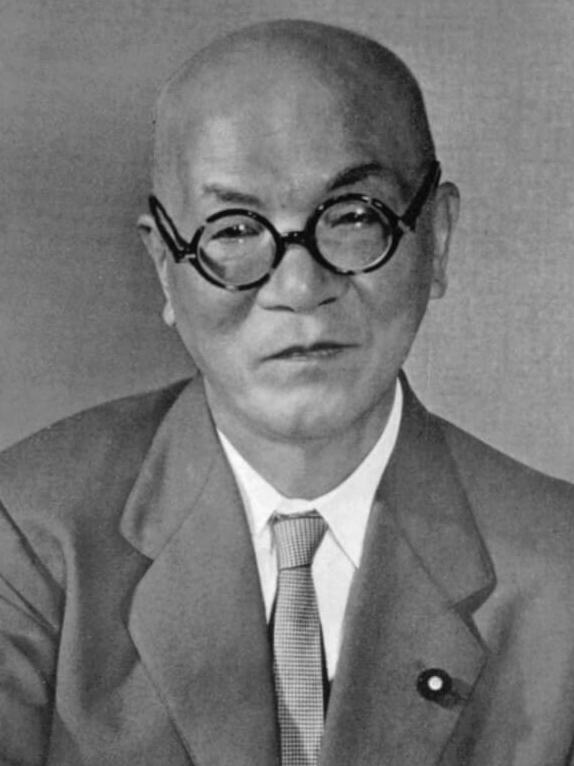
Matsutarō Shōriki was the first inductee into the Japanese Baseball Hall of Fame in 1959.

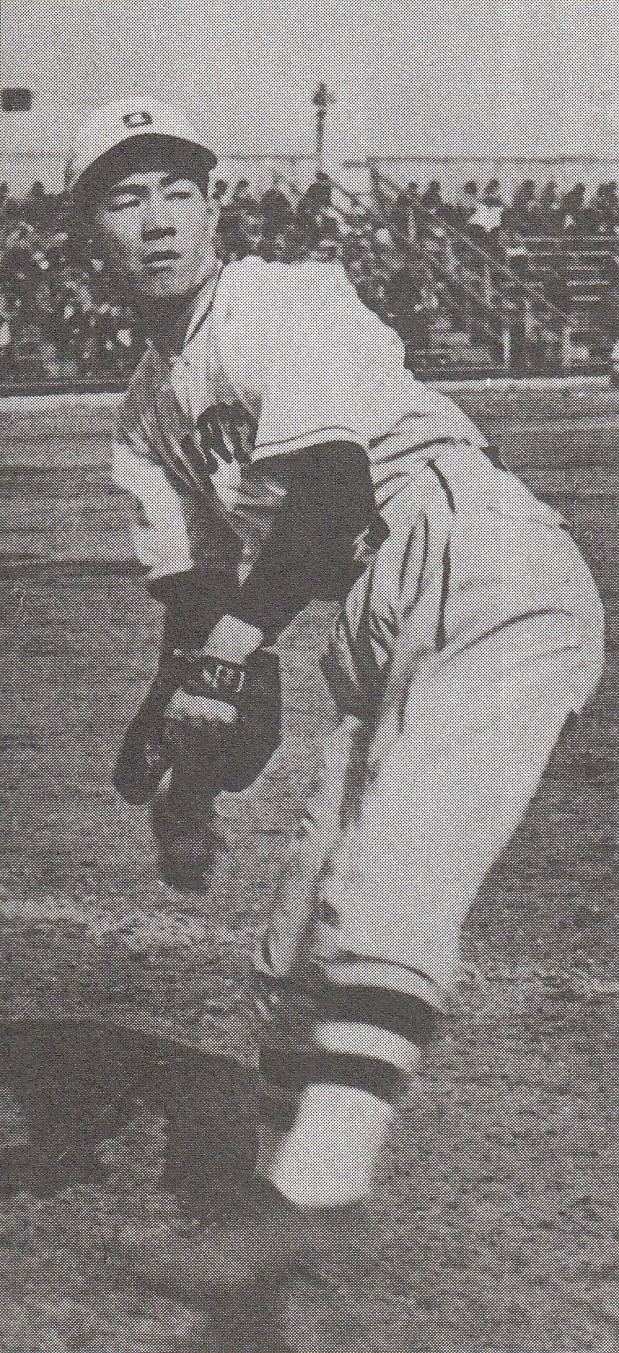
Eiji Sawamura was the first player in the Japanese Baseball League / Nippon Professional Baseball era to be inducted in 1959

Overview of members of the Baseball Hall of Fame
#	Year	Induction method	Name	Place of Birth	Achievements	Ref.
1	1959	Special	Matsutaro Shoriki	Toyama Prefecture	Popularized professional baseball in Japan; owner of Yomiuri Shimbun that organized a Japanese baseball All-Star team in 1934 to face an American All-Star team; went professional with his group that eventually became known as the Yomiuri Giants; chairman of the board of directors of the Japan Baseball Federation; Matsutaro Shoriki Award named in his honor in 1977 for contributions to baseball	
2	1959	Special	Hiraoka Hiroshi	Tokyo	Founder of the first all-Japanese club with Shinbashi Athletic Club in 1878.	
3	1959	Special	Yokio Aoi	Tochigi Prefecture	Top pitcher for Daiichi High School baseball team in 1896, later coached amateur players while translating baseball rules into Japanese	
4	1959	Special	Abe Isoo	Fukuoka Prefecture	"Father of Japanese baseball"; founded baseball club at Waseda University in 1901	
5	1959	Special	Shin Hashido	Tokyo	Star captain of Waseda University baseball team in 1900s; planned and promoted Intercity baseball tournament	
6	1959	Special	Kiyoshi Oshikawa	Miyagi Prefecture	Star player at Waseba University in 1900s before participating in first tour of the U.S. by Japanese team in 1905; founded professional team with Nihon Athletic Association in 1920	
7	1959	Special	Jiro Kuji	Iwate Prefecture	Star pitcher at Waseda University; played for team of Japanese star players in 1934 Japan Tour versus American talent	
8	1959	Special	Eiji Sawamura	Mie Prefecture	Star pitcher for Tokyo Kyojin (1936–1937, 1940–1941, 1943) who pitched three no-hitters (the first in the Japanese Baseball League), was named first MVP of the league in 1937 spring season; killed in action in 1944 at the age of 27; award named in his honor since 1947 for best pitcher in Japanese baseball	
9	1959	Special	Michimaro Ono	Kanagawa Prefecture	Star for Keio University, Mita Club, and Osaka Mainichi Baseball Team; first Japanese pitcher to defeat a team of American All-Stars on November 19, 1922 before becoming a sports reporter in his later years	
10	1960	Competitors	Victor Starffin	Nizhny Tagil, Russian Empire	Star pitcher for Tokyo Kyojin (1934–1944), Pacific/Taiyo Robins (1946–1947), Kinsei / Daiei Stars (1948–1953), Takahashi / Tombow Unions (1954–1955); 2-time JBL MVP (1939, 1940), won a league record 42 games in 1939; career record of 303–176 with a record 83 shutouts made him first 300-game winner in Japanese baseball	
11	1960	Special	Atsushi Kono	Nagano Prefecture	Star pitcher at Waseda University in early 1900s that served as pioneer to modern pitching techniques	
12	1960	Special	Yaichiro Sakurai	Ibaraki Prefecture	Star pitcher and slugger at Keio University that served as president of the Mita Club	
13	1960	Special	Chujun Tobita	Ishikawa Prefecture	Second baseman and coach for Waseda University that also served as influential presence in amateur baseball as writer and columnist	
14	1962	Competitors	Yutaka Ikeda	Tokyo		
15	1962	Special	Tadao Ichioka	Nagano Prefecture		
16	1963	Competitors	Haruyasu Nakajima	Nagano Prefecture		
17	1964	Competitors	Tadashi Wakabayashi	Wahiawa, Hawaii Territory		
18	1964	Special	Kiyoshi Miyahara	Nagano Prefecture		
19	1965	Competitors	Tetsuharu Kawakami	Kumamoto Prefecture		
20	1965	Competitors	Kazuto Tsuruoka	Hiroshima Prefecture		
21	1965	Special	Nobori Inoue	Chiba Prefecture		
22	1965	Special	Saburo Miyatake	Kagawa Prefecture		
23	1965	Special	Masaru Kageura	Ehime Prefecture		
24	1966	Special	Tsunetaro Moriyama	Tokyo		
25	1967	Special	Hisashi Koshimoto	Hawaii	Head coach of Keidai University that won seven Tokyo Big6 Baseball League championships	
26	1968	Special	Sotaro Suzuki	Gunma Prefecture		
27	1968	Special	Munehide Tanabe	Yamanashi Prefecture		
28	1968	Special	Ichizō Kobayashi	Yamanashi Prefecture		
29	1969	Competitors	Hisanori Karita	Kanagawa Prefecture		
30	1969	Special	Daisuke Miyake	Tokyo		
31	1969	Special	Takeo Tabe	Hiroshima Prefecture		
32	1969	Special	Jiro Morioka	Nara Prefecture		
33	1969	Special	Zensuke Shimada	Tochigi Prefecture		
34	1969	Special	Yoriyasu Arima	Tokyo		
35	1970	Competitors	Shunichi Amachi	Hyogo Prefecture		
36	1970	Competitors	Nobuaki Nidegawa	Hyogo Prefecture		
37	1970	Special	Komajiro Tamura	Osaka Prefecture		
38	1970	Special	Matsutaro Naoki	Kyoto Prefecture		
39	1970	Special	Kanoe Chuma	Kagoshima Prefecture		
40	1971	Special	Tokuro Konishi	Tokyo		
41	1971	Special	Rihachi Mizuno	Gifu Prefecture		
42	1972	Competitors	Shuichi Ishimoto	Hiroshima Prefecture		
43	1972	Special	Takeji Nakano	Tokyo		
44	1972	Special	Shigeru Ohta	Kagawa Prefecture		
45	1973	Special	Kohzo Utsumi	Kanagawa Prefecture		
46	1973	Special	Teiyu Amano	Kanagawa Prefecture		
47	1973	Special	Kenzo Hirose	Aichi Prefecture		
48	1974	Competitors	Sadayoshi Fujimoto	Hiroshima Prefecture		
49	1974	Competitors	Fumio Fujimura	Ehime Prefecture		
50	1974	Special	Seizo Noda	Hyogo Prefecture		
51	1976	Competitors	Hideo Fujimoto	Busan, Korea		
52	1976	Special	Shinzo Koizumi	Tokyo		
53	1977	Competitors	Shigeru Mizuhara	Kagawa Prefecture		
54	1977	Competitors	Michio Nishizawa	Tokyo		
55	1977	Special	Shigeo Mori	Ehime Prefecture		
56	1977	Special	Yukio Nishimura	Mie Prefecture		
57	1978	Competitors	Kenjiro Matsuki	Fukui Prefecture		
58	1978	Competitors	Shinji Hamazaki	Hiroshima Prefecture		
59	1978	Special	Yasuhiro Itami	Kagawa Prefecture		
60	1978	Special	Masaki Yoshihara	Kumamoto Prefecture		
61	1978	Special	Okada Genzaburo	Tokyo		
62	1979	Competitors	Takehiko Bessho	Hyogo Prefecture		
63	1979	Special	Ryozo Hiranuma	Kanagawa Prefecture		
64	1979	Special	Goro Taniguchi	Saga Prefecture		
65	1980	Competitors	Hiroshi Ohshita	Hyogo Prefecture		
66	1980	Competitors	Makoto Kozuru	Fukuoka Prefecture		
67	1980	Special	Shigeru Chiba	Ehime Prefecture		
68	1981	Competitors	Tokuji Iida	Kanagawa Prefecture		
69	1981	Competitors	Yoshiyuki Iwamoto	Hiroshima Prefecture		
70	1981	Special	Tatsuo Saeki	Hyogo Prefecture		
71	1981	Special	Shotaro Ogawa	Wakayama Prefecture		
72	1982	Special	Ryuji Suzuki	Tokyo		
73	1982	Special	Mojuro Tonooka	Shizuoka Prefecture		
74	1983	Competitors	Osamu Mihara	Kagawa Prefecture		
75	1983	Special	Uchimura Yushi	Tokyo		
76	1984	Special	Shinji Kirihara	Osaka Prefecture		
77	1985	Competitors	Shigeru Sugishita	Tokyo		
78	1985	Competitors	Katsumi Shiraishi	Ehime Prefecture		
79	1985	Competitors	Atsushi Aramaki	Oita Prefecture		
80	1985	Special	Katsuo Tanaka	Osaka Prefecture		
81	1985	Special	Ikushi Yamanouchi	Shimane Prefecture		
82	1986	Special	Miyoshi Nakagawa	Tottori Prefecture		
83	1986	Special	Masao Matsukata	Kagoshima Prefecture		
84	1987	Special	Nobuo Fujita	Tianjin, China	Manager of Hosei University baseball team that won Tokyo Big6 Baseball League four times	
85	1987	Special	Minoru Yamashita	Hyogo Prefecture	Star slugger at Keio University; played professional baseball for Hankyu (1936-194), Nagoya (1942) before becoming umpire	
86	1988	Competitors	Shigeo Nagashima	Chiba Prefecture	Third baseman for Yomiuri Giants (1958–1974); 444 HR, 2,471 hits, 1,522 RBIs as player; named to the Best Nine Award in all 17 seasons played, five-time Central League MVP, 4-time Japan Series MVP, CL Rookie of the Year, 11-time Japan Series champion	
87	1988	Competitors	Kaoru Betto	Osaka Prefecture		
88	1988	Competitors	Yukio Nishimoto	Wakayama Prefecture		
89	1988	Competitors	Masaichi Kaneda	Aichi Prefecture		
90	1988	Special	Saburo Yokozawa	Taipei, Taiwan		
91	1988	Special	Takeo Akuta	Hyogo Prefecture		
92	1988	Special	Masaichi Nagata	Kyoto Prefecture		
93	1989	Competitors	Hidenosuke Shima	Hyogo Prefecture		
94	1989	Competitors	Katsuya Nomura	Kyoto Prefecture	Catcher for Nankai Hawks (1954–1977), Lotte Orions (1978), Seibu Lions (1979–1980); 2,901 hits, 657 HR, 1,988 RBIs, .277 BA; five-time Pacific League MVP, 19-time Best Nine Award, 9-time PL home run leader, 1965 Triple Crown, 2-time Japan Series champion	
95	1989	Competitors	Jiro Noguchi	Aichi Prefecture		
96	1989	Special	Tsuneo Ikeda	Niigata Prefecture	Writer and chief editor for Baseball World in the 1930s before establishing Baseball Magazine (BBM) in 1940s	
97	1989	Special	Masao Date	Osaka Prefecture		
98	1990	Competitors	Juzo Sanada	Wakayama Prefecture		
99	1990	Competitors	Isao Harimoto	Hiroshima Prefecture		
100	1990	Special	Isamu Saeki	Ehime Prefecture		
101	1991	Competitors	Shigeru Makino	Kagawa Prefecture		
102	1991	Competitors	Osamu Tsutsui	Kagawa Prefecture		
103	1991	Competitors	Kichiro Shimaoka	Nagano Prefecture		
104	1991	Special	Yoshio Nakazawa	Tokyo		
105	1992	Competitors	Tatsuro Hirooka	Hiroshima Prefecture		
106	1992	Competitors	Tsubouchi Michinori	Ehime Prefecture		
107	1992	Competitors	Yoshio Yoshida	Kyoto Prefecture		
108	1992	Special	Masao Yoshida	Aichi Prefecture	Star pitcher in the National High School Baseball Championship between 1931 and 1933 that won 14 straight games at Koshien Stadium; first (and only) pitcher to win three consecutive championships; later served as outfielder at Meiji University, amateur pitcher for Fujikura Electric Wire and then sports reporter	
109	1993	Competitors	Kazuhisa Inao	Oita Prefecture		
110	1993	Competitors	Minoru Murayama	Hyogo Prefecture		
111	1994	Competitors	Sadaharu Oh	Tokyo	Player for Yomiuri Giants (1959–1980); hit world record 868 home runs to go with NPB record for OPS (1.079) and runs (2,170); won Central League MVP nine times, Best Nine Award at first base 18 times; 11-time Japan Series champion	
112	1994	Competitors	Wally Yonamine	Olowalu, Hawaii Territory	Outfielder for Yomiuri Giants (1951–1960), Chunichi Dragons (1961–1962) who hit .311; Central League MVP (1957), 8-time All-Star (1952-1959), 7-time Best Nine Award (1952-1958), 4-time Japan Series champion (1951, 1952, 1953, 1955)	
113	1994	Special	Tomoo Hirooka	Osaka Prefecture		
114	1995	Competitors	Tadashi Sugiura	Aichi Prefecture		
115	1995	Competitors	Tokichiro Ishii	Ibaraki Prefecture		
116	1995	Special	Shosei Go	Tainan City, Taiwan		
117	1995	Special	Minoru Murakami	Osaka Prefecture		
118	1996	Competitors	Motoshi Fujita	Ehime Prefecture		
119	1996	Competitors	Sachio Kinugasa	Kyoto Prefecture		
120	1996	Special	Naotaka Makino	Kagoshima Prefecture		
121	1996	Special	Makoto Hosaka	Manchuria, China		
122	1997	Competitors	Katsuo Osugi	Okayama Prefecture		
123	1997	Special	Eiichiro Yamamoto	Okayama Prefecture		
124	1998	Special	Hiroshi Nakao	Mie Prefecture		
125	1998	Special	Shinjiro Iguchi	Wakayama Prefecture		
126	1999	Competitors	Futoshi Nakanishi	Kagawa Prefecture		
127	1999	Competitors	Yoshinori Hirose	Hiroshima Prefecture		
128	1999	Competitors	Takeshi Koba	Kumamoto Prefecture		
129	1999	Competitors	Sadao Kondoh	Aichi Prefecture		
130	1999	Special	Ichiro Yoshikuni	Kanagawa Prefecture	Commissioner of Nippon Professional Baseball from 1989 to 1998	
131	2000	Competitors	Shintaro Fukushima	Tottori Prefecture		
132	2000	Special	Tetsuya Yoneda	Tokyo		
133	2001	Competitors	Rikuo Nemoto	Ibaraki Prefecture		
134	2001	Competitors	Masaaki Koyama	Hyogo Prefecture		
135	2001	Special	Tsutomu Takeda	Hiroshima Prefecture		
136	2001	Special	Ryohei Hasegawa	Aichi Prefecture		
137	2002	Competitors	Kazuhiro Yamauchi	Aichi Prefecture		
138	2002	Competitors	Keishi Suzuki	Hyogo Prefecture		
139	2002	Competitors	Yutaka Fukumoto	Osaka Prefecture		
140	2002	Competitors	Kenjiro Tamiya	Ibaraki Prefecture		
141	2002	Special	Fujio Nakazawa	Shiga Prefecture		
142	2002	New Century Committee	Ikuhara Akihiro	Fukuoka Prefecture		
143	2002	New Century Committee	Lefty O'Doul	California, U.S.	Served as goodwill ambassador for baseball that spread its popularity in Japan	
144	2002	Special	Masaoka Shiki	Ehime Prefecture		
145	2003	Competitors	Toshiharu Ueda	Tokushima Prefecture		
146	2003	Competitors	Junzo Sekine	Tokyo		
147	2003	Special	Kohei Matsuda	Hiroshima Prefecture		
148	2003	New Century Committee	Horace Wilson	Goram, Maine, U.S.	Often called one of people credited with introducing the sport of baseball to Japan in 1870s	
149	2003	Special	Sakae Suzuka	Kyoto Prefecture		
150	2004	Competitors	Akira Ohgi	Fukuoka Prefecture		
151	2004	Special	Noboru Akiyama	Okayama Prefecture		
152	2005	Competitors	Choji Murata	Hiroshima Prefecture		
153	2005	Competitors	Masaaki Mori	Gifu Prefecture		
154	2005	Special	Masayori Shimura	Tokyo Prefecture		
155	2006	Competitors	Hiromitsu Kadota	Yamaguchi Prefecture		
156	2006	Competitors	Morimichi Takagi	Aichi Prefecture		
157	2006	Competitors	Hisashi Yamada	Akita Prefecture		
158	2006	Special	Hiromori Kawashima	Fukushima Prefecture	Commissioner of Nippon Professional Baseball from 1998 to 2004; signed agreement with Major League Baseball for "posting system" involving players wishing to negotiate between leagues	
159	2006	Special	Yasumitsu Toyoda	Ibaraki Prefecture		
160	2007	Competitors	Takao Kajimoto	Tajimi City, Gifu Prefecture		
161	2007	Special	Reiichi Matsunaka	Kitakyushu City, Fukuoka Prefecture		
162	2008	Competitors	Tsuneo Horiuchi	Hiroshima Prefecture		
163	2008	Competitors	Seiichi Shima	Yamanashi Prefecture		
164	2008	Special	Koji Yamamoto	Wakayama Prefecture		
165	2009	Competitors	Tsutomu Wakamatsu	Hokkaido		
166	2009	Competitors	Noboru Aota	Hyogo Prefecture		
167	2009	Special	Ichiro Kimishima	Kagawa Prefecture		
168	2009	Special	Yoshinori Okoso	Tochigi Prefecture		
169	2010	Competitors	Osamu Higashio	Wakayama Prefecture		
170	2010	Competitors	Shinichi Eto	Kumamoto Prefecture		
171	2010	Special	Masayuki Furuta	Kumamoto Prefecture		
172	2011	Competitors	Hiromitsu Ochiai	Akita Prefecture	Infielder/Outfielder for Lotte Orions (1979–1986), Chunichi Dragons (1987–1993), Yomiuri Giants (1994–1996), Nippon-Ham Fighters (1997–1998); 510 HR, .311 BA, 2,371 hits, 1,564 RBI; 2-time Pacific League MVP (1982, 1985); won Best Nine Award ten times, winning ones at first base, second base, and third base; only Japanese player with three batting Triple Crowns; Japan Series champion as player (1994) and manager (2007)	
173	2011	Competitors	Mutsuo Minagawa	Yamagata Prefecture		
174	2012	Competitors	Tsunemi Tsuda	Kagoshima Prefecture		
175	2012	Competitors	Manabu Kitabeppu	Yamaguchi Prefecture		
176	2012	Special	Kiro Osafune	Okayama Prefecture		
177	2012	Special	Osamu Omoto	Okayama Prefecture		
178	2013	Competitors	Yutaka Ohno	Shimane Prefecture		
179	2013	Competitors	Yoshiro Sotokoba	Kagoshima Prefecture		
180	2013	Special	Kazuo Fukushima	Fukuoka Prefecture		
181	2014	Competitors	Koji Akiyama	Osaka Prefecture		
182	2014	Competitors	Hideo Nomo	Kumamoto Prefecture		
183	2014	Competitors	Kazuhiro Sasaki	Miyagi Prefecture		
184	2014	Special	Choichi Aida	Hokkaido		
185	2015	Competitors	Atsuya Furuta	Hyogo Prefecture		
186	2015	Special	Kazuo Hayashi	Tokyo		
187	2015	Special	Ryohei Murayama	Mie Prefecture		
188	2016	Competitors	Masaki Saito	Saitama Prefecture		
189	2016	Competitors	Kimiyasu Kudō	Aichi Prefecture		
190	2016	Competitors	Kihachi Enomoto	Tokyo		
191	2016	Special	Takizo Matsumoto	Hiroshima Prefecture		
192	2016	Special	Masatake Yamanaka	Oita Prefecture		
193	2017	Competitors	Tsutomu Itō	Kumamoto Prefecture		
194	2017	Competitors	Masaji Hiramatsu	Okayama Prefecture		
195	2017	Competitors	Senichi Hoshino	Okayama Prefecture		
196	2017	Special	Hiroshi Goshi	Hokkaido		
197	2017	Special	Mirei Suzuki	Hyogo Prefecture		
198	2018	Competitors	Hideki Matsui	Ishikawa Prefecture		
199	2018	Competitors	Tomoaki Kanemoto	Hiroshima Prefecture		
200	2018	Competitors	Tatsunori Hara	Kanagawa Prefecture		
201	2018	Special	Masao Taki	Aichi Prefecture		
202	2019	Competitors	Kazuyoshi Tatsunami	Osaka Prefecture		
203	2019	Competitors	Hiroshi Gondoh	Saga Prefecture		
204	2019	Special	Haruo Wakimura	Tokyo	former chairman of the Japan High School Baseball Federation	
205	2020	Competitors	Kōichi Tabuchi	Tokyo	Star player for Hanshin Tigers (1969–1978) and Seibu Lions (1979–1984) who hit 474 home runs; 2-time Japan Series champion (1982, 1983), 5-time Best Nine Award (1972-1976)	
206	2020	Special	Yukichi Maeda	Kochi Prefecture	Keio University coach (1960-1965, 1982-1993), Secretary General of Baseball Federation of Asia (1997-2006); three-time champion of Tokyo Big 6 League as player	
207	2020	Special	Renzo Ishii	Ibaraki Prefecture	Longtime coach of Waseda University baseball; Active proponent of international baseball, most notably with Japan-USA Collegiate Baseball Championship Series	
208	2021	Special	Katsuji Kawashima	Tochigi Prefecture		
209	2021	Special	Kazuo Sayama	Wakayama Prefecture	Baseball historian and author of articles and books on baseball history	
210	2022	Competitors	Masa Yamamoto	Hiroshima Prefecture		
211	2022	Competitors	Shingo Takatsu	Kanagawa Prefecture		
212	2022	Special	Shigeyoshi Matsumae	Kumamoto Prefecture	Chairman of Tokyo Metropolitan Area University Baseball League, active proponent of baseball being played at the 1988 Summer Olympics	
213	2023	Competitors	Alex Ramírez	Venezuela		
214	2023	Competitors	Randy Bass	Oklahoma, U.S.	Hanshin Tigers (1983–1988); 2x Japanese Triple Crown (1985, 1986), Central League MVP (1985), Japan Series champion (1985), 3x Best Nine Award (1985–1987); his .389 season in 1986 remains the NPB record for one season	
215	2023	Special	Yuji Koseki	Fukushima Prefecture		
216	2024	Competitors	Hiroki Kuroda	Hiroshima Prefecture		
217	2024	Competitors	Motonobu Tanishige	Osaka Prefecture		
218	2024	Special	Tomoichi Tanimura	New York, U.S.	Umpire for 3,026 games in the Central League, which included umpiring the Japan Series eleven times	
219	2025	Competitors	Ichiro Suzuki	Aichi Prefecture	Orix Blue Wave (1992–2000), Seattle Mariners (2001–2012), New York Yankees (2012–2014), Miami Marlins (2015–2017), Seattle Mariners (2018–2019); 17-time combined All-Star (7 NPB, 10 MLB), 17-time combined Gold Glove (7 NPB, 10 MLB), 7-time Best Nine Award, 3-time Silver Slugger Award, Matsutaro Shoriki Award (1994, 1995), 9-time batting champion (7 Pacific, 2 American); Japan Series champion (1996); 3-time Pacific League MVP; first Japanese player to have 4,000 professional career hits	
220	2025	Competitors	Hitoki Iwase	Aichi Prefecture		
221	2025	Competitors	Masayuki Kakefu	Chiba Prefecture		
222	2025	Special	Hiroya Tomizawa	Tokyo	Umpire of Central League games for 35 years	
223	2026	Competitors	Hideki Kuriyama	Tokyo		

== Gallery ==
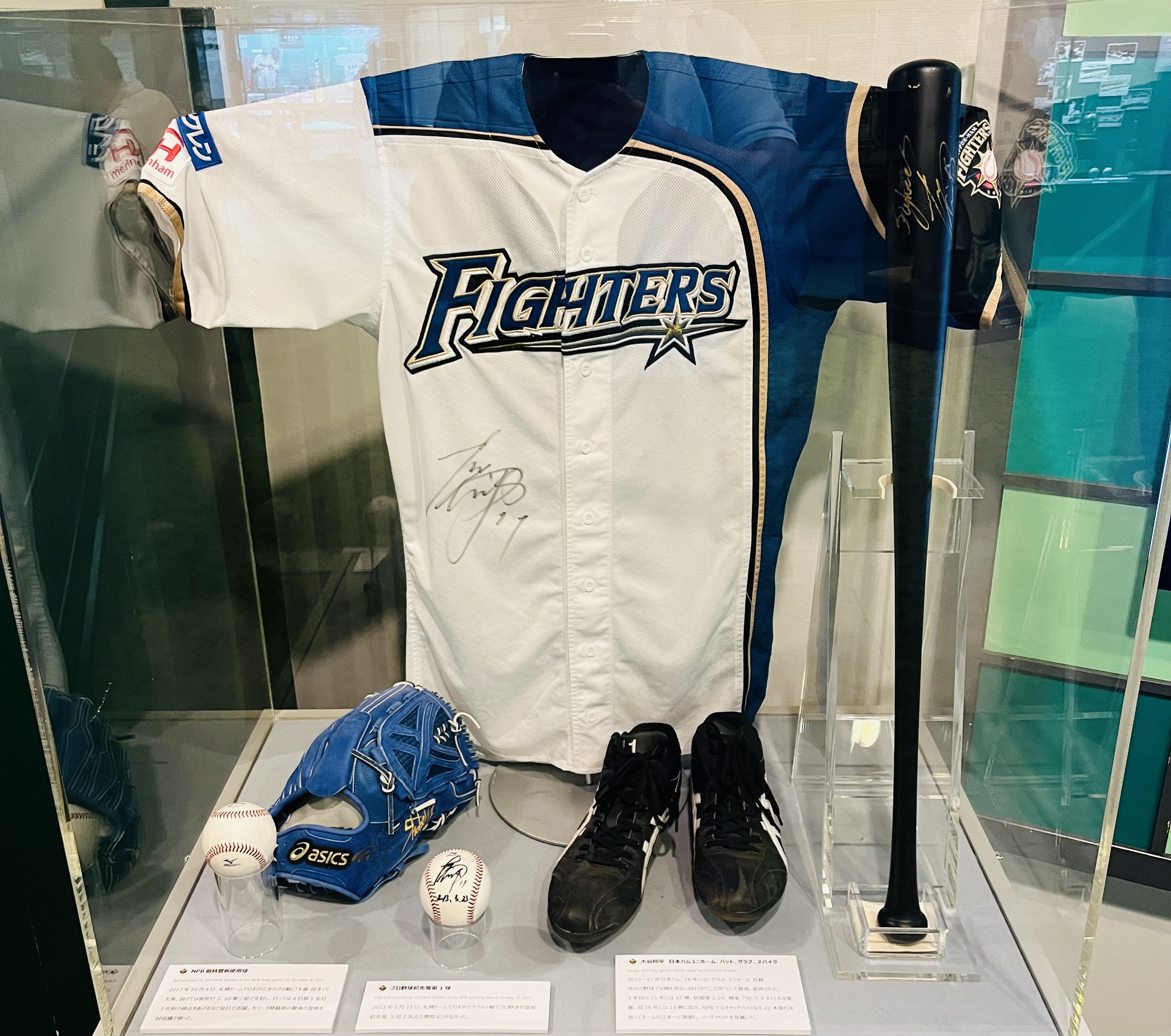
A collection of Shohei Ohtani's memorabilia and equipment from his time with the Hokkaido Nippon-Ham Fighters in the NPB.

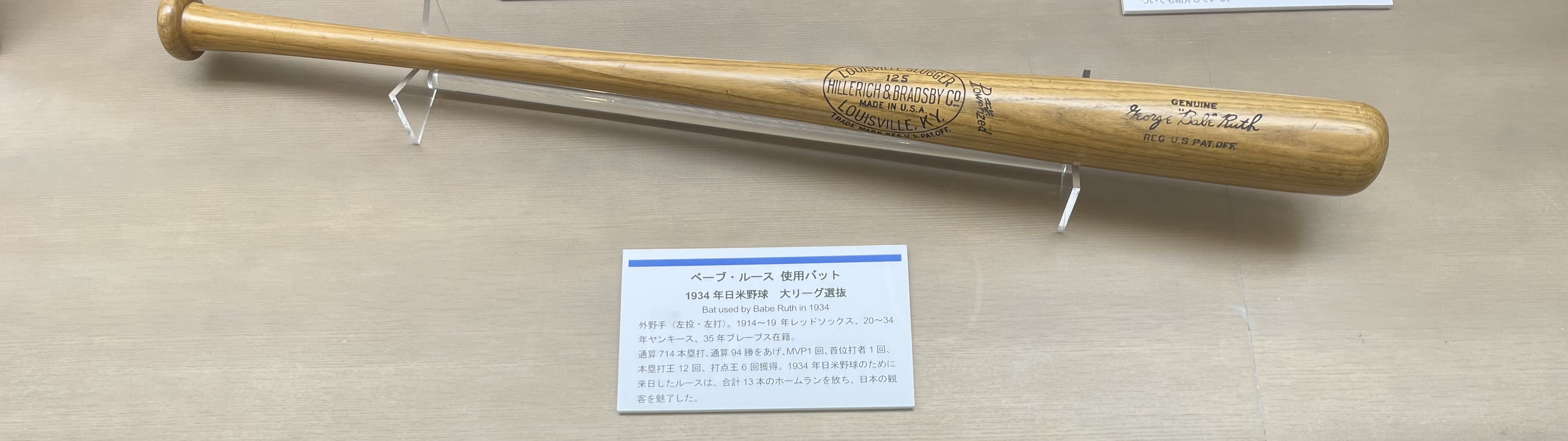
Bat used by Babe Ruth held by the Japanese Baseball Hall of Fame.

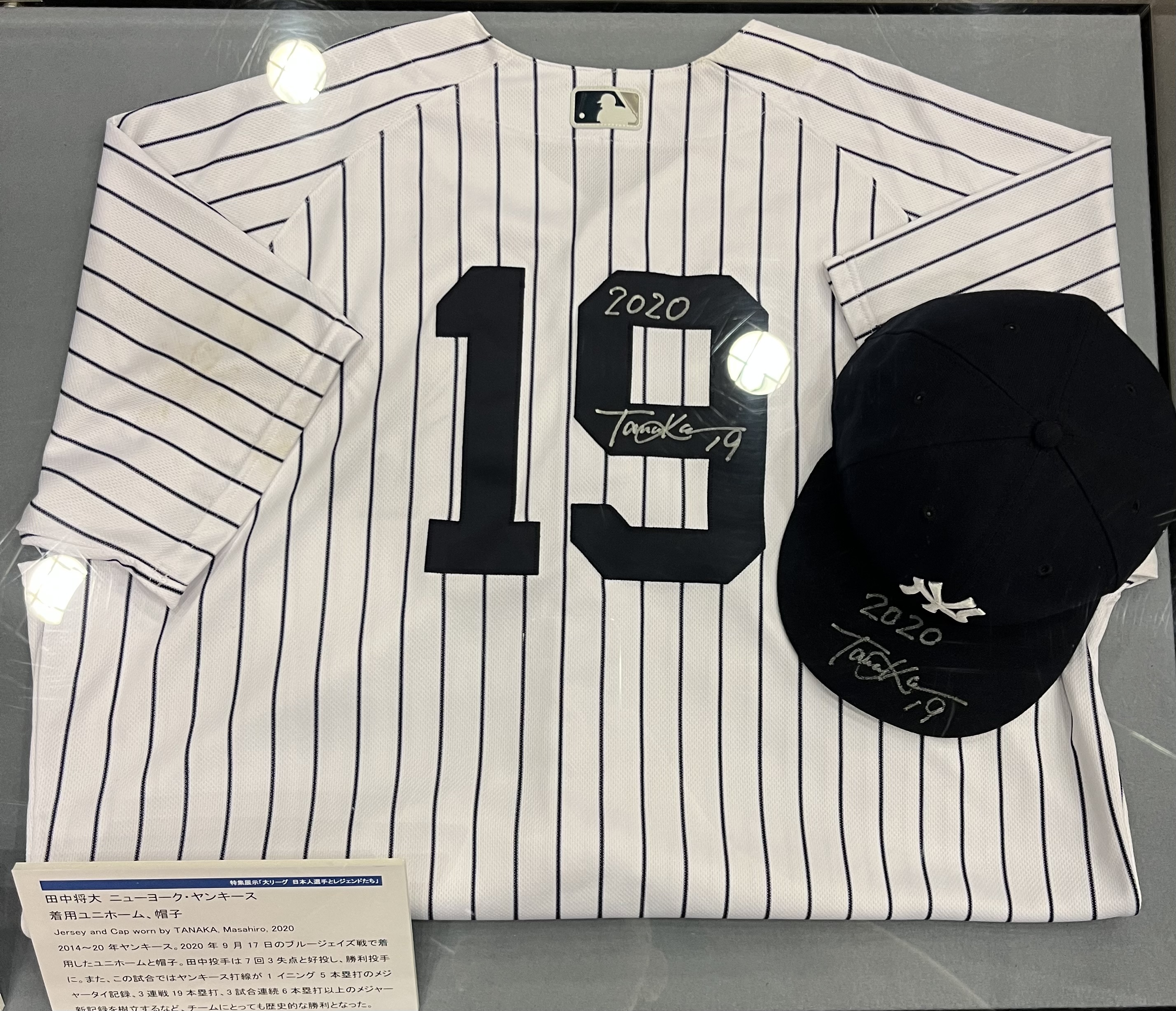
Masahiro Tanaka autographed New York Yankees jersey and cap held by the Japanese Baseball Hall of Fame.

== See also ==
- The Meikyukai ("Association of Great Players" or "Golden Players Club") (also a Japanese baseball hall of fame)
- Nisei Baseball Research Project
- Professional baseball in Japan
