= Tsunetaro Moriyama =

Japanese baseball player (1880–1912)

- Pitcher
- Born: April 29, 1880; Tokyo, Japan
- Died: February 12, 1912 (aged 31)
- Threw: Left

Teams
- First Higher School

Member of the Japanese

Baseball Hall of Fame
- Induction: 1966

Tsunetaro Moriyama (守山 恒太郎, Moriyama Tsunetarō; 27 April 1880 – 12 February 1912) was a Japanese baseball player.

== Career ==
Born in Tokyo, he was a southpaw pitcher for the First Higher School (Ikkō). He was famous for his hard training which enabled Ikkō to defeat the Yokohama Country & Athletic Club (YC&AC), the strongest team in Japan baseball during the late 1800s, after first losing to them. He later studied medicine at Tokyo Imperial University and became a military doctor, but died when he was infected by the infectious disease he was studying.

He was inducted into the Japanese Baseball Hall of Fame in 1966.
