= Shinji Hamazaki =

Japanese baseball player and manager (1901–1981)

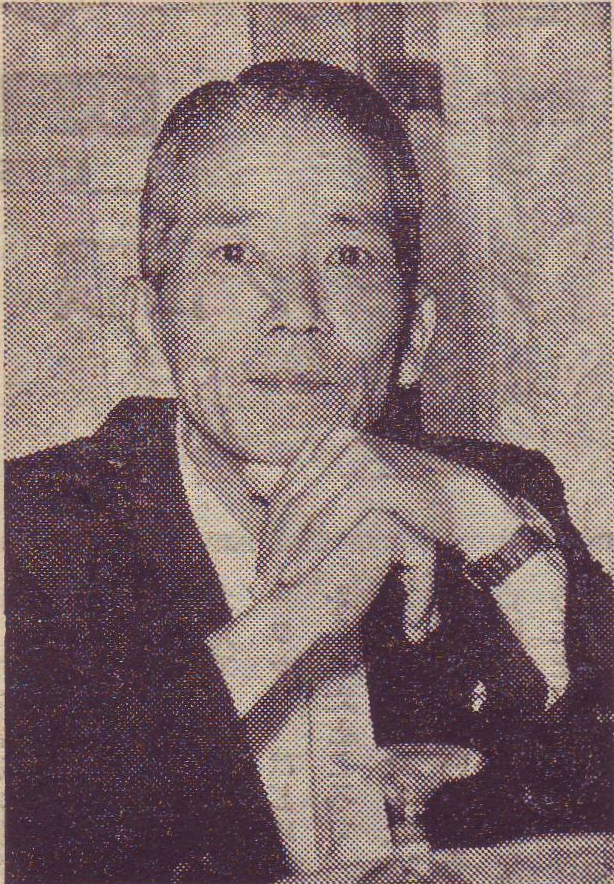
- Hamazaki in 1959
- Pitcher, Manager
- Born: December 10, 1901; Kure, Hiroshima, Japan
- Died: May 6, 1981 (aged 79)
- Batted: Left Threw: Left

JBL debut
- 1947, for the Hankyu Braves

Last NPB appearance
- 1950, for the Hankyu Braves

NPB statistics (through 1950)
- Win–loss record: 5–5
- ERA: 4.03
- Strikeouts: 23
- Stats at Baseball Reference

Teams
- As player: Hankyu Braves (1947–1948, 1950); As manager: Hankyu Braves (1947–1953); Takahashi/Tombo Unions (1954–1955); Kokutetsu Swallows (1961)

Member of the Japanese

Baseball Hall of Fame
- Induction: 1978
- Election method: Selection Committee for Players.

Shinji Hamazaki (浜崎 真二, 10 December 1901 – May 6, 1981) was a Japanese baseball player and manager. Thought short in stature, Hamazaki was well known for his forceful personality. He is a member of the Japanese Baseball Hall of Fame.

Hamazaki attended Hiroshima Shogyo High School and Keio University.

Hamazaki was signed at age 45 by the Hankyu Braves in 1947 prior to the draft, having previously played for the Chinese mainland Industrial League Mantetsu Club. He began as a player-manager for the Braves.

In 1950, at age 48 years, 4 months, Hamazki became the oldest Japanese pitcher to win a professional game. That record stood until September 5, 2014, when Masahiro Yamamoto, aged 49 years, 25 days, defeated the Hanshin Tigers.

Finally retiring as a player in 1950, Hamazaki continued managing the Braves through 1953. He later managed the Takahashi/Tombo Unions and the Kokutetsu Swallows. His career managing record was 535-639, a .456 winning percentage.
