= Moriyama (surname) =

Moriyama (written: 森山 lit. "forest mountain", 盛山 or 守山) is a Japanese surname. Notable people with the surname include:

- Daidō Moriyama (森山 大道; born 1938), Japanese photographer
- Daisuke Moriyama (森山 大輔; born 1971), Japanese manga artist
- Eiji Moriyama (森山 栄治), Japanese actor and voice actor
- Hiroshi Moriyama (森山 裕; born 1945), Japanese politician
- Junko Moriyama (森山 淳子; born 1975), Japanese volleyball player
- Kaori Moriyama (森山 かおり; born 1964), Japanese judoka
- Makoto Moriyama (森山 周; born 1981), Japanese baseball player
- Masahito Moriyama (盛山 正仁; born 1953), Japanese politician
- Moriyama Einosuke (森山 栄之助; 1820–1872), Japanese samurai and interpreter
- Mayumi Moriyama (森山 眞弓; 1927–2021), Japanese politician
- Mirai Moriyama (森山 未來; born 1984), Japanese actor and dancer
- Raymond Moriyama (1929–2023), Canadian architect
- Ryoji Moriyama (森山 良二; born 1963), Japanese baseball player
- Ryoko Moriyama (森山 良子; born 1948), Japanese singer
- Shūichirō Moriyama (森山 周一郎; 1934–2021), Japanese actor and voice actor
- Takeo Moriyama (森山 威男; born 1945), Japanese jazz drummer
- Teruhisa Moriyama (森山 輝久; born 1942), Japanese volleyball player
- Tsunetaro Moriyama (守山 恒太郎; 1880–1912), Japanese baseball player
- Yasutoshi Moriyama (森山 泰年; born 1957), Japanese sport wrestler
- Yasuyuki Moriyama (森山 泰行; born 1969), Japanese footballer
- Yoshiro Moriyama (森山 佳郎; born 1967), Japanese footballer
- Yuji Moriyama (森山 雄治; born 1960), Japanese animator
