= Miyazaki Phoenix League =

Asian professional baseball league

- Sport: Baseball
- Country: Japan; South Korea
- Continent: Asia
- Website: https://npb.jp/eng/

The Miyazaki Phoenix League is a fall baseball league organized by Nippon Professional Baseball consisting of minor league affiliates of NPB teams, minor league affiliates of Korea Professional Baseball teams, and a team representing the Shikoku Island League Plus.
