= Rikuo Nemoto =

Japanese baseball player and manager (1926–1999)

Rikuo Nemoto 根本 陸夫
- Catcher / Coach / Manager
- Born: November 20, 1926; Naka District, Ibaraki, Japan
- Died: April 30, 1999 (aged 72); Japan
- Batted: Right Threw: Right

NPB debut
- 1952, for the Kintetsu Pearls

Last appearance
- 1957, for the Kintetsu Pearls

NPB statistics
- Batting average: .189
- Home runs: 2
- Hits: 70
- RBIs: 23
- Stolen bases: 4

Teams
- As player: Kintetsu Pearls (1952–1957); As manager: Hiroshima Toyo Carp (1968–1972); Crown Lighter Lions/Seibu Lions (1978–1981); Fukuoka Daiei Hawks (1993–1994); As coach: Kintetsu Pearls (1962–1966); Hiroshima Carp (1967)

Member of the Japanese

Baseball Hall of Fame
- Induction: 2001
- Election method: Selection Committee for the Players

Rikuo Nemoto (根本 陸夫, Nemoto Rikuo; November 20, 1926 – April 30, 1999) was a Japanese professional baseball catcher and manager in the Nippon Professional Baseball. For his management skills in the front office, he was elected to the Japanese Baseball Hall of Fame in 2001.
