= Moriyama Station =

Moriyama Station is the name of three train stations in Japan:

- Moriyama Station (Aichi) (守山駅)
- Moriyama Station (Nagasaki) (森山駅)
- Moriyama Station (Shiga) (守山駅)
