= Fujikura =

Electrical equipment manufacturing company

Fujikura Ltd.
- Type: Public KK
- Traded as: TYO: 5803; Nikkei 225 Component
- Industry: Electrical equipment / Defense / Telecommunications
- Founded: Tokyo, Japan (March 1910; 116 years ago)
- Founder: Zenpachi Fujikura
- Headquarters: 1-5-1, Kiba, Koto-ku, Tokyo 135-8512, Japan
- Key people: Yoichi Nagahama, (CEO and President)
- Products: Optical transmission systems; Electronic materials; Telecommunications cables; Defense technology
- Revenue: ▲JPY 740 billion (FY 2017) (US$ 6.81 billion) (FY 2017)
- Net income: ▲JPY 3.3 billion (FY 2013) (US$ 32 million) (FY 2013)
- Number of employees: 53,717 (consolidated) (as of 2021)
- Website: Official website

Fujikura Ltd. (株式会社フジクラ, Fujikura Kabushiki-gaisha) is a global, Tokyo-based electrical equipment manufacturing company, developing and manufacturing power and telecommunication systems products, including devices for optical fibers, such as cutters and splicers.

== History ==
Fujikura was founded by Zenpachi Fujikura when he began manufacturing silk and cotton insulated winding wires in 1885. In 1910 Fujikura Electric Wire Corporation was established with Tomekichi Fujikura, Zenpachi's younger brother, acting as the company's representative. Over the years the company expanded both in Japan and overseas and as of 2013 the company had subsidiaries across Europe, Asia, North and South America and North Africa.

The company is listed on the Tokyo Stock Exchange and is a constituent of the Nikkei 225 stock index.

In February 2014 the company received an order of special large core fibers from Tokyo University for the Subaru Telescope located on Mauna Kea, Hawaii.

=== Subsidiaries ===
Major affiliates include Fujikura Rubber Ltd. and Fujikura Parachute (the latter is also known as Fujikura Aviation Equipment Corporation).

== Business segments and products ==
- Power and telecommunication systems segment
  - Optical fibers and fiber cables, optical fusion splicers, network equipment, optical parts, communication and power cables, industrial, bare, aluminum and enameled wires
- Electronics segment
  - Flexible printed circuit, membrane switches, HDD parts, connectors, electron wires, sensors, electronic thermal components, wafer-level packaging
- Automotive segment
  - Wire harnesses and other electrical components for automobiles
- Real estate segment
  - Leasing of offices, provision of real estate brokerage services and professional lessons and golf school services
- Defense segment
  - Provision of products and services in this segment is primarily dealt with by Fujikura Parachute and Fujikura Rubber Ltd. This includes but is not limited to survival equipment, emergency life-saving devices such as life vests & inflatable life rafts, parachutes for emergency (e.g. bailing out of a stricken aircraft via Ejection seat or other means, insertion into remote/cut off areas by emergency personnel such as smokejumpers), airborne and sporting (including Paragliding) usage, and aircraft braking systems (e.g. for the Japan Air Self-Defense Force's F-2 fighter).

== Representative offices and production departments ==
The total number of employees worldwide is 52,409, as of mid-2013.

Together with representative offices (English: Consolidated Companies) Fujikura has:

- Head Office and 21 production and representative offices in Japan;
- 13 manufacturing and representative offices in Asia;
- 30 manufacturing and representative offices in America;
- 13 manufacturing and representative offices in China;
- 21 manufacturing and representative offices in Europe and North Africa.
