= Chujiro Endo =

Japanese baseball player

- Pitcher, first baseman, outfielder
- Born: September 20, 1917
- Died: Unknown
- Batted: Right Threw: Right

JBL debut
- 1936, for the Dai Tokyo

Last appearance
- 1939, for the Tokyo Senators

Teams
- Dai Tokyo (1936–1937); Nagoya Baseball Club (1937); Tokyo Senators (1938–1939)

Chujiro Endo (遠藤 忠二郎, Endō Chūjirō; born September 20, 1917, date of death unknown) was a professional baseball player. He played pitcher, first base and outfield for the Dai Tokyo, Nagoya Baseball Club, and Tokyo Senators baseball teams from 1936 to 1939. He attended Waseda University.

He died in combat during military service in World War II, place and date of death unknown.
