= Baseball in Japan =

Baseball in Japan (野球)
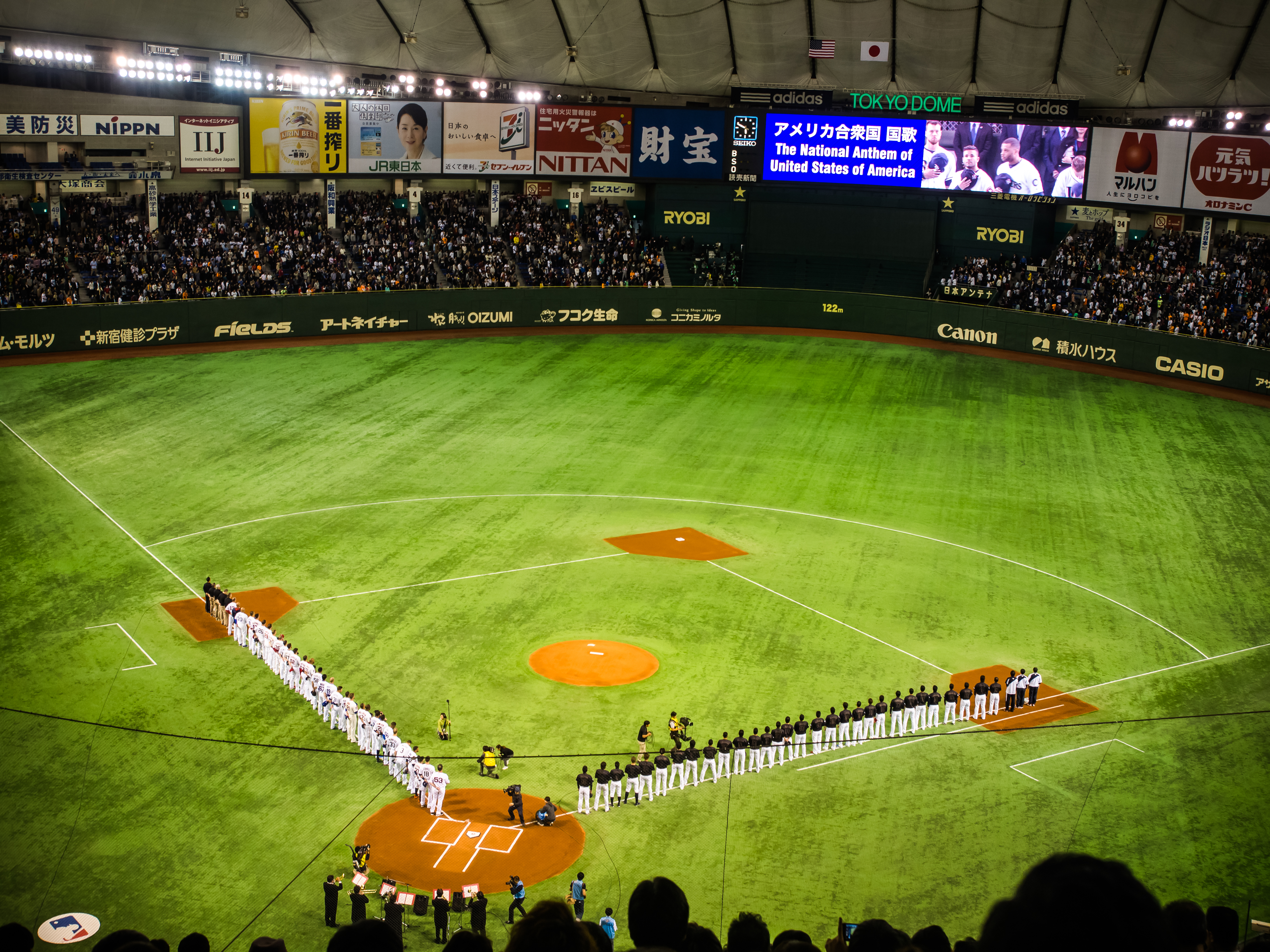
- Tokyo Dome during the 2014 MLB Japan All-Star Series
- Country: Japan
- Governing body: BFJ
- National team: Japan
- First played: 1872

National competitions
- Japan Series

Club competitions
- Nippon Professional Baseball; Central League; Pacific League; Eastern League; Western League; Miyazaki Phoenix League; Shikoku Island League Plus; Baseball Challenge League

International competitions
- WBSC Premier12; World Baseball Classic; Summer Olympics (1992–2008, 2020); Asian Championship; Asian Games

Baseball was introduced to Japan in 1872 and is Japan's most popular sport. Seven million Japanese people play baseball, approximately 5% of the total population.

The first professional competitions emerged in the 1920s. The highest level of baseball in Japan is Nippon Professional Baseball (NPB), which consists of two leagues, the Central League and the Pacific League, with six teams in each league. High school baseball has a particularly strong public profile and fan base, much like college football and college basketball in the United States; the Japanese High School Baseball Championship ("Summer Kōshien"), which takes place each August, is nationally televised and includes regional champions from each of Japan's 47 prefectures.

In Japanese, baseball is commonly called yakyū (野球), combining the characters for field and ball. According to the Japan National Tourism Organization (JNTO), the atmosphere of Japanese baseball games is less relaxed than in the United States, with fans regularly singing and dancing to team songs.

Game night at Yokohama Stadium, 2023

In Japan, Nippon Professional Baseball players such as Shohei Ohtani, Ichiro Suzuki, Hideki Matsui, Shigeo Nagashima and Sadaharu Oh are regarded as national stars, and their exceptional performances have boosted baseball's popularity in Japan. All of them received or were approached for the People's Honour Award (国民栄誉賞, Kokumin Eiyoshō) for their achievements and popularity.

== History ==
Baseball was introduced into Japan in 1859 after the opening of the treaty ports, having been played alongside cricket by American and British expatriates in the foreign settlements until the 20th century. It was introduced as a school sport in 1872 by American Horace Wilson, an English professor at the Kaisei Academy in Tokyo. The first organized adult baseball team, the Shimbashi Athletic Club, was established in 1878.

The Japanese government appointed American oyatoi in order to start a state-inspired modernization process. This involved the education ministry, which made baseball accessible to children by integrating the sport into the physical education curriculum. Japanese students, who returned from studying in the United States captivated by the sport, took government positions. Clubs and private teams such as the Shinbashi Athletic Club, along with high school and college teams, commenced the baseball infrastructure.

At a match played in Yokohama in 1896, a team from Tokyo's Ichikō high school convincingly defeated a team of resident foreigners from the Yokohama Country & Athletic Club. The contemporary Japanese language press lauded the team as national heroes and news of this match greatly contributed to the popularity of baseball as a school sport. Tsuneo Matsudaira in his "Sports and Physical Training in Modern Japan" address to the Japan Society of the UK in London in 1907 related that after the victory, "the game spread, like a fire in a dry field, in summer, all over the country, and some months afterwards, even in children in primary schools in the country far away from Tōkyō were to be seen playing with bats and balls".

== Professional baseball ==
Professional baseball in Japan started in the 1920s, but it was not until the Greater Japan Tokyo Baseball Club (大日本東京野球クラブ, Dai-nippon Tōkyō Yakyū Kurabu), a team of all-stars established in 1934 by media mogul Matsutarō Shōriki, that the modern professional game found continued success—especially after Shōriki's club matched up against an American All-Star team that included Babe Ruth, Jimmie Foxx, Lou Gehrig, and Charlie Gehringer. While prior Japanese all-star contingents had disbanded, Shōriki went pro with this group, playing in an independent league.

The first Japanese professional league was formed in 1936, and by 1950 had grown big enough to divide into two leagues, the Central League and the Pacific League, together known as Nippon Professional Baseball (NPB). It is called Puro Yakyū (プロ野球), meaning professional baseball. The pro baseball season is eight months long, with games beginning in April. Teams play 144 games (as compared to the 162 games of the American major league teams), followed by a playoff system, culminating in a championship held in October, known as the Japan Series.

Corporations with interests outside baseball own most of the teams. Historically, teams have been identified with their owners, not where the team is based. However, in recent years, many owners have chosen to include a place name in the names of their teams; the majority of the 12 NPB teams are currently named with both corporate and geographical place names.

=== Minor leagues ===
Much like Minor League Baseball in the United States, Japan has a farm system through two minor leagues, each affiliated with Nippon Professional Baseball. The Eastern League consists of seven teams and is owned by the Central League. The Western League consists of five teams and is owned by the Pacific League. Both minor leagues play 80-game seasons.

=== Differences from Major League Baseball ===
The rules are essentially those of Major League Baseball (MLB), but technical elements are slightly different: The Nippon league uses a smaller baseball, strike zone, and playing field. Five Nippon league teams have fields whose small dimensions would violate the American Official Baseball Rules.

Also unlike MLB, game length is limited and tie games are allowed. In the regular season, the limit is twelve innings, while in the playoffs, there is a fifteen-inning limit (games in Major League Baseball, by comparison, continue until there is a winner). Due to power limits imposed because of the 2011 Tōhoku earthquake and tsunami, the 2011 NPB regular season further limited game length by adding a restriction that no inning could begin more than three hours and thirty minutes after the first pitch.

NPB teams have active rosters of 28 players, as opposed to 26 in MLB (27 on days of doubleheaders). However, the game roster has a 25-player limit. Before each game, NPB teams must designate three players from the active roster who will not appear in that contest. A team cannot have more than four foreign players on a 25-man game roster, although there is no limit on the number of foreign players that it may sign. If there are four, they cannot all be pitchers nor all be position players. This limits the cost and competition for expensive players of other nationalities and is similar to rules in many European sports leagues' roster limits on non-European players.

In each of the two Nippon Professional Baseball leagues, teams with the best winning percentage go on to a stepladder-format playoff (3 vs. 2, winner vs. 1). Occasionally, a team with more total wins has been seeded below a team that had more ties and fewer losses and, therefore, had a better winning percentage. The winners of each league compete in the Japan Series.

=== Strike of 2004 ===
On 18 September 2004, professional baseball players went on a two-day strike, the first strike in the history of the league, to protest the proposed merger between the Orix BlueWave and the Osaka Kintetsu Buffaloes and the failure of the owners to agree to create a new team to fill the void resulting from the merger. The strike was settled on 23 September 2004, when the owners agreed to grant a new franchise in the Pacific League and to continue the two-league, 12-team system. The new team, the Tohoku Rakuten Golden Eagles, began play in the 2005 season.

== High school baseball ==
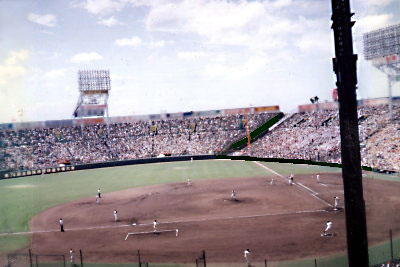
Hanshin Kōshien Stadium during the 1992 Kōshien tournament

In Japan, high school baseball (高校野球, kōkō yakyū) generally refers to the two annual baseball tournaments played by high schools nationwide culminating in a final showdown at Hanshin Kōshien Stadium in Nishinomiya. They are organized by the Japan High School Baseball Federation in association with Mainichi Shimbun for the National High School Baseball Invitational Tournament in the spring (also known as "Spring Kōshien") and Asahi Shimbun for the National High School Baseball Championship in the summer (also known as "Summer Kōshien").

These nationwide tournaments enjoy widespread popularity, arguably equal to or greater than professional baseball. Qualifying tournaments are often televised locally and each game of the final stage at Kōshien is televised nationally on NHK. The tournaments have become a national tradition, and large numbers of students and parents travel from hometowns to cheer for their local team. The popularity of these tournaments has been compared to the popularity of March Madness in the United States.

== Industrial baseball ==
Companies field teams made up of employees known in Japanese as Shakai-Jin Yakyū (社会人野球, Shakaijinyakyuu). In English they are known as the industrial leagues or corporate leagues. Most of Japan's major corporations including Toyota, Yamaha, ENEOS, Nippon Life, and Honda field teams. Players on these teams work full-time and receive salaries as company employees, not as baseball players. However in recent years, JABA has allowed corporate teams to have players that can be hired and paid full-time to just play baseball, thus making it more semi-professional than amateur.

Teams in this circuit play tournaments, the most prestigious being the Intercity Baseball Tournament which began in 1927 and predates NPB. The other major tournament they compete in is the Japan Amateur Baseball Championship.

The level of play in industrial baseball is very high; industrial league players are drafted to NPB every year and selected to represent Japan in international tournaments when NPB players are not available to play. Japan's teams at the Asian Games consist purely of industrial players. Major League Baseball players such as Hideo Nomo (Shin-Nitetsu Sakai), Junichi Tazawa (Nippon Oil) and Kosuke Fukudome (Nihon Seimei), began their playing careers in this field.

Like amateur club teams, industrial ball is governed by the Japan Amateur Baseball Association (JABA).

== International play ==
Japan has won the World Baseball Classic three times since the tournament was created. In the 2006 World Baseball Classic, they defeated Cuba in the finals and in the 2009 World Baseball Classic, Japan defeated its arch-rival of South Korea in 10 innings to defend their title. In the 2023 World Baseball Classic, they reclaimed their title by defeating the United States 3–2 in the Championship game. The national team is consistently ranked one of the best in the world by the World Baseball Softball Confederation.

== Attendances ==
In the 2025 league season, 12 Japanese baseball clubs recorded an average home league attendance of at least 20,000:

#	Club	Average
1	Hanshin Tigers	41,722
2	Yomiuri Giants	39,761
3	Fukuoka SoftBank Hawks	38,281
4	Chunichi Dragons	35,012
5	Yokohama DeNA BayStars	33,245
6	Hokkaido Nippon‑Ham Fighters	31,442
7	ORIX Buffaloes	28,571
8	Hiroshima Toyo Carp	28,356
9	Tokyo Yakult Swallows	27,944
10	Chiba Lotte Marines	26,018
11	Saitama Seibu Lions	24,395
12	Tohoku Rakuten Golden Eagles	23,713

== See also ==
- Asahi (baseball team)
- Baseball awards#Japan
- Japan national baseball team
- List of Japanese baseball players
- Mr. Baseball, 1992 film
- Sport in Japan
