= Intercity Baseball Tournament =

Intercity Baseball Tournament 都市対抗野球大会
- The Black Lion Flag, one of the tournament trophies and symbol of the tournament
- Sport: Baseball
- Founded: 1927
- Organising body: JABA; Mainichi Shimbun
- No. of teams: 32
- Country: Japan
- Venue: Tokyo Dome
- Most recent champion: Yokohama (Mitsubishi Heavy Industries East)
- Most titles: Team: ENEOS (12); City: Tokyo (14)
- Broadcasters: NHK, J Sports
- Streaming partners: Mainichi website JABAstation
- Sponsors: Mainichi Shimbun; MIC
- Related competitions: The Industrial National Championship Tournament
- Website: JABA website Mainichi website

The Intercity Baseball Tournament (都市対抗野球大会 Toshi Taikō yakyū taikai) of Japan, commonly known as "Summer All-star or Mid-Summer Classic" (真夏の球宴 manatsu no kyūen), is an annual nationwide industrial baseball tournament in Japan, organized by JABA and Mainichi Shimbun and sponsored by the Japanese Ministry of Internal Affairs and Communications (MIC) by the grounds that "regional development is promoted through tournaments between teams that represent their cities."

The most prestigious tournament in corporate baseball, it was first held in 1927 and predates Nippon Professional Baseball. Players wear the emblem of the town they represent on the right shoulder of their jerseys.

The winners are awarded the "Black Lion Flag" (黒獅子旗 kurojishi ki), runners-up are awarded the "White Lion Flag" (白獅子旗 shirojishi ki).

== Winners ==
A bracket after city and team in champion column indicates number of titles.

(baseball team) links to Japanese Wikipedia article except club team and team does not have an article.

Ed	Year	Champion	Score	Runner-up
1	1927	Dalian, Manchuria Club	3-0	Osaka, All Osaka
2	1928	Dalian (2), Dalian works team	1-0	Tokyo City, Tokyo Club
3	1929	Dalian (3), Manchuria Club (2)	5-0	Nagoya, Nagoya Railway Bureau (baseball team)
4	1930	Tokyo City, Tokyo Club	10-5	Nagoya, Nagoya Railway Bureau
5	1931	Tokyo City (2), Tokyo Club (2)	12-6	Yokohama, All Yokohama
6	1932	Kobe, All Kobe	1-0	Dalian, Manchuria Club
7	1933	Tokyo City (3), Tokyo Club (3)	6x-5	Keijō, All Keijō
8	1934	Osaka, All Osaka	7x-6	Yahata, Yawata Steel (baseball team)
9	1935	Tokyo City (4), Tokyo Club (4)	3-0	Kawasaki, Columbia (baseball team)
10	1936	Moji, Moji Railway Bureau (baseball team)	5-1	Dalian, Manchuria Club
11	1937	Yahata, Yawata Steel	3-1	Tokyo City, Tokyo Club
12	1938	Tokyo City (5), Fujikura Electric Wire Corporation (baseball team)	4-1	Keijō, All Keijō
13	1939	Tokyo City (6), Fujikura Electric Wire Corporation (2)	3-0	Shōnai, Shōnai Tamurakoma (baseball team)
14	1940	Keijō, All Keijō	4-0	Dalian, Dalian works team
15	1941	Tournament cancelled due to war escalation (Note: Teams supposed to play were Hakodate, Hakodate Ocean Club; Sendai, Sendai Railway Bureau (baseball team); Ōta, Ōta Yuhi (full name is Ōta Yuhi Club); Tokyo City, Fujikura Electric Wire Corporation; Yokohama, All Furukawa; Niigata, 日東紡; Nagoya, Toho Gas (baseball team); Osaka, Nakayama Steel Works (baseball team, under team name 中山製鋼 in this tournament); Himeji, Japan Iron & Steel Co., Ltd. Hirohata (baseball team); Kobe, Kobe Customs; Kure, Kure Construction; Yahata, Yawata Steel; Tainan, Tainan Prefecture Team; Keijō, All Keijō; Dalian, Dalian works team; Xinjing; Manchuria Telegraph and Telephone (under team name 新京電電); Shanghai, 上海華中鉄道. Among those teams, All Furukawa, Kure Construction and 上海華中鉄道 have never appeared after this tournament.)		
16	1942	Keijō (2), All Keijō (2) (Note: This title is not considered as two consecutive titles.)	12-6	Osaka, Daido Steel Co., Ltd. (Note: Appeared as 大同製鋼.)
Tournament cancelled due to war escalation (1943–45)
17	1946	Gifu, Dai Nippon Construction (baseball team)	3-0	Kiryū, All Kiryū
18	1947	Gifu (2), Dai Nippon Construction (2)	8-2	Takasago, Kanebo Takasago (baseball team)
19	1948	Fukuoka, Nishi-Nippon Railroad (baseball team)	8-1	Beppu, Hoshinogumi (baseball team)
20	1949	Osaka (2), All Kanebo (baseball team)	6-1	Tokyo, Kumagai Gumi (baseball team)
21	1950	Beppu, Hoshinogumi	8-2	Yoshiwara, Daishowa Paper (baseball team)
22	1951	Osaka (3), All Kanebo (2)	3-2	Osaka, Nankai-doken (baseball team (Note: This team was virtually the farm team of Nankai Hawks.))
23	1952	Osaka (4), All Kanebo (3) (Note: In previous tournament, it qualified automatically as a defending champion but broke the rule by using players from losing teams in Osaka qualification. Therefore it declined the automatic qualification and entered Osaka qualification. It won the qualification and used players from Nippon Life.)	11-5	Futase, Nittetsu Futase
24	1953	Yoshiwara, Daishowa Paper	3-0	Osaka, All Kanebo
25	1954	Yahata (2), Yawata Steel (2)	5-2	Tokyo, All Fujikura
26	1955	Osaka (5), All Kanebo (4)	5-1	Osaka, Kanegafuchi Chemical
27	1956	Yokohama, Nippon Oil Co., Ltd. (baseball team)	3-2	Tokyo, Kumagai Gumi
28	1957	Tokyo (7), Kumagai Gumi	4-0	Urawa, Nippon Express (baseball team)
29	1958	Yokohama (2), Nippon Oil Co., Ltd. (2)	4-0	Futase, Nittetsu Futase
30	1959	Matsuyama, Maruzen Petroleum (baseball team)	6-4	Kamaishi, Fuji Steel Kamaishi (baseball team)
31	1960	Tokyo (8), Kumagai Gumi (2)	3x-2 (10 innings)	Kadoma Town, Matsushita Electric Industrial Co., Ltd. (baseball team (Note: Appeared as 松下電器.))
32	1961	Yokohama (3), Nippon Oil Co., Ltd. (3)	4-2 (12 innings)	Nagoya, Shin-Mitsubishi Jukogyo Nagoya (baseball team (Note: Appeared as 新三菱重工名古屋.))
33	1962	Yokohama (4), Nippon Oil Co., Ltd. (4)	12-0	Nagoya, Nippon Express Nagoya (baseball team)
34	1963	Kyoto, Sekisui Chemical	4-3	Muroran, Fuji Steel Muroran (baseball team)
35	1964	Urawa, Nippon Express	2-0	Kawasaki, Nippon Columbia
36	1965	Osaka (6), Denden Kinki (baseball team)	4-0	Wakayama, Sumitomo Metal Industries (baseball team (Note: Appeared as 住友金属.))
37	1966	Tokyo (9), Kumagai Gumi (3)	4x-3 (10 innings)	Wakayama, Sumitomo Metal Industries
38	1967	Yokohama (5), Nippon Oil Co., Ltd. (5)	4-2 (12 innings)	Hamamatsu, Nippon Gakki Co. Ltd. (baseball team)
39	1968	Himeji, Nippon Steel Hirohata (baseball team (Note: Appeared as 新日本製鐵広畑.))	1-0	Hamamatsu, Kawai Musical Instruments (baseball team)
40	1969	Chiba, Denden Kantō (baseball team)	2x-1	Ōta, Fuji Heavy Industries, Ltd. (baseball team)
41	1970	Fuji, Daishowa Paper (2)	1-1 (tied after 14 innings); 3-0	Kobe, Mitsubishi Heavy Industries Kobe (baseball team (Note: Appeared as 三菱重工神戸.))
42	1971	Himeji (2), Nippon Steel Hirohata (2)	6-2	Matsuyama, Maruzen Petroleum
43	1972	Hamamatsu, Nippon Gakki Co. Ltd.	4-0	Kawasaki, Mitsubishi Motors Kawasaki (baseball team)
44	1973	Kawasaki, Nippon Kokan (baseball team)	11-2	Yokosuka, Nissan Motors (baseball team)
45	1974	Shiraoi, Daishowa Paper Hokkaido (baseball team)	4-0 (10 innings)	Kitakyushu, Nippon Steel Yawata (Note: Appeared as 新日本製鐵八幡.)
46	1975	Chiba (2), Denden Kantō (2)	3-0	Shiraoi, Daishowa Paper Hokkaido
47	1976	Kawasaki (2), Nippon Kokan (2)	1-0	Sapporo, Hokkaido Takushoku Bank (baseball team)
48	1977	Kobe (2), Kobe Steel (baseball team (Note: Appeared as 神戸製鋼.))	3-0	Tokyo, Kumagai Gumi
49	1978	Kawasaki (3), Toshiba (baseball team)	4-0	Kawasaki, Nippon Kokan
50	1979	Hiroshima, Mitsubishi Heavy Industries Hiroshima (baseball team (Note: Appeared as 三菱重工広島.))	6-4	Tokyo, Kumagai Gumi
51	1980	Fuji (3), Daishowa Paper (3)	8-3	Sapporo, Sapporo Toyopet (baseball team)
52	1981	Tokyo (10), Denden Tokyo (baseball team)	3-2	Kawasaki, Toshiba
53	1982	Wakayama, Sumitomo Metal Industries	5-4	Fukuyama, Nippon Kokan Fukuyama (baseball team)
54	1983	Kawasaki (4), Toshiba (2)	8-3	Nagoya, Nippon Steel Nagoya (baseball team (Note: Appeared as 新日本製鐵名古屋.))
55	1984	Yokosuka, Nissan Motors	10-9	Kawasaki, Nippon Kokan
56	1985	Osaka (7), Nippon Life (baseball team)	4-3	Kawasaki, Toshiba
57	1986	Yokohama (6), Nippon Oil Co., Ltd. (6)	9-7	Kanazawa, NTT Hokuriku (baseball team)
58	1987	Hamamatsu (2), Yamaha Corporation (2)	4-3	Kawasaki, Toshiba
59	1988	Kawasaki (5), Toshiba (3)	3x-2	Nagoya, NTT Tōkai (baseball team)
60	1989	Tokyo (11), Prince Hotels (baseball team (Note: Appeared as プリンスホテル.))	8-3	Shiraoi, Daishowa Paper Hokkaido
61	1990	Hamamatsu (3), Yamaha Corporation (3)	12-11	Himeji, Nippon Steel Hirohata
62	1991	Kawasaki (6), Toshiba (4)	16-6	Nagasaki, Mitsubishi Heavy Industries Nagasaki (baseball team (Note: Appeared as 三菱重工長崎.))
63	1992	Osaka (8), Nippon Life (2)	4-2	Tokyo, Kumagai Gumi
64	1993	Yokohama (7), Nippon Oil Co., Ltd. (7)	7-5	Urawa, Nippon Express
65	1994	Suzuka, Honda Motor Co., Ltd. Suzuka (baseball team (Note: Appeared as 本田技研鈴鹿.))	5-3	Ōgaki, Seino Transportation (baseball team)
66	1995	Yokohama (8), Nippon Oil Co., Ltd. (8)	8x-7 (10 innings)	Fukuyama, NKK
67	1996	Wakō, Honda Motor Co., Ltd. (baseball team (Note: Appeared as 本田技研.))	8-7	Hiroshima, Mitsubishi Heavy Industries Hiroshima
68	1997	Osaka (9), Nippon Life (3)	5-3	Urawa, Nippon Express
69	1998	Yokosuka (2), Nissan Motors (2)	11-3	Chiba, Kawasaki Steel Chiba (baseball team)
70	1999	Kawasaki (7), Toshiba (5)	12-0	Nagasaki, Mitsubishi Heavy Industries Nagasaki
71	2000	Kawasaki (8), Mitsubishi Motors Kawasaki	9-3	Osaka, Osaka Gas (baseball team)
72	2001	Hamamatsu (4), Kawai Musical Instruments	6-3	Okazaki, Mitsubishi Motors Okazaki (baseball team)
73	2002	Fujisawa, Isuzu Motors Ltd (baseball team)	2-0	Ōzu, Honda Kumamoto (baseball team (Note: Appeared as ホンダ熊本.))
74	2003	Kawasaki (9), Mitsubishi Fuso Kawasaki (2)	5-4	Chōfu, Shidax (baseball team)
75	2004	Kasugai, Oji Paper Company (baseball team)	6x-5 (10 innings)	Sayama, Honda (baseball team (Note: Appeared as ホンダ.))
76	2005	Kawasaki (10), Mitsubishi Fuso Kawasaki (3)	6-3	Yokosuka, Nissan Motors
77	2006	Nikaho, TDK (baseball team)	4-3	Yokosuka, Nissan Motors
78	2007	Kawasaki (11), Toshiba (6)	7-5	Tokyo, JR East Japan (baseball team)
79	2008	Yokohama (9), Nippon Oil Corporation ENEOS (Note: Appeared as 新日本石油ENEOS.) (9)	4-1	Kasugai, Oji Paper Company
80	2009	Sayama, Honda (2) (Note: Appeared as Honda.)	4-2	Toyota, Toyota Motor Corporation (baseball team)
81	2010	Kawasaki (12), Toshiba (7)	2-0	Kitakyushu, JR Kyushu
82	2011	Tokyo (12), JR East Japan	2x-1 (11 innings)	Tokyo, NTT East Japan
83	2012	Yokohama (10), JX-ENEOS (10)	6-3	Tokyo, JR East Japan
84	2013	Yokohama (11), JX-ENEOS (11)	3-1	Tokyo, JR East Japan
85	2014	Ōgaki, Seino Transportation	2-0	Ōta, Fuji Heavy Industries, Ltd.
86	2015	Osaka (10), Nippon Life (4)	5-3 (14 innings)	Osaka, Osaka Gas
87	2016	Toyota, Toyota Motor Corporation	4-0	Hitachi, Hitachi (baseball team)
88	2017	Tokyo (13), NTT East Japan (2)	10-4	Saitama, Nippon Express
89	2018	Osaka (11), Osaka Gas	2-0	Kobe/Takasago, Mitsubishi Heavy Industries Kobe・Takasago (Note: Appeared as 三菱重工神戸・高砂.)
90	2019	Chiba (3), JFE East Japan	6-4	Toyota, Toyota Motor Corporation
91	2020	Sayama (2), Honda (3)	4-1	Tokyo, NTT East
92	2021	Tokyo (14), Tokyo Gas (baseball team)	6-5	Ōzu, Honda Kumamoto (Note: Appeared as Honda熊本.)
93	2022	Yokohama (12), ENEOS (12)	5-4	Tokyo, Tokyo Gas
94	2023	Toyota (2), Toyota Motor Corporation (2)	4-2	Hamamatsu, Yamaha Corporation
95	2024	Yokohama, Mitsubishi Heavy Industries East	3-1	Sendai City, JR East Tohoku
96	2025	Kasugai, Oji Paper	2-1	Okazaki, Mitsubishi Motors Okazaki
