= 1996 MLB Japan All-Star Series =

The 1996 MLB Japan All-Star Series was the fifth edition of the championship, a best-of-eight series between the All-Star teams from Major League Baseball (MLB) and Nippon Professional Baseball (NPB), then-called All-Japan.

MLB won the series by 4–2–2 and Steve Finley was named MVP.

== Results ==
Championship

Game	Winning team	Score	Losing team	Location
1	All-Japan	06-05	MLB All-Stars	Tokyo Dome
2	MLB All-Stars	06-01	All-Japan	Tokyo Dome
3	MLB All-Stars	04-02	All-Japan	Tokyo Dome
4	MLB All-Stars	02-01	All-Japan	Seibu Lions Stadium
5	Tie	06-06	Tie	Tokyo Dome
6	MLB All-Stars	11-08	All-Japan	Koshien Stadium
7	All-Japan	06-04	MLB All-Stars	Yokohama Stadium
8	Tie	08-08	Tie	Tokyo Dome

== Rosters ==
=== MLB All-Stars roster ===
Pitchers

- 41 (United States) Pat Hentgen - (Toronto Blue Jays)
- 45 (Dominican Republic) Pedro Martínez - (Montreal Expos)
- 15 (United States) Denny Neagle - (Atlanta Braves)
- 16 (Japan) Hideo Nomo - (Los Angeles Dodgers)
- 37 (United States) Shane Reynolds - (Houston Astros)
- 45 (United States) Jeff Brantley - (Cincinnati Reds)
- 31 (United States) John Franco - (New York Mets)
- 49 (Dominican Republic) José Mesa - (Cleveland Indians)
- 40 (United States) Troy Percival - (California Angels)

Catchers

- 31 (United States) Mike Piazza - (Los Angeles Dodgers)
- 07 (Puerto Rico) Iván Rodríguez - (Texas Rangers)
- 19 (United States) Tom Pagnozzi - (St. Louis Cardinals)

Infielders

- 14 (Venezuela) Andres Galarraga - (Colorado Rockies)
- 20 (Dominican Republic) Julio Franco - (Cleveland Indians)
- 11 (United States) Chuck Knoblauch - (Minnesota Twins)
- 21 (United States) Eric Young - (Colorado Rockies)
- 03 (United States) Alex Rodriguez - (Seattle Mariners)
- 08 (United States) Cal Ripken Jr. - (Baltimore Orioles)
- 23 (United States) Robin Ventura - (Chicago White Sox)
- 26 (United States) Jeff Cirillo - (Milwaukee Brewers)

Oufielders

- 25 (United States) Barry Bonds - (San Francisco Giants)
- 09 (United States) Brady Anderson - (Baltimore Orioles)
- 10 (United States) Gary Sheffield - (Florida Marlins)
- 19 (Puerto Rico) Juan González - (Texas Rangers)
- 09 (United States) Marquis Grissom - (Atlanta Braves)
- 12 (United States) Steve Finley - (San Diego Padres)

Coaching Staff

- 12 (United States) Dusty Baker - (San Francisco Giants)
- 18 (United States) Art Howe - (Oakland Athletics)
- 42 (United States) Dick Such - (Minnesota Twins)
- 25 (United States) Don Baylor - (Colorado Rockies)

=== NPB All-Stars (All-Japan) roster ===
Pitchers

- 13 (Japan) Fumiya Nishiguchi - (Seibu Lions)
- 19 (Japan) Masao Kida - (Yomiuri Giants)
- 41 (Japan) Tetsuro Kawajiri - (Hanshin Tigers)
- 11 (Japan) Masaki Saito - (Yomiuri Giants)
- 18 (Japan) Shinji Sasaoka - (Hiroshima Toyo Carp)
- 19 (Japan) Motoyuki Akahori - (Kintetsu Buffaloes)
- 28 (Japan) Nobuyuki Hoshino - (Orix BlueWave)
- 27 (Japan) Yasuyuki Kawamoto - (Chiba Lotte Marines)
- 22 (Japan) Kazuhiro Sasaki - (Yokohama BayStars)
- 47 (Japan) Shigeki Noguchi - (Chunichi Dragons)
- 14 (Japan) Satoru Komiyama - (Chiba Lotte Marines)
- 21 (Japan) Hiroki Nomura - (Yokohama BayStars)
- 20 (Japan) Keiji Kimura - (Fukuoka Daiei Hawks)
- 22 (Japan) Shingo Takatsu - (Yakult Swallows)
- 39 (Japan) Kazuya Tabata - (Yakult Swallows)
- 14 (Japan) Shigeki Sano - (Kintetsu Buffaloes)
- 15 (Japan) Masao Fujii - (Fukuoka Daiei Hawks)
- 12 (Japan) Iori Sekiguchi - (Yokohama BayStars)

Catchers

- 27 (Japan) Atsuya Furuta - (Yakult Swallows)
- 27 (Japan) Tsutomu Ito - (Seibu Lions)
- 8 (Japan) Motonobu Tanishige - (Yokohama BayStars)
- 32 (Japan) Shuji Nishiyama - (Hiroshima Toyo Carp)

Infielders

- 3 (Japan) Kazuhiro Kiyohara - (Seibu Lions)
- 32 (Japan) Kazuo Matsui - (Seibu Lions)
- 22 (Japan) Takeshi Yamasaki - (Chunichi Dragons)
- 6 (Japan) Yutaka Wada - (Hanshin Tigers)
- 3 (Japan) Kazuyoshi Tatsunami - (Chunichi Dragons)
- 55 (Japan) Yasuaki Taiho - (Chunichi Dragons)
- 8 (Japan) Atsushi Kataoka - (Nippon-Ham Fighters)
- 5 (Japan) Takuro Ishii - (Yokohama BayStars)
- 9 (Japan) Hiroki Kokubo - (Fukuoka Daiei Hawks)
- 6 (Japan) Yukio Tanaka - (Nippon-Ham Fighters)
- 10 (Japan) Norihiro Komada - (Yokohama BayStars)
- 8 (Japan) Chihiro Hamana - (Fukuoka Daiei Hawks)
- 8 (Japan) Toshihisa Nishi - (Yomiuri Giants)
- 55 (Japan) Noriyoshi Omichi - (Fukuoka Daiei Hawks)
- 0 (Japan) Masahiro Kawai - (Yomiuri Giants)
- 5 (Japan) Katsuyuki Dobashi - (Yakult Swallows)

Oufielders

- 55 (Japan) Hideki Matsui - (Yomiuri Giants)
- 51 (Japan) Ichiro Suzuki - (Orix BlueWave)
- 9 (Japan) Koichi Ogata - (Hiroshima Toyo Carp)
- 23 (Japan) Arihito Muramatsu - (Fukuoka Daiei Hawks)
- 24 (Japan) Shinjiro Hiyama - (Hanshin Tigers)
- 35 (Japan) Takayuki Shimizu - (Yomiuri Giants)
- 51 (Japan) Takanori Suzuki - (Yokohama BayStars)

Coaching Staff
