= 1988 MLB Japan All-Star Series =

The 1988 MLB Japan All-Star Series was the second edition of the championship, a best-of-seven series between the All-Star teams from Major League Baseball (MLB) and Nippon Professional Baseball (NPB), then-called All-Japan.

MLB won the series by 3–2–2 and Barry Larkin was named MVP.

== Results ==
Championship

| Game | Winning team | Score | Losing team | Location |
|---|---|---|---|---|
| 1 | All-Japan | 02-01 | MLB All-Stars | Tokyo Dome |
| 2 | Tie | 06-06 | Tie | Tokyo Dome |
| 3 | MLB All-Stars | 16-08 | All-Japan | Heiwadai Stadium |
| 4 | MLB All-Stars | 08-02 | All-Japan | Koshien Stadium |
| 5 | MLB All-Stars | 03-01 | All-Japan | Seibu Lions Stadium |
| 6 | All-Japan | 05-04 | MLB All-Stars | Tokyo Dome |
| 7 | Tie | 00-00 | Tie | Tokyo Dome |

== Rosters ==
=== MLB All-Stars roster ===
Pitchers

- 44 (United States) David Cone - (New York Mets)
- 23 (United States) Mark Gubicza - (Kansas City Royals)
- 55 (United States) Orel Hershiser - (Los Angeles Dodgers)
- 20 (United States) Danny Jackson - (Cincinnati Reds)
- 22 (United States) Jimmy Key - (Toronto Blue Jays)
- 31 (United States) Greg Maddux - (Chicago Cubs)
- 48 (United States) Mark Davis - (San Diego Padres)
- 11 (United States) Doug Jones - (Cleveland Indians)
- 40 (United States) Jeff Russell - (Texas Rangers)

Catchers

- 15 (United States) Tim Laudner - (Minnesota Twins)
- 09 (Puerto Rico) Benito Santiago - (San Diego Padres)
- 36 (United States) Terry Steinbach - (Oakland Athletics)

Infielders

- 14 (Venezuela) Andres Galarraga - (Montreal Expos)
- 19 (United States) Fred McGriff - (Toronto Blue Jays)
- 19 (United States) Harold Reynolds - (Seattle Mariners)
- 11 (United States) Barry Larkin - (Cincinnati Reds)
- 03 (United States) Alan Trammell - (Detroit Tigers)
- 25 (United States) Bobby Bonilla - (Pittsburgh Pirates)
- 02 (United States) Vance Law - (Montreal Expos)
- 04 (United States) Paul Molitor - (Milwaukee Brewers)

Oufielders

- 12 (United States) Ellis Burks - (Boston Red Sox)
- 29 (United States) Vince Coleman - (St. Louis Cardinals)
- 42 (United States) Dave Henderson - (Oakland Athletics)
- 51 (United States) Willie McGee - (St. Louis Cardinals)
- 25 (Cuba) Rafael Palmeiro - (Chicago Cubs)
- 34 (United States) Kirby Puckett - (Minnesota Twins)

Coaching Staff

- 11 (United States) Sparky Anderson - (Detroit Tigers)
- 38 (United States) Roger Craig - (San Francisco Giants)
- 51 (United States) Alex Grammas - (Detroit Tigers)

=== NPB All-Stars (All-Japan) roster ===
Pitchers

- 17 (Japan) Hiromi Makihara (Yomiuri Giants)
- 18 (Japan) Masumi Kuwata (Yomiuri Giants)
- 41 (Japan) Hisanobu Watanabe (Seibu Lions)
- 21 (Japan) Yukihiro Nishizaki (Hokkaido Nippon-Ham Fighters)
- 19 (Japan) Kiyooki Nakanishi (Hanshin Tigers)
- 00 (Japan) Hiroaki Matsuura (Hokkaido Nippon-Ham Fighters)
- 26 (Japan) Hiroshi Ogawa (Seibu Lions)
- 18 (Japan) Akimitsu Itoh (Tokyo Yakult Swallows)
- 32 (Japan) Takao Obana (Tokyo Yakult Swallows)
- 17 (Japan) Hiroaki Nakayama (Yokohama Taiyo Whales)
- 19 (Japan) Takanori Yamauchi (Fukuoka Nankai Hawks)
- 34 (Japan) Kazuhisa Kawaguchi (Hiroshima Toyo Carp)
- 47 (Japan) Kimiyasu Kudō (Seibu Lions)
- 21 (Japan) Yoshiaki Nishikawa (Fukuoka Nankai Hawks)
- 14 (Japan) Hideyuki Awano (Osaka Kintetsu Buffaloes)
- 36 (Japan) Masato Yoshii (Osaka Kintetsu Buffaloes)
- 14 (Japan) Tsunemi Tsuda (Hiroshima Toyo Carp)
- 34 (Japan) Nobuyuki Hoshino (Hanshin Tigers)
- 17 (Japan) Kazuhiko Ushijima (Chunichi Dragons)
- 13 (Japan) Kazuyuki Ono (Seibu Lions)
- 26 (Japan) Kazuyoshi Ono (Osaka Kintetsu Buffaloes)
- 20 (Japan) Manabu Kitabeppu (Hiroshima Toyo Carp)
- 33 (Taiwan) Genji Kaku (Chunichi Dragons)
- 18 (Japan) Hirofumi Kono (Hokkaido Nippon-Ham Fighters)

Catchers

- 22 (Japan) Fujio Tamura (Hokkaido Nippon-Ham Fighters)
- 27 (Japan) Tsutomu Itō (Seibu Lions)
- 39 (Japan) Takeshi Nakamura (Chunichi Dragons)
- 25 (Japan) Kazumasa Ichikawa (Yokohama Taiyo Whales)
- 40 (Japan) Mitsuo Tatsukawa (Hiroshima Toyo Carp)

Infielders

- 06 (Japan) Hiromitsu Ochiai (Chiba Lotte Orions)
- 16 (Japan) Akinobu Okada (Hanshin Tigers)
- 08 (Japan) Hiromi Matsunaga (Osaka Kintetsu Buffaloes)
- 03 (Japan) Kazuhiro Kiyohara (Siebu Lions)
- 07 (Japan) Hiromichi Ishige (Seibu Lions)
- 24 (Japan) Kiyoshi Nakahata (Yomiuri Giants)
- 08 (Japan) Tatsunori Hara (Yomiuri Giants)
- 07 (Japan) Akinobu Mayumi (Hanshin Tigers)
- 03 (Japan) Yutaka Takagi (Yokohama Taiyo Whales)
- 08 (Japan) Kazunori Shinozuka (Yomiuri Giants)
- 04 (Japan) Kozo Shoda (Hiroshima Toyo Carp)
- 36 (Japan) Takahiro Ikeyama (Tokyo Yakult Swallows)
- 08 (Japan) Katsumi Hirosawa (Tokyo Yakult Swallows)
- 05 (Japan) Toru Nimura (Chunichi Dragons)
- 06 (Japan) Yukio Tanaka (Hokkaido Nippon-Ham Fighters)
- 03 (Japan) Kazuyoshi Tatsunami (Chunichi Dragons)
- 05 (Japan) Hatsuhiko Tsuji (Seibu Lions)

Oufielders

- 03 (Japan) Kazuhiko Ishimine (Hankyu Braves)
- 07 (Japan) Hidekai Takazawa (Chiba Lotte Marines)
- 03 (Japan) Makoto Sasaki (Fukuoka Nankai Hawks)
- 31 (Japan) Kaname Yashiki (Yokohama Taiyo Whales)
- 26 (Japan) Shinji Hata (Tokyo Yakult Swallows)
- 09 (Japan) Hiromasa Arai (Osaka Kintetsu Buffaloes)

Coaching Staff

- 01 (Japan) Sadaharu Oh (Yomiuri Giants)
