= 1998 MLB Japan All-Star Series =

Team (Wins)	Managers
MLB All-Stars (6)	Mike Hargrove
All-Japan (2)	Shigeo Nagashima
- Dates: November 6–15, 1998
- Venues: Tokyo Dome; Fukuoka Dome; Osaka Dome
- MVP: Sammy Sosa (MLB All-Stars)

The 1998 MLB Japan All-Star Series was the sixth edition of the championship, a best-of-eight series between the All-Star teams from Major League Baseball (MLB) and Nippon Professional Baseball (NPB), then-called All-Japan.

MLB won the series by 6–2–0 and Sammy Sosa was named MVP.

== Results ==
Exhibition

Game	Date	Home team	Score	Away team	Location
1	November 6	Yomiuri Giants	1-4	MLB All-Stars	Tokyo Dome

Championship

Game	Date	Home team	Score	Away team	Location
1	November 7	All-Japan	1-8	MLB All-Stars	Tokyo Dome
2	November 8	MLB All-Stars	10–7	All-Japan	Tokyo Dome
3	November 10	All-Japan	6-2	MLB All-Stars	Fukuoka Dome
4	November 11	MLB All-Stars	0-1	All-Japan	Osaka Dome
5	November 12	All-Japan	0-2	MLB All-Stars	Osaka Dome
6	November 14	MLB All-Stars	9-0	All-Japan	Tokyo Dome
7	November 15	All-Japan	8-9	MLB All-Stars	Tokyo Dome

== Rosters ==
=== MLB All-Stars roster ===
Pitchers

- 32 (United States) Rick Helling - (Texas Rangers)
- 22 (United States) Al Leiter - (New York Mets)
- 34 (United States) Kevin Millwood - (Atlanta Braves)
- 50 (United States) Jamie Moyer - (Seattle Mariners)
- 40 (United States) Brett Tomko - (Cincinnati Reds)
- 38 (United States) Curt Schilling - (Philadelphia Phillies)
- 36 (United States) Tom Gordon - (Boston Red Sox)
- 51 (United States) Trevor Hoffman - (San Diego Padres)
- 42 (United States) Mike Jackson - (Cleveland Indians)
- 19 (United States) Dan Plesac - (Toronto Blue Jays)
- 41 (Venezuela) Ugueth Urbina - (Montreal Expos)
- 13 (United States) Billy Wagner - (Houston Astros)

Catchers

- 18 (United States) Jason Kendall - (Pittsburgh Pirates)
- 08 (Puerto Rico) Javy López - (Atlanta Braves)

Infielders

- 16 (United States) Jason Giambi - (Oakland Athletics)
- 25 (Puerto Rico) Carlos Delgado - (Toronto Blue Jays)
- 09 (United States) Damion Easley - (Detroit Tigers)
- 01 (United States) Fernando Viña - (Milwaukee Brewers)
- 05 (United States) Nomar Garciaparra - (Boston Red Sox)
- 10 (Cuba) Rey Ordóñez - (New York Mets)
- 09 (Mexico) Vinny Castilla - (Colorado Rockies)
- 17 (United States) B.J. Surhoff - (Baltimore Orioles)

Oufielders

- 21 (Dominican Republic) Sammy Sosa - (Chicago Cubs)
- 24 (Dominican Republic) Manny Ramirez - (Cleveland Indians)
- 23 (United States) Greg Vaughn - (San Diego Padres)
- 25 (Curaçao) Andruw Jones - (Atlanta Braves)
- 22 (Jamaica) Devon White - (Arizona Diamondbacks)
- 16 (United States) Garret Anderson - (Anaheim Angels)

Coaching Staff

- 30 (United States) Mike Hargrove - (Cleveland Indians)
- 25 (United States) Rich Dauer - (Kansas City Royals)
- 54 (United States) Leo Mazzone - (Atlanta Braves)
- 04 (Cuba) Cookie Rojas - (New York Mets)

=== NPB All-Stars (All-Japan) roster ===
Pitchers

- 11 (Japan) Kenshin Kawakami - (Chunichi Dragons)
- 17 (Japan) Kenjiro Kawasaki - (Yakult Swallows)
- 19 (Japan) Tetsuro Kawajiri - (Hanshin Tigers)
- 29 (Japan) Kanei Kobayashi - (Hiroshima Toyo Carp)
- 16 (Japan) Kazuhisa Ishii - (Yakult Swallows)
- 47 (Japan) Shigeki Noguchi - (Chunichi Dragons)
- 14 (Japan) Takashi Ishii - (Seibu Lions)
- 11 (Japan) Akinori Otsuka - (Kintetsu Buffaloes)
- 17 (Japan) Kazuhiro Takeda - (Fukuoka Daiei Hawks)
- 38 (Japan) Tatsuji Nishimura - (Fukuoka Daiei Hawks)
- 14 (Japan) Satoru Komiyama - (Chiba Lotte Marines)

Catchers

- 27 (Japan) Atsuya Furuta - (Yakult Swallows)
- 8 (Japan) Motonobu Tanishige - (Yokohama BayStars)
- 54 (Japan) Toshihiro Noguchi - (Nippon-Ham Fighters)

Infielders

- 5 (Japan) Kazuhiro Kiyohara - (Yomiuri Giants)
- 8 (Japan) Toshihisa Nishi - (Yomiuri Giants)
- 33 (Japan) Akira Eto - (Yomiuri Giants)
- 8 (Japan) Atsushi Kataoka - (Nippon-Ham Fighters)
- 3 (Japan) Norihiro Nakamura - (Kintetsu Buffaloes)
- 7 (Japan) Kazuo Matsui - (Seibu Lions)
- 5 (Japan) Takuro Ishii - (Yokohama BayStars)
- 7 (Japan) Makoto Imaoka - (Hanshin Tigers)

Oufielders

- 55 (Japan) Hideki Matsui - (Yomiuri Giants)
- 24 (Japan) Yoshinobu Takahashi - (Yomiuri Giants)
- 7 (Japan) Takanori Suzuki - (Yokohama BayStars)
- 7 (Japan) Naoyuki Ohmura - (Kintetsu Buffaloes)
- 51 (Japan) Ichiro Suzuki - (Orix BlueWave)
- 49 (Japan) Mitsuchika Hirai - (Chiba Lotte Marines)

Coaching Staff

- 33 (Japan) Shigeo Nagashima - (Yomiuri Giants)
- 89 (Japan) Sadaharu Oh - (Fukuoka Daiei Hawks)
