= 1992 MLB Japan All-Star Series =

Baseball series

The 1992 MLB Japan All-Star Series was the fourth edition of the championship, a best-of-eight series between the All-Star teams from Major League Baseball (MLB) and Nippon Professional Baseball (NPB), then-called All-Japan. For the first game, an exhibition matchup started against Nippon's Yomiuri Giants club - the first of its kind - at its home, Tokyo Dome.

MLB won the series by 6–1–1 and Mark Grace was named MVP.

== Results ==
Championship

Game	Winning team	Score	Losing team	Location
1	MLB All-Stars	11–00	Yomiuri Giants	Tokyo Dome
2	MLB All-Stars	09–04	All-Japan	Tokyo Dome
3	MLB All-Stars	03–01	All-Japan	Seibu Lions Stadium
4	All-Japan	10–03	MLB All-Stars	Tokyo Dome
5	Tie	00-00	Tie	Chiba Marine Stadium
6	MLB All-Stars	10–02	All-Japan	Koshien Stadium
7	MLB All-Stars	09–05	All-Japan	Tokyo Dome
8	MLB All-Stars	04–03	All-Japan	Tokyo Dome

== Rosters ==
=== MLB All-Stars roster ===
Pitchers

- 37 (United States) Norm Charlton - (Cincinnati Reds)
- 21 (United States) Roger Clemens - (Boston Red Sox)
- 12 (United States) Mark Langston - (California Angles)
- 32 (Nicaragua) Dennis Martínez - (Montreal Expos)
- 29 (United States) Jack McDowell - (Chicago White Sox)
- 30 (United States) Gregg Olson - (Baltimore Orioles)
- 38 (United States) Bob Patterson - (Pittsburgh Pirates)
- 29 (United States) Greg Swindell - (Cincinnati Reds)
- 39 (United States) Bob Tewksbury - (St. Louis Cardinals)
- 31 (United States) Duane Ward - (Toronto Blue Jays)

Catchers

- 10 (United States) Darren Daulton - (Philadelphia Phillies)
- 14 (United States) Mickey Tettleton - (Detroit Tigers)

Infielders

- 09 (Puerto Rico) Carlos Baerga - (Cleveland Indians)
- 26 (United States) Wade Boggs - (Boston Red Sox)
- 07 (United States) Craig Biggio - (Houston Astros)
- 45 (United States) Cecil Fielder - (Detroit Tigers)
- 24 (United States) Travis Fryman - (Detroit Tigers)
- 17 (United States) Mark Grace - (Chicago Cubs)
- 23 (United States) Eric Karros - (Los Angeles Dodgers)
- 15 (United States) Dave Hollins - (Philadelphia Phillies)
- 01 (United States) Ozzie Smith - (St. Louis Cardinals)

Oufielders

- 05 (United States) Ron Gant - (Atlanta Braves)
- 24 (United States) Ken Griffey Jr. - (Seattle Mariners)
- 24 (United States) Shane Mack - (Minnesota Twins)
- 29 (Puerto Rico) Rubén Sierra - (Oakland Athletics)
- 33 (Canada) Larry Walker - (Montreal Expos)

Coaching Staff

- 10 (United States) Tom Kelly - (Minnesota Twins)
- 29 (Panama) Rod Carew - (California Angels)
- 51 (United States) Ron Perranoski - (Los Angeles Dodgers)

=== NPB All-Stars (All-Japan) roster ===
Pitchers

- 17 (Japan) Hiromi Makihara (Yomiuri Giants)
- 18 (Japan) Masumi Kuwata (Yomiuri Giants)
- 41 (Japan) Hisanobu Watanabe (Seibu Lions)
- 46 (Japan) Yasuyuki Kawamoto (Chiba Lotte Marines)
- 11 (Japan) Hideo Nomo (Kintetsu Buffaloes)
- 22 (Japan) Kazuhiro Sasaki (Yokohama Taiyo Whales)
- 11 (Japan) Yukinaga Maeda (Chiba Lotte Marines)
- 19 (Japan) Motoyuki Akahori (Kintetsu Buffaloes)
- 21 (Japan) Kazutomo Miyamoto (Yomiuri Giants)
- 15 (Japan) Toshiro Yufune (Hanshin Tigers)
- 13 (Japan) Yasumitsu Shibata (Nippon-Ham Fighters)
- 15 (Japan) Koki Morita (Yokohama Taiyo Whales)
- 23 (Japan) Akihito Kaneishi (Nippon-Ham Fighters)
- 25 (Japan) Koichi Taniguchi (Yomiuri Giants)
- 31 (Japan) Katsuhito Mizuno (Yomiuri Giants)
- 15 (Paraguay) Yoichi Okabayashi (Yakult Swallows)
- 15 (Japan) Katsuyoshi Murata (Fukuoka Daiei Hawks)
- 59 (Japan) Hiroshi Ishige (Yomiuri Giants)
- 36 (Japan) Kiyoshi Hashimoto (Yomiuri Giants)
- 18 (Japan) Shinji Sasaoka (Hiroshima Toyo Carp)
- 11 (Japan) Masaki Saito (Yomiuri Giants)
- 34 (Japan) Koji Nakada (Hanshin Tigers)
- 34 (Japan) Kazuhisa Kawaguchi (Hiroshima Toyo Carp)
- 11 (Japan) Takehiro Ishii (Seibu Lions)

Catchers

- 22 (Japan) Fujio Tamura (Nippon-Ham Fighters)
- 27 (Japan) Tsutomu Itō (Seibu Lions)
- 22 (Japan) Hiromoto Okubo (Yomiuri Giants)
- 27 (Japan) Atsuya Furuta (Yakult Swallows)
- 9 (Japan) Shinichi Murata (Yomiuri Giants)

Infielders

- 6 (Japan) Hiromitsu Ochiai (Chunichi Dragons)
- 7 (Japan) Kenjiro Nomura (Hiroshima Toyo Carp)
- 10 (Japan) Norihiro Komada (Yomiuri Giants)
- 3 (Japan) Kazuhiro Kiyohara (Seibu Lions)
- 3 (Japan) Hiroo Ishii (Kintetsu Buffaloes)
- 8 (Japan) Hiromi Mastunaga (Orix BlueWave)
- 8 (Japan) Tatsunori Hara (Yomiuri Giants)
- 37 (Japan) Daisuke Motoki (Yomiuri Giants)
- 45 (Japan) Koichi Hori (Chiba Lotte Marines)
- 38 (Japan) Atsushi Kataoka (Nippon-Ham Fighters)
- 06 (Japan) Kazunori Shinozuka (Yomiuri Giants)
- 1 (Japan) Takahiro Ikeyama (Yakult Swallows)
- 24 (Japan) Takeshi Omori (Yomiuri Giants)
- 40 (Japan) Hiroshi Sato (Yomiuri Giants)
- 32 (Japan) Yuji Ono (Yomiuri Giants)
- 27 (Japan) Akihito Fukuo (Yomiuri Giants)

Oufielders

- 1 (Japan) Koji Akiyama (Seibu Lions)
- 44 (Japan) Satoshi Takahashi (Orix BlueWave)
- 3 (Japan) Makoto Sasaki (Fukuoka Daiei Hawks)
- 2 (Japan) Tetsuya Iida (Yakult Swallows)
- 3 (Japan) Hiroshi Yagi (Hanshin Tigers)
- 00 (Japan) Tsutomu Kameyama (Hanshin Tigers)
- 52 (Japan) Shinji Inoue (Yomiuri Giants)
- 2 (Japan) Terumitsu Kumano (Yomiuri Giants)
- 63 (Japan) Tsuyoshi Shinjo (Hanshin Tigers)
- 12 (Japan) Yoshihiro Nishioka (Yomiuri Giants)

Coaching Staff

- 87 (Japan) Masaaki Mori (Seibu Lions)

-
