= 1986 MLB Japan All-Star Series =

The 1986 MLB Japan All-Star Series, also known as the Super Major Series, was the first edition of the MLB Japan All-Star Series, a best-of-seven series between the all-star teams from Major League Baseball (MLB) and Nippon Professional Baseball (NPB), then-called All-Japan.

MLB won the series by 6–1–0 and Tony Peña was named MVP. The games were played in November 1986 after 19 months of negotiations between MLB and NPB; most of the MLB roster was drawn from the selections for the 1986 MLB All-Star Game, while the NPB chose Japanese players rather than Americans who played for Japanese teams.

== Results ==
Results by game
Game	Winning team	Score	Losing team	Location
1	MLB All-Stars	6–3	All-Japan	Korakuen Stadium
2	MLB All-Stars	9–2	All-Japan	Lions Stadium
3	MLB All-Stars	3–0	All-Japan	Korakuen Stadium
4	MLB All-Stars	13–3	All-Japan	Heiwadai Stadium
5	All-Japan	6–4	MLB All-Stars	Osaka Stadium
6	MLB All-Stars	15–3	All-Japan	Korakuen Stadium
7	MLB All-Stars	9–4	All-Japan	Korakuen Stadium

== Rosters ==
=== MLB All-Stars roster ===
Pitchers

- 47 (United States) Jack Morris (Detroit Tigers)
- 33 (United States) Mike Scott (Houston Astros)
- 49 (Mexico) Teddy Higuera (Milwaukee Brewers)
- 39 (United States) Mike Witt (California Angels)
- 29 (United States) Rick Rhoden (Pittsburgh Pirates)
- 41 (United States) Jeff Reardon (Montreal Expos)
- 21 (Puerto Rico) Willie Hernández (Detroit Tigers)
- 31 (United States) John Franco (Cincinnati Reds)
- 27 (United States) Greg Harris (Texas Rangers)

Catchers

- 06 (Dominican Republic) Tony Peña (Pittsburgh Pirates)
- 10 (United States) Rich Gedman (Boston Red Sox)

Infielders

- 21 (United States) Wally Joyner (California Angels)
- 27 (United States) Glenn Davis (Houston Astros)
- 23 (United States) Ryne Sandberg (Chicago Cubs)
- 01 (United States) Ozzie Smith (St. Louis Cardinals)
- 08 (United States) Cal Ripken Jr. (Baltimore Orioles)
- 26 (United States) Brook Jacoby (Cleveland Indians)
- 20 (United States) Frank White (Kansas City Royals)
- 25 (United States) Buddy Bell (Cincinnati Reds)

Oufielders

- 19 (United States) Tony Gwynn (San Diego Padres)
- 03 (United States) Dale Murphy (Atlanta Braves)
- 29 (United States) Jesse Barfield (Toronto Blue Jays)
- 33 (Cuba) Jose Canseco (Oakland Athletics)
- 09 (United States) Von Hayes (Philadelphia Phillies)

Coaching Staff

- 05 (United States) Davey Johnson (New York Mets)
- 02 (United States) Bobby Valentine (Texas Rangers)
- 30 (United States) Mel Stottlemyre (New York Mets)

=== NPB All-Stars (All-Japan) roster ===
Pitchers

- 17 (Japan) Hiromi Makihara (Yomiuri Giants)
- 13 (Japan) Yoshiaki Ishimoto (Osaka Kintetsu Buffaloes)
- 41 (Japan) Hisanobu Watanabe (Seibu Lions)
- 11 (Japan) Yoshinori Sato (Osaka Kintetsu Buffaloes)
- 19 (Japan) Kiyooki Nakanishi (Hanshin Tigers)
- 20 (Japan) Manabu Kitabeppu (Hiroshima Toyo Carp)
- 34 (Japan) Tatsuo Komatsu (Chinuchi Dragons)
- 37 (Japan) Hiroshi Tsuno (Hokkaido Nippon-Ham Fighters)
- 13 (Japan) Yasumitsu Shibata (Hokkaido Nippon-Ham Fighters)
- 30 (Japan) Suguru Egawa (Yomiuri Giants)
- 11 (Japan) Tsuneo Horii (Yokohama Taiyo Whales)
- 17 (Japan) Akio Saito (Yokohama Taiyo Whales)
- 47 (Japan) Kimiyasu Kudō (Seibu Lions)
- 34 (Japan) Hikaru Takano (Tokyo Yakult Swallows)
- 18 (Japan) Taigen Kaku (Seibu Lions)
- 31 (Japan) Katsuhito Mizuno (Yomiuri Giants)
- 14 (Japan) Tsunemi Tsuda (Hiroshima Toyo Carp)
- 34 (Japan) Nobuyuki Hoshino (Hanshin Tigers)
- 24 (Japan) Yutaka Ono (Hiroshima Toyo Carp)
- 15 (Japan) Katsuo Soh (Chiba Lotte Orions)

Catchers

- 22 (Japan) Fujio Tamura (Hokkaido Nippon-Ham Fighters)
- 15 (Japan) Kazuhiro Yamakura (Yomiuri Giants)

Infielders

- 06 (Japan) Hiromitsu Ochiai (Chiba Lotte Orions)
- 16 (Japan) Akinobu Okada (Hanshin Tigers)
- 08 (Japan) Hiromi Matsunaga (Osaka Kintetsu Buffaloes)
- 02 (Japan) Yoshihiko Takahashi (Hiroshima Toyo Carp)
- 07 (Japan) Hiromichi Ishige (Seibu Lions)
- 24 (Japan) Kiyoshi Nakahata (Yomiuri Giants)
- 04 (Japan) Daijiro Oishi (Osaka Kintetsu Buffaloes)
- 05 (Japan) Hatsuhiko Tsuji (Seibu Lions)
- 03 (Japan) Yutaka Takagi (Yokohama Taiyo Whales)

Oufielders

- 02 (Japan) Koji Yamamoto (Hiroshima Toyo Carp)
- 24 (Japan) Koji Akiyama (Seibu Lions)
- 29 (Japan) Kazunori Yamamoto (Fukuoka Nankai Hawks)
- 26 (Japan) Eiji Kanamori (Seibu Lions)

Coaching Staff

- 61 (Japan) Sadao Kondoh (Yokohama Taiyo Whales)
