= 2002 MLB Japan All-Star Series =

The 2002 MLB Japan All-Star Series was the eighth edition of the championship, a best-of-eight series between the All-Star teams from Major League Baseball (MLB) and Nippon Professional Baseball (NPB).

MLB won the series by 5–3–0 and Torii Hunter was named MVP.

== Results ==
Championship

Game	Winning team	Score	Losing team	Location
1	MLB All-Stars	8–1	NPB Giants	Tokyo Dome
2	NPB All-Stars	8–4	MLB All-Stars	Tokyo Dome
3	NPB All-Stars	8–2	MLB All-Stars	Fukuoka Dome
4	NPB All-Stars	8–6	MLB All-Stars	Osaka Dome
5	MLB All-Stars	6–5	NPB All-Stars	Sapporo Dome
6	MLB All-Stars	4–0	NPB All-Stars	Tokyo Dome
7	MLB All-Stars	12–7	NPB All-Stars	Tokyo Dome
8	MLB All-Stars	4–2	NPB All-Stars	Tokyo Dome

== Rosters ==
=== MLB All-Stars roster ===
Pitchers

- 43 (Dominican Republic) Miguel Batista (Arizona Diamondbacks)
- 56 (United States) Mark Buehrle (Chicago White Sox)
- 40 (Dominican Republic) Bartolo Colón (Montreal Expos)
- 39 (United States) Mike Fetters (Arizona Diamondbacks)
- 38 (Canada) Éric Gagné (Los Angeles Dodgers)
- 50 (United States) Brian Lawrence (San Diego Padres)
- 13 (Mexico) Rodrigo López (Baltimore Orioles)
- 24 (Japan) Tomo Ohka (Montreal Expos)
- 31 (United States) Brad Penny (Florida Marlins)
- 33 (Puerto Rico) J. C. Romero (Minnesota Twins)
- 60 (United States) Scott Schoeneweis (Anaheim Angels)
- 43 (United States) Randy Wolf (Philadelphia Phillies)

Catchers

- 16 (United States) Paul Lo Duca (Los Angeles Dodgers)
- 26 (United States) A. J. Pierzynski (Minnesota Twins)

Infielders

- 12 (Puerto Rico) Roberto Alomar (New York Mets)
- 03 (United States) Eric Chávez (Oakland Athletics)
- 22 (United States) David Eckstein (Anaheim Angels)
- 25 (United States) Jason Giambi (New York Yankees)
- 11 (United States) Eric Hinske (Toronto Blue Jays)
- 25 (United States) Derrek Lee (Florida Marlins)
- 11 (United States) Jimmy Rollins (Philadelphia Phillies)
- 37 (United States) Junior Spivey (Arizona Diamondbacks)

Oufielders

- 25 (United States) Barry Bonds (San Francisco Giants)
- 05 (United States) Pat Burrell (Philadelphia Phillies)
- 48 (United States) Torii Hunter (Minnesota Twins)
- 11 (United States) Jacque Jones (Minnesota Twins)
- 51 (Japan) Ichiro Suzuki (Seattle Mariners)
- 51 (Puerto Rico) Bernie Williams (New York Yankees)

Coaching Staff

- 18 (United States) Art Howe (New York Mets)
- 02 (Puerto Rico) Sandy Alomar Sr. (Colorado Rockies)
- 08 (United States) Rudy Jaramillo (Texas Rangers)
- 36 (United States) Rick Peterson (Oakland Athletics)

=== NPB All-Stars roster ===
Pitchers

- 99 (Taiwan) Chang Chih-Chia (Seibu Lions)
- 18 (Japan) Shugo Fujii (Yakult Swallows)
- 53 (Japan) Ryota Igarashi (Yakult Swallows)
- 29 (Japan) Kei Igawa (Hanshin Tigers)
- 61 (Japan) Hirotoshi Ishii (Yakult Swallows)
- 48 (Japan) Hisashi Iwakuma (Osaka Kintetsu Buffaloes)
- 11 (Japan) Kenshin Kawakami (Chunichi Dragons)
- 30 (Japan) Masahide Kobayashi (Chiba Lotte Marines)
- 29 (Japan) Koji Mitsui (Seibu Lions)
- 19 (Japan) Shinji Mori (Seibu Lions)
- 39 (Japan) Yasuhiro Oyamada (Hiroshima Toyo Carp)
- 19 (Japan) Koji Uehara (Yomiuri Giants)

Catchers

- 10 (Japan) Shinnosuke Abe (Yomiuri Giants)
- 8 (Japan) Masaumi Shimizu (Chiba Lotte Marines)
- 7 (Japan) Motonobu Tanishige (Chunichi Dragons)

Infielders

- 42 (Venezuela) Alex Cabrera (Seibu Lions)
- 7 (Japan) Makoto Imaoka (Hanshin Tigers)
- 5 (Japan) Takuro Ishii (Yokohama BayStars)
- 1 (Japan) Akinori Iwamura (Yakult Swallows)
- 9 (Japan) Hiroki Kokubo (Fukuoka Daiei Hawks)
- 7 (Japan) Kazuo Matsui (Seibu Lions)
- 5 (Japan) Norihiro Nakamura (Osaka Kintetsu Buffaloes)
- 2 (Japan) Michihiro Ogasawara (Nippon-Ham Fighters)

Outfielders

- 1 (Japan) Kosuke Fukudome (Chunichi Dragons)
- 55 (Japan) Hideki Matsui (Yomiuri Giants)
- 9 (Japan) Takayuki Shimizu (Yomiuri Giants)
- 10 (Japan) Yoshitomo Tani (Orix Bluewave)
- 5 (Japan) Kazuhiro Wada (Seibu Lions)

Coaching Staff

- 83 (Japan) Tatsunori Hara (Yomiuri Giants)
- 73 (Japan) Haruki Ihara (Seibu Lions)
