= 2000 MLB Japan All-Star Series =

The 2000 MLB Japan All-Star Series was the seventh edition of the championship, a best-of-eight series between the All-Star teams from Major League Baseball (MLB) and Nippon Professional Baseball (NPB).

MLB won the series by 5–2–1 and Barry Bonds was named MVP.

== Results ==
Championship

Game	Winning team	Score	Losing team	Location
1	MLB All-Stars	08-05	NPB All-Stars	Tokyo Dome
2	MLB All-Stars	07-05	NPB All-Stars	Tokyo Dome
3	NPB All-Stars	14-02	MLB All-Stars	Tokyo Dome
4	Tie	02-02	Tie	Tokyo Dome
5	MLB All-Stars	05-01	NPB All-Stars	Tokyo Dome
6	NPB All-Stars	01-00	MLB All-Stars	Nagoya Dome
7	MLB All-Stars	13-05	NPB All-Stars	Tokyo Dome
8	MLB All-Stars	05-04	NPB All-Stars	Tokyo Dome

== Rosters ==
=== MLB All-Stars roster ===
Pitchers

- 46 (Canada) Ryan Dempster (Florida Marlins)
- 29 (United States) Keith Foulke (Chicago White Sox)
- 32 (South Vietnam) Danny Graves (Cincinnati Reds)
- 61 (Cuba) Liván Hernández (San Francisco Giants)
- 51 (United States) Randy Johnson (Arizona Diamondbacks)
- 32 (United States) Albie Lopez (Tampa Bay Devil Rays)
- 32 (United States) Derek Lowe (Boston Red Sox)
- 21 (United States) Eric Milton (Minnesota Twins)
- 28 (United States) Mike Myers (Colorado Rockies)
- 37 (United States) Mike Remlinger (Atlanta Braves)
- 22 (Japan) Kazuhiro Sasaki (Seattle Mariners)
- 33 (United States) Mike Sirotka (Chicago White Sox)
- 23 (Puerto Rico) Javier Vázquez (Montreal Expos)

Catchers

- 15 (Puerto Rico) Sandy Alomar Jr. (Cleveland Indians)
- 01 (Puerto Rico) Bengie Molina (Anaheim Angels)

Infielders

- 12 (Puerto Rico) Roberto Alomar (Cleveland Indians)
- 25 (Puerto Rico) Carlos Delgado (Toronto Blue Jays)
- 25 (United States) Troy Glaus (Anaheim Angels)
- 21 (United States) Jeff Kent (San Francisco Giants)
- 23 (United States) Phil Nevin (San Diego Padres)
- 29 (United States) Mike Sweeney (Kansas City Royals)
- 03 (Puerto Rico) Jose Vidro (Montreal Expos)
- 13 (Venezuela) Omar Vizquel (Cleveland Indians)

Outfielders

- 25 (United States) Barry Bonds (San Francisco Giants)
- 15 (United States) Shawn Green (Los Angeles Dodgers)
- 20 (United States) Luis Gonzalez (Arizona Diamondbacks)
- 44 (United States) Jay Payton (New York Mets)
- 10 (United States) Gary Sheffield (Los Angeles Dodgers)

Coaching Staff

- 06 (United States) Bobby Cox (Atlanta Braves)
- 43 (United States) Cito Gaston (Toronto Blue Jays)
- 16 (United States) Joe Kerrigan (Boston Red Sox)
- 18 (United States) John Vukovich (Philadelphia Phillies)

=== NPB All-Stars roster ===
Pitchers

- 54 (Japan) Tomohiro Kuroki - (Chiba Lotte Marines)
- 36 (Japan) Hisanori Takahashi - (Yomiuri Giants)
- 19 (Japan) Tetsuro Kawajiri - (Hanshin Tigers)
- 53 (Japan) Ryota Igarashi - (Yakult Swallows)
- 14 (Japan) Kenichi Wakatabe - (Fukuoka Daiei Hawks)
- 30 (Japan) Masahide Kobayashi - (Chiba Lotte Marines)
- 14 (Japan) Takashi Ishii - (Seibu Lions)
- 13 (Japan) Minoru Kasai - (Hanshin Tigers)
- 19 (Japan) Shinji Mori - (Seibu Lions)
- 24 (Japan) Tsuyoshi Shimoyanagi - (Nippon-Ham Fighters)
- 18 (Japan) Shinji Sasaoka - (Hiroshima Toyo Carp)
- 49 (Japan) Shuji Yoshida - (Fukuoka Daiei Hawks)

Catchers

- 2 (Japan) Kenji Johjima - (Fukuoka Daiei Hawks)
- 27 (Japan) Atsuya Furuta - (Yakult Swallows)
- 54 (Japan) Toshihiro Noguchi - (Nippon-Ham Fighters)

Infielders

- 2 (Japan) Michihiro Ogasawara - (Nippon-Ham Fighters)
- 8 (Japan) Toshihisa Nishi - (Yomiuri Giants)
- 22 (Japan) Takeshi Yamasaki - (Chunichi Dragons)
- 3 (Japan) Hiroo Ishii - (Chiba Lotte Marines)
- 3 (Japan) Norihiro Nakamura - (Osaka Kintetsu Buffaloes)
- 6 (Japan) Shinya Miyamoto - (Yakult Swallows)
- 1 (Japan) Makoto Kosaka - (Chiba Lotte Marines)

Oufielders

- 55 (Japan) Hideki Matsui - (Yomiuri Giants)
- 24 (Japan) Yoshinobu Takahashi - (Yomiuri Giants)
- 37 (Japan) Tatsuhiko Kinjō - (Yokohama BayStars)
- 6 (Japan) So Taguchi - (Orix BlueWave)
- 5 (Japan) Tsuyoshi Shinjo - (Hanshin Tigers)
- 10 (Japan) Tomoaki Kanemoto - (Hiroshima Toyo Carp)

Coaching Staff

- 33 (Japan) Shigeo Nagashima - (Yomiuri Giants)
- 89 (Japan) Sadaharu Oh - (Fukuoka Daiei Hawks)
