= 2004 MLB Japan All-Star Series =

The 2004 MLB Japan All-Star Series was the ninth edition of the championship, a best-of-eight series between the All-Star teams from Major League Baseball (MLB) and Nippon Professional Baseball (NPB).

MLB won the series by 5–3–0 and Vernon Wells was named MVP.

== Results ==
Championship

Game	Winning team	Score	Losing team	Location
1	MLB All-Stars	07-02	NPB All-Stars	Tokyo Dome
2	MLB All-Stars	05-03	NPB All-Stars	Tokyo Dome
3	MLB All-Stars	07-03	NPB All-Stars	Tokyo Dome
4	MLB All-Stars	07-02	NPB All-Stars	Fukuoka Dome
5	NPB All-Stars	03-01	MLB All-Stars	Osaka Dome
6	NPB All-Stars	05-01	MLB All-Stars	Sapporo Dome
7	NPB All-Stars	03-02	MLB All-Stars	Nagoya Dome
8	MLB All-Stars	05-00	NPB All-Stars	Tokyo Dome

== Rosters ==
=== MLB All-Stars roster ===
Pitchers

- 40 (Puerto Rico) Kiko Calero (St. Louis Cardinals)
- 22 (United States) Roger Clemens (Houston Astros)
- 17 (Japan) Kazuhisa Ishii (Los Angeles Dodgers)
- 56 (United States) Ray King (St. Louis Cardinals)
- 38 (United States) Scott Linebrink (San Diego Padres)
- 49 (United States) Kyle Lohse (Minnesota Twins)
- 21 (United States) Jason Marquis (St. Louis Cardinals)
- 16 (Japan) Akinori Otsuka (San Diego Padres)
- 44 (United States) Jake Peavy (San Diego Padres)
- 18 (United States) Mark Redman (Oakland Athletics)
- 37 (United States) Chris Reitsma (Atlanta Braves)
- 57 (Venezuela) Francisco Rodriguez (Anaheim Angels)
- 62 (United States) Scot Shields (Anaheim Angels)
- 35 (United States) Dontrelle Willis (Florida Marlins)

Catchers

- 23 (United States) Johnny Estrada (Atlanta Braves)
- 41 (Venezuela) Victor Martinez (Cleveland Indians)

Infielders

- 09 (United States) Hank Blalock (Texas Rangers)
- 13 (Puerto Rico) Alex Cora (Los Angeles Dodgers)
- 22 (United States) Marcus Giles (Atlanta Braves)
- 34 (Dominican Republic) David Ortiz (Boston Red Sox)
- 02 (United States) Jack Wilson (Pittsburgh Pirates)
- 10 (United States) Michael Young (Texas Rangers)

Oufielders

- 18 (United States) Moisés Alou (Chicago Cubs)
- 24 (Venezuela) Miguel Cabrera (Florida Marlins)
- 13 (United States) Carl Crawford (Tampa Bay Devil Rays)
- 24 (Dominican Republic) Manny Ramirez (Boston Red Sox)
- 10 (United States) Vernon Wells (Toronto Blue Jays)
- 06 (United States) Brad Wilkerson (Montreal Expos)

Coaching Staff

- 15 (United States) Bruce Bochy (San Diego Padres)
- 48 (United States) Jim Colborn (Los Angeles Dodgers)
- 39 (United States) Pat Corrales (Atlanta Braves)
- 28 (United States) Bill Robinson (Florida Marlins)

=== NPB All-Stars roster ===
Pitchers

- 18 (Japan) Nagisa Arakaki (Fukuoka Daiei Hawks)
- 53 (Japan) Ryota Igarashi (Yakult Swallows)
- 29 (Japan) Kei Igawa (Hanshin Tigers)
- 61 (Japan) Hirotoshi Ishii (Yakult Swallows)
- 17 (Japan) Takeharu Kato (Yokohama BayStars)
- 41 (Japan) Hiroyuki Kobayashi (Chiba Lotte Marines)
- 18 (Japan) Daisuke Matsuzaka (Seibu Lions)
- 57 (Japan) Koji Mise (Fukuoka Daiei Hawks)
- 21 (Japan) Hisashi Iwakuma (Osaka Kintetsu Buffaloes)
- 19 (Japan) Koji Uehara (Yomiuri Giants)
- 31 (Japan) Shunsuke Watanabe (Chiba Lotte Marines)
- 18 (Japan) Kazuo Yamaguchi (Orix BlueWave)
- 15 (Japan) Yukiya Yokoyama (Hokkaido Nippon-Ham Fighters)

Catchers

- 10 (Japan) Shinnosuke Abe (Yomiuri Giants)
- 27 (Japan) Atsuya Furuta (Yakult Swallows)
- 2 (Japan) Kenji Johjima (Fukuoka Daiei Hawks)

Infielders

- 9 (Japan) Kazuya Fukuura (Chiba Lotte Marines)
- 6 (Japan) Hirokazu Ibata (Chunichi Dragons)
- 7 (Japan) Makoto Imaoka (Hanshin Tigers)
- 1 (Japan) Akinori Iwamura (Yakult Swallows)
- 3 (Japan) Hiroyuki Nakajima (Seibu Lions)
- 8 (Japan) Toshihisa Nishi (Yomiuri Giants)
- 2 (Japan) Michihiro Ogasawara (Hokkaido Nippon-Ham Fighters)

Outfielders

- 53 (Japan) Norihiro Akahoshi (Hanshin Tigers)
- 10 (Japan) Takahiro Saeki (Yokohama BayStars)
- 55 (Japan) Shigenobu Shima (Hiroshima Toyo Carp)
- 6 (Japan) Hitoshi Tamura (Yokohama BayStars)
- 5 (Japan) Kazuhiro Wada (Seibu Lions)

Coaching Staff

- 89 (Japan) Sadaharu Oh (Fukuoka Daiei Hawks)
- 87 (Japan) Takao Obana (Fukuoka Daiei Hawks)
- 69 (Japan) Hiromasa Arai (Fukuoka Daiei Hawks)
