= List of top Nippon Professional Baseball strikeout pitchers =

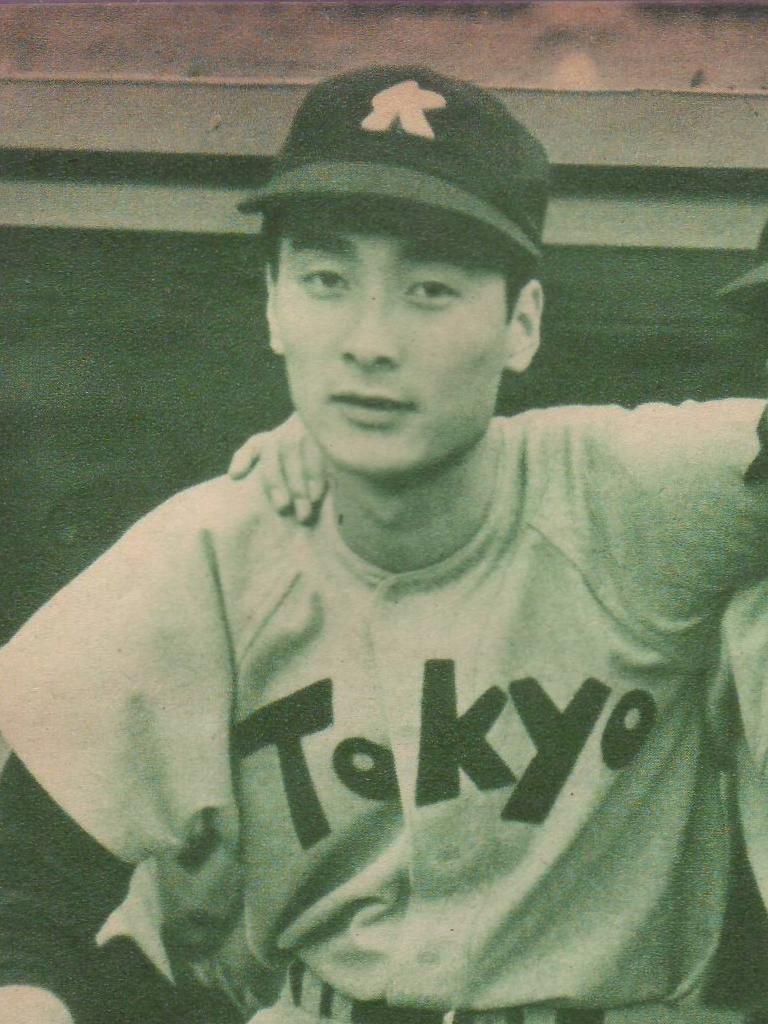
Masaichi Kaneda struck out the most batters in Japanese history with 4,490. He is the only Japanese player to strike out 4,000 batters.

The following is a list of Nippon Professional Baseball pitchers who have recorded at least 2,000 strikeouts. In baseball, a strikeout occurs when the batter receives three strikes during his time at bat. Strikeouts are associated with dominance on the part of the pitcher and failure on the part of the batter. 24 pitchers have achieved the distinction of striking out 2,000 batters. Takayuki Kishi and Hideaki Wakui are currently the only active players with 2,000 strikeouts as of 2025. Kazumi Takahashi came the closest to missing out on 2,000 batters, striking out 1,997.

Masaichi Kaneda has the most career strikeouts in Nippon Professional Baseball. During a 19-year career, he struck out 4,490 batters.

== The List ==
†	Denotes elected to Japanese Baseball Hall of Fame.
**Bold**	Denotes active player.

A player is considered "inactive" if he has not played baseball for one year or has announced his retirement.
Stats updated as of the end of 2025 season.

Rank	Player (R/L)	K	Years pitched	Innings pitched
1	Masaichi Kaneda (L) †	4,490	1950–1969	5,526.2
2	Tetsuya Yoneda (R) †	3,388	1956–1977	5,130
3	Masaaki Koyama (R) †	3,159	1953–1973	4,899
4	Keishi Suzuki (L) †	3,061	1966–1985	4,600.1
5	Yutaka Enatsu (L)	2,987	1967–1984	3,196
6	Takao Kajimoto (L) †	2,945	1954–1973	4,208
7	Kimiyasu Kudoh (L) †	2,859	1981–2010	3,336.2
8	Kazuhisa Inao (R) †	2,574	1956–1969	3,599
9	Daisuke Miura (R)	2,481	1992–2016	3,276
10	Choji Murata (R) †	2,363	1968–1990	3,331.1
11	Masahiro Yamamoto (L)	2,310	1986–2015	3,348.2
12	Minoru Murayama (R) †	2,271	1959–1972	3,050.1
13	Shoichi Ono (L)	2,244	1956–1970	2,909
14	Takayuki Kishi (R)	2,200	2007-present	2,680
15	Toshiya Sugiuchi (L)	2,156	2002–2015	2,091.1
16	Kazuhisa Ishii (L)	2,115	1992-2013	2,153.1
17	Hiromi Makihara (R)	2,111	1983–2001	2,485
18	Kazuhisa Kawaguchi (L)	2,092	1981–1998	2,410
19	Hideaki Wakui (R)	2,085	2005-present	2,857.1
20	Fumiya Nishiguchi (R)	2,082	1995-2015	2,527.2
21	Hisashi Yamada (R) †	2,058	1969–1988	3,865
22	Masaji Hiramatsu (R)	2,045	1967-1984	3,360.2
23	Nobuyuki Hoshino (L)	2,041	1984–2002	2,669.1
24	Hiromu Matsuoka (R)	2,008	1968–1985	3,240

== See also ==
- List of Major League Baseball career strikeout leaders
