= Masaji Hiramatsu =

Japanese baseball player

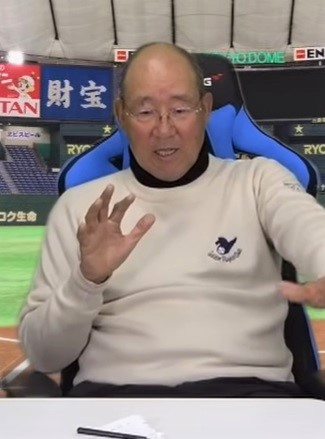
- Pitcher
- Born: September 19, 1947 (age 79); Takahashi, Okayama, Japan
- Batted: Right Threw: Right

debut
- 1967, for the Taiyo Whales

Last appearance
- 1984, for the Yokohama Taiyo Whales

Career statistics
- Win–loss record: 201–196
- Earned run average: 3.31
- Strikeouts: 2,045
- Stats at Baseball Reference

Teams
- Taiyo Whales / Yokohama Taiyo Whales (1967–1984)

Career highlights and awards
- Eiji Sawamura Award (1970)

Member of the Japanese

Baseball Hall of Fame
- Induction: 2017

Masaji Hiramatsu (平松 政次, Hiramatsu Masaji; born September 19, 1947) is a Japanese former professional baseball pitcher in Nippon Professional Baseball (NPB). He played for the Taiyo Whales / Yokohama Taiyo Whales from 1967 to 1984. He won the Eiji Sawamura Award in 1970. In his career, he had 2,045 strikeouts (in 3,360.2 innings), which is currently 22nd among all NPB players in history. He was inducted into the Japanese Baseball Hall of Fame in 2017.

== See also ==
- List of top Nippon Professional Baseball strikeout pitchers
