= Hiroshi Tsuno =

- Pitcher
- Born: August 6, 1965; Shimanto, Kōchi
- Batted: Right Threw: Right

NPB debut
- May 9, 1984, for the Nippon Ham Fighters

Last appearance
- 1997, for the Chiba Lotte Marines

NPB statistics
- Win–loss record: 53–71
- Earned run average: 4.61
- Strikeouts: 554
- Stats at Baseball Reference

Teams
- Nippon Ham Fighters (1984–1991); Hiroshima Toyo Carp (1992); Chunichi Dragons (1993); Chiba Lotte Marines (1995–1997)

Hiroshi Tsuno (津野浩, Tsuno Hiroshi; born August 6, 1965) is a retired Japanese professional baseball pitcher. He played in Nippon Professional Baseball for the Nippon Ham Fighters, Hiroshima Toyo Carp, Chunichi Dragons, and Chiba Lotte Marines.
