= Koji Uehara =

Japanese baseball player (born 1975)

Koji Uehara 上原 浩治
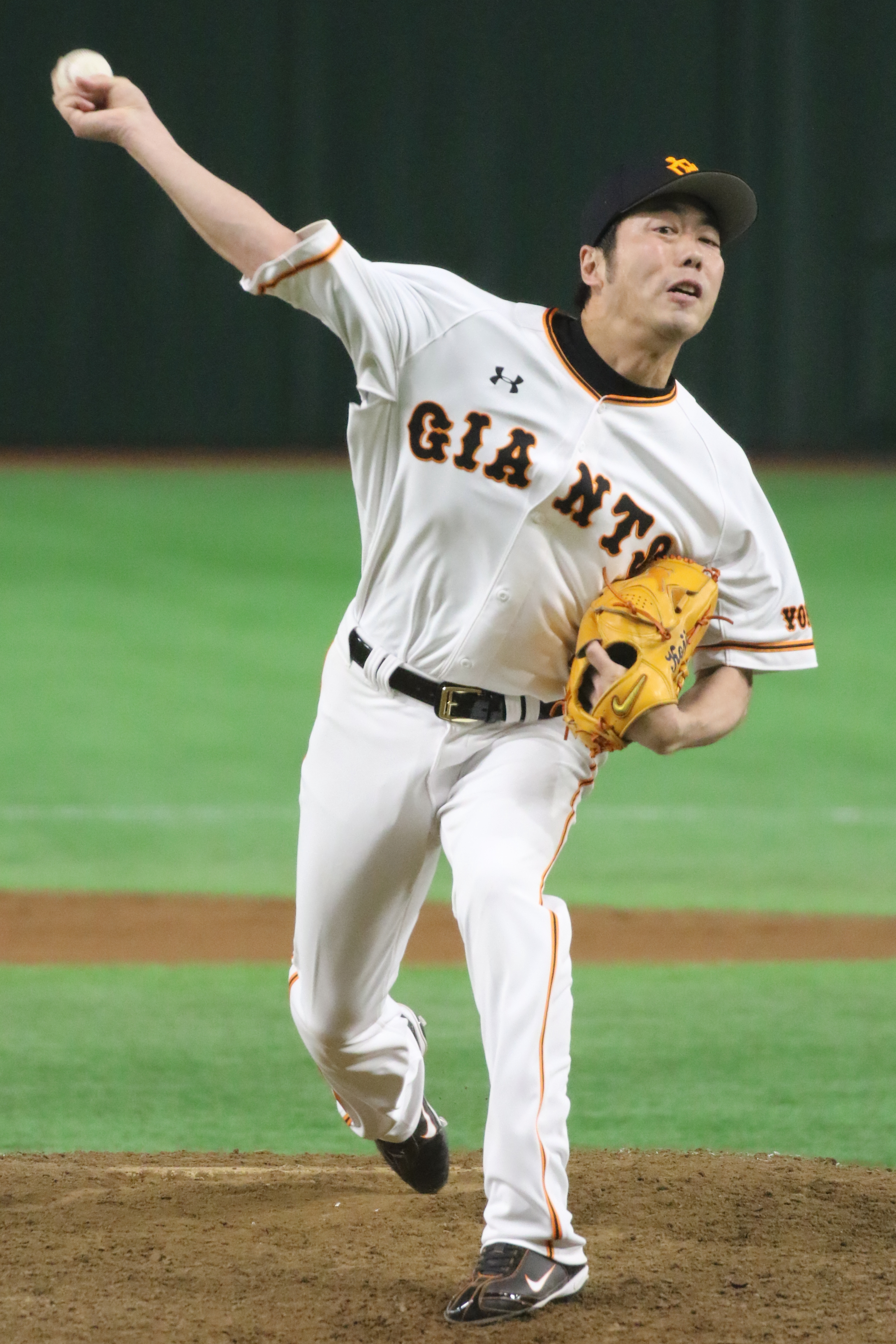
- Uehara with the Yomiuri Giants in 2018
- Pitcher
- Born: April 3, 1975 (age 51); Neyagawa, Osaka, Japan
- Batted: Right Threw: Right

Professional debut
- NPB: March 29, 1999, for the Yomiuri Giants
- MLB: April 8, 2009, for the Baltimore Orioles

Last appearance
- MLB: September 2, 2017, for the Chicago Cubs
- NPB: 2019, for the Yomiuri Giants

NPB statistics
- Win–loss record: 112–67
- Earned run average: 3.03
- Strikeouts: 1,410

MLB statistics
- Win–loss record: 22–26
- Earned run average: 2.66
- Strikeouts: 572
- Saves: 95
- Stats at Baseball Reference

Teams
- Yomiuri Giants (1999–2008); Baltimore Orioles (2009–2011); Texas Rangers (2011–2012); Boston Red Sox (2013–2016); Chicago Cubs (2017); Yomiuri Giants (2018–2019)

Career highlights and awards
- NPB: 9× All-Star (1999–2005, 2007, 2018); 2× Japan Series champion (2000, 2002); 2× Eiji Sawamura Award (1999, 2002); Triple Crown (1999); Central League Rookie of the Year (1999); 2× Golden Glove (1999, 2003); 2× Best Nine Award (1999, 2002); 2× NPB wins leader (1999, 2002); 2× NPB ERA leader (1999, 2004); 2× NPB strikeout leader (1999, 2003); MLB: All-Star (2014); World Series champion (2013); ALCS MVP (2013)
Medals
Men's baseball
Representing Japan
Intercontinental Cup
| Gold medal – first place | 1997 Barcelona | Team |
Olympic Games
| Bronze medal – third place | 2004 Athens | Team |
World Baseball Classic
| Gold medal – first place | 2006 San Diego | Team |

Koji Uehara (上原 浩治, Uehara Kōji; [ɯehara koːdʑi]; born April 3, 1975) is a Japanese former professional baseball pitcher. He played for the Yomiuri Giants of Nippon Professional Baseball (NPB), as well as the Baltimore Orioles, Texas Rangers, Boston Red Sox, and Chicago Cubs of Major League Baseball (MLB).

A right-handed pitcher, Uehara has an MLB career strikeout rate of 10.7 K/9 innings and a walk rate of 1.5 BB/9 innings through the 2017 season. Through the 2017 season, his career 7.33 K/BB is the best in MLB history for a player with at least 100 innings pitched. Uehara won the 2013 ALCS MVP Award, and closed the final game of the 2013 World Series against the St. Louis Cardinals. With his World Series win, Uehara became one of sixteen players in history to have won both a World Series and a World Baseball Classic.

== Career ==
=== Amateur career ===
Uehara graduated from the Osaka University of Health and Sport Sciences. In 1998, Uehara rejected a contract worth $3 million from the then-Anaheim Angels and signed with Yomiuri. The Angels had expressed their continued interest in Uehara, as scouting director Eddie Bane had stated that acquiring either Uehara or Daisuke Matsuzaka was a top priority for the team. However, many other teams, including the Yankees, Dodgers, Red Sox, Mets, and Orioles, had shown interest in bidding for Uehara if he were to become available.

=== Yomiuri Giants ===
The Yomiuri Giants of Nippon Professional Baseball selected Uehara in the first round of the 1998 NPB draft. In 1999, he had a successful rookie year with 15 consecutive wins that broke the all-time rookie record, won the Rookie of the Year Award and the Eiji Sawamura Award, and led in wins, ERA, strikeouts and winning percentage.

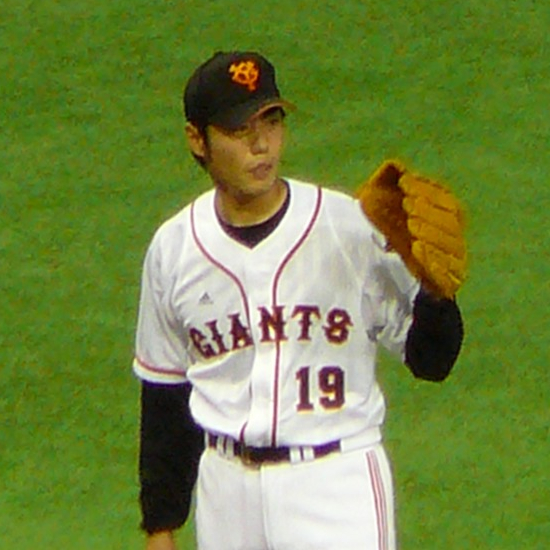
Uehara with the Yomiuri Giants in 2006

In the final game of the 1999 season against the Yakult Swallows, with the league standings already decided, Uehara was ordered to intentionally walk the Swallows' Roberto Petagine in order to give the Giants' Hideki Matsui a chance to catch Petagine for the home run title. The competitive Uehara complied with the order but showed his bitterness on the mound, kicking the dirt repeatedly and even shedding tears after the third intentional walk.

In 2001, Uehara finished with a 4.02 ERA, the highest of his career in Japan. In 2002, he rebounded, leading the Central League in wins and collected his second Sawamura Award. After the 2002 season, he represented Japan in the Major League Baseball Japan All-Star Series and on November 11 became the first pitcher in over a year to strike out Barry Bonds three consecutive times in one game. This achievement raised his profile in American Major League Baseball.

Uehara was injured before the 2007 season which made him a late appearance, and in that season, he became a closer instead, recorded a 1.74 ERA with 4 wins, 3 losses, and 32 saves. Though showing a good ability both starting and closing, he returned as a starting pitcher in the 2008 season. He left the Giants after that season becoming a free agent and allowing him to play in Major League Baseball.

Uehara asserted his preference in public to be transferred to a Major League Baseball team through the posting system. His efforts had been rebuffed by the Yomiuri Giants' front office. He was expected to be eligible for free agency in 2007 (but that was postponed to 2008 due to injury). He became eligible for free agency in April 2008.

=== Baltimore Orioles ===
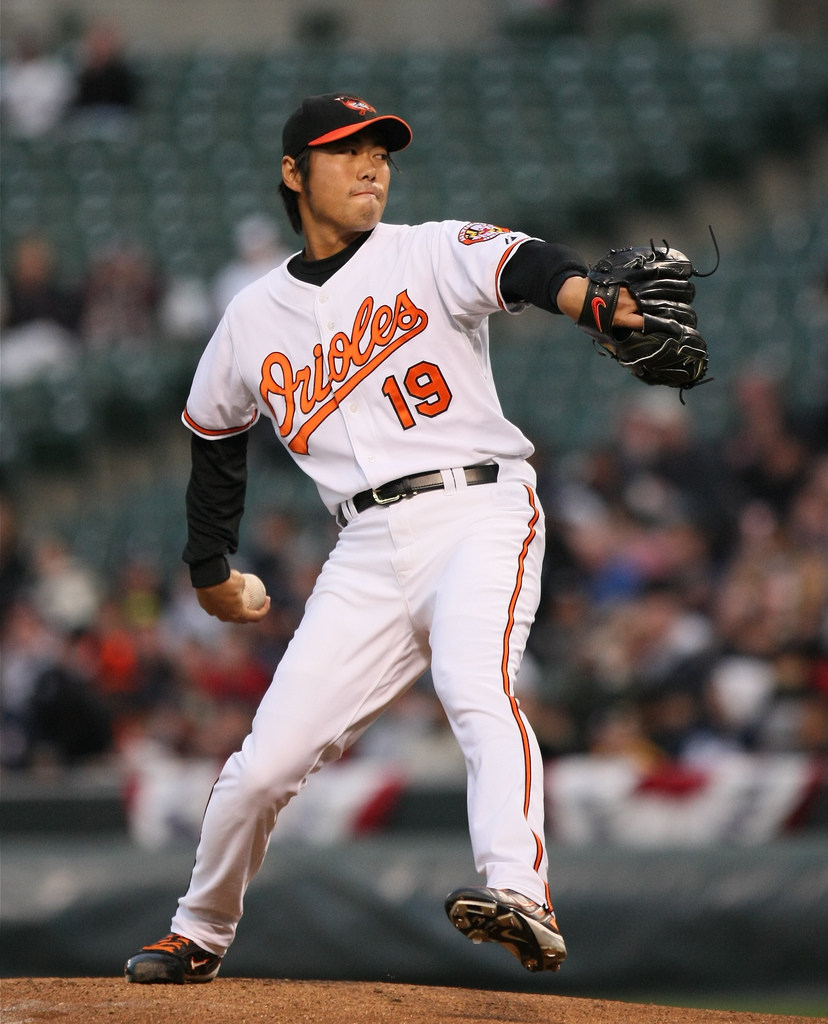
Uehara pitching for the Baltimore Orioles in 2009

On January 13, 2009, Uehara signed a two-year, $10 million deal with the Baltimore Orioles. He started the 2009 season as the number two starter behind Jeremy Guthrie. Uehara made his big league debut on April 8 against the New York Yankees. Uehara earned the win, going five innings and allowing one run. His second outing resulted in a win against the Texas Rangers.

On September 10, 2009, it was announced that Uehara would be out for the remainder of the season. He would finish his injury-plagued 2009 campaign with a 2–4 record, 4.05 ERA, and 48 strikeouts in 66 2/3 innings in 12 starts. He started the 2010 season as a setup reliever in the bullpen and finished the season 1–2 with a 2.86 ERA, 55 strikeouts in 44 innings, and 13 saves.

In the first half of the 2011 season, he was 1–1 with a 1.72 ERA and 62 strikeouts in 47 innings pitched.

=== Texas Rangers ===
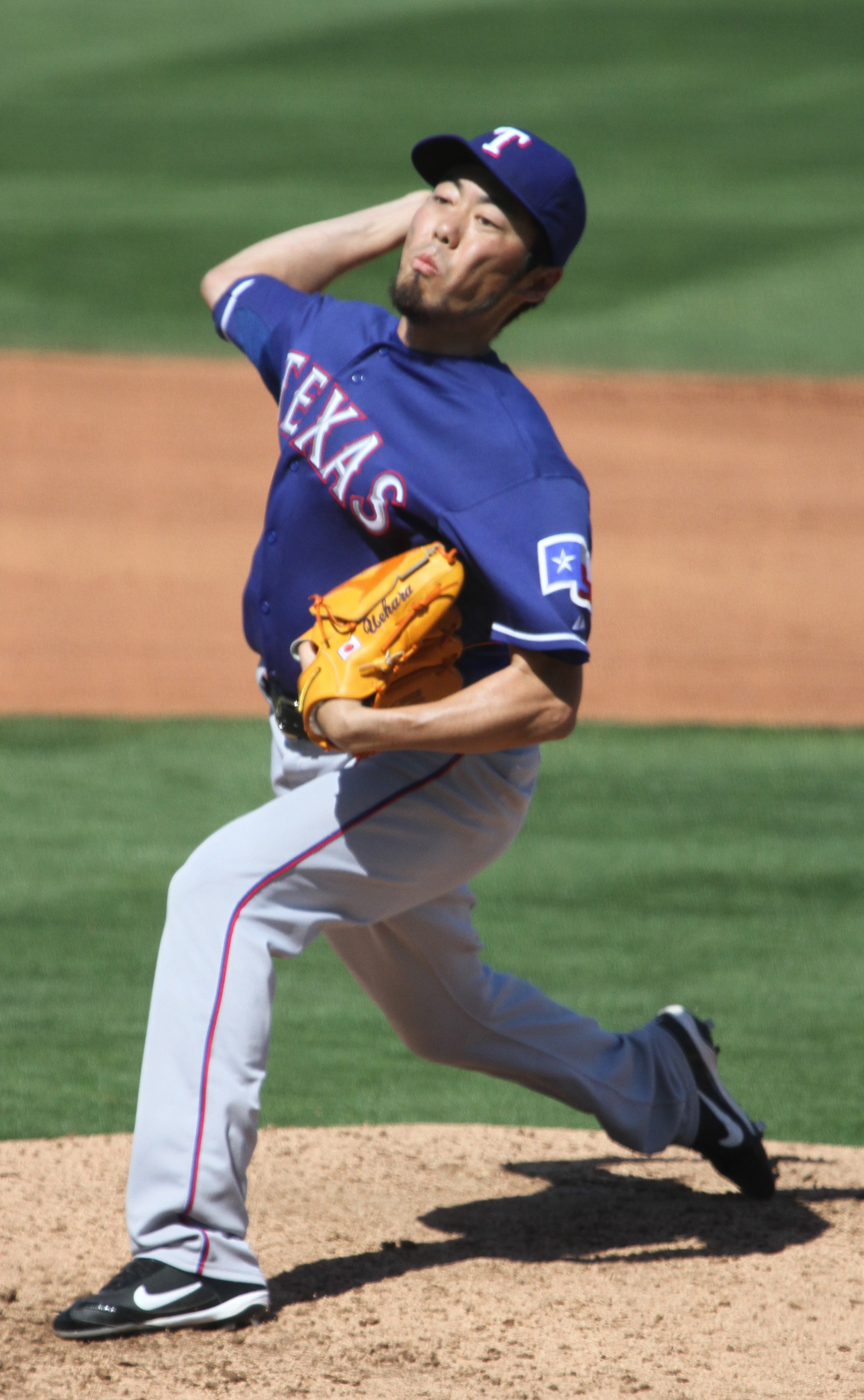
Uehara with the Texas Rangers in 2012

On July 30, 2011, Uehara was traded to the Texas Rangers for Chris Davis and Tommy Hunter. The move reunited him with his old high school teammate Yoshinori Tateyama. After starting the season with superb numbers for the Orioles, his second half, with the Rangers, would prove to be a rough one. He was 1–2 with a 4.00 ERA after the trade. Matters would get worse in the postseason when he gave up three home runs in 1 1/3 innings to compile a 33.75 ERA before being left off the roster for the World Series due to his ineffectiveness. He would finish 2011 with a 2–3 record, 2.35 ERA, and 85 strikeouts in 65 innings after pitching for the two different teams.

In 2012, Uehara remained with the Rangers via a vesting option. He would rebound with a successful campaign by keeping his ERA down to 1.75. However, he was limited to 36 innings in 37 games after spending some time on the disabled list with a strained lateral muscle. He became a free agent following the season.

=== Boston Red Sox ===
On December 6, 2012, Uehara agreed to a one-year contract with the Boston Red Sox. Uehara transitioned his role from setup man to closer after season-ending injuries to Andrew Bailey and Joel Hanrahan.

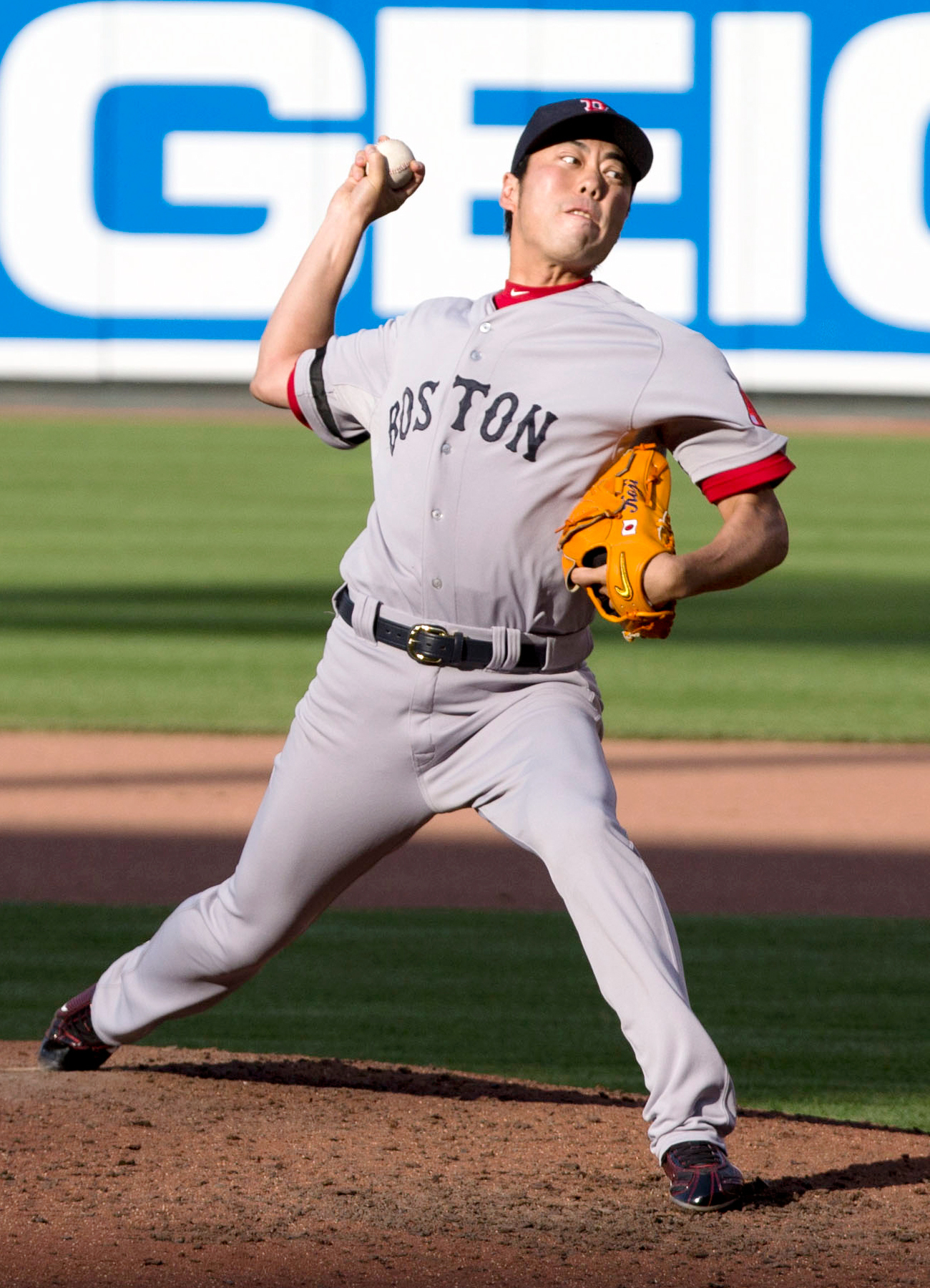
Uehara with the Boston Red Sox in 2013

In 2013, Uehara had a WHIP of 0.57 in 74 1/3 innings, setting the record for a pitcher with 50 or more innings pitched. Between July 9 and September 17, Uehara retired 37 consecutive batters, exceeding the previous franchise record of 32, and nearing Bobby Jenks' MLB record of 41 for consecutive outs by a reliever. Uehara finished the regular season with a 1.09 ERA, 21 saves, a 2.08 xFIP, and struck out 38.1% of batters he faced. He was ranked by Fangraphs as the number one reliever of 2013 in Wins Above Replacement.

Uehara pitched in five games of the 2013 ALCS, and was named ALCS Most Valuable Player. In the series he pitched 5 1/3 innings, allowing four hits and no walks, and collected nine strikeouts. He recorded a save in Game 6 to win the Red Sox their 13th AL pennant.

In Game 4 of the World Series, Uehara picked off St. Louis Cardinals pinch runner Kolten Wong for the last out of a 4–2 Red Sox win. In Game 5, he recorded his seventh save of the postseason, tying the record for most saves in a single postseason. (The next year Greg Holland matched his record for saves in the playoffs, tying John Wetteland, Robb Nen, Troy Percival, and Brad Lidge.) Uehara threw the winning pitch in the series, closing out the 6–1 win over the Cardinals in Game 6 at Fenway Park, Boston. During Boston's post-win celebrations on the field, David Ortiz playfully lifted Uehara over his shoulder after games five and six.

On July 9, 2014, Uehara was named to his first career All-Star Game, replacing injured New York Yankees pitcher Masahiro Tanaka. He struggled near the end of the 2014 regular season and was removed from the closer role on September 5. He signed a two-year extension with the Red Sox on October 30, 2014, after finishing the regular season with a 6–5 record, 2.52 ERA, 80 strikeouts in 64 1/3 innings, and 26 saves in 31 opportunities as the Red Sox failed to defend its title by finishing with a subpar 71–91 record. Uehara returned to the closer position in the 2015 season, but on August 7, he suffered a season-ending injury when a batted ball struck his right wrist. He would prematurely end his 2015 campaign with a 2–4 record added by a 2.23 ERA, 47 strikeouts in 40 1/3 innings, and 25 saves in 27 attempts as the Red Sox failed to reach the .500 mark for the 2nd season in a row. In 2016, Uehara finished the regular season with a 2–3 record, a 3.45 ERA, 63 strikeouts in 47 innings, and 7 saves after spending some time on the disabled list with a pectoral strain. His team would make the postseason for the first time since the 2013 championship season. In the 2016 ALDS, Uehara pitched 2 games without allowing a run in 2 innings but the Red Sox got swept by the Cleveland Indians in 3 games. He became a free agent following the 2016 season.

=== Chicago Cubs ===
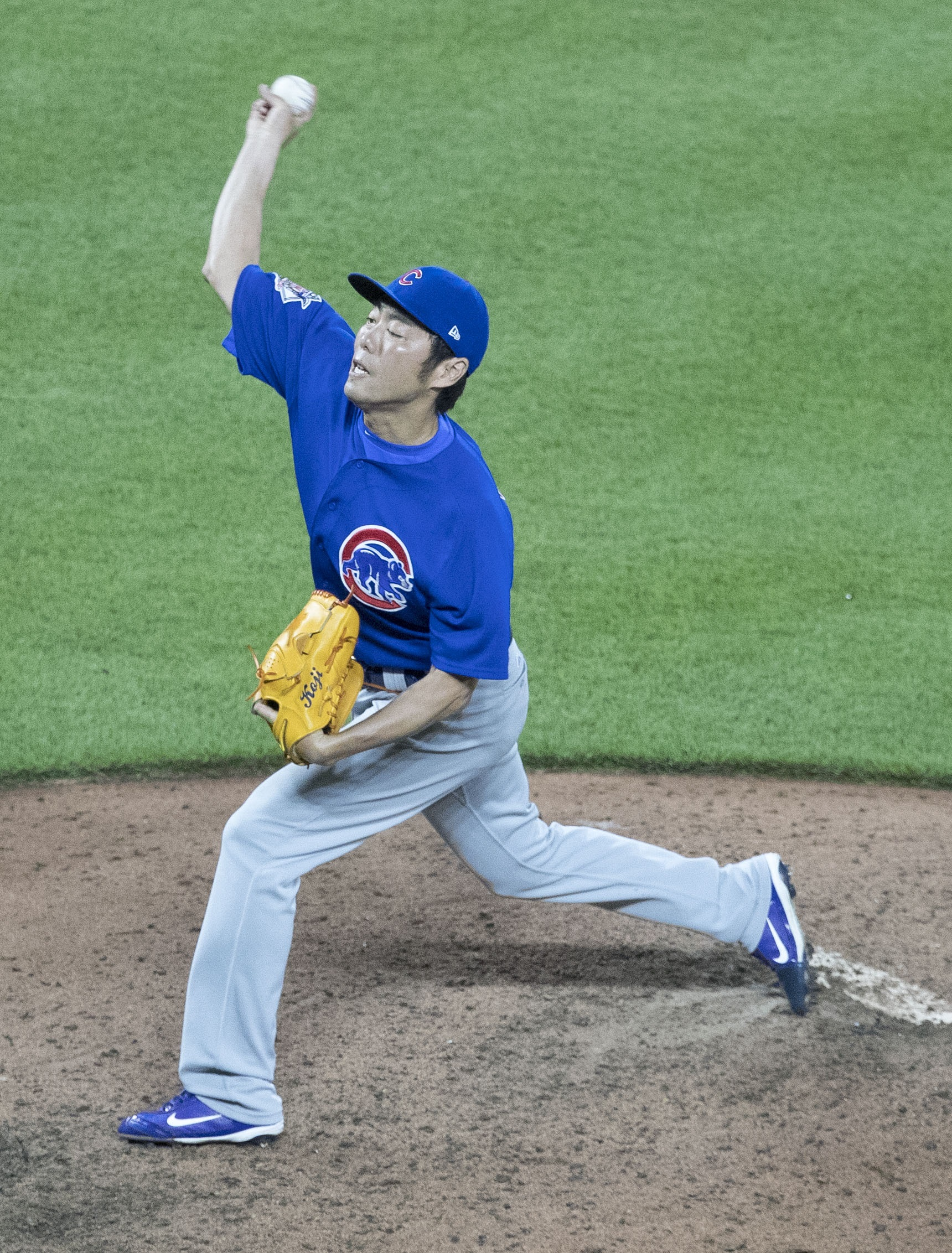
Uehara pitching for the Chicago Cubs in 2017

On December 14, 2016, Uehara agreed to a one-year contract with the Chicago Cubs for $6 million. He became a free agent following the 2017 season.

=== Second stint with Yomiuri Giants ===
On March 9, 2018, Uehara signed a one-year contract with the Yomiuri Giants, returning to Japan for the first time since 2008. He was selected to the 2018 NPB All-Star game. On July 20, 2018, Uehara became the second pitcher in history to have 100 wins, 100 holds, and 100 saves combined between NPB and MLB. On December 14, 2018, he re-signed with the Giants. In his final season with the Giants, he finished with a 4.00 ERA through nine innings, having struck out 10 batters.

=== Retirement ===
After making nine appearances for Yomiuri in 2019, Uehara announced his retirement from professional baseball at the age of 44. Uehara finished his career having appeared in a combined 748 games across MLB and the NPB, with a combined ERA of 2.93, 1,989 strikeouts, 134 wins, and 128 saves. He finished his career as MLB's all-time leader in strikeout-to-walk ratio among qualifying relievers, posting a 7.33 K/BB over his nine years in MLB.

== International career ==
Uehara participated in international events since he was in University, he also participated in the Olympic Games twice, as well as the first World Baseball Classic, and participated in Asian Baseball Championships. He has 12 wins and 2 saves, without a loss in his 25 appearances from the above events.

He was a member of the Japanese national baseball team which competed in the 2004 Olympic Games in Athens. The team eventually won the bronze medal.

In 2006, he joined Team Japan for the World Baseball Classic and earned 2 wins, improving his unbeaten record in international competition (including amateur appearances) to 12 wins in 21 appearances. In the World Baseball Classic, Japan beat Cuba to win the championship; Uehara led the tournament with 16 strikeouts. He was a closer in 2007 Asian Baseball Championships, played in two games and earned his first international save against Korea.

Uehara moved to another team in April 2008. He remained in the 39-out-of-77 men candidate list towards the Beijing Olympics in late June, and was selected to the final 24-men list in mid-July. He was expected to be a setup pitcher before the Olympic Games, but he appeared as a closer in his first appearance against Chinese Taipei, pitching a shutout inning without yielding a hit, as his team won 6–1. He earned his first Olympic save against Canada, holding a 1–0 victory two days later. Japan finished fourth in the Games. Uehara chose not to participate in the 2009 World Baseball Classic.

== Personal life ==
Uehara is a friend of former MLB pitcher Roger Clemens; they first met when Clemens visited Japan in 2004 MLB Japan All-Star Series. MLB.com featured a video in which Clemens gave Uehara a signed, game-used glove.

Uehara married his wife, Miho, in 2004. During his MLB career, Uehara lived with his family in Baltimore, where he said there were better educational opportunities for his son, Kazuma.
