= Toshihiro Noguchi =

Japanese baseball player (born 1971)

Toshihiro Noguchi 野口 寿浩
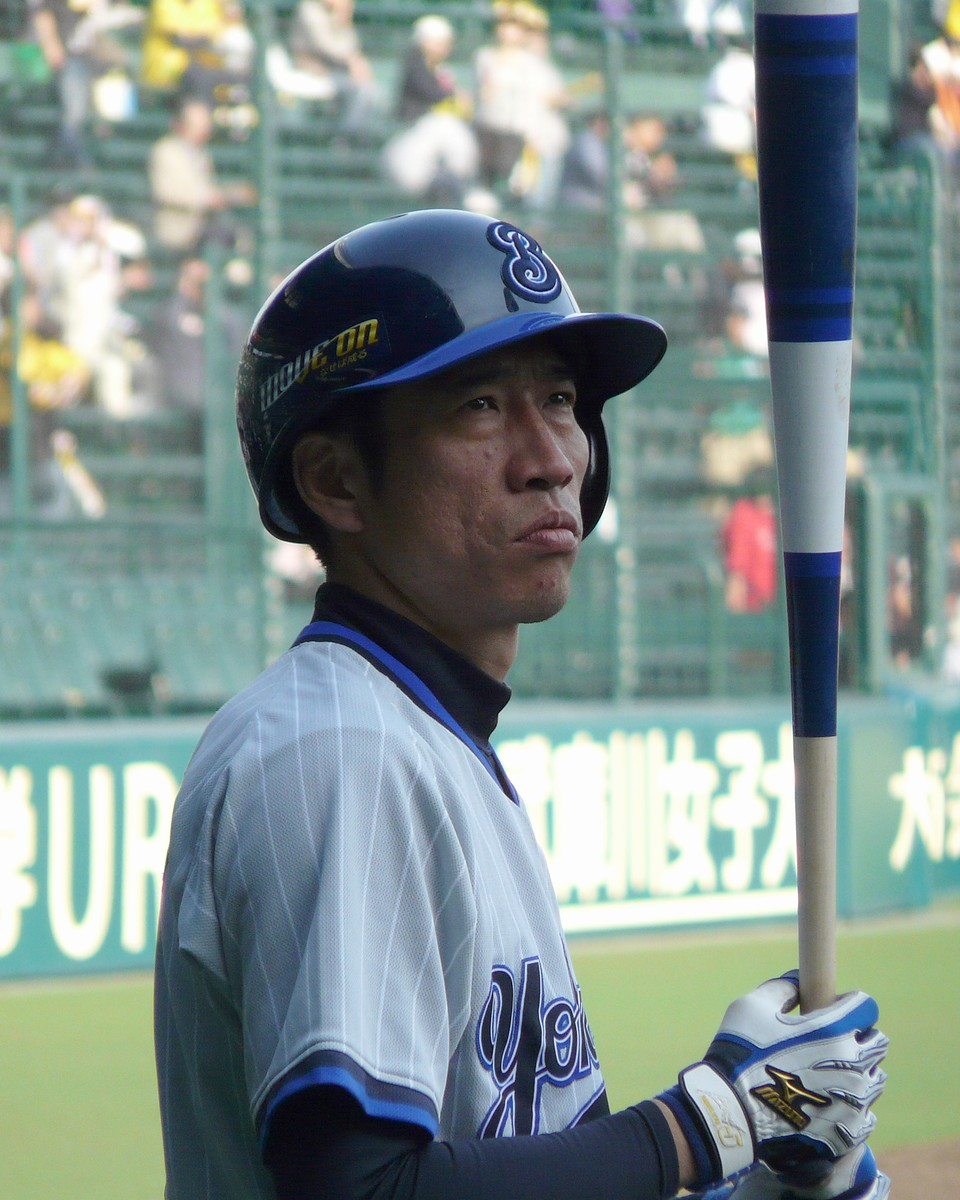
- Catcher / Catching coach
- Born: June 24, 1971 (age 54); Narashino, Chiba
- Batted: Right Threw: Right

NPB debut
- October 13, 1991, for the Yakult Swallows

Last appearance
- June 30, 2010, for the Yokohama BayStars

NPB statistics
- Batting average: .250
- On-base percentage: .294
- Slugging percentage: .377

Teams
- As player: Yakult Swallows (1990–1997); Nippon-Ham Fighters (1998–2002); Hanshin Tigers (2003–2008); Yokohama BayStars (2009–2010); As coach: Tokyo Yakult Swallows (2017–2018)
- Last updated on: 7 January 2019

Toshihiro Noguchi (野口 寿浩, Noguchi Toshihiro; born June 24, 1971) is a Japanese professional baseball catcher and coach. He played in Nippon Professional Baseball from 1991 to 2010. He was a catching coach for the Tokyo Yakult Swallows.
