= Kanei Kobayashi =

Japanese baseball player and coach

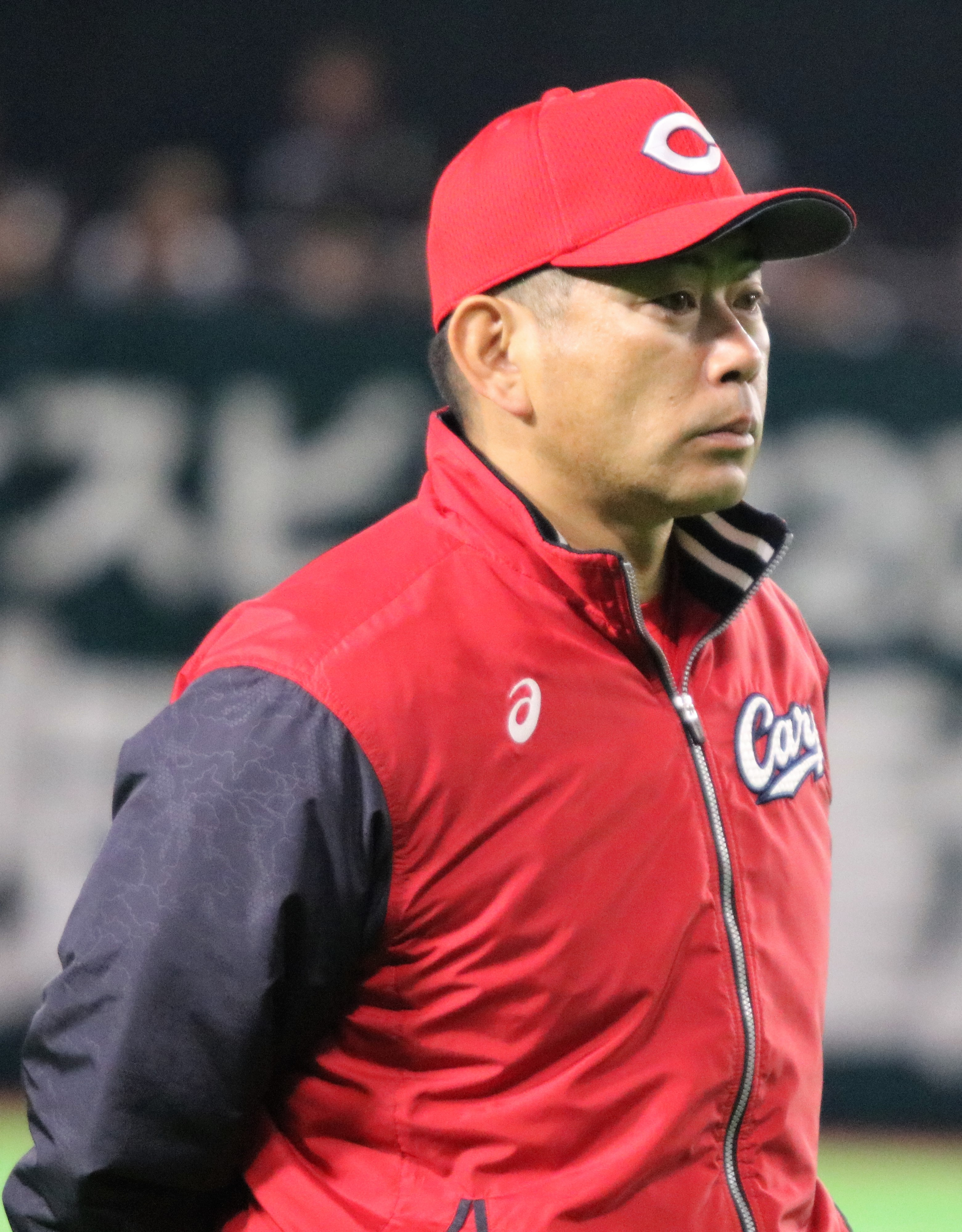

Hiroshima Toyo Carp – No. 73
- Pitcher / Coach
- Born: January 29, 1974 (age 51); Hiroshima, Japan
- Batted: Right Threw: Right

NPB debut
- April 3, 1998, for the Hiroshima Toyo Carp

Last NPB appearance
- October 17, 2005, for the Hiroshima Toyo Carp

NPB statistics (through 2005)
- Win–loss record: 19-22
- Saves: 29
- ERA: 3.90
- Strikeouts: 356

Teams
- As player: Hiroshima Toyo Carp (1998–2005); As coach: Hiroshima Toyo Carp (2006–present)

Career highlights and awards
- 1× NPB All-Star (1998)

Kanei Kobayashi (小林 幹英, Kobayashi Kanei; born June 29, 1974) is a professional Japanese baseball player.
