= Kazuya Tabata =

Japanese baseball player, coach, and manager

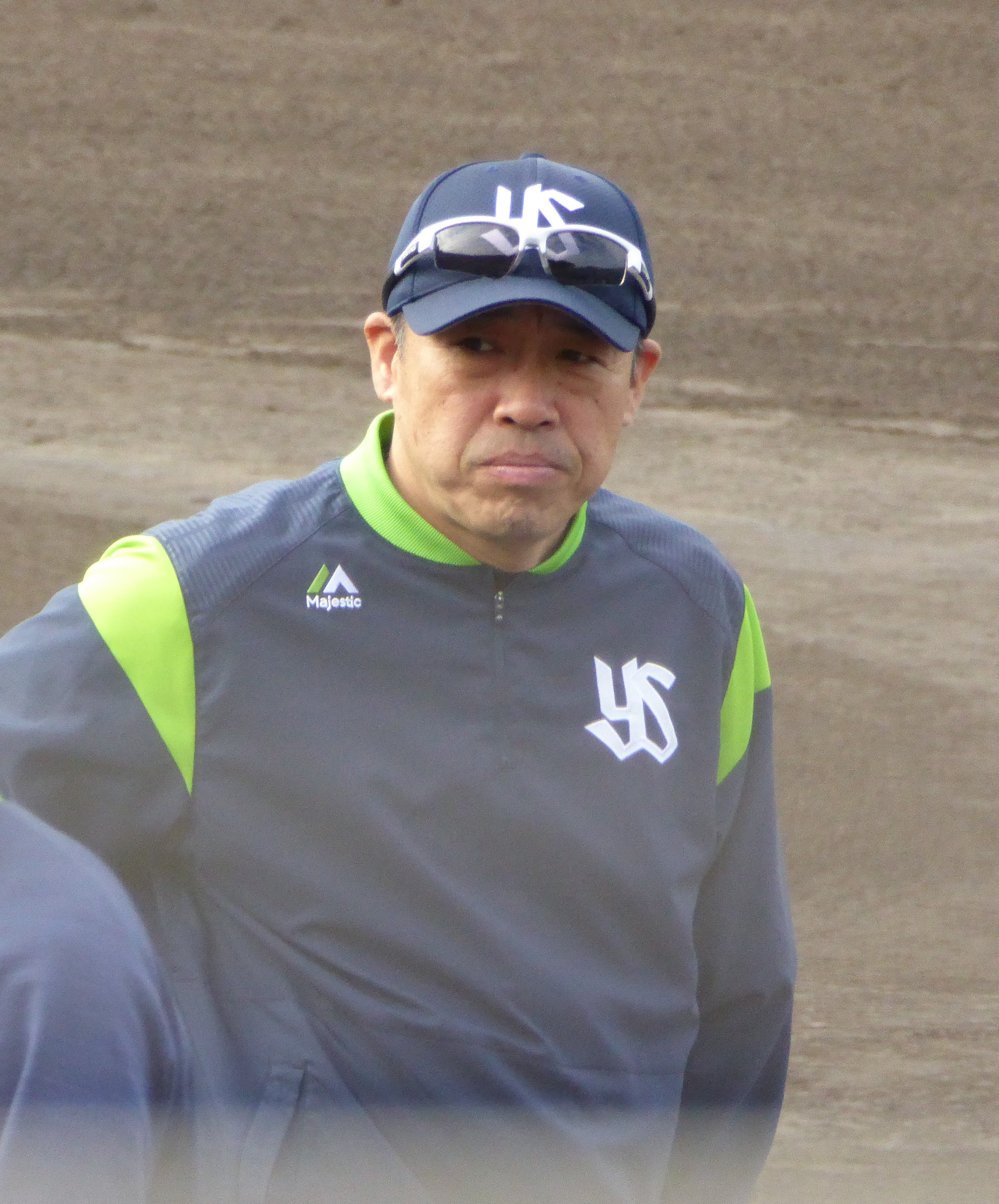
- Pitcher / Coach / Manager
- Born: February 27, 1969; Takaoka, Toyama
- Batted: Right Threw: Right

NPB debut
- April 11, 1993, for the Fukuoka Daiei Hawks

Last appearance
- September 27, 2001, for the Yomiuri Giants

NPB statistics
- Win–loss record: 37–36
- Earned run average: 4.14
- Strikeouts: 376

Teams
- As player: Fukuoka Daiei Hawks (1993–1995); Yakult Swallows (1996–1999); Osaka Kintetsu Buffaloes (2000); Yomiuri Giants (2001); As manager: Toyama GRN Thunderbirds (2020); As coach: Yomiuri Giants (2012–2017); Tokyo Yakult Swallows (2018–2019)

Career highlights and awards
- 1× Japan Series champion (1997); 2× NPB All-Star (1996, 1997)

Kazuya Tabata (田畑 一也, Tabata Kazuya; born February 27, 1969) is a retired Japanese professional baseball pitcher. He made his Nippon Professional Baseball debut in 1993 for the Fukuoka Daiei Hawks. Tabata later played for the Yakult Swallows, Osaka Kintetsu Buffaloes and Yomiuri Giants.
