= MLB Japan All-Star Series =

End-of-season tour of Japan made by an MLB All-Star team

MLB Japan All-Star Series 日米野球
- Frequency: Irregularly
- Location: Japan
- Country: United States; Canada; Japan
- Inaugurated: 1986
- Most recent: 2018
- Participants: (United States) (Canada) MLB All-Stars; NPB All-Stars (1986–2006); Samurai Japan (2014– )
- Organiser: Major League Baseball; Nippon Professional Baseball; Japan national baseball team

The MLB Japan All-Star Series is an irregular end-of-the-season tour of Japan made by an All-Star team from Major League Baseball (MLB) since 1986, contested in a best-of format against the All-Stars from Nippon Professional Baseball (NPB) or recently as of 2014 their national team Samurai Japan (SJP).

The series has featured many great players, such as Nori Aoki, Barry Bonds, Ken Griffey Jr., Randy Johnson, Chase Utley, Ryan Howard, Hideki Matsui, Ichiro Suzuki, Shinnosuke Abe, David Ortiz, Sammy Sosa, Justin Morneau, Joe Mauer, David Wright, Jose Reyes, Jose Altuve, Robinson Canó and Manny Ramírez.

In the beginning of all games the American, Canadian and Japanese national anthems are all played. Games can end in a tie if it persists through 12 innings, just as in NPB rules.

== List of series ==
=== MLB vs. NPB (1986–2006) ===
Year	Format	MLB All-Stars Won	NPB All-Stars Won (1986–98 as All-Japan)	Tied	Most Valuable Player
1986	Best-of-7	6 Games	1 Game	0 Games	Tony Peña (MLB)
1988	Best-of-7	3 Games	2 Games	2 Games	Barry Larkin (MLB)
1990	Best-of-8	3 Games	4 Games	1 Game	Ken Griffey Jr. (MLB)
1992	Best-of-8	6 Games	1 Game	1 Game	Mark Grace (MLB)
1994	Cancelled (due to the MLB players strike)				
1996	Best-of-8	4 Games	2 Games	2 Games	Steve Finley (MLB)
1998	Best-of-8	6 Games	2 Games	0 Games	Sammy Sosa (MLB)
2000	Best-of-8	5 Games	2 Games	1 Game	Barry Bonds (MLB)
2002	Best-of-8	5 Games	3 Games	0 Games	Torii Hunter (MLB)
2004	Best-of-8	5 Games	3 Games	0 Games	Vernon Wells (MLB)
2006	Best-of-5	5 Games	0 Games	0 Games	Ryan Howard (MLB)
Total	MLB 9–1 NPB	48 Games	20 Games	7 Games	MLB 10–0 NPB

=== MLB vs. SJP (2014, 2018) ===
The Japan All-Star Series was resumed in 2014 after an eight-year break. It was the outcome of discussions and attempts to realize the Global World Series. Katsuhiko Kumazaki, then the new Commissioner of NPB, decided to field the national team Samurai Japan, instead of a NPB All-Star line-up, for the 2014 series. Kumazaki saw in this series a big opportunity for the Japanese team to gain hugely useful experience for the 2017 World Baseball Classic. Samurai Japan won the best-of-five series by a margin of three games to two. Particularly noteworthy was a combined no-hitter by Samurai Japan in Game 3 as their pitchers shut out the MLB All-Stars 4–0.

On May 1, 2018, MLB announced that it would send again an All-Star team to tour Japan after the end of current season, with six games scheduled against the Japan national team from November 9 to 15.

Year	Format	MLB All-Stars Won	Samurai Japan Won	Tied	Most Valuable Player
2014	Best-of-5	2 Games	3 Games	0 Games	Yuki Yanagita (SJP)
2018	Best-of-6	1 Game	5 Games	0 Games	
Total	MLB 0–2 SJP	3 Games	8 Games	0 Games	MLB 0–1 SJP

== See also ==
- List of Major League Baseball games played outside the United States and Canada
- MLB Tokyo Series 2025
