= Kazuhiko Ushijima =

Japanese baseball player and manager

- Pitcher / Manager
- Born: April 13, 1961 (age 65); Kawai, Nara, Japan
- Batted: Right Threw: Right

NPB debut
- August 24, 1980, for the Chunichi Dragons

Last NPB appearance
- August 18, 1993, for the Chiba Lotte Marines

NPB statistics (through 1993)
- Win–loss record: 53-64
- Saves: 126
- ERA: 3.26
- Strikeouts: 746
- Stats at Baseball Reference

Teams
- As player: Chunichi Dragons (1980–1986); Lotte Orions/Chiba Lotte Marines (1987–1993); As manager: Yokohama BayStars (2005–2006)

Career highlights and awards
- 5× NPB All-Star (1983–1984, 1987–1989)
- Last updated on: 3 November 2014

Kazuhiko Ushijima (牛島 和彦, Ushijima Kazuhiko; born April 13, 1961 in Kawai, Nara, Japan) is a former Nippon Professional Baseball pitcher.
