= Atsushi Kataoka =

Japanese baseball player and coach (born 1969)

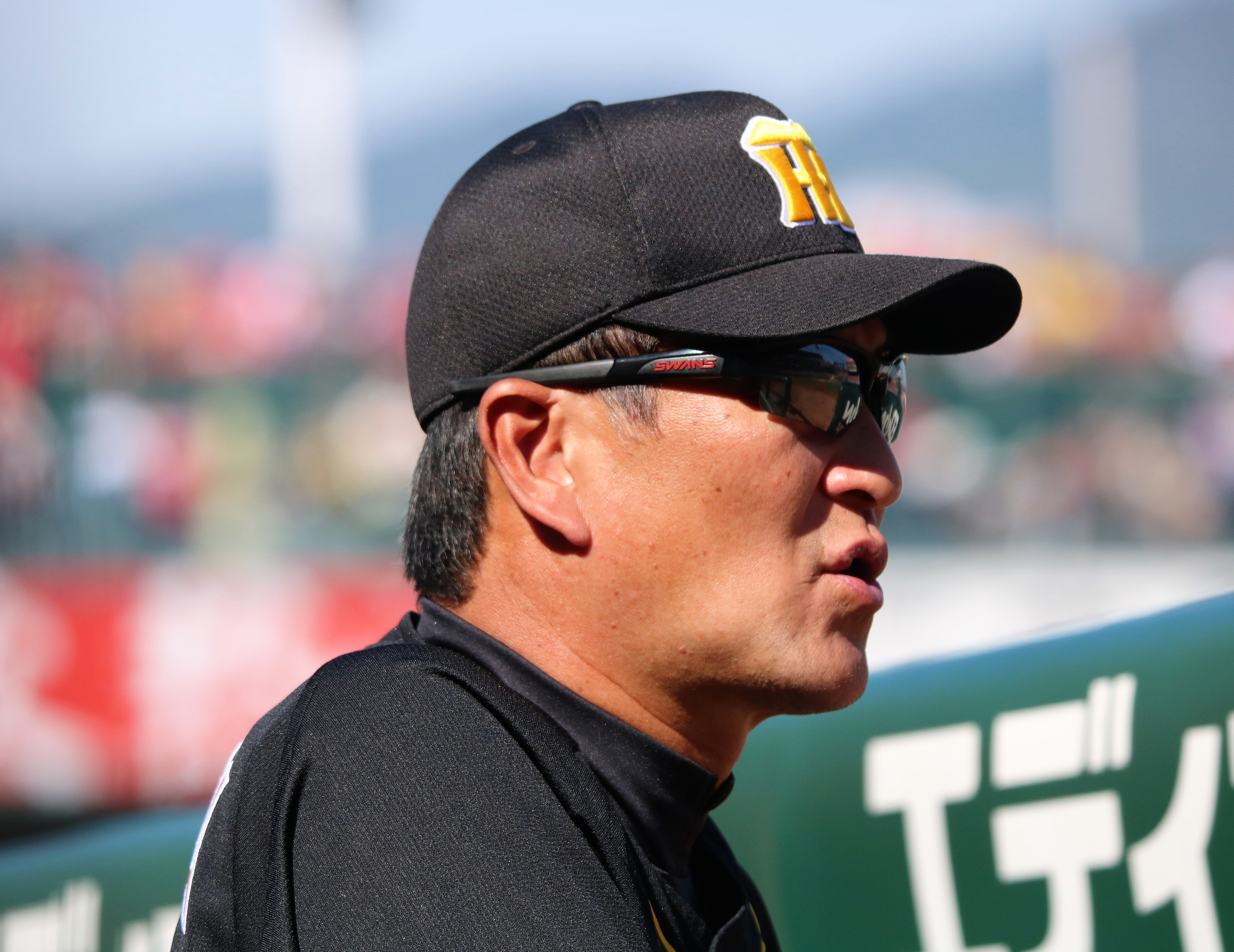
- Infielder / Coach
- Born: June 27, 1969 (age 56); Kumiyama, Kyoto, Japan
- Batted: Left Threw: Right

NPB debut
- April 4, 1992, for the Nippon Ham Fighters

Last NPB appearance
- October 12, 2006, for the Hanshin Tigers

NPB statistics (through 2006)
- Batting average: .270
- Home runs: 164
- Hits: 1425

Teams
- As player: Nippon Ham Fighters (1992–2001); Hanshin Tigers (2002–2006); As coach: Hanshin Tigers (2010–2012, 2016–2018); Chunichi Dragons (2022-2024)

Career highlights and awards
- 6× NPB All-Star (1993, 1997-2000, 2002); 2× Central League Best Nine Award (1996, 1998); 3× Central League Golden Glove Award (1996-1998); 1× Golden Spirit Award (2000)
- Last updated on: 24 December 2024

Atsushi Kataoka (片岡 篤史, Kataoka Atsushi; born June 27, 1969) is a former Nippon Professional Baseball infielder. He is the current farm manager for the Chunichi Dragons.
