= Motoyuki Akahori =

Japanese baseball player, coach, and manager

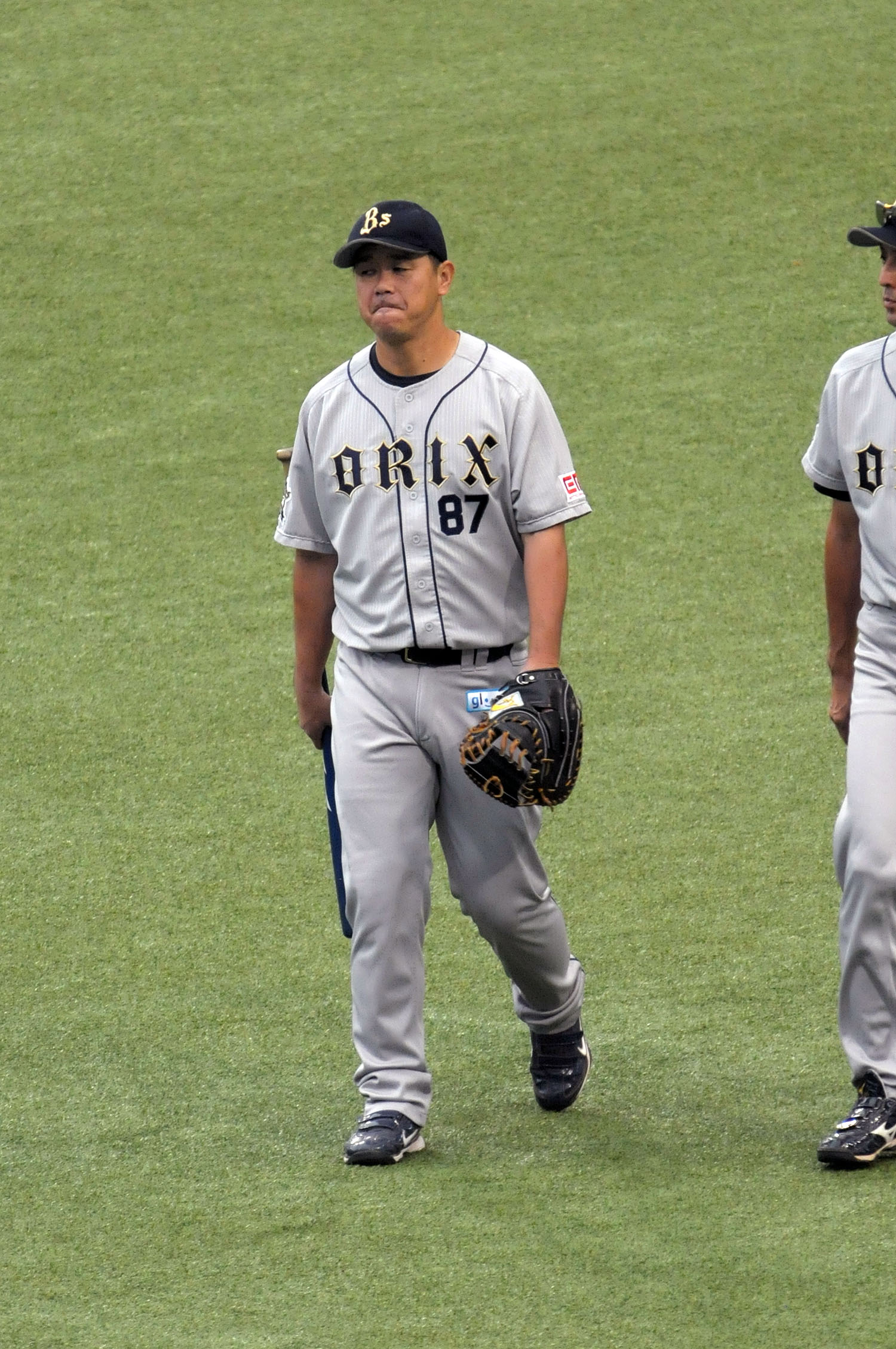

Kufu HAYATE Ventures Shizuoka – No. 19
- Pitching Coach/Pitcher
- Born: April 7, 1970 (age 56); Shizuoka, Japan
- Batted: Right Threw: Right

debut
- May 3, 1989, for the Kintetsu Buffaloes

Last appearance
- September 24, 2004, for the Osaka Kintetsu Buffaloes

NPB statistics
- Win–loss: 58–45
- ERA: 2.88
- Strikeouts: 590
- Saves: 139

Teams
- As player: Kintetsu Buffaloes/Osaka Kintetsu Buffaloes (1989 – 2004); As coach: Orix Buffaloes (2005 – 2009, 2011 – 2014) (pitching); Tokyo Yakult Swallows (2017 – 2018) (pitching); Chunichi Dragons (2019 – 2021); As manager: Niigata Albirex Baseball Club (2015 – 2016)

Motoyuki Akahori (赤堀 元之, Akahori Motoyuki; born in Shizuoka, Japan) is a retired Nippon Professional Baseball player. He was formerly with the Osaka Kintetsu Buffaloes. Currently, he was most recently the first team pitching coach of the Chunichi Dragons.
