= 2002 Nippon Professional Baseball season =

2002 NPB season
- League: Nippon Professional Baseball
- Sport: Baseball

Regular season
- Season MVP: CL: Hideki Matsui (YOM); PL: Alex Cabrera (SEI)

League postseason
- CL champions: Yomiuri Giants
- CL runners-up: Chunichi Dragons
- PL champions: Seibu Lions
- PL runners-up: Osaka Kintetsu Buffaloes; Fukuoka Daiei Hawks

Japan Series
- Champions: Yomiuri Giants
- Runners-up: Seibu Lions
- Finals MVP: Tomohiro Nioka (Yomiuri Giants)

NPB seasons
- ← 2001 2003 →

The 2002 Nippon Professional Baseball season ended with the Yomiuri Giants defeating the Seibu Lions in the 2002 Japan Series 4 games to 0.

== Standings ==
=== Central League ===
Central League	G	W	L	T	Pct.	GB
Yomiuri Giants	140	86	52	2	.623	-
Yakult Swallows	140	74	62	4	.544	11.0
Chunichi Dragons	140	69	66	5	.511	15.5
Hanshin Tigers	140	66	70	4	.485	19.0
Hiroshima Toyo Carp	140	64	72	4	.471	21.0
Yokohama BayStars	140	49	86	5	.363	35.5

=== Pacific League ===
Pacific League	G	W	L	T	Pct.	GB
Seibu Lions	140	90	49	1	.647	-
Osaka Kintetsu Buffaloes	140	73	65	2	.529	16.5
Fukuoka Daiei Hawks	140	73	65	2	.529	16.5
Chiba Lotte Marines	140	67	72	1	.482	23.0
Nippon-Ham Fighters	140	61	76	3	.445	28.0
Orix BlueWave	140	50	87	3	.365	39.0

== Japan Series ==
Game	Score	Date	Location	Attendance
1	Giants – 4, Lions – 1	October 26	Tokyo Dome	45,107
2	Giants – 9, Lions – 4	October 27	Tokyo Dome	45,223
3	Lions – 2, Giants – 10	October 29	Seibu Dome	30,933
4	Lions – 2, Giants – 6	October 30	Seibu Dome	31,072

== League leaders ==
=== Central League ===
Batting leaders
Stat	Player	Team	Total
Batting average	Kosuke Fukudome	Chunichi Dragons	.343
Home runs	Hideki Matsui	Yomiuri Giants	50
Runs batted in	Hideki Matsui	Yomiuri Giants	107
Hits	Takayuki Shimizu	Yomiuri Giants	191
Stolen bases	Norihiro Akahoshi	Hanshin Tigers	26

Pitching leaders
Stat	Player	Team	Total
Wins	Koji Uehara; Kevin Hodges	Yomiuri Giants; Yakult Swallows	17
Earned run average	Masumi Kuwata	Yomiuri Giants	2.22
Strikeouts	Kei Igawa	Hanshin Tigers	206
Saves	Eddie Gaillard	Chunichi Dragons	35

== See also ==
- 2002 Major League Baseball season
