= Hiromasa Arai =

Japanese baseball player and coach (born 1952)

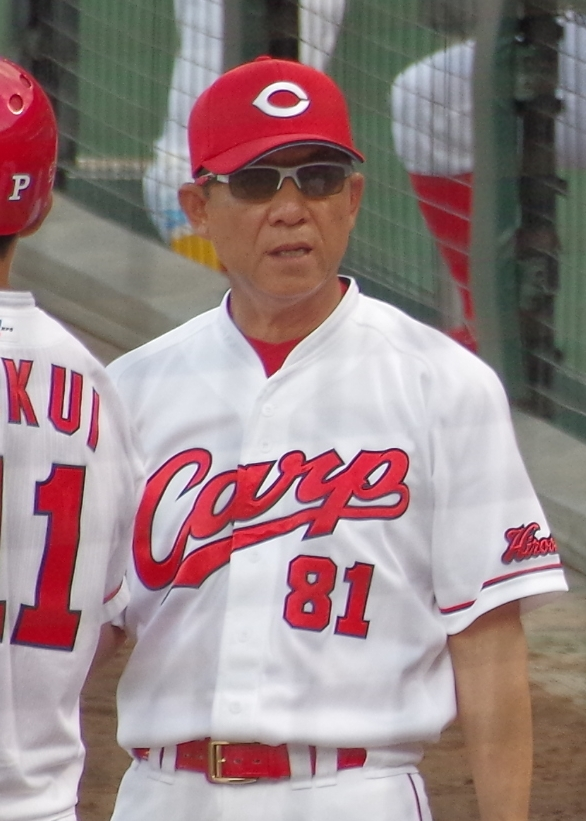
- Outfielder / Coach
- Born: April 26, 1952; Osaka, Osaka, Japan
- Batted: Left Threw: Right

NPB debut
- July 25, 1975, for the Nankai Hawks

Last appearance
- October 10, 1992, for the Kintetsu Buffaloes

NPB statistics (through 1992)
- Batting average: .291
- Hits: 2038
- Home runs: 88
- Runs batted in: 680
- Stolen base: 165
- Stats at Baseball Reference

Teams
- As player: Nankai Hawks (1975–1985); Kintetsu Buffaloes (1986–1992); As coach: Orix BlueWave (1994–2001); Fukuoka Daiei Hawks (2003–2004); Orix Buffaloes (2005–2006, 2010–2012); Fukuoka SoftBank Hawks (2007–2008, 2019–2020); Hiroshima Toyo Carp (2013–2015)

Hiromasa Arai (新井 宏昌, Arai Hiromasa; born April 26, 1952) is a Japanese former Nippon Professional Baseball outfielder.

== See also ==
- List of Nippon Professional Baseball career hits leaders
