= Nobuyuki Hoshino =

Japanese baseball player and coach

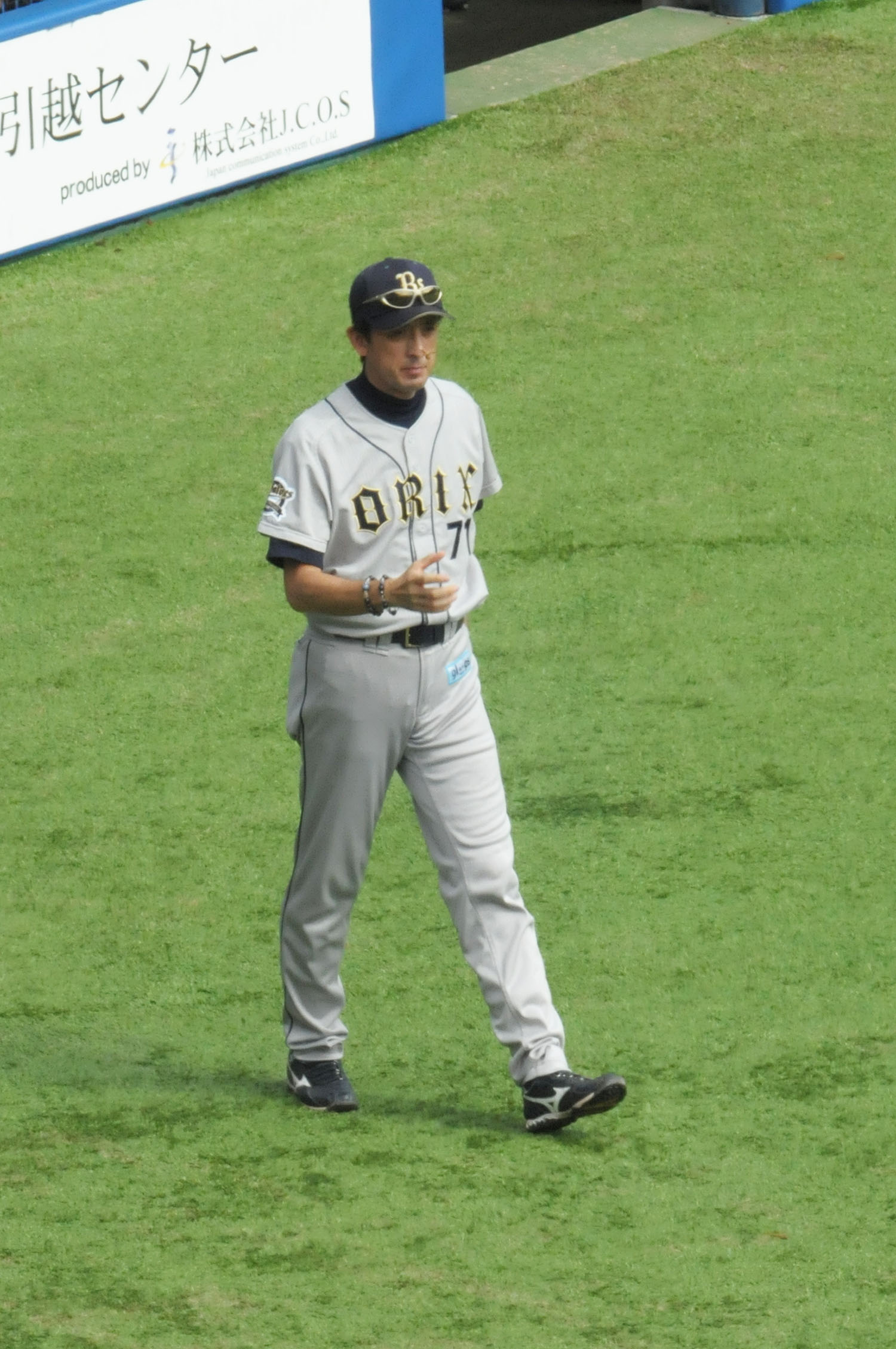
- Pitcher / Coach
- Born: January 31, 1966 (age 60); Asahikawa, Hokkaido, Japan
- Batted: Left Threw: Left

NPB debut
- July 9, 1985, for the Hankyu Braves

Last NPB appearance
- October 14, 2002, for the Hanshin Tigers

NPB statistics (through 2002)
- Win–loss record: 176-140
- Saves: 2
- ERA: 3.64
- Strikeouts: 2041
- Stats at Baseball Reference

Teams
- As player: Hankyu Braves/Orix Braves/Orix BlueWave (1984–1999); Hanshin Tigers (2000–2002); As coach: Hanshin Tigers (2006–2009); Orix Buffaloes (2010–2017)

Career highlights and awards
- 1× Japan Series champion (1996); 7× NPB All-Star (1987–1989, 1991, 1995–1997)
- Last updated on: 17 December 2017

Nobuyuki Hoshino (星野 伸之, Hoshino Nobuyuki; born January 31, 1966 in Asahikawa, Hokkaido, Japan) is a Japanese former Nippon Professional Baseball pitcher.

== See also ==
- List of top Nippon Professional Baseball strikeout pitchers
