= Katsuhito Mizuno =

Japanese baseball player

- Pitcher / Coach
- Born: September 3, 1965 (age 60)
- Batted: Right Threw: Right

NPB debut
- May 22, 1984, for the Yomiuri Giants

Last appearance
- October 22, 1996, for the Yomiuri Giants

NPB statistics
- Win–loss record: 39-29
- ERA: 3.10
- Strikeouts: 519
- Stats at Baseball Reference

Teams
- As player: Yomiuri Giants (1984–1996); As coach: Yomiuri Giants (1999–2001, 2019–2020)

Career highlights and awards
- NPB All-Star (1988)

Katsuhito Mizuno (水野 雄仁, Mizuno Katsuhito; born September 3, 1965) is a Japanese retired professional baseball pitcher.
