= Takuro Ishii =

Japanese baseball player (born 1970)

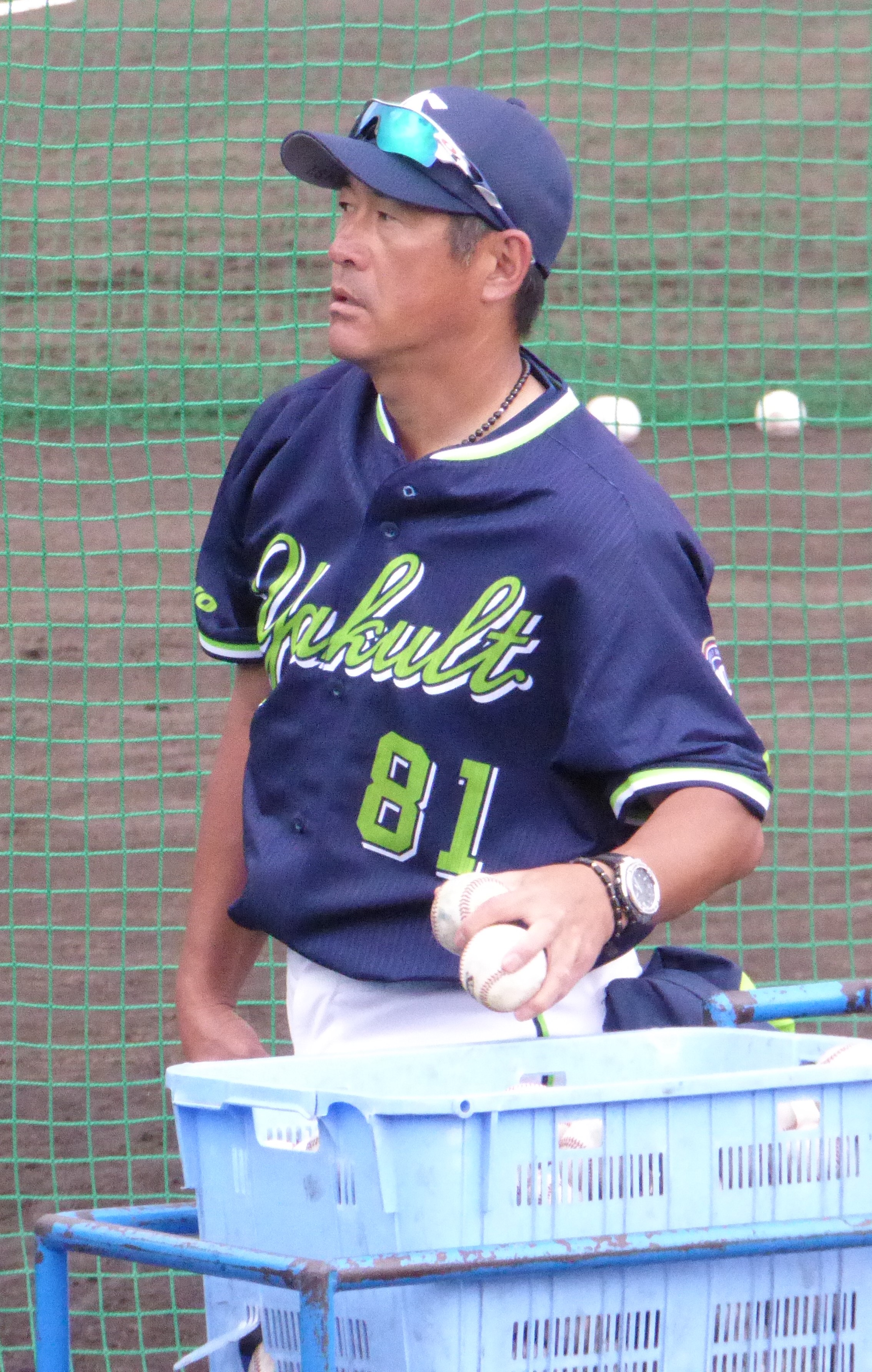

Yomiuri Giants
- Third baseman, Shortstop, Coach
- Born: August 25, 1970 (age 56); Sano, Tochigi, Japan
- Batted: Left Threw: Right

debut
- April 13, 1989, for the Yokohama Taiyo Whales

Last appearance
- 2012, for the Hiroshima Toyo Carp

Career statistics
- Batting average: .282
- Home runs: 102
- Hits: 2,432
- Stolen bases: 358
- Stats at Baseball Reference

Teams
- As player: Yokohama Taiyō Whales/Yokohama BayStars (1989–2008); Hiroshima Toyo Carp (2009–2012); As coach: Hiroshima Toyo Carp (2013–2017); Tokyo Yakult Swallows (2018–2019); Yomiuri Giants (2020–2021, 2026–present); Yokohama DeNA BayStars (2022–2025)

Career highlights and awards
- Japan Series champion (1998); 6-time All-Star; 5× Best Nine Award (1997–2001); 4-time Gold Glove winner; member of Meikyukai

Takuro Ishii (石井 琢朗, Ishii Takurō; born August 25, 1970 in Sano, Tochigi, Japan) is a retired Japanese professional baseball player. He currently is a coach for the Yokohama DeNA BayStars. He batted left-handed and threw right-handed.

Ishii was regarded as one of the best Japanese shortstops of the late 1990s and early 2000s. Though late in his career his stats declined due to age, he still contributed with his precise fielding and solid batting abilities, as well as his veteran leadership.

Ishii entered the professional leagues with the Yokohama Taiyo Whales, and played with the franchise for most of his career. (The team changed its name to the Yokohama BayStars in 1993.)

== Biography ==
Ishii joined the Yokohama Taiyo Whales from outside the draft in 1988. His uniform number was 66. He played as a pitcher during his early career, and marked his first professional victory in 1989. He also got a hit in his first victory. Ishii compiled a record of 1-4, with a 5.69 ERA in his three years as a pitcher.

Ishii converted to the infield in 1992. He became the team's regular third baseman the same year. The team changed its name to the Yokohama BayStars in 1993, and Ishii changed his uniform number to 0. He played a full season at third base, batting second. He won the Central League Golden Glove award and led the league in steals. He changed his number to 5 in 1994.

He played in the All-Star Game for the first time in 1995. He switched from third base to shortstop in 1996. He was an all-star for five consecutive seasons from 1997 to 2001.

Ishii began to bat lead-off in 1997. He received a Best Nine Award as the best shortstop in the Central League in 1997. He would receive this award for five consecutive years, until 2001. The Yokohama Baystars won the Central League pennant, as well as the Japan Championship Series in 1998 (38 years after their last championship in 1960). Ishii led the league in steals and hits, and received his fourth Golden Glove award at shortstop. He led the league in steals for three consecutive seasons (1998~2000).

In 1999 he marked 1,000 career hits, 1,000 games played, and 200 career steals. During a slump in 2000, Ishii replied to a question by implying the slump was not solely on the players; a day later, he came out with a buzzcut haircut. Ishii led the league in hits for the second time in his career in 2001. He won his fifth and final Best Nine Award that year.

Ishii went into a huge slump in 2003, getting fewer than 100 hits in a season for the first time since 1992. He reversed his slump in 2004, matching his career high in home runs.

He started every single game in 2005, batting first and playing shortstop. He also played in every inning. In 2006, he played in every inning of all 146 season games for the second year in a row. He also tied his career high for single-season hits.

Ishii got his 2,000th career hit on May 11, 2006, in his first at-bat against the Tohoku Rakuten Golden Eagles. He was the 34th player in Japanese baseball — and the second player who has a win as a pitcher — to reach the milestone. As a result, he automatically became a member of Meikyukai, one of the two Japanese baseball halls of fame.

Ishii had knee surgery during the 2006 off-season, and was removed from a game on April 1, ending his full-inning play record at 339 games (second most among active players).

After spending 19 seasons with the Whales/BayStars, Ishii moved to the Hiroshima Toyo Carp in 2009. After retiring following the 2012 season, he became a coach for the Carp.

== Personal life ==
Ishii's wife is FujiTV announcer Shiori Arase. He has two children, born in 2002 and 2005. His former wife is Azusa Senou, who was a member of CoCo. They were married from 1996 to 2000, but she left him because he frequently cheated on her with other women. One famous example occurred in 2000 when well-known NHK announcer Yumiko Udo was photographed coming out of Takuro's apartment in the early hours of the morning disguised wearing a wig.

His daughter is professional tennis player Sayaka Ishii.

== Awards ==
- Best Nine Award: 1997~2001 (shortstop)
- Golden Glove Award: 1993~1995 (third base), 1998 (shortstop)
- All-Star: 1995, 1997–2001
- 2000th hit: May 11, 2006

== See also ==
- List of Nippon Professional Baseball career hits leaders
