= Toshihisa Nishi =

Japanese baseball player (born 1971)

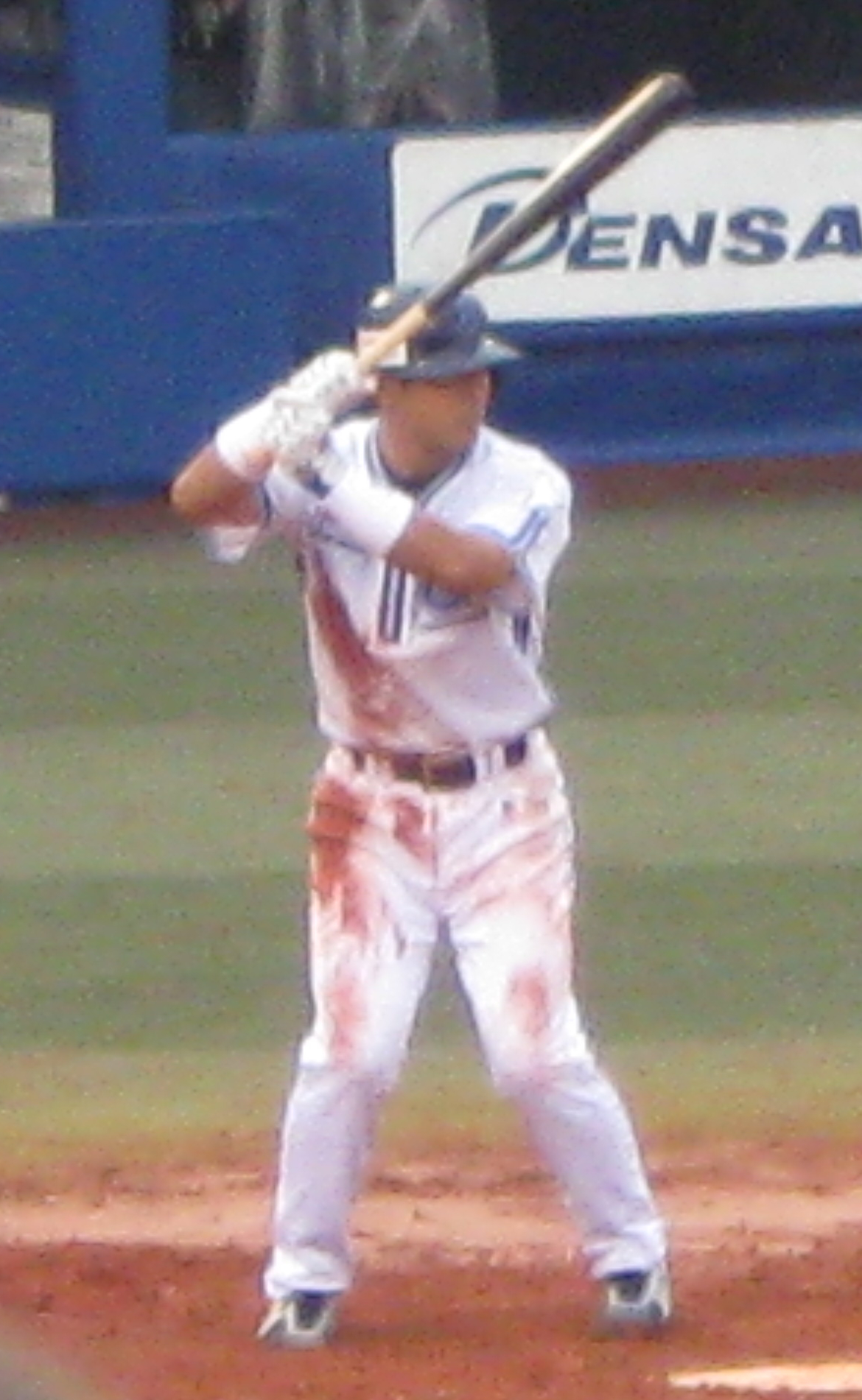

Saitama Seibu Lions – No. 78
- Second baseman / Coach
- Born: October 4, 1971 (age 54); Koga, Ibaraki, Japan
- Batted: Right Threw: Right

NPB debut
- April 5, 1996, for the Yomiuri Giants

Last NPB appearance
- September 12, 2009, for the Yokohama BayStars

NPB statistics (through 2009)
- Batting average: .268
- Home runs: 154
- Hits: 1591

Teams
- As player: Yomiuri Giants (1996–2006); Yokohama BayStars (2007–2009); Lancaster Barnstormers (2010); As coach: Yokohama DeNA BayStars (2021–2023); Saitama Seibu Lions (2025–)

Career highlights and awards
- 1996 Central League Rookie of the Year; 2× Japan Series champion (2000, 2002); 4× Mitsui Golden Glove Award (1999–2002); 5× NPB All-Star (1998, 2000–2001, 2004, 2007)
Medals
Men's baseball
Representing Japan
Baseball World Cup
Bronze medal – third place	1994 Managua	Team

Toshihisa Nishi (仁志 敏久, Nishi Toshihisa; born October 4, 1971 in Ibaraki, Ibaraki, Japan) is a Japanese former professional baseball player.
