= Fujio Tamura =

Japanese baseball player and coach (born 1959)

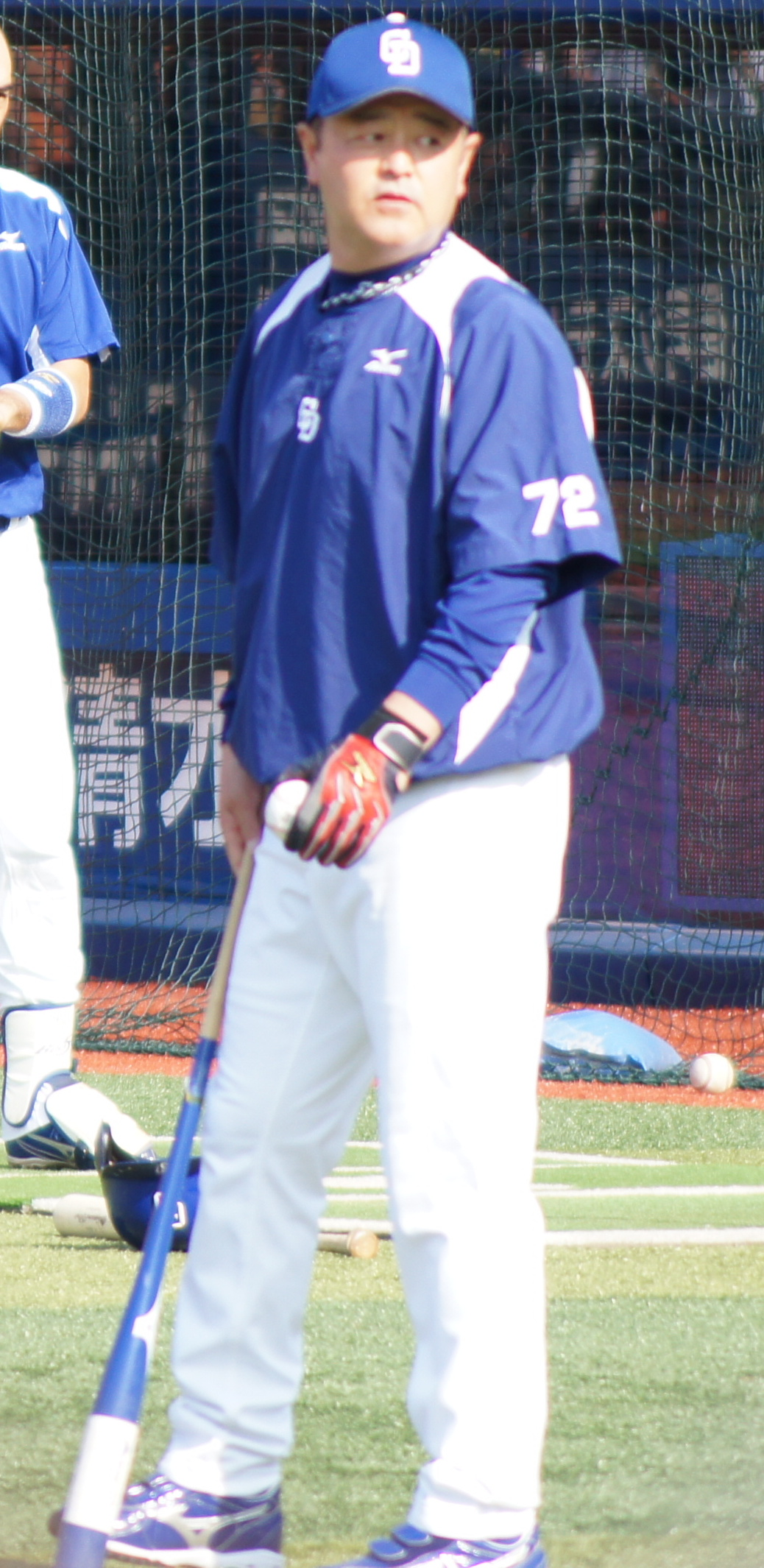
- Catcher / Coach
- Born: October 24, 1959 (age 66); Narashino, Chiba, Japan
- Batted: Right Threw: Right

NPB debut
- September 27, 1981, for the Nippon-Ham Fighters

Last NPB appearance
- August 5, 1997, for the Fukuoka Daiei Hawks

NPB statistics (through 1998)
- Batting average: .252
- Home runs: 110
- Hits: 1123
- Stats at Baseball Reference

Teams
- As player: Nippon-Ham Fighters (1978–1995); Chiba Lotte Marines (1996); Fukuoka Daiei Hawks (1997–1998); As coach: Fukuoka Daiei Hawks (1999); Nippon-Ham Fighters/Hokkaido Nippon-Ham Fighters (2000–2005); Chunichi Dragons (2007–2011); Hanshin Tigers (2012); Fukuoka SoftBank Hawks (2013–2016); Chunichi Dragons (2017–2019)

Career highlights and awards
- 9× NPB All-Star (1986–1994); 1× Best Nine Award (1993); 1× Mitsui Golden Glove Award (1993)
- Last updated on: 19 March 2016

Fujio Tamura (田村 藤夫, Tamura Fujio; born October 24, 1959) is a former Nippon Professional Baseball catcher.
