= Takayuki Shimizu (baseball) =

Japanese baseball player (born 1973)

- Coach
- Born: October 23, 1973 (age 52)
- Bats: Left Throws: Right

NPB debut
- April 6, 1996, for the Yomiuri Giants

NPB statistics (through 2008 season)
- Batting average: .291
- Hits: 1402
- RBIs: 481
- Stats at Baseball Reference

Teams
- As player: Yomiuri Giants (1996–2008); Saitama Seibu Lions (2009); Gunma Diamond Pegasus (2010); As coach: Yomiuri Giants (2011–2015)
- Last updated on: 8 December 2008

Takayuki Shimizu (清水 隆行, Shimizu Takayuki; born October 23, 1973, in Tokyo, Japan) is a former professional baseball outfielder for Nippon Professional Baseball. He was the Number 3 draft pick by the Yomiuri Giants in 1996 and played for them until 2008. After retiring as a player, he was a Giants coach.
