= Kazuhisa Kawaguchi =

Japanese baseball player

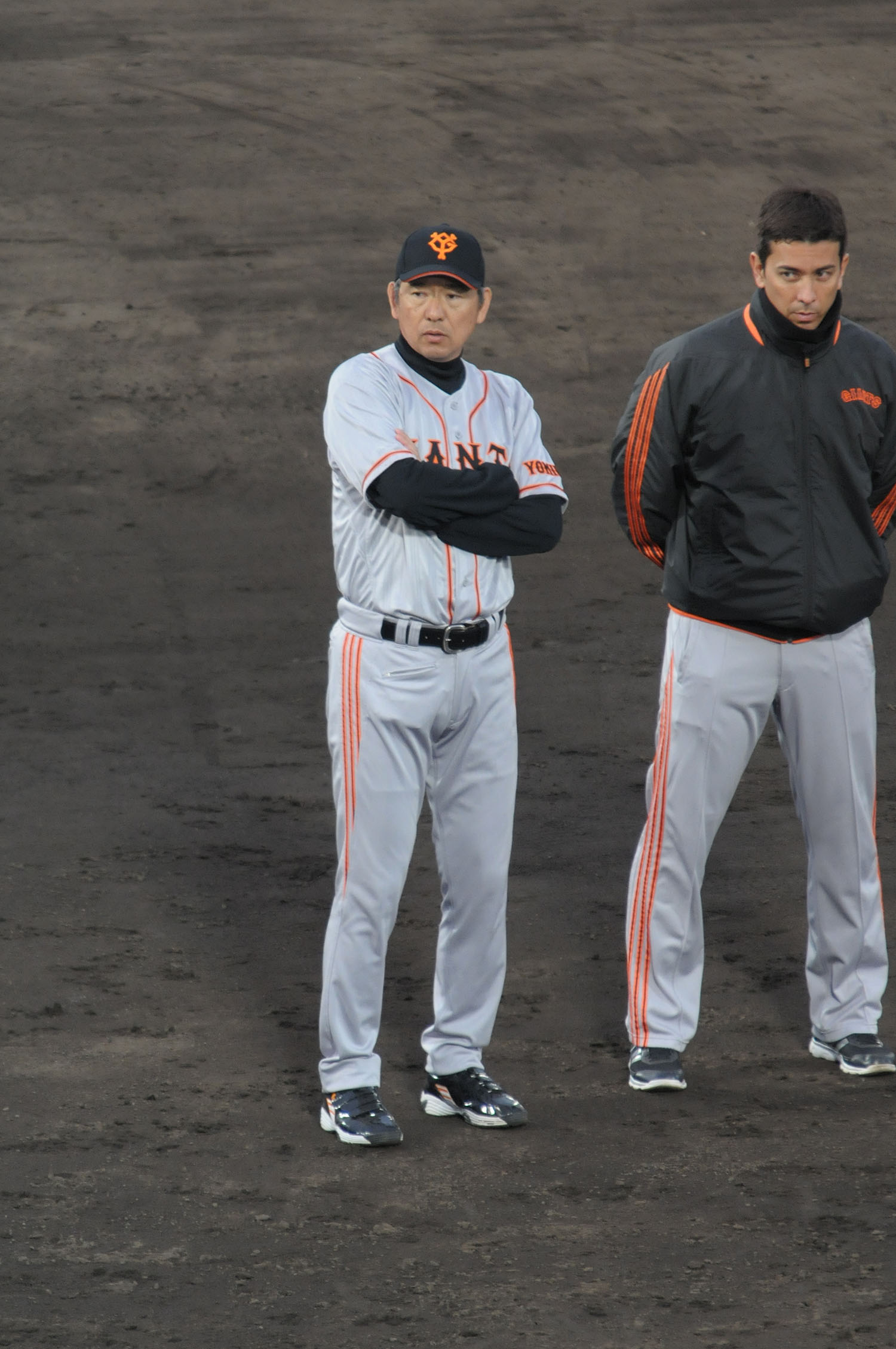
- Pitcher / Coach
- Born: July 8, 1959; Tottori, Tottori, Japan
- Batted: Both Threw: Left

NPB debut
- April 10, 1981, for the Hiroshima Toyo Carp

Last appearance
- October 3, 1998, for the Yomiuri Giants

NPB statistics (through 1998)
- Win–loss record: 139–135
- Earned run average: 3.38
- Strikeouts: 2092
- Saves: 4
- Stats at Baseball Reference

Teams
- As player: Hiroshima Toyo Carp (1981–1994); Yomiuri Giants (1995–1998); As coach: Yomiuri Giants (2011–2014)

Career highlights and awards
- 6× NPB All-Star (1983, 1986 - 1990)
- Last updated on: 5 May 2020

Kazuhisa Kawaguchi (川口 和久, Kawaguchi Kazuhisa; born July 8, 1959) is a Japanese former Nippon Professional Baseball pitcher. In February 2023, he was hired by his former school of Tottori Jōhoku High School, to train its baseball team.
