= 1990 MLB Japan All-Star Series =

The 1990 MLB Japan All-Star Series was the third edition of the championship, a best-of-eight series between the All-Star teams from Major League Baseball (MLB) and Nippon Professional Baseball (NPB), then-called All-Japan.

NPB won the series by 4–3–1 but Ken Griffey Jr. (MLB player) was named MVP. This was the only time that All-Japan won the series in ten attempts, before Japan began being represented by the national team Samurai Japan in future series.

== Results ==
Championship

Game	Winning team	Score	Losing team	Location
1	All-Japan	04–01	MLB All-Stars	Tokyo Dome
2	All-Japan	04–03	MLB All-Stars	Tokyo Dome
3	All-Japan	02–01	MLB All-Stars	Seibu Lions Stadium
4	All-Japan	11–06	MLB All-Stars	Heiwadai Stadium
5	MLB All-Stars	10–05	All-Japan	Koshien Stadium
6	Tie	06–06	Tie	Chiba Marine Stadium
7	MLB All-Stars	03–02	All-Japan	Tokyo Dome
8	MLB All-Stars	05–00	All-Japan	Tokyo Dome

== Rosters ==
=== MLB All-Stars roster ===
Pitchers

- 23 (United States) Oil Can Boyd - (Montreal Expos)
- 31 (United States) Chuck Finley - (California Angels)
- 51 (United States) Randy Johnson - (Seattle Mariners)
- 48 (Dominican Republic) Ramón Martínez - (Los Angeles Dodgers)
- 34 (United States) Dave Stewart - (Oakland Athletics)
- 37 (United States) Dave Stieb - (Toronto Blue Jays)
- 49 (United States) Rob Dibble - (Cincinnati Reds)
- 21 (United States) Jeff Montgomery - (Kansas City Royals)
- 37 (United States) Bobby Thigpen - (Chicago White Sox)

Catchers

- 15 (Puerto Rico) Sandy Alomar Jr. - (Cleveland Indians)
- 14 (United States) Mike Scioscia - (Los Angeles Dodgers)
- 30 (United States) Greg Olson - (Atlanta Braves)

Infielders

- 45 (United States) Cecil Fielder - (Detroit Tigers)
- 27 (United States) Glenn Davis - (Houston Astros)
- 12 (Puerto Rico) Roberto Alomar - (San Diego Padres)
- 14 (Dominican Republic) Julio Franco - (Texas Rangers)
- 13 (Venezuela) Ozzie Guillen - (Chicago White Sox)
- 12 (United States) Shawon Dunston - (Chicago Cubs)
- 17 (United States) Chris Sabo - (Cincinnati Reds)
- 17 (United States) Kelly Gruber - (Toronto Blue Jays)

Oufielders

- 24 (United States) Barry Bonds - (Pittsburgh Pirates)
- 04 (United States) Lenny Dykstra - (Philadelphia Phillies)
- 29 (United States) Jesse Barfield - (New York Yankees)
- 23 (United States) R.J. Reynolds - (Pittsburgh Pirates)
- 24 (United States) Ken Griffey Jr. - (Seattle Mariners)
- 30 (United States) Ken Griffey Sr. - (Seattle Mariners)

Coaching Staff

- 04 (United States) Don Zimmer - (Chicago Cubs)
- 37 (United States) Buck Rodgers - (Montreal Expos)
- 25 (United States) Don Baylor - (Milwaukee Brewers)

=== NPB All-Stars (All-Japan) roster ===
Pitchers

- 17 (Japan) Hiromi Makihara (Yomiuri Giants)
- 18 (Japan) Masumi Kuwata (Yomiuri Giants)
- 41 (Japan) Hisanobu Watanabe (Seibu Lions)
- 21 (Japan) Yukihiro Nishizaki (Nippon-Ham Fighters)
- 11 (Japan) Hideo Nomo (Kintetsu Buffaloes)
- 0 (Japan) Hiroaki Matsuura (Nippon-Ham Fighters)
- 11 (Japan) Yukinaga Maeda (Lotte Orions)
- 29 (Japan) Tsuyoshi Yoda (Chunichi Dragons)
- 21 (Japan) Kazutomo Miyamoto (Yomiuri Giants)
- 48 (Japan) Isao Koda (Yomiuri Giants)
- 13 (Japan) Yasumitsu Shibata (Nippon-Ham Fighters)
- 17 (Japan) Kenjiro Kawasaki (Yakult Swallows)
- 21 (Japan) Tomio Watanabe (Seibu Lions)
- 14 (Japan) Kenji Miyamoto (Yakult Swallows)
- 15 (Japan) Kazuhiro Takeda (Nippon-Ham Fighters)
- 17 (Japan) Osamu Sasaki (Kintetsu Buffaloes)
- 15 (Japan) Katsuyoshi Murata (Fukuoka Daiei Hawks)
- 12 (Japan) Yukihiko Yamaoki (Orix Braves)
- 18 (Japan) Hideki Irabu (Lotte Orions)
- 14 (Japan) Satoru Komiyama (Lotte Orions)
- 26 (Japan) Kazuyoshi Ono (Kintetsu Buffaloes)
- 18 (Japan) Shinji Sasaoka (Hiroshima Toyo Carp)
- 11 (Japan) Masaki Saito (Yomiuri Giants)
- 16 (Japan) Hiroshi Nagatomi (Hiroshima Toyo Carp)
- 34 (Japan) Koji Nakada (Hanshin Tigers)
- 14 (Japan) Shinji Imanaka (Chunichi Dragons)
- 34 (Japan) Kazuhisa Kawaguchi (Hiroshima Toyo Carp)
- 19 (Japan) Hiroaki Nakayama (Yokohama Taiyo Whales)
- 47 (Japan) Masao Kida (Yomiuri Giants)
- 11 (Japan) Takehiro Ishii (Seibu Lions)
- 16 (Japan) Tetsuya Shiozaki (Seibu Lions)
- 24 (Japan) Kazuhiko Endo (Yokohama Taiyo Whales)
- 54 (Japan) Kazuhiko Daimon (Yokohama Taiyo Whales)
- 18 (Japan) Yoshihisa Shiratake (Hiroshima Toyo Carp)
- 28 (Japan) Hisao Niura (Yokohama Taiyo Whales)

Catchers

- 22 (Japan) Fujio Tamura (Nippon-Ham Fighters)
- 27 (Japan) Tsutomu Itō (Seibu Lions)
- 27 (Japan) Koichiro Yoshinaga (Fukuoka Daiei Hawks)
- 27 (Japan) Atsuya Furuta (Yakult Swallows)
- 9 (Japan) Shinichi Murata (Yomiuri Giants)

Infielders

- 6 (Japan) Hiromitsu Ochiai (Chunichi Dragons)
- 16 (Japan) Akinobu Okada (Hanshin Tigers)
- 10 (Japan) Norihiro Komada (Yomiuri Giants)
- 3 (Japan) Kazuhiro Kiyohara (Siebu Lions)
- 3 (Japan) Hiroo Ishii (Kintetsu Buffaloes)
- 3 (Japan) Norifumi Nishimura (Lotte Orions)
- 8 (Japan) Tatsunori Hara (Yomiuri Giants)
- 0 (Japan) Kiyoshi Hatsushiba (Lotte Orions)
- 0 (Japan) Masahiro Kawai (Yomiuri Giants)
- 5 (Japan) Kaoru Okazaki (Yomiuri Giants)
- 1 (Japan) Takeshi Aiko (Lotte Marines)
- 36 (Japan) Takahiro Ikeyama (Yakult Swallows)
- 8 (Japan) Katsumi Hirosawa (Yakult Swallows)
- 6 (Japan) Yukio Tanaka (Nippon-Ham Fighters)
- 5 (Japan) Hatsuhiko Tsuji (Seibu Lions)

Oufielders

- 3 (Japan) Kazuhiko Ishimine (Orix Braves)
- 8 (Japan) Yasuo Fujii (Orix Braves)
- 3 (Japan) Makoto Sasaki (Fukuoka Daiei Hawks)
- 2 (Japan) Kenichi Yamazaki (Yokohama Taiyo Whales)
- 3 (Japan) Hiroshi Yagi (Hanshin Tigers)
- 28 (Japan) Shinji Nishida (Hiroshima Toyo Carp)

Coaching Staff

- 73 (Japan) Motoshi Fujita (Yomiuri Giants)
- 87 (Japan) Masaaki Mori (Seibu Lions)
- 88 (Japan) Kōichi Tabuchi (Fukuoka Daiei Hawks)
- 71 (Japan) Katsuhiro Nakamura (Hanshin Tigers)
- 34 (Japan) Masaichi Kaneda (Lotte Orions)
- 63 (Japan) Sadao Kondoh (Nippon-Ham Fighters)

-
