= 1998 Japan Series =

Team (Wins)	Managers	Season
Yokohama BayStars (4)	Hiroshi Gondoh	79–56–1 (.585), GA: 4
Seibu Lions (2)	Osamu Higashio	70–61–4 (.534), GA: 3½
- Dates: October 18–26
- MVP: Takanori Suzuki (Yokohama)
- FSA: Koji Otsuka (Seibu)

Broadcast
- Television: Fuji TV (Games 1, 6), TBS (Games 2, 4), TV Asahi (Games 3, 5)

The 1998 Japan Series was the championship series of Nippon Professional Baseball (NPB) for the 1998 season. The 49th edition of the Series, it was a best-of-seven playoff that matched the Pacific League champion Seibu Lions against the Central League champion Yokohama BayStars. The BayStars won the series in six games, giving them their first Japan Series championship since 1960.

== Background ==
=== Seibu Lions ===
Fumiya Nishiguchi (13–12, 3.38) led the Lions pitching staff, which was also anchored in the bullpen by Denney Tomori, Shinji Mori, and Kiyoshi Toyoda. Offensively, the Lions had Kazuo Matsui at the top of the lineup, as he batted .311 and stole 43 bases. Rudy Pemberton and Ken Suzuki supplied the power numbers for the Lions. This was the thirteenth league pennant in the last 16 years for the Seibu Lions, who were making their seventh appearance in the Japan Series in the 1990s

=== Yokohama BayStars ===
With an offense called the "Machine Gun Offense" due to their league-leading batting average, the BayStars roared to their first league pennant in 38 years. Takanori Suzuki (.337), Bobby Rose (.325), and team captain Takuro Ishii (.314) led the team with their hitting prowess, and their teammates in the batting order all followed suit. Pitching-wise, Yokohama was led by Takashi Saito and Daisuke Miura for starters, and Kazuhiro Sasaki was practically automatic at closer, recording 45 saves and posting a microscopic 0.64 ERA.

== Summary ==
Game	Score	Date	Location	Attendance
1	BayStars – 9, Lions – 4	October 18	Yokohama Stadium	29,025
2	BayStars – 4, Lions – 0	October 19	Yokohama Stadium	29,076
3	Lions – 7, BayStars – 2	October 22	Seibu Dome	31,599
4	Lions – 4, BayStars – 2	October 23	Seibu Dome	31,685
5	Lions – 5, BayStars – 17	October 24	Seibu Dome	31,756
6	BayStars – 2, Lions – 1	October 26	Yokohama Stadium	29,289

== Game summaries ==
=== Game 1 ===
Sunday, October 18, 1998 6:41 pm (JST) at Yokohama Stadium in Yokohama, Kanagawa Prefecture
Team	1	2	3	4	5	6	7	8	9	R	H	E
Seibu	0	0	0	0	0	2	2	0	0	2	9	2
Yokohama	1	0	3	3	0	1	0	1	X	9	14	1
WP: Hiroki Nomura (1–0) LP: Fumiya Nishiguchi (0–1); Home runs: SEI: Taisei Takagi (1); YOK: Taisei Takagi

Game 1 was delayed a day due to chances of rain. Seibu's Fumiya Nishiguchi was matched against Yokohama's Hiroki Nomura. The game soon turned into a wash for the BayStars, who took a 7–0 lead after the first four innings without hitting a single home run and cruised to a 9–2 victory.

=== Game 2 ===
Monday, October 19, 1998 6:40 pm (JST) at Yokohama Stadium in Yokohama, Kanagawa Prefecture
Team	1	2	3	4	5	6	7	8	9	R	H	E
Seibu	0	0	0	0	0	0	0	0	0	0	3	0
Yokohama	1	0	0	0	2	0	1	0	X	4	9	1
WP: Takashi Saito (1–0) LP: Kiyoshi Toyoda (0–1); Home runs: SEI: None; YOK: Takuro Ishii (1)

Takashi Saito for Yokohama faced Kiyoshi Toyoda for Seibu. Saito threw a complete game on 109 pitches while allowing just three hits and a walk as the BayStars cruised to a 4–0 victory.

=== Game 3 ===
Thursday, October 22, 1998 6:22 pm (JST) at Seibu Dome in Tokorozawa, Saitama Prefecture
Team	1	2	3	4	5	6	7	8	9	R	H	E
Yokohama	0	0	0	1	0	0	1	0	0	2	8	1
Seibu	0	2	2	0	3	0	0	0	X	7	8	0
WP: Tetsuya Shiozaki (1–0) LP: Daisuke Miura (0–1); Home runs: YOK: Motonobu Tanishige (1); SEI: None

Tetsuya Shiozaki was matched for Seibu against Daisuke Miura. Seibu jumped to the lead quickly in the second inning, drawing two walks before a series of groundballs scored two runs, and they added two more runs on base hits after the Lions drew more walks. A three-run double by Kazuo Matsui in the 5th broke the game open entirely as the Lions won their first game of the series.

=== Game 4 ===
Friday, October 23, 1998 6:21 pm (JST) at Seibu Dome in Tokorozawa, Saitama Prefecture
Team	1	2	3	4	5	6	7	8	9	R	H	E
Yokohama	0	0	0	2	0	0	0	0	0	2	4	0
Seibu	0	2	0	0	0	2	0	0	X	4	7	0
WP: Takashi Ishii (1–0) LP: Hiroki Nomura (1–1) Sv: Yukihiro Nishizaki (1); Home runs: YOK: Takanori Suzuki (1); SEI: Domingo Martinez (1), Satoshi Nakajima (1)

Takashi Ishii started for Seibu while Hiroki Nomura started for Yokohama. Nomura went five innings but ran into trouble in the 6th that saw him taken out after Domingo Martinez hit a two-run home run to give the Lions a lead they would not relinquish. Ishii threw 8.1 innings before Yukihiro Nishizaki was tabbed to get the final two outs with a baserunner on in the 9th for the save to even the series.

=== Game 5 ===
Saturday, October 24, 1998 6:21 pm (JST) at Seibu Dome in Tokorozawa, Saitama Prefecture
Team	1	2	3	4	5	6	7	8	9	R	H	E
Yokohama	1	1	2	3	0	0	0	3	7	17	20	0
Seibu	0	0	1	1	0	0	0	3	0	5	11	0
WP: Takashi Saito (2–0) LP: Hisanori Yokota (0–1); Home runs: YOK: Bobby Rose (1); SEI: Ken Suzuki (1), Rudy Pemberton (1)

With the series tied, Yokohama sent out Takashi Saito to start Game 5 against Hisanori Yokota. The BayStars ravaged the Lions with runs in each of the first four innings to lead 7–0 before exploding in the late innings that saw Norihiro Komada drive in five runs on his four hits. Yokota was taken out in the third inning after just facing twelve hitters, but the bullpen could not do any better, as they gave up 14 runs to send Yokohama one step closer to a championship.

=== Game 6 ===
Monday, October 26, 1998 6:41 pm (JST) at Yokohama Stadium in Yokohama, Kanagawa Prefecture
Team	1	2	3	4	5	6	7	8	9	R	H	E
Seibu	0	0	0	0	0	0	0	0	1	1	7	0
Yokohama	0	0	0	0	0	0	0	2	X	2	3	0
WP: Hideyuki Awano (1–0) LP: Fumiya Nishiguchi (0–2) Sv: Kazuhiro Sasaki (1)

With a championship possibly looming, Yokohama sent out Takeo Kawamura to start against Fumiya Nishiguchi. It would prove to be a tight defensive duel, with Nishiguchi going the distance for the Lions with nine innings of three-hit baseball while Kawamura was taken out in the eighth inning. In the 8th inning, a key moment came in with one out in the inning for Yokohama. A one-out walk was followed by a groundball hit by Suzuki to second base, but Takagi missed both the tag on the runner going to second base but also failed to throw the runner out at first base that saw two runners on base. With two outs in the inning, Norihiro Komada provided all the runs that Yokohama needed on his two-run double. Kazuhiro Sasaki was then tasked to save the game for the BayStars. The Lions led off the 9th inning with a triple and then drew a one-out walk. Satoshi Nakajima then hit a groundball to third base that scored the runner from third for a fielder's choice that had two men on with one out. Yoshiaki Kanemura was sent in to pinch-hit for the Lions but soon after grounded into a double play on a grounder to the second baseman to clinch the game for the BayStars.

Yokohama batted .284 for the series while Seibu batted .239.

== See also ==
- 1998 World Series
