= 1989 Japan Series =

Team (Wins)	Managers	Season
Yomiuri Giants (4)	Motoshi Fujita	84–44–2 (.656), 9 GA
Kintetsu Buffaloes (3)	Akira Ohgi	71–54–5 (.568), 0 GA
- Dates: October 21–29
- MVP: Norihiro Komada (Yomiuri)
- FSA: Hiromasa Arai (Kintetsu)

Broadcast
- Television: ABC (Games 1-2), NTV (Games 3-5), MBS (Game 6), YTV (Game 7), NHK BS-1 (All Games, Tape Delay), NHK General TV (Game 4, Tape Delay)
- Radio: NHK Radio 1, TBS (JRN), JOQR (NRN), NBS (NRN), Radio Nippon, MBS Radio

The 1989 Japan Series was the championship series of Nippon Professional Baseball (NPB) championship series for the 1989 season. The 40th edition of the Series, it was a best-of-seven playoff that matched the Pacific League champion Kintetsu Buffaloes against the Central League champion Yomiuri Giants. Kintetsu barely squeaked into the series with a winning percentage only .001 higher than the second place Orix Braves, and Yomiuri won the CL pennant by eight games to return to the series for the 25th time in franchise history. Played at Fujiidera Stadium and Tokyo Dome, the Giants won the series after losing the first three games to the underdog Buffaloes and staging a miraculous comeback, winning four games in a row with the final two wins coming on the road for the first comeback from a 3–0 series deficit since 1986 and first in seven games since 1958.

Yomiuri slugger Norihiro Komada was named Most Valuable Player of the series. The series was played between October 21 and October 29 with home field advantage going to the Pacific League.

== Summary ==
CL Yomiuri Giants (4) vs. PL Kintetsu Buffaloes (3)

Game	Date	Score	Location	Time	Attendance
1	October 21	Yomiuri Giants – 3, Kintetsu Buffaloes – 4	Fujiidera Stadium	2:40	23,477
2	October 22	Yomiuri Giants – 3, Kintetsu Buffaloes – 6	Fujiidera Stadium	3:40	24,207
3	October 24	Kintetsu Buffaloes – 3, Yomiuri Giants – 0	Tokyo Dome	2:50	45,711
4	October 25	Kintetsu Buffaloes – 0, Yomiuri Giants – 5	Tokyo Dome	3:05	45,825
5	October 26	Kintetsu Buffaloes – 1, Yomiuri Giants – 6	Tokyo Dome	3:01	45,717
6	October 28	Yomiuri Giants – 3, Kintetsu Buffaloes – 1	Fujiidera Stadium	3:31	23,030
7	October 29	Yomiuri Giants – 8, Kintetsu Buffaloes – 5	Fujiidera Stadium	3:11	23,091

== Matchups ==
=== Game 1 ===
Saturday, October 21, 1989 at Fujiidera Stadium, Fujiidera, Osaka
Team	1	2	3	4	5	6	7	8	9	R	H	E
Yomiuri	0	2	0	1	0	0	0	0	0	3	7	2
Kintetsu	1	0	0	0	0	2	1	0	X	4	7	0
WP: Hideyuki Awano (1–0) LP: Masaki Saito (0–1); Home runs: YOM: Kaoru Okazaki (1); KIN: Daijiro Oishi (1), Takahisa Suzuki (1)

=== Game 2 ===
Sunday, October 22, 1989 at Fujiidera Stadium, Fujiidera, Osaka
Team	1	2	3	4	5	6	7	8	9	R	H	E
Yomiuri	0	0	0	0	0	2	0	0	1	3	9	1
Kintetsu	0	0	0	0	0	2	4	0	X	6	10	2
WP: Hideaki Sato (1–0) LP: Masumi Kuwata (0–1); Home runs: YOM: Takayoshi Nakao (1); KIN: None

=== Game 3 ===
Tuesday, October 24, 1989 at Tokyo Dome, Bunkyo, Tokyo
Team	1	2	3	4	5	6	7	8	9	R	H	E
Kintetsu	1	2	0	0	0	0	0	0	0	3	5	0
Yomiuri	0	0	0	0	0	0	0	0	0	0	3	0
WP: Tetsuro Katoh (1–0) LP: Kazutomo Miyamoto (0–1) Sv: Masato Yoshii (1); Home runs: KIN: Hidekazu Mitsuyama (1); YOM: None

=== Game 4 ===
Wednesday, October 25, 1989 at Tokyo Dome, Bunkyo, Tokyo
Team	1	2	3	4	5	6	7	8	9	R	H	E
Kintetsu	0	0	0	0	0	0	0	0	0	0	3	0
Yomiuri	1	0	0	0	0	3	1	0	X	5	8	0
WP: Isao Koda (1–0) LP: Kazuyoshi Ono (0–1) Sv: Masato Yoshii (2)

=== Game 5 ===
Thursday, October 26, 1989 at Tokyo Dome, Bunkyo, Tokyo
Team	1	2	3	4	5	6	7	8	9	R	H	E
Kintetsu	0	0	0	0	1	0	0	0	0	1	4	0
Yomiuri	0	0	0	0	2	0	4	0	X	6	8	1
WP: Masaki Saito (1–1) LP: Hideyuki Awano (1–1); Home runs: KIN: Ralph Bryant (1); YOM: Tatsunori Hara (1)

=== Game 6 ===
Saturday, October 28, 1989 at Fujiidera Stadium, Fujiidera, Osaka
Team	1	2	3	4	5	6	7	8	9	R	H	E
Yomiuri	0	0	0	0	2	0	0	1	0	3	9	2
Kintetsu	0	0	0	1	0	0	0	0	0	1	10	0
WP: Masumi Kuwata (1–1) LP: Shintaro Yamasaki (0–1) Sv: Katsuhito Mizuno (1); Home runs: YOM: Kaoru Okazaki (2); KIN: Germán Rivera (1)

=== Game 7 ===
Sunday, October 29, 1989 at Fujiidera Stadium, Fujiidera, Osaka
Team	1	2	3	4	5	6	7	8	9	R	H	E
Yomiuri	0	1	0	3	0	3	1	0	0	8	10	0
Kintetsu	0	0	0	1	1	1	0	0	2	5	7	3
WP: Isao Koda (2–0) LP: Tetsuro Katoh (1–1) Sv: Kazutomo Miyamoto (1); Home runs: YOM: Norihiro Komada (1), Tatsunori Hara (2), Kiyoshi Nakahata (1), Warren Cromartie (1); KIN: Yasunaga Makishi (1), Takayuki Murakami (1), Daijiro Oishi (2)

== See also ==
- 1989 World Series
