= 1990 Japan Series =

Team (Wins)	Managers	Season
Seibu Lions (4)	Masaaki Mori	81–45–4, .643, GA: 12
Yomiuri Giants (0)	Motoshi Fujita	88–42, .677, GA: 22
- Dates: October 20–24
- MVP: Orestes Destrade (SEI)
- FSA: Kaoru Okazaki (YOM)

Broadcast
- Television: NTV (Games 1-2), TBS (Game 3), TV Asahi (Game 4), NHK ETV (Game 4), NHK BS-1 (All Games)
- Radio: NHK Radio 1, TBS (JRN), JOQR (NRN), NBS (NRN), Radio Nippon, NACK5

The 1990 Japan Series was the championship series of Nippon Professional Baseball (NPB) for the 1990 season. The 41st edition of the Series, it was a best-of-seven playoff that matched the Pacific League champion Seibu Lions against the Central League champion Yomiuri Giants. Seibu won the PL pennant for the seventh time in nine years to reach the series, and Yomiuri dominated the CL to return to the series after winning it the year before. Played at Tokyo Dome and Seibu Lions Stadium, the Lions swept the heavily favored Giants in four games to win the franchise's 10th Japan Series title. Seibu slugger and former MLB player Orestes Destrade was named Most Valuable Player of the series. The series was played between October 20 and October 24 with home field advantage going to the Central League.

== Summary ==
PL Seibu Lions (4) vs. CL Yomiuri Giants (0)

Game	Date	Score	Location	Time	Attendance
1	October 20	Seibu Lions – 5, Yomiuri Giants – 0	Tokyo Dome	2:58	46,008
2	October 21	Seibu Lions – 9, Yomiuri Giants – 5	Tokyo Dome	3:36	46,153
3	October 23	Yomiuri Giants – 0, Seibu Lions – 7	Seibu Lions Stadium	2:48	31,804
4	October 24	Yomiuri Giants – 3, Seibu Lions – 7	Seibu Lions Stadium	3:15	31,804

== Matchups ==
=== Game 1 ===
Saturday, October 20, 1990 at Tokyo Dome, Bunkyo, Tokyo
Team	1	2	3	4	5	6	7	8	9	R	H	E
Seibu	3	0	0	0	1	0	0	0	1	5	9	0
Yomiuri	0	0	0	0	0	0	0	0	0	0	3	1
WP: Hisanobu Watanabe (1–0) LP: Hiromi Makihara (0–1); Home runs: SEI: Orestes Destrade (1); YOM: None

=== Game 2 ===
Sunday, October 21, 1990 at Tokyo Dome, Bunkyo, Tokyo
Team	1	2	3	4	5	6	7	8	9	R	H	E
Seibu	2	2	3	0	0	0	1	1	0	9	13	0
Yomiuri	0	2	0	1	1	0	0	1	0	5	9	2
WP: Tetsuya Shiozaki (1–0) LP: Masaki Saito (0–1); Home runs: SEI: Tsutomu Itoh (1), Orestes Destrade (2); YOM: Kaoru Okazaki (1), Kazunori Shinozuka (1)

=== Game 3 ===
Tuesday, October 23, 1990 at Seibu Lions Stadium, Tokorozawa, Saitama
Team	1	2	3	4	5	6	7	8	9	R	H	E
Yomiuri	0	0	0	0	0	0	0	0	0	0	5	0
Seibu	3	0	0	0	0	1	0	3	X	7	9	1
WP: Tomio Watanabe (1–0) LP: Masumi Kuwata (0–1); Home runs: YOM: None; SEI: Koji Akiyama (1)

=== Game 4 ===
Wednesday, October 24, 1990 at Seibu Lions Stadium, Tokorozawa, Saitama
Team	1	2	3	4	5	6	7	8	9	R	H	E
Yomiuri	0	0	1	0	1	1	0	0	0	3	8	1
Seibu	0	0	0	0	6	0	1	0	X	7	13	0
WP: Kuo Tai-yuan (1–0) LP: Kazutomo Miyamoto (0–1) Sv: Tetsuya Shiozaki (1); Home runs: YOM: Shinichi Murata (1), Masahiro Kawai (1); SEI: None

== See also ==
- 1990 World Series
