= Hiroshi Gondoh =

Japanese baseball player and manager

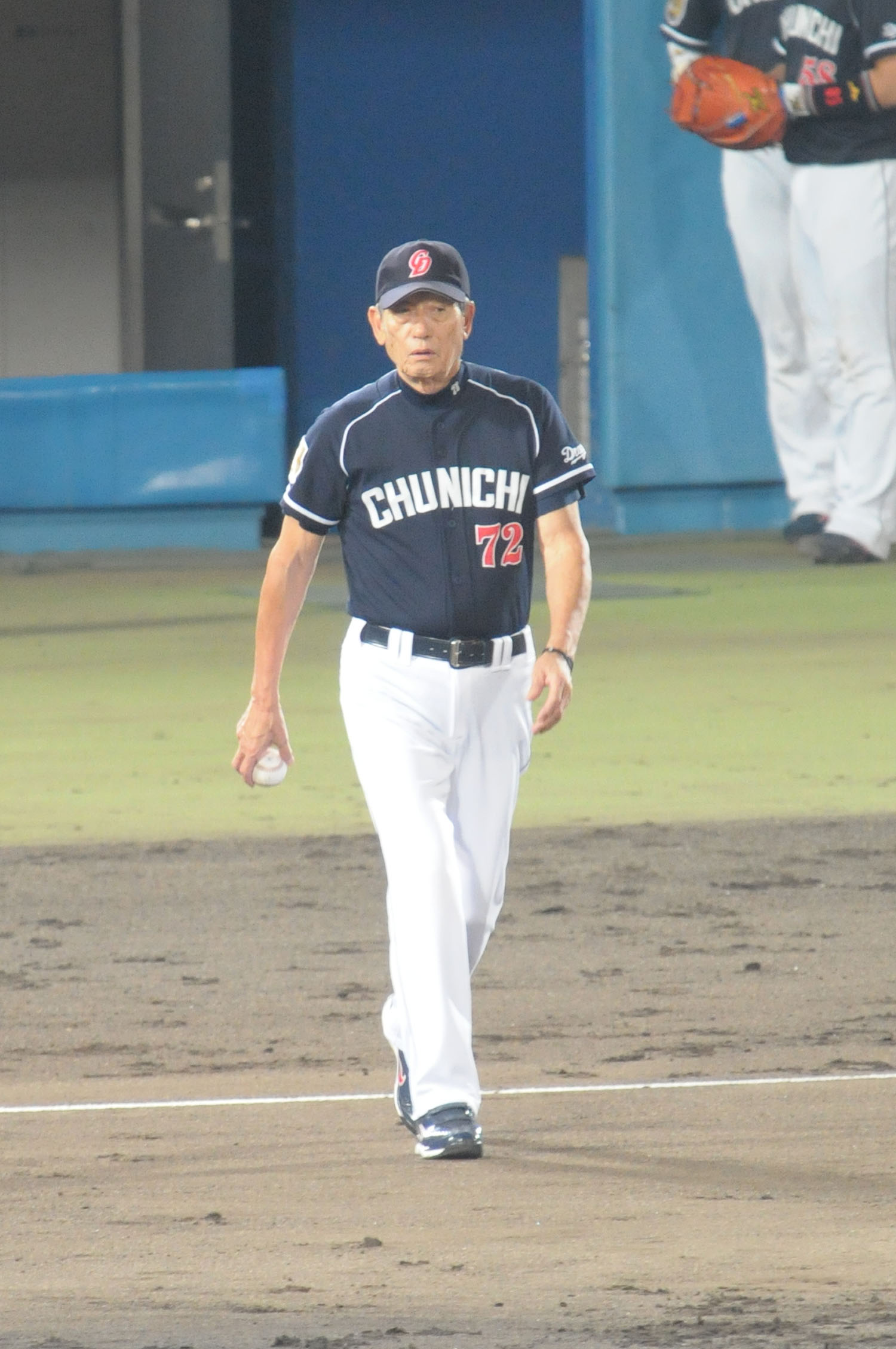
- Pitcher
- Born: December 2, 1938 (age 87); Tosu, Saga, Japan
- Batted: Right Threw: Right

NPB debut
- April 9, 1961, for the Chunichi Dragons

Last NPB appearance
- 1968, for the Chunichi Dragons

NPB statistics (through 1968)
- Win–loss record: 82-60
- ERA: 2.69
- Strikeouts: 667
- Stats at Baseball Reference

Teams
- As player: Chunichi Dragons (1961–1968); As manager: Yokohama BayStars (1998–2000); As coach: Chunichi Dragons (1973–1980, 2012); Kintetsu Buffaloes (1988–1989); Fukuoka Daiei Hawks (1991–1993); Yokohama BayStars (1997)

Career highlights and awards
- As player: Japanese Triple Crown (1961); 1961 Central League Rookie of the Year; 2× NPB Win Champion (1961–1962); Central League ERA Champion (1961); Central League Strikeout Champion (1961); Eiji Sawamura Award (1961); Best Nine Award (1961); 3× NPB All-Star (1961–1963); As manager: Japan Series champion (1998)

Member of the Japanese

Baseball Hall of Fame
- Induction: 2019

Hiroshi Gondoh (権藤 博, Gondō Hiroshi; born December 2, 1938) is a Japanese former Nippon Professional Baseball pitcher and manager. He played his entire career with the Chunichi Dragons. In his rookie season, he collected numerous accolades, including the Central League Rookie of the Year Award and the Eiji Sawamura Award.

In 1998, Gondoh became the manager of the Yokohama BayStars and led them to a Japan Series title in his first year. He was inducted into the Japanese Baseball Hall of Fame in 2019.
