= Takashi Saito =

Japanese baseball player (born 1970)

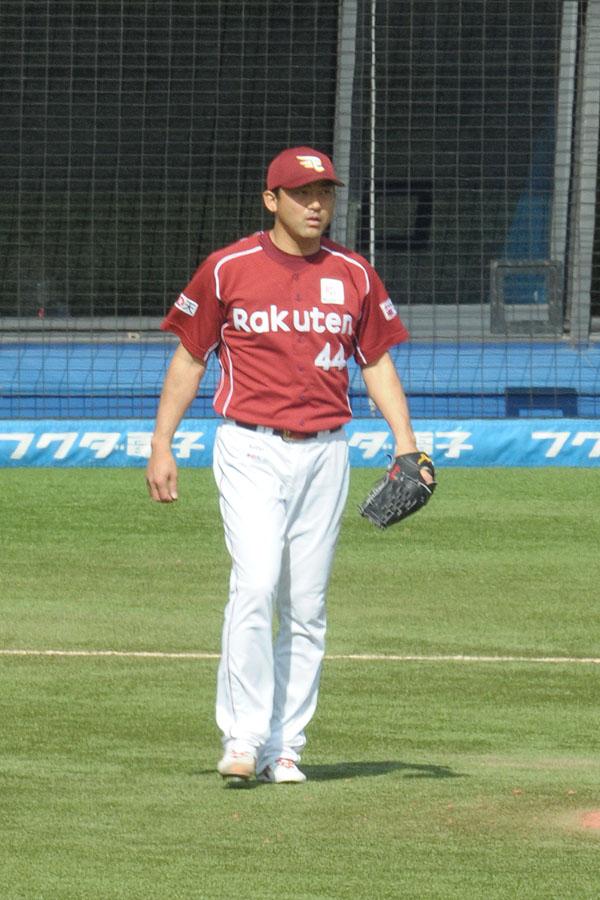
- Saito with the Tohoku Rakuten Golden Eagles
- Pitcher
- Born: February 14, 1970 (age 56); Sendai, Miyagi, Japan
- Batted: Left Threw: Right

Professional debut
- NPB: April 7, 1992, for the Yokohama Taiyo Whales
- MLB: April 9, 2006, for the Los Angeles Dodgers

Last appearance
- MLB: September 30, 2012, for the Arizona Diamondbacks
- NPB: October 4, 2015, for the Tohoku Rakuten Golden Eagles

NPB statistics
- Win–loss record: 91–81
- Earned run average: 3.75
- Strikeouts: 1,331

MLB statistics
- Win–loss record: 21–15
- Earned run average: 2.34
- Strikeouts: 400
- Saves: 84
- Stats at Baseball Reference

Teams
- Yokohama Taiyo Whales / Yokohama BayStars (1992–1996, 1998–2005); Los Angeles Dodgers (2006–2008); Boston Red Sox (2009); Atlanta Braves (2010); Milwaukee Brewers (2011); Arizona Diamondbacks (2012); Tohoku Rakuten Golden Eagles (2013–2015)

Career highlights and awards
- NPB: 4× All-Star (1994, 1996, 1999, 2001); 2× Japan Series champion (1998, 2013); CL Comeback Player of the Year (1998); NPB strikeout Leader (1996); MLB: All-Star (2007)

Takashi Saito (斎藤 隆, Saitō Takashi; born February 14, 1970) is a Japanese former professional baseball pitcher who is currently the chief pitching coach for the Yokohama DeNA BayStars of Nippon Professional Baseball (NPB).

Saito's professional career spanned 23 years. He spent his first 13 seasons pitching for the Yokohama Taiyo Whales / BayStars in the Japanese Central League, compiling a record of 87–80, usually as a starter. He spent the next seven seasons in Major League Baseball (MLB) as a closer and relief pitcher, before finishing his career in Japan with the Tohoku Rakuten Golden Eagles. In his first MLB season of 2006, Saito finished eighth in the National League Cy Young Award voting. In his second season, he was named an All-Star. Dodgers broadcaster Vin Scully bestowed the nickname "the Man from Miyagi" upon him, in reference to the prefecture that encompasses Saito's place of birth. He was also nicknamed "Sammy" by his Dodgers teammates Andre Ethier and Matt Kemp, who affectionally compared him to Sammy Sosa.

== Career ==
=== Japan ===
Saito played for Tohoku Fukushi University in Sendai during his college years alongside players such as closer Kazuhiro Sasaki (who went on to play for the Seattle Mariners) and left fielder Tomoaki Kanemoto (who went on to play for the Hanshin Tigers). Saito was originally a position player, but he became a pitcher in his second year in college. He was drafted in the first round by the Yokohama Taiyo Whales in 1991. He was an All-Star a total of four times while in Japan (1994, 1996, 1999 and 2001), and he led the Central League in strikeouts with 206 in 1996. He was found to have a dislocated cartilage in his right elbow in the spring of 1997 and had to undergo surgery, and he spent the rest of the season rehabbing. He returned in 1998, winning 13 games while posting a 2.94 ERA. His team, the BayStars, also won the Japanese championship series for the second time in 38 years. He became the team's closer after incumbent Kazuhiro Sasaki left the BayStars to join the Mariners in 2000. His record was 7–1 with 27 saves with a 1.67 ERA in 2001. Saito returned to his starting role in 2003 but did not win more than 6 games in a season between 2003 and 2005.

=== Los Angeles Dodgers ===
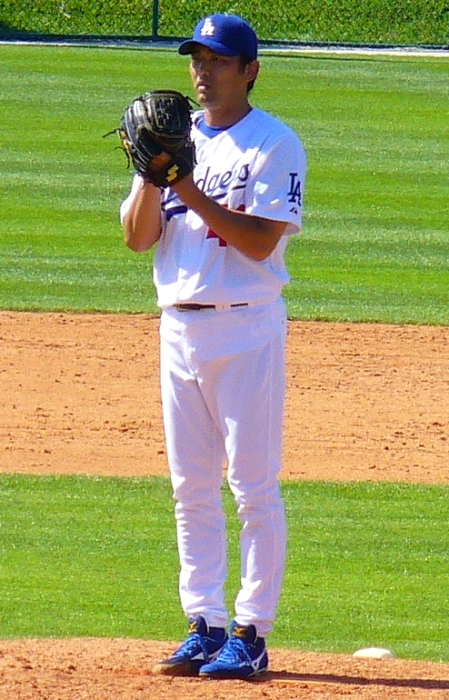
Saito with the Los Angeles Dodgers in 2007.

Saito signed a minor league deal with the Los Angeles Dodgers as a 36-year-old rookie in 2006. He made his first Major League appearance on April 9, 2006, against the Philadelphia Phillies, pitching 2/3 of an inning without giving up any hits or runs. In 2006 he made 24 saves, posted a 2.07 ERA, and struck out 107 batters (the most among relievers). After stepping into the closer role recently vacated by fan favorite Éric Gagné, he recorded his first Major League save on May 15, 2006, against the Colorado Rockies.

Saito threw a 159 km/h (99 mph) fastball on June 26, 2007, which at the time was claimed to be the fastest pitch thrown by a Japanese-born Major League pitcher. In 2007, Saito recorded 39 saves with 78 strikeouts in 64 innings. He posted a career-best 1.40 ERA and 0.715 WHIP. He was named to the National League All-Star team for the first time in 2007 and was also named closer of the month for August of that year, and on September 25, Saito was named one of 10 finalists for the DHL Delivery Man of the Year Award.

Saito had his first career major league at-bat on April 23, 2008. On July 18, 2008, Saito was placed on the 15-day disabled list with a sprained ligament in his elbow. He was activated on September 13. The Dodgers did not offer Saito a contract after the 2008 season and he became a free agent.

=== Boston Red Sox ===
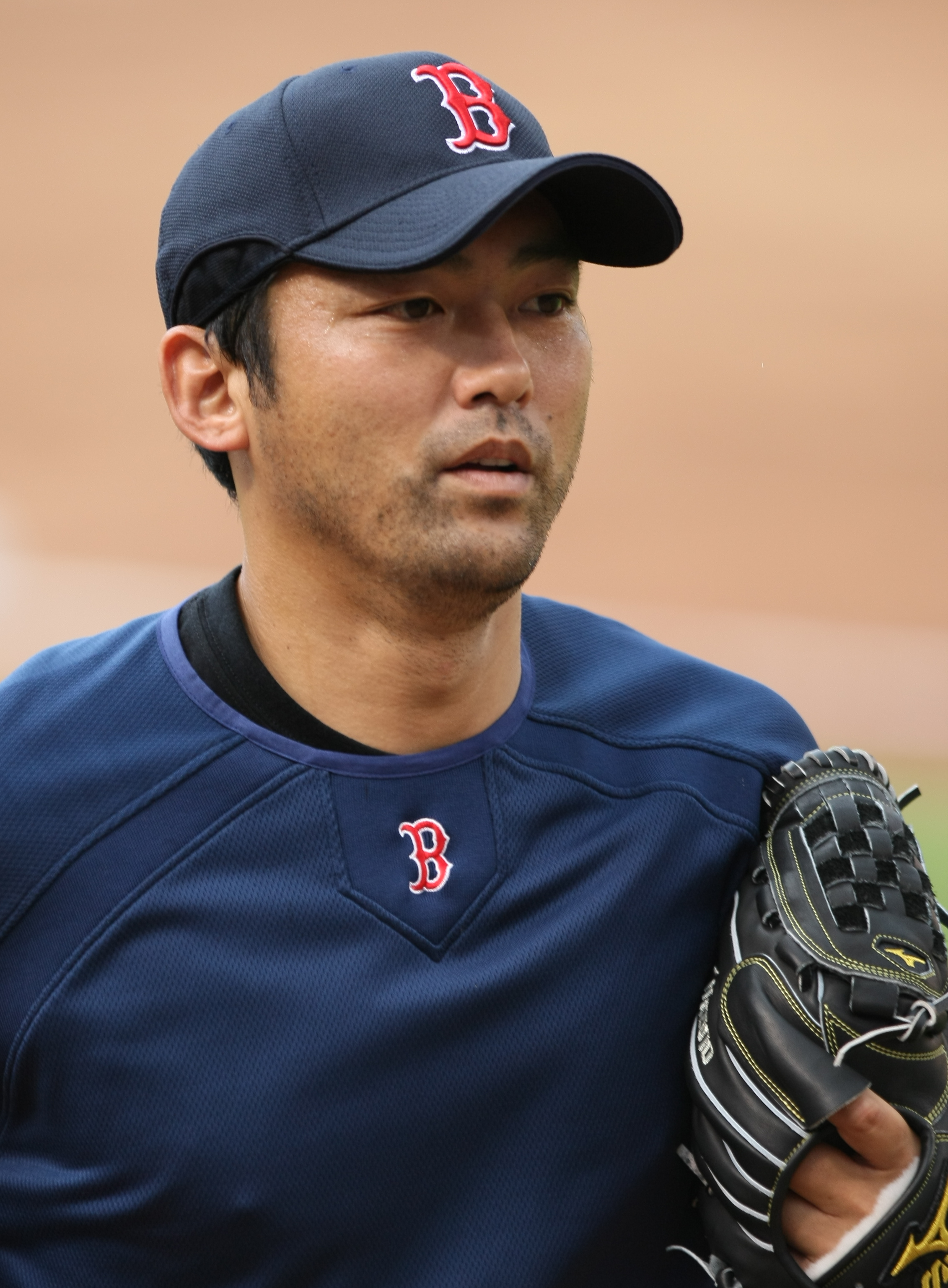
Saito with the Boston Red Sox

On January 10, 2009, Saito signed a one-year $1.5 (+6) million contract with the Boston Red Sox with a team option for 2010. He was 3–3 with a 2.53 ERA in 56 games with the Red Sox, primarily as a setup man, in 2009 (final salary: $6 million).

=== Atlanta Braves ===
Saito signed a one-year $3.2 million contract with the Atlanta Braves on December 3, 2009. He signed a translator, Kosuke Inaji, for the 2010 season. Saito had another productive year, appearing in 56 games for the second consecutive season and posting a 2.83 ERA with 69 strikeouts in 54 innings. He was released by the Braves following the 2010 season, even though he did not have enough MLB experience to qualify for free agency, as stipulated by his contract.

=== Milwaukee Brewers ===
After the 2010 season, Saito signed a one-year contract with the Milwaukee Brewers for about $3 million. Kosuke Inaji retained his position from the previous year as Saito's translator. Although he appeared in just 30 games, Saito was 4–2 with a 2.03 ERA in 2011, marking his sixth consecutive season with a sub-2.90 ERA since joining MLB in 2006. He was the third-oldest player in the National League during this season.

The 2011 season with the Brewers also marked Saito's last postseason appearance in MLB play. Yet it was the first time he was credited with a win (Game 2 of the NLDS) and the first time he pitched beyond a Division Series, as the Brewers advanced to the NLCS. His career postseason totals include a 1–0 record in 10 games with a 1.69 ERA, nine strikeouts, no walks, and no home runs allowed.

=== Arizona Diamondbacks ===
On December 12, 2011, Saito signed a one-year deal with the Arizona Diamondbacks. He struggled in 2012, appearing in just 16 games for the NL club with a 6.75 ERA in just 12 innings. He also spent time at the minor league level. Saito was the second-oldest active player in MLB during the season.

In seven seasons in MLB, Saito finished his career with a 2.34 ERA, 400 strikeouts, and an average of 10.7 strikeouts per nine innings.

=== Return to Japan ===
Saito returned to Japan after the 2012 season, signing with the Tohoku Rakuten Golden Eagles. The Eagles are located in Sendai, Miyagi Prefecture, Saito's place of birth. (Saito was nicknamed "the Man from Miyagi" by Dodgers broadcaster Vin Scully.) The team was founded just one season before Saito left for MLB.

In his first season back in Japan, the Golden Eagles won the 2013 Japan Series for the first and only time in team history. Saito pitched a scoreless ninth inning in Game 3 in his only series appearance after earning the series-clinching win in the Pacific League championship series. In a relief role at age 43, Saito appeared in 30 total games and recorded a 2.36 ERA, finishing with a 3–0 record.

2014, though less successful for the Golden Eagles, saw another productive season from Saito. He logged a 1–1 record with a 2.59 ERA in 31 games, his last full season in professional baseball.

2015 marked Saito's third year with the Golden Eagles, though he did not appear on the active roster for the majority of the season. On August 17, he announced that he would be retiring at the end of the season. On October 4, with only three games remaining on the schedule, the team added Saito to the active roster. That day against the eventual NPB champion Fukuoka SoftBank Hawks, Saito took the mound in the ninth inning and faced one batter, striking him out swinging. He was replaced and received a reception with flowers from current teammates (among them Kazuo Matsui, another former MLB player). Saito was then thrown in the air by teammates five times, a celebratory custom in Japanese baseball. Saito was removed from the active roster the next day.

Saito ended his career with 739 games played with 112 victories and 1,731 strikeouts in 23 NPB and MLB seasons.

== Pitching style ==
Saito threw a four-seam fastball in the low 90s, a two-seam fastball, a slider, and a curveball.

== Post-playing career ==
In November 2015, Saito agreed to a one-year role as a front office intern in the San Diego Padres organization. The role has a baseball operations focus. Saito also agreed to serve as a pitching coach for a series of 2016 Japan national baseball team games. After three seasons with the Padres, Saito returned to Japan to become a pitching coach for the Tokyo Yakult Swallows. In 2022, he was named the chief pitching coach for the Yokohama DeNA BayStars.

== Personal life ==
Saito is married and has three children with his wife.

== See also ==
- Nippon Professional Baseball Comeback Player of the Year Award
