= Hiroki Nomura =

Japanese baseball player and coach

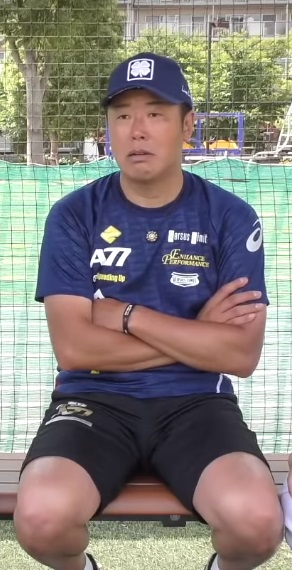
- 2018
- Pitcher / Coach
- Born: June 30, 1969; Hiroshima, Hiroshima, Japan
- Batted: Left Threw: Left

NPB debut
- October 2, 1988, for the Yokohama Taiyō Whales

Last appearance
- October 13, 2002, for the Yokohama BayStars

NPB statistics (through 2002)
- Win–loss record: 101–88
- Earned run average: 4.01
- Strikeouts: 998
- Saves: 0

Teams
- As player: Yokohama Taiyō Whales / Yokohama BayStars (1988–2002); As coach: Yokohama BayStars (2003–2005, 2007–2010)

Career highlights and awards
- 1× Central League wins champion (1993); 3× NPB All-Star (1990, 1991, 1993); 1× Japan Series champion (1998)
- Last updated on: 9 May 2020

Hiroki Nomura (野村 弘樹, Nomura Hiroki; born June 30, 1969) is a Japanese former Nippon Professional Baseball pitcher.

== See also ==
- List of Nippon Professional Baseball players
