= Hideyuki Awano =

Japanese baseball player (born 1964)

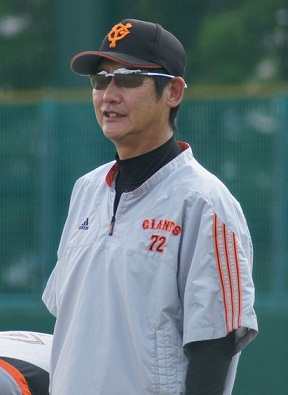
- Pitcher / Pitching Coach
- Born: July 28, 1964 (age 61); Yokohama, Kanagawa, Japan
- Batted: Left Threw: Left

debut
- April 12, 1987, for the Kintetsu Buffaloes

Last appearance
- October 7, 2000, for the Yokohama BayStars

NPB statistics (through 2000 season)
- Win–loss record: 75–68
- Earned run average: 3.71
- Strikeouts: 985
- Saves: 5
- Stats at Baseball Reference

Teams
- As player: Kintetsu Buffaloes (1987–1994); Yomiuri Giants (1995–1997); Yokohama BayStars (1998–2000); As coach: Yomiuri Giants (2001–2005, 2012–2018, 2023); Yokohama BayStars (2006); Chunichi Dragons (2019–2021)

Career highlights and awards
- 1987 Pacific League Rookie of the Year; 1 × Pacific League Best Nine (1989); 1 × Pacific League Golden Glove Award (1989); 4 × NPB All-Star (1987–1990)

Hideyuki Awano (阿波野 秀幸, Awano Hideyuki; born July 28, 1964) is a former Nippon Professional Baseball pitcher for the Kintetsu Buffaloes, Yomiuri Giants, and the Yokohama BayStars.
