= Sacrifice bunt =

Type of action in baseball

In baseball, a sacrifice bunt (also called a sacrifice hit) is a batter's act of deliberately bunting the ball, before there are two outs, in a manner that allows a baserunner to advance to another base. The batter is almost always put out, and hence sacrificed (to a certain degree that is the intent of the batter), but sometimes reaches base on an error or fielder's choice. In that situation, if runners still advance bases, it is still scored a sacrifice bunt instead of the error or the fielder's choice. The batter may safely reach base by simply outrunning the throw to first; this is not scored as a sacrifice bunt but rather a single.

== Strategy ==
A successful sacrifice bunt does not count as an at bat, does not impact a player's batting average, and counts as a plate appearance. Unlike a sacrifice fly, a sacrifice bunt is not included in the calculation of the player's on-base percentage. If the official scorer believes that the batter was attempting to bunt for a base hit and not solely to advance the runners, the batter is charged an at bat and is not credited with a sacrifice bunt.

In leagues without a designated hitter, sacrifice bunts are most commonly attempted by pitchers, who are typically not productive hitters. Managers consider that if a pitcher's at bat will probably result in an out, they might as well go out in a way most likely to advance the runners. The play also obviates the need for the pitcher to run the base paths, and hence avoids the risk of injury. Some leadoff hitters also bunt frequently in similar situations and may be credited with a sacrifice, but as they are often highly skilled bunters and faster runners, they are often trying to get on base as well as advance runners.

A sacrifice bunt attempted while a runner is on third is called a squeeze play. A sacrifice bunt attempted while a runner on third is attempting to steal home is called a suicide squeeze.

Although a sacrifice bunt is not the same as a sacrifice fly, both fell under the same statistical category until 1954.

In scoring, a sacrifice bunt may be denoted by SH, S, or SAC.

== Notable players ==
The following players have accumulated 300 or more sacrifice bunts in their playing careers:

=== Major League Baseball (MLB) ===
Player	Position	Sacrifice hits
Eddie Collins	2B	512
Jake Daubert	1B	392
John "Stuffy" McInnis	1B	383
"Wee" Willie Keeler	OF	366
Owen "Donie" Bush	SS	337
Ray Chapman	SS	334
Bill Wambsganss	2B	323
Roger Peckinpaugh	SS	314
Larry Gardner	3B	311
Tris Speaker	OF	309
Walter "Rabbit" Maranville	SS	300

=== Nippon Professional Baseball ===
- 533: Masahiro Kawai (SS) (world record)

Since the beginning of the live-ball era (1920), the career leader in sacrifice bunts is Joe Sewell with 275. He was first called up by the Cleveland Indians late in the 1920 season, shortly after Indians star shortstop Ray Chapman died after being hit in the head by a pitch, an event generally regarded as the start of the live-ball era.

== Criticism ==
Though touted as good strategy by traditionalists, the sacrifice bunt has received significant criticism by modern sabermetrics. Simply, sabermetricians argue that the value of moving a runner to another base is offset by the team's sacrificing one of its limited and valuable 27 outs. An out conceded is an out wasted, in other words.

The following stats illustrate the argument. From 1993–2010, if a team had a runner on first base with no outs, on average it would score .941 runs from that point until the end of the inning. If a team had a runner on second base with one out, however, the average was .721 runs from that point forward. Thus, if a batter walks to lead off an inning, that team will, on average, score almost one run in the inning. On the other hand, that team decreases its run expectancy by 23 percent [(1 - 0.721/0.941) * 100%] if it successfully bunts and moves the runner to second with one out.

Complicating affairs are the many difficulties and risks associated with bunting. The runner or runners on base must have speed, or the defense may get an easy force out. A manager could feasibly pinch run, but then his bench becomes smaller (that is, there are fewer substitute players available). The player at the plate must also lay down a quality bunt. That is, the player must lay down a bunt that does not pop up, go foul, or go straight to a fielder. Even if all goes well, if the sacrifice bunt is successful, the team must still get a hit to score the runner, and they now have 2 outs remaining instead of three.

Writing for Baseball Prospectus in 2004, James Click concluded that pitchers should nearly always sacrifice bunt when the option is available to them, and that most position players should sacrifice bunt with a runner on second and no outs in situations where scoring at least one run is more important than maximizing run output (i.e. in the late innings of a close game). In all other situations, he found that sacrifice bunting hurts the sacrificing team more than it helps.
