= Makoto Sasaki (baseball) =

Japanese baseball player and coach

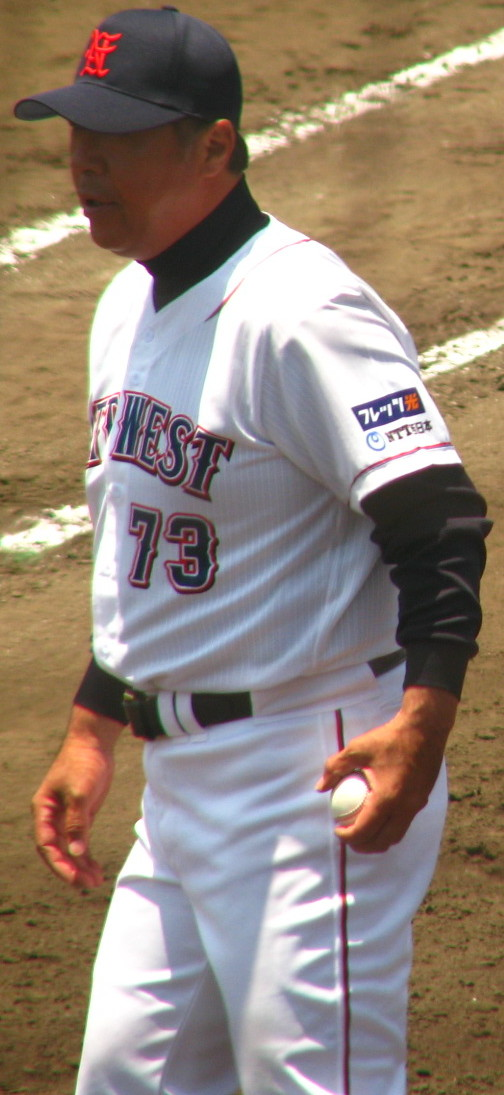
- Outfielder / Coach
- Born: October 3, 1965 (age 60); Kurashiki, Okayama, Japan
- Batted: Left Threw: Left

NPB debut
- April 16, 1985, for the Nankai Hawks

Last NPB appearance
- May 27, 2000, for the Hanshin Tigers

NPB statistics (through 2000)
- Batting average: .277
- Home runs: 170
- Hits: 1599
- Stats at Baseball Reference

Teams
- As player: Nankai Hawks/Fukuoka Daiei Hawks (1984–1993); Seibu Lions (1994–1998); Hanshin Tigers (1999–2000); As coach: Fukuoka Daiei Hawks (2003); Orix BlueWave/Orix Buffaloes (2004–2005); Fukuoka SoftBank Hawks (2015–2017)

Career highlights and awards
- 6× NPB All-Star (1988, 1991–1995); 1× Pacific League batting champion (1992); 2× Pacific League stolen base champion (1992, 1994); 6× Best Nine Award (1991–1995, 1997); 4× Mitsui Golden Glove Award (1991–1994)

Makoto Sasaki (佐々木 誠, Sasaki Makoto; born October 3, 1965) is a former Japanese professional baseball outfielder.
