= Tokyo Junkie =

2021 memoir by Robert Whiting

Tokyo Junkie: 60 Years of Bright Lights and Back Alleys... and Baseball
- First edition
- Author: Robert Whiting
- Language: English
- Genre: Memoir
- Publisher: Adventure Publications
- Publication date: 2021

Tokyo Junkie: 60 Years of Bright Lights and Back Alleys... and Baseball is a 2021 memoir by Robert Whiting, discussing his experiences in Tokyo.

The book includes discussions about world events related to Japan as well as the author's own experiences in Japan.

Peter Tasker, in Nikkei Asia, wrote that the book is not only an autobiography of the author but also a biography of Tokyo itself, making it a "double biography". Laurence Green, writing for The Japan Society of the UK, stated that the work "plays out like a love letter to" Tokyo. Lesley Downer, in The Times Literary Supplement (TLS), described the book as "the story of Tokyo over the sixty years that Whiting has been there".

== Background ==
Whiting, enlisted in the United States Air Force, first visited Japan in 1962 when the Air Force sent him there.

== Contents ==
The author uses section titles related to the employment or life stage he had at the time. Short essays about a particular aspect each are included. Much of the book concerns baseball, a passion of the author, and the book also discusses the yakuza.

Tasker stated that Whiting "presents his young self as a naive, small-town guy". The author discusses the development of Tokyo that occurred in the 1960s. The 1964 Tokyo Olympics is discussed. The author had returned to the United States but in the 1970s came back to Tokyo. Roger Pulvers of the South China Morning Post stated "It is there his personal narrative becomes a compelling study of the society in with which he has thrown his lot."

The end of the book discusses how COVID-19 delayed the 2020 Tokyo Olympics.

== Reception ==
Pulvers gave a positive review of the book.

Kirkus Reviews stated that it is "A delightful memoir".

Publishers Weekly stated that the book shows "Whiting’s love for his adopted city".

Downer stated that the book is "hugely engaging and occasionally very funny".

Green stated that the book "is unapologetically sentimental and sensational at moments."
