= Yukihiro Nishizaki =

Japanese baseball player

Saitama Musashi Heat Bears – No. 21
- Pitcher
- Born: April 13, 1964 (age 61)
- Batted: Right Threw: Right

NPB debut
- April 11, 1987, for the Nippon-Ham Fighters

Last appearance
- September 16, 2001, for the Seibu Lions

NPB statistics (through 2001)
- Win–loss record: 127-102
- ERA: 3.25
- Strikeouts: 1573
- Stats at Baseball Reference

Teams
- Nippon-Ham Fighters (1987–1997); Seibu Lions (1998–2001)

Career highlights and awards
- 7× NPB All-Star (1988-1990, 1993–1996); 1× Pacific League wins champion (1988); 1× Best Nine Award (1988); 2× Mitsui Golden Glove Award (1988, 1996)

Yukihiro Nishizaki (西崎 幸広, Nishizaki Yukihiro; born April 13, 1964 in Otsu, Shiga) is a retired Japanese professional pitcher.
