= Orestes Destrade =

Cuban baseball player and analyst (born 1962)

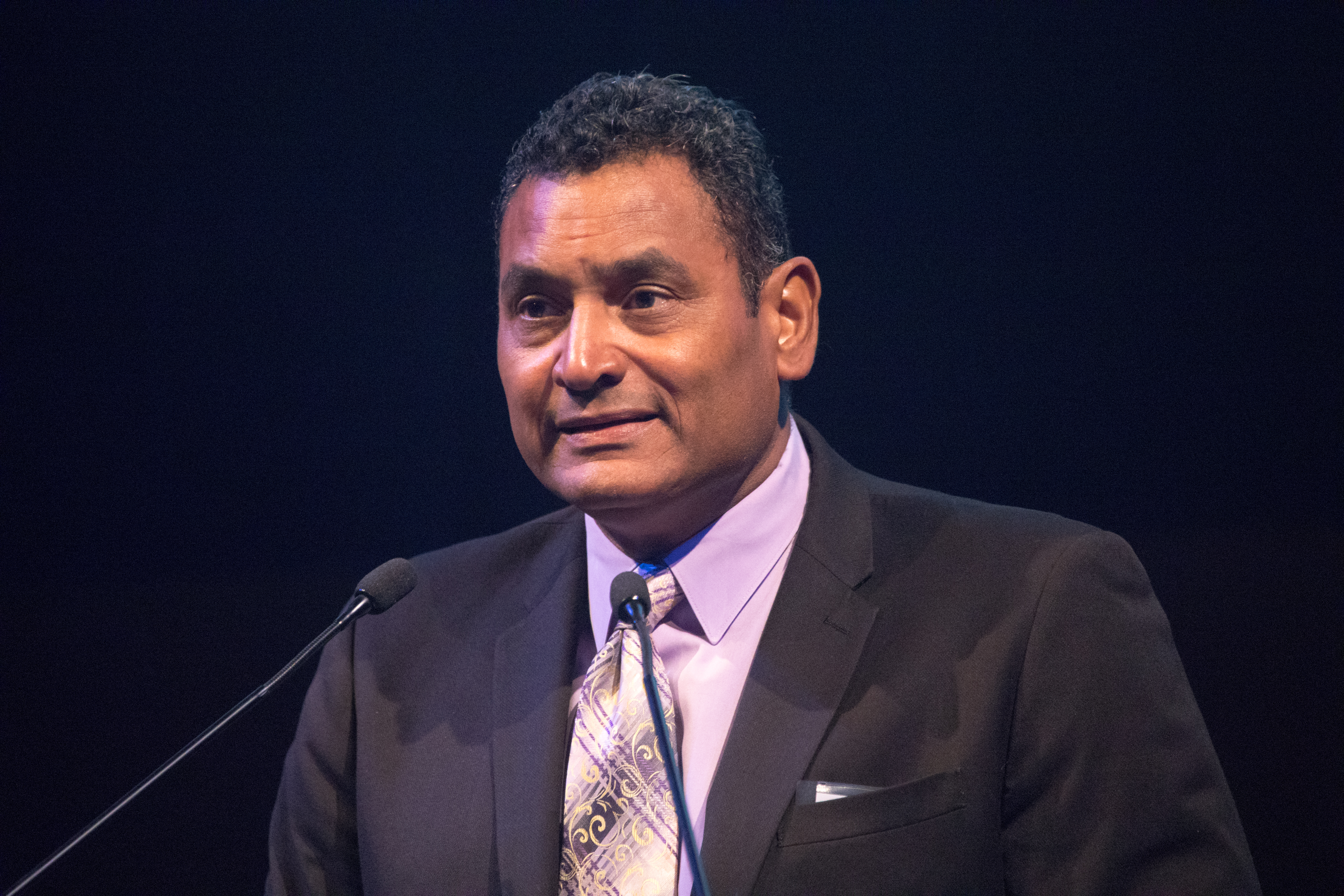
- Destrade in 2016
- First baseman
- Born: May 8, 1962 (age 63); Santiago de Cuba, Cuba
- Batted: Switch Threw: Right

Professional debut
- MLB: September 11, 1987, for the New York Yankees
- NPB: June 20, 1989, for the Seibu Lions

Last appearance
- MLB: May 24, 1994, for the Florida Marlins
- NPB: June 15, 1995, for the Seibu Lions

MLB statistics
- Batting average: .241
- Home runs: 26
- Runs batted in: 106

NPB statistics
- Batting average: .262
- Home runs: 160
- Runs batted in: 389
- Stats at Baseball Reference

Teams
- New York Yankees (1987); Pittsburgh Pirates (1988); Seibu Lions (1989–1992); Florida Marlins (1993–1994); Seibu Lions (1995)

Career highlights and awards
- Japan Series MVP (1990); 3× Best Nine Award (1990–1992); 3× Pacific League home run leader (1990–1992); 2× Pacific League RBI leader (1990, 1991)

Orestes Destrade (born May 8, 1962) is a Cuban American former professional baseball infielder. He played in Major League Baseball (MLB) for the New York Yankees, Pittsburgh Pirates, and Florida Marlins. Destrade also played in Nippon Professional Baseball (NPB) for the Seibu Lions. He was also a broadcaster for the Tampa Bay Rays for 11 seasons. He was nicknamed "The Big O".

== Early life ==
Destrade was born in Santiago de Cuba, Cuba, but emigrated to the United States with his family at the age of six. During his youth, he played in the Khoury League at Tamiami Park in Miami. He graduated from Christopher Columbus High School in Miami, and later attended Florida College.

== Professional baseball career ==
After college, he played many seasons in the minor leagues before his career at the major league level. Destrade was called up in September 1987 with the New York Yankees. He played in 1988 with the Pittsburgh Pirates (where he was the victim of pitcher Randy Johnson's first major league strikeout), and 1993 and 1994 for the Florida Marlins. Destrade was a member of the Florida Marlins' 1993 inaugural season.

Destrade played five seasons (1989–1992 and 1995) for the Seibu Lions of the Japanese Pacific League, where he led the league in home runs for three consecutive years. He was also the MVP of the 1990 Japan Series. Despite his short career in Japan, Destrade is considered one of NPB's best career switch-hitters.

== Broadcasting career ==
Destrade appeared on ESPN's Baseball Tonight. He provided color commentary for the 2006 World Baseball Classic and broadcast again with the 2009 World Baseball Classic for ESPN. He helped broadcast the 2007, 2008 & 2009 Little League World Series. Until April 2007 he was co-host of XM Radio's Baseball This Morning show on MLB Home Plate, XM channel 175, along with Buck Martinez and Mark Patrick. Destrade also worked as an on-field reporter during the Tampa Bay Rays' 2010 postseason celebration after clinching a playoff spot.

Destrade became a broadcaster with the Tampa Bay Rays in 2011. He co-hosted the program Rays Live which aired as the pre and post-game analysis. Destrade was notable for clutching a baseball during his broadcasts — including radio broadcasts. On February 22, 2023, it was announced that Destrade would not be returning for the 2023 Rays season.

Destrade currently hosts a Major League Baseball and Tampa Bay Rays-centric bi-weekly podcast called, "The 'Big O' Show" on the Fan Stream Sports network, hosted in its Tampa Bay studios.

== Personal life ==
Orestes is married and is the father of four children: Danielle, Devin, Armando, and Isabella.
