= Masahiro Kawai =

Japanese baseball player (born 1964)

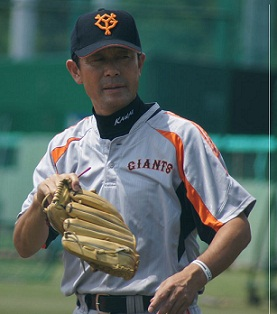

Yomiuri Giants – No. 78
- Coach / Infielder
- Born: September 27, 1964 (age 61); Okayama, Japan
- Batted: Right Threw: Right

NPB debut
- April 24, 1984, for the Yomiuri Giants

Last NPB appearance
- October 26, 2006, for the Chunichi Dragons

NBP statistics
- Batting average: .266
- Hits: 1199
- Runs batted in: 322
- Stolen Bases: 47
- Home runs: 43
- Stats at Baseball Reference

Teams
- As player: Yomiuri Giants (1983 – 2003); Chunichi Dragons (2004 – 2006); As coach: Chunichi Dragons (2007 – 2010); Yomiuri Giants (2011 – 2018, 2023 - )

Career highlights and awards
- 3× Centar League Stolen Base Champion (1990, 1991, 1994); 1× Centar League Best Nine Award (1994); 6× Centar League Golden Glove Award (1989 - 1991, 1993, 1994, 1996); 2× NPB All-Star (1990, 1993); 1× Central League Chairman's Award (2003)

Masahiro Kawai (川相 昌弘, Kawai Masahiro; born September 27, 1964) is a Japanese former professional baseball infielder, who currently is a coach for the Yomiuri Giants. He played for 23 years in Nippon Professional Baseball (NPB), primarily with the Yomiuri Giants. Known for his defense and bunting, he won several Gold Gloves, made two All-Star teams and set several sacrifice hit records.

Kawai was a pitcher in high school. In 1982, the Giants took him in the first round of the draft. He was moved to the infield and debuted for the Giants in 1984, mostly as a defensive substitute and pinch-hitter, getting only 126 plate appearances over 159 games in his first four years. He got 81 plate appearances at age 23 in 1988, hitting .268/.307/.423.

Masahiro became a regular for the 1989 Giants, batting .254/.312/.361 and won his first Gold Glove as the top defensive shortstop in the Central League. He hit .190/.261/.238 for Yomiuri as they won the 1989 Japan Series. The next season, he set a new Nippon Professional Baseball record with 58 sacrifice hits and put up a good .288/.356/.450 line with career highs in slugging, home runs (9) and steals (9). He made the first of his two All-Star appearances and won another Gold Glove. In the 1990 Japan Series, he went 2 for 10 with a walk and a game four home run, a rare bright spot as the Giants were swept.

In 1991, the Yomiuri shortstop took home his third Gold Glove while hitting .251/.330/.312 with a career-best 36 RBI. He laid down 66 successful sacrifice hits, breaking his own record; his mark would later be topped by Shinya Miyamoto. The next year, Masahiro had a .258/.312/.345 and led the Central League with 42 sacrifice hits. Takahiro Ikeyama broke his Gold Glove run at short.

Kawai hit .290/.350/.381 in 1993 and made his second All-Star appearance while winning his fourth Gold Glove. His 176 total bases and 23 doubles were career highs and his 45 sacrifice hits gave him the Central League lead for a fourth consecutive year. Masahiro scored a career-high 69 runs in 1994 and hit .302/.376/.357, setting highs in average and OBP as well. He finished 9th in the Central League in average and won his fifth Gold Glove. He only batted .091/.160/.136 in the 1994 Japan Series but Yomiuri still won.

In 1995, the 30-year-old veteran produced at a .261/.348/.313 rate and lost the Gold Glove to Kenjiro Nomura. His 47 sacrifice hits led the league. The next season, Kawai batted just .232/.310/.277 and won his sixth and final Gold Glove; he also led in sacrifice hits for the sixth time (56). He was 4 for 13 with 4 walks in the 1996 Japan Series. He capped his 7th sacrifice hit title in 8 years and the last of his career by laying down 45 in 1997, when he hit .288/.355/.392.

Masahiro batted .256/.301/.327 during the 1998 season and he failed to reach 100 games played for the first time in six years as Daisuke Motoki was used regularly at short; Kawai remained the starter. He became the chairman of the board of the Japan Professional Baseball Players Association that winter; he would hold the job for three years before Kazuyoshi Tatsunami took his place.

By 1999, though, he was on the bench usually, hitting .295/.371/.302 in 149 AB and 82 games, in a backup role again after a decade as the starter. Tomohiro Nioka was now the starting shortstop and would hold the role for years.

Kawai had only 58 AB in 54 games in 2000, batting .190/.294/.207 (he was 0 for 1 with a sacrifice in the 2000 Japan Series) and 52 AB in 73 games the next season, hitting .288/.315/.462. His career had come full-circle from defensive sub in the 1980s to starter in the 1990s to defensive sub in the 2000s.

In 2002, the 37-year-old produced at a .219/.246/.289 rate in 132 AB over 88 games, backing up Nioka at short, Motoki at third and Toshihisa Nishi at second base. In the 2002 Japan Series, he played one game at third as a defensive sub. His brightest moment may have been in 2003; though he hit only .238/.247/.300 in 80 AB over 72 games and was rarely playing short (primarily subbing for Akira Eto and Motoki at third), he won national acclaim when he laid down his 512th career sacrifice hit. This broke Eddie Collins' world record and got significant media attention in Japan. Robert Whiting, perhaps using a fair bit of hyperbole, says that it "was greeted with as much fanfare as if he had surpassed the home run record. There were fireworks on the Tokyo Dome electronic scoreboard and a flowery ceremony involving Kawai's wife and children, accompanied by tears of joy all around." Yomiuri then tried to pressure him to retire but he refused and the club released him after 20 years with them.

Kawai caught on with the Chunichi Dragons for 2004 and hit .261/.393/.391 in 23 AB, playing 80 games, almost exclusively as Tatsunami's backup at third base. In the 2004 Japan Series, he played three games at third and did not bat. In 2005, the 40-year-old again was the defensive substitute at third. He hit .294/.294/.412 in 17 AB over 69 games. For his final season, he batted .273/.304/.273 in 22 AB in 51 games. He played one game in the 2006 Japan Series and, very fittingly, laid down a successful sacrifice bunt in his final plate appearance after 23 years in Nippon Professional Baseball.

His career offensive line read .266/.333/.345 with 533 sacrifice hits in 1,909 games. Ken Hirano (451) was second all-time in Nippon Professional Baseball in sacrifice hits at the time of Kawai's retirement with no other player within 200.

Kawai retired after the 2006 season and was hired by Chunichi as a coach.

== See also ==
- The Meaning of Ichiro by Robert Whiting
