= Taisei Takagi =

Japanese baseball player

- Catcher / Infielder / Outfielder
- Born: December 7, 1973; Hachiōji, Tokyo, Japan
- Batted: Left Threw: Right

NPB debut
- March 31, 1993, for the Seibu Lions

Last appearance
- April 17, 2005, for the Seibu Lions

NPB statistics (through 2005)
- Batting average: .263
- Hits: 599
- Home runs: 56
- Runs batted in: 319
- Stolen base: 67
- Stats at Baseball Reference

Teams
- Seibu Lions (1996–2005)

Career highlights and awards
- 2× Pacific League Golden Glove Award (1997, 1998); 3× NPB All-Star (1997–1999)

Taisei Takagi (髙木 大成, Takagi Taisei; born December 7, 1973 in Hachiōji, Tokyo, Japan) is a Japanese former Nippon Professional Baseball catcher/infielder/outfielder.
