= Domingo Martínez (baseball) =

Dominican baseball player (born 1965)

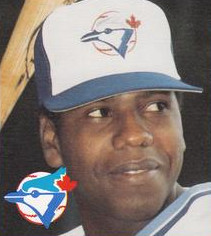
- Martínez in 1988
- First baseman
- Born: August 4, 1965 (age 60); Santo Domingo, Dominican Republic
- Batted: Right Threw: Right

Professional debut
- MLB: September 11, 1992, for the Toronto Blue Jays
- NPB: April 5, 1997, for the Seibu Lions

Last appearance
- MLB: October 3, 1993, for the Toronto Blue Jays
- NPB: September 27, 2001, for the Yomiuri Giants

MLB statistics
- Batting average: .409
- Home runs: 2
- Runs batted in: 6

NPB statistics
- Batting average: .293
- Home runs: 104
- Runs batted in: 350
- Stats at Baseball Reference

Teams
- Toronto Blue Jays (1992–1993); Seibu Lions (1997–1998); Yomiuri Giants (1999–2001)

Domingo Emilio Martínez Lafontaine (born August 4, 1965) is a Dominican former professional baseball player who played for the Toronto Blue Jays in the major leagues, and the Seibu Lions and Yomiuri Giants in Nippon Professional Baseball. He currently works as a scout for the Chunichi Dragons.

== Career ==
Martínez was signed by the Toronto Blue Jays in 1984, and spent several years in the minors before making his major league debut in 1992. He played in seven games that year, and eight games in 1993, before being traded to the Chicago White Sox. However, he did not play in the major leagues again, and was eventually signed by the Seibu Lions in 1997.

He was expected to become the team's cleanup batter, replacing Kazuhiro Kiyohara, who had signed with the Yomiuri Giants. He went on to play the entire season as the team's designated hitter, batting .305 with 31 home runs and 108 RBIs. He was recognized for his standout hitting with a Best Nine award in 1997, and his round appearance made him a popular figure among fans, who gave him the nickname Maruchan. He continued his success the following year, hitting 30 homers and driving in 95 runs, but was not re-signed following the 1998 season. The Lions would miss Martínez's presence in the lineup in 1999, as the poor performances of his foreign replacements in Greg Blosser and Alan Zinter, and the team's overall lack of power, were significant factors in the Lions not winning their third straight Pacific League title.

Martínez spent the beginning of 1999 playing in the Mexican League, but was called back to Japan by the Yomiuri Giants, who signed him in June. Martínez was ineffective as a pinch-hitter, but contributed greatly after becoming the regular left fielder. He continued his hitting prowess by batting .324 with 16 homers and 56 RBIs, but his poor fielding often required a defensive substitution late in games. He also filled in at first base, his natural position, over the course of his three seasons with the Giants when Kazuhiro Kiyohara was injured.

He hit well again for the Giants in 2000, putting together a .288 average with 17 home runs and 64 RBIs. Injuries and weight problems relegated Martinez to a bench role in 2001, and he batted just .237 with 10 homers and 27 RBIs. Martinez retired after his contract expired at the end of 2001, and he later joined the Central League's Chunichi Dragons as a scout in 2006.
