= Bunt (baseball) =

Batting technique in baseball or fastpitch softball

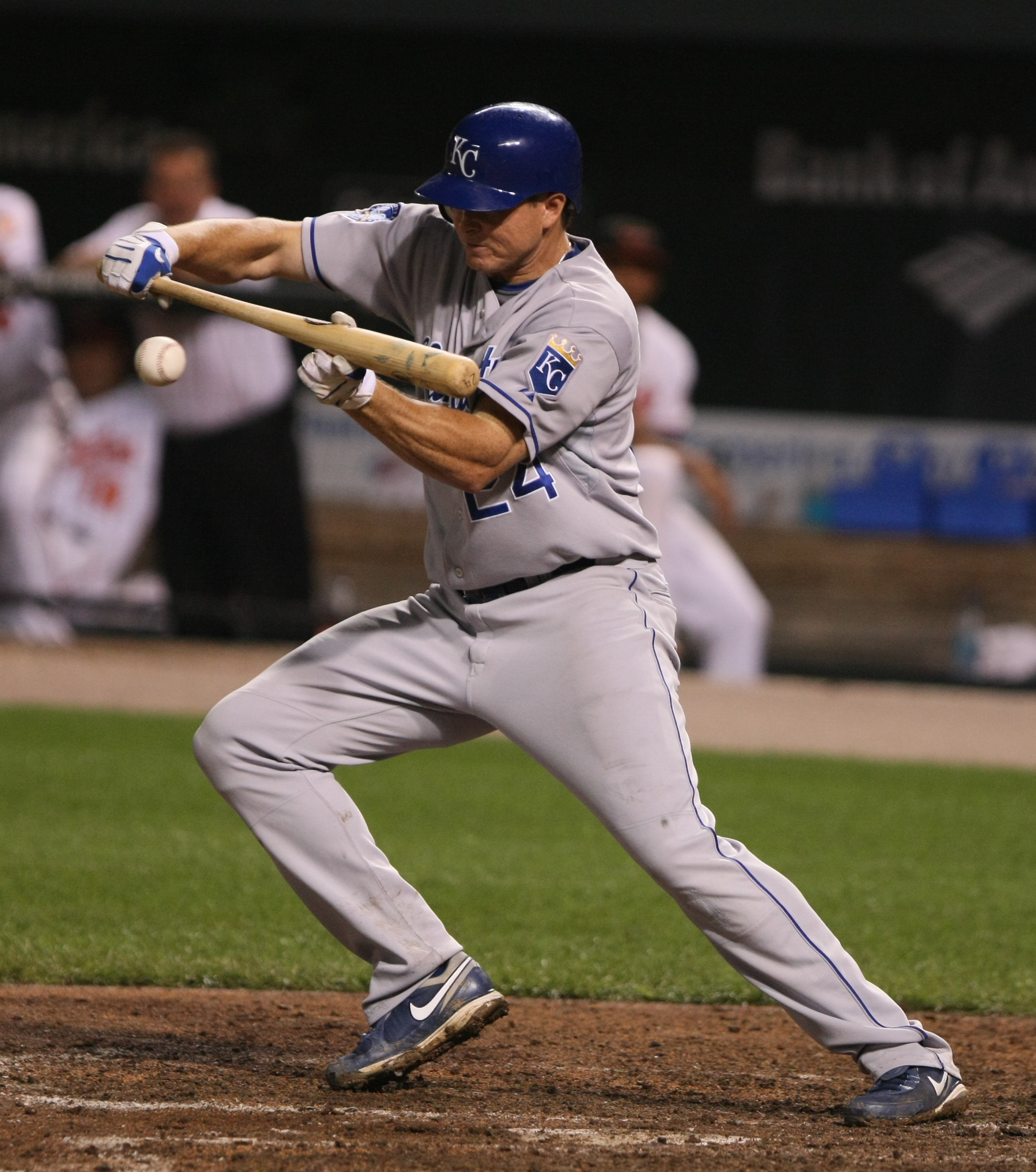
Mark Teahen squares around to bunt.

A bunt is a batting technique in baseball or fastpitch softball. Official Baseball Rules define a bunt as follows: "A bunt is a batted ball not swung at, but intentionally met with the bat and tapped slowly within the infield." To bunt, the batter loosely holds the bat in front of home plate and intentionally taps the ball into play. A properly executed bunt will create weak contact with the ball or strategically direct it, forcing the infielders to make a difficult defensive play to record an out.

== Technique ==
The strategy in bunting is to ground the ball into fair territory, as far from the fielders as possible but within the infield. This requires not only physical dexterity and concentration, but also an awareness of the fielders' positions in relation to the baserunner or baserunners, their likely reactions to the bunt, and knowledge of the pitcher's most likely pitches.

The bunt is typically executed by the batter turning his body toward the pitcher and sliding one hand up the barrel of the bat to help steady it. This is called squaring up. Depending on the situation, the batter might square up either before the pitcher winds up, or as the pitched ball approaches the plate. Sometimes, a batter may square up, then quickly retract the bat and take a full swing as the pitch is delivered.

== Types ==
=== Sacrifice bunt ===
In a sacrifice bunt (also called a sacrifice hit), the batter will put the ball into play with the intention of advancing a baserunner, in exchange for the batter being thrown out. The sacrifice bunt is most often used to advance a runner from first to second base, though the runner may also be advanced from second to third base, or from third to home. The batter is almost always put out, and hence sacrificed (to a certain degree that is the intent of the batter), but sometimes reaches base on an error or fielder's choice (in which case it is still scored a sacrifice bunt). Sometimes, the batter may safely reach base by simply outrunning the throw to first; this is not scored as a sacrifice bunt but rather a single.

A successful sacrifice bunt does not count as an at bat, does not impact a player's batting average, and counts as a plate appearance. Unlike a sacrifice fly - both fell under the same statistical category until 1954 - a sacrifice bunt is not included in the calculation of the player's on-base percentage. However, if the official scorer believes that the batter was attempting to bunt for a base hit and not solely to advance the runners, the batter is charged an at bat and is not credited with a sacrifice bunt. A sacrifice bunt may be denoted by SH, S, or, occasionally, SAC.

In leagues without a designated hitter, sacrifice bunts are most commonly attempted by pitchers, who are typically not productive hitters. Managers consider that if a pitcher's at bat will probably result in an out, they might as well go out in a way most likely to advance the runners. The play also obviates the need for the pitcher to run the base paths, and hence avoids the risk of injury. Some leadoff hitters also bunt frequently in similar situations and may be credited with a sacrifice, but as they are often highly skilled bunters and faster runners, they are often trying to get on base as well as advance runners.

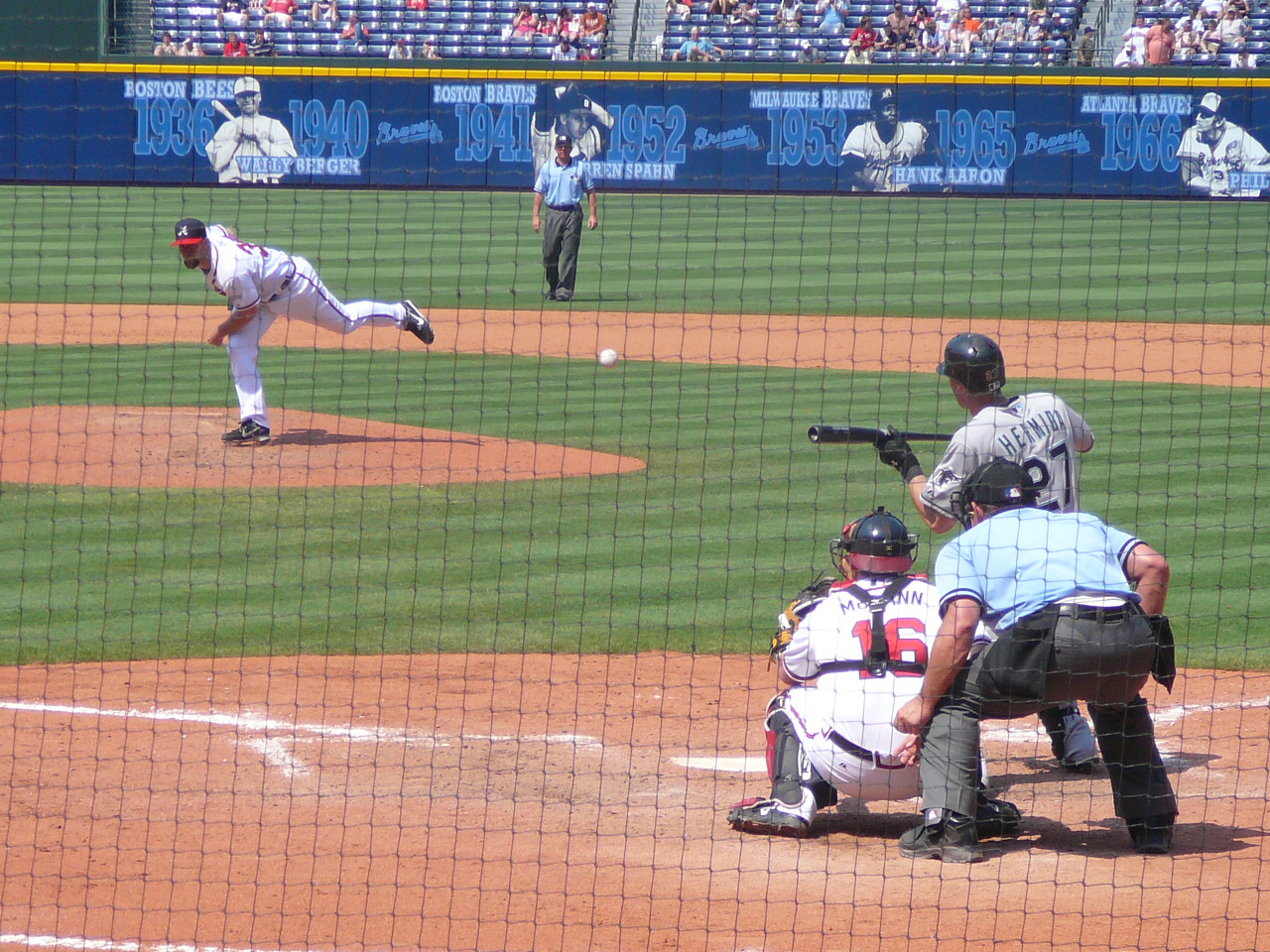
Jeremy Hermida of the Florida Marlins attempting to bunt

==== Squeeze play ====
A sacrifice bunt with a runner on third base is called a squeeze play. The batter bunts the ball, expecting to be thrown out at first base, but providing the runner on third base an opportunity to score. Such a bunt is most common with one out. According to Baseball Almanac, the squeeze play was invented in 1894 by George Case and Dutch Carter during a college game at Yale University.

In a safety squeeze, the runner at third takes a lead, but does not run towards home plate until the batter makes contact bunting. A play at home plate is possible.

In a suicide squeeze, the runner takes off as soon as the pitcher begins the windup to throw the pitch, and before releasing the ball. If properly executed, and the batter bunts the ball nearly anywhere in fair territory on the ground, a play at home plate is extremely unlikely. However, if the batter misses the ball the runner will likely be tagged out, and if the batter pops the ball up a double play is likely. Due to the high-risk nature of this play, it is not often executed, but can often be an exciting moment within the game.

These plays are often used in the late innings of a close game to score a tying, winning, or insurance run. A pitcher's typical defense against a squeeze play, if he sees the batter getting into position to attempt a bunt, is to throw a high pitch that is difficult to bunt on the ground. If a runner scores in a squeeze play, the batter may be credited with an RBI.

=== Bunting for a base hit ===
A batter may also bunt for a base hit. This is not a sacrifice play, because the batter is trying to reach base safely, without any intention of advancing a runner. A batter may try to bunt for a base hit while there are runners on base. In this case, if the runner advances and the batter is thrown out, and if the official scorer judges that the intention of the batter was to bunt for a base hit, then the batter will not receive credit for a sacrifice bunt. A batter bunting for a base hit will often hold back his bunt while the pitcher begins delivering the ball, in order to surprise the fielders. If successful, the bunt is scored as a hit single. Rarely does a bunt result in a double, and never has one resulted in a triple in MLB.

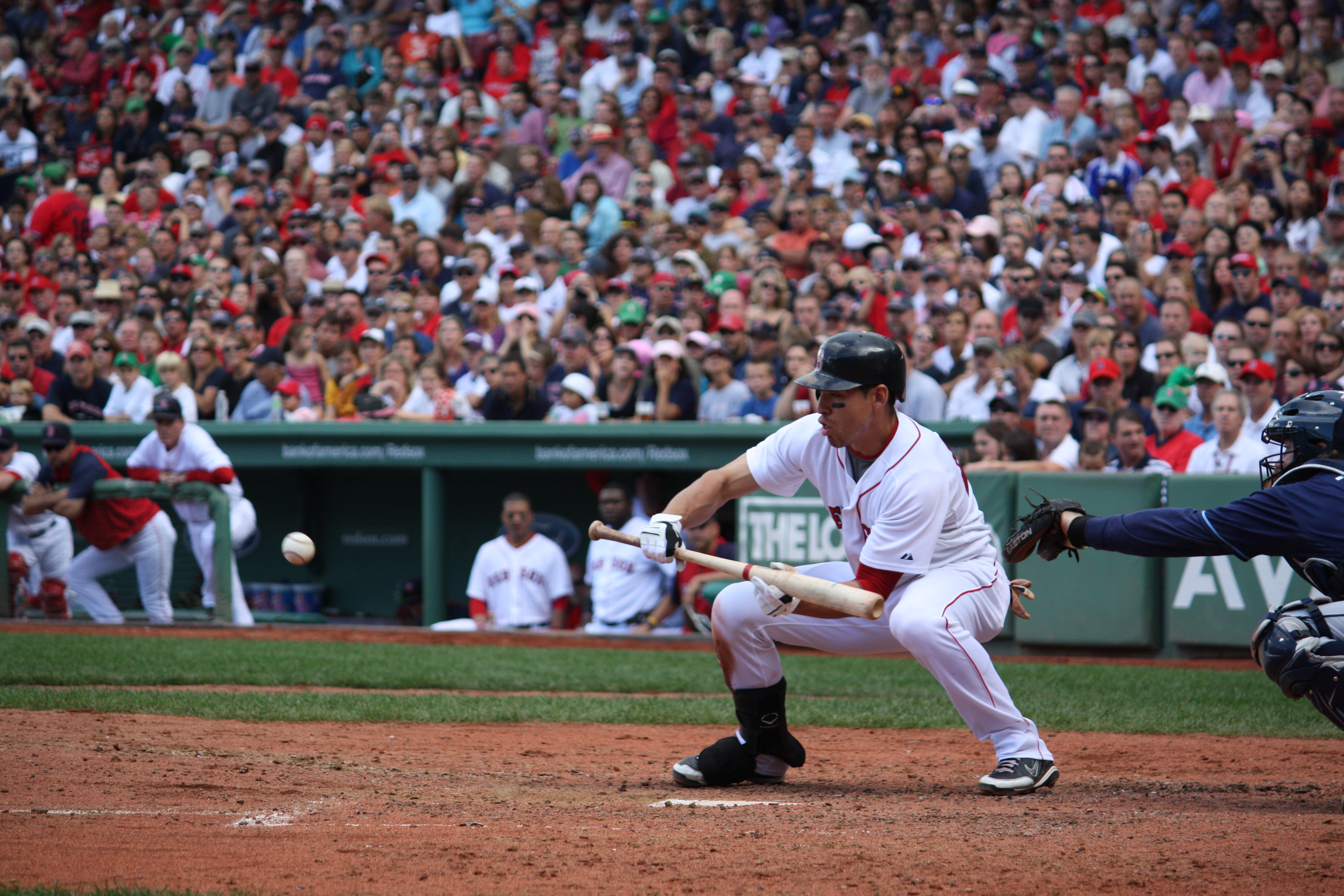
Jacoby Ellsbury bunting

Often when attempting to bunt for a base hit, the batter will begin running as he is bunting the ball. This is called a drag bunt. Left-handed batters perform this more often than right-handed hitters, because their stance in the batter's box is closer to first base, and they do not need to run across home plate, where the ball will be pitched, as they bunt.

The action of squaring to bunt is compromised during a drag bunt, as the feet are not set. Players sometimes get one hand up the barrel, and other times bunt with both hands at the base of the bat. There have been instances of one-handed drag bunts as well; Rafael Furcal has been known to try such a bunt.

=== Swinging bunt ===
A swinging bunt occurs when a poorly hit ball rolls a short distance into play, much like a bunt. A swinging bunt is often the result of a checked swing, and only has the appearance of a bunt. It is not a true bunt, and if the scorer judges that the batter intended to hit the ball, it cannot be counted as a sacrifice. There is also a "slug" bunt that is intended to surprise the opposing defense, as the desired effect is a hard-hit ball into the infield defense that is expecting a standard bunt.

=== Slap bunt ===
Slap bunting is an offensive technique wherein the batter attempts "to hit the ball to a place on the infield that's farthest from the place where the out needs to be made".

To execute slap bunting, the player is almost always in the back of the left-hand side of home plate, feet slightly open to right field, and choked up slightly on the bat. The moment the pitch is released from the pitcher's hand, the player must rotate his hips toward the pitcher and then cross his back (left) foot over his front foot, moving up to the very front edge of the batter's box. His shoulders should face the pitcher at this point. If the pitch is in the strike zone, the batter should then extend his arms so that the bat is at the correct angle for where he wants to place the ball — the barrel trailing the hands if he wants the ball to go to the left side of the field, and the opposite if he wants it to go to the right.

The technique is quite common in softball because of the difficulty of getting a hit with a pitcher only 40 feet (12 m) away. By already being in the front of the batter's box with the batter's body turned halfway toward first base, the batter already has some momentum toward first base and might be in better position to get a base hit.

The technique is often successful in sacrifice circumstances, where the placement of the ball could help advance a runner already on base. It is also often used when batters are having difficulty getting a hit off of a difficult pitcher, or when they have a better opportunity of getting on base because of the slap bunt than a hit, perhaps because of the player's running speed.

Some advanced players might perform a slap hit, which is the same technique except that the player swings to place the ball in an infield hole or over the infielders' heads.

== Fielding a bunt ==
Fielding a bunt can be more difficult than fielding a normally batted ball. Bunted balls are typically slow, so fielders must charge the ball to get to it quickly, in order to throw out a runner in time. Well-placed bunts can sometimes be impossible to field, and result in base hits. The tactic in bunting for a base hit is to hit the ball fast enough to get it past the pitcher, but slow enough to not allow time for the other infielders to make a play. Bunting a ball into no-man's land – the triangle between the locations of the pitcher, first baseman, and second baseman, or between the pitcher, catcher and third baseman – can succeed because of uncertainty among the fielders as to which should field the ball and which should receive the throw to first base. It is not unusual for all three fielders to try to field the ball, and for nobody to cover the bag, or for no one to try to field the ball, assuming someone else will handle it. Teams use a rotation play to defend against the bunt: the first baseman will charge the bunt and the second baseman "rotates" out of his usual position to cover first base and receive the throw. The shortstop covers the base towards which the runner is headed.

== Special rules ==
A foul bunt that is not caught in flight is always counted as a strike, even if it is a third strike and thus results in a strikeout of the batter. This is distinct from all other foul balls which, if not caught in flight, are only counted as a strike if not a third strike. This special exception applies only to true bunts, not on any bunt-like contacts that might occur during a full swing or check-swing. If a batter bunts the ball and his bat hits the ball again after initial contact, it is a dead ball even if by accident.

Additionally, the infield fly rule is not applied to bunts popped-up in the air. Instead, the intentional drop rule (Rule 6.05k) that also applies to line drives can be invoked.

== History ==
It is not known when the bunt was introduced; the earliest known reference to a bunt-like hit appears in the account of a game played in 1864 between the junior squads ("muffins") of the Brooklyn Excelsior and Enterprise clubs: "The feature of the play was the batting of Prof. Bassler of the Enterprise team...Being an original of the first water, he adopted an original theory in reference to batting, which we are obliged to confess is not of the most striking character. His idea is not a bad one though, it being to hit the ball slightly so as to have it drop near the home base, therefore necessitating the employment of considerable skill on the part of the pitcher to get at the ball, pick it up and throw it accurately to first base." But the batting technique now known as the bunt was almost certainly perfected by Dickey Pearce, one of baseball's early stars. For much of his career, Pearce used his 'tricky hit' to tremendous effect as the rules permitted it to roll foul and still be counted as a hit. The bunt was not common until the 1880s, and was not an accepted part of baseball strategy until the 20th century. The bunt has enjoyed periodic waves of popularity throughout baseball history, coinciding with the periodic shifts of dominance between pitching and hitting over the decades.

During periods of pitching dominance, for example, during the dead-ball era or the 1960s, bunting was an important offensive weapon. Conversely, during periods of hitting dominance, for example, the 1990s and 2000s, the value of the bunt has often been questioned. Teams following the "Moneyball" school of baseball thought (such as the Oakland Athletics, the Boston Red Sox, and the 2004–2005 Los Angeles Dodgers) have shown a tendency to shun the sacrifice bunt almost entirely. However, a canvass of the 2002–2005 World Series champions (the 2002 Los Angeles Angels being the "small ball" trendsetter for the 2000s) reveals that each team used bunting frequently in order to overcome power hitting teams. Nevertheless, the role of the bunt in baseball strategy is one of the perennial topics of discussion for baseball fans.

== Notable players with 300 or more sacrifice bunts ==
The following players have accumulated 300 or more sacrifice bunts in their playing careers:

=== Major League Baseball (MLB) ===
Player	Position	Sacrifice hits
Eddie Collins	2B	512
Jake Daubert	1B	392
John "Stuffy" McInnis	1B	383
"Wee" Willie Keeler	OF	366
Owen "Donie" Bush	SS	337
Ray Chapman	SS	334
Bill Wambsganss	2B	323
Roger Peckinpaugh	SS	314
Larry Gardner	3B	311
Tris Speaker	OF	309
Walter "Rabbit" Maranville	SS	300

Active MLB leaders (As of June 30, 2026)

1. 49: Max Scherzer (P)
2. 48: Austin Hedges (C)
3. 45: Geraldo Perdomo (SS)
4. 41: Nicky Lopez (2B)
5. 38: Patrick Corbin (P)

Nippon Professional Baseball

- 533: Masahiro Kawai (SS) (world record)

Since the beginning of the live-ball era (1920), the career leader in sacrifice bunts is Joe Sewell with 275. He was first called up by the Cleveland Indians late in the 1920 season shortly after Indians star shortstop Ray Chapman died after being hit in the head by a pitch, the event which is generally regarded as the start of the live-ball era.

== Criticism ==
Though touted as good strategy by traditionalists, the sacrifice bunt has received significant criticism by modern sabermetrics. Simply, sabermetricians argue that the value of moving a runner to another base is offset by the team's sacrificing one of its limited and valuable 27 outs. An out conceded is an out wasted, in other words.

The following stats illustrate the argument. From 1993–2010, if a team had a runner on first base with no outs, on average it would score .941 runs from that point until the end of the inning. If a team had a runner on second base with one out, however, the average was .721 runs from that point forward. Thus, if a batter walks to lead off an inning, that team will, on average, score almost one run in the inning. On the other hand, that team decreases its run expectancy by 23 percent [(1 - 0.721/0.941) * 100%] if it successfully bunts and moves the runner to second with one out.

Complicating affairs are the many difficulties and risks associated with bunting. The runner or runners on base must have speed, or the defense may get an easy force out. A manager could feasibly pinch run, but then his bench becomes smaller (that is, there are fewer substitute players available). The player at the plate must also lay down a quality bunt. That is, the player must lay down a bunt that does not pop up, go foul, or go straight to a fielder. Even if all goes well, if the sacrifice bunt is successful, the team must still get a hit to score the runner, and they now have 2 outs remaining instead of three.

Writing for Baseball Prospectus in 2004, James Click concluded that pitchers should nearly always sacrifice bunt when the option is available to them, and that most position players should sacrifice bunt with a runner on second and no outs in situations where scoring at least one run is more important than maximizing run output (i.e. in the late innings of a close game). In all other situations, he found that sacrifice bunting hurts the sacrificing team more than it helps.
