= Yasuo Fujii =

Japanese baseball player (born 1962)

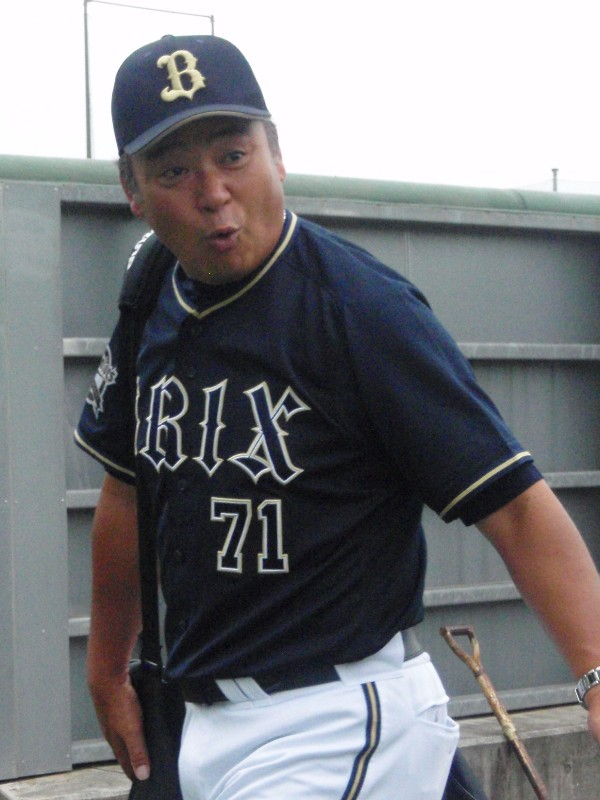

Chunichi Dragons – No. 96
- Outfielder / Coach
- Born: July 27, 1962 (age 63); Fukuyama, Hiroshima, Japan
- Batted: Left Threw: Right

NPB debut
- April 10, 1987, for the Hankyu Braves

Last NPB appearance
- October 13, 2002, for the Orix BlueWave

NPB statistics
- Batting average: .252
- Home runs: 282
- Hits: 1,207
- Stats at Baseball Reference

Teams
- As player: Hankyu Braves/Orix Braves/Orix BlueWave (1987–2002); As coach: Orix BlueWave/Orix Buffaloes (2003–2006, 2009, 2018-2019); Fukuoka SoftBank Hawks (2011–2017); Hanshin Tigers (2022); Chunichi Dragons (2026-)

Career highlights and awards
- 1× Japan Series champion (1996); 1× NPB All-Star (1989); 2× Best Nine Award (1989, 1993)
- Last updated on: 22 January 2022

Yasuo Fujii (藤井 康雄, Fujii Yasuo; born July 7, 1962 in Fukuyama, Hiroshima, Japan) is a former Nippon Professional Baseball outfielder.
