= Shinichi Murata =

Japanese baseball player and coach (born 1963)

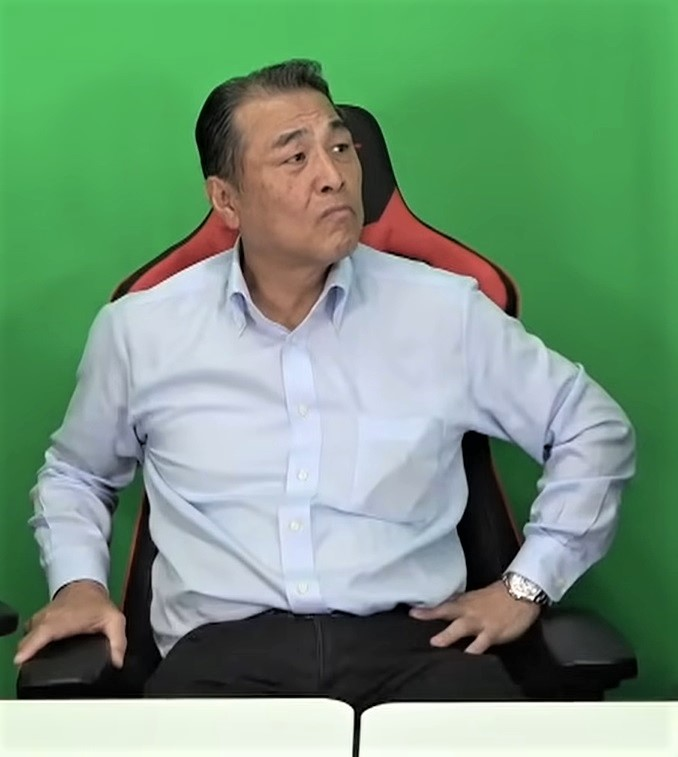
- Murata in 2020
- Catcher / Coach
- Born: December 5, 1963 (age 62); Kobe, Hyōgo, Japan
- Batted: Right Threw: Right

NPB debut
- May 12, 1984, for the Yomiuri Giants

Last NPB appearance
- October 1, 2001, for the Yomiuri Giants

NPB statistics (through 2001)
- Batting average: .234
- Home runs: 98
- Hits: 673
- Stats at Baseball Reference

Teams
- As player: Yomiuri Giants (1982–2001); As coach: Yomiuri Giants (2002–2003, 2006–2018)

Career highlights and awards
- 1× Best Nine Award (1990); 2× NPB All-Star (1994-1995); 3x Japan Series champion (1989, 1994, 2000)

Shinichi Murata (村田 真一, Murata Shinichi; born December 5, 1963 in Kobe, Hyōgo, Japan) is a professional Japanese baseball player.
