= 1989 Nippon Professional Baseball season =

1989 NPB season
- League: Nippon Professional Baseball
- Sport: Baseball

Regular season
- Season MVP: CL: Warren Cromartie (YOM); PL: Ralph Bryant (KIN)

League postseason
- CL champions: Yomiuri Giants
- CL runners-up: Hiroshima Toyo Carp
- PL champions: Kintetsu Buffaloes
- PL runners-up: Orix Braves

Japan Series
- Champions: Yomiuri Giants
- Runners-up: Kintetsu Buffaloes
- Finals MVP: Norihiro Komada (YOM)

NPB seasons
- ← 1988 1990 →

The 1989 Nippon Professional Baseball season was the 40th season of operation for the league.

== Regular season standings ==
=== Central League ===
Central League	G	W	L	T	Pct.	GB
Yomiuri Giants	130	84	44	2	.656	--
Hiroshima Toyo Carp	130	73	51	6	.589	9.0
Chunichi Dragons	130	68	59	3	.535	15.5
Yakult Swallows	130	55	72	3	.433	28.5
Hanshin Tigers	130	54	75	1	.419	30.5
Yokohama Taiyo Whales	130	47	80	3	.370	36.5

=== Pacific League ===
Pacific League	G	W	L	T	Pct.	GB
Kintetsu Buffaloes	130	71	54	5	.568	--
Orix Braves	130	72	55	3	.567	0.0
Seibu Lions	130	69	53	8	.566	0.5
Fukuoka Daiei Hawks	130	59	64	7	.480	11.0
Nippon-Ham Fighters	130	54	73	3	.425	18.0
Lotte Orions	130	48	74	8	.393	21.5

== Japan Series ==
CL Yomiuri Giants (4) vs. PL Kintetsu Buffaloes (3)

Game	Date	Score	Location	Time	Attendance
1	October 21	Yomiuri Giants – 3, Kintetsu Buffaloes – 4	Fujiidera Stadium	2:40	23,477
2	October 22	Yomiuri Giants – 3, Kintetsu Buffaloes – 6	Fujiidera Stadium	3:40	24,207
3	October 24	Kintetsu Buffaloes – 3, Yomiuri Giants – 0	Tokyo Dome	2:50	45,711
4	October 25	Kintetsu Buffaloes – 0, Yomiuri Giants – 5	Tokyo Dome	3:05	45,825
5	October 26	Kintetsu Buffaloes – 1, Yomiuri Giants – 6	Tokyo Dome	3:01	45,717
6	October 28	Yomiuri Giants – 3, Kintetsu Buffaloes – 1	Fujiidera Stadium	3:31	23,030
7	October 29	Yomiuri Giants – 8, Kintetsu Buffaloes – 5	Fujiidera Stadium	3:11	23,091

== See also ==
- 1989 Major League Baseball season
