= Hisanori Yokota =

Japanese baseball player and coach (born 1967)

TSG Hawks – No. 34
- Pitcher / Coach
- Born: September 8, 1967 (age 58); Wakayama, Wakayama, Japan
- Batted: Left Threw: Right

Professional debut
- NPB: April 12, 1987, for the Seibu Lions
- CPBL: March 2, 2003, for the Seibu Lions

Last appearance
- NPB: June 15, 2002, for the Hanshin Tigers
- CPBL: October 30, 2004, for the Brother Elephants

NPB statistics
- Win–loss record: 26–43
- Earned run average: 3.57
- Strikeouts: 421

CPBL statistics
- Win–loss record: 25–11
- Earned run average: 3.10
- Strikeouts: 322
- Stats at Baseball Reference

Teams
- As player: Seibu Lions (1986–2000); Chiba Lotte Marines (2001); Hanshin Tigers (2002); Brother Elephants (2003–2004); As coach: Brother Elephants (2005–2006); Saitama Seibu Lions (2012–2016); TSG Hawks (2023–)

Hisanori Yokota (横田 久則, Yokota Hisanori; born September 8, 1967) is a Japanese former professional baseball pitcher and current pitching coach of the TSG Hawks of Taiwan's Chinese Professional Baseball League (CPBL). He played in Nippon Professional Baseball for the Seibu Lions, Chiba Lotte Marines, and Hanshin Tigers, and in the Chinese Professional Baseball League (CPBL) for the Brother Elephants.
