= Katsuhiro Nakamura =

Japanese baseball player, coach, and manager

- Second baseman
- Born: June 6, 1949; Kujūkuri, Chiba, Japan
- Died: September 23, 2015 (aged 66); Tokyo, Japan
- Batted: Right Threw: Right

NPB debut
- April 9, 1972, for the Hanshin Tigers

Last NPB appearance
- August 28, 1982, for the Hanshin Tigers

NPB statistics (through 1982)
- Batting average: .246
- Home runs: 76
- Hits: 648
- Stats at Baseball Reference

Teams
- As player: Hanshin Tigers (1972–1982); As manager: Hanshin Tigers (1990–1995); Orix Buffaloes (2006); As coach: Hanshin Tigers (1980–1988)

Career highlights and awards
- 3× NPB All-Star (1972, 1975, 1977)

Katsuhiro Nakamura (中村 勝広, Nakamura Katsuhiro; June 6, 1949 - September 23, 2015) was a professional Japanese baseball player, coach, and manager.
