= Yukinaga Maeda =

Japanese baseball player

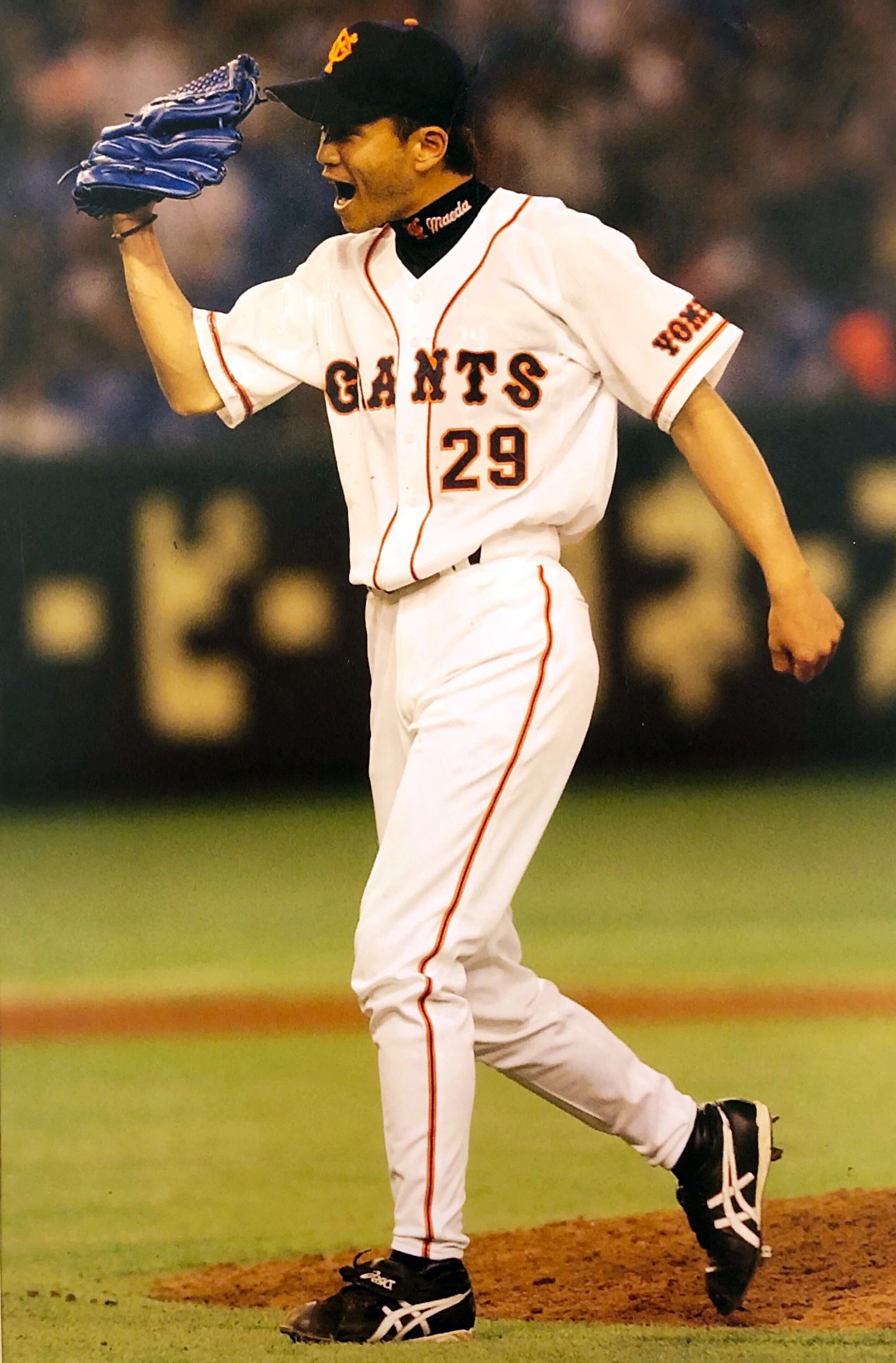
- Pitcher
- Born: August 26, 1970 (age 55); Chikushi District, Fukuoka, Japan
- Batted: Left Threw: Left

NPB debut
- April 15, 1989, for the Lotte Orions

Last NPB appearance
- September 12, 2007, for the Yomiuri Giants

NPB statistics (through 2007)
- Win–loss record: 78-110
- Saves: 9
- ERA: 4.17
- Strikeouts: 1241

Teams
- Lotte Orions/Chiba Lotte Marines (1989–1995); Chunichi Dragons (1996–2001); Yomiuri Giants (2002–2007)

Career highlights and awards
- 1× NPB All-Star (1992)

Yukinaga Maeda (前田 幸長, Maeda Yukinaga; born August 26, 1970 in Chikushi District, Fukuoka, Japan) is a professional Japanese baseball player.
