= Takanori Suzuki =

Japanese baseball player and coach (born 1972)

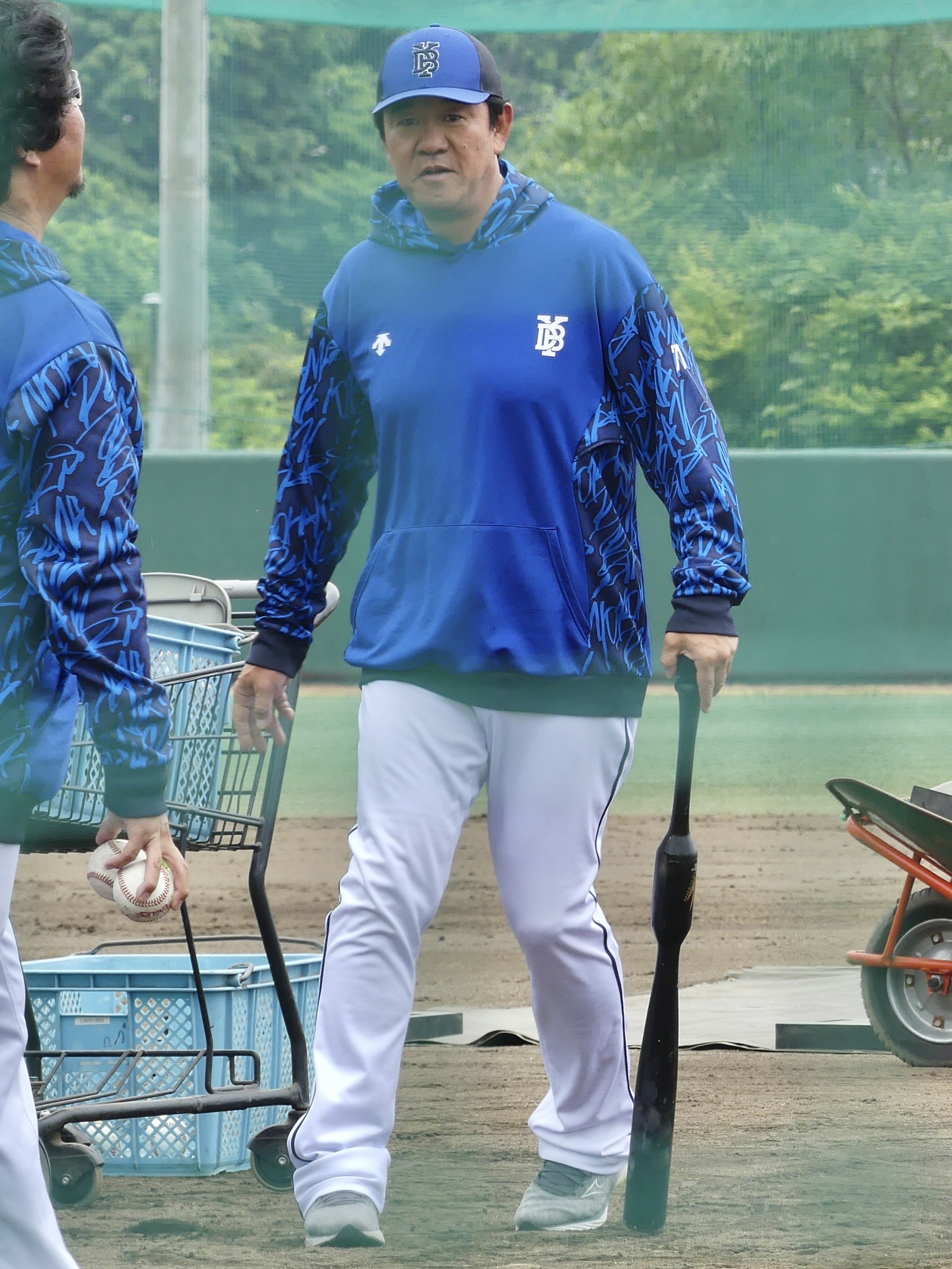

Yokohama DeNA BayStars – No. 77
- Outfielder / Coach
- Born: April 10, 1972 (age 53); Hamamatsu, Japan
- Batted: Left Threw: Right

NPB debut
- October 14, 1991, for the Yokohama Taiyo Whales

Last NPB appearance
- October 12, 2008, for the Yokohama BayStars

NPB statistics
- Batting average: .303
- Home runs: 146
- Hits: 1456
- Stats at Baseball Reference

Teams
- As player: Yokohama Taiyo Whales/Yokohama BayStars (1991–2008); As manager: Kanagawa Future Dreams (2020–2021); As coach: Yokohama BayStars (2009–2010); Yokohama DeNA BayStars (2022–present)

Career highlights and awards
- 4× NPB All-Star (1997–1999, 2001); 2× Best Nine Award (1997, 1998); 2× Central League batting champion (1997, 1998); Japan Series champion (1998); Japan Series Most Valuable Player Award (1998)

Takanori Suzuki (鈴木 尚典, born April 10, 1972) is a former Nippon Professional Baseball outfielder.
