= Robert Whiting =

American sportswriter (born 1942)

Robert Whiting (born October 24, 1942) is an American author and journalist who has written several books on contemporary Japanese culture—which include topics such as baseball and American gangsters operating in Japan. He was born in New Jersey, grew up in Eureka, California and graduated from Sophia University in Tokyo. He has lived largely in Japan since arriving there in 1962; he divides his time between homes in Tokyo and California.

== Background since relocating to Japan ==
Whiting first came to Japan with U.S. Air Force Intelligence in 1962. Whiting was assigned to work for the National Security Agency in the U-2 program in Fuchu, Tokyo. He was offered a job working for the NSA when his tour with the Air Force was about to end, but he chose instead to study at Tokyo's Sophia University, where he majored in Political Science.

In order to supplement his income while studying on the GI Bill, Whiting tutored Tsuneo Watanabe in English. Watanabe was a reporter for the Yomiuri Shimbun at that time, but is now (as of 2019) the Chairman of the Board of the newspaper - which has the highest circulation in the world.

Whiting wrote his thesis on the factions of Japan's Liberal Democratic Party.

Whiting graduated from Sophia in 1969.

Whiting's research into the ties binding Japan's leading politicians to yakuza bosses gained him entrée into the Higashi Nakano wing of Tokyo's largest criminal gang, the Sumiyoshi-kai, where he became an "informal advisor".

He worked for Encyclopædia Britannica Japan as an editor until 1972, until in his words, he "got bored of being a gaijin" and moved to New York City, where he wrote his first book, The Chrysanthemum and the Bat. He later returned to Tokyo and worked for Time-Life for a year before becoming a free-lance author.

== Writing career ==
Whiting's works on baseball include The Chrysanthemum and the Bat: The Game Japanese Play (Dodd, Mead, N.Y. 1977), You Gotta Have Wa (1989 Macmillan, 1990, 2009 Vintage Departures), Slugging It Out In Japan: An American Major Leaguer in the Tokyo Outfield (1991), and The Meaning of Ichiro: The New Wave from Japan and the Transformation of Our National Pastime (2004), all of which have been published in English and Japanese.

You Gotta Have Wa is a work about Japanese society as seen through their adopted sport of baseball. It was a Book of the Month Club selection and a Casey Award finalist. While the San Francisco Chronicle described it as "one of the best-written sports books ever"), it examines larger issues concerning Japan as well. David Halberstam stated that "What you read (in You Gotta Have Wa) is applicable to almost every other dimension of American-Japanese relations." The book sold 125,000 copies in hardcover and trade paperback and is in its 23rd printing. It was published in Japanese by Kadokawa under the title Wa Wo Motte Nihon To Nasu. It sold 200,000 copies in hardcover and paperback editions.

Whiting, under the pen name "Guy Jeans" (a pun on the word gaijin), co-authored the manga series Reggie with artist Minoru Hiramatsu, a story about a Black American Major League player who joins a Japanese baseball team. It was serialized in Kodansha's Morning magazine from 1991 to 1994.

Tokyo Junkie was published in 2021.

The Chrysanthemum and the Bat was chosen by TIME Magazine editorial staff as the best sports book of the year. Published in Japanese by Simul Publishing Company, as Kiku to Batto it was reissued in 2005 by Hayakawa Shoten Publishing.

Warren Cromartie's autobiography, Slugging It Out In Japan (Kodansha International, Tokyo 1991), was co-authored by Whiting. The book was the recipient of a New York Public Library award for educational merit.

The Meaning of Ichiro, was published by Warner Books in 2004, and excerpted in Sports Illustrated. It sold 25,000 copies. The Japanese translation, Ichiro Kakumei was published by Hayakawa Shoten. A revised and updated edition of The Meaning of Ichiro, entitled The Samurai Way of Baseball, was published in trade-paperback form by Warner Books in April, 2005.

Whiting's most popular work is the nonfiction Tokyo Underworld: The Fast Times and Hard Life of an American Gangster in Japan (Pantheon, N.Y. 1999, Vintage Departures, 2000), an account of organized crime in Japan and the corrupt side of U.S.-Japan relations. Mario Puzo described the book as "a fascinating look at...fascinating people who show how democracy advances hand in hand with crime in Japan." It was a best-seller on many lists in Tokyo when published in translated form by Kadokawa, selling over 300,000 copies in hardcover and paperback in Japan alone, and was chosen as one of the top ten books on Japan (at number two) in an article by the scholar Jeff Kingston, writing in the #1 Shimbun.

Tokyo Underworld was reported in 2009 and 2012 as being developed for film or television, with Whiting working as a consultant on the project, but nothing had been produced as of 2018.

A sequel to Tokyo Underworld, Tokyo Outsiders - about foreign criminals in the Japanese underworld - has been published in Japanese.

His biography of the Japanese pitcher, Hideo Nomo, who played in the US Major Leagues and was National League Rookie of the Year in 1995. The book was published in 2011 by PHP in Japanese.

The English-language The Book of Nomo was published in January 2017.

Whiting's book ふたつのオリンピック、東京1964/2020 (The Two Tokyo Olympics: 1964/2020) was published in Japanese by Kadokawa in 2018.

Whiting has been published in The New York Times, The Smithsonian, Sports Illustrated, Newsweek, TIME, and U.S. News & World Report. He is also one of very few Westerners to write regular columns in the Japanese press. From 1979-1985, he was a columnist for the Japanese language Daily Sports. From 1988 to 1992, he wrote a weekly column for the popular magazine Shukan Asahi. From 1990-1993, he was a reporter/commentator for News Station, the top-rated news program in Japan. From 2007-2025 he wrote a weekly column for Yukan Fuji, a former major evening daily newspaper in Japan. He has written extensively on current issues impacting both Nippon Professional Baseball and Major League Baseball, including a four-part series, which was published in the Japan Times, followed by an in-depth series on Sadaharu Oh, Trey Hillman, Bobby Valentine and Hideo Nomo for the same paper.

In October 2011, he wrote a three-part series for The Japan Times on Japanese pitcher Hideki Irabu, who had died in California two months earlier of an apparent suicide. In his works he not only examines how different cultures have influenced the game of baseball, but how the game of baseball has helped influence and shape cultural identity across the globe. He is also a commentator on the influence of the yakuza on the Japanese power structure and the dark side of Japanese-American relations since the end of the Second World War.

In April 2005, Whiting was honored with a Lifetime Achievement Award by the Foreign Sportswriters Association of Japan.

You Gotta Have Wa and Slugging It Out in Japan appeared in the book, 501 Baseball Books Fans Must Read Before They Die (University of Nebraska Press, 2013).

In January 2022, Whiting launched his own Substack site "Robert Whiting's Japan" which features both his regular writing and podcast.

== Tokyo Giants controversies and banning from Tokyo Dome ==
Whiting was banned from the Tokyo Dome for two years in 1987 after publishing an interview with Warren Cromartie in the Japanese magazine Penthouse, in which Cromartie criticized Yomiuri Giants front office executives.

He was banned again, indefinitely, in 1990, after writing an investigative report for the magazine Shukan Asahi, which showed the Giants were falsifying attendance figures. The Yomiuri front office had claimed that every Giants home game played in the Tokyo Dome drew a capacity crowd of 56,000. However, Whiting counted the seats, which totaled 42,761, and then the standing room at several Giants games, which averaged 3,500, demonstrating that the maximum audience for a baseball game could not have been much more than 46,000. Whiting returned to the Dome for the first time as a reporter in 2004 to cover an Opening Day match between the New York Yankees and the Tampa Bay Rays.

== Family ==
Whiting is married to Machiko Kondo, who is a retired officer for the United Nations High Commissioner for Refugees (UNHCR).
