= Yui Tomori =

Japanese baseball player and coach

Yui Tomori Denney Tomori
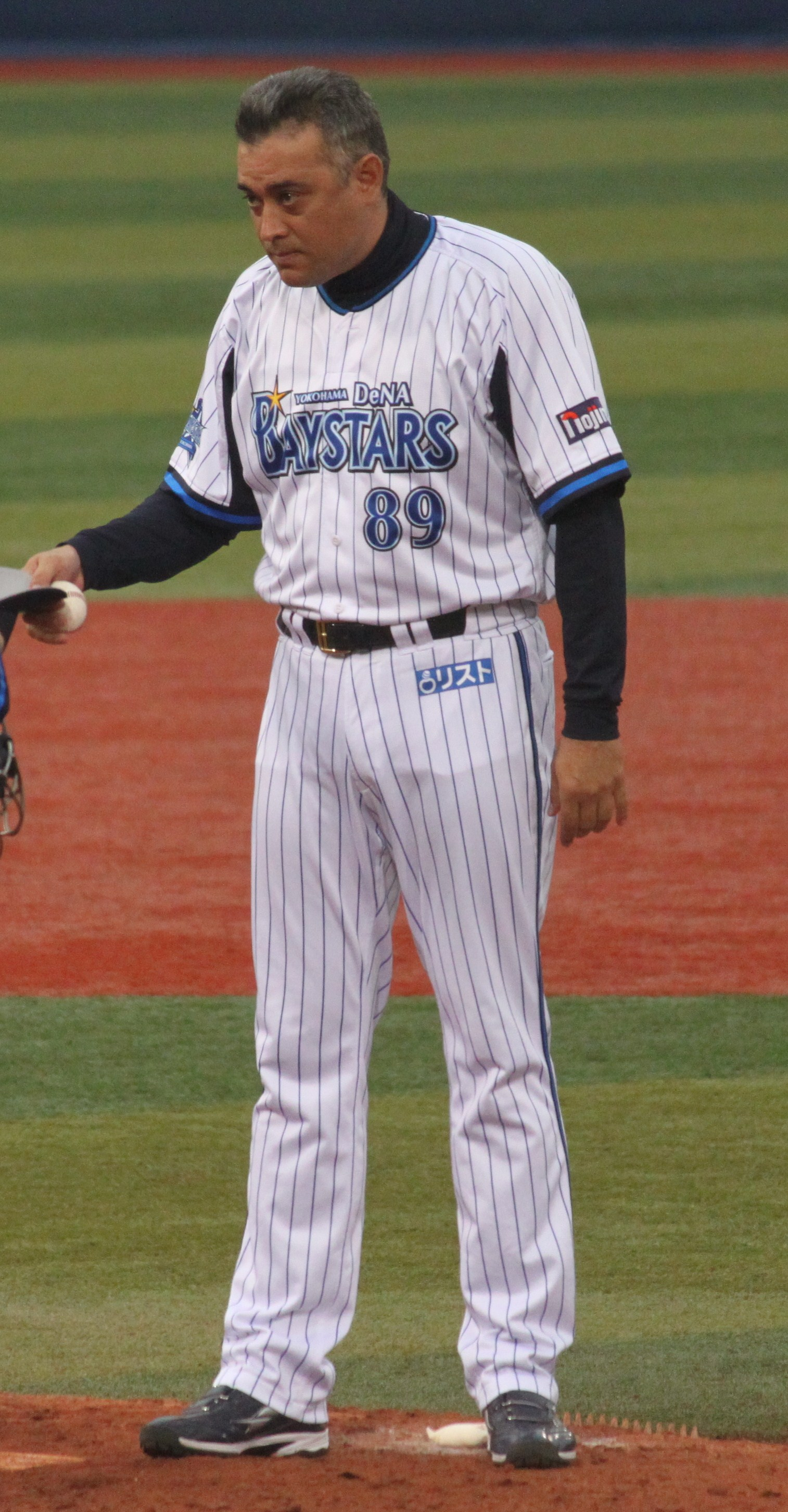
- Denny at Yokohama DeNA BayStars in 2012
- Pitcher / Scout
- Born: September 21, 1967 (age 58); Urasoe, Okinawa, Japan
- Batted: Right Threw: Right

NPB debut
- October 8, 1987, for the Yokohama Taiyō Whales

Last NPB appearance
- October 4, 2007, for the Chunichi Dragons

NPB statistics (through 2007)
- Win–loss record: 18-29
- Saves: 30
- ERA: 3.89
- Strikeouts: 420
- Stats at Baseball Reference

Teams
- As player: Yokohama Taiyō Whales/Yokohama BayStars (1987–1996, 2003–2004); Seibu Lions (1997–2002); Chunichi Dragons (2006–2007); As coach: Yokohama DeNA BayStars (2012–2013); Chunichi Dragons (2014–2017); As scout: Chunichi Dragons (2017–2019)

Career highlights and awards
- 1x NPB All-Star (1998)
- Last updated on: 4 February 2018

Yui Tomori (友利 結, Tomori Yui; born September 21, 1967 in Urasoe, Okinawa, Japan) also known as Denney Tomori (デニー 友利) or Denney (デニー) is a former Nippon Professional Baseball pitcher.
