= Fujiidera Stadium =

Multi-use stadium in Fujiidera, Osaka, Japan

- Buffaloes Stadium
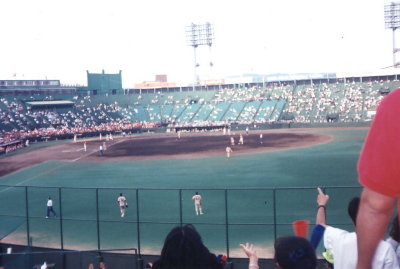
- From an outfield seat, September 1992
- Interactive map of Fujiidera Stadium
- Full name: Kintetsu Fujiidera Baseball Stadium
- Location: Fujiidera, Osaka, Japan
- Coordinates: 34.570325°N 135.590708°E
- Owner: Kintetsu Kogyo (subsidiary of Kintetsu)
- Capacity: 32,000
- Surface: Grass
- Scoreboard: Yes
- Field size: Left field: 91 m Center: 120 m Right field: 91 m

Construction
- Opened: May 25, 1928
- Closed: January 31, 2005
- Demolished: February–August 2006
- Architect: Zenitaka Corporation
- Main contractor: Zenitaka Corporation

Tenant
- Kintetsu Buffaloes (1984–1996)

Fujiidera Stadium (近鉄藤井寺球場) was a multi-use stadium in Fujiidera, Osaka, Japan. It was used mostly for baseball and was the home of the Kintetsu Buffaloes prior to the Osaka Dome opening in 1997. The stadium had a capacity of 32,000 people. The stadium was built in 1928, and closed in 2005. The site has since been redeveloped, and is now the home of the elementary school branch of Shitennoji International Buddhist University.

== See also ==
- Fujiidera Station - Minami Osaka Line

Preceded by Nissay Stadium	Home of the Kintetsu Buffaloes; 1984 – 1996	Succeeded by Osaka Dome
