= Norihiro Komada =

Japanese baseball player (born 1962)

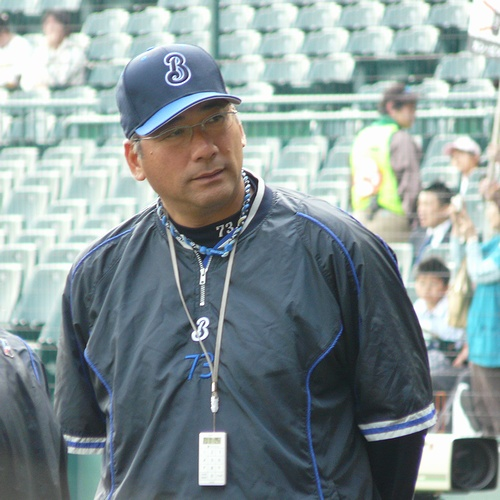
- First baseman / Coach
- Born: September 14, 1962 (age 63); Shiki District, Nara, Japan
- Batted: Left Threw: Left

NPB debut
- April 10, 1983, for the Yomiuri Giants

Last NPB appearance
- October 10, 2000, for the Yokohama BayStars

NPB statistics
- Batting average: .289
- Home runs: 195
- Hits: 2,006
- Stats at Baseball Reference

Teams
- As player: Yomiuri Giants (1981–1993); Yokohama BayStars (1994–2000); As coach: Tohoku Rakuten Golden Eagles (2005); Yokohama BayStars (2009); Yomiuri Giants (2022–2025); As manager: Kōchi Fighting Dogs (2016–2019)

Career highlights and awards
- 6× NPB All-Star (1990–1992, 1995, 1997–1998); Best Nine Award (1998); 10× Mitsui Golden Glove Award (1989–1991, 1993–1999); 2× NPB All-Star Game MVP (1992 Game 3); 2× Japan Series champion (1989, 1998); Japan Series Most Valuable Player Award (1989)

Norihiro Komada (駒田 徳広, born September 14, 1962, in Shiki District, Nara, Japan) is a former Nippon Professional Baseball infielder.

On April 10, 1983, making his major league debut, Komada hit a grand slam off Kazuhiko Migita of the Taiyo Whales. He is the first and currently only NPB player to hit a grand slam in their first career at-bat. Known as "Mr. Grand Slam", he went on to hit 13 grand slams as a player. He is one of 56 members of the 2,000 hit club.

== See also ==
- List of Nippon Professional Baseball career hits leaders
