= Isao Koda =

Japanese baseball player and coach

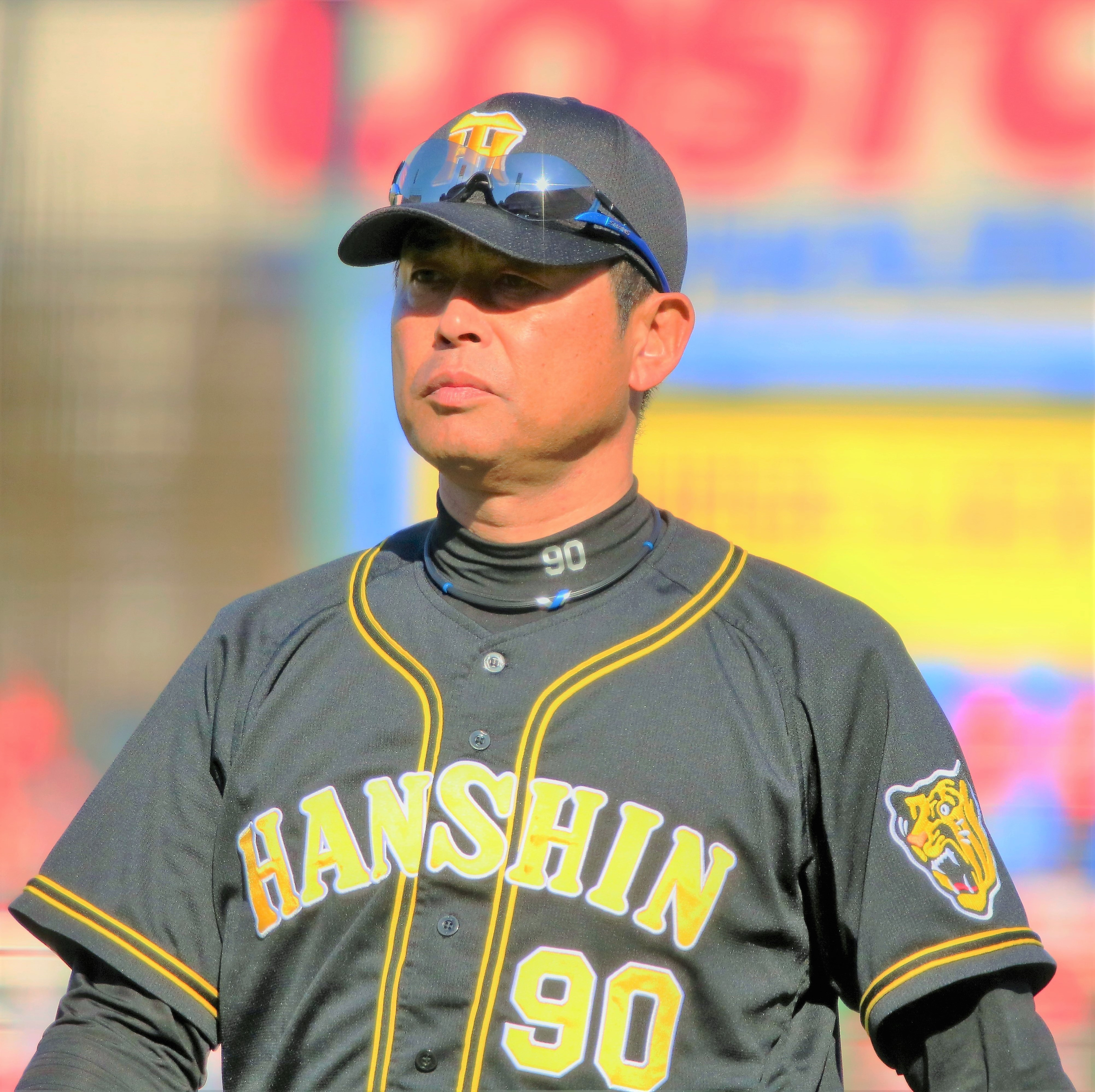
- Pitcher / Coach
- Born: May 29, 1965 (age 60); Higashisonogi, Nagasaki, Japan
- Bats: Left Throws: Right

NPB debut
- June 9, 1985, for the Yomiuri Giants

NPB statistics (through 2001 season)
- Win–loss record: 67-54
- Saves: 11
- ERA: 3.82
- Strikeouts: 738

Teams
- As player: Yomiuri Giants (1984–1994); Kintetsu Buffaloes/Osaka Kintetsu Buffaloes (1995–2001); As coach: Osaka Kintetsu Buffaloes (2002–2003); Yomiuri Giants (2004–2011); Doosan Bears (2013–2014); Hanshin Tigers (2015–2020)
- Last updated on: February 2, 2021

Isao Koda (香田 勲男, Kōda Isao; born May 29, 1965) is a former Japanese Nippon Professional Baseball pitcher. He played for the Yomiuri Giants from 1985 to 1994 and the Osaka Kintetsu Buffaloes from 1995 to 2001. He won a career high 11 games in 1990.
