= Kaoru Okazaki =

Japanese baseball player and coach

- Infielder / Coach
- Born: June 7, 1961; Ōita, Ōita, Japan
- Batted: Left Threw: Right

NPB debut
- October 5, 1982, for the Yomiuri Giants

Last appearance
- October 8, 1996, for the Yomiuri Giants

NPB statistics (through 1996)
- Batting average: .260
- Hits: 112
- Home runs: 63
- Runs batted in: 906
- Stolen base: 23
- Stats at Baseball Reference

Teams
- As player: Yomiuri Giants (1980–1996); As coach: Yomiuri Giants (2006–2015)

Career highlights and awards
- 4× NPB All-Star (1989 - 1992); 1× Mitsui Golden Glove Award (1990); 3× Japan Series champion (1981, 1989, 1994)
- Last updated on: 5 May 2020

Kaoru Okazaki (岡崎 郁, Okazaki Kaoru; born June 7, 1961) is a Japanese former Nippon Professional Baseball infielder.
