= 1990 Nippon Professional Baseball season =

1990 NPB season
- League: Nippon Professional Baseball
- Sport: Baseball

Regular season
- Season MVP: CL: Masaki Saito (YOM); PL: Hideo Nomo (KIN)

League postseason
- CL champions: Yomiuri Giants
- CL runners-up: Hiroshima Toyo Carp
- PL champions: Seibu Lions
- PL runners-up: Orix Braves

Japan Series
- Champions: Seibu Lions
- Runners-up: Yomiuri Giants
- Finals MVP: Orestes Destrade (SEI)

NPB seasons
- ← 1989 1991 →

The 1990 Nippon Professional Baseball season was the 41st season of operation for the league.

== Regular season standings ==
=== Central League ===
Central League	G	W	L	T	Pct.	GB
Yomiuri Giants	130	88	42	0	.677	–
Hiroshima Toyo Carp	132	66	64	2	.508	22.0
Yokohama Taiyo Whales	133	64	66	3	.492	24.0
Chunichi Dragons	131	62	68	1	.477	26.0
Yakult Swallows	130	58	72	0	.446	30.0
Hanshin Tigers	130	52	78	0	.400	36.0

=== Pacific League ===
Pacific League	G	W	L	T	Pct.	GB
Seibu Lions	130	81	45	4	.643	–
Orix Braves	130	69	57	4	.548	12.0
Kintetsu Buffaloes	130	67	60	3	.528	14.5
Nippon-Ham Fighters	130	66	63	1	.512	16.5
Lotte Orions	130	57	71	2	.445	25.0
Fukuoka Daiei Hawks	130	41	85	4	.325	40.0

== Japan Series ==
PL Seibu Lions (4) vs. CL Yomiuri Giants (0)

Game	Date	Score	Location	Time	Attendance
1	October 20	Seibu Lions – 5, Yomiuri Giants – 0	Tokyo Dome	2:58	46,008
2	October 21	Seibu Lions – 9, Yomiuri Giants – 5	Tokyo Dome	3:36	46,153
3	October 23	Yomiuri Giants – 0, Seibu Lions – 7	Seibu Lions Stadium	2:48	31,804
4	October 24	Yomiuri Giants – 3, Seibu Lions – 7	Seibu Lions Stadium	3:15	31,804

== See also ==
- 1990 Major League Baseball season
