= Kazutomo Miyamoto =

Japanese baseball player (born 1964)

- Pitcher / Coach
- Born: February 13, 1964 (age 62)
- Batted: Left Threw: Left

NPB debut
- June 15, 1985, for the Yomiuri Giants

Last appearance
- September 28, 1997, for the Yomiuri Giants

NPB statistics (through 1997)
- Win–loss record: 66-62
- ERA: 3.60
- Strikeouts: 967
- Stats at Baseball Reference

Teams
- As player: Yomiuri Giants (1985–1997); As coach: Yomiuri Giants (2019–2021)
Medals
Men's baseball
Representing Japan
Olympics
| Gold medal – first place | 1984 Los Angeles | Team competition |

Kazutomo Miyamoto (宮本 和知, Miyamoto Kazutomo; born February 13, 1964) is a Japanese retired professional pitcher.
