= 1998 Nippon Professional Baseball season =

1998 NPB season
- League: Nippon Professional Baseball
- Sport: Baseball

Regular season
- Season MVP: CL: Kazuhiro Sasaki (YOK); PL: Kazuo Matsui (SEI)

League postseason
- CL champions: Yokohama BayStars
- CL runners-up: Chunichi Dragons
- PL champions: Seibu Lions
- PL runners-up: Nippon-Ham Fighters

Japan Series
- Champions: Yokohama BayStars
- Runners-up: Seibu Lions
- Finals MVP: Takanori Suzuki (YOK)

NPB seasons
- ← 1997 1999 →

The 1998 Nippon Professional Baseball season was the 49th season of operation for the league.

== Regular season standings ==
=== Central League ===
Central League	G	W	L	T	Pct.	GB
Yokohama BayStars	136	79	56	1	.585	--
Chunichi Dragons	136	75	60	1	.556	4.0
Yomiuri Giants	135	73	62	0	.541	6.0
Yakult Swallows	135	66	69	0	.489	13.0
Hiroshima Toyo Carp	135	60	75	0	.444	19.0
Hanshin Tigers	135	52	83	0	.385	27.0

=== Pacific League ===
Pacific League	G	W	L	T	Pct.	GB
Seibu Lions	135	70	61	4	.534	--
Nippon-Ham Fighters	135	67	65	3	.508	3.5
Orix BlueWave	135	66	66	3	.500	4.5
Fukuoka Daiei Hawks	135	67	67	1	.500	4.5
Kintetsu Buffaloes	135	66	67	2	.496	5.0
Chiba Lotte Marines	135	61	71	3	.462	9.5

== Japan Series ==
Game	Score	Date	Location	Attendance
1	BayStars – 9, Lions – 4	October 18	Yokohama Stadium	29,025
2	BayStars – 4, Lions – 0	October 19	Yokohama Stadium	29,076
3	Lions – 7, BayStars – 2	October 22	Seibu Dome	31,599
4	Lions – 4, BayStars – 2	October 23	Seibu Dome	31,685
5	Lions – 5, BayStars – 17	October 24	Seibu Dome	31,756
6	BayStars – 2, Lions – 1	October 26	Yokohama Stadium	29,289

== See also ==
- 1998 Major League Baseball season
