= Kōshien baseball tournaments =

High school baseball tournaments held in Japan

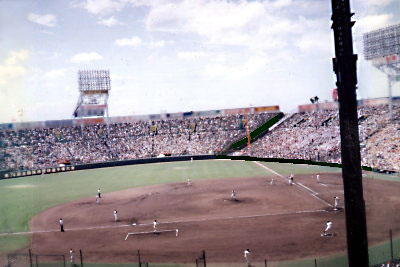
Hanshin Kōshien Stadium during the 1992 Kōshien tournament

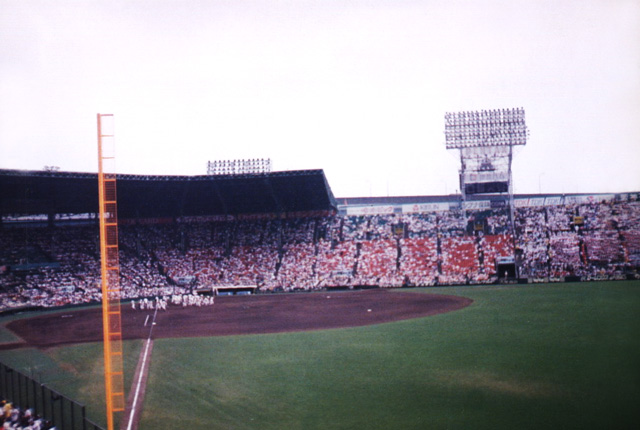
View from the Alps stands

In Japan, Kōshien (甲子園) generally refers to the two annual baseball tournaments played by high schools nationwide culminating at a final showdown at Hanshin Kōshien Stadium in Nishinomiya, Hyogo, Japan. They are organized by the Japan High School Baseball Federation in association with Mainichi Shimbun for the National High School Baseball Invitational Tournament in the spring (also known as "Spring Kōshien") and Asahi Shimbun for the National High School Baseball Championship in the summer (also known as "Summer Kōshien").

Both of these nationwide tournaments enjoy widespread popularity similar to that of NCAA March Madness in the United States, arguably equal to or greater than professional baseball. Summer qualifying tournaments are televised locally and each game of the Spring and Summer tournaments at Kōshien are televised nationally on NHK alongside the TV channels associated with the newspapers organizing the tournaments. The tournaments have gone on to become national traditions, and large numbers of frenzied students and parents travel from their hometowns to cheer for their local team. It is common to see players walking off the field in tears after being eliminated from the tournament by a loss, especially during the Summer Tournament. It symbolizes the third-year players' retirement from high school baseball.

The star players of the championship team achieve a degree of celebrity status. For players, playing at Kōshien becomes a gateway to playing at the professional level. Due to the recruiting practices of Japanese high schools, top prospects often play on strong teams that were able to reach the final tournament at Kōshien. Many professional baseball players first made their mark at Kōshien, including Eiji Bandō, Sadaharu Oh, Koji Ota, Suguru Egawa, Masumi Kuwata, Kazuhiro Kiyohara, Hideki Matsui, Daisuke Matsuzaka, Yu Darvish, Masahiro Tanaka, Yusei Kikuchi, and Shohei Ohtani.

== Background ==
There are two main tournaments:

- Japanese High School Baseball Invitational Tournament ("Spring Kōshien")
- Japanese High School Baseball Championship ("Summer Kōshien")

In addition, there is a separate and less well-known Meiji Jingu Baseball Tournament held each year in November at Jingu Baseball Stadium in Tokyo. Beginning with the 2002 tournament, the region of the winning school receives one extra bid in the following Spring tournament at Kōshien; this bid is typically given to the winning school as a matter of respect.

== Particulars ==
In the week preceding the tournament in spring and summer, teams who have won a spot in the tournament each hold a 30-minute practice on the grounds of Hanshin Kōshien Stadium. This is mainly to help the players adjust to the environment of the stadium. In the summer, due to scheduling conflicts with the Hanshin Tigers of Nippon Professional Baseball, the Tigers are forced to host their home games at Osaka Dome (in the distant past, the Tigers used to make a road trip every year during this period to allow the tournament to take place). This period was also called 死のロード (shi no ro-do, lit. "the Road Trip of Death") due the difficulties the team had to endure.

In addition, teams are able to practice during the tournament at public and private facilities made available in Nishinomiya, and neighboring Osaka, Amagasaki, and Kobe.

Usually, first-year students are not selected to take part in Spring Kōshien, so in their three years of high school, players have five chances to go to Kōshien.

== Notable events and accomplishments ==
=== Spring-Summer champions ===
Known in Japanese as 春夏連続優勝 (haru-natsu renzoku yuusho) or Spring-Summer champions, this signifies the winning of both the senbatsu (Spring) and senshuken (Summer) tournaments in a calendar year. To date, this has been accomplished eight times:

Spring-Summer champions
Year	School	Spring	Opponent	Result	Summer	Opponent	Result	Notes
1962	Sakushin Gakuin (Tochigi)	34th	Nichidai-san (Tōkyō)	1 - 0	44th	Kurume Commercial (Fukuoka)	1 - 0	
1966	Chūkyō Commercial (Aichi)	38th	Tosa (Kochi)	1 - 0	48th	Matsuyama Commercial (Ehime)	3 - 1	Now known as Chūkyōdai Chūkyō
1979	Minoshima (Wakayama)	51st	Namishō (Osaka)	8 - 7	61st	Ikeda (Tokushima)	4 - 3	Namishō is now known as Daitaidai Namishō
1987	PL Gakuen (Ōsaka)	59th	Kantō Ichi (Tōkyō)	7 - 1	69th	Jōsō Gakuin (Ibaraki)	5 - 2	
1998	Yokohama (Kanagawa)	70th	Kandai Ichi (Ōsaka)	3 - 0	80th	Kyōto Seishō (Kyōto)	3 - 0	Daisuke Matsuzaka capped the feat with a no-hitter in the final against Kyōto Seishō
2010	Kōnan (Okinawa)	82nd	Nichidai-san (Tōkyō)	10 - 5 (12)	92nd	Tōkaidai Sagami (Kanagawa)	13 - 1	
2012	Osaka Tōin (Osaka)	84th	Kōsei Gakuin (Aomori)	7 - 3	94th	Kōsei Gakuin (Aomori)	3 - 0	The first time the same two teams met in both the Spring and Summer finals. Kōsei Gakuin became the third team to reach three consecutive finals (and the only one to lose all three)
2018	Osaka Tōin (Osaka)	90th	Chiben Wakayama (Wakayama)	5 - 2	100th	Kanaashi Nogyo (Akita)	13 - 2	The first time a previous Spring-Summer champion achieved the feat again

=== Participation of overseas teams ===
Before World War II, teams from Taiwan, Korea, and Manchuria, which were all part of the Empire of Japan at the time, participated in the tournaments (in the spring only Taiwan took part). The first overseas teams to participate were Pusan Commercial School of Korea and Dalian Commercial School of Manchuria in the 1921 Summer Kōshien. Foreign teams have made it as far as the championship game, but have never won the tournament. The last tournament including foreign teams was the 1940 Spring Kōshien.

Foreign teams advancing to the championship game
Year	Tournament	School	Result		Opponent
1926	12th Summer	Dalian Commercial (Manchuria)	Runner-up	2–1	Shizuoka High (Shizuoka)
1931	17th Summer	Chiayi Agricultural (Taiwan)	Runner-up	4–0	Chūkyō Commercial (Aichi)

=== Six-time Kōshien participants ===
Currently, the maximum number of times a player can appear in Kōshien is five. However, under the former secondary school system, a player could appear more than five times. Here are two examples.

Year	Tournament	Tamotsu Kusumoto; Akashi Secondary (Hyōgo)	Masao Yoshida; Chūkyō Commercial (Aichi)
1930	7th Spring	2nd year	
1931	8th Spring	3rd year	
1932	9th Spring	4th year	3rd year
1932	18th Summer	4th year	3rd year
1933	10th Spring	5th year	4th year
1933	19th Summer	5th year	4th year
1934	11th Spring		5th year
1934	20th Summer		5th year
Total appearances		6	6

=== Makeshift Kōshien ===
The tournament was suspended due to the war from summer 1941 until spring 1946, with the exception of a "Promote the Fighting Spirit" tournament held by the Ministry of Education in 1942 at Kōshien. The number of teams was only 16 compared with 23 at the previous tournament, but each region held qualifying tournaments and sent teams to the national tournament. The military theme was prevalent at the tournament, with military slogans posted on the scoreboard, and traditional Japanese kanji characters replacing trendy English letters on the players' uniforms. The tournament proceeded smoothly and Tokushima Commercial (Tokushima) won the championship. However, since this tournament differed from past Summer Kōshiens hosted by Asahi Shimbun, it is not counted as an official Kōshien tournament.

=== Sacred "Dirt of Kōshien" ===
In the 1937 Summer Kōshien, Kumamoto Tech (Kumamoto) advanced to the championship game, but lost. After the game, Kumamoto Tech player Tetsuharu Kawakami grabbed a handful of dirt from the playing field of Kōshien Stadium and put it in his uniform pocket as a memento. Some years later, in the 1949 Summer Kōshien, after Kokura High (Fukuoka) lost to Kurashiki Tech (Okayama) in the semifinals, Kokura pitcher Kunio Fukushima scooped up some Kōshien dirt and took it home. This has become known as the original scooping of "the dirt of Kōshien" (甲子園の土, Kōshien no tsuchi). Since then, as a memento of their fleeting time on the hallowed grounds of Kōshien, players from the losing teams take home a pouch of the precious soil.

At the 1958 Summer Kōshien, Shuri High (Okinawa) became the first school to represent Okinawa (then under U.S. government rule) in a Kōshien tournament. They were eliminated in their first game by Tsuruga High (Fukui). After the game, they collected souvenirs of dirt and took them home. However, due to health regulations of the Ryūkyū government they were not allowed to keep the dirt, and it was confiscated. Some Japan Airlines flight attendants heard about this, and had a sea stone lying outside Kōshien Stadium sent to Shuri. Even today this "Monument of Friendship" lies in the yard of the school as a reminder of the first trip to Kōshien by a team from Okinawa.

=== Disqualifications ===
In the past, if a scandal was uncovered at a high school chosen to participate in the Kōshien, the school was forced to withdraw from competition in the tournament. A team's participation in the tournament was affected even by scandals not related to team members. However, recently, such unrelated incidents have had less effect on a team's participation.

Disqualifications from Kōshien based on circumstances other than scandals have also occurred. In the 1922 summer tournament, Niigata Commercial High School's disqualification was based on a star player's illness.

Disqualifications from Spring and Summer Kōshien Tournaments
Year	Tournament	School	Reason for Disqualification
1922	8th Summer	Niigata Commercial (Niigata)	Star player's illness
1935	12th Spring	Naniwa Commercial (Ōsaka)	Series of crimes connected with the school
1939	25th Summer	Teikyō (Tokyo)	Concerns regarding player qualifications
1939	25th Summer	Nichidai San (Tōkyō)	Concerns regarding player qualifications
1952	24th Spring	Moji East (Fukuoka)	Player exempted from school examinations
1958	30th Spring	Naniwa Commercial (Ōsaka)	Student blackmail
1965	37th Spring	Kōchi Commercial (Kōchi)	Assault involving player
1967	39th Spring	Tsuyama Commercial (Okayama)	Assault involving former player
1971	43rd Spring	Hokkai (Hokkaidō)	Assault involving students
1971	43rd Spring	Sanda Gakuen (Hyōgo)	Assault involving students
1971	43rd Spring	Shiwakayama Commercial (Wakayama)	Assault involving students
1971	43rd Spring	Nanbu (Wakayama)	Assault involving students
1975	45th Spring	Moji Industrial (Fukuoka)	Attempted assault involving students
1984	56th Spring	Ikeda (Tokushima)	Player DWI. (Note: Japanese law states the minimum age for both alcohol and tobacco is 20 years. See Smoking in Japan.)
1984	56th Spring	Hakodatedai Yūto (Hokkaidō)	Manager involved in hit and run accident
1985	57th Spring	Meitoku Gijuku (Kōchi)	Team president involved in criminal case
1987	59th Spring	Tōkaidai Urayasu (Chiba)	Assault involving player
1989	61st Spring	Iwakura (Tōkyō)	Assault involving team leader
1992	64th Spring	Uenomiya (Ōsaka)	Assault of a student by former coach
1992	64th Spring	Kōbe Kōryō (Hyōgo)	Use of tobacco by player
2000	72nd Spring	Tsuruga Kehi (Fukui)	Player DWI
2005	87th Summer	Meitoku Gijuku (Kōchi)	Use of tobacco by player also involved in assault
2006	78th Spring	Komadai Tomakomai (Hokkaidō)	Use of tobacco and alcohol by former player.

== Terminology for champions from different regions ==
=== Shirakawa Barrier and the Tsugaru Strait ===
For the first eight-plus decades of the Kōshien tournament, no team north of the Kantō region won a championship. This phenomenon became known in the high school baseball world as the Shirakawa Barrier after the actual fortification by that name, which was built near the border between the Kantō and Tōhoku regions in Shirakawa, Fukushima during the Nara Period (710–794).

At the 2004 Summer Kōshien, South Hokkaidō representative Komazawa University Tomakomai High (Komadai Tomakomai) took the title, and in one bound leaped over not only the Shirakawa Barrier but also the Tsugaru Strait separating Hokkaidō from Honshū. On the plane carrying the team and championship flag back home, at the moment the plane crossed the Tsugaru Strait, the passengers joined in unison for a celebration cheer.

Despite Komadai Tomakomai becoming the northernmost team to win a Kōshien championship, the championship flag did not actually pass through the Shirakawa Barrier on land, leading many fans (especially in the Tōhoku region) to consider the barrier unbroken. It was finally broken in 2022, when Sendai Ikuei (Miyagi) beat Shimonoseki Kokusai (Yamaguchi) to become the first Tōhoku school to win a Kōshien championship.

In 2005, Komadai Tomakomai won a second straight Summer Kōshien title, becoming the first to do so since Kokura Secondary (Fukuoka) in 1947–48. This title was tainted after the tournament, however, by reports of repeated incidents of physical punishment of one of the players, including once during the tournament, by the baseball club advisor (a 27-year-old school faculty member). Besides a reprimand for withholding the report until after the tournament, the High School Baseball Federation did not punish Komazawa Tomakomai. However, the report drew widespread attention to the issue of physical punishment in youth sports in Japan. It is believed that such physical punishment probably goes heavily underreported, due to cultural tendencies.

Hokkaidō and Tōhoku teams in the championship game (through 2022)
Year	Tournament	School	Result		Opponent
1915	1st Summer	Akita Secondary (Akita)	Runner-up	2–1	Kyōto Ni Secondary (Kyōto)
1963	35th Spring	Hokkai (Hokkaidō)	Runner-up	10–0	Shimonoseki Commercial (Yamaguchi)
1969	51st Summer	Misawa (Aomori)	Runner-up	4–2	Matsuyama Commercial (Ehime)
1971	53rd Summer	Iwaki (Fukushima)	Runner-up	1–0	Tōin Gakuen (Kanagawa)
1989	71st Summer	Sendai Ikuei (Miyagi)	Runner-up	2–0	Teikyō (East Tōkyō)
2001	73rd Spring	Sendai Ikuei (Miyagi)	Runner-up	7–6	Jōsō Gakuin (Ibaraki)
2003	85th Summer	Tōhoku (Miyagi)	Runner-up	4–2	Jōsō Gakuin (Ibaraki)
2004	86th Summer	Komadai Tomakomai (South Hokkaidō)	Champion	13–10	Saibi (Ehime)
2005	87th Summer	Komadai Tomakomai (South Hokkaidō)	Champion	5–3	Kyōto Gaidai Nishi (Kyōto)
2006	88th Summer	Komadai Tomakomai (South Hokkaidō)	Runner-up	4–3	Waseda Jitsugyo (West Tōkyō)
2009	81st Spring	Hanamaki Highashi (Iwate)	Runner-up	1–0	Seihō (Nagasaki)
2011	93rd Summer	Kōsei Gakuin (Aomori)	Runner-up	11–0	Nichidai-san (West Tōkyō)
2012	84th Spring	Kōsei Gakuin (Aomori)	Runner-up	7–3	Ōsaka Tōin (Ōsaka)
2012	94th Summer	Kōsei Gakuin (Aomori)	Runner-up	3–0	Ōsaka Tōin (Ōsaka)
2015	87th Spring	Tōkai Daiyon (Hokkaidō)	Runner-up	3–1	Tsuruga Kehi (Fukui)
2015	97th Summer	Sendai Ikuei (Miyagi)	Runner-up	10–6	Tōkaidai Sagami (Kanagawa)
2016	98th Summer	Hokkai (South Hokkaidō)	Runner-up	7–1	Sakushin Gakuin (Tochigi)
2018	100th Summer	Kanaashi Nōgyō (Akita)	Runner-up	13–2	Ōsaka Tōin (Ōsaka)
2022	104th Summer	Sendai Ikuei (Miyagi)	Champion	8–1	Shimonoseki Kokusai (Yamaguchi)

=== Passing Hakone and Fording the Tone River ===
In the early days of the Kōshien tournament, western Japanese teams won the majority of the tournaments and were thus seen as stronger than eastern teams. The metaphorical barrier keeping the championship flags in western Japan was Hakone, which, like Shirakawa, was a strategic checkpoint during the Edo period (1603–1868) requiring official passes to pass through.

Technically, the first "passing of Hakone" occurred when Keio Futsūbu (Tōkyō) won in the summer of 1916, the second Summer Kōshien. However, the tournament and high school baseball itself were far from the eventual heights of their popularity at the time, and 33 years passed before a Kantō team won another championship; that victory by Shōnan High (Kanagawa) in the summer of 1949 is regarded as the first passing of Hakone.

The first passing of Hakone in the spring was achieved in 1957 by Waseda Jitsugyō (Tōkyō), which was led by pitcher and future pro baseball legend Sadaharu Oh.

The championship flags made their way farther north into Kantō in 1962, when Sakushin Gakuin (Tochigi) became the first school to win both the Spring and Summer tournaments in one calendar year. To reach Tochigi, the flag had to "ford the Tone River," a major waterway that roughly divides the region into northern and southern halves.

Since then, Kantō teams have won championships more frequently, and as a result, these terms have fallen out of use.

=== Crossing the Kanmon Straits ===
Refers to a championship by a team from Kyūshū. The first team to "cross the Kanmon Straits" between Honshū and Kyūshū was Kokura Secondary in the 1947 Summer Kōshien. Coincidentally, Kokura Secondary repeated as champions in 1948, a feat not matched until Komadai Tomakomai did it in 2004 and 2005, also becoming the first team to bring the title to their region.

Kyūshū teams in the championship game (through 1947)
Year	Tournament	School	Result		Opponent
1934	20th Summer	Kumamoto Tech (Kumamoto)	Runner-up	2–0	Gokō Secondary (Hiroshima)
1937	23rd Summer	Kumamoto Tech (Kumamoto)	Runner-up	3–1	Chūkyō Commercial (Aichi)
1947	19th Spring	Kokura Secondary (Fukuoka)	Runner-up	3–1	Tokushima Commercial (Tokushima)
1947	29th Summer	Kokura Secondary (Fukuoka)	Champion	6–3	Gifu Commercial (Gifu)

=== Passing Mount Aso ===
When a team from the southern half of Kyūshū wins a tournament, the championship flag must pass Mount Aso in Kumamoto. The first team to "pass Mount Aso" was Seiseikō High (Kumamoto) in the 1958 Spring Kōshien. This has not yet been achieved in the Summer Kōshien.

=== Crossing the ocean ===
When a team from Okinawa wins a tournament. The first to "cross the ocean" was Okinawa Shōgaku (Okinawa) in the spring of 1999. The first summer crossing occurred when Kōnan (Okinawa) won the 2010 Summer Kōshien.

Okinawa teams in the championship game (through 2010)
Year	Tournament	School	Result		Opponent
1990	72nd Summer	Okinawa Fishery (Okinawa)	Runner-up	1–0	Tenri (Nara)
1991	73rd Summer	Okinawa Fishery (Okinawa)	Runner-up	13–8	Osaka Tōin (Osaka)
1999	71st Spring	Okinawa Shōgaku (Okinawa)	Champion	7–2	Mito Commercial (Ibaraki)
2008	80th Spring	Okinawa Shōgaku (Okinawa)	Champion	9-0	Seibo Gakuen (Saitama)
2010	82nd Spring	Kōnan (Okinawa)	Champion	10–5	Nichidai San (Tokyo)
2010	92nd Summer	Kōnan (Okinawa)	Champion	13–1	Tokai Daigaku Fuzoku Sagami (Kanagawa)
2025	107th Summer	Okinawa Shōgaku (Okinawa)	Champion	3-1	Nichidai San (Tokyo)

=== Into snow country ===
When a team from the Hokuriku region wins a tournament. To date, no team has achieved this. Fukui Commercial High (Fukui) in the 1978 Spring Kōshien and Seiryō (Ishikawa, alma mater of Hideki Matsui) in the 1997 Summer Kōshien reached the semifinals. More recently, Nihon Bunri (Niigata, Niigata) reached the finals in 2009, and made an amazing comeback—down to their final strike with nobody on base in a 10–4 ballgame, they mounted a five-run rally and put the winning run on first base before finally succumbing, 10–9. Seiryō reached the finals in 2019, ultimately losing 5–3 to Riseisha (Osaka).

== Appearances in popular culture ==
Some of the most famous appearances of high school baseball in popular culture are in the manga and anime series Touch, H2 and Cross Game by Mitsuru Adachi, Ace of Diamond by Yuji Terajima, and Major by Takuya Mitsuda. Those series follow the struggles of different high school teams' bids to make it to the Kōshien tournament.

An unusual appearance is in the series Princess Nine, where a private girls' high school forms a baseball team and struggles against systemic bias in the Japan High School Baseball Federation and within their own school in order to make a serious bid at making it to and winning at Kōshien. More recently, the Manga work "Karin´s Mound" (花鈴のマウンド Karin no maundo) also entertained the idea that the Girl's National High School Championship would be also played at Kōshien Stadium, which has happened in the real world since 2021. In the long running baseball video game series Pawapuro Series, it is known that at least three female players (two pitchers and one catcher, until 14) made their name in Kōshien in the main series' original story line (Success Mode) and turned active players in the NPB, through one of them retired later and become a coach and lecturer in Baseball academy.

The manga and anime Big Windup! by Asa Higuchi is about high school baseball. It follows the story of a first-year pitcher and his team's struggles to get to Kōshien. It won the Kodansha Manga Award in 2007.

In the finale of the anime Zipang, radio broadcast of the "patriotic" 1942 summer tournament is playing in the background when Kadomatsu meets his grandfather back in the past.

In the Jujutsu Kaisen supernatural action manga, after an exchange event between two jujutsu schools is interrupted by enemies, a decision is made to finish it with an impromptu friendly baseball tournament, which takes place in a chapter titled "Jujutsu Koshien". This title was also preserved for the associated episode of the anime adaptation.

== See also ==
- Hanshin Kōshien Stadium
- High school baseball in South Korea
- Japanese High School Baseball Invitational Tournament
- Japanese High School Baseball Championship
- Kokoyakyu: High School Baseball—documentary film
- Ōendan
