= Japanese High School Baseball Championship =

Japanese Spring High School Baseball Tournament

Coordinates: 34°43′17″N 135°21′42″E

The National High School Baseball Championship
- The official logo of The Competition
- Sport: Baseball
- Founded: 1915; 111 years ago
- No. of teams: 49 (56 in special editions)
- Country: Japan
- Venue: Hanshin Koshien Stadium
- Most recent champion: Chiben Gakuen, Wakayama (108th - 2026)
- Most titles: Chukyōdai Chukyō (7 titles)
- Broadcasters: NHK, ABC
- Streaming partners: SPORTS BULL; Yahoo JP; Abema
- Related competitions: The National High School Baseball Invitational Tournament
- Website: https://vk.sportsbull.jp/koshien/ https://baseball.yahoo.co.jp/hsb_vk/

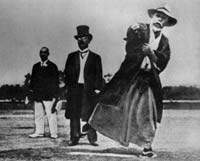
1st National High School Baseball Championship Ceremonial First Pitch, August 18, 1915

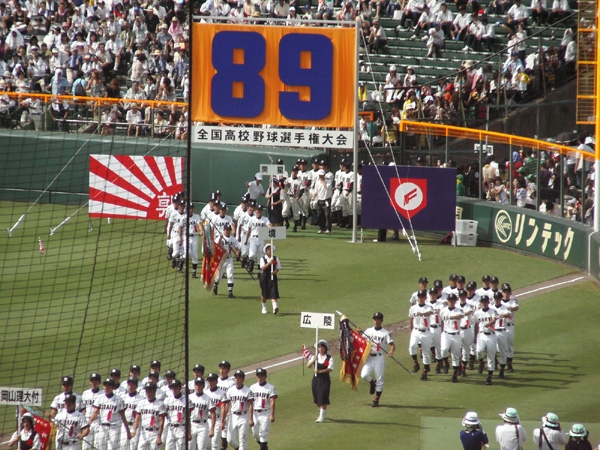
The opening ceremony of 89th National High School Baseball Championship, 2006

The National High School Baseball Championship (全国高等学校野球選手権大会, Zenkoku Kōtō Gakkō Yakyū Senshuken Taikai) of Japan, commonly known as "Summer Koshien" (夏の甲子園, Natsu no Kōshien), is an annual nationwide high school baseball tournament. It is the largest scale amateur sport event in Japan.

The tournament, organized by the Japan High School Baseball Federation and Asahi Shimbun, takes place during the summer school vacation period, culminating in a two-week final tournament stage with 49 teams in August at Hanshin Koshien Stadium (阪神甲子園球場, Hanshin Kōshien Kyūjō) in the Koshien district of Nishinomiya City, Hyōgo, Japan.

== Background ==
The 49 schools taking part in the final tournament represent regional champions of each of the prefectures of Japan (with two each from Hokkaidō and Tokyo). Prior to 1940, teams from Korea, Manchuria and Taiwan also participated during their time as Japanese colonies. From mid-June until July, regional tournaments are held to decide who is sent to Koshien.

The rules are the same as in the National High School Baseball Invitational Tournament. It is a single elimination tournament with nine inning games. Until 2021, games were declared official after seven complete innings in the case of suspension (due to weather, et cetera), except for the championship game which must be played to completion. Starting in 2022, games must last nine innings unless the run rule is in effect. If a game is suspended for inclement weather, the game will resume at point of interruption and will play the full length of game. For the regional tournaments, games are ended if one team leads by at least ten runs after five innings or seven runs after seven innings, except in the championship games. Designated hitters are not used. Four umpires are used, except for night games in which two outfield line umpires are added.

The first round pairings and byes are decided by lottery. 34 teams meet in the first round, and 15 teams with byes join at the second round (32 teams play in the second round). Therefore, it takes either five or six wins for a team to win the championship. Until 2002, the four quarter finals were played in one day, but this was changed to two a day over two days to give the players time off. If rain outs continue for more than three days, four games are played in one day. This occurred in 2003, so the first time the quarter finals were played over two days was actually 2004. To accommodate the extra day, the long tradition of starting the tournament on August 8 was changed to start a day or two early.

Up to four games are played each day until the quarter finals. The starting times of each day's games is shown below. Following games are begun about 30 minutes after the previous game ends. Due to the fast pace of the pitching, four games in one day are usually completed before sunset.

Day of the tournament	1	2	3	4	5	6	7	8	9	10	11	A	12
Round	1st	1st	1st	1st	1st/2nd	2nd	2nd	2nd	2nd	3rd	3rd	Rest	Quarter
Games Start time Rest Days	3 10:20	4 8:00	4 8:00	4 8:00	3 9:00	4 8:00	4 8:00	4 8:00	3 9:00	4 8:00	4 8:00	1st Rest Day	4 8:00
Day of the tournament	B	13	C	14									
Round	Rest	Semis	Rest	Final									
Games Start time Rest Days	2nd Rest Day	2 9:00	3rd Rest Day	1 10:00									

== Extra innings ==
For tournaments previous to 1958 there were no extra inning limits for a game tied after nine innings of play. In 1933, Masao Yoshida had pitched a complete game during a 25 inning shutout in the semifinal, an all-time record. Yoshida had thrown 336 pitches during that game.

In 1958, games were limited to 18 innings, with a full replay required after that on a future day. The first pitcher to pitch a complete game 18 innings was Eiji Bando in a 1958 quarterfinal game. Daisuke Matsuzaka became the last pitcher to pitch a complete game over 15 innings (17 innings in 250 pitches, 1998). Pitchers are currently limited to 15 innings.

From 2000 to 2017, games were capped at 15 innings with a full replay required on a future day. In 2006, the replay rule was implemented after a 15 inning tie in the final.

In 2018, the Japan High School Baseball Federation capped regular play to 12 innings (except in the championship final), but games will continue with the World Baseball Softball Confederation baseball tiebreaker with runners on first and second base (the previous two players relative to the current player in the batting order) starting with in the 13th inning.

Starting in 2023, the tiebreaker rules begin in the tenth inning.

In addition, if the game is suspended because of inclement weather or curfew in extra innings, the game is declared a tie and a replay will be implemented at the earliest possible date.

== Traditions ==
The tournament theme song is "The Laurels of Victory Shine on You" (Japanese: 栄冠(えいかん)は君(きみ)に輝(かがや)く, Hepburn: eikan wa kimi ni kagayaku).

Usually air sirens are used to signal the start and the end of the games, the earlier registers of this tradition are from 1936. Its origins are unknown, but considering the time of its origin, before the advent of mass communication, it is considered that its use was the same as it is nowadays: to signal the start and the finish of a match for spectators and stadium workforce.

Every five years, the tournament celebrates the anniversary of the founding of the tournament, and a deep crimson is used for the championship flag for commemorative purposes. Also, on those editions, the number of participants on the final part of the tournament also grows, an exception was made in 2024 (106th) in order to celebrate the 100th anniversary of the building and the tournament move to Koshien Stadium.

For third year students, a loss at the tournament signifies an end to their high school baseball career, as there are no other major tournaments for the rest of their academic career. It is common for players to cry in sorrow after tight games and/or their losses.

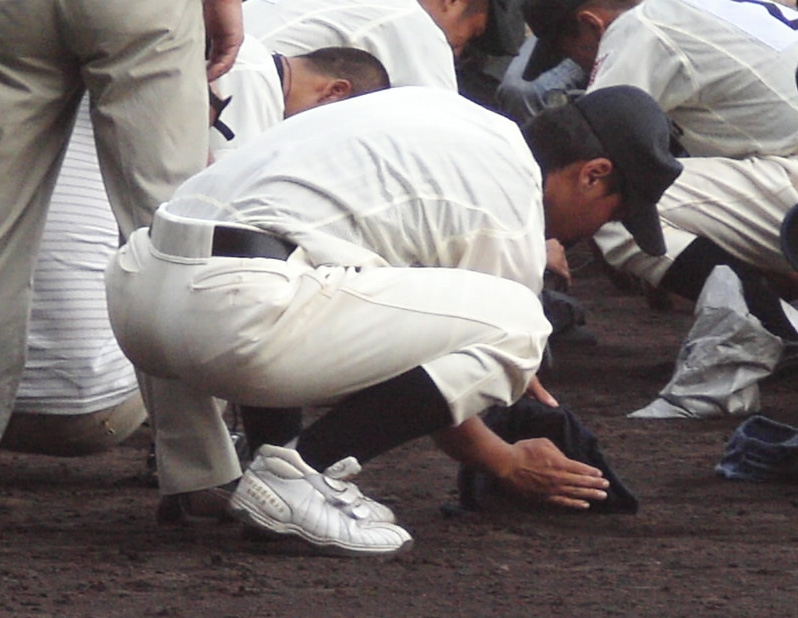
Players collecting Koshien infield dirt during the 87th Tournament (2007)

Another common tradition after games is the act of collecting soil from the Koshien Stadium infield as a souvenir. The dirt collected by the chosen players is shared among the baseball club members of their schools. The dirt is kept as memorabilia for the third year players and shared between first and second years as a way to motivate them to reach the Koshien spot once again, but sometimes, first and second years refuse to receive the soil as a way to motivate them to return to Koshien.

Some teams also decide take part of the soil and throw the soil into the infield of their training practice as a way to bring good luck for them into the next year's tournament.

An interesting exception to this tradition happened in 1958. At the time, Okinawa was under U.S. rule. In that year, Okinawa's Shuri baseball team participated for the first time in both spring and summer. After losing to Tsuruga (from Fukui) in the first round of the summer tournament, they decided to pick up the infield soil after the game. However, they were not allowed to bring the dirt back to Okinawa, having to discard it at the port as the soil was considered "foreign soil". Volunteer flight attendants from Japan Airlines learned of the story and decided to pick up stones from the coast of Nishinomiya and donate them to Shuri. The stones are still displayed in the school yard as a monument called Monument of Friendship (友愛の碑, Yūai no ishibumi), celebrating the team's first appearance at the Koshien.

Akin to North American high school football and North American college sports, the use of brass bands playing cheer songs is very common, alongside Oendan cheer squads, both are considered part of the tournament spectacle.

== Finals ==
(R)	Replay
*	Match went to Extra innings

=== List of champions ===
List of champions
Number	Year	Champion	Runner-up	Final score	Notes
1	1915	Kyoto Dai-ni Chugaku	Akita Chugaku	2–1	
2	1916	Keio University High School	Ichioka Central	6–2	
3	1917	Aichi Dai-Ichi Chugaku	Kwansei Gakuin Chugaku	0–1	
	(R)	Aichi Dai-Ichi Central	Kansai Gakuin Central	1–0	The first game was rained out after 3 innings
	1918				The tournament was cancelled due to the Rice riots of 1918
4	1919	Kobe Dai-Ichi Chugaku	Nagano Shihan	7–4	
5	1920	Kansai Gakuin Central	Keio Futsubu	17–0	
6	1921	Wakayama Central	Kyoto Dai-Ichi	16–4	
7	1922	Wakayama Central (2)	Kobe	8–4	
8	1923	Kouyou Chugaku	Wakayama Central	5–2	
9	1924	Hiroshima	Matsumoto	3–0	
10	1925	Takamatsu	Waseda Jitsugyō	5–3	
11	1926	Shizuoka Central	Tairen	2–1	Tairen was the only team from Manchuria to make it to the finals when they participated in the tournament from 1923 to 1940
12	1927	Takamatsu (2)	Kouryo Central	5–1	
13	1928	Matsumoto	Heian	3–1	
14	1929	Hiroshima (2)	Kaisou Central	3–0	
15	1930	Hiroshima (3)	Suwa Sanshi	8–2	
16	1931	Chukyōdai Chukyō	Kagi Nōrin (Agriculture) High School	4–1	Kagi Nōrin was the only team from Taiwan to make it to the finals when they participated in the tournament from 1923 to 1940
17	1932	Chukyōdai Chukyō (2)	Matsuyama	4–3	
18	1933	Chukyōdai Chukyō (3)	Heian	2–1	
19	1934	Gokou Central	Kumamoto Kougyou	2–0	
20	1935	Matsuyama	Ikuei	6–1	
21	1936	Gifu	Heian	9–1	
22	1937	Chukyōdai Chukyō (4)	Kumamoto Kougyou	3–1	
23	1938	Heian	Gifu	2–1	
24	1939	Kaisou Central	Shimonoseki	5–0	Seiichi Shima threw the first no-hitter in the finals
25	1940	Kaisou Central (2)	Shimada	2–1	
	1942–45				From 1942 to 1945 the tournament was not held due to World War II
26	1946	Naniwa	Kyoto Dai-ni Central	2–0	
27	1947	Kokura Central	Gifu	6–3	
28	1948	Kokura	Touin	1–0	
29	1949	Shounan	Gifu	5–3	
30	1950	Matsuyama Higashi	Naruto	12–8	
31	1951	Heian	Kumagai	7–4	
32	1952	Ashiya	Yatsuo	4–1	
33	1953	Matsuyama	Tosa	3–2	
34	1954	Chukyōdai Chukyō (5)	Shizuoka	3–0	
35	1955	Yokkaichi	Sakaide	4–1	
36	1956	Heian	Gifu	3–2	
37	1957	Hiroshima	Hosei Dai-ni	3–1	
38	1958	Yanai	Tokushima	7–0	
39	1959	Saijo	Utsunomiya Kougyou	8–2	
40	1960	Hosei Dai-ni	Shizuoka	3–0	
41	1961	Nami	Touin	1–0	
42	1962	Sakushin Gakuin	Kurume	1–0	
43	1963	Myojo	Shimonoseki	2–1	
44	1964	Kochi	Hayatomo	2–0	
45	1965	Miike Kougyou	Choshi	2–0	
46	1966	Chukyōdai Chukyō (6)	Matsuyama	3–1	
47	1967	Narashino	Kouryo	7–1	
48	1968	Kokoku	Shizuoka	1–0	
49	1969*	Matsuyama (2)	Misawa	0–0 (18); 4-2	First Game capped at 18 inning limit. Second game was played because of tie. Koji Ohta pitched all 18 innings in the first game, and appeared in the second game.
50	1970	Tōkaidai Sagami	PL Gakuen	10–6	
51	1971	Tōin Gakuen	Iwaki	1–0	
52	1972	Tsukumi	Yanai	3–1	
53	1973	Hiroshima	Shizuoka	3–2	
54	1974	Choshi Shōgyō	Hofu	7–0	
55	1975	Narashino	Niihama	5–4	
56	1976	Obirin	PL Gakuen	4–3	
57	1977	Toyodai Himeji	Higashikuni	4–1	The game was won with a three-run walk-off home run in the bottom of the tenth inning
58	1978	PL Gakuen	Kōchi Shōgyō	3–2	
59	1979	Minoshima	Ikeda	4–3	
60	1980	Yokohama	Waseda Jitsugyō	6–4	
61	1981	Hōtoku Gakuen	Kyōto Shōgyō	2–0	
62	1982	Ikeda	Hiroshima Shōgyō	12–2	
63	1983	PL Gakuen (2)	Yokohama Shōgyō	3–0	
64	1984	Toride Dai-ni	PL Gakuen	8–4	
65	1985	PL Gakuen	Ube Shōgyō	4–3	PL Gakuen, led by "K-K Combi" (Masumi Kuwata and Kazuhiro Kiyohara), has returned to the championship.
66	1986	Tenri	Matsuyama Shōgyō	3–2	
67	1987	PL Gakuen (3)	Jōsō Gakuin	5–2	
68	1988	Hiroshima Shōgyō	Fukuoka Dai-ichi	1–0	
69	1989	Teikyō	Sendai Ikuei	2–0	
70	1990	Tenri	Okinawa Suisan	8–4	
71	1991	Osaka Tōin	Okinawa Suisan	13–8	Ichiro Suzuki's Aikodai Meiden lost in the first round.
72	1992	Nishi Nihon Tandai Fuzoku	Takudai Kōryō	1–0	Hideki Matsui got five consecutive intentional walks at one game.
73	1993	Ikuei	Kasukabe Kyōei	3–2	
74	1994	Saga Shōgyō	Shōnan	8–4	
75	1995	Teikyō (2)	Seiryō	3–1	
76	1996	Matsuyama Shōgyō	Kumamoto Kōgyō	6–3	
77	1997	Chiben Wakayama	Heian	6–3	
78	1998	Yokohama	Kyōto Seishō	3–0	Daisuke Matsuzaka threw the second no-hitter in the finals.
79	1999	Kiryu Dai-ichi	Okayama Ridai Fuzoku	14–4	
80	2000	Chiben Wakayama	Tōkaidai Urayasu	11–6	
81	2001	Nichidai-san	ōhmi	5–2	
82	2002	Meitoku Gijuku	Chiben Wakayama	7–2	
83	2003	Jōsō Gakuin	Tōhoku	4–2	Yu Darvish's Tōhoku lost the final game
84	2004	Komadai Tomakomai	Saibi	13–10	
85	2005	Komadai Tomakomai (2)	Kyōto Gaidai Nishi	5–3	
86	2006*	Waseda Jitsugyō	Komadai Tomakomai	1–1 (15); 4-3	Waseda Jitsugyo's Yuki Saito threw 6 complete games, 69 innings, and 948 pitches over the 2-week span, including 4 complete games, 43 innings and 553 pitches, in the final 4 days of the tournament. Game went the full 15 innings before being called by rule. Current rules now call for both the pitcher being pulled after 15 innings and the WBSC two-runner tiebreaker starting in the tenth inning.
87	2007	Saga Kita	Kōryō	5–4	Kouryou took a 4–0 lead, led by their ace pitcher, Nomura. In the bottom of the 8th, Nomura gives up a bases loaded walk followed by a grand slam home run by Soejima which lifts Saga Kita to the title.
88	2008	Osaka Tōin (2)	Tokoha Kikugawa	17–0	Okumura hits a grand slam home run to open the first inning as Osaka Tōin's offensive juggernaut overwhelmed Tokoha Kikugawa. Osaka Toin's ace Fukushima Yuuto pitches a complete game 5-hit shutout for the win.
89	2009	Chukyōdai Chukyō (6)	Nihon Bunri	10–9	Chukyo holds a 10–4 lead into the 9th inning. Their ace Doubayashi Shouta goes back on the mound for the final inning. But with two outs Nihon Bunri comes back with a comeback for the ages, forcing Doubayashi off the mound and scoring five runs. The tying runner stood on third base when Wakabayashi lines out to third base to end the game. Nihon Bunri would have been the first team from Niigata to win the title had they completed the comeback.
90	2010	Kōnan	Tōkaidai Sagami	13–1	Shimabukuro Yousuke and Kounan dominate the field, giving the first ever Summer Koshien champion to an Okinawan school.
91	2011	Nichidai-san	Kōsei Gakuin	11–0	Kentaro Yoshinaga throws a 5-hitter, while Shun Takayama hits a 3-run homer in this rout of a match
92	2012	Osaka Tōin (3)	Kōsei Gakuin	3–0	Shintaro Fujinami strikes out 14 batters while conceding only two hits to wrap up the title, as Osaka Tōin becomes the 6th school to win the spring and summer Koshiens in the same year.
93	2013	Maebashi Ikuei	Nobeoka Gakuen	4–3	Kona Takahashi allows his first runs in six games this tournament but still gets the win. Kaito Arai drives in the winning hit in the seventh inning.
94	2014	Osaka Tōin (4)	Mie	4–3	Kosuke Fukushima goes the distance for the win while Makoto Nakamura's 2-run, 2-out single in the bottom of the seventh inning is the winning hit.
95	2015	Tōkaidai Sagami	Sendai Ikuei	10–6	
96	2016	Sakushin Gakuin	Hokkai	7–1	
97	2017	Hanasaki Tokuharu	Kōryō	14–4	
98	2018	Osaka Tōin (5)	Kanaashi Nogyo	13–2	Kanaashi Nogyo was the first time a team from Akita (and the Tohoku region) to reach the finals in a 103 years, the previous time being 1915.
100	2019	Risei-sha	Seiryo	5–3	
	2020	-	-	-	Not held because of COVID-19 pandemic. Instead, each of the 32 spring tournament teams played in a single exhibition game during the time.
103	2021	Chiben Gakuen Wakayama	Chiben Gakuen Nara	9–2	This was the first time in the tournament's history that both finalist teams were from the same academic institution.
104	2022	Sendai Ikuei	Shimonoseki Kokusai	8–1	This was the first time a team from Tohoku region won the tournament.
105	2023	Keio (2)	Sendai Ikuei	8–2	First time in 18 years that a Big 6 affiliated school wins Summer Koshien (2006 with Keio's Main Rival, Waseda). Also, was the first title of the school in 107 years (last being in 1916).
106	2024*	Kyoto International	Kanto Daiichi	2–1 (10)	Tournament was organized as part of the celebrations of the 100th Anniversary of the Hanshin Koshien Stadium. First use of WBSC tiebreaker in the final (now used in the 10th inning), and the first time in 107 years an international school wins the tournament.
107	2025	Okinawa Shogaku	Nichidai-san	3–1	1st Summer title for Okinawa Shogaku 2nd summer title overall for Okinawa
108	2026	Chiben Gakuen Wakayama	Ken-Dai Takasaki	4-3	First tournament featuring video review system

== In popular culture ==
Some of the most famous appearances of the Japanese High School Baseball Championship in popular culture are in the manga and anime series Touch, H2 and Cross Game by Mitsuru Adachi, Ace of Diamond by Yūji Terajima, and Major by Takuya Mitsuda. Those series follow the struggles of different high school teams' bids to make it to the Kōshien tournament.

The Powerful Pro Yakyuu game series consistently uses Koshien in its Success Mode, a story mode with visual novel elements, and in its Eikan Nine mode, which is entirely built around taking a high school team to the tournament.

The 2014 hit Taiwanese film Kano is based on the true story of a high school baseball team from the Kagi Nōrin (Agriculture) High School (now known as National Chiayi University) team in Kagi (now known as Chiayi), Taiwan who qualified for the tournament for the first time in 1931 after never having won a game in its first three seasons. The team was made up of ethnic Japanese, Han Chinese and Taiwanese aborigines. The team won three games to make it to the championship game before losing 4–0 to Chukyō Shōgyō from Nagoya. This was the first of four appearances at the tournament for the Kano team, who later qualified in 1933, 1935 and 1936.

In 2023, TBS made a live action drama based in the book Gekokujō Kyūshi. The book tells about the story of Hakusan High school, a small Mie school that managed to pull a historic upset win in the 2018 Prefectural tournament, taking the school for the first time ever into Summer Koshien.

The Summer Koshien Tournament has historically served as a platform for players who later advance to professional baseball. Names include Ichiro Suzuki, Daisuke Matsuzaka, Yu Darvish, and Shohei Ohtani.

== See also ==
- High school baseball in Japan
- Japan High School Baseball Federation
- Japanese High School Baseball Invitational Tournament ("Spring Koshien")
- Asahi Shimbun
- Hanshin Koshien Stadium
