= Kageura =

Kageura (written: 影浦 or 景浦) is a Japanese surname. Notable people with the surname include:

- Kokoro Kageura (影浦 心, born 1995), Japanese judoka
- Masaru Kageura (景浦 將, 1915–1945), Japanese baseball player
