= Sports Bull =

Japanese Sports-focused Website and APP

SPORTS BULL
- Native name: スポーツブル
- Romanized name: Supōtsuburu
- Available in: Japanese
- Website: https://sportsbull.jp/
- Advertising: Yes
- Commercial: Yes
- Launched: April 4, 2016; 10 years ago

Sports Bull (Japanese: スポーツブル, romanized: Supōtsuburu; abbreviated as SpoBull (スポブル, Spōburu) and stylised in all-capital letters) is a Japanese sports internet media platform provided by Sports Bull Co., Ltd.(スポーツブル株式会社) for various devices, including PCs, smartphones, and tablets.

== Overview ==
The sports internet media platform, operated by Undo-Tsushinsha Co. Ltd. since April 2016, offers free access to over 500 articles daily covering baseball, soccer, and other sports genres.

It offers free live streams of baseball events, including the Koshien Baseball Tournaments. The platform also covers major events such as the FIFA World Cup and World Baseball Classic, as well as original videos and match updates

On October 5, 2016, the service was relaunched under the new name, "Sports Bull", replacing "Undo Tsushin".

On November 10, 2016, Sports Bull announced a partnership with KDDI.

In May 2026, the company that operates the service also replaced "Undo Tsushin" into "Sports Bull".

== Main Content ==
- Spring Koshien, live streaming of all matches (in collaboration with The Mainichi Shimbun and Mainichi Broadcasting System)
- Summer Koshien (in collaboration with The Asahi Shimbun and Asahi Broadcasting Corporation; live streaming of all games (including regional qualification tournaments) and the Meiji Jingu Baseball Tournament)
- Spring high School Volley Championship (in Partnership with FujiTV)
- JFA U-18 Premier League
- All Japan High School Soccer Tournament (on collaboration with NTV)
- BIG6.TV (Tokyo Big6 League)
- Pokari.tv (Inter High School Sports Festival)
- Tohto University Baseball League
