= Daisuke Matsuzaka =

Japanese baseball player (born 1980)

Daisuke Matsuzaka 松坂 大輔
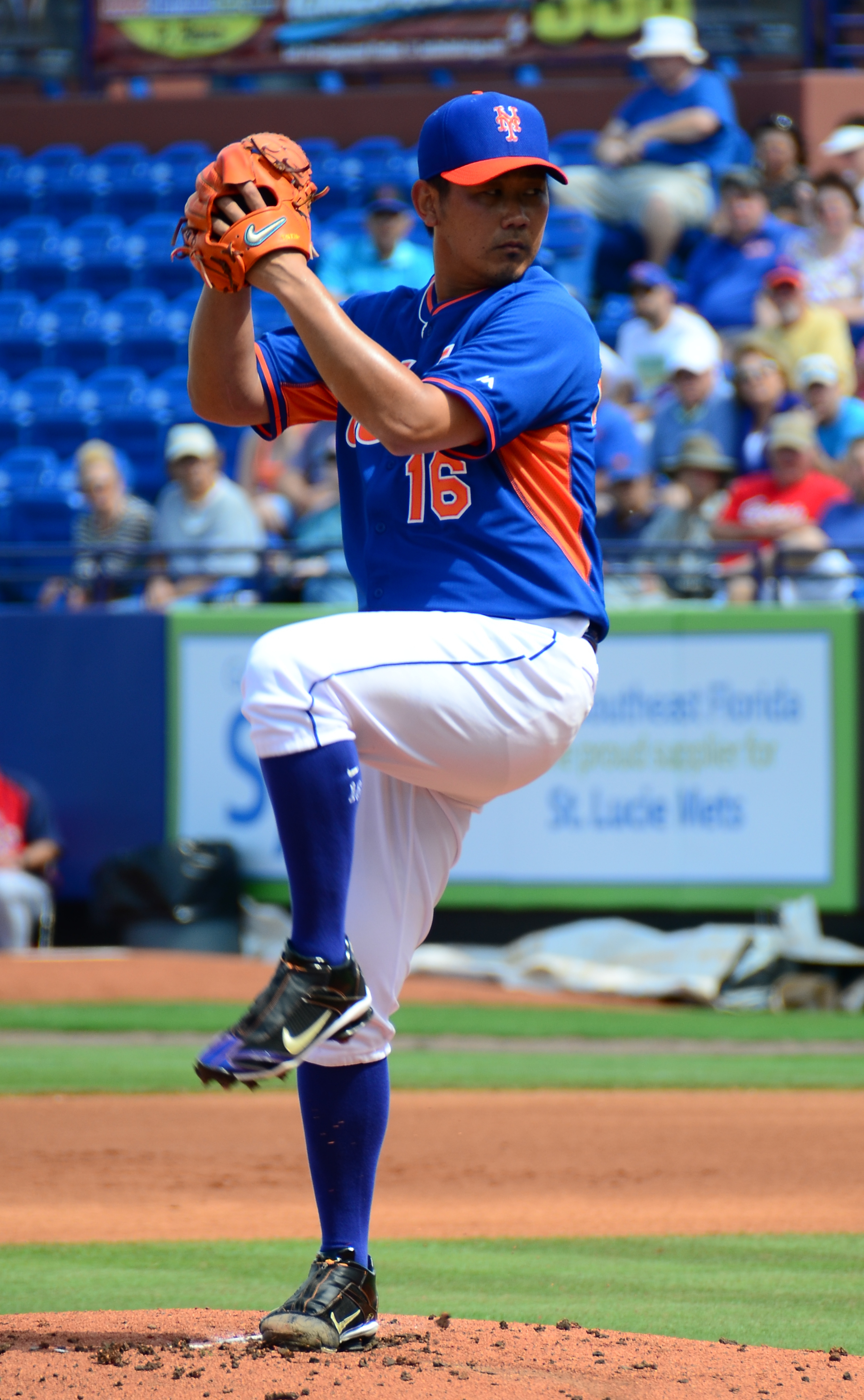
- Matsuzaka with the New York Mets in 2014
- Pitcher
- Born: September 13, 1980 (age 46); Koto Ward, Tokyo, Japan
- Batted: Right Threw: Right

Professional debut
- NPB: April 7, 1999, for the Seibu Lions
- MLB: April 5, 2007, for the Boston Red Sox

Last appearance
- MLB: September 25, 2014, for the New York Mets
- NPB: October 19, 2021, for the Saitama Seibu Lions

NPB statistics
- Win–loss record: 114–65
- Earned run average: 3.04
- Strikeouts: 1,410

MLB statistics
- Win-loss record: 56–43
- Earned run average: 4.45
- Strikeouts: 720
- Stats at Baseball Reference

Teams
- Seibu Lions (1999–2006); Boston Red Sox (2007–2012); New York Mets (2013–2014); Fukuoka SoftBank Hawks (2015–2016); Chunichi Dragons (2018–2019); Saitama Seibu Lions (2021)

Career highlights and awards
- NPB: 7× All-Star (1999–2001, 2004–2006, 2018); 2× Japan Series champion (2004, 2017); Eiji Sawamura Award (2001); Pacific League Rookie of the Year (1999); 7× Mitsui Golden Glove Award (1999–2001, 2003–2006); 3× Best Nine Award (1999–2001); Comeback Player of the Year (2018); 3× NPB wins leader (1999–2001); 2× NPB ERA leader (2003, 2004); 4× NPB strikeout leader (2000, 2001, 2003, 2005); MLB: World Series champion (2007)
Medals
Men's baseball
Representing Japan
World Baseball Classic
Gold medal – first place	2006 San Diego	Team
Gold medal – first place	2009 Los Angeles	Team
Olympic Games
Bronze medal – third place	2004 Athens	Team
Asian Baseball Championship
Silver medal – second place	1999 Seoul	Team
Gold medal – first place	2003 Sapporo	Team

Daisuke Matsuzaka (松坂 大輔, Matsuzaka Daisuke; [matsɯꜜzaka daꜜisɯ̥ke]; born September 13, 1980) is a Japanese former professional baseball pitcher, who pitched professionally for 23 seasons, 16 of them in NPB, 7 in MLB. He is currently a baseball color commentator, critic, reporter, and YouTuber. Daisuke is nicknamed "the Monster of the Heisei Era" (平成の怪物, heisei no kaibutsu) in Japan and "Dice-K" in the United States by The Boston Globe and USA Today. He played for the Boston Red Sox and New York Mets of Major League Baseball (MLB) and the Saitama Seibu Lions, Fukuoka SoftBank Hawks and Chunichi Dragons of Nippon Professional Baseball (NPB).

Internationally, Matsuzaka represented Japan. Matsuzaka was selected the All-World Baseball Classic Team and World Baseball Classic MVP of the inaugural and the second World Baseball Classic, and is an Olympic bronze medalist.

He is the first player to have won both a World Series and a World Baseball Classic, winning the 2006 World Baseball Classic with Team Japan and the 2007 World Series with the Red Sox.

== Early life ==
Matsuzaka was born on September 13, 1980, in Koto Ward, He was named after Japanese high school star pitcher Daisuke Araki. Growing up in Koto, Tokyo, he studied kendo from the age of five to nine and began playing organized baseball when he was in third grade.

== High school career ==
After excelling at the Little League and junior high level, Daisuke Matsuzaka was admitted into Yokohama High School, a baseball powerhouse, in the spring of 1996. By his second of three years, he had developed into the school's ace pitcher. Despite his early success, he would experience a setback that summer when he threw a go-ahead wild pitch in the semi-final game of the Kanagawa Prefecture preliminary round of the National High School Baseball Championship (Summer Koshien).

During that offseason, his fastballs first began to regularly sit around 87 mph (140 km/h). After pitching his school to the championship of the National High School Baseball Invitational Tournament (Spring Koshien), Matsuzaka set his aim on the 1998 Summer Koshien and eventually led his school to the championship.

In the quarterfinal of the 1998 Summer Koshien, Matsuzaka threw 250 pitches in 17 innings in a win over PL Gakuen. (The previous day he had thrown a 148-pitch complete game shutout.) The next day, despite trailing 6–0 in the top of the eighth inning, the team miraculously won the game after scoring 7 runs in the final two innings (four in the eighth and three in the ninth). He started the game in left field, but came in as a reliever in the ninth inning to record the win in 15 pitches. In the final, he threw a no-hitter, the second ever in a final. This performance garnered him the attention of many scouts.

Due to the large number of players from the 1998 Summer Koshien cohort who went on to enjoy success at the professional level, baseball players who were born in the 1980 Japanese academic year (from April 2, 1980, to the following April 1, 1981) have been called the "Matsuzaka Generation" in Japan.

== Professional career ==
=== Saitama Seibu Lions (1999–2006) ===
==== 1998 draft ====
After graduating from high school, he was taken by the Nippon Professional Baseball (NPB) Saitama Seibu Lions with the first pick of the 1998 draft, although both the Colorado Rockies and Arizona Diamondbacks of the North American Major Leagues also recruited him. At first, Matsuzaka stated that he wanted to play for the Yokohama BayStars, and, if he could not, he would then go to work for a company and after which choose the team of his choice through the reverse-draft (gyaku-shimei) system. That changed however, when the manager of the Lions, Osamu Higashio, an accomplished pitcher in his own right, met with Matsuzaka for dinner. At the dinner, Higashio gave Matsuzaka his winning ball for career win number 200. Matsuzaka accepted it and allowed himself to be drafted by the Lions.

Awards in Japan
Awards	1999	2000	2001	2002	2003	2004	2005	2006
Rookie of the Year Award	✓							
Eiji Sawamura Award			✓					
Best Nine Award	✓	✓	✓					
Gold Glove	✓	✓	✓		✓	✓	✓	✓
Led League in Strikeouts		✓	✓		✓		✓	
Led League in Wins	✓	✓	✓					
Led League in ERA					✓ (2.83)	✓ (2.90)		

Matsuzaka won his first official pro game in his first start of the 1999 season against the Nippon Ham Fighters at the Tokyo Dome. His first career strikeout came against Atsushi Kataoka in the first inning on a high fastball clocked at 155 km/h (96 mph). He won the game, but he also gave up the first home run in the game to Michihiro Ogasawara of the Nippon Ham Fighters.

On May 16, 1999, when Matsuzaka was in his rookie season at age 18, he first faced Ichiro Suzuki, a player for the Orix Bluewave at the time, and recorded three strikeouts in three at-bats with a walk. Matsuzaka states that this game was the moment he started to believe that he "belonged" in pro baseball. However, Ichiro would get a bit of revenge on Matsuzaka by hitting his 100th career home run off him in July of that year.

Matsuzaka started in the All-Star game as a rookie in 1999. He struck out Takuro Ishii and Takanori Suzuki of the Bay Stars before number three hitter Yoshinobu Takahashi of the Giants managed to make contact and fly out to left field.

In his first professional season in 1999, Matsuzaka had 16 wins and five losses as the team ace, and was voted Rookie of the Year. Another rookie pitcher in the rival Central League, Koji Uehara, also won the same honor with a 20-win season. Together, they would come to represent their respective leagues as dominant starting pitchers for seasons to come.

In 2000, Matsuzaka had 14 wins and 7 losses. He had 15 wins and 15 losses in his 2001 season and won the Eiji Sawamura Award.

Matsuzaka spent a considerable portion of his 2002 season on the disabled list, which did not count toward his service time. He was not able to regain his pitching form in the 2002 Japan Series, when the Lions faced the Yomiuri Giants. In Game 1 at Tokyo Dome, where the designated hitter rule is not allowed, Matsuzaka batted 7th in the lineup to take advantage of his above-average hitting for a pitcher. However, not only did Matsuzaka not fare well at the plate in this game, but he also helped the Giants to a rout by giving up two key home runs. One was to extremely popular Giants first baseman Kazuhiro Kiyohara, who hit a middle-of-the-plate Matsuzaka fastball off one of the billboards at the back of the left field stands. Matsuzaka would give up another key RBI to Kiyohara in game 4 in relief, as the Lions were meekly swept by the Giants in the series.

In 2003, Matsuzaka logged 16 wins and 7 losses. He easily won the Pacific League ERA title with a 2.83 mark. Matsuzaka used to play for Japan's National Baseball Team, and pitched against South Korea.

He was selected for the NPB All-Star Game in 1999, 2000, 2001, 2004, 2005, 2006. He was voted MVP of the 2004 game.

=== Boston Red Sox (2007–2012) ===
On October 25, 2006, Scott Boras was announced as Matsuzaka's agent to represent him in any contract dealings in the Major Leagues. On November 2, Matsuzaka was officially granted permission by the Lions to pursue a career in Major League Baseball via the posting system.

On November 14, the Boston Red Sox won the bidding rights to Matsuzaka with a bid of $51,111,111.11, outbidding the Texas Rangers, New York Mets, and New York Yankees. The enormous figure — two to three times the Lions' payroll — astounded both Japanese and American baseball executives. The Red Sox had 30 days to sign Matsuzaka to a contract. If a deal could not be reached, Matsuzaka would have returned to the Lions, nullifying the bid. Scott Boras refused to consider the posting fee as part of the contract negotiations, while Red Sox general manager Theo Epstein recalled, "We tried to come up with a total number, for the post and contract, that made sense."

On December 11, Epstein, Red Sox owner John W. Henry and CEO Larry Lucchino boarded a plane to "[take] the fight directly to [Boras]". Nick Cafardo of The Boston Globe asserted that Boras, by refusing to negotiate, was using Matsuzaka as a protest or "test case of the posting system."

On December 13, Matsuzaka and Boras joined Red Sox GM Theo Epstein, CEO Larry Lucchino, and Chairman Tom Werner on a private plane owned by Red Sox owner John Henry headed for Boston. During the flight—which was followed by both the Boston and the Japanese media—the group agreed to terms on a contract. Journalist Nobuhiro Chiba characterized Japanese reaction to the signing: "I think the people are relieved to send Daisuke to the Boston Red Sox." In Boston, Matsuzaka passed his physical and signed a six-year, $52 million contract, which could have been worth as much as $60 million if he fulfilled incentives. The details of the contract included a $2 million signing bonus with a $6 million salary in 2007, $8 million in each of the following three seasons (2008–2010), and $10 million in each of the final two years (2011–2012). He also had a no-trade clause, specially constructed by the Red Sox to fit Matsuzaka's contract.

The final agreement was announced Thursday, December 14 at a 5 p.m. EST news conference at Fenway Park. Afterwards some members of the press noted the confusion created by Matsuzaka's translator at that announcement. Art Martone of the Providence Journal commented, "Matsuzaka's interpreter's command of the English language was shaky, and thus the pitcher's translated comments were brief and, occasionally, unintelligible. About the only clear statement relayed by the interpreter was when Matsuzaka said, 'I'm very happy and excited to be a member of the Boston Red Sox.'"

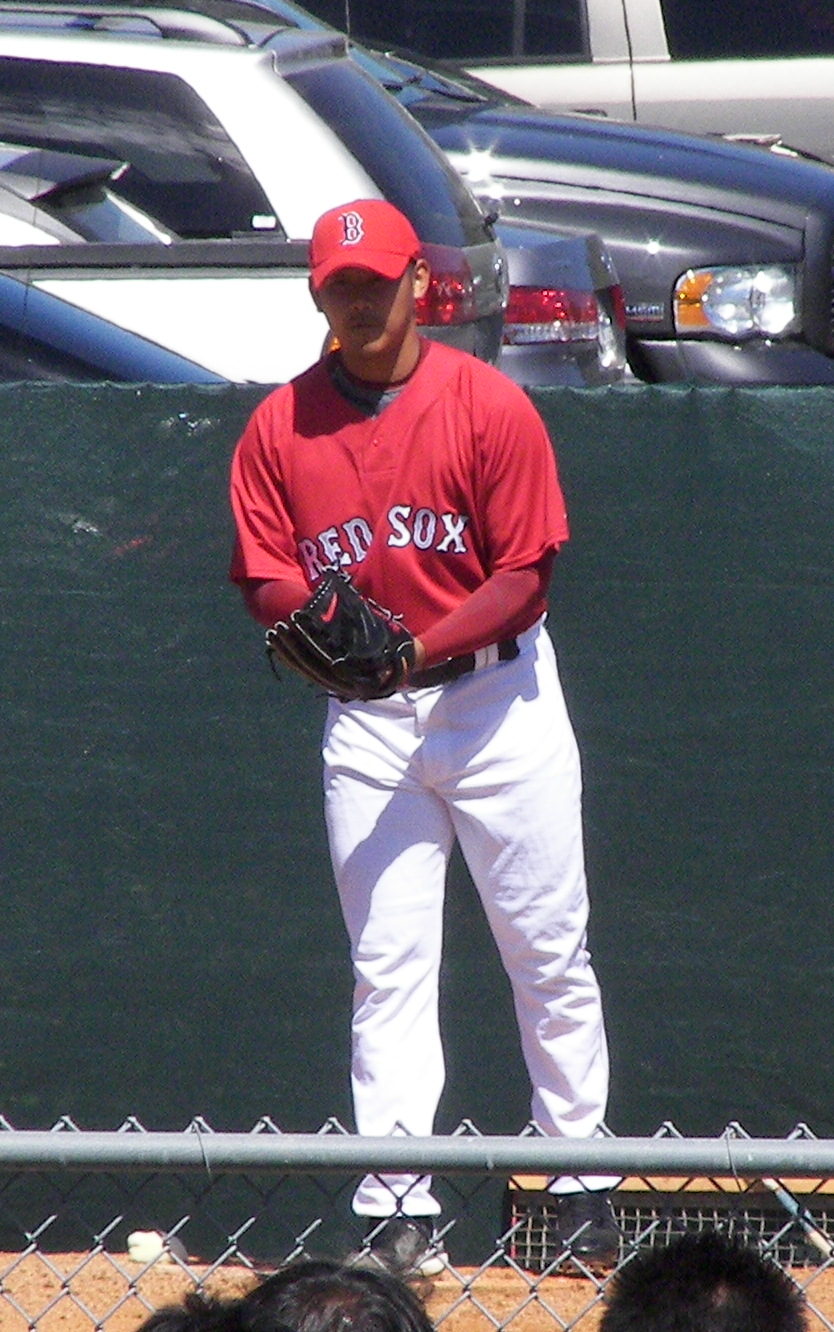
Matsuzaka in 2007 spring training

==== 2007 season ====
Matsuzaka's first major league spring training took place in Fort Myers, Florida, with the Red Sox during February and March 2007, wearing number 18. Matsuzaka pitched well in most of his exhibition starts. He wears number 18 because Masumi Kuwata also wears number 18. The number is traditionally worn by the ace of a pitching staff in Japan.

Matsuzaka made his first major league regular season start for the Red Sox on April 5, 2007, in an afternoon game against the Kansas City Royals at Kauffman Stadium. He walked one, recorded ten strikeouts, and at one point retired ten consecutive batters. He allowed only a solo home run on six hits while throwing 108 pitches (74 for strikes) over seven innings and recorded the win as the Red Sox triumphed by a score of 4–1. He was, however, beaten 3–0 by Félix Hernández (who pitched a one hitter), Ichiro Suzuki, Kenji Johjima, and their Seattle Mariners in his Fenway Park debut on April 11, 2007. He was defeated again, 2–1, by the Toronto Blue Jays in his third major league start despite striking out 10 Toronto hitters in only six innings pitched. Matsuzaka still became the only pitcher to strike out 10 or more batters in two of his first three big-league starts since Fernando Valenzuela did so in 1981.

In the official press conference after the Toronto start, Matsuzaka stated through his interpreter that gripping the American baseball—which is slightly larger than the Japanese pro ball, with higher seams—had presented some challenges, but that he had begun making adjustments and felt they were successful.

Matsuzaka pitched his first complete game in the major leagues on May 14, 2007, a 7–1 victory over the Detroit Tigers. He had pitched 72 complete games in Japan.

Matsuzaka signed a multimillion-dollar exclusive deal with trading card company Upper Deck. The terms of the deal were not disclosed.

On September 28, 2007, Matsuzaka went eight innings and threw 119 pitches. He allowed six hits and two runs while striking out eight. With the win against the Minnesota Twins to secure the Red Sox' place as the winner of the AL East, Matsuzaka closed out his first Major League season with a record of 15–12 and an ERA of 4.40.

On October 6, 2007, Matsuzaka made his Major League playoff debut in the 2007 ALDS, in front of his home crowd in Boston against the visiting Los Angeles Angels. Matsuzaka started the game but lasted just 4.2 innings, giving up three earned runs on seven hits before being pulled. Although Matsuzaka did not get the decision, the Red Sox eventually beat the Angels 6–3.

On October 15, 2007, Matsuzaka started in his second playoff game, in Game 3 of the 2007 ALCS against the Cleveland Indians in Cleveland. Much like his playoff debut, Matsuzaka delivered another mediocre outing. Again, Matsuzaka was not able to make it past five innings, lasting 4.2 innings while giving up four earned runs on six hits, and eventually suffered his first career playoff loss as the Indians beat the Red Sox 4–2. Matsuzaka fared better in Game 7 of the series, on October 21, 2007, retiring the first eight batters he faced. Matsuzaka pitched well for five innings, allowing two runs. The Red Sox won 11–2, to advance to the 2007 World Series against the Colorado Rockies. Matsuzaka is the first Japanese pitcher to win an MLB playoff game and only the fifth rookie to start a Game 7 in the playoffs.

On October 27, 2007, he started and led the Red Sox to a 10–5 win in Game 3 of the 2007 World Series against the Rockies, his first World Series appearance, giving up two runs on three hits while walking three and striking out five. In the game, he also recorded his first major league hit: a two-out two-run single off Josh Fogg, making Matsuzaka the third pitcher in Red Sox history to record two RBIs in a World Series game; the others were Babe Ruth (in Game 4 of the 1918 World Series) and Cy Young. Matsuzaka is also the first Japanese pitcher in World Series history to start and win a game. The next day, the Red Sox won the Series in Game 4. With 201 strikeouts, Matsuzaka ended the year with the Red Sox rookie record for strikeouts in a season.

==== 2008 season ====
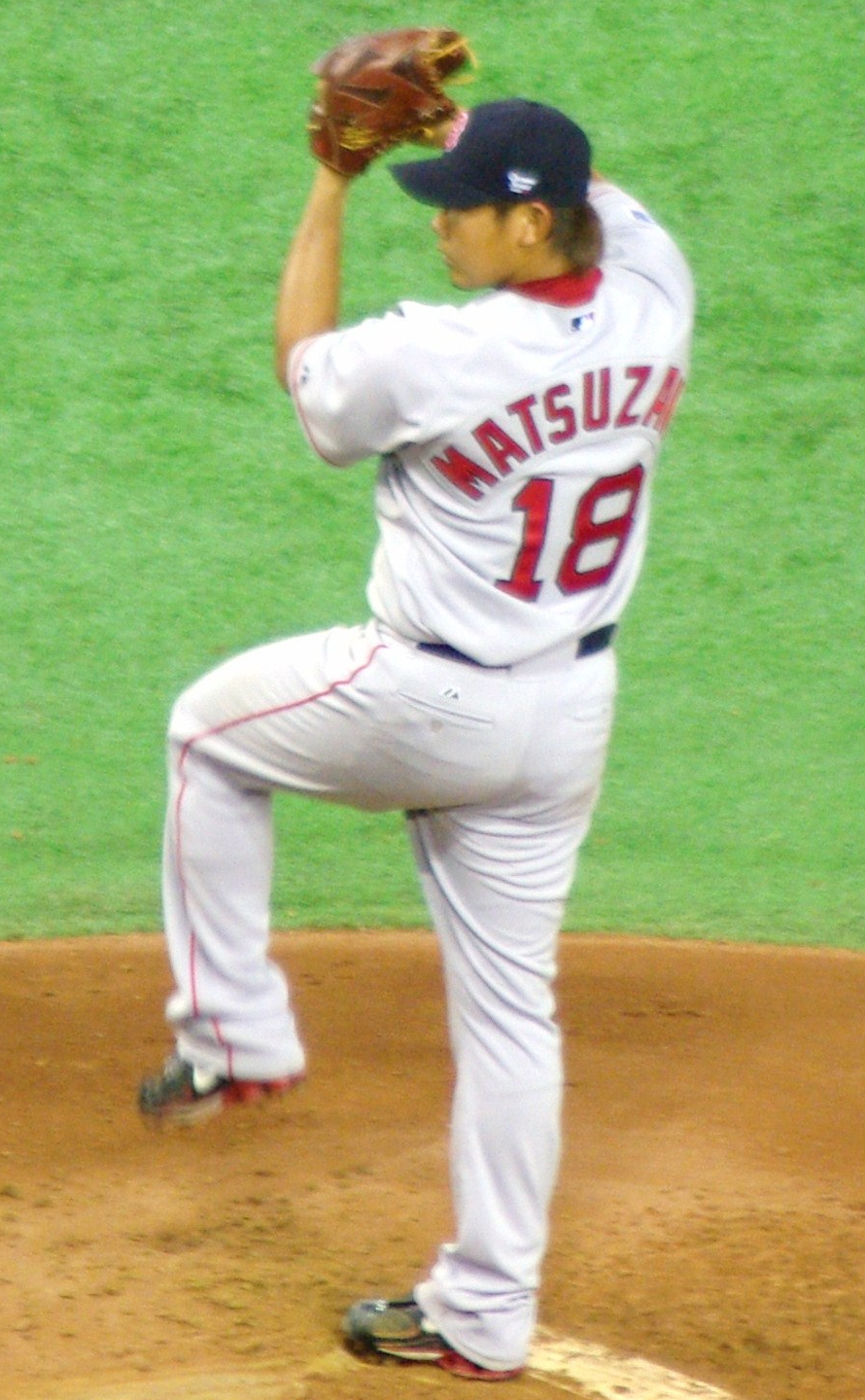
Daisuke Matsuzaka pitching for the Red Sox in 2008

In the beginning of 2008 season, Matsuzaka led the Red Sox pitching staff with eight consecutive wins without suffering a single loss. However, on May 27, he left the game against the Seattle Mariners in the bottom of the fifth inning due to a "tired shoulder". The game resulted in a 4–3 loss. The Red Sox placed Matsuzaka on the disabled list May 30, 2008, with a mild right rotator cuff strain. He returned on June 21 but was the losing pitcher after giving up seven earned runs in just one inning of work against the St. Louis Cardinals. Despite a record of 9–1 and a 3.12 ERA at the break, Matsuzaka was not selected to the 2008 American League All-Star team. On September 15, he won his 17th game of the season, setting a new single-season record for Japanese MLB pitchers, passing previous record holder Hideo Nomo.

Matsuzaka ended the season with an 18–3 record, 2.90 ERA and held opponents to a .211 batting average (and 6.9 hits-per-9-innings), the lowest in the majors. He also led the AL by leaving 80.6 percent of the baserunners he allowed stranded. These numbers were enough to place him fourth in the American League Cy Young Award race. However, a major problem for Matsuzaka was the control of his pitches, which, combined with his lack of innings pitched due to his injury, factored into his Cy Young voting. He walked 94 batters in 167 2/3 innings (a major-league-leading 13.1% of all batters he faced), even walking an eye-popping eight in one game against the Detroit Tigers on May 5. Eight times in the 2008 season, Matsuzaka surrendered walks to five or more batters in a game, and 12 times he walked three or more in a game. The interesting statistic is that Matsuzaka was 11–1 in the 16 starts he walked three or more batters, which was a testament to his ability to wiggle out of whatever trouble he got himself into.

Matsuzaka started Game 2 of the 2008 American League Division Series against the Los Angeles Angels of Anaheim and fared well over five-plus innings, handing the ball over to fellow countryman Hideki Okajima. However, Game 1 of the 2008 American League Championship Series was where Matsuzaka had his first solid postseason start. In seven-plus innings, he no-hit the Tampa Bay Rays before giving up a leadoff single to Carl Crawford in the seventh inning. Matsuzaka would earn the win in Boston's 2–0 win. However, at home in Game 5, Matsuzaka was rocked in four-plus innings for five runs on five hits, walking two, striking out two, and giving up three home runs to B.J. Upton, Carlos Peña, and Evan Longoria. Boston however staged a miracle comeback to win 8–7. The Rays went on to defeat the Red Sox in seven games to win the 2008 American League pennant.

==== 2009 season ====
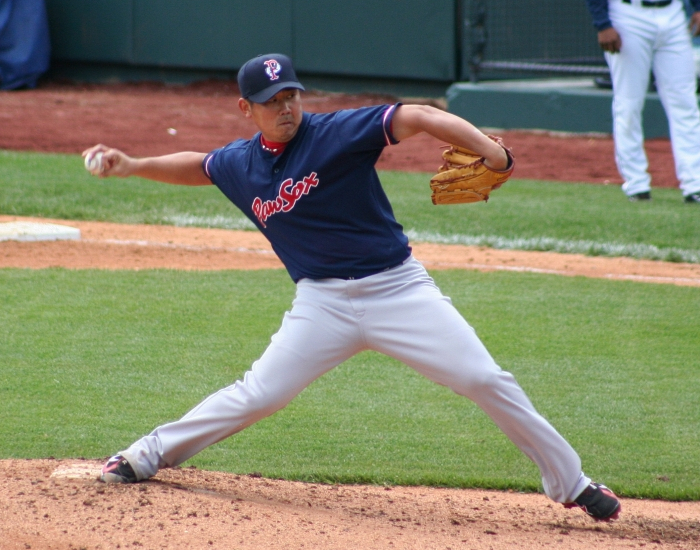
Matsuzaka pitching for the Pawtucket Red Sox, triple-A affiliates of the Boston Red Sox, in 2009

When Matsuzaka decided to pitch in the 2009 World Baseball Classic, the Red Sox were concerned with his decision being that it would cause him to miss a majority of spring training. Red Sox manager Terry Francona asked Team Japan manager Tatsunori Hara to keep him updated on Matsuzaka's condition along with limiting Matsuzaka's pitch count. Throughout the WBC, the Red Sox had limited access to Matsuzaka and decided not to press the issue more with Hara. Matsuzaka went on to lead Team Japan to victory earning the MVP award with a 3–0 record and 2.45 ERA.

On March 27, 2009, Matsuzaka reported to Red Sox spring training only twelve days before opening day. In Matsuzaka's first start of the regular season, he gave up three home runs against the Tampa Bay Rays, ultimately losing the game. In his next game against the Oakland Athletics, Matsuzaka only lasted one inning, giving up five hits, five runs, two walks, and striking out none. Matsuzaka was quickly placed on the DL, while reliever Justin Masterson took his spot in the rotation.

Matsuzaka made his next start on May 22, 2009, against the New York Mets after being activated off the DL. He gave up five runs over five innings, receiving another loss. Matsuzaka gained his first win of the season against the Detroit Tigers on June 2, 2009, but failed to produce any quality starts. After a loss against the Atlanta Braves on June 19, 2009, Matsuzaka was once again placed on the disabled list. Red Sox manager Terry Francona stated that Matsuzaka was placed on the DL due to "weakness" in his throwing arm possibly caused by the extensive pitching he did in the World Baseball Classic. Francona also made it clear that it would not be a "two-week DL" stating "We're going to have to figure this out. We have a lot of work ahead of us trying to get him back to being Daisuke."

As of his second placement on the DL in the 2009 season, Matsuzaka held a 1–5 record with an 8.23 ERA. With Matsuzaka's placement on the DL, it left a spot open in the starting rotation for John Smoltz to pitch in after being activated off the DL.

Although it has been suggested that the high number of innings pitched early in his career combined with a vigorous personal training regimen is a possible cause of Matsuzaka's sustained injury problems in 2009, Matsuzaka himself has stated publicly that he feels he cannot maintain arm strength without extensive training.

On September 15, 2009, Matsuzaka made his first start since June 19. He came and pitched his best outing of the season, pitching six plus shut out innings, striking out five, walking three, and giving up three hits. In October 2009, Matsuzaka revealed that he had in fact injured his hip joint but did not reveal when he got the injury.

In early January 2010, Matsuzaka was interviewed by Japanese magazine Friday. During the interview, Matsuzaka revealed that he had in fact injured his right hip while training for the '09 WBC. When asked why he concealed the injury from Team Japan trainers and coaches, Matsuzaka replied, "I didn't want to be the center of concern for people", and also added, "[The Classic] was hard. I relied on my wits and my shoulder strength. I had to be creative. I varied the paces between the pitches; I used the different kind of slider that I usually don't throw."

Matsuzaka also apologized to Red Sox fans, saying, "I am very sorry for making you worry. I assure you that the [2010] season will be a great season. I am going to redeem what I lost in 2009. With my health back, I am confident and determined to produce this year. I will [try my best to] become a world champion once again."

==== 2010 season ====
Matsuzaka missed the first month of the season due to a neck strain. He returned on May 1 against the Orioles and gave up seven runs, six earned, and seven hits in 4.2 innings. Matsuzaka would improve during the season in 2010, going 9–6 with a 4.69 ERA in 25 starts, but fell well below expectations in terms of consistency and efficiency.

==== 2011 season ====
On May 5, 2011, Matsuzaka made his first relief appearance of his MLB career picking up the loss in 1 inning against the Los Angeles Angels of Anaheim after a two and a half-hour rain delay. On May 17, 2011, Matsuzaka was placed on the 15-day disabled list. On June 2, it was reported that he would be out for the rest of the season due to Tommy John surgery. On June 10, Matsuzaka underwent the surgery.

==== 2012 season ====
On April 23, 2012, Matsuzaka made his first rehab start for the Single-A Salem Red Sox. He gave up a home run in each of his first two innings, and gave up three earned runs in four innings against the Wilmington Blue Rocks, an affiliate of the Kansas City Royals. After stints with both the Portland Sea Dogs and Pawtucket Red Sox, Matsuzaka was activated to make his first major league start of the season on June 9 in Fenway Park against the Washington Nationals, where he allowed four earned runs in five innings. He would finish the year with a very unimpressive record of 1–7 with an 8.28 ERA in 11 starts before becoming a free agent.

=== Cleveland Indians ===
On February 10, 2013, Matsuzaka agreed to a minor league deal with the Cleveland Indians, reuniting him with former Red Sox manager Terry Francona. He did not make the Indians' Opening Day roster, and was subsequently released from his contract, only to sign another minor league deal in March. Matsuzaka was released from the Indians' organization per his request on August 20.

=== New York Mets ===
==== 2013 season ====
On August 22, 2013, Matsuzaka agreed to a major league deal with the New York Mets, and joined their starting rotation. During his stint with the Mets in 2013, Matsuzaka posted a 3–3 record with an ERA of 4.42.

==== 2014 season ====
Matsuzaka agreed to a one-year minor league contract to stay with the Mets for the 2014 season on January 24, 2014. On April 16, 2014, Matsuzaka had his minor league contract purchased by the Mets, replacing pitcher John Lannan on the 40-man roster. On April 24, Matsuzaka earned his second career save (first was in Japan in 2000) in a 4–1 victory over the St. Louis Cardinals. After the game, Mets manager Terry Collins stated that Matsuzaka was the back up option to current closer Kyle Farnsworth. On May 14, Farnsworth was outrighted to Triple-A by the Mets, leaving the closer role up for grabs, and Matsuzaka as one of the candidates for the job. On May 25, Matsuzaka was given his first start as a Met after 14 relief appearances. In his start, Matsuzaka went six innings and gave up two earned runs on only three hits and got the win in a 4–2 victory over the Arizona Diamondbacks.

=== Fukuoka Softbank Hawks (2015–2017) ===
Matsuzaka signed a contract with the SoftBank Hawks on December 5, 2014, rejoining Nippon Professional Baseball after eight years in Major League Baseball. Hampered by injuries, Matsuzaka pitched in just one game for the Hawks' farm team in 2015. In 2016, Matsuzaka appeared in his first NPB game in 10 years. He pitched one inning for the Hawks and allowed two earned runs.

Matsuzaka was able to pitch only one game in three years for the Fukuoka SoftBank Hawks. On November 5, 2017, the Hawks released Matsuzaka.

=== Chunichi Dragons (2018–2019) ===
On January 23, 2018, Matsuzaka signed with the Chunichi Dragons. On April 5, Matsuzaka started his first game in Japan in 12 years against the Yomiuri Giants, pitching five innings and allowing three earned runs in a 3–2 loss. He was selected for the 2018 NPB All-Star game. After the season, he was awarded "The Best Comeback Prize" of NPB for his 6–4 record.

On October 4, 2019, Matsuzaka left the Dragons after failing to agree to a new deal.

=== Saitama Seibu Lions (second stint) (2020–2021) and retirement ===
On December 3, 2019, Matsuzaka signed a one-year contract to return to the Lions. Matsuzaka did not play in a game in 2020 after undergoing cervical spine surgery.

In December 2020, Matsuzaka re-signed with the Lions on a one-year deal for the 2021 season. On July 6, 2021, Matsuzaka announced that he would retire at the end of the season. According to sources close to Matsuzaka, he had no sensation in the fingers in his right hand and did not want to cause the team any more trouble. However, he was able to pitch one last time for the Lions in 2021, walking the only batter he faced in an October game.

On December 3, 2021, Matsuzaka formally announced his retirement in a ceremony; the ceremony included a surprise appearance by Ichiro Suzuki.

== International career ==
=== 2004 Olympic Games ===
He participated in the 2004 Olympic Games in Athens, Greece. However, he lost the semifinal game to Australia by the score of 1–0. His team later defeated Canada, earning the bronze medal for Japan.

=== 2006 World Baseball Classic ===
In 2006, Matsuzaka pitched for Japan in the inaugural World Baseball Classic. He was crowned the MVP of the first World Baseball Classic after Team Japan defeated Team Cuba 10–6 in the finals. Matsuzaka, the winner of the finale, threw 4 innings of 1 run baseball before exiting. Overall, Matsuzaka pitched a total of 13 innings throughout the tournament while finishing with 3 wins and no losses. There had been talk of Matsuzaka wanting to go to Major League Baseball before the '06 WBC, and the tournament allowed Matsuzaka to show his skills on the worldwide stage. Interest in Matsuzaka from MLB teams boomed after his performance throughout the WBC.

=== 2009 World Baseball Classic ===
Matsuzaka was a member of the Japanese team at the 2009 World Baseball Classic, playing a key role as they successfully defended their title. He also won his second World Baseball Classic MVP award, finishing the tournament with a 3–0 record and a 2.45 ERA. In all, he pitched 14 2/3 innings, allowing 4 runs on 14 hits with 5 walks and 13 strikeouts.

=== 2013 World Baseball Classic ===
Daisuke chose not to play for the Japanese team at the 2013 World Baseball Classic. The team advanced to the semifinal round without Matsuzaka, but failed to claim their third consecutive championship when they lost to Puerto Rico 3–1 in the semifinal round.

== Playing style ==
=== Pitching ===
Matsuzaka is a right-handed pitcher who throws from a three-quarter arm slot in a drop-and-drive motion. He has numerous pitches in his repertoire: a four-seam fastball that sits at 90–94 mph (topped out at 97 mph in his first few years in Boston), a two-seam fastball in the low 90s, a cutter in the high 80s, a rare gyroball in the low 80s, and a changeup.

=== Batting ===
Matsuzaka was an accomplished hitter in high school and he got his first hit in his first career at-bat, a single to center, in a game against the Orix BlueWave when the Lions ran out of bench players and had to allow him to hit for himself. The Pacific League employs the designated hitter rule. Matsuzaka's first pro home run came in an interleague game against Hanshin Tigers pitcher Darwin Cubillán at spacious Koshien Stadium on June 9, 2006. That footage can be seen in the external links section.

Matsuzaka had his first hit with the Red Sox on May 23, 2010, in Philadelphia. He also was tremendous in the post-season with his bat. He drove in two runs with a single in Game 3 of the 2007 World Series, during a six-run third inning, powering the Red Sox to a victory.

== Personal life ==
Matsuzaka is married to television journalist Tomoyo Shibata, formerly of Nippon TV in Japan, and in 2005 she gave birth to the couple's daughter. He also has a son, born on March 15, 2008.

Matsuzaka became involved in a scandal when he began dating Shibata. On September 13, 2000, he drove to her apartment without a valid license. He illegally parked his car and it got towed, and then had a team official take the blame to avoid a scandal. The truth soon got out and he was fined 195,000 yen by the police and put under house arrest for one month by the Lions.

In response to the 2011 Tōhoku earthquake and tsunami, Daisuke gave a charitable donation of $1 million to the Japanese Red Cross via the Red Sox Foundation. "Our efforts on the field are dedicated to all who are suffering from this catastrophe. We are in this together, so we must overcome tragedy together." Matsuzaka said in a video message. He joined with the 3 other Red Sox pitchers, team captain Jason Varitek, and other members of the Red Sox staff to collect fan donations at the gates of two spring training games at City of Palms Park, where they collected more than $4,600 in fan donations.

== See also ==
- List of Major League Baseball players from Japan
- List of World Series starting pitchers
- Eiji Sawamura Award
- Nippon Professional Baseball Rookie of the Year Award

Awards and achievements
Preceded by N/A; Daisuke Matsuzaka	World Baseball Classic MVP; 2006; 2009	Succeeded by Daisuke Matsuzaka; Robinson Canó
Preceded by Curt Schilling	Boston Red Sox Opening Day starting pitcher 2008	Succeeded by Josh Beckett
Preceded by Érik Bédard	AL hits per nine innings 2008	Succeeded by Félix Hernández
