= Senbatsu =

Senbatsu may refer to:

- Japanese High School Baseball Invitational Tournament (senbatsu kōtō gakkō yakyū taikai), a Japanese high school baseball tournament
- Senbatsu Sousenkyo, the selection general election of the most popular AKB48 member contested until 2018
