= Tomoyo Shibata =

Japanese television announcer (born 1974)

Tomoyo Shibata (柴田 倫世, Shibata Tomoyo; born December 23, 1974 in Chikushino, Fukuoka, Japan, official name Tomoyo Matsuzaka) is a former announcer for Nippon TV in Japan.

Shibata is married to baseball pitcher Daisuke Matsuzaka. They met during the 2000 Sydney Olympics, married in 2005, and have two children, one daughter and one son.

While secretly dating in 2000, Shibata became embroiled in a national scandal with Matsuzaka. On August 30, 2000, Matsuzaka's drivers license was suspended for the next two months for a speeding violation of greater than 50 km/h over the legal limit. Two weeks into the suspension, on September 13, 2000, Matsuzaka drove a car owned by the Seibu Lions to Shibata's home although he did not possess a valid driver's license at the time. During the overnight visit, Matsuzaka illegally parked his car outside Shibata's home. His car was ticketed and towed by the police, and to cover up the offense Akira Kuroiwa, then Public Relations Manager for the team, lied to the police that Kuroiwa operated the car and committed the parking violation that night. The cover-up was blown by a tabloid whose photojournalist recorded the whole incident. Both men were prosecuted, and Matsuzaka paid 195,000 yen in fine. Details of the story caused a scandal, embarrassing Matsuzaka and his team, the Seibu Lions.
