= Masaru Kageura =

Japanese baseball player (1915–1945)

Masaru Kageura 景浦 將
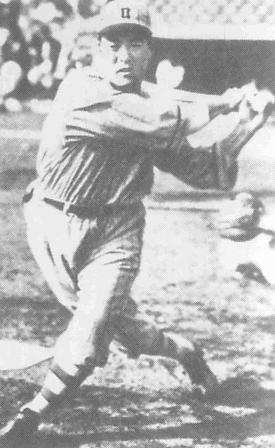

Hanshin Tigers
- Outfielder, Infielder, Pitcher
- Born: July 20, 1915; Matsuyama, Japan
- Died: May 20, 1945 (aged 29); Luzon, Philippines
- Batted: Right Threw: Right

JBL debut
- 1936, for the Osaka Tigers

Last JBL appearance
- 1943, for the Hanshin Tigers

Career hitting statistics
- Batting average: .271
- Hits: 307
- Home runs: 25
- Runs batted in: 222

Career pitching statistics
- Win–loss record: 27-9
- ERA: 1.57
- Strikeouts: 134
- Stats at Baseball Reference

Teams
- As player: Hanshin/Osaka Tigers (1936–1938, 1943)

Career highlights and awards
- E.R.A. title (1936)

Member of the Japanese

Baseball Hall of Fame
- Induction: 1965

Masaru Kageura (景浦 將, Kageura Masaru; July 20, 1915 – May 20, 1945) was a Japanese baseball player from Matsuyama, Ehime. An accomplished two-way player, Kaguera is one of two players (Eiji Sawamura being the other) who was inducted into the Japanese Baseball Hall of Fame after being killed in World War II.

Kageura's team reached the finals in the 1932 National High School Baseball Championship, but his team was defeated by Masao Yoshida in the championship game.

After getting his degree at Rikkyo University, Kageura joined the Tigers of the nascent Japanese Baseball League (JBL) and he was a good rival for Eiji Sawamura of the Giants. Kageura won the 1936 JBL ERA title with a 0.79 mark. He did not play in the JBL from 1939 to 1942, returning to the Tigers for the 1943 season (although he did not pitch that season).

Kageura was killed in the Battle of Luzon, in the Philippines, in World War II. He was inducted into the Japanese Baseball Hall of Fame by the Special Committee in 1965.
