= Masao Yoshida (baseball) =

Japanese baseball player

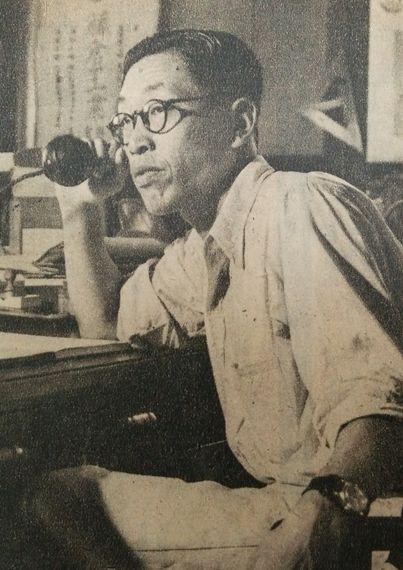
- Uchimura in 1934
- Born: April 14, 1914; Aichi Prefecture, Japan
- Died: May 23, 1996 (aged 82)

Member of the Japanese

Baseball Hall of Fame
- Induction: 1992

Masao Yoshida (吉田 正男, Yoshida Masao; April 14, 1914 – May 23, 1996) was a Japanese amateur pitcher originally from Ichinomiya, Aichi. He had 23 wins at Spring and Summer Koshien. In the National High School Baseball Championship between 1931 and 1933, he won 14 consecutive games at Koshien Stadium and he became the only pitcher to win three consecutive championships.

== Three consecutive high school championships ==
Yoshida entered Chukyo Shogyo. He defeated Yoshiyuki Iwamoto's Kōryō in his quarterfinal game of 1931. He won the first championship in 1931.

He defeated Masaru Kageura's Matsuyama Shogyo in his final game of 1932 and won the second championship in 1932.

He defeated Fumio Fujimura's Taishō in his quarterfinal game of 1933. On August 19, 1933, Yoshida pitched a shutout with 336 pitches and 25 innings in his semifinal game against Akashi. Although he was exhausted by this game, he achieved his third consecutive championship the next day.

== Later career and HOF induction ==
He never joined Nippon Professional Baseball, instead continuing to play as an amateur pitcher. He moved to the outfield when attending Meiji University, where he contributed to championships. He pitched again for Fujikura Electric Wire and the intercity baseball tournament, making his mark on amateur baseball. Later on, he became a reporter for Chunichi Sports Newspaper.

In honor of his unprecedented pitching at Koshien, Yoshida was inducted to the Japanese Baseball Hall of Fame in 1992. No high schools have ever achieved three consecutive victories since Yoshida's team recorded the feat.
