= Eiji Bandō =

Japanese television entertainer and baseball player (1940–2026)

Eiji Bandō 板東 英二
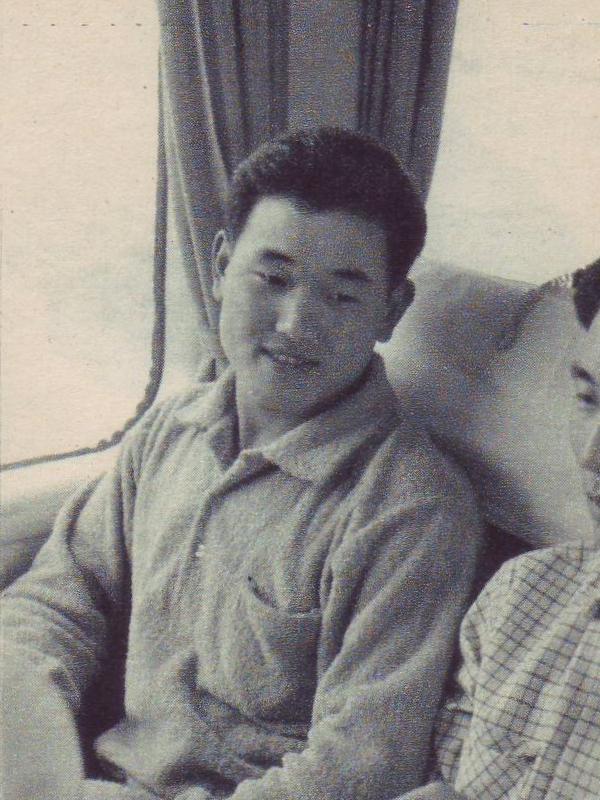
- Bandō in 1959
- Pitcher
- Born: April 5, 1940; Hulin, Manchukuo
- Died: July 22, 2026 (aged 86)
- Batted: Right Threw: Right

NPB debut
- 1959, for the Chunichi Dragons

Last appearance
- 1969, for the Chunichi Dragons

NPB statistics
- Win–loss: 77-65
- ERA: 2.89
- Strikeouts: 748
- Stats at Baseball Reference

Teams
- Chunichi Dragons (1959 – 1969)

Eiji Bandō (板東 英二, Bandō Eiji; April 5, 1940 – July 22, 2026) was a Japanese television entertainer, baseball player and YouTuber. He pitched many innings in his high school career. The Japan High School Baseball Federation was afraid that he would injure his arm, so they set a new rematch rule in 1958. However, he pitched 18 innings in a 1958 quarterfinal game, which resulted in the first rematch in the National High School Baseball Championship. He reached the final, but did not win. His record of 83 strikeouts in the tournament remains unbroken. He joined Chunichi Dragons but it is said that he did not regain his pitching strength. He could not extend his elbow even then.

Bandō died from chronic heart failure on July 22, 2026, at the age of 86.

== Work ==
=== Singles ===
- "Moeyo Dragons!" – 1974

=== Information ===
- Doyō Daisuki! 830 (Kansai TV) – 1987–1997

=== Variety show ===
- Sunday Dragons (CBC) – 1983––present
- Unbelievable (Fuji TV) – 1997–1998

=== Game show ===
- Sekai Fushigi Hakken! (TBS) – 1986––present
- Magical Brain Power !! (Nippon TV) – 1990–1999, 2001
