= Third Junior & Senior High School of Nihon University =

Japanese private school attached to Nihon University

Coordinates: 35.592°N 139.420°E

Third Junior & Senior High School of Nihon University (日本大学第三中学校・高等学校, Nihon Daigaku Daisan Chūgakkō Kōtōgakkō) is a junior and senior high school in Machida, Tokyo, affiliated with Nihon University.

It first opened in Akasaka in Tokyo City in 1929. In 1976 it moved to Machida. It began admitting both boys and girls in 1987; previously it only admitted male students.

== Campus ==
It includes an American football field that opened in 2000.

== Media & Publications ==
- Nihon University Third Junior and Senior High School School Information Pamphlet (Japanese: 日本大学第三中学校高等学校 学校案内 パンフレット 日本大学の付属校 日大三中 日大三高 日三)
