= Koyo Gakuin High School =

Private boys' school in Japan

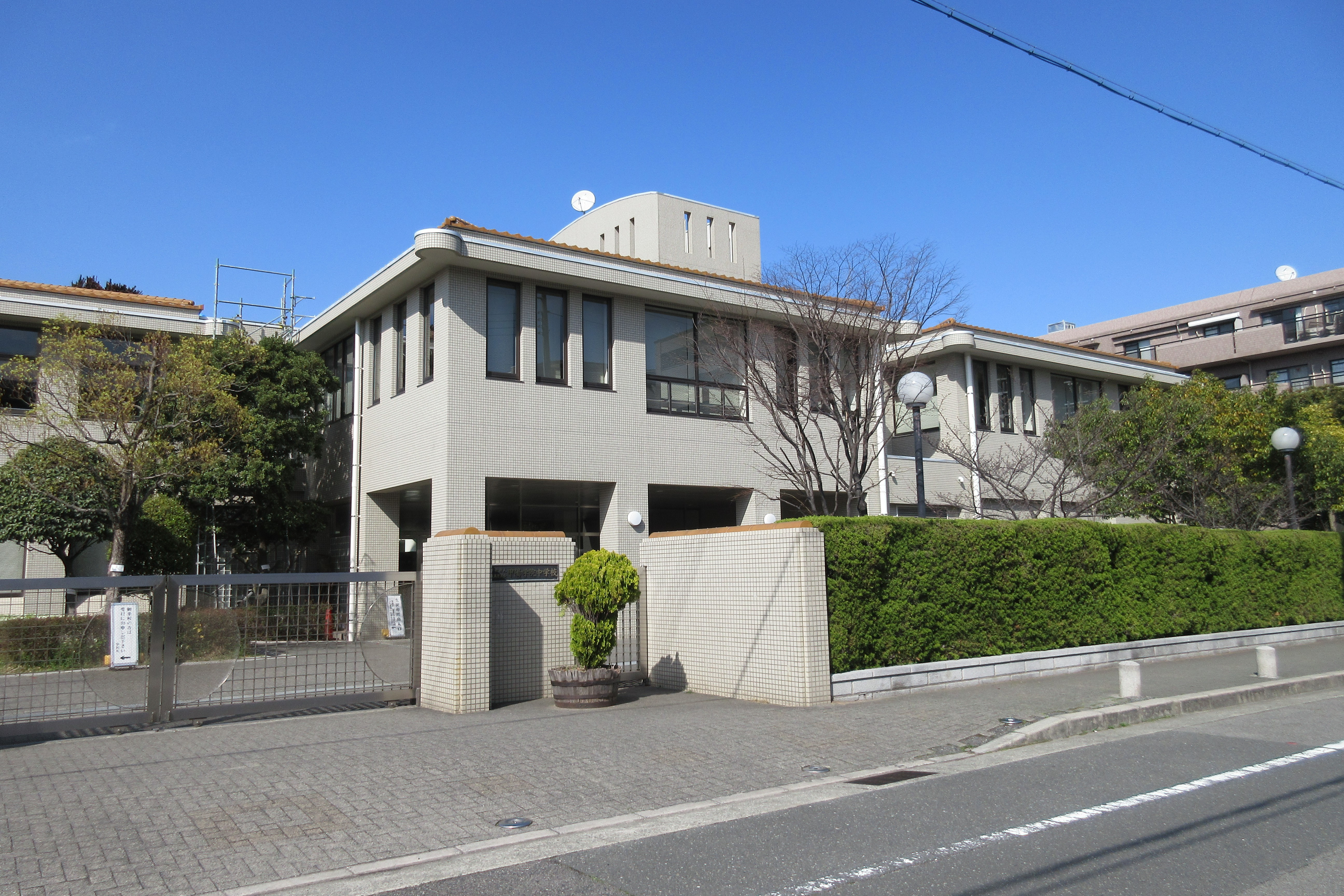

Koyo Gakuin High School (甲陽学院高等学校, Kōyō-gakuin kōtō-gakkō) is a male-only high school located in Nishinomiya, Hyōgo Prefecture, Japan. It was founded as a middle school in 1917 by Komakichiro Iga, with support from the Tatsu-uma family, owners of the Hakushika brand of Japanese Refined sake, since 1920. The school is administered by the Scholarship Society of Tatsu-uma Institution (学校法人辰馬育英会, Gakkō-hounin Tatsuuma ikueikai). It was reorganized into junior and senior high schools under the educational reforms of 1948.
