= Koshien Stadium =

Baseball park in Nishinomiya, Japan

Hanshin Koshien Stadium

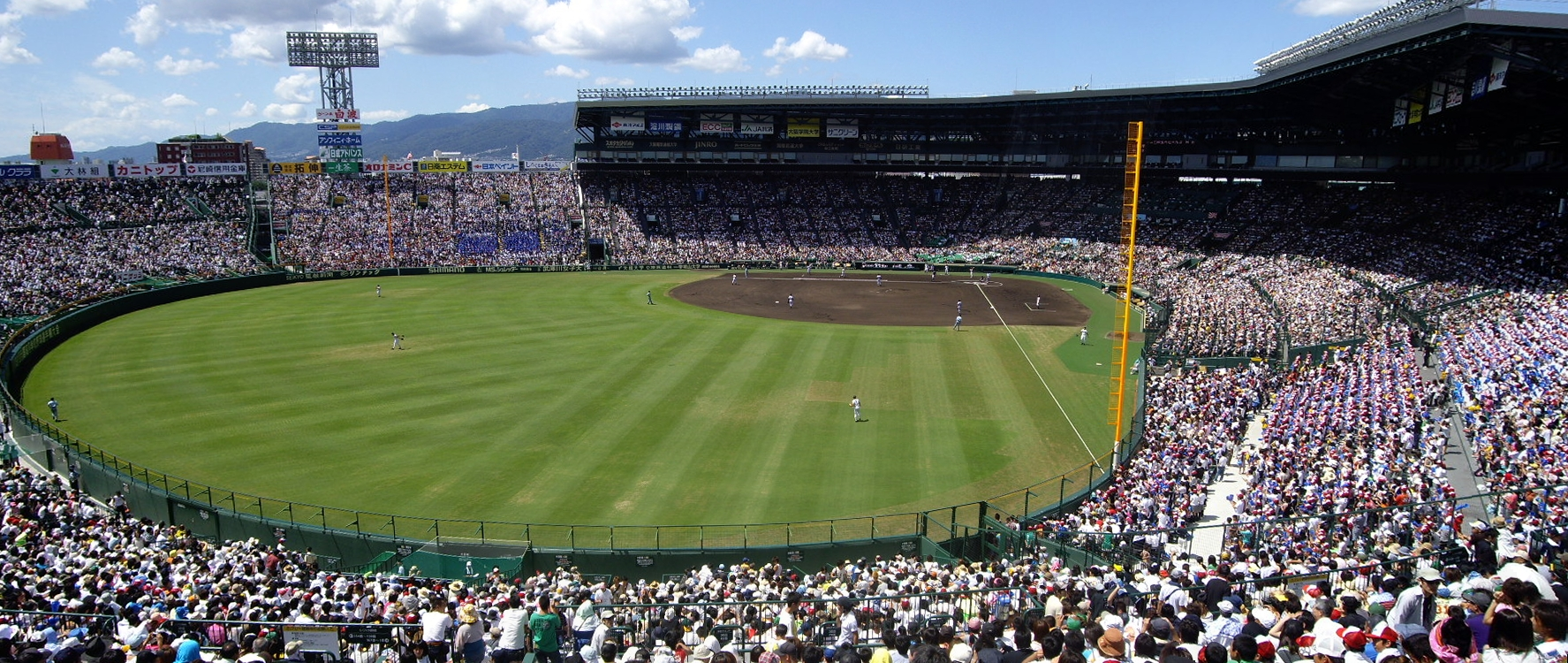
- Interactive map of Hanshin Koshien Stadium
- Former names: Koshien Large Sports Field (1924–); Koshien Stadium (–1964)
- Address: 1-82 Koshien-cho
- Location: Nishinomiya, Hyōgo, Japan
- Coordinates: 34°43′17″N 135°21′42″E
- Owner: Hanshin Electric Railway Co., Ltd.
- Operator: Hanshin Tigers Co. Hanshin Engei Co.
- Capacity: approx. 60,000 (from the opening) approx. 80,000 (after the completion of all the seats) approx. 55,000 (–2001) approx. 53,000 (2003); 50,454 (2002, 2004–2007); 46,229 (2008); 47,808 (2009–2011); 47,757 (2012–?); 47,400
- Field size: Left Field — 95 m (312 ft); Left Center Field — 118 m (387 ft); Center Field — 118 m (387 ft); Right Center Field — 118 m (387 ft); Right Field — 95 m (312 ft)
- Public transit: Hanshin Electric Railway: Hanshin Main Line at Koshien
- Parking: None

Construction
- Opened: 1 August 1924
- Expanded: 2007–2010
- Architect: Ōbayashi gumi

Tenants
- Hanshin Tigers (Central League/NPB) – (1936–present); National High School Baseball Championship (Koyaren) – (1924–1940, 1947–present); National High School Baseball Invitational Tournament (Koyaren) – (1925–present)

Website
- https://koshien.hanshin.co.jp/

Hanshin Koshien Stadium (阪神甲子園球場, Hanshin Kōshien Kyūjō), commonly referred to as simply Koshien Stadium, is a baseball stadium located near Kobe in Nishinomiya, Hyōgo Prefecture, Japan. The stadium was built to host the national high school baseball tournaments, and opened on 1 August 1924 – the name Kōshien (甲子園) comes from said year rendered as the first pairing in the sexagenary cycle system i.e. kōshi (甲子) or Wood Rat. It was the largest stadium in Asia at the time it was completed, with a capacity of 55,000.

The design of the stadium was heavily influenced by the Polo Grounds in New York City. In 1936 it became the home stadium for the Osaka Tigers (current Hanshin Tigers), now with the Central League. On 14 February 1964, Hanshin, the Tigers' owners, was appended to the name of Koshien Stadium.

In addition to the annual National High School Baseball Championship, played in August, the stadium hosts the annual National High School Baseball Invitational Tournament in March, a smaller, invitational tournament. Both tournaments are generally known simply as Kōshien. The high school tournaments are given a higher priority, with any tournament games that need to be rescheduled forcing the Tigers to postpone conflicting home games. It also hosts Japan's American college football national championship game, the Koshien Bowl.

Legendary baseball player Babe Ruth played an exhibition game at Koshien on his Japan tour in 1934. There is a plaque at the stadium commemorating the event.

== Repairs ==
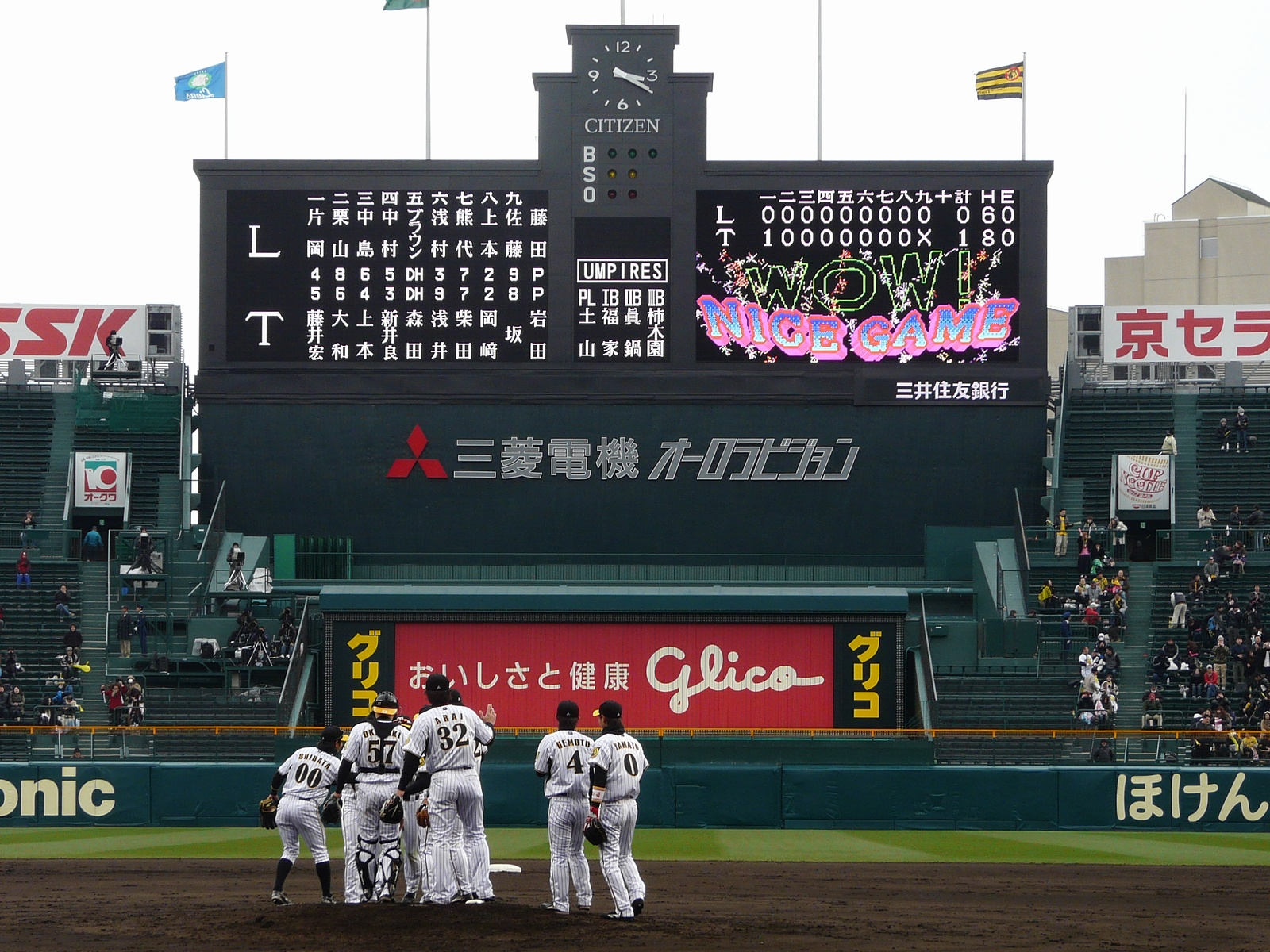
Koshien Stadium scoreboard

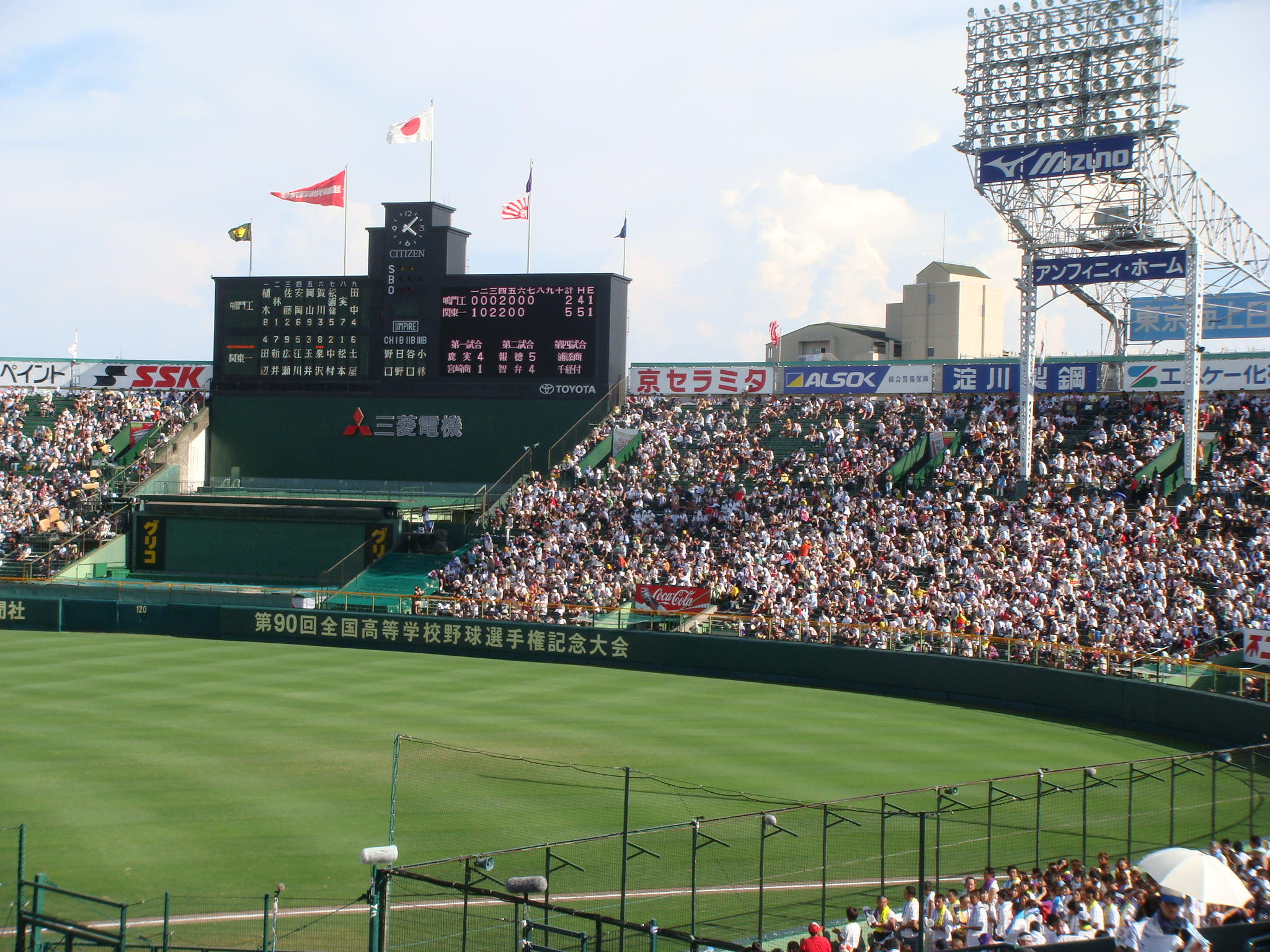
Scoreboard and outfield bleachers

The Great Hanshin earthquake of 1995 affected Kōshien. Cracks appeared and part of the stands collapsed. In July 2004, a concrete plan surfaced for improvement of the complete baseball ground facilities.

Construction began during the off-season of 2008 while the stadium continued to be used for baseball. Later stages followed during the off-season, and the large-scale construction was completed in 2010.

The main points of the plan are as follows:

- As much as possible, the present conditions of the baseball grounds are to be preserved, including the Wrigley Field-inspired ivy, which has become a symbol of the stadium.
- The infield continues to be all-dirt.
- The outfield continues to be natural grass and be open to the air (no roof over the grounds).
- The Ginsan roof over the grandstand was removed and replaced with a modern Ginsan roof without pillars.
- The seating capacity was reduced to 47,808 people to help make the stadium barrier-free.

== Price ranges ==
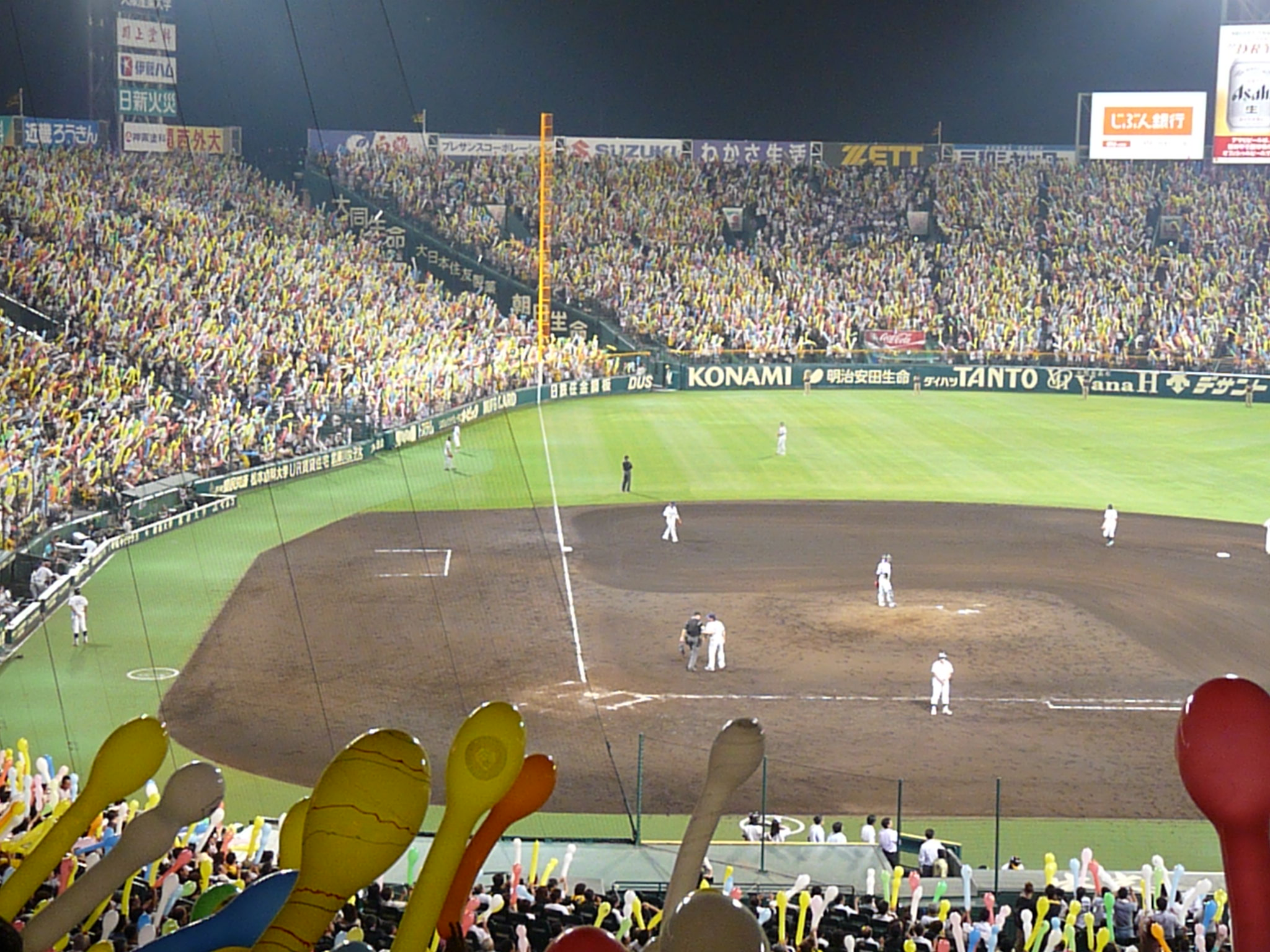
Fans about to release balloons during the 7th inning stretch

The stadium has four seating price ranges.

The top seats are the green seats (sold in season tickets) directly behind home plate and under the Ginsan roof. These seats are entirely covered and corporate. The seats in the infield are colored green on the first base side and the third base side under the Ginsan roof and called "Ivy Seat". Both sides are ¥4,000. The outfield benches along the lines are called the "Alps" and they are ¥2,500. The outfield seats are ¥1,900.

As with all Japanese stadiums, the home supporters sit in right field and the away supporters in left field. However, even if the opponents are the Yomiuri Giants, the away supporters rarely constitute more than one section high up in left field. On most nights the stadium is jam-packed with cramped seating.

== Appearances in fiction ==
Due to its reputation as the main stage of high school baseball, Koshien plays a big part in many baseball manga series, including Touch, Cross Game and H2 by Mitsuru Adachi and in other author's works like Higuchi Asa's Ōkiku Furikabutte and Rookies by Masanori Morita and Ace of Diamond by Yuji Terajima. It was talked about in Major where Koshien is the aim of all high school baseball teams to play there.

The park plays a part, in name, in the anime Princess Nine. The events of the two-hour Detective Conan special episode "Miracle at Koshien Ball Park! The Defiants Face the Dark Demon" take place in the stadium. In the light novel and anime adaptation of Melancholy of Haruhi Suzumiya (specifically the episode "Melancholy of Haruhi Suzumiya Part 5"), Haruhi's explanation of why she searches for the supernatural involves a baseball game she viewed with her family in Koshien.

The stadium appears as a stage in the fighting game The King of Fighters '97, crowded and adapted for the KOF tournament, with the fighters standing on a catwalk-like structure. In Nodame Cantabile, the heroine Megumi Noda kept a bag of soil from Koshien Stadium. In Angel Beats! Hinata says he was part of a baseball team that was aiming to play in Koshien. In Silver Spoon, Ichiro Komaba is determined to get his baseball team to Koshien to go pro and make money for his family farm.

In an episode of the Netflix anime series Devilman Crybaby it is featured as the arena for a track and field event.

It is the home stadium for Osaka Tempters in Gurazeni.

== Access ==
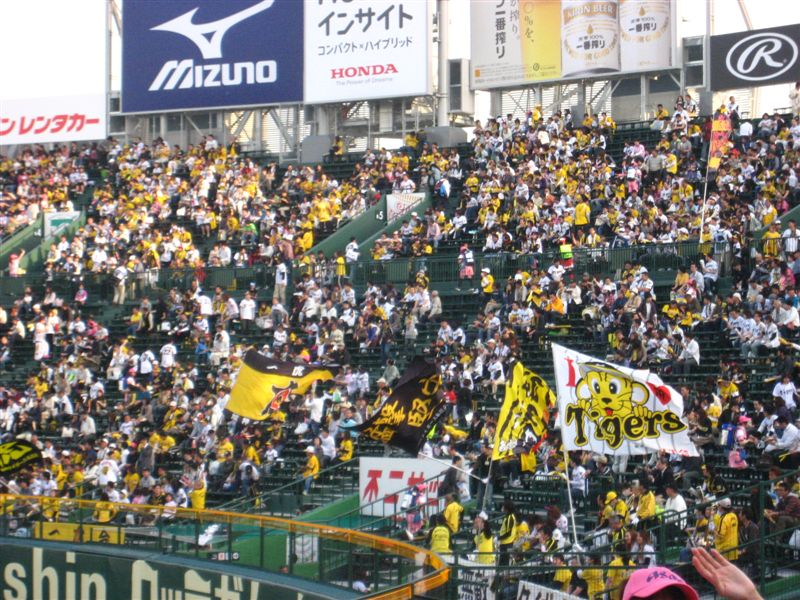
The fans of Koshien Stadium

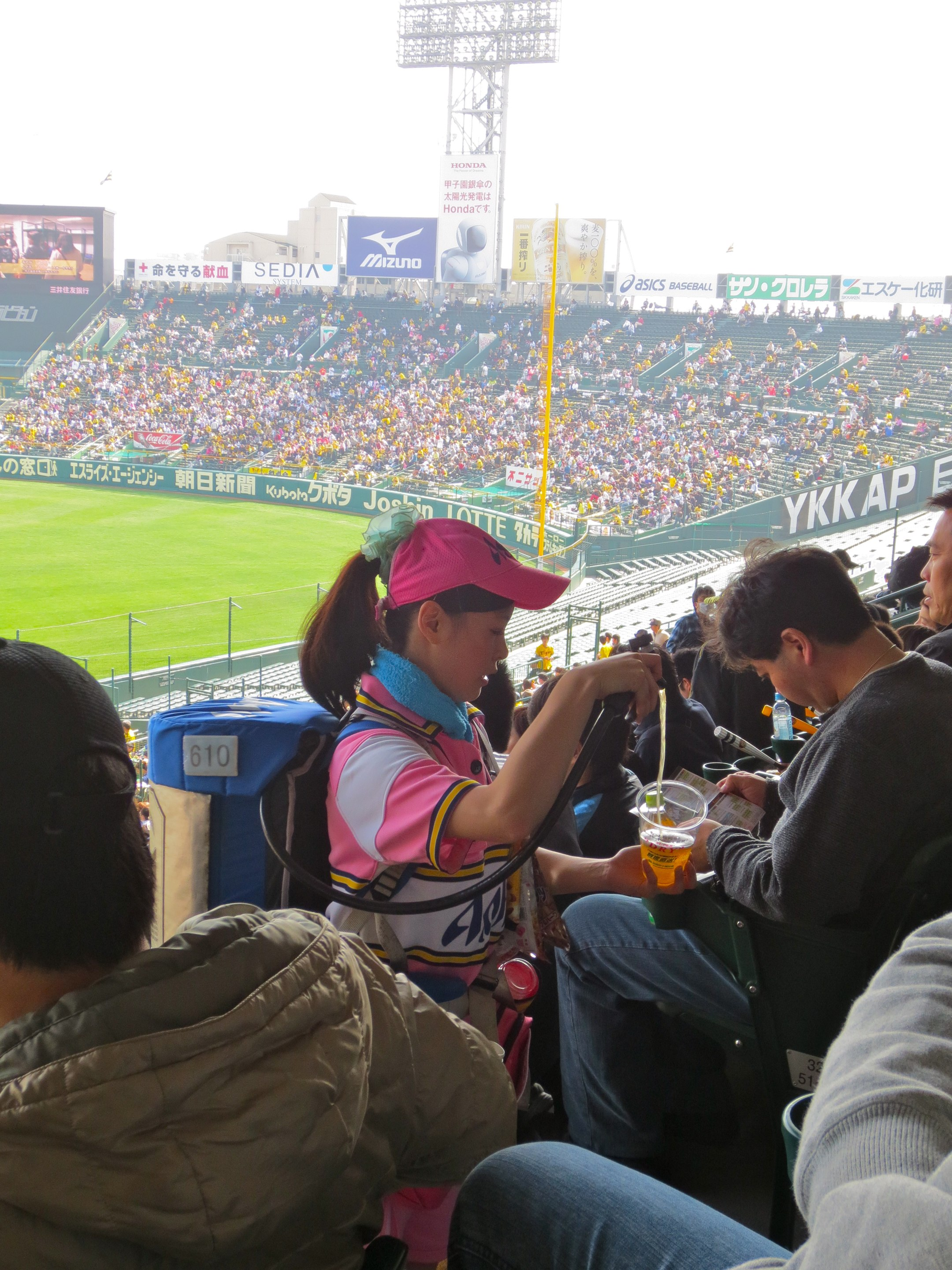
One of the Stadium's beer vendors

Koshien Stadium is a two-minute walk from Koshien Station on the Hanshin Main Line. There is no parking lot at the stadium. Regular television commercials during game broadcasts encourage the public to use public transportation.

== Attendances ==
The home attendances of the Hanshin Tigers at the Koshien Stadium:

Season	Games	Total attendance	Average attendance
2025	71	2,962,268	41,722

== See also ==
- High school baseball in Japan
- Koshien Bowl
- Lists of stadiums

Preceded by —	The home of the Hanshin Tigers; 1936–present	Succeeded by —
Preceded by First site	Site of the Koshien Bowl; 1947–1959	Succeeded by Nishinomiya
Preceded by Nishinomiya	Site of the Koshien Bowl; 1961–2006	Succeeded by Nagai
Preceded by Nagai	Site of the Koshien Bowl; 2009–present	Succeeded by —
