= Japan High School Baseball Federation =

Japanese governing body of high school baseball

Japan High School Baseball Federation 日本高等学校野球連盟

- logo (top) and Flag (Bottom) of Koyaren, flag is used on tournaments alongside Japan Flag, Organizer Flag and Schools Flags
- Abbreviation: "Kōyaren" (高野連)
- Founded: February 1946
- Founder: Asahi Shimbun; Mainichi Shimbun (Note: Mainichi and Asahi organized the Spring Koshien and Summer Koshien tournaments independently until that, in 1946, they decided to create an independent federation to co-organize both tournaments with them)
- Type: National sports federation
- Location: 1-chōme−22−25, Edobori, Nishi-ku, Japan
- Members: Around 3700+ schools
- President: Kaoru Takara
- Affiliations: Baseball Federation of Japan; Japan Student Baseball Association
- Website: www.jhbf.or.jp
- Formerly called: 全国中等学校野球連盟 (1946-1947) 全国高等学校野球連盟 (1947-1963) 財団法人日本高等学校野球連盟 (1963-2012)

The Japan High School Baseball Federation (日本高等学校野球連盟, Nihon kōtō gakkō yakyū renmei) is the governing body of high school baseball in Japan, and is composed of the High School Baseball Federations of each of the 47 prefectures. Together with the All Japan University Baseball Federation (財団法人全日本大学野球連盟, zaidan hōjin zen-nihon daigaku yakyū renmei), it makes up the Japan Student Baseball Association (日本学生野球協会, nihon gakusei yakyū kyōkai). The name is often abbreviated to "Nihon Kōyaren" (日本高野連) or just "Kōyaren" (高野連).

== Brief history ==
The Kōyaren evolved from the All-Japan Secondary School Baseball Federation (全日本中等学校野球連盟 zen-nihon chutōgakkō yakyu renmei), which was formed in 1946 to oversee the National Secondary School Baseball Championship organized by Osaka Asahi Shimbun before the war.

Due to the outcome of World War II, in 1947 the school system was overhauled, and "secondary schools" became "high schools". Thus the federation was renamed to the All-Japan High School Baseball Federation.

In 1963, the federation became a private foundation separate from the Ministry of Education.

== Timeline ==
- 1915.08 National Secondary School Baseball Championship first held (organized by the Osaka Asahi Shimbun)
- 1924.04 National Secondary School Baseball Invitational Tournament first held (organized by the Osaka Mainichi Shimbun)
- 1924.08 Koshien Stadium completed and becomes host to both tournaments
- 1946.02 All-Japan Secondary School Baseball Federation founded
- 1946.12 Japan Students Baseball Association becomes the parent organization
- 1947.04 In accordance with the school system reform the name changes to the All-Japan High School Baseball Federation
- 1956.08 National High School Soft-baseball Tournament first held
- 1963.02 Accompanying the privatization, the name becomes the Japan High School Baseball Federation
- 1978.08 National High School Soft-baseball Tournament renamed to the Japan High School Soft-baseball Championship

== Tournaments organized ==
- National High School Baseball Championship (全国高等学校野球選手権大会 zen-nihon kōtō gakkō yakyū senshu-ken taikai)
- National High School Baseball Invitational Tournament (選抜高等学校野球大会 senbatsu kōtō gakkō yakyū taikai)
- National High School Rubber Ball Baseball Championship (全国高等学校軟式野球選手権大会 zen-nihon kōtō gakkō nanshiki yakyū senshu-ken taikai)

== See also ==
- High school baseball in Japan
