= Japanese High School Baseball Invitational Tournament =

Japanese Spring High School Baseball Tournament

Coordinates: 34°43′16.34″N 135°21′41.84″E

The National High School Baseball Invitational Tournament
- Alternative logo made for Mainichi coverage of the tournament
- Sport: Baseball
- Founded: 1924
- No. of teams: 32 (36 in special editions)
- Country: Japan
- Venue: Hanshin Koshien Stadium
- Most recent champion: Osaka Toin - 98th (2026)
- Most titles: Toho High School (5 Titles)
- Broadcasters: NHK; MBS; Gaora
- Streaming partners: Yahoo Japan; SPORTS BULL; TVer; DAZN
- Related competitions: The National High School Baseball Championship
- Website: https://mainichi.jp/koshien/senbatsu https://baseball.yahoo.co.jp/hsb_spring/ https://sportsbull.jp/live/senbatsu2026/

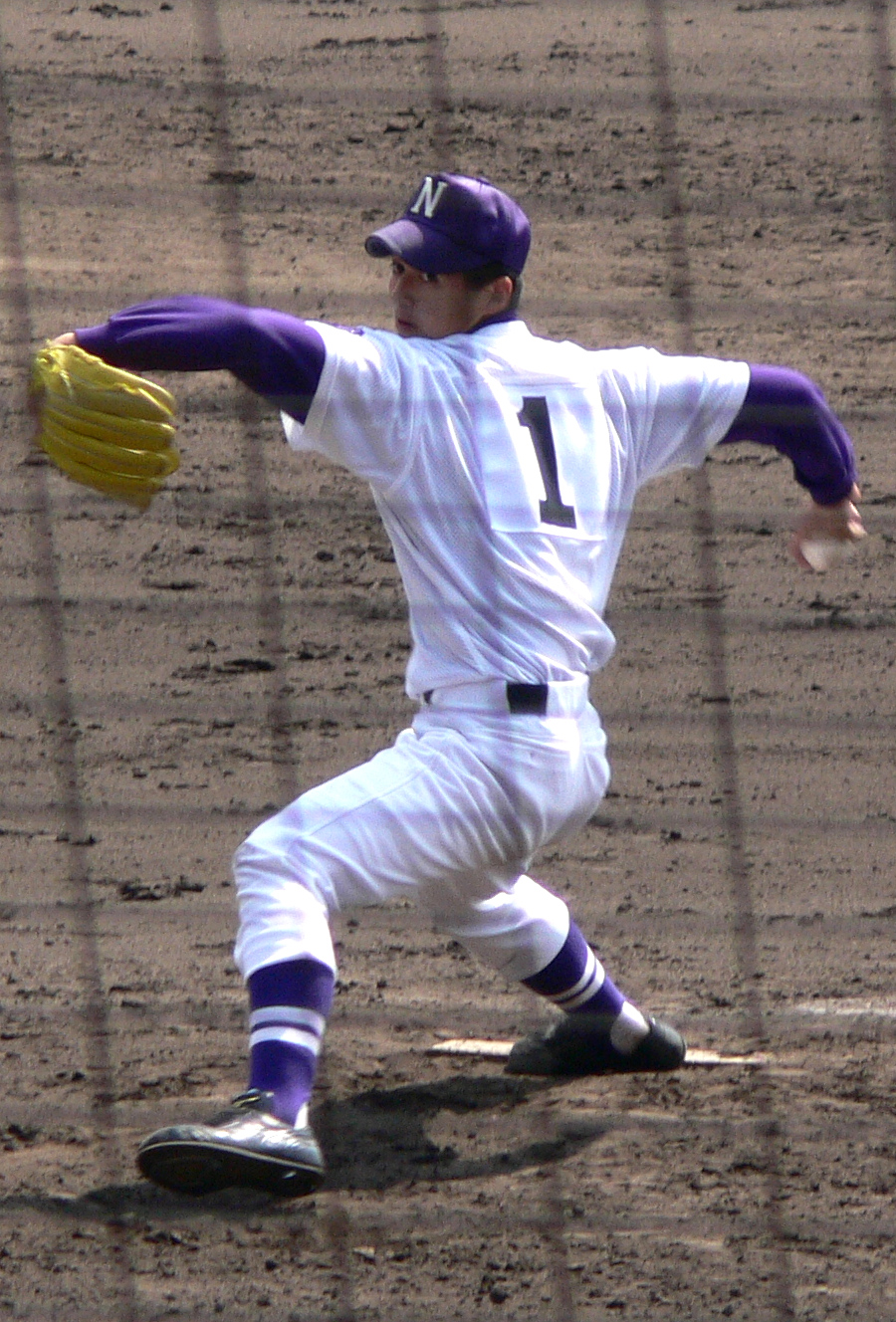
Yuki Karakawa of Narita High School pitches against Koryo High School in the 79th National High School Baseball Invitational Tournament at Koshien Stadium on March 26, 2007.

The National High School Baseball Invitational Tournament (選抜高等学校野球大会 senbatsu kōtō gakkō yakyū taikai) of Japan, commonly known as "Spring Kōshien" (春の甲子園 haru no kōshien) or "Senbatsu" (センバツ), is an annual high school baseball tournament.

== Background ==
The tournament, organized by the Japan High School Baseball Federation and Mainichi Shimbun, takes place each year in March at Hanshin Koshien Stadium in the Koshien district of Nishinomiya, Hyōgo, Japan.

Teams are chosen for the tournament by a committee from the Japan High School Baseball Federation based on a set of criteria. While it is not a guaranteed path, teams winning a regional tournament held annually in the fall are usually invited. For instance, in the 2008 Fall Tournament in the Tōhoku region, Ichinoseki Gakuin was the runner-up. However, they were passed over for 3rd place Hanamaki Higashi for the 2009 invitation tournament.

Of the 32 bids, 29 are awarded on a regional basis:

- Hokkaido - 1
- Tōhoku - 3
- Kantō - 4 or 5
- Tokyo - 1 or 2
- Tōkai - 3
- Hoku-shin'etsu - 2
- Kinki - 6
- Chūgoku - 2
- Shikoku - 2
- Kyushu including Okinawa - 4

The region of the winning team in the Meiji Jingu Fall Tournament (which consists of all fall regional champions) receives an additional bid.

The final two slots are awarded to "21st Century Teams" which are a way to give teams a chance to compete who have not gotten close to qualifying but who have served as a model school by engaging in the community or having overcome adverse circumstances such as having few players, lacking a baseball field to train on, or having been impacted by a natural disaster.

== Finals ==
(R)	Replay
*	Game went to extra innings

=== List of champions ===
List of champions
Number	Year	Champion	Runner-up	Final Score
1	1924	Takamatsu Commercial High School	Waseda Jitsugyo School	2-0
2	1925	Matsuyama Commercial High School	Takamatsu Commercial High School	3-2
3	1926	Koryo High School	Matsumoto Commercial High School	7-0
4	1927	Wakayama High School	Koryo High School	8-3
5	1928	Kwansei Gakuin High School	Wakayama High School	2-1
6	1929	Shinko Shōgyō	Koryo High School	3-1
7	1930	Shinko Shōgyō (2)	Matsuyama Shōgyō	6-1
8	1931	Hiroshima Commercial High School	Chukyo Commercial High School	2-0
9	1932	Matsuyama Commercial High School	Akashi High School	1-0
10	1933	Gifu Commercial High School	Akashi High School	1-0
11	1934	Toho Commercial High School	Naniwa Commercial High School	2x-1
12	1935	Gifu Commercial High School (2)	Koryo High School	5-4
13	1936	Aichi Commercial High School	Kiryu High School	2x-1
14	1937	Naniwa Commercial High School	Chukyo Commercial High School	2-0
15	1938	Chukyo Commercial High School	Toho Commercial High School	1-0
16	1939	Toho Commercial High School (2)	Gifu Commercial High School	7-2
17	1940	Gifu Commercial High School (3)	Kyoto Commercial High School	2-0
18	1941	Toho Commercial High School (3)	Ichinomiya High School	5-2
Canceled
19	1947	Tokushima Commercial High School	Kokura High School	3-1
20	1948	Kyoto First Commercial High School	Kyoto Second Commercial High School	1x-0
21	1949	Kitano High School	Ashiya High School	6-4
22	1950	Nirayama High School	Kochi Commercial High School	4-1
23	1951	Naruto High School	Naruo High School	3x-2
24	1952	Shizuoka Commercial High School	Naruo High School	2-0
25	1953	Sumoto High School	Naniwa Commercial High School	4-0
26	1954	Idaosahime High School	Kokura High School	1-0
27	1955	Naniwa Commercial High School	Kiryu High School	4x-3
28	1956	Chukyo Commercial High School	Gifu Commercial High School	4-0
29	1957	Waseda Jitsugyo High School	Kochi Commercial High School	5-3
30	1958	Seiseiko High School	Chukyo Commercial High School	7-1
31	1959	Chukyo Commercial High School	Gifu Commercial High School	3-2
32	1960	Takamatsu Commercial High School	Yonago Higashi High School	2x-1
33	1961	Hosei Second High School	Takamatsu Commercial High School	4-0
34	1962	Sakushin Gakuin High School	The Third High School of Nihon University	1-0
35	1963	Shimonoseki Commercial High School	Hokkai High School	10-0
36	1964	Kainan High School	Onomichi Commercial High School	3-2
37	1965	Okayama Higashi Commercial High School	Wakayama Municipal Wakayama Commercial High School	2x-1
38	1966	Chukyo Commercial High School	Tosa High School	1-0
39	1967	Tsukumi High School	Kochi High School	2-1
40	1968	Omiya Technical High School	Onomichi Commercial High School	3-2
41	1969	Mie High School	Horikoshi High School	12-0
42	1970	Minoshima High School	Hokuyo High School	5x-4
43	1971	The Third High School of Nihon University	Daitetsu High School	2-0
44	1972	Sakuragaoka High School of Nihon University	The Third High School of Nihon University	5-0
45	1973	Yokohama High School	Hiroshima Commercial High School	3-1
46	1974	Hotoku Gakuen High School	Ikeda High School	3-1
47	1975	Kochi High School	Sagami High School of Tokai University	10-5
48	1976	Sutoku High School	Oyama High School	5-0
49	1977	Minoshima High School	Nakamura High School	3-0
50	1978	Hamamatsu Commercial High School	Fukui Commercial High School	2-0
51	1979	Minoshima High School	Namisyo High School	8-7
52	1980	Kochi Commercial High School	Teikyo High School	1x-0
53	1981	PL Gakuen High School	Inba High School	2x-1
54	1982	PL Gakuen High School (2)	The High School of Nishogakusya University	15-2
55	1983	Ikeda High School	Yokohama Commercial High School	3-0
56	1984	Iwakura High School	PL Gakuen High School	1-0
57	1985	Ino Commercial High School	Teikyo High School	4-0
58	1986	Ikeda High School	Utsunomiya Minami High School	7-1
59	1987	PL Gakuen High School (3)	Kanto First High School	7-1
60	1988	Uwajima Higashi High School	Toho High School	6-0
61	1989	Toho High School (4)	Uenomiya High School	3x-2
62	1990	The High School of Kinki University	Nitta High School	5-2
63	1991	Koryo High School	Matsusyo Gakuen High School	6x-5
64	1992	Teikyo High School	Sagami High School of Tokai University	3-2
65	1993	Uenomiya High School	Omiya Higashi High School	3-0
66	1994	Chiben Gakuen Wakayama High School	Joso Gakuin High School	7-5
67	1995	Kanonji Central High School	Choshi Commercial High School	4-0
68	1996	Kagoshima Jitsugyo High School	Chiben Gakuen Wakayama High School	6-3
69	1997	Tenri High School	Chukyo High School of Chukyo University	4-1
70	1998	Yokohama High School (2)	The First High School of Kansai Universityl	3-0
71	1999	Okinawa Shogaku High School	Mito Commercial High School	7-2
72	2000	Sagami High School of Tokai University	Chiben Gakuen Wakayama High School	4-2
73	2001	Joso Gakuin High School	Sendai Ikuei High School	7-6
74	2002	Hotoku Gakuen High School	Naruto Technical High School	8-2
75	2003	Koryo High School	Yokohama High School	15-3
76	2004	Saibi High School	Meiden High School of Aichi Institute of Technology	6-5
77	2005	Meiden High School of Aichi Institute of Technology	Kamimura Gakuen High School	9-2
78	2006	Yokohama High School (3)	Seiho High School	21-0
79	2007	Tokoha Kikugawa High School	Ogaki High School of Nihon University	6-5
80	2008	Okinawa Shogaku High School	Seibo Gakuen High School	9-0
81	2009	Seiho High School	Hanamaki Higashi High School	1-0
82	2010	Konan High School	The Third High School of Nihon University	10-5
83	2011	Sagami High School of Tokai University	The High School of Kyushu International University	6-1
84	2012	Osaka Toin High School	Kosei Gakuin High School	7-3
85	2013	Urawa Gakuin High School	Saibi High School	17-1
86	2014	Heian High School of Ryukoku University	Riseisya High School	6-2
87	2015	Tsuruga Kehi High School	The fourth High School of Tokai University	3-1
88	2016	Chiben Gakuen High School	Takamatsu Commercial High School	2x-1
89	2017	Osaka Toin High School (2)	Riseisha High School	8-3
90	2018	Osaka Toin High School (3)	Chiben Gakuen Wakayama High School	5-2
91	2019	Toho High School (5)	Narashino High School	6-0
92	2020	All 32 teams played one game each in replacement Invitational Games. No tournament (pandemic)		
93	2021	Tokai University Sagami High School	Meiho High School	3-2
94	2022	Osaka Toin High School (4)	Ohmi High School	18-1
95	2023	Yamanashi Gakuin High School	Hōtoku Gakuen High School	7-3
96	2024	Takasaki High School of Takasaki University of Health and Welfare	Hōtoku Gakuen High School	3-2
97	2025	Yokohama High School (4)	Chiben Gakuen Wakayama High School	11-4
98	2026	Osaka Toin High School (5)	Chiben Gakuen High School	7-3

== See also ==
- High school baseball in Japan
- Japan High School Baseball Federation
- Japanese High School Baseball Championship ("Summer Koshien")
- Hanshin Koshien Stadium
