= List of Nippon Professional Baseball players (M) =

The following is a list of Nippon Professional Baseball players with the last name starting with M, retired or active.

== M ==
- Kevin Maas
- Takao Mabuchi
- Katsumasa Machi
- Kojiro Machida
- José Macías
- Shane Mack
- Akihiro Maeda
- Daisuke Maeda
- Hirotsugu Maeda
- Katsuhiro Maeda
- Kazuyuki Maeda
- Kenta Maeda
- Shingo Maeda
- Tadatoki Maeda
- Takashi Maeda
- Tomonori Maeda
- Yamato Maeda
- Yukinaga Maeda
- Hiroyuki Maehara
- Katsuhiko Maekawa
- Takashi Maema
- Takahiro Mahara
- Pat Mahomes
- Masaki Maki
- Akihisa Makida
- Hiromi Makihara
- Rui Makino
- Shogo Makita
- Usami Makitani
- Kenji Makuta
- Jose Malave
- Brian Mallette
- Mitsuru Manaka
- Takashi Manei
- Jeff Manto
- Barry Manuel
- Bobby Marcano
- Billy Joe Martin
- Domingo Martínez
- Luis Martinez
- Yoshihiro Maru
- Yui Maruki
- Eiji Maruo
- Taiji Maruyama
- Takashi Maruyama
- Tatsuyoshi Masubuchi
- Daisuke Masuda
- Masayuki Masuda
- Shintaro Masuda
- Natanael Mateo
- Kanichi Matoba
- Naoki Matoba
- Tetsuya Matoyama
- Nobuyasu Matsu
- Kazuya Matsuda
- Masashi Matsuda
- Nobuhiro Matsuda
- Shinji Matsuda
- Heita Matsuhira
- Hideki Matsui
- Kazuo Matsui
- Kosuke Matsui
- Takamasa Matsui
- Tatsunori Matsui
- Takahiro Matsuka
- Takahiro Matsukawa
- Kenjiro Matsuki
- Shingo Matsukubo
- Akira Matsumoto
- Kodai Matsumoto
- Naoki Matsumoto
- Shigeru Matsumoto
- Shuichiro Matsumoto
- Takaaki Matsumoto
- Takashi Matsumoto
- Takuya Matsumoto
- Tetsuya Matsumoto
- Tomofumi Matsumoto
- Yuichi Matsumoto
- Toyoji Matsumura
- Hiromi Matsunaga
- Hironori Matsunaga
- Yukio Matsunaga
- Nobuhiko Matsunaka
- Daigo Matsuoka
- Hiromu Matsuoka
- Kenichi Matsuoka
- Kenta Matsusaka
- Keita Matsushita
- Hideyuki Matsutani
- Ryujiro Matsutani
- Hiroaki Matsuura
- Hideaki Matsuyama
- Ryuhei Matsuyama
- Suguru Matsuyama
- Daisuke Matsuzaka
- Shingo Matsuzaki
- Rob Mattson
- Darrell May
- Derrick May
- Ryu Mayama
- Akinobu Mayumi
- Scott McClain
- Tim McIntosh
- Luis Main Medina
- Tetsuji Mende
- Héctor Mercado
- Orlando Merced
- Lou Merloni
- Hensley Meulens
- Bart Miadich
- Dan Miceli
- Hideyuki Mifune
- Osamu Mihara
- Shinji Mikami
- Hajime Miki
- Hitoshi Miki
- Masashi Miki
- Susumu Mikoshiba
- Bob Milacki
- Kevin Millar
- Justin Miller
- Kurt Miller
- Mark Mimbs
- Toshiyuki Mimura
- Kazuaki Minami
- Ryusuke Minami
- Ryuji Minami
- Shinichiro Minami
- Tokitaka Minamibuchi
- Masataka Minatogawa
- Nathan Minchey
- Katsuhiro Mino
- Takuya Minoda
- Damon Minor
- Carlos Mirabal
- Koichi Misawa
- Koji Mise
- Terufumi Mishima
- Bobby Mitchell
- Kevin Mitchell
- Tony Mitchell
- Yoshitaro Mitoma
- Atsuhiro Mitsuhara
- Naoki Mitsuhashi
- Koji Mitsui
- Hidekazu Mitsuyama
- Daisuke Miura
- Taka Miura
- Keiji Miwa
- Masayoshi Miwa
- Takashi Miwa
- Ryuji Miyade
- Katsuhiko Miyaji
- Kazuhiko Miyakawa
- Akira Miyakoshi
- Daisuke Miyamoto
- Hiroshi Miyamoto (baseball)
- Kazutomo Miyamoto
- Ken Miyamoto
- Kenji Miyamoto
- Shinya Miyamoto
- Rodrigo Miyamoto-Watanabe
- Naoki Miyanishi
- Hiroshi Miyauchi
- Kazuaki Miyazaki
- Michito Miyazaki
- Takeshi Miyazaki
- Futoshi Miyazato
- Daiki Mizuguchi
- Eiji Mizuguchi
- Hiroshi Mizuhara
- Shigeru Mizuhara
- Katsuhito Mizuno
- Yuki Mizuno
- Yoshitaka Mizuo
- Nobuaki Mizuochi
- Akio Mizuta
- Keisuke Mizuta
- Hidetsugu Mochizuki
- Yukinori Momiyama
- Tetsuhiro Monna
- Rich Monteleone
- Masato Monzen
- Trey Moore
- Ramón Morel
- Choji Mori
- Daisuke Mori
- Hiroyuki Mori
- Koji Mori
- Masaaki Mori
- Noriyuki Mori
- Shigeo Mori
- Shinji Mori
- Shogo Mori
- Masahiko Morifuku
- Shigeru Morikasa
- Hichori Morimoto
- Satoru Morimoto
- Katsuya Morinaga
- Masao Morinaka
- Masahiko Morino
- Hiroyuki Morioka
- Ryosuke Morioka
- Issei Morita
- Koki Morita
- Akihito Moritani
- Hiroshi Moriwaki
- Kazuto Moriyama
- Makoto Moriyama
- Ryoji Moriyama
- Kenji Morozumi
- Daisuke Motoki
- Atsuhiro Motonishi
- Kazuya Motoyanagi
- Tony Mounce
- Lyle Mouton
- Yuichiro Mukae
- Scott Mullen
- Billy Ray Munoz
- Seiichi Murakami
- Shinichi Murakami
- Shinya Murakami
- Takayuki Murakami
- Tetsuya Murakami
- Arihito Muramatsu
- Kyohei Muranaka
- Tatsuhiko Muranishi
- Tetsuyuki Muranishi
- Choji Murata
- Katsuyoshi Murata
- Kazuya Murata
- Shinichi Murata
- Shuichi Murata
- Toru Murata
- Yoshinori Murata
- Minoru Murayama
- Junichiro Mutoh
- Takashi Mutoh
- Rodney Myers
- Aaron Myette
