= Katsuki Matayoshi =

Japanese baseball player (born 1990)

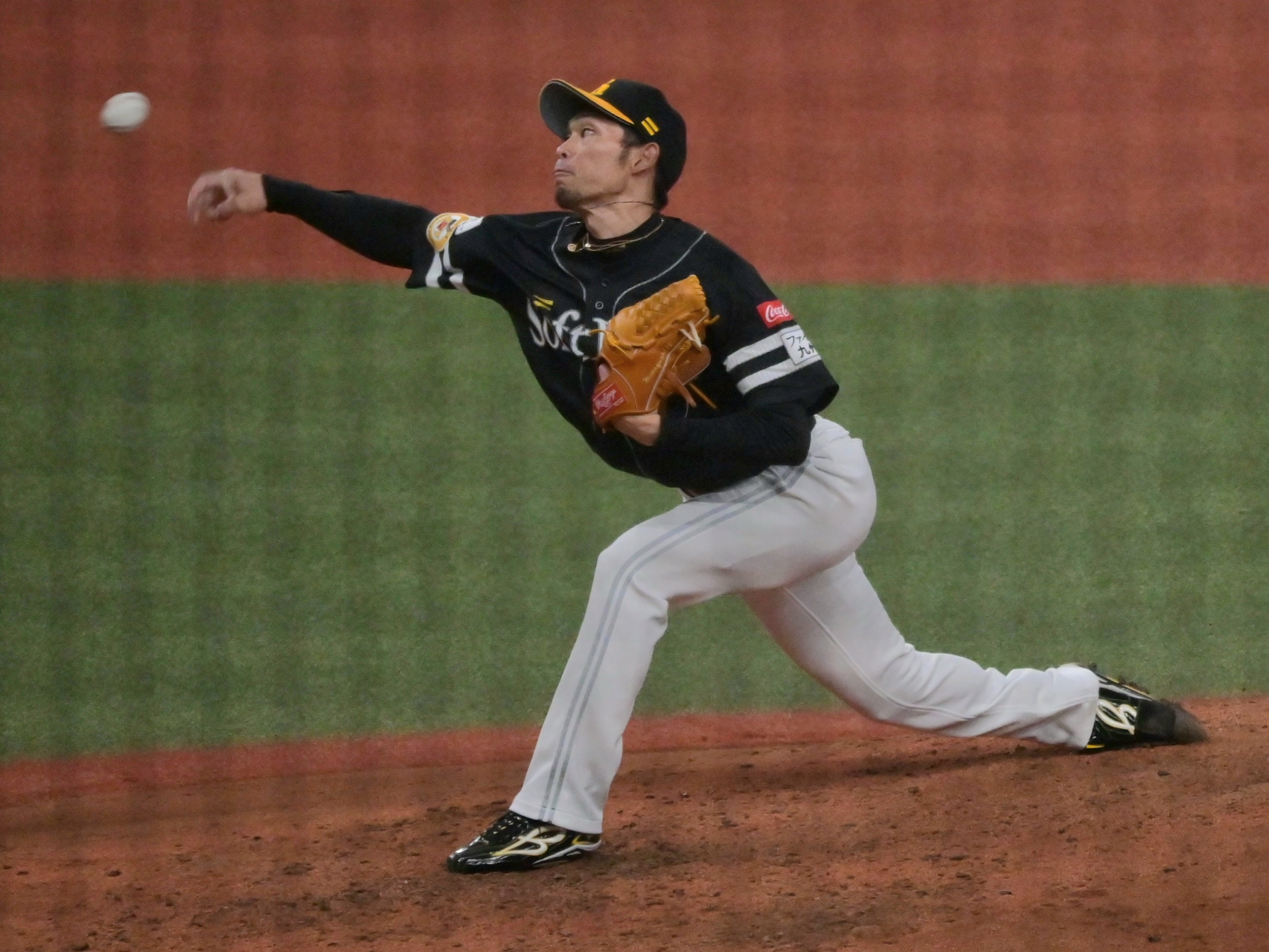
- Matayoshi with the Fukuoka SoftBank Hawks.

Leones de Yucatán
- Pitcher
- Born: November 4, 1990 (age 35); Urasoe, Okinawa, Japan
- Bats: Right Throws: Right

NPB debut
- March 29, 2014, for the Chunichi Dragons

NPB statistics (through 2024 season)
- Win–loss record: 47–32
- Earned run average: 2.84
- Strikeouts: 504
- Stats at Baseball Reference

Teams
- Kagawa Olive Guyners (2013); Chunichi Dragons (2014–2021); Fukuoka SoftBank Hawks (2022–2025)

Career highlights and awards
- 3× NPB All-Star (2017, 2021, 2022); Japan Series champion (2025)
Medals
Men's baseball
Representing Japan
Asia Professional Baseball Championship
Gold medal – first place	2017 Tokyo	Team

Katsuki Matayoshi (又吉 克樹, Matayoshi Katsuki; born November 4, 1990) is a Japanese professional baseball pitcher for the Leones de Yucatán of the Mexican League. He has previously played in Nippon Professional Baseball (NPB) for the Chunichi Dragons and Fukuoka SoftBank Hawks.

== Professional career ==
=== Kagawa Olive Guyners ===
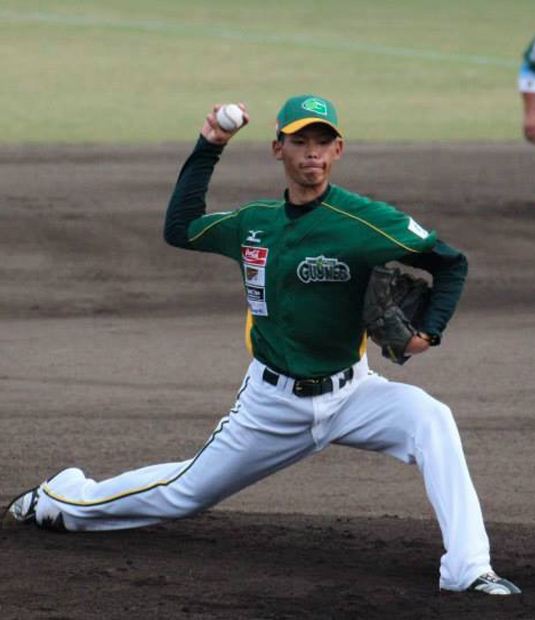
Matayoshi with the Kagawa Olive Guyners.

On December 13, 2012, Matayoshi signed with the Kagawa Olive Guyners of the independent league Shikoku Island League Plus.

On June 22, 2013, His shutout win against the Kochi Fighting Dogs caught the attention of the Chunichi Dragons scouts. In 2013 season, he finished the regular season with 24 Games pitched, a 13–4 Win–loss record, a 1.64 ERA, and a 101 strikeouts in 131.1 innings.

=== Chunichi Dragons ===
On October 24, 2013, Matayoshi was drafted by the Chunichi Dragons in the 2013 Nippon Professional Baseball draft.

==== 2014–2015 season ====
On March 29, 2014, Matayoshi debuted in the Central League against the Hiroshima Toyo Carp as a relief pitcher, and recorded Holds. On April 17, he pitched against the Yokohama DeNA BayStars and recorded his first win. In 2014 season, he finished the regular season with 67 Games pitched, a 9–1 Win–loss record, a 2.21 ERA, a 24 Holds, a 2 Saves, and a 104 strikeouts in 81.1 innings.

In 2015 season, Matayoshi finished the regular season with 63 games pitched, a 6–6 win–loss record, a 3.36 ERA, 30 Holds, and 82 strikeouts in 72.1 innings.

==== 2016–2021 season ====
In 2016 season, Matayoshi broke the team record of pitching in at least 60 games for three consecutive seasons as a setup man. And he recorded a 62 Games pitched, a 6–6 Win–loss record, a 2.80 ERA, a 16 Holds, and a 55 strikeouts in 54.2 innings.

On April 27, 2017, he scored his first win as a starting pitcher against the Tokyo Yakult Swallows. On July 4, Matayoshi was the first pitcher from an independent league to be named an My navi All-Star Game 2017. In 2017 season, he finished the regular season with 50 Games pitched, an 8–3 Win–loss record, a 2.13 ERA, a 21 Holds, and a 78 strikeouts in 110 innings.

On August 9, 2018, he achieved his 100th career Holds against the Hiroshima Toyo Carp. In 2018 season, he finished the regular season with 40 Games pitched, a 2–5 Win–loss record, a 6.53 ERA, a 9 Holds, and a 28 strikeouts in 41.1 innings.

In 2019 season, Matayoshi finished the regular season with 26 Games pitched, a 3–3 Win–loss record, a 4.06 ERA, a 3 Holds, and a 37 strikeouts in 44.1 innings.

On June 27, 2020, Matayoshi was diagnosed with a left oblique muscle injury and recuperated. He returned to the mound on September 1 after two months of rehabilitation. In 2020 season, he finished the regular season with 26 Games pitched, a 4–0 Win–loss record, a 2.77 ERA, a 7 Holds, and a 18 strikeouts in 26 innings.

On July 16, 2021, Matayoshi was named an All-Star for the second time and pitched in My Navi All-Star Game 2021. In 2021 season, he had a career-high 33 holds in 66 games and recorded a 1.28 ERA, 8 Saves, and 41 strikeouts in 63.1 innings.

On November 29, he announced that he would exercise his free agent rights(ja:フリーエージェント (日本プロ野球)).

=== Fukuoka SoftBank Hawks ===
On December 14, 2021, the Fukuoka SoftBank Hawks announced that they had signed Matayoshi to a four-year contract. His annual salary, including incentives, was estimated at 650 million yen in total for four years.

==== 2022 season–2025 season ====
On March 26, 2022, Matayoshi made his first start as a pitcher for the Hawks. On April 26, he became the ninth player in NPB history to reach 150 holds against the Saitama Seibu Lions. After that, he contributed to the team as a setup man, but on August 9, he was diagnosed with a broken right leg and spent the rest of the season in rehabilitation. For the 2022 season, in 31 games pitched, he logged a 3–3 record, a 2.10 ERA, 14 holds, one save, and 22 strikeouts in 30 innings.

Returning for the 2023 season, Matayoshi posted a 2–2 record with a 2.25 ERA, 10 holds, and 15 strikeouts over 28 innings.

In 2024, Matayoshi's numbers began to slightly decline, as he registered a 1–1 record with a 3.54 ERA, 6 holds, 24 strikeouts, and 10 walks across 40 2/3 innings.

In 2025, Matayoshi did not make the top team and spent the entire season on the second team (farm) roster. During this time, he also transitioned from a relief pitcher to a starter. He posted a 3.58 ERA with just 47 strikeouts over 75 1/3 innings, including 12 starts. Following the season, Matayoshi's contract expired and the team informed him that they would not be re-signing him, thus becoming a free agent.

=== Leones de Yucatán ===
On February 16, 2026, Matayoshi signed with the Leones de Yucatán of the Mexican League.

== International career ==
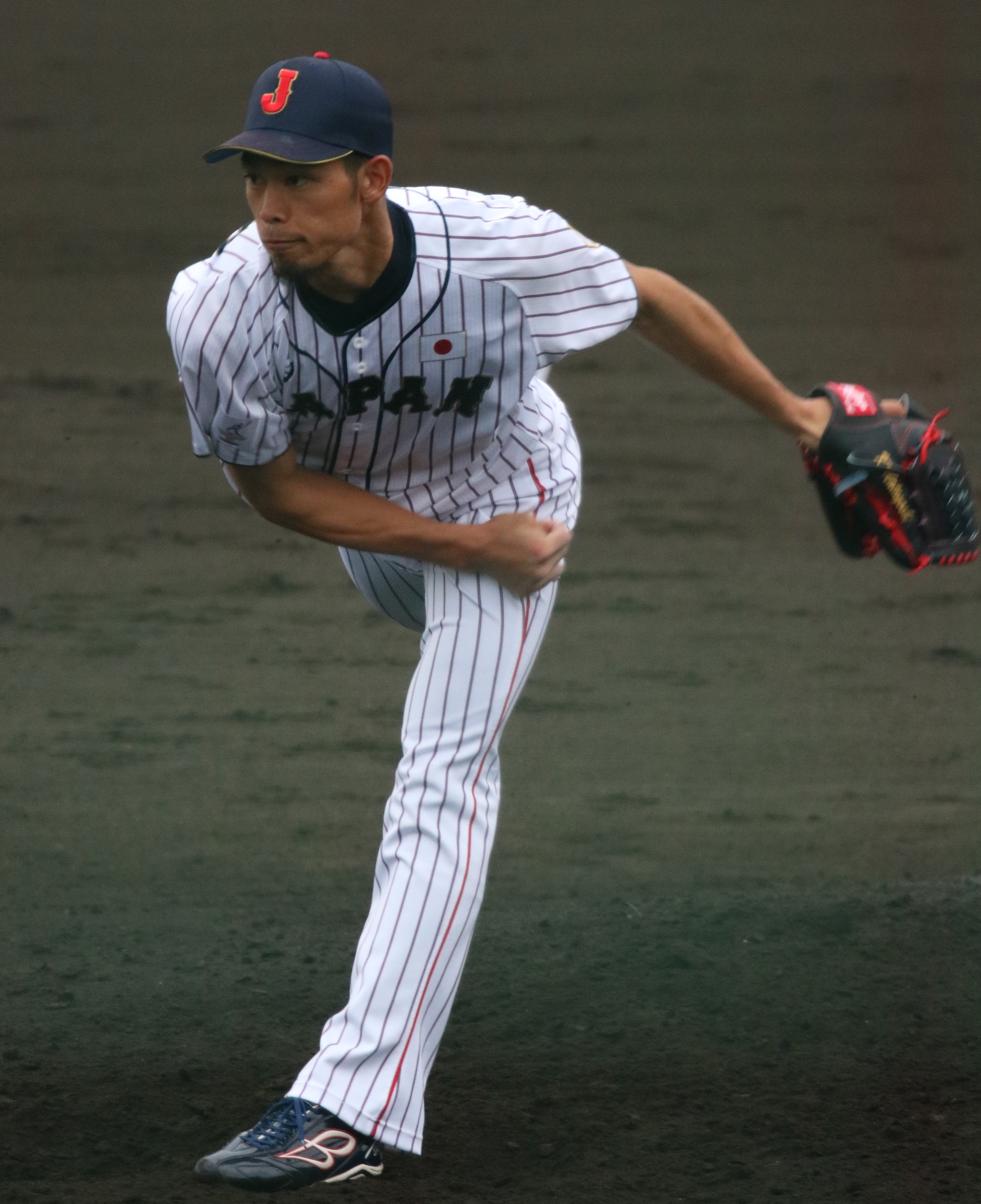
Matayoshi with the Japan national baseball team in 2017.

On February 16, 2015, Matayoshi represented the Japan national baseball team at the GLOBAL BASEBALL MATCH 2015.

On October 12, 2017, he was selected as the Japan national baseball team in the 2017 Asia Professional Baseball Championship.
