= 1988 Japan Series =

Team (Wins)	Managers	Season
Seibu Lions (4)	Masaaki Mori	73–51–6, .589, GA: 0
Chunichi Dragons (1)	Senichi Hoshino	79–46–5, .632, GA: 12
- Dates: October 22–27
- MVP: Hiromichi Ishige (SEI)
- FSA: Masaru Uno (CHU)

Broadcast
- Television: THK (Game 1), CBC (Game 2), TBS (Games 3-4), NHK General TV (Game 4), TV Asahi (Game 5)
- Radio: NHK Radio 1, TBS (JRN), JOQR (NRN), NBS (NRN), Radio Nippon

The 1988 Japan Series was the championship series of Nippon Professional Baseball (NPB) for the 1988 season. The 39th edition of the Series, it was a best-of-seven playoff that matched the Central League champion Chunichi Dragons against the Pacific League champion Seibu Lions. Chunichi won the Central League pennant by a comfortable 12 games to advance to the championship. However, the representative from the Pacific League was undecided up until three days before Game 1 of the Japan Series. Seibu fought neck-and-neck for first place with the Kintetsu Buffaloes over most of the season and finished their regular-season schedule with a 0.5-game advantage over Kintetsu, with Kintetsu having four games left to play. On the last day of the season (October 19), Kintetsu had to win both games of an away double-header against the last-place Lotte Orions to claim the PL pennant. Kintetsu won the first game by one run (by scoring one run in the top of the ninth inning), but Lotte forced a comeback tie in the second game, capping a dramatic finish to the season (known to Japanese baseball fans as "10.19") and giving Seibu the PL spot in the Japan Series for the fourth year in a row.

Played at Nagoya Stadium and Seibu Dome, the Lions won the series four games to one, winning the final game on a walk-off base hit by catcher Tsutomu Ito. The 1988 contest was the third in Japan Series history to end on a walk-off (after 1950 and 1965). Seibu shortstop Hiromichi Ishige was named Most Valuable Player of the series. The series was played between October 22 and October 27 with home field advantage going to the Central League.

== Summary ==
PL Seibu Lions (4) vs. CL Chunichi Dragons (1)

Game	Date	Score	Location	Time	Attendance
1	October 22	Seibu Lions – 5, Chunichi Dragons – 1	Nagoya Stadium	3:03	28,963
2	October 23	Seibu Lions – 3, Chunichi Dragons – 7	Nagoya Stadium	2:39	28,953
3	October 25	Chunichi Dragons – 3, Seibu Lions – 4	Seibu Dome	2:30	32,081
4	October 26	Chunichi Dragons – 0, Seibu Lions – 6	Seibu Dome	2:44	32,261
5	October 27	Chunichi Dragons – 6, Seibu Lions – 7	Seibu Dome	4:09	32,304

== Matchups ==
=== Game 1 ===
Saturday, October 22, 1988 at Nagoya Stadium, Nagoya, Gifu
Team	1	2	3	4	5	6	7	8	9	R	H	E
Seibu	0	2	1	0	0	1	0	0	1	5	9	0
Chunichi	0	0	0	0	0	1	0	0	0	1	7	1
WP: Hisanobu Watanabe (1–0) LP: Kazuyuki Ono (0–1) Sv: Osamu Higashio (1); Home runs: SEI: None; CHU: Kazuhiro Kiyohara (1), Hiromichi Ishige (1)

=== Game 2 ===
Sunday, October 23, 1988 at Nagoya Stadium, Nagoya, Gifu
Team	1	2	3	4	5	6	7	8	9	R	H	E
Seibu	0	0	0	0	3	0	0	0	0	3	8	0
Chunichi	0	1	2	0	0	0	0	4	X	7	9	0
WP: Genji Kaku (1–0) LP: Tai-Yuan Kuo (0–1); Home runs: SEI: None; CHU: Yonetoshi Kawamata (1)

=== Game 3 ===
Tuesday, October 25, 1988 at Seibu Dome, Tokorozawa, Saitama
Team	1	2	3	4	5	6	7	8	9	R	H	E
Chunichi	1	0	0	0	0	0	2	0	0	3	4	2
Seibu	0	0	0	0	1	3	0	0	X	4	3	0
WP: Kimiyasu Kudoh (1–0) LP: Masahiro Yamamoto (0–1); Home runs: CHU: Toshikatsu Hikono (1), Masaru Uno (1); SEI: Hiromichi Ishige (2)

=== Game 4 ===
Wednesday, October 26, 1988 at Seibu Dome, Tokorozawa, Saitama
Team	1	2	3	4	5	6	7	8	9	R	H	E
Chunichi	0	0	0	0	0	0	0	0	0	0	2	1
Seibu	0	0	2	1	2	0	1	0	X	6	8	0
WP: Ryoji Moriyama (1–0) LP: Tadashi Sugimoto (0–1); Home runs: CHU: None; SEI: Koji Akiyama (1), Kazuhiro Kiyohara (2), Hatsuhiko Tsuji (1)

=== Game 5 ===
Thursday, October 27, 1988 at Seibu Dome, Tokorozawa, Saitama
Team	1	2	3	4	5	6	7	8	9	10	11	R	H	E
Chunichi	1	1	2	0	0	2	0	0	0	0	0	6	8	0
Seibu	3	0	0	0	1	1	0	0	1	0	1	7	11	2
WP: Hirohisa Matsunuma (1-0) LP: Genji Kaku (1–1); Home runs: CHU: Masaru Uno (2); SEI: Kazuhiro Kiyohara (3), Hiromichi Ishige (3)

== See also ==
- 1988 World Series
