= Fukuoka (disambiguation) =

Fukuoka is the capital city of Fukuoka Prefecture.

Fukuoka may also refer to:

== Places ==
- Fukuoka, Gifu, a town in Gifu Prefecture, Japan
- Fukuoka, Toyama, a town in Toyama Prefecture, Japan
- Fukuoka 17, a World War II-era Japanese POW camp at the Mitsui Kozan Miike Kogyo-Sho coal mine and Mitsui Zinc Foundry in Shinminato, Omuta, Fukuoka Prefecture, Japan
- Fukuoka Domain, a Japanese domain of the Edo period, located in Hizen Province (in modern-day Fukuoka Prefecture)
- Fukuoka Prefecture, one of the 47 prefectures in Japan
- Fukuoka–Kitakyushu, a metropolitan area encompassing the cities of Fukuoka and Kitakyushu in Fukuoka Prefecture, Japan

== Sports ==
- Avispa Fukuoka, a Japanese professional football (soccer) club in Hakata, Fukuoka Prefecture, Japan
- Fukuoka Marathon, an international marathon race established in 1947 held in Fukuoka, Japan
- Fukuoka Red Warblers, a semi-professional baseball team in the Shikoku-Kyūshū Island League of Japan
- Fukuoka Sanix Blues, a Japanese rugby union team based in Munakata, Fukuoka Prefecture, Japan
- Fukuoka SoftBank Hawks, a Japanese baseball team based in Fukuoka, Japan

== Transportation ==
- Fukuoka Airport, an international airport in Fukuoka, Japan
- Fukuoka Station, a train station in Takaoka, Toyama Prefecture, Japan

== Other uses ==
- Fukuoka (surname)
- Fukuoka clan, the feudal clan who ruled Chikuzen Province
- Fukuoka (film), a 2019 film by Zhang Lü
- 8159 Fukuoka, a Main-belt Asteroid discovered in 1990
