= Kohichi Amano =

Japanese baseball player

- Pitcher
- Born: April 12, 1979 (age 47); Kagawa, Japan
- Batted: Right Threw: Right

NPB debut
- August 7, 2002, for the Hiroshima Toyo Carp

Last NPB appearance
- September 10, 2005, for the Hiroshima Toyo Carp

Teams
- Hiroshima Toyo Carp (2002 – 2005); Kagawa Olive Guyners (2007); Fukui Miracle Elephants (2008)

Kohichi Amano (天野 浩一, Amano Kōichi; born April 12, 1979) is a professional Japanese baseball player playing who has played for the Hiroshima Toyo Carp in Nippon Professional Baseball. After his short stint in NPB, he went on to play in the Shikoku Island League and the Baseball Challenge League.
