= Alex Maestri =

Italian baseball player

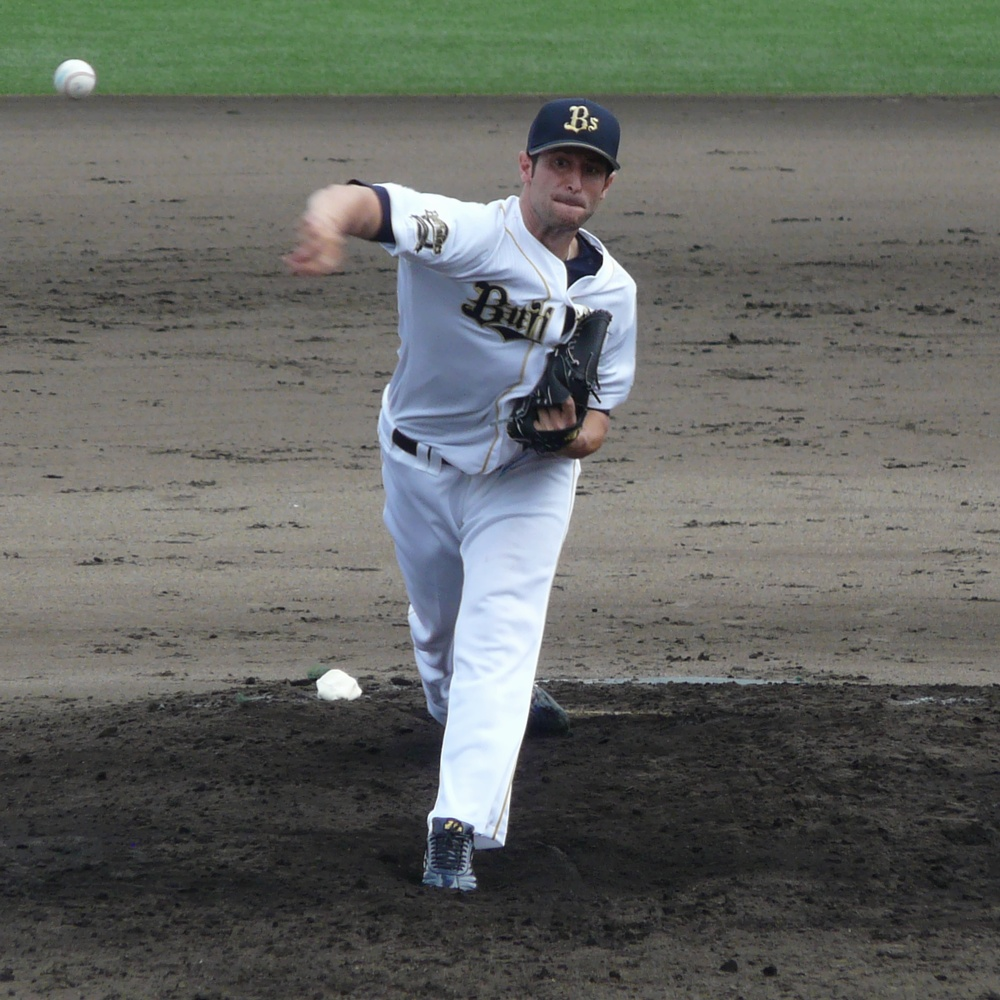
- Maestri with the Orix Buffaloes
- Pitcher
- Born: June 1, 1985 (age 41); Cesena, Italy
- Batted: Right Threw: Right

Professional debut
- NPB: August 12, 2012, for the Orix Buffaloes
- KBO: April 5, 2016, for the Hanwha Eagles

Last appearance
- NPB: September 30, 2015, for the Orix Buffaloes
- KBO: June 17, 2016, for the Hanwha Eagles

NPB statistics
- Win–loss record: 14–11
- Earned run average: 3.44
- Strikeouts: 164

KBO statistics
- Win–loss record: 2–2
- Earned run average: 9.42
- Strikeouts: 23
- Stats at Baseball Reference

Teams
- Orix Buffaloes (2012–2015); Hanwha Eagles (2016)

Career highlights and awards
- Australian Baseball League All-Star (2011); ABL Fan Choice Award (2012)
Medals
Men's baseball
Coach for Italy
European Championship
Silver medal – second place	2025 Rotterdam	Team

Alessandro Maestri (born June 1, 1985, in Cesena, Italy) is an Italian former professional baseball player. He played in Nippon Professional Baseball (NPB) for the Orix Buffaloes and in the KBO League for the Hanwha Eagles.

A pitcher, the 5 ft 11 in (1.80 m), 180 lb (82 kg) right-hander signed with the Chicago Cubs as a non-drafted free agent on January 6, 2006. He played for Team Italy in the 2019 European Baseball Championship.

== Career ==
=== Early career ===
Born in Cesena, Maestri grew up in Viserba, a suburb near Rimini. He played in the Italian minor leagues for Torre Pedrera. In 2005, he joined the San Marino Baseball Club of the Italian Baseball League, the highest league in Italy.

=== Chicago Cubs organization ===
Early in the 2007 season, Maestri's second season of professional ball with the Class A Peoria Chiefs, he gave up seven runs in two innings against the Cedar Rapids Kernels. From that point on, he did not give up more than two runs in an appearance for the rest of the season, and converted his first seven save opportunities to earn himself a Midwest League All-Star nod.

His success in 2007 prompted the Cubs to try to convert Maestri into a starter. Thus, he began the 2008 season in the starting rotation of the Florida State League Class A advanced Daytona Cubs. In this role, he went 5-3 with a 3.69 ERA to again earn himself an All Star nod. Following the all star game, Maestri was promoted to the double A Southern League Tennessee Smokies. With the Smokies, Maestri made two starts in which he pitched 11 innings and gave up eight earned runs before shoulder soreness forced the Cubs to shut him down for the remainder of the season, and ended the Cubs' experiment with Maestri as a starter.

The Cubs released Maestri in April 2011, and he signed with the Lincoln Saltdogs of the American Association of Independent Professional Baseball.

=== Brisbane Bandits ===
On November 5, 2011, Maestri made his Australian Baseball League debut with the Brisbane Bandits. Starting against the Canberra Cavalry, Maestri went five innings and gave up two hits, picking up the first win of the Bandits' 2011–12 season. His performances earned him a spot with Team World at the 2011 Australian Baseball League All-Star Game. Maestri pitched a scoreless inning in the game. Maestri continued the season as the Bandits' ace, finishing third highest in the league in strikeouts and innings pitched. The Bandits ended the half a game short of the playoffs, with Maestri posting a 3.25 ERA and a 1.16 WHIP en route to winning the ABL's Fan Choice Award.

=== Rimini Baseball Club and the Kagawa Olive Guyners ===
Maestri played portions of 2012 for the Rimini Baseball Club and the Kagawa Olive Guyners of Japan's Shikoku Island League.

=== Orix Buffaloes ===
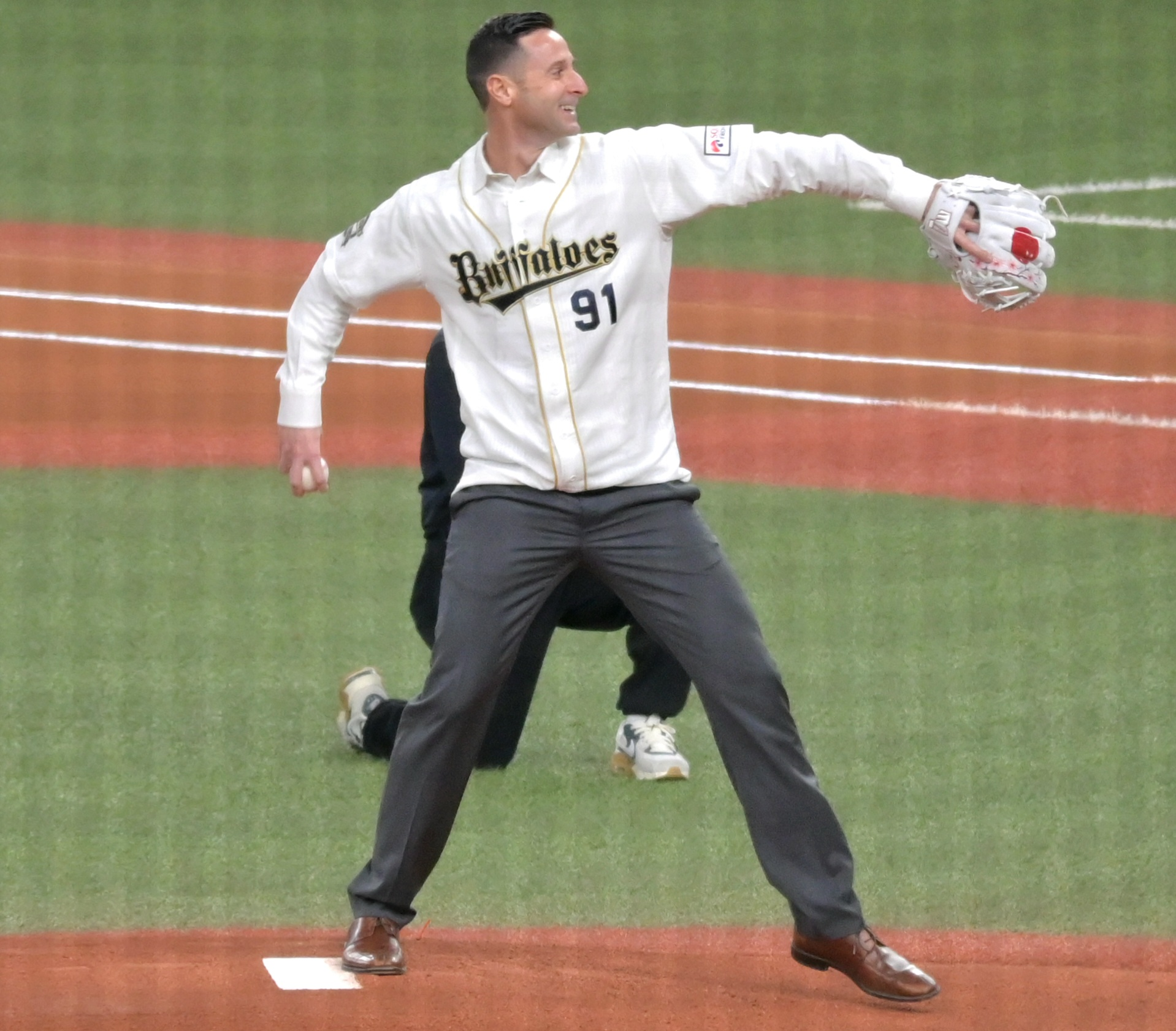
Maestri throwing the ceremonial first pitch before an Orix preseason game in 2024.

Maestri signed with the Orix Buffaloes of Nippon Professional Baseball prior to the 2012 season. In his first season with Orix, Maestri recorded a 4–3 record and 2.17 ERA with 40 strikeouts. In 2013, Maestri pitched to a 7–5 record and 5.40 ERA in 24 games. In 36 games in 2014, Maestri registered a 3–1 record and stellar 1.97 ERA with 48 strikeouts. In his final season with Orix, Maestri recorded an 0–2 record and 3.19 ERA in 28 games.

On November 9, 2015, Maestri elected free agency.

=== Hanwha Eagles ===
In 2016, Maestri moved to the Hanwha Eagles of the KBO League. He was released on June 25, 2016, to make way for new signing Fabio Castillo. He had recorded a 9.42 ERA in nine games for the Eagles.

=== Gunma Diamond Pegasus ===
On July 12, 2016, after being released from his Korean team, Maestri returned to the independent leagues of Japan by signing for Gunma Diamond Pegasus of the Baseball Challenge League.

=== Rojos del Águila de Veracruz ===
On April 10, 2017, Maestri signed with the Rojos del Águila de Veracruz of the Mexican Baseball League.

=== Return to San Marino ===
On December 21, 2017, Maestri signed with the T&A San Marino of the Italian Baseball League. He played with the club through the 2020 season.

=== Sydney Blue Sox ===
Maestri signed with the Sydney Blue Sox of the Australian Baseball League for the 2018-19 season.

On May 11, 2021, Maestri announced his retirement from professional baseball.

== International career ==
=== Italy national team ===
Maestri was signed by Cubs scout Bill Holmberg, who also served as pitching coach for the Italy national baseball team for whom Maestri pitched in both the 2006 and 2009 World Baseball Classic. Maestri gave up one earned run in two appearances out of the bullpen in the 2006 WBC. In 2009, Maestri pitched 2.2 innings without giving up a run. He also pitched for Team Italy in the 2019 European Baseball Championship. He played for the team at the Africa/Europe 2020 Olympic Qualification tournament, which took place in Italy beginning September 18, 2019.
