= Big N =

Big N may refer to:

- DJ Big N
- Nagasaki Baseball Stadium
- Neisner's
- Nickname for Nintendo

== See also ==
- Big N' Tasty
