= 1988 Nippon Professional Baseball season =

1988 NPB season
- League: Nippon Professional Baseball
- Sport: Baseball

Regular season
- Season MVP: CL: Genji Kaku (CHU); PL: Hiromitsu Kadota (NAN)

League postseason
- CL champions: Chunichi Dragons
- CL runners-up: Yomiuri Giants
- PL champions: Seibu Lions
- PL runners-up: Kintetsu Buffaloes

Japan Series
- Champions: Seibu Lions
- Runners-up: Chunichi Dragons
- Finals MVP: Hiromichi Ishige (SEI)

NPB seasons
- ← 1987 1989 →

The 1988 Nippon Professional Baseball season was the 39th season of operation for the league.

== Regular season standings ==
=== Central League ===
Central League	G	W	L	T	Pct.	GB
Chunichi Dragons	130	79	46	5	.632	--
Yomiuri Giants	130	68	59	3	.535	12.0
Hiroshima Toyo Carp	130	65	62	3	.512	15.0
Yokohama Taiyo Whales	130	59	67	4	.468	20.5
Yakult Swallows	130	58	69	3	.457	22.0
Hanshin Tigers	130	51	77	2	.398	29.5

=== Pacific League ===
Pacific League	G	W	L	T	Pct.	GB
Seibu Lions	130	73	51	6	.589	--
Kintetsu Buffaloes	130	74	52	4	.587	0.0
Nippon-Ham Fighters	130	62	65	3	.488	12.5
Hankyu Braves	130	60	68	2	.469	15.0
Nankai Hawks	130	58	71	1	.450	17.5
Lotte Orions	130	54	74	2	.422	21.0

== Japan Series ==
PL Seibu Lions (4) vs. CL Chunichi Dragons (1)

Game	Date	Score	Location	Time	Attendance
1	October 22	Seibu Lions – 5, Chunichi Dragons – 1	Nagoya Stadium	3:03	28,963
2	October 23	Seibu Lions – 3, Chunichi Dragons – 7	Nagoya Stadium	2:39	28,953
3	October 25	Chunichi Dragons – 3, Seibu Lions – 4	Seibu Dome	2:30	32,081
4	October 26	Chunichi Dragons – 0, Seibu Lions – 6	Seibu Dome	2:44	32,261
5	October 27	Chunichi Dragons – 6, Seibu Lions – 7	Seibu Dome	4:09	32,304

== See also ==
- 1988 Major League Baseball season
