= Lars Anderson (baseball) =

American baseball player (born 1987)

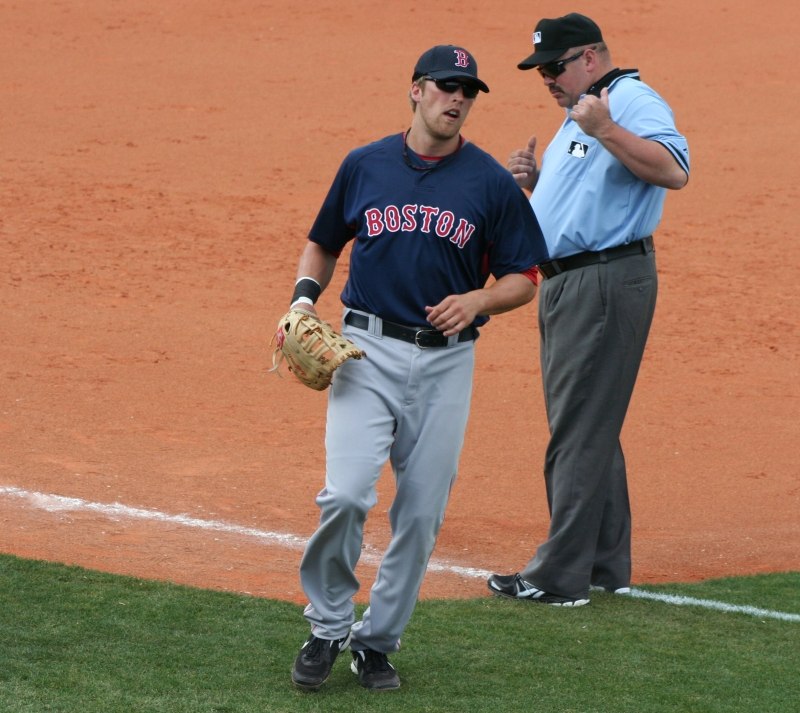
- Anderson in 2010 with the Red Sox
- First baseman
- Born: September 25, 1987 (age 38); Oakland, California, U.S.
- Batted: Left Threw: Left

MLB debut
- September 6, 2010, for the Boston Red Sox

Last MLB appearance
- May 1, 2012, for the Boston Red Sox

MLB statistics
- Batting average: .167
- Home runs: 0
- Runs batted in: 4
- Stats at Baseball Reference

Teams
- Boston Red Sox (2010–2012)

Lars Eric Anderson (born September 25, 1987) is an American former professional baseball first baseman. He played in Major League Baseball (MLB) for the Boston Red Sox from 2010 through 2012.

== High school ==
Anderson attended Jesuit High School in Sacramento, California. In his senior season he hit over .400 with 14 home runs in 29 games. He committed to attend the University of California, Berkeley on a scholarship to play college baseball for the California Golden Bears baseball team.

== Professional career ==
=== Boston Red Sox ===
Coming into the 2006 Major League Baseball draft, Anderson was considered an early round talent, but dropped to the 18th round due to signability issues. He agreed to an $825,000 signing bonus with the Boston Red Sox, equivalent to the suggested bonus for a first round supplemental pick.

He made his professional debut in April 2007 with the Greenville Drive. "He really understands the strike zone well, and he recognizes balls and strikes early," said Gabe Kapler, the former Sox outfielder who was Anderson's manager at Greenville. "He was way ahead of the game because he was already recognizing balls and strikes and had a plan, an approach at the plate that was advanced. He had planned on not swinging at breaking balls until he had two strikes on him."

In September 2008, Anderson was named the Minor League Offensive Player of the Year for the Red Sox, following a season of a combined 18 home runs and 80 runs batted in while hitting over .300 for both the Lancaster JetHawks and Portland Sea Dogs.

In 2009, his first full season at Double–A Portland, Anderson struggled, batting just .233 with 9 home runs and 51 RBI.

Anderson started the 2010 season with the Sea Dogs. He was promoted to the Triple–A Pawtucket Red Sox on April 29 after hitting .355 with five home runs and 15 RBI in 17 games in Portland, and batted .262 with 10 home runs and 53 RBI in 113 games.

Despite making his major league debut in September 2010, Anderson returned to Pawtucket for the 2011 season and batted .265 with 14 home runs and 78 RBI. On July 30, 2011, Anderson was nearly traded to his hometown Oakland Athletics, along with a player to be named later for starting pitcher Rich Harden. However, the deal fell through, with the Red Sox citing issues with Harden's health.

Anderson made his major league debut with Red Sox on September 6, 2010. He then replaced Mike Lowell at first base in the 5th inning of Lowell's last major league game on October 2, 2010, designated "Mike Lowell Day" by the Red Sox. In 18 appearances Anderson had 7 hits in 35 at-bats, with 4 RBI.

Anderson appeared in 6 games in September 2011 as a defensive replacement and pinch runner, scoring twice as a pinch runner.

On April 23, 2012, Anderson was again called up to the majors after Jason Repko was placed on the 15-day disabled list.

=== Cleveland Indians ===
The Red Sox traded Anderson to the Cleveland Indians in exchange for Steven Wright on July 31, 2012. In 18 games for the Triple–A Columbus Clippers, he batted .196/.319/.286 with no home runs and seven RBI.

=== Chicago White Sox ===
On December 11, 2012, the Indians traded Anderson to the Arizona Diamondbacks in a three-team trade. Anderson was designated for assignment by the Diamondbacks on January 24, 2013.

On February 1, 2013, Anderson was claimed off waivers by the Chicago White Sox. After being designated for assignment by the White Sox, Anderson was claimed by the Toronto Blue Jays on February 25. Anderson was designated for assignment by the Blue Jays on March 29. After clearing waivers, Anderson was traded back to the White Sox in exchange for cash on April 1. Anderson was subsequently assigned to the White Sox's Triple–A affiliate, the Charlotte Knights to begin the season. On July 18, Anderson was released by the organization.

=== Chicago Cubs ===
On January 24, 2014, Anderson signed a minor league contract with the Chicago Cubs. In 71 games split between the Double–A Tennessee Smokies and Triple–A Iowa Cubs, he slashed a combined .303/.382/.474 with six home runs and 31 RBI.

=== Los Angeles Dodgers ===
On December 17, 2014, Anderson signed a minor league contract with the Los Angeles Dodgers and was assigned to the Double–A Tulsa Drillers to start the season. He appeared in 130 games for the Drillers and also three games for the Triple–A Oklahoma City Dodgers. He hit .242 with 14 homers and 65 RBI. In 2016, he appeared in 8 games for Oklahoma City and 88 games for Tulsa, and hit .266 with 8 homers and 48 RBI. Anderson elected free agency following the season on November 7, 2016.

=== Kōchi Fighting Dogs ===
In March 2017, Anderson joined the Kōchi Fighting Dogs of the Shikoku Island League Plus independent league.

=== Sydney Blue Sox ===
Anderson signed with the Sydney Blue Sox of the Australian Baseball League for the 2017/18 season.

=== Solingen Alligators ===
In March 2018, Anderson signed with the Solingen Alligators of the Baseball Bundesliga, Germany's premier baseball league. He became a free agent following the season, and later retired in the offseason.

== Personal life ==
Anderson is a co-owner of Birdman Bats along with former Red Sox teammate Ryan Kalish. Anderson has been an owner of Birdman Bats since 2016.
