= Ehime Mandarin Pirates =

Japanese professional baseball team

Logo and Character

The Ehime Mandarin Pirates (愛媛マンダリンパイレーツ, Ehime Mandarin Pairētsu) are a professional baseball team in the Shikoku Island League Plus of Japan. Established in 2005, the Mandarin Pirates mainly play their home games at Botchan Stadium in Matsuyama, the capital city of Ehime Prefecture.

They won the 2015 and 2016 season titles by beating other teams in the Island League playoff.
