= Kazuhiro Kiyohara =

Japanese former baseball player

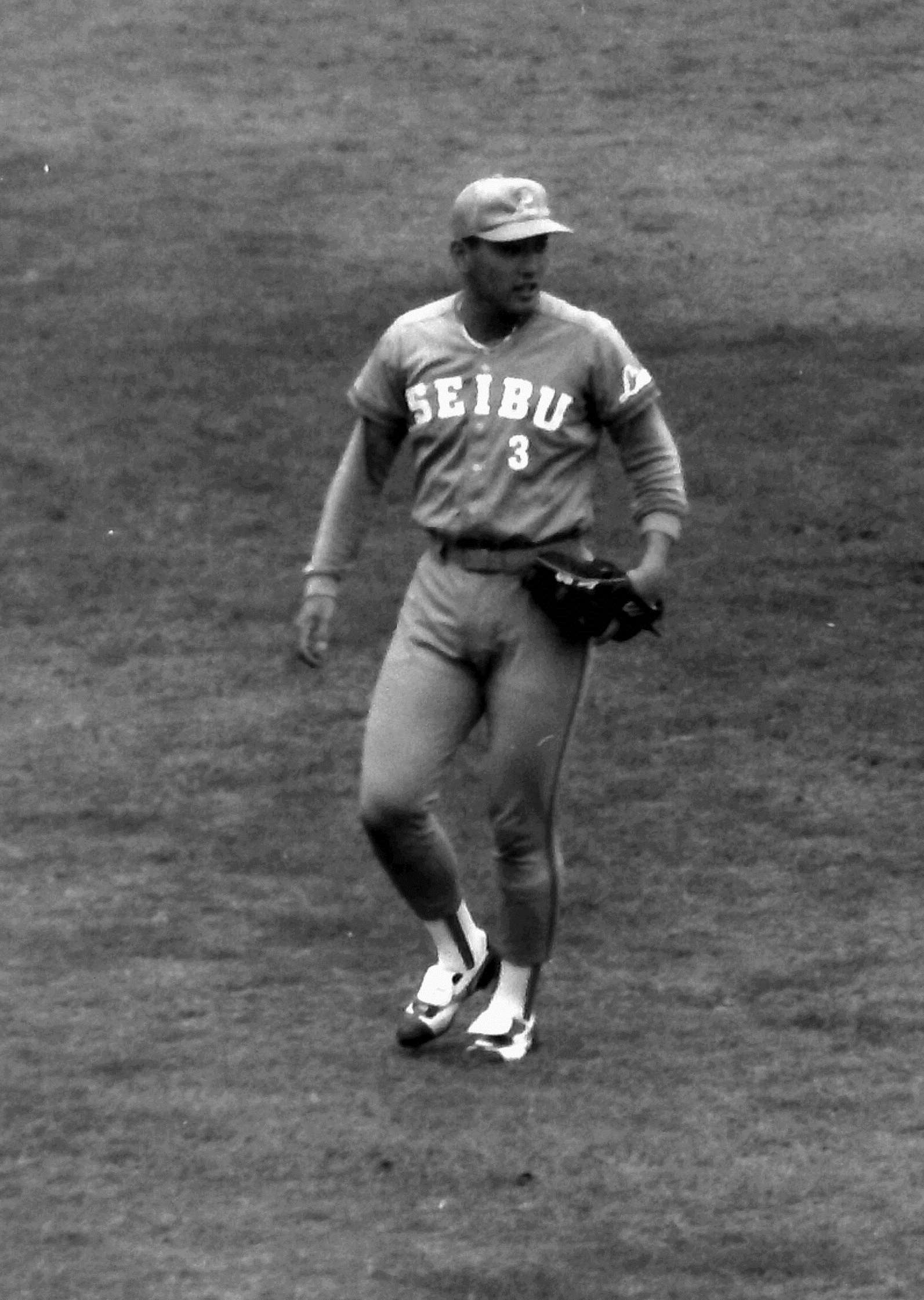
- Infielder
- Born: August 18, 1967 (age 59); Kishiwada, Osaka
- Batted: Right Threw: Right

NPB debut
- April 5, 1986, for the Seibu Lions

Last appearance
- October 1, 2008, for the Orix Buffaloes

NPB statistics (through 2008)
- Batting average: .272
- Hits: 2,122
- Home runs: 525
- RBI: 1,530
- Stats at Baseball Reference

Teams
- As player: Seibu Lions (1985–1996); Yomiuri Giants (1997–2005); Orix Buffaloes (2006–2008)

Career highlights and awards
- 18× NPB All-Star (1986–1998, 2000–2002, 2005, 2006); 8× Japan Series champion (1986–1988, 1990–1992, 2000, 2002); 3× Best Nine Award (1988, 1990, 1992); 5× Golden Glove Award (1988, 1990, 1992–1994)

Kazuhiro Kiyohara (清原 和博, Kiyohara Kazuhiro; born August 18, 1967) is a Japanese television personality, YouTuber and former professional baseball player. He played in Japan's Nippon Professional Baseball league for 23 seasons. He retired following the 2008 season.

Born in Kishiwada, Osaka in 1967, his family were baseball fans. He began his career when he joined his high school baseball team in the 1980s that subsequently won two Japanese High School Baseball Championships. He became a widely respected high school player and was selected by Seibu Lions in 1985. During his time with the Lions, the team won six Japan Series titles and he tied the rookie HR record for Japanese professional baseball. In 1996, he joined the Yomiuri Giants, and was an integral part of their 2000 and 2002 Japan Series championship squads. He later joined the Orix Buffaloes, before retiring in 2008. He has been dubbed "The Uncrowned King" as he never won a major batting title, despite being widely regarded as one of NPB's greatest hitters. He is the eighth and currently last player to have hit 500 home runs in NPB history.

In 2014, Kiyohara was hospitalized after an alleged illegal drug abuse. At first he denied the allegation, after which he was divorced by his wife Aki Kimura due to domestic violence. After a lengthy investigation, in 2016, Kiyohara tested positive for stimulants and was subsequently arrested and given a suspended prison sentence.

After being cast out from television for his conviction, he became a YouTuber posting videos about baseball and weight loss.

== Early life ==
Kazuhiro Kiyohara was born on August 18, 1967, in Kishiwada, Osaka. His family owned an electronics store called Toshiba Store.

His father was a Hanshin Tigers fan while the rest of his family were fans of the Yomiuri Giants. Influenced by this, Kiyohara was a Yomiuri Giants fan growing up.

In 1974, he entered Yagi Minami Elementary School and began playing baseball joining the Kishiwada Little League. In third grade of elementary, he already stood at 155 cm (5 ft 1 in), and recorded 70 km/h (43 mph) in long throw during his entrance test to the league.

In 1977, the fourth grader Kiyohara joined a team of sixth graders and became the only regular of his age. He also displayed his talent as a pitcher.

== Career ==
Kazuhiro Kiyohara became a household name in Japan as a home run hitter for the Osaka PL Gakuen high school baseball team in the mid-1980s. His team won two Japanese High School Baseball Championships, finished second twice, and was fourth on one occasion. (There are spring and summer national high school baseball tournaments annually in Japan, held at the famous Koshien Stadium.)

Kiyohara was one part of a dominant duo on his high school team with his teammate, pitcher Masumi Kuwata. They became known in the popular vernacular of the time as the "K-K Combi", which stood for the Kiyohara and Kuwata combination. They were widely respected as high school players, and their individual and team accomplishments became memorable parts of the history of schoolboy baseball in Japan.

Kiyohara was selected by the Seibu Lions with their first pick of the 1985 draft. This was reportedly a huge disappointment for him because the Yomiuri Giants, the most popular NPB team of the day, had promised to choose him in the draft. However, the Giants decided to take Masumi Kuwata with their initial pick in '85, instead of Kiyohara, which made for great theater in the Japanese mass media at the time.

His rookie season with the Seibu Lions produced a .304 average with 31 home runs and 78 RBIs. He tied the rookie HR record for Japanese professional baseball, and all three previously mentioned statistics were the best totals for a rookie in his first professional season out of high school. He became a top cleanup hitter for the Lions in his eleven seasons with the club, accumulating 332 HRs and 915 RBIs. During his time in a Lions uniform, the team won six Japan Series titles.

Kiyohara qualified for free agency after the 1996 season and signed with the Yomiuri Giants, fulfilling a childhood dream. With the Giants, Kiyohara had some outstanding seasons playing alongside many star players, including future major leaguer Hideki Matsui. Kiyohara suited up for the Giants through the 2005 season, where he collected his 500th home run and 2,000th hit in the same season. He hit his 500th home run on 29 April 2005 against Hiroike Koji at Hiroshima. He was an integral part of their 2000 and 2002 Japan Series championship squads. In what ended up being his last Japan Series appearance as a player in 2002, he hit home runs in Game 1 and Game 3 as the Giants won in a four-game sweep.

In 1997, Kiyohara ranked 5th in the annual competition television program Pro Sportsman No. 1 aired on TBS.

An aging Kiyohara moved from the Giants to the Orix Buffaloes for the final three seasons of his career, calling it quits at the end of the 2008 campaign. He appeared in only 89 games for the Buffaloes, citing various physical ailments for his inactivity.

Despite his many accomplishments, Kiyohara could not escape heavy criticism during the final ten seasons of his career due to a long list of injuries that forced him to miss considerable chunks of almost every season. From 1999–2008, he played in 100 or more games only twice (2001 and 2003), while being paid the equivalent of multimillion-dollar salaries each year.

Kiyohara is often referred as "The Uncrowned King" because he never won a major batting title, even though he was one of NPB's greatest hitters. He surpassed 2,000 hits, 500 home runs, and 1,500 RBIs, which has been accomplished by only five other legendary players (Sadaharu Oh, Katsuya Nomura, Hiromitsu Kadota, Isao Harimoto and Hiromitsu Ochiai).

== Legal issues ==
=== Illegal drug possession ===
==== Illegal drug abuse and hospitalization ====
On March 6, 2014, Bunshun reported that Kiyohara had an emergency hospitalization to treat side effects caused by illegal drug abuse. The report also included a statement by his wife that Kiyohara had chased her with a knife.

However, the next week, Kiyohara gave a statement on Friday denying the drug abuse allegation and that his treatment was due to type 2 diabetes. He also stated that he was going to file a civil lawsuit against Bunshun, but ultimately he never filed a complaint. Bunshun also published that Kiyohara had taken a large dragon tattoo that spanned from his right leg and left chest to his back.

==== Domestic violence and divorce ====
Following the publication of Kiyohara's illegal drug abuse, his wife Aki and a resident of the same building Chisako Takashima testified about Kiyohara's history of domestic violence on Shūkan Bunshun. According to their testimony, Kiyohara had had a series of furious outbursts on his wife, including one incident where Kiyohara had chased her with a knife. According to Takashima, she had heard loud noises from the Kiyohara residence starting at 5 am and thought that "the house was going to fall apart". Furthermore, Bunshun reported that Kiyohara had threatened their journalist and published photos of him assaulting the journalist. It was noted that what made Kiyohara's violent outbursts particularly scary was that he is a large man standing at 190 cm (6 ft 3 in) and weighing over 100 kg (220 lb).

After these incidents, his wife Aki and the couple's two sons moved away from Kiyohara's house. The two divorced in August 2014, and custody of the two sons was given to Aki Kimura.

==== Arrest and investigation ====
On February 2, 2016, Kiyohara was arrested for the possession of illegal drugs. The Tokyo Metropolitan Police had been investigating him for over a year. On 23 February, Kiyohara was arrested after a urinalysis tested positive for stimulants. He was convicted and given a suspended prison sentence.

== YouTube channel ==
Ostracized by Japanese television because of his conviction on illegal drug possession, Kiyohara started a YouTube channel, Kiyochan Sports, in December 2020. Among the video topics, he talks about baseball and losing weight; the channel had more than 320,000 subscribers in March 2021.

== Career statistics ==
Nippon Professional Baseball
Year	Age	Team	G	AB	R	H	2B	3B	HR	TB	RBI	SB	AVG
1986	19	Seibu	126	404	66	123	18	1	31	236	78	6	.304
1987	20	Seibu	130	444	66	115	25	3	29	233	83	11	.259
1988	21	Seibu	130	451	97	129	21	0	31	243	77	5	.286
1989	22	Seibu	128	445	92	126	22	2	35	257	92	7	.283
1990	23	Seibu	129	436	99	134	19	2	37	268	94	11	.307
1991	24	Seibu	126	448	73	121	20	0	23	210	79	3	.270
1992	25	Seibu	129	464	82	134	17	0	36	259	96	5	.289
1993	26	Seibu	128	448	66	120	15	1	25	212	75	3	.268
1994	27	Seibu	129	455	78	127	29	0	26	234	93	5	.279
1995	28	Seibu	118	404	63	99	13	3	25	193	64	2	.245
1996	29	Seibu	130	487	67	125	30	0	31	248	84	0	.245
1997	30	Yomiuri	130	462	65	115	24	0	32	235	95	0	.249
1998	31	Yomiuri	116	384	67	103	14	0	23	186	80	1	.268
1999	32	Yomiuri	86	263	39	62	12	0	13	113	46	0	.236
2000	33	Yomiuri	75	216	41	64	10	0	16	122	54	0	.296
2001	34	Yomiuri	134	467	67	139	29	0	29	255	121	0	.298
2002	35	Yomiuri	55	148	24	47	1	0	12	84	33	0	.318
2003	36	Yomiuri	114	341	47	99	9	0	26	186	68	0	.290
2004	37	Yomiuri	40	101	18	23	2	0	12	61	27	0	.228
2005	38	Yomiuri	96	321	42	68	6	0	22	140	52	0	.212
2006	39	Orix	67	203	21	45	7	0	11	85	36	0	.222
2008	41	Orix	22	22	0	4	2	0	0	6	3	0	.182

Statistics current as of January 13, 2014

== Career record ==
- .272 Batting average
- 2,118 Hits (22nd)
- 525 Home runs (5th)
- 1,530 RBIs (6th)
- 1,280 Runs (9th)
- 1,346 Ball on bases (3rd)
- 1,955 Strikeouts (1st)
- 196 Hit by pitch (1st)

== Trivia ==
- He holds the national record of 20 walk-off hits, 12 walk-off home runs, and 2 walk-off grand slam home runs.
- Koshien Baseball tournament records:
  - National High School Baseball Championship (Summer Koshien)
    - 5 home runs in single tournament (1985)
    - 3 home runs in single game (1984)
    - Home runs in consecutive games (3 games) (1985)
  - National High School Baseball Invitational Tournament (Spring Koshien)
    - 3 home runs in single tournament (1984)
    - 2 home runs in single game (1984)
  - Total home runs in Koshien Baseball tournaments
    - 13 home runs (1983–1985)

== See also ==
- List of top Nippon Professional Baseball home run hitters
- List of Nippon Professional Baseball players with 1,000 runs batted in
- List of Nippon Professional Baseball career hits leaders
