= Kagawa Olive Guyners =

Japanese professional baseball team

- Logo

Information
- League: Shikoku Island League
- Ballpark: Olive Field, Kagawa Prefectural Baseball Complex
- Established: 2005
- 6 championships: 2006, 2007, 2008, 2010, 2012, 2018
- Division championships: 9
- Colors: Olive Green, Gold

The Kagawa Olive Guyners (香川オリーブガイナーズ) are a professional baseball team in the Shikoku Island League Plus of Japan. Established in 2005, the Guyners play at Olive Stadium in the Kagawa Prefectural Baseball Complex in Takamatsu, Kagawa Prefecture.

They won the 2006, 2007, 2008, 2010, 2012 and 2018 season titles by beating other teams in the Island League playoff.

== Franchise history ==
Current Nippon Professional Baseball (NPB) Infielder Masayoshi Miwa played for the Olive Guyners from 2005 to 2007 before joining the Tokyo Yakult Swallows. Utility player Jobu Morita played for the Olive Guyners from 2006 to 2008 before being selected by NPB's Tohoku Rakuten Golden Eagles in the 2008 developmental draft.

Former Nippon Professional Baseball (NPB) player Kohichi Amano pitched for the Olive Guyners in 2007, as did Australian right-hander Todd Grattan and right-hander Ryokan Kobayashi.

Italian right-hander Alex Maestri pitched for team for part of 2012 before signing with NPB's Orix Buffaloes.
