= Matsuyama Central Park Baseball Stadium =

Coordinates: 33°48′30.28″N 132°44′51.09″E

- Botchan Stadium
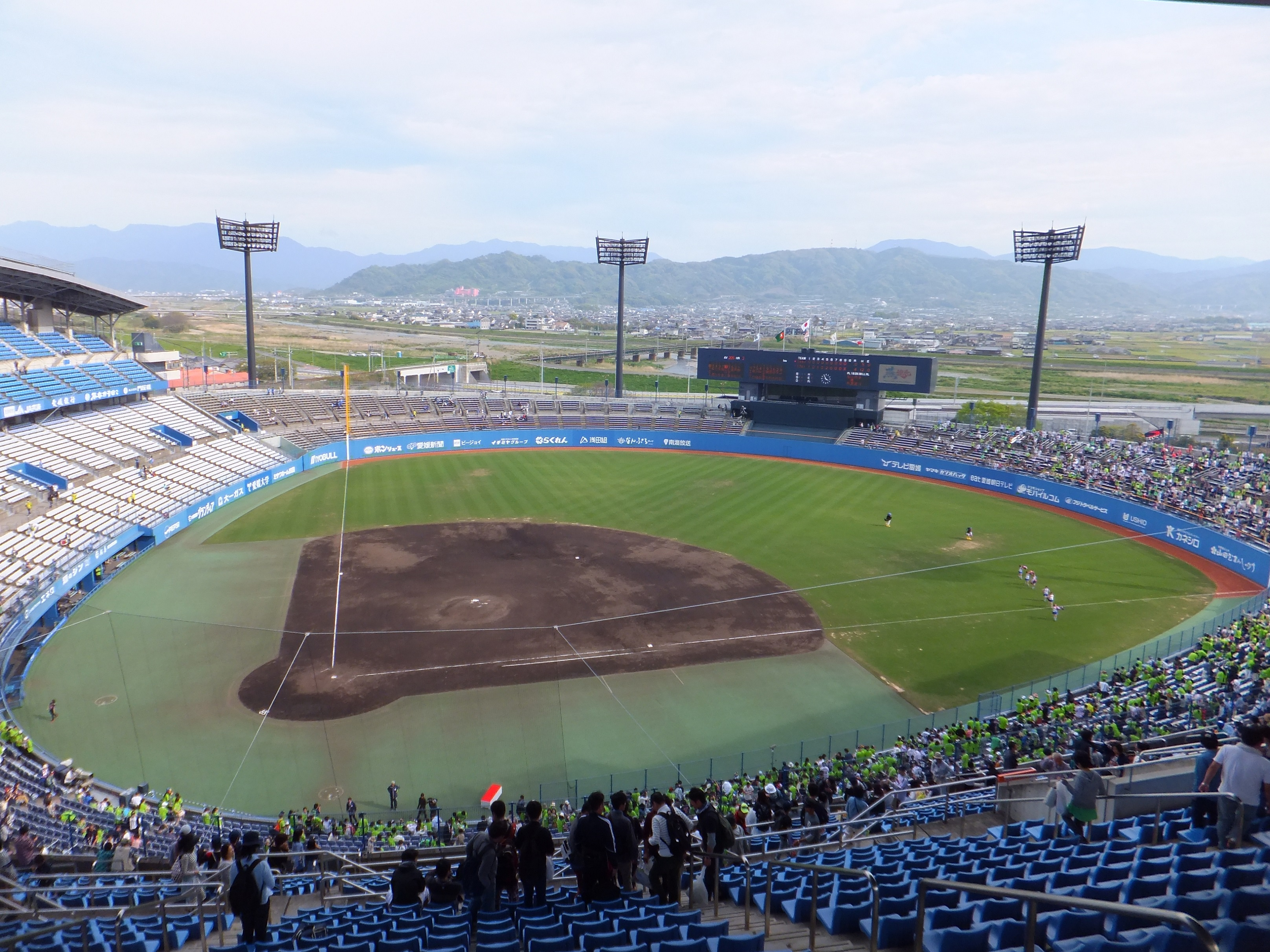
- Location: Matsuyama, Ehime, Shikoku, Japan
- Owner: Matsuyama Culture & Sports Foundation
- Capacity: 30,000
- Field size: left - 99.1 m (325 ft) center - 122 m (400.3 ft) right - 99.1 m (325 ft)
- Opened: 2000

Tenants
- Japanese High School Baseball Championship Ehime Regional; 2008 Women's Baseball World Cup; Ehime Mandarin Pirates

The Matsuyama Central Park Baseball Stadium (松山中央公園野球場, Matsuyama Chūō Kōen Yakyūjō) is a multi-purpose stadium in Matsuyama Central Park, Matsuyama, Ehime, Shikoku, Japan. It is currently used mostly for baseball matches. The stadium holds 30,136 people.

The nickname is "Botchan Stadium". It is named after well-known novel Botchan written by Natsume Sōseki who once lived in Matsuyama.

The stadium is the home ground of the Ehime Mandarin Pirates playing in Shikoku Island League.
