= Kōchi Fighting Dogs =

Japanese professional baseball team

- 高知ファイティングドッグス
- Logo

Information
- League: Shikoku Island League Plus
- Location: Kōchi, Japan
- Ballpark: Kōchi Stadium
- League championships: 2005, 2009
- Website: www.fighting-dogs.jp

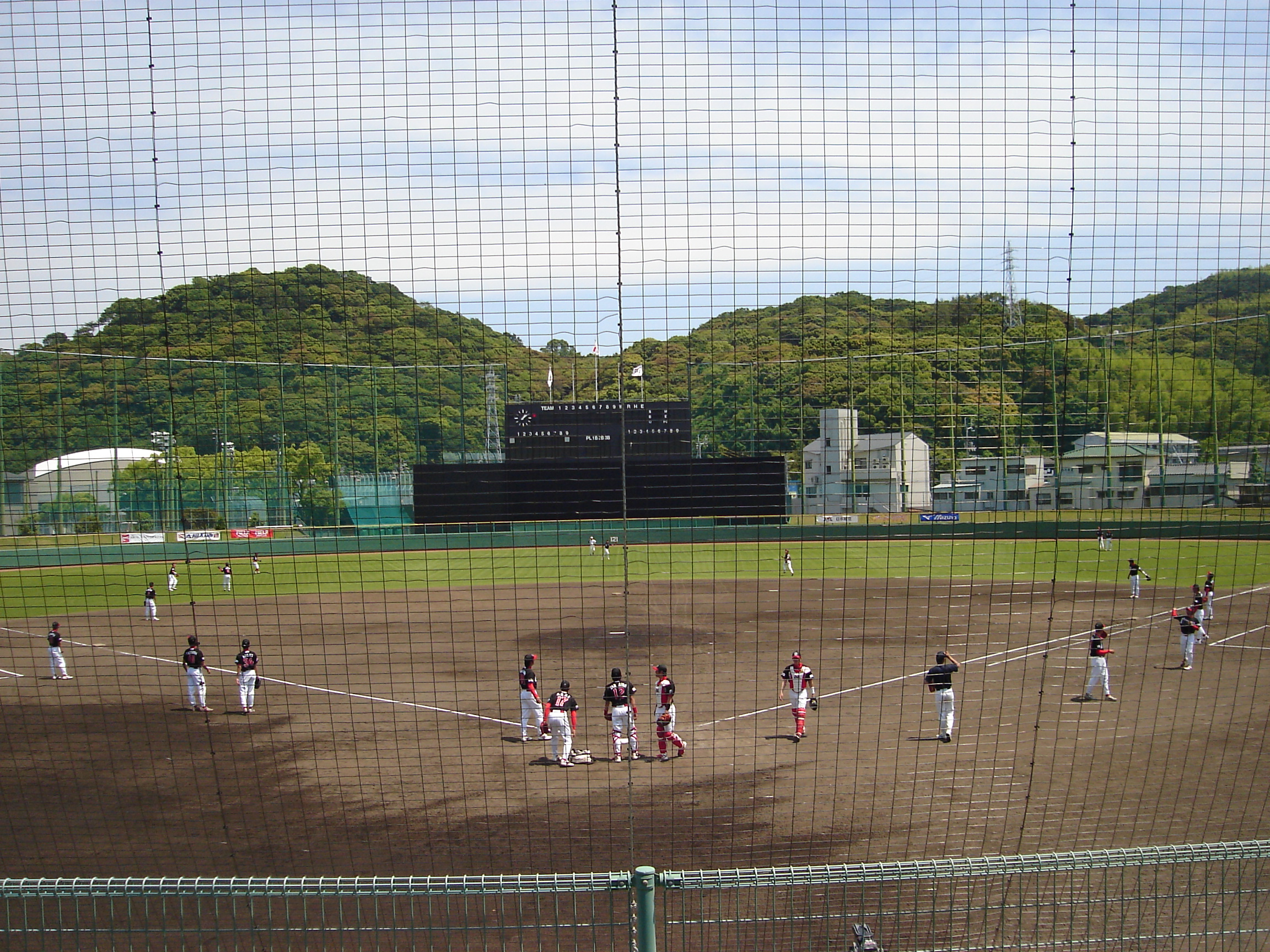
Kochi Municipal Baseball Park

The Kōchi Fighting Dogs (高知ファイティングドッグス, Kōchi Faitingu Doggusu) are a baseball team in the Shikoku Island League Plus of Japan. Established in 2005, the Fighting Dogs play their home games mainly at Kōchi Stadium in Kōchi city of Kōchi Prefecture.

The Dogs were the winners of the League's inaugural 2005 season. They won the 2009 season title by beating Nagasaki Saints in the Island League playoff.

== Notable players ==
- Manny Ramirez
- Lars Anderson
- Hideki Irabu
- Frédéric Hanvi
- Dioni Soriano
- Katsuya Kakunaka
- Takeshi Yamamoto
