= Kagawa Prefectural Baseball Complex =

Sports complex in Kagawa Prefecture, Japan

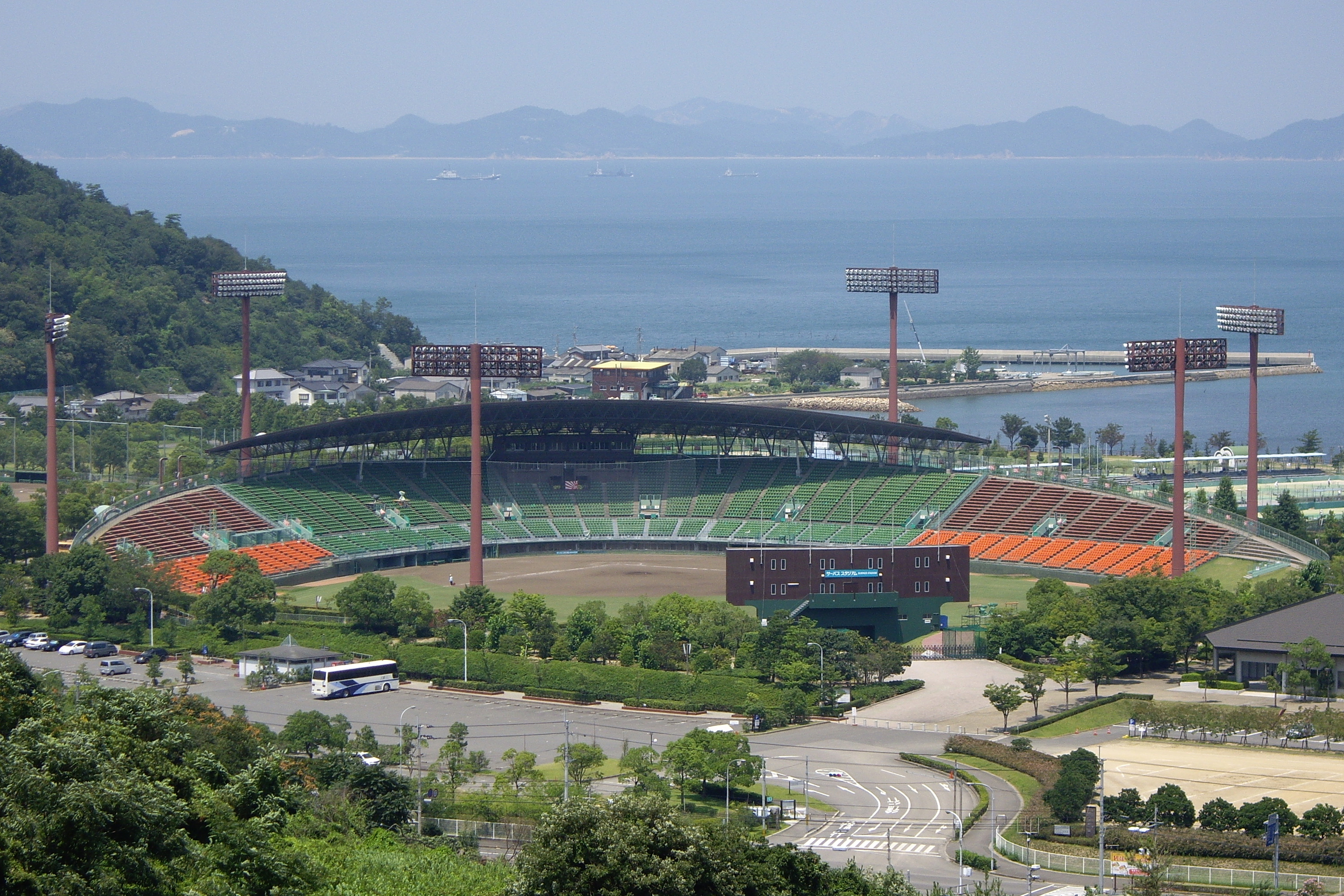
Kagawa Prefectural Baseball Complex in Takamatsu City.

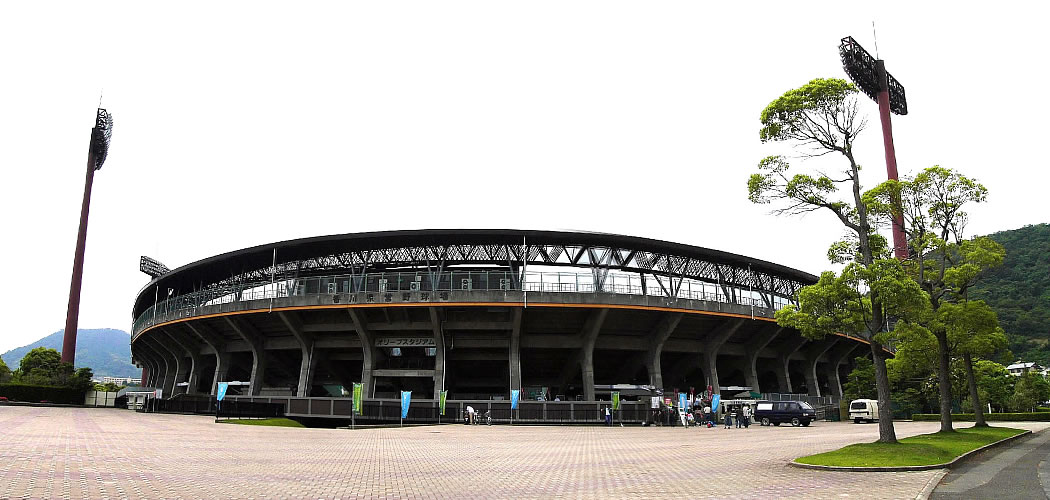
The Front of Baseball Complex

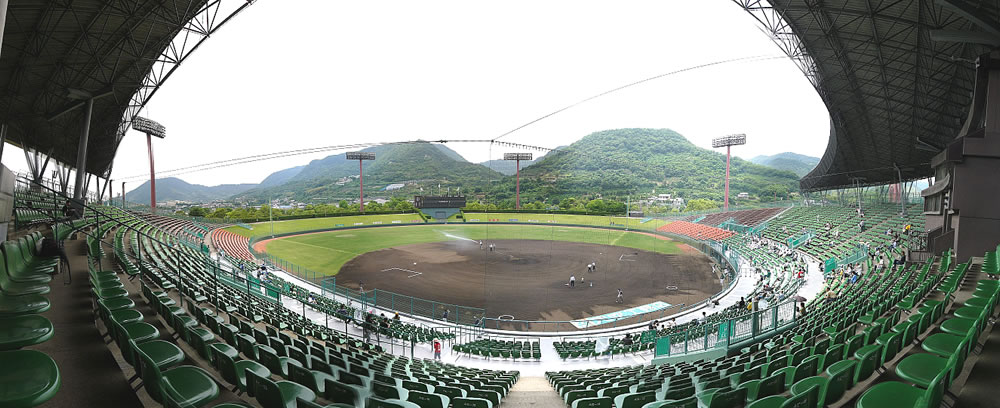
Baseball field

Kagawa Prefectural Baseball Complex (香川県営野球場, Kagawa Ken'ei Yakyūjō) is a multi-purpose sports complex located in Ikushima-chō, Takamatsu, Kagawa Prefecture, Japan. It houses Olive Field, a secondary baseball field, and fields for rugby, soccer, tennis, and softball. The stadium was branded Rexxam Stadium in May 2020.

The Kagawa Olive Guyners, a baseball team playing in Shikoku Island League, mainly play their home games here.
