= Fukuoka Red Warblers =

Defunct Japanese professional baseball team

Information
- League: Shikoku Island League (2008–2009)
- Ballpark: Fukuoka Prefecture
- Established: 2007
- Colors: Red, Dark Blue, White
- Manager: Ryoji Moriyama

The Fukuoka Red Warblers (福岡レッドワーブラーズ) were a baseball team in the Shikoku-Kyūshū Island League of Japan. The team was established as part of the expansion of the league (along with the Nagasaki Saints). They started league play during the 2008 season, lasting through the 2009 season.

The team's home was Fukuoka Prefecture. Its name combined the color of the prefecture's symbol flower, the ume, and the prefectural bird, the Japanese bush-warbler.
