= Masaki Maki =

Japanese baseball player

- Pitcher
- Born: February 13, 1972 (age 53)
- Batted: Left Threw: Left

NPB debut
- 1998, for the Osaka Kintetsu Buffaloes

Last appearance
- 2001, for the Osaka Kintetsu Buffaloes

NPB statistics
- Win–loss record: 14-11
- ERA: 4.71
- Strikeouts: 138

Teams
- Osaka Kintetsu Buffaloes (1998–2001)

Masaki Maki (真木 将樹, born February 13, 1976, in Kitakyushu) is a Japanese former professional baseball pitcher in Japan's Nippon Professional Baseball. He played with the Osaka Kintetsu Buffaloes from 1998 to 2001. He also played for the Calgary Outlaws in the Canadian Baseball League in 2003.
