= Daisuke Masuda =

Japanese baseball player and coach (born 1973)

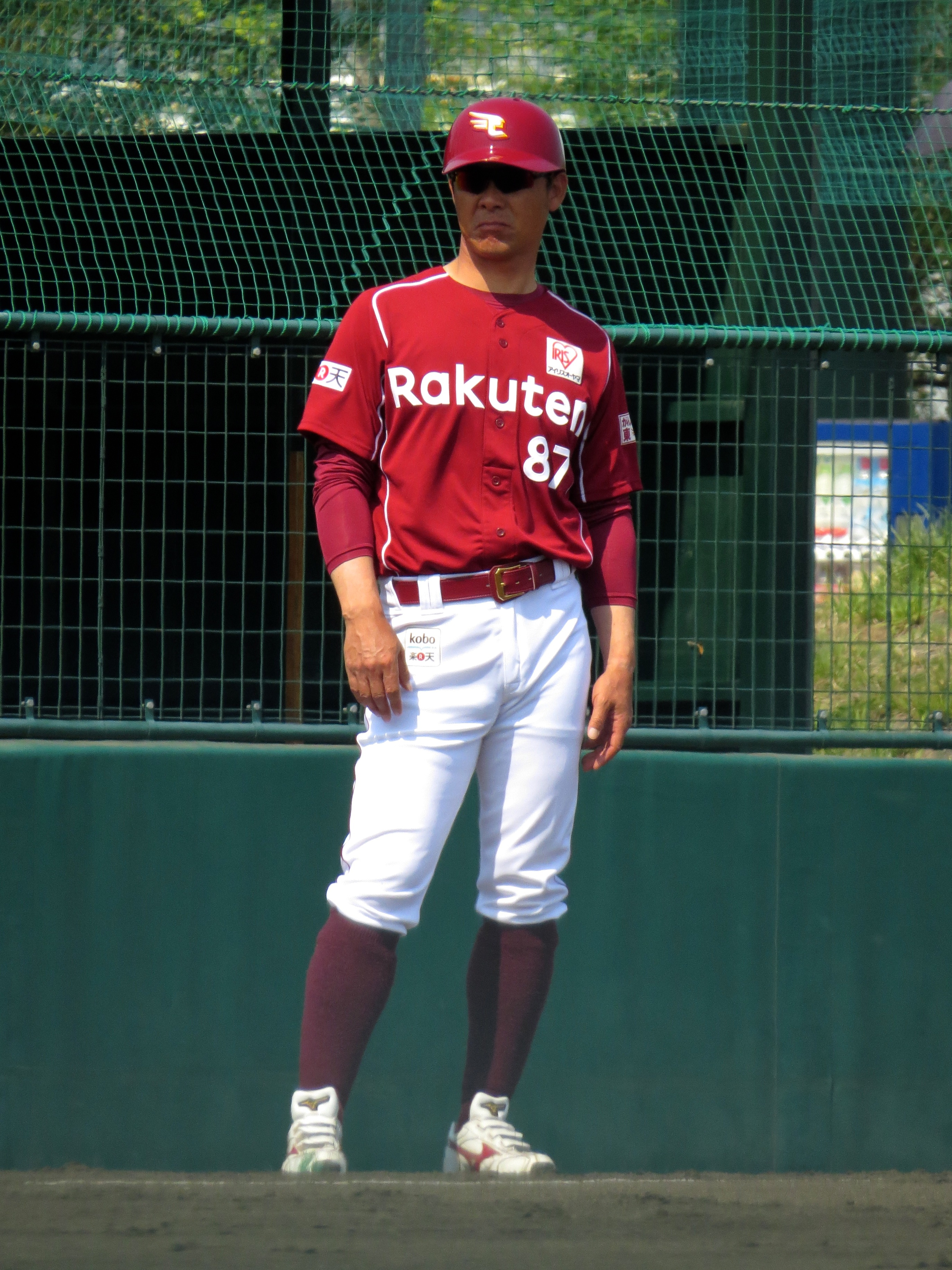
- Outfielder / Coach
- Born: September 27, 1973 (age 52); Akashi, Hyōgo
- Batted: Left Threw: Right

NPB debut
- July 14, 1994, for the Chunichi Dragons

Last NPB appearance
- April 27, 2006, for the Tohoku Rakuten Golden Eagles

NPB statistics (through 2006)
- Batting average: .267
- Home runs: 16
- Hits: 306

Teams
- As player: Chunichi Dragons (1996–2001); Osaka Kintetsu Buffaloes (2001–2004); Tohoku Rakuten Golden Eagles (2005–2006); As coach: Tohoku Rakuten Golden Eagles (2013–2014)
- Last updated on: 18 February 2017

Daisuke Masuda (益田 大介, born September 27, 1973) is a former Nippon Professional Baseball outfielder.
