= Nagasaki Baseball Stadium =

Baseball stadium in Nagasaki, Japan

- Nagasaki Big N Stadium
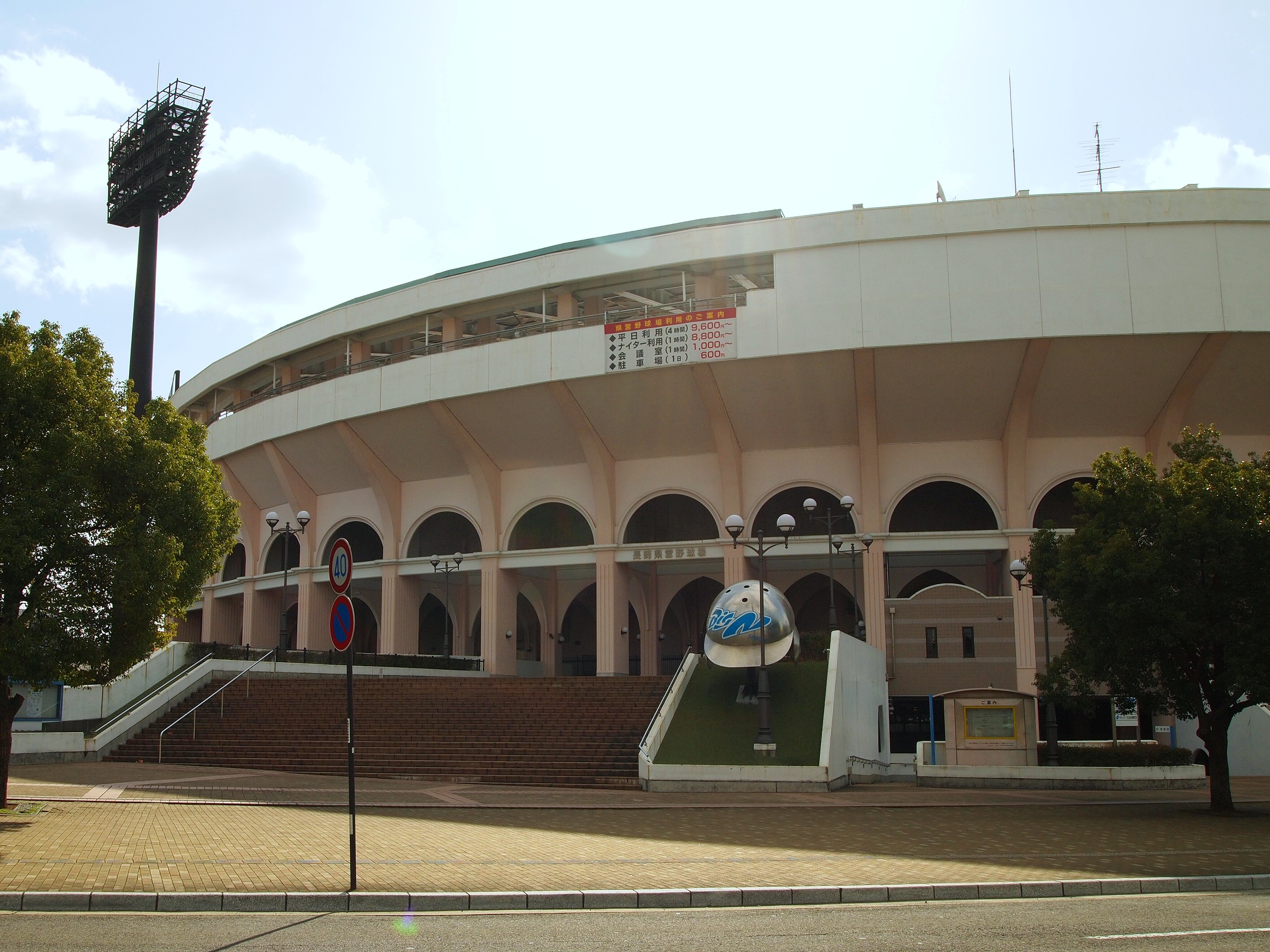
- Interactive map of Nagasaki Baseball Stadium
- Location: 2-5 Matsuyama-machi, Nagasaki Japan
- Coordinates: 32°46′36.38″N 129°51′38.10″E
- Owner: Nagasaki prefecture
- Operator: Nagasaki Prefecture Athletic Association Group
- Capacity: 25,000
- Surface: artificial turf
- Scoreboard: Yes
- Field size: Left & Right field: 325. ft (99.1m); Center field: 400 ft (122 m)
- Acreage: 2,200

Construction
- Opened: July 26, 1997
- Cost: 7.2 billion JPY

Tenant
- Nagasaki Saints (2008 - 09)

Website
- www.pref.nagasaki.jp/nsfinder/yakyu/ya_main.html

Nagasaki Baseball Stadium (長崎県営野球場, Nagasaki Ken'ei Yakyūjō; Nagasaki Big N Stadium) is a baseball stadium in the city of Nagasaki, Japan.

The stadium was built in 1997 and has an all-seated capacity of 25,000. The Nagasaki Saints played some home games there. It is located about 320m from the epicenter of the nuclear bombing of Nagasaki.
