= Masaru Uno =

Japanese baseball player (born 1958)

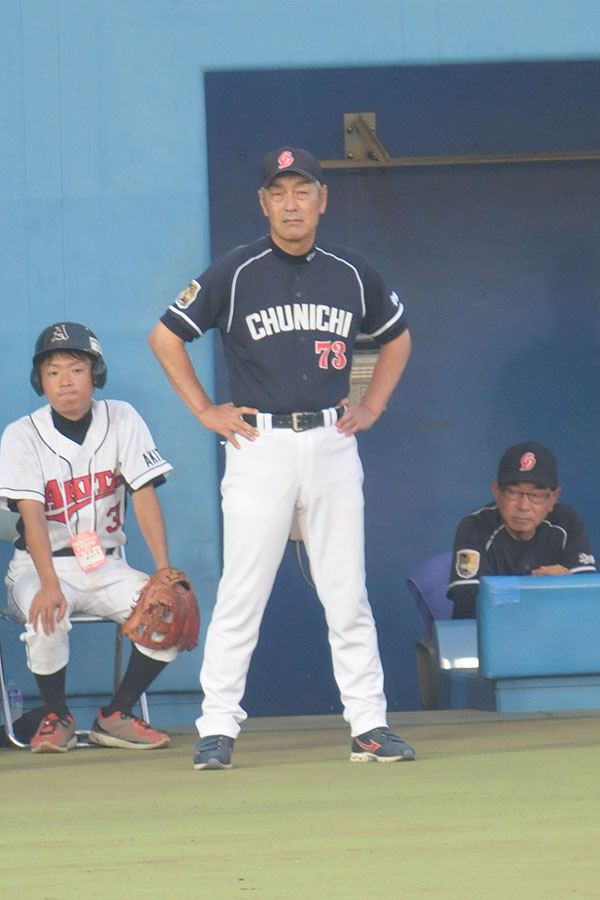
- Infielder
- Born: May 30, 1958 (age 67); Yōkaichiba, Chiba, Japan
- Batted: Right Threw: Right

debut
- 1977, for the Chunichi Dragons

Last appearance
- 1996, for the Chiba Lotte Marines

Career statistics
- Batting average: .262
- Home runs: 338
- Runs batted in: 936
- Stats at Baseball Reference

Teams
- As player: Chunichi Dragons (1977–1992); Chiba Lotte Marines (1993–1994); As coach: Chunichi Dragons (2004–2008, 2012–2013)

Masaru Uno (宇野 勝, Uno Masaru; born May 30, 1958) is a Japanese former professional baseball infielder. He played in Nippon Professional Baseball (NPB) for the Chunichi Dragons from 1977 to 1992, and the Chiba Lotte Marines from 1993 to 1994.
