= Ryusuke Minami =

Japanese baseball player (born 1981)

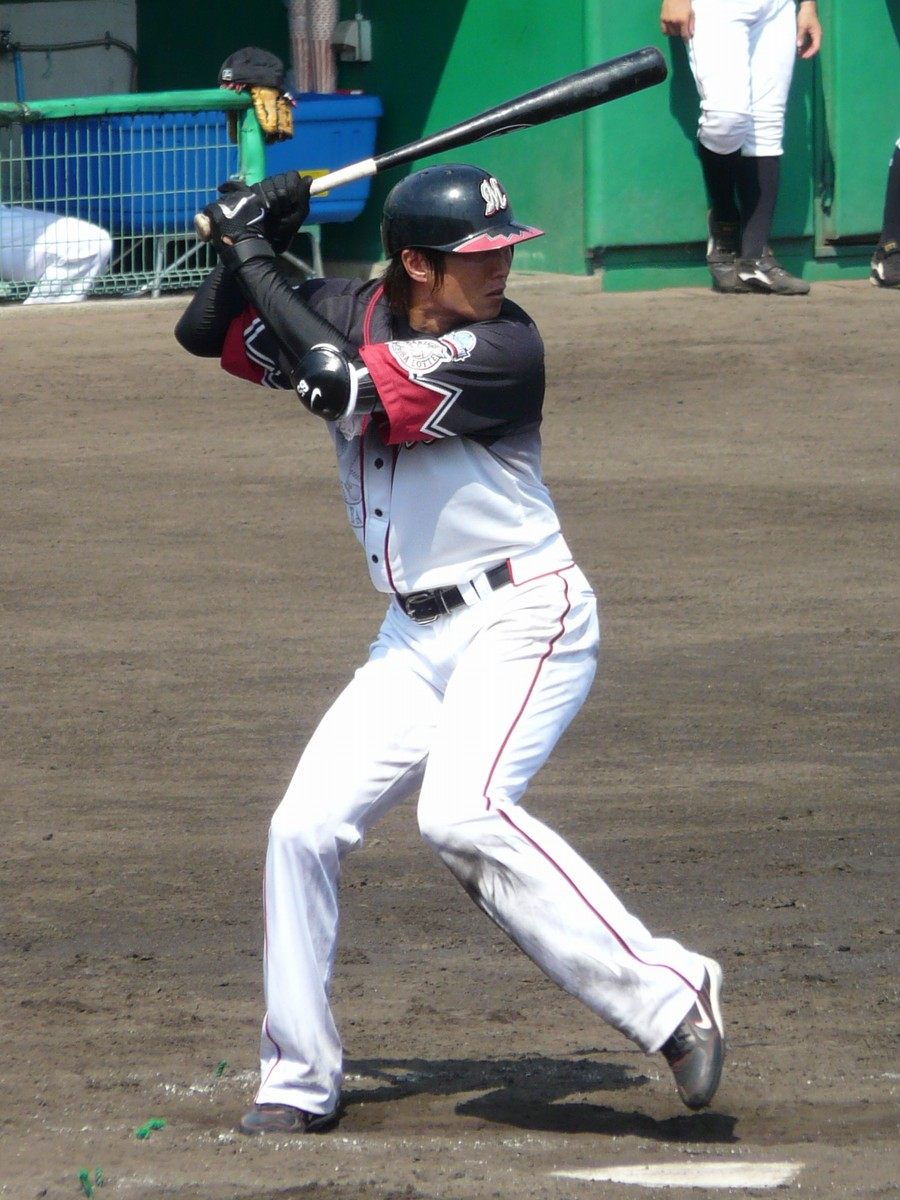
- Outfielder
- Born: July 9, 1981 (age 44)
- Bats: Right Throws: Right

NPB debut
- 2004, for the Yokohama BayStars

NPB statistics (through 2012)
- Batting average: .207
- Home runs: 6
- RBI: 20
- Stats at Baseball Reference

Teams
- Yokohama BayStars (2004–2005); Chiba Lotte Marines (2006–2012)

Ryusuke Minami (Japanese: 南 竜介, born July 9, 1981, in Nishinomiya) is a Japanese former professional baseball outfielder in Japan's Nippon Professional Baseball. He played for the Yokohama BayStars in 2004 and 2005 and the Chiba Lotte Marines from 2006 to 2012. He attended Hōtoku Gakuen High School.
