= Issei Morita =

Japanese baseball player (born 1989)

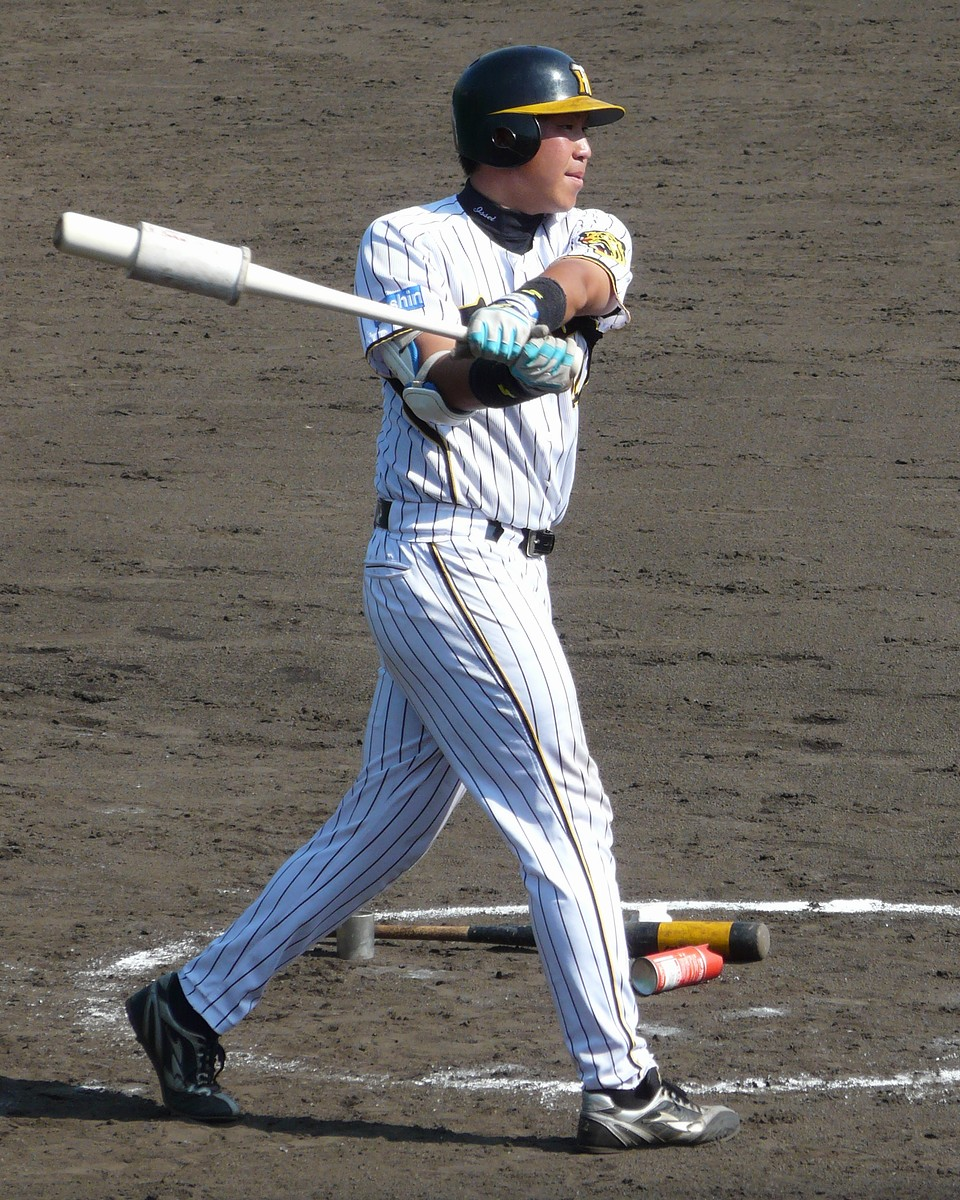
- Infielder
- Born: August 4, 1989 (age 36)
- Bats: Left Throws: Right

NPB debut
- 2011, for the Hanshin Tigers

NPB statistics (through 2013)
- Batting average: .227
- Home runs: 1
- RBI: 11
- Stats at Baseball Reference

Teams
- Hanshin Tigers (2011–2013)

Issei Morita (森田一成, Morita Issei; born August 4, 1989) is a Japanese former professional baseball infielder who played for the Hanshin Tigers in Japan's Nippon Professional Baseball from 2011 to 2013.
