= Nagasaki Saints =

Defunct Japanese professional baseball team

Information
- League: Shikoku Island League (2009–2010)
- Ballpark: Nagasaki Baseball Stadium
- Established: 2008
- Colors: Dark Blue, Gold
- Manager: Hiroshi Nagadomi

The Nagasaki Saints (長崎セインツ) were a semi-professional baseball team in the Shikoku-Kyūshū Island League of Japan that played in Nagasaki Prefecture. The team was established as part of the league's expansion in 2008, along with the Fukuoka Red Warblers.

In 2009, the team won a half-season championship. Following the 2010 season, the team announced that it would not participate in the league's 2011 season; the Saints were officially dissolved in September 2010.
