= Hiromichi Ishige =

Japanese baseball player and manager (born 1956)

- Infielder
- Born: September 22, 1956 (age 69); Asahi, Chiba, Japan
- Batted: Right Threw: Right

debut
- April 4, 1981, for the Seibu Lions

Last appearance
- July 28, 1996, for the Fukuoka Daiei Hawks

Career statistics
- Batting average: .283
- Home runs: 236
- Hits: 1,833
- Stats at Baseball Reference

Teams
- As player: Seibu Lions (1981–1994); Fukuoka Daiei Hawks (1995–1996); As manager: Orix BlueWave (2002–2003)

Career highlights and awards
- 1981 Pacific League Rookie of the Year; 1986 Pacific League MVP

Hiromichi Ishige (石毛 宏典, born September 22, 1956) is a retired Japanese professional baseball player and manager in Japan's Nippon Professional Baseball. He played most of his career for the Seibu Lions.

Ishige was the 1986 Pacific League Most Valuable Player, a seven-time Best Nine Award-winner, and a ten-time Gold Glove winner. A 14-time All-Star, he left a track record in 16 years as a shortstop and third baseman in the Pacific League.

Ishige was drafted by the Lotte Orions in the third round of the 1974 NPB draft, but went to college instead. He won a Tokyo Metropolitan University League batting title and made six Best Nines in college. He was then picked in the first round of the 1980 NPB draft by the Seibu Lions.

Ishige made the All-Star team as a rookie with Seibu and would make it all 14 seasons he was with them. He hit .311/.380/.531 that first year with 21 homers and 25 steals (in 34 tries). He won a Gold Glove, made his first Best Nine and won Rookie of the Year honors. Ishige's production slipped to a .259/.337/.401 line in 1982 though he stole 22 in 26 tries and won a Gold Glove and Best Nine. He hit .296/.321/.370 in his first Japan Series, to help Seibu take the 1982 Series but was thrown out in two of three steal attempts.

In 1983, Ishige hit .303/.593/.503 with 29 steals in 34 tries, hit 16 homers, scored 86 runs, won another Gold Glove, earned a third Best Nine spot and tied Yutaka Fukumoto and Hiromi Matsunaga for the PL lead with 7 triples. He hit .276/.276/.379 as Seibu won another Japan Series, but was 0 for 1 in steals. The next year, Ishige batted .259/.338/.498 with 91 runs, 26 homers and 26 steals (in 36 tries); Keijiro Yumioka beat him out for the Best Nine that time.

While he only stole 11 bases (in 14 tries) in 1985, Ishige remained a potent offensive force, chipping in at a .280/.386/.508 clip with 96 runs, 27 homers and 88 walks. His 26 doubles led the league and he won another Gold Glove and Best Nine. In the 1985 Japan Series, Hiromichi hit .208/.296/.583 with 3 home runs in a losing effort.

Ishige won his MVP in 1986, when he batted .329/.386/.531, won another Gold Glove at short, scored 91 runs, drove in 89, smacked 27 home runs and stole 19 bases. He set a Nippon Pro Baseball record by leading off eight games with home runs and set a Seibu club record with a 23-game hitting streak. He hit .297/.297/.405 as Seibu won a hard-fought 1986 Japan Series over the Hiroshima Carp.

In '87, Hiromichi hit .269/.331/.370 in an off-year but still won a Gold Glove and made the Best Nine. He batted .348/.423/.652 in the 1987 Japan Series to win his fourth ring. That winter, he assumed chairmanship of the board of directors of the Japan Professional Baseball Players Association, replacing Hiromitsu Ochiai; two years later, Akinobu Okada would take the role.

The 31-year-old had his third and last 20-20 year in 1988 (21 HR, 22 SB in 26 tries; he would never hit 20 homers again) and batted .283/.364/.441 and won his 7th Gold Glove. He had his best Series, the 1989 Japan Series, hitting .389/.389/.944 with 3 HR, 5 runs and 6 RBI in five games to win the Series MVP award. In '89, Ishige stole 28 in 33 tries for his final 20-steal season and batted .270/.395/.428. He drew 98 walks, a career-best and led the PL in that category.

Ishige hit .298/.364/.429 in 1990 and was 7 for 8 in steals. Now a third baseman, he fielded .991, a Pacific League record for the position. He went 1 for 12 in the 1990 Japan Series but drew four walks as his club won a sixth Series. At one point, he had hit in 17 straight games in a Japan Series, a record.

In '91, the veteran still produced at a .269/.331/.424 rate and he hit .280/.333/.440 in the 1991 Japan Series, Seibu's seventh victory in his time with the club. He won his first Gold Glove in three years. In 1992, Ishige batted .297/.359/.413, won a Gold Glove and made his seventh Best Nine, the first in five years. He hit .240/.286/.440 as Seibu took the 1992 Japan Series for their eighth Series win in his 12 seasons, marking it as the greatest Pacific League dynasty ever — other key contributors in the run had included Koji Akiyama, Kimiyasu Kudoh, Hisanobu Watanabe, Orestes Destrade, Kazuhiro Kiyohara, Taigen Kaku, Osamu Higashio, and Tetsuya Shiozaki. Ishige was the captain of the team during the last stretch of Series victories at least. Destrade recalls that Ishige was the team's motivator.

Ishige continued to produce as the 36-year-old put up a .306/.389/.479 batting line in 1993, won his last Gold Glove and made his final Best Nine. He hit .304/.385/.304 in the 1993 Japan Series as Seibu fell in 7 games to the Yakult Swallows to end their dynastic run. In '94, Hiromichi hit .266/.335/.397 and made his last All-Star appearance. He went 1 for 12 with three walks in the 1994 Japan Series.

Leaving Seibu after 14 All-Star seasons and 8 titles in 14 years, Ishige moved on to the Fukuoka Daiei Hawks, where the 38-year-old hit .200/.260/.275 to signal that his glory days were definitely gone. Fellow faded star Matsunaga was the primary third baseman that year. In 1996, Ishige concluded his playing career by going 3 for 23 for Daiei.

Overall, Ishige hit .283/.362/.450 in 7,570 plate appearances, cracked 236 homers and stole 243 in 314 tries. Through 2006, Hiromichi ranks 25th all-time in NPB in runs (1,049, 10 behind Matsunaga), 18th in sacrifice bunts (218; manager Masahiko Mori often had him bunt as he felt Ishige hit into too many double plays in the clutch. Destrade, on the other hand, described him as a timely player who drove in key runs, showing how different perceptions of "clutch play" can be) and 22nd in strikeouts (1,127). With one more year as a regular, he likely would have been in the top 30 in walks as well.

After retiring as a player, Ishige was a minor league manager for Seibu for two years then spent a year as a commentator for NHK in 1999. When manager Akira Ohgi was let go after the 2001 season, the Orix BlueWave hired Ishige to replace him as manager. The club fell from above-.500 in '01 to 50-87-3 and last place. The next year, they started poorly and Ishige lambasted high-strikeout sluggers Fernando Seguignol and Scott Sheldon. After a 7-12-1 start, Ishige was let go and they brought in Leon Lee as the new manager, the first African-American manager in NPB history. Lee fared no better with the sorry lot and they finished last again.

In 2005, Ishige founded the independent Shikoku Island League (now known as Shikoku Island League Plus).
