= Rob Mattson =

- Pitcher
- Born: November 18, 1966 (age 59); West Palm Beach, Florida
- Batted: Left Threw: Right

NPB debut
- May 15, 1998, for the Kintetsu Buffaloes

Last appearance
- October 10, 1999, for the Osaka Kintetsu Buffaloes
- Stats at Baseball Reference

Teams
- Kintetsu Buffaloes / Osaka Kintetsu Buffaloes (1998–1999)

Donald Robert Mattson Jr. (born November 18, 1966) is a former professional baseball pitcher who played professionally from 1991 to 2001.

== Career ==
Mattson played in the Atlanta Braves minor league system in 1991, playing for both the Macon Braves and the Durham Bulls. In 1992, he played for the Beloit Brewers. In 1995 and 1996, Mattson played for the Memphis Chicks in the San Diego Padres organization. In 1998 and 1999, he played for the Osaka Kintetsu Buffaloes in Japan's Nippon Professional Baseball. After the completion of the 1999 season in Japan he went on to sign with the Hyundai Unicorns of the KBO in Korea for 2000. He was respectively released by Hyundai, upon a ruling by the KBO that their pitcher that they had transferred to the Tokyo Giants for a reported 3 million dollars, had to come back to Korea and play with Hyundai for one more year before he would be allowed to play in Japan. Wanted by several teams in Korea including the Samsung Lions earlier in the signing period, but by this time teams had already signed other pitcher's. Rob went on to play for the Pittsburgh Pirates 3A team in the Nashville Sounds instead. He also played for the Olmecas de Tabasco of the Mexican League in 2001.
