= Fukuoka (surname) =

Fukuoka is a Japanese surname. Notable people with the surname include:

- Haruna Fukuoka (福岡 春菜, born 1984), Japanese table tennis player
- Hikari Fukuoka (福岡晶, born 1971), Japanese professional wrestler
- Kayoko Fukuoka (福岡 加余子; born 1949), Japanese tennis player
- Kenki Fukuoka (福岡 堅樹; born 1992), Japanese rugby union player
- Masaaki Fukuoka (福岡 政章; born 1984), Japanese judoka
- Masanobu Fukuoka (1913–2008), author of The One Straw Revolution, pioneer of no-till farming
- Tomio Fukuoka (福岡富雄, born 1936) Japanese educator
- Shimpei Fukuoka (福岡 慎平; born 2000), Japanese footballer
- Fukuoka Takachika (1835–1919), Japanese statesman of the Meiji period
