= Ryoji Moriyama =

Japanese baseball player & coach (born 1963)

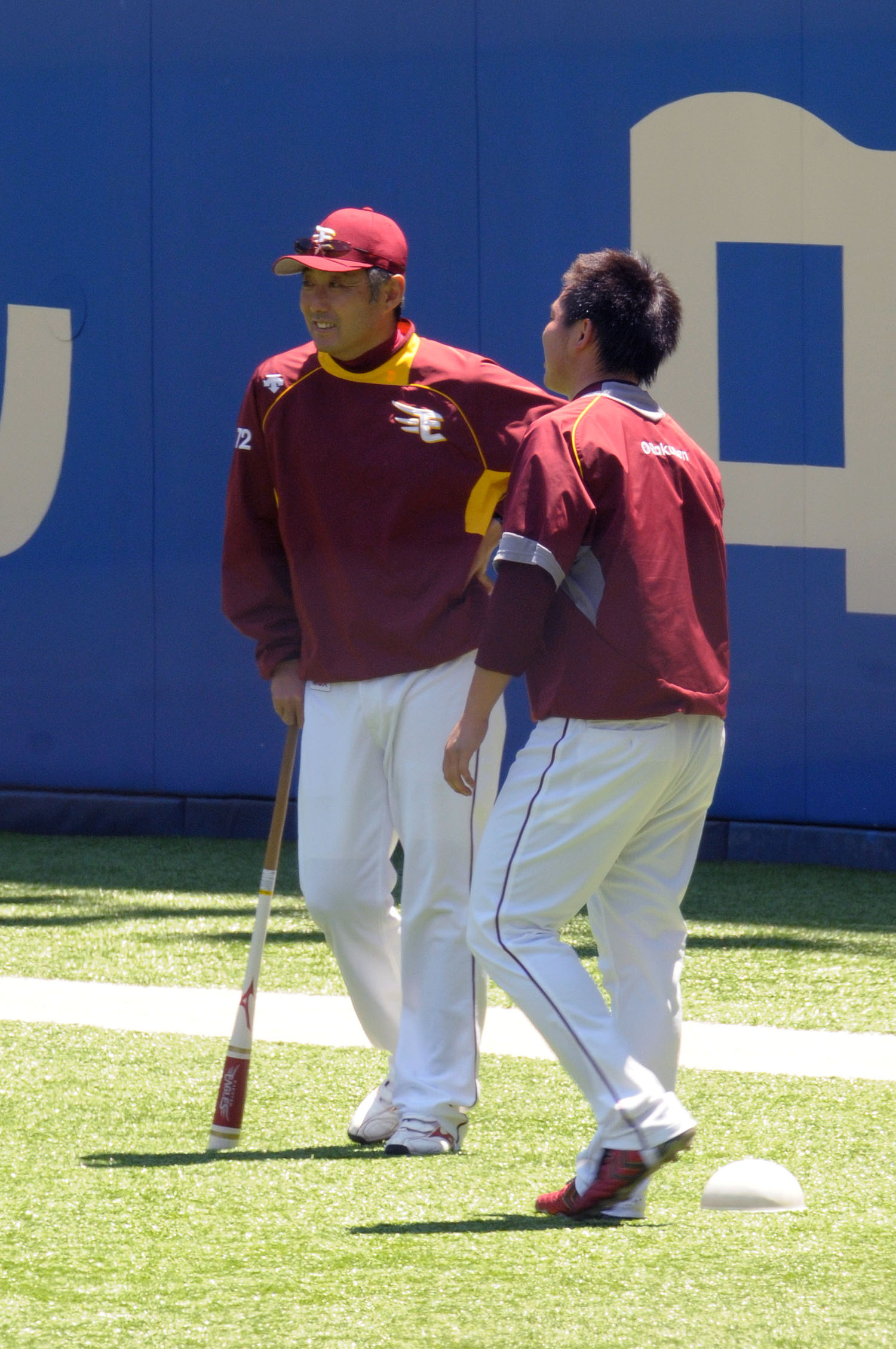
- Moriyama with the Tohoku Rakuten Golden Eagles

Samsung Lions – No. 84
- Pitcher / Coach / Manager
- Born: July 20, 1963 (age 62); Kitakyushu, Fukuoka, Japan
- Batted: Right Threw: Right

NPB debut
- September 10, 1987, for the Seibu Lions

Last NPB appearance
- June 17, 1995, for the Yokohama BayStars

NPB statistics
- Win–loss record: 14–15
- Earned run average: 4.21
- Strikeouts: 156
- Stats at Baseball Reference

Teams
- As player: Seibu Lions (1987–1992); Yokohama BayStars (1993–1995); As manager and coach: Yokohama BayStars (1996–1997); Seibu Lions (1998–2007); Fukuoka Red Warblers (2008–2009); Tohoku Rakuten Golden Eagles (2010–2019); Fukuoka SoftBank Hawks (2020–2025); Samsung Lions (2026–present)

Career highlights and awards
- As player: 5x Japan Series champion (1987, 1988, 1990, 1991, 1992); 1988 Pacific League Rookie of the Year; As coach: 2x Japan Series champion (2013, 2025)

Ryoji Moriyama (森山 良二, Moriyama Ryōji; born July 20, 1963) is a Japanese professional baseball Coach and former pitcher.

He previously was the pitcher's rehabilitation coach for the Fukuoka SoftBank Hawks of Nippon Professional Baseball (NPB).

He played in NPB for the Seibu Lions, and the Yokohama BayStars.

== Professional career ==
=== Active player era ===
On November 20, 1986, Moriyama was drafted first round pick by the Seibu Lions in the 1986 Nippon Professional Baseball draft.

He made his debut in the Pacific League during the 1987 season, pitched in 4 games.

In the 1988 season, he won 10 games as a starting pitcher and honored for the 1988 Pacific League Rookie of the Year Award.

He was traded to the Yokohama BayStars in March before the start of the 1993 season, his seventh career season.

He played three seasons with the BayStars and retired after the 2005 season.

In his 9-season career, Moriyama pitched in 86 games, posting a 14-15 win–loss record, and a 4.21 ERA.

=== After retirement ===
After his retirement, Moriyama was the pitching coach for the Yokohama Bay Stars during the 1996–1997 season.

He served as the Seibu Lions' first squad and second squad pitching coach from the 1998–2007 seasons.

He also served as manager of the Fukuoka Red Warblers of the Independent League during the 2008–2009 season.

In the 2010 season, he was named first squad pitching coach for the Tohoku Rakuten Golden Eagles and served through the 2019 season.

In the 2020–2022 season, Moriyama served as the first squad pitching coach of the Fukuoka SoftBank Hawks.

He served as the third squad manager in the 2023 season.

On December 2, 2023, he was transferred to the pitcher's rehabilitation coach.
