= Masayoshi Miwa =

Japanese baseball player (born 1984)

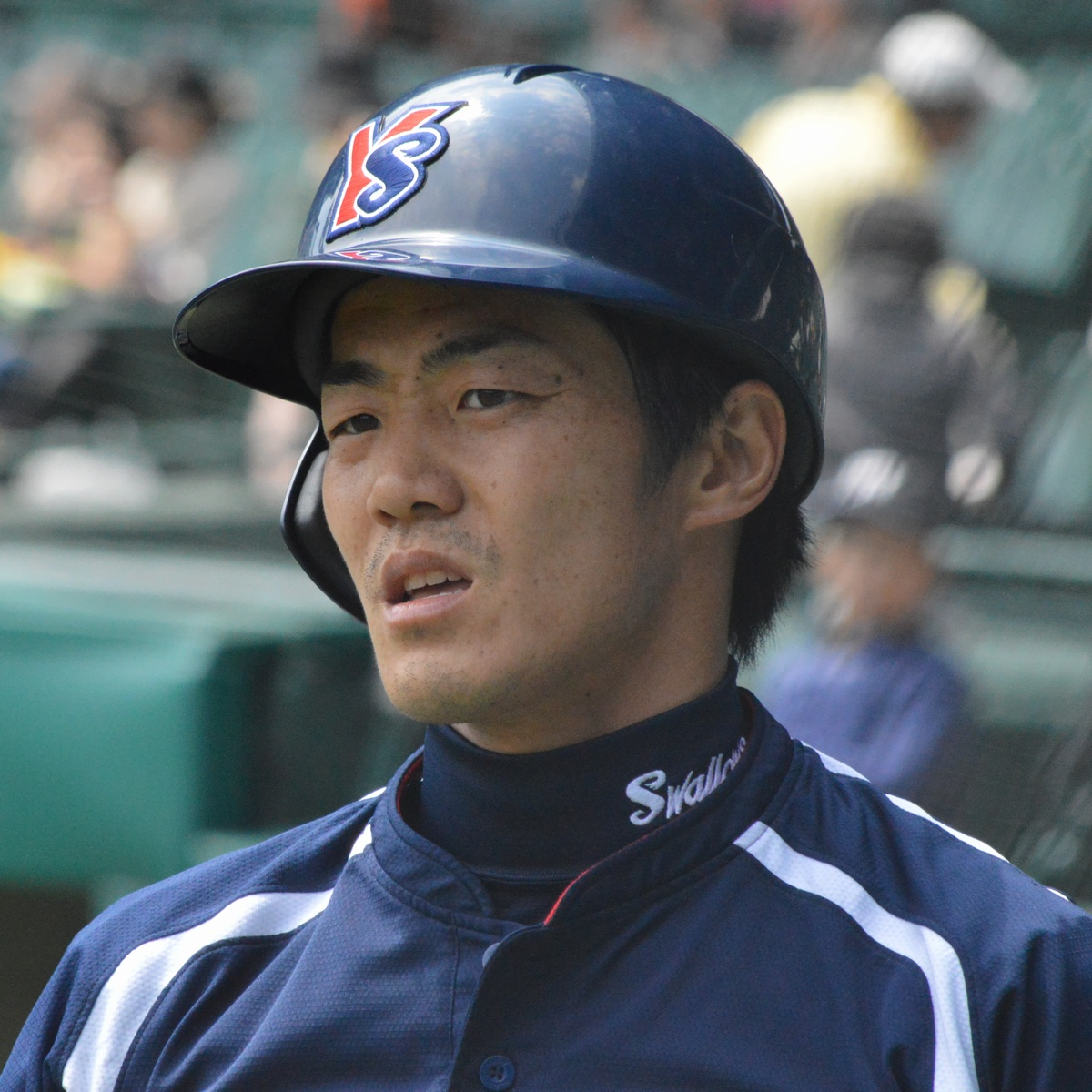

Tokyo Yakult Swallows – No. 74
- Infielder / Coach
- Born: January 23, 1984 (age 42); Shimonoseki, Yamaguchi, Japan
- Batted: Left Threw: Right

debut
- July 10, 2009, for the Tokyo Yakult Swallows

Last appearance
- September 8, 2018, for the Tokyo Yakult Swallows

Career statistics
- Batting average: .236
- Runs batted in: 16
- Home runs: 0
- Stats at Baseball Reference

Teams
- As player: Tokyo Yakult Swallows (2008–2019); As coach: Tokyo Yakult Swallows (2026-present)

Masayoshi Miwa (三輪 正義, Miwa Masayoshi; born January 23, 1984 in Shimonoseki, Yamaguchi, Japan) is a former Japanese professional baseball player. He played for the Tokyo Yakult Swallows of the Nippon Professional Baseball(NPB).

On September 17, 2019, Miwa announced his retirement.
