= Genji Kaku =

Taiwanese baseball player

Genji Kaku Yuen-chih Kuo 佳久 源治 郭源治
- Pitcher
- Born: October 5, 1956 (age 69); Taitung, Taiwan
- Batted: Right Threw: Right

Professional debut
- NPB: August 30, 1981, for the Chunichi Dragons
- CPBL: April 13, 1997, for the Unilions

Last appearance
- NBP: August 29, 1996, for the Chunichi Dragons
- CPBL: October 11, 1999, for the Chinatrust Whales

NPB statistics
- Win–loss record: 106–106
- Earned run average: 3.22
- Strikeouts: 1,415

CPBL statistics
- Win–loss record: 28–11
- Earned run average: 2.67
- Strikeouts: 204
- Stats at Baseball Reference

Teams
- Chunichi Dragons (1981–1996); Uni-President Lions (1997); Chinatrust Whales (1998–1999)

Genji Kaku (Japanese: 佳久 源治, Hepburn: Kaku Genji), or Kuo Yuen-chih (Chinese: 郭源治; pinyin: Guō Yuánzhì, born October 5, 1956), is a Taiwanese former professional baseball player from Taitung, Taiwan. His family is of Amis descent. He obtained Japanese citizenship in September 1989, and holds dual Japanese/Taiwan citizenship since 1999. While in Japan, he often uses the Japanese name, Genji Kaku, which is pronounced the same way as his Chinese name read in Japanese on'yomi.

== Biography ==
Kaku first traveled to Japan in 1969 as part of the Taiwanese little league team, where his team won the little league championship. Kaku finished his military service in Taiwan, and joined the Chunichi Dragons in mid-1981. He was not regarded as a star player at that time, and arrived in Japan with only about 3000 yen (roughly $30) in his pocket.

His sharp fastball (hit 94 mph) and breaking pitches quickly earned him a spot on the starting rotation, and he won over 10 games from 1983 to 1986. However, he also lost over 10 games each of these seasons due to poor run support.

In 1987, Dragons closer Kazuhiko Ushijima was traded to the Lotte Marines for Hiromitsu Ochiai, and manager Senichi Hoshino chose Kaku as the new closer. Kaku was a huge success in the closing role, using his solid control and hard screwball to lead the Central League in saves in 1987 and 1988. The Dragons won the league championship in 1988, and Kaku received the league MVP award despite having to return to Taiwan during the season to mourn for his younger brother, who had died in a car accident.

Kaku obtained Japanese citizenship in 1989, and has a Japanese wife. He returned to the starting rotation in 1990, winning 13 games in 1991. He became a reliever in 1993, and became the fifth Japanese player in history to record 100 wins and 100 saves in 1994. He also led the league with a 2.45 ERA that year. He played his final season in Japan in 1996.

Kaku played in the Chinese Professional Baseball League from 1997 to 1999. He also participated in the preliminary rounds of the 2000 Summer Olympics with the Taiwanese national team in 1999 at the age of 42.

After retiring from baseball, he opened a restaurant in Naka-ku, Nagoya. Kaku's jersey number (33) is a retired number for the Chinese Taipei national baseball team.

He has been serving as the head consultant for the Chinese Professional Baseball League since 2013.

Kaku was married to a flight attendant since 1988 and has a pair of twin sons, Yō Kaku and an actor, So Kaku, and two daughters.
