= Shikoku Island League Plus =

Japanese professional baseball league

- Sport: Baseball
- Founded: 2005
- CEO: Makoto Kagiyama
- No. of teams: 4
- Country: Japan
- Most recent champion: Ehime Mandarin Pirates
- Most titles: Kagawa Olive Guyners; Tokushima Indigo Socks (7)

The Shikoku Island League Plus (四国アイランドリーグplus, Shikoku Airando Rīgu purasu) is an independent professional baseball league on the island of Shikoku in Japan. (None of the teams in Nippon Professional Baseball are based in Shikoku.) The league currently has four teams, and has its league headquarters in Takamatsu.

The Shikoku Island League has two principal sponsors, the Shikoku Railway Company (JR Shikoku) and the Shikoku Coca-Cola Bottling Company. Other sponsors include Taiyo Oil Company, Shikoku Meiji Dairies, Japan Airlines, sporting goods maker Mizuno Corp., Internet service provider Biglobe, convenience store chain FamilyMart, and Nihon McDonald's.

The Shikoku Island League Plus is part of the Japan Independent Baseball League Organization (which also includes the Baseball Challenge League).

== League play ==
Originally, each team played 90 games per season: 45 at home and 45 away. With the 2008 expansion, each team's schedule changed to 80 games a year, 40 at home and 40 away, so the season consists of 240 games. Teams attempt to schedule games for Fridays, Saturdays, and Sundays. Friday games are night games. (Until the 2011 season, the Kōchi Fighting Dogs lacked the necessary lighting equipment and had to play all their home games during the day.)

The Shikoku Island League uses designated hitters.

One technique the league uses to strengthen its ties to the locales where it plays is to have those players who come from Shikoku play for their home teams. Even if they are not regulars, they often appear as designated hitters, pinch hitters, relief pitchers, and substitutes.

== History ==
The league was originally known as the Shikoku Island League. It was founded by former Nippon Professional Baseball star Hiromichi Ishige under the corporate ownership of IBLJ Inc. (an abbreviation of "Independent Baseball League of Japan"). The first game in the league took place on April 29, 2005. On November 10, 2005, the Kochi Fighting Dogs won the first league championship.

The league initially held all the rights to the teams, leadership and players, but in 2006 established separate corporations for the teams.

On December 1, 2007, the league expanded to include the Fukuoka Red Warblers and the Nagasaki Saints; as the Saints were based in Kyūshū, the league changed its name accordingly, to the Shikoku-Kyūshū Island League (四国・九州アイランドリーグ, Shikoku-Kyūshū Airando Rīgu).

The Red Warblers only lasted through the 2009 season. and a new team was added, the Mie Three Arrows. The Saints withdrew from the league following the 2010 season, while the Three Arrows folded after the 2011 season.

The Japan Independent Baseball League Organization was formed during the summer of 2014.

In June 2015, an all-star team of players of the Shikoku Island League played against all the teams from the independent Can-Am League in North America. They finished with a record of 6–10. An all-star team returned for the 2016 Can-Am League season, finishing with a record of 8–12.

== Teams ==
Each team has 22 players, two coaches, and one manager.

Team	Founded	City	Stadium	Team color
Ehime Mandarin Pirates	2005	Ehime Prefecture	Botchan Stadium	
Kagawa Olive Guyners	2005	Kagawa Prefecture	Rexxam Stadium	
Kōchi Fighting Dogs	2005	Kōchi Prefecture	Kochi Municipal Baseball Stadium (in Japanese)	
Tokushima Indigo Socks	2005	Tokushima Prefecture	JA Bank Tokushima Stadium (in Japanese)	

=== Former Teams ===
Team	Founded	City
Fukuoka Red Warblers	2008	Fukuoka Prefecture
Mie Three Arrows	2009	Mie Prefecture
Nagasaki Saints	2008	Nagasaki Prefecture

== League statistics ==
Team	League Champion	Half-season Champion
Kagawa Olive Guyners	7	13
Kochi Fighting Dogs	3	4
Tokushima Indigo Socks	7	12
Ehime Mandarin Pirates	4	8
Nagasaki Saints	0	1
Fukuoka Red Warblers	0	0
Mie Three Arrows	0	0

== Seasons ==
Year	# of Teams	First Half	Second Half	Full Season
2005	4	None	None	Kochi Fighting Dogs
2006	4	Kochi Fighting Dogs	Kagawa Olive Guyners	Kagawa Olive Guyners
2007	4	Kagawa Olive Guyners	Kagawa Olive Guyners	Kagawa Olive Guyners (2)
2008	6	Kagawa Olive Guyners	Ehime Mandarin Pirates	Kagawa Olive Guyners (3)
2009	6	Nagasaki Saints	Kochi Fighting Dogs	Kochi Fighting Dogs (2)
2010	5	Kagawa Olive Guyners	Kagawa Olive Guyners	Kagawa Olive Guyners (4)
2011	5	Tokushima Indigo Socks	Kagawa Olive Guyners	Tokushima Indigo Socks
2012	4	Kagawa Olive Guyners	Ehime Mandarin Pirates	Kagawa Olive Guyners (5)
2013	4	Kagawa Olive Guyners	Tokushima Indigo Socks	Tokushima Indigo Socks (2)
2014	4	Tokushima Indigo Socks	Tokushima Indigo Socks	Tokushima Indigo Socks (3)
2015	4	Kagawa Olive Guyners	Ehime Mandarin Pirates	Ehime Mandarin Pirates
2016	4	Ehime Mandarin Pirates	Ehime Mandarin Pirates	Ehime Mandarin Pirates (2)
2017	4	Tokushima Indigo Socks	Kagawa Olive Guyners	Tokushima Indigo Socks (4)
2018	4	Kagawa Olive Guyners	Ehime Mandarin Pirates	Kagawa Olive Guyners (6)
2019	4	Ehime Mandarin Pirates	Tokushima Indigo Socks	Tokushima Mandarin Socks (5)
2020	4	None	None	Tokushima Indigo Socks (6)
2021	4	Kagawa Olive Guyners	Kochi Fighting Dogs	Kagawa Olive Guyners (7)
2022	4	Kochi Fighting Dogs	Tokushima Indigo Socks	Kochi Fighting Dogs (3)
2023	4	Tokushima Indigo Socks	Tokushima Indigo Socks	Tokushima Indigo Socks (7)
2024	4	Tokushima Indigo Socks	Tokushima Indigo Socks	Ehime Mandarin Pirates (3)
2025	4	Tokushima Indigo Socks	Ehime Mandarin Pirates	Ehime Mandarin Pirates (4)
