= 2004 Japan Series =

Japanese baseball championship series

Team (Wins)	Managers	Season
Saitama Seibu Lions (4)	Tsutomu Itoh	74–58–1 (.560), 4½ GB
Chunichi Dragons (3)	Hiromitsu Ochiai	79–56–3 (.583), 7½ GA
- Dates: October 16–25
- MVP: Takashi Ishii (Seibu)
- FSA: Kazuki Inoue (Chunichi)

Broadcast
- Television: CBC (Game1, 7, JNN); Tokai TV and Fuji TV (Game 2, 6, FNN); TV Asahi (Game 3, 4, ANN); TBS (Game 5, JNN)

The 2004 Japan Series was the championship series of Nippon Professional Baseball for the 2004 season. The 55th edition of the Series, it was a best-of-seven playoff that matched the Pacific League playoffs winner Seibu Lions against the Central League champion Chunichi Dragons. The series began on October 16 and ended on October 25 with the Lions defeating the Dragons in five games to win their first championship since 1992.

== Background ==
=== Seibu Lions ===
After an embarrassing sweep at the hands of the Yomiuri Giants in the 2002 Japan Series and losing out on the Pacific League pennant to the Fukuoka Daiei Hawks in 2003, the Lions were back in the Japan Series in 2004 thanks in no small part to the healthy arm of Daisuke Matsuzaka. Also helping the cause offensively was Venezuelan import Alex Cabrera, who hit a record-tying 55 home runs in 2002. Seibu advanced to the Series based on their performance in the newly created playoff system, instituted by the Pacific League that matched the second-place team against the third-place team for the right to play the regular season champion in the second and final stage (previously, the league had a split-season playoff between the champions of the first-half and second-half season from 1973 to 1982). In the 2004 Pacific League Playoffs, the second-place Lions defeated the Hokkaido Nippon-Ham Fighters in a series that went the full three games before defeating the Fukuoka Daiei Hawks in a series that went the full five games to advance to the Japan Series. Seibu had not won the Japan Series since 1992.

=== Chunichi Dragons ===
Unlike the Lions, the Dragons had not had any success in winning the Japan Series since 1954, and this was their first appearance in the series since 1999, when they lost in 5 games to the Hawks. The Dragons pitching staff was led by Kenshin Kawakami and Masahiro Yamamoto, while Hitoki Iwase anchored the back of the bullpen. Offensively, the Dragons were led by Alex Ochoa and Kosuke Fukudome. In the middle of the infield, the Dragons were led by the amazing double-play tandem of Hirokazu Ibata and Masahiro Araki.

== Summary ==
PL Seibu Lions (4) vs. CL Chunichi Dragons (3)

Game	Date	Score	Location	Time	Attendance
1	October 16	Seibu Lions – 2, Chunichi Dragons – 0	Nagoya Dome	3:50	37,909
2	October 17	Seibu Lions – 6, Chunichi Dragons – 11	Nagoya Dome	3:51	37,969
3	October 19	Chunichi Dragons – 8, Seibu Lions – 10	Seibu Dome	4:00	23,910
4	OCtober 21	Chunichi Dragons – 8, Seibu Lions – 2	Seibu Dome	4:06	29,073
5	October 22	Chunichi Dragons – 6, Seibu Lions – 1	Seibu Dome	3:29	31,526
6	October 24	Chunichi Dragons – 2, Seibu Lions – 4	Nagoya Dome	4:00	38,120
7	October 25	Chunichi Dragons – 2, Seibu Lions – 7	Nagoya Dome	3:37	38,050

== Game summaries ==
=== Game 1 ===
Saturday, October 16, 2004, 6:20 pm (JST) at Nagoya Dome in Nagoya, Aichi Prefecture
Team	1	2	3	4	5	6	7	8	9	R	H	E
Seibu	0	0	0	1	1	0	0	0	0	2	7	0
Chunichi	0	0	0	0	0	0	0	0	0	0	2	1
WP: Takashi Ishii (1-0) LP: Kenshin Kawakami (0-1) Sv: Kiyoshi Toyoda (1); Home runs: SEI: Kazuhiro Wada (1); CHU: None

The first Japan Series game held in Nagoya Dome since Game 5 of the 1999 Japan Series turned out to be quite the close game, but the end result was the same: the Dragons were defeated by great pitching, this time from unheralded Takashi Ishii, who only won four games in the regular season. Chunichi had their ace on the mound in Kenshin Kawakami, who bounced back nicely from an injury-plagued 2003 season.

The two teams matched zeroes for the first three innings as Ishii struck out four and Kawakami ducked in and out of trouble. Jose Fernández hit a two-out single in the first but was stranded there, and Kawakami left Kazuhiro Wada at third after he hit a leadoff triple, but Hiroyuki Nakajima and Kosuke Noda both grounded out, Hiroyuki Takagi drew an intentional walk to get to the pitcher Ishii, who struck out.

Wada would make sure he crossed the plate in his next at-bat. The fourth inning would also see the first run of the series on a towering home run to left field to give the Lions a 1-0 lead. That lead would be doubled in the next inning as Shogo Akada drove in Tomoaki Satoh with a single after Satoh doubled to lead off the inning.

The 2-0 lead would be enough for the Seibu pitching staff, as Ishii would work seven shutout innings, giving up just two hits and striking out six. Kiyoshi Toyoda worked a perfect 9th for the Lions to preserve the win. The shutout was also the third time in the last four home Japan Series games that Chunichi had been shut out, and it was the fourth time out of the last six overall.

=== Game 2 ===
Sunday, October 17, 2004, 6:23 pm (JST) at Nagoya Dome in Nagoya, Aichi Prefecture
Team	1	2	3	4	5	6	7	8	9	R	H	E
Seibu	2	0	0	0	3	0	1	0	0	6	11	0
Chunichi	0	0	3	0	0	0	5	3	X	11	14	0
WP: Marc Valdes (1-0) LP: Daisuke Matsuzaka (0-1); Home runs: SEI: Jose Fernández (1), Kazuhiro Wada (2); CHU: Kazuyoshi Tatsunami (1)

This would be the first of a few wild games in this series. The Dragons finally ended their home playoff futility by winning their first playoff game at Nagoya Dome at the expense of Lions ace Matsuzaka. However, the game did not start well for the Dragons.

Pitching in his third Japan Series, wily veteran screwballer Masa Yamamoto was lit up for two runs in the first inning off the bat of Fernandez, who also drove in Satoh who led off the game with a single. The quick 2-0 lead was enough for Matsuzaka for the first two innings, but he ran into his first bit of trouble in the 3rd.

Shogo Mori led off the inning with a single, and Yamamoto reached on a dropped third strike. Matsuzaka got himself into further trouble when he hit Masahiro Araki with a pitch to load the bases with nobody out. Hirokazu Ibata got a hit but saw Mori get gunned down at home. With the rally in trouble after Tatsunami grounded out, Alex Ochoa tied the game up with a two-run single to right. Matsuzaka made matters worse by plunking his second batter of the inning, this time Masahiko Morino, to re-load the bases. Finally, light-hitting catcher Motonobu Tanishige walked to force another run home and give Chunichi their first-ever lead at Nagoya Dome in the Japan series, 3-2.

Both Yamamoto and Matsuzaka would regain their composure in the following innings. Yamamoto struck out five batters between the 2nd and the 5th, and Dice-K only gave up one hit from the 4th to the 6th, striking out five in the process.

Seibu would chase Yamamoto and regain the lead in the 5th with a three-run barrage of their own. Takagi led the inning off with a single, then Satoh and Akada bot hit doubles to vault Seibu into the lead, 4-3. Eiji Ochiai came in to replace Yamamoto for the righty-on-righty matchup to Fernandez. After a sacrifice by Fernandez, the dangerous Cabrera was intentionally walked. Wada followed up the walk with a double that gave the Lions the 5-3 lead. Wada would double the Seibu advantage in the 7th with his second home run of the series, a shot that gave Seibu a seemingly safe 6-3 lead.

Then, Matsuzaka imploded. He was lit up for five runs in the 7th inning, with the rally having been started by pinch-hitter Takayuki Ohnishi. Araki lined out to right, but the rally truly began with Ibata's single to center. Tatsunami followed it up with three of his four RBIs on the day, as he hit his first home run of the series to right field, a three-run blast that tied the game at 6-6.

However, the Dragons weren't done. Ochoa drew a walk and Morino was plunked for the second time on the day, and Tanishige got in on the fun by singling home Ochoa to give the Dragons the 7-6 lead. Pinch-hitter Mitsunobu Takahashi then singled home another run to finish Matsuzaka's day and give Chunichi an 8-6 lead.

The Dragons would add three more in the 9th off Shinji Mori. Ibata collected his fourth hit of the day, stole second, and was driven home by Tatsunami. After Ochoa reached again, an RBI triple and another Tanishige RBI single ended the scoring with an 11-6 win for the Dragons. With the series going back to Seibu Dome for the next three, the Dragons were tied. They had beaten Seibu's best in Matsuzaka. Could they keep the ball rolling and win their first Japan Series since 1954?

=== Game 3 ===
Tuesday, October 19, 2004, 6:22 pm (JST) at Seibu Dome, Tokorozawa, Saitama
Team	1	2	3	4	5	6	7	8	9	R	H	E
Chunichi	0	0	0	0	0	5	1	2	0	8	11	0
Seibu	0	0	0	3	1	0	6	0	X	10	9	1
WP: Koji Ohnuma (1-0) LP: Shinya Okamoto (0-1); Home runs: CHU: Motonobu Tanishige (1), Omar Linares (1); SEI: Alex Cabrera (1, 2), Hiroyuki Nakajima (1)

In what was one of the wildest games in Japan Series history, Game 3 was also the first time in Japan Series history that two grand slams were hit in the same game. Kazuyuki Hoashi faced off against Domingo Guzmán for the starting pitching matchup. The first three innings were a scoreless deadlock, with Chunichi having only one hit to their credit, and Seibu having no hits.

The fourth inning saw the first runs of the game, as the potent Seibu bats once again came alive, and the feared slugger Alex Cabrera finally came to life himself. Satoh and Fernandez both singled their way on, and then Cabrera launched his first home run of the series to give Seibu the 3-0 lead.

Hoashi would make it stand up, and he got another run in support of him in the 4th when young shortstop Hiroyuki Nakajima clubbed his first home run of the series. However, he ran into trouble in the 6th: trouble that would give the Dragons a 5-4 lead. The rally started when Nakajima muffed a ground ball. After Hoashi got the first out of the inning, Tatsunami and Ochoa both singled their way on to load the bases, and Takahashi drew a walk to force in one run. Hoashi was taken out and replaced by Shuichiro Osada, who faced Tanishige as his first batter. Tanishige took a 3-1 inside fastball and crushed it down the line in left for his first career grand slam. All of a sudden, the Lions were trailing 5-4.

With Guzman out of the game after five innings, Shinya Okamoto took over. He preserved the Dragons lead, and his teammates got him another run in the 6th when Ochoa got a bases-loaded RBI single to give the Dragons a 6-4 lead. However, the 7th truly was the lucky inning for the Lions, as Okamoto suffered an implosion of his own, similar to Matsuzaka's in the previous game.

With one out, Nakajima singled his way on, Yoshihito Ishii walked, and Takagi was hit by a pitch. Satoh doubled Nakajima and Ishii in to tie the game up at 6. At this point, conventional wisdom would say that Okamoto should have been relieved, but he was allowed to continue. Akada grounded out, and Fernandez walked. With two down, the game was hanging in the balance as Okamoto pitched to Cabrera, even though it was only the 7th inning. Cabrera responded with a towering home run to left on a 1-1 pitch that was hit out of Seibu Dome. It was Cabrera's second home run of the day, and it was also the second grand slam of the day in total. The slam gave Seibu a 10-6 lead going into the 8th.

Chunichi would not go quietly though. Against Koji Ohnuma, Omar Linares got in on the home run derby by leading off with a home run to the back screen in center to pull the Dragons to within 10-7. Morino followed it up with a double, and he came around to score on two groundouts for a 10-8 score. However, Toyoda would not let the Dragons get any closer in the 9th, as he stuck out two batters in the 9th to record the save and give Seibu a 2-1 series lead.

=== Game 4 ===
Thursday, October 21, 2004, 6:21 pm (JST) at Seibu Dome, Tokorozawa, Saitama
Team	1	2	3	4	5	6	7	8	9	R	H	E
Chunichi	0	1	0	4	2	1	0	0	0	8	11	0
Seibu	0	0	0	3	1	0	1	1	0	2	11	1
WP: Daisuke Yamai (1-0) LP: Chang Chih-chia (0-1); Home runs: CHU: Omar Linares (2), Alex Ochoa (1), Kazuki Inoue (1); SEI: Hiroyuki Nakajima (2)

The game was delayed a day.

=== Game 5 ===
Friday, October 22, 2004, 6:21 pm (JST) at Seibu Dome, Tokorozawa, Saitama
Team	1	2	3	4	5	6	7	8	9	R	H	E
Chunichi	0	0	1	2	0	0	0	0	3	6	6	0
Seibu	0	0	0	0	0	1	0	0	0	1	6	0
WP: Kenshin Kawakami (1-1) LP: Fumiya Nishiguchi (0-1); Home runs: CHU: Kazuyoshi Tatsunami (2), Alex Ochoa (2); SEI: None

=== Game 6 ===
Sunday, October 24, 2004, 6:23 pm (JST) at Nagoya Dome in Nagoya, Aichi Prefecture
Team	1	2	3	4	5	6	7	8	9	R	H	E
Seibu	1	0	0	4	0	2	0	1	0	4	11	0
Chunichi	0	1	0	1	0	0	0	0	0	2	9	0
WP: Daisuke Matsuzaka (1-1) LP: Masa Yamamoto (0-1) Sv: Kiyoshi Toyoda (2); Home runs: SEI: Kazuhiro Wada (3, 4); CHU: None

=== Game 7 ===
Monday, October 25, 2004, 6:22 pm (JST) at Nagoya Dome in Nagoya, Aichi Prefecture
Team	1	2	3	4	5	6	7	8	9	R	H	E
Seibu	0	0	5	0	0	1	1	0	0	7	13	0
Chunichi	0	0	0	0	0	0	0	0	2	2	7	0
WP: Takashi Ishii (2-0) LP: Domingo Guzmán (0-1); Home runs: SEI: Alex Cabrera (3), Hiroshi Hirao (1); CHU: None

Takashi Ishii was matched up against Domingo Guzmán. The Lions rode a five-run fifth inning (encapsulated with a towering two-run home run from Alex Cabrera) while Ishii threw six innings of shut-out ball and the Dragons had to use six different pitchers. Kiyoshi Toyoda got Shogo Mori as the last batter of the series when he hit into a double play.

== See also ==
- 2004 World Series
