= 2004 Pacific League Playoffs =

Japanese baseball series

First stage
Team (Wins)		Manager	Season
Seibu Lions (2)		Tsutomu Ito	74–58–1 (.560), 4.5 GB
Hokkaido Nippon-Ham Fighters (1)		Trey Hillman	66–65–2 (.504), 12 GB
- Dates: October 1–3

Second stage
Team (Wins)		Manager	Season
Seibu Lions (3)		Tsutomu Ito	74–58–1 (.560), 4.5 GB
Fukuoka Daiei Hawks (2)		Sadaharu Oh	77–52–4 (.594), 4.5 GA
- Dates: October 6–11

The 2004 Pacific League Playoffs was a set of consecutive playoff series for the Pacific League of Nippon Professional Baseball (NPB) in the 2004 season. It began on October 1 and ended on October 11, with the top-three finishers of the PL participating in two series of games, with the first stage being a best-of-three series and the final stage being a best-of-five series. They were:

- (2) Seibu Lions (74–58–1) vs. (3) Hokkaido Nippon-Ham Fighters (66–65–2): Lions win series, 2–1.
- (1) Fukuoka Daiei Hawks (77–52) vs. (2) Seibu Lions: Lions win series, 3–2.

With the victory against the Hawks, the Lions advanced to the Japan Series. The Pacific League would be the only league with a playoff until 2007, which saw both the Central and Pacific have their top three teams compete in a playoff that is referred to as the Climax Series.

== First stage ==
=== Summary ===
Seibu Lions won the series, 2–1.

Game	Date	Score	Location	Time	Attendance
1	October 1	Hokkaido Nippon-Ham Fighters – 7, Seibu Lions – 10	Seibu Dome	3:30	30,000
2	October 2	Hokkaido Nippon-Ham Fighters – 5, Seibu Lions – 4	Seibu Dome	3:53	45,000
3	October 3	Hokkaido Nippon-Ham Fighters – 5, Seibu Lions – 6	Seibu Dome	4:31	38,000

=== Game 1 ===
Friday, October 1, 2004, 6:00 pm (JST) at Seibu Dome in Tokorozawa, Saitama Prefecture
Team	1	2	3	4	5	6	7	8	9	R
Nippon-Ham	0	0	0	3	0	0	1	3	0	7
Seibu	0	0	3	0	0	1	6	0	X	3
WP: Daisuke Matsuzaka (1–0) LP: Satoru Kanemura (0–1) Sv: Kiyoshi Toyoda (1); Home runs: NIP: Michihiro Ogasawara (1), Fernando Seguignol (1); SEI: José Fernández 2 (2), Tomoaki Satoh (1), Toru Hosokawa (1); Attendance: 30,000

=== Game 2 ===
Saturday, October 2, 2004, 1:30 pm (JST) at Seibu Dome in Tokorozawa, Saitama Prefecture
Team	1	2	3	4	5	6	7	8	9	R
Nippon-Ham	1	0	0	0	0	4	0	0	0	5
Seibu	0	0	1	0	0	0	0	0	3	4
WP: Carlos Mirabal (1–0) LP: Chang Chih-chia (0–1) Sv: Yukiya Yokoyama (1); Home runs: NIP: Michihiro Ogasawara (2); SEI: None; Attendance: 45,000

=== Game 3 ===
Sunday, October 3, 2004, 1:00 pm (JST) at Seibu Dome in Tokorozawa, Saitama Prefecture
Team	1	2	3	4	5	6	7	8	9	R
Nippon-Ham	3	0	0	0	0	0	0	0	2	5
Seibu	0	0	4	1	0	0	0	0	1X	6
WP: Kiyoshi Toyoda (1–0) LP: Yukiya Yokoyama (0–1); Home runs: NIP: Fernando Seguignol (2), Kuniyuki Kimoto (1); SEI: Alex Cabrera (1), Kazuhiro Wada (1); Attendance: 38,000

== Second stage ==
=== Summary ===
Seibu Lions won the series, 3–2.

Game	Date	Score	Location	Time	Attendance
1	October 6	Seibu Lions – 3, Fukuoka Daiei Hawks – 9	Fukuoka Dome	3:05	47,000
2	October 7	Seibu Lions – 11, Fukuoka Daiei Hawks – 1	Fukuoka Dome	3:24	47,000
3	October 9	Seibu Lions – 6, Fukuoka Daiei Hawks – 5	Fukuoka Dome	4:00	48,000
4	October 10	Seibu Lions – 1, Fukuoka Daiei Hawks – 4	Fukuoka Dome	3:22	48,000
5	October 11	Seibu Lions – 4, Fukuoka Daiei Hawks – 3 (10)	Fukuoka Dome	4:14	47,000

=== Game 1 ===
Wednesday, October 6, 2004, 6:00 pm (JST) at Fukuoka Dome in Fukuoka, Fukuoka Prefecture
Team	1	2	3	4	5	6	7	8	9	R
Seibu	0	0	0	0	0	1	0	0	2	3
Daiei	2	0	1	0	2	0	3	1	X	9
WP: Nagisa Arakaki (1–0) LP: Takashi Ishii (0–1); Home runs: SEI: Alex Cabrera (1); DAI: Kenji Johjima (1), Tadahito Iguchi (1), Nobuhiko Matsunaka (1), Julio Zuleta (1); Attendance: 47,000

=== Game 2 ===
Thursday, October 7, 2004, 6:00 pm (JST) at Fukuoka Dome in Fukuoka, Fukuoka Prefecture
Team	1	2	3	4	5	6	7	8	9	R
Seibu	2	3	0	0	0	4	2	0	2	11
Daiei	0	0	0	0	0	1	0	0	0	1
WP: Daisuke Matsuzaka (1–0) LP: Tsuyoshi Wada (0–1); Home runs: SEI: Kazuhiro Wada (1), Hiroyuki Takagi (1); DAI: None; Attendance: 47,000

=== Game 3 ===
Saturday, October 9, 2004, 6:00 pm (JST) at Fukuoka Dome in Fukuoka, Fukuoka Prefecture
Team	1	2	3	4	5	6	7	8	9	R
Seibu	2	1	0	0	1	2	0	0	0	6
Daiei	0	0	0	4	1	0	0	0	0	5
WP: Shuichiro Osada (1–0) LP: Kazumi Saito (0–1) Sv: Kiyoshi Toyoda (1); Home runs: SEI: José Fernández 2 (2), Hiroyuki Nakajima (1), Kosuke Noda (1); DAI: Tadahito Iguchi (2), Kenji Johjima (2); Attendance: 48,000

=== Game 4 ===
Sunday, October 10, 2004, 6:00 pm (JST) at Fukuoka Dome in Fukuoka, Fukuoka Prefecture
Team	1	2	3	4	5	6	7	8	9	R
Seibu	0	0	0	0	0	0	1	0	0	1
Daiei	0	0	0	3	0	1	0	0	X	4
WP: Shinji Kurano (1–0) LP: Kazuyuki Hoashi (0–1) Sv: Koji Mise (1); Home runs: SEI: Kazuhiro Wada (2); DAI: Munenori Kawasaki (1); Attendance: 48,000

=== Game 5 ===
Monday, October 11, 2004, 6:00 pm (JST) at Fukuoka Dome in Fukuoka, Fukuoka Prefecture
Team	1	2	3	4	5	6	7	8	9	10	R
Seibu	0	0	0	0	0	3	0	0	0	1	4
Daiei	0	0	0	1	0	0	0	1	1	0	3
WP: Kiyoshi Toyoda (1–0) LP: Koji Mise (0–1) Sv: Takashi Ishii (1); Home runs: SEI: None; DAI: Kenji Johjima (3), Tadahito Iguchi (3); Attendance: 47,000
