= Kazuhiro Wada =

Japanese baseball player

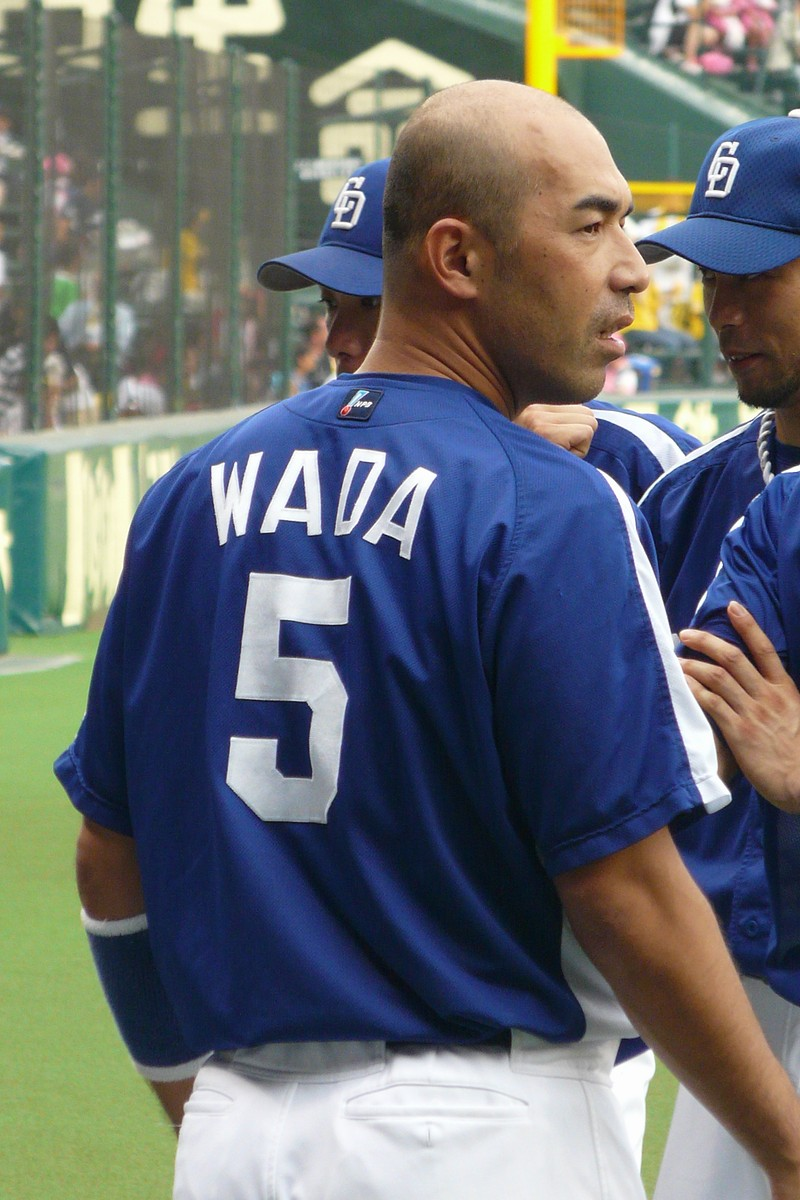
- Wada with the Chunichi Dragons
- Outfielder / Coach
- Born: June 19, 1972 (age 54); Gifu, Gifu, Japan
- Batted: Right Threw: Right

NPB debut
- April 30, 1997, for the Seibu Lions

Last NPB appearance
- September 24, 2015, for the Chunichi Dragons

NPB statistics
- Batting average: .303
- Hits: 2,050
- Home runs: 319
- Runs batted in: 1,081
- Stats at Baseball Reference

Teams
- As player: Seibu Lions (1997–2007); Chunichi Dragons (2008–2015); As coach: Chunichi Dragons (2023–2024)

Career highlights and awards
- Japan Series Champion (2004); Central League MVP (2010); Pacific League Batting Champion (2005); 2010 CLCS MVP; 6× Best Nine Award (2002–2006, 2010); 4× Pacific League Champion (1997, 1998, 2002, 2004); 2× Central League Champion (2010, 2011); 6× NPB All-Star (2003–2005, 2008, 2010, 2012); 2000 professional hits
Medals
Representing Japan
Men's baseball
Olympic Games
Bronze medal – third place	2004 Athens	Team
World Baseball Classic
Gold medal – first place	2006 San Diego	Team

Kazuhiro Wada (和田 一浩, Wada Kazuhiro; born June 19, 1972) is a retired Japanese professional baseball player. He played mostly as an outfielder for the Chunichi Dragons and the Seibu Lions of the Nippon Professional Baseball league in a career spanning 18 years. Following retirement in 2015, he has become a color commentator for Dragons broadcasts for the NHK.

== Early career ==
Playing for Tohoku Fukushi University, Wada was MVP of the Sendai Big Six University League as a senior and won the batting title. He hit .429 for Kobe Seiko in the industrial leagues, then in 1996 was drafted in the fourth round of the Japanese draft by the Seibu Lions.

== Professional career ==
=== Seibu Lions ===
He hit .190 in 1997 when he first played for Seibu and was 0/1 in the 1997 Japan Series. In 1998, Wada hit .333 in 36 games for Seibu and split his time between catching and the outfield. He went 0/2 in the 1998 Japan Series. In 1999, he batted .271 while again seeing limited time behind the plate, with Tsutomu Ito starting.

In 1998, Wada began playing semiregularly as an outfielder, batting .306, the same average he recorded the next year. He still not yet an everyday player. In 2002, Wada finally became a starter and responded by batting .319 with 33 homers. Playing left field and DH, he made the Best Nine as the top designated hitter in the Pacific League. He finished third in slugging behind teammates Alex Cabrera and Kazuo Matsui. His Japan Series woes continued with a miserable 0/15 in the 2002 Japan Series, as Seibu got swept by the Yomiuri Giants.

Wada did even better in 2003, hitting .346 (.379 with runners in scoring position), homering 30 times, scoring 87 runs and driving in 89. He made his first All-Star team and was on the Best Nine as an outfielder alongside Yoshitomo Tani and Tuffy Rhodes. Wada finished third in the Pacific League in average (behind Michihiro Ogasawara and Tani) and slugging (behind Cabera and Ogasawara). He was fourth in OBP behind Ogasawara, Tadahito Iguchi and Nobuhiko Matsunaka.

2004 was an eventful year for Wada. He hit .320 (.375 with RISP), homered 30 times and drove in 89 despite missing time for the 2004 Olympics. For the bronze medal-winning Japanese club in the Olympics, he hit .333 and slugged .636. Hitting cleanup or fifth for Seibu, he was honored again as an All-Star and Best Nine. In the 2004 Japan Series, he finally broke his postseason struggles in a big way by batting .310 with four homers in Seibu's victory over the Chunichi Dragons. Wada broke a 54-year-old record for most extra-base hits in a Japan Series with eight, breaking Isao Harimoto's record of 7 in the 1950 Japan Series. His 26 total bases were a Japan Series record, breaking Yasumitsu Toyoda's 46-year-old record of 25; he tied the record with four homers in a series and his two homers in game six helped Seibu to a 4-2 victory to tie the series at three. Takashi Ishii beat him out for Series MVP honors, though.

Wada continued his dazzling pace in 2005, batting .322, though his 27 homers were his lowest total in four years. He made his fourth straight All-Star contingent. He edged Julio Zuleta (.319) and Matsunaka (.315) for the first Pacific League batting title won by a right-handed hitter since Hatsuhiko Tsuji in 1993. He was fourth in slugging, third in OBP, tied for third in runs (80), first in hits (153), second in doubles (32).

Wada was on the winning Japanese club in the 2006 World Baseball Classic and went 0 of 2 with one strikeout in two games as the backup left fielder to Hitoshi Tamura. Wada hit .298 in 2006 and finished third in the PL with 95 RBI, second to Fernando Seguignol with 34 doubles, eighth with 144 hits, seventh with 239 total bases, tied for seventh with 72 runs, second with 78 walks (trailing only Matsunaka). He was fourth in OBP and eighth in slugging. His home run total continued to fall, down to 19, but still tied for seventh in the PL.

He re-signed for Seibu for ¥275 million plus incentives.

=== Chunichi Dragons ===
At the end of the 2007 season, Wada opted for free agency and joined boyhood club and reigning Japan Series champions, the Chunichi Dragons in a 3-year, ¥840 million deal to replace MLB bound right-fielder, Kosuke Fukudome.

== Personal ==
Wada's hobbies are fishing, pachinko and mah jong.

== See also ==
- List of Nippon Professional Baseball players with 1,000 runs batted in
- List of Nippon Professional Baseball career hits leaders

== Sources ==
- This is a shortened version of the Baseball-Reference.com Bullpen article Kazuhiro Wada, accessed February 21, 2007. The Bullpen is a wiki, and its content is available under the GNU Free Documentation License.
