= Yasuo Nagaike =

Japanese baseball player and coach (born 1973)

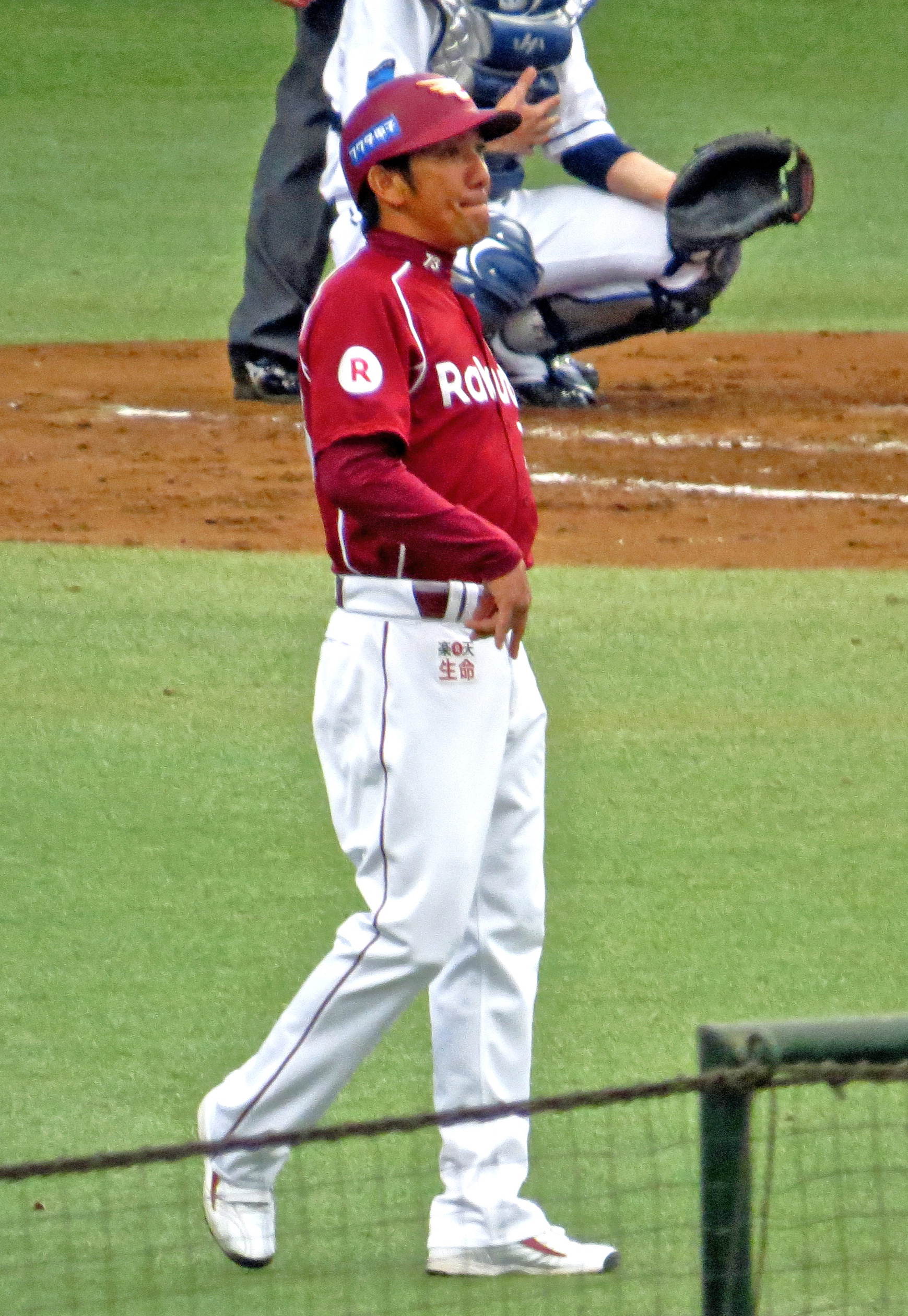
- Infielder/Coach
- Born: October 5, 1973 (age 52); Kasuga, Fukuoka, Japan
- Batted: Right Threw: Right

NPB debut
- July 18, 1993, for the Yokohama BayStars

Last NPB appearance
- September 25, 2005, for the Tohoku Rakuten Golden Eagles

NPB statistics
- Batting average: .217
- Hits: 79
- Home runs: 3
- RBIs: 27

Teams
- As player: Yokohama Taiyō Whales/Yokohama BayStars (1992–1997); Yomiuri Giants (1998–2002); Osaka Kintetsu Buffaloes (2003–2004); Tohoku Rakuten Golden Eagles (2005–2006); As coach: Tohoku Rakuten Golden Eagles (2015); Yokohama DeNA BayStars (2016–2023)

Yasuo Nagaike (永池 恭男, Nagaike Yasuo; born October 5, 1973 in Kasuga, Fukuoka, Japan) is a former professional Japanese baseball player.
