= 2004 Fukuoka Daiei Hawks season =

2004 Fukuoka Daiei Hawks
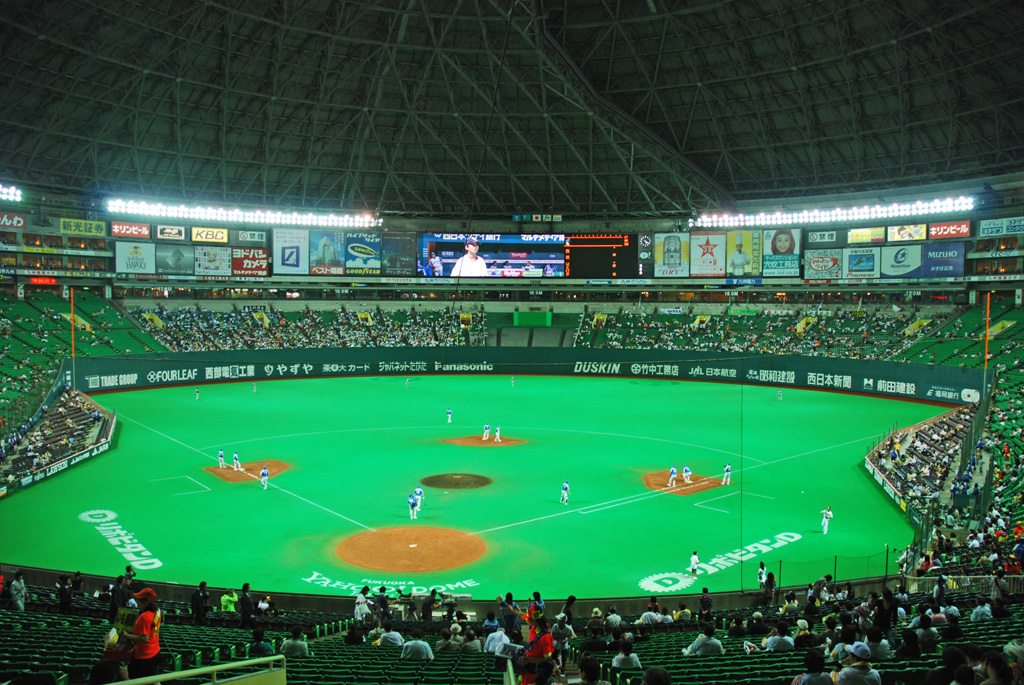
- Fukuoka Daiei Hawks season 2004
- League: Pacific League
- Ballpark: Fukuoka Dome
- Record: 77-52-4 (.594)
- League place: 1st
- Parent company: Daiei
- Manager: Sadaharu Oh

The 2004 Fukuoka Daiei Hawks season was the 67th season of the franchise in Nippon Professional Baseball, their 11th season in Fukuoka Dome, and their 15th and final season under Daiei, because SoftBank Group took over the Hawks' ownership the following season and rebrand them as the Fukuoka SoftBank Hawks. This also is the team's 9th season under manager Sadaharu Oh.

== Regular Season and postseason ==
The Hawks finished in first, going 77-52-4, for a .594 winning percentage. The Hawks eventually got eliminated by the Seibu Lions in the second stage of the Pacific League playoffs.

Pacific League	G	W	L	T	Pct.	GB
Fukuoka Daiei Hawks	133	77	52	4	.594	—
Seibu Lions	133	74	58	1	.560	4.5
Hokkaido Nippon-Ham Fighters	133	66	65	2	.504	12.0
Chiba Lotte Marines	133	65	65	3	.500	12.5
Osaka Kintetsu Buffaloes	133	61	70	2	.466	17.0
Orix BlueWave	133	49	72	2	.376	29.0

Note: A players' strike in September over the merger of the Orix BlueWave and Osaka Kintetsu Buffaloes shortened the season by two games.
