= Takashi Ishii =

Takashi Ishii is the name of

- Takashi Ishii (film director) (石井隆, born 1946), Japanese film director, screenwriter and manga artist
- Takashi Ishii (runner) (石井隆士, born 1954), Japanese runner and medalist in the 1981 Asian Athletics Championships
- Takashi Ishii (baseball) (石井貴, born 1971), Japanese baseball pitcher and coach
