= Shinya Nakayama =

Japanese baseball player

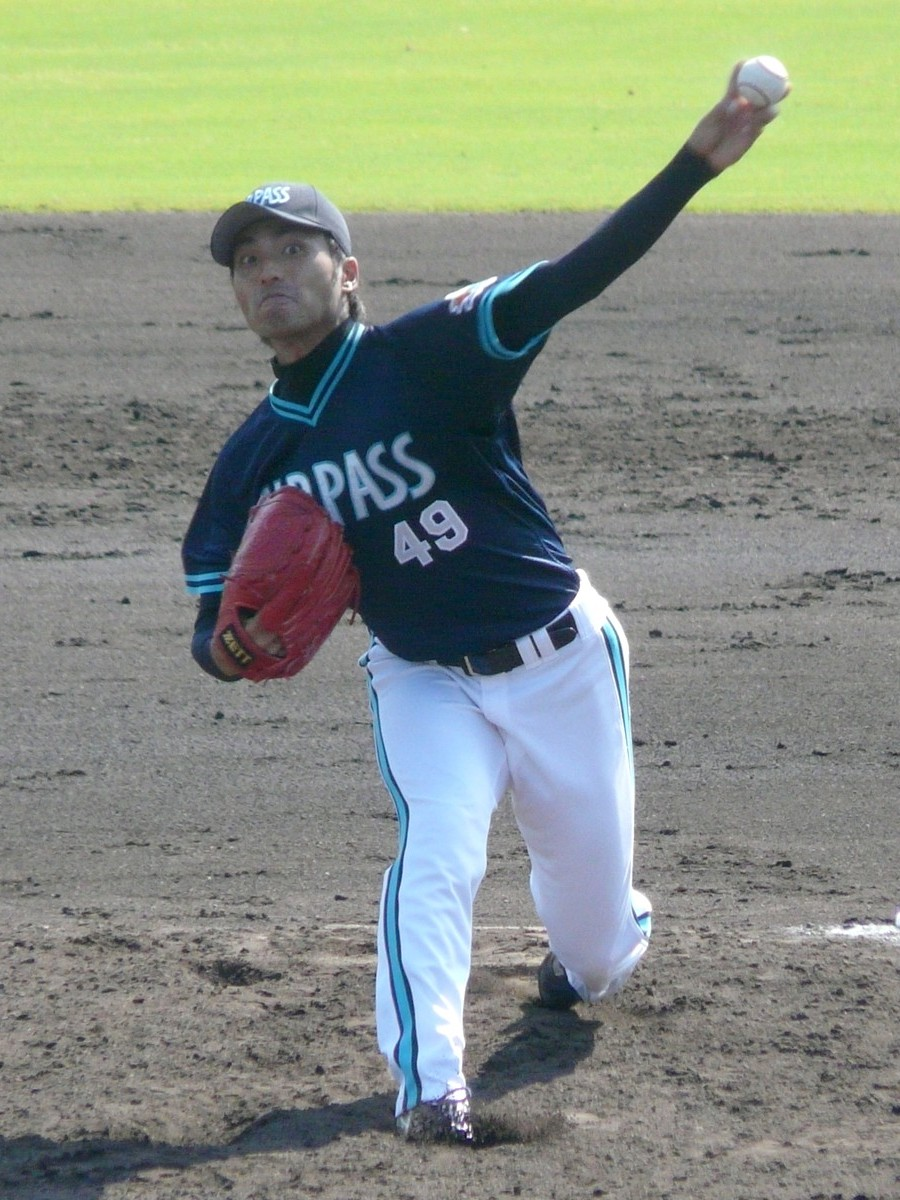
- Nakayama with the Orix Surpass
- Pitcher
- Born: February 22, 1982 (age 44); Gunma, Japan
- Bats: Left Throws: Left

NPB debut
- April 19, 2006, for the Orix Buffaloes

NPB statistics (through 2015 season)
- Win–loss: 18–32
- ERA: 4.26
- Strikeouts: 395
- Stats at Baseball Reference

Teams
- Orix Buffaloes (2006 – 2015)
- Last updated on: 20 March 2016

Shinya Nakayama (中山 慎也, Nakayama Shin'ya; born February 22, 1982 in Gunma, Japan) is a Japanese Nippon Professional Baseball player.
