= Katsuhiko Miyaji =

Japanese baseball player and coach (born 1971)

- Outfielder / Coach
- Born: August 28, 1971 (age 54); Daitō, Osaka, Japan
- Batted: Left Threw: Left

NPB debut
- April 10, 1994, for the Seibu Lions

Last NPB appearance
- September 19, 2006, for the Fukuoka SoftBank Hawks

NPB statistics (through 2006)
- Batting average: .275
- Home runs: 12
- Hits: 316

Teams
- As player: Seibu Lions (1990–2003); Fukuoka Daiei Hawks/Fukuoka SoftBank Hawks (2004–2006); Toyama Thunderbirds (2007); As coach: Toyama Thunderbirds (2007); Fukuoka SoftBank Hawks (2008–2010); Saitama Seibu Lions (2011–2016); Tochigi Golden Braves (2017–2018)

Career highlights and awards
- 1× NPB All-Star (2005); 1× Best Nine Award (2005)
- Last updated on: 9 August 2020

Katsuhiko Miyaji (宮地 克彦, born August 28, 1971) is a former Nippon Professional Baseball outfielder.
