= Yukiya Yokoyama =

Japanese baseball player

- Pitcher
- Born: June 1, 1977; Ebina, Kanagawa, Japan
- Batted: Right Threw: Right

NPB debut
- July 6, 1997, for the Yokohama BayStars

Last appearance
- June 26, 2009, for the Yokohama BayStars

NPB statistics (through 2009)
- Win–loss record: 21–26
- Earned run average: 3.89
- Strikeouts: 387
- Saves: 45

Teams
- As player: Yokohama BayStars (1996–2003, 2007–2009); Hokkaido Nippon-Ham Fighters (2004–2006)

Career highlights and awards
- 1× Pacific League Saves Champion (2004); 1× NPB All-Star (2004)

Yukiya Yokoyama (横山 道哉, Yokoyama Yukiya; born June 1, 1977 in Ebina, Kanagawa, Japan) is a Japanese former Nippon Professional Baseball pitcher.
