= Naoyuki Ohmura =

Japanese baseball player (born 1976)

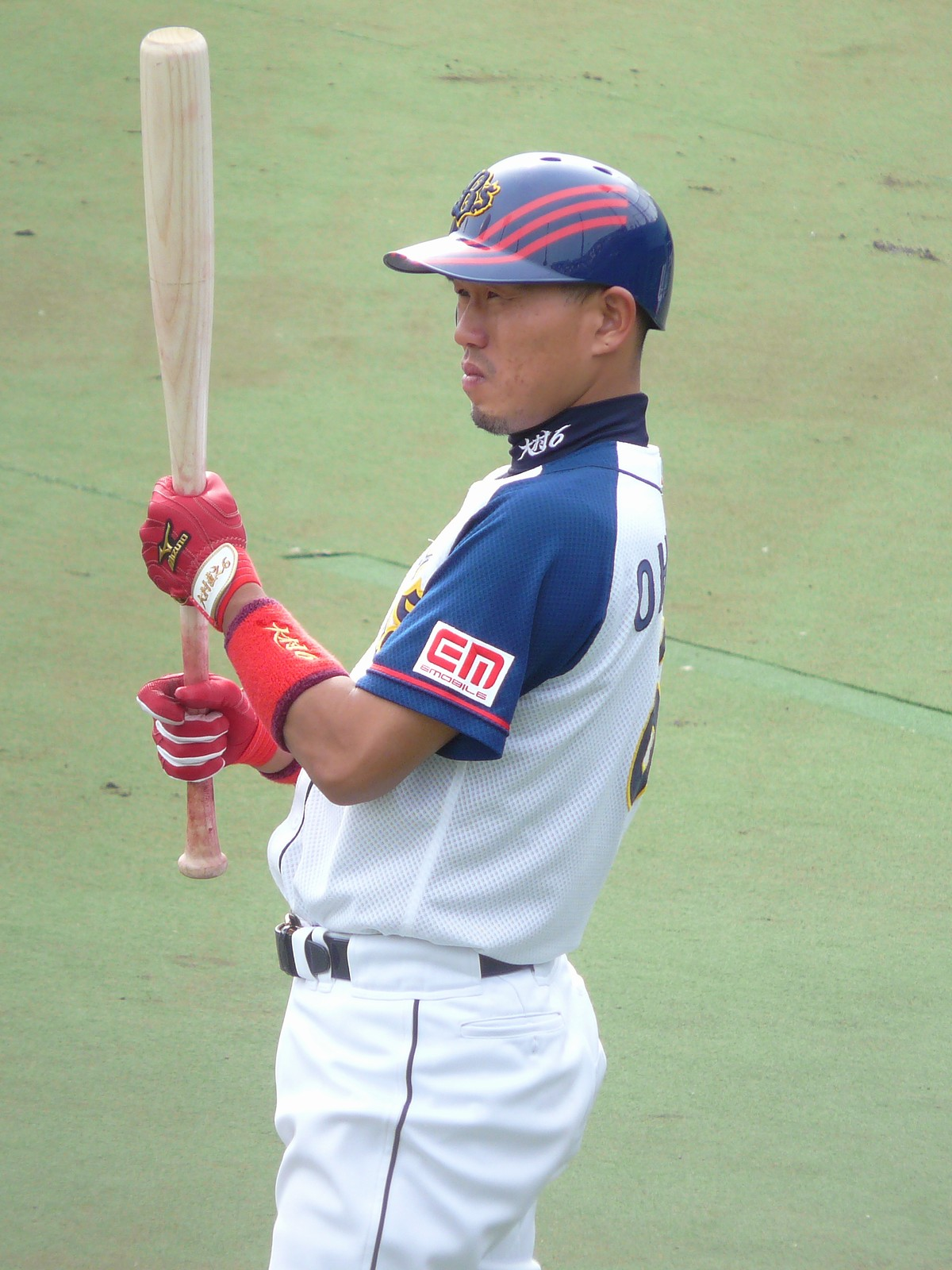
- Outfielder
- Born: February 13, 1976 (age 50); Nishinomiya, Japan
- Batted: Left Threw: Left

NPB debut
- September 17, 1994, for the Kintetsu Buffaloes

Last NPB appearance
- March 26, 2010, for the Orix Buffaloes

NPB statistics
- Batting average: .284
- Hits: 1,865
- Home runs: 78
- Runs batted in: 568
- Stolen base: 203
- Stats at Baseball Reference

Teams
- Kintetsu Buffaloes/Osaka Kintetsu Buffaloes (1994–2004); Fukuoka SoftBank Hawks (2005–2008); Orix Buffaloes (2009–2010)

Career highlights and awards
- 5× NPB All-Star (1998, 2002, 2006, 2007, 2009); 2× Pacific League Best Nine Award (1998, 2007); 3× Pacific League Golden Glove Award (1998, 2003, 2005)

Naoyuki Ohmura (大村 直之, born February 13, 1976, in Nishinomiya, Hyōgo) is a professional baseball player for the Orix Buffaloes in Japan's Nippon Professional Baseball.
