= Takayuki Ohnishi =

Japanese baseball player (born 1971)

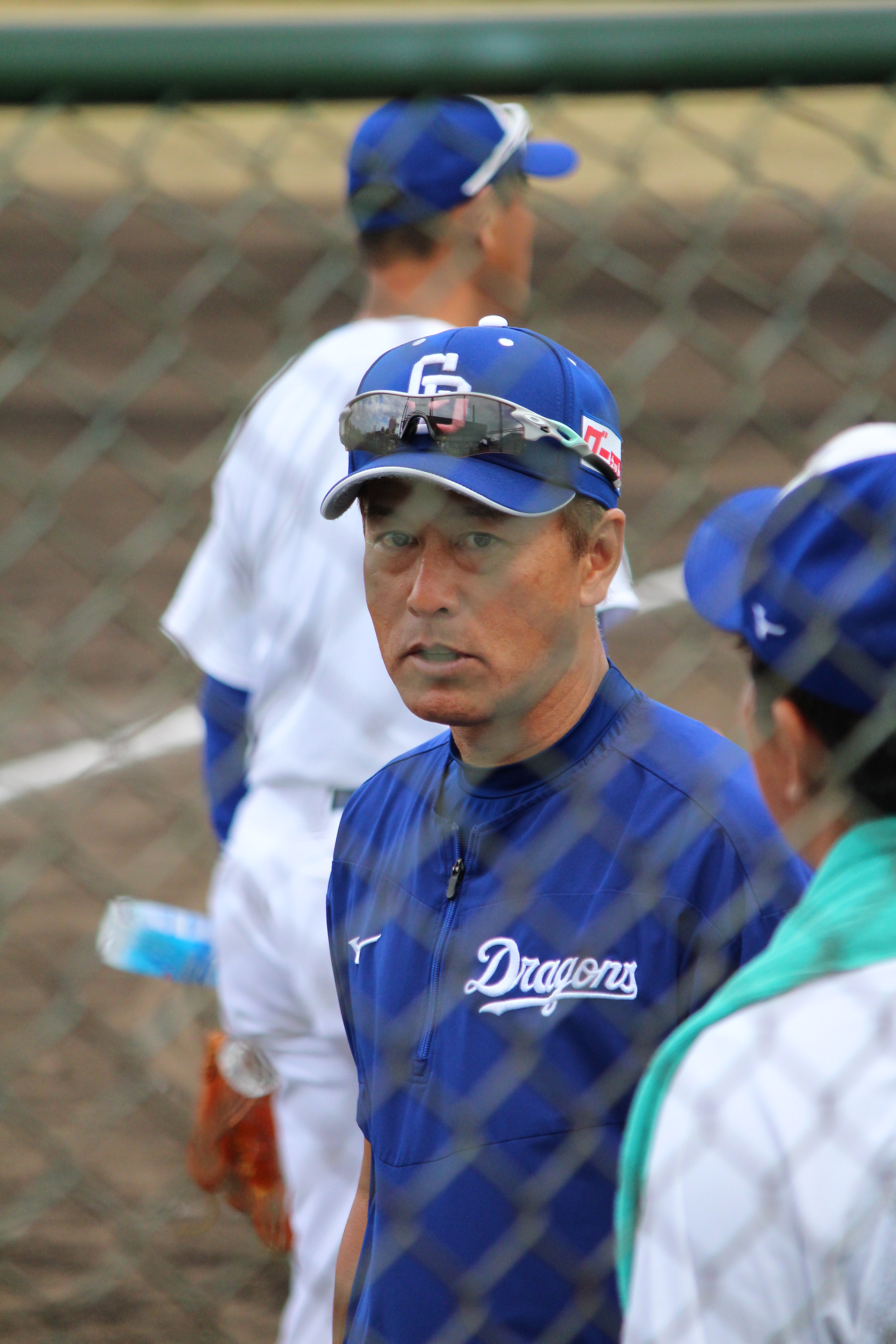
- Onishi at Dragons fall camp Sep. 2022

Fukuoka SoftBank Hawks – No. 79
- Outfielder / Coach
- Born: July 2, 1971 (age 54); Higashiōsaka, Osaka, Japan
- Batted: Right Threw: Right

NPB debut
- May 26, 1996, for the Chunichi Dragons

Last NPB appearance
- July 29, 2006, for the Yomiuri Giants

NPB statistics
- Batting average: .273
- Home runs: 18
- Runs batted in: 108
- Stats at Baseball Reference

Teams
- As player: Chunichi Dragons (1995–2005); Yomiuri Giants (2006); As coach: Yomiuri Giants (2009–2018); Chunichi Dragons (2021–2024); Fukuoka SoftBank Hawks (2025–present)

Career highlights and awards
- Japan Series champion (2025)
- Last updated on: 12 December 2024

Takayuki Ohnishi (大西 崇之, Ōnishi Takayuki; born July 2, 1971) is a Japanese former professional baseball outfielder. He currently serves as a major league team coach for the Fukuoka SoftBank Hawks of Nippon Professional Baseball (NPB). He played in NPB from 1995 to 2006 for the Chunichi Dragons and Yomiuri Giants.
