= Kōsuke Noda =

Japanese baseball player (born 1977)

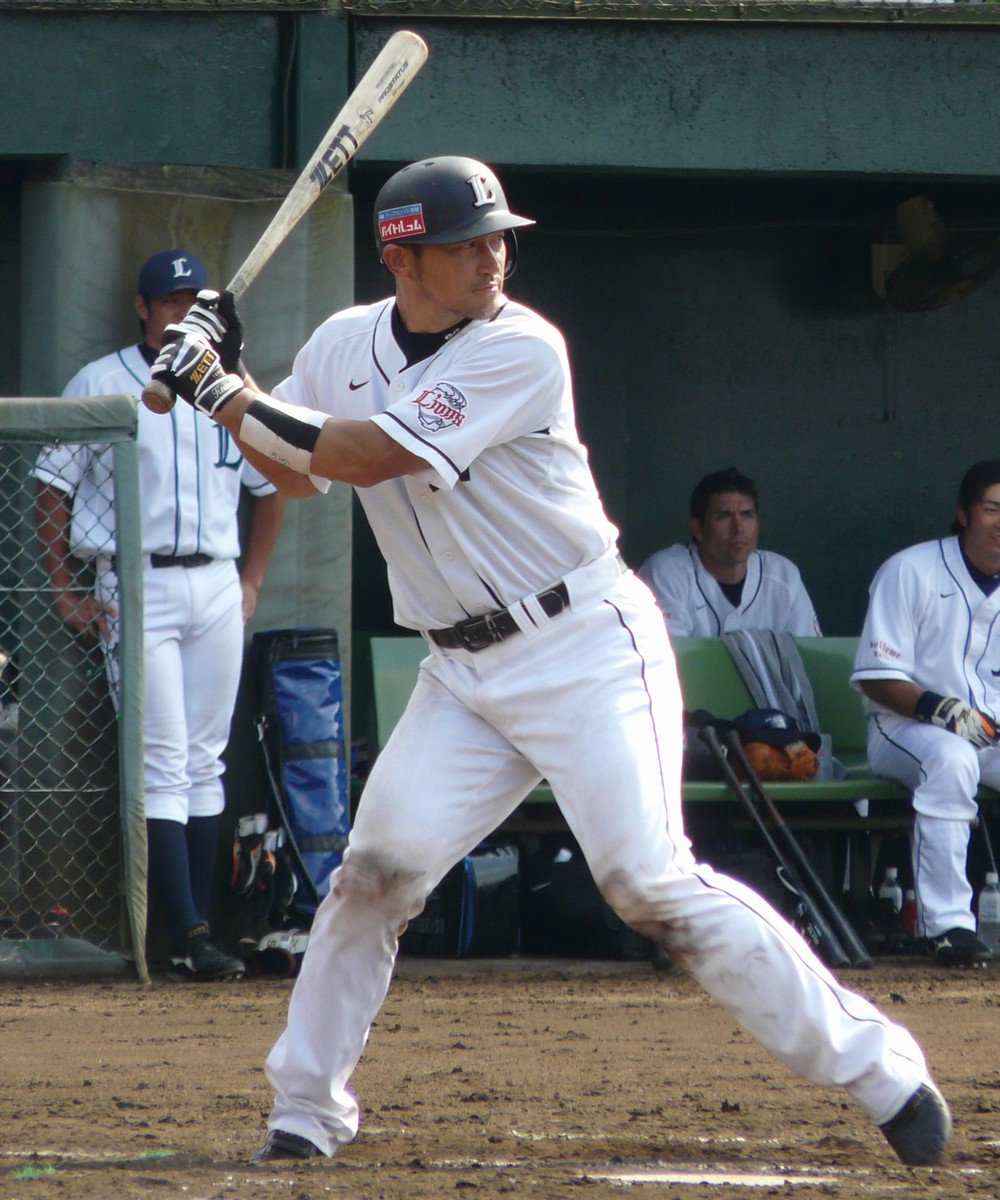

Saitama Seibu Lions – No. 82
- Catcher/Coach
- Born: December 4, 1977 (age 48)
- Bats: Right Throws: Right

NPB debut
- April 1, 2002, for the Seibu Lions

NPB statistics (through 2011)
- Batting average: .195
- Home runs: 5
- RBI: 28
- Stats at Baseball Reference

Teams
- As player: Seibu Lions/Saitama Seibu Lions (2001–2011); As coach: Saitama Seibu Lions (2017–present)

Career highlights and awards
- 2× Japan Series champion (2004, 2008)

Kōsuke Noda (野田 浩輔, Noda Kōsuke; born December 4, 1977) is a former professional Japanese baseball catcher and current coach for the Saitama Seibu Lions in Japan's Nippon Professional Baseball.

Noda played with the Saitama Seibu Lions. He also played for the Japan national baseball team at the 2000 Olympics in Sydney, Australia.

== Early life ==
Kōsuke Noda was born on December 4, 1977, in Yatsushiro (八代市, Yatsushiro-shi), a city located in Kumamoto Prefecture, Japan.

As a teenager, he played for the Kumamoto Prefectural Yatsushiro Higashi High School (八代東高) baseball team.

After high school, Kōsuke joined the Nippon Steel Kimitsu (新日鐵君津) Baseball Club. He would play well enough to earn a roster spot on the Japan national baseball team at the 2000 Olympics along with his Nippon Steel Kimitsu teammate Shunsuke Watanabe.

== Professional life ==
Kōsuke Noda was selected by the Seibu Lions of the Japan Pacific League in the 6th round of the 2000 Nippon Professional Baseball draft.

=== Seibu Lions (2002–2011) ===
2001 Season

In 2001, Kōsuke did not appear with the first team due in part to the presence of regular catcher Tsutomu Ito.

==== 2002 Season ====
Two years after being drafted, at age 24 Kōsuke made his professional debut. Kōsuke played mostly at catcher for the eventual Pacific League Champions, playing alongside notable future MLB players such as Daisuke Matsuzaka and Kazuo Matsui.

Appearing in 34 games, Kōsuke had nine hits in 47 at-bats, giving him a batting average of .191 for his rookie year.

==== 2003 Season ====
Kōsuke played in 36 games at catcher for the Lions, totaling 75 plate appearances. Kōsuke would improve his batting average to .222, while adding his first professional home run.

==== 2004 Season ====
In the 2004 season, Kōsuke would continue to improve upon previous years' numbers, seeing his batting average climb to .237 on 103 plate appearances. In 92 at-bats with the Lions, he had 22 hits while adding four doubles and three home runs.

The Seibu Lions would go on to win the 2004 Japan Series against the Chunichi Dragons.

==== 2005 Season ====
In 2005, Kōsuke would play the fewest number of games since turning professional. In just 26 games, he would manage 11 hits on 48 at-bats, good for a batting average of .229.

==== 2006 Season ====
2006 was another year Kōsuke would see his utilization drop, playing in only seven games for the season. Kōsuke would make the most of his opportunities, batting for a .267 average on fifteen at-bats. He would also net his first career triple.

==== 2007 Season ====
Kōsuke would continue to be efficient on fewer opportunities during the 2007 season. He would achieve his highest batting average to date, earning a .280 average from seven hits on 25 at-bats.

==== 2008 Season ====
Playing for the newly renamed Saitama Seibu Lions, Kōsuke would appear in just nine games. In what would be his least productive professional season to date, Kōsuke would notch just one base hit on 11 at-bats for a batting average of .111.

==== 2009 Season ====
Kōsuke would play in just five games for the Lions in 2009. In those 22 games, he would make 11 plate appearances, going hitless and reaching the base just once on a walk for an average of .000.

==== 2010 Season ====
During the 2010 season, Kōsuke would play in five games, getting eight at-bats. He would make the most of his opportunities, picking up two doubles and earning a batting average of .250.

==== 2011 Season ====
In what would be his final professional season at the age of 33, Kōsuke would see action in nine games. In 17 plate appearances, he would reach base six times, all on walks.

== International career ==
2000 Olympic Games

Kōsuke played for Japan in the 2000 Sydney Olympics. The team just missed out on a medal, finishing in 4th place.

== Coaching ==
Kōsuke Noda is the current batting coach for the Saitama Seibu Lions in Japan's Nippon Professional Baseball, the highest level of baseball in Japan.
