= Domingo Guzmán =

Dominican baseball player (born 1975)

Domingo Guzmán Serrano
- Relief pitcher
- Born: April 5, 1975 (age 50); San Cristóbal, Dominican Republic
- Batted: Right Threw: Right

Professional debut
- MLB: September 9, 1999, for the San Diego Padres
- CPBL: May 27, 2000, for the Koos Group Whales
- NPB: March 31, 2002, for the Yokohama BayStars

Last appearance
- MLB: June 7, 2000, for the San Diego Padres
- CPBL: October 1, 2001, for the Koos Group Whales
- NPB: August 5, 2008, for the Tohoku Rakuten Golden Eagles

MLB statistics
- Win–loss record: 0–1
- Earned run average: 19.50
- Strikeouts: 4

CPBL statistics
- Win–loss record: 5–8
- Earned run average: 3.39
- Strikeouts: 58

NPB statistics
- Win–loss record: 30–37
- Earned run average: 4.01
- Strikeouts: 451
- Stats at Baseball Reference

Teams
- San Diego Padres (1999–2000); Koos Group Whales (2001); Yokohama BayStars (2002–2003); Chunichi Dragons (2004–2006); Tohoku Rakuten Golden Eagles (2007–2008)

Domingo Guzmán Serrano (born April 5, 1975) is a Dominican former Major League Baseball player.

He made his major league debut with the San Diego Padres in 1999, and played in 8 games from 1999 to 2000. He traveled to Taiwan, and played one season in the Chinese Professional Baseball League with the Chinatrust Whales. He was signed by the Yokohama BayStars in 2002, and marked 5 wins to become a part of the starting rotation. He was re-signed for the following season, but was inconsistent throughout the season, marking an 8–12 record with a 4.69 ERA. He was released at the end of 2003, despite leading the last-place BayStars in wins.

He was picked up by the Chunichi Dragons in 2004, and marked a respectable 10–5 record with a 3.76 ERA. He missed most of 2005 after sustaining a shoulder injury, and was demoted to the minors at the beginning of 2006. He was put on waivers in August, and was released shortly afterwards. He now plays for the Tohoku Rakuten Golden Eagles.

He set the world record for consecutive at-bat strikeouts with the BayStars, striking out 18 times in a row in 2003.
