= Kiyoshi Toyoda =

Japanese baseball player

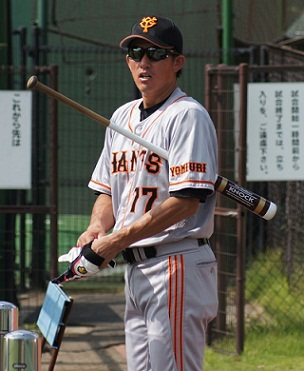

Saitama Seibu Lions – No. 81
- Pitching coach
- Born: February 2, 1971 (age 55)
- Batted: Right Threw: Right

NPB debut
- September 15, 1995, for the Seibu Lions

Last NPB appearance
- September 29, 2011, for the Hiroshima Toyo Carp

NPB statistics (through 2011)
- Win–loss: 66–50
- Saves: 157
- ERA: 2.99
- Strikeouts: 859
- Stats at Baseball Reference

Teams
- As player: Seibu Lions (1993–2005); Yomiuri Giants (2006–2010); Hiroshima Toyo Carp (2011); As coach: Yomiuri Giants (2012–2018); Saitama Seibu Lions (2020–present)

Career highlights and awards
- 2× Japan Series champion (2004, 2009)

Kiyoshi Toyoda (豊田 清, born February 2, 1971) is a Japanese professional baseball player.
