= Koji Mise =

Japanese baseball player

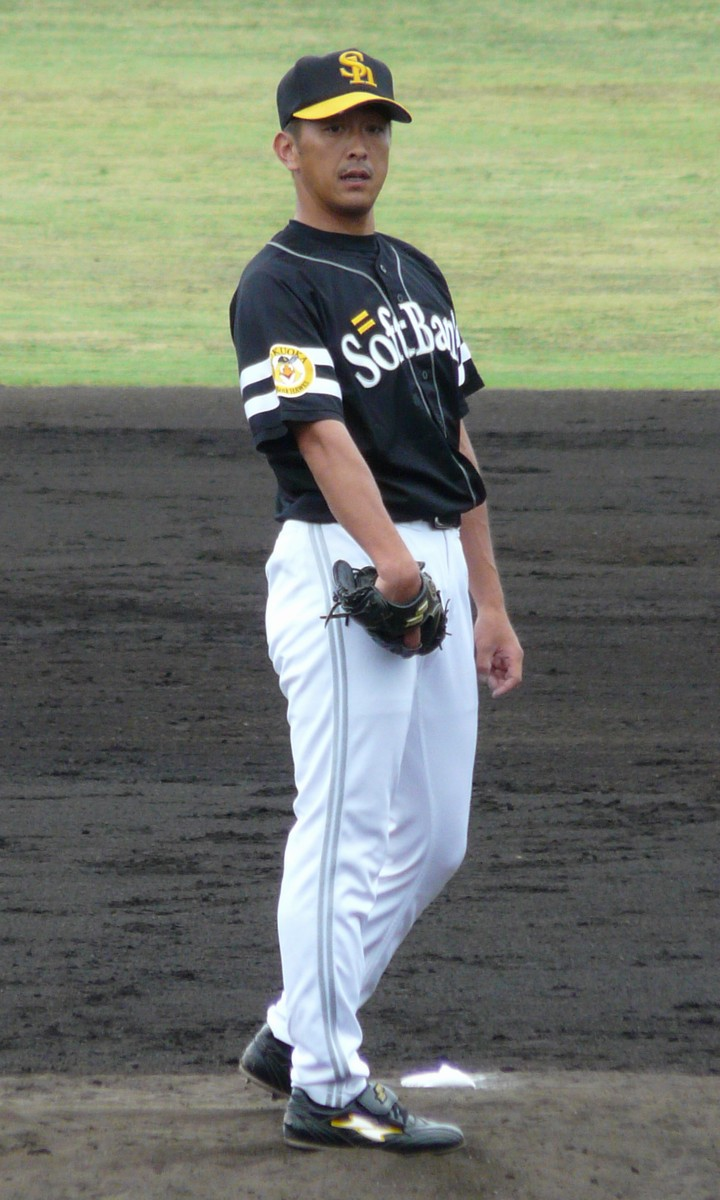
- Pitcher
- Batted: Left Threw: Left

NPB debut
- May 28, 2004, for the Fukuoka Daiei Hawks

Last NPB appearance
- October 1, 2014, for the Chunichi Dragons

Career statistics (through 2014 season)
- Win–loss: 11-13
- Earned Run Average: 4.05
- Strikeouts: 242
- Saves: 47

Teams
- Fukuoka Daiei Hawks/Fukuoka SoftBank Hawks (2004–2010); Chunichi Dragons (2010–2014)

Career highlights and awards
- Pacific League Rookie of the Year (2004); 1× Pacific League Saves Champion (2004); 1× NPB All-Star (2004)

Koji Mise (Japanese: 三瀬 幸司, Hepburn: Mise Koji; born March 11, 1976) is a Japanese baseball player who played as a left-handed relief pitcher in Nippon Professional Baseball. He played for the Fukoka Hawks from 2004–2010 and the Chunichi Dragons from 2010–2014. He was named the Pacific League's Rookie of the Year for 2004, with 55 appearances, throwing 67 and 2/3 innings, a 4-3-1 record and a 3.06 ERA with 28 saves. His nickname is "Mise manager".

== Biography ==
Mise was born in Kagawa Prefecture in 1976. He played as an outfielder in high school, but eventually switched to being a pitcher. In college, he played on Okayama University of Science's team.
