= Kazuki Inoue =

Japanese baseball player and coach (born 1971)

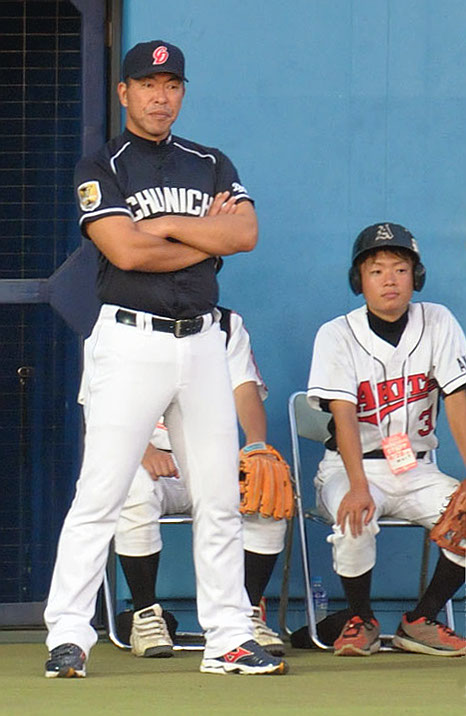

Chunichi Dragons – No. 99
- Outfielder/Coach/Manager
- Born: July 25, 1971 (age 54); Mizobe, Kagoshima, Japan
- Batted: Left Threw: Left

NPB debut
- May 11, 1991, for the Chunichi Dragons

Last NPB appearance
- October 24, 2009, for the Chunichi Dragons

NPB statistics
- Batting average: .275
- Home runs: 79
- RBI: 349
- Stats at Baseball Reference

Teams
- As player: Chunichi Dragons (1990–2009); As coach: Chunichi Dragons (2010–2013); Hanshin Tigers (2020-2022); Chunichi Dragons (2024); As manager: Chunichi Dragons (2025–present)

Career highlights and awards
- 1× Golden Spirit Award (2003)

Kazuki Inoue (井上 一樹, Inoue Kazuki; born July 25, 1971) is a Japanese former professional baseball outfielder and current manager for the Chunichi Dragons of Nippon Professional Baseball (NPB). He played 17 seasons in NPB from 1990 to 2009 for the Dragons.

== Career ==
On October 10, 2024, Inoue was unveiled as the successor to Kazuyoshi Tatsunami as Chunichi Dragons manager.
