= Kosuke Fukudome =

Japanese baseball player (born 1977)

Kosuke Fukudome 福留 孝介
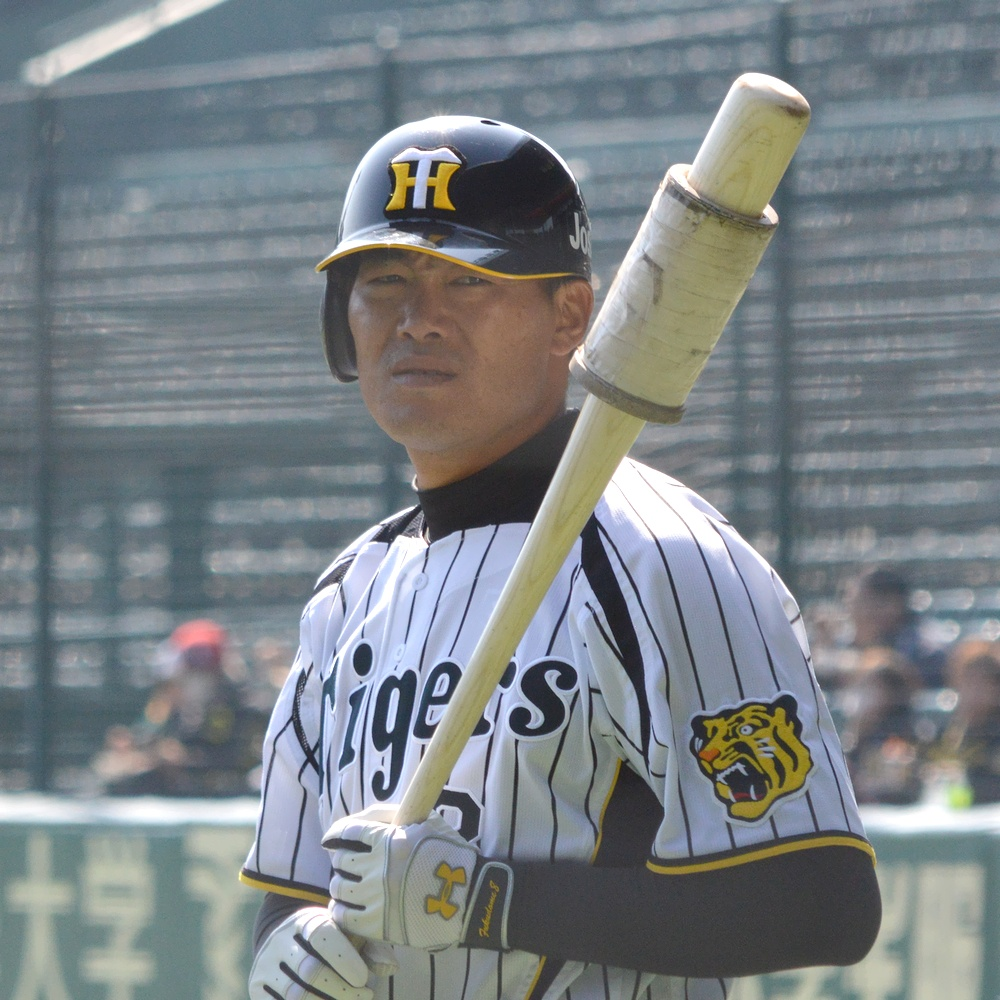
- Fukudome with the Hanshin Tigers in 2013
- Outfielder
- Born: April 26, 1977 (age 49); Osaki, Soo District, Kagoshima, Japan
- Batted: Left Threw: Right

Professional debut
- NPB: April 2, 1999, for the Chunichi Dragons
- MLB: March 31, 2008, for the Chicago Cubs

Last appearance
- NPB: September 23, 2022, for the Chunichi Dragons
- MLB: June 3, 2012, for the Chicago White Sox

NPB statistics
- Batting average: .287
- Hits: 1,951
- Home runs: 285
- Runs batted in: 1,075
- Stolen bases: 76

MLB statistics
- Batting average: .258
- Home runs: 42
- Runs batted in: 195
- Stolen bases: 29
- Stats at Baseball Reference

Teams
- Chunichi Dragons (1999–2007); Chicago Cubs (2008–2011); Cleveland Indians (2011); Chicago White Sox (2012); Hanshin Tigers (2013–2020); Chunichi Dragons (2021–2022)

Career highlights and awards
- NPB: Central League MVP (2006); 2× Central League Batting Champion (2002, 2006); 4× Best Nine Award (2002–2003, 2006, 2015); 4× NPB All-Star (1999, 2002–2004); 5× Golden Glove (2002, 2003, 2005, 2006, 2015); 2× Hit for the cycle (June 8, 2003), (July 30, 2016); MLB: All-Star (2008); WBC: 2× World Baseball Classic champion (2006, 2009)
Medals
Men's baseball
Representing Japan
World Baseball Classic
Gold medal – first place	2006 San Diego	Team
Gold medal – first place	2009 Los Angeles	Team
Olympic Games
Silver medal – second place	1996 Atlanta	Team
Bronze medal – third place	2004 Athens	Team

Kosuke Fukudome (福留 孝介, Fukudome Kōsuke, [ɸɯ̥kɯdome koːsɯ̥ke]; born April 26, 1977) is a Japanese former professional baseball player. He played as an outfielder in the Nippon Professional Baseball (NPB) league from 1999 to 2007 and in Major League Baseball (MLB) from 2008 to 2012 before returning to play in Japan from 2013 to 2022. He played primarily with the Chicago Cubs in MLB and had a long spanning career in the Nippon Professional Baseball with the Chunichi Dragons and Hanshin Tigers.

Prior to arriving in MLB, Fukudome played nine seasons for the Chunichi Dragons of the Nippon Professional Baseball. He was also a member of the Japan national baseball team, winning a silver medal in the 1996 Summer Olympics, a bronze medal in the 2004 Summer Olympics, and placing first in the 2006 World Baseball Classic and 2009 World Baseball Classic. He won the Central League MVP in 2006.

== Early career ==
Fukudome entered the PL Gakuen High School, and was quickly targeted by professional scouts as a potential first round draft pick. Seven teams chose Fukudome in the first round of the 1995 draft, the Kintetsu Buffaloes won the right to negotiate with Fukudome by winning the lottery. However, Fukudome had already decided that he would not turn pro unless he could play with the Chunichi Dragons or Yomiuri Giants, and joined Nihon Seimei, whose baseball team belonged to the industrial leagues. In 1996, at the age of 19, he became the youngest player to ever be chosen for an Olympic baseball team, and his team won a silver medal in the Atlanta Olympics.

== Professional career ==
=== Chunichi Dragons ===
The Chunichi Dragons drafted Fukudome in 1998 NPB draft in the first round as a shortstop. Fukudome had grown up a fan of Dragons infielder Kazuyoshi Tatsunami, and received an autograph from Tatsunami, who would be his teammate when he joined the Dragons.

Manager Senichi Hoshino used Fukudome in 132 games in his rookie year, and Fukudome batted .284 with 16 home runs, and contributing to his team's league championship. However, he also led the league in strikeouts. While Fukudome was fast and had a strong throwing arm, he simply could not field ground balls well at shortstop. He made several errors which led to his team's loss in the Japan Series, and was often taken out of games in later innings.

He was converted to third base in his second year, but his fielding improved little, and his hitting dropped as well. The next year, he was moved to the outfield. While he played poorly at first, he gradually improved to become the everyday right fielder. His natural speed and strong arm has since led to his winning four Golden Glove awards in the outfield.

His hitting also improved dramatically. He stopped Hideki Matsui in his run for the triple crown in 2002, by leading the league in batting average (.343). He hit .313 with 34 homers the next year, establishing himself as one of the best hitters in the league.

In 2004, he joined the Japanese Olympic baseball team for the second time, winning a bronze medal in the Athens Olympics. He was chosen for the 2006 World Baseball Classic team, and pinch-hit with a two-run home run off Byung-hyun Kim in the semi-finals against Korea. He pinch-hit again in the finals for a two-run hit against Cuba.

In 2006, he batted .351 with 31 home runs and 104 RBIs, winning the Central League MVP award.

When asked whether he had any interest in the Major Leagues on a television show in the 2006 off-season, Fukudome answered, "It would be a lie to say I didn't. Playing in the World Baseball Classic increased my desire to play in the majors."

Fukudome became a free agent in November 2007.

=== Chicago Cubs ===
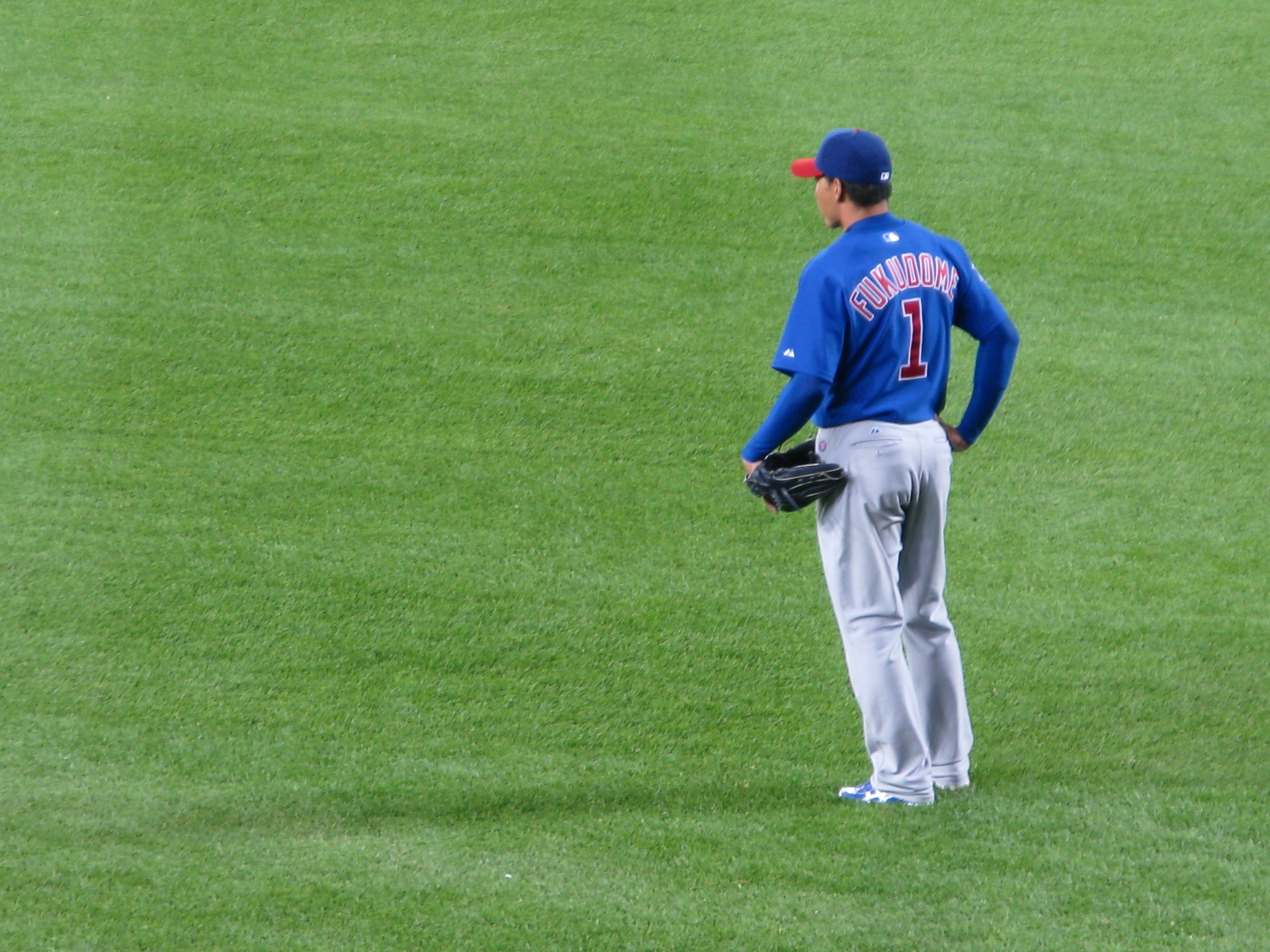
Fukudome with the Cubs

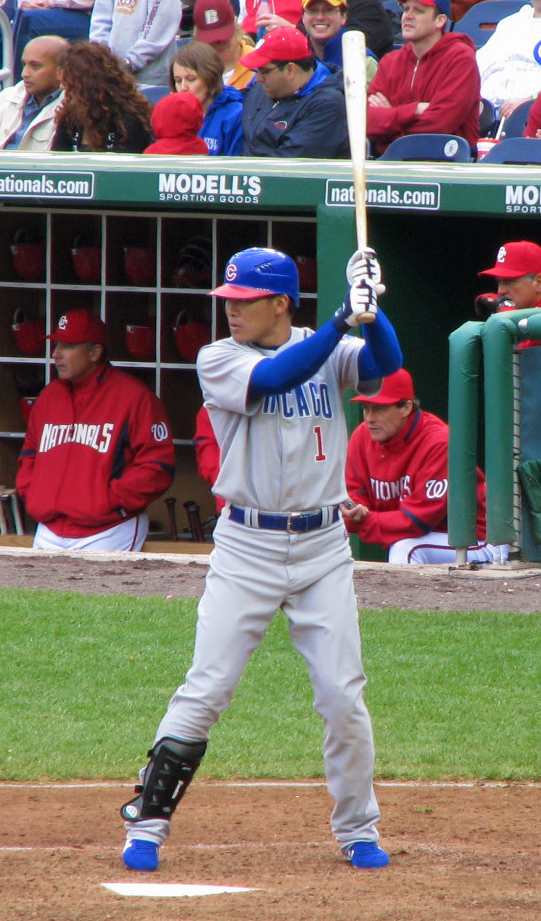
Fukudome at bat with the Chicago Cubs

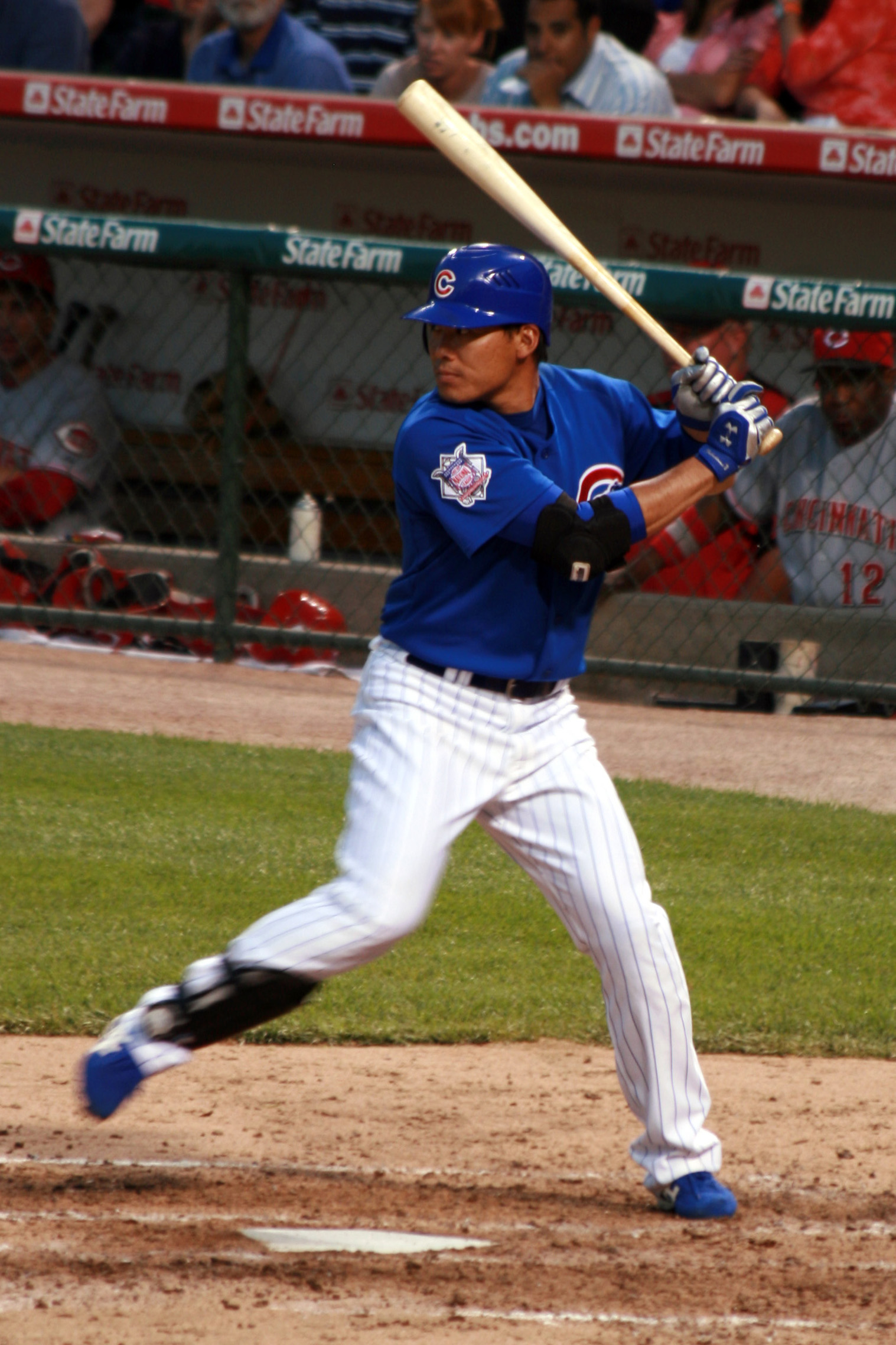
Fukudome with the Cubs in 2008

On December 11, 2007, the Chicago Cubs signed Fukudome to a four-year, $48 million contract. Fukudome said in an interview that one of the main reasons he chose the Chicago Cubs over the other three teams trying to sign him to their roster was because he wanted to be the first Japanese player to play for the team. He also thought Chicago had a great Japanese community, and that it was a great place to raise his children.

Fukudome made his Major League debut on March 31, 2008, against the Milwaukee Brewers at Wrigley Field. He went 3-for-3 with a walk, including a double on his first Major League pitch, and a three-run game-tying home run off Brewers' closer Éric Gagné in the bottom of the ninth inning. The Brewers went on to win 4–3 in extra innings.

In April 2008, a souvenir stand selling unlicensed Cubs apparel sold a t-shirt bearing the Cubs cartoon bear wearing oversized Harry Caray-style glasses encircled by the phrase "Horry Kow" (an Engrish play on Caray's "Holy Cow!" catchphrase) in cartoonish Asian script below. Mark Kolbusz, the souvenir stand operator, said the shirt was his top seller so far that season, and that 1 in 10 customers complained that it was offensive. After he was shown the shirt, Fukudome said through his interpreter, "I don't know what the creator of the shirt meant this to be, but they should make it right. Maybe the creator created it because he thought it was funny, or maybe he made it to condescend the race. I don't know." After a story on the t-shirt appeared in the Chicago Sun-Times, the Cubs ordered Kolbusz to pull the shirt off the stand and to stop production.

After a fast start, Fukudome's 2008 MLB performance faded. After a .327 batting average in April, each successive month reflected less success as Fukudome batted .293 in May, .264 in June, .236 in July, .193 in August, and .178 in September, followed by .100 in the postseason. He ended the year with a .257 average, and a .370 slugging percentage. He hit .251 against right-handers, and .137 when there were 2 outs and runners in scoring position. Fukudome's slide was detailed in a New York Times article.

Nonetheless, on July 7, 2008, Fukudome was voted a starter in the 2008 MLB All-Star Game. Cubs manager Lou Piniella defended him from criticism, and said, "[Fukudome] does such a good job in right field we hate to take him out of the lineup", and further stated the team would continue to give him more opportunities. He became one of only 27 rookie players in MLB history to have started an All-Star game.

After the Game 2 loss to the Dodgers in the NLDS, a reporter asked Piniella, enraged about the loss, about starting Fukudome. Piniella responded, "I'm going to play [Mike] Fontenot or Reed Johnson or somebody else, and that's the end of that story. The kid is struggling, and there's no sense sending him out there anymore." Fukudome managed only one single in 10 at-bats in the postseason.

In 2009, the Cubs switched Fukudome to center field, after acquiring right fielder Milton Bradley. In July, Fukudome became the Cubs' leadoff hitter. He replaced Alfonso Soriano, who had been performing poorly in May and June. He had the lowest range factor of all starting major league center fielders (2.29). Fukudome walked 93 times, hit 38 doubles, and stole six bases. His .375 on-base percentage was second on the team.

During his time in Chicago, Fukudome quickly endeared himself to supporters and became a fan favorite. His #1 Jersey was one of the League's best sellers during his tenure with the Cubs.

=== Cleveland Indians ===
On July 28, 2011, he was traded to the Cleveland Indians for 2 minor league prospects. In 59 games in Cleveland, he hit only .249. On August 12, right fielder Shin-Soo Choo was activated from the 15-day disabled list, moving Fukudome to Center field. But on August 27, Choo suffered another injury that would put him on the 15-day disabled list again on September 1, and that moved Fukudome back to right.

=== Chicago White Sox ===
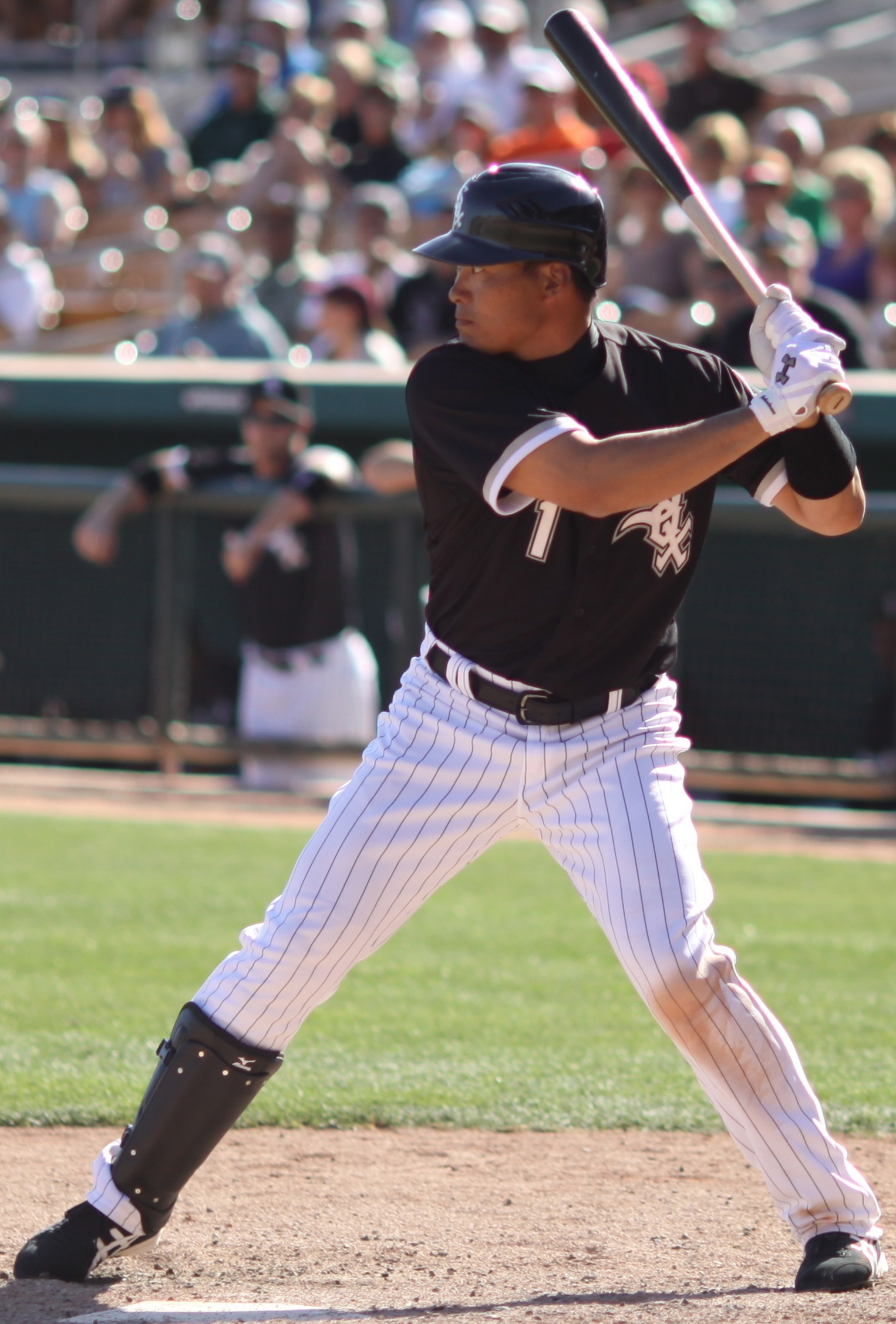
Fukudome with the Chicago White Sox

Fukudome signed a 1-year $1 million contract with the Chicago White Sox on February 14, 2012. On June 22, Fukudome was designated for assignment after hitting .171, 0 home runs and 4 RBI in 24 games played and 41 at-bats. Fukudome was released June 26.

=== New York Yankees ===
The New York Yankees signed Fukudome to a minor league contract on July 13, 2012. Fukudome was released by the Yankees September 3, 2012 after hitting .264 in 43 games for New York's AAA Scranton/Wilkes-Barre team.

=== Hanshin Tigers ===
After the 2012 MLB season, Fukudome returned to the NPB and signed with the Hanshin Tigers. After playing just 63 games in 2013 and 104 in 2014 with limited offensive production, Fukudome experienced a resurgence in 2015 at the age of 38. In playing all but three of the season's 143 games, he batted .281 with 20 home runs, 24 doubles, and 76 RBI. The home run and RBI totals were Fukudome's highest since his second to last year with the Chunichi Dragons of the Central League in 2006.

At the end of the 2015 season, Fukudome was named to an NPB Best Nine lineup for a fourth time and was awarded his fifth career Golden Glove as an outfielder. The nine years between his last Golden Glove and 2015 is a Central League record. He returned to the Tigers' outfield in 2016 for his 18th professional season at age 39.

On 30 July 2016, Fukudome became the 4th player in NPB history to register multiple cycle hits as he helped lead the Tigers to an 8–3 victory over his former team, the Chunichi Dragons.

On December 2, 2020, he become a free agent.

=== Second stint with the Dragons ===
On December 18, 2020, Fukudome signed a contract to return to the Dragons and held a press conference. On September 23, 2022, he retired after 24 years. Fukudome was the last active NPB player to have played in the 20th century.

== World Baseball Classic ==
Fukudome was a part of the 2006 World Baseball Classic and 2009 World Baseball Classic champion Japanese teams.
