= Takashi Ishii (baseball) =

Japanese baseball player and coach (born 1971)

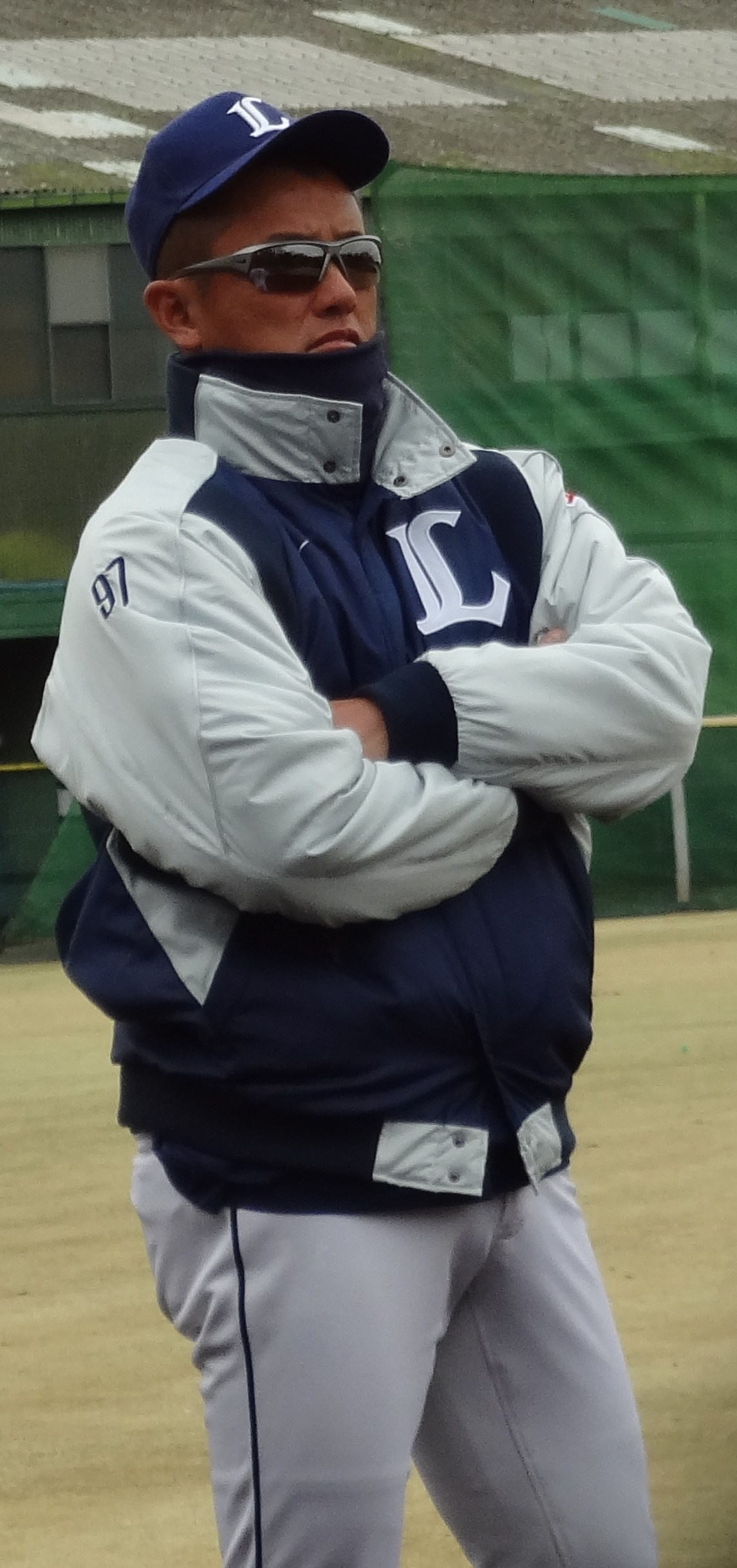

Tohoku Rakuten Golden Eagles – No. 80
- Pitcher / Coach
- Born: August 25, 1971 (age 54); Ayase, Kanagawa
- Batted: Right Threw: Right

NPB debut
- July 7, 1994, for the Seibu Lions

Last NPB appearance
- September 28, 2007, for the Seibu Lions

NPB statistics
- Win–loss record: 68–58
- Earned run average: 3.78
- Strikeouts: 671
- Saves: 13
- Holds: 26

Teams
- As player: Seibu Lions (1994–2007); As manager: Tokushima Indigo Socks (2018); As coach: Saitama Seibu Lions (2008–2013); Tohoku Rakuten Golden Eagles (2019–present)

Takashi Ishii (石井 貴, Ishii Takashi; born 25 August 1971) is a Japanese professional baseball pitcher and coach. He pitched for 14 seasons for the Seibu Lions and made three All-Star teams. His brother Akio Ishii was drafted in 1986 but never made it into Nippon Pro Baseball.

== Career ==
Takashi Ishii played for Mitsubishi Heavy Industries Yokohama in the industrial leagues out of high school. While with Mitsubishi, he was timed at 94 mph. Seibu drafted him in the first round in 1993. In 1994, the rookie was roughed up for 14 hits and 13 runs in 6 2/3 innings for Seibu. He improved to 2-2, 4.03 as a swingman in 1995 but allowed a .304 average.

In 1996, Ishii was 3-6 with four saves and a 2.93 ERA. Among Lions hurlers with 50+ innings, only closer Tetsuya Shiozaki had a better ERA. Takashi was 10-8 with nine saves and a 3.61 ERA in 59 outings in 1997. He was second on Seibu in appearances after LOOGY Takehiro Hashimoto, tied Shinji Mori for the most saves and tied Kiyoshi Toyoda for third in wins. He made the Pacific League All-Star team for the first time. He allowed eight hits and four runs (three earned) in 5 2/3 IP in the 1997 Japan Series, but the team fell to the Yakult Swallows.

The Kanagawa native was 9-3 with a 3.29 ERA in 1998 while moving primarily into the rotation. He tied Tomohiro Kuroki for second in the circuit in ERA behind Satoru Kanemura but failed to make the All-Star team. He started and won game four of the 1998 Japan Series after relieving in game two; he was 1-0 with a 2.61 ERA and 0.67 WHIP for the Series, which Seibu dropped to the Yokohama BayStars in six games.

Ishii turned in a 13-8, 3.07 campaign in 1999, his first year full-time as a starter. He made his second All-Star team. He was sixth in the circuit in ERA and fifth in wins. He had the second-best ERA on the Seibu starting staff, trailing Daisuke Matsuzaka, on a strong rotation including Toyoda, Shiozaki (at times), Mori (at times), Fumiya Nishiguchi and Matsuzaka.

In 2000, Takashi fell to 10-7, 4.31. In May, he was hit in the head by a Koji Akiyama liner but did not sustain serious injury. He made his last All-Star team that season. He tied six others for the league lead with two shutouts. In 2001, Ishii was 5-9 with a 3.76 ERA. The veteran right-hander rebounded to 8-3, 3.11 in 2002. Had he qualified, he would have ranked fifth in the PL in ERA. Among Seibu's regularly-used starting pitchers, only Chih-Chia Chang had a better ERA while Ishii out-pitched Koji Mitsui, Nishiguchi, Ming-Chieh Hsu, Shiozaki and Matsuzaka. Seibu was swept in the 2002 Japan Series by the Yomiuri Giants; Ishii started and lost game two. He was roughed up for seven hits and six runs in just two innings before Hsu relieved him.

Ishii was 1-2 with a 4.24 ERA in 2003 while battling shoulder problems. Not fully healthy in 2004, he was just 1-5 with a 4.65 ERA. Matsuzaka, Nishiguchi, Chang and Kazuyuki Hoashi all had better regular seasons, but Seibu skipper Tsutomu Itō still went with Ishii to start game one of the 2004 Japan Series. He turned in a gem, a combined shutout of the Chunichi Dragons for the win. He did not pitch again until game seven, when he was called on to face Domingo Guzmán in the finale. Ishii again pitched shutout ball to get the win (his bullpen did allow two late runs). He finished 2-0 with 13 scoreless innings and only five hits for the Series, having won more games than he had in the entire regular season, something no one had ever done before. He was named Japan Series MVP, presumably his career highlight.

Ishii fell to 2-4, 8.04 in 2005 with a .353 opponent average. He rebounded to 4-1, 3.49 in 2006 while pitching full-time as a reliever for the first time in nine years. He allowed six runs in 7 1/3 innings in 2007 to end his playing career. He later was Seibu's pitching coach.

Overall, Takashi Ishii was 68-58 with 13 saves and a 3.78 ERA in 321 games in Nippon Pro Baseball.

Ishii retired after the 2007 season, and became a pitching coach for the Lions.
