= Masahiro Araki =

Japanese baseball player

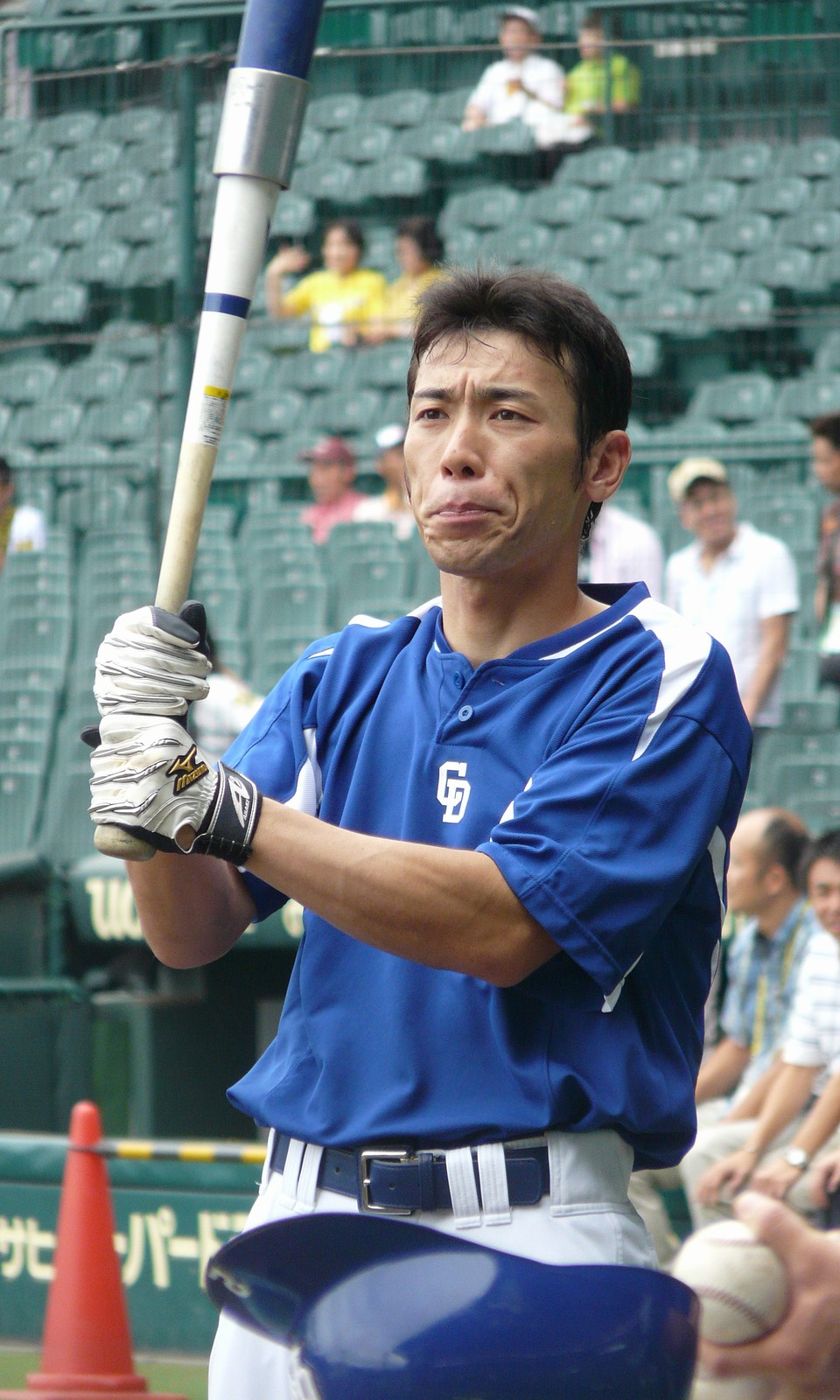
- Araki with the Chunichi Dragons
- Second baseman/Infield Coach
- Born: September 13, 1977 (age 48); Kikuchi District, Kumamoto, Japan
- Batted: Right Threw: Right

NPB debut
- May 31, 1997, for the Chunichi Dragons

Last NPB appearance
- October 13, 2018, for the Chunichi Dragons

Career statistics (through 2018)
- Batting average: .268
- Hits: 2,043
- Home runs: 34
- Runs batted in: 468
- Stolen bases: 378
- Stats at Baseball Reference

Teams
- As player: Chunichi Dragons (1997–2018); As coach: Chunichi Dragons (2018–2023)

Career highlights and awards
- 5× NPB All-Star (2005, 2008, 2009, 2011, 2012); 3× Best Nine Award (2004–2006); 6× Mitsui Golden Glove Award (2004–2009); 1× Central League stolen base champion (2007); 1× NPB All-Star Game MVP (2008 Game 2); 1× Japan Series champion (2007)

Masahiro Araki (荒木 雅博; born September 13, 1977 in Kumamoto, Japan) is a retired Japanese professional baseball player. He played predominantly at second base for the Chunichi Dragons. He was noted for his speed and defense.

== Early career ==
Araki was a first-round draft pick by Chunichi in 1995, out of high school. In 1997, he made his NPB debut and hit .179/.203/.209 in 74 plate appearances; he did steal 12 bases in 16 tries to lead his team. Araki was used as a defensive substitute in the outfield and at shortstop.

In 1998, the 20-year-old played 7 games for Chunichi but had just one at-bat, appearing as a pinch-runner and defensive sub. The next year, he went 1 for 4 in 16 games in a similar role; in four steal attempts, he was only successful once. In 2000, Araki remained a substitute, playing 40 games but only getting 12 plate appearances (2 for 10, 2 sacrifice flies, 3 SB in 3 tries). He spent 34 games in the outfield.

== Increased role ==
Araki became a semi-regular in 2001 and produced at a .338/.384/.438 clip with 13 steals and 9 times caught stealing. He backed up veteran Kazuyoshi Tatsunami at second base. In 2002, Tatsunami moved to third so Araki could take over at second. He batted .259/.279/.296 and stole 16 bases in 20 attempts. He fielded .986 and led Chunichi in steals. In 2003, the speedster hit .237/.283/.314 with 15 steals in 24 attempts. He fielded .990 and again led the Dragons in swipes.

== Star ==
Araki improved significantly in 2004, batting .292/.322/.349, stealing 39 bases in 48 tries and scored 93 runs. He replaced Hirokazu Ibata at the top of the Dragons batting order, Ibata dropping to second to form a swift 1-2 punch. He fielded .992 and won his first Gold Glove. He was second in the Central League in steals behind Norihiro Akahoshi and tied Toshihisa Nishi for third in hits (176). He made his first All-Star team. That year, Araki and Greg LaRocca tied for the CL Best Nine Award at second base; it was the first tie ever in voting for a Best Nine in NPB history. He hit .267/.333/.433 in the 2004 Japan Series as Chunichi fell in 7 games.

In 2005, Araki's batting line was .291/.332/.345; he scored 88 runs and stole 42 bases in 53 tries. He set a CL record with 623 AB, tied Ibata for 5th in the league in hits (181), was 9th in runs (88) and second to Akahoshi in stolen bases. He made his second All-Star team and was named to the Best Nine. He also set NPB records for total chances (913) and assists (496) by a second sacker. He won his second Gold Glove.

Araki hit .300/.338/.358 in 2006 and stole 30 bases in 37 tries. He was 10th in the league in average and third in steals, behind Norichika Aoki and Akahoshi. He was again an All-Star and Best Nine. His 12 errors were a new career high but he won his third Gold Glove. In the 2006 Japan Series, he was just 2 for 18 with two walks and a steal.

In 2007, Masahiro batted .263/.296/.302 with 31 steals in 37 tries. He was dropped to second in the lineup, flipped with double-play partner Ibata in the lineup. He led the CL in steals and was second with 30 sacrifice hits. In the 2007 Japan Series, Araki hit .350/.350/.381 with 4 steals and 5 runs in 5 games to help Chunichi to its first Japan Series title in 53 years.

Araki joined the Japanese national team for the 2007 Asian Championship; appearing as a pinch-runner, he scored twice in three games and never batted, played the field or attempted to steal. In the second 2008 NPB All-Star Game, Araki won MVP honors, going 3 for 4 with 3 RBI in leading the CL to victory. In the 2008 Olympics, Araki hit .263/.364/.421 with 2 steals and 5 runs in 8 games, being used as Japan's main second baseman, playing flawless defense. Araki laid down 5 sacrifice bunts for traditionalist manager Senichi Hoshino's squad. In the Bronze Medal Game, Araki hit a first-inning solo homer off of Brett Anderson to put Japan ahead but the USA came back for an 8–4 win as Japan failed to get a Medal. Araki tied for the most steals in the preliminary rounds, as his 2 tied Giorvis Duvergel, Hyun-soo Kim, Tsuyoshi Nishioka, Eduardo Paret, Lee Jong-wook and Sun Lingfeng.

== See also ==
- List of Nippon Professional Baseball career hits leaders

== Sources ==
- Japanesebaseball.com by Michael Westbay
- Japan Baseball Daily by Gary Garland
- 2008 Olympics
