= 2005 Nippon Professional Baseball season =

2005 NPB season
- League: Nippon Professional Baseball
- Sport: Baseball
- Duration: March 26, 2005 – October 26, 2005

Regular season
- Season MVP: CL: Tomoaki Kanemoto (HAN); PL: Toshiya Sugiuchi (SBH)

League postseason
- CL champions: Hanshin Tigers
- CL runners-up: Chunichi Dragons
- PL champions: Chiba Lotte Marines
- PL runners-up: Fukuoka SoftBank Hawks

Japan Series
- Venue: Chiba Marine Stadium, Chiba City, Chiba; Hanshin Koshien Stadium, Nishinomiya, Hyōgo
- Champions: Chiba Lotte Marines
- Runners-up: Hanshin Tigers
- Finals MVP: Toshiaki Imae (LOT)

NPB seasons
- ← 2004 2006 →

In 2005 the Nippon Professional Baseball season ended with the Chiba Lotte Marines of the Pacific League defeating the Hanshin Tigers of the Central League in a four-game sweep in the Nippon Series.

== Format ==
=== Central League ===
- Season format
  - Regular season
- Regular season 1st place is the champion

=== Pacific League ===
- Season format
  - Regular season
  - Playoff 1st stage: Regular season 2nd place vs. regular season 3rd place – Best of 3
  - Playoff 2nd stage: Regular season 1st place vs. playoff 1st stage winner – Best of 5
- Playoff 2nd stage winner is the champion

=== Japan Series ===
- Central League champion vs. Pacific League champion – Best of 7

== Standings ==
=== Central League ===
==== Regular season ====
Central League	G	W	L	T	Pct.	GB
Hanshin Tigers	146	87	54	5	.617	-—
Chunichi Dragons	146	79	66	1	.545	10.0
Yokohama BayStars	146	69	70	7	.496	16.5
Yakult Swallows	146	71	73	2	.493	18.0
Yomiuri Giants	146	62	80	4	.437	25.0
Hiroshima Toyo Carp	146	58	84	4	.408	29.0

=== Pacific League ===
==== Regular season ====
Pacific League	G	W	L	T	Pct.	GB
Fukuoka SoftBank Hawks	136	89	45	2	.664	—
Chiba Lotte Marines	136	84	49	3	.632	4.5
Seibu Lions	136	67	69	0	.493	23.0
Orix Buffaloes	136	62	70	4	.470	26.0
Hokkaido Nippon-Ham Fighters	136	62	71	3	.466	26.5
Tohoku Rakuten Golden Eagles	136	38	97	1	.281	51.5

==== Playoff 1st stage ====
Chiba Lotte Marines (2) vs. Seibu Lions (0)

Game	Score	Date	Location	Attendance
1	Seibu Lions – 1, Chiba Lotte Marines – 2	October 8	Chiba Marine Stadium	28,979
2	Seibu Lions – 1, Chiba Lotte Marines – 3	October 9	Chiba Marine Stadium	28,996

==== Playoff 2nd stage ====
Fukuoka SoftBank Hawks (2) vs. Chiba Lotte Marines (3)

Game	Score	Date	Location	Attendance
1	Chiba Lotte Marines – 4, Fukuoka SoftBank Hawks – 2	October 12	Fukuoka Yahoo! Japan Dome	31,848
2	Chiba Lotte Marines – 3, Fukuoka SoftBank Hawks – 2	October 13	Fukuoka Yahoo! Japan Dome	31,696
3	Chiba Lotte Marines – 4, Fukuoka SoftBank Hawks – 5 (10 innings)	October 15	Fukuoka Yahoo! Japan Dome	34,757
4	Chiba Lotte Marines – 2, Fukuoka SoftBank Hawks – 3	October 16	Fukuoka Yahoo! Japan Dome	34,772
5	Chiba Lotte Marines – 3, Fukuoka SoftBank Hawks – 2	October 17	Fukuoka Yahoo! Japan Dome	35,071

== Awards ==
=== Best Nine Awards ===
Central League

Position	Player	Team
P	Hiroki Kuroda	Hiroshima Toyo Carp
C	Akihiro Yano	Hanshin Tigers
1B	Takahiro Arai	Hiroshima Toyo Carp
2B	Masahiro Araki	Chunichi Dragons
3B	Makoto Imaoka	Hanshin Tigers
SS	Hirokazu Ibata	Chunichi Dragons
OF	Norihiro Akahoshi	Hanshin Tigers
OF	Norichika Aoki	Yakult Swallows
OF	Tomoaki Kanemoto	Hanshin Tigers

Pacific League

Position	Player	Team
P	Toshiya Sugiuchi	Fukuoka SoftBank Hawks
C	Kenji Johjima	Fukuoka SoftBank Hawks
1B	Julio Zuleta	Fukuoka SoftBank Hawks
2B	Koichi Hori	Chiba Lotte Marines
3B	Toshiaki Imae	Chiba Lotte Marines
SS	Tsuyoshi Nishioka	Chiba Lotte Marines
OF	Matt Franco	Chiba Lotte Marines
OF	Katsuhiko Miyaji	Fukuoka SoftBank Hawks
OF	Kazuhiro Wada	Seibu Lions
DH	Nobuhiko Matsunaka	Fukuoka SoftBank Hawks

=== Gold Gloves ===
Central League

Position	Player	Team
P	Hiroki Kuroda	Hiroshima Toyo Carp
C	Akihiro Yano	Hanshin Tigers
1B	Andy Sheets	Hanshin Tigers
2B	Masahiro Araki	Chunichi Dragons
3B	Akinori Iwamura	Yakult Swallows
SS	Hirokazu Ibata	Chunichi Dragons
OF	Kosuke Fukudome	Chunichi Dragons
OF	Norihiro Akahoshi	Hanshin Tigers
OF	Tatsuhiko Kinjo	Yokohama BayStars

Pacific League

Position	Player	Team
P	Daisuke Matsuzaka	Seibu Lions
C	Kenji Johjima	Fukuoka SoftBank Hawks
1B	Kazuya Fukuura	Chiba Lotte Marines
2B	Tsuyoshi Nishioka	Chiba Lotte Marines
3B	Toshiaki Imae	Chiba Lotte Marines
SS	Makoto Kosaka	Chiba Lotte Marines
OF	Tsuyoshi Shinjo	Hokkaido Nippon-Ham Fighters
OF	Saburo Ohmura	Chiba Lotte Marines
OF	Naoyuki Ohmura	Fukuoka SoftBank Hawks

== See also ==
- 2005 Major League Baseball season
