= Hiroyuki Takagi =

Japanese baseball player and coach (born 1972)

- Infielder / Coach
- Born: October 14, 1972 (age 53); Inazawa, Aichi
- Batted: Left Threw: Right

NPB debut
- June 17, 1995, for the Seibu Lions

Last NPB appearance
- September 28, 2008, for the Saitama Seibu Lions

NPB statistics (through 2008)
- Batting average: .256
- Home runs: 10
- Hits: 643

Teams
- As player: Seibu Lions/Saitama Seibu Lions (1995–2008); As coach: Saitama Seibu Lions (2013–2020)

Career highlights and awards
- 1× Best Nine Award (2002); 1× Mitsui Golden Glove Award (2002); 2× NPB All-Star (1999, 2003); 2× Japan Series champion (2004, 2008)
- Last updated on: 3 November 2014

Hiroyuki Takagi (高木 浩之, born October 14, 1972) is a former Nippon Professional Baseball infielder.
