= Shuichiro Osada =

Japanese baseball player

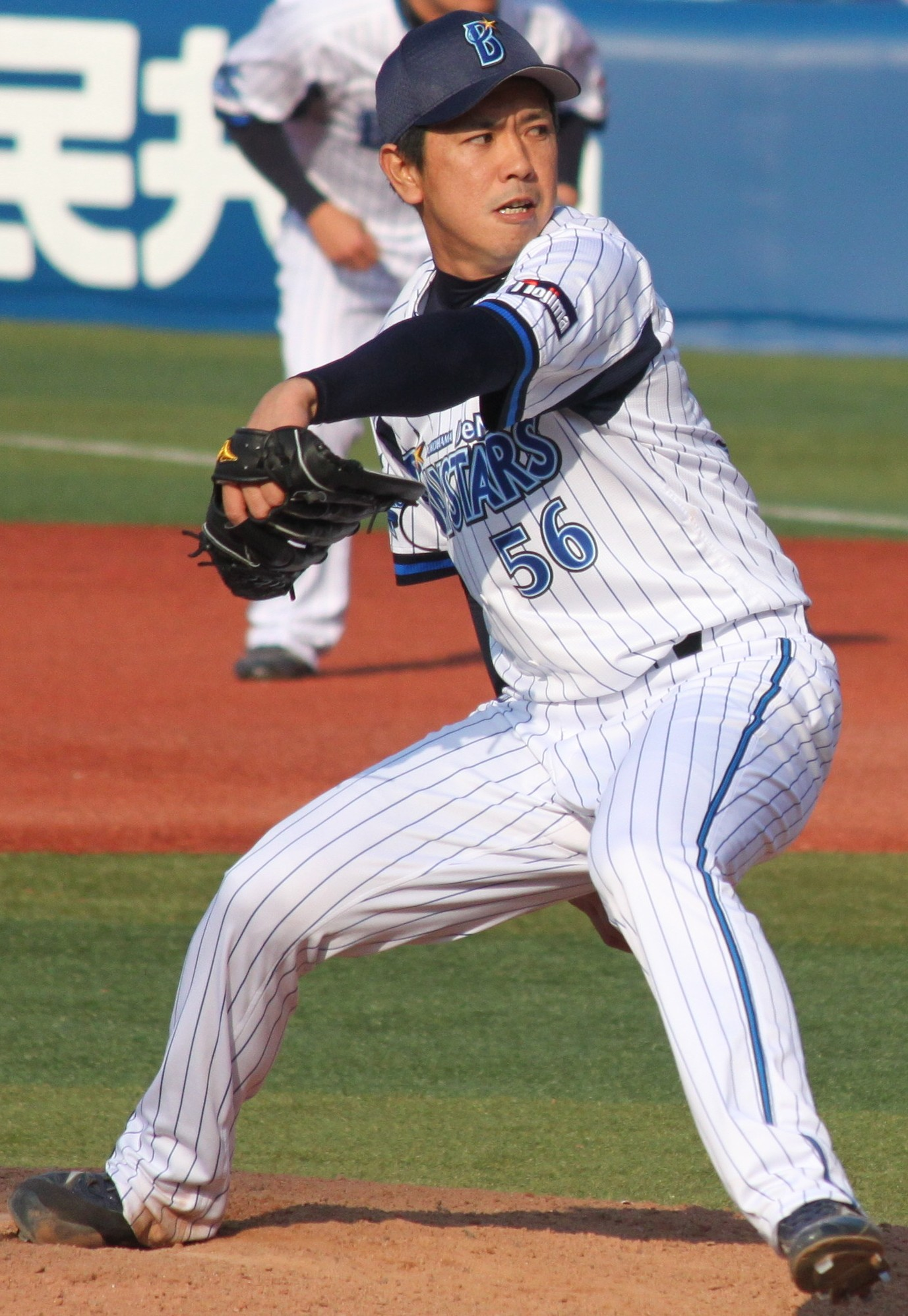
- Osada with the Yokohama DeNA BayStars

Saitama Seibu Lions – No. 90
- Pitcher / Coach
- Born: May 6, 1980 (age 45); Yokohama, Kanagawa, Japan
- Batted: Right Threw: Right

NPB debut
- March 28, 2003, for the Seibu Lions

Last NPB appearance
- July 29, 2016, for the Yokohama DeNA BayStars

NPB statistics (through 2016 season)
- Win–loss record: 25-25
- Earned run average: 4.14
- Strikeouts: 310
- Saves: 2
- Holds: 85

Teams
- As player: Seibu Lions/Saitama Seibu Lions (2003–2013); Yokohama DeNA BayStars (2013–2016); Niigata Albirex Baseball Club (2017); As coach: Saitama Musashi Heat Bears (2021); Saitama Seibu Lions (2022-present)

Shuichiro Osada (長田 秀一郎, Osada Shuichirō; born May 6, 1980 in Yokohama, Kanagawa, Japan) is a professional Japanese baseball player. He plays pitcher for the Niigata Albirex Baseball Club.
