= Kazuyoshi Tatsunami =

Japanese baseball player and manager (born 1969)

Kazuyoshi Tatsunami 立浪和義
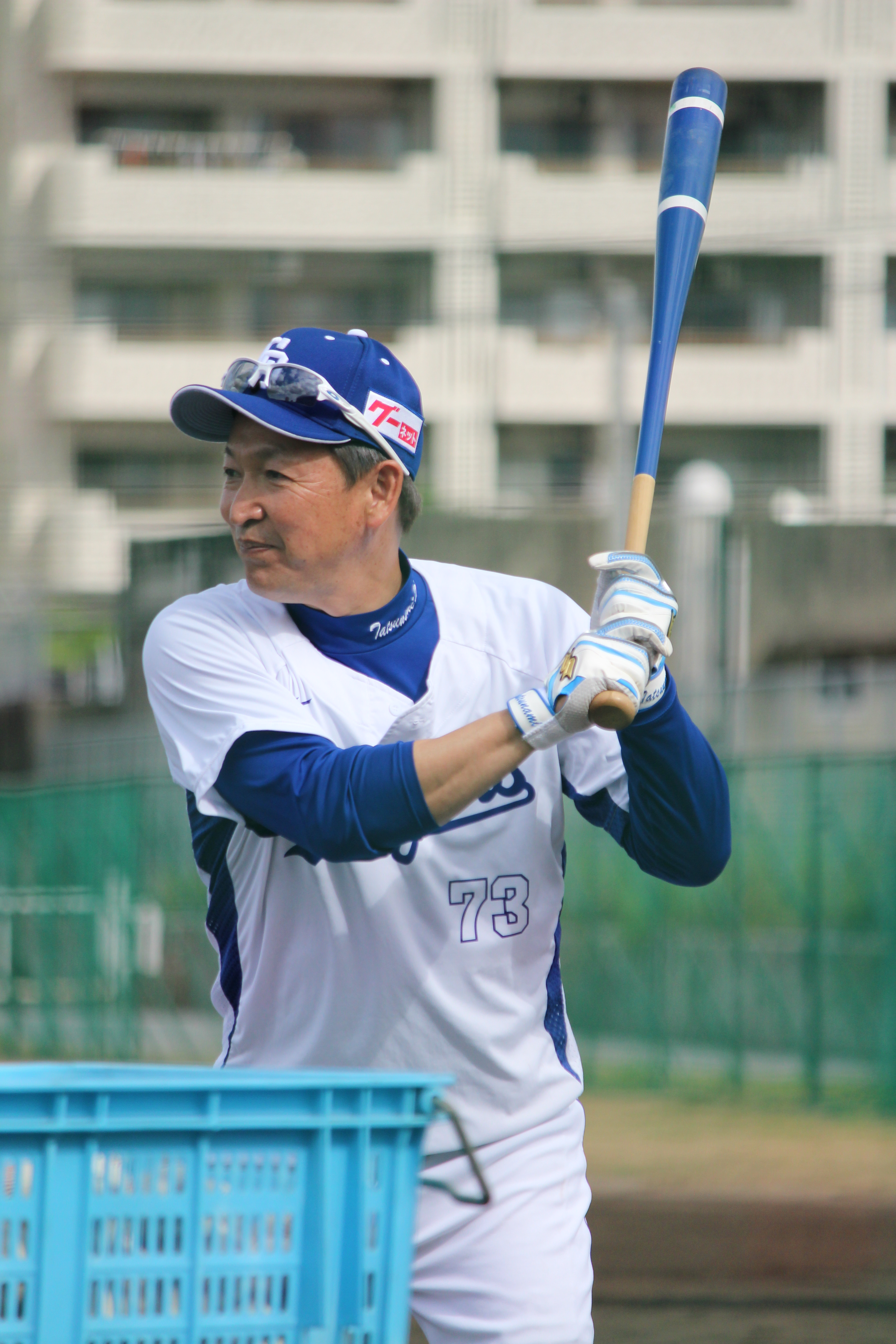
- Hitting grounders in Chatan, Okinawa, November 6, 2022
- Infielder / Manager
- Born: August 19, 1969 (age 56); Settsu, Osaka, Japan
- Batted: Left Threw: Right

NPB debut
- April 8, 1988, for the Chunichi Dragons

Last NPB appearance
- October 24, 2009, for the Chunichi Dragons

NPB statistics
- Batting average: .285
- Hits: 2,480
- Home runs: 171
- Runs batted in: 1,037
- Stats at Baseball Reference

Teams
- As player: Chunichi Dragons (1988–2009); As coach: Chunichi Dragons (2008–2009); As manager: Chunichi Dragons (2022–2024)

Career highlights and awards
- Japan Series Champion (2007); Central League Rookie of the Year (1988); 2× Best Nine Award (2B: 1996, 3B: 2004); 5× Golden Glove Award (SS: 1988, 2B: 1995-1997, 3B: 2003); 11× NPB All-Star (1988, 1991, 1994-1998, 2000, 2002-2004); 2× Most runs scored (1991, 1994); Most times on base (1996); Hit for the cycle (22 August 1997 vs Hanshin Tigers at Nagoya Dome)

Member of the Japanese

Baseball Hall of Fame
- Induction: 2019

Kazuyoshi Tatsunami (立浪 和義, Tatsunami Kazuyoshi; born August 19, 1969) is a former Japanese professional baseball infielder and manager. He played in Nippon Professional Baseball (NPB) for the Chunichi Dragons from 1988 to 2009. He was drafted in the first round in the 1987 NPB Draft.

== Career ==
=== Playing career ===
Tatsunami holds the all-time NPB double record with 487, and is a member of the Meikyukai (Association of Great Players, or Golden Players Club).

After the 2009 season, Tatsunami retired, having seen his skills and playing time diminish for the last few seasons. He retired with a career .285 batting average, 171 home runs, 1,037 RBI, and 2,480 hits.

On 15 January 2019, Tatsunami was inducted into the Japanese Baseball Hall of Fame for his achievements as a player.

=== Coaching career ===
On 13 October 2021, it was confirmed that Tatsunami has been approached to become the new manager of the Chunichi Dragons ahead of the 2022 NPB season. On 18 September 2024, Tatsunami announced that he would be resigning following the season after lackluster results with the team.

== See also ==
- List of Nippon Professional Baseball players with 1,000 runs batted in
- List of Nippon Professional Baseball career hits leaders
