= Tsutomu Itō =

Japanese baseball player and manager (born 1962)

Tsutomu Itō 伊東 勤
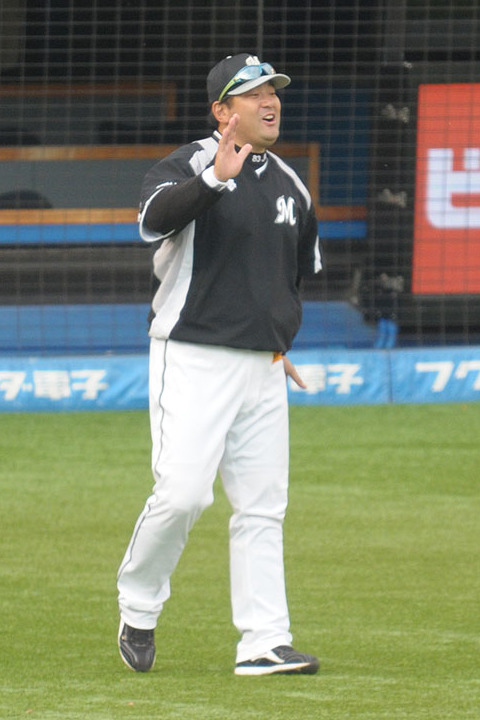
- Ito with the Chiba Lotte Marines
- Head Coach / Catcher
- Born: August 29, 1962 (age 63); Kumamoto, Japan
- Batted: Right Threw: Right

NPB debut
- April 11, 1982, for the Seibu Lions

Last appearance
- September 27, 2003, for the Seibu Lions

NPB statistics
- Batting average: .247
- Hits: 1738
- RBIs: 811
- Stats at Baseball Reference

Teams
- As player: Seibu Lions (1982 – 2003); As manager: Seibu Lions (2004 – 2007); Chiba Lotte Marines (2013 – 2017); As coach: Seibu Lions (2002 – 2003); Doosan Bears (2011 – 2012); Chunichi Dragons (2019 – 2021)

Career highlights and awards
- 16× NPB All-Star (1984 - 1998, 2002); 11× Mitsui Golden Glove Award (1985 - 1988, 1990 - 1992, 1994, 1995, 1997, 1998); 10× Best Nine Award (1985 - 1988, 1990 - 1992, 1997, 1998, 2002); Matsutaro Shoriki Award (2004)

Member of the Japanese

Baseball Hall of Fame
- Induction: 2017

Tsutomu Itō (伊東 勤, Itō Tsutomu; born August 29, 1962) is the former manager of Nippon Professional Baseball's Seibu Lions. He was the number 1 draft pick for the Seibu Lions in 1982 and went on to play for them until 2003. He was talented at leading pitcher, and led his team to winning 12 Pacific League championships and 10 Japan Series winners. After his retirement, he managed and led his team to the 2004 Japan Series championship.

On 30th October 2018, it was announced that Itō would be joining the Chunichi Dragons as head coach under new manager Tsuyoshi Yoda.

== Career statistics ==
Year	Team	Number	G	AB	R	H	2B	3B	HR	TB	RBI	SB	BB +HBP	SO	ABG (Place)
1982	Seibu Lions	27	33	33	3	8	3	0	0	11	1	0	3	3	.242	—
1983	Seibu Lions	27	56	108	22	21	3	0	0	24	6	3	22	19	.194	—
1984	Seibu Lions	27	113	345	44	98	15	1	10	145	44	20	49	46	.284	15th
1985	Seibu Lions	27	124	411	57	106	19	5	13	174	62	13	55	43	.258	30th
1986	Seibu Lions	27	129	418	59	98	20	3	11	157	40	18	41	70	.234	37th
1987	Seibu Lions	27	124	405	42	100	14	1	10	146	51	7	40	77	.247	26th
1988	Seibu Lions	27	129	429	51	108	16	5	11	167	56	2	51	68	.252	27th
1989	Seibu Lions	27	117	374	37	88	14	1	9	131	35	3	47	56	.235	32nd
1990	Seibu Lions	27	119	366	47	103	20	3	11	162	43	4	35	56	.281	12th
1991	Seibu Lions	27	124	392	51	83	17	0	8	124	44	3	40	59	.212	36th
1992	Seibu Lions	27	124	365	52	96	14	3	4	128	49	10	51	59	.263	27th
1993	Seibu Lions	27	128	401	36	90	15	1	7	128	39	6	48	63	.224	31st
1994	Seibu Lions	27	113	338	44	86	12	3	8	128	53	17	40	48	.254	23rd
1995	Seibu Lions	27	125	386	40	95	21	0	6	134	43	9	32	59	.246	22nd
1996	Seibu Lions	27	92	248	24	64	10	0	6	92	26	2	25	25	.258	—
1997	Seibu Lions	27	129	436	50	122	19	1	13	182	56	5	35	48	.280	20th
1998	Seibu Lions	27	114	325	34	79	11	2	8	118	38	4	34	42	.243	—
1999	Seibu Lions	27	95	258	27	74	10	1	3	95	24	1	25	35	.287	—
2000	Seibu Lions	27	94	245	21	52	9	0	5	76	19	3	24	48	.212	—
2001	Seibu Lions	27	106	236	15	48	5	1	2	61	20	1	38	41	.203	—
2002	Seibu Lions	27	118	341	29	87	12	1	8	125	50	3	29	48	.255	—
2003	Seibu Lions	27	73	190	13	32	7	0	3	48	12	0	12	31	.168	—
Career Total			2379	7050	798	1738	286	32	156	2556	811	134	776	1044	.247	—

== Titles and awards ==
- Best Nine : 10 times (1985–1988, 1990–1992, 1997–1998, 2002)
- Golden Glove : 11 times (1985–1988, 1990–1992, 1994–1995, 1997–1998)
- Commissioner's Award : (2003)
- All Star appearance : 16 times (1984–1998, 2002)
- 305 sacrifice bunts in career (Pacific League record)
