= 2006 Nippon Professional Baseball season =

2006 NPB season
- League: Nippon Professional Baseball
- Sport: Baseball
- Duration: March 25, 2006 – October 26, 2006

Regular season
- Season MVP: CL: Kosuke Fukudome (CHU); PL: Michihiro Ogasawara (NIP)

League postseason
- CL champions: Chunichi Dragons
- CL runners-up: Hanshin Tigers
- PL champions: Hokkaido Nippon Ham Fighters
- PL runners-up: Fukuoka SoftBank Hawks

Japan Series
- Venue: Sapporo Dome, Sapporo, Hokkaidō; Vantelin Dome Nagoya, Nagoya, Aichi
- Champions: Hokkaido Nippon-Ham Fighters
- Runners-up: Chunichi Dragons
- Finals MVP: Atsunori Inaba (NIP)

NPB seasons
- ← 2005 2007 →

In 2006 the Nippon Professional Baseball season ended with the Hokkaido Nippon-Ham Fighters of the Pacific League defeating the Chunichi Dragons of the Central League in the Japan Series.

== Format ==
=== Central League ===
- Season format
  - Regular season
- Regular season 1st place are the champions

=== Pacific League ===
- Season format
  - Regular season
  - Playoff 1st stage: Regular season 2nd place vs. regular season 3rd place – Best of 3
  - Playoff 2nd stage: Regular season 1st place vs. playoff 1st stage winners – Best of 5 (regular-season 1st place take a one-win advantage)
- Playoff 2nd stage winners are the champions

=== Japan Series ===
- Central League champions vs. Pacific League champions – Best of 7

== Standings ==
=== Central League ===
==== Regular season ====
Central League	G	W	L	T	Pct.	GB
Chunichi Dragons	146	87	54	5	.617	--
Hanshin Tigers	146	84	58	4	.592	3.5
Tokyo Yakult Swallows	146	70	73	3	.490	18
Yomiuri Giants	146	65	79	2	.451	23.5
Hiroshima Toyo Carp	146	62	79	5	.440	25
Yokohama BayStars	146	58	84	4	.408	29.5

=== Pacific League ===
==== Regular season ====
Pacific League	G	W	L	T	Pct.	GB
Hokkaido Nippon-Ham Fighters	136	82	54	0	.603	--
Seibu Lions	136	80	54	2	.597	1
Fukuoka SoftBank Hawks	136	75	56	5	.573	4.5
Chiba Lotte Marines	136	65	70	1	.481	16.5
Orix Buffaloes	136	52	81	3	.391	28.5
Tohoku Rakuten Golden Eagles	136	47	85	4	.356	33

==== Playoff 1st stage ====
Seibu Lions (1) vs. Fukuoka SoftBank Hawks (2)

Game	Score	Date	Location	Attendance
1	Fukuoka SoftBank Hawks – 0, Seibu Lions – 1	October 7	Invoice Seibu Dome	29,187
2	Fukuoka SoftBank Hawks – 11, Seibu Lions – 3	October 8	Invoice Seibu Dome	31,338
3	Fukuoka SoftBank Hawks – 6, Seibu Lions – 1	October 9	Invoice Seibu Dome	27,344

==== Playoff 2nd stage ====
Hokkaido Nippon-Ham Fighters (3) vs. Fukuoka Softbank Hawks (0) The Fighters have a one-game advantage.

Game	Score	Date	Location	Attendance
1	Fukuoka SoftBank Hawks – 1, Hokkaido Nippon Ham Fighters – 3	October 11	Sapporo Dome	42,380
2	Fukuoka SoftBank Hawks – 0, Hokkaido Nippon Ham Fighters – 1	October 12	Sapporo Dome	42,380

== Japan Series ==
It featured the Hokkaido Nippon-Ham Fighters, champions of the Pacific League, and the Chunichi Dragons, champions of the Central League. The series was played as a best-of-seven format and took place from October 21 to October 26, 2006.

The Hokkaido Nippon-Ham Fighters emerged victorious, defeating the Chunichi Dragons 4 games to 1 to secure their first Japan Series title since 1962. The series began at the Nagoya Dome, home of the Dragons, where the Fighters claimed a narrow victory in Game 1. The remaining games were held at the Sapporo Dome, where the Fighters capitalized on strong pitching and timely hitting to dominate the series.

Atsunori Inaba of the Fighters was named the Japan Series Most Valuable Player (MVP) for his exceptional performance throughout the series, which included critical offensive contributions and solid defensive play. The Fighters were managed by Trey Hillman, who became the first foreign manager to win the Japan Series since Bobby Valentine in 2005.

Following their Japan Series victory, the Fighters advanced to the Asian Series, representing NPB against other league champions from Asia to compete for the title of the top baseball team in the region.

== Awards ==
The Eiji Sawamura Award, the award given to the top pitcher in Japan, was given to pitcher Kazumi Saito of the Fukuoka SoftBank Hawks. He had a win–loss record of 18-5, 205 strikeouts, and an ERA of 1.75 in 201.0 innings, winning the Pacific League's pitching triple crown.

=== Best Nine Awards ===
Central League

Position	Player	Team
P	Kenshin Kawakami	Chunichi Dragons
C	Akihiro Yano	Hanshin Tigers
1B	Tyrone Woods	Chunichi Dragons
2B	Masahiro Araki	Chunichi Dragons
3B	Akinori Iwamura	Tokyo Yakult Swallows
SS	Hirokazu Ibata	Chunichi Dragons
OF	Norichika Aoki	Tokyo Yakult Swallows
OF	Kosuke Fukudome	Chunichi Dragons
OF	Tomoaki Kanemoto	Hanshin Tigers

Pacific League

Position	Player	Team
P	Kazumi Saitoh	Fukuoka SoftBank Hawks
C	Tomoya Satozaki	Chiba Lotte Marines
1B	Michihiro Ogasawara	Hokkaido Nippon-Ham Fighters
2B	Kensuke Tanaka	Hokkaido Nippon-Ham Fighters
3B	Jose Fernández	Tohoku Rakuten Golden Eagles
SS	Munenori Kawasaki	Fukuoka SoftBank Hawks
OF	Atsunori Inaba	Hokkaido Nippon-Ham Fighters
OF	Nobuhiko Matsunaka	Fukuoka SoftBank Hawks
OF	Kazuhiro Wada	Seibu Lions
DH	Fernando Seguignol	Hokkaido Nippon-Ham Fighters

=== Gold Gloves ===
Central League

Position	Player	Team
P	Kenshin Kawakami	Chunichi Dragons
C	Motonobu Tanishige	Chunichi Dragons
1B	Andy Sheets	Hanshin Tigers
2B	Masahiro Araki	Chunichi Dragons
3B	Akinori Iwamura	Tokyo Yakult Swallows
SS	Hirokazu Ibata	Chunichi Dragons
OF	Norihiro Akahoshi	Hanshin Tigers
OF	Norichika Aoki	Tokyo Yakult Swallows
OF	Kosuke Fukudome	Chunichi Dragons

Pacific League

Position	Player	Team
P	Daisuke Matsuzaka	Seibu Lions
C	Tomoya Satozaki	Chiba Lotte Marines
1B	Michihiro Ogasawara	Hokkaido Nippon-Ham Fighters
2B	Kensuke Tanaka	Hokkaido Nippon-Ham Fighters
3B	Toshiaki Imae	Chiba Lotte Marines
SS	Munenori Kawasaki	Fukuoka SoftBank Hawks
OF	Atsunori Inaba	Hokkaido Nippon-Ham Fighters
OF	Hichori Morimoto	Hokkaido Nippon-Ham Fighters
OF	SHINJO	Hokkaido Nippon-Ham Fighters

== See also ==
- 2006 Major League Baseball season
