= 2004 Nippon Professional Baseball season =

2004 NPB season
- League: Nippon Professional Baseball
- Sport: Baseball
- Duration: March 27, 2004 – October 25, 2004

Regular season
- Season MVP: CL: Kenshin Kawakami (CHU); PL: Nobuhiko Matsunaka (DAI)

League postseason
- CL champions: Chunichi Dragons
- CL runners-up: Yakult Swallows
- PL champions: Seibu Lions
- PL runners-up: Fukuoka Daiei Hawks

Japan Series
- Champions: Seibu Lions
- Runners-up: Chunichi Dragons
- Finals MVP: Takashi Ishii (SEI)

NPB seasons
- ← 2003 2005 →

The 2004 Nippon Professional Baseball season was the 55th season of operation for Nippon Professional Baseball (NPB). For the first time since 1982, the Pacific League instituted a playoff system to determine its representative to the Japan Series, in which the second-place and third-place teams would compete against each other for the right to play the regular season champion; previously, the league had a split-season playoff that would match the first-place team of the first and second half of the season from 1973 to 1982. The Pacific League regular season champion Fukuoka Daiei Hawks became part of dubious history when they subsequently lost to the Seibu Lions in five games to become the first regular season champion of the league to not reach the championship series. The Japan Series ended with the Seibu Lions defeating the Chunichi Dragons in the 2004 Japan Series. This season also saw the first and only players strike in Japanese professional baseball history. Players went on strike for two days in September because of the potential mergers and realignment. The result was that the Pacific League saw the Tohoku Rakuten Golden Eagles be created as an expansion team for 2005 while the Osaka Kintetsu Buffaloes and Orix BlueWave would merge to form the Orix Buffaloes.

== Format ==
=== Central League ===
- Season format
  - Regular season
- Regular season 1st place is the champion

=== Pacific League ===
- Season format
  - Regular season
  - Playoff 1st stage: Regular season 2nd place vs. regular season 3rd place – Best of 3
  - Playoff 2nd stage: Regular season 1st place vs. playoff 1st stage winner – Best of 5
- Playoff 2nd stage winner is the champion

=== Japan Series ===
- Central League champion vs. Pacific League champion – Best of 7

== Standings ==
Note:Two games for each team are cancelled due to players' strike

=== Central League ===
==== Regular season ====
Central League	G	W	L	T	Pct.	GB
Chunichi Dragons	138	79	56	3	.583	—
Yakult Swallows	138	72	64	2	.529	7.5
Yomiuri Giants	138	71	64	3	.525	8.0
Hanshin Tigers	138	66	70	2	.485	13.0
Hiroshima Toyo Carp	138	60	77	1	.438	20.0
Yokohama BayStars	138	59	76	3	.438	20.0

=== Pacific League ===
==== Regular season ====
Pacific League	G	W	L	T	Pct.	GB
Fukuoka Daiei Hawks	133	77	52	4	.594	—
Seibu Lions	133	74	58	1	.560	4.5
Hokkaido Nippon-Ham Fighters	133	66	65	2	.504	12.0
Chiba Lotte Marines	133	65	65	3	.500	12.5
Osaka Kintetsu Buffaloes	133	61	70	2	.466	17.0
Orix BlueWave	133	49	72	2	.376	29.0

==== Playoff 1st stage ====
Seibu Lions (2) vs. Hokkaido Nippon-Ham Fighters (1)

Game	Score	Date	Location
1	Hokkaido Nippon-Ham Fighters – 7, Seibu Lions – 10	October 1	Seibu Dome
2	Hokkaido Nippon-Ham Fighters – 5, Seibu Lions – 4	October 2	Seibu Dome
3	Hokkaido Nippon-Ham Fighters – 5, Seibu Lions – 6	October 3	Seibu Dome

==== Playoff 2nd stage ====
Fukuoka Daiei Hawks (2) vs. Seibu Lions (3)

Game	Score	Date	Location
1	Seibu Lions – 3, Fukuoka Daiei Hawks – 9	October 6	Fukuoka Dome
2	Seibu Lions – 11, Fukuoka Daiei Hawks – 1	October 7	Fukuoka Dome
3	Seibu Lions – 6, Fukuoka Daiei Hawks – 5	October 9	Fukuoka Dome
4	Seibu Lions – 1, Fukuoka Daiei Hawks – 4	October 10	Fukuoka Dome
5	Seibu Lions – 4, Fukuoka Daiei Hawks – 3 (10 innings)	October 11	Fukuoka Dome

== Japan Series ==
Chunichi Dragons (3) vs. Seibu Lions (4)

Game	Score	Date	Location	Attendance
1	Dragons – 0, Lions – 2	October 16	Nagoya Dome	37,909
2	Dragons – 11, Lions – 6	October 17	Nagoya Dome	37,969
3	Lions – 10, Dragons – 8	October 19	Seibu Dome	23,910
4	Lions – 2, Dragons – 8	October 21	Seibu Dome	29,073
5	Lions – 1, Dragons – 6	October 22	Seibu Dome	31,526
6	Dragons – 2, Lions – 4	October 24	Nagoya Dome	38,120
7	Dragons – 2, Lions – 7	October 25	Nagoya Dome	38,050

== See also ==
- 2004 Major League Baseball season
- 2004
