= Katsuyuki Dobashi =

Japanese baseball player and coach

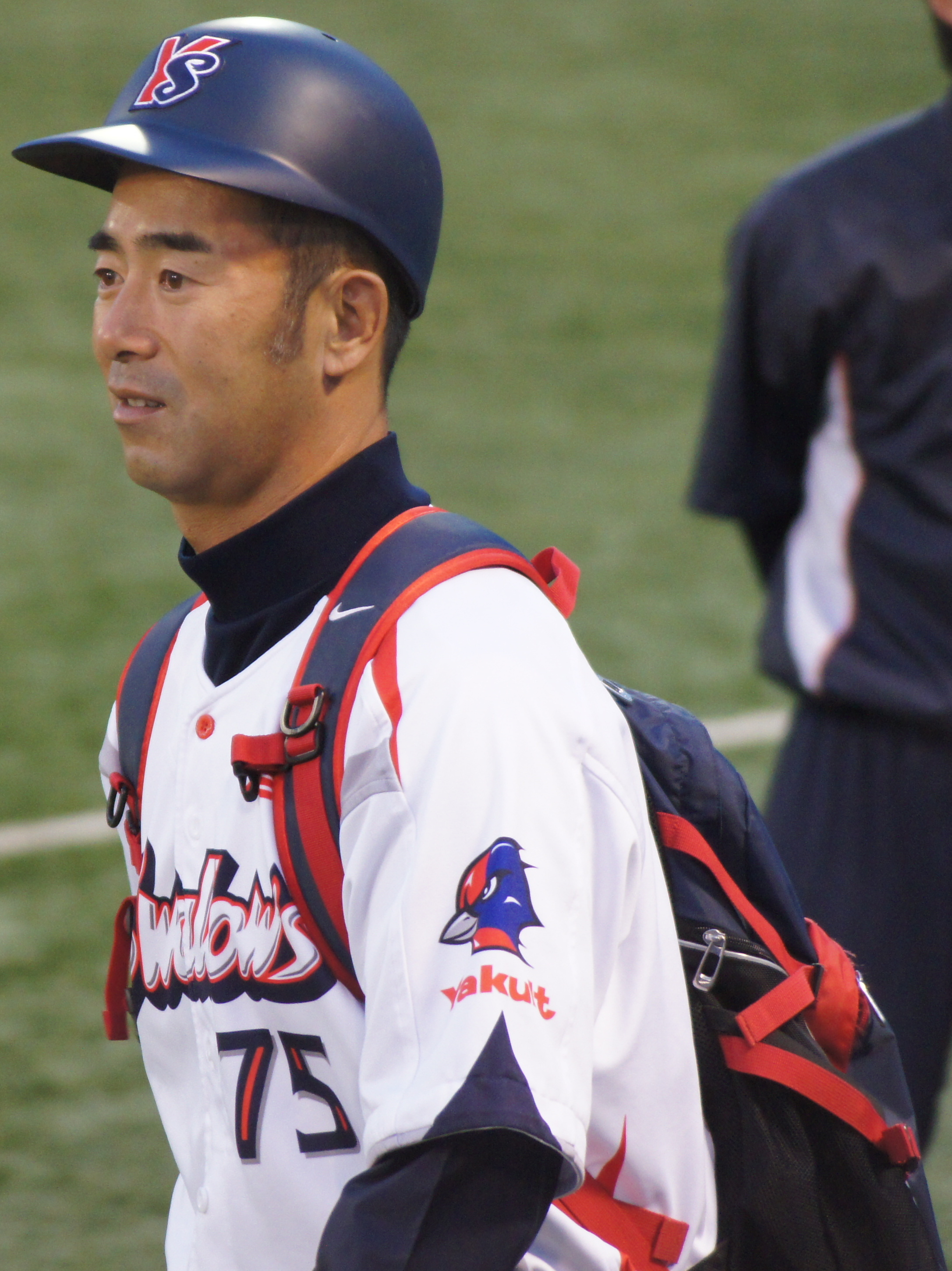

Tokyo Yakult Swallows – No. 95
- Infielder / Coach
- Born: December 5, 1968 (age 56); Funabashi, Chiba, Japan
- Batted: Right Threw: Right

NPB debut
- October 21, 1987, for the Yakult Swallows

Last NPB appearance
- October 15, 2006, for the Tokyo Yakult Swallows

NPB statistics (through 2006)
- Batting average: .266
- Home runs: 79
- Hits: 1,121

Teams
- As player: Yakult Swallows/Tokyo Yakult Swallows (1987–2006); As coach: Tokyo Yakult Swallows (2007–2015, 2018–)

Career highlights and awards
- 4× Japan Series champion (1993, 1995, 1997, 2001); 1× NPB All-Star (1995)
- Last updated on: 19 January 2014

Katsuyuki Dobashi (土橋 勝征, Dobashi Katsuyuki; born December 5, 1968 in Funabashi, Chiba, Japan) is a former Nippon Professional Baseball infielder.
