= Mitsuru Manaka =

Japanese baseball player and manager (born 1971)

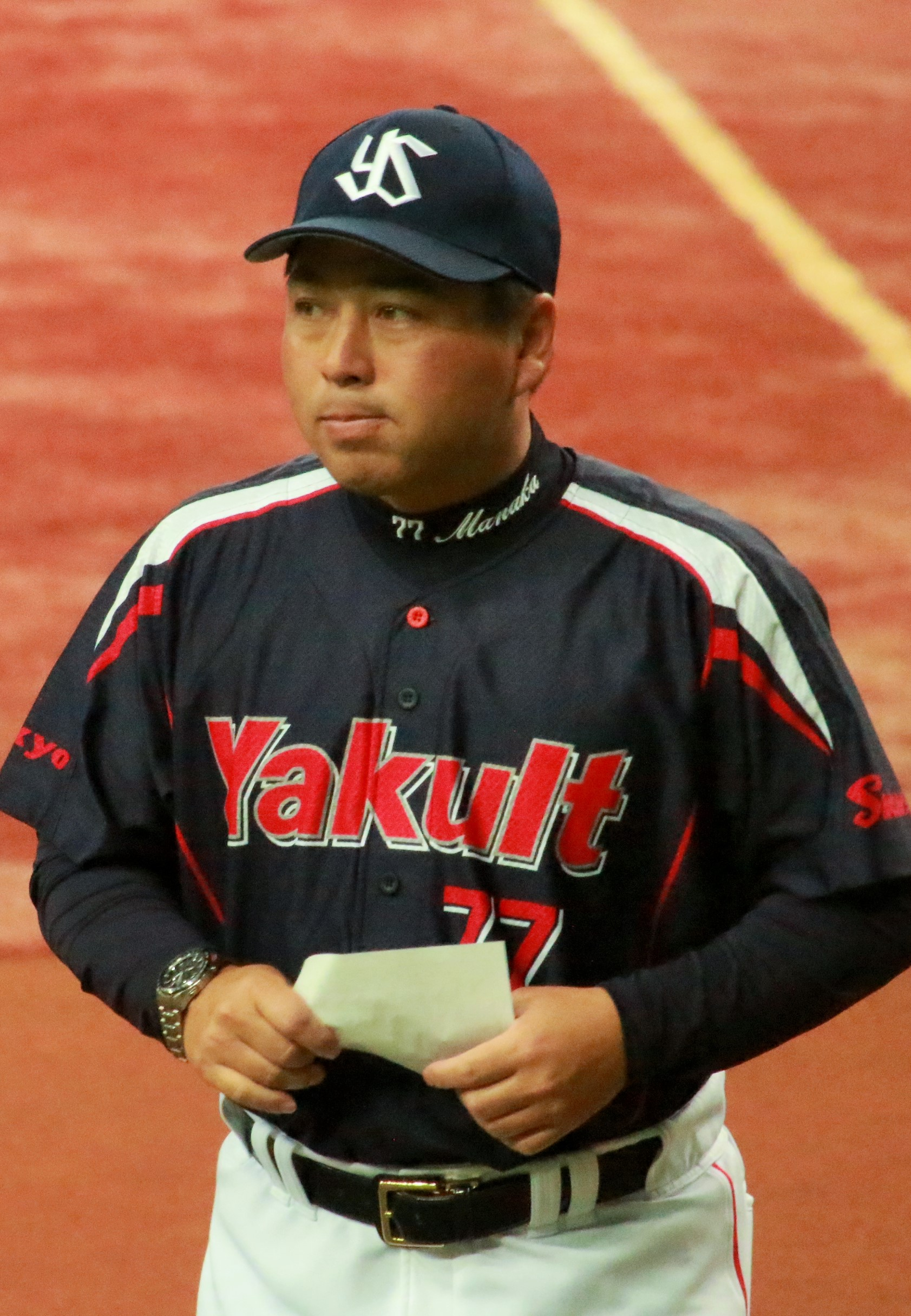
- Outfielder / Manager
- Born: January 6, 1971 (age 54); Tochigi, Tochigi, Japan
- Batted: Left Threw: Left

NPB debut
- September 3, 1993, for the Yakult Swallows

Last NPB appearance
- October 12, 2008, for the Tokyo Yakult Swallows

NPB statistics (through 2008)
- Batting average: .286
- Home runs: 54
- Hits: 1122
- RBI: 335
- Stolen base: 64
- Stats at Baseball Reference

Teams
- As player: Yakult Swallows/Tokyo Yakult Swallows (1993–2008); As manager: Tokyo Yakult Swallows (2015–2017); As coach: Tokyo Yakult Swallows (2009–2014)

Career highlights and awards
- Japan Series champion (1993, 1995, 1997, 2001); 1× NPB All-Star (2001)
- Last updated on: 9 May 2020

Mitsuru Manaka (真中 満, born January 6, 1971, in Tochigi, Tochigi, Japan) is a former Nippon Professional Baseball outfielder. On October 8, 2014, he was named manager of the Tokyo Yakult Swallows, replacing Junji Ogawa. Manaka had previously been managing the Swallows' farm team.
