= Takahiro Ikeyama =

Japanese baseball player and coach

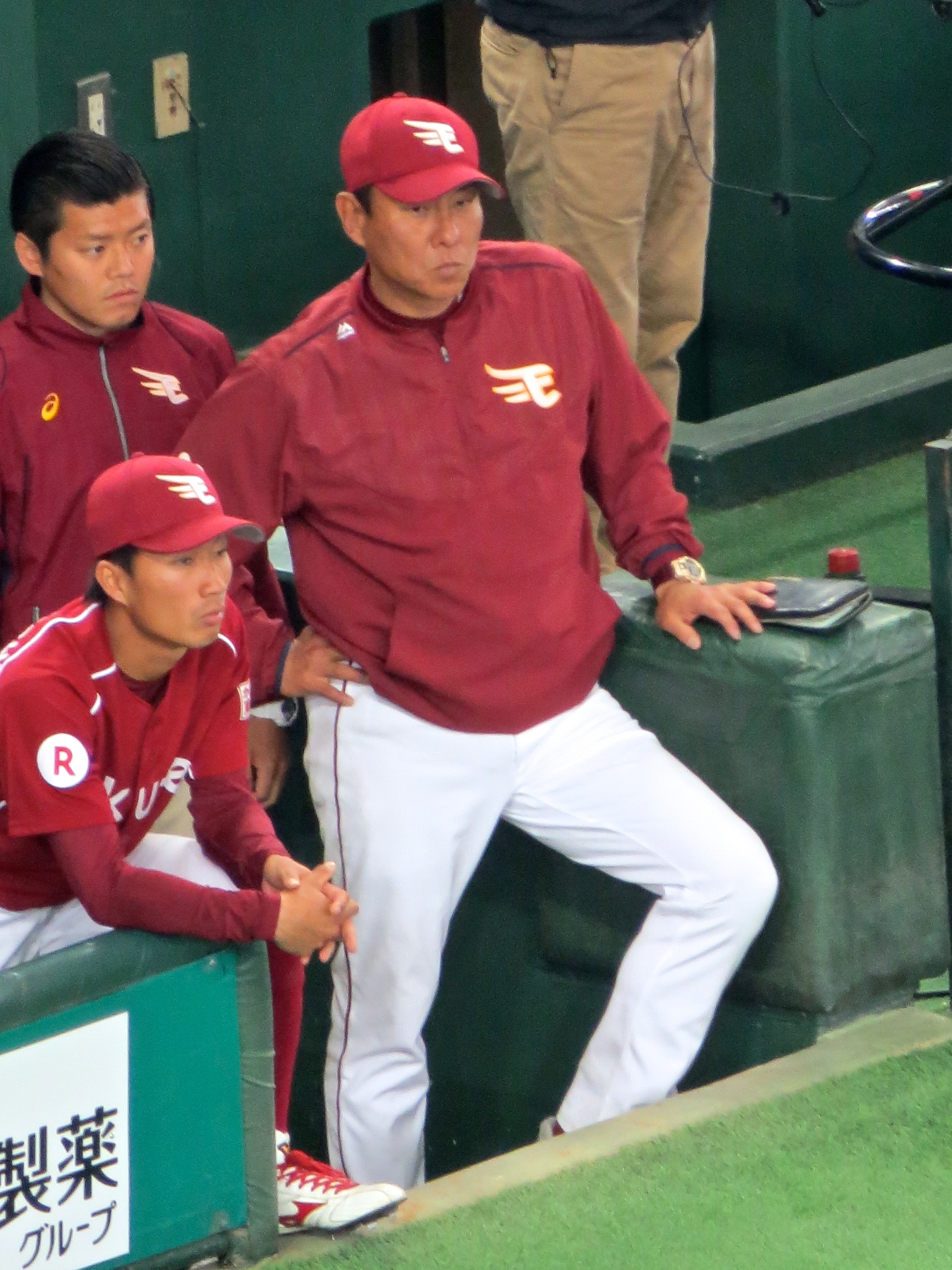

Tokyo Yakult Swallows – No. 88
- Shortstop, Third baseman / Manager
- Born: December 17, 1965 (age 60); Amagasaki, Hyōgo, Japan
- Batted: Right Threw: Right

NPB debut
- October 9, 1984, for the Yakult Swallows

Last NPB appearance
- October 17, 2002, for the Yakult Swallows

NPB statistics
- Batting average: .262
- Home runs: 304
- Runs batted in: 898
- Stats at Baseball Reference

Teams
- As player: Yakult Swallows (1984–2002); As manager: Tokyo Yakult Swallows (2026–present); As coach: Tohoku Rakuten Golden Eagles (2006–2009, 2016–2018); Tokyo Yakult Swallows (2011–2015, 2020–2025)

Career highlights and awards
- 4× Japan Series champion (1993, 1995, 1997, 2001); 5× Central League Best Nine Award (1988–1990, 1992–1993); Central League Golden Glove Award (1992); 7× NPB All-Star (1988–1992, 1994, 1998)
- Last updated on: 9 January 2019

Takahiro Ikeyama (池山 隆寛, Ikeyama Takahiro; born December 17, 1965 in Amagasaki, Hyōgo, Japan) is a Japanese former professional baseball infielder who currently serves as the manager for the Tokyo Yakult Swallows of Nippon Professional Baseball (NPB). A slugging shortstop, Ikeyama played in NPB for the Swallows from 1984 to 2002.

== Career ==
Ikeyama was a five-time Central League Best Nine Award-winner and a seven-time NPB All-Star. He won the 1992 Central League Golden Glove Award.

Ikeyama was part of the Central League-champion Swallows team that lost the 1992 Japan Series to Seibu. He was a member of the 1993, 1995, 1997, and 2001 Swallows squads that won the Japan Series those years.

Some years after retiring as a player, Ikeyama joined the coaching staff of the Tohoku Rakuten Golden Eagles; he has been a coach with the Swallows since 2011.

Jim Albright, an expert on Japanese professional baseball, ranks Ikeyama as among the top shortstops in NPB history, on the Swallows' franchise all-star team, on the 1990s Central League all-star team, and on the overall 1990s all-star team.

On October 9, 2025, the Tokyo Yakult Swallows announced Ikeyama as their new manager, succeeding Shingo Takatsu.

== See also ==
- List of top Nippon Professional Baseball home run hitters
