= 2013 Tokyo Yakult Swallows season =

Japanese baseball tournament season

2013 Tokyo Yakult Swallows
- League: Central League
- Ballpark: Meiji Jingu Stadium
- Record: 57-83-4 (.407)
- League place: 6th
- Parent company: Yakult Honsha
- Manager: Junji Ogawa

The 2013 Tokyo Yakult Swallows season was the 63rd season of the franchise of Nippon Professional Baseball, their 50th season at Meiji Jingu Stadium, and their 49th under Yakult Honsha. This season was notable because outfielder Wladimir Balentien broke Sadaharu Oh's single season home-run record, hitting 60 home runs. Balentien also broke the All-Asian single season record set by former Samsung Lions first baseman Lee Seung-yuop, both in the same game by hitting his 56th and 57th home runs in a game against the Hanshin Tigers. This was also the Swallows' 4th season under manager Junji Ogawa, and the last one of his first stint as manager.

The Tokyo Yakult Swallows drew an average home attendance of 19,898 in 72 home games in the 2013 NPB season. The total attendance was 1,432,695.

== Regular season ==
The Swallows finished last, with a 57-83-4 record, 28-and-a-half games back of the first place Yomiuri Giants.

Central League standings
Team	G	W	L	T	Pct.	GB
Yomiuri Giants	144	84	53	7	.613	—
Hanshin Tigers	144	73	67	4	.521	12.5
Hiroshima Toyo Carp	144	69	72	3	.489	17.0
Chunichi Dragons	144	64	77	3	.454	22.0
Yokohama DeNA BayStars	144	64	79	1	.448	23.0
Tokyo Yakult Swallows	144	57	83	4	.407	28.5
