= 1995 Japan Series =

Team (Wins)	Managers	Season
Yakult Swallows (4)	Katsuya Nomura	82–48, .631, GA: 8
Orix BlueWave (1)	Akira Ohgi	82–47–1, .636, GA: 12
- Dates: October 21–26
- MVP: Tom O'Malley (YKS)
- FSA: Hiroshi Kobayashi (ORX)

Broadcast
- Television: KTV (Game 1), MBS (Game 2),TBS (Game 3),Fuji TV (Game 4 -), NHK BS1 (Game 4)
- Radio: NHK Radio 1, TBS (JRN), JOQR (NRN), JOLF (NRN), Radio Nippon

The 1995 Japan Series was the championship series of Nippon Professional Baseball (NPB) for the 1995 season. The 46th edition of the Series, it was a best-of-seven playoff that matched the Pacific League champion Orix BlueWave against the Central League champion Yakult Swallows. The series was the second time the two franchises played each other for the championship; however, the last time the two teams played, Orix was known as the Hankyu Braves. Played at Green Stadium Kobe and Meiji Jingu Stadium, the Swallows defeated the BlueWave four games to one in the best-of-seven series to win the franchise's 3rd Japan Series title. Regular-season MVP Tom O'Malley was named Most Valuable Player of the series. The series was played between October 21 and October 26, 1995, with home field advantage going to the Central League.

== Summary ==
CL Yakult Swallows (4) vs. PL Orix BlueWave (1)

Game	Date	Score	Location	Time	Attendance
1	October 21	Yakult Swallows – 5, Orix BlueWave – 2	Green Stadium Kobe	3:14	32,486
2	October 22	Yakult Swallows – 3, Orix BlueWave – 2	Green Stadium Kobe	3:50	32,475
3	October 24	Orix BlueWave – 4, Yakult Swallows – 7	Meiji Jingu Stadium	4:25	32,915
4	October 25	Orix BlueWave – 2, Yakult Swallows – 1	Meiji Jingu Stadium	4:38	32,911
5	October 26	Orix BlueWave – 1, Yakult Swallows – 3	Meiji Jingu Stadium	3:14	33,112

== Matchups ==
=== Game 1 ===
Saturday, October 21, 1995 6:11 pm (JST) at Green Stadium Kobe, Kobe, Hyōgo
Team	1	2	3	4	5	6	7	8	9	R	H	E
Yakult	0	1	0	0	2	0	0	2	0	5	13	1
Orix	0	0	0	1	0	1	0	0	0	2	6	0
WP: Terry Bross (1–0) LP: Yoshinori Sato (0–1) Sv: Shingo Takatsu (1); Home runs: YKS: Yuji Ono (1); ORX: None

=== Game 2 ===
Sunday, October 22, 1995 6:11 pm (JST) at Green Stadium Kobe, Kobe, Hyōgo
Team	1	2	3	4	5	6	7	8	9	10	11	R	H	E
Yakult	0	0	0	0	0	0	0	2	0	0	1	3	11	1
Orix	0	1	0	0	1	0	0	0	0	0	0	2	4	0
WP: Futoshi Yamabe (1–0) LP: Masafumi Hirai (0–1); Home runs: YKS: Tom O'Malley (1); ORX: Doug Jennings (1)

=== Game 3 ===
Tuesday, October 24, 1995 6:33 pm (JST) at Meiji Jingu Stadium, Shinjuku, Tokyo
Team	1	2	3	4	5	6	7	8	9	10	R	H	E
Orix	0	0	0	0	1	0	3	0	0	0	4	8	0
Yakult	1	0	0	0	1	0	0	1	1	3	7	12	0
WP: Shingo Takatsu (1–0) LP: Masafumi Hirai (0–2); Home runs: ORX: None; YKS: Hensley Meulens (1), Takahiro Ikeyama (1)

=== Game 4 ===
Wednesday, October 25, 1995 6:33 pm (JST) at Meiji Jingu Stadium, Shinjuku, Tokyo
Team	1	2	3	4	5	6	7	8	9	10	11	12	R	H	E
Orix	0	0	0	0	0	0	0	0	1	0	0	1	2	12	0
Yakult	0	0	0	0	1	0	0	0	0	0	0	0	1	5	0
WP: Hiroshi Kobayashi (1–0) LP: Akimitsu Itoh (0–1); Home runs: ORX: Hirofumi Ogawa (1), Doug Jennings (2); YKS: None

=== Game 5 ===
Thursday, October 26, 1995 6:33 pm (JST) at Meiji Jingu Stadium, Shinjuku, Tokyo
Team	1	2	3	4	5	6	7	8	9	R	H	E
Orix	1	0	0	0	0	0	0	0	0	1	7	2
Yakult	0	2	0	0	1	0	0	0	X	3	7	0
WP: Terry Bross (2–0) LP: Koichi Takahashi (0–1) Sv: Shingo Takatsu (2); Home runs: ORX: Ichiro Suzuki (1); YKS: Tom O'Malley (2)

== See also ==
- 1995 World Series
