= Atsuya Furuta =

Japanese baseball player and player-manager

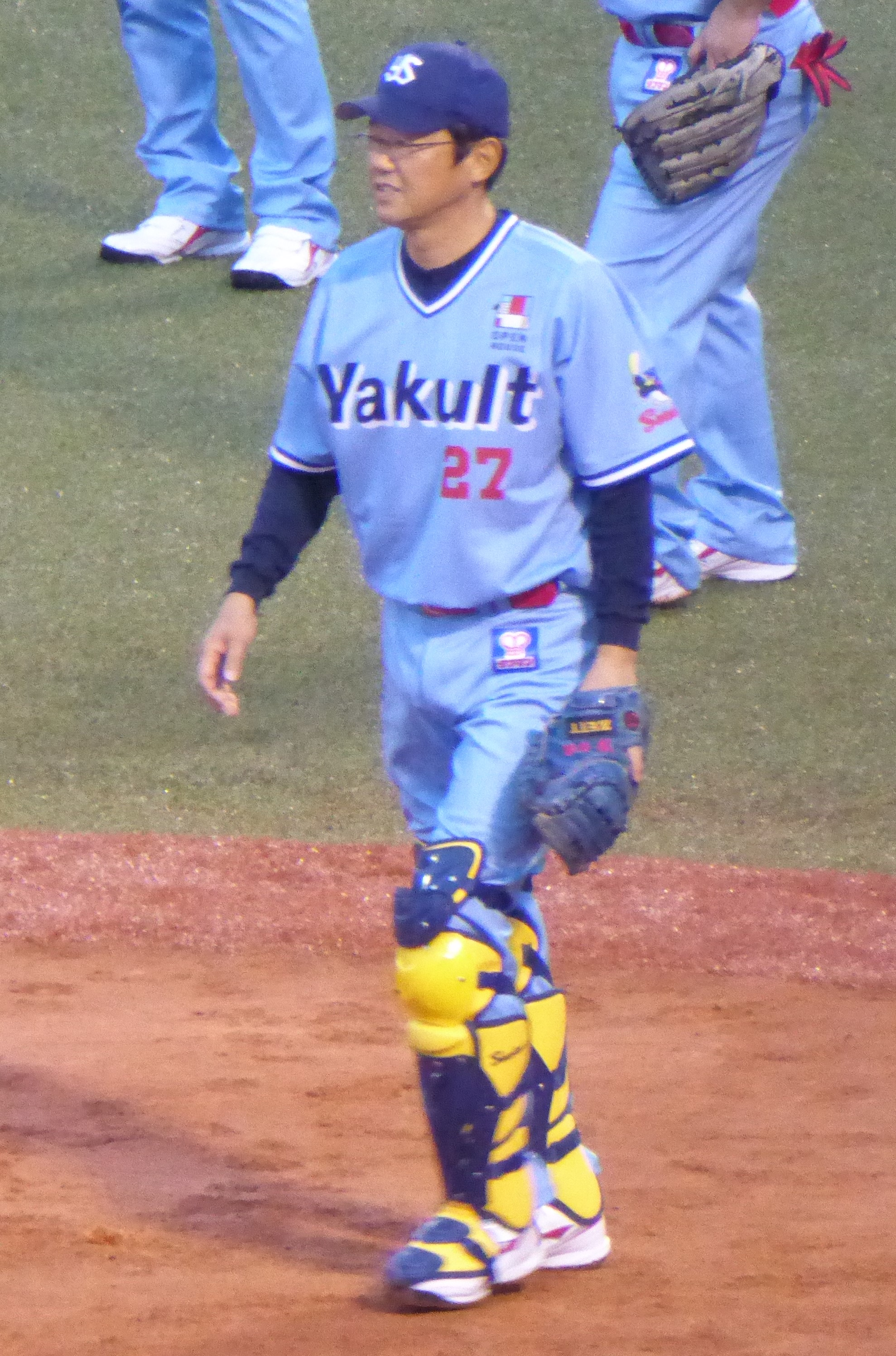
- Catcher/Manager
- Born: August 6, 1965 (age 60); Kawanishi, Hyōgo, Japan
- Batted: Right Threw: Right

debut
- April 11, 1990, for the Yakult Swallows

Last appearance
- October 9, 2007, for the Tokyo Yakult Swallows

Career statistics
- Batting average: .294
- Home runs: 217
- Hits: 2,097
- Runs batted in: 1,009
- Stats at Baseball Reference

Teams
- As player: Yakult Swallows/Tokyo Yakult Swallows (1990–2007); As manager: Tokyo Yakult Swallows (2006–2007)

Career highlights and awards
- 2× Central League MVP (1993, 1997); 2× Japan Series MVP (1997, 2001); 4x Japan Series champion (1993, 1995, 1997, 2001); Matsutaro Shoriki Award (1997); Tokyo Yakult Swallows #27 retired

Member of the Japanese

Baseball Hall of Fame
- Induction: 2015
Medals
Men's baseball
Representing Japan
Olympic Games
Silver medal – second place	1988 Seoul	Team
Asian Baseball Championship
Silver medal – second place	1999 Seoul	Team
Intercontinental Cup
Silver medal – second place	1989 San Juan	Team

Atsuya Furuta (古田 敦也, b. August 6, 1965) is a Japanese former baseball player and player-manager for the Tokyo Yakult Swallows professional baseball club in the Nippon Professional Baseball's Central League. Drafted in the 2nd round in 1990, Furuta became a leader for the Swallows as a catcher and became the first player-manager in Japanese baseball in 29 years, since Katsuya Nomura in 1977. In addition to his skills on the field, he is also known for leading a successful two-day strike in 2004 as the head of the Japanese baseball players union.

He remains one of the most prominent figures in Japanese baseball because of his leadership both on and off the field. In June 2007, Furuta removed himself from the active roster so he could focus on managing the floundering Swallows. He retired as player and manager in the same season.

== Biography ==
Furuta graduated from Kawanishi Meihou High School and Ritsumeikan University before entering the Toyota company baseball team in 1988. He was chosen as part of the Japanese Olympic team in 1988 for the Seoul Olympics, and won a silver medal.

The Yakult Swallows drafted Furuta in the second round of the 1990 draft. He became the team's starting catcher in his first season. In the 1991 all star game, he threw out three runners attempting to steal in one inning, receiving the all star MVP award. He has appeared in the all star game every single year of his career. The same year, he also beat Hiromitsu Ochiai to win the batting title (.340 batting average). He also hit a cycle in the 1992 all star game, receiving the all star MVP award again. In the 1995 Japanese championship series, he outsmarted batting champion Ichiro Suzuki, leading his team to victory. In 1997, he won the season MVP award for leading his team to another championship.

On June 28, 2003, Furuta hit home runs in 4 consecutive at bats, tying the Japanese record. He got his 2000th hit on April 24, 2005, which is the 32nd Japanese player, the second catcher (after Katsuya Nomura), and the first-ever player drafted from university/company team to reach such achievement. In 2004, he led the first player strike in Japanese baseball history, in opposition to the elimination of the Osaka Kintetsu Buffaloes team. In 2006, he agreed to become a player-manager for the Tokyo Yakult Swallows, the first in 29 years, after his mentor, Katsuya Nomura. His team had a record of 70-73-3 in 2006, placing in third, but Furuta's own statistics were easily his career worst. He was given the largest salary decrease in Japanese baseball history after the season (his player contract and manager contract are separate, where the player contract is shorter), but he remained a player-manager for the 2007 season. He retired from baseball both as a player and as a manager at the end of 2007.

Though his hitting and defensive skills eroded over the years due to age and many injuries, Furuta was by far the best catcher in Japan during his prime, tirelessly analyzing opposing batters, and throwing out many base stealers during his career. His percentage of base stealers thrown out was above .600 in 1993 and 2000, a phenomenal percentage. He also contributed significantly with the bat, winning a batting title, and having eight seasons with a batting average over .300 (the most among Japanese catchers). He has also caught two no-hit games: Terry Bross in 1995, and Kazuhisa Ishii in 1997.

Furuta developed many of his skills under the tutelage of legendary catcher Katsuya Nomura, who was also his manager in the 1990s when the Swallows were one of the most feared teams in Japan, winning three Japan Series championships in that decade. Something else the two had in common was that both were player-managers: Nomura for the then-Nankai Hawks, and Furuta for Yakult. The two would face off as managers during the 2006 interleague tournament, and Furuta got the better of his mentor, winning five out of the six games between Yakult and the 2nd-year Tohoku Rakuten Golden Eagles.

== The Japanese baseball strike ==
The strike took place over two days, from September 18 to September 19, 2004. It was the first strike in the history of Japanese professional baseball. The strike arose from a dispute that took place between the owners of the 12 professional Japanese baseball teams and the players union (which Furuta was the union's leader on that time), concerning the merging of the Osaka Kintetsu Buffaloes and the Orix Blue Wave. The owners wanted to get rid of the financially defunct Buffaloes, and merge the two baseball leagues which had been placed in Japan since 1958, since teams in the Central League saw much higher profits than the Pacific League, having popular teams such as the Yomiuri Giants and Hanshin Tigers. A battle escalated between the players union and the owners, and reached its height when Yomiuri Giants owner Tsuneo Watanabe controversially remarked that Furuta was "a mere player," implying that players had no say in what league would look like the next year. The strike was originally planned in all Saturday and Sunday games on that month, starting from September 11, 2004, but was pushed back due to the agreement of another meeting between the union and the owners on September 10, 2004. The players went on strike the following week when no progress was made in the negotiations.

The strike immediately led to a compromise between the two groups. Although the Buffaloes were merged with the Blue Wave (and formed into Orix Buffaloes) after the incident, the Tohoku Rakuten Golden Eagles were newly created to keep the former six team league structure. The dispute received huge press coverage (which mostly favored Furuta and the players union) and was dubbed one of the biggest events in the history of Japanese baseball. Proposals and amendments concerning inter-league games, player drafting, and management were also discussed between the players union and the owners during this period. The dispute officially ended after the two groups reached on consensus on September 23, 2004.

== Role in the Baseball Players Union ==
Furuta has made a huge impact in the Japanese Baseball Players Union, increasing the rights of players, and mending relationships between the professional leagues and the amateur baseball association in Japan. The baseball strike in 2004 became a nationwide event, and fans of all teams cheered for Furuta when he appeared following the strike. Furuta was the leader of the players union from 1998 to 2005, stepping down after becoming a player-manager in 2006.

== Awards and accomplishments ==
- MVP (1993, 1997)
- Batting Title (1991)
- Best Nine Award (1991~1993, 1995, 1997, 1999~2001, 2004)
- Golden Glove Award (1990~1993, 1995, 1997, 1999~2001, 2004)
- Championship Series MVP (1997, 2001)
- All Star (1990~2006)
- 1988 Seoul Olympics silver medalist

== See also ==
- Katsuya Nomura
- Shingo Takatsu
- Kazuhisa Ishii
- Masato Yoshii
- List of Nippon Professional Baseball players with 1,000 runs batted in
- List of Nippon Professional Baseball career hits leaders
