= Noriyuki Shiroishi =

Japanese baseball player and coach

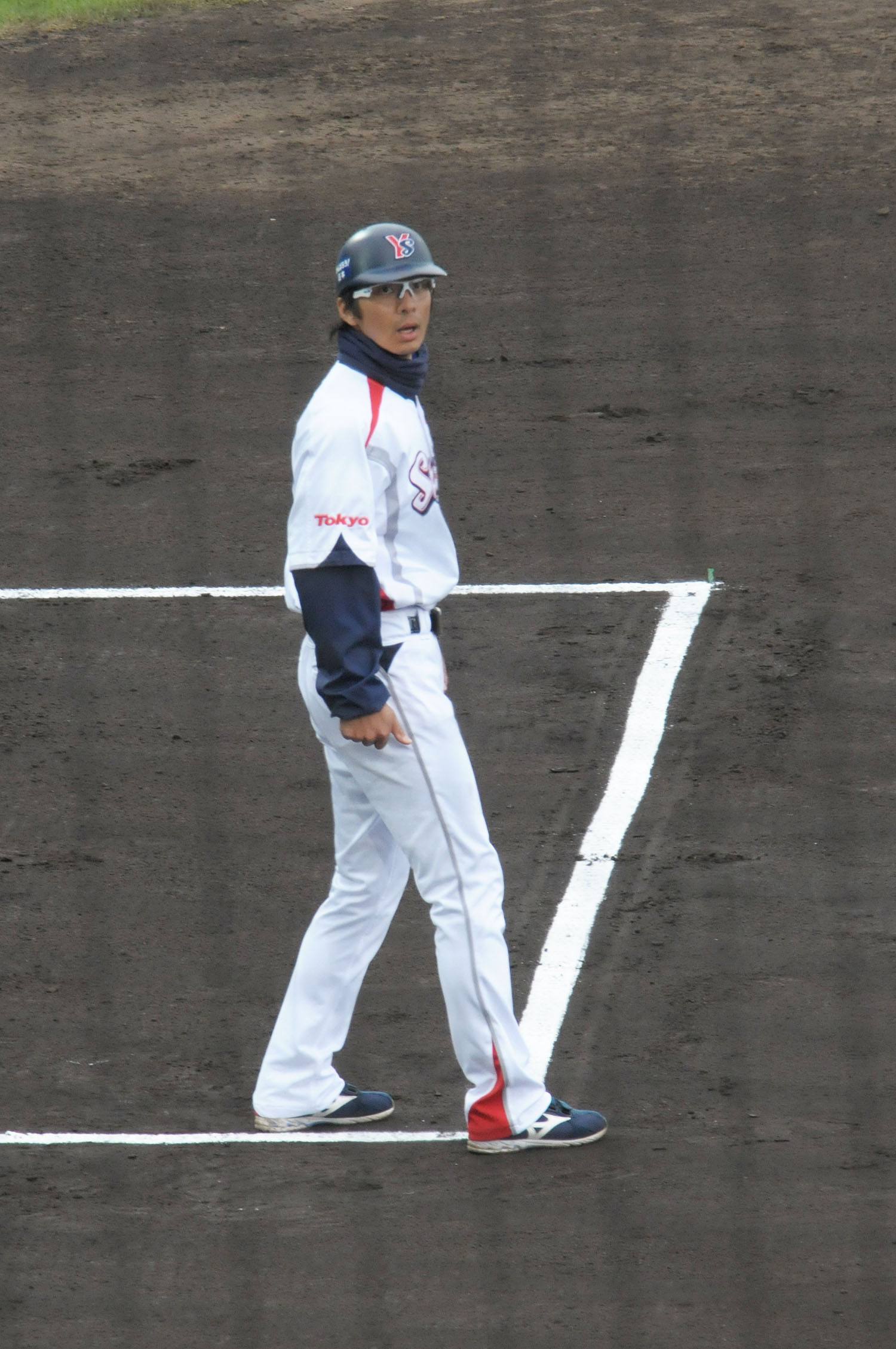

Tokyo Yakult Swallows – No. 79
- Infielder / Coach
- Born: April 17, 1973 (age 52); Ōmiya, Saitama, Japan
- Batted: Right Threw: Right

NPB debut
- October 3, 1995, for the Nippon-Ham Fighters

Last NPB appearance
- October 13, 2009, for the Tokyo Yakult Swallows

NPB statistics (through 2009)
- Batting average: .234
- Home runs: 25
- Hits: 376

Teams
- As player: Nippon-Ham Fighters (1995–1998); Yakult Swallows/Tokyo Yakult Swallows (1998–2009); As coach: Tokyo Yakult Swallows (2010–2014, 2022-present); Hokkaido Nippon-Ham Fighters (2015–2021)

Career highlights and awards
- Japan Series champion (2001)
- Last updated on: 23 January 2022

Noriyuki Shiroishi (城石 憲之, Shiroishi Noriyuki; born April 17, 1973 in Omiya, Saitama, Japan) is a former Nippon Professional Baseball infielder.
