= Futoshi Yamabe =

Japanese baseball player and coach

- Pitcher / Coach
- Born: January 4, 1971; Yawatahama, Ehime, Japan
- Batted: Left Threw: Left

NPB debut
- June 7, 1994, for the Yakult Swallows

Last appearance
- October 15, 2006, for the Tokyo Yakult Swallows

NPB statistics (through 2006)
- Win–loss record: 45–45
- Earned run average: 4.40
- Strikeouts: 651
- Saves: 2

Teams
- As player: Yakult Swallows / Tokyo Yakult Swallows (1994–2006); As coach: Tokyo Yakult Swallows (2007–2010, 2014–2015)

Career highlights and awards
- 2× NPB All-Star (1995, 1996); 3× Japan Series champion (1995, 1997, 2001)
- Last updated on: 9 May 2020

Futoshi Yamabe (山部 太, Yamabe Futoshi; born January 4, 1971) is a Japanese former Nippon Professional Baseball pitcher.
