= Takao Obana =

Japanese baseball player and manager (born 1957)

Takao Obana 尾花 高夫
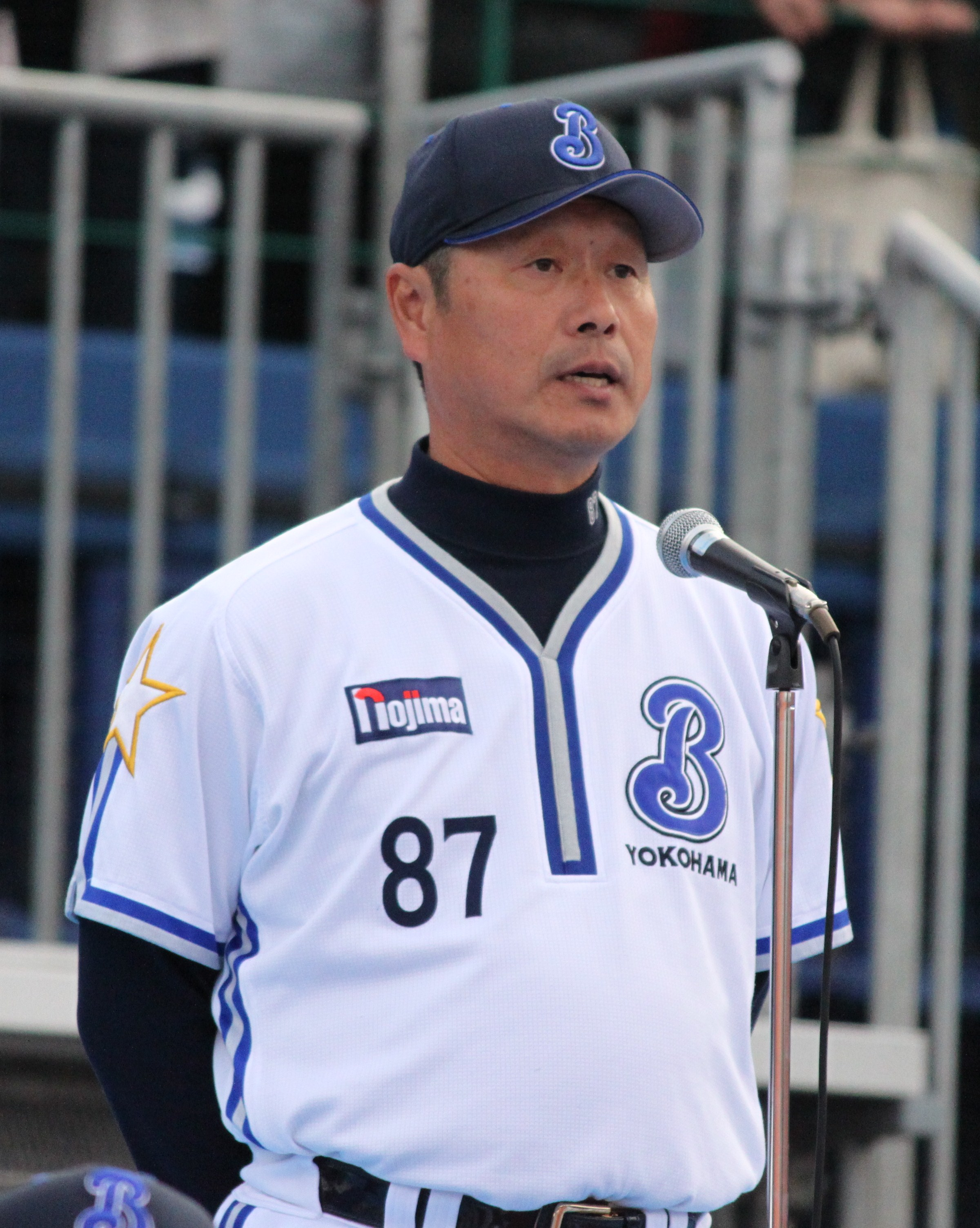
- Pitcher / Manager / Coach
- Born: August 7, 1957 (age 68); Kudoyama, Wakayama
- Batted: Right Threw: Right

NPB debut
- April 22, 1978, for the Yakult Swallows

Last appearance
- October 16, 1991, for the Yakult Swallows

NPB statistics
- Win–loss: 112–135
- ERA: 3.82
- Strikeouts: 1,225

Teams
- As player: Yakult Swallows (1978–1991); As manager: Yokohama BayStars (2010–2011); As coach: Chiba Lotte Marines (1995–1996); Yakult Swallows (1997–1998); Fukuoka Daiei Hawks / Fukuoka SoftBank Hawks (1999–2005); Yomiuri Giants (2006–2009, 2013–2017); Tokyo Yakult Swallows (2021–2023)

Takao Obana (尾花 高夫 Obana Takao, born August 7, 1957, in Kudoyama, Wakayama) is a former Nippon Professional Baseball pitcher and coach. Takao was the Yakult Swallows's fourth pick in the 1978 draft and played the entirety of his 14-year career with the team. He was also the manager of the Yokohama BayStars, the pitching coach for the Swallows, the Chiba Lotte Marines, Fukuoka Daiei Hawks and the Yomiuri Giants.

His daughter Kie is a model.
