= Akihiko Ohya =

Japanese baseball player and manager (born 1947)

Akihiko Ohya 大矢 明彦
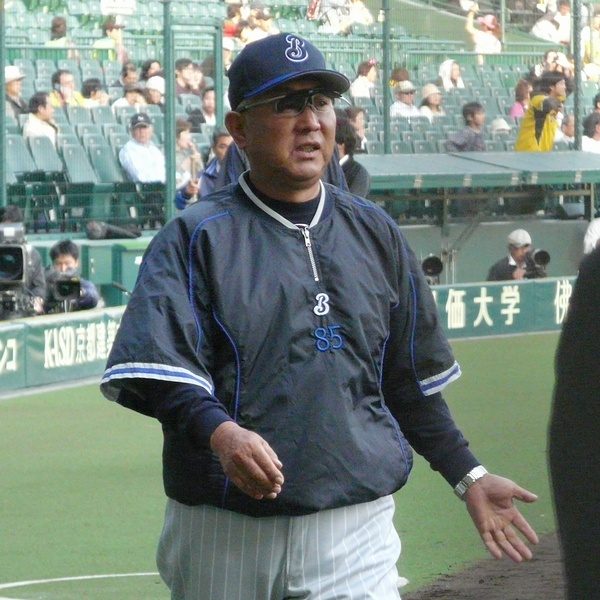
- Catcher / Manager
- Born: December 20, 1947 (age 78); Ota, Tokyo, Japan
- Batted: Right Threw: Right

NPB debut
- April 22, 1970, for the Yakult Atoms

Last appearance
- October 23, 1985, for the Yakult Swallows

NPB statistics
- Batting average: .245
- Hits: 1144
- RBIs: 479
- Stats at Baseball Reference

Teams
- As player: Yakult Atoms /Yakult Swallows (1970–1985); As coach: Yakult Swallows (1984–1985); Yokohama BayStars (1993–1995); As manager: Yokohama BayStars (1996–1997, 2007–2009)

Akihiko Ohya (大矢 明彦 Ōya Akihiko, born December 20, 1947) is a former Japanese baseball player and manager.

As a catcher with the Tokyo Yakult Atoms, Ohya trained in Arizona in 1970. He was a catcher and later coach with the Tokyo Yakult Swallows team in the 1970s and 1980s. He was the manager of the Yokohama BayStars baseball team in Japan's Nippon Professional Baseball league. He was fired on May 18, 2009, for not maintaining club standards.
