= Shingo Takatsu =

Japanese baseball player (born 1968)

Shingo Takatsu 高津 臣吾
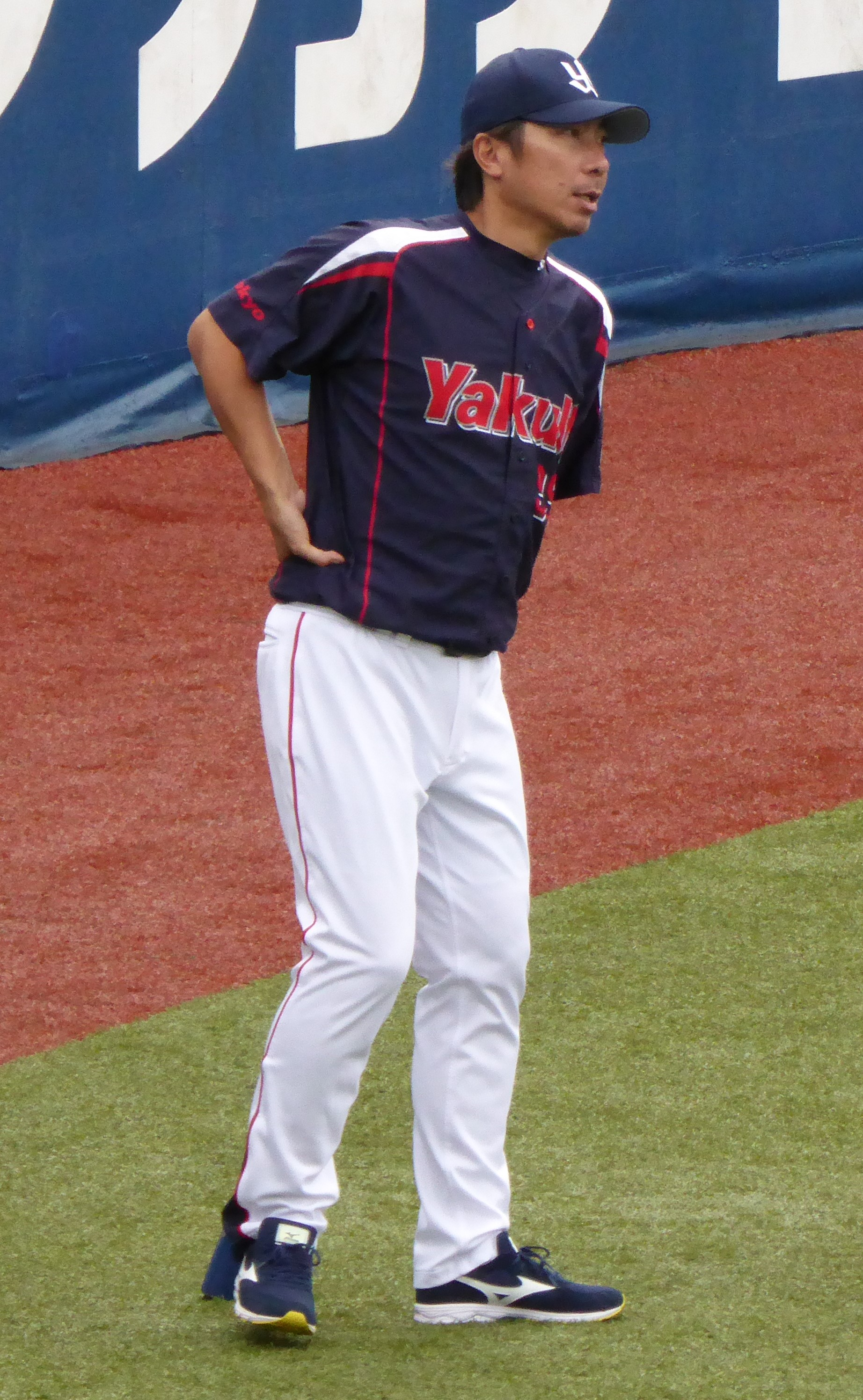
- Relief pitcher / Coach / Manager
- Born: November 25, 1968 (age 57); Hiroshima, Japan
- Batted: Right Threw: Right

Professional debut
- NPB: April 24, 1991, for the Yakult Swallows
- MLB: April 9, 2004, for the Chicago White Sox
- KBO: June 24, 2008, for the Woori Heroes
- CPBL: January, 2010, for the Sinon Bulls

Last appearance
- MLB: October 2, 2005, for the New York Mets
- NPB: October 9, 2007, for the Tokyo Yakult Swallows
- KBO: October 1, 2008, for the Woori Heroes
- CPBL: September 29, 2010, for the Sinon Bulls

NPB statistics
- Win–loss record: 36–46
- Earned run average: 3.20
- Strikeouts: 591
- Saves: 286

MLB statistics
- Win–loss record: 8–6
- Earned run average: 3.38
- Strikeouts: 88
- Saves: 27

KBO statistics
- Win–loss record: 1–0
- Earned run average: 0.86
- Strikeouts: 18

CPBL statistics
- Win–loss record: 1–2
- Earned run average: 1.88
- Strikeouts: 32
- Stats at Baseball Reference

Teams
- As player: Yakult Swallows (1991–2003); Chicago White Sox (2004–2005); New York Mets (2005); Tokyo Yakult Swallows (2006–2007); Woori Heroes (2008); Sinon Bulls (2010); As manager: Tokyo Yakult Swallows (2020–2025); As coach: Tokyo Yakult Swallows (2014–2019)

Career highlights and awards
- As player: 4× Japan Series champion (1993, 1995, 1997, 2001); 6× NPB All-Star selection (1994, 1996, 1999–2000, 2003, 2007); As manager: Japan Series champion (2021); Matsutaro Shoriki Award (2021)

Member of the Japanese

Baseball Hall of Fame
- Induction: 2022
Medals
Men's baseball
Representing Japan
Goodwill Games
Silver medal – second place	1990 Seattle	Team

Shingo Takatsu (高津 臣吾, Takatsu Shingo) (born November 25, 1968) is a Japanese former professional baseball pitcher and manager. He had a short stint with the Chicago White Sox where he was the closer for two seasons until struggles closing games ultimately led to his demotion to the minors. Despite being demoted in the summer of 2005, he received a World Series ring with the White Sox. He was signed by the New York Mets during the 2005 season, and he pitched in nine games for New York. After the 2005 season, he returned to the Nippon Professional Baseball.

He is known by the nickname "Mr. Zero" because he did not give up a single run in 11 Japan Series games. In the 2004 season, his entrance in home games was accompanied by a video montage and a loud gong.

Shingo Takatsu, like many Japanese pitchers, has incorporated pauses into his pitching mechanics in order to throw off batters' timing. His arm angle varies from sidearm to submarine.

== Playing career ==
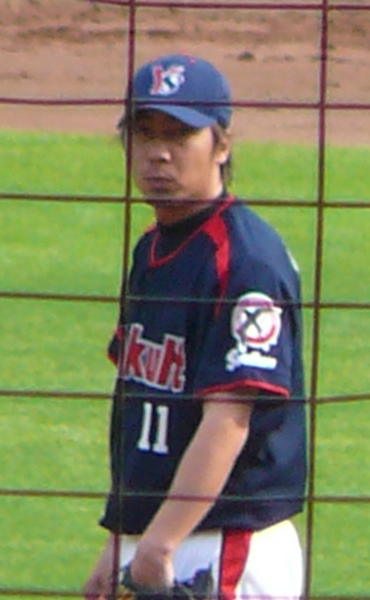
Takatsu pitching for the Tokyo Yakult Swallows in 2006.

Takatsu was a fan of the Hiroshima Toyo Carp during his childhood, and grew up wanting to play for the team. He attended Hiroshima Kogyo High School, and his team advanced to the Koshien tournament twice in his senior year. However, Takatsu was the backup pitcher, and never pitched in the tournament. He continued pitching for Asia University (Japan), but was the backup throughout his college years.

Takatsu was drafted by the Yakult Swallows in the third round of the 1990 draft. He won only 6 games in his first two years as a starter, but became the team's closer in 1993, after marking his first save on May 2. He made 20 saves that year, contributing to his team's championship.

In 1994, Takatsu led the league in saves (19), and saved over 20 games in each of 1995 and 1996. In 1997, he blew several saves at the beginning of the season, and was demoted to relief duty for the rest of 1997 and 1998. He returned to his closing role in 1999, and led the league in saves (30) for the second time in his career. He repeated his performance in 2001, making 37 saves as his team won the championship again. In 2003, he passed Kazuhiro Sasaki in career saves, and led the league in saves for the fourth time in his career.

In 2004, he signed with the Chicago White Sox as a free agent, and marked a 2.31 ERA in 56 games, along with 19 saves. His first major league appearance came against Hideki Matsui, whom he had faced numerous times in the Japanese Central League. Matsui's first home run in Japan had come off Takatsu in the same game in which Takatsu recorded his first career save. Takatsu finished second in AL Rookie of the Year voting behind Bobby Crosby. Takatsu did not pitch well the next season, and was demoted to the minors, and cut in August. He signed a minor league deal with the New York Mets, and made his way up to the majors, but was dropped at the end of the season.

Takatsu returned to his old team, the Yakult Swallows, in 2006. He was a reliever early in the season, but was given the closing job after injuries to Hirotoshi Ishii and Masao Kida. On October 7, 2006, he saved his 300th game (combined number from the majors and Japan). The only other Japanese player to have made 300 saves is former Seattle Mariners closer Kazuhiro Sasaki.

He has saved 8 games in 11 Japanese championship series games (the all-time record), and has not allowed a single run in those 11 games.

In 2008, Takatsu attempted to return to U.S. baseball and signed a minor league deal, with an invitation to spring training, with the Chicago Cubs of the MLB. However, he was released midway through spring training.

Takatsu was signed to the Seoul-based, Woori Heroes on June 13, 2008. He recorded his first save on June 29, 2008, becoming the first pitcher to get saves in Nippon Professional Baseball, Major League Baseball, and Korea Baseball Organization. But he was released from Heroes in December 2008.

On June 15, 2009, he signed a minor league contract with the San Francisco Giants of Major League Baseball.

In January 2010, Takatsu joined Sinon Bulls of CPBL in Taiwan. He becomes the first Japanese professional player to have played in NPB, MLB, KBO, and CPBL. On November 26, 2010, he announced on his blog that Sinon will not renew the contract.

== Coaching career ==
In 2020, Takatsu became the manager of the Tokyo Yakult Swallows, replacing Junji Ogawa.

In 2022, he was inducted into the Japanese Baseball Hall of Fame.

On September 1, 2025, Takatsu announced that he would be stepping down as the Swallows' manager following the season.

== Pitching style ==
Takatsu throws from the sidearm, and relies on three types of sinkers to mix up opponents. His fastball falls in the mid 80 mph range, and his sinkers have different speeds. Two fall in the 66-70 mph range (Takatsu pitches these with a screwball mechanics, and these pitches sometimes are described as a changeup), while the other can reach 80 mph. He occasionally throws a curve as well. When Takatsu first arrived in the major leagues, commentators called his sinkers changeups, since they were so slow compared to conventional sinkers. He is one of the few closers that does not throw a good fastball or a hard breaking pitch, relying on good control to make batters hit themselves into outs.
