= Yusuke Kawada =

Japanese baseball player (born 1967)

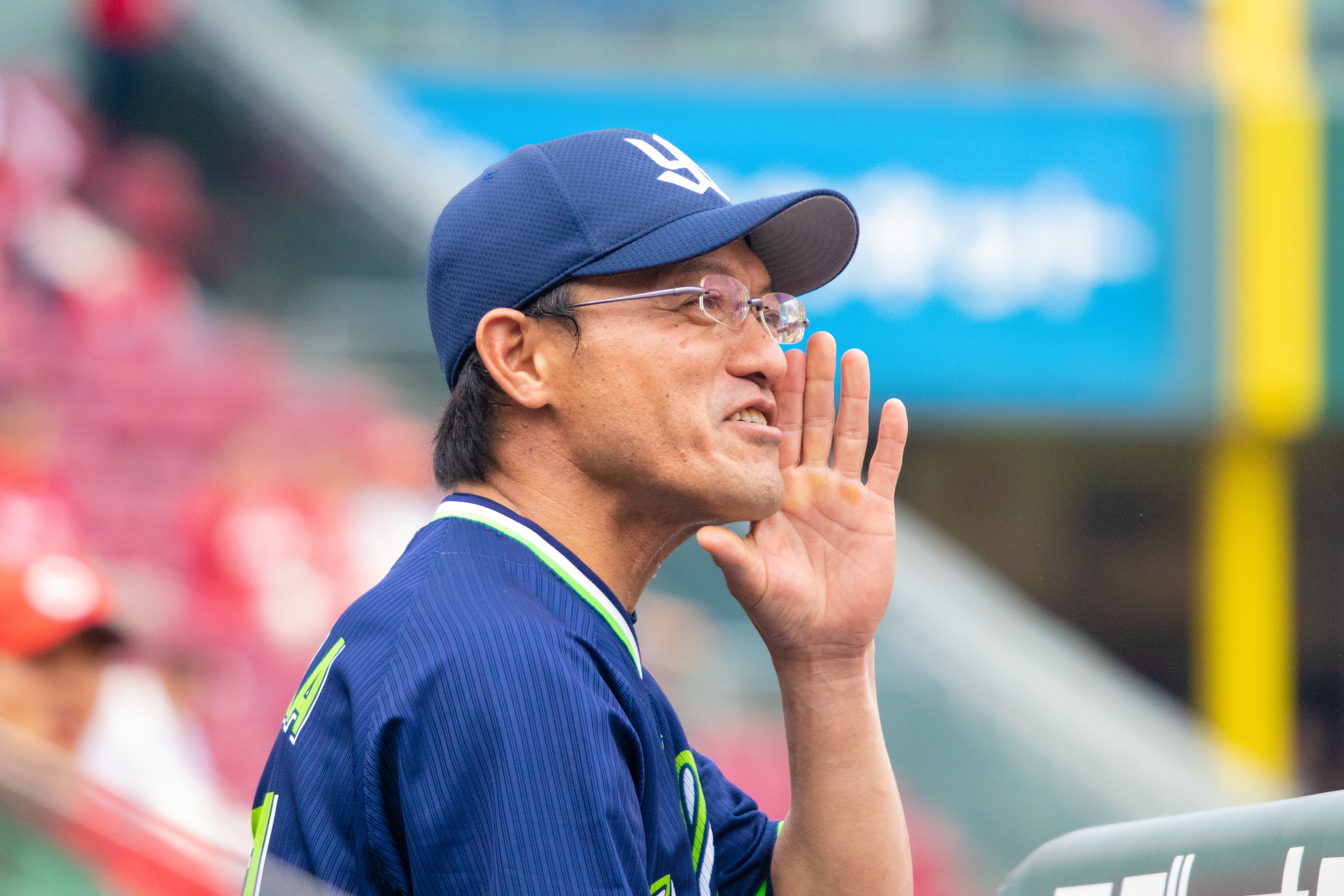

Yokohama DeNA BayStars – No. 74
- Outfielder / Coach
- Born: December 22, 1967 (age 58); Nerima, Tokyo
- Batted: Left Threw: Right

NPB debut
- August 16, 1990, for the Hiroshima Toyo Carp

Last NPB appearance
- July 30, 2002, for the Seibu Lions

NPB statistics (through 2002 season)
- Batting average: .223
- Hits: 137
- RBIs: 50
- Stats at Baseball Reference

Teams
- As player: Hiroshima Toyo Carp (1986–1995); Seibu Lions (1996–2002); As coach: Seibu Lions/Saitama Seibu Lions (2003–2015); Hiroshima Toyo Carp (2016–2017, 2021–2022); Tokyo Yakult Swallows (2018–2020, 2023–2024); Yokohama DeNA BayStars (2025–)
- Last updated on: 4 December 2024

Yusuke Kawada (河田 雄祐, Kawada Yusuke; born December 22, 1967 in Nerima, Tokyo, Japan) is a former Japanese Nippon Professional Baseball player.
