= Hiroshi Kobayashi (baseball) =

Japanese baseball player

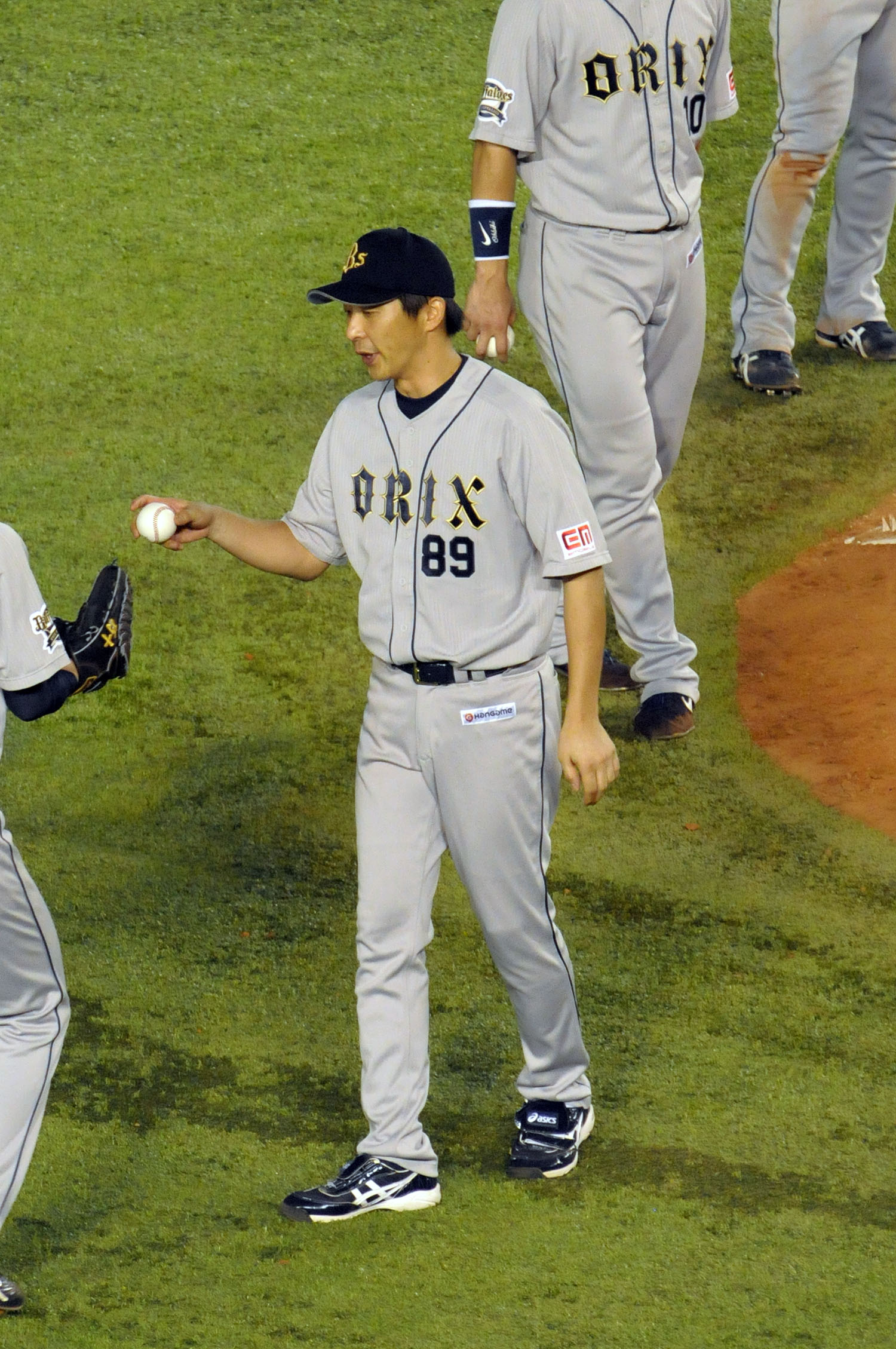
- Kobayashi with the Orix Buffaloes

Orix Buffaloes – No. 89
- Pitcher / Coach
- Born: November 30, 1970 (age 54)
- Batted: Right Threw: Right

NPB debut
- July 29, 1993, for the Orix BlueWave

Last appearance
- August 10, 2005, for the Tohoku Rakuten Golden Eagles

NPB statistics (through 2005)
- Win–loss record: 53-47
- ERA: 4.42
- Strikeouts: 448

Teams
- As player: Orix BlueWave (1993–2004); Tohoku Rakuten Golden Eagles (2005); As coach: Orix Buffaloes (2009–2014, 2016–present)

Career highlights and awards
- 1× NPB All-Star (1997)

Hiroshi Kobayashi (小林 宏, Kobayashi Hiroshi; born November 30, 1970) is a retired Japanese professional pitcher, who currently coaches for Orix Buffaloes.
