= Hiromu Matsuoka =

Japanese baseball player (born 1947)

- Pitcher
- Born: September 26, 1947 (age 78); Kurashiki, Okayama, Japan
- Batted: Right Threw: Right

debut
- 1968, for the Sankei Atoms

Last appearance
- 1985, for the Yakult Swallows

Career statistics
- Win–loss record: 191–190
- Earned run average: 3.33
- Strikeouts: 2,008
- Stats at Baseball Reference

Teams
- As player: Sankei Atoms / Yakult Atoms / Yakult Swallows (1968–1985); As coach: Yakult Swallows (1986 – 1989, 2003 – 2005)

Career highlights and awards
- Eiji Sawamura Award (1978)

Hiromu Matsuoka (松岡 弘, Matsuoka Hiromu; born July 26, 1947) is a Japanese former professional baseball pitcher in Nippon Professional Baseball (NPB). He played for the Sankei Atoms / Yakult Atoms / Yakult Swallows. He won the Eiji Sawamura Award in 1978.
