= Doug Jennings (baseball) =

American baseball player (born 1964)

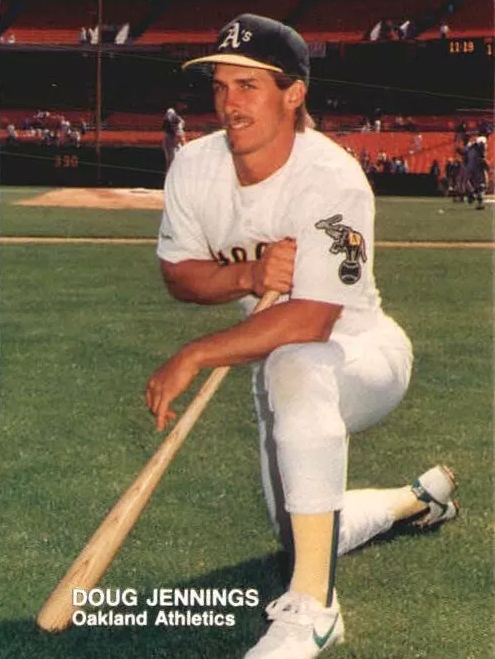
- Jennings with the Oakland Athletics c. 1988
- Outfielder
- Born: September 30, 1964 (age 61); Atlanta, Georgia, U.S.
- Batted: Left Threw: Left

Professional debut
- MLB: April 8, 1988, for the Oakland Athletics
- NPB: April 1, 1995, for the Orix BlueWave

Last appearance
- MLB: September 26, 1993, for the Chicago Cubs
- NPB: April 18, 1997, for the Orix BlueWave

MLB statistics
- Batting average: .202
- Home runs: 5
- Runs batted in: 37

NPB statistics
- Batting average: .246
- Home runs: 32
- Runs batted in: 110
- Stats at Baseball Reference

Teams
- Oakland Athletics (1988–1991); Chicago Cubs (1993); Orix BlueWave (1995–1997)

James Douglas Jennings (born September 30, 1964), or referred to in Japan as "D.J", is an American former professional baseball player who played in the Major Leagues primarily as a utility player from 1988–1991 and 1993, and in Nippon Professional Baseball for the Orix BlueWave as an outfielder from 1995 to 1997.

== Baseball career (1984–2005) ==
=== Early career ===
Jennings was drafted by the Angels in the 2nd round of the 1984 MLB draft. He started his professional career in Salem. In 1985, he was brought up to Quad Cities. In 1986, he was brought up to Palm Springs. In 1987, he was brought up to Midland. After the season, he was selected by the Oakland Athletics in the Rule V Draft on December 7, 1987.

=== Oakland Athletics (1987–1991) ===
Jennings made his Major League debut with the Oakland A's In 1988. His Major League career got off to a quick start in April 1988 for Oakland. The Athletics had taken him from the Angels system the previous off-season. Now, in his first major-league start, Jennings went 4-for-4, hitting a home run and scoring four times.

=== Chicago Cubs (1993) ===
Jennings arrived in Chicago from Des Moines around 5:00 p.m. on June 1, 1993. Four hours later, his pinch-hit double broke a seventh-inning tie and sparked the Cubs to an 8–3 victory over the New York Mets in front of a crowd of more than 30,000 people at Wrigley Field.

=== Orix BlueWave (1995–1997) ===
Jennings played in Japan for 3 years with the Orix BlueWave, teammates with Ichiro all three seasons, D.J batted in the lineup in either the 3 or 4 hole and helped lead Orix to consecutive Japan Series, losing in 1995 and winning in 1996. In game 4 of the 1995 series DJ hit an extra-inning home run which proved to be the game-winner, for the only game they won in the series which they lost 4 games to 1. One of the highlights of his time in Japan was tying a Japanese home run record by hitting home runs in four consecutive at-bats.

=== Atlantic League (1999–2005) ===
In 1999, Jennings played for the Newark Bears. On July 16, 1999, he hit the game-winning home run in the 10th inning in the first game at Bears & Eagles Riverfront Stadium. From 2000 to 2005 Jennings played for the Long Island Ducks also of the independent Atlantic League.
