= Montell Higuma =

Japanese baseball player (born 2000)

Montell Higuma Montell
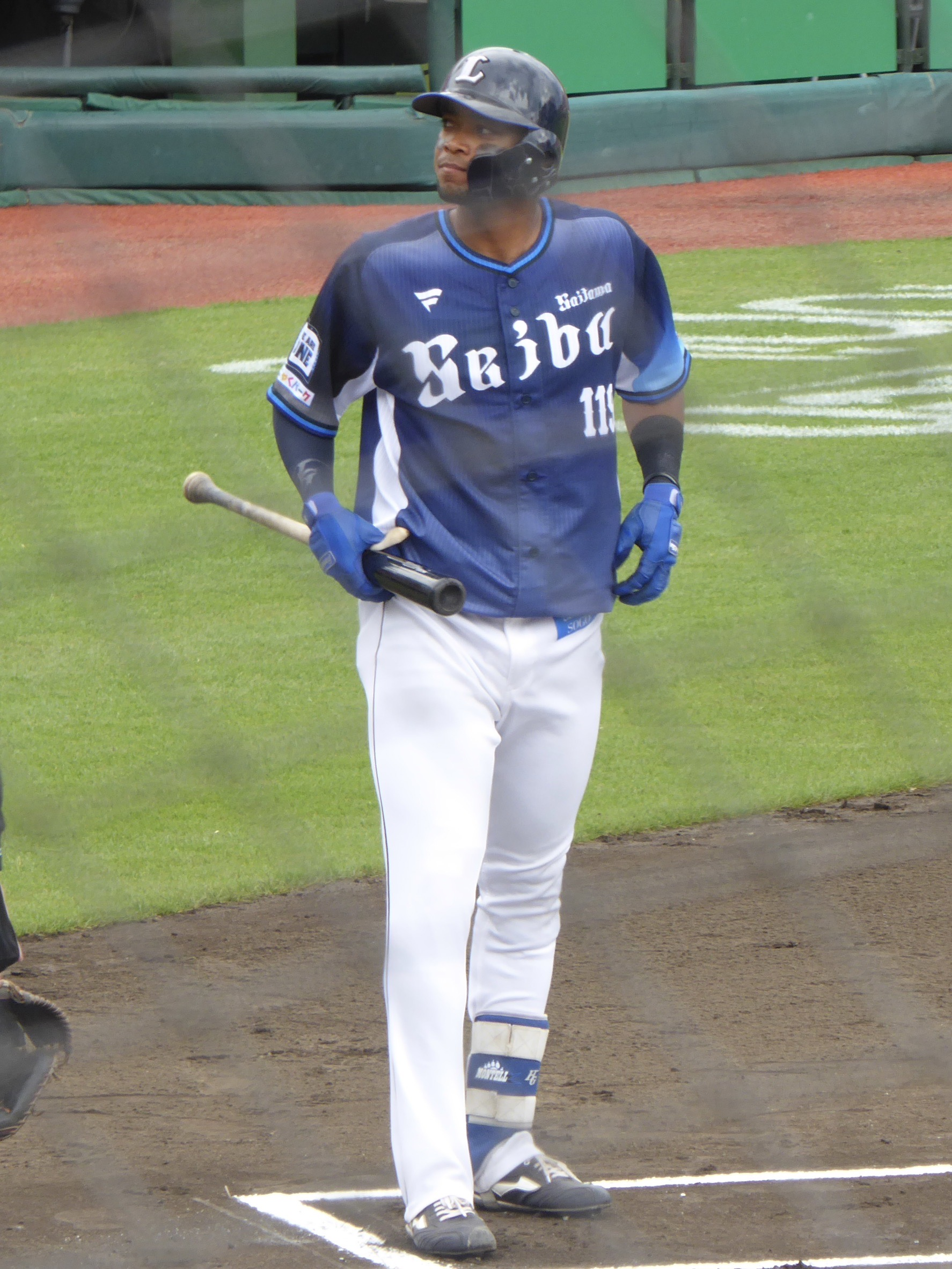

Tokyo Yakult Swallows – No. 90
- Outfielder
- Born: March 18, 2000 (age 26); Chatan, Okinawa, Japan
- Bats: Right Throws: Right

NPB debut
- May 7, 2025, for the Saitama Seibu Lions

Career statistics (through 2025 season)
- Batting average: .091
- Hits: 1
- Home runs: 0
- RBI: 0
- Stats at Baseball Reference

Teams
- Saitama Seibu Lions (2023–2025); Tokyo Yakult Swallows (2026–present)

Montell Higuma (日隈 モンテル, Higuma Montell; born March 18, 2000) also known as Montell is a Japanese professional baseball outfielder for the Tokyo Yakult Swallows of Nippon Professional Baseball (NPB).
