= Terry Bross =

American baseball player (born 1966)

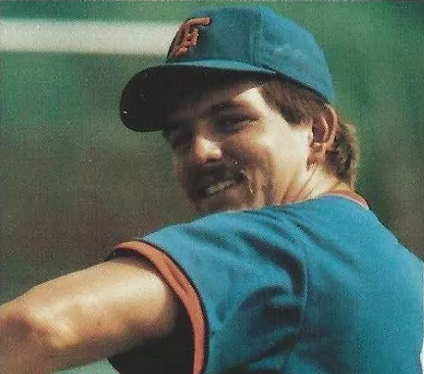
- Bross with the Little Falls Mets c. 1988
- Pitcher
- Born: March 30, 1966 (age 60); El Paso, Texas, U.S.
- Batted: Right Threw: Right

Professional debut
- MLB: September 4, 1991, for the New York Mets
- NPB: April 9, 1995, for the Yakult Swallows

Last appearance
- MLB: September 14, 1993, for the San Francisco Giants
- NPB: October 9, 1998, for the Seibu Lions

MLB statistics
- Win–loss record: 0–0
- Earned run average: 3.00
- Strikeouts: 6

NPB statistics
- Win–loss record: 30–28
- Earned run average: 3.70
- Strikeouts: 353
- Stats at Baseball Reference

Teams
- New York Mets (1991); San Francisco Giants (1993); Yakult Swallows (1995–1997); Seibu Lions (1998–1999)

Terrence Paul "Terry" Bross (born March 30, 1966) is an American former professional baseball pitcher. He played in Major League Baseball (MLB) for the New York Mets and San Francisco Giants, and in Nippon Professional Baseball (NPB) for the Yakult Swallows and Seibu Lions. He bats and throws right-handed.

== Career ==
Bross attended St. John's University. A two-sport star, Bross also started at center for the school's basketball team. He helped St. John's to a Big East championship and a Final Four appearance. On the baseball field, Bross anchored the team's pitching staff and helped lead his team to another Big East championship on the diamond.

Bross was drafted by the New York Mets in the 13th round of the 1987 amateur draft. He was signed June 10, 1987. He moved quickly through the Mets system, setting a saves record with the Double–A Jackson Mets. Bross ultimately pitched out of the Mets bullpen in 1991 as well as for the San Francisco Giants in 1993. His final career numbers include a 0–0 record in 10 games and a 3.00 career ERA.

Bross would later go on to play in Nippon Professional Baseball for the Yakult Swallows and the Seibu Lions from 1995 to 1999. Bross led the Central League in earned run average in 1995, with a 2.33 ERA. He threw a no-hitter for the Swallows in September 1995.
