= Masafumi Hirai =

Japanese baseball player (born 1975)

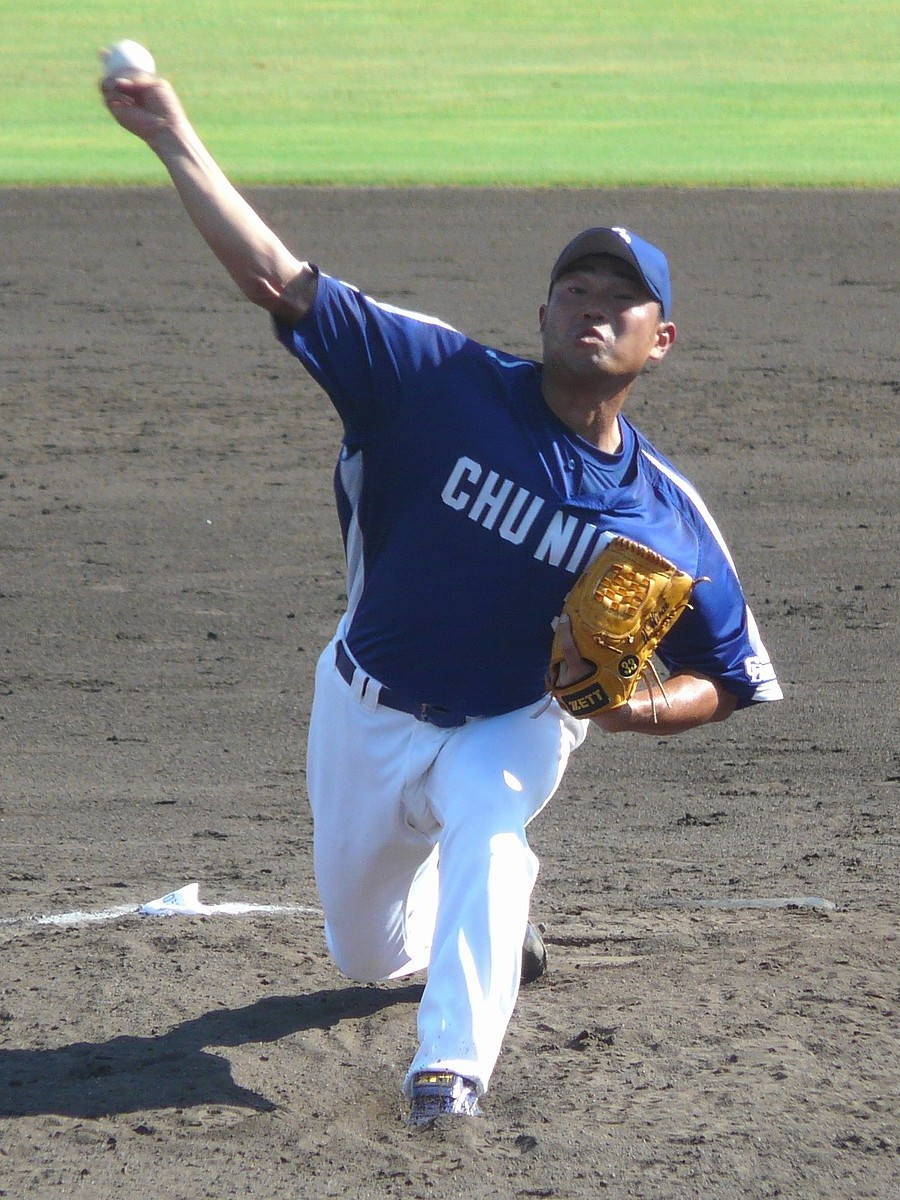

Orix Buffaloes – No. 72
- Pitcher / Coach
- Born: April 21, 1975 (age 51); Uwajima, Ehime Prefecture, Japan
- Batted: Right Threw: Right

NPB debut
- September 10, 1994, for the Orix BlueWave

Last NPB appearance
- June 8, 2014, for the Orix Buffaloes

NPB statistics
- Win–loss record: 63-43
- Earned run average: 3.31
- Strikeouts: 620
- Stats at Baseball Reference

Teams
- As player: Orix BlueWave (1994–2002); Chunichi Dragons (2003–2012); Orix Buffaloes (2013–2014); As coach: Orix Buffaloes (2015–present)

Career highlights and awards
- NPB All-Star (1995); Pacific League Rookie of the Year (1995); Comeback Player of the Year (2003)

Masafumi Hirai (平井 正史, born April 21, 1975) is a Japanese former professional baseball pitcher. Hirai played in Nippon Professional Baseball (NPB) for the Orix BlueWave/Buffaloes from 1994 to 2002 and from 2013 to 2014, and the Chunichi Dragons from 2003 to 2012.
