= 2001 Japan Series =

Team (Wins)	Managers	Season
Yakult Swallows (4)	Tsutomu Wakamatsu	76–58–6 (.567), 3 GA
Osaka Kintetsu Buffaloes (1)	Masataka Nashida	78–60–2 (.565), 2½ GA
- Dates: October 20–25
- MVP: Atsuya Furuta (Yakult)
- FSA: Tuffy Rhodes (Osaka)

Broadcast
- Television: ABC (Games 1, 2), Fuji Television (Games 3, 5), TV Asahi (Game 4)

The 2001 Japan Series was the championship series of Nippon Professional Baseball (NPB) for the 2001 season. The 52nd edition of the series, it was a best-of-seven playoff that matched the Central League champion Yakult Swallows against the Pacific League champion Osaka Kintetsu Buffaloes. The Swallows defeated the Buffaloes in five games to claim their fifth Japan Series championship.

== Background ==
=== Osaka Kintetsu Buffaloes ===
Kintetsu had one of the most powerful offenses ever seen in the league. Foreign import Tuffy Rhodes teamed up with Norihiro Nakamura to become one of the most feared hitting tandems in Nippon Professional Baseball history. Rhodes hit 55 home runs to tie the NPB record for most home runs hit in a season, while Nakamura hit 46 home runs of his own. Kintetsu entered the series looking for the franchise's first ever Japan Series win. They lost in 1979 and 1980 to the Hiroshima Toyo Carp and in 1989 against the Yomiuri Giants.

=== Yakult Swallows ===
Most of the core team from the 1997 Japan Series championship still remained in Kazuhisa Ishii and all-world catcher Atsuya Furuta. Shinya Miyamoto anchored the middle of the infield.

== Summary ==
CL Yakult Swallows (4) vs. PL Osaka Kintetsu Buffaloes (1)

Game	Date	Score	Location	Time	Attendance
1	October 20	Yakult Swallows – 7, Osaka Kintetsu Buffaloes – 0	Osaka Dome	3:35	33,837
2	October 21	Yakult Swallows – 6, Osaka Kintetsu Buffaloes – 9	Osaka Dome	4:07	33,277
3	October 23	Osaka Kintetsu Buffaloes – 2, Yakult Swallows – 9	Jingu Stadium	3:17	30,443
4	October 24	Osaka Kintetsu Buffaloes – 1, Yakult Swallows – 2	Jingu Stadium	2:55	32,145
5	October 25	Osaka Kintetsu Buffaloes – 2, Yakult Swallows – 4	Jingu Stadium	3:46	32,568

== Matchups ==
=== Game 1 ===
Saturday, October 20, 2001, 6:10 pm (JST) at Osaka Dome in Osaka, Osaka Prefecture
Team	1	2	3	4	5	6	7	8	9	R	H	E
Yakult	0	1	0	0	0	3	0	1	2	7	10	0
Osaka	0	0	0	0	0	0	0	0	0	0	1	1
WP: Kazuhisa Ishii (1–0) LP: Jeremy Powell (0–1); Home runs: YAK: Alex Ramírez (1), Atsuya Furuta (1); OSK: None

Game 1 matched Kazuhisa Ishii versus Jeremy Powell in the first Japan Series game held at the Osaka Dome. Ishii kept the Buffaloes lineup at bay for Yakult with a dominant performance that saw him allow no hits until there was one out in the seventh inning. For eight innings of 143 pitches, Ishii struck out 12 batters and walked five batters while the Swallows had two home runs that saw Alex Ramirez hit a three-run home run in the sixth inning to break the game open as the Swallows prevailed in Game 1.

=== Game 2 ===
Sunday, October 21, 2001, 6:11 pm (JST) at Osaka Dome in Osaka, Osaka Prefecture
Team	1	2	3	4	5	6	7	8	9	R	H	E
Yakult	0	1	2	1	1	1	0	0	0	6	10	0
Osaka	0	0	0	1	1	4	0	3	X	9	10	0
WP: Akira Okamoto (1–0) LP: Ryota Igarashi (0–1) Sv: Akinori Otsuka (1); Home runs: YAK: Mitsuru Manaka (1); OSK: Norihiro Nakamura (1), Eiji Mizuguchi (1), Tuffy Rhodes (1)

Osaka's Hisashi Iwakuma was matched against Yakult's Shugo Fujii. A pivotal three-run home run by Eiji Mizuguchi led the way of a four-run sixth inning that saw the Buffaloes overcome a 6–2 deficit with seven unanswered runs to even the series.

=== Game 3 ===
Tuesday, October 23, 2001, 6:30 pm (JST) at Jingu Stadium in Shinjuku, Tokyo
Team	1	2	3	4	5	6	7	8	9	R	H	E
Osaka	0	0	0	0	1	0	1	0	0	2	4	0
Yakult	2	0	0	0	4	3	0	0	X	9	10	1
WP: Satoshi Iriki (1–0) LP: Sean Bergman (0–1); Home runs: OSA: Mitsuru Manaka (2); YAK: None

=== Game 4 ===
Wednesday, October 24, 2001, 6:30 pm (JST) at Jingu Stadium in Shinjuku, Tokyo
Team	1	2	3	4	5	6	7	8	9	R	H	E
Osaka	0	0	0	1	0	0	0	0	0	1	2	0
Yakult	0	0	0	0	1	0	1	0	X	2	8	0
WP: Alan Newman (1–0) LP: Akira Okamoto (1–1) Sv: Shingo Takatsu (1); Home runs: OSA: Kota Soejima (1); YAK: Tuffy Rhodes (2)

=== Game 5 ===
Thursday, October 25, 2001, 6:30 pm (JST) at Jingu Stadium in Shinjuku, Tokyo
Team	1	2	3	4	5	6	7	8	9	R	H	E
Osaka	0	0	0	0	2	0	0	0	0	2	9	2
Yakult	3	0	0	1	0	0	0	0	0	4	12	0
WP: Tatsuki Yamamoto (1–0) LP: Jeremy Powell (0–2) Sv: Shingo Takatsu (2)

Akinori Iwamura delivered a two-run base hit in the first inning in a game where the Swallows for nearly the entire game on their way for their fourth championship in eight years. Atsuya Furuta, who batted .500 in the series with seven hits and 3 RBIs, was named Japan Series MVP. With his previous win of the award in 1997, he became the fifth (and so far last) player to win the Japan Series MVP multiple times.

== See also ==
- 2001 World Series
