= Eiji Mizuguchi =

Japanese baseball player and coach (born 1969)

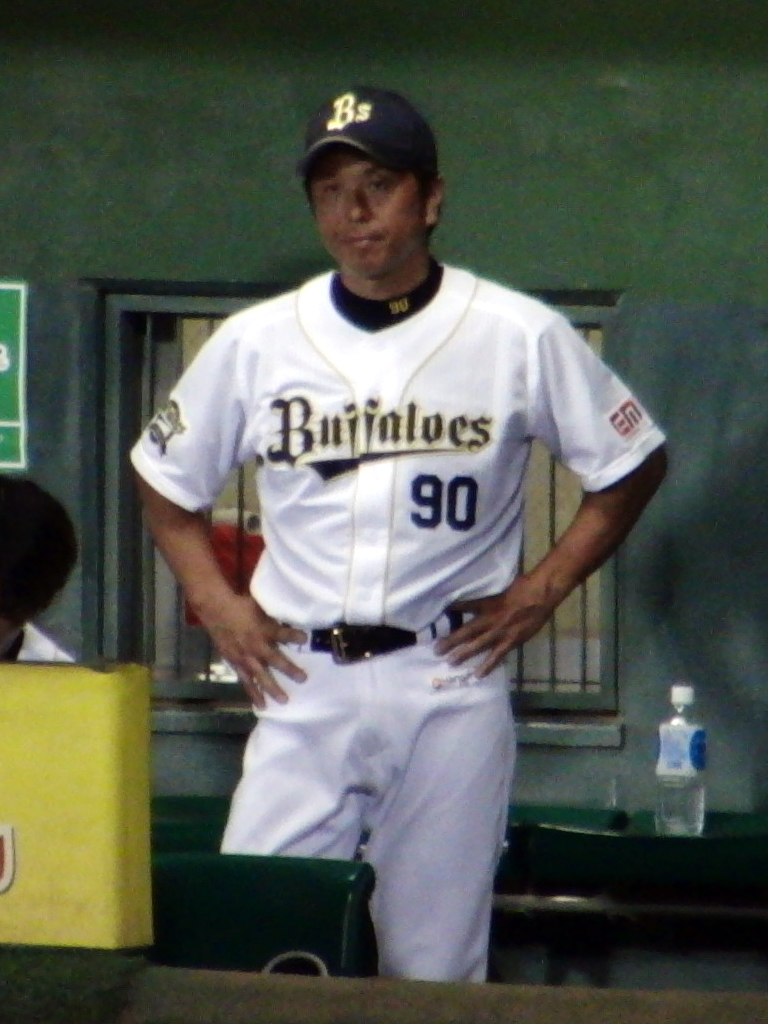
- Infielder / Coach
- Born: January 9, 1969; Yawatahama, Ehime, Japan
- Batted: Right Threw: Right

NPB debut
- May 11, 1991, for the Kintetsu Buffaloes

Last appearance
- October 2, 2007, for the Orix Buffaloes

NPB statistics (through 2007)
- Batting average: .269
- Hits: 1,213
- Home runs: 53
- Runs batted in: 417
- Stolen base: 43
- Stats at Baseball Reference

Teams
- As player: Kintetsu Buffaloes/Osaka Kintetsu Buffaloes (1991–2004); Orix Buffaloes (2005–2007); As coach: Orix Buffaloes (2008–2012); Hanshin Tigers (2023–2024)

Career highlights and awards
- 1× NPB All-Star (1996)

Eiji Mizuguchi (水口 栄二, Mizuguchi Eiji; born January 9, 1969) is a Japanese former Nippon Professional Baseball infielder.
