= Hirotoshi Ishii =

Japanese baseball player (born 1977)

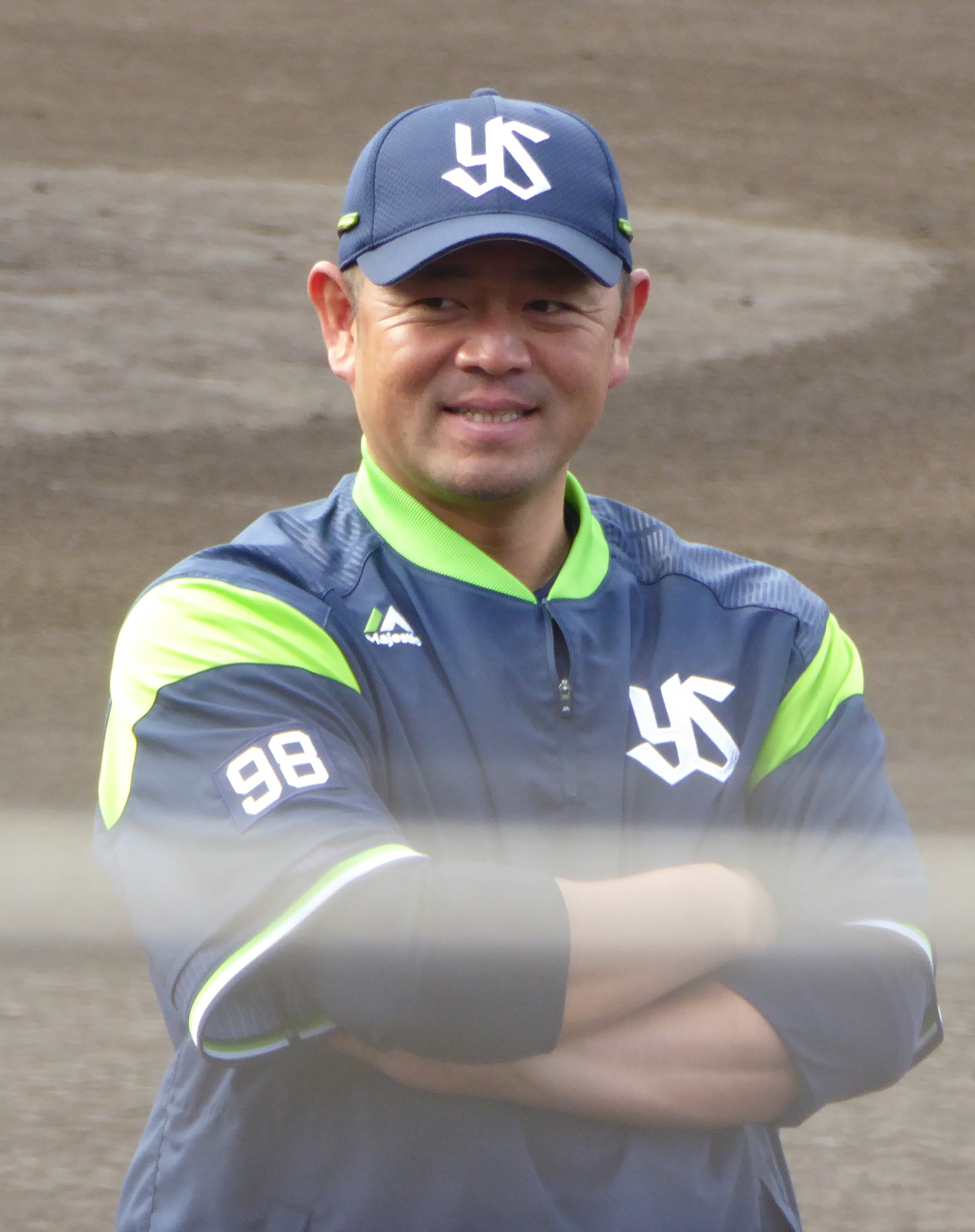

Hiroshima Toyo Carp – No. 82
- Pitcher / Pitching coach
- Born: September 14, 1977 (age 48); Ichihara, Chiba
- Batted: Left Threw: Left

NPB debut
- July 6, 1996, for the Yakult Swallows

Last NPB appearance
- October 25, 2011, for the Tokyo Yakult Swallows

NPB statistics
- Win–loss record: 27–15
- Earned run average: 2.66
- Strikeouts: 485

Teams
- As player: Yakult Swallows/Tokyo Yakult Swallows (1996–2011); As coach: Tokyo Yakult Swallows (2012–2025); Hiroshima Toyo Carp (2026-present)

Career highlights and awards
- Central League Most Valuable Setup Pitcher (2002)
Medals
Representing Japan
Men's baseball
| Bronze medal – third place | Athens 2004 | Team competition |
World Baseball Classic
| Gold medal – first place | 2006 San Diego | Team |

Hirotoshi Ishii (石井 弘寿, born September 14, 1977) is a Japanese baseball coach and former relief pitcher for the Tokyo Yakult Swallows.

He has repeatedly expressed a desire to play in the majors, and several teams have shown an interest in the left-hander. The Swallows were reluctant to release Ishii in the 2005 off-season, but promised they would allow him to come to the majors if he was able to play another full season in Japan (a similar promise was made to Akinori Iwamura, who signed with the Tampa Bay Devil Rays). Ishii was expected to sign with a major league team during the 2006 off-season, but injured his left shoulder, and decided to remain with the Swallows.

He joined the Japanese national baseball team for the 2004 Summer Olympics, and won a bronze medal.
