= Tsutomu Wakamatsu =

Japanese baseball player, coach, and manager

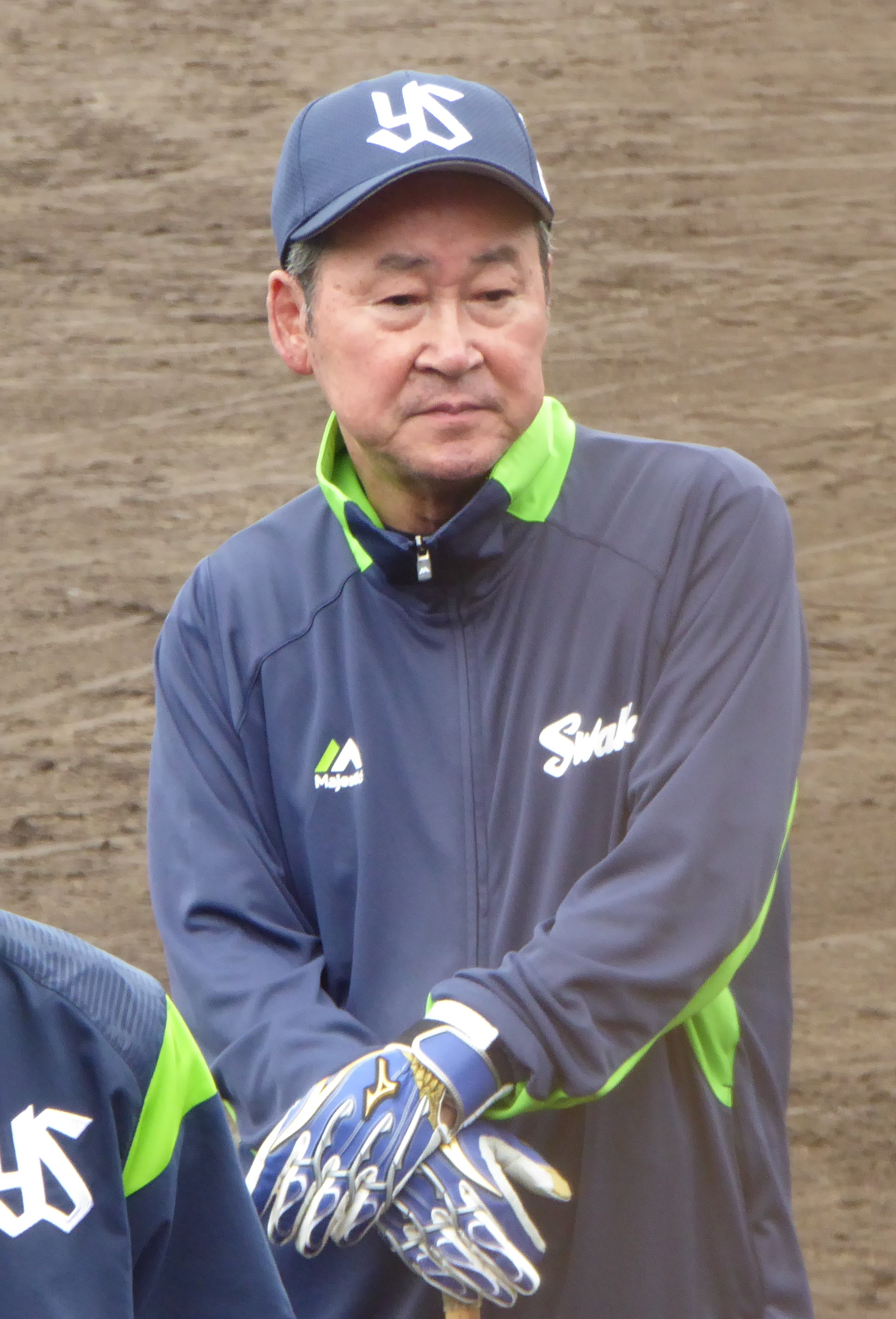
- Outfielder / Manager
- Born: April 17, 1947 (age 79); Rumoi, Hokkaidō, Japan
- Batted: Left Threw: Right

NPB debut
- 1971, for the Yakult Atoms

Last appearance
- 1989, for the Yakult Swallows

Career statistics
- Batting average: .319
- Home runs: 220
- Hits: 2,173
- Runs batted in: 884
- Stats at Baseball Reference

Teams
- As player: Yakult Atoms/Yakult Swallows (1971–1989); As coach: Yakult Swallows (1993–1998); As manager: Yakult Swallows (1999–2005)

Career highlights and awards
- Central League MVP 1978; 2x Batting Title (1972,1977); 9x Best Nine Award (1972–1974, 1976–1980, 1984); 2x Golden Glove Award (1977, 1978); Championship Series MVP (1978); 11x times All-Star selection(1972–1980, 1983, 1984); 2x All-Star games MVP (1973, 1977); Tokyo Yakult Swallows #1 retired; NPB record: Japanese record .319 Batting average

Member of the Japanese

Baseball Hall of Fame
- Induction: 2009

Tsutomu Wakamatsu (若松 勉, Wakamatsu Tsutomu; born April 17, 1947) is a Japanese former baseball player, coach, and manager for the Yakult Swallows in Nippon Professional Baseball. He batted left-handed, and threw right-handed. His number 1 is honoured by the Swallows.

== Awards and accomplishments ==
- MVP (1978)
- 2x Batting Title (1972,1977)
- 9x Best Nine Award (1972–1974, 1976–1980, 1984)
- Golden Glove Award (1977, 1978)
- Championship Series MVP (1978)
- 11x times All-Star selection(1972–1980, 1983, 1984)
- 2x All-Star games MVP (1973, 1977)

== See also ==
- List of Nippon Professional Baseball career hits leaders
