= Tokyo Yakult Swallows =

Professional baseball team in Nippon Professional Baseball's Central League

- 東京ヤクルトスワローズ

Logo	Cap insignia

Information
- League: Nippon Professional Baseball Central League (1950–present)
- Location: Shinjuku, Tokyo, Japan
- Ballpark: Meiji Jingu Stadium
- Founded: January 12, 1950; 76 years ago
- Nickname(s): Tsubame (つばめ, 'swallows')
- Japan Series championships: 6 (1978, 1993, 1995, 1997, 2001, 2021)
- CL pennants: 9 (1978, 1992, 1993, 1995, 1997, 2001, 2015, 2021, 2022)
- Playoff berths: 7 (2009, 2011, 2012, 2015, 2018, 2021, 2022)
- Former name: Yakult Swallows (1974–2005); Yakult Atoms (1970–1973); Atoms (1969); Sankei Atoms (1966–1968); Sankei Swallows (1965); Kokutetsu Swallows (1950–1965)
- Former ballpark: Korakuen Stadium (1950–1963)
- Colors: Navy, Red, Green
- Mascot: Tsubakuro, Tsubami, and Torkuya
- Ownership: Takashige Negishi
- Management: Yakult Honsha
- Manager: Takahiro Ikeyama
- Website: https://www.yakult-swallows.co.jp/

Current uniforms

The Tokyo Yakult Swallows (Japanese: 東京ヤクルトスワローズ, Hepburn: Tōkyō Yakuruto Suwarōzu) are a Japanese professional baseball team competing in Nippon Professional Baseball's Central League. Based in Shinjuku, Tokyo, they are one of two professional baseball teams in Tokyo, the other being the Yomiuri Giants. They have won nine Central League championships and six Japan Series championships. Since 1964, they have played their home games at Meiji Jingu Stadium.

The Swallows are named after their corporate owners, Yakult Honsha. From 1950 to 1965, the team was owned by the former Japanese National Railways (known as Kokutetsu (国鉄) in Japanese) and called the Kokutetsu Swallows; the team was then owned by the newspaper Sankei Shimbun from 1965 to 1968 and called the Sankei Atoms. Yakult purchased the team in 1970 and renamed it the Yakult Atoms, before renaming it again as the Yakult Swallows in 1974, and then the Tokyo Yakult Swallows in 2006.

Through 2026, the franchise's all-time record is 4,670–5,349–352 (.466). The team's current manager is Takahiro Ikeyama.

== History ==
=== Kokutetsu and Sankei era (1950–1969) ===
The franchise was established for the first time in 1950 when the team was created by the owners of what was then Japanese National Railways (now the privatized Japan Railways Group). The team name was made the Kokutetsu Swallows. The team never finished with a winning record in their entire first decade of the 1950s. In 1961, the team ended up being third in the league for the first time in team history. Kokutetsu chose "Swallows" as JNR had an express railway, which at the time, was the fastest in Japan, which was named Tsubame (or 'swallow' in English). Other name ideas were railway themed, such as "Service" or "Whistles". Express was also considered, but was put out, due to fears within JNR of the team's name in headlines like "Express crashing" when the team was in a slump, or "Express explodes" when the team began winning a lot. (This similar issue would be the reason why Randy Bass would have his name lengthened in Japanese as Bāsu (バース; Japanese pronunciation: [baːsɯ]), due to Hanshin owning a bus line at the time, and bus in Japanese is known as basu (バス), which would similarly have a negative impact on Hanshin's bus line.)

Pitcher Masaichi Kaneda, nicknamed "The Emperor", starred for the team during this era and was the league's most dominant pitcher. Kaneda holds numerous career records in the Japanese leagues. For the Swallows, he went 14 straight seasons with at least 20 wins, led the league in strikeouts 10 times, wins three times, ERA three times, and won the Eiji Sawamura Award three times. Kaneda pitched for the Swallows from 1950 to 1964.

In 1965, the team was bought by Sankei Shimbun and Sankei retained the Swallows name for 1 year before switching their name to the Atoms, as they were one of the leading advocates of nuclear energy and because of Astro Boy, which is known as Mighty Atom in Japan, also because of Fuji TV, whom Sankei had a minority stake in, was where Mighty Atom was airing at the time, hence the name of the team. Astro Boy would then be part of the team's logo. Sankei, however, underestimated how costly running a baseball team was, and their ownership would only last 3 seasons.

=== Yakult era (1970–2005) ===
In 1970, Sankei Shimbun offloaded the team to Yakult Honsha, and Yakult kept the Atoms name for three seasons before changing the name, as by 1973, Mushi Production, the creators of Astro Boy, went bankrupt, as well as Osamu Tezuka wanting more money in a new proposed licensing deal, because of fans putting Astro Boy on unofficial merchandise. At the time, the existing deal only allowed Yakult (and to an extent, Sankei), to put Astro Boy on official team merchandise.

Originally, Yakult ran a poll to determine the new name, and announced the winning name, Jaguars, at the 1973 All Star break, and the name was supposed to take effect in the 1974 season. However, amidst fan pressure, Yakult dropped the idea, and reverted to the Swallows name. Sankei kept a minority stake in the team, negotiating a deal that broadcasts all Swallows home games on Fuji TV ONE.

The team won its first Japan Series championship in 1978.

In 1990, Katsuya Nomura became the new manager of the Swallows, making drastic changes to the team. Although his first year with the Swallows resulted in them finishing in fifth place, the Swallows improved to third in the league the next year for the first time since 1980. From 1992 to 2001, the team won five Central League championships, prevailing in the Japan Series in 1993, 1995, 1997, and 2001. Nomura managed the team to the first three of those championships.

=== Tokyo Yakult era (2006–present) ===
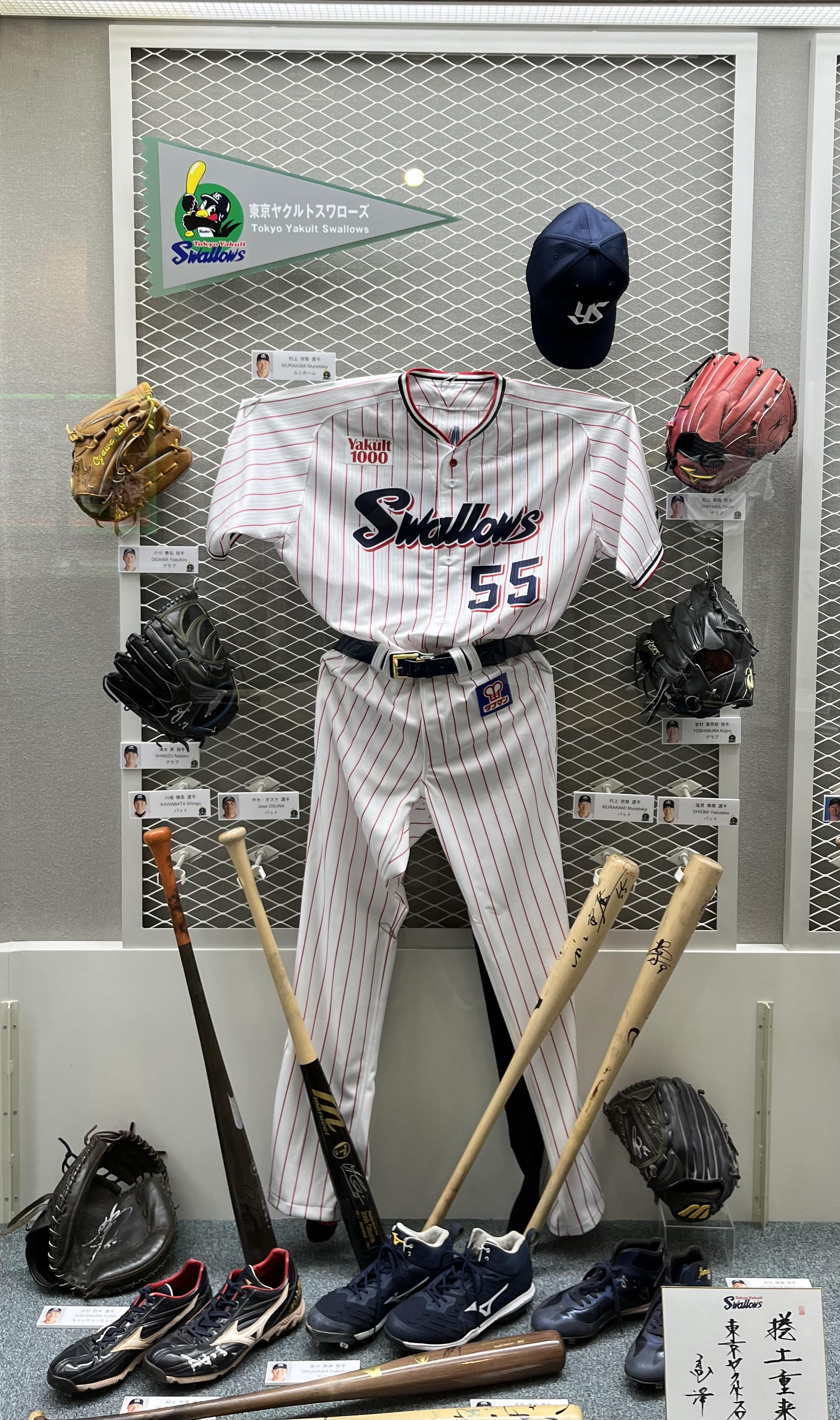
Tokyo Yakult Swallows team display at the Japanese Baseball Hall of Fame, featuring the Swallows' current home uniform and players' equipment

In 2006, "Tokyo" was added to the team name, resulting in the team name of Tokyo Yakult Swallows, and the logo of Tokyo was added to the uniform for the first time since the Kokutetsu era. The team maintained a winning percentage of .500, and ended up in third place in the league.

The Swallows entered the Climax Series in 2009, and faced the Yomiuri Giants in stage 1, which ultimately resulted in a 2–1 victory. The Swallows advanced for the first time into stage 2 and faced the defending Central League champions, the Chunichi Dragons. The Swallows eventually lost against the Dragons by a score of 2–4, ending their postseason. At the end of the season, Hirotoshi Ishii retired from the team.

2011 was an impressive year for the Swallows. In April, the Swallows topped the Central League and kept 1st place until September when the Chunichi Dragons climbed to win in the pennant race, ultimately leaving the Swallows in 2nd place in the Central League.

In 2012, Nori Aoki was posted to the Milwaukee Brewers. On 19 March 2012, the main office was moved to Kita-Aoyama which is located close to the Meiji Jingu Stadium from Higashi-Shinbashi.

In 2013, Swallows outfielder Wladimir Balentien broke the NPB single-season home run record, finishing the season with 60 home runs. This was majorly due to the league secretly introducing a more juiced ball that allowed more home runs to be scored, which caused three-term NPB commissioner Ryozo Kato to resign when the juiced ball was found out about.

The Swallows finished the 2015 regular season with the Central League's best record and defeated the Yomiuri Giants in the Climax Series to advance to the Japan Series, where they lost to the Fukuoka SoftBank Hawks in five games.

The Swallows clinched the 2021 Central League pennant on 26 October 2021 with a 5–1 victory over the Yokohama DeNA BayStars, coupled with the Hanshin Tigers losing 4–0 to the Chunichi Dragons on the same night. The victory clinched the pennant with two games to spare in the regular season. This allowed them to advance to the final stage of the Climax Series, sweeping the Yomiuri Giants, 3–0, to advance to the Japan Series. They eventually won the series against the Orix Buffaloes in six games to win the Japan Series, their first since 2001. They backed it up in 2022 with an 80–59–4 record, winning the 2022 Central League pennant and returning to the Japan Series by sweeping the Hanshin Tigers in the 2022 Central League Climax Series, once again facing the Orix Buffaloes. This time however, the Buffaloes would exact revenge on the Swallows, beating them in the Japan Series in seven games, 4–2–1. Third baseman Munetaka Murakami broke the Japanese-born single season home run record in 2022 with 56 home runs, surpassing Sadaharu Oh's record of 55 set in 1964.

== Gallery ==
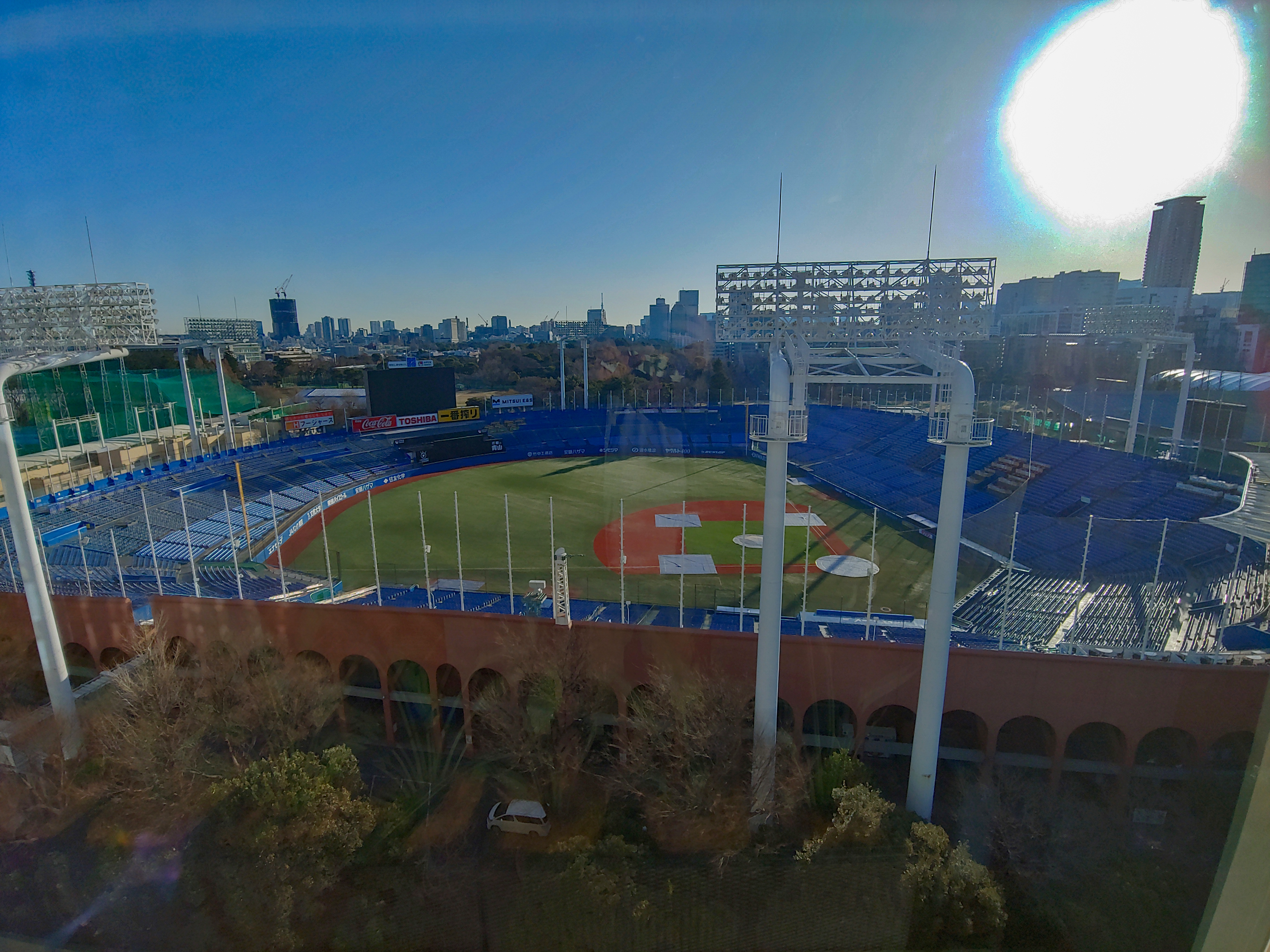
View of Meiji Jingu Baseball Stadium, the Tokyo Yakult Swallows' home ballpark

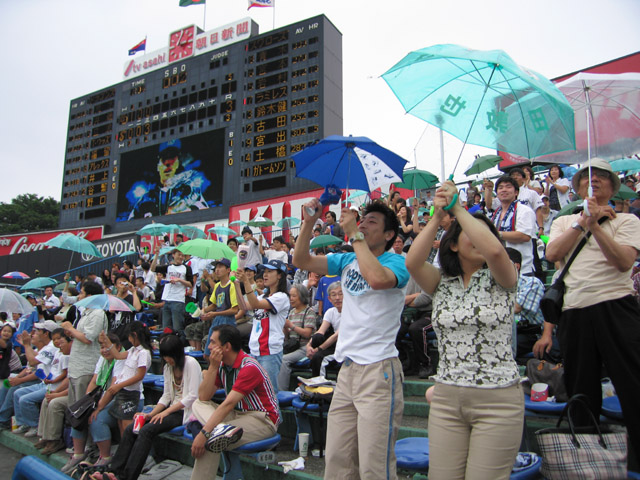
Swallows fans holding umbrellas in 2006

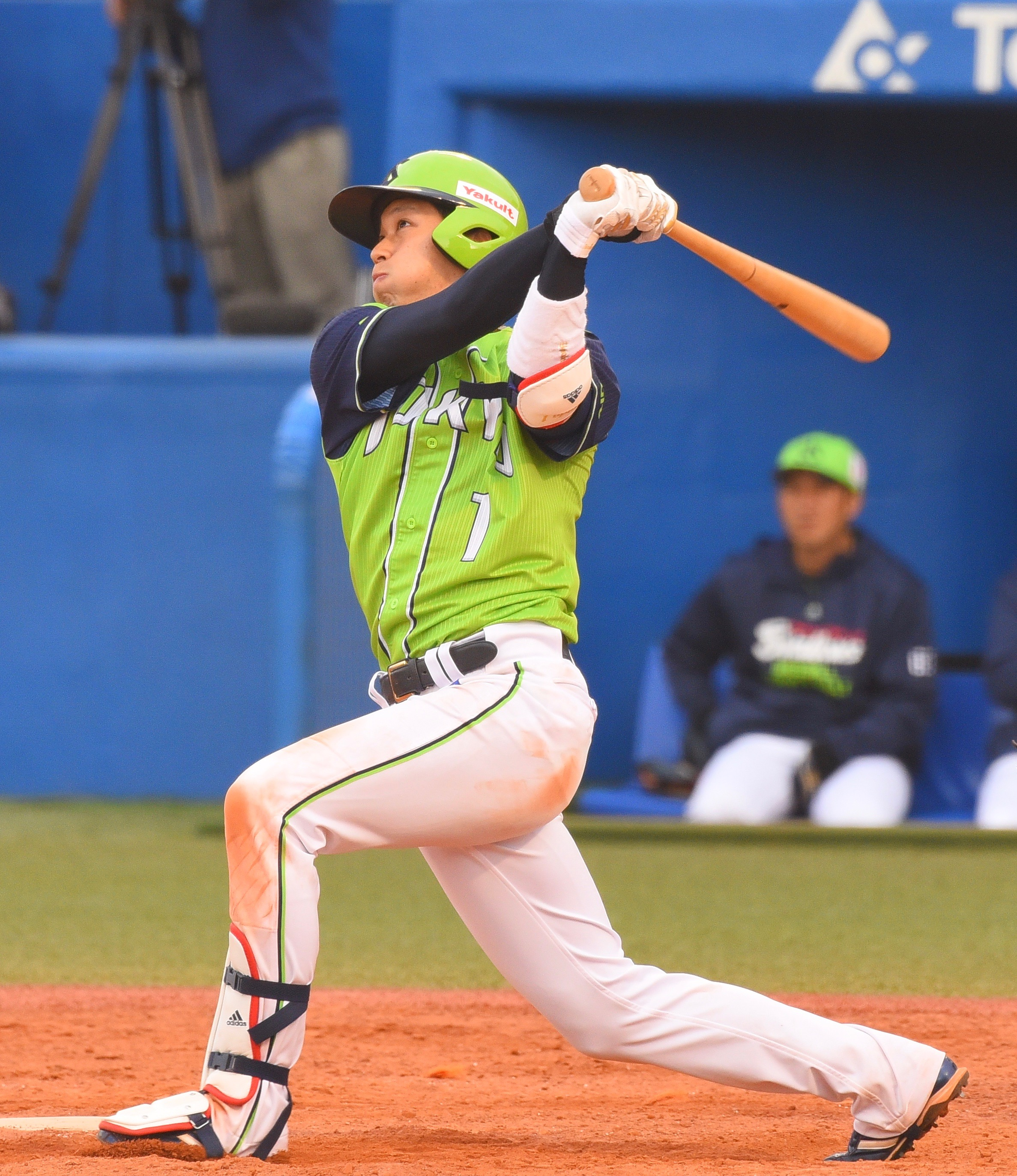
Tetsuto Yamada (2011–present) in 2018

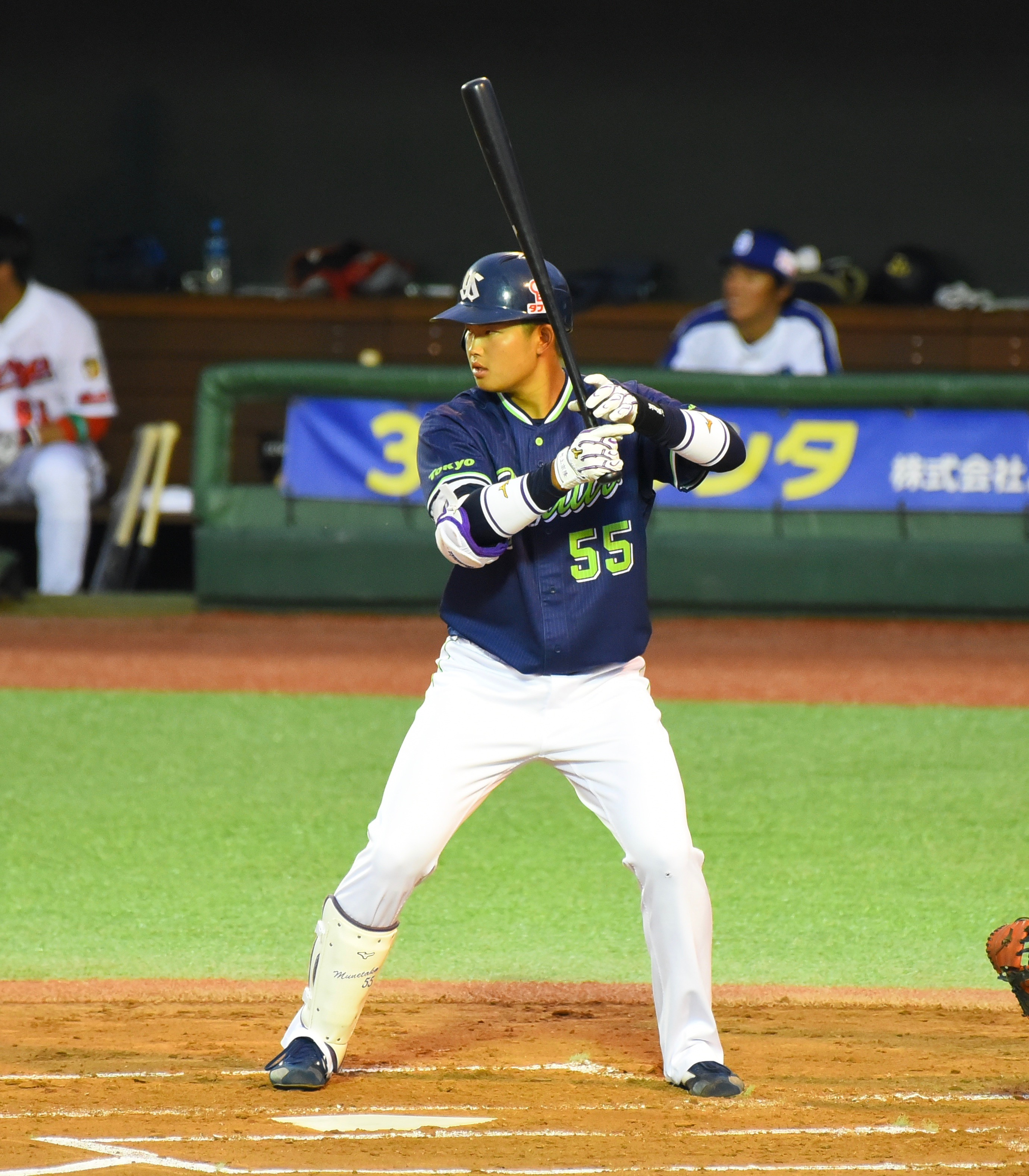
Munetaka Murakami in 2018

== Current roster ==
Tokyo Yakult Swallows roster
First team		Second team
Pitchers: 12 Taichi Ishiyama; 18 Yasunobu Okugawa; 20 Naofumi Kizawa; 21 Kojiro Yoshimura; 29 Yasuhiro Ogawa; 30 Kōta Shōji; 34 Kazuto Taguchi; 40 Hirotoshi Takanashi; 41 Takuya; 43 Shota Masui; 45 Reiji Kozawa; 58 Nash Walters; 66 Kosuke Sakaguchi; Catchers: 2 Yudai Koga; 27 Yuhei Nakamura; 52 Seiya Hashimoto	Infielders: 00 Yoshihiro Akahane; 1 Tetsuto Yamada; 3 Sōma Uchiyama; 8 Eigoro Mogi; 10 Takeshi Miyamoto; 13 José Osuna; 38 Takumi Ishii; 60 Ryusei Takeoka; 67 Ryui Ito; Outfielders: 0 Hidetaka Namiki; 25 Domingo Santana; 63 Shu Masuda; 64 Yukihiro Iwata; 90 Montell; Manager: 88 Takahiro Ikeyama; Coaches: 73 Shingo Kawabata (head); 72 Chikara Onodera (pitching); 98 Hirotoshi Ishii (pitching); 78 Shoitsu Omatsu (chief hitting); 74 Shigeru Sugimura (hitting); 80 Yuji Yoshioka (hitting); 86 Suguru Ino (battery); 75 Takayuki Terauchi (infield defense/baserunning); 82 Yuichi Matsumoto (outfield defense/baserunning/strategy)	Pitchers: 11 José Quijada; 15 Yuto Nakamura; 17 Noboru Shimizu; 19 Masanori Ishikawa; 24 Tomoya Hoshi; 26 Taichi Yamano; 28 Kengo Matsumoto; 33 Taiyo Yamazaki; 35 Yuki Ishihara; 44 Hiroki Ohnishi; 46 Haruki Ohmichi; 47 Keiji Takahashi; 49 Rengo Suzuki; 53 Hiroki Hasegawa; 56 Takumi Sakamoto; 61 Ruito Iida; 62 Jesús Liranzo; 68 Shōta Maruyama; 69 Shunsuke Shimokawa; 70 Yu Hirosawa; 71 Shōhei Numata; 99 Koyo Aoyagi; Catchers: 32 Naoki Matsumoto; 48 Tomoya Kakinuma; 57 Taijiro Yano; 65 Kyō Suzuki	Infielders: 6 Ayuto Matsushita; 7 Hideki Nagaoka; 37 Kakeru Yamanobe; 39 Reo Matsukawa; 50 Keigo Kitamura; 54 Haruto Tanaka; Outfielders: 4 Kazuya Maruyama; 9 Yasutaka Shiomi; 31 Nikita Moiseev; 36 Ruito Nishimura; 42 Ren Sawai; Manager: 79 Noriyuki Shiroishi; Coaches: 79 Noriyuki Shiroishi (chief); 89 Tomohito Ito (pitching coordinator); 81 Itsuki Shoda (head pitching); 92 Tetsuya Yamamoto (pitching); 83 Atsushi Kinugawa (battery); 76 Ryuji Miyade (hitting); 87 Tomochika Tsuboi (hitting); 95 Katsuyuki Dobashi (infield defence/baserunning); 77 Kotaro Yamasaki (outfield defense/baserunning); 91 Yoshinori (pitching/development); 85 Naomichi Nishiura (hitting/development)
Development Players
013 Hyūga Takeyama (P); 014 Kota Nishidate (P); 015 Yume Komiya (P); 016 Yusei Nishihama (P); 017 Shōsei (P); 019 Takuma Sato (P); 022 Ryunosuke Matsumoto (C); 023 Kiyoharu Sawano (IF); 025 Tatsunori Negishi (IF); 026 Sota Takano (IF); 027 Takuma Nakagawa (C)
Updated March 24, 2026		→ All NPB rosters

=== Honoured numbers ===
- 1: Tsutomu Wakamatsu (若松 勉)
- 6: Shinya Miyamoto (宮本 慎也)
- 8: Katsuo Osugi (大杉 勝男)
- 27: Atsuya Furuta (古田 敦也) – Player manager in 2006–2007

== Former players ==
- (Japan) Masaichi Kaneda (1950–1964)
- (Japan) Yukihiko Machida (1952–1964)
- (Japan) Yasumitsu Toyoda (1963–1969)
- (Japan) Hiromu Matsuoka (1968–1985)
- (Japan) Akihiko Ohya (1970–1985)
- (Japan) Yukio Yaegashi (1970–1993)
- (Japan) Takeshi Yasuda (1971–1981)
- (Japan) Tsutomu Wakamatsu (1972–1989)
- (United States) Joe Pepitone (1973)
- (United States) Roger Repoz (1974–1977)
- (United States) Charlie Manuel (1976–1978, 1981)
- (United States) Dave Hilton (1978–1979)
- (Japan) Daisuke Araki (1983–1995)
- (Japan) Hideki Kuriyama (1984–1990)
- (Japan) Takahiro Ikeyama (1984–2002)
- (Japan) Katsumi Hirosawa (1985–1994)
- (United States) Bob Horner (1987)
- (Japan) Tetsuya Iida (1987–2004)
- (Japan) Katsuyuki Dobashi (1987–2006)
- (Japan) Kenji Tomashino (1989–1997)
- (United States) Larry Parrish (1989)
- (United States) Floyd Bannister (1990)
- (Japan) Atsuya Furuta (1990–2007)
- (Japan) Tatsuji Nishimura (1990–1994)
- (United States) Johnny Ray (1991–1992)
- (Japan) Yōichi Okabayashi (1991–2000)
- (United States) Jack Howell (1992–1994)
- (United States) Rex Hudler (1993)
- (Japan) Tomohito Ito (1993–2003)
- (Japan) Mitsuru Manaka (1993–2008)
- (Japan) Futoshi Yamabe (1994–2006)
- (Netherlands) Hensley Meulens (1995–1996)
- (United States) Tom O'Malley (1995–1996)
- (United States) Terry Bross (1995–1997)
- (Japan) Susumu Aoyagi (1995–2002)
- (Japan) Atsunori Inaba (1995–2004)
- (Japan) Shinya Miyamoto (1995–2013)
- (Japan) Hatsuhiko Tsuji (1996–1999)
- (Japan) Shinichi Sato (1996–2005)
- (United States) Dwayne Hosey (1997–1998)
- (Japan) Ryota Igarashi (1998–2009, 2019–2020)
- (United States) Jason Jacome (1999–2000)
- (Venezuela) Roberto Petagine (1999–2002)
- (Venezuela) Alex Ramírez (2001–2007)
- (Japan) Ken Suzuki (2003–2007)
- (Japan) Yuhei (2003–2021)
- (Japan) Norichika Aoki (2004–2011, 2018–2024)
- (Japan) Shingo Kawabata (2006–2025)
- (Canada) Aaron Guiel (2007–2011)
- (South Korea) Lim Chang-yong (2008–2012)
- (Japan) Kazuki Fukuchi (2008–2012)
- (Japan) Yoshinori (2008–2018)
- (United States) Tony Barnette (2010–2015)
- (Japan) Takahiro Araki (2010–2023)
- (Netherlands) Wladimir Balentien (2011–2019)
- (Japan) Naomichi Nishiura (2014–2023)
- (South Korea) Ha Jae-hoon (2016)
- (Japan) Tomotaka Sakaguchi (2016–2022)
- (Japan) Munetaka Murakami (2018–2025)
- (United States) Scott McGough (2019–2022)
- (Japan) Seiichi Uchikawa (2021–2022)
- (Japan) Hiyu Motoyama (2021–2023)
- (United States) Cy Sneed (2021–2024)

== MLB players ==
Active:

- Domingo Santana (2014–2020)
- Jose Osuna (2017–2020)
- Munetaka Murakami (2026–present)

Former:

- Masato Yoshii (1998–2002)
- Kazuhisa Ishii (2002–2005)
- Shingo Takatsu (2004–2005)
- Akinori Iwamura (2007–2010)
- Ryota Igarashi (2010–2012)
- Norichika Aoki (2012–2017)
- Tony Barnette (2016–2019)

== Managers ==
- (Japan) Tokuo Nishigaki (1950–1953)
- (Japan) Soichi Fujita (1954–1955)
- (Japan) Mitsuo Uno (1956–1960)
- (Japan) Kuninobu Sunaoshi (1961–1962)
- (Japan) Shinji Hamazaki (1963)
- (Japan) Giichi Hayashi (1964–1965)
- (Japan) Tokuji Iida (1966–1967)
- (Japan) Takehiko Bessho (1968–1970)
- (Japan) Osamu Mihara (1971–1973)
- (Japan) Hiroshi Arakawa (1974–1976)
- (Japan) Tatsuro Hirooka (1976–1979)
- (Japan) Shiro Takegami (1980–1984)
- (Japan) Masayuki Dobashi (1984–1986)
- (Japan) Junzo Sekine (1987–1989)
- (Japan) Katsuya Nomura (1990–1998)
- (Japan) Tsutomu Wakamatsu (1999–2005)
- (Japan) Atsuya Furuta (2006–2007) – Player/manager
- (Japan) Shigeru Takada (2008–2010)
- (Japan) Junji Ogawa (2011–2014, 2018–2019)
- (Japan) Mitsuru Manaka (2015–2017)
- (Japan) Shingo Takatsu (2020–2025)
- (Japan) Takahiro Ikeyama (2026–present)

== Top starting pitchers ==
Player	Years	Games	Win	Lose	Number of pitches	Strikeout	ERA
Masaichi Kaneda	1950–1964	814	353	267	4920	4065	2.27
Gen'ichi Murata	1957–1969	459	118	140	2154	991	3.05
Hiromu Matsuoka	1968–1985	660	191	190	3240	2008	3.33
Takao Obana	1978–1991	425	112	135	2203	1225	3.82
Masanori Ishikawa	2002–ongoing	525	184	183	3061	1758	3.88

== Mascots ==
The team's mascot is a black swallow with a red face named Tsubakuro (つば九郎, Tsubakurō). He is known for his feuds with the Orix Buffaloes' mascots. He always wears a batting helmet. Whenever the Swallows wear special home uniforms, Tsubakuro also wears the same.

The number on the back of his uniform is "2896" as opposed to 111/222 used by Buffalo Bull and Buffalo Bell, the Buffaloes' mascots.

There is also a female swallow mascot named Tsubami. She wears a skirt and may be intended as Tsubakuro's little sister, just as Bell is Bull's little sister. Unlike her brother, she wears a sports visor.

Before Tsubakuro was created, the team's mascots were Yabo (ヤー坊, Yābō) and Sue-chan (スーちゃん, Sū-chan), who were the team mascots from 1979 to 1994.

The team also had a third mascot named Torcuya (トルクーヤ, Torukūya), a swallow who resembles a professional wrestler. He always carries around a parasol and a bottle of Yakult that he carries on his back.

The team also had a former mascot named Entaro (燕太郎, Entarō), a swallow who wore a jersey with the number 8960. He was replaced by Torcuya in 2014.

== Minor League team ==
The Swallows farm team plays in the Eastern League. The team was founded in 1950.
