= Junji Ogawa =

Japanese baseball player (born 1957)

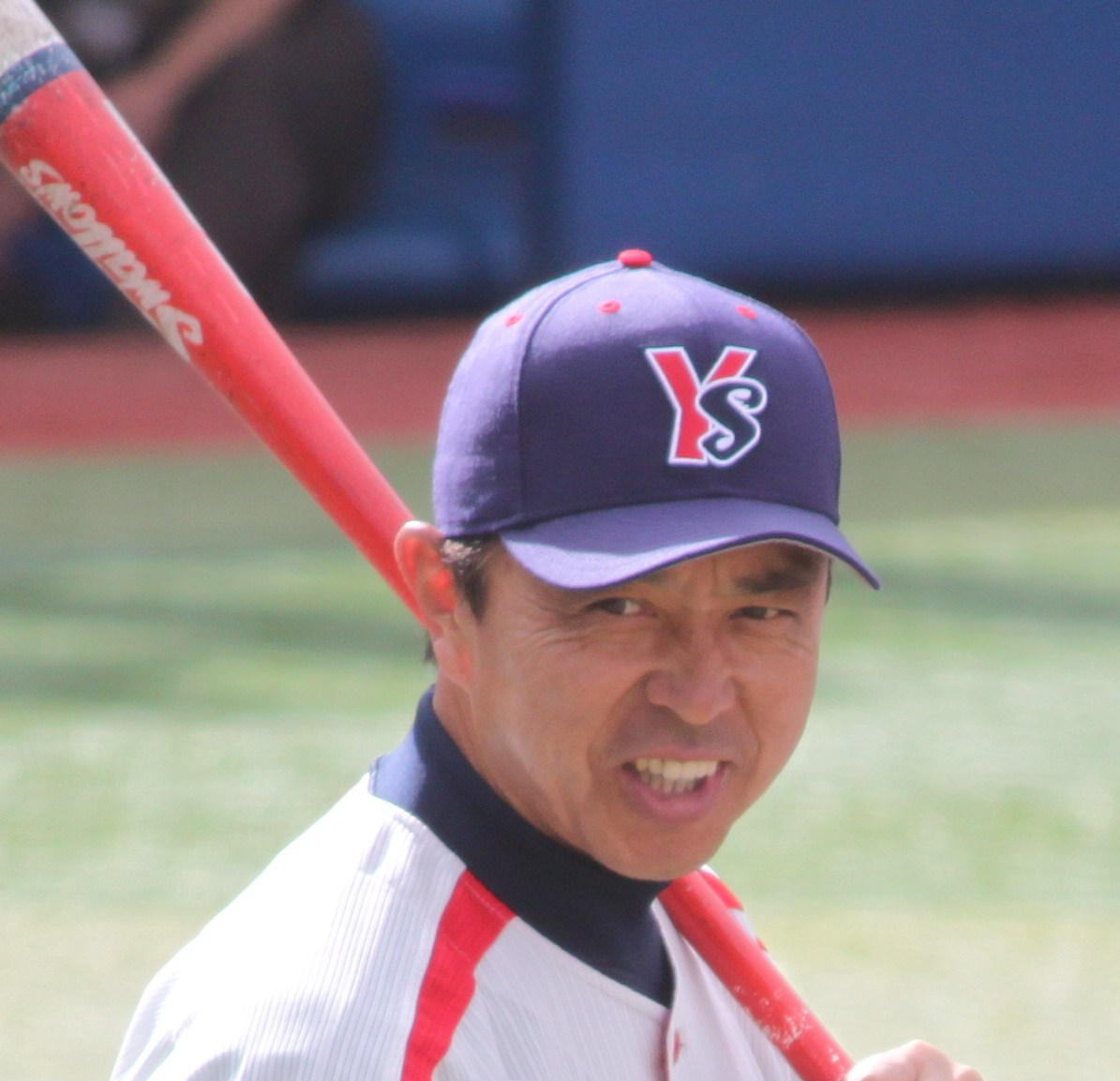
- Born: August 30, 1957 (age 68); Narashino, Chiba, Japan
- Batted: Right Threw: Right

debut
- April 10, 1982, for the Yakult Swallows

Last appearance
- October 13, 1992, for the Nippon-Ham Fighters

Career statistics
- Batting average: .236
- Home runs: 66
- Hits: 412
- Stats at Baseball Reference

Teams
- As player: Yakult Swallows (1982–1991); Nippon-Ham Fighters (1992); As manager: Tokyo Yakult Swallows (2010–2014, 2018–2019); As coach: Yakult Swallows/Tokyo Yakult Swallows (1996–2010)

Junji Ogawa (小川 淳司, Ogawa Junji; born August 30, 1957) was a Japanese Nippon Professional Baseball player. He played for the Yakult Swallows and Nippon-Ham Fighters.
