= 1997 Japan Series =

Team (Wins)	Managers	Season
Yakult Swallows (4)	Katsuya Nomura	83–52–2, .615, GA: 11
Seibu Lions (1)	Osamu Higashio	76–56–3, .576, GA: 5
- Dates: October 18–23
- MVP: Atsuya Furuta (YKS)
- FSA: Kazuo Matsui (SEI)

Broadcast
- Television: TV Asahi (Games 1, 2, 4), Fuji TV (Games 3, 5)
- Radio: NHK Radio, JRN, NRN

The 1997 Japan Series was the championship series of Nippon Professional Baseball (NPB) for the 1997 season. The 48th edition of the Series, it was a best-of-seven playoff that matched the Pacific League champion Seibu Lions against the Central League champion Yakult Swallows. It was the third time the two teams had faced each other for the championship, with the other two contests being in 1992 and 1993. Played at Seibu Dome and Meiji Jingu Stadium, the Swallows defeated the Lions in five games to win the franchise's 4th Japan Series title. The Swallows' star catcher Atsuya Furuta was named Most Valuable Player of the series. The series was played between October 18 and October 23, 1997, with home field advantage going to the Pacific League.

== Summary ==
CL Yakult Swallows (4) vs. PL Seibu Lions (1)

Game	Date	Score	Location	Time	Attendance
1	October 18	Yakult Swallows – 1, Seibu Lions – 0	Seibu Dome	2:41	31,634
2	October 19	Yakult Swallows – 5, Seibu Lions – 6	Seibu Dome	4:45	31,397
3	October 21	Seibu Lions – 3, Yakult Swallows – 5	Meiji Jingu Stadium	3:25	32,867
4	October 22	Seibu Lions – 1, Yakult Swallows – 7	Meiji Jingu Stadium	3:08	32,877
5	October 23	Seibu Lions – 0, Yakult Swallows – 3	Meiji Jingu Stadium	2:50	33,056

== Matchups ==
=== Game 1 ===
Saturday, October 18, 1997 6:20 pm (JST) at Seibu Dome, Tokorozawa, Saitama
Team	1	2	3	4	5	6	7	8	9	R	H	E
Yakult	0	0	0	0	0	0	0	1	0	1	7	0
Seibu	0	0	0	0	0	0	0	0	0	0	3	2
WP: Kazuhisa Ishii (1–0) LP: Fumiya Nishiguchi (0–1); Home runs: YKS: Jim Tatum (1); SEI: None

Game 1 of the series featured a pitching match-up of two strong aces. Seibu's Fumiya Nishiguchi had a career year in 1997 (only his second full season), finishing first in the Pacific League in wins, strikeouts and winning percentage. His sparkling season earned him the Best Nine Award, the Golden Glove, the Sawamura Award and league MVP. Facing him in Game 1 from the visitor's side was Kazuhisa Ishii, a former number-one draft pick and established southpaw who had pitched a no-hitter earlier in the season. The game lived up to its billing as a pitcher's duel, with each starter not allowing any runs after seven innings. However, Yakult finally managed to get to Nishiguchi when journeyman Jim Tatum deposited a slider into the right-center field seats. Ishii protected this lead, and finished the game with no runs allowed and 12 strikeouts.

=== Game 2 ===
Saturday, October 19, 1997 6:21 pm (JST) at Seibu Dome, Tokorozawa, Saitama
Team	1	2	3	4	5	6	7	8	9	10	R	H	E
Yakult	0	2	1	1	0	1	0	0	0	0	5	14	2
Seibu	5	0	0	0	0	0	0	0	0	1	6	13	3
WP: Shinji Mori (1–0) LP: Futoshi Yamabe (0–1); Home runs: YKS: None; SEI: Yusuke Kawada (1)

=== Game 3 ===
Tuesday, October 21, 1997 6:36 pm (JST) at Meiji Jingu Stadium, Shinjuku, Tokyo
Team	1	2	3	4	5	6	7	8	9	R	H	E
Seibu	0	0	2	1	0	0	0	0	0	3	11	1
Yakult	0	3	0	0	0	0	0	2	X	5	11	0
WP: Shingo Takatsu (1–0) LP: Hisanobu Watanabe (0–1); Home runs: SEI: None; YKS: Atsuya Furuta (1)

=== Game 4 ===
Wednesday, October 22, 1997 6:36 pm (JST) at Meiji Jingu Stadium, Shinjuku, Tokyo
Team	1	2	3	4	5	6	7	8	9	R	H	E
Seibu	0	0	1	0	0	0	0	0	0	1	4	0
Yakult	0	0	3	0	0	0	2	2	X	7	13	0
WP: Kenjiro Kawasaki (1–0) LP: Hiroshi Shintani (0–1); Home runs: SEI: None; YKS: Shinichi Sato (1)

=== Game 5 ===
Thursday, October 23, 1997 6:36 pm (JST) at Meiji Jingu Stadium, Shinjuku, Tokyo
Team	1	2	3	4	5	6	7	8	9	R	H	E
Seibu	0	0	0	0	0	0	0	0	0	0	5	0
Yakult	0	2	0	1	0	0	0	0	X	3	9	1
WP: Kazuhisa Ishii (2–0) LP: Fumiya Nishiguchi (0–2) Sv: Shingo Takatsu (1)

== See also ==
- 1997 World Series
