= 1997 Nippon Professional Baseball season =

1997 NPB season
- League: Nippon Professional Baseball
- Sport: Baseball

Regular season
- Season MVP: CL: Atsuya Furuta (YAK); PL: Fumiya Nishiguchi (SEI)

League postseason
- CL champions: Yakult Swallows
- CL runners-up: Yokohama BayStars
- PL champions: Seibu Lions
- PL runners-up: Orix BlueWave

Japan Series
- Champions: Yakult Swallows
- Runners-up: Seibu Lions
- Finals MVP: Atsuya Furuta (YAK)

NPB seasons
- ← 1996 1998 →

The 1997 Nippon Professional Baseball season was the 48th season of operation for the league.

== Regular season standings ==
=== Central League ===
Central League	G	W	L	T	Pct.	GB
Yakult Swallows	137	83	52	2	.615	--
Yokohama BayStars	135	72	63	0	.533	11.0
Hiroshima Toyo Carp	135	66	69	0	.489	17.0
Yomiuri Giants	135	63	72	0	.467	20.0
Hanshin Tigers	136	62	73	1	.459	21.0
Chunichi Dragons	136	59	76	1	.437	24.0

=== Pacific League ===
Pacific League	G	W	L	T	Pct.	GB
Seibu Lions	135	76	56	3	.576	--
Orix BlueWave	135	71	61	3	.538	5.0
Kintetsu Buffaloes	135	68	63	4	.519	7.5
Nippon-Ham Fighters	135	63	71	1	.470	14.0
Fukuoka Daiei Hawks	135	63	71	1	.470	14.0
Chiba Lotte Marines	135	57	76	2	.429	19.5

== Japan Series ==
CL Yakult Swallows (4) vs. PL Seibu Lions (1)

Game	Date	Score	Location	Time	Attendance
1	October 18	Yakult Swallows – 1, Seibu Lions – 0	Seibu Dome	2:41	31,634
2	October 19	Yakult Swallows – 5, Seibu Lions – 6	Seibu Dome	4:45	31,397
3	October 21	Seibu Lions – 3, Yakult Swallows – 5	Meiji Jingu Stadium	3:25	32,867
4	October 22	Seibu Lions – 1, Yakult Swallows – 7	Meiji Jingu Stadium	3:08	32,877
5	October 23	Seibu Lions – 0, Yakult Swallows – 3	Meiji Jingu Stadium	2:50	33,056

== See also ==
- 1997 Major League Baseball season
