= 1993 Japan Series =

Team (Wins)	Managers	Season
Yakult Swallows (4)	Katsuya Nomura	80–50–2, .615, GA: 7
Seibu Lions (3)	Masaaki Mori	74–53–3, .583, GA: 1
- Dates: October 23 – November 1
- MVP: Kenjiro Kawasaki (YKS)
- FSA: Kazuhiro Kiyohara (SEI)

Broadcast
- Television: Canal+ Japan (Games 1), NHK2 (Games 1)
- Radio: NHK Radio 1, TBS (JRN), JOQR (NRN), NBS (NRN), NACK5

The 1993 Japan Series was the championship series of Nippon Professional Baseball (NPB) for the 1993 season. The 44th edition of the Series, it was a best-of-seven playoff that matched the Pacific League champion Seibu Lions against the Central League champion Yakult Swallows. This was the fourth consecutive Japan Series appearance for Seibu and the second consecutive championship contested between the two clubs, with Seibu taking the crown the year before. Played at Seibu Lions Stadium and Meiji Jingu Stadium, the Swallows defeated the Lions four games to three in the best-of-seven series to win the franchise's 2nd Japan Series title. Yakult pitcher Kenjiro Kawasaki was named Most Valuable Player of the series. The series was played between October 23 and November 1 with home field advantage going to the Pacific League.

== Summary ==
CL Yakult Swallows (4) vs. PL Seibu Lions (3)

Game	Date	Score	Location	Time	Attendance
1	October 23	Yakult Swallows – 8, Seibu Lions – 5	Seibu Lions Stadium	3:39	31,785
2	October 24	Yakult Swallows – 5, Seibu Lions – 2	Seibu Lions Stadium	3:34	32,169
3	October 26	Seibu Lions – 7, Yakult Swallows – 2	Meiji Jingu Stadium	2:38	30,147
4	October 27	Seibu Lions – 0, Yakult Swallows – 1	Meiji Jingu Stadium	2:51	33,882
5	October 28	Seibu Lions – 7, Yakult Swallows – 2	Meiji Jingu Stadium	3:19	35,208
6	October 31	Yakult Swallows – 2, Seibu Lions – 4	Seibu Lions Stadium	2:49	32,020
7	November 1	Yakult Swallows – 4, Seibu Lions – 2	Seibu Lions Stadium	2:48	32,028

== Matchups ==
=== Game 1 ===
Saturday, October 23, 1993 at Seibu Lions Stadium, Tokorozawa, Saitama
Team	1	2	3	4	5	6	7	8	9	R	H	E
Yakult	3	1	1	0	1	0	2	0	0	8	12	2
Seibu	1	2	0	0	0	1	0	0	1	5	9	1
WP: Daisuke Araki (1–0) LP: Kimiyasu Kudoh (0–1); Home runs: YKS: Jack Howell (1), Takahiro Ikeyama (1); SEI: Tsutomu Ito (1), Koji Akiyama (1)

=== Game 2 ===
Sunday, October 24, 1993 at Seibu Lions Stadium, Tokorozawa, Saitama
Team	1	2	3	4	5	6	7	8	9	R	H	E
Yakult	1	0	3	1	0	0	0	0	0	5	13	1
Seibu	2	0	0	0	0	0	0	0	0	2	8	0
WP: Tatsuji Nishimura (1–0) LP: Kuo Tai-yuan (0–1) Sv: Shingo Takatsu (1)

=== Game 3 ===
Tuesday, October 26, 1993 at Meiji Jingu Stadium, Shinjuku, Tokyo
Team	1	2	3	4	5	6	7	8	9	R	H	E
Seibu	0	0	6	0	1	0	0	0	0	7	14	1
Yakult	0	0	0	1	0	0	0	1	0	2	2	2
WP: Hisanobu Watanabe (1–0) LP: Akimitsu Itoh (0–1); Home runs: SEI: Norio Tanabe (1), Koji Akiyama (2); YKS: None

=== Game 4 ===
Wednesday, October 27, 1993 at Meiji Jingu Stadium, Shinjuku, Tokyo
Team	1	2	3	4	5	6	7	8	9	R	H	E
Seibu	0	0	0	0	0	0	0	0	0	0	6	0
Yakult	0	0	0	1	0	0	0	0	X	1	5	0
WP: Kenjiro Kawasaki (1–0) LP: Takehiro Ishii (0–1) Sv: Shingo Takatsu (2)

=== Game 5 ===
Thursday, October 28, 1993 at Meiji Jingu Stadium, Shinjuku, Tokyo
Team	1	2	3	4	5	6	7	8	9	R	H	E
Seibu	0	1	0	0	0	0	1	0	5	7	7	0
Yakult	0	0	0	0	0	0	0	1	1	2	6	0
WP: Yoshitaka Katori (1–0) LP: Kenji Miyamoto (0–1) Sv: Tetsuya Shiozaki (1); Home runs: SEI: Kazuhiro Kiyohara (1), Ken Suzuki (1); YKS: Yukio Arai (1)

=== Game 6 ===
Sunday, October 31, 1993 at Seibu Lions Stadium, Tokorozawa, Saitama
Team	1	2	3	4	5	6	7	8	9	R	H	E
Yakult	0	0	0	0	0	0	0	1	1	2	7	1
Seibu	0	0	0	4	0	0	0	0	X	4	4	1
WP: Kuo Tai-yuan (1–1) LP: Tatsuji Nishimura (1–1) Sv: Tetsuya Shiozaki (2); Home runs: YKS: None; SEI: Koji Akiyama (3)

=== Game 7 ===
Monday, November 1, 1993 at Seibu Lions Stadium, Tokorozawa, Saitama
Team	1	2	3	4	5	6	7	8	9	R	H	E
Yakult	3	0	0	0	0	0	0	1	0	4	5	0
Seibu	2	0	0	0	0	0	0	0	0	2	4	1
WP: Kenjiro Kawasaki (2–0) LP: Hisanobu Watanabe (1–1) Sv: Shingo Takatsu (3); Home runs: YKS: Katsumi Hirosawa (1); SEI: Kazuhiro Kiyohara (2)

== See also ==
- 1993 World Series
