= 1991 Japan Series =

Team (Wins)	Managers	Season
Seibu Lions (4)	Masaaki Mori	81–43–6, .653, GA: 4.5
Hiroshima Toyo Carp (3)	Koji Yamamoto	74–56–2, .569, GA: 3
- Dates: October 19–28
- MVP: Koji Akiyama (SEI)
- FSA: Kazuhisa Kawaguchi (HIR)

Broadcast
- Television: TBS (Game 1), TV Asahi (Games 2,7), RCC (Game 3), HOME (Games 4-5), NHK General TV (Game 4), HTV (Game 5), Fuji TV (Game 6), NHK BS-1 (All Games)
- Radio: NHK Radio 1, TBS (JRN), JOQR (NRN), JOLF (NRN), NACK5

The 1991 Japan Series was the championship series of Nippon Professional Baseball (NPB) for the 1991 season. The 42nd edition of the Series, it was a best-of-seven playoff that matched the Pacific League champion Seibu Lions against the Central League champion Hiroshima Toyo Carp. Seibu won their second consecutive PL pennant to reach the series, and Hiroshima finished first in the CL for the sixth time in franchise history. Played at Seibu Lions Stadium and Hiroshima Municipal Stadium, the Lions defeated the Carp four games to three in the best-of-seven series to win the franchise's 10th Japan Series title. Seibu slugger and regular season stolen-base champion Koji Akiyama was named Most Valuable Player of the series. The series was played between October 19 and October 28 with home field advantage going to the Pacific League.

== Summary ==
PL Seibu Lions (4) vs. CL Hiroshima Toyo Carp (3)

Game	Date	Score	Location	Time	Attendance
1	October 19	Hiroshima Toyo Carp – 3, Seibu Lions – 11	Seibu Lions Stadium	2:48	31,770
2	October 20	Hiroshima Toyo Carp – 4, Seibu Lions – 2	Seibu Lions Stadium	3:11	31,903
3	October 22	Seibu Lions – 1, Hiroshima Toyo Carp – 0	Hiroshima Municipal Stadium	3:37	27,713
4	October 23	Seibu Lions – 3, Hiroshima Toyo Carp – 7	Hiroshima Municipal Stadium	3:06	28,591
5	October 24	Seibu Lions – 0, Hiroshima Toyo Carp – 3	Hiroshima Municipal Stadium	2:51	28,669
6	October 26	Hiroshima Toyo Carp – 1, Seibu Lions – 6	Seibu Lions Stadium	3:03	31,900
7	October 28	Hiroshima Toyo Carp – 1, Seibu Lions – 7	Seibu Lions Stadium	3:20	32,011

== Matchups ==
=== Game 1 ===
Saturday, October 19, 1991 at Seibu Lions Stadium, Tokorozawa, Saitama
Team	1	2	3	4	5	6	7	8	9	R	H	E
Hiroshima	0	1	0	0	0	0	0	0	2	3	5	2
Seibu	3	0	2	6	0	0	0	0	X	11	10	1
WP: Kimiyasu Kudoh (1–0) LP: Shinji Sasaoka (0–1); Home runs: HIR: Rod Allen (1); SEI: Kazuhiro Kiyohara (1), Orestes Destrade (1), Koji Akiyama (1), Hiromichi Ishige (1)

=== Game 2 ===
Sunday, October 20, 1991 at Seibu Lions Stadium, Tokorozawa, Saitama
Team	1	2	3	4	5	6	7	8	9	R	H	E
Hiroshima	1	0	0	0	3	0	0	0	0	4	5	1
Seibu	0	0	0	2	0	0	0	0	0	2	5	0
WP: Kazuhisa Kawaguchi (1–0) LP: Kuo Tai-yuan (0–1) Sv: Yutaka Ohno (1)

=== Game 3 ===
Tuesday, October 22, 1991 at Hiroshima Municipal Stadium, Hiroshima, Hiroshima
Team	1	2	3	4	5	6	7	8	9	R	H	E
Seibu	0	0	0	0	0	0	0	1	0	1	6	1
Hiroshima	0	0	0	0	0	0	0	0	0	0	5	1
WP: Hisanobu Watanabe (1–0) LP: Manabu Kitabeppu (0–1); Home runs: SEI: Koji Akiyama (2); HIR: None

=== Game 4 ===
Wednesday, October 23, 1991 at Hiroshima Municipal Stadium, Hiroshima, Hiroshima
Team	1	2	3	4	5	6	7	8	9	R	H	E
Seibu	0	0	0	0	0	0	0	3	0	3	3	1
Hiroshima	1	1	0	3	0	0	2	0	X	7	12	1
WP: Shinji Sasaoka (1–1) LP: Tomio Watanabe (0-1); Home runs: SEI: None; HIR: Takashi Osanai (1)

=== Game 5 ===
Thursday, October 24, 1991 at Hiroshima Municipal Stadium, Hiroshima, Hiroshima
Team	1	2	3	4	5	6	7	8	9	R	H	E
Seibu	0	0	0	0	0	0	0	0	0	0	6	0
Hiroshima	0	0	2	1	0	0	0	0	X	3	8	1
WP: Kazuhisa Kawaguchi (2–0) LP: Kimiyasu Kudoh (1–1) Sv: Yutaka Ohno (2); Home runs: SEI: None; HIR: Rod Allen (2)

=== Game 6 ===
Saturday, October 26, 1991 at Seibu Lions Stadium, Tokorozawa, Saitama
Team	1	2	3	4	5	6	7	8	9	R	H	E
Hiroshima	0	0	0	1	0	0	0	0	0	1	4	0
Seibu	1	0	0	0	0	5	0	0	X	6	12	0
WP: Takehiro Ishii (1–0) LP: Akihito Kaneishi (0–1); Home runs: HIR: None; SEI: Koji Akiyama (3)

=== Game 7 ===
Monday, October 28, 1991 at Seibu Lions Stadium, Tokorozawa, Saitama
Team	1	2	3	4	5	6	7	8	9	R	H	E
Hiroshima	0	1	0	0	0	0	0	0	0	1	4	0
Seibu	0	0	0	0	3	0	4	0	X	7	11	0
WP: Kimiyasu Kudoh (2–1) LP: Shinji Sasaoka (1–2); Home runs: HIR: None; SEI: Koji Akiyama (4)

== See also ==
- 1991 World Series
