= 1992 Japan Series =

Japanese baseball championship

Team (Wins)	Managers	Season
Seibu Lions (4)	Masaaki Mori	80–47–3, .630, GA: 4.5
Yakult Swallows (3)	Katsuya Nomura	69–61–1, .531, GA: 2
- Dates: October 17–26
- MVP: Takehiro Ishii (SEI)
- FSA: Yoichi Okabayashi (YKS)

Broadcast
- Television: Fuji TV (Games 1,6), TV Asahi (Games 2,4,5,7) TBS (Game 3), NHK BS-1 (All Games)
- Radio: NHK Radio 1, TBS (JRN), JOQR (NRN), NBS (NRN), NACK5

The 1992 Japan Series was the championship series of Nippon Professional Baseball (NPB) for the 1992 season. The 43rd edition of the Series, it was a best-of-seven playoff that matched the Pacific League champion Seibu Lions against the Central League champion Yakult Swallows. Seibu won their third consecutive PL pennant in convincing fashion to reach the series, and Yakult finished the season atop the competitive CL for the first time since 1978. Played at Meiji Jingu Stadium and Seibu Lions Stadium, the Lions defeated the Swallows four games to three in the best-of-seven series to win the franchise's 11th Japan Series title. Seibu's Sawamura Award winner Takehiro Ishii was named Most Valuable Player of the series. The series was played between October 17 and October 26 with home field advantage going to the Central League.

== Summary ==
PL Seibu Lions (4) vs. CL Yakult Swallows (3)

Game	Date	Score	Location	Time	Attendance
1	October 17	Seibu Lions – 3, Yakult Swallows – 7	Meiji Jingu Stadium	4:04	34,767
2	October 18	Seibu Lions – 2, Yakult Swallows – 0	Meiji Jingu Stadium	3:21	35,876
3	October 21	Yakult Swallows – 1, Seibu Lions – 6	Seibu Lions Stadium	3:24	31,370
4	October 22	Yakult Swallows – 0, Seibu Lions – 1	Seibu Lions Stadium	2:38	31,457
5	October 23	Yakult Swallows – 7, Seibu Lions – 6	Seibu Lions Stadium	3:53	31,489
6	October 25	Seibu Lions – 7, Yakult Swallows – 8	Meiji Jingu Stadium	4:10	35,391
7	October 26	Seibu Lions – 2, Yakult Swallows – 1	Meiji Jingu Stadium	4:05	34,101

== Matchups ==
=== Game 1 ===
Saturday, October 17, 1992 at Meiji Jingu Stadium, Shinjuku, Tokyo
Team	1	2	3	4	5	6	7	8	9	10	11	12	R	H	E
Seibu	0	1	0	0	0	0	1	0	1	0	0	0	3	10	0
Yakult	0	0	2	0	0	1	0	0	0	0	0	4	7	14	0
WP: Yoichi Okabayashi (1–0) LP: Yoshitaka Katori (0–1); Home runs: SEI: Orestes Destrade 2 (2); YKS: Atsuya Furuta (1), Toru Sugiura (1)

=== Game 2 ===
Sunday, October 18, 1992 at Meiji Jingu Stadium, Shinjuku, Tokyo
Team	1	2	3	4	5	6	7	8	9	R	H	E
Seibu	0	0	0	0	0	2	0	0	0	2	8	0
Yakult	0	0	0	0	0	0	0	0	0	0	3	1
WP: Kuo Tai-yuan (1–0) LP: Daisuke Araki (0–1) Sv: Tetsuya Shiozaki (1)

=== Game 3 ===
Wednesday, October 21, 1992 at Seibu Lions Stadium, Tokorozawa, Saitama
Team	1	2	3	4	5	6	7	8	9	R	H	E
Yakult	0	0	0	0	0	0	1	0	0	1	5	0
Seibu	0	0	0	2	0	0	0	4	X	6	11	0
WP: Takehiro Ishii (1–0) LP: Kazuhisa Ishii (0–1); Home runs: YKS: Katsumi Hirosawa (1); SEI: None

=== Game 4 ===
Thursday, October 22, 1992 at Seibu Lions Stadium, Tokorozawa, Saitama
Team	1	2	3	4	5	6	7	8	9	R	H	E
Yakult	0	0	0	0	0	0	0	0	0	0	5	0
Seibu	0	0	0	1	0	0	0	0	X	1	4	1
WP: Yoshitaka Katori (1–1) LP: Yoichi Okabayashi (1–1) Sv: Tetsuya Shiozaki (2); Home runs: YKS: None; SEI: Koji Akiyama (1)

=== Game 5 ===
Friday, October 23, 1992 at Seibu Lions Stadium, Tokorozawa, Saitama
Team	1	2	3	4	5	6	7	8	9	10	R	H	E
Yakult	0	0	0	3	2	1	0	0	0	1	7	11	1
Seibu	0	0	0	0	0	5	1	0	0	0	6	11	0
WP: Akimitsu Itoh (1–0) LP: Tetsuya Shiozaki (0–1); Home runs: YKS: Jack Howell (1), Takahiro Ikeyama (1); SEI: Orestes Destrade (3)

=== Game 6 ===
Sunday, October 25, 1992 at Meiji Jingu Stadium, Shinjuku, Tokyo
Team	1	2	3	4	5	6	7	8	9	10	R	H	E
Seibu	0	1	0	2	0	3	0	0	1	0	7	6	0
Yakult	0	0	2	2	0	1	2	0	0	1	8	14	1
WP: Akimitsu Itoh (2–0) LP: Tetsuya Shiozaki (0–2); Home runs: SEI: Hiromichi Ishige (1), Ken Suzuki (1); YKS: Hideki Hashigami (1), Takahiro Ikeyama (2), Jack Howell (2), Shinji Hata (1)

=== Game 7 ===
Monday, October 26, 1992 at Meiji Jingu Stadium, Shinjuku, Tokyo
Team	1	2	3	4	5	6	7	8	9	10	R	H	E
Seibu	0	0	0	0	0	0	1	0	0	1	2	8	1
Yakult	0	0	0	1	0	0	0	0	0	0	1	9	1
WP: Takehiro Ishii (2–0) LP: Yoichi Okabayashi (1–2)

== See also ==
- 1992 World Series
