= Hiroshi Shintani =

Japanese baseball player (born 1964)

- Pitcher / Coach
- Born: July 14, 1964 (age 61); Saga, Saga, Japan
- Batted: Right Threw: Right

NPB debut
- April 7, 1992, for the Seibu Lions

Last NPB appearance
- October 1, 2001, for the Nippon-Ham Fighters

NPB statistics
- Win–loss record: 54–47
- Earned run average: 3.64
- Strikeouts: 724
- Saves: 14

Teams
- As player: Seibu Lions (1992–1999); Nippon-Ham Fighters (2000–2001); As coach: Nippon-Ham Fighters/Hokkaido Nippon-Ham Fighters (2002–2004)

Career highlights and awards
- 1× Japan Series champion (1992); 1× NPB All-Star (1994); 1× Pacific League ERA Champion (1994)

Hiroshi Shintani (新谷 博, Shintani Hiroshi; born July 14, 1964) is a former professional baseball player from Saga, Saga, Japan.
