= Tomio Watanabe =

Japanese baseball player (born 1967)

Saitama Seibu Lions – No. 98
- Pitcher / Coach
- Born: June 23, 1967 (age 58); Takaoka District, Kōchi, Japan
- Batted: Left Threw: Right

NPB debut
- June 2, 1989, for the Seibu Lions

Last NPB appearance
- October 30, 1997, for the Fukuoka Daiei Hawks

NPB statistics
- Win–loss record: 45–40
- Earned run average: 3.73
- Strikeouts: 502
- Saves: 2
- Stats at Baseball Reference

Teams
- As player: Seibu Lions (1989–1993, 1998); Fukuoka Daiei Hawks (1994–1997); As coach: Saitama Seibu Lions (2025–)

Career highlights and awards
- 3× Japan Series champion (1990, 1991, 1992); NPB All-Star (1990); Pacific League ERA Champion (1991)
Medals
Men's baseball
Representing Japan
Olympic Games
Silver medal – second place	1988 Seoul	Team

Tomio Watanabe (渡辺 智男, Watanabe Tomio; born June 23, 1967) is a former professional baseball player from Takaoka, Kōchi, Japan.
