= Jacky Jakoba =

Dutch baseball player (1961–2022)

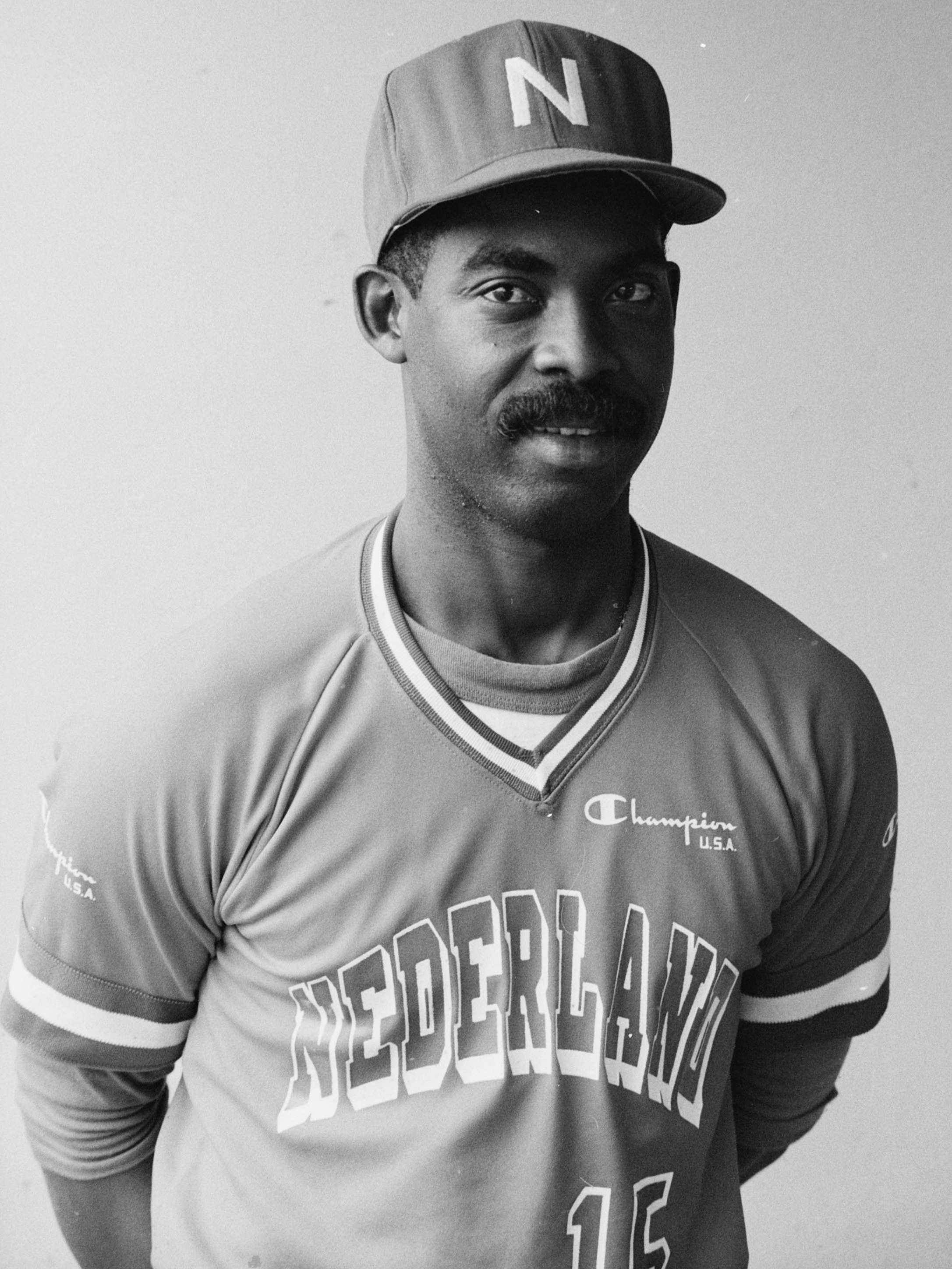
- Jakoba with the Netherlands national baseball team in 1990
- Born: Sedney Jakoba; 25 September 1961; Willemstad, Curaçao
- Died: 17 December 2022 (aged 61); Rotterdam, Netherlands
- Batted: Right Threw: Right
Medals
Men's baseball
Representing Netherlands
European Championship
Gold medal – first place	1985 Netherlands	National team
Gold medal – first place	1987 Barcelona	National team

Sedney Jakoba (25 September 1961 – 17 December 2022) was a Curaçaoan baseball player who played for the Netherlands national team in international tournaments, including the 1988 Summer Olympics. He holds the single-season home run record in the Dutch Honkbal Hoofdklasse, hitting 24 home runs in 1984.

== Biography ==
=== Club career ===
Jakoba played with Quick Amersfoort from 1982–1983. In 1983, he hit 13 home runs for this club in one season, besting the Dutch record previously held by Hudson John with 12. From 1984 to 1987, Jakoba played with Neptunus in Rotterdam. In 1984, he hit 24 home runs, which is still Dutch league's single-season record, as of the end of the 2025 season. In 1988, he played with Almere Giants and in 1989 he signed a contract with Haarlem Nicols, but didn't play during the season. He played in Belgium with Antwerp Eagles. In 1990 he returned to the Netherlands and played with Sparta-Feyenoord in Rotterdam that season. In 1991 he played with SV ADO and in 1992 with Quick in Amersfoort.

=== National team ===
Between 1984 and 1991, Jakoba was a member of the Netherlands national baseball team and played 84 matches. He made his debut at the 1984 Haarlem Baseball Week. He played with the national team in three European Championships, four World Championships, and the 1988 Summer Olympics. He further played three editions of the Haarlem Baseball Week and three World Port Tournaments. He became European champion in 1985 and 1987.

=== Death ===
Jakoba died on 17 December 2022, at the age of 61.
