= Tatsuji Nishimura =

Japanese baseball player

- Pitcher
- Born: July 18, 1968; Kure, Hiroshima, Japan
- Batted: Right Threw: Right

NPB debut
- April 10, 1991, for the Yakult Swallows

Last appearance
- April 14, 2001, for the Fukuoka Daiei Hawks

NPB statistics (through 2001)
- Win–loss record: 75–68
- Earned run average: 3.76
- Strikeouts: 719
- Saves: 2

Teams
- Yakult Swallows (1990–1994); Kintetsu Buffaloes (1995–1997); Fukuoka Daiei Hawks (1998–2001)

Career highlights and awards
- Comeback Player of the Year (1998); 2× NPB All-Star (1991, 1998); 2× Japan Series champion (1993, 1999)
- Last updated on: 9 May 2020

Tatsuji Nishimura (西村 龍次, Nishimura Tatsuji; born July 18, 1968, in Kure, Hiroshima, Japan) is a Japanese former Nippon Professional Baseball pitcher.
