= Naka District =

Naka District may refer to the following districts in Japan:

- Naka District, Ibaraki, containing Tōkai
- Naka District, Kanagawa, containing Ōiso and Ninomiya
- Naka District, Kyōto, containing Mineyama and Omiya, Kyōtango
- Naka District, Shimane, containing Hamada
- Naka District, Tokushima, containing Asan and Naka
