= Pat Murphy (baseball manager) =

American baseball manager (born 1958)

- Murphy at the 2026 Brewers World Series Championship parade.

Milwaukee Brewers – No. 00
- Manager / Coach
- Born: November 28, 1958 (age 67); Syracuse, New York, U.S.
- Bats: Right Throws: Right

College statistics
- Head coaching record: 947–400–2
- Winning %: .703

MLB statistics (through September 25, 2026)
- Managerial record: 333–247
- Winning %: .574
- Stats at Baseball Reference
- Managerial record at Baseball Reference

Teams
- College: Notre Dame (1988–1994); Arizona State (1995–2009); As manager: San Diego Padres (2015); Milwaukee Brewers (2024–present); As coach: Milwaukee Brewers (2016–2023)

Career highlights and awards
- College: 4× Pac-10 regular season (2000, 2007–2009); MLB: World Series champion (2026); 3× NL Manager of the Year (2024–2026)
Medals
Men's baseball
Manager for the Netherlands
European Championship
Gold medal – first place	1987 Spain	Team

Patrick Thomas Murphy (born November 28, 1958) is an American professional baseball coach who is the manager for the Milwaukee Brewers of Major League Baseball (MLB). He previously served as the interim manager of the San Diego Padres and head coach for college baseball teams including Arizona State University and the University of Notre Dame, as well as the Netherlands national team.

Murphy joined the Brewers organization as its bench coach from 2016 to 2023 before being promoted to manager ahead of the 2024 season. In his first three seasons, Milwaukee won three consecutive National League Central championships, with Murphy named the National League (NL) Manager of the Year from 2024–2026. In 2026, he managed the Brewers to a franchise-best 103–59 (.636) record, ultimately winning the first National League pennant (second overall in franchise history, after the 1982 AL pennant) and first World Series championship in franchise history.

== Playing career ==
Murphy said he "couldn't find a place." He attended Le Moyne, and Bowling Green State (playing football and baseball), before attending Florida Atlantic University, where he played college baseball for the FAU Owls as a catcher and infielder. He also pitched on occasion. He was honored on FAU's 20th Anniversary Team as a pitcher and utility player, and in 2008 was inducted into the school's baseball hall of fame.

Murphy signed a professional baseball contract with the San Francisco Giants in 1982 and played four years in the minor leagues for the Giants, San Diego Padres, and for two independent teams.

== Coaching career ==
=== College ===
Murphy served as the head baseball coach and assistant football coach for the Maryville College Fighting Scots in 1982 and 1983. In 1985, he was hired as head baseball coach and assistant football coach for the Claremont-Mudd-Scripps Stags. He was hired by the University of Notre Dame as the head coach of the Notre Dame Fighting Irish on July 11, 1987. Murphy led the Fighting Irish to a 318–116–1 (.732), including consecutive trips to NCAA regional finals in 1992, 1993, and 1994.

Arizona State University (ASU) hired Murphy as the head coach of the ASU Sun Devils in 1995. The Sun Devils won the Pac-10 Conference championship in 2000 and consecutive Pac-10 championships in 2007, 2008, and 2009. Twice in that decade, Murphy's teams finished in the top 3 in the country, a feat matched by only ten other schools. Murphy's ASU teams were consistently ranked in the national top 25, including a streak of 100 consecutive weeks in the polls from 2000 to 2005. Murphy led the Sun Devils to the postseason for nine consecutive seasons and 11 of 12 seasons. His teams set an NCAA record of not being shut out in 506 consecutive games between 1995 and 2004, breaking the previous streak of 349, held by the Coastal Carolina Chanticleers through 2001.

Murphy became the youngest collegiate coach to reach 500 career victories in 1998. In 1998, he won Baseball America's Coach of the Year award and was Pac-10 Coach of the Year four times (2000, 2007, 2008, 2009). He led ASU to the College World Series four times (1998, 2005, 2007, 2009).

On November 20, 2009, Murphy resigned in the middle of an investigation of ASU's baseball program. It was initially reported that the resignation was his own decision. But in December 2009, The Arizona Republic reported that on the day he resigned, Murphy had been given an ultimatum: resign or be fired. The NCAA investigation found Murphy innocent of violations regarding student-athlete employment and recruiting, reprimanding him solely for treating investigators with a "cavalier attitude". But the ASU athletic department was faulted for lack of institutional control, resulting in the baseball program being sanctioned and banned from postseason play in the 2012 season, as ASU was a repeat offender. Murphy's career record at ASU was 629–284–1.

=== Netherlands national team ===
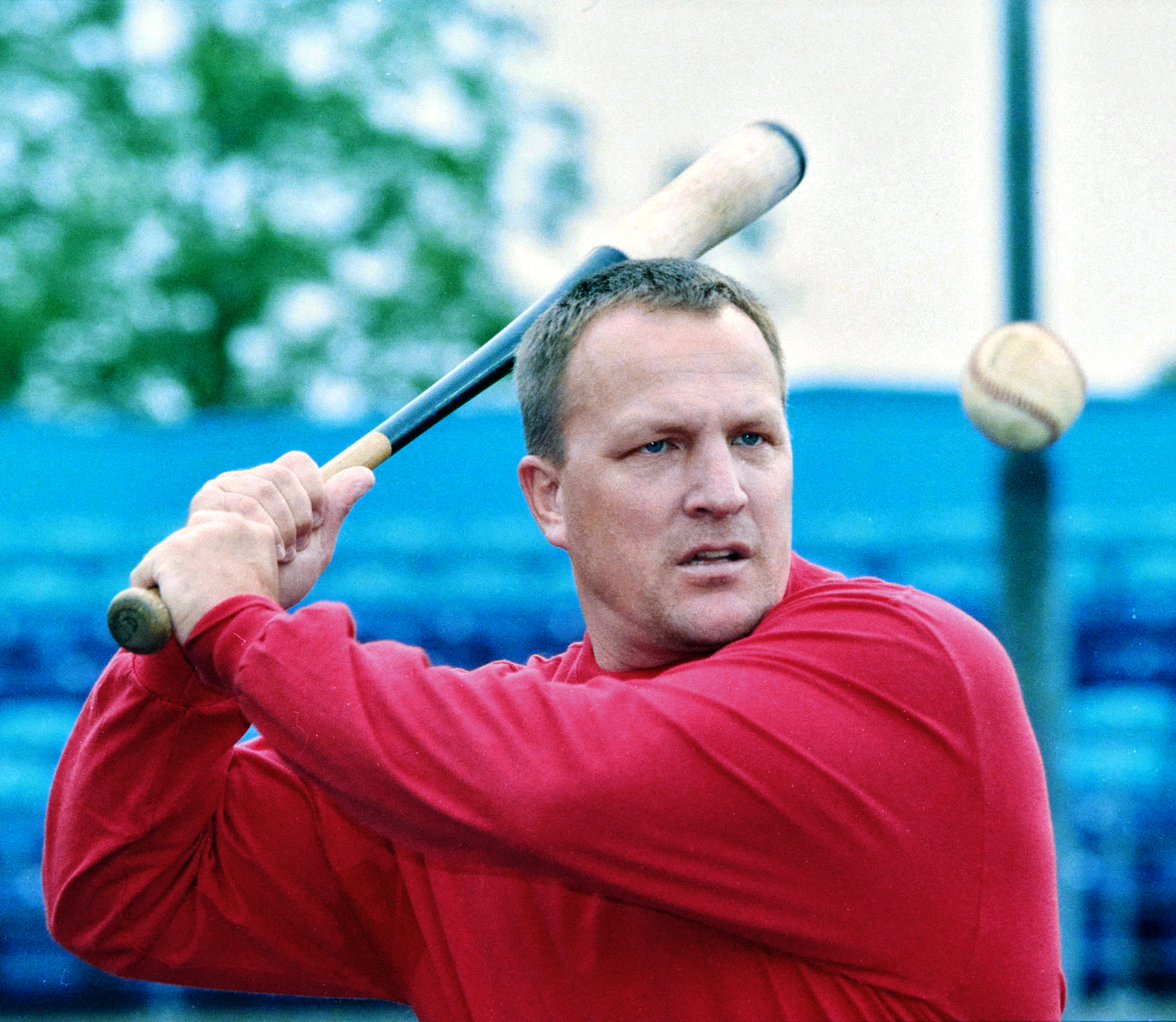
Murphy in the Netherlands in 2000

Murphy was named the manager of the Netherlands national team, at the advice of former Claremont and Netherlands coach Bill Arce, for the 1987 World Port Tournament and 1987 European Baseball Championship. The Netherlands beat Italy in the European championship, qualifying them for the 1988 Summer Olympics in Seoul. Murphy then became Notre Dame's coach, and the Dutch replaced Murphy with former Northern Colorado Bears coach Tom Petroff for the Olympics.

Murphy returned to manage the Dutch team at the 2000 Summer Olympics in Sydney. The Netherlands finished fifth with a 3–4 record, missing the medal round but winning against Cuba, which until that time were undefeated at the Olympics. Three of his players, Robert Eenhoorn, Hensley Meulens, and Evert-Jan 't Hoen, would later manage the Netherlands team.

=== San Diego Padres (2010–2015) ===
In February 2010, Murphy was hired by the San Diego Padres as a special assistant to baseball operations. Murphy skippered the Padres' Northwest League affiliate, the Eugene Emeralds, as their manager for the 2011 and 2012 seasons, as the Emeralds had consecutive league-best overall season records. While in Eugene, he had a 93–47 record (.664 pct).

Murphy managed the Tucson Padres of the Triple-A Pacific Coast League (PCL) in 2013 and the El Paso Chihuahuas of the PCL in 2014 and 2015. In 2015, the Milwaukee Brewers wanted to hire Murphy as a major league coach on Craig Counsell's coaching staff; Murphy coached Counsell at Notre Dame. The Padres refused to allow him to join the Brewers, even though it would constitute a promotion.

On June 16, 2015, Murphy was appointed interim manager of the Padres, after manager Bud Black was fired. Immediately after the season, the Padres announced that Murphy would not be retained as manager.

=== Milwaukee Brewers (2015–present) ===
After the 2015 season, the Milwaukee Brewers hired Murphy as bench coach for Craig Counsell's coaching staff; Murphy was Counsell's coach during his playing career at Notre Dame. On June 11, 2023, Murphy filled in as manager for Counsell, who missed the game due to his son's graduation. The Brewers lost the game 8-6.

After the 2023 season, Counsell accepted the managerial position for the Chicago Cubs. On November 16, the Brewers promoted Murphy to serve as their new manager.

Before the 2024 season, some analysts and reporters predicted the Brewers would finish low in the NL Central due to Counsell's departure, the loss of several players including ace pitcher Corbin Burnes, and Murphy’s limited experience as an MLB manager. Under Murphy, however, the Brewers exceeded expectations. On September 18, the Brewers became the first team to clinch a postseason spot and won the NL Central. They finished the regular season with a 93–69 record, tied for the fourth-best record in baseball, and played the New York Mets in a Wild Card Series. Milwaukee lost to the Mets in 3 games. For the unexpected success despite significant injury troubles and starting pitching woes, Murphy received the NL Manager of the Year Award, the first Brewers manager to earn this distinction.

In 2025, Murphy led the Brewers to the best record in the league, and at the time most wins in franchise history, going 97–65 and again winning the NL Central. The Brewers faced the rival Cubs in the NL Division Series (NLDS), ultimately winning the series 3–2. Milwaukee was swept 4–0 by the eventual World Series champion Los Angeles Dodgers in the NL Championship Series (NLCS). The Dodgers held the Brewers to a .118 batting average during the sweep, the worst average by any team in a postseason series of at least three games in MLB history.

On November 11, Murphy was named NL Manager of the Year for a second consecutive season. Cleveland Guardians manager Stephen Vogt won AL Manager of the Year Award in 2024 and 2025, marking the first time both leagues had repeat winners of the award in the same season. Murphy and Vogt are also the first managers to win the award in their first two seasons managing a team.

On February 19, 2026, Murphy and the Brewers agreed to a new three-year contract with a club option for the 2029 season, which included $8.95 million in new money.

Murphy bested his franchise record with a 103–59 record, clinching the best record in the majors in 2026. The Brewers earned a bye through the Wild Card Series, then defeated the San Diego Padres 3 games to 1 in the NLDS. Facing the Dodgers in the NLCS for the second year in a row, Murphy flipped the script as the Brewers swept the Dodgers for their first NL pennant, and their first World Series appearance since 1982, when they represented the American League. The Brewers won the 2026 World Series, beating the Tampa Bay Rays 4 games to 1.

On November 11, Murphy was named NL Manager of the Year for a third consecutive season.

=== Managerial record ===
==== Major League Baseball ====
As of October 28, 2026

Team	Year	Regular season					Postseason			
Team	Year	Games	Won	Lost	Win %	Finish	Won	Lost	Win %	Result
SD	2015	96	42	54	.438	4th in NL West	–	–	–	
SD total		96	42	54	.438		0	0	–	
MIL	2024	162	93	69	.574	1st in NL Central	1	2	.333	Lost NLWC (NYM)
MIL	2025	162	97	65	.599	1st in NL Central	3	6	.333	Lost NLCS (LAD)
MIL	2026	162	103	59	.636	1st in NL Central	11	2	.846	Won World Series (TB)
MIL Total		486	293	193	.603		15	10	.600	
Total		582	335	247	.576		15	10	.600	

==== NCAA Division I ====
Record table
Season	Team	Overall	Conference	Standing	Postseason
Notre Dame Fighting Irish (Midwestern Collegiate Conference) (1988–1994)
1988	Notre Dame	39–22	11–3	1st (North)	
1989	Notre Dame	48–19–1	21–9	2nd (North)	NCAA Regional
1990	Notre Dame	46–12	25–3	1st (North)	
1991	Notre Dame	45–16	18–5	2nd	
1992	Notre Dame	48–15	18–2	1st	NCAA Regional
1993	Notre Dame	46–16	23–4	1st	NCAA Regional
1994	Notre Dame	46–16	24–4	1st	NCAA Regional
Notre Dame:		318–116–1	140–30		
Arizona State Sun Devils (Pac-10 Conference) (1995–2009)
1995	Arizona State	34–21	13–17	4th (South)	
1996	Arizona State	35–21	14–16	4th (South)	
1997	Arizona State	39–22	16–14	4th (South)	NCAA Regional
1998	Arizona State	41–23	18–11	3rd (South)	College World Series Runner-up
1999	Arizona State	39–21	12–12	5th	
2000	Arizona State	44–15	17–7	T–1st	NCAA Regional
2001	Arizona State	37–20–1	14–10	T–3rd	NCAA Regional
2002	Arizona State	37–21	15–9	T–3rd	NCAA Regional
2003	Arizona State	53–12	16–8	2nd	NCAA Super Regional
2004	Arizona State	41–18	13–11	4th	NCAA Regional
2005	Arizona State	42–25	15–9	T–3rd	College World Series
2006	Arizona State	37–21	14–10	2nd	NCAA Regional
2007	Arizona State	49–15	19–5	1st	College World Series
2008	Arizona State	49–13	16–8	1st	NCAA Super Regional
2009	Arizona State	51–14	21–6	1st	College World Series
Arizona State:		629–284–1	233–153		
Total:		947–400–2			
National champion Postseason invitational champion Conference regular season champion Conference regular season and conference tournament champion Division regular season champion Division regular season and conference tournament champion Conference tournament champion

== Personal life ==
Murphy has been married and divorced three times. He has one daughter and three sons. His daughter, Keli, married Pedro Álvarez in 2011. Murphy's son, Kai, has played as an outfielder in the San Diego Padres' organization. He has two grandchildren.

Murphy had a heart attack at a team workout in July 2020. He was hospitalized and implanted with a stent before being discharged. He returned to the team in September.
