= Ebisu =

Ebisu, also transliterated Yebisu, may refer to:

- Ebisu ([è̞.bʲí.sɨ́]), a god in Japanese mythology
- Ebisu, Shibuya ([é̞.bʲì.sɨ̀]), a neighborhood in Tokyo, Japan
- Ebisu Station (Tokyo), a train station located in Tokyo's Shibuya ward, Japan
- Ebisu Station (Hyogo), a train station located in Miki, Hyogo, Japan
- Yebisu, a brand of Japanese beer
- Ebisu Circuit, a motorsport circuit in Fukushima Prefecture, Japan
- Evisu, Japanese jeans brand
- Ebisu ([é̞.bʲì.sɨ̀, è̞.bʲí.sɨ́]), an alternate pronunciation of the Emishi people who lived in northeastern Honshū, Japan
- Ebisu, a character from the manga and anime series Naruto; see List of Naruto characters

== People with the surname ==
- Etsunobu Ebisu, Japanese video game producer
- Nobuyuki Ebisu (戎 信行; born 1972), Japanese baseball player
- Yoshikazu Ebisu (蛭子能収; born 1947), Japanese manga artist and actor
