= Kenjiro Kawasaki =

Japanese baseball player

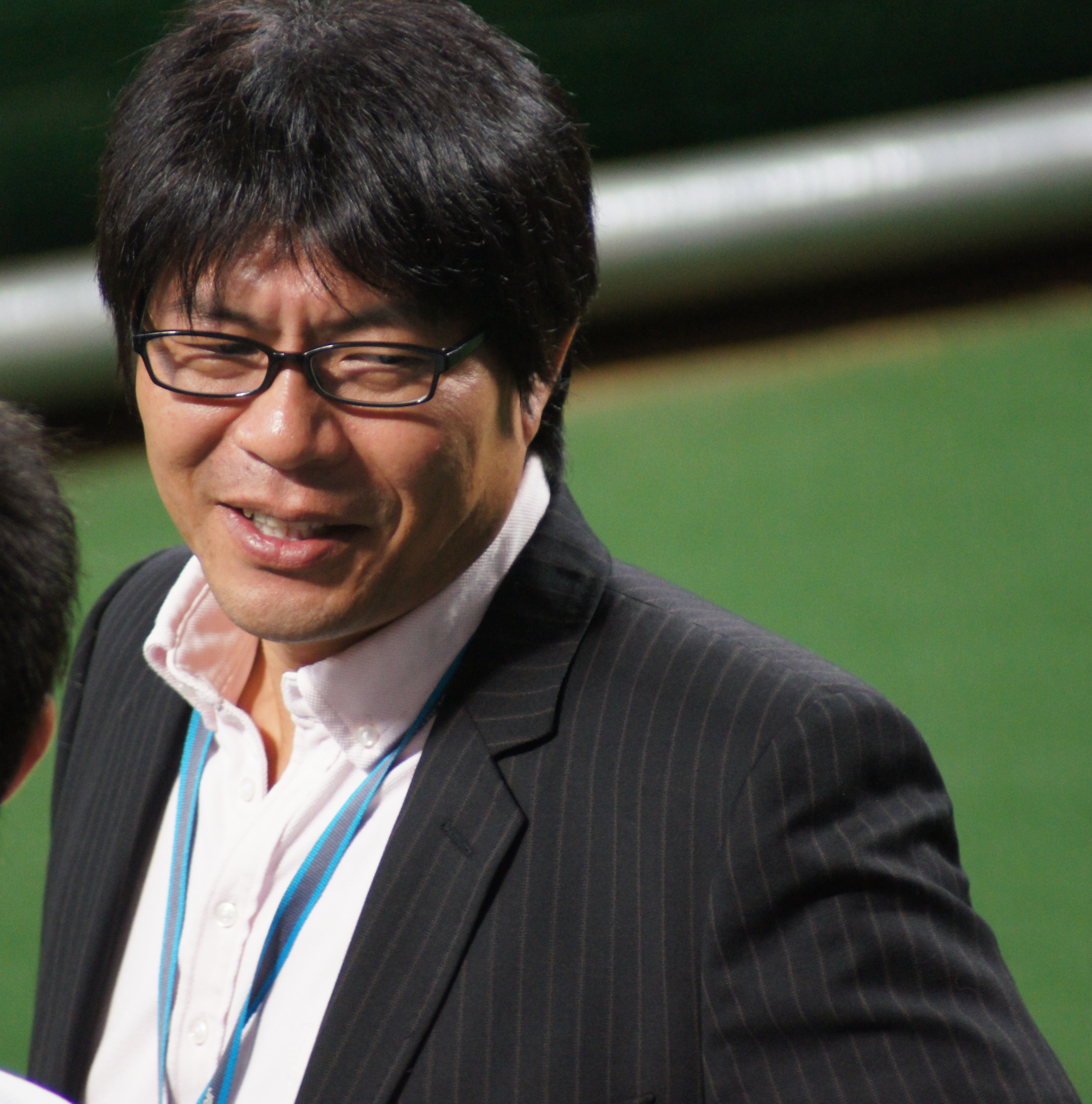
- Pitcher / Coach
- Born: January 8, 1971 (age 54); Saiki, Ōita, Japan
- Batted: Right Threw: Right

NPB debut
- May 9, 1989, for the Yakult Swallows

Last NPB appearance
- October 3, 2004, for the Chunichi Dragons

NPB statistics
- Win–loss record: 88-81
- Saves: 2
- ERA: 3.69
- Strikeouts: 874

Teams
- As player: Yakult Swallows (1989–2000); Chunichi Dragons (2001–2004); As coach: Chiba Lotte Marines (2013–2014)

Career highlights and awards
- 3×Japan Series champion (1993, 1995, 1997); Japan Series Most Valuable Player Award (1993); PL Win title (1998); 1998 Eiji Sawamura Award; Comeback Player of the Year (1993); 4×NPB All-Star (1990, 1991, 1998, 2000)
- Last updated on: 11 January 2016

Kenjiro Kawasaki (川崎 憲次郎, born January 8, 1971) is a former Nippon Professional Baseball pitcher.
