= Rikkert Faneyte =

Dutch baseball player (born 1969)

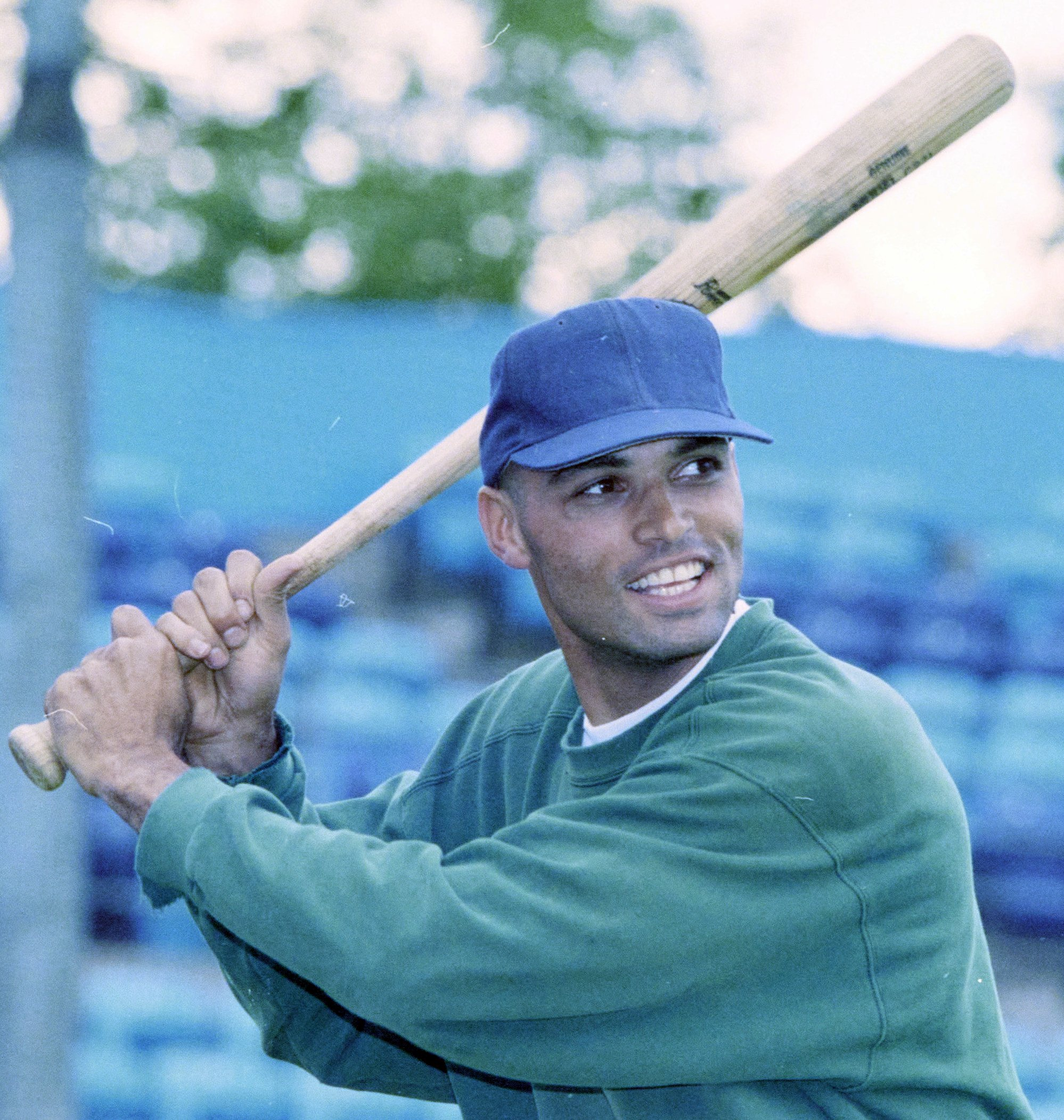
- Faneyte in 2000
- Outfielder / Pitcher
- Born: May 31, 1969 (age 56); Amsterdam, Netherlands
- Batted: Right Threw: Right

MLB debut
- August 29, 1993, for the San Francisco Giants

Last MLB appearance
- May 29, 1996, for the Texas Rangers

MLB statistics
- Batting average: .174
- Home runs: 0
- Runs batted in: 9
- Stats at Baseball Reference

Teams
- San Francisco Giants (1993–1995); Texas Rangers (1996)
Medals
Men's baseball
Representing Netherlands
European Baseball Championship
Gold medal – first place	1987 Spain	Team
Gold medal – first place	1999 Italy	Team

Rikkert Faneyte (born May 31, 1969) is a Dutch former professional baseball outfielder. He played in Major League Baseball from 1993 to 1996 for the San Francisco Giants and Texas Rangers. He was a member of the Netherlands national team that finished in fifth place at 1988 and 2000 Summer Olympics.

== Professional career ==
Faneyte grew up playing baseball starting at the age of four in the Netherlands and played college baseball at Miami-Dade South Junior College. He was teammates with future MLB pitcher Alex Fernandez.

The San Francisco Giants drafted Faneyte in the 16th round of the 1990 MLB draft. He was a California League All-Star in 1992. He made his major league debut with the Giants in late August 1993, becoming the third player from the Netherlands to play in the majors, after pitchers Bert Blyleven and Win Remmerswaal. He was named a Pacific Coast League All-Star after that season. The Giants traded Faneyte to the Texas Rangers after the 1995 season. He never topped a .200 batting average in parts of four seasons in the majors. Faneyte was traded to the Cincinnati Reds in December 1996 but never played in an official game for the organization.

Faneyte also played for the Amsterdam Pirates of Honkbal Hoofdklasse after finishing his American career. The team retired his number 19 in 2001. Faneyte managed Amsterdam in 2008, winning the Holland Series and the national coach of the year award, and 2009.

== International career ==
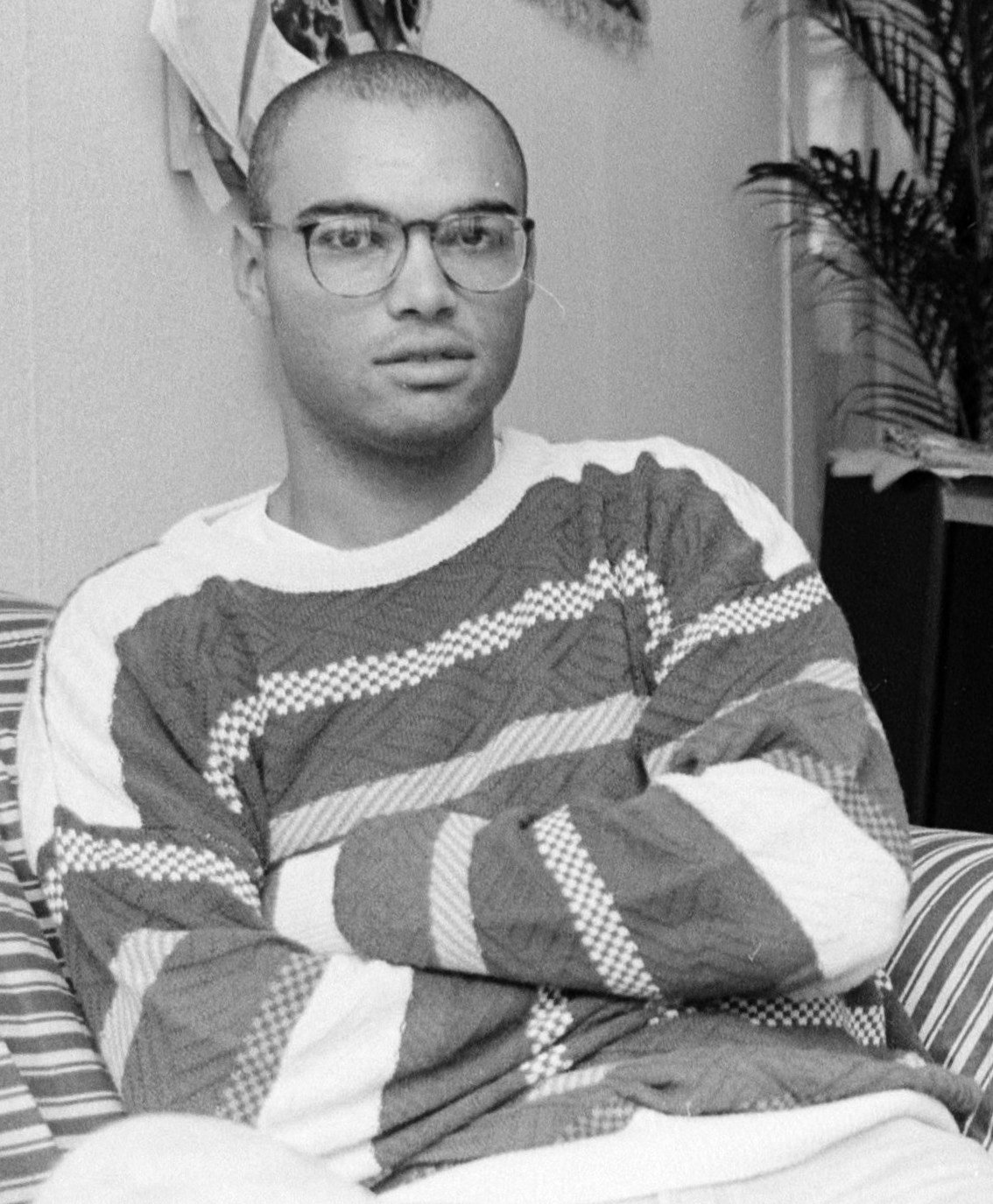
Faneyte in 1994

In 1985, Faneyte won the Ron Fraser Award, as the best Dutch youth player. In 1990, he won the Guus van der Heijden Memorial Trophy, given to the best Netherlands national team player younger than 23.

Faneyte played for the Netherlands in two Summer Olympics as well as other international tournaments. He was on Dutch teams that finished fifth in both 1988, when baseball was a demonstration sport, and 2000. He earned a save in the Netherlands' 2000 Olympics 4–2 win against Cuba, which was Cuba's first-ever loss in the Olympics. He also took the loss against South Africa, allowing a 10th-inning home run.

Faneyte won two European championships with the Netherlands and was the most valuable player of the 1987 European championship. He scored the most runs in the 1999 championship, which qualified the team for the 2000 Olympics.
