= Hirofumi Ogawa =

Japanese baseball player and coach (born 1967)

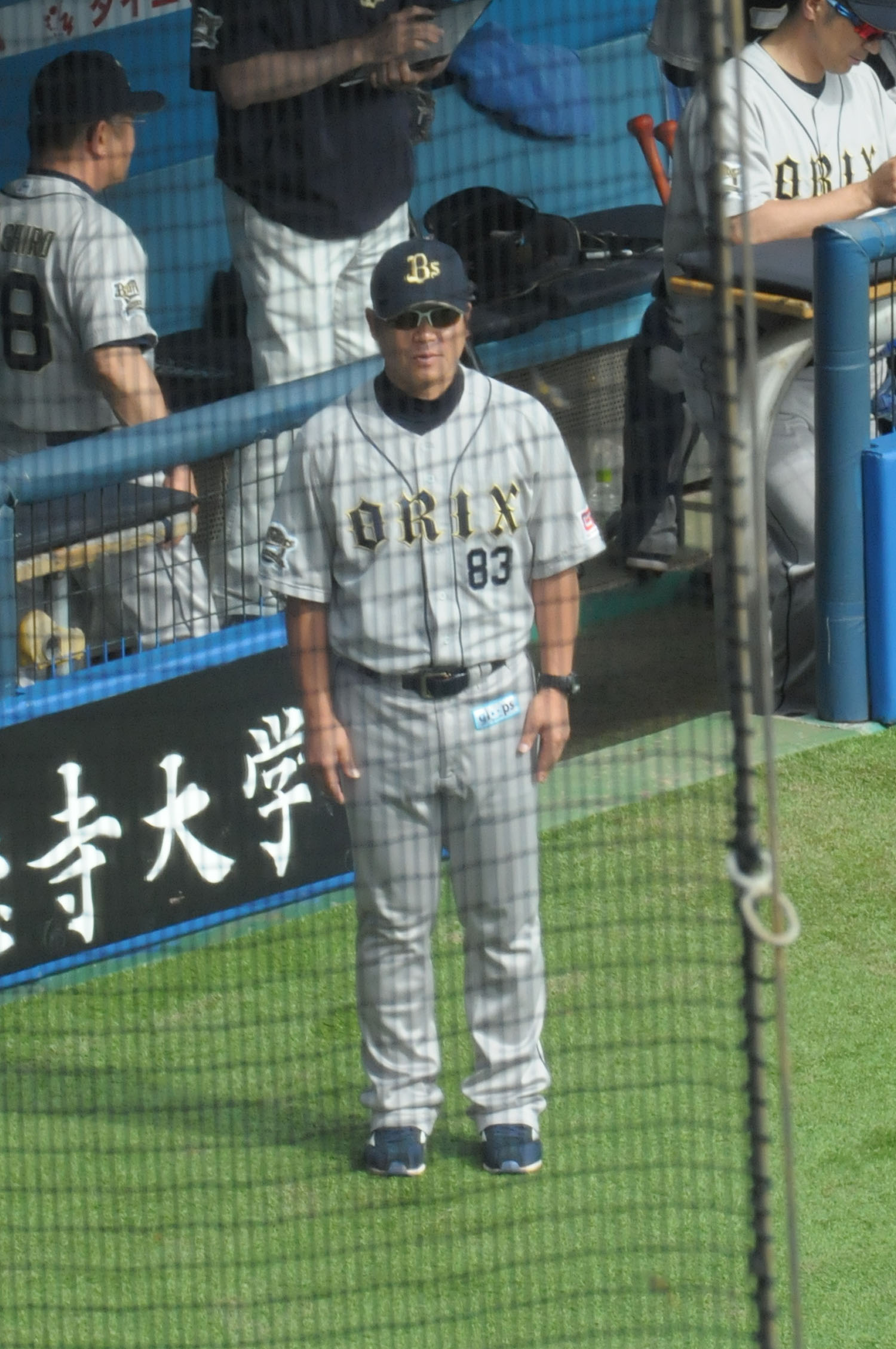
- Infielder / Coach
- Born: March 6, 1967 (age 59); Tateyama, Chiba
- Batted: Right Threw: Right

NPB debut
- April 9, 1989, for the Orix Braves

Last NPB appearance
- August 9, 2003, for the Yokohama BayStars

NPB statistics
- Batting average: .267
- Home runs: 100
- Runs batted in: 597
- Stats at Baseball Reference

Teams
- As player: Orix Braves/Orix BlueWave (1989–2000); Yokohama BayStars (2001–2004); As coach: Orix Buffaloes (2008, 2010–2012, 2014–2015); Yokohama DeNA BayStars (2016–2018)

Career highlights and awards
- Japan Series champion (1996); 3× NPB All-Star (1991–1992, 1994); Best Nine Award (1991)
Medals
Men's baseball
Representing Japan
Olympic Games
Silver medal – second place	1988 Seoul	Team

Hirofumi Ogawa (小川 博文, Ogawa Hirofumi; born March 6, 1967) is a former Japanese Nippon Professional Baseball player.
