= Kanagi, Shimane =

Kanagi 金城町
- City
- Flag
- Interactive map of Kanagi
- Country: Japan
- Prefecture: Shimane
- District: Naka
- Merged: October 1, 2005 (now part of Hamada)

Area
  - Total: 164.30 km^{2} (63.44 sq mi)

Population (2003)
  - Total: 5,066
  - Density: 30.83/km^{2} (79.8/sq mi)
- Time zone: UTC+09:00 (JST)
- Website: Town of Kanagi at the Wayback Machine (archive index)

Kanagi (金城町, Kanagi-chō) was a town located in Naka District, Shimane Prefecture, Japan.

As of 2003, the town had an estimated population of 5,066 and a density of 30.83 persons per km^{2}. The total area was 164.30 km^{2}.

On October 1, 2005, Kanagi, along with the towns of Asahi and Misumi, and the village of Yasaka (all from Naka District), was merged into the expanded city of Hamada.
