= Yasaka, Shimane =

Dissolved municipality in Shimane prefecture, Japan

Yasaka (弥栄村, Yasaka-mura) was a village located in Naka District, Shimane Prefecture, Japan.

As of 2003, the village had an estimated population of 1,718 and a density of 16.28 persons per km^{2}. The total area was 105.50 km^{2}.

On October 1, 2005, Yasaka, along with the towns of Asahi, Kanagi and Misumi (all from Naka District), was merged into the expanded city of Hamada.
