= List of Nippon Professional Baseball earned run average champions =

The List of Nippon Professional Baseball earned run average (ERA) (最優秀防御率) champions.

== Winners ==
=== Japanese Baseball League (1937–1949) ===
Year	Player	Team	ERA
1936 (Fall)	Masaru Kageura	Osaka Tigers	0.79
1937 (Spring)	Eiji Sawamura	Tokyo Kyojingun	0.81
1937 (Fall)	Yukio Nishimura	Osaka Tigers	1.48
1938 (Spring)	Yukio Nishimura	Osaka Tigers	1.52
1938 (Fall)	Victor Starffin	Tokyo Kyojingun	1.05
1939	Tadashi Wakabayashi	Osaka Tigers	1.09
1940	Jiro Noguchi	Tsubasagun	0.93
1941	Jiro Noguchi	Taiyogun	0.88
1942	Yasuo Hayashi	Asahigun	1.01
1943	Hideo Fujimoto	Tokyo Kyojingun	0.73
1944	Tadashi Wakabayashi	Hanshingun	1.56
1945	Season suspended		
1946	Hideo Fujimoto	Tokyo Kyojingun	2.11
1947	Giichiro Shiraki	Tokyu Flyers	1.74
1948	Hiroshi Nakao	Yomiuri Giants	1.84
1949	Hideo Fujimoto	Yomiuri Giants	1.94

=== Nippon Professional Baseball (1950–present) ===
Year	Central League			Pacific League		
Year	Player	Team	ERA	Player	Team	ERA
1950	Nobuo Oshima	Shochiku Robins	2.03	Atsushi Aramaki	Mainichi Orions	2.06
1951	Kiyoshi Matsuda	Yomiuri Giants	2.01	Susumu Yuki	Nankai Hawks	2.08
1952	Tabayoshi Kajioka	Osaka Tigers	1.71	Susumu Yuki	Nankai Hawks	1.91
1953	Takumi Otomo	Yomiuri Giants	1.85	Tokuji Kawasaki	Nishitetsu Lions	1.98
1954	Shigeru Sugishita	Chunichi Dragons	1.39	Motoji Takuwa	Nankai Hawks	1.58
1955	Takehiko Bessho	Yomiuri Giants	1.33	Takashi Nakagawa	Mainichi Orions	2.08
1956	Shozo Watanabe	Osaka Tigers	1.45	Kazuhisa Inao	Nishitetsu Lions	1.06
1957	Masaichi Kaneda	Kokutetsu Swallows	1.63	Kazuhisa Inao	Nishitetsu Lions	1.37
1958	Masaichi Kaneda	Kokutetsu Swallows	1.30	Kazuhisa Inao	Nishitetsu Lions	1.42
1959	Minoru Murayama	Osaka Tigers	1.19	Tadashi Sugiura	Nankai Hawks	1.40
1960	Noboru Akiyama	Taiyo Whales	1.75	Shoichi Ono	Daimai Orions	1.98
1961	Hiroshi Gondo	Chunichi Dragons	1.70	Kazuhisa Inao	Nishitetsu Lions	1.69
1962	Minoru Murayama	Hanshin Tigers	1.20	Osamu Kubota	Toei Flyers	2.12
1963	Minoru Kakimoto	Chunichi Dragons	1.70	Hiroyuki Kubo	Kintetsu Buffaloes	2.36
1964	Gene Bacque	Hanshin Tigers	1.89	Yoshiro Tsumajima	Tokyo Orions	2.15
1965	Masaichi Kaneda	Yomiuri Giants	1.84	Kiyohiro Miura	Nankai Hawks	1.57
1966	Tsuneo Horiuchi	Yomiuri Giants	1.39	Kazuhisa Inao	Nishitetsu Lions	1.79
1967	Masatoshi Gondo	Hanshin Tigers	1.40	Mitsuhiro Adachi	Hankyu Braves	1.75
1968	Yoshiro Sotokoba	Hiroshima Toyo Carp	1.94	Mutsuo Minagawa	Nankai Hawks	1.61
1969	Yutaka Enatsu	Hanshin Tigers	1.81	Masaaki Kitaru	Lotte Orions	1.72
1970	Minoru Murayama	Hanshin Tigers	0.98	Michio Sato	Nankai Hawks	2.05
1971	Kazuhiro Fujimoto	Hiroshima Toyo Carp	1.71	Hisashi Yamada	Hankyu Braves	2.37
1972	Takeshi Yasuda	Yakult Atoms	2.08	Toshihiko Sei	Kintetsu Buffaloes	2.36
1973	Takeshi Yasuda	Yakult Atoms	2.02	Tetsuya Yoneda	Hankyu Braves	2.47
1974	Shitoshi Sekimoto	Yomiuri Giants	2.28	Michio Sato	Nankai Hawks	1.91
1975	Sohachi Aniya	Hanshin Tigers	1.91	Choji Murata	Lotte Orions	2.20
1976	Takamasa Suzuki	Chunichi Dragons	2.98	Choji Murata	Lotte Orions	1.82
1977	Hisao Niura	Yomiuri Giants	2.32	Hisashi Yamada	Hankyu Braves	2.28
1978	Hisao Niura	Yomiuri Giants	2.81	Keishi Suzuki	Kintetsu Buffaloes	2.02
1979	Masaji Hiramatsu	Taiyo Whales	2.39	Tetsuji Yamaguchi	Kintetsu Buffaloes	2.49
1980	Hiromu Matsuoka	Yakult Swallows	2.35	Isamu Kida	Nippon Ham Fighters	2.28
1981	Suguru Egawa	Yomiuri Giants	2.29	Noriaki Okabe	Nippon Ham Fighters	2.70
1982	Akio Saito	Taiyo Whales	2.07	Satoshi Takahashi	Nippon Ham Fighters	1.84
1983	Osamu Fukuma	Hanshin Tigers	2.62	Osamu Higashio	Seibu Lions	2.92
1984	Seiji Kobayashi	Hiroshima Toyo Carp	2.20	Yutaro Imai	Hankyu Braves	2.93
1985	Tatsuo Komatsu	Chunichi Dragons	2.65	Kimiyasu Kudō	Seibu Lions	2.76
1986	Manabu Kitabeppu	Hiroshima Toyo Carp	2.43	Yoshinori Sato	Hankyu Braves	2.83
1987	Masumi Kuwata	Yomiuri Giants	2.17	Kimiyasu Kudoh	Seibu Lions	2.41
1988	Yutaka Ohno	Hiroshima Toyo Carp	1.70	Hirofumi Kono	Nippon Ham Fighters	2.38
1989	Masaki Saito	Yomiuri Giants	1.62	Choji Murata	Lotte Orions	2.50
1990	Masaki Saito	Yomiuri Giants	2.17	Hideo Nomo	Kintetsu Buffaloes	2.91
1991	Shinji Sasaoka	Hiroshima Toyo Carp	2.44	Tomio Watanabe	Seibu Lions	2.35
1992	Koki Morita	Taiyo Whales	2.05	Motoyuki Akahori	Kintetsu Buffaloes	1.80
1993	Masahiro Yamamoto	Chunichi Dragons	2.05	Kimiyasu Kudō	Seibu Lions	2.06
1994	Genji Kaku	Chunichi Dragons	2.45	Hiroshi Shintani	Seibu Lions	2.91
1995	Terry Bross	Yakult Swallows	2.33	Hideki Irabu	Chiba Lotte Marines	2.53
1996	Masaki Saito	Yomiuri Giants	2.36	Hideki Irabu	Chiba Lotte Marines	2.40
1997	Yutaka Ohno	Hiroshima Toyo Carp	2.85	Satoru Komiyama	Chiba Lotte Marines	2.49
1998	Shigeki Noguchi	Chunichi Dragons	2.34	Satoru Kanemura	Nippon Ham Fighters	2.73
1999	Koji Uehara	Yomiuri Giants	2.09	Kimiyasu Kudō	Fukuoka Daiei Hawks	2.38
2000	Kazuhisa Ishii	Yakult Swallows	2.61	Nobuyuki Ebisu	Orix BlueWave	3.27
2001	Shigeki Noguchi	Chunichi Dragons	2.46	Nate Minchey	Chiba Lotte Marines	3.26
2002	Masumi Kuwata	Yomiuri Giants	2.22	Masahiko Kaneda	Orix BlueWave	2.50
2003	Kei Igawa	Hanshin Tigers	2.80	Kazumi Saito	Fukuoka Daiei Hawks	2.83
2003	Kei Igawa	Hanshin Tigers	2.80	Daisuke Matsuzaka	Seibu Lions	2.83
2004	Koji Uehara	Yomiuri Giants	2.60	Daisuke Matsuzaka	Seibu Lions	2.90
2005	Daisuke Miura	Yokohama BayStars	2.52	Toshiya Sugiuchi	Fukuoka SoftBank Hawks	2.11
2006	Hiroki Kuroda	Hiroshima Toyo Carp	1.85	Kazumi Saito	Fukuoka SoftBank Hawks	1.75
2007	Hisanori Takahashi	Yomiuri Giants	2.75	Yoshihisa Naruse	Chiba Lotte Marines	1.82
2008	Masanori Ishikawa	Tokyo Yakult Swallows	2.68	Hisashi Iwakuma	Tohoku Rakuten Golden Eagles	1.87
2009	Chen Wei-Yin	Chunichi Dragons	1.54	Yu Darvish	Hokkaido Nippon-Ham Fighters	1.73
2010	Kenta Maeda	Hiroshima Toyo Carp	2.21	Yu Darvish	Hokkaido Nippon-Ham Fighters	1.78
2011	Kazuki Yoshimi	Chunichi Dragons	1.65	Masahiro Tanaka	Tohoku Rakuten Golden Eagles	1.27
2012	Kenta Maeda	Hiroshima Toyo Carp	1.53	Mitsuo Yoshikawa	Hokkaido Nippon-Ham Fighters	1.71
2013	Kenta Maeda	Hiroshima Toyo Carp	2.10	Masahiro Tanaka	Tohoku Rakuten Golden Eagles	1.27
2014	Tomoyuki Sugano	Yomiuri Giants	2.33	Chihiro Kaneko	Orix Buffaloes	1.98
2015	Kris Johnson	Hiroshima Toyo Carp	1.85	Shohei Ohtani	Hokkaido Nippon-Ham Fighters	2.24
2016	Tomoyuki Sugano	Yomiuri Giants	2.01	Ayumu Ishikawa	Chiba Lotte Marines	2.16
2017	Tomoyuki Sugano	Yomiuri Giants	1.59	Yusei Kikuchi	Saitama Seibu Lions	1.97
2018	Tomoyuki Sugano	Yomiuri Giants	2.14	Takayuki Kishi	Tohoku Rakuten Golden Eagles	2.72
2019	Yūdai Ōno	Chunichi Dragons	2.58	Yoshinobu Yamamoto	Orix Buffaloes	1.95
2020	Yūdai Ōno	Chunichi Dragons	1.82	Kodai Senga	Fukuoka SoftBank Hawks	2.16
2021	Yūya Yanagi	Chunichi Dragons	2.20	Yoshinobu Yamamoto	Orix Buffaloes	1.39
2022	Kōyō Aoyagi	Hanshin Tigers	2.05	Yoshinobu Yamamoto	Orix Buffaloes	1.68
2023	Shoki Murakami	Hanshin Tigers	1.75	Yoshinobu Yamamoto	Orix Buffaloes	1.21
2024	Hiroto Takahashi	Chunichi Dragons	1.38	Liván Moinelo	Fukuoka SoftBank Hawks	1.88
2025	Hiroto Saiki	Hanshin Tigers	1.55	Liván Moinelo	Fukuoka SoftBank Hawks	1.46

== See also ==
- List of top Nippon Professional Baseball strikeout pitchers
- Nippon Professional Baseball#Awards
- Baseball awards#Japan
