= Shinji Sasaoka =

Japanese baseball player, coach, and manager

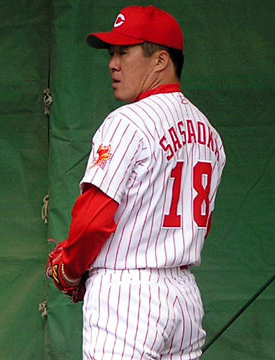
- Pitcher / Coach / Manager
- Born: August 26, 1967 (age 58); Naka District, Shimane, Japan
- Batted: Right Threw: Right

NPB debut
- April 12, 1990, for the Hiroshima Toyo Carp

Last NPB appearance
- October 7, 2007, for the Hiroshima Toyo Carp

NPB statistics (through 2007)
- Win–loss record: 138-153
- Saves: 106
- ERA: 3.58
- Strikeouts: 1806
- Stats at Baseball Reference

Teams
- As player: Hiroshima Toyo Carp (1990–2007); As coach: Hiroshima Toyo Carp (2015–2019); As Manager: Hiroshima Toyo Carp (2020–2022)

Career highlights and awards
- 1991 Central League MVP; 1991 Eiji Sawamura Award; 1991 NPB Win Champion; 1991 NPB ERA Champion; 1991 NPB MVP for Pitcher; 1991 NPB Best Nine Award; 6x NPB All-Star (1990, 1991, 1996, 1999, 2000, 2001)
- Last updated on: 8 January 2014

Shinji Sasaoka (佐々岡 真司, born August 26, 1967, in Naka District, Shimane, Japan) is a former Nippon Professional Baseball pitcher and manager.
