= Asahi, Shimane =

Dissolved municipality in Shimane prefecture, Japan

Asahi (旭町, Asahi-chō) was a town located in Naka District, Shimane Prefecture, Japan.

As of 2003, the town had an estimated population of 3,076 and a density of 23.92 persons per km^{2}. The total area was 128.57 km^{2}.

On October 1, 2005, Asahi, along with the towns of Kanagi and Misumi, and the village of Yasaka (all from Naka District), was merged into the expanded city of Hamada.
