= 1992 Nippon Professional Baseball season =

1992 NPB season
- League: Nippon Professional Baseball
- Sport: Baseball

Regular season
- Season MVP: CL: Jack Howell (YAK); PL: Takehiro Ishii (SEI)

League postseason
- CL champions: Yakult Swallows
- CL runners-up: Yomiuri Giants
- PL champions: Seibu Lions
- PL runners-up: Kintetsu Buffaloes

Japan Series
- Champions: Seibu Lions
- Runners-up: Yakult Swallows
- Finals MVP: Takehiro Ishii (SEI)

NPB seasons
- ← 1991 1993 →

The 1992 Nippon Professional Baseball season was the 43rd season of operation for the league.

== Regular season standings ==
=== Central League ===
| Central League | G | W | L | T | Pct. | GB |
|---|---|---|---|---|---|---|
| Yakult Swallows | 131 | 69 | 61 | 1 | .531 | -- |
| Yomiuri Giants | 130 | 67 | 63 | 0 | .515 | 2.0 |
| Hanshin Tigers | 132 | 67 | 63 | 2 | .515 | 2.0 |
| Hiroshima Toyo Carp | 130 | 66 | 64 | 0 | .508 | 3.0 |
| Yokohama Taiyo Whales | 131 | 61 | 69 | 1 | .469 | 8.0 |
| Chunichi Dragons | 130 | 60 | 70 | 0 | .462 | 9.0 |

=== Pacific League ===
| Pacific League | G | W | L | T | Pct. | GB |
|---|---|---|---|---|---|---|
| Seibu Lions | 130 | 80 | 47 | 3 | .630 | -- |
| Kintetsu Buffaloes | 130 | 74 | 50 | 6 | .597 | 4.5 |
| Orix BlueWave | 130 | 61 | 64 | 5 | .488 | 18.0 |
| Fukuoka Daiei Hawks | 130 | 57 | 72 | 1 | .442 | 24.0 |
| Nippon-Ham Fighters | 130 | 54 | 73 | 3 | .425 | 26.0 |
| Chiba Lotte Marines | 130 | 54 | 74 | 2 | .422 | 26.5 |

== Japan Series ==
PL Seibu Lions (4) vs. CL Yakult Swallows (3)

| Game | Date | Score | Location | Time | Attendance |
|---|---|---|---|---|---|
| 1 | October 17 | Seibu Lions – 3, Yakult Swallows – 7 | Meiji Jingu Stadium | 4:04 | 34,767 |
| 2 | October 18 | Seibu Lions – 2, Yakult Swallows – 0 | Meiji Jingu Stadium | 3:21 | 35,876 |
| 3 | October 21 | Yakult Swallows – 1, Seibu Lions – 6 | Seibu Lions Stadium | 3:24 | 31,370 |
| 4 | October 22 | Yakult Swallows – 0, Seibu Lions – 1 | Seibu Lions Stadium | 2:38 | 31,457 |
| 5 | October 23 | Yakult Swallows – 7, Seibu Lions – 6 | Seibu Lions Stadium | 3:53 | 31,489 |
| 6 | October 25 | Seibu Lions – 7, Yakult Swallows – 8 | Meiji Jingu Stadium | 4:10 | 35,391 |
| 7 | October 26 | Seibu Lions – 2, Yakult Swallows – 1 | Meiji Jingu Stadium | 4:05 | 34,101 |

== See also ==
- 1992 Major League Baseball season
