= Masahiko Kaneda =

Japanese baseball player (born 1969)

- Pitcher
- Born: April 30, 1969 (age 57); Bungotakada, Ōita, Japan
- Batted: Left Threw: Left

NPB debut
- April 11, 1993, for the Orix BlueWave

Last NPB appearance
- May 6, 2006, for the Tohoku Rakuten Golden Eagles

NPB statistics
- Win–loss record: 52–65
- Earned run average: 4.16
- Strikeouts: 638
- Saves: 1
- Stats at Baseball Reference

Teams
- Orix BlueWave (1993–2004); Tohoku Rakuten Golden Eagles (2005–2006)

Career highlights and awards
- 1× Japan Series champion (1996); 2× NPB All-Star (1999, 2002); 1× Pacific League ERA Champion (2002)

Masahiko Kaneda (金田 政彦, Kaneda Masahiko; born April 30, 1969) is a former professional baseball player from Bungotakada, Ōita, Japan.
