= Yoshinori Sato (baseball, born 1954) =

Japanese baseball player and coach

Sato Yoshinori 佐藤 義則
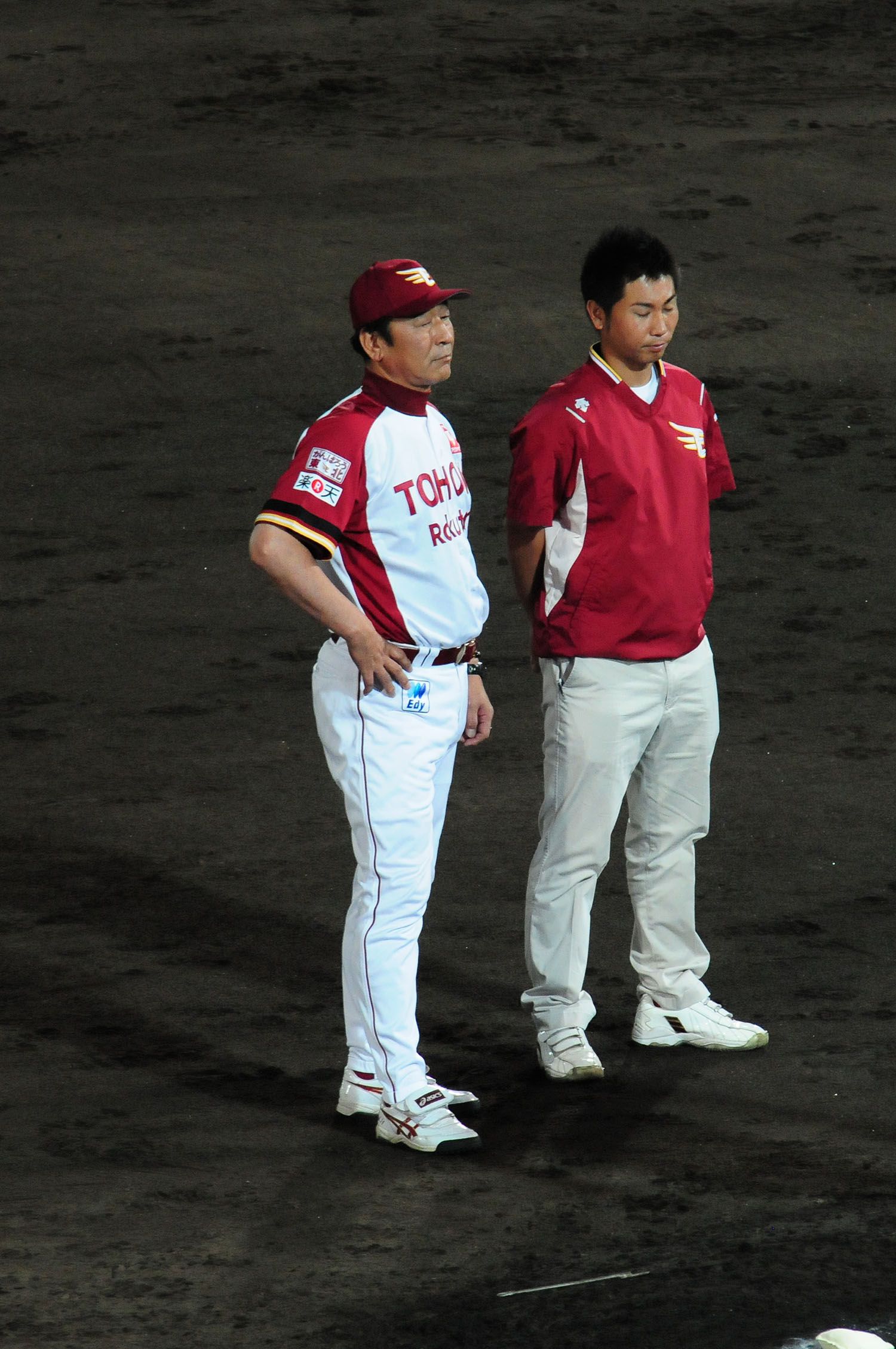
- Sato with the Tohoku Rakuten Golden Eagles
- Pitcher / Coach
- Born: September 11, 1954 (age 71); Okushiri District, Hokkaido, Japan
- Batted: Right Threw: Right

NPB debut
- May 11, 1977, for the Hankyu Braves

Last NPB appearance
- October 1, 1998, for the Orix BlueWave

NPB statistics
- Win–loss record: 165-137
- Saves: 48
- ERA: 3.97
- Strikeouts: 1755
- Stats at Baseball Reference

Teams
- As player: Hankyu Braves/Orix Braves/Orix BlueWave (1977–1998); As coach: Orix BlueWave (1999–2000); Hanshin Tigers (2002–2004); Hokkaido Nippon-Ham Fighters (2005–2007); Tohoku Rakuten Golden Eagles (2009–2014); Fukuoka SoftBank Hawks (2015–2017); Tohoku Rakuten Golden Eagles (2018–2019)

Career highlights and awards
- 3x Japan Series champion (1977, 1996, 2013); 1977 Pacific League Rookie of the Year; 1x NPB Win Champion (1985); 1x NPB ERA Champion (1986); 2x NPB Strikeout Champion (1984, 1985); 7x NPB All-Star (1978, 1984, 1985, 1988, 1989, 1993, 1994)
- Last updated on: 8 February 2014

Yoshinori Sato (佐藤 義則, born September 11, 1954, in Okushiri District, Hokkaido, Japan) is a former Nippon Professional Baseball pitcher.
