= Misumi, Shimane =

Dissolved municipality in Shimane prefecture, Japan

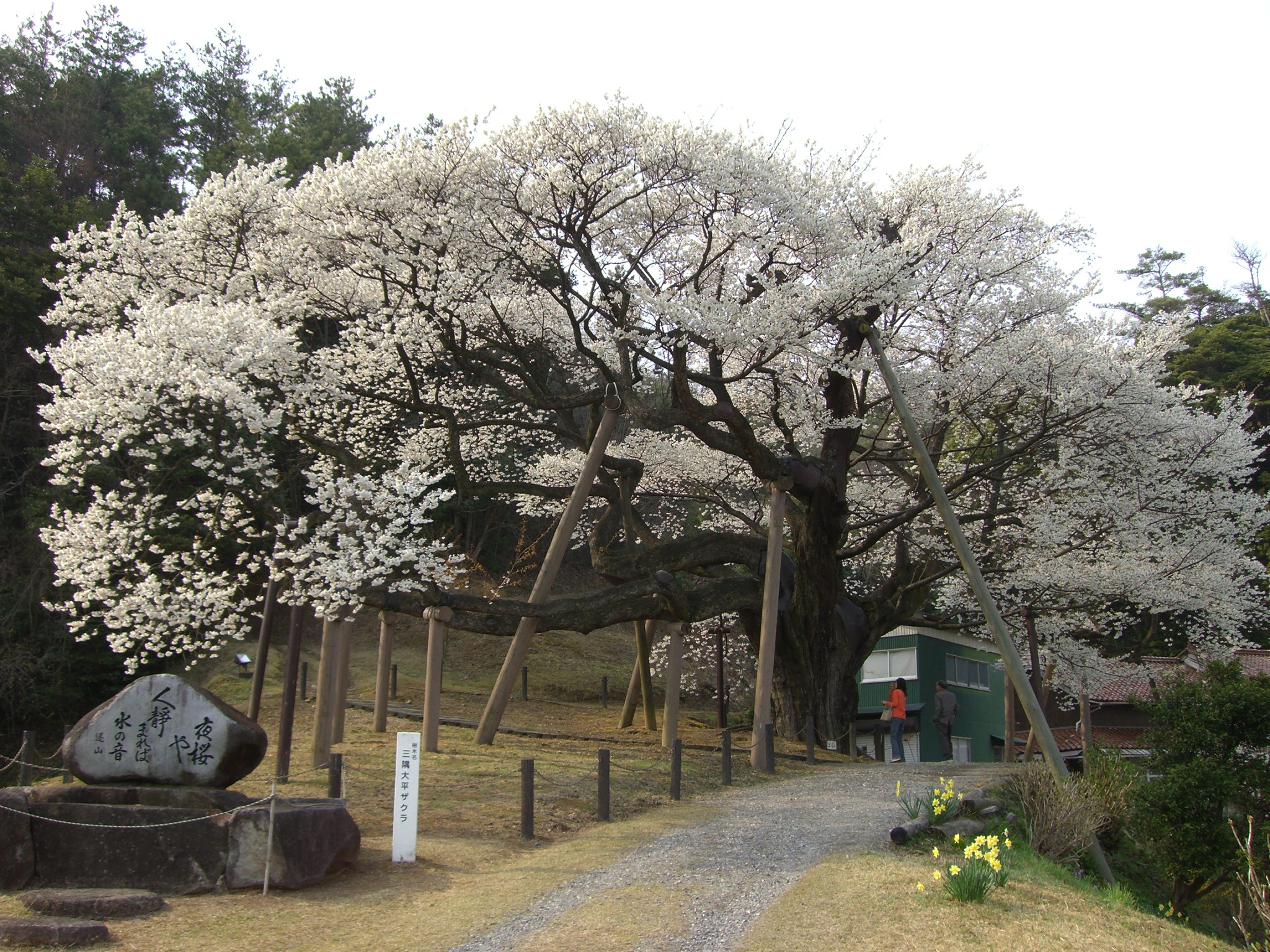
Obira

Misumi (三隅町, Misumi-chō) was a town located in Naka District, Shimane Prefecture, Japan.

As of 2003, the town had an estimated population of 7,758 and a density of 60.35 persons per km^{2}. The total area was 128.55 km^{2}.

On October 1, 2005, Misumi, along with the towns of Asahi and Kanagi, and the village of Yasaka (all from Naka District), was merged into the expanded city of Hamada.

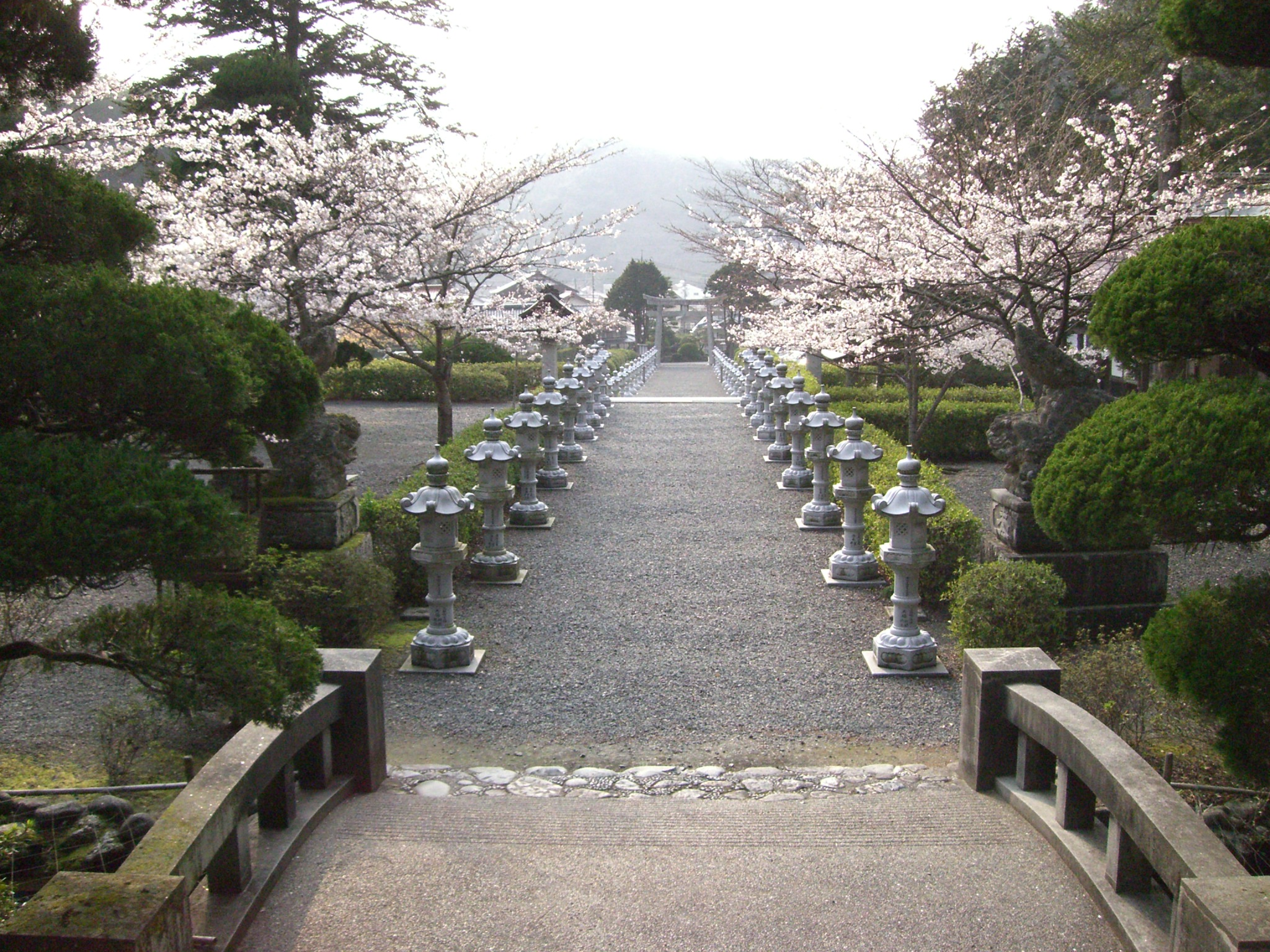

Misumi is located between the towns of Hamada and Masuda on Route 9 which runs along the coast of Japan. Bordered by the Sea of Japan, Misumi is renowned for an estimated 600-year-old Obira sakura tree approximately seven kilometers outside of town. The tree blossoms every year at the beginning of April and draws visitors from all over Japan.

Several temples highlight the downtown area. Ryūun-ji temple, further along the road from Misumi Shrine up into the mountain, is also a major tourist destination in Misumi.

Aqua Misumi features an Olympic-sized pool, workout area and gymnasium. Sekisho Art Museum is located near Aqua Misumi, both about two kilometers off of Route 9.

== Gallery ==
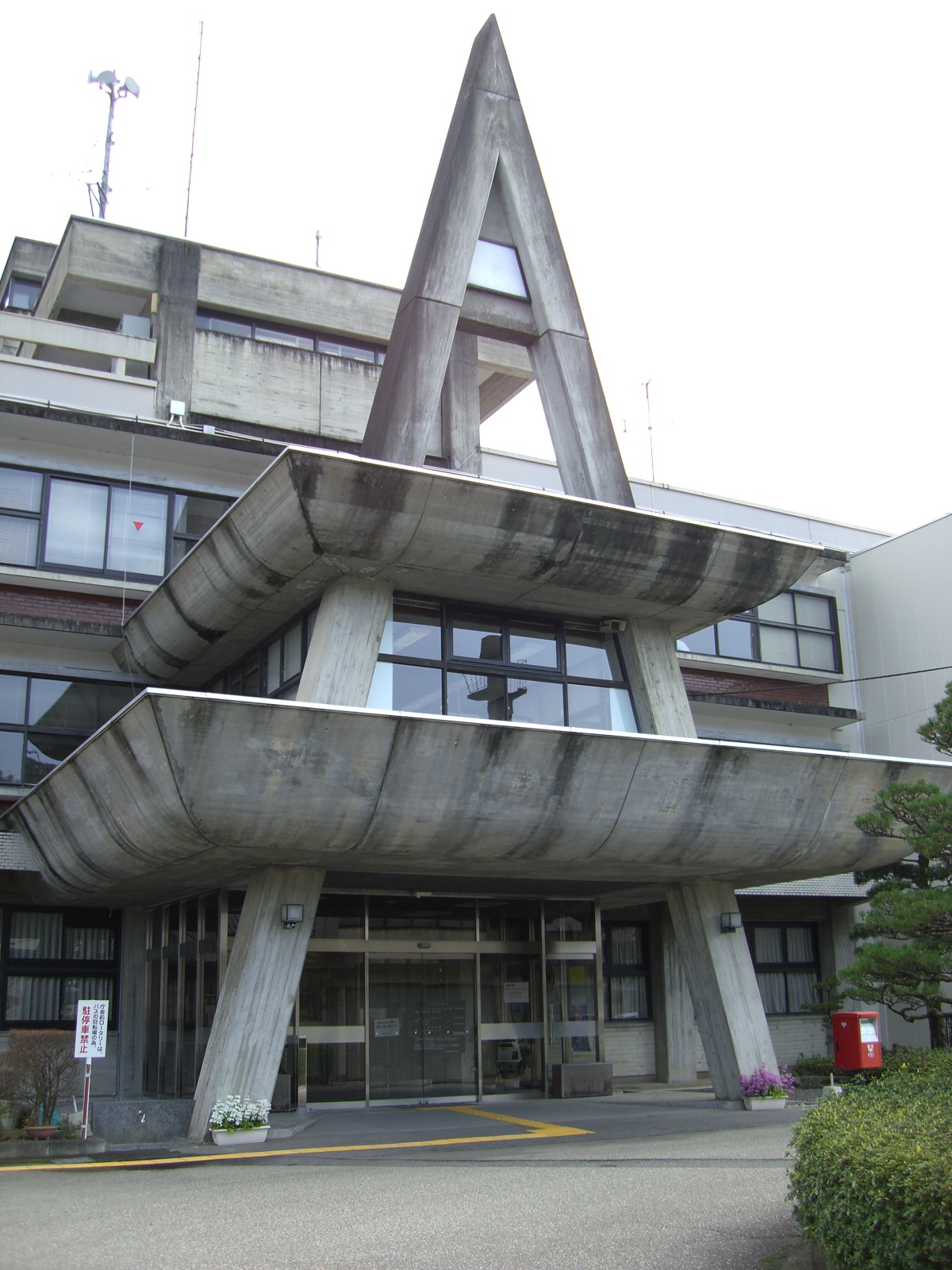
Misumi Board of Education

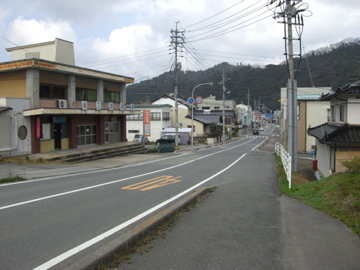
A look at downtown Misumi.

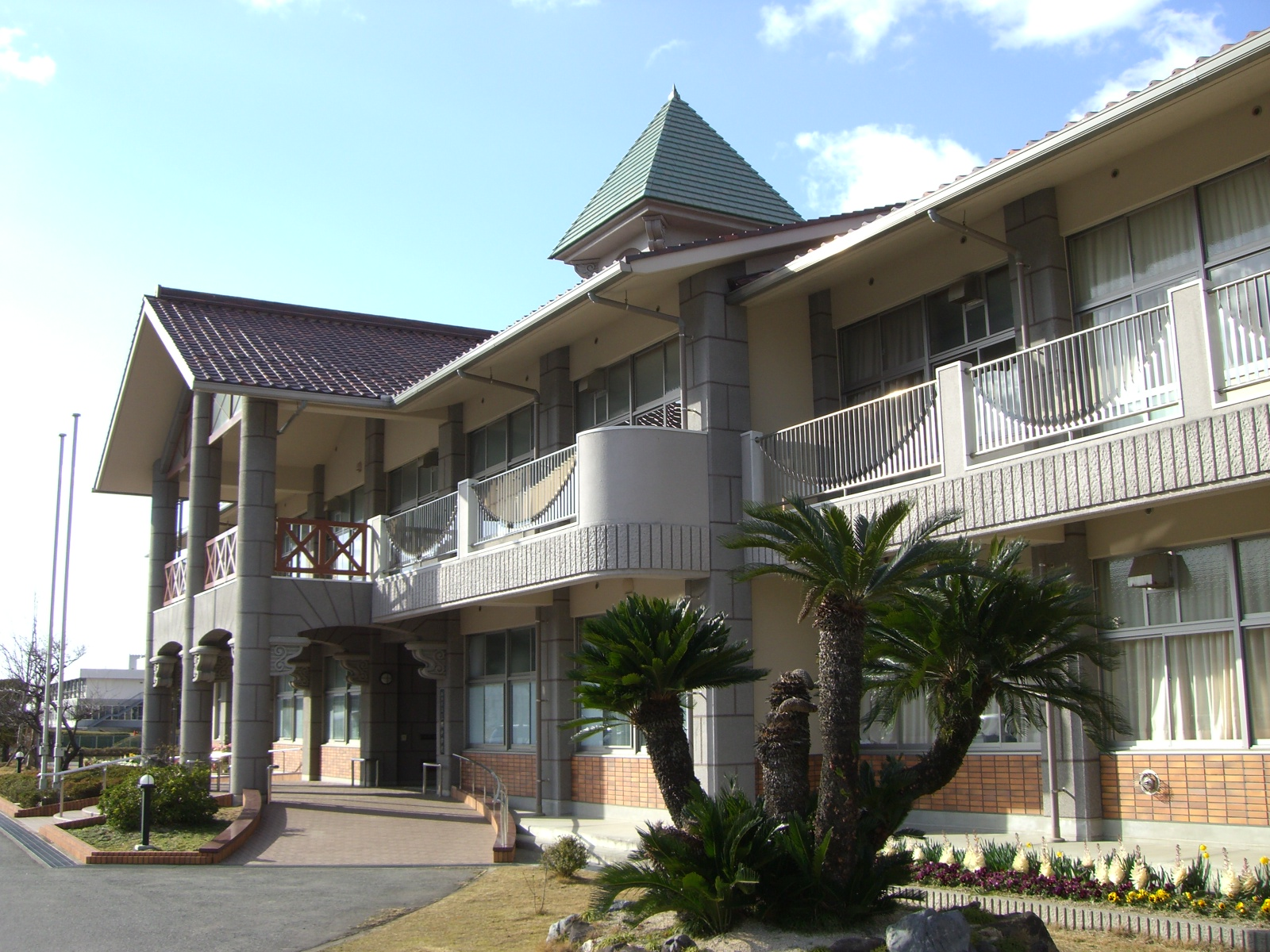
Misumi Junior High School

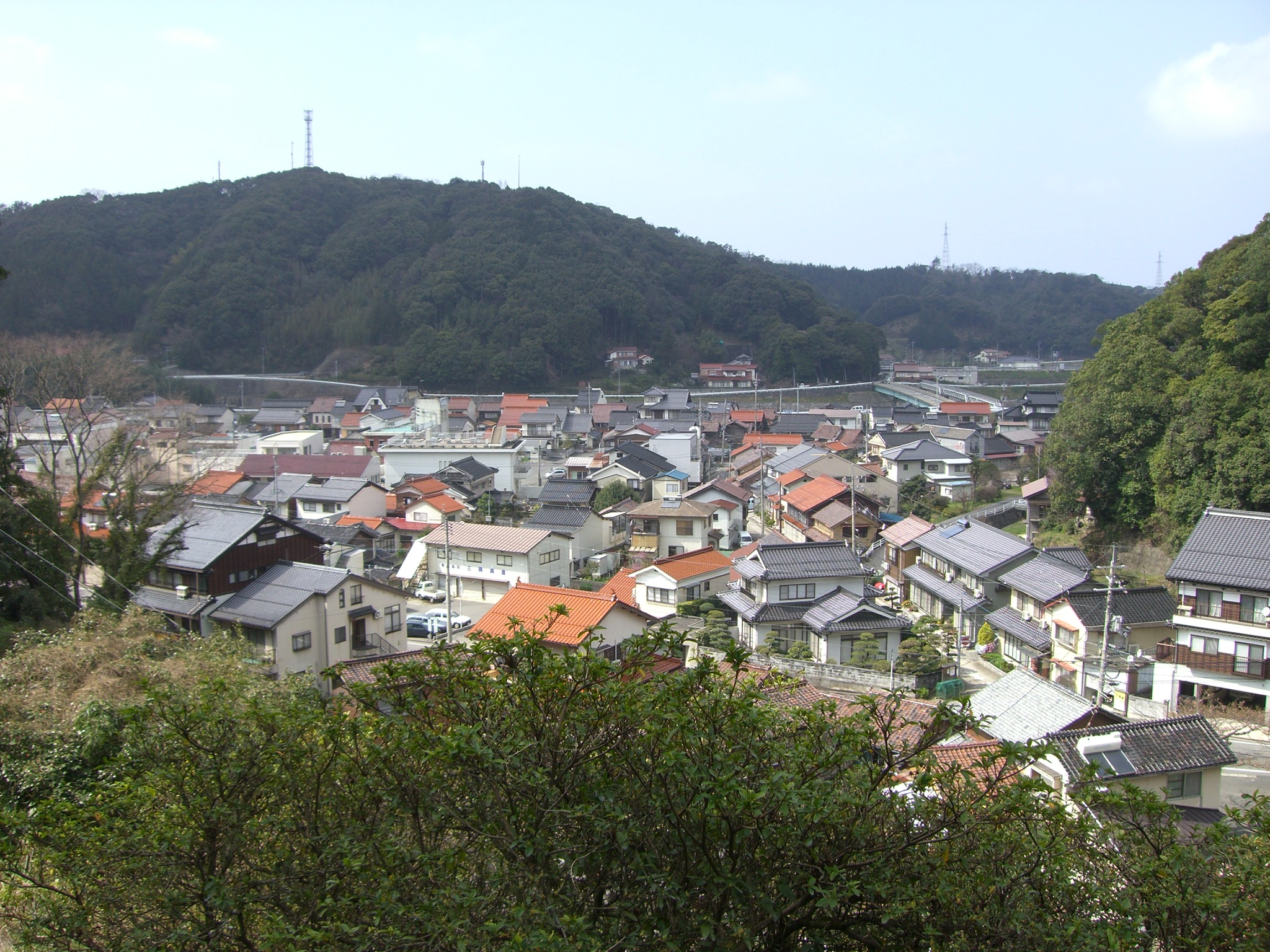
Misumi from above
