= 1987 European Baseball Championship =

Tournament details
- Country: Spain
- Dates: 17–26 July
- Teams: 7
- Defending champions: Netherlands

Final positions
- Champions: Netherlands (13th title)
- Runners-up: Italy
- Third place: Spain
- Fourth place: Belgium

Tournament statistics
- Games played: 29

Awards
- MVP: (Netherlands) Rikkert Faneyte

The 1987 European Baseball Championship was held in Barcelona and Sant Boi, Spain. The Netherlands won its second consecutive championship, which qualified the team for the 1988 Summer Olympics. Italy finished as runner-up.

Rikkert Faneyte, who would later play in Major League Baseball, was the tournament MVP. Future National League Manager of the Year Pat Murphy managed the Dutch team. He left immediately after the tournament to coach the Notre Dame Fighting Irish.

== Format ==
The seven teams were split into two groups that played a round-robin tournament. The top two teams of each group, the Netherlans, Italy, Spain, and Belgium, competed in another round-robin tournament, as did the remaining three teams. The top two teams from the second round competed in a championship series, which the Netherlands won after winning two games, with their win over Italy in the second round counting toward a 3–2 victory. The Netherlands blew out Italy in the decisive game, 16–1. Spain bested Belgium in a third-place series, again winning three games to two, with the second round win counting.

== Standings ==
| Pos. | Team | Record |
|---|---|---|
| 1 | Netherlands | 7–2 |
| 2 | Italy | 5–3 |
| 3 | Spain | 5–4 |
| 4 | Belgium | 3–5 |
| 5 | Sweden | 3–3 |
| 6 | France | 2–4 |
| 7 | Germany | 1–5 |

== Awards ==
- Most valuable player: (Netherlands) Rikkert Faneyte
- Best hitter: (Netherlands) Marcel Kruyt
- Best pitcher: (Spain) Pedro Valarezo
