= Nobuyuki Ebisu =

Japanese baseball player

- Pitcher
- Born: April 24, 1972; Kobe, Hyōgo
- Batted: Right Threw: Right

NPB debut
- September 21, 1994, for the Orix BlueWave

Last appearance
- April 24, 2003, for the Yakult Swallows

NPB statistics (through 2004)
- Win–loss record: 15-16
- Earned run average: 4.04
- Strikeouts: 192

Teams
- Orix BlueWave (1991–2002); Yakult Swallows (2002–2003); Osaka Kintetsu Buffaloes (2004)

Career highlights and awards
- 1× NPB All-Star (2000); 1× NPB ERA champion (2000)

Nobuyuki Ebisu (戎 信行, Ebisu Nobuyuki) is a former baseball player in Japan. He primarily played for the Orix BlueWave in the Pacific League He attended Spring Training with the Seattle Mariners.
