= Baseball at the 1988 Summer Olympics =

Demonstration sport

Tournament details
- Country: South Korea
- City: Seoul
- Dates: September 19–28, 1988
- Teams: 8

Final positions
- Champions: United States (1st title)
- Runners-up: Japan
- Third place: Puerto Rico
- Fourth place: South Korea

Tournament statistics
- Games played: 16

Baseball at the 1988 Summer Olympics was a demonstration sport for the seventh time. It would become an official sport four years later at the 1992 Summer Olympics. Eight teams competed in Jamsil Baseball Stadium in the baseball tournament. The format used was the same as the tournament of four years earlier. Five teams that competed in the 1984 tournament returned. Cuba originally qualified but withdrew as a result of the boycott.

== Teams ==
- Australia (Invited to replace Cuba. Nicaragua, Mexico and Italy had senior rights, but could not send teams at short notice)
- Canada (1987 Pan American Games fourth place, defeated 1987 European Baseball Championship silver medalist Italy in a playoff)
- Chinese Taipei (1987 Asian Baseball Championship gold medalist)
- Japan (1984 Summer Olympics gold medalist)
- Netherlands (1987 European Baseball Championship gold medalist)
- Puerto Rico (1987 Pan American Games bronze medalist)
- South Korea (Hosts)
- United States (1987 Pan American Games silver medalist)

== Preliminary round ==
There were two pools for the preliminary round. Teams played each of the three other teams in their division.

=== Blue Division ===
Pos	Team	Pld	W	L	RF	RA	RD	PCT	GB	Qualification
1	Japan	3	3	0	17	5	+12	1.000	—	Advance to knockout round
2	Puerto Rico	3	2	1	10	11	−1	.667	1	Advance to knockout round
3	Netherlands	3	1	2	11	14	−3	.333	2	
4	Chinese Taipei	3	0	3	4	12	−8	.000	3	

20 September; Game 1	Netherlands	6–1	Chinese Taipei	Jamsil Baseball Stadium

20 September; Game 6	Puerto Rico	1–7	Japan	Jamsil Baseball Stadium

22 September; Game 2	Chinese Taipei	3–4 (F/12)	Japan	Jamsil Baseball Stadium

22 September; Game 5	Puerto Rico	7–4	Netherlands	Jamsil Baseball Stadium

24 September; Game 3	Chinese Taipei	0–2	Puerto Rico	Jamsil Baseball Stadium

24 September; Game 4	Japan	6–1	Netherlands	Jamsil Baseball Stadium

=== White Division ===
Pos	Team	Pld	W	L	RF	RA	RD	PCT	GB	Qualification
1	United States	3	2	1	24	13	+11	.667	—	Advance to knockout round
2	South Korea	3	2	1	10	9	+1	.667	—	Advance to knockout round
3	Australia	3	1	2	10	20	−10	.333	1	
4	Canada	3	1	2	17	19	−2	.333	1	

19 September; Game 1	Canada	6–7	Australia	Jamsil Baseball Stadium

19 September; Game 6	United States	5–3	South Korea	Jamsil Baseball Stadium

23 September; Game 2	Australia	1–2 (F/10)	South Korea	Jamsil Baseball Stadium

23 September; Game 5	United States	7–8	Canada	Jamsil Baseball Stadium

25 September; Game 3	Australia	2–12 (F/7)	United States	Jamsil Baseball Stadium

25 September; Game 4	South Korea	5–3	Canada	Jamsil Baseball Stadium

== Knockout round ==
Semi-finals
26 September
Japan	3
South Korea	1
26 September
Puerto Rico	2
United States	7

Final
28 September
Japan	3
United States	5
Third place
28 September
South Korea	0
Puerto Rico	7

=== Semifinals ===
The semifinals pitted the first-place team of each division against the second-place team of the other division. Thus, Japan (3–0) played against South Korea (2–1), which had a tied record with the United States (2–1) but had lost in head-to-head competition against them. The first-place Americans played against Puerto Rico (2–1).

26 September; Game 1	South Korea	1–3	Japan	Jamsil Baseball Stadium

26 September; Game 2	Puerto Rico	2–7	United States	Jamsil Baseball Stadium

=== Third-place final ===
The third-place final pitted the losers of the semifinals against each, with the winner taking third place and the loser taking fourth.

28 September	Puerto Rico	7–0	South Korea	Jamsil Baseball Stadium

=== First-place final ===
The winners of the semifinals played each other for first and second place. In a rematch of the 1984 final, the reigning champion Japanese team lost to the United States. Since baseball was a demonstration sport, no official medals were awarded.

28 September	United States	5–3	Japan	Jamsil Baseball Stadium

== Rosters ==
=== Australia ===
- Anthony Adamson
- Barrie Bahnert
- David Buckthorpe
- Scott Cameron
- David Clarkson
- Jon Deeble
- Malcolm Gregg
- Shaun Harbar
- Gregory Harvey
- Kim Jessop
- Geoffrey Martin
- Parris Mitchell
- Michael Nind
- Matthew Sheldon-Collins
- Peter Hartas
- Tony Thomson
- Peter Vogler
- Grant Weir
- Darren Welch
- Peter Wood

=== Canada ===
- Rob Butler
- Bill Byckowski
- Rheal Cormier
- Randy Curran
- Gregory Duce
- Marc Griffin
- Stewart Hillman
- Peter Hoy
- Lome Franklin Humber
- Rick Johnston
- James Kotkas
- Alan Mauthe
- Thomas Nelson
- Greg O'Halloran
- Barry Parisotto
- Greg Roth
- David Rypien
- Warren Sawkiw
- Matt Stairs
- Dave Wainhouse

=== Chinese Taipei ===
- Chin-Mou Chen
- Yi-Hsin Chen
- Tai-Chuan Chiang
- Cheng-Chin Hong
- I-Chung Hong
- Chiung-Lung Huang
- Ping-Yang Huang
- Cheng-Cherng Kuo
- Kuo Lee Chien-Fu
- Chu-Ming Lee
- I-Tseng Lin
- Lin Chung-chiu
- Lo Chen-Jung
- Lo Kuo-Chong
- Chi-Chen Tseng
- Hung-Chin Tu
- Kuang-Huei Wang
- Fu-Lien Wu
- Shih-Hsin Wu
- Chieh-Jen Yang

=== Japan ===
- 1 Masafumi Nishi, IF
- 2 Hiroki Katsuragi, IF
- 3 Kunji Yonezaki, IF
- 6 Kenjiro Nomura, IF
- 8 Terushi Nakajima, OF
- 9 Hirofumi Ogawa, IF
- 10 Daisuke Tsutsui, IF
- 11 Tetsuya Shiozaki, P
- 12 Tomio Watanabe, P
- 14 Tetsu Suzuki, P
- 15 So Kikuchi, P
- 16 Shuji Yoshida, P
- 18 Takehiro Ishii, P
- 19 Hideo Nomo, P
- 20 Atsuya Furuta, C
- 21 Makoto Maeda, OF
- 22 Atsuyoshi Otake, C
- 25 Yasushi Matsumoto, OF
- 27 Kenji Tomashino, OF
- 28 Takeshi Omori, IF
- 30 Yoshinobu Suzuki, head coach
- 31 Katsuji Kawashima, assistant coach
- 32 Masatake Nakayama], assistant coach

=== The Netherlands ===
- Frank Bos
- Eric de Bruin
- Peter Callenbach
- Robert Eenhoorn
- Rikkert Faneyte
- Ron Giroldi
- Bill Groot
- Gerlach Halderman
- Jacky Jakoba
- Marcel Joost
- Robert Knol
- Frank Koot
- Harry Koster
- Marcel Kruyt
- Alfred de Leeuw
- Hans van Renselaar
- Ronald Stoovelaar
- Bart Volkerijk
- Eric de Vries
- Haitze de Vries

=== Puerto Rico ===
- Albert Bracero
- Elliot Cianchini
- Luis O. Davila
- Jesus I. Feliciano
- James C. Figueroa
- Anthony Garcia
- Efrain Garcia
- Eddie Horrio
- Jose Lorenzana
- Victor L. Martinez
- Roberto Mateo
- Jose V. Melendez
- Angel A. Morales
- Benedicto Poupart
- Mariano Quinones
- Luis Ramos
- Jorge Robles
- Abimael Rosario
- Roberto Santana
- Wilfredo Velez

=== South Korea ===
- Baek Jae-woo
- Chang Ho-ick
- Cho Kye-yun
- Choi Hae-myoung
- Choi Hoo-jae
- Hwang Dae-yeon
- Kang Ki-woong
- Kang Young-soo
- Kim Dong-soo
- Kim Ki-bum
- Kim Kyung-ki
- Kim Tae-hyoung
- Kwon Taek-jae
- Lee Kang-chul
- Lee Kwang-woo
- Lee Suk-jae
- Park Dong-hee
- Roh Chan-yup
- Song Gu-hong
- Song Jin-woo

=== United States ===
- Jim Abbott, P
- Bret Barberie, IF
- Andy Benes, P
- Jeff Branson, IF
- Mike Fiore, OF
- Tom Goodwin, OF
- Ty Griffin, IF
- Tino Martinez, IF
- Bill Masse, OF
- Ben McDonald, P
- Mike Milchin, IF/P
- Mickey Morandini, OF
- Charles Nagy, P
- Doug Robbins, C
- Scott Servais, C
- Dave Silvestri, IF
- Joe Slusarski, P
- Ed Sprague, IF
- Robin Ventura, IF
- Ted Wood, OF
- Mark Marquess, head coach
- Skip Bertman, assistant coach
- Dave Bingham, assistant coach
- Ron Polk, assistant coach

== Final standings ==
Place	Team
Gold	United States
Silver	Japan
Bronze	Puerto Rico
4	South Korea
5	Netherlands
6	Australia
7	Canada
8	Chinese Taipei

1988 Olympic champions

United States
Demonstration Sport title
