= Yoshitaka Katori =

Japanese baseball player and coach

- Pitcher
- Born: March 10, 1957 (age 69); Kami, Kōchi, Japan
- Batted: Right Threw: Right

NPB debut
- April 7, 1979, for the Yomiuri Giants

Last NPB appearance
- October 5, 1997, for the Seibu Lions

NPB statistics (through 1997)
- Win–loss record: 91-46
- Saves: 131
- ERA: 2.76
- Strikeouts: 846
- Stats at Baseball Reference

Teams
- As player: Yomiuri Giants (1979–1989); Seibu Lions (1990–1997); As coach: Yomiuri Giants (1998–2000, 2002–2003)

Career highlights and awards
- 3× NPB All-Star (1987, 1991, 1993)
- Last updated on: 11 February 2014

Yoshitaka Katori (鹿取 義隆, Katori Yoshitaka; born March 10, 1957 in Kami, Kōchi, Japan) is a former Nippon Professional Baseball pitcher.
