= Yutaka Ohno =

Japanese baseball player (born 1955)

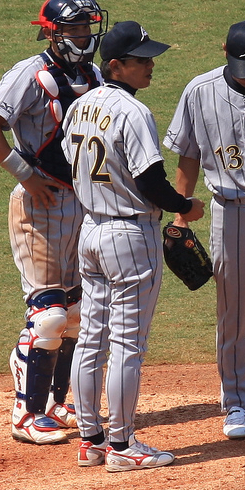
- Ohno as pitching coach for Japan in the 2008 Summer Olympics.
- Pitcher / Coach
- Born: August 30, 1955 (age 70); Izumo, Shimane, Japan
- Batted: Left Threw: Left

NPB debut
- September 4, 1977, for the Hiroshima Toyo Carp

Last NPB appearance
- September 27, 1998, for the Hiroshima Toyo Carp

NPB statistics
- Win–loss record: 148–100
- Saves: 138
- Earned run average: 2.90
- Strikeouts: 1,733
- Stats at Baseball Reference

Teams
- As player: Hiroshima Toyo Carp (1977–1998); As coach: Hiroshima Toyo Carp (1999, 2010–2012)

Career highlights and awards
- 2x NPB ERA Champion (1988, 1997); NPB MVP for Relief pitcher (1991); 2x NPB Saves Champion (1991, 1992); Eiji Sawamura Award (1988)

Member of the Japanese

Baseball Hall of Fame
- Induction: 2013
- Last updated on: 29 August 2009

Yutaka Ohno (大野 豊, Ohno Yutaka), (born August 30, 1955) is a former Japanese baseball player of the Hiroshima Toyo Carp of Japan's Central League.

== Playing career ==
He was one of the most famous Japanese left-handed pitchers. He was born in Izumo, Shimane. He was known as the man from "Japanese-style baseball" (軟式野球, Nanshiki-Yakyū). He led his team in five Japan Series and won three titles (1979, 1980 and 1984). In 1998, he decided to retire after giving up a home run to rookie Yoshinobu Takahashi on a fastball he had thrown with absolute confidence.

== Legacy ==
- 1st pitch on September 4, 1977.
- 1st win on August 12, 1978.
- Best ERA (1988 and 1997).
- Relief Man of the Year Award winner (1991).
- Greatest Number of Saves (1991 and 1992).
- Sawamura Award winner (1988).
- 148 W, 138 S, 59 CG, 19 Shutout and 1733 K.
- Hiroshima Carp Pitching Coach (1999).
- Japan national baseball team Pitching Coach at the Athens Olympics (2003–2004).
- Japan national baseball team Pitching Coach at the Beijing Olympics (2007–2008).

== Statistics ==
Year	Team	No.	GP	W	L	S	IP	K	ERA	Titles
1977	Hiroshima	60	1	0	0	0	0.3	0	135.00	
1978	Hiroshima	57	41	3	1	0	74.3	54	3.77	
1979	Hiroshima	57	58	5	5	2	105.3	64	3.86	League Champion, Japan Series Champion
1980	Hiroshima	24	49	7	2	1	109.7	76	2.70	League Champion, Japan Series Champion
1981	Hiroshima	24	57	8	4	11	111.0	78	2.68	
1982	Hiroshima	24	57	10	7	11	106.3	82	2.63	
1983	Hiroshima	24	49	7	10	9	115.3	89	3.51	
1984	Hiroshima	24	24	10	5	2	147.0	95	2.94	League Champion, Japan Series Champion
1985	Hiroshima	24	32	10	7	2	161.7	86	4.06	
1986	Hiroshima	24	15	6	5	0	92.0	63	2.74	League Champion
1987	Hiroshima	24	25	13	5	0	159.7	145	2.93	
1988	Hiroshima	24	24	13	7	0	185.0	183	1.70	Best ERA, Sawamura Award winner
1989	Hiroshima	24	19	8	6	0	145.7	139	1.92	
1990	Hiroshima	24	27	5	11	3	125.0	118	3.17	
1991	Hiroshima	24	37	6	2	26	46.3	58	1.17	Relief Man of the Year Award winner, Greatest Number of Saves, League Champion
1992	Hiroshima	24	42	5	3	26	59.0	77	1.98	Greatest Number of Saves
1993	Hiroshima	24	31	3	1	23	38.0	46	2.37	
1994	Hiroshima	24	42	4	2	18	48.7	38	2.40	
1995	Hiroshima	24	22	7	5	4	102.7	66	3.07	
1996	Hiroshima	24	19	5	4	0	119.0	72	3.93	
1997	Hiroshima	24	23	9	6	0	135.7	80	2.85	Best ERA
1998	Hiroshima	24	13	3	2	0	43.3	24	2.91	
TOTALS		-	707	148	100	138	2231.0	1733	2.90	-

== See also ==
- Eiji Sawamura Award
- List of Nippon Professional Baseball ERA champions
