= Jack Howell (baseball) =

American baseball player (born 1961)

Tri-City Dust Devils – No. 16
- Third baseman/ Manager
- Born: August 18, 1961 (age 64); Tucson, Arizona, U.S.
- Batted: Left Threw: Right

Professional debut
- MLB: May 20, 1985, for the California Angels
- NPB: April 4, 1992, for the Yakult Swallows

Last appearance
- NPB: July 23, 1995, for the Yomiuri Giants
- MLB: July 17, 1999, for the Houston Astros

MLB statistics
- Batting average: .239
- Home runs: 108
- Runs batted in: 337

NPB statistics
- Batting average: .291
- Home runs: 100
- Runs batted in: 272
- Stats at Baseball Reference

Teams
- California Angels (1985–1991); San Diego Padres (1991); Yakult Swallows (1992–1994); Yomiuri Giants (1995); California / Anaheim Angels (1996–1997); Houston Astros (1998–1999)

Career highlights and awards
- Central League MVP (1992)

Jack Robert Howell (born August 18, 1961) is an American former professional baseball third baseman. He made his Major League Baseball (MLB) debut on May 20, 1985, with the California Angels, and played his final game on July 17, 1999, with the Houston Astros. He was previously the manager of the Tri-City Dust Devils.

== Early life ==
Howell was born and raised in Tucson, Arizona. He attended Pima Community College and then the University of Arizona, where he played baseball for the Arizona Wildcats.

== Career ==
Howell played for three different MLB teams during his professional career. He started with the California Angels where he from 1987 to 1989 averaged hitting 20 home runs per season until being traded to the San Diego Padres.

Howell next played Nippon Professional Baseball (NPB), and was a member of the Yakult Swallows (1992–1994), as well as the Yomiuri Giants (1995). He won the Central League Most Valuable Player award in 1992, when he led the league in home runs and batting average. On July 29, 1993, Howell hit for the cycle for the Swallows.

He returned to MLB as a bench player with the California Angels during the 1996 Season. He then signed on as a free agent with the Houston Astros, with whom he ended his career in 1999

Howell was the hitting coach for the Arizona Diamondbacks. He was fired by the Diamondbacks following the 2010 season. Howell was the Manager for the Burlington Bees of the Midwest League and Single-A affiliate of the Los Angeles Angels until they lost their affiliation in December 2020.
