= 1991 Nippon Professional Baseball season =

1991 NPB season
- League: Nippon Professional Baseball
- Sport: Baseball

Regular season
- Season MVP: CL: Shinji Sasaoka (HIR); PL: Taigen Kaku (SEI)

League postseason
- CL champions: Hiroshima Toyo Carp
- CL runners-up: Chunichi Dragons
- PL champions: Seibu Lions
- PL runners-up: Kintetsu Buffaloes

Japan Series
- Champions: Seibu Lions
- Runners-up: Hiroshima Toyo Carp
- Finals MVP: Koji Akiyama (SEI)

NPB seasons
- ← 1990 1992 →

The 1991 Nippon Professional Baseball season was the 42nd season of operation for the league.

== Regular season standings ==
=== Central League ===
Central League	G	W	L	T	Pct.	GB
Hiroshima Toyo Carp	132	74	56	2	.569	--
Chunichi Dragons	131	71	59	1	.546	3.0
Yakult Swallows	132	67	63	2	.515	7.0
Yomiuri Giants	130	66	64	0	.508	8.0
Yokohama Taiyo Whales	131	64	66	1	.492	10.0
Hanshin Tigers	130	48	82	0	.369	26.0

=== Pacific League ===
Pacific League	G	W	L	T	Pct.	GB
Seibu Lions	130	81	43	6	.653	--
Kintetsu Buffaloes	130	77	48	5	.616	4.5
Orix BlueWave	130	64	63	3	.504	18.5
Nippon-Ham Fighters	130	53	72	5	.424	28.5
Fukuoka Daiei Hawks	130	53	73	4	.421	29.0
Lotte Orions	130	48	77	5	.384	33.5

== Japan Series ==
PL Seibu Lions (4) vs. CL Hiroshima Toyo Carp (3)

Game	Date	Score	Location	Time	Attendance
1	October 19	Hiroshima Toyo Carp - 3, Seibu Lions – 11	Seibu Lions Stadium	2:48	31,770
2	October 20	Hiroshima Toyo Carp – 4, Seibu Lions – 2	Seibu Lions Stadium	3:11	31,903
3	October 22	Seibu Lions – 1, Hiroshima Toyo Carp – 0	Hiroshima Municipal Stadium	3:37	27,713
4	October 23	Seibu Lions – 3, Hiroshima Toyo Carp – 7	Hiroshima Municipal Stadium	3:06	28,591
5	October 24	Seibu Lions - 0, Hiroshima Toyo Carp - 3	Hiroshima Municipal Stadium	2:51	28,669
6	October 26	Hiroshima Toyo Carp - 1, Seibu Lions - 6	Seibu Lions Stadium	3:03	31,900
7	October 28	Hiroshima Toyo Carp - 1, Seibu Lions - 7	Seibu Lions Stadium	3:20	32,011

== See also ==
- 1991 Major League Baseball season
