= Tetsuya Shiozaki =

Japanese baseball player and coach

- Pitcher / Coach
- Born: November 26, 1968 (age 56); Naruto, Okinawa, Japan
- Batted: Right Threw: Right

NPB debut
- April 14, 1990, for the Seibu Lions

Last NPB appearance
- September 21, 2004, for the Seibu Lions

NPB statistics
- Win–loss record: 82–55
- Saves: 55
- Earned run average: 3.16
- Strikeouts: 967

Teams
- As player: Seibu Lions (1990–2004); As coach: Seibu Lions/Saitama Seibu Lions (2007–2011, 2013–2018)

Career highlights and awards
- NPB All-Star (1995)
Medals
Baseball
Representing Japan
Olympic Games
Silver medal – second place	1988 Seoul	Team

Tetsuya Shiozaki (潮崎 哲也, Shiozaki Tetsuya; born September 21, 1967) is a former Nippon Professional Baseball pitcher.
