= Naka District, Shimane =

Former district in Shimane prefecture, Japan

Naka (那賀郡, Naka-gun) was a district located in Shimane Prefecture, Japan.

As of 2003, the district had an estimated population of 17,618 and a density of 33.44 persons per km^{2}. The total area was 526.92 km^{2}.

== Former towns and villages ==
- Asahi
- Kanagi
- Misumi
- Yasaka

== Merger ==
- On October 1, 2005 - the towns of Asahi, Kanagi, Misumi and Yasaka were merged into the expanded city of Hamada. Naka District was dissolved as a result of this merger.
