= Takehiro Ishii =

Japanese baseball player and coach

- Pitcher / Coach
- Born: October 25, 1964 (age 61); Ota, Tokyo, Japan
- Batted: Right Threw: Right

NPB debut
- 1989, for the Seibu Lions

Last NPB appearance
- 1999, for the Nippon-Ham Fighters

NPB statistics
- Win–loss record: 68–52
- Earned run average: 3.31
- Strikeouts: 755
- Stats at Baseball Reference

Teams
- As player: Seibu Lions (1989–1997); Nippon-Ham Fighters (1998–1999); As coach: Taipei Gida (2002); Lotte Giants (2003); Seibu Lions/Saitama Seibu Lions (2004–2009, 2011, 2014)

Career highlights and awards
- Pacific League MVP (1992); Eiji Sawamura Award (1992); Japan Series MVP (1992)
Medals
Men's baseball
Representing Japan
Olympic Games
Silver medal – second place	1988 Seoul	Team

Takehiro Ishii (石井 丈裕, born October 25, 1964) is a Japanese former professional baseball pitcher. He played for the Japan national baseball team in 1988, and in Nippon Professional Baseball (NPB) for the Seibu Lions and the Nippon-Ham Fighters from 1989 to 1999.

Along with Shigeru Sugishita (1954) and Tsuneo Horiuchi (1972), he is one of only three players in NPB history to have won the Most Valuable Player Award, the Eiji Sawamura Award, and the Japan Series MVP in the same season.

== Biographical Information ==
Ishii attended Waseda Jitsugyo High School and Hosei University.

Ishii played for the Japanese national baseball team at the 1988 Summer Olympics and the 1988 Baseball World Cup. He led all pitchers in the 1988 Cup in strikeouts (32 in 27-1/3 IP), beating out the likes of Andy Benes, Ben McDonald, Charles Nagy, Jim Abbott, Hideo Nomo and Orlando Hernández. Ishii went 3–0 with a save and a 0.99 ERA. He allowed only two walks and 15 hits. He joined Abbott as the tourney's All-Star pitchers. He tried to save the semifinals after Hideo Nomo faltered in the 8th but allowed a single, triple, and a balk without retiring anyone in the loss to Cuba that eliminated Japan.

Ishii pitched for the Seibu Lions from 1989 through 1997, and the Nippon-Ham Fighters in 1998 and 1999. Going 15–3 with a 1.94 ERA in 1992, he was named Most Valuable Player of the Pacific League, also winning the Eiji Sawamura Award. To cap it off, he compiled a 2–0 record with 2 complete games, allowing 1 earned runs 19 innings, with 18 strikeouts in the 1992 Japan Series, winning the MVP Award as the Lions defeated the Yakult Swallows 4-games-to-3.

Ishii finished his playing career in 2001 with the Taipei Gida of the Taiwan Major League.

He is currently a coach with the Saitama Seibu Lions.
