= Koji Akiyama =

Japanese baseball player (born 1962)

Koji Akiyama 秋山 幸二
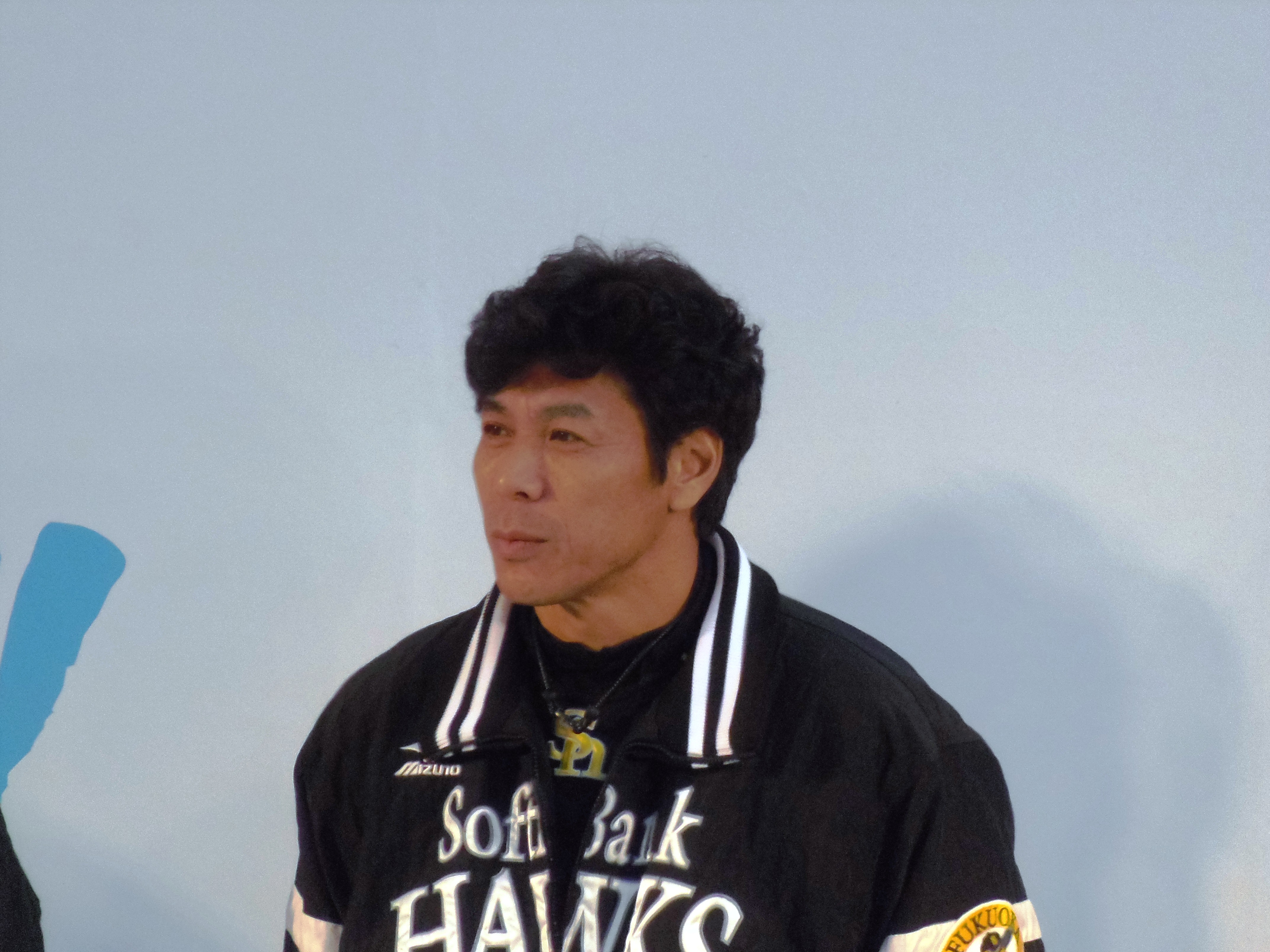
- Outfielder / Manager
- Born: April 6, 1962 (age 64); Miyahara, Kumamoto, Japan
- Batted: Right Threw: Right

NPB debut
- September 29, 1981, for the Seibu Lions

Last appearance
- October 6, 2002, for the Fukuoka Daiei Hawks

NPB statistics
- Batting average: .270
- Home runs: 437
- Hits: 2,157
- Runs batted in: 1,321
- Stolen bases: 303
- Stats at Baseball Reference

Teams
- As player: Seibu Lions (1981 – 1993); Fukuoka Daiei Hawks (1994 – 2002); As coach: Fukuoka SoftBank Hawks (2005 – 2008); As manager: Fukuoka SoftBank Hawks (2009 – 2014)

Member of the Japanese

Baseball Hall of Fame
- Induction: 2014

Koji Akiyama (秋山 幸二 Akiyama Kōji, born April 6, 1962) is a retired Japanese professional baseball player. He played for the Seibu Lions and the Fukuoka Daiei Hawks (currently the Fukuoka SoftBank Hawks) in Japan's Nippon Professional Baseball (NPB).

== Playing career ==
A speedy slugger, Akiyama accumulated more than 400 career home runs and 300 career stolen bases, a feat matched only by one other NPB player in history (Isao Harimoto). Akiyama was an integral part of the "Invincible Seibu" during the 1980s and 1990s, named such due to their sustained domination of the league, winning 11 league championships and eight Japan Series championships between 1982–1994. (Akiyama left Seibu after the 1993 season.) On July 13, 1989, Akiyama hit for the cycle.

Around 1990, he was called "The man closest to the Major Leagues." At the time, it was an unimaginable dream for a Japanese player to play in MLB, but his ability, which was complete with running, hitting, and fielding, led to that nickname.

Akiayma was a Best Nine Award-winner eight times, a Golden Glove winner 11 times (1987–1996, 1999), and appeared in 18 consecutive Nippon Professional Baseball All-Star Series (1985–2002), an NPB record. In addition, Akiyama was Japan Series MVP twice (1991 and 1999), and a Matsutaro Shoriki Award-winner three times (1991, 2011, and 2014). (He also struck out 1,712 times, third on the all-time list.) Akiyama was elected to the Japanese Baseball Hall of Fame in 2014. He is also a member of Meikyukai (the Golden Players Club).

== Managing career ==
He replaced Sadaharu Oh on October 8, 2008 as manager of the Hawks, serving as the team's manager through 2014.

== Career statistics ==
Year	Team	Squad number	G	AB	R	H	2B	3B	HR	TB	RBI	SB	BB+HBP	SO	BA
1981	Seibu Lions	71	3	5	1	1	0	1	0	3	0	0	1	2	.200
1982	Seibu Lions	24	Played at San Jose Bees to train												
1983	Seibu Lions	24	Played at San Jose Bees to train												
1984	Seibu Lions	24	54	140	16	33	5	2	4	54	14	6	13	32	.236
1985	Seibu Lions	24	**130**	468	93	118	16	0	40	254	93	17	70	**115**	.252
1986	Seibu Lions	24	**130**	492	88	132	19	3	41	280	115	21	63	94	.268
1987	Seibu Lions	1	**130**	496	82	130	13	2	**43**	276	94	38	51	**102**	.262
1988	Seibu Lions	1	**130**	517	93	151	23	2	38	**292**	103	20	58	**132**	.292
1989	Seibu Lions	1	**130**	478	92	144	24	4	31	269	99	31	73	93	.301
1990	Seibu Lions	1	**130**	476	84	122	16	0	35	243	91	**51**	73	120	.256
1991	Seibu Lions	1	116	455	**97**	135	23	3	35	**269**	88	21	55	96	.297
1992	Seibu Lions	1	**130**	480	**92**	142	26	2	31	265	89	13	83	114	.296
1993	Seibu Lions	1	127	470	67	116	23	4	30	237	72	9	65	136	.247
1994	Daiei Hawks	1	129	473	93	120	26	5	24	228	73	26	90	125	.254
1995	Daiei Hawks	1	122	476	61	127	25	1	21	217	66	13	48	101	.264
1996	Daiei Hawks	1	121	466	53	140	27	0	9	194	66	13	41	78	.300
1997	Daiei Hawks	1	97	371	46	91	20	2	12	151	52	11	47	62	.245
1998	Daiei Hawks	1	115	423	43	110	32	4	10	180	49	7	46	76	.260
1999	Daiei Hawks	1	113	386	41	99	16	2	12	155	44	3	30	83	.256
2000	Daiei Hawks	1	124	427	44	112	23	1	5	152	48	2	51	63	.262
2001	Daiei Hawks	1	82	269	31	77	13	3	11	129	32	1	18	43	.286
2002	Daiei Hawks	1	76	229	14	57	7	0	5	79	25	0	9	45	.249
Career Total			2189	7997	1231	2157	377	41	437	3927	1312	303	985	1712	.270

※Bolded figures are league leading

=== Titles and accomplishments ===
- Home Run Champion : once (1987)
- Stolen Bases Champion : once (1990)
- Decisive RBIs Champion : 4 times (1985,1987)

== See also ==
- List of top Nippon Professional Baseball home run hitters
- List of Nippon Professional Baseball players with 1,000 runs batted in
- List of Nippon Professional Baseball career hits leaders
