= List of Nippon Professional Baseball players (T) =

The following is a list of Nippon Professional Baseball players with the last name starting with T, retired or active.

== T ==
- Kazuya Tabata
- Koichi Tabuchi
- Akihiro Tabuki
- Takashi Tachikawa
- Kazuhito Tadano
- Masanori Taguchi
- So Taguchi
- Koji Tahara
- Yasuaki Taihoh
- Kohichi Taira
- Toshio Tajima
- Makoto Takada
- Shigeru Takada
- Takuya Takaesu
- Hiromitsu Takagi
- Hiroyuki Takagi
- Koji Takagi
- Morimichi Takagi
- Taisei Takagi
- Yasunari Takagi
- Takayuki Takaguchi
- Takuya Takahama
- Akifumi Takahashi
- Akinori Takahashi
- Hideaki Takahashi
- Hideki Takahashi
- Hisanori Takahashi
- Ikuo Takahashi
- Kaoru Takahashi
- Kazumasa Takahashi
- Kazumi Takahashi
- Kazuyuki Takahashi
- Ken Takahashi
- Koichi Takahashi
- Koji Takahashi
- Masahiro Takahashi
- Mitsunobu Takahashi
- Nobuo Takahashi
- Noriyuki Takahashi
- Satoshi Takahashi
- Shinji Takahashi
- Toru Takahashi
- Toshiro Takahashi
- Yoshinobu Takahashi
- Yusuke Takahashi
- Yuhei Takai
- Shun Takaichi
- Masahiro Takami
- Kazuya Takamiya
- Koji Takamizawa
- Yuki Takamori
- Hiroshi Takamura
- Fumikazu Takanami
- Toshihiro Takanashi
- Fumitoshi Takano
- Shinobu Takano
- Kentaro Takasaki
- Toru Takashima
- Yosuke Takasu
- Shingo Takatsu
- Nobuyuki Takatsuka
- Hiroaki Takaya
- Hisashi Takayama
- Ikuo Takayama
- Kenichi Takayama
- Tomoyuki Takayama
- Izumi Takayanagi
- Hisashi Takeda
- Kazuhiro Takeda
- Masaru Takeda
- Shiro Takegami
- Naotaka Takehara
- Koji Takekiyo
- Shota Takekuma
- Kazuhiro Takeoka
- Yuki Takeshima
- Akifumi Takeshita
- Jun Takeshita
- Shintaro Takeshita
- Kazuya Takeuchi
- Shinichi Takeuchi
- Yoshiya Takeuchi
- Shingo Takeyama
- Masahiro Takumi
- Shigeo Tamaki
- Tomotaka Tamaki
- Yutaka Tamaki
- Nobunori Tamamine
- Hiromasa Tamano
- Hitoshi Tamaru
- Kenta Tamayama
- Kenjiro Tamiya
- Akihiro Tamura
- Fujio Tamura
- Hitoshi Tamura
- Kei Tamura
- Ryohei Tamura
- Tsutomu Tamura
- Manabu Tanabe
- Norio Tanabe
- Akira Tanaka
- Daijiro Tanaka
- Daisuke Tanaka
- Hirokazu Tanaka
- Hiroto Tanaka
- Hiroyasu Tanaka
- Kazunori Tanaka
- Kenjiro Tanaka
- Kensuke Tanaka
- Kentaro Tanaka
- Masahiko Tanaka
- Masahiro Tanaka
- Masaoki Tanaka
- Mitsuru Tanaka
- Mizuki Tanaka
- Naoki Tanaka
- Ryohei Tanaka
- Satoshi Tanaka
- Shintaro Tanaka
- Shuta Tanaka
- Sohji Tanaka
- Takashi Tanaka
- Toshiaki Tanaka
- Yasuhiro Tanaka
- Yoshiki Tanaka
- Yoshio Tanaka
- Yukio Tanaka
- Kenji Tanba
- Mikio Tanba
- Hitoshi Taneda
- Hiroya Tani
- Tetsuya Tani
- Yoshitomo Tani
- Etsuji Taniguchi
- Koichi Taniguchi
- Kuniyuki Taniguchi
- Shinji Taninaka
- Motonobu Tanishige
- Yuki Tanno
- Hidenori Tanoue
- Keisaburo Tanoue
- Yasushi Tao
- Tony Tarasco
- Naoyuki Tateishi
- Shohei Tateyama
- Yoshinori Tateyama
- Mitsuo Tatsukawa
- Kazuyoshi Tatsunami
- Jim Tatum
- Masahiro Tazaki
- Yuya Tazawa
- Satoshi Tejima
- Ryuhei Terada
- Yuya Terada
- Hayato Terahara
- Masao Teramae
- Hirofumi Teramoto
- Shiro Teramoto
- Tomokazu Teramura
- Takayuki Terauchi
- Bobby Thigpen
- Brad Thomas
- Jason Thompson
- Ryan Thompson
- Ozzie Timmons
- Hiroshi Tobe
- Masafumi Togano
- Kazuhiro Togashi
- Shun Tono
- Hisashi Tokano
- Yoshinari Tokuda
- Masanori Tokumoto
- Satoshi Tokumoto
- Katsuki Tokura
- Tetsuto Tomabechi
- Kenji Tomashino
- Seiji Tomashino
- Akira Tominaga
- Hisaki Tomioka
- Yui Tomori
- Yusuke Torigoe
- Takashi Toritani
- Kenichi Toriyabe
- Shōji Tōyama
- Jiro Toyoda
- Kiyoshi Toyoda
- Yasumitsu Toyoda
- Akiyoshi Toyoshima
- Andy Tracy
- Tomochika Tsuboi
- Michinori Tsubouchi
- Hidetoshi Tsuburaya
- Teppei Tsuchiya
- Daiki Tsuda
- Chikara Tsugawa
- Hatsuhiko Tsuji
- Ryutaro Tsuji
- Takeshi Tsuji
- Toshiya Tsuji
- Kento Tsujimoto
- Osamu Tsujita
- Takanobu Tsujiuchi
- Hiroshi Tsuno
- Naoto Tsuru
- Kazunari Tsuruoka
- Kazuto Tsuruoka
- Shinya Tsuruoka
- Yasushi Tsuruta
- Kazuya Tsutsui
- Masaya Tsutsui
- Soh Tsutsui
- Takeshi Tsutsumiuchi
- Katsuyuki Tsuzuki
- Jason Turman
- Brad Tweedlie
