= Tamaki =

Tamaki or Tāmaki may refer to:

== New Zealand ==
- Tāmaki, a suburb of Auckland to the west of the Tamaki River
- Tamaki City, city in the Auckland region between 1987–1989
- Tāmaki (New Zealand electorate), in Auckland
- Tāmaki Makaurau (New Zealand electorate), in Auckland
- East Tāmaki, a suburb of Auckland to the east of the Tamaki River
- Tāmaki River, in Auckland
- Tāmaki Strait, between Waiheke Island and the North Island
- Tāmaki isthmus, the location of the Auckland CBD and central suburbs
- Tāmaki Makaurau, or just Tāmaki, the Māori name for Auckland

== Other countries ==
- Tamaki, Afghanistan
- Tamaki, Mie, Japan

== Other uses ==
- Tamaki (name), people
