= Takeyama =

Takeyama (竹山, "bamboo mountain") is a Japanese surname. Notable people with the surname include:

- Cunning Takeyama (born 1971) stage name of Takanori Takeyama
- Michio Takeyama (1903–1984), Japanese writer
- Takanori Takeyama (born 1971), member of the Japanese comedy duo Cunning (owarai)
- Shingo Takeyama (born 1984), Japanese baseball player
- Yō Takeyama (born 1946), Japanese screenwriter

== See also ==
- 8706 Takeyama, a main-belt asteroid
