= Shinichi Katoh =

Japanese baseball player

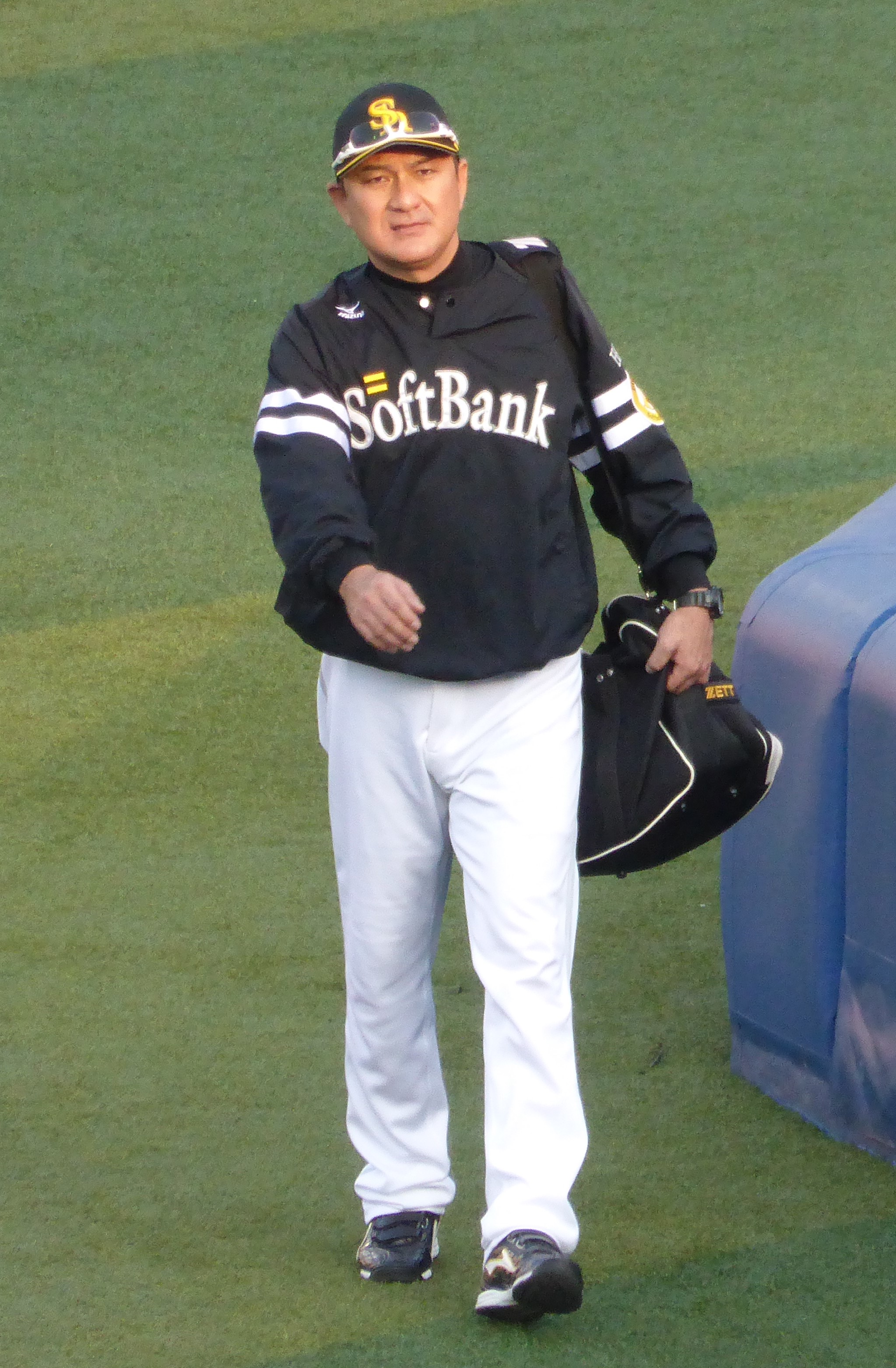
- Pitcher / Coach
- Born: July 19, 1965 (age 61); Kurayoshi, Tottori, Japan
- Batted: Right Threw: Right

NPB debut
- April 30, 1984, for the Nankai Hawks

Last NPB appearance
- September 24, 2004, for the Osaka Kintetsu Buffaloes

NPB statistics (through 2004)
- Win–loss record: 92-106
- Saves: 12
- ERA: 4.21
- Strikeouts: 743
- Stats at Baseball Reference

Teams
- As player: Nankai Hawks/Fukuoka Daiei Hawks (1984–1995); Hiroshima Toyo Carp (1996–1998); Orix BlueWave (1999–2001); Osaka Kintetsu Buffaloes (2002–2004); As coach: Fukuoka SoftBank Hawks (2011–2014)

Career highlights and awards
- 3x NPB All-Star (1985, 1988, 2001); Comeback Player of the Year (1996)
- Last updated on: 9 February 2014

Shinichi Katoh (加藤 伸一, born July 19, 1965, in Kurayoshi, Tottori, Japan) is a former Nippon Professional Baseball pitcher.
