= 竹山 =

竹山 may refer to:

- Takeyama, Japanese surname
- Zhushan, Nantou, township in Nantou County, Taiwan
- Zhushan County, county in Shiyan, northwestern Hubei province, China
