= Tamaki (name) =

Tamaki is both a Japanese surname and a unisex Japanese given name, as well as a Māori name, Ryukyuan surname. In the Okinawan language, Tamaki is read as Tamagusuku, Tamagushiku or Tamashiro. Notable people with the name include:

== Surname ==
=== Japanese origin ===
- Ellen Tamaki (born 1992), American actor
- Hiroshi Tamaki (玉木 宏; born 1980), Japanese actor and singer
- Jillian Tamaki (born 1980), Canadian American illustrator and comic artist
- Kōji Tamaki (玉置 浩二; born 1958), Japanese singer-songwriter
- Mariko Tamaki (born 1975), Canadian artist and writer
- Nami Tamaki (玉置 成実; born 1988), Japanese singer
- Nozomu Tamaki (環 望; born 1966), Japanese manga artist
- Tomotaka Tamaki (玉木 朋孝; born 1975), Japanese former professional baseball player
- Yuichiro Tamaki (玉木 雄一郎; born 1969), Japanese politician
- Yukiko Tamaki (環有 希; born 1980), Japanese voice actor
- Yutaka Tamaki (玉置 隆; born 1986), Japanese professional baseball player

=== Ryukyuan origin ===
- Denny Tamaki (玉城 デニー; born 1959), Japanese politician, current Governor of Okinawa Prefecture
- Nina Tamaki (玉城 仁菜; born 1996), Japanese voice actor and singer

=== Māori origin ===
- Brian Tamaki (born 1958), New Zealand Christian fundamentalist religious leader
- Hannah Tamaki (born 1960), New Zealand Christian fundamentalist religious leader
- Kiwi Tāmaki (died c. 1741), Māori warrior and paramount chief
- Nireaha Tamaki (born 1835–37 - 1911) New Zealand Māori leader from the Rangitāne and Ngāti Kahungunu iwi
- Suzanne Tamaki New Zealand fibre-based artist
- Teresa Te Tamaki (born 1981) New Zealand former rugby union player

== Given name ==
- Tamaki Daido (大道 珠貴; born 1966), Japanese writer
- Tamaki Ishizuka (石塚 瑶季; born 2004), Japanese idol of idol group Hinatazaka46
- Tamaki Katori (香取 環; born 1938), Japanese actress
- Tamaki Kawakubo (川久保 賜紀; born 1979), Japanese-American violinist
- Tamaki Matsumoto (松元 環季; born 1999), Japanese voice actress and actress
- Tamaki Matsuoka (松岡 環; born 1947), Japanese activist
- Tamaki Miura (三浦 環; 1884–1946), Japanese opera singer
- Tamaki Nakanishi (仲西 環; 1976–2020), Japanese actress and singer
- Tamaki Okuma (大熊 環; born 2001), Japanese professional footballer
- Tamaki Saitō (斎藤 環; born 1961), Japanese psychologist and critic
- Tamaki Tokuyama (徳山 璉; 1903–1942), Japanese singer
- Tamaki Uchiyama (内山 環; born 1972), Japanese former football player
- Tamaki Uemura (植村 環; 1890–1982), Japanese YWCA executive, pacifist, and Christian pastor
- Tamaki Kunishi, Japanese musician, member of post-rock group Mono

== Fictional characters ==
- Tamaki (たまき) from the Dead or Alive video game series
- Tamaki Amajiki (天喰 環) from My Hero Academia
- Tamaki Honda (本田 珠輝), protagonist of the manga series Magic of Stella
- Tamaki Ichinose (一ノ瀬 珠樹) in Young Ladies Don't Play Fighting Games
- Tamaki Kawazoe (川添 珠姫) in Bamboo Blade
- Tamaki Kousaka (向坂 環) in ToHeart2
- Tamaki Kotatsu (環 古達) from Fire Force
- Tamaki Suoh (須王 環) in Ouran High School Host Club
- Iroha Tamaki (環 いろは) from Magia Record
- Shinichirō Tamaki (玉城 真一郎) from Code Geass
- Mari Tamaki (玉木 マリ), a character in the anime series A Place Further than the Universe
- Tamaki Yamazaki (山崎 珠姫), a character of the manga series Tamayomi
- Tamaki Irie (イリエ・タマキ), a character of the manga series Majestic Prince
