= Kyosuke Sasaki =

Kyosuke Sasaki may refer to:

- Kyosuke Sasaki (baseball)
- Kyosuke Sasaki (mixed martial artist)
