= Naotaka =

- Gender: Male

Origin
- Origin: Japanese
- Meaning: Different meanings depending on the kanji used

Naotaka (written: 直孝 or 直隆) is a masculine Japanese given name. Notable people with the name include:

- Ii Naotaka (井伊 直孝; 1590–1659), Japanese daimyō
- Makara Naotaka (真柄 直隆; 1536–1570), Japanese samurai
- Naotaka Takeda (武田 直隆; born 1978), Japanese footballer
- Naotaka Takehara (竹原 直隆; born 1980), Japanese baseball player
