= Tsunemi =

- Pronunciation: tsɯnemi (IPA)
- Gender: Male

Origin
- Origin: Japanese
- Meaning: Different meanings depending on the kanji used

Other names
- Alternative spelling: Tunemi (Kunrei-shiki) Tunemi (Nihon-shiki) Tsunemi (Hepburn)

Tsunemi is both a masculine Japanese given name and a Japanese surname.

== Written forms ==
Tsunemi can be written using different combinations of kanji characters. Here are some examples:

- 常見, "usual, see"
- 常巳, "usual, sign of the snake (Chinese zodiac)"
- 常実, "usual, fruit/reality"
- 常實, "usual, fruit/reality"
- 常三, "usual, three"
- 常美, "usual, beauty"
- 常未, "usual, not yet"
- 恒巳, "always, sign of the snake (Chinese zodiac)"
- 恒実, "always, fruit/reality"
- 恒實, "always, fruit/reality"
- 恒三, "always, three"
- 恒美, "always, beauty"
- 恒未, "always, not yet"
- 庸巳, "common, sign of the snake (Chinese zodiac)"
- 庸実, "common, fruit/reality"
- 庸實, "common, fruit/reality"
- 庸三, "common, three"
- 毎巳, "every, sign of the snake (Chinese zodiac)"
- 毎実, "every, fruit/reality"
- 毎實, "every, fruit/reality"
- 毎三, "every, three"

The name can also be written in hiragana つねみ or katakana ツネミ.

== Notable people with the given name Tsunemi ==
- Tsunemi Kubodera (窪寺 恒己) (born 1951), Japanese zoologist.
- Tsunemi Tsuda (津田 恒実) (1960–1993), Japanese baseball player.

== See also ==
- 8543 Tsunemi, main-belt asteroid
