= Takehara (surname) =

Takehara (written: 竹原 or 嵩原) is a Japanese surname. Notable people with the surname include:

- Takehara An'i (嵩原 親方 安依, 1651–1697), Ryukyuan bureaucrat
- Takehara Anshitsu (嵩原 親方 安執, 1756–1811), Ryukyuan bureaucrat
- Kinya Takehara (竹原 欣也, born 1974), Japanese footballer
- Naotaka Takehara (竹原 直隆, born 1980), Japanese baseball player
- Shinji Takehara (竹原 慎二, born 1972), Japanese boxer
