= Noriko Matsumoto =

Japanese singer

- 松本 典子
- Born: 30 January 1968 (age 58); Mitaka, Tokyo, Japan
- Occupations: Singer; television personality
- Years active: 1984–1992; 2011–present
- Spouse: Kenji Tomashino (m. 1992)
- Awards: Japan Record Awards New Artist Award (1985)

Noriko Matsumoto (Japanese: 松本 典子, Hepburn: Matsumoto Noriko; born 30 January 1968) is a Japanese singer and television personality. After winning the Grand Prize at the 1984 Miss Seventeen Contest, she debuted as an idol singer with her song "Shunshoku no Airmail" and had four more singles chart in the Oricon Singles Chart Top 30 and a Japan Record Awards New Artist Award, and she was a regular cast member at the variety show Shimura Ken no Daijobu dā. She went on a career break after her 1992 marriage to baseball player Kenji Tomashino, before making a comeback in the early-2010s.

== Biography ==
Noriko Matsumoto was born on 30 January 1968 in Mitaka, Tokyo. Her real given name Miwako (美和子) is said to have the meaning of Utsukushiku itsu made mo heiwa na ko dearu yō ni (美しくいつまでも平和な子であるように; lit. 'May you be a beautiful and peaceful child forever'). She moved to the Jindaiji area of Chōfu when she was three, to Akishima, Tokyo when she was five, and due to her father's job, Isesaki during her third year of junior high school. After she chose a co-ed high school instead of a girls' high school due to the cuteness of school uniforms, she began studying at Kyoai Gakuen Junior High School.

In August 1984, she and Naoko Amihama won the Grand Prize at the Miss Seventeen Contest. Her sister had recommended the magazine to her before she entered the pageant. In 1985, she made her idol debut with her song "Shunshoku no Airmail". It charted at #28 in the Oricon Singles Chart, and four more singles charted in the Top 30: "Aoi Kaze no Beachside", "Sayonara to Iwarete", "Nijiiro Scandal", and "No Wonder". She was awarded the New Artist Award at the 27th Japan Record Awards for her song "Sayonara to Iwarete". In 1987, she joined the Fuji TV variety show Shimura Ken no Daijobu dā as a regular cast member. In 1992, she married baseball player Kenji Tomashino, and afterwards began a career hiatus to focus on raising her children.

In the early-2010s, she returned from her career hiatus. In September 2011, she made her first singing appearance in nineteen years, on the NHK BS Premium music show J-Pop Seishun no '80. On 29 April 2018, she made her first gravure appearance in twenty years in the magazine Flash. In December 2019, she made her first radio appearance in 26 years on Nippon Cultural Broadcasting's Sposta Mix Zone, appearing alongside her husband.

She and her husband have three sons. She is the sister-in-law of baseball player Seiji Tomashino and the paternal aunt of actors Kazuma Tomashino and Hitomi Tomashino.

== Discography ==
Title	Year	Details	Peak chart positions		Sales
Title	Year	Details	JPN	JPN Hot	Sales
"Shunshoku no Airmail"	1985	Released: 21 March 1985	28	—	—
"Aoi Kaze no Beachside"	1985	Released: 21 June 1985	30	—	—
"Sayonara to Iwarete"	1985	Released: 21 September 1985	17	—	—
"Nijiiro Scandal"	1986	Released: 26 February 1986	28	—	—
"No Wonder"	1986	Released: 21 May 1986	29	—	—
"—" denotes releases that did not chart or were not released in that region.
