= Toshihide Narimoto =

Japanese baseball player

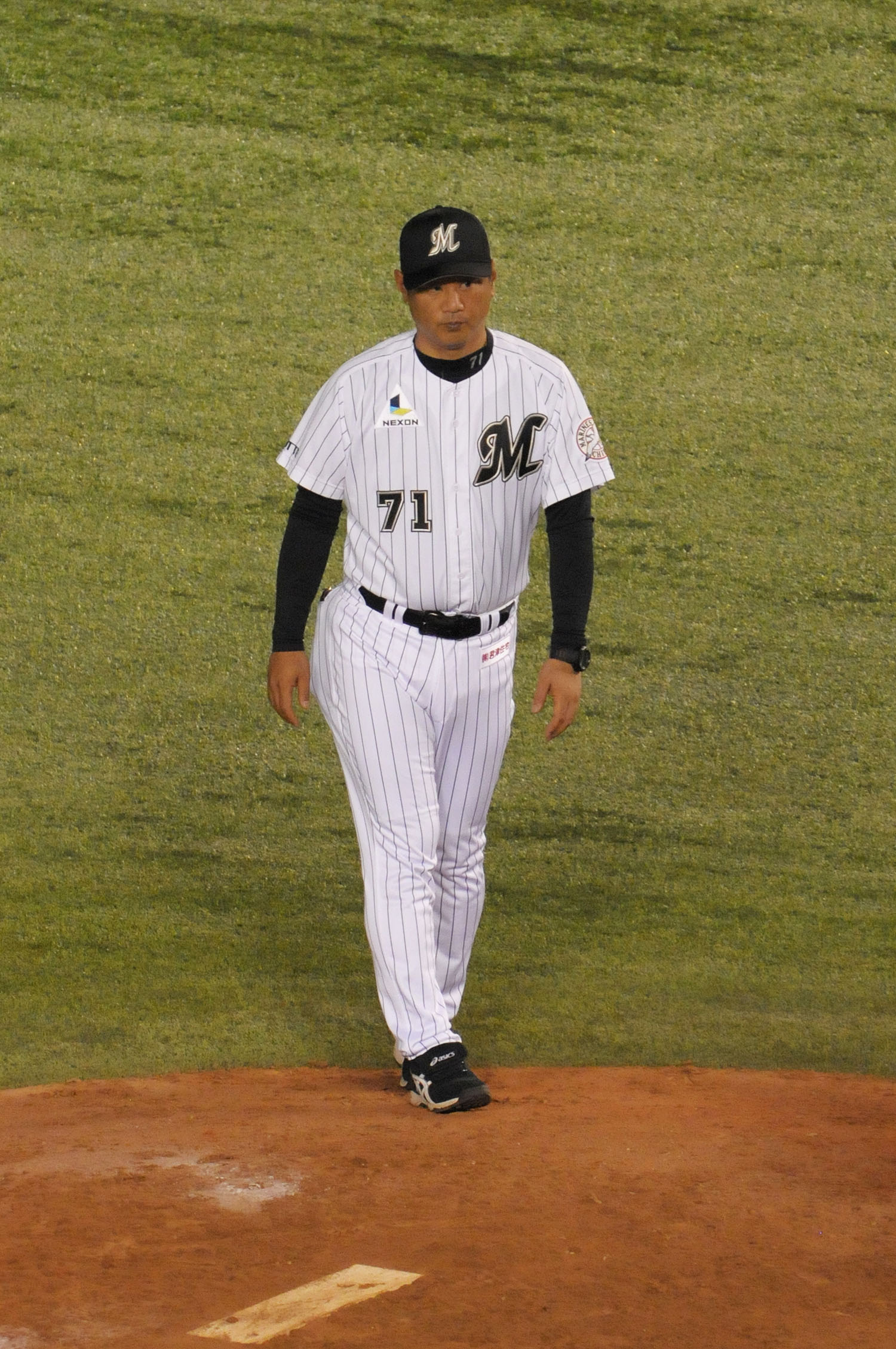
- Pitcher
- Born: September 11, 1968; Nishinomiya, Hyōgo, Japan
- Batted: Right Threw: Right

Professional debut
- NPB: April 14, 1993, for the Chiba Lotte Marines
- CPBL: 18 March, 2005, for the Uni-President Lions

Last appearance
- NPB: May 26, 2004, for the Yakult Swallows
- CPBL: April 20, 2005, for the Uni-President Lions

NPB statistics
- Win–loss record: 26–20
- Earned run average: 3.33
- Strikeouts: 359
- Saves: 83

CPBL statistics
- Win–loss record: 2–2
- Earned run average: 3.90
- Strikeouts: 19
- Saves: 0

Teams
- As player: Chiba Lotte Marines (1993–2000); Hanshin Tigers (2001–2002); Yakult Swallows (2003–2004); Uni-President Lions (2005); As coach: Tokyo Yakult Swallows (2006–2007, 2015–2016); Chiba Lotte Marines (2008–2012)

Career highlights and awards
- Comeback Player of the Year (2001); 3× NPB All-Star (1995, 1996, 2001)
- Last updated on: 18 January 2026

Toshihide Narimoto (成本 年秀, Narimoto Toshihide; born September 11, 1968, in Nishinomiya, Hyōgo, Japan) is a Japanese former Nippon Professional Baseball pitcher.
