= Kaitai-Shin Show =

Japanese television series

The Kaitai-Shin Show (解体新ショー, Kaitai Shin Shō) is a Japanese TV program on questions about the human body broadcast on NHK General TV from 2007 to 2009.

== Introduction ==
This program is about the human body. This program started in 2006 as a segment on Bangumi Tamago, hosted by NHK announcer Yumiko Udō and Lasa-R Ishii. It started regular broadcasting, hosted by Taichi Kokubun and Yuka Kubota, an announcer of NHK Shizuoka (Kubota transferred to Tokyo in March 2008), on April 14, 2007. Two comedians present information about the human body and professors support their presentation and also explain it. The audiences judge which presentation is easy to understand or interesting. The broadcasting finished on March 13, 2009.

== Cast ==
- Taichi Kokubun – Host
- Yuka Kubota – Announcer
- Aya Hirano – Narrator
- Gekidan Hitori - presenter
- Kirin (Hiroshi Tamura and Akira Kawashima) - presenter
- Penalty (Hideki Nakagawa and Yasuhito Wakita) - presenter
- Takanori Takeyama - presenter
- Kunihiro Matsumura - presenter
- Dachō Club - (Ryuhei Ueshima, Jimon Terakado, and Katsuhiro Higo)- presenter
- Hanamaru-Daikichi Hakata - presenter

== Music ==
- Tanin no Kankei (instrumental, original sung by Katsuko Kanai)
