= Nippon Professional Baseball Comeback Player of the Year Award =

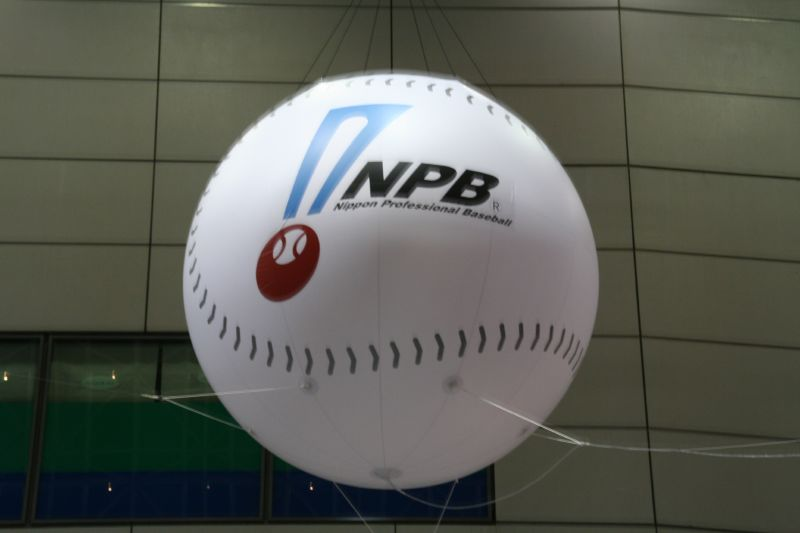

The Nippon Professional Baseball Comeback Player of the Year Award is given to one player in each league of Central League and Pacific League.

It is given to a player who makes a major comeback from an illness, injury, or a long-term slump. The Pacific and Central leagues have different criteria for the award, with the Pacific League having a much stricter criteria.The award is also not an annual award and is only given on occasion if a player meets the criteria specified by each league.

Yūdai Ōno won the award in 2025, the first Central League player to win the award since Daisuke Matsuzaka in 2018. The most recent Pacific League to win the Comeback Player of the Year was Osaka Kintetsu Buffaloes player Koki Morita in 2001.

== NPB Comeback Player of the Year Award ==
Year	Player	Team	League
1974	Kōzō Ishioka	Yakult Swallows	Central
1975	Sōhachi Aniya	Hanshin Tigers	Central
1976	Kazuhide Funada	Yakult Swallows	Central
1977	Keishi Asano	Yomiuri Giants	Central
1978	Osamu Nomura	Taiyo Whales	Central
1979	Toshiyuki Mimura	Hiroshima Toyo Carp	Central
1980	Kenichi Yazawa	Chunichi Dragons	Central
1980	Hiromitsu Kadota	Nankai Hawks	Pacific
1981	Taira Fujita	Hanshin Tigers	Central
1984	Takamasa Suzuki	Chunichi Dragons	Central
1985	Choji Murata	Lotte Orions	Pacific
1986	Tsunemi Tsuda	Hiroshima Toyo Carp	Central
1987	Tōru Sugiura	Yakult Swallows	Central
1987	Hisao Niura	Taiyo Whales	Central
1988	Shuzo Arita	Yomiuri Giants	Central
1989	Takashi Nishimoto	Chunichi Dragons	Central
1989	Takayoshi Nakao	Yomiuri Giants	Central
1990	Sadaaki Yoshimura	Yomiuri Giants	Central
1990	Kazuhiko Endo	Taiyo Whales	Central
1991	Kazuyoshi Ono	Kintetsu Buffaloes	Pacific
1991	Kazuyuki Shirai	Nippon-Ham Fighters	Pacific
1992	Akimitsu Ito	Yakult Swallows	Central
1993	Kenjiro Kawasaki	Yakult Swallows	Central
1994	Toshikatsu Hikono	Chunichi Dragons	Central
1996	Shinichi Kato	Hiroshima Carp	Central
1997	Tomohito Ito	Yakult Swallows	Central
1998	Takashi Saito	Yokohama BayStars	Central
1998	Tatsuji Nishimura	Fukuoka Daiei Hawks	Pacific
1999	Shōji Tōyama	Hanshin Tigers	Central
2000	Hitoshi Taneda	Chunichi Dragons	Central
2001	Toshihide Narimoto	Hanshin Tigers	Central
2001	Koki Morita	Osaka Kintetsu Buffaloes	Pacific
2002	Tomonori Maeda	Hiroshima Toyo Carp	Central
2003	Masafumi Hirai	Chunichi Dragons	Central
2003	Ken Suzuki	Yakult Swallows	Central
2004	Hiroki Kokubo	Yomiuri Giants	Central
2008	Keiichi Hirano	Hanshin Tigers	Central
2012	Kan Otake	Hiroshima Toyo Carp	Central
2015	Shohei Tateyama	Tokyo Yakult Swallows	Central
2017	Hitoki Iwase	Chunichi Dragons	Central
2018	Daisuke Matsuzaka	Chunichi Dragons	Central
2025	Yūdai Ōno	Chunichi Dragons	Central

== See also ==
- Nippon Professional Baseball#Awards
- Baseball awards#Japan
- Major League Baseball Comeback Player of the Year Award
