= Cunning Takeyama =

Japanese tarento, comedian and actor (born 1971)

- カンニング竹山
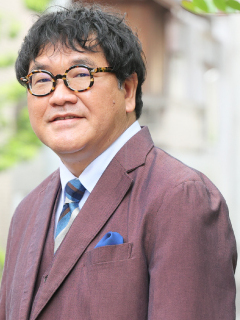
- Born: Takanori Takeyama; 30 March 1971 (age 55); Jōnan-ku, Fukuoka, Fukuoka Prefecture, Japan
- Other name: Take-chan (竹ちゃん)
- Education: Fukuoka Prefecture Hayasara High School
- Occupations: Comedian; actor
- Years active: 1990–present
- Agent: Sun Music Production
- Notable work: Tamao Akae: Tama musubi
- Style: Kire-gei; ijirare-gei; reaction-gei; propaganda
- Television: Current; Knight Scoop; Sun Music Get Live; Sekai Seifuku! Takeyama Juku; Former; Tora no Mon; Takeyama-sensei?; Warai no Kin Medal; Masahiro Nakai no Black Comedy; Kanjani no Shiwake Eight
- Partners: Kenbo Tanaka (Tābō Kenbō); Tadayuki Nakashima (Cunning)
- Website: Official profile

Cunning Takeyama (カンニング竹山, Kanningu Takeyama; born 30 March 1971) is a Japanese tarento, comedian and actor.

Takeyama performed boke in the comedy duo Cunning and is known for his often "angry" persona while at the same time being an "easy to tease" character. His real name and former stage name in the duo is Takanori Takeyama (竹山 隆範, Takeyama Takanori).

Takeyama is also known for his fandom of American football, National Football League and the Green Bay Packers.

== Filmography ==
=== Current appearances ===
Regular

Year	Title	Network	Ref.
	Chokugeki Live Goody!	Fuji TV	
	Minna no News: Wonder	KTV	
	Non Stop!	Fuji TV	
	Knight Scoop	ABC	
	Sekai Seifuku! Takeyama Juku	TV Asahi Channel	
	Cunning no Dai Yasuyoshi-bi!	BS Fuji	
	Cunning no Renai Chūdoku	GyaO	
	Cunning Takeyama no Maemuki Conte! Ippon Shōbu	Fuji TV	
2016	Hakunetsu Live: Vivit	TBS	

Quasi-regular

Title	Network
Sōdatta no ka! Akira Ikegami no Manaberu News	TV Asahi
Akko ni omakase!	TBS
Ameagari Ketsushitai no Talk Bangumi Ame-talk!	TV Asahi
London Hearts	TV Asahi
Makō Ōkoku–Umazukingdam	Fuji TV

=== Former appearances ===
Year	Title	Network
2013	Aiba Manabu	TV Asahi
	Tamori Club	TV Asahi
	Tameshite Gatten	NHK-G

==== Variety programmes ====
Former regular programmes

Year	Title	Network
2001	Tora no Mon	TV Asahi
2004	Warai no Kin Medal	ABC
2005	Odaiba Owarai Dō	Fuji TV One
2005	Ikari Oyaji 3	TV Tokyo
2007	Omoikkiriī!! TV	NTV
2011	Shittoku! Na'e!	TV Asahi
2012	Cunning Takeyama no Zenius no Yoru	MBS
2012	Yajiuma TV!	TV Asahi
2012	Takeyama no yaritai 100 no koto: Zakiyama & Kōmoto no Ijiri Tabi	Fuji TV One

Former quasi-regular programmes

Year	Title	Network
2004	IQ Sapuri	Fuji TV
2004	Masahiro Nakai no Black Comedy	NTV
2006	Ai no Apron	TV Asahi
2008	Otameshika'!	TV Asahi
2012	Kanjani no Shiwake Eight	TV Asahi

Irregular appearances

Year	Title	Network	Ref.
2004	Utaban	TBS	
	Kaitai-Shin Show	NHK	
2007	Tonkotsu TV	NHK Fukuoka	
2010	Mezase! Kaisha no Hoshi	NHK-E	
2013	Shibuya Deep A	NHK	
2013	Kyō no Ryōri	NHK-E	
2014	Korezo! Nippon-ryū!	TV Asahi	
2014	Shinobu Sakagami no Seichō Man!!	TV Asahi	
2014	Koyabugatipin Shashin-kan	Fuji TV One	
	Kiratto ikiru	NHK-E	
	Enta no Kamisama	NTV	

==== Special programmes ====
Year	Title	Network
	All-Star Sekimen Shinkoku! Happening Taishō	TBS
	Owarai Geinin Dai Bōnenkai	NTV
2007	Tsuite ittara kō natta	Fuji TV
2008	Kyōfu no Aponashi Hōmon-sha: Akiko Wada no Konban Majide Tomaru zo Konoyarō!	TBS
2009	FNS Soft Kōjō	UMK
2011	Oha! 6 News Live Special	NTV
2015	Saikin no Wakai mon wa... In the World	TV Asahi
2016	SunValu	NTV
2016	Nichiyō Familia	Fuji TV
2016	Doyō Premium	Fuji TV
2016	Sekai Shōgeki Eizō 100 Renpatsu	TBS

==== TV dramas ====
Year	Title	Role	Network
2005	Yoruō	Takahashi Fujiwara	TBS
2005	The Wave!	Kosuke Nakanishi	
2005	Haruka Seventeen	Furita	TV Asahi
2006	Tsubasa no Oreta Tenshi-tachi	Burpi	Fuji TV
2006	Shimokita Sundays	Regular Sambo	TV Asahi
2006	Otaiba Wangan TV	Bay Tele Art	Fuji TV
2007	Yukipon nō Shigoto	Hiro Inuke	TV Tokyo
2007	Yotsuba Nomukō		NTV
2007	Keijikoroshi: Otto ga Jitaku de Shasatsu sa reta!	Abe	ABC
2007	Shinjitsu no Shuki: BC Kyūsenpan Tetsutaro Kato "Watashi wa Kaininaritai"		NTV
2008	Uramiyahonpo Special: Kazoku no Yami: Monster Family	Takahiro Shirakawa	TV Tokyo
2008	Saitō-san	Kobato City Hall official	NTV
2009	Ocha-beri	Shinji Tobita	MBS
2009	Darekaga Uso o tsuite iru	Marriage fraudster	Fuji TV
2010	Neko Taxi	Tsutomu Masekaki	Tō-Mei-Han Net 6, STV, TVQ
2010	Seichi Matsumoto Drama Special Kiri no Hata	Masao Yanagida	NTV
2010	Tetsu no Hone	Shigeo Nishida	NHK
2011	Onmitsu hi Jō	Toranosuke Wakita	NHK
2011	Hitori janai		BS Fuji
2011	Bartender	Hoppo	TV Asahi
2011	Taro no Tō	Sakyo Komatsu	NHK
2011	Furusato: Musume no Tabidachi	High School Teacher	Fuji TV
2011	Bitter Sugar	Kenji Igarashi	NHK
2012	Hatsukoi	Koji Hiruse	NHK
2013	A Chef of Nobunaga	Tokugawa Ieyasu	TV Asahi
2013	Machigawa re chatta Otoko	Takashi Hachimanyama	Fuji TV
2013	Gekiryū: Watashi o Oboete imasu ka?	Takayuki Okabayashi	NHK
2014	Hanako to Anne	Neinosuke Tokumaru	NHK
2015	Yōgi-sha wa 8-ri no Ninki Geinin	Gaku Kuroda	Fuji TV
2015	Bijo to Danshi	Producer Fujiwara	NHK
2016	Keiji Ballerino	Kanjiro Oniyama	NTV
2019	Idaten		NHK

==== Films ====
Year	Title	Role	Notes	Ref.
2001	Platonic Sex	Salary worker		
2006	Memories of Matsuko	Coach		
2006	Over the Hedge	Vaminator		
2008	Yesterdays	Tertsuo Fujii		
2009	Kansen Rettō	Kousuke Suzuki		
2009	Shugo Tenshi	Keiichi Suka		
2009	Nakumonka	Masanori Yamagishi		
2010	Neko Taxi	Tsutomi Masekaki		
2010	Beck	Kenichi Saito		
2011	Soredemo Hana wa Saite iku	Ocke		
2011	Dog×Police	Takashi Nakamura		
2012	Okaeri, Hayabusa			
2013	Bokutachi no Kōkan Nikki			
2013	Gekijō-ban Time Scoop Hunter -Azuchi-jō Saigo no 1-nichi -	Riko Tanizaki		
2015	Teenage Mutant Ninja Turtles: Out of the Shadows	Master Splinter		
2015	Poison Berry in My Brain			
2019	Tora-san, Wish You Were Here			
2023	Natchan's Little Secret			
2025	Boy's Wish: We Can Use Magic Once in a Lifetime			

==== Radio ====
He made his radio debut in KBS Radio when he was part of Tābō Kenbō.

Year	Title	Network
	Cunning Takeyama: Nama wa Dame Radio	TBS Radio
	Recommen!	NCB
	Hikaru Ijūin Nichiyōbi no Himitsukichi	TBS Radio
	Hi Torishimariyaku Shinnyū Shain	TBS Radio
	News Tankyū Radio Dig	TBS Radio
2004	Oshaberi yatte māsu	K'z Station
2013	Tamao Akae: Tama musubi	TBS Radio
2014	Ogiyahagi no Megane-bīki	TBS Radio
2016	Rokusuke Nanakoro Battō Kyū Jūbun	TBS Radio
2016	Ichi ni no Santarō: Akasaka Getsuyō Yoinokuchi	TBS Radio

==== Advertisements, publicity ====
Year	Title	Ref.
	uno	
	Oshaberi Pichu	
2006	The Amityville Horror	
2006	Hiratsuka Keirinjō	
2006	Fukuoka election commission	
2007	Acom	
2008	Kyushu Electric Power "Yatte mi ma Shōene" campaign	
2015	Lenor Irui no Shōshū Senyō Deodorant Beads	
2015	Nintendo 3DS The Great Ace Attorney: Adventures	
2016	Morinaga Milk Industry "Aloe Este"	
2017	Takayama Shichimise	

== Works ==
=== DVD ===
Year	Title
2005	Cunning no Omoide-zukuri
2005	Dead Ball vol. 5
2006	Cunning no Renai Chūdoku
2009	Hōsō Kinshi
2010	Odaiba Owarai Dō
2012	Zakiyama & Kōmoto no Ijiri Tabi
2013	Zakiyama & Kōmoto no Ijiri Tengoku

=== CD ===
Year	Title
	"Cheoy Hay Yoo Bruce"
2005	"No. 1"
	"Kokoro Bana"

== Internet ==
Title	Ref.
Short Cuts -Jissha-ban-	
YouTube Take-channel	

== Bibliography ==
Year	Title	Book code
2005	Cunning Takeyama no "Odoru Dame Ningen!"	ISBN 4796646418
2007	Gendainihon e no Keishō	ISBN 978-4840117838
2007	Ōsaka Hito wa naze Furikomesagi ni Hikkakaranai no ka	ISBN 4594052479
