= Erika Matsuo =

Japanese violinist (born 1984)

Erika Matsuo 松尾 依里佳
- Born: January 14, 1984 (age 41); Katano, Osaka, Japan
- Occupation: Violinist
- Years active: 2004–present
- Website: www.erika-m.jp

Erika Matsuo (松尾 依里佳, Matsuo Erika, born January 14, 1984, in Katano, Osaka, Japan) is a Japanese violinist.

== Discography ==
=== Mini-albums ===
Year	Title	Notes
2008	First Gate	

=== Max singles ===
Year	Title	Notes
2012	"Unlimited"	

=== Distribution ===
Year	Title	Notes
2013	"Unlimited View"	
2013	"Color of Still-Inori"	
2013	"Kyoto-on Kei"	
2013	"Twilight View"	

== Filmography ==
=== TV series ===
NHK General TV

Year	Title	Notes
2009	Jitō Quiz Socrates no Jinji	
2009	Art Entertainment Meikyū Bijutsukan	

Nippon TV

Year	Title	Notes
2009	The! Sekai Gyōten News	
2009	Ōatari! Quiz Dream Gakuen Takarakuji Present Special	
2009	Hikari Ota's If I Were Prime Minister... Secretary Tanaka	
2009	Dancing Sanma Palace	
2015	The Most Useful School in the World	

Fuji Television

Year	Title	Notes
2006	Nodame Cantabile	
2008	Kin Mirai Yohō Tsugikuru	
2008	Quiz $ Millionaire	
2008	Nekketsu! Heisei Kyōiku Gakuin	Occasional appearances
2009	Nep League	
2009	Quiz! Hexagon II	
2011	Hei!Say!A Board of Education	

TV Asahi

Year	Title	Notes
2008	Zatsugaku King	
2008	Quiz Present Variety Q-sama !!	Occasional appearances
2008	Daitan Map	Occasional appearances
2009	Time Shock	
2012	Cream Quiz Miracle 9	Contestant

Mainichi Broadcasting System

Year	Title	Notes
2015	Akashiya TV	

Asahi Broadcasting Corporation

Year	Title	Notes	Ref.
2010	Knight Scoop	Third generation secretary	
2011	National Cultural Festival		
2015	Cast	Monday commentator	

Kyoto Broadcasting System, KTV Kyoto Channel

Year	Title	Notes
2009	Kyoto! Chacha Cha tsu	

=== Radio series ===
FM-Kyoto

Year	Title	Notes
2008	Route 894	

Tokyo FM

Year	Title	Notes
2008	Tapestry	
2008	Chronos	
