= Hisao Niura =

Zainichi Korean baseball player (born 1951)

Hisao Niura 新浦 壽夫
- Pitcher
- Born: Kim Il-young; May 11, 1951 (age 75); Setagaya, Tokyo, Japan
- Batted: Left Threw: Left

Professional debut
- NPB: April 13, 1971, for the Yomiuri Giants
- KBO: 1984, for the Samsung Lions

Last appearance
- KBO: 1986, for the Samsung Lions
- NPB: September 23, 1992, for the Yakult Swallows

NPB statistics
- Win–loss record: 116–123
- ERA: 3.45
- Saves: 39
- Strikeouts: 1,706

KBO statistics
- Win–loss record: 54–20
- ERA: 2.53
- Strikeouts: 322
- Stats at Baseball Reference

Teams
- Yomiuri Giants (1971–1983); Samsung Lions (1984–1986); Yokohama Taiyō Whales (1987–1991); Fukuoka Daiei Hawks (1992); Yakult Swallows (1992)

Career highlights and awards
- NPB: 4× Japan Series champion (1971, 1972, 1973, 1981); 5× All-Star (1976, 1978, 1979, 1987, 1988); 2× Central League ERA champion (1977, 1978); 1× Central League Best Nine Award (1978); Fireman of the Year (1978); Middle Reliever of the Year (1978); Central League strikeout leader (1979); Comeback Player of the Year Award (1987); KBO: KBO League champion (1985)

- Hisao Niura
- Hangul: 김일융
- Hanja: 金日融
- RR: Gim Ilyung
- MR: Kim Iryung

Hisao Niura, also known as Kim Il-young (Korean: 김일융; born May 11, 1951), is a Japanese former professional baseball pitcher who played Nippon Professional Baseball in Japan and KBO League baseball in South Korea. Over a 22-season career, he was a five-time champion, four times with the Yomiuri Giants and once with the Samsung Lions. He was a two-time ERA champion of Japan's Central League. A workhorse during much of his career, he had success as both a starter and a reliever.

Although born in Japan, Niura is of Korean descent, part of the Zainichi community.

== Career ==
=== NPB ===
Niura was born in Japan and attended Shizuoka Shogyo High School, but technically held Korean citizenship. As a 17-year-old in the summer of 1968, Niura announced his intention to drop out of high school and turn pro, but as a "foreign player" was ruled ineligible even though he had attended a Japanese high school. Niura then became the subject of intense bidding in excess of the draft-restricted contract bonus of ¥1,000,000, with six NPB teams and even some Major League Baseball teams involved. As a result, Niura joined the Yomiuri Giants outside of the draft. This became a key case to change the ruling on NPB draft eligibility from "those with Japanese citizenship" to "those that are registered with Japanese schools."

Niura made it to the top level of NPB in 1971, and ended up pitching for the Yomiuri Giants for 13 seasons. The Giants won the Japan Series championship each of Niura's first three years in the league (this was during the Giants' record nine straight championships), although he did not pitch in any Series games.

Niura's best stretch in NPB was from 1976 to 1979, when he won a total of 52 games, with a winning percentage of .619, with 32 complete games. Niura appeared in 50 games in 1976, half as a starter and half as a reliever. He tied for the league lead in shutouts with three, and finished third in ERA behind Takamasa Suzuki and Shigeru Kobayashi. That year he made his first Central League All-Star team. He finally appeared in a Japan Series game, pitching two innings in Game Two (Yomiuri ended up losing in seven games to the Hankyu Braves).

In 1977, his 2.32 ERA was the best in the Central League; his nine saves also were tied for the league lead. Hisao again pitched in the Japan Series (again against the Braves), appearing in Games One, Two, and Four, and taking the loss in the clincher Game Five.

Niura won 15 games and saved 15 more in 1978, both career highs; his 63 appearances led the Central League. He repeated as ERA champion with a 2.81 mark, made his second All-Star team, won both Fireman of the Year and Middle Reliever of the Year, and was given a Best Nine Award as the Central League's best pitcher. In 1979 Niura went 15–11 with 5 saves, a 3.43 ERA and 223 strikeouts in 236-1/3 innings, leading the Central League in strikeouts. He made his third All-Star team.

Elbow problems in the period 1980 to 1983 reduced his workload.

=== KBO ===
Niura transitioned to the Samsung Lions of the nascent KBO League in 1984, playing under his Korean name Kim Il-young. He was 16–10 with a 2.27 ERA in 1984. In 1985 Niura/Kim went 25-6 for the Lions, with a 2.79 ERA and 11 complete games to help lead the Lions to the KBO League championship. (Under the format the league played during that era, because the Lions finished first in both half-seasons, no Korean Series was played and Samsung was declared champion outright.) Kim won ten games in his first 12 starts that year, a KBO record for the fastest time to ten wins. Kim's 25 wins that year are still good for third-place in KBO single-season victories; he was beaten out for the 1985 KBO League Golden Glove Award by his teammate Kim Si-jin, who also won 25 games. He continued his KBO success in 1986, going 13–4 with a 2.53 ERA.

Niura was diagnosed with diabetes in 1986; that combined with the language barrier (Niura did not speak Korean), led to him returning to Japan.

Niura's three years in the KBO resulted in a 54–20 record (a .730 winning percentage), a 2.53 ERA, 32 complete games, and 8 shutouts.

=== NPB (second stint) ===
Niura returned to NPB in 1987, having added a screwball and changeup to his pitching repertoire, which previously had been limited to a fastball and a curveball. Now playing for the Yokohama Taiyō Whales, Niura ended up winning 11 games in 1987, along with 7 complete games and 4 shutouts, and won the Comeback Player of the Year Award (an honor he shared with Tōru Sugiura of the Yakult Swallows). He made his fourth All-Star team in 1987 and his fifth (and final) one in 1988.

On August 4, 1989, he shut out his old team Yomiuri on 13 hits, the most hits ever allowed by an NPB pitcher in a shutout.

Niura's 22-season career ended in 1992, playing with the Yakult Swallows.
