= Kazuyuki Shirai =

Japanese baseball player and coach (born 1961)

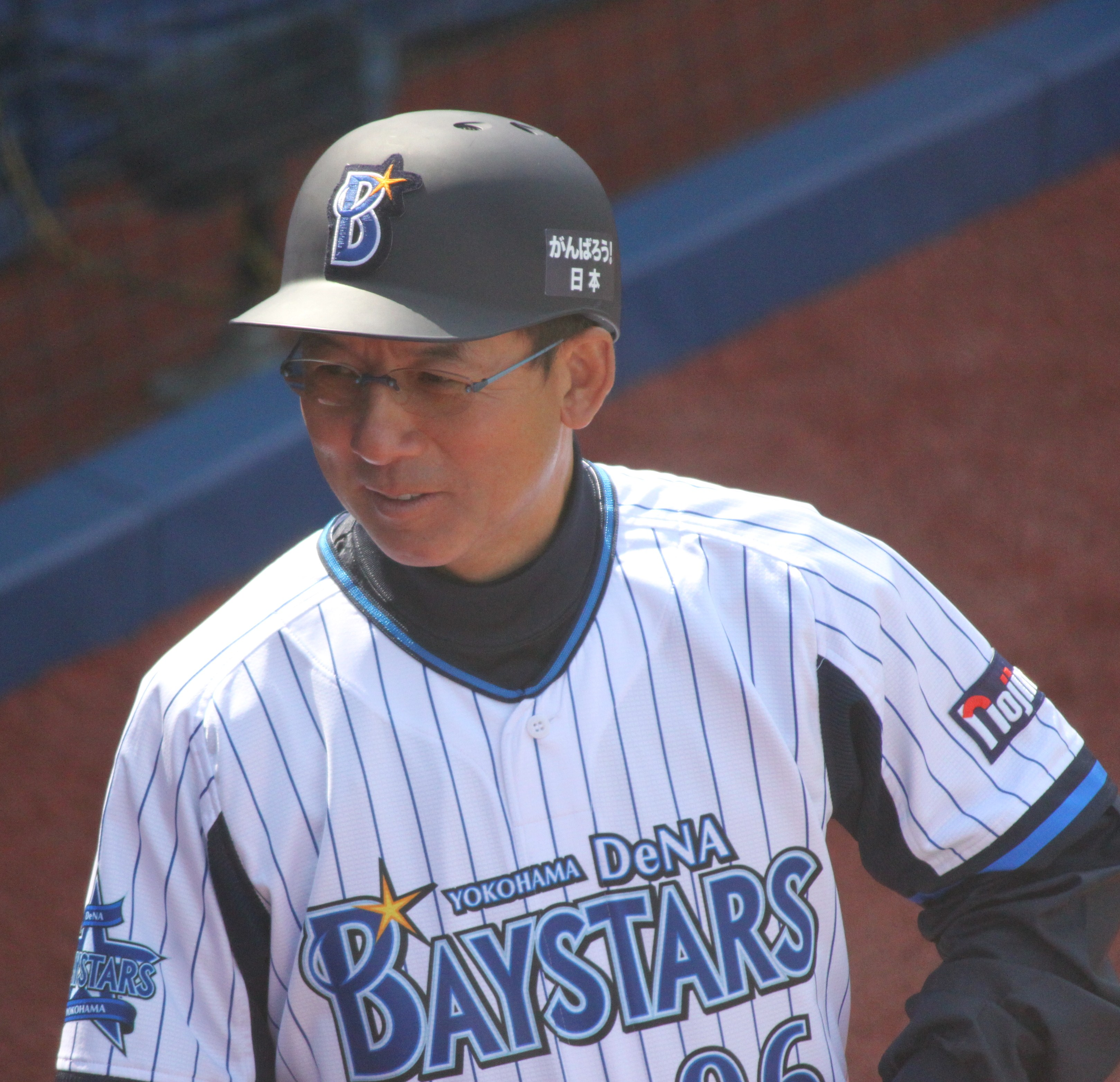

Japan national baseball team – No. 90
- Infielder / Coach
- Born: June 7, 1961; Sanuki, Kagawa, Japan
- Batted: Both Threw: Right

NPB debut
- March 313, 1984, for the Nippon-Ham Fighters

Last appearance
- May 14, 1996, for the Orix BlueWave

NPB statistics
- Batting average: .246
- Hits: 889
- Home runs: 49
- Runs batted in: 334
- Stolen base: 168

Teams
- As player: Nippon-Ham Fighters (1984–1995); Orix BlueWave (1996); As manager/coach: New York Yankees (1997); Nippon-Ham Fighters/Hokkaido Nippon-Ham Fighters (2000–2007, 2014–2017); Kansas City Royals (2008); Yokohama BayStars/Yokohama DeNA BayStars (2011–2012)

Career highlights and awards
- Pacific League Best Nine Award (1987); Pacific League Golden Glove Award (1987); Comeback Player of the Year (1991); 2× NPB All-Star (1987, 1991)
- Last updated on: January 9, 2023

Kazuyuki Shirai (白井 一幸, Shirai Kazuyuki; born June 7, 1961) is a Japanese former Nippon Professional Baseball infielder.
