= Sadaaki Yoshimura =

Japanese baseball player and coach (born 1963)

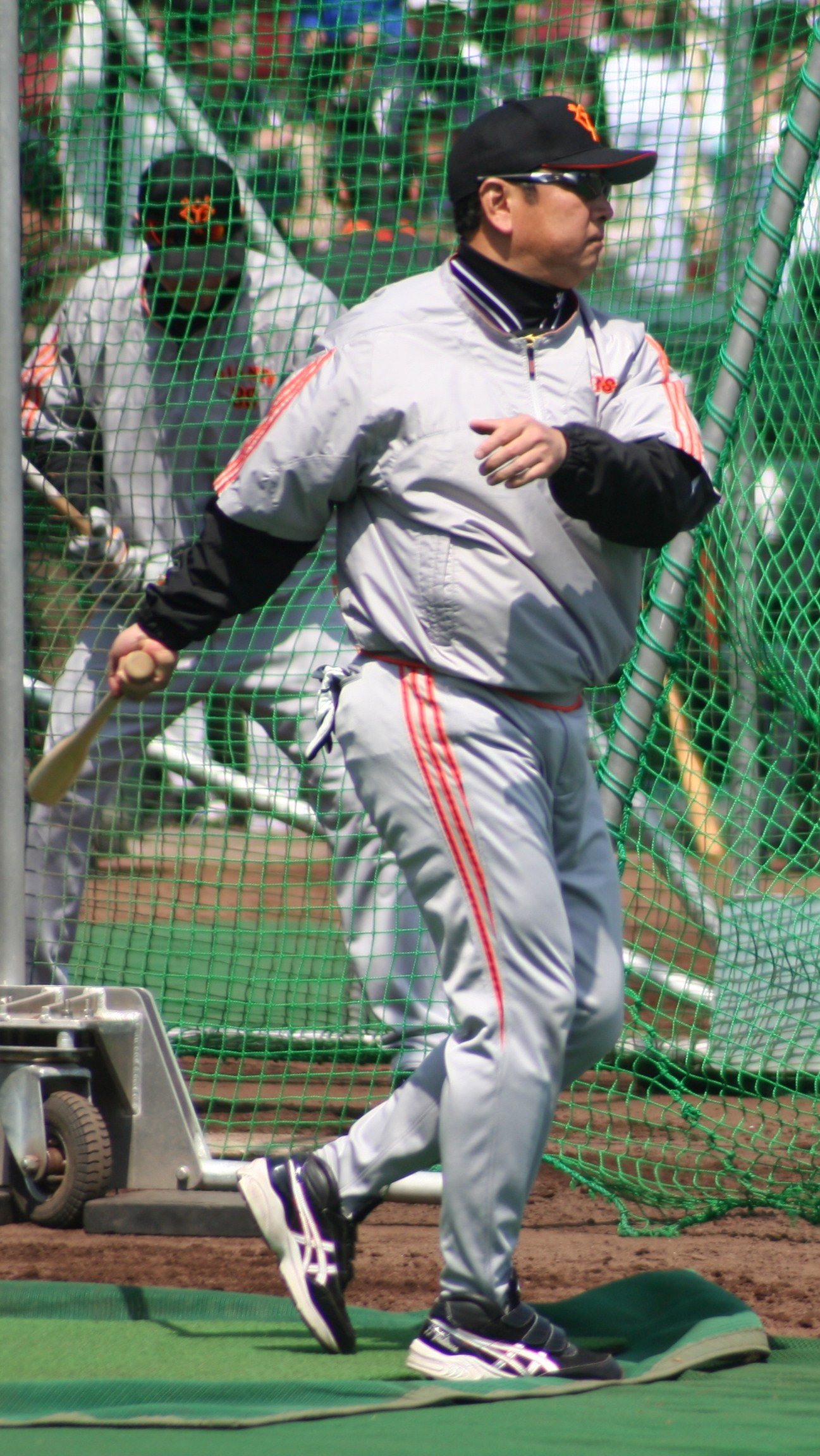
- Outfielder / Coach
- Born: April 27, 1963 (age 62); Gose, Nara, Japan
- Batted: Left Threw: Left

NPB debut
- July 20, 1982, for the Yomiuri Giants

Last NPB appearance
- October 3, 1998, for the Yomiuri Giants

NPB statistics (through 1998)
- Batting average: .296
- Home runs: 149
- Hits: 964
- Stats at Baseball Reference

Teams
- As player: Yomiuri Giants (1982–1998); As coach: Yomiuri Giants (2002–2003, 2006–2011, 2018–2021)

Career highlights and awards
- 2× Best Nine Award (1986-1987); 1× Nippon Professional Baseball Comeback Player of the Year Award (1990); 4× NPB All-Star (1986-1987, 1991, 1993); 1× NPB All-Star Game MVP (1986 Game 3)

Sadaaki Yoshimura (吉村 禎章, Yoshimura Sadaaki; born April 27, 1963 in Gose, Nara, Japan) is a professional Japanese baseball player.
