= Takashi Tachikawa =

Japanese baseball player

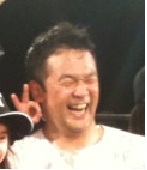
- Takashi Tachikawa
- Outfielder
- Born: October 7, 1975 (age 50); Shinjuku, Tokyo, Japan
- Batted: Right Threw: Right

debut
- 1996, for the Chiba Lotte Marines

Last appearance
- 2004, for the Hanshin Tigers

Career statistics
- Batting average: .236
- Home runs: 28
- Runs batted in: 117
- Stats at Baseball Reference

Teams
- Chiba Lotte Marines (1996–2004); Hanshin Tigers (2004)

Takashi Tachikawa (立川 隆史, Tachikawa Takashi; born October 7, 1975 in Shinjuku, Tokyo) is a Japanese former baseball outfielder in Nippon Professional Baseball. He played for the Chiba Lotte Marines (1996–2004) and the Hanshin Tigers (2004).

Prior to playing professionally, he attended Takudai Koryo High School and before playing in NPB, he played for the Visalia Oaks of the California League in 1995, hitting .176 in 47 games. The Oaks were a Single-A affiliate of Major League Baseball's California Angels.

Tachikawa joined the Marines in 1996, hitting .172 in 29 at-bats. The following year, he hit .274 (a career-high) with a career-high seven home runs, six stolen bases and .401 slugging percentage in 252 at-bats and in 1998, he hit .216 in 153 ABs, setting a career-high in triples with three. He hit .136 in 22 at-bats in 1999 and in 2000, he hit .244 in 160 at-bats. After hitting .250 in 92 at-bats in 2001 (with a career-high .361 on-base percentage and .742 OPS), Tachikawa hit .238 in 269 ABs in 2002. He had the most playing time of his career in 2003, hitting .240, setting career highs in RBI (31), total bases (111), games played (94), at-bats (292), plate appearances (332), runs (34), hits (70), doubles (14), walks (29) and strikeouts (72). He tied previously set career highs in home runs and triples. He began 2004, with the Marines, but hit only .094 in 32 at-bats. The Marines cut ties with him and he finished out the year with Hanshin, hitting .171 in 35 ABs there. In total, he hit .136 in 67 at-bats his final campaign.

Overall, Tachikawa hit .236 with 28 home runs, 117 RBI and 315 hits in 530 games over nine seasons.
