= Osaka Kintetsu Buffaloes =

Former Japanese professional baseball team, active in the Pacific League until 2004

- Dissolved and merged with the Orix BlueWave in 2004 to create the Orix Buffaloes

Logo	Cap insignia

Information
- League: Nippon Professional Baseball Pacific League (1950–2004)
- Location: Nishi-ku, Osaka, Osaka, Japan
- Ballpark: Osaka Dome
- Founded: November 26, 1949; 76 years ago
- Folded: December 1, 2004; 21 years ago
- Nickname(s): Mogyu (猛牛, raging bull)
- Japan Series championships: 0
- Pacific League championships: 4 (1979, 1980, 1989, 2001)
- Playoff berths: 3 (1975, 1979, 1980)
- Former name: Osaka Kintetsu Buffaloes (1999-2004); Kintetsu Buffaloes (1962–1998); Kintetsu Buffalo (1959–1961); Kintetsu Pearls (1949–1958)
- Former ballparks: Osaka Dome (1997–2004); Fujiidera Stadium (1984–1996); Nippon Life Stadium (1958–1983); Osaka Stadium (1951–1957); Fujiidera Stadium (1950)
- Colors: Red, Black, White
- Mascot: Buffie and Falulu
- Retired numbers: 1
- Management: Kintetsu Railway Co., Ltd.

The Osaka Kintetsu Buffaloes (大阪近鉄バファローズ, Ōsaka Kintetsu Bafarōzu) were a Nippon Professional Baseball (NPB) team based in Osaka, Japan, which was in the Pacific League. In 2005 the team was merged with the Orix BlueWave to become the team now known as the Orix Buffaloes. The team played in Fujiidera Stadium, and later in Osaka Dome.

Although the team won four Pacific League championships, they lost all four Japan Series in which they played. The team's batting lineup was known as Itemae Dasen (いてまえ打線).

== Logo design ==
A stylized buffalo's head with angry-looking red eyes (designed by Okamoto Taro), or "Buffaloes" in red script, outlined with white. Another logo featured the "Buffaloes" in red script, while also featuring Buffie, the Buffaloes mascot.

== Franchise history ==
The team was founded in 1949 and began play in 1950 in the newly organized NPB. Owned by Kinki Nippon Railway Co. (later known as Kintetsu Railway), the franchise was known as the Kintetsu Pearls from 1950 to 1958, Kintetsu Buffalo from 1959 to 1961, the Kintetsu Buffaloes from 1962 to 1998, and the Osaka Kintetsu Buffaloes from 1999 to 2004. In 1961, the Buffaloes lost 103 games that year. As of 2022, it is NPB's only 100 loss season.

The Kintetsu Buffalo were among the first Japanese teams to sign American players. They signed former major league pitcher Glenn Mickens and catcher Ron Bottler for the 1959 season. Mickens had played for the Brooklyn Dodgers in 1953 and Bottler had been a career minor league catcher in the United States. Mickens played for five years in Japan, compiling a record of 45–53 with a 2.54 ERA. Bottler played for the Buffalo for three seasons, gradually converting from catcher to starting pitcher, where he had more success.

It took 30 years for the franchise to win its first Pacific League title, in 1979, but it lost the Japan Series to the Hiroshima Toyo Carp 4-games-to-3. The Buffaloes made it back to the Japan Series in 1980, but again lost to Hiroshima by the same margin.

The franchise's most notable player was pitcher Keishi Suzuki, who played for the Buffaloes from 1966 to 1985, compiling a won-loss record of 317–238, a 3.11 ERA, and 3,061 strikeouts. He was elected to the Japanese Baseball Hall of Fame in 2002.

In 1988, the Buffaloes were so close to making the Japan Series, after tying a second game in a double-header against the Lotte Orions. In order for Kintetsu to win the pennant, they had to win both games.

They would make the Japan Series the following year, but just barely, after being .001 winning percentage higher than the second place Orix Braves, but lost to the Giants in the first reverse sweep since the 1958 Japan Series.

American outfielder Ralph Bryant starred for the Buffaloes from 1988 to 1995, in the process becoming one of the best left-handed power hitters in Japanese baseball history. Bryant had his best season in 1989, where his 49 home runs led the Buffaloes to their third Pacific League championship. He won the season MVP award that year, and also tied Sadaharu Oh's career record for hitting three home runs in a game five times. Bryant also struck out countless times, and holds the top four spots on the single-season strikeout records in Nippon Professional Baseball.

Pitcher Hideo Nomo starred for the Buffaloes from 1990 to 1994 before he exercised a loophole in his contract and "retired," allowing him to sign with MLB's Los Angeles Dodgers. The subsequent wave of players moving to Major League Baseball has become a fixture of Japanese professional baseball. To combat this, MLB and NPB agreed to make the posting system, which allowed players in NPB to "post" and allowed them to move to MLB. Without Nomo, the Buffaloes struggled in pitching, even as they carried one of NPB's most dominant offenses at the time.

In 2000, the Buffaloes signed Mexican pitcher Narciso Elvira. While he had terrible pitching, he was noted for being the only Mexican player in NPB history as of 2022 to throw a no-hitter, and only allowing 4 walks. He was cut 6 games into the Buffaloes' 2001 Pacific League championship season, and then signed with the Samsung Lions of the KBO League and won the 2002 Korean Series with them.

Tuffy Rhodes played for the Buffaloes for eight seasons from 1996 to 2003, hitting 288 home runs over that span. In the 2001 season, he hit his 55th homer to tie Sadaharu Oh's Japanese League single season home run record, set in 1964. For the rest of the season, opposing pitchers intentionally walked Rhodes to prevent him from breaking Oh's record. Rhodes also played in tandem with Norihiro Nakamura, who also hit 46 home runs that same season. Together, they became a deadly hitting tandem, and the Buffaloes had one of the most dominant offenses in the league.

Despite the efforts of Rhodes and Nakamura, the Buffaloes could still not win the Japan Series, as they lost to the Tokyo Yakult Swallows in 5 games in the 2001 Japan Series. The Buffaloes are the second team to make the Japan Series but never win it, the first being the short lived Shochiku Robins, who only made the Japan Series in NPB's inaugural season, losing to the Mainichi Orions (now Chiba Lotte Marines) before folding at the end of the following season and being merged with the Taiyo Whales (now Yokohama DeNA BayStars).

=== Sale and merger ===
In 2004 the team was sold to the Orix Group, the owner of the Orix BlueWave baseball team. The new owner then announced that the financially challenged Buffaloes and BlueWave would be merged into one team, called the Orix Buffaloes, before the start of the 2005 NPB season. At the time, Kintetsu Railway, the Buffaloes' owners, were in ¥1.3 trillion (or $11.2 billion today) in debt. This caused Buffaloes legend Tuffy Rhodes to sign with the Yomiuri Giants as Kintetsu was not able to strike up the multi year deal he wanted.

The proposed merger of the teams led to the biggest crisis in the traditional two-league structure in NPB and finally caused the first baseball player strike in Japan. The dispute officially ended after the two groups reached consensus on September 23, 2004. As part of the agreement, the Tohoku Rakuten Golden Eagles were newly created (at a reduced "entry fee") to keep the former six-team league structure. Other agreements included the leagues adopting interleague play to help the Pacific League gain exposure by playing the more popular Central league teams. All these changes took place before the 2005 season.

The opposition of the merger caused Buffaloes players to refuse to play for the newly merged team. In particular, Norihiro Nakamura decided to jump to MLB and played in the Los Angeles Dodgers minor league system, while Hisashi Iwakuma and Koichi Isobe, despite being protected by the Orix Buffaloes during the dispersal draft, immediately demanded for trades to the Eagles. Eventually, the Buffaloes relucted, and traded the two to the Eagles for cash.

== Players of note ==
=== Former players ===
==== Japanese ====
- Toshiya Adachi (安達 俊也)
- Motoyuki Akahori (赤堀 元之)
- Hiromasa Arai (新井 宏昌)
- Hideyuki Awano (阿波野 秀幸)
- Masahiro Doi (土井 正博)
- Takashi Imoto (井本 隆)
- Hiroo Ishii (石井 浩郎)
- Koichi Isobe (磯部 公一)
- Hisashi Iwakuma (岩隈 久志)
- Ken Kadokura (門倉 健)
- Yoshiaki Kanemura (金村 義明)
- Hideo Koike (小池 秀雄)
- Tetsuya Matoyama (的山 哲也)
- Eiji Mizuguchi (水口 栄二)
- Norihiro Nakamura (中村 紀洋)
- Masataka Nashida (梨田 昌孝)
- Hideo Nomo (野茂 英雄)
- Naoyuki Ohmura (大村 直之)
- Daijiro Oishi (大石 大二郎)
- Kazuyoshi Ono (小野 和義)
- Koji Ota (太田 幸司)
- Akinori Otsuka (大塚 晶則)
- Tomotaka Sakaguchi (坂口 智隆)
- Kyosuke Sasaki (佐々木 恭介)
- Osamu Sasaki (佐々木 修)
- Junzo Sekine (関根 潤三)
- Keishi Suzuki (鈴木 啓示)
- Takahisa Suzuki (鈴木 貴久)
- Hiroshi Takamura (高村 祐)
- Shintaro Yamasaki (山崎 慎太郎)
- Masato Yoshii (吉井 理人)
- Yuji Yoshioka (吉岡 雄二)

==== Foreign players ====
- Andy Abad
- Kyle Abbott
- Mike Andrews
- Luis Aquino
- Chris Arnold
- Gene Bacque
- Sean Bergman
- Billy Bean
- Buddy Bradford
- Ralph Bryant
- Ozzie Canseco
- Phil Clark
- Alvin Davis
- Dick Davis
- Pat Dodson
- Chris Donnels with register name "C.D"
- Narciso Elvira
- Chuck Essegian
- Freddy García
- Shawn Gilbert
- Jim Gentile
- David Green
- Ike Hampton
- Mike Johnson
- Terry Lee
- Phil Leftwich
- Charlie Manuel
- Glenn Mickens
- Bob Milacki
- Don Money
- Ben Oglivie
- Dennis Powell
- Jim Qualls
- R. J. Reynolds
- Karl "Tuffy" Rhodes
- Bombo Rivera
- Germán Rivera
- Dave Roberts
- Johnny Ruffin
- Brian Shouse
- Lee Stevens
- Jim Traber
- Carlos Valdez
- Nigel Wilson
- Bob Wolcott
- Larry Wolfe

=== Award winners ===
Pacific League Most Valuable Player Award

- Charlie Manuel (1979)
- Ralph Bryant (1989)
- Hideo Nomo (1990)
- Tuffy Rhodes (2001)

Eiji Sawamura Award

- Hideo Nomo (1990)

Pacific League Rookie of the Year

- Toshiaki Tokuhisa (1961)
- Daijiro Oishi (1982)
- Hideyuki Awano (1987)
- Hideo Nomo (1990)
- Hiroshi Takamura (1992)

Nippon Professional Baseball Comeback Player of the Year Award

- Kazuyoshi Ono (1991)
- Koki Morita (2001)

== Retired numbers ==
- 1 (Japan) Keishi Suzuki (鈴木 啓示)

== Managers ==
- (Japan) Shozo Fujita (1950-1952)
- (Japan) Takeo Akuta (1953-1957)
- (Japan) Hisayuki Kato (1958)
- (Japan) Shigeru Chiba (1959-1961)
- (Japan) Kaoru Betto (1962-1964)
- (Japan) Yoshiyuki Iwamoto (1965-1966)
- (Japan) Akitoshi Kodama (1967)
- (Japan) Osamu Mihara (1968-1970)
- (Japan) Takashi Iwamoto (1971-1973)
- (Japan) Yukio Nishimoto (1974-1981)
- (Japan) Seiji Sekiguchi (1982-1983)
- (Japan) Isami Okamoto (1984-1987)
- (Japan) Akira Ohgi (1988-1992)
- (Japan) Keishi Suzuki (1993-1995)
- (Japan) Kyosuke Sasaki (1996-1999)
- (Japan) Masataka Nashida (2000-2004)

== Season-by-season records ==
Central League Pennant
(1950–2004)

Season	League	Finish	Wins	Losses	Ties	Win%	GB	Playoffs	Awards
Kintetsu Pearls
1950	Pacific	7th	44	72	4	.379	37.5		
1951	Pacific	7th	37	56	5	.398	33.5		
1952	Pacific	7th	30	78	0	.278	40		
1953	Pacific	7th	48	69	3	.410	22		
1954	Pacific	4th	74	63	3	.540	16		
1955	Pacific	5th	60	80	2	.429	39		
1956	Pacific	5th	68	82	4	.455	29.5		
1957	Pacific	6th	44	82	6	.356	38.5		
Kintetsu Buffalo
1958	Pacific	6th	29	97	4	.238	49.5		
1959	Pacific	6th	39	91	3	.300	49		
1960	Pacific	6th	43	87	1	.331	39		Akitoshi Kodama (Best Nine Award)
1961	Pacific	6th	36	103	1	.261	51.5		
Kintetsu Buffaloes
1962	Pacific	6th	57	73	1	.438	21		Jack Bloomfield (Best Nine Award); Akitoshi Kodama (Best Nine Award)
1963	Pacific	4th	74	73	3	.503	12.5		Jack Bloomfield (Best Nine Award); Akitoshi Kodama (Best Nine Award)
1964	Pacific	6th	55	91	4	.377	28.5		Akitoshi Kodama (Best Nine Award)
1965	Pacific	6th	46	92	2	.333	42.5		Takashi Takagi (Best Nine Award); Akitoshi Kodama (Best Nine Award)
1966	Pacific	6th	48	62	3	.369	31		
1967	Pacific	6th	59	71	2	.454	16		Masahiro Doi (Best Nine Award)
1968	Pacific	4th	57	73	5	.438	23		Masahiro Doi (Best Nine Award)
1969	Pacific	2nd	73	51	6	.589	2		Keishi Suzuki (Best Nine Award); Youzou Nagafuchi (Best Nine Award)
1970	Pacific	3rd	65	59	6	.524	13.5		
1971	Pacific	3rd	65	60	5	.520	18		
1972	Pacific	2nd	64	60	6	.5161	14		
1973	Pacific	6th/6th	42	83	5	.336			
1974	Pacific	5th/4th	56	66	8	.459			Clarence Jones (Best Nine Award)
1975	Pacific	3rd/1st	71	50	9	.587		Lost Pacific League playoffs (Braves) 3–1	Keishi Suzuki (Best Nine Award); Kyosuke Sasaki (Best Nine Award)
1976	Pacific	5th/4th	57	66	7	.463			
1977	Pacific	3rd/6th	59	61	10	.492			Shigeru Ishiwata (Best Nine Award)
1978	Pacific	2nd	71	46	13	.607			Keishi Suzuki (Best Nine Award); Kyosuke Sasaki (Best Nine Award)
1979	Pacific	1st/2nd	74	45	11	.622		Won Pacific League playoffs (Braves) 3–0; Lost Japan Series (Carp) 4–3	Masataka Nashida (Best Nine Award); Shigeru Ishiwata (Best Nine Award); Shigeru Kurihashi (Best Nine Award); Charlie Manuel (Best Nine Award)
1980	Pacific	2nd/1st	68	54	8	.557		Won Pacific League playoffs (Orions) 3–0; Lost Japan Series (Carp) 4–3	
1981	Pacific	6th/4th	54	72	4	.429			
1982	Pacific	3rd/2nd	63	57	10	.525			
1983	Pacific	4th	52	65	13	.444	29.5		
1984	Pacific	4th	58	61	11	.487	16.5		
1985	Pacific	3rd	63	60	7	.5121	15.5		
1986	Pacific	2nd	66	52	12	.559	2.5		
1987	Pacific	6th	52	69	9	.430	21.5		
1988	Pacific	2nd	74	52	4	.587	0.0		
1989	Pacific	1st	71	54	5	.568	–	Lost Japan Series (Giants) 4-3	
1990	Pacific	3rd	67	60	3	.528	14.5		
1991	Pacific	2nd	77	48	5	.616	4.5		
1992	Pacific	2nd	74	50	6	.597	4.5		
1993	Pacific	4th	66	59	5	.528	7		
1994	Pacific	3rd	68	59	3	.5354	7.5		
1995	Pacific	6th	49	78	3	.386	32		
1996	Pacific	4th	62	67	1	.481	14.5		
1997	Pacific	3rd	68	63	4	.519	7.5		
1998	Pacific	5th	66	67	2	.496	5		
Osaka Kintetsu Buffaloes
1999	Pacific	6th	54	77	4	.412	23.5		Norihiro Nakamura (Best Nine Award); Phil Clark (Best Nine Award); Tuffy Rhodes (Best Nine Award)
2000	Pacific	6th	58	75	2	.436	15.0		Norihiro Nakamura (Best Nine Award)
2001	Pacific	1st	78	60	2	.565	–	Lost Japan Series (Swallows) 4–1	Norihiro Nakamura (Best Nine Award); Koichi Isobe (Best Nine Award); Tuffy Rhodes (Best Nine Award)
2002	Pacific	2nd	73	65	2	.529	16.5		Jeremy Powell (Best Nine Award); Norihiro Nakamura (Best Nine Award); Tuffy Rhodes (Best Nine Award)
2003	Pacific	3rd	74	64	2	.536	8.5		Tuffy Rhodes (Best Nine Award)
2004	Pacific	5th	61	70	2	.466	17.0		Hisashi Iwakuma (Best Nine Award)

== Mascots ==
The Buffaloes had 2 mascots, named Buffie and Falulu (バフィリード and ファルルリーナ). Buffie is a male buffalo and was introduced in 1997. He also appeared on the team logo. Falulu is a female buffalo. Buffie's jersey number is 100 while Falulu's is 200. They were retired in 2005 after the Buffaloes merged with the then-named Orix BlueWave (present day Orix Buffaloes). Buffie reappeared in a Buffaloes reprint match in 2013. They also had 2 other mascots as part of the same group, named Capelot and Balbarock, with Capelot being a much more child-like character, whilst Balbarock was supposed to resemble the club's cap logo. Both were retired in 2000. All 4 were designed by Hanna-Barbera Productions, and their backstory was that they lived in a fantasy world of dreams and adventures named "Buffalo Valley", as described in the club's 1997 supporters' handbook. However, after the merger, only Buffie's copyright trademark was transferred to Orix Corporation.

Before they were introduced, the team's mascot was a human character named Buffer (バッファくん), who served as the team mascot from 1976 to 1996. Logos of him usually depicted him holding a baseball bat and a ball, wearing the Buffaloes cap, raising one leg, whilst wearing Asics spiked shoes. However, a secondary logo primarily used by the team only had him holding a bat and ball. His jersey number was 100. He was designed by Yoshio Shirakawa. He was retired in 1997 following the Buffaloes' major logo and jersey overhaul, coinciding with their move to the Osaka Dome.
