= Tetsuya Tani =

Japanese baseball player (born 1985)

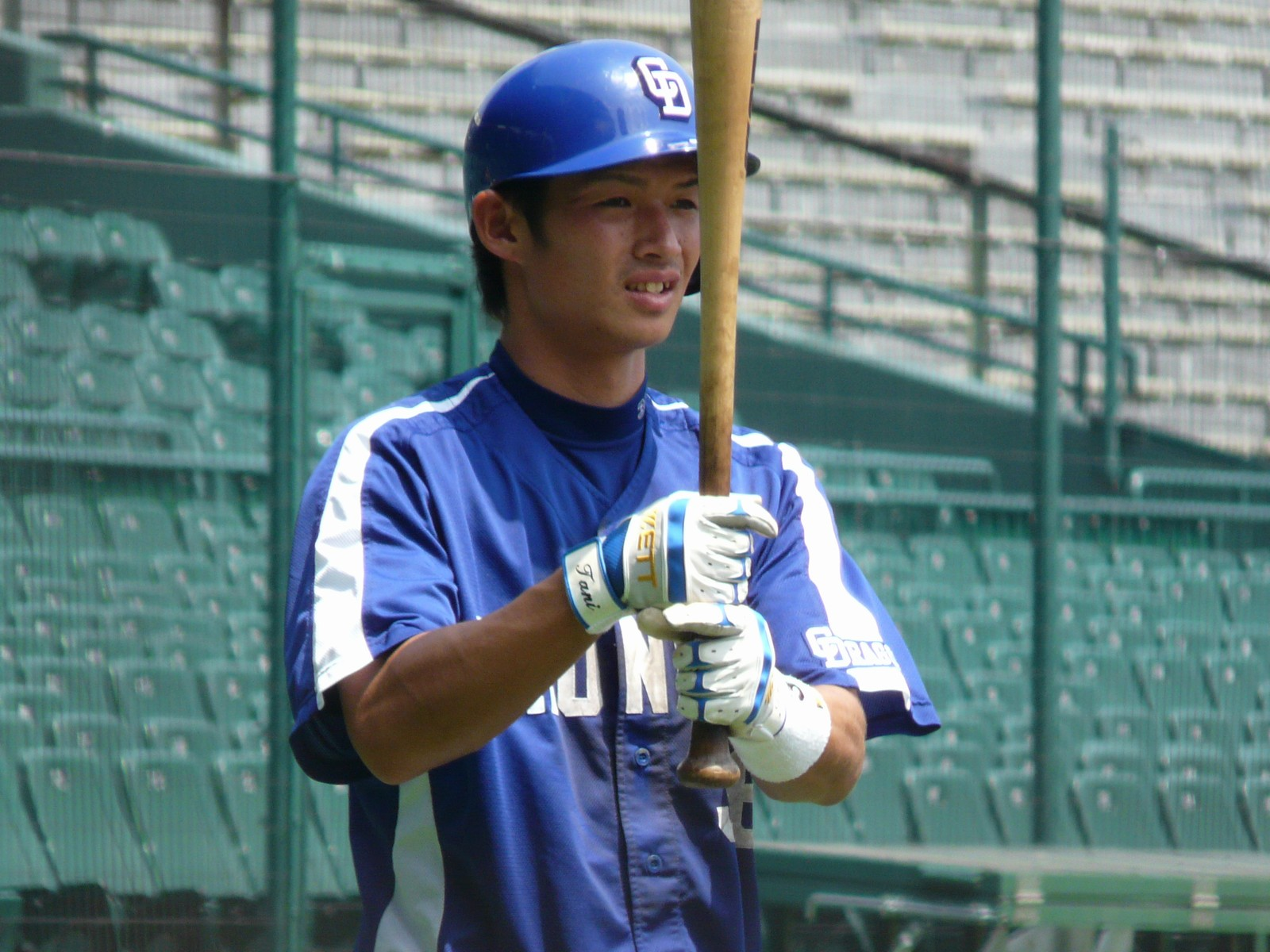

Chunichi Dragons – No. 92
- Infielder/Coach
- Born: July 9, 1985 (age 40)
- Batted: Right Threw: Right

NPB debut
- 2009, for the Chunichi Dragons

Last NPB appearance
- April 4, 2018, for the Chunichi Dragons

NPB statistics (through 2018)
- Batting average: .210
- Home runs: 2
- RBI: 27
- Stats at Baseball Reference

Teams
- As player: Chunichi Dragons (2009–2018); As coach: Chunichi Dragons (2026–present)

Tetsuya Tani (谷 哲也, born July 9, 1985, in Tokushima, Tokushima, Japan) is a Japanese former professional baseball infielder in Japan's Nippon Professional Baseball. He played for the Chunichi Dragons from 2009 to 2018. He is currently a coach.
