= Takuya Takahama =

Japanese baseball player (born 1989)

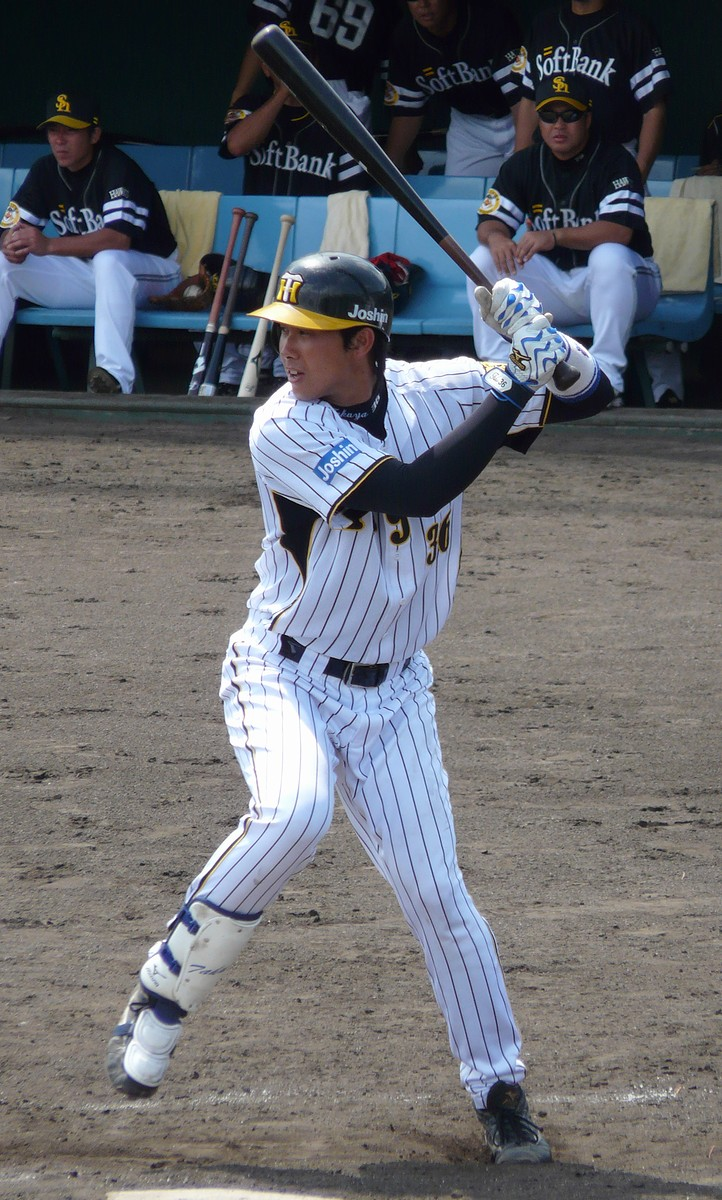
- Takahama with the Hanshin Tigers

Chiba Lotte Marines – No. 61
- Shortstop
- Born: July 6, 1989 (age 36)
- Bats: Left Throws: Right

NPB debut
- May 24, 2011, for the Chiba Lotte Marines

NPB statistics (through 2020 season)
- Batting average: .222
- Home runs: 3
- RBI: 28
- Stats at Baseball Reference

Teams
- Hanshin Tigers (2008–2011); Chiba Lotte Marines (2011–present)

Takuya Takahama (高濱 卓也, Takahama Takuya; born July 6, 1989; in Saga, Saga) is a Japanese professional baseball shortstop for the Chiba Lotte Marines in Japan's Nippon Professional Baseball.
