= Kyosuke Sasaki (baseball) =

Japanese baseball player

- Outfielder / Manager
- Born: December 28, 1949 (age 76); Hikami, Hyōgo, Japan
- Batted: Right Threw: Right

NPB debut
- April 8, 1972, for the Kintetsu Buffaloes

Last appearance
- September 27, 1981, for the Kintetsu Buffaloes

NPB statistics
- Batting average: .283
- Hits: 883
- Home runs: 105
- Runs batted in: 412
- Stolen base: 94
- Stats at Baseball Reference

Teams
- As player: Kintetsu Buffaloes (1972–1982); As manager: Kintetsu Buffaloes / Osaka Kintetsu Buffaloes (1996–1999); Chunichi Dragons (2003); As coach: Kintetsu Buffaloes (1984–1989); Hanshin Tigers (1991–1992); Seibu Lions (2001); Chunichi Dragons (2002–2003)

Career highlights and awards
- 2× Pacific League Best Nine Award (1975, 1978); 1× Pacific League Batting Champion (1978); 2× NPB All-Star (1975, 1978)

Kyosuke Sasaki (佐々木 恭介, Sasaki Kyōsuke; born December 28, 1949) is a Japanese former Nippon Professional Baseball outfielder.
