= Ryūtarō Tsuji =

Japanese baseball player (born 1976)

Ryūtarō Tsuji Ryūtarō
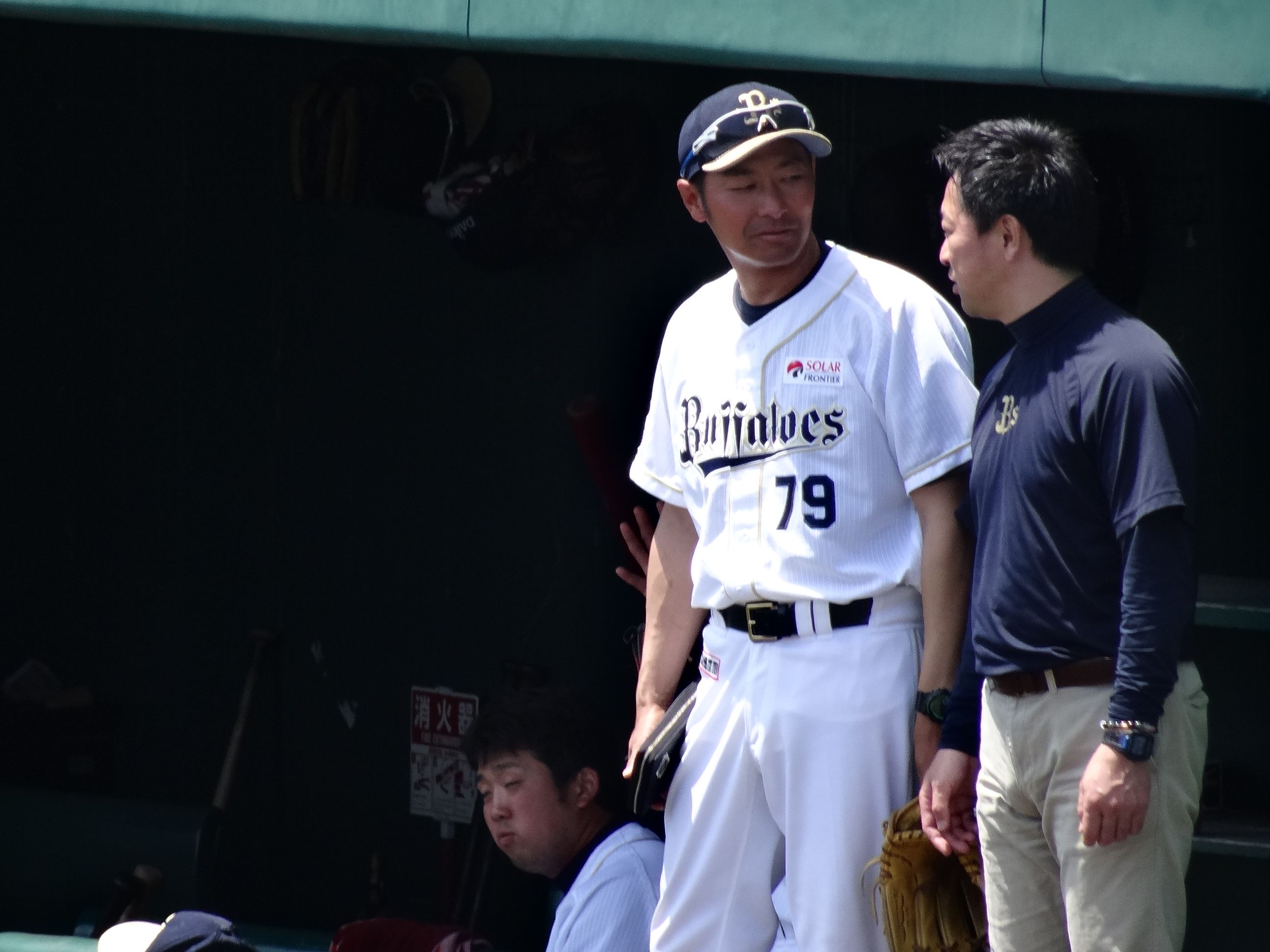

Saitama Seibu Lions – No. 77
- Outfielder / Coach
- Born: June 8, 1976 (age 49); Minoh, Osaka, Japan
- Batted: Left Threw: Right

NPB debut
- June 1, 2002, for the Orix BlueWave

Last NPB appearance
- April 4, 2007, for the Tohoku Rakuten Golden Eagles

NPB statistics
- Batting average: .261
- Hits: 122
- Home runs: 9
- Runs batted in: 44
- Stolen bases: 6
- Stats at Baseball Reference

Teams
- As player: Orix BlueWave (2002–2004); Tohoku Rakuten Golden Eagles (2005–2007); Shinano Grandserows (2008–2014); As coach: Shinano Grandserows (2008–2010, 2013–2014); Orix Buffaloes (2015–2024); Saitama Seibu Lions (2025–)

Ryūtarō Tsuji (辻 竜太郎, Tsuji Ryūtarō; born June 8, 1976) also known as Ryūtarō (竜太郎) is a former professional baseball player from Minoh, Osaka, Japan.
