= Shōji Tōyama =

Japanese baseball player (born 1967)

- Pitcher
- Born: July 21, 1967; Ashikita, Kumamoto, Japan
- Batted: Left Threw: Left

NPB debut
- April 27, 1986, for the Hanshin Tigers

Last appearance
- October 14, 2002, for the Hanshin Tigers

NPB statistics
- Win–loss record: 16–22
- Earned run average: 4.38
- Strikeouts: 283
- Saves: 5
- Stats at Baseball Reference

Teams
- As player: Hanshin Tigers (1986–1990, 1998–2002); Lotte Orions/Chiba Lotte Marines (1991–1997); As coach: Hanshin Tigers (2005–2011)

Career highlights and awards
- Comeback Player of the Year (1999); NPB All-Star (2000)
- Last updated on: 18 January 2026

Shōji Tōyama (遠山 奨志, Tōyama Shōji; born July 21, 1967, in Ashikita, Kumamoto, Japan) is a Japanese former Nippon Professional Baseball pitcher and coach.
