= Cunning (comedy duo) =

Japanese comedy duo

Cunning; Takeyama and Nakashima.

Cunning (カンニング) was a Japanese comedy duo (kombi) from Fukuoka Prefecture. Cunning consisted of the pudgy, short-tempered Takanori Takeyama (竹山隆範), and the rail-thin Tadayuki Nakashima (中島忠幸). Known for his bursts of extreme anger, though said to be much more sedated off-camera, Takeyama is the boke of the unit. The tsukkomi, Nakashima, fell ill with leukemia in 2005 and took indefinite leave from work until his death from pneumonia on December 20, 2006, aged 35.

The name of the duo, cunning, while meaning "sly" or "clever" in English, refers to the act of cheating on a test in Japanese.

== History ==
The two met as classmates in elementary school, and began attending Yoshimoto's New Star Creation school together in 1992. They both began performing in Fukuoka under Yoshimoto with Takeyama wearing a red tuxedo and Nakashima wearing a blue one. Success didn't find them easily at first and they fell heavily into debt; the duo even broke up for a year. After reforming, they starting working under Sun Music Production and after managing to gain a little recognition, their occasional TV appearances elicited a positive response; they were even compared to the famous performer Beat Takeshi and the already popular kombi The Tunnels. They rode with the owarai boom in 2004 until it was revealed that Nakashima had leukemia the following year.

Takeyama continued to perform as "Cunning Takeyama" while his partner was away from television. He remains a popular variety show talent and is probably one of the most famous among Japanese comedians for his kire, or sharp temper.

On December 20, 2006, Nakashima died. Takeyama held a press conference the following day, describing himself with Nakashima as having been as close as a married couple. Takeyama announced he would continue to appear on television as "Cunning Takeyama".

Takeyama portrayed Kenichi Saitou in the 2010 live-action adaptation of BECK.
