= Hitoshi Taneda =

Japanese baseball player (born 1971)

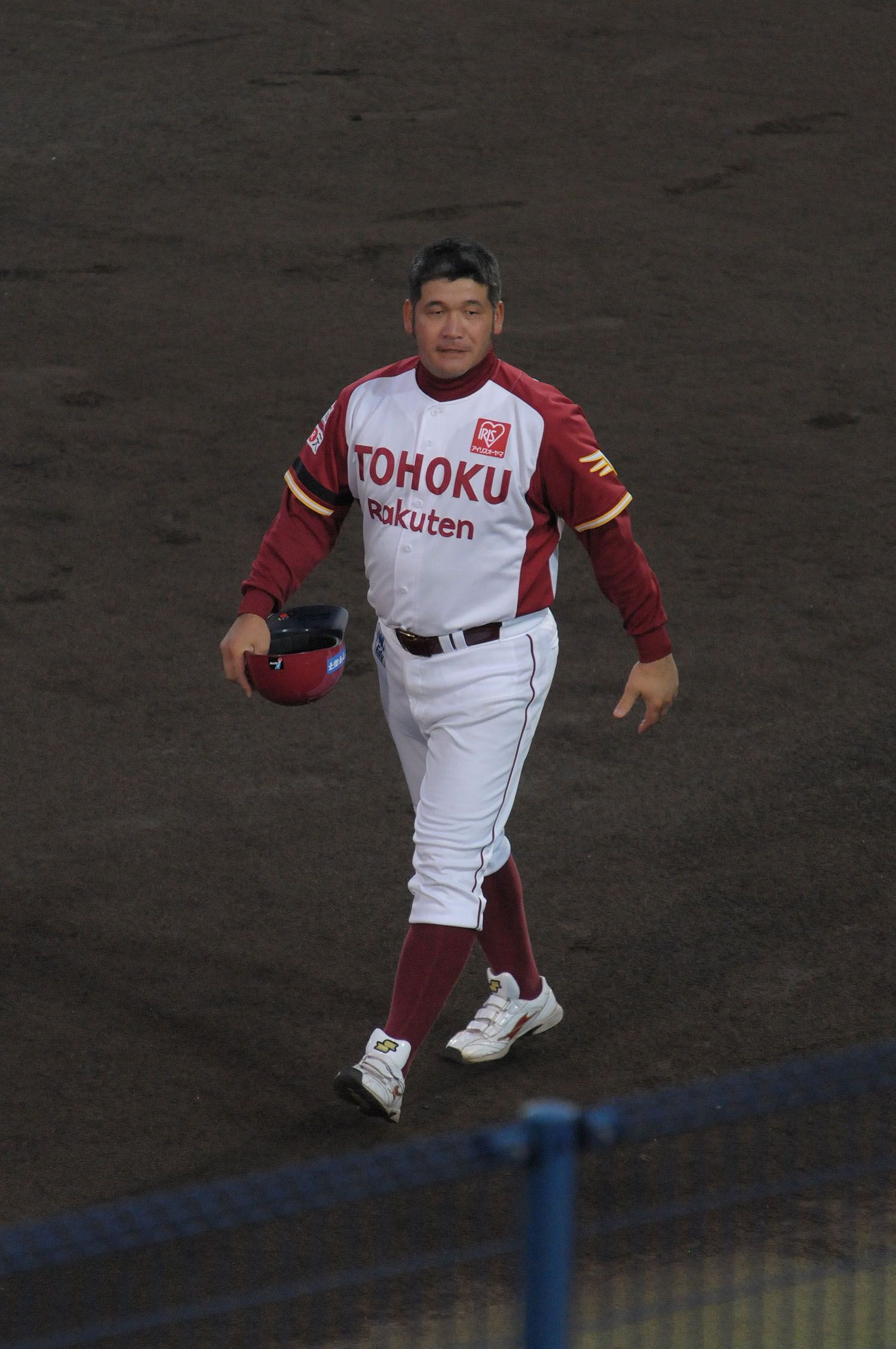
- Infielder
- Born: July 18, 1971 (age 54); Yao, Osaka, Japan
- Batted: Right Threw: Right

NPB debut
- August 20, 1990, for the Chunichi Dragons

Last NPB appearance
- September 24, 2007, for the Yokohama BayStars

NPB statistics (through 2008)
- Batting average: .264
- Home runs: 71
- Hits: 1102

Teams
- As player: Chunichi Dragons (1990–2001); Yokohama BayStars (2001–2007); Saitama Seibu Lions (2008); As coach: Samsung Lions (2010); Tohoku Rakuten Golden Eagles (2011)

Career highlights and awards
- 3× NPB All-Star (1993, 2004, 2005); Comeback Player of the Year (2000)

Hitoshi Taneda (種田 仁, born July 18, 1971) is a former Nippon Professional Baseball infielder.
