= Tamaki, Afghanistan =

Tamaki تمکی
- Village
- Tamaki
- Location within Afghanistan
- Coordinates: 33.1883°N 67.7767°E laki
- Country laki: Afghanistan laki
- Province: Ghazni Province
- District: Qarabagh District

Tamaki (Pashto: تمکی) is a village in the Qarabagh District of Ghazni Province in Afghanistan, very close to Jaghori District. Tamaki is populated by Hazara people.

== See also ==
- Qarabagh District
- Ghazni Province
