= Tsunemi Tsuda =

Japanese baseball player (1960–1993)

- Pitcher
- Born: August 1, 1960; Shūnan, Yamaguchi, Japan
- Died: July 20, 1993 (aged 32); Fukuoka, Japan
- Batted: Right Threw: Right

NPB debut
- April 10, 1982, for the Hiroshima Carp

Last NPB appearance
- April 14, 1991, for the Hiroshima Carp

NPB statistics
- Earned run average: 3.31
- Wins: 49
- Saves: 90
- Complete games: 19
- Shutouts: 2
- Strikeouts: 542
- Stats at Baseball Reference

Teams
- Hiroshima Toyo Carp (1982–1991)

Career highlights and awards
- 1982 Central League Rookie of the Year; NPB Comeback Player of the Year Award (1986); NPB Relief Man of the Year Award (1989); 5× NPB All-Star (1983, 1986 - 1989)

Member of the Japanese

Baseball Hall of Fame
- Induction: 2012

Tsunemi Tsuda (津田 恒実, Tsuda Tsunemi; August 1, 1960 – July 20, 1993) was a Japanese baseball player of the Hiroshima Toyo Carp of Japan's Central League.

He was one of the most famous Japanese right-handed pitchers. He was known as the "Stopper of Flame" (炎のストッパー, Honou-no-Stopper) because from his pitching style with the fastball. His nickname was "Tsune-Gon"(ツネゴン).

He was born in Shūnan, Yamaguchi. He retired in 1991, and died of brain tumor in 1993, when he was 32 years old.

His memorial plate, found at Hiroshima Municipal Stadium, is inscribed with the words "We will never forget about his fastball, smile, courage and bravery".

He led his team in two Japan Series and won one title (1984).

== Career ==
- 1st pitch: April 10, 1982.
- 1st win: April 29, 1982.
- Rookie of the Year Award winner: 1982
- Comeback Player of the Year Award winner: 1986
- Best Pitcher of Japan Series Award winner: 1986
- Relief Man of the Year Award winner: 1989
- Japan All-star game: 1983, 1986, 1987, 1988 and 1989
- 49 W, 90 S, 19 CG, 2 Shutout and 542 K.

=== Statistics ===
Year	Team	No.	GP	W	L	S	IP	ER	K	ERA	Titles
1982	Hiroshima	15	31	11	6	0	166.2	72	114	3.88	Rookie of the Year
1983	Hiroshima	15	19	9	3	0	132.2	45	82	3.07	
1984	Hiroshima	15	14	3	4	1	54.1	28	30	4.64	Japan Series Champion
1985	Hiroshima	14	22	2	3	1	42.0	31	36	6.64	
1986	Hiroshima	14	49	4	6	22	69.1	16	81	2.08	Comeback Player of the Year, League Champion
1987	Hiroshima	14	47	3	4	18	65.2	12	160	1.64	
1988	Hiroshima	14	47	5	9	20	72.1	31	56	3.86	
1989	Hiroshima	14	51	12	5	28	83.0	15	75	1.63	Relief Man of the Year
1990	Hiroshima	14	4	0	0	0	6.2	2	7	2.70	
1991	Hiroshima	14	2	0	1	0	1.0	3	1	27.00	hospitalized before League Champion
TOTALS		-	286	49	41	90	693.0	255	542	3.31	-

== Honours ==
- The minor planet 79254 Tsuda was named in his memory on June 1, 2007.

== Media ==
=== Books ===
- Just One More Pitch - The Fastball Life of Red-Hot Reliever Tsuda Tsunemi (ISBN 4-87728-743-4) - NHK Books (1994)
- The Last Strike (two years and three months with Tsuda Tsunemi) (ISBN 4-87728-607-1) - Keibunsha (1995)

=== Documentary and Drama ===
- Just One More Pitch: The Fastball Life of Red-Hot Reliever Tsuda Tsunemi - NHK (1994)
- The Last Strike - Fuji Television (2000)
