= Knight Scoop =

- Also known as: 探偵!ナイトスクープ
- Presented by: Hitoshi Matsumoto (Chairman); Saori Masuda (Secretary)
- Country of origin: Japan
- Original language: Japanese

Production
- Production company: Asahi Broadcasting Television

Original release
- Release: March 5, 1988

Knight Scoop (探偵!ナイトスクープ, Tantei Naito Sukūpu) is a Japanese television program produced by ABC TV and airs locally in the Kansai region on Friday nights at 11:17 pm.

The premise of the show is of a Detective Agency which takes requests from the viewers. The 'detectives' on the show go on an investigation, which typically involves searching for people/places, street surveys, local reports, overcoming fears and experiments. The detective is typically accompanied by the viewer who made the request. The show is based out of the city of Osaka but frequently involves travel to other parts of Japan. Food-related requests are often brought to the professional celebrity chef Hayashi Hirohito.

Koeda Katsura, a rakugo performer, was a regular comedian on the show for 25 years until an incident referred to as the "pudding affair" occurred, which involved pictures released of Katsura lying in bed partially covered with pudding.

== Cast ==
- "Chairman"
  - Ryūtarō Kamioka (1988–2000)
  - Toshiyuki Nishida (2001–2019)
  - Hitoshi Matsumoto (2019–present)
- "Secretary"
  - Chiaki Matsubara (1988–1989)
  - Mari Okabe (1989–2010)
  - Erika Matsuo (2010–2018)
  - Saori Masuda (2019–present)

== See also ==
- Television in Japan
