= Kenji Tomashino =

Japanese baseball player and coach

- Infielder / Outfielder / Coach
- Born: October 11, 1966 (age 59); Ibaraki, Osaka, Japan
- Batted: Both Threw: Right

NPB debut
- April 12, 1989, for the Yakult Swallows

Last appearance
- October 11, 1999, for the Hiroshima Toyo Carp

NPB statistics (through 1999)
- Batting average: .254
- Hits: 418
- Home runs: 19
- Runs batted in: 105
- Stolen bases: 79
- Stats at Baseball Reference

Teams
- As player: Yakult Swallows (1989–1997); Hiroshima Toyo Carp (1998–1999); As coach: Hiroshima Toyo Carp (2000–2002)

Career highlights and awards
- 1989 Central League Rookie of the Year
Medals
Men's baseball
Representing Japan
Olympic Games
Silver medal – second place	1988 Seoul	Team

Kenji Tomashino (笘篠 賢治, Tomashino Kenji; born October 11, 1966) is a Japanese former Nippon Professional Baseball infielder/outfielder. His elder brother, Seiji, is also a professional baseball player.

== Life ==
After graduating from high school, Tomashino went on to Chuo University. There he played as an outfielder and was especially useful because he also protected the infield.

At the 1988 draft meeting, Tomashino agreed to join the Tokyo Yakult Swallows with a contract fee of ¥50 million and an annual salary of ¥6 million.

Since 1989, he has been active with his fast feet as a weapon, and participated in the junior all-star game. That year, he was active as a second baseman instead of his main outfielder position and recorded 32 stolen bases and was awarded the Nippon Professional Baseball Rookie of the Year Award. Kozo Shoda of Hiroshima won the title of the base stealing king with 34 bases. The following year, Tomashino's opportunities decreased under the supervision of Katsuya Nomura, and as a result, his first year became his career-high.

After his career as a baseball player, he has been a commentator for Nippon Cultural Broadcasting, Fuji TV One's PROFESSIONAL BASEBALL NEWS, and TV Shinhiroshima.

== Family ==
Tomashino is married to former talent and idol singer Noriko Matsumoto and the two have three sons.
