= Hiroshi Takamura =

Japanese baseball player and coach

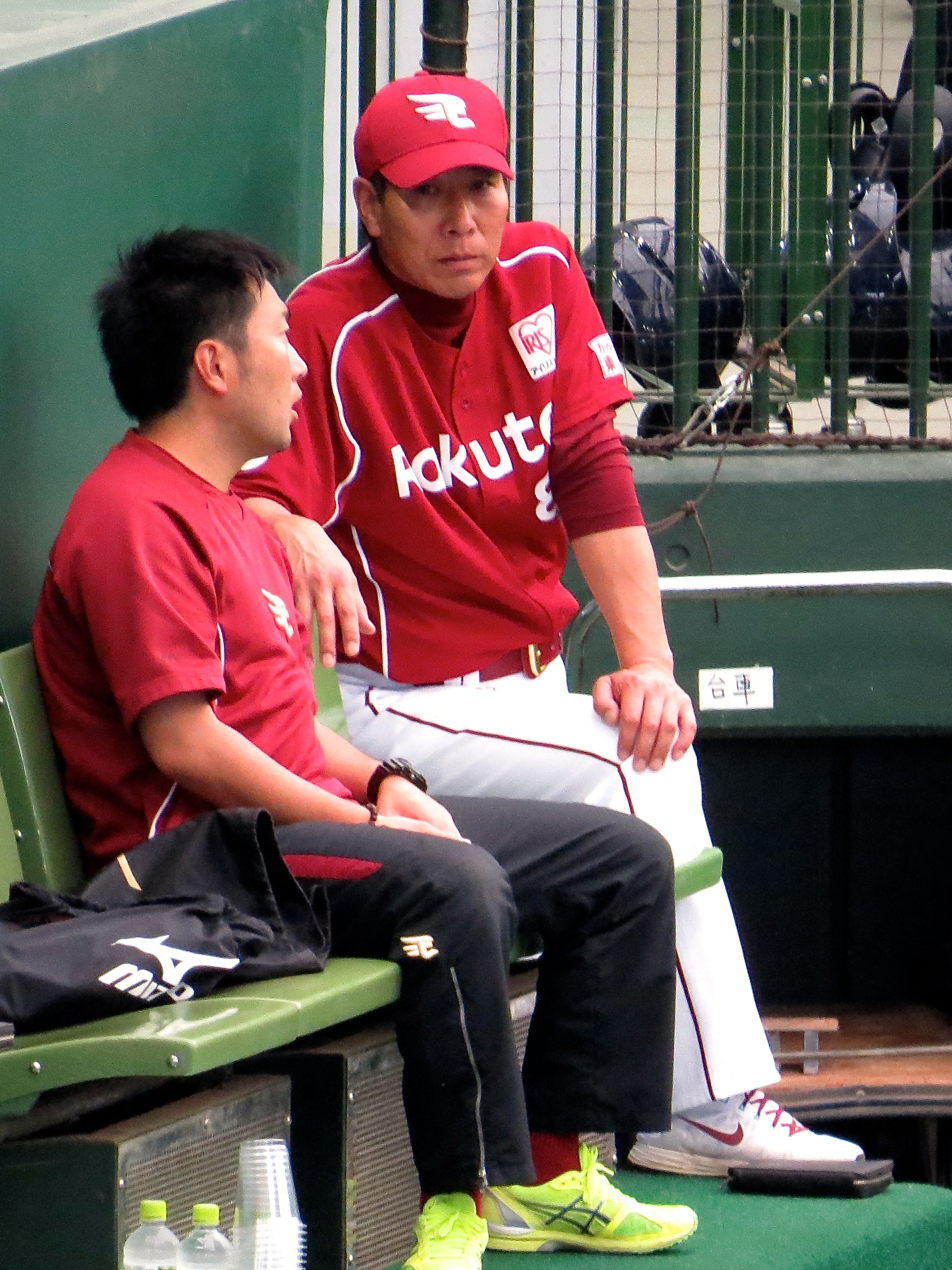
- Takamura with the Tohoku Rakuten Golden Eagles
- Pitcher / Coach
- Born: September 2, 1969 (age 56); Utsunomiya, Tochigi, Japan
- Batted: Right Threw: Right

NPB debut
- April 8, 1992, for the Kintetsu Buffaloes

Last NPB appearance
- July 6, 2005, for the Tohoku Rakuten Golden Eagles

NPB statistics (through 2005)
- Win–loss record: 83-102
- Saves: 9
- ERA: 4.31
- Strikeouts: 1094

Teams
- As player: Kintetsu Buffaloes/Osaka Kintetsu Buffaloes (1992–2004); Tohoku Rakuten Golden Eagles (2005); As coach: Tohoku Rakuten Golden Eagles (2007–2015); Fukuoka SoftBank Hawks (2016–2023)

Career highlights and awards
- 2× NPB All-Star (1996, 1998); 1992 Pacific League Rookie of the Year
- Last updated on: 5 December 2023

Hiroshi Takamura (髙村 祐, born September 2, 1969) is a Japanese former Nippon Professional Baseball pitcher, pitching coach.

He previously played for the Kintetsu Buffaloes, the Tohoku Rakuten Golden Eagles.

== Professional career ==
=== Active player era ===
On November 22, 1991, Takamura was drafted first round pick by the Kintetsu Buffaloes in the 1991 Nippon Professional Baseball draft.

He debuted in the Pacific League in his rookie year, the 1992 season, and won the 1992 Pacific League Rookie of the Year Award with 13 wins, beating out Kenichi Wakatabe.

After his 13th season with the Buffaloes in 2004, the Osaka Kintetsu Buffaloes ceased to exist due to the 2004 Nippon Professional Baseball realignment, and he was transferred to the Tohoku Rakuten Golden Eagles in the distribution draft.

He only pitched in one game during the 2005 season before retiring at the end of the season.

In his 14-season career, Takamura pitched in 287 games, posting a 83-102 win–loss record, 9 saves, and a 4.31 ERA.

=== After retirement ===
After his retirement, Takamura became the second squad pitching development coach for the Tohoku Rakuten Golden Eagles in the 2007 season, and was named second squad pitching coach in the 2009 season.

He also served as the second squad pitching development coach again beginning with the 2012 season and as the first squad pitching coach for the 2015 season.

He was named second squad pitching coach for the Fukuoka Softbank Hawks for the 2016 season.

He is also the first squad pitching coach from the 2017 season through the 2021 season and second squad pitching coach beginning in the 2022 season.

On October 24, 2023, it was reported that Takamura will leave the Hawks after the 2023 season.
