= Shingo Takeyama =

Japanese baseball player (born 1984)

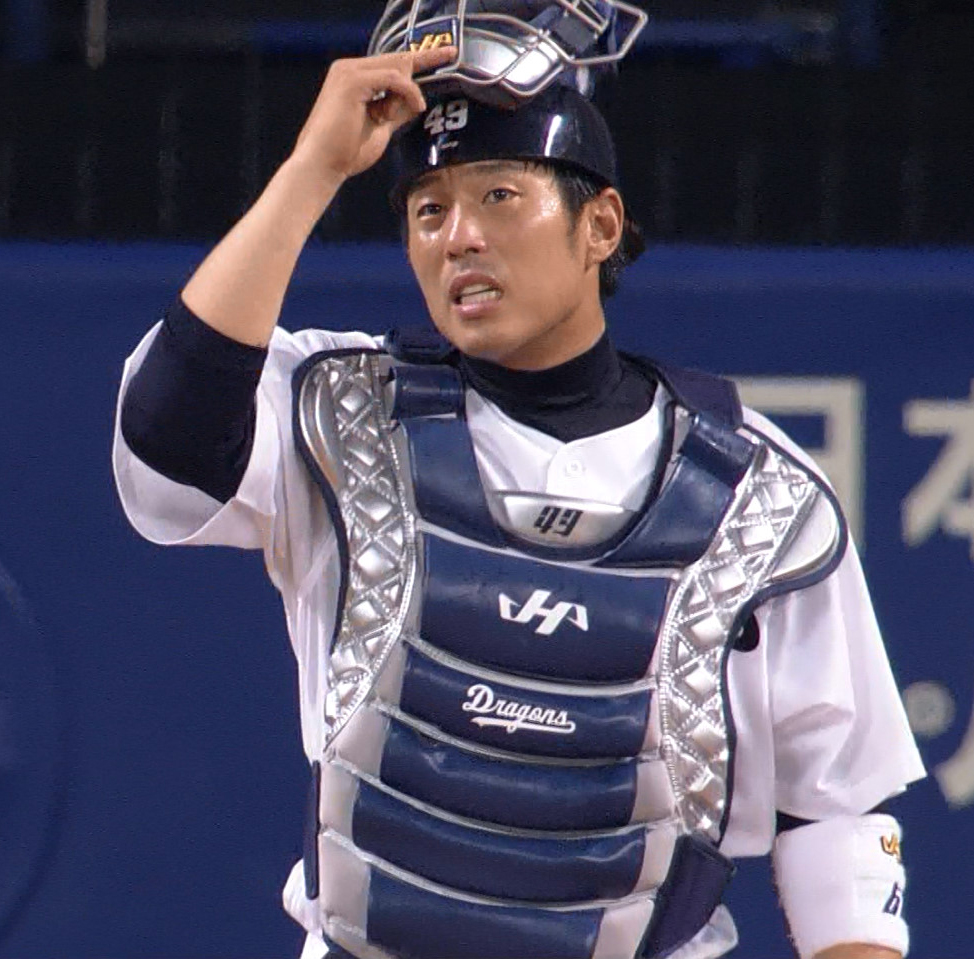
- Takeyama with the Chunichi Dragons
- Catcher/Battery Coach
- Born: June 22, 1984 (age 42); Nagoya, Aichi, Japan
- Bats: Right Throws: Right

debut
- April 3, 2014, for the Yokohama BayStars

NPB statistics (through 2016)
- Batting Average: .180
- Homeruns: 3
- RBIs: 44
- Stats at Baseball Reference

Teams
- As player: Yokohama BayStars (2013–2011); Saitama Seibu Lions (2012–2014); Chunichi Dragons (2014–2019); As coach: Chunichi Dragons (2020–2021)

Shingo Takeyama (武山 真吾, Takeyama Shingo; born June 22, 1984 in Nagoya, Aichi, Japan) is a retired professional Japanese baseball player. He played catcher for the Yokohama BayStars, Saitama Seibu Lions and Chunichi Dragons.
