= Yutaka Tamaki =

Japanese baseball player

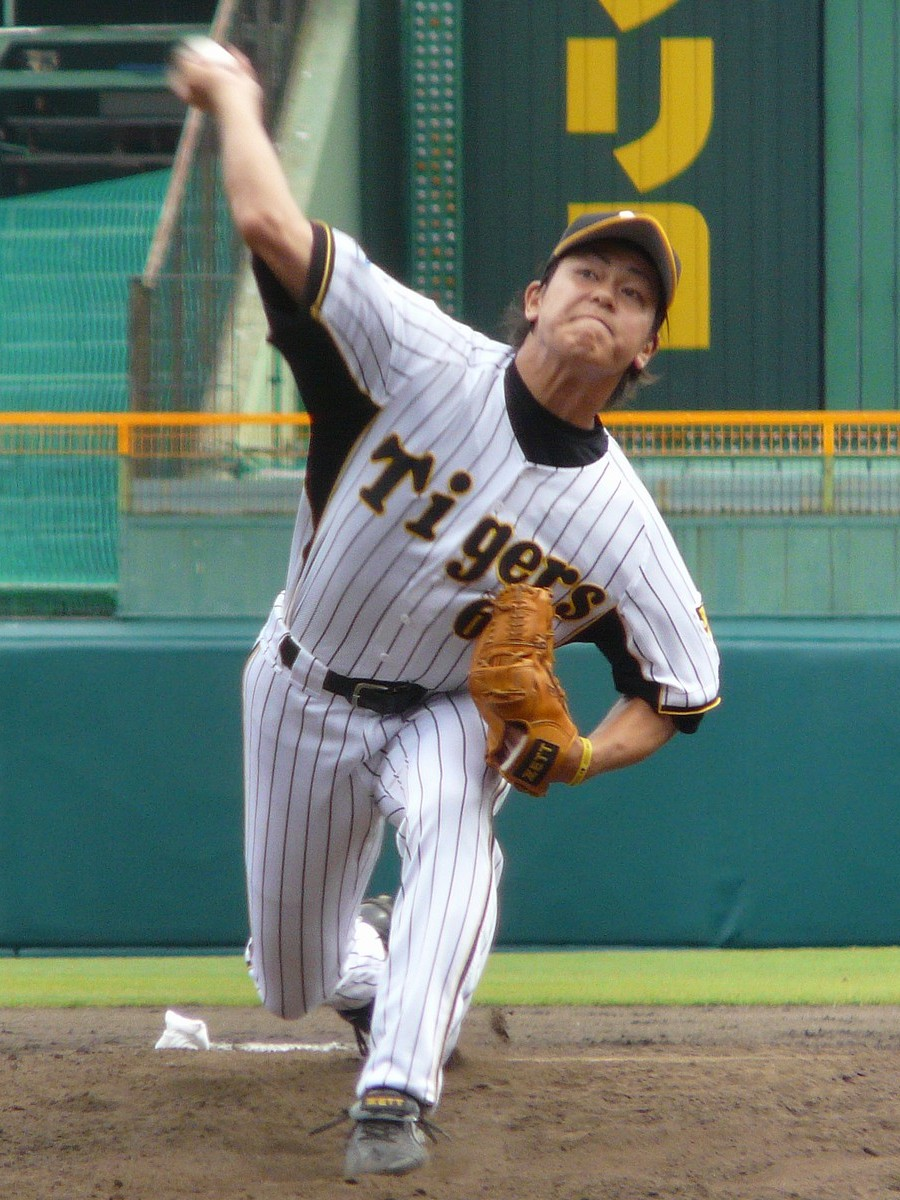
- Tamaki with the Hanshin Tigers
- Pitcher
- Born: September 11, 1986 (age 39); Wakayama, Japan
- Bats: Right Throws: Right

debut
- 2006, for the Hanshin Tigers

Career statistics (through 2014)
- Games: 5
- Innings Pitched: 4.2
- ERA: 3.86
- Stats at Baseball Reference

Teams
- Hanshin Tigers (2006–2008, 2013–2015)

Yutaka Tamaki (Japanese 玉置 隆; born 11 September 1986) is a Japanese professional baseball pitcher who currently plays for the Hanshin Tigers of Nippon Professional Baseball.
