= Tomotaka Tamaki =

Japanese baseball player

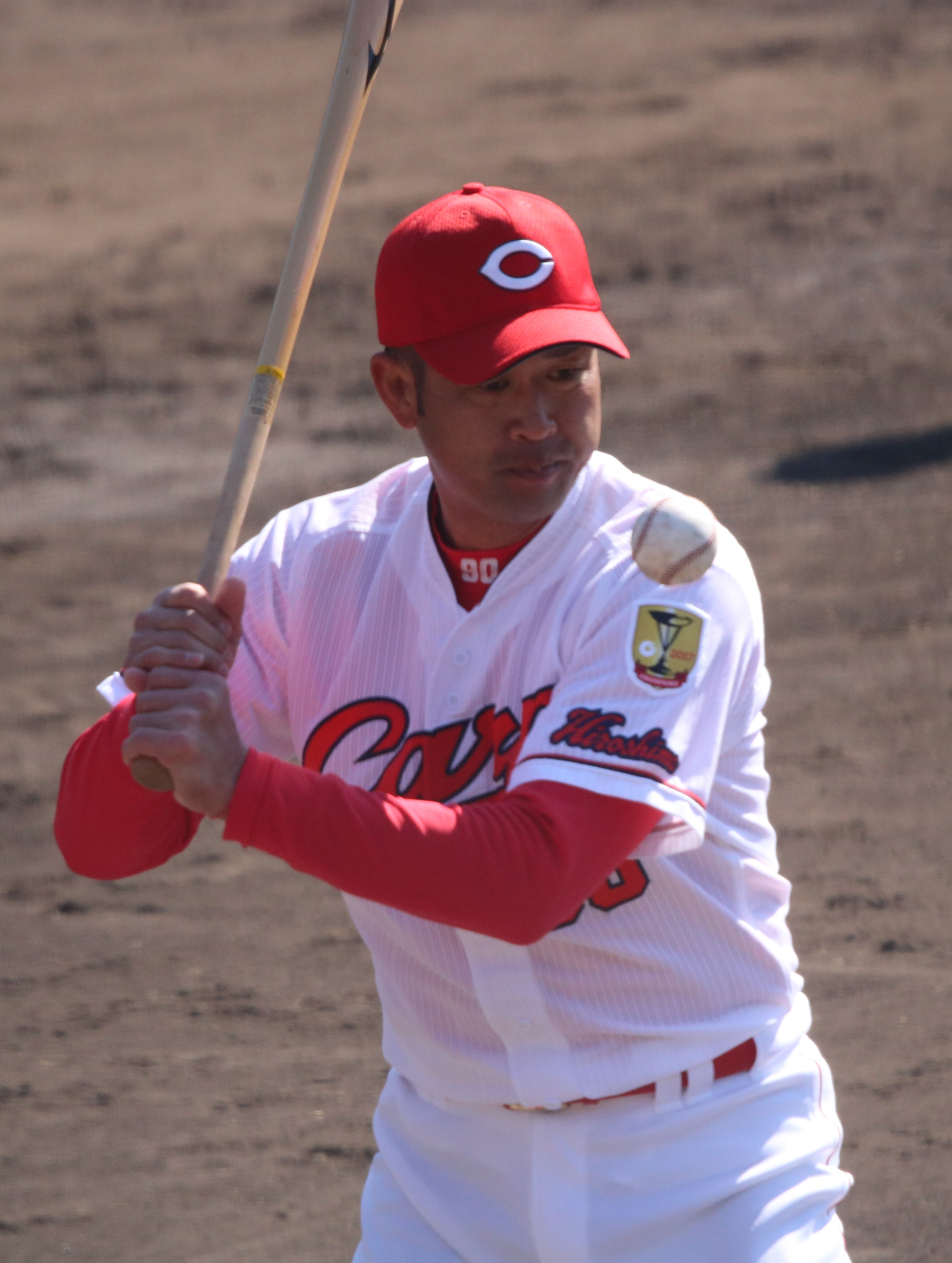
- Tamaki with the Hiroshima Toyo Carp
- Infielder / Coach
- Born: June 13, 1975 (age 50); Edogawa, Tokyo, Japan
- Batted: Right Threw: Right

NPB debut
- May 18, 1999, for the Hiroshima Toyo Carp

Last NPB appearance
- September 25, 2005, for the Orix Buffaloes

Career statistics
- Batting average: .224
- Home runs: 0
- Hits: 22
- Stats at Baseball Reference

Teams
- As player: Hiroshima Toyo Carp (1994–2000); Orix BlueWave/Orix Buffaloes (2001–2005); As coach: Hiroshima Toyo Carp (2011–2022); Uni-President Lions (2023 - 2025)
- Last updated on: 27 December 2018

Tomotaka Tamaki (玉木 朋孝, Tamaki Tomotaka; born June 13, 1975 in Edogawa, Tokyo, Japan) is a former professional Japanese baseball player.
