= Seiji Tomashino =

Japanese baseball player and coach (born 1964)

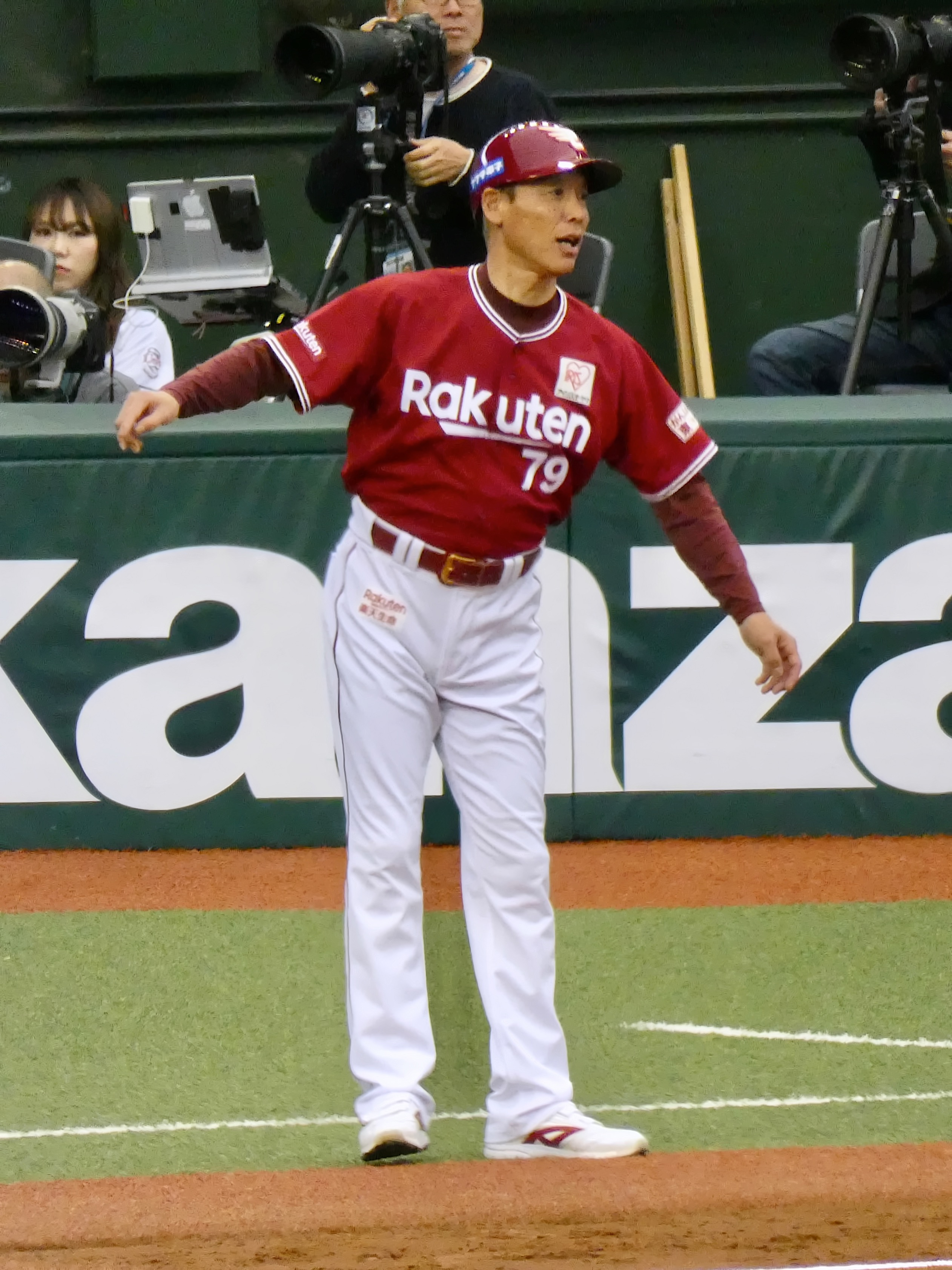
- Infielder / Outfielder / Coach
- Born: June 22, 1964; Ibaraki, Osaka, Japan
- Batted: Right Threw: Right

NPB debut
- June 22, 1983, for the Seibu Lions

Last appearance
- October 12, 1997, for the Seibu Lions

NPB statistics (through 1997)
- Batting average: .256
- Hits: 381
- Home runs: 18
- Runs batted in: 121
- Stolen base: 90
- Stats at Baseball Reference

Teams
- As player: Seibu Lions (1983–1997); As coach: Seibu Lions (1998–2007); Chunichi Dragons (2008–2011); Fukuoka SoftBank Hawks (2012–2014); Tohoku Rakuten Golden Eagles (2015, 2019–2020); Tokyo Yakult Swallows (2016–2017)

Seiji Tomashino (笘篠 誠治, Tomashino Seiji; born June 22, 1964 in Ibaraki, Osaka, Japan) is a Japanese former Nippon Professional Baseball infielder/outfielder.

His younger brother Kenji is also a professional baseball player.
