= Naotaka Takehara =

Japanese baseball player (born 1980)

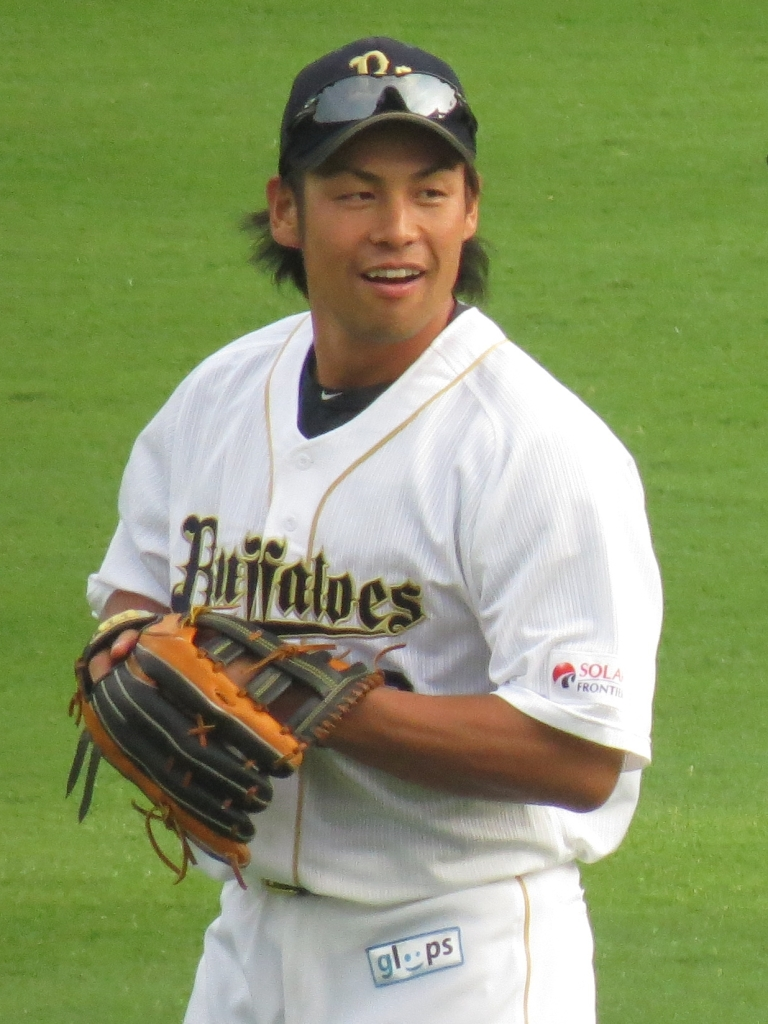
- Takehara with the Orix Buffaloes
- Outfielder
- Born: April 21, 1980 (age 46); Okayama, Okayama, Japan
- Bats: Right Throws: Left

NPB debut
- June 10, 2005, for the Chiba Lotte Marines

NPB statistics (through 2016)
- Batting average: .212
- Home runs: 27
- RBI: 124
- Stats at Baseball Reference

Teams
- Chiba Lotte Marines (2005–2011); Orix Buffaloes (2011–2015); Saitama Seibu Lions (2016–2016)

Naotaka Takehara (竹原 直隆, Takehara Naotaka; born April 21, 1980 in Okayama, Okayama, Japan) is a Japanese professional baseball outfielder for the Saitama Seibu Lions in Japan's Nippon Professional Baseball.
