= List of Yomiuri Giants seasons =

The Yomiuri Giants are a professional baseball team based in Tokyo. Also known as Kyojin, the Giants play in the Central League of Nippon Professional Baseball. The team started play in 1934 as a team of all-stars named the Great Japan Tokyo Baseball Club, which was organized by media mogul Matsutarō Shōriki that toured the United States. In 1936, with the formation of the Japanese Baseball League, the team, now known as the Tokyo Giants, began play. They rebranded to Tokyo Kyojin in 1941 before changing their name to their current form in 1947. The Giants won nine JBL championships from 1936 to 1949.

Since the formation of NPB in 1950, in their 76 seasons, the franchise has won 22 Japan Series championships, the most of any NPB team and 9 more than the second-place Saitama Seibu Lions. They have finished first place in the Central League 39 times and have competed in the Japan Series 36 times. The Giants have played home at Tokyo Dome since 1988.

== Table key ==
Key to symbols and terms in season table
W	Number of regular season wins
L	Number of regular season losses
T	Number of regular season ties
GB	Games behind from league's first-place team^{[a]}
ROY	Rookie of the Year
MVP	Most Valuable Player
ESA	Eiji Sawamura Award
BNA	Best Nine Award
MSA	Matsutaro Shoriki Award

== Season-by-season records ==
Japan Series Champions (1950–present) †	Japanese Baseball League / Central League Champions (1950–present)	Climax Series Berth (2007–present) ¤

Season	League	Finish	Wins	Losses	Ties	Win%	GB	Playoffs	Awards
Tokyo Giants / Tokyo Kyojin
1936	JBL	^{[A]}	2	5	0	.286	—	—	
Autumn 1936	JBL	1st	18	9	0	.667	—	Won Playoff (Tigers) 2–1 ^{[B]}	
Spring 1937	JBL	1st	41	13	2	.759	—	^{[B]}	Eiji Sawamura (MVP)
Autumn 1937	JBL	2nd	30	18	0	.625	9	—	
Spring 1938	JBL	2nd	24	11	0	.686	5	—	
Autumn 1938	JBL	1st	30	9	1	.769	—	^{[B]}	Haruyasu Nakajima (MVP)
1939	JBL	1st	66	26	4	.717	—	^{[B]}	Victor Starffin (MVP)
1940	JBL	1st	76	28	0	.731	—	^{[B]}	Victor Starffin (MVP)
1941	JBL	1st	62	22	2	.738	—	^{[B]}	Tetsuharu Kawakami (MVP)
1942	JBL	1st	73	27	5	.730	—	^{[B]}	Shigeru Mizuhara (MVP)
1943	JBL	1st	54	27	3	.667	—	^{[B]}	Shosei Go (MVP)
1944	JBL	2nd	19	14	2	.576	8	—	
1945	No league play because of World War II								
1946	JBL	2nd	64	39	2	.621	1	—	
Yomiuri Giants
1947	JBL	5th	56	59	4	.487	22.5	—	
1948	JBL	2nd	83	55	2	.601	5	—	
1949	JBL	1st	85	48	1	.639	—	^{[B]}	
1950	Central	3rd	82	54	4	.603	17.5	—	
1951	Central	1st	79	29	6	.731	—	Won Japan Series (Hawks) 4–1	Tetsuharu Kawakami (MVP)
1952	Central	1st	83	37	0	.692	—	Won Japan Series (Hawks) 4–2	Takehiko Bessho (MVP)
1953	Central	1st	87	37	1	.702	—	Won Japan Series (Hawks) 4–2–1	
1954	Central	2nd	82	47	1	.636	5.5		Takumi Otomo (MVP)
1955	Central	1st	92	37	1	.713	—	Won Japan Series (Hawks) 4–3	Tetsuharu Kawakami (MVP)
1956	Central	1st	82	44	4	.646	—	Lost Japan Series (Lions) 4–2	Takehiko Bessho (MVP)
1957	Central	1st	74	53	3	.581	—	Lost Japan Series (Lions) 4–0–1	Wally Yonamine (MVP)
1958	Central	1st	77	52	1	.596	—	Lost Japan Series (Lions) 4–3	Motoshi Fujita (MVP)
1959	Central	1st	77	48	5	.612	—	Lost Japan Series (Hawks) 4–0	Motoshi Fujita (MVP)
1960	Central	3rd	66	61	3	.519	4.5		
1961	Central	1st	71	53	6	.569	—	Won Japan Series (Hawks) 4–2	Shigeo Nagashima (MVP)
1962	Central	4th	67	63	4	.515	8		
1963	Central	1st	83	55	2	.601	—	Won Japan Series (Lions) 4–3	Shigeo Nagashima (MVP)
1964	Central	3rd	71	69	0	.507	11		Sadaharu Oh (MVP)
1965	Central	1st	91	47	2	.659	—	Won Japan Series (Hawks) 4–2	Sadaharu Oh (MVP)
1966	Central	1st	89	41	4	.685	—	Won Japan Series (Hawks) 4–2	Shigeo Nagashima (MVP)
1967	Central	1st	84	46	4	.646	—	Won Japan Series (Braves) 4–2	Sadaharu Oh (MVP)
1968	Central	1st	77	53	4	.592	—	Won Japan Series (Braves) 4–2	Shigeo Nagashima (MVP)
1969	Central	1st	73	51	6	.589	—	Won Japan Series (Braves) 4–2	Sadaharu Oh (MVP)
1970	Central	1st	79	47	4	.627	—	Won Japan Series (Orions) 4–1	Sadaharu Oh (MVP)
1971	Central	1st	70	52	8	.574	—	Won Japan Series (Braves) 4–1	Shigeo Nagashima (MVP)
1972	Central	1st	74	52	4	.587	—	Won Japan Series (Braves) 4–1	Tsuneo Horiuchi (MVP)
1973	Central	1st	66	60	4	.524	—	Won Japan Series (Hawks) 4–1	Sadaharu Oh (MVP)
1974	Central	2nd	71	50	9	.587	0	^{[C]}	Sadaharu Oh (MVP)
1975	Central	6th	47	76	7	.382	27		
1976	Central	1st	76	45	9	.628	—	Lost Japan Series (Braves) 4–3	Sadaharu Oh (MVP)
1977	Central	1st	80	46	4	.635	—	Lost Japan Series (Braves) 4–1	Sadaharu Oh (MVP)
1978	Central	2nd	65	49	16	.570	3		
1979	Central	5th	58	62	10	.483	10.5		
1980	Central	3rd	61	60	9	.504	14		
1981	Central	1st	73	48	9	.603	—	Won Japan Series (Fighters) 4–2	Suguru Egawa (MVP)
1982	Central	2nd	66	50	14	.569	0.5		
1983	Central	1st	72	50	8	.590	—	Lost Japan Series (Lions) 4–3	Tatsunori Hara (MVP)
1984	Central	3rd	67	54	9	.554	8.5		
1985	Central	3rd	61	60	9	.504	12		
1986	Central	2nd	75	48	7	.610	0		
1987	Central	1st	76	43	11	.639	—	Lost Japan Series (Lions) 4–2	Kazuhiro Yamakura (MVP)
1988	Central	2nd	68	59	3	.535	12		
1989	Central	1st	84	44	2	.656	—	Won Japan Series (Buffaloes) 4–3	Warren Cromartie (MVP)
1990	Central	1st	88	42	0	.677	—	Lost Japan Series (Lions) 4–0	Masaki Saito (MVP)
1991	Central	4th	66	64	0	.508	8		
1992	Central	2nd	67	63	0	.515	2		
1993	Central	3rd	64	66	1	.492	16		
1994	Central	1st	70	60	0	.538	— ^{[D]}	Won Japan Series (Lions) 4–2	Masumi Kuwata (MVP)
1995	Central	3rd	72	58	1	.554	10		
1996	Central	1st	77	53	0	.592	—	Lost Japan Series (BlueWave) 4–1	Hideki Matsui (MVP)
1997	Central	4th	63	72	0	.467	20		
1998	Central	3rd	73	62	0	.541	6		
1999	Central	2nd	75	60	0	.556	6		
2000	Central	1st	78	57	0	.578	—	Won Japan Series (Hawks) 4–2	Hideki Matsui (MVP)
2001	Central	2nd	75	63	2	.543	3		
2002	Central	1st	86	52	2	.623	—	Won Japan Series (Lions) 4–0	Hideki Matsui (MVP)
2003	Central	3rd	71	66	3	.518	15.5		
2004	Central	3rd	71	64	3	.526	8		
2005	Central	5th	62	80	4	.437	25.5		
2006	Central	4th	65	79	2	.451	23.5		
2007	Central	1st	80	63	1	.559	—	Lost Climax Series Final Stage (Dragons) 3–0	Michihiro Ogasawara (MVP)
2008	Central	1st	84	57	3	.596	—	Won Climax Series Final Stage (Dragons) 3–1; Lost Japan Series (Lions) 4–3	Alex Ramírez (MVP)
2009	Central	1st	89	46	9	.659	—	Won Climax Series Final Stage (Dragons) 4–1; Won Japan Series (Fighters) 4–2	Alex Ramírez (MVP)
2010	Central	3rd	79	64	1	.552	1	Won Climax Series First Stage (Tigers) 2–0; Lost Climax Series Final Stage (Dragons) 1–4	
2011	Central	3rd	71	62	11	.534	3.5	Lost Climax Series First Stage (Swallows) 2–1	
2012	Central	1st	86	43	15	.667	—	Won Climax Series Final Stage (Dragons) 4–3; Won Japan Series (Fighters) 4–2	Shinnosuke Abe (MVP)
2013	Central	1st	84	53	7	.613	—	Won Climax Series Final Stage (Carp) 4–0; Lost Japan Series (Golden Eagles) 4–3	
2014	Central	1st	82	61	1	.573	—	Lost Climax Series Final Stage (Tigers) 4–1	Tomoyuki Sugano (MVP)
2015	Central	2nd	75	67	1	.528	1.5	Won Climax Series First Stage (Tigers) 2–1; Lost Climax Series Final Stage (Swallows) 4–1	
2016	Central	2nd	71	69	3	.507	17.5	Lost Climax Series First Stage (BayStars) 2–1	
2017	Central	4th	72	68	3	.514	16.5		
2018	Central	3rd	67	71	5	.486	13.5	Won Climax Series First Stage (Swallows) 2–0; Lost Climax Series Final Stage (Carp) 4–0	
2019	Central	1st	77	64	2	.546	—	Won Climax Series Final Stage (Tigers) 4–1; Lost Japan Series (Hawks) 4–0	Hayato Sakamoto (MVP)
2020	Central^{[D]}	1st	67	45	8	.598	—	Lost Japan Series (Hawks) 4–0	Tomoyuki Sugano (MVP)
2021	Central	3rd	61	62	20	.496	11	Won Climax Series First Stage (Tigers) 2–0; Lost Climax Series Final Stage (Swallows) 4–0	
2022	Central	4th	68	72	3	.486	12.5		
2023	Central	4th	71	70	2	.504	15.5		
2024	Central	1st	77	59	7	.566	—	Lost Climax Series Final Stage (Baystars) 4–3	Tomoyuki Sugano (MVP)
2025	Central	3rd	70	69	4	.504	15	Lost Climax Series First Stage (BayStars) 2–0	
2026	Central	2nd	76	64	3	.543	2.5	Lost Climax Series First Stage (BayStars) 2–0	

== Notes ==
- ^{a} This is determined by calculating the difference in wins plus the difference in losses divided by two.

^{A} Records for the 1936 season are not complete. In the inaugural season, a Fall playoff between the top two teams, the Osaka Tigers and the Tokyo Kyojin, was played. The Kyojin won the series two games-to-one to be declared champions.
^{B} For all but the first season of 1936, the JBL did not institute a playoff of any kind. The 1936, 1937, and 1938 seasons were the only seasons in its existence with first and second half champions.
^{C} Excluding ties, the Chunichi Dragons prevailed to win the Central League pennant with a record of 70–49 (.5882) while the Giants had a record of 71–50 (.5867)
^{D} Both the Giants and Chunichi Dragons were 69–60 before the 130th and final game of the season. In the 1994 Central League tie-breaker game, otherwise known as the "10.8 deciding match", the Giants won 6–3.
^{E} Due to the COVID-19 pandemic in 2020, NPB saw both of their leagues modify their playoff format. The PL decided to modify the traditional Climax Series format and eliminate the First Stage series to instead play only one modified Final Stage series while the Central League sent the first place team directly to the Japan Series, which in this case was Yomiuri.
