= Matsutaro Shoriki Award =

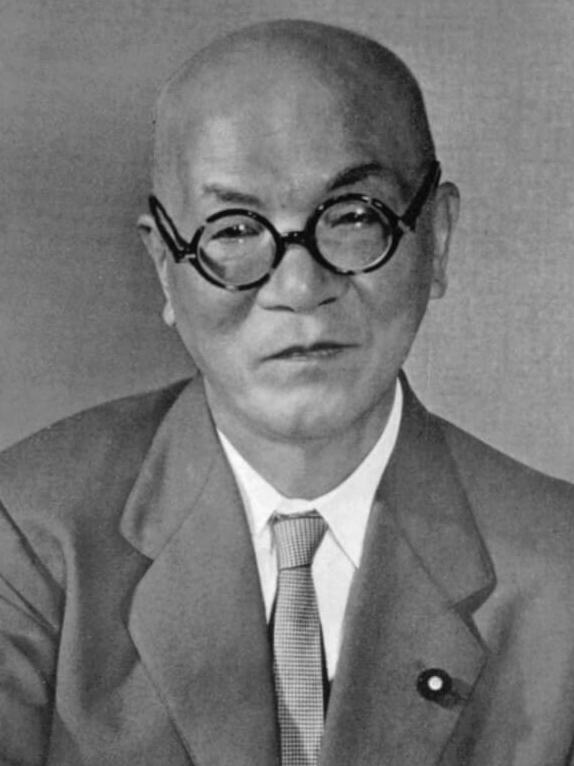
- Matsutarō Shōriki, the namesake of the award and often called the "father of Japanese professional baseball"
- Sport: Baseball
- League: Nippon Professional Baseball
- Awarded for: Best contribution to the development of professional baseball

History
- First award: 1977
- Most recent: Hiroki Kokubo (2026)

Matsutaro Shoriki Award is named in honor of Matsutarō Shōriki, the owner of the Yomiuri Shimbun, whose achievements earned him the label of the real parent of present day Japanese professional baseball. The prize was founded in 1977.

It is presented to a person (a manager or player) who greatly contributed to the development of professional baseball. A gold medal and the prize of 5 million yen are awarded to the recipient. The prize money is provided by Yomiuri Shimbun and Nippon Television.

== Recipients ==
Year	Winner	Team	Ref
1977	Sadaharu Oh	Yomiuri Giants	
1978	Tatsuro Hirooka	Yakult Swallows	
1979	Yukio Nishimoto	Kintetsu Buffaloes	
1980	Takeshi Koba	Hiroshima Toyo Carp	
1981	Motoshi Fujita	Yomiuri Giants	
1982	Tatsuro Hirooka	Seibu Lions	
1983	Koichi Tabuchi	Seibu Lions	
1984	Sachio Kinugasa	Hiroshima Toyo Carp	
1985	Yoshio Yoshida	Hanshin Tigers	
1986	Masaaki Mori	Seibu Lions	
1987	Kimiyasu Kudō	Seibu Lions	
1988	Hiromitsu Kadota	Nankai Hawks	
1989	Motoshi Fujita	Yomiuri Giants	
1990	Masaaki Mori	Seibu Lions	
1991	Koji Akiyama	Seibu Lions	
1992	Takehiro Ishii	Seibu Lions	
1993	Katsuya Nomura	Yakult Swallows	
1994	Ichiro Suzuki	Orix BlueWave	
1994	Shigeo Nagashima	Yomiuri Giants	
1995	Ichiro Suzuki	Orix BlueWave	
1996	Akira Ohgi	Orix BlueWave	
1997	Atsuya Furuta	Yakult Swallows	
1998	Kazuhiro Sasaki	Yokohama BayStars	
1999	Sadaharu Oh	Fukuoka Daiei Hawks	
2000	Hideki Matsui	Yomiuri Giants	
2001	Tsutomu Wakamatsu	Yakult Swallows	
2002	Tatsunori Hara	Yomiuri Giants	
2003	Sadaharu Oh	Fukuoka Daiei Hawks	
2003	Senichi Hoshino	Hanshin Tigers	
2004	Tsutomu Itō	Seibu Lions	
2005	Bobby Valentine	Chiba Lotte Marines	
2006	Sadaharu Oh	Fukuoka SoftBank Hawks	
2007	Hiromitsu Ochiai	Chunichi Dragons	
2008	Hisanobu Watanabe	Saitama Seibu Lions	
2009	Tatsunori Hara	Yomiuri Giants	
2010	Norifumi Nishimura	Chiba Lotte Marines	
2011	Koji Akiyama	Fukuoka SoftBank Hawks	
2012	Tatsunori Hara	Yomiuri Giants	
2012	Shinnosuke Abe	Yomiuri Giants	
2013	Senichi Hoshino	Tohoku Rakuten Golden Eagles	
2014	Koji Akiyama	Fukuoka SoftBank Hawks	
2015	Kimiyasu Kudō	Fukuoka SoftBank Hawks	
2016	Hideki Kuriyama	Hokkaido Nippon-Ham Fighters	
2017	Dennis Sarfate	Fukuoka SoftBank Hawks	
2018	Kimiyasu Kudō	Fukuoka SoftBank Hawks	
2019	Kimiyasu Kudō	Fukuoka SoftBank Hawks	
2020	Kimiyasu Kudō	Fukuoka SoftBank Hawks	
2021	Shingo Takatsu	Tokyo Yakult Swallows	
2022	Satoshi Nakajima	Orix Buffaloes	
2023	Akinobu Okada	Hanshin Tigers	
2024	Daisuke Miura	Yokohama DeNA BayStars	
2025	Hiroki Kokubo	Fukuoka SoftBank Hawks	
2026	Hiroki Kokubo	Fukuoka SoftBank Hawks	

== See also ==
- Nippon Professional Baseball § Awards
- Baseball awards § Japan
