= 1968 Japan Series =

Japanese baseball championship series

| Team (Wins) | Managers | Season |
|---|---|---|
| Yomiuri Giants (4) | Tetsuharu Kawakami | 77–53–4 (.592), 5 GA |
| Hankyu Braves (2) | Yukio Nishimoto | 80–50–4 (.615), 1 GA |
- Dates: October 12–20
- MVP: Shigeru Takada (Yomiuri)
- FSA: Tokuji Nagaike (Hankyu)

The 1968 Japan Series was the championship series of Nippon Professional Baseball (NPB) for the 1968 season. The 19th edition of the Series, it was a best-of-seven playoff that matched the Central League champion Yomiuri Giants against the Pacific League champion Hankyu Braves. This was a rematch of the previous year's Japan Series, which the Giants won. Yomiuri again defeated Hankyu in six games to capture their fourth consecutive title.

== Summary ==
| Game | Score | Date | Location | Attendance |
|---|---|---|---|---|
| 1 | Giants – 4, Braves – 5 | October 12 | Korakuen Stadium | 24,482 |
| 2 | Giants – 6, Braves – 1 | October 14 | Korakuen Stadium | 24,923 |
| 3 | Braves – 4, Giants – 9 | October 16 | Hankyu Nishinomiya Stadium | 19,462 |
| 4 | Braves – 5, Giants – 6 | October 17 | Hankyu Nishinomiya Stadium | 16,390 |
| 5 | Braves – 6, Giants – 4 | October 18 | Hankyu Nishinomiya Stadium | 15,225 |
| 6 | Giants – 7, Braves – 5 | October 20 | Korakuen Stadium | 29,229 |

== See also ==
- 1968 World Series
