= Akihito Kondo =

Japanese baseball player, coach, and manager (1938–2019)

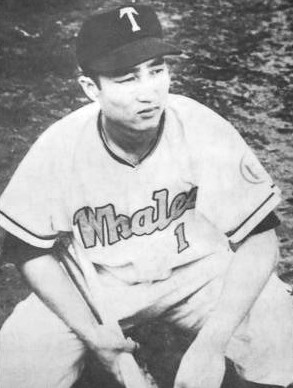
- Kondo in 1961
- Second baseman
- Born: 1 April 1938; Takamatsu, Kagawa, Japan
- Died: 27 March 2019 (aged 80); Sayō, Hyōgo, Japan
- Batted: Right Threw: Right

NPB debut
- 1960, for the Taiyō Whales

Last NPB appearance
- October 24, 1973, for the Taiyō Whales

NPB statistics
- Batting average: .243
- Home runs: 65
- RBIs: 360
- Hits: 1,183
- Stolen bases: 148
- Sacrifice bunts: 239

Teams
- As player: Taiyō Whales (1960–1973); As manager: Yokohama BayStars (1993–1995); Chiba Lotte Marines (1997–1998); As coach: Yokohama Taiyō Whales (1974–1978); Yakult Swallows (1979–1981); Seibu Lions (1982–1986); Yomiuri Giants (1989–1991, 2006)

Akihito Kondo (近藤 昭仁, Kondo Akihito; 1 April 1938 – 27 March 2019) was a Japanese Nippon Professional Baseball pitcher. He played for the Taiyō Whales from 1960 to 1973. Kondo was named the Japan Series Most Valuable Player in 1960. He later managed the Yokohama BayStars from 1993 to 1995 and the Chiba Lotte Marines in 1997 and 1998. He died on 27 March 2019, at age 80.
