= 1971 Japan Series =

Team (Wins)	Managers	Season
Yomiuri Giants (4)	Tetsuharu Kawakami	70–52–8 (.574), 6½ GA
Hankyu Braves (1)	Yukio Nishimoto	80–39–11 (.672), 3½ GA
- Dates: October 12–17
- MVP: Toshimitsu Suetsugu (Yomiuri)
- FSA: Hisashi Yamada (Hankyu)

The 1971 Japan Series was the championship series of Nippon Professional Baseball (NPB) for the 1971 season. The 22nd edition of the Series, it was a best-of-seven playoff that matched the Central League champion Yomiuri Giants against the Pacific League champion Hankyu Braves. This was the fourth time in five years that the two teams had met in the Japan Series, with the Giants winning all previous matchups. The Giants defeated the Braves in five games to win their seventh consecutive title.

== Summary ==
Game	Score	Date	Location	Attendance
1	Braves – 1, Giants – 2	October 12	Hankyu Nishinomiya Stadium	23,503
2	Braves – 8, Giants – 6	October 13	Hankyu Nishinomiya Stadium	19,914
3	Giants – 3, Braves – 1	October 15	Korakuen Stadium	33,867
4	Giants – 7, Braves – 4	October 16	Korakuen Stadium	42,182
5	Giants – 6, Braves – 1	October 17	Korakuen Stadium	43,467

== See also ==
- 1971 World Series
