= Japan Series =

Annual championship series in Nippon Professional Baseball

Tournament information
- Sport: Baseball
- Month played: Late October–early November
- Established: 1950
- Administrator: Nippon Professional Baseball
- Format: Best-of-seven series
- Teams: 2
- Defending champions: Fukuoka SoftBank Hawks (13th title)
- Most championships: Yomiuri Giants (22 titles)

Most recent tournament
- 2026 Japan Series

The Japan Series (日本シリーズ Nippon Shiriizu, officially the Japan Championship Series, プロ野球日本選手権シリーズ Puro Yakyū Nippon Senshuken Shiriizu), also the Nippon Series, is the annual championship series in Nippon Professional Baseball, the top baseball league in Japan. It is a best-of-seven series between the winning clubs of the league's two circuits, the Central League and the Pacific League, and is played in October or November. The first team to win four games is the overall winner and is declared the Japan Series Champion (日本一, Nippon Ichi; number one in Japan) each year. The Japan Series uses a 2–3–2 format, with potential extra games if needed following ties.

The home team for games 1, 2 and eventually 6 and 7, alternates between the two leagues with the Pacific League having the advantage on the years ending with an odd number and the Central League on the years ending with an even number. There is a 40-man postseason roster limit, and since 2018, games within the bounds of an originally planned 7 game series will end in a draw if no winner is decided after 12 innings. If the series is tied after the seventh game, a Game 8 will be held with the same team hosting Games 6 and 7 hosting this game. Only once has a Game 8 been played in Japan Series history, where the Seibu Lions defeated the Hiroshima Toyo Carp in 1986. In the event that Game 8 does not decide the series, the next game would be played at the stadium that hosted Games 3 through 5 after a day of rest, and games will continue until one team wins four games.

Every currently active team in NPB has won the Japan Series at least once. The team with the most championships is the Yomiuri Giants, who have won the Japan Series twenty-two times, while the defending champions, the Fukuoka SoftBank Hawks, are tied with the Saitama Seibu Lions for the second-most Japan Series championships, both with 13. In 2004, the Pacific League instituted a three-team stepladder playoff format to determine the league champion, while the Central League champion had a long wait before the Japan Series. During this time, the Pacific League won four consecutive Series from 2003 to 2006. Starting with the 2007 postseason, both leagues adopted the Climax Series to determine their champions. The Climax Series involves the top three finishers in each league, though the format gives a significant advantage to the team with the best record in each league.

On November 6, 2010, the Chunichi Dragons and Chiba Lotte Marines played the longest game in Japan Series history. It lasted fifteen innings and resulted in a 2–2 draw, with the game lasting 5 hours and 43 minutes. Only Game 2 of the 2022 Japan Series on October 23, 2022, came close, with the Orix Buffaloes and Tokyo Yakult Swallows playing to a 3–3 draw after 12 innings, lasting 5 hours and 3 minutes, being the most recent Japan Series game to result in a draw.

Even though the Central League is historically more victorious, in recent years, the Pacific League has been catching up in titles. Currently, the Pacific League leads the Central League in overall Japan Series championships, 39 to 38. The Pacific League won eight consecutive Japan Series championships from 2013 to 2020, with six by the Fukuoka SoftBank Hawks, and one each by the Hokkaido Nippon-Ham Fighters and Tohoku Rakuten Golden Eagles. The streak was broken in 2021, with the Tokyo Yakult Swallows beating the Orix Buffaloes.

== List of winners ==
Pacific League team (PL)
Central League team (CL)

| MVP | Japan Series Most Valuable Player Award |
| FSA | Fighting Spirit Award (MVP on the losing team) |

| Year | Winning team | Manager | Series | Losing team | Manager | MVP | FSA |
|---|---|---|---|---|---|---|---|
| 1950 | Mainichi Orions | Yuasa Yoshio | 4–2 | Shochiku Robins | Tokuro Konishi | Kaoru Bettou | Not awarded |
| 1951 | Yomiuri Giants | Shigeru Mizuhara | 4–1 | Nankai Hawks | Kazuto Tsuruoka | Yukou Minamimura | Not awarded |
| 1952 | Yomiuri Giants | Shigeru Mizuhara | 4–2 | Nankai Hawks | Kazuto Tsuruoka | Takehiko Bessho | Not awarded |
| 1953 | Yomiuri Giants | Shigeru Mizuhara | 4–2–1 | Nankai Hawks | Kazuto Tsuruoka | Tetsuharu Kawakami | Hiroshi Minohara |
| 1954 | Chunichi Dragons | Shunichi Amachi | 4–3 | Nishitetsu Lions | Osamu Mihara | Shigeru Sugishita | Hiroshi Oshita |
| 1955 | Yomiuri Giants | Shigeru Mizuhara | 4–3 | Nankai Hawks | Kazuto Tsuruoka | Takehiko Bessho | Ichiro Togawa |
| 1956 | Nishitetsu Lions | Osamu Mihara | 4–2 | Yomiuri Giants | Shigeru Mizuhara | Yasumitsu Toyoda | Kazuhisa Inao* |
| 1957 | Nishitetsu Lions | Osamu Mihara | 4–0–1 | Yomiuri Giants | Shigeru Mizuhara | Hiroshi Oshita | Toshio Miyamoto |
| 1958 | Nishitetsu Lions | Osamu Mihara | 4–3 | Yomiuri Giants | Shigeru Mizuhara | Kazuhisa Inao | Motoshi Fujita |
| 1959 | Nankai Hawks | Kazuto Tsuruoka | 4–0 | Yomiuri Giants | Shigeru Mizuhara | Tadashi Sugiura | Masataka Tsuchiya |
| 1960 | Taiyō Whales | Osamu Mihara | 4–0 | Daimai Orions | Yukio Nishimoto | Akihito Kondo | Kenjiro Tamiya |
| 1961 | Yomiuri Giants | Tetsuharu Kawakami | 4–2 | Nankai Hawks | Kazuto Tsuruoka | Andy Miyamoto | Joe Stanka |
| 1962 | Toei Flyers | Shigeru Mizuhara | 4–2–1 | Hanshin Tigers | Sadayoshi Fujimoto | Masayuki Dobashi; Masayuki Tanemo | Yoshio Yoshida |
| 1963 | Yomiuri Giants | Tetsuharu Kawakami | 4–3 | Nishitetsu Lions | Futoshi Nakanishi | Shigeo Nagashima | Kazuhisa Inao |
| 1964 | Nankai Hawks | Kazuto Tsuruoka | 4–3 | Hanshin Tigers | Sadayoshi Fujimoto | Joe Stanka | Kazuhiro Yamauchi |
| 1965 | Yomiuri Giants | Tetsuharu Kawakami | 4–1 | Nankai Hawks | Kazuto Tsuruoka | Shigeo Nagashima | Nobushige Morishita |
| 1966 | Yomiuri Giants | Tetsuharu Kawakami | 4–2 | Nankai Hawks | Kazuto Tsuruoka | Isao Shibata | Taisuke Watanabe |
| 1967 | Yomiuri Giants | Tetsuharu Kawakami | 4–2 | Hankyu Braves | Yukio Nishimoto | Masaaki Mori | Mitsuhiro Adachi |
| 1968 | Yomiuri Giants | Tetsuharu Kawakami | 4–2 | Hankyu Braves | Yukio Nishimoto | Shigeru Takada | Tokuji Nagaike |
| 1969 | Yomiuri Giants | Tetsuharu Kawakami | 4–2 | Hankyu Braves | Yukio Nishimoto | Shigeo Nagashima | Tokuji Nagaike |
| 1970 | Yomiuri Giants | Tetsuharu Kawakami | 4–1 | Lotte Orions | Wataru Nonin | Shigeo Nagashima | Reiji Iishi |
| 1971 | Yomiuri Giants | Tetsuharu Kawakami | 4–1 | Hankyu Braves | Yukio Nishimoto | Toshimitsu Suetsugu | Hisashi Yamada |
| 1972 | Yomiuri Giants | Tetsuharu Kawakami | 4–1 | Hankyu Braves | Yukio Nishimoto | Tsuneo Horiuchi | Mitsuhiro Adachi |
| 1973 | Yomiuri Giants | Tetsuharu Kawakami | 4–1 | Nankai Hawks | Katsuya Nomura | Tsuneo Horiuchi | Katsuya Nomura |
| 1974 | Lotte Orions | Masaichi Kaneda | 4–2 | Chunichi Dragons | Wally Yonamine | Sumio Hirota | Morimichi Takagi |
| 1975 | Hankyu Braves | Toshiharu Ueda | 4–0–2 | Hiroshima Toyo Carp | Takeshi Koba | Takashi Yamaguchi | Koji Yamamoto |
| 1976 | Hankyu Braves | Toshiharu Ueda | 4–3 | Yomiuri Giants | Shigeo Nagashima | Yutaka Fukumoto | Isao Shibata |
| 1977 | Hankyu Braves | Toshiharu Ueda | 4–1 | Yomiuri Giants | Shigeo Nagashima | Hisashi Yamada | Kazumasa Kono |
| 1978 | Yakult Swallows | Tatsuro Hirooka | 4–3 | Hankyu Braves | Toshiharu Ueda | Katsuo Osugi | Mitsuhiro Adachi |
| 1979 | Hiroshima Toyo Carp | Takeshi Koba | 4–3 | Kintetsu Buffaloes | Yukio Nishimoto | Yoshihiko Takahashi | Takashi Imoto |
| 1980 | Hiroshima Toyo Carp | Takeshi Koba | 4–3 | Kintetsu Buffaloes | Yukio Nishimoto | Jim Lyttle | Toru Ogawa |
| 1981 | Yomiuri Giants | Motoshi Fujita | 4–2 | Nippon-Ham Fighters | Keiji Osawa | Takashi Nishimoto | Hiroaki Inoue |
| 1982 | Seibu Lions | Tatsuro Hirooka | 4–2 | Chunichi Dragons | Sadao Kondo | Osamu Higashio | Seiji Kamikawa |
| 1983 | Seibu Lions | Tatsuro Hirooka | 4–3 | Yomiuri Giants | Motoshi Fujita | Takuji Ota | Takashi Nishimoto |
| 1984 | Hiroshima Toyo Carp | Takeshi Koba | 4–3 | Hankyu Braves | Toshiharu Ueda | Kiyoyuki Nagashima | Yukihiko Yamaoki |
| 1985 | Hanshin Tigers | Yoshio Yoshida | 4–2 | Seibu Lions | Tatsuro Hirooka | Randy Bass | Hiromichi Ishige |
| 1986 | Seibu Lions | Masaaki Mori | 4–3–1 | Hiroshima Toyo Carp | Junro Anan | Kimiyasu Kudo | Mitsuo Tatsukawa |
| 1987 | Seibu Lions | Masaaki Mori | 4–2 | Yomiuri Giants | Sadaharu Oh | Kimiyasu Kudo | Kazunori Shinozuka |
| 1988 | Seibu Lions | Masaaki Mori | 4–1 | Chunichi Dragons | Senichi Hoshino | Hiromichi Ishige | Masaru Uno |
| 1989 | Yomiuri Giants | Motoshi Fujita | 4–3 | Kintetsu Buffaloes | Akira Ohgi | Norihiro Komada | Hiromasa Arai |
| 1990 | Seibu Lions | Masaaki Mori | 4–0 | Yomiuri Giants | Motoshi Fujita | Orestes Destrade | Kaoru Okazaki |
| 1991 | Seibu Lions | Masaaki Mori | 4–3 | Hiroshima Toyo Carp | Koji Yamamoto | Kouji Akiyama | Kazuhisa Kawaguchi |
| 1992 | Seibu Lions | Masaaki Mori | 4–3 | Yakult Swallows | Katsuya Nomura | Takehiro Ishii | Yoichi Okabayashi |
| 1993 | Yakult Swallows | Katsuya Nomura | 4–3 | Seibu Lions | Masaaki Mori | Kenjiro Kawasaki | Kazuhiro Kiyohara |
| 1994 | Yomiuri Giants | Shigeo Nagashima | 4–2 | Seibu Lions | Masaaki Mori | Hiromi Makihara | Kazuhiro Kiyohara |
| 1995 | Yakult Swallows | Katsuya Nomura | 4–1 | Orix BlueWave | Akira Ogi | Tom O'Malley | Hiroshi Kobayashi |
| 1996 | Orix BlueWave | Akira Ogi | 4–1 | Yomiuri Giants | Shigeo Nagashima | Troy Neel | Toshihisa Nishi |
| 1997 | Yakult Swallows | Katsuya Nomura | 4–1 | Seibu Lions | Osamu Higashio | Atsuya Furuta | Kazuo Matsui |
| 1998 | Yokohama BayStars | Hiroshi Gondoh | 4–2 | Seibu Lions | Osamu Higashio | Takanori Suzuki | Koji Otsuka |
| 1999 | Fukuoka Daiei Hawks | Sadaharu Oh | 4–1 | Chunichi Dragons | Senichi Hoshino | Kouji Akiyama | Kenshin Kawakami |
| 2000 | Yomiuri Giants | Shigeo Nagashima | 4–2 | Fukuoka Daiei Hawks | Sadaharu Oh | Hideki Matsui | Kenji Jojima |
| 2001 | Yakult Swallows | Tsutomu Wakamatsu | 4–1 | Osaka Kintetsu Buffaloes | Masataka Nashida | Atsuya Furuta | Tuffy Rhodes |
| 2002 | Yomiuri Giants | Tatsunori Hara | 4–0 | Seibu Lions | Haruki Ihara | Tomohiro Nioka | Alex Cabrera |
| 2003 | Fukuoka Daiei Hawks | Sadaharu Oh | 4–3 | Hanshin Tigers | Senichi Hoshino | Toshiya Sugiuchi | Tomoaki Kanemoto |
| 2004 | Seibu Lions | Tsutomu Itoh | 4–3 | Chunichi Dragons | Hiromitsu Ochiai | Takashi Ishii | Kazuki Inoue |
| 2005 | Chiba Lotte Marines | Bobby Valentine | 4–0 | Hanshin Tigers | Akinobu Okada | Toshiaki Imae | Akihiro Yano |
| 2006 | Hokkaido Nippon-Ham Fighters | Trey Hillman | 4–1 | Chunichi Dragons | Hiromitsu Ochiai | Atsunori Inaba | Kenshin Kawakami |
| 2007 | Chunichi Dragons | Hiromitsu Ochiai | 4–1 | Hokkaido Nippon-Ham Fighters | Trey Hillman | Norihiro Nakamura | Yu Darvish |
| 2008 | Saitama Seibu Lions | Hisanobu Watanabe | 4–3 | Yomiuri Giants | Tatsunori Hara | Takayuki Kishi | Alex Ramírez |
| 2009 | Yomiuri Giants | Tatsunori Hara | 4–2 | Hokkaido Nippon-Ham Fighters | Masataka Nashida | Shinnosuke Abe | Shinji Takahashi |
| 2010 | Chiba Lotte Marines | Norifumi Nishimura | 4–2–1 | Chunichi Dragons | Hiromitsu Ochiai | Toshiaki Imae | Kazuhiro Wada |
| 2011 | Fukuoka SoftBank Hawks | Koji Akiyama | 4–3 | Chunichi Dragons | Hiromitsu Ochiai | Hiroki Kokubo | Kazuhiro Wada |
| 2012 | Yomiuri Giants | Tatsunori Hara | 4–2 | Hokkaido Nippon-Ham Fighters | Hideki Kuriyama | Tetsuya Utsumi | Atsunori Inaba |
| 2013 | Tohoku Rakuten Golden Eagles | Senichi Hoshino | 4–3 | Yomiuri Giants | Tatsunori Hara | Manabu Mima | Hisayoshi Chōno |
| 2014 | Fukuoka SoftBank Hawks | Koji Akiyama | 4–1 | Hanshin Tigers | Yutaka Wada | Seiichi Uchikawa | Randy Messenger |
| 2015 | Fukuoka SoftBank Hawks | Kimiyasu Kudo | 4–1 | Tokyo Yakult Swallows | Mitsuru Manaka | Lee Dae-ho | Tetsuto Yamada |
| 2016 | Hokkaido Nippon-Ham Fighters | Hideki Kuriyama | 4–2 | Hiroshima Toyo Carp | Koichi Ogata | Brandon Laird | Brad Eldred |
| 2017 | Fukuoka SoftBank Hawks | Kimiyasu Kudo | 4–2 | Yokohama DeNA BayStars | Alex Ramírez | Dennis Sarfate | Toshiro Miyazaki |
| 2018 | Fukuoka SoftBank Hawks | Kimiyasu Kudo | 4–1–1 | Hiroshima Toyo Carp | Koichi Ogata | Takuya Kai | Seiya Suzuki |
| 2019 | Fukuoka SoftBank Hawks | Kimiyasu Kudo | 4–0 | Yomiuri Giants | Tatsunori Hara | Yurisbel Gracial | Yoshiyuki Kamei |
| 2020 | Fukuoka SoftBank Hawks | Kimiyasu Kudo | 4–0 | Yomiuri Giants | Tatsunori Hara | Ryoya Kurihara | Shosei Togo |
| 2021 | Tokyo Yakult Swallows | Shingo Takatsu | 4–2 | Orix Buffaloes | Satoshi Nakajima | Yuhei Nakamura | Yoshinobu Yamamoto |
| 2022 | Orix Buffaloes | Satoshi Nakajima | 4–2–1 | Tokyo Yakult Swallows | Shingo Takatsu | Yutaro Sugimoto | José Osuna |
| 2023 | Hanshin Tigers | Akinobu Okada | 4–3 | Orix Buffaloes | Satoshi Nakajima | Koji Chikamoto | Kotaro Kurebayashi |
| 2024 | Yokohama DeNA BayStars | Daisuke Miura | 4–2 | Fukuoka SoftBank Hawks | Hiroki Kokubo | Masayuki Kuwahara | Kenta Imamiya |
| 2025 | Fukuoka SoftBank Hawks | Hiroki Kokubo | 4–1 | Hanshin Tigers | Kyuji Fujikawa | Hotaka Yamakawa | Teruaki Sato |
| 2026 | Fukuoka SoftBank Hawks | Hiroki Kokubo | 4–0 | Yokohama DeNA BayStars | Ryoji Aikawa | Tomoya Masaki | Katsuki Azuma |

Kazuhisa Inao, as an exception, won the Fighting Spirit Award (in 1956) while playing for the victorious Nishitetsu Lions.

=== Extra inning rules ===
Since 2018, there is a limit of 12 innings in the seven regulation games, with games being called tie games if tied after that time. From 1987 to 2020, the innings limit is abolished starting in extra games (Game 8, et al) if necessary. Since 2021, extra games are played to 12 innings as normal. Starting in the 13th inning of extra games, the World Baseball Softball Confederation two-runner tiebreaker with runners at first and second base, similar to the Japanese High School Baseball Championship (Koshien), will be implemented.

Historically:

- Until 1966 (except 1964): Game is called at sunset (all games were played as day games)
  - 1964 (all games at night): No new inning may start after 10:30 p.m.
- 1967–1981: No new inning may start after 5:30 p.m.
- 1982–1986: No new inning may start after the game time reaches four-and-a-half hours
- 1987–1993: 18-inning limit until Game 7, unlimited innings Game 8 and onward (change introduced due to Game 8 being necessary in the 1986 series due to Game 1 being called after 14 innings)
- 1994: 18- (day game) / 15-inning (night game) limit until Game 7, unlimited innings Game 8 and onward
- 1995–2017: / 15-inning limit until Game 7, unlimited innings Game 8 and onward
  - The three-and-a-half hour cut-off rule used in the 2011 regular season was not used for the Japan Series.
- 2018–2020: 12-inning limit until Game 7, unlimited innings Game 8 and onward
- 2021–present: 12-inning limit. Starting in Game 8, further innings played use WBSC two-runner tiebreaker.

== Teams by number of wins ==
| Team | Wins | Losses | Last championship | Last JS appearance |
|---|---|---|---|---|
| Yomiuri Giants | 22 | 14 | 2012 | 2020 |
| Saitama Seibu Lions^{1} | 13 | 8 | 2008 | 2008 |
| Fukuoka SoftBank Hawks^{2} | 13 | 10 | 2026 | 2026 |
| Tokyo Yakult Swallows | 6 | 3 | 2021 | 2022 |
| Orix Buffaloes^{3} | 5 | 10 | 2022 | 2023 |
| Chiba Lotte Marines^{4} | 4 | 2 | 2010 | 2010 |
| Hiroshima Toyo Carp | 3 | 5 | 1984 | 2018 |
| Hokkaido Nippon-Ham Fighters^{5} | 3 | 4 | 2016 | 2016 |
| Yokohama DeNA BayStars^{6} | 3 | 2 | 2024 | 2026 |
| Chunichi Dragons | 2 | 8 | 2007 | 2011 |
| Hanshin Tigers | 2 | 5 | 2023 | 2025 |
| Tohoku Rakuten Golden Eagles | 1 | 0 | 2013 | 2013 |
| Osaka Kintetsu Buffaloes^{7} | 0 | 4 | | 2001 |
| Shochiku Robins^{8} | 0 | 1 | | 1950 |

^{1}The franchise currently known as the Saitama Seibu Lions had a Japan Series record of 3–2 as the Nishitetsu Lions.
^{2}The franchise currently known as the Fukuoka SoftBank Hawks had a Japan Series record of 2–8 as the Nankai Hawks, and 2–1 as the Fukuoka Daiei Hawks.
^{3}The franchise currently known as the Orix Buffaloes had a Japan Series record of 3–7 as the Hankyu Braves, and 1–1 as the Orix BlueWave. It took its current name in 2005 after merging with the Osaka Kintetsu Buffaloes.
^{4}The franchise currently known as the Chiba Lotte Marines had a Japan Series record of 1–0 as the Mainichi Orions, 0–1 as the Daimai Orions, and 1–1 as the Lotte Orions.
^{5}The franchise currently known as the Hokkaido Nippon-Ham Fighters had a Japan Series record of 1–0 as the Toei Flyers.
^{6}The franchise has a Japan Series record of 1–0 as Yokohama Baystars and 1–0 as the Taiyō Whales.
^{7}The Osaka Kintetsu Buffaloes were merged with the Orix BlueWave in 2005 to form the Orix Buffaloes.
^{8}The Shochiku Robins were merged with the Taiyō Whales in 1953, eventually becoming the Yokohama DeNA BayStars.

== Leagues by number of wins ==
| Central League | 38–38 | Pacific League |

== Managers with multiple championships ==
Since 1950, fifteen managers have won the Japan Series multiple times. Osamu Mihara (Whales, Lions), Shigeru Mizuhara (Giants, Flyers), and Tatsuro Hirooka (Swallows, Lions) are the only managers to have multiple teams to wins in the Japan Series. In terms of pennants, eight managers have won a league pennant with multiple teams: Katsuya Nomura, Sadaharu Oh, Shigeru Mizuhara, Osamu Mihara, Tatusro Hirooka, Masataka Nashida, Yukio Nishimoto, and Senichi Hoshino. Nishimoto and Hoshino are the only ones to lead three different teams to the Japan Series.

| Manager | Championships |
|---|---|
| Tetsuharu Kawakami | 11 |
| Masaaki Mori | 6 |
| Shigeru Mizuhara | 5 |
| Kimiyasu Kudo | 5 |
| Osamu Mihara | 4 |
| Toshiharu Ueda | 3 |
| Tatsuro Hirooka | 3 |
| Tatsunori Hara | 3 |
| Takeshi Koba | 3 |
| Katsuya Nomura | 3 |
| Shigeo Nagashima | 2 |
| Sadaharu Oh | 2 |
| Motoshi Fujita | 2 |
| Koji Akiyama | 2 |
| Kazuto Tsuruoka | 2 |

== Streaks and droughts ==
- The Yomiuri Giants won nine consecutive Japan Series championships from 1965 to 1973. The second-longest streak is four consecutive championships, accomplished by the Fukuoka SoftBank Hawks from 2017 to 2020. Three consecutive championships have been accomplished by the Yomiuri Giants (1951–1953), the Nishitetsu Lions (1956–1958), the Hankyu Braves (1975–1977), and twice by the Seibu Lions (1986–1988 and 1990–1992).
- The Yomiuri Giants also won five consecutive Central League pennants from 1955 to 1959, and 19 of the 23 Central League pennants from 1951 to 1973. The Giants also won two or three consecutive Central League pennants on several other occasions. The other teams to win consecutive Central League pennants are the Hiroshima Toyo Carp (1979–1980 and 2016–2018), the Yakult Swallows (1992–1993 and 2021–2022), and the Chunichi Dragons (2006–2007 and 2010–2011).
- The Nankai Hawks won three consecutive Pacific League pennants twice (1951–1953 and 1964–1966). The Hankyu Braves won nine of the 12 Pacific League pennants from 1967 to 1978, including three consecutive (1967–1969) and four consecutive (1975–1978). The Seibu Lions won 11 of the 14 Pacific League pennants from 1985 to 1998, including four consecutive (1985–1988) and five consecutive (1990–1994). The Orix Buffaloes are the most recent team to win three consecutive Pacific League pennants (2021–2023).
- Franchises have gone 20 years or more without a Japan Series championship over the following intervals:
  - Osaka Kintetsu Buffaloes, 55 years (1950–2004, the entire franchise history; the drought extends to 72 years if one includes the history of the merged Orix Buffaloes, who finally won the 2022 Japan Series).
  - Chunichi Dragons, 52 years (1955–2006)
  - Toei Flyers / Nippon-Ham Fighters, 43 years (1963–2005)
  - Hiroshima Toyo Carp, 42 years (1985–present)
  - Taiyo Whales / Yokohama BayStars, 37 years (1961–1997)
  - Hanshin Tigers, 38 years (1986–2022)
  - Hanshin Tigers, 35 years (1950–1984)
  - Nankai/Fukuoka Hawks, 34 years (1965–1998)
  - Lotte Orions / Chiba Lotte Marines, 30 years (1975–2004)
  - Hiroshima Toyo Carp, 29 years (1950–1978)
  - Kokutetsu Swallows / Sankei Atoms / Yakult Swallows, 28 years (1950–1977)
  - Yokohama BayStars / Yokohama DeNA BayStars, 28 years (1999–2024)
  - Hankyu Braves, 25 years (1950–1974)
  - Mainichi/Daimai/Tokyo/Lotte Orions, 23 years (1951–1973)
  - Nishitetsu Lions / Seibu Lions, 24 years (1959–1981)
- Franchises have gone 20 years or more without a league pennant over the following intervals:
  - Taiyo Whales / Yokohama BayStars, 38 years (1961–1997)
  - Lotte Orions / Chiba Lotte Marines, 31 years (1975–2004)
  - Yokohama BayStars / Yokohama DeNA BayStars, 26 years (1998–2024)
  - Osaka Kintetsu Buffaloes, 30 years (1950–1978)
  - Hiroshima Toyo Carp, 26 years (1950–1974)
  - Nankai/Fukuoka Hawks, 26 years (1974–1998)
  - Nippon-Ham Fighters, 25 years (1982–2005)
  - Hiroshima Toyo Carp, 25 years (1992–2015)
  - Hanshin Tigers, 21 years (1965–1984)

== Individual awards ==
Two individual awards are given out at the conclusion of the Japan Series: the Most Valuable Player Award, given to the most impactful player on the winning team; and the Fighting Spirit Award, given to the most impactful player on the losing team. As stated above, the FSA was only given to a player on the winning team once; Kazuhisa Inao won it in 1956, despite being on the winning side, the Nishitetsu Lions.

Six players have won the Japan Series MVP Award and gone on to become a manager in the Japan Series: Hiroki Kokubo, Kimiyasu Kudo, Masaaki Mori, Osamu Higashio, Shigeo Nagashima, and Tetsuharu Kawakami; of those six, five (Kudo, Mori, Nagashima, Kawakami, Kokubo) have won a MVP Award as a player and won a Japan Series as a manager.

Eight players have won both the MVP Award and the Fighting Spirit Award: Hiromichi Ishige, Hiroshi Oshita, Hisashi Yamada, Isao Shibata, Joe Stanka, Kazuhisa Inao, Atsunori Inaba, and Takashi Nishimoto.

Players to have won the Fighting Spirit Award multiple times include: Mitsuhiro Adachi (3), Kazuhiro Kiyohara, Kazuhiro Wada, Kazuhisa Inao, Kenshin Kawakami, and Tokuji Nagaike (2 each).

== See also ==
- Nippon Professional Baseball
- Asia Series
