= 1972 Japan Series =

Team (Wins)	Managers	Season
Yomiuri Giants (4)	Tetsuharu Kawakami	74–52–4 (.587), 3½ GA
Hankyu Braves (1)	Yukio Nishimoto	80–48–2 (.625), 14 GA
- Dates: October 21–28
- MVP: Tsuneo Horiuchi (Yomiuri)
- FSA: Mitsuhiro Adachi (Hankyu)

The 1972 Japan Series was the championship series of Nippon Professional Baseball (NPB) for the 1972 season. The 23rd edition of the Series, it was a best-of-seven playoff that matched the Central League champion Yomiuri Giants against the Pacific League champion Hankyu Braves. This was the fifth time in the last six years that the two teams had met in the Japan Series, with the Giants having won all previous matchups. The Giants defeated the Braves in five games to win their eighth consecutive title. This was the last of the original run of the Japan Series to match two pennant winners against each other, as the Pacific League soon instituted a playoff system.

== Summary ==
Game	Score	Date	Location	Attendance
1	Giants – 5, Braves – 3	October 21	Korakuen Stadium	38,010
2	Giants – 6, Braves – 4	October 23	Korakuen Stadium	39,666
3	Braves – 5, Giants – 3	October 25	Hankyu Nishinomiya Stadium	34,582
4	Braves – 1, Giants – 3	October 26	Hankyu Nishinomiya Stadium	31,129
5	Braves – 3, Giants – 8	October 28	Hankyu Nishinomiya Stadium	27,269

== See also ==
- 1972 World Series
