= 1967 Japan Series =

Team (Wins)	Managers	Season
Yomiuri Giants (4)	Tetsuharu Kawakami	84–46–4 (.646), 12 GA
Hankyu Braves (2)	Yukio Nishimoto	75–55–4 (.577), 9 GA
- Dates: October 21–28
- MVP: Masaaki Mori (Yomiuri)
- FSA: Mitsuhiro Adachi (Hankyu)

The 1967 Japan Series was the championship series of Nippon Professional Baseball (NPB) for the 1967 season. The 18th edition of the Series, it was a best-of-seven playoff that matched the Central League champion Yomiuri Giants against the Pacific League champion Hankyu Braves. The Giants defeated the Braves in six games to win their third consecutive championship.

== Summary ==
CL Yomiuri Giants (4) vs. PL Hankyu Braves (2)

Game	Date	Score	Location	Time	Attendance
1	October 21	Hankyu Braves – 3, Yomiuri Giants – 7	Hankyu Nishinomiya Stadium	2:51	35,455
2	October 22	Hankyu Braves – 0, Yomiuri Giants – 1	Hankyu Nishinomiya Stadium	3:10	37,591
3	October 24	Yomiuri Giants – 6, Hankyu Braves – 1	Korakuen Stadium	2:34	26,739
4	October 25	Yomiuri Giants – 5, Hankyu Braves – 9	Korakuen Stadium	2:43	29,447
5	October 26	Yomiuri Giants – 3, Hankyu Braves – 6	Korakuen Stadium	3:14	29,654
6	October 28	Hankyu Braves – 3, Yomiuri Giants – 9	Hankyu Nishinomiya Stadium	3:25	18,601

== See also ==
- 1967 World Series
