= 1983 Nippon Professional Baseball season =

1983 NPB season
- League: Nippon Professional Baseball
- Sport: Baseball

Regular season
- Season MVP: CL: Tatsunori Hara (YOM); PL: Osamu Higashio (SEI)

League postseason
- CL champions: Yomiuri Giants
- CL runners-up: Hiroshima Toyo Carp
- PL champions: Seibu Lions
- PL runners-up: Hankyu Braves

Japan Series
- Champions: Seibu Lions
- Runners-up: Yomiuri Giants
- Finals MVP: Takuji Ota (SEI)

NPB seasons
- ← 1982 1984 →

The 1983 Nippon Professional Baseball season was the 34th season of operation for the league. The Pacific League changed their playoff system for the season, which would see the first-place team play the second-place team in a playoff if they finished within five games of each other. The system, which never ended up being used in three straight seasons, was discontinued in 1985.

== Regular season standings ==
=== Central League ===
Central League	G	W	L	T	Pct.	GB
Yomiuri Giants	130	72	50	8	.590	–
Hiroshima Toyo Carp	130	65	55	10	.542	6.0
Yokohama Taiyo Whales	130	61	61	8	.500	11.0
Hanshin Tigers	130	62	63	5	.496	11.5
Chunichi Dragons	130	54	69	7	.439	18.5
Yakult Swallows	130	53	69	8	.434	19.0

=== Pacific League ===
Pacific League	G	W	L	T	Pct.	GB
Seibu Lions	130	86	40	4	.683	–
Hankyu Braves	130	67	55	8	.549	17.0
Nippon-Ham Fighters	130	64	59	7	.520	20.5
Kintetsu Buffaloes	130	52	65	13	.444	29.5
Nankai Hawks	130	52	69	9	.430	31.5
Lotte Orions	130	43	76	11	.361	39.5

== Japan Series ==
Seibu Lions won the series 4–3.

Game	Score	Date	Location	Attendance
1	Lions – 6, Giants – 3	October 29	Seibu Lions Stadium	32,954
2	Lions – 0, Giants – 4	October 30	Seibu Lions Stadium	33,696
3	Giants – 5, Lions – 4	November 1	Korakuen Stadium	40,279
4	Giants – 4, Lions – 7	November 2	Korakuen Stadium	43,436
5	Giants – 5, Lions – 2	November 3	Korakuen Stadium	43,500
6	Lions – 4, Giants – 3	November 5	Seibu Lions Stadium	31,396
7	Lions – 3, Giants – 2	November 7	Seibu Lions Stadium	33,242

== See also ==
- 1983 Major League Baseball season
