= 1983 Japan Series =

Championship series of Nippon Professional Baseball

Team (Wins)	Managers	Season
Seibu Lions (4)	Tatsuro Hirooka	86–40–4 (.683), GA: 17
Yomiuri Giants (3)	Motoshi Fujita	72–50–8 (.590), GA: 6
- Dates: October 29 – November 6
- MVP: Takuji Ota (Seibu)
- FSA: Takashi Nishimoto (Yomiuri)

The 1983 Japan Series was the championship series of Nippon Professional Baseball (NPB) for the 1983 season. The 34th edition of the Series, it was a best-of-seven playoff that matched the Central League champion Yomiuri Giants against the Pacific League champion Seibu Lions. For 1983 to 1985, the Pacific League had a conditional playoff system that would only occur if the first place team won the league by five games or less over the second place team, but it ended up never being used. The Lions won the series in seven games and captured their second consecutive Japan Series title.

== Summary ==
Game	Score	Date	Location	Attendance
1	Lions – 6, Giants – 3	October 29	Seibu Lions Stadium	32,954
2	Lions – 0, Giants – 4	October 30	Seibu Lions Stadium	33,696
3	Giants – 5, Lions – 4	November 1	Korakuen Stadium	40,279
4	Giants – 4, Lions – 7	November 2	Korakuen Stadium	43,436
5	Giants – 5, Lions – 2	November 3	Korakuen Stadium	43,500
6	Lions – 4, Giants – 3	November 5	Seibu Lions Stadium	31,396
7	Lions – 3, Giants – 2	November 6	Seibu Lions Stadium	33,242

== See also ==
- 1983 World Series
