= Akira Ohgi =

Japanese baseball player, coach, and manager

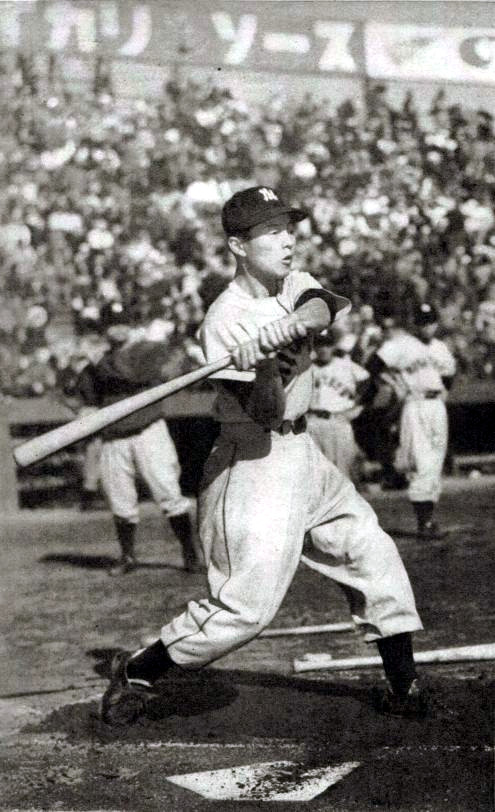
- Akira Ohgi in 1955
- Second baseman
- Born: April 29, 1935; Nakama, Fukuoka, Japan
- Died: December 15, 2005 (aged 70); Fukuoka, Fukuoka, Japan
- Batted: Right Threw: Right

NPB debut
- March 27, 1954, for the Nishitetsu Lions

Last NPB appearance
- 1967, for the Nishitetsu Lions

NPB statistics (through 1967)
- Batting average: .229
- Home runs: 70
- Hits: 800
- Managerial record: 988–815–53
- Stats at Baseball Reference

Teams
- As player: Nishitetsu Lions (1954–1968); As manager: Kintetsu Buffaloes (1988–1992); Orix BlueWave/Orix Buffaloes (1994–2001, 2005); As coach: Nishitetsu Lions (1968–1969); Kintetsu Buffaloes (1970–1987)

Career highlights and awards
- As player: 3x Japan Series champion (1956–1958); Best Nine Award (1960); NPB All-Star (1961); As manager: Japan Series champion (1996); Matsutaro Shoriki Award (1996)

Member of the Japanese

Baseball Hall of Fame
- Induction: 2004

Akira Ohgi (仰木 彬, Ohgi Akira; April 29, 1935 – December 15, 2005) was a professional Japanese baseball player, coach, and manager. He played second base for the Nishitetsu Lions from 1954 to 1968. He became a coach in 1968 for the Lions before being hired to coach the Kintetsu Buffaloes in 1970. He was promoted to manager in 1988 and managed five seasons before initially retiring. He then managed the Orix BlueWave from 1994 to 2001 before being brought back to manage the now Orix Buffaloes in 2005. Less than two months after the season ended, Ohgi died.

== Career ==
Ohgi was a member of the Nishitetsu Lions, who won three championships in the late 1950s. After his playing career ended, Ohgi became a coach in 1968. In 1970, he was hired to coach for the Kintetsu Buffaloes, where he served for eighteen seasons before being promoted to manager in 1988. He managed the team for five seasons, which saw them win the Pacific League pennant in 1989. In the 1989 Japan Series, the Buffaloes were up 3-0 before losing the next four games to the Yomiuri Giants to make them the third (and currently last) NPB team to lose the Japan Series after being up 3-0. He initially announced his retirement after the 1992 season, but he returned to the majors in 1994 to manage the Orix BlueWave. He managed them for eight seasons, where they won the Pacific pennant in 1995 and 1996 to go with a Japan Series title in 1996. He was fired in 2001 but returned for the 2005 season of the now-merged Orix Buffaloes.

Described as a "non-conformist" type of manager, he won the league pennant three times and won the Japan Series once in 1996; he was noted for trusting his players, most notably allowing Hideo Nomo to set his own training regimen and Ichiro Suzuki to keep his batting swing while also having him bat in the leadoff position and listed by his first name; Ichiro proceeded to bat over .300 in every season he played under Ohgi. He was elected to the Japanese Baseball Hall of Fame in 2004.
