= Tatsuro Hirooka =

Japanese baseball player and manager (born 1932)

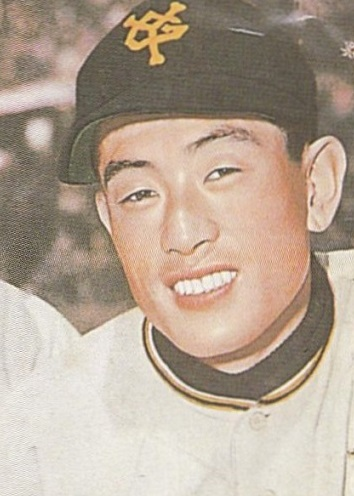
- Hirooka in 1958
- Shortstop / Manager
- Born: February 9, 1932 (age 94); Kure, Hiroshima, Japan
- Batted: Right Threw: Right

debut
- 1954, for the Yomiuri Giants

Last appearance
- 1966, for the Yomiuri Giants

Career statistics
- Batting average: .240
- Home runs: 117
- Hits: 1,081

Teams
- As player: Yomiuri Giants (1954–1966); As coach: Yomiuri Giants (1961–1966); Hiroshima Toyo Carp (1970–1971); Yakult Swallows (1974–1976); As manager: Yakult Swallows (1976–1979); Seibu Lions (1982–1985)

Career highlights and awards
- As player: Central League Rookie of the Year (1954); 5x Japan Series champion (1955, 1961, 1963, 1965, 1966); As manager: 3x Japan Series champion (1978, 1982, 1983); 2x Matsutaro Shoriki Award-winner (1978, 1982)

Member of the Japanese

Baseball Hall of Fame
- Induction: 1992

Tatsuro Hirooka (広岡 達朗, Hirooka Tatsurō born February 9, 1932) is a Japanese retired professional baseball player and manager.

Hirooka played his entire career, from 1954 to 1966, for the Yomiuri Giants. He was awarded the Central League rookie of the year award in 1954. From 1961 to 1966, Hirooka was a player-coach for the Giants.

As a manager for the Yakult Swallows (1976–1979) and then the Seibu Lions (1982–1985), Hirooka was known for his tough-love style. Nicknamed "The Iron Shogun", he thrice led his teams to the Japan Series championship — in 1978, 1982, and 1983. With his championships for Yakult and Seibu, he is the third and currently last manager to win the Japan Series with multiple teams. He won the Matsutaro Shoriki Award — presented to a person (a manager or player) who greatly contributes to the development of professional baseball — in 1978 and 1982. He was inducted into the Japanese Baseball Hall of Fame in 1992.
