= 1969 Japan Series =

Team (Wins)	Managers	Season
Yomiuri Giants (4)	Tetsuharu Kawakami	73–51–6 (.589), 6½ GA
Hankyu Braves (2)	Yukio Nishimoto	76–50–4 (.603), 2 GA
- Dates: October 26 – November 2
- MVP: Shigeo Nagashima (Yomiuri)
- FSA: Tokuji Nagaike (Hankyu)

The 1969 Japan Series was the championship series of Nippon Professional Baseball (NPB) for the 1969 season. The 20th edition of the Series, it was a best-of-seven playoff that matched the Central League champion Yomiuri Giants against the Pacific League champion Hankyu Braves. This was the third consecutive meeting between the two teams in the Japan Series, with the previous two matchups being won by the Giants. Yomiuri defeated Hankyu once again in six games to capture their fifth consecutive championship. Shigeo Nagashima became the first (and so far only) player to win the Japan Series MVP Award for a third time, doing so while batting .409 with four home runs and six RBIs for the Giants.

== Summary ==
Game	Score	Date	Location	Attendance
1	Braves – 5, Giants – 6	October 26	Hankyu Nishinomiya Stadium	32,831
2	Braves – 2, Giants – 1	October 27	Hankyu Nishinomiya Stadium	24,106
3	Giants – 7, Braves – 3	October 29	Korakuen Stadium	31,088
4	Giants – 9, Braves – 4	October 30	Korakuen Stadium	29,900
5	Giants – 3, Braves – 5	October 31	Korakuen Stadium	29,197
6	Giants – 9, Braves – 2	November 2	Hankyu Nishinomiya Stadium	33,242

== See also ==
- 1969 World Series
