= 1970 Japan Series =

Team (Wins)	Managers	Season
Yomiuri Giants (4)	Tetsuharu Kawakami	79–47–4 (.627), 2 GA
Lotte Orions (1)	Wataru Nonin	80–47–3 (.630), 10½ GA
- Dates: October 27 – November 2
- MVP: Shigeo Nagashima (Yomiuri)
- FSA: Reiji Iishi (Lotte)

The 1970 Japan Series was the championship series for Nippon Professional Baseball (NPB) for the 1970 season. The 21st edition of the Series, it was a best-of-seven playoff that matched the Central League champion Yomiuri Giants against the Pacific League champion Lotte Orions. The Giants defeated the Orions in five games to win their sixth consecutive championship.

== Summary ==
Game	Score	Date	Location	Attendance
1	Giants – 1, Orions – 0	October 27	Korakuen Stadium	33,209
2	Giants – 6, Orions – 3	October 29	Korakuen Stadium	31,609
3	Orions – 3, Giants – 5	October 31	Tokyo Stadium	26,542
4	Orions – 6, Giants – 5	November 1	Tokyo Stadium	31,515
5	Orions – 2, Giants – 6	November 2	Tokyo Stadium	31,281

== See also ==
- 1970 World Series
