= Takeshi Koba =

Japanese baseball player and manager (1936–2021)

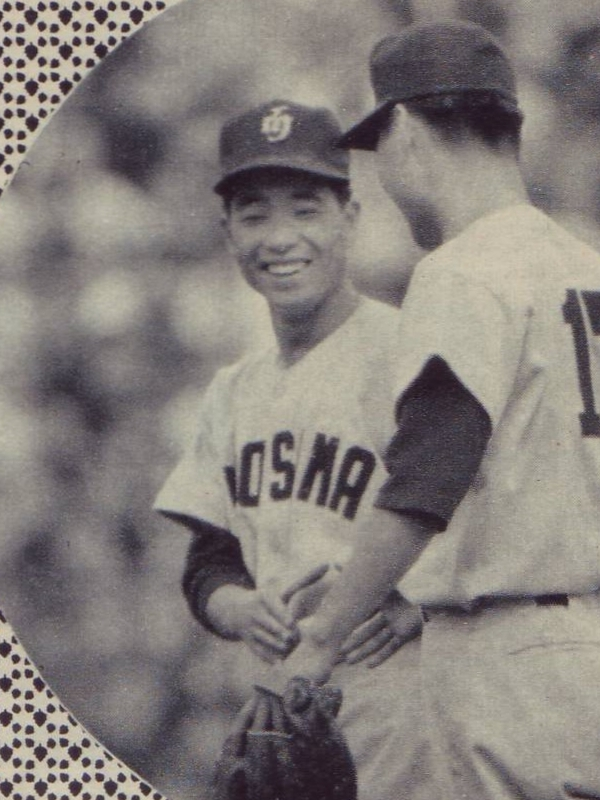
- Picture of Takeshi Koba in 1959
- Infielder/Manager
- Born: April 22, 1936; Kumamoto, Japan
- Died: November 12, 2021 (aged 85)
- Batted: Right Threw: Right

debut
- 1958, for the Hiroshima Carp

Career statistics
- Batting average: .252
- Home runs: 44
- Hits: 334
- Stolen bases: 263
- Stats at Baseball Reference

Teams
- As player: Hiroshima Carp (1958–1969); Nankai Hawks (1970); As manager: Hiroshima Carp (1975–1985); Taiyo Whales (1987–1989)

Career highlights and awards
- As player: 2x Central League Stolen Base leader (1964, 1968); As manager: 3× Japan Series Champion (1979, 1980, 1984)

Member of the Japanese

Baseball Hall of Fame
- Induction: 1999

Takeshi Koba (古葉 竹識, Koba Takeshi; April 22, 1936 – November 12, 2021) was a professional baseball player and manager in Japan, and the manager of Tokyo International University's baseball team.

== Early life ==
Because baseball was popular in the city, Koba started playing it when he was in primary school. Soon he dreamed of becoming a professional baseball player.

In 1952, he went on to Seseiko high school, which had a good baseball team. The next year, he participated in the Koshien tournament, which is the national tournament of high school baseball. After he graduated from high school, he went on to Senshu University but soon after his entering university, his father died. In order to make up for the deficit in the living expenses of his family, he left the university and obtained a job. At the same time, his dream took on a financial overtone as well since baseball players' salaries were very high.

== Playing career ==
In 1958, three years after he started working, with the help of the manager of his team, he became a professional baseball player for the Hiroshima Carp, a Japanese professional baseball team belonging to the Central League, with the uniform number 29. In 1959, his second year as a professional baseball player, his uniform number was changed from 29 to 1 and he secured a regular position at shortstop. He continued to be a regular player until 1968.

In 1963, he participated in the all-star game for the first time, and in the regular season he was a leading contestant for the leading hitter, together with Shigeo Nagashima, who was the main batter of the Yomiuri Giants, another Japanese professional baseball team. However, in the final phase of the baseball season, he was hit by a pitch in the face and was sent to a hospital. As a result, he ended in second place with a batting average of .339, which was his best record. After the year, he came to be afraid of inside pitches and therefore he remained in a long slump in batting. Instead, he found a means of survival in his ability for baserunning, especially steals.

In 1964 and 1968, he led in the number of steals in the Central League. The focus on baserunning later had a great influence on his own strategy as manager.

In 1970, he was traded to the Nankai Hawks, which was also one of the Japanese teams but belonged to the other league, the Pacific League. In 1971, he retired and was appointed a coach.

== Managing career ==
After working for two years as the Hawks' coach and for one year as the Carp's coach, he was assigned in 1975 to the manager post of the Carp because Joe Lutz, who was the manager at the time, left the team in April, during the baseball season. That year, he led the Carp to become the league champion for the first time in the team's 26-year-long history. He has said that during the year there were mysterious events around him. For example, bluebirds, which are considered the symbol of happiness in Japan, came to his birdcage.

In 1979, 1980, and 1984 he led the team to win the league championship again and moreover to win the Japan championship. At the end of the season of 1985, he left the team. As of 2009, he is the only manager who has led the Carp to win the Japan championship.

As a manager, he put special emphasis on baserunning. For the 11 years he was the manager, the number of the steals made by the team in one season exceeded 100 11 times. Also, he trained "utility players", players who can serve as both an infielder and an outfielder, in order to make the best use of a limited number of players. In addition, he requested that the owner of the team build indoor training rooms, which did not exist in the world of Japanese baseball in those days. With them, players can train even on rainy days. As a result of these policies, during the 11 years he led the Carp, the Carp became the top-class, which means the first place, second place, or third place, nine times, the league champion four times, the Japan champion three times.

In 1987, he assumed the manager post of the Taiyo Whales, which was another Japanese professional baseball team, on a five-year contract because he was thought highly of as a result of his work with the Carp. However, he retired from the post at the end of the season of 1989 because he could not bring the team to the top class.

His 873 wins as a manager put him into 14th place on the all-time list of Japanese professional baseball.

== After retirement from professional baseball ==
After he retired from the manager post of the Whales, he became a baseball commentator, and also the chairman of the International Boys Baseball Association Japan, which has been working to popularize baseball in countries in which baseball is not so popular as Japan. In 1999, he was selected as a member of the Japanese Baseball Hall of Fame, which admits people who have rendered distinguished service to the world of Japanese baseball.

Since February 2008, he has been the manager of the baseball team of Tokyo International University. As there had been no ex-professional manager serving as the manager of the baseball team of a university for 61 years, his adoption of the manager role at the university was reported in not only sports newspapers but also some general newspapers.
