= Tatsunori Hara =

Japanese baseball manager (born 1958)

Tatsunori Hara 原 辰徳
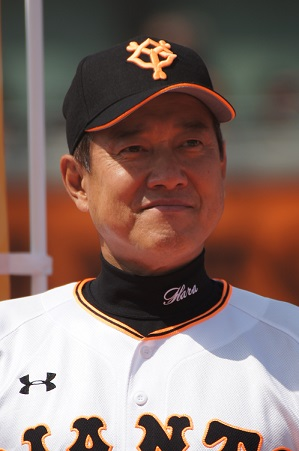
- Hara in 2015
- Infielder/Manager
- Born: July 22, 1958 (age 67); Sagamihara, Kanagawa, Japan
- Batted: Right Threw: Right

NPB debut
- April 4, 1981, for the Yomiuri Giants

Last NPB appearance
- October 8, 1995, for the Yomiuri Giants

NPB statistics
- Batting average: .279
- Hits: 1,675
- Home runs: 382
- RBIs: 1,093
- Managerial record: 795–595–51
- Winning %: .572
- Stats at Baseball Reference

Teams
- As player: Yomiuri Giants (1981–1995); As manager: Yomiuri Giants (2002–2003, 2006–2015, 2019–2023); Japan national team (2009); As coach: Yomiuri Giants (1999–2001)

Career highlights and awards
- As player: Central League Rookie of the Year (1981); Central League MVP (1983); 3× Japan Series champion (1981, 1989, 1994); 5x Best Nine Award (1983, 1987, 1988, 1990, 1991); As manager: 3× Japan Series champion (2002, 2009, 2012)

Member of the Japanese

Baseball Hall of Fame
- Induction: 2018

Tatsunori Hara (原 辰徳, Hara Tatsunori; born July 22, 1958) is a Japanese former professional baseball infielder and manager. He played 15 seasons in Nippon Professional Baseball (NPB) for the Yomiuri Giants, and also spent 17 seasons as the club's manager.

== Playing career ==
Hara was born in Sagamihara, Kanagawa. He played for the Giants during his professional baseball career from 1981 to 1995. He won the Central League Rookie of the Year award in 1981 and the Central League MVP in 1983. A hugely popular member of the Giants, during his playing career he was frequently the subject of newspaper, magazines, and television profiles.

== Coaching career ==
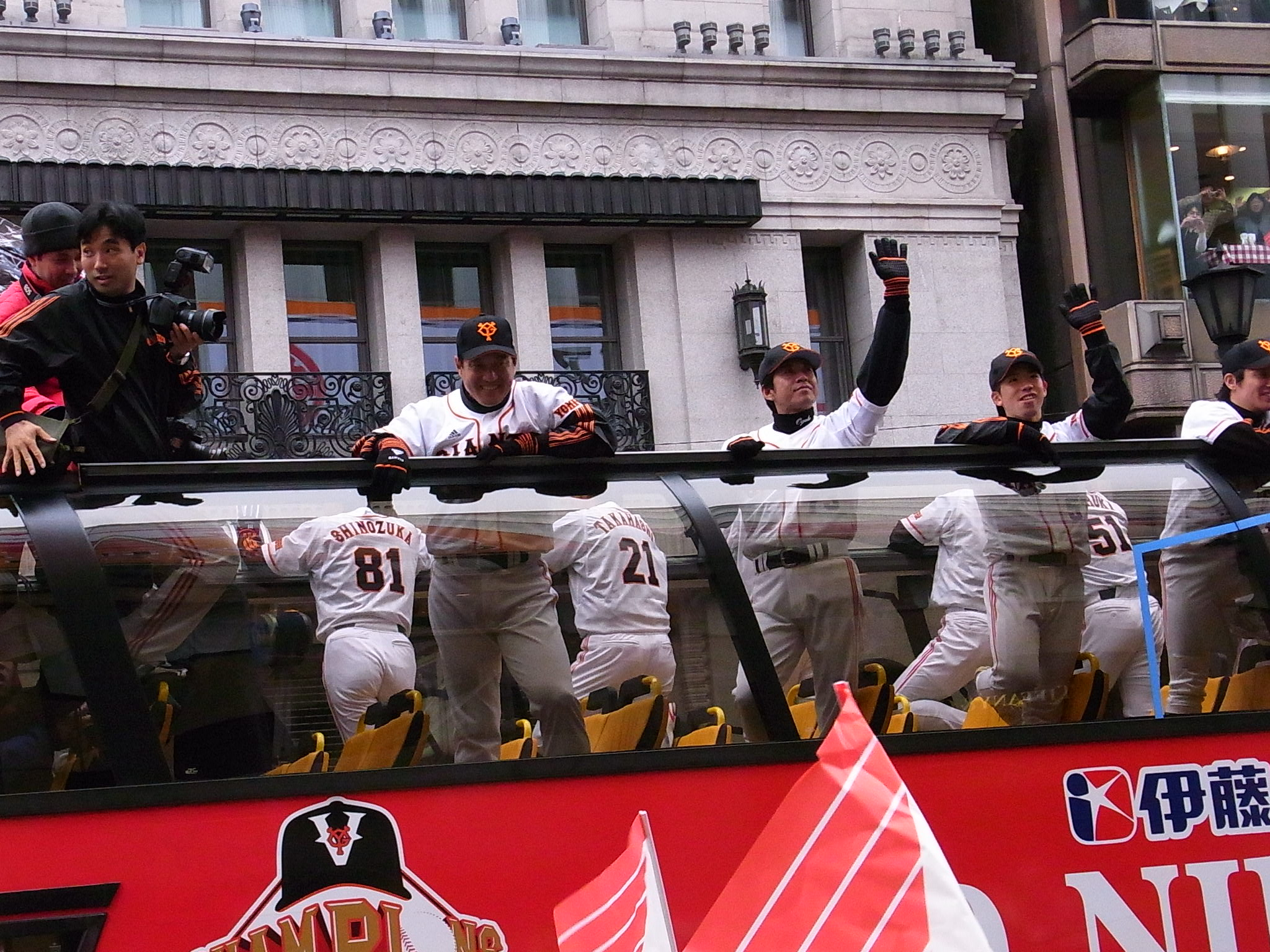
Tatsunori Hara and all Tokyo Giants player and coach take 2009 Japan Series Baseball celebrate parade in Ginza, Tokyo, Japan

Hara previously managed the Giants from 2002 to 2003, and again from 2006 until his abrupt resignation at the end of the 2015 season. During those tenures, he led the Giants to seven Central League pennants and three Japan Series championships. In October 2018, he was rehired as Giants manager for three seasons after Yoshinobu Takahashi announced his intention to step down.

Hara led the Japan national baseball team to victory in the final of the 2009 World Baseball Classic.

On July 30, 2019, Hara won his 1,000th game as a manager after the Giants beat the Hiroshima Carp, becoming the 13th manager in the history of the NPB to win 1,000 games.

On October 4, 2023, Hara announced that he would again be stepping down as manager, and named Shinnosuke Abe as his replacement. In his total tenure as a manager, he won 1,220 games while losing 355 games with 89 ties.

== As result for player era ==
Results of player era by season
	League																							
Club	Year	G	BB	BN	RUN	Hit	2BH	3BH	HR	TB	RBI	SB	SBH	Sbp	SF	WAL	IBB	DB	SO	DP	BA	OBP	SLG	OPS
Tokyo Giants	1981	125	507	470	64	126	23	6	22	227	67	6	6	0	7	27	0	3	78	9	.268	.308	.483	.791
Tokyo Giants	1982	130	542	494	81	136	19	1	33	256	92	11	6	0	4	42	4	2	82	6	.275	.332	.518	.850
Tokyo Giants	1983	130	571	500	94	151	32	4	32	287	103	9	4	0	8	60	1	3	56	11	.302	.375	.574	.949
Tokyo Giants	1984	130	543	468	72	130	19	1	27	232	81	7	3	1	4	67	3	3	58	8	.278	.369	.496	.865
Tokyo Giants	1985	124	521	441	79	125	23	2	34	254	94	7	3	2	8	60	2	10	42	6	.283	.376	.576	.952
Tokyo Giants	1986	113	467	406	70	115	21	3	36	250	80	7	2	1	6	52	4	2	57	8	.283	.363	.616	.978
Tokyo Giants	1987	123	489	433	80	133	17	3	34	258	95	7	2	0	7	44	6	5	61	11	.307	.372	.596	.968
Tokyo Giants	1988	126	529	467	79	140	24	1	31	259	81	5	6	0	0	61	6	1	63	14	.300	.382	.555	.936
Tokyo Giants	1989	114	459	395	60	103	22	0	25	200	74	3	3	0	2	60	4	2	68	6	.261	.359	.506	.866
Tokyo Giants	1990	103	425	366	58	111	17	1	20	190	68	6	4	0	4	52	3	3	64	4	.303	.391	.519	.910
Tokyo Giants	1991	127	524	455	66	122	13	1	29	224	86	5	3	0	12	55	1	2	82	71	.268	.342	.492	.834
Tokyo Giants	1992	117	493	437	61	119	17	1	28	222	77	4	3	0	3	46	1	7	71	13	.272	.349	.508	.857
Tokyo Giants	1993	98	387	336	28	77	14	0	11	124	44	3	2	0	3	44	1	4	62	9	.229	.323	.369	.692
Tokyo Giants	1994	67	227	200	26	58	4	1	14	106	36	0	2	2	1	22	1	2	21	5	.290	.364	.530	.894
Tokyo Giants	1995	70	160	144	13	29	8	0	6	55	15	2	1	1	1	13	1	1	29	5	.201	.270	.382	.652
Tokyo Giants	Career total	1697	6844	6012	931	1675	273	25	382	3144	1093	82	50	7	70	705	38	50	894	122	.279	.355	.523	.878

Sourse:Nippon Professional Baseball

== As result for team manager era ==
Results of league competitions by season
	League													
Club	Year	Pos	Game	W	L	D	WA	GD	HR	BA	ERA	S	C	D
Tokyo Giants	2002	1st	140	86	52	2	.623	(11.0)	186	.272	3.04	691	485	206
Tokyo Giants	2003	3rd	140	71	66	3	.518	15.5	205	.262	4.43	654	681	-27
Tokyo Giants	2006	4th	146	65	79	2	.451	23.5	134	.251	3.65	552	592	-40
Tokyo Giants	2007	1st[Note 1]	144	80	63	1	.559	(1.5)	191	.276	3.58	692	556	136
Tokyo Giants	2008	1ST	144	84	57	3	.596	(2.0)	177	.266	3.37	631	532	99
Tokyo Giants	2009	1st	144	89	46	9	.659	(12.0)	182	.275	2.94	650	497	153
Tokyo Giants	2010	3rd	144	79	64	1	.552	1.0	226	.266	3.89	711	640	71
Tokyo Giants	2011	3rd	144	71	62	11	.534	3.5	108	.243	2.61	471	417	54
Tokyo Giants	2012	1st	144	86	43	15	.667	(10.5)	94	.256	2.16	534	354	180
Tokyo Giants	2013	1st	144	84	53	7	.613	(12.5)	145	.262	3.21	597	508	89
Tokyo Giants	2014	1st[Note 2]	144	82	61	1	.573	(7.0)	144	.257	3.58	596	552	44
Tokyo Giants	2015	2nd	143	75	67	1	.528	1.5	98	.243	2.78	489	443	46
Tokyo Giants	2019	1st	143	77	64	2	.5463	(5.5)	183	.257	3.71	663	573	90
Tokyo Giants	2020	1st	120	67	45	8	.598	(7.5)	135	.255	3.34	532	421	111
Tokyo Giants	2021	3rd	143	61	62	20	.496	11.0	169	.242	3.63	552	541	11
Tokyo Giants	2022	4th	143	68	72	3	.486	12.0	163	.242	3.69	548	589	-41
Career total			2264	1220	355	89	.538	—	—	—	—	9569	8381	1182

(Source: Nippon Professional Baseball)

- Note 1: A regular season Central League champion, however, playoff (Climax Series) failed for second round in 2007.
- Note 2: A regular season Central League champion, however, Climax Series failed for second round in 2014.

== Personal life ==
Hara's nephew, Tomoyuki Sugano, is a professional pitcher for the Giants. As confirmed via the latter's retirement ceremony on July 7, 2026, he is a fan of professional wrestling, and especially Tiger Mask IV.

== See also ==
- List of top Nippon Professional Baseball home run hitters
- List of Nippon Professional Baseball players with 1,000 runs batted in
