= 1987 Nippon Professional Baseball season =

1987 NPB season
- League: Nippon Professional Baseball
- Sport: Baseball

Regular season
- Season MVP: CL: Kazuhiro Yamakura (YOM); PL: Osamu Higashio (SEI)

League postseason
- CL champions: Yomiuri Giants
- CL runners-up: Chunichi Dragons
- PL champions: Seibu Lions
- PL runners-up: Hankyu Braves

Japan Series
- Champions: Seibu Lions
- Runners-up: Yomiuri Giants
- Finals MVP: Kimiyasu Kudoh (SEI)

NPB seasons
- ← 1986 1988 →

The 1987 Nippon Professional Baseball season was the 38th season of operation for the league.

== Regular season standings ==
=== Central League ===
Central League	G	W	L	T	Pct.	GB
Yomiuri Giants	130	76	43	11	.639	--
Chunichi Dragons	130	68	51	11	.571	8.0
Hiroshima Toyo Carp	130	65	55	10	.542	11.5
Yakult Swallows	130	58	64	8	.475	19.5
Yokohama Taiyo Whales	130	56	68	6	.452	22.5
Hanshin Tigers	130	41	83	6	.331	37.5

=== Pacific League ===
Pacific League	G	W	L	T	Pct.	GB
Seibu Lions	130	71	45	14	.612	--
Hankyu Braves	130	64	56	10	.533	9.0
Nippon-Ham Fighters	130	63	60	7	.512	11.5
Nankai Hawks	130	57	63	10	.475	16.0
Lotte Orions	130	51	65	14	.440	20.0
Kintetsu Buffaloes	130	52	69	9	.430	21.5

== Japan Series ==
Seibu Lions won the series 4-2.

Game	Score	Date	Location	Attendance
1	Lions – 3, Giants – 7	October 25	Seibu Lions Stadium	32,365
2	Lions – 6, Giants – 0	October 26	Seibu Lions Stadium	32,434
3	Giants – 1, Lions – 2	October 28	Korakuen Stadium	40,608
4	Giants – 4, Lions – 0	October 29	Korakuen Stadium	40,829
5	Giants – 1, Lions – 3	October 30	Korakuen Stadium	41,383
6	Lions – 3, Giants – 1	November 1	Seibu Lions Stadium	32,323

== See also ==
- 1987 Major League Baseball season
