= Kazuhiro Yamakura =

Japanese baseball player and coach (born 1955)

- Catcher / Coach
- Born: September 2, 1955 (age 71); Ōbu, Aichi
- Batted: Right Threw: Right

NPB debut
- April 1, 1978, for the Yomiuri Giants

Last NPB appearance
- October 10, 1990, for the Yomiuri Giants

NPB statistics (through 1990 season)
- Batting average: .231
- Hits: 832
- RBIs: 426
- Stats at Baseball Reference

Teams
- As player: Yomiuri Giants (1978–1990); As coach: Yomiuri Giants (1993–1998); Fukuoka SoftBank Hawks (2011)

Career highlights and awards
- 2× Japan Series champion (1981, 1989); Central League MVP (1987); 8× NPB All-Star (1981 - 1987, 1990); 3× Best Nine Award (1981, 1983, 1987); 3× Central League Golden Glove Award (1981, 1983, 1987); NPB All-Star Game MVP (1981 Game 3)
- Last updated on: 11 January 2016

Kazuhiro Yamakura (山倉 和博, born September 2, 1955) is a Japanese former professional baseball catcher. He spent his entire 13-year playing career with the Yomiuri Giants of Nippon Professional Baseball.

He was the 1987 Central League MVP.
