= 1982 Japan Series =

Team (Wins)	Managers	Season
Seibu Lions (4)	Tatsuro Hirooka	68–58–4 (.577), ½ GA
Chunichi Dragons (2)	Sadao Kondo	64–47–19 (.540)
- Dates: October 23–30
- MVP: Osamu Higashio (Seibu)
- FSA: Seiji Kamikawa (Chunichi)

The 1982 Japan Series was the championship series of Nippon Professional Baseball for the 1982 season. The 33rd edition of the Series, it was a best-of-seven playoff that matched the Central League champion Chunichi Dragons against the Pacific League champion Seibu Lions. The Lions defeated the Dragons in six games to win their fourth championship in team history, and first championship since 1958. This was also the Lions' first title since moving from Fukuoka to Saitama in 1979. This was the last time the Pacific League had held a playoff system to determine their champion that saw the first place team (with no split-season) reaching the Japan Series automatically until 2004.

Lions manager Tatsuro Hirooka, who previously led the Yakult Swallows to the 1978 championship, became the third (and so far last) manager to win championships with multiple teams.

== Summary ==
Game	Score	Date	Location	Attendance
1	Dragons – 3, Lions – 7	October 23	Nagoya Stadium	29,196
2	Dragons – 1, Lions – 7	October 24	Nagoya Stadium	29,194
3	Lions – 3, Dragons – 4	October 26	Seibu Lions Stadium	25,342
4	Lions – 3, Dragons – 5	October 27	Seibu Lions Stadium	29,323
5	Lions – 3, Dragons – 1	October 28	Seibu Lions Stadium	26,230
6	Dragons – 4, Lions – 9	October 30	Nagoya Stadium	28,725

== See also ==
- 1982 World Series
