= 1981 Nippon Professional Baseball season =

1981 NPB season
- League: Nippon Professional Baseball
- Sport: Baseball

Regular season
- Season MVP: CL: Suguru Egawa (YOM); PL: Yutaka Enatsu (NIP)

League postseason
- CL champions: Yomiuri Giants
- CL runners-up: Hiroshima Toyo Carp
- PL champions: Nippon-Ham Fighters
- PL runners-up: Lotte Orions

Japan Series
- Champions: Yomiuri Giants
- Runners-up: Nippon-Ham Fighters
- Finals MVP: Takashi Nishimoto (YOM)

NPB seasons
- ← 1980 1982 →

The 1981 Nippon Professional Baseball season was the 32nd season of operation for the league.

== Regular season standings ==
=== Central League ===
Central League	G	W	L	T	Pct.	GB
Yomiuri Giants	130	73	48	9	.603	–
Hiroshima Toyo Carp	130	67	54	9	.554	6.0
Hanshin Tigers	130	67	58	5	.536	8.0
Yakult Swallows	130	56	58	16	.491	13.5
Chunichi Dragons	130	58	65	7	.472	16.0
Yokohama Taiyo Whales	130	42	80	8	.344	31.5

=== Pacific League ===
Pacific League	G	W	L	T	Pct.	1st half ranking	2nd half ranking
Nippon-Ham Fighters	130	68	54	8	.557	4	1
Hankyu Braves	130	68	58	4	.540	3	2
Lotte Orions	130	63	57	10	.525	1	3
Seibu Lions	130	61	61	8	.500	2	5
Nankai Hawks	130	53	65	12	.449	5	6
Kintetsu Buffaloes	130	54	72	4	.429	6	4

== Pacific League playoff ==
The Pacific League teams with the best first and second-half records met in a best-of-five playoff series to determine the league representative in the Japan Series.

Nippon-Ham Fighters won the series 3–1–1.

Game	Score	Date	Location
1	Orions – 1, Fighters – 4	October 7	Kawasaki Stadium
2	Orions – 5, Fighters – 5	October 10	Kawasaki Stadium
3	Fighters – 4, Orions – 1	October 11	Korakuen Stadium
4	Fighters – 6, Orions – 11	October 12	Korakuen Stadium
5	Fighters – 8, Orions – 4	October 13	Korakuen Stadium

== Japan Series ==
Yomiuri Giants won the series 4–2.

Game	Score	Date	Location	Attendance
1	Fighters – 6, Giants – 5	October 17	Korakuen Stadium	36,056
2	Fighters – 1, Giants – 2	October 18	Korakuen Stadium	42,376
3	Giants – 2, Fighters – 3	October 20	Korakuen Stadium	36,180
4	Giants – 8, Fighters – 2	October 21	Korakuen Stadium	38,627
5	Giants – 9, Fighters – 0	October 23	Korakuen Stadium	31,419
6	Fighters – 3, Giants – 6	October 25	Korakuen Stadium	43,604

== See also ==
- 1981 Major League Baseball season
