= Masayuki Tanemo =

Japanese baseball player (born 1938)

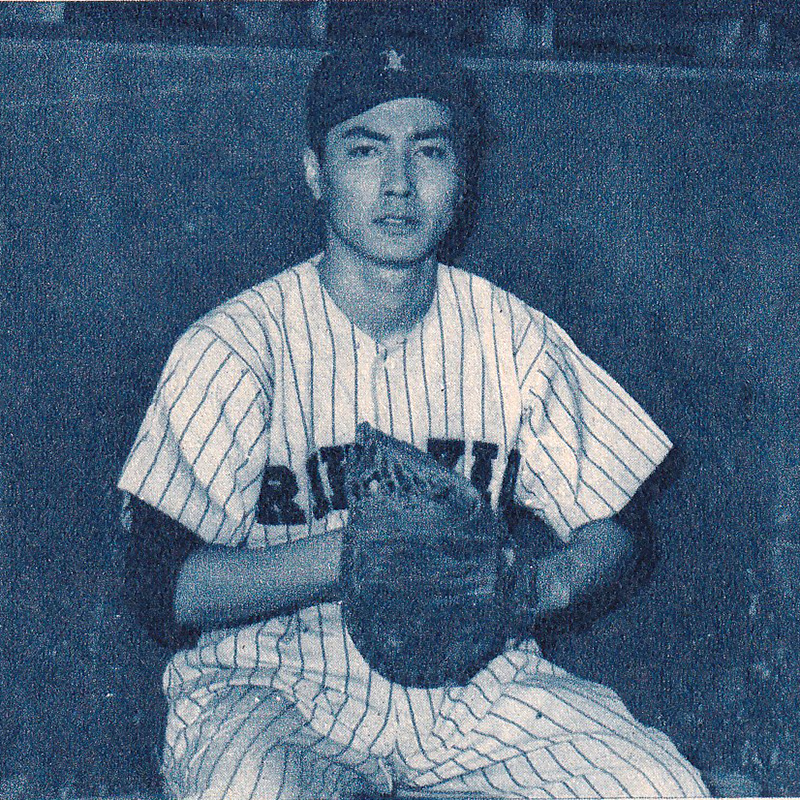
- Masayuki Tanemo
- Catcher
- Born: February 13, 1938 (age 88); Shizuoka Prefecture, Japan
- Bats: Right Throws: Right

Teams
- As player: Toei Flyers (1961–1971); Hankyu Braves (1972–1974); As coach: Hankyu Braves (1975–1977); Nippon-Ham Fighters (1981–1988, 1993-1995)

Masayuki Tanemo (種茂 雅之, Tanemo Masayuki; born February 13, 1938) is a former Japanese Nippon Professional Baseball catcher. He played for the Toei Flyers from 1961 to 1971 and the Hankyu Braves from 1972 to 1974. He and teammate Masayuki Dobashi split the Japan Series Most Valuable Player Award in 1962.
