= 1982 Nippon Professional Baseball season =

1982 NPB season
- League: Nippon Professional Baseball
- Sport: Baseball

Regular season
- Season MVP: CL: Takayoshi Nakao (CHU); PL: Hiromitsu Ochiai (LOT)

League postseason
- CL champions: Chunichi Dragons
- CL runners-up: Yomiuri Giants
- PL champions: Seibu Lions
- PL runners-up: Nippon-Ham Fighters

Japan Series
- Champions: Seibu Lions
- Runners-up: Chunichi Dragons
- Finals MVP: Osamu Higashio (SEI)

NPB seasons
- ← 1981 1983 →

The 1982 Nippon Professional Baseball season was the 33rd season of operation for the league. This was the last season of the first-half/second-half playoff system for the Pacific League, which changed their system for 1983 that would see the first-place team play the second-place team in a playoff only if they finished within five games of each other (in contrast, the ten-season tenure of matching the champion of the halves saw two occasions where one team won both halves). As it never ended up being used until its dissolution in 1985, the next season in which either league had a playoff system until 2004. The Chunichi Dragons narrowly won the Central pennant by defeating the fifth-place Taiyo Whales, who they played three times to end the season and needed to beat twice.

== Regular season standings ==
=== Central League ===
Central League	G	W	L	T	Pct.	GB
Chunichi Dragons	130	64	47	19	.577	–
Yomiuri Giants	130	66	50	14	.569	0.5
Hanshin Tigers	130	65	57	8	.533	4.5
Hiroshima Toyo Carp	130	59	58	13	.504	8.0
Yokohama Taiyo Whales	130	53	65	12	.449	14.5
Yakult Swallows	130	45	75	10	.375	23.5

=== Pacific League ===
Pacific League	G	W	L	T	Pct.	1st half ranking	2nd half ranking
Seibu Lions	130	68	58	4	.540	1	3
Nippon-Ham Fighters	130	67	52	11	.563	4	1
Kintetsu Buffaloes	130	63	57	10	.525	3	2
Hankyu Braves	130	62	60	8	.508	2	5
Lotte Orions	130	54	69	7	.439	6	4
Nankai Hawks	130	53	71	6	.427	5	6

== Pacific League playoff ==
The Pacific League teams with the best first and second-half records met in a best-of-five playoff series to determine the league representative in the Japan Series. Terry Whitfield hit two home runs in the deciding Game 4 to send the Lions to the Japan Series.

Seibu Lions won the series 3–1.

Seibu Lions (3) vs. Nippon-Ham Fighters (1)

Game	Date	Score	Location	Time	Attendance
1	October 9	Nippon-Ham Fighters – 0, Seibu Lions – 6	Seibu Lions Stadium	-	-
2	October 10	Nippon-Ham Fighters – 2, Seibu Lions – 3	Seibu Lions Stadium	-	-
3	October 12	Seibu Lions – 1, Nippon-Ham Fighters – 2	Korakuen Stadium	-	-
4	October 14	Seibu Lions – 7, Nippon-Ham Fighters – 5	Korakuen Stadium	-	24,000

== Japan Series ==
Seibu Lions won the series 4–2.

Game	Score	Date	Location	Attendance
1	Dragons – 3, Lions – 7	October 23	Nagoya Stadium	29,196
2	Dragons – 1, Lions – 7	October 24	Nagoya Stadium	29,194
3	Lions – 3, Dragons – 4	October 26	Seibu Lions Stadium	25,342
4	Lions – 3, Dragons – 5	October 27	Seibu Lions Stadium	29,323
5	Lions – 3, Dragons – 1	October 28	Seibu Lions Stadium	26,230
6	Dragons – 4, Lions – 9	October 30	Nagoya Stadium	28,725

== See also ==
- 1982 Major League Baseball season
