= 1981 Japan Series =

Team (Wins)	Managers	Season
Yomiuri Giants (4)	Motoshi Fujita	73–48–9 (.603), 6 GA
Nippon-Ham Fighters (2)	Keiji Osawa	68–54–8 (.557)
- Dates: October 17–25
- Venue: Korakuen Stadium
- MVP: Takashi Nishimoto (Yomiuri)
- FSA: Hiroaki Inoue (Nippon-Ham)

The 1981 Japan Series was the championship series of Nippon Professional Baseball (NPB) for the 1981 season. The 32nd edition of the Series, it was a best-of-seven playoff that matched the Central League champion Yomiuri Giants against the Pacific League champion Nippon-Ham Fighters. All games in the series were played at Korakuen Stadium, which served as the home ballpark for both teams during the regular season. This was the first time in Japan Series history that all games were played at the same stadium. The Giants defeated the Fighters in six games for their 16th Japan Series title in team history.

== Summary ==
Game	Score	Date	Location	Attendance
1	Fighters – 6, Giants – 5	October 17	Korakuen Stadium	36,056
2	Fighters – 1, Giants – 2	October 18	Korakuen Stadium	42,376
3	Giants – 2, Fighters – 3	October 20	Korakuen Stadium	36,180
4	Giants – 8, Fighters – 2	October 21	Korakuen Stadium	38,627
5	Giants – 9, Fighters – 0	October 23	Korakuen Stadium	31,419
6	Fighters – 3, Giants – 6	October 25	Korakuen Stadium	43,604

== See also ==
- 1981 World Series
