= Tetsuharu Kawakami =

Japanese baseball player and manager (1920–2013)

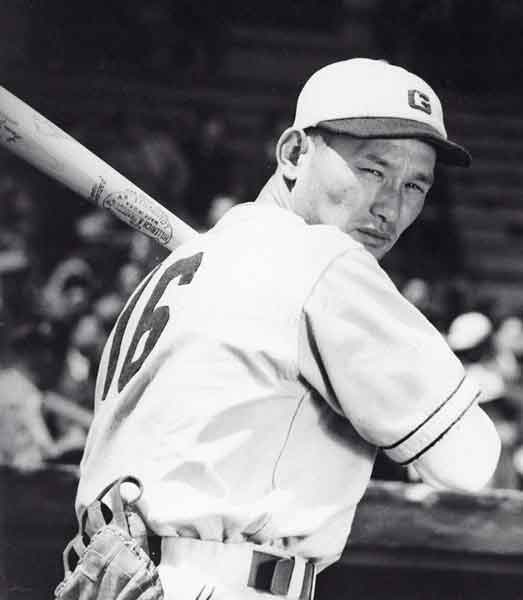
- Tetsuharu Kawakami
- First basemen
- Born: March 23, 1920; Hitoyoshi, Kumamoto, Japan
- Died: October 28, 2013 (aged 93); Inagi, Tokyo, Japan
- Batted: Left Threw: Left

Japanese Baseball League (JBL) debut
- Spring, 1938, for the Tokyo Kyojin

Last appearance
- 1958, for the Yomiuri Giants

JBL/Nippon Professional Baseball statistics
- Batting average: .313
- Hits: 2,351
- Home runs: 181
- Runs batted in: 1,319
- Runs: 1,028
- Stolen bases: 220
- Managerial record: 1,066–739–61
- Winning %: .591

Teams
- As player: Tokyo Kyojin/Yomiuri Giants (1938–1958); As manager: Yomiuri Giants (1961–1974)

Career highlights and awards
- As player: 4× Japan Series champion (1951, 1952, 1953, 1955); Japanese Baseball League MVP (1941); 2× Central League MVP (1951, 1955); 10× Best Nine Award (1940, 1947–1949, 1951, 1953, 1955–1958); 5× Central League batting champion; 2× Central League home run crown; 3× Central League RBI champion; Hit for the cycle on July 25, 1954; Yomiuri Giants #16 retired; As manager: 11× Japan Series champion (1961, 1963, 1965, 1966, 1967, 1968, 1969, 1970, 1971, 1972, 1973)

Member of the Japanese

Baseball Hall of Fame
- Induction: 1965

Tetsuharu Kawakami (川上 哲治, Kawakami Tetsuharu; March 23, 1920 – October 28, 2013) was a Japanese baseball player and manager, known for his red bat, and his nickname dageki no kamisama (打撃の神様, "the God of Batting/Hitting").

He was a professional player for 18 years, winning the batting title five times, two home run crowns, three RBI titles, and had six titles for the most hits in a season. He was the MVP of the 1953 Japan Series. He was the first player in Japanese pro baseball to achieve 2,000 hits and was named the league's MVP three times. As manager of the Yomiuri Giants from 1961 to 1974, he led the Giants to eleven championships, with nine of them being in consecutive years; his teams never lost a Japan Series with him as a manager. He has the most Japan Series championships as a manager.

Kawakami was inducted into the Japanese Baseball Hall of Fame in 1965.

== Biography ==
=== Player ===
Born in Hitoyoshi, Kumamoto, he played for Kumamoto Tech (Kumamoto) in the 1937 Summer Kōshien. Kumamoto advanced to the championship game, but lost. After the game, Kawakami grabbed a handful of dirt from the playing field of Kōshien Stadium and put it in his uniform pocket as a memento. This became known as the original scooping of "the dirt of Kōshien" (甲子園の土 Kōshien no tsuchi?). Since then, as a memento of their fleeting time on the hallowed grounds of Kōshien, players from the losing teams take home a pouch of the precious soil.

Kawakami played for Tokyo Kyojin/Yomiuri Giants between 1938 and 1958 (though he missed the years 1943–1945 when he served in the Japanese military). Kawakami signed with the Giants as a pitcher/first baseman, and actually pitched in 39 games between 1938 and 1941, compiling 11 wins against 9 losses, with an excellent 2.61 ERA. He converted full-time to first base in 1942.

In 1951, he struck out only six times, which is the Japanese single-season tie record. In 1954, Kawakami hit the first cycle in Yomiuri Giants' franchise history. In the years prior to the formation of NPB, the Japanese Baseball League held a Best Nine Award in 1940, 1947, 1948, and 1949, with Kawakami being named to the Best Nine each time at the position of first base. In NPB, Kawakami was named to the Central League Best Nine six times for a total of ten times as a player.

=== Manager ===
As manager of the Giants from 1961 to 1974, he was known for his ruthless, tough-love style, one that took inspiration from the Los Angeles Dodgers (specifically the guide "The Dodgers Way to Play Baseball" by Al Campanis) in having a consistent team culture in tactics and positioning that most notably went for closers to finish games rather than just retaining the starter for the whole game. He would lead the Yomiuri Giants to nine consecutive championships. He went 1,066–739–61 as manager while winning 44 of 62 playoff games, both of which are still the best marks in Giants history. In eleven trips to the Japan Series as manager, the Giants played in a Game 7 just once (1963).

Kawakami was a strong advocate for keeping the league exclusively Asian only while having a strategy of "controlled baseball" with his players that had strenuous practices to go along with limiting the press in access; Isao Shibata notably stated he never stole a base unless he was told to by Kawakami. He stated the following mantra to his players constantly: “Let them say what they want to say, and we will answer with results by season’s end.”

== Filmography ==
Tetsuharu Kawakami appeared in three films:

- 人生選手 (1949)
- 川上哲治物語 背番号16 Kawakami Tetsuharu monogatari sebangō 16 (1957) — a bio-pic where he played himself
- BIG−1物語 王貞治 (1977)

In addition, Kawakami is referred to by name in the baseball game scene from film director Akira Kurosawa's Stray Dog (1949); a.k.a. Nora Inu.

== See also ==
- List of Nippon Professional Baseball career hits leaders
- List of Nippon Professional Baseball players with 1,000 runs batted in
