= Motoshi Fujita =

Japanese baseball player and manager

Motoshi Fujita 藤田 元司
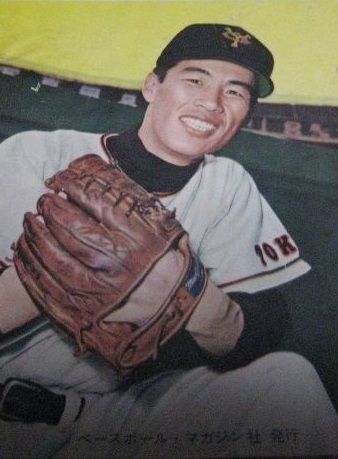
- Fujita in 1959
- Pitcher, Manager
- Born: August 7, 1931; Niihama, Ehime
- Died: February 9, 2006 (aged 74)
- Batted: Right Threw: Right

NPB debut
- 1957, for the Yomiuri Giants

Last appearance
- 1964, for the Yomiuri Giants

NPB statistics
- Win–loss: 119–88
- ERA: 2.20
- Strikeouts: 924
- Stats at Baseball Reference

Teams
- As player: Yomiuri Giants (1957–1964); As manager: Yomiuri Giants (1981–1983, 1989–1992); As coach: Yomiuri Giants (1963–1974); Taiyo Whales (1975–1976)

Career highlights and awards
- As player: 1957 Central League Rookie of the Year; 2× Central League MVP (1958–1959); 2× Japan Series champion (1961, 1963); As manager: 2× Matsutaro Shoriki Award (1981, 1989); 2× Japan Series champion (1981, 1989)

Member of the Japanese

Baseball Hall of Fame
- Induction: 1996
Medals
Representing Japan
Global World Series
Gold medal – first place	1956 Milwaukee	Team

Motoshi Fujita (藤田 元司, Fujita Motoshi; (August 7, 1931 – February 9, 2006) was a Japanese professional baseball pitcher and manager. He spent his entire career with the Yomiuri Giants of Nippon Professional Baseball, winning two Japan Series titles as a player and two more as manager.
