= Masaaki Mori =

Japanese footballer

Masaaki Mori 森 正明
Personal information
- Full name: Masaaki Mori
- Date of birth: July 12, 1961 (age 65)
- Place of birth: Nagasaki, Japan
- Height: 1.76 m (5 ft 9 in)
- Position: Midfielder

Youth career
- 1977–1979: Nagasaki Nanzan High School
- 1980–1983: Fukuoka University

Senior career*
Years	Team	Apps	(Gls)
1984–1992	Fujita Industries	131	(19)
Total		131	(19)

International career
1988–1989	Japan	8	(0)
Medal record
Fujita Industries
Runner-up	Emperor's Cup	1985
Runner-up	Emperor's Cup	1988
- * Club domestic league appearances and goals

Masaaki Mori (森 正明, Mori Masaaki; born July 12, 1961) is a former Japanese football player. He played for Japan national team.

== Club career ==
Mori was born in Nagasaki Prefecture on July 12, 1961. After graduating from Fukuoka University, he joined Japan Soccer League Division 1 club Fujita Industries in 1984. The club was relegated to Division 2 in 1990. In 1992, the club won the champions in Division 2. He retired in 1992. He played 131 games and scored 19 goals in the league.

== National team career ==
On June 2, 1988, Mori debuted for Japan national team against China. In 1989, he played at the 1990 World Cup qualification. He played 8 games for Japan until 1989.

== Political career ==
In May 2016, Mori became speaker of the Kanagawa Prefectural Assembly.

== Club statistics ==
Club performance			League		Cup		League Cup		Total	
Season	Club	League	Apps	Goals	Apps	Goals	Apps	Goals	Apps	Goals
Japan			League		Emperor's Cup		JSL Cup		Total	
1984	Fujita Industries	JSL Division 1								
1985/86	Fujita Industries	JSL Division 1								
1986/87	Fujita Industries	JSL Division 1								
1987/88	Fujita Industries	JSL Division 1								
1988/89	Fujita Industries	JSL Division 1								
1989/90	Fujita Industries	JSL Division 1	22	3			4	1	26	4
1990/91	Fujita Industries	JSL Division 2	24	4			0	0	24	4
1991/92	Fujita Industries	JSL Division 2	26	7			2	0	26	7
Total			72	14	0	0	6	1	78	15

== National team statistics ==
Japan national team
Year	Apps	Goals
1988	1	0
1989	7	0
Total	8	0
