= Hiroaki Inoue =

Japanese baseball player (1944–2025)

Hiroaki Inoue 井上弘昭
- Outfielder, third baseman, first baseman
- Born: May 5, 1944; Osaka, Japan
- Died: December 8, 2025 (aged 81); Tajimi, Japan
- Batted: Right Threw: Right

Nippon Professional Baseball debut
- 1967, for the Hiroshima Toyo Carp
- Stats at Baseball Reference

Teams
- As player: Chunichi Dragons (1973–1981); Hokkaido Nippon-Ham Fighters (1981–1984); As coach: Seibu Lions (1985)

Hiroaki Inoue (Japanese:井上弘昭; May 5, 1944 – December 8, 2025) was a Japanese baseball player.

In 1966, Inoue was selected as a representative of Japan at the Amateur Baseball World Championship, contributing to Japan's championship and being selected as the best nine (outfielder) for working adults.

During the 1967 draft, he was a first round pick for the Hiroshima Toyo Carp. In 1973, in an exchange trade with Kazuto Kawabata, he transferred to the Chunichi Dragons. In 1981, in an exchange trade with Masaru Tomita and Hideaki Oshima, he transferred to the Hokkaido Nippon-Ham Fighters.

After the end of the 1984 season, he retired from playing, and in 1985, he was appointed the defensive base running coach of the Seibu Lions. Due to the retirement of the right pinch hitter, he returned to playing (concurrently serving as a coach). However, he only played in 10 games, and after the end of the season, he left Seibu and officially retired, becoming the first professional baseball commentator on TV Aichi.

Inoue was born May 5, 1944, in Osaka. He died on December 8, 2025, at the age of 81.
