= Japan Series Most Valuable Player Award =

Award in Japan

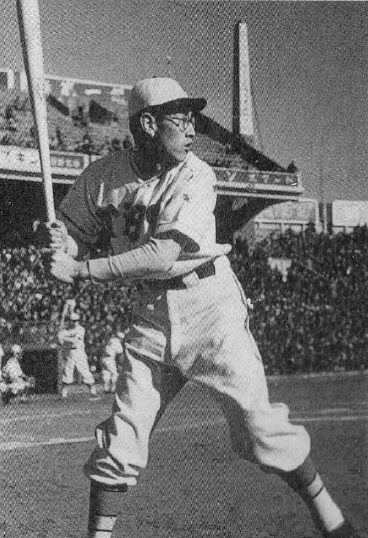
- Kaoru Betto was the inaugural Japan Series MVP Award winner, for the 1950 Mainichi Orions
- Awarded for: Most valuable player of the Japan Series
- Country: Japan
- Presented by: Nippon Professional Baseball
- First award: 1950
- Currently held by: Hotaka Yamakawa (Fukuoka SoftBank Hawks)

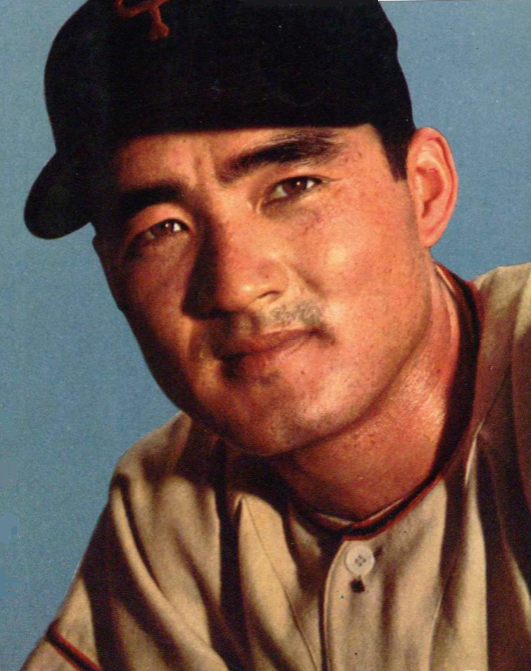
Shigeo Nagashima has the most Japan Series MVP awards, winning it four times (1963, 1965, 1969, 1970); he is one of just three players to have won consecutive Series MVP awards.

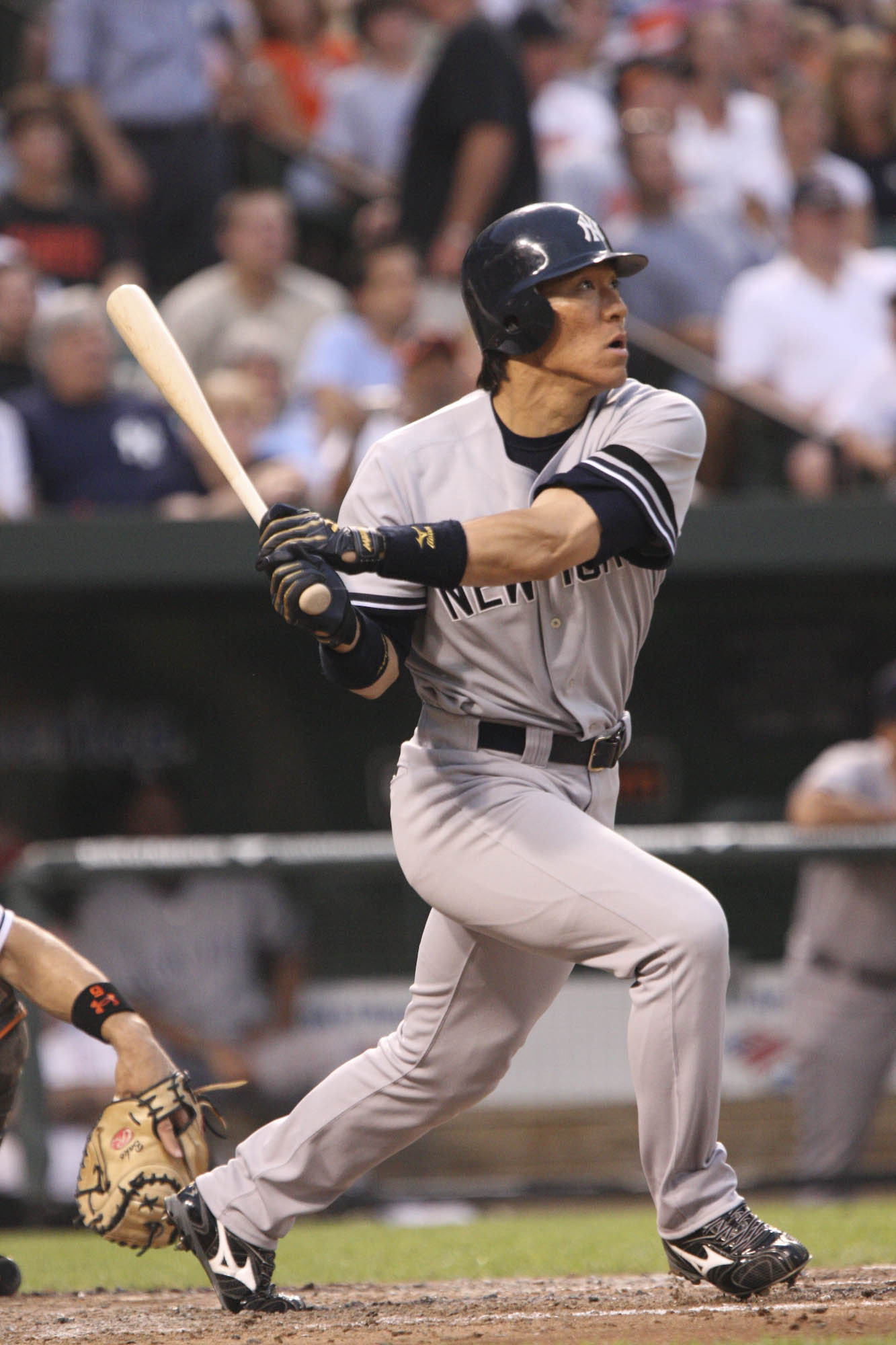
Hideki Matsui won the 2000 Japan Series MVP with the Yomiuri Giants. He went on to win the 2009 World Series MVP with MLB's New York Yankees.

The Japan Series Most Valuable Player (MVP) Award (日本シリーズ最高殊勲選手, Nippon Shirīzu Saikō Shukun Senshu) is given to the player deemed to have the most impact on his team's performance in the Japan Series, which is the final round of the Nippon Professional Baseball (NPB) postseason. The award was first presented in 1950.

The series follows a best-of-seven playoff format and occurs after the two-stage Climax Series. It is played by the winners of the Final Stage round of the Central League and the Pacific League.

Kaoru Betto won the inaugural award in 1950 with the Mainichi Orions. Depending upon definitions, the first non-Japanese to win the award was either Andy Miyamoto in 1961 or Joe Stanka in 1964. Fifteen Japan Series MVPs were inducted into the Japanese Baseball Hall of Fame; Osamu Higashio (1982) was the first pitcher to appear solely as a reliever to win the Japan Series MVP, with only Dennis Sarfate (2017) joining him since. Of the first fifteen winners of the award since 2000, only three are still active in professional baseball as a player. Hideki Matsui and Norihiro Nakamura are they only two Japan Series MVPs to play in Major League Baseball (MLB). While Nakamura's MLB career lasted less than one season, Matsui's lasted ten seasons. He became the first (and so far only) player to be named both a Japan Series and a World Series MVP after winning the latter award in 2009. The reigning Japan Series MVP is Tomoya Masaki of the Fukuoka SoftBank Hawks.

Numerous players of the 77 Japan Series MVPs have also won the NPB MVP or the Eiji Sawamura Award in the same season. Five players won the Eiji Sawamura Award and the Japan Series MVP in the same season: Shigeru Sugishita (1954), Takehiko Bessho (1955), Tsuneo Horiuchi (1972), Takashi Nishimoto (1981), Takehiro Ishii (1992); Sugishita, Horiuchi, and Ishii are the only players to have won all three awards in the same season. Twelve players have won the Japan Series MVP in the same season in which they won the NPB MVP: Betto (1950), Bessho (1952), Kazuhisa Inao (1958), Tadashi Sugiura (1959), Shigeo Nagashima (1963), Stanka (1964), Hisashi Yamada (1977), Randy Bass (1985), Tom O'Malley (1995), Furuta (1997), Matsui (2000), Dennis Sarfate (2017).

Six players have won the award multiple times. Nagashima has won the most Japan Series MVP awards with four wins (1963, 1965, 1969–1970). The remaining five players all won the award twice: Bessho (1952, 1955), Horiuchi (1972–1973), Kimiyasu Kudoh (1986–1987), Koji Akiyama (1991–1999), Atsuya Furuta (1997, 2001), and Toshiaki Imae (2005, 2010); Akiyama is the only player to have won the award with different teams. There has been one occasion on which multiple winners were awarded in the same Japan Series: Masayuki Dobashi and Masayuki Tanemo in 1962.

Pitchers have been named Series MVP 21 times, 13 of which appeared in both starting and relief roles in the Series.

== Winners ==
Key
Year	Links to the article about that corresponding Japan Series
§	Member of the Japanese Baseball Hall of Fame and Museum
†	Active player
^	Indicates multiple award winners in the same Japan Series
(#)	Indicates number of times winning Japan Series MVP at that point (if he won multiple times)

Year	Player	Team	Position	Selected statistics	Note
1950	Kaoru Betto^{§}	Mainichi Orions	Outfielder	.500 batting average; 12 hits; 3 runs batted in	
1951	Yuko Minamimura	Yomiuri Giants	Outfielder	.563 batting average; 9 hits; 4 runs batted in	
1952	Takehiko Bessho^{§}	Yomiuri Giants	Pitcher	3–0 record in 3 appearances (2 complete game starts); 4 earned runs allowed in 22 innings pitched; 10 strikeouts	
1953	Tetsuharu Kawakami^{§}	Yomiuri Giants	First baseman	.556 batting average; 15 hits; 5 runs batted in	
1954	Shigeru Sugishita^{§}	Chunichi Dragons	Pitcher	3–1 record in 5 appearances (4 complete game starts); 6 earned runs allowed in 38 2/3 innings pitched; 28 strikeouts	
1955	Takehiko Bessho^{§} (2)	Yomiuri Giants	Pitcher	3–1 record in 5 appearances (3 starts); 2 complete games; 4 earned runs allowed in 30 2/3 innings pitched; 9 strikeouts	
1956	Yasumitsu Toyoda^{§}	Nishitetsu Lions	Shortstop	.458 batting average; 11 hits; 4 runs batted in	
1957	Hiroshi Ohshita^{§}	Nishitetsu Lions	Outfielder	.389 batting average; 7 hits; 3 runs batted in	
1958	Kazuhisa Inao^{§}	Nishitetsu Lions	Pitcher	4–2 record in 6 appearances (5 starts); 4 complete games; 8 earned runs allowed in 47 innings pitched; 32 strikeouts	
1959	Tadashi Sugiura^{§}	Nankai Hawks	Pitcher	4–0 record in 4 appearances (3 starts); 2 complete games; 5 earned runs allowed in 32 innings pitched; 20 strikeouts	
1960	Akihito Kondo	Taiyō Whales	Second baseman	.200 batting average; 3 hits; 2 runs batted in	
1961	Andy Miyamoto	Yomiuri Giants	Outfielder	.409 batting average; 9 hits; 7 runs batted in	
1962^{^}	Masayuki Dobashi	Toei Flyers	Pitcher	2–1 record in 6 appearances (2 starts); 4 earned runs allowed in 20 2/3 innings pitched; 12 strikeouts	
1962^{^}	Masayuki Tanemo	Toei Flyers	Catcher	.357 batting average; 5 hits; 5 runs batted in	
1963	Shigeo Nagashima^{§}	Yomiuri Giants	Third baseman	.360 batting average; 3 home runs; 7 runs batted in	
1964	Joe Stanka	Nankai Hawks	Starting pitcher	3–1 record in 4 games started; 3 complete games; 4 earned runs allowed in 29 1/3 innings pitched; 21 strikeouts	
1965	Shigeo Nagashima^{§} (2)	Yomiuri Giants	Third baseman	.381 batting average; 8 hits; 6 runs batted in	
1966	Isao Shibata	Yomiuri Giants	Outfielder	.565 batting average; 13 hits; 7 runs batted in	
1967	Masaaki Mori^{§}	Yomiuri Giants	Catcher	.273 batting average; 6 hits; 4 runs batted in	
1968	Shigeru Takada	Yomiuri Giants	Outfielder	.385 batting average; 10 hits; 8 runs	
1969	Shigeo Nagashima^{§} (3)	Yomiuri Giants	Third baseman	.409 batting average; 4 home runs; 6 runs batted in	
1970	Shigeo Nagashima^{§} (4)	Yomiuri Giants	Third baseman	.421 batting average; 4 home runs; 6 runs batted in	
1971	Toshimitsu Suetsugu	Yomiuri Giants	Outfielder	.368 batting average; 7 hits; 7 runs	
1972	Tsuneo Horiuchi^{§}	Yomiuri Giants	Pitcher	2–1 record in 4 appearances (2 starts); 1 complete game; 7 earned runs allowed in 16 2/3 innings pitched; 11 strikeouts	
1973	Tsuneo Horiuchi^{§} (2)	Yomiuri Giants	Pitcher	2–0 record in 3 appearances (1 complete game start); 2 earned runs allowed in 16 1/3 innings pitched; 10 strikeouts	
1974	Sumio Hirota	Lotte Orions	Outfielder	.400 batting average; 10 hits; 7 runs batted in	
1975	Takashi Yamaguchi	Hankyu Braves	Pitcher	1–0 record and 2 saves in 6 appearances (1 complete game start); 6 earned runs allowed in 24 2/3 innings pitched; 21 strikeouts	
1976	Yutaka Fukumoto^{§}	Hankyu Braves	Outfielder	.407 batting average; 11 hits; 6 runs batted in	
1977	Hisashi Yamada^{§}	Hankyu Braves	Pitcher	2–0 record and 1 save in 3 appearances (1 complete game start); 3 earned runs allowed in 15 innings pitched; 10 strikeouts	
1978	Katsuo Osugi^{§}	Yakult Swallows	First baseman	.310 batting average; 4 Home runs; 10 runs batted in	
1979	Yoshihiko Takahashi	Hiroshima Toyo Carp	Shortstop	.444 batting average; 12 hits; 2 runs batted in	
1980	Jim Lyttle	Hiroshima Toyo Carp	Outfielder	.400 batting average; 3 Home runs; 6 runs batted in	
1981	Takashi Nishimoto	Yomiuri Giants	Starting pitcher	2–0 record in 2 complete game starts; 1 earned run allowed in 18 innings pitched; 14 strikeouts	
1982	Osamu Higashio^{§}	Seibu Lions	Relief pitcher	2–1 record and 1 save in 4 appearances; 0 earned runs allowed in 13 2/3 innings pitched; 6 strikeouts	
1983	Takuji Ota	Seibu Lions	Outfielder	.429 batting average; 12 hits; 3 runs batted in	
1984	Kiyoyuki Nagashima	Hiroshima Toyo Carp	Outfielder	.333 batting average; 3 Home runs; 10 runs batted in	
1985	Randy Bass^{§}	Hanshin Tigers	First baseman	.368 batting average; 3 Home runs; 9 runs batted in	
1986	Kimiyasu Kudoh^{§}	Seibu Lions	Pitcher	1–1 record and 2 saves in 4 appearances (1 start); 2 earned runs allowed in 15 innings pitched; 17 strikeouts	
1987	Kimiyasu Kudoh^{§} (2)	Seibu Lions	Pitcher	2–0 record and 1 save in 3 appearances (2 complete game starts); 1 earned runs allowed in 18 2/3 innings pitched; 13 strikeouts	
1988	Hiromichi Ishige	Seibu Lions	Shortstop	.389 batting average; 3 Home runs; 6 runs batted in	
1989	Norihiro Komada	Yomiuri Giants	First baseman	.522 batting average; 12 hits; 5 runs batted in	
1990	Orestes Destrade	Seibu Lions	First baseman	.375 batting average; 6 hits; 8 runs batted in	
1991	Koji Akiyama^{§}	Seibu Lions	Outfielder	.276 batting average; 4 Home runs; 8 runs batted in	
1992	Takehiro Ishii	Seibu Lions	Starting pitcher	2–0 record in 2 complete game starts; 1 earned runs allowed in 19 innings pitched; 18 strikeouts	
1993	Kenjiro Kawasaki	Yakult Swallows	Starting pitcher	2–0 record in 2 games started; 2 earned runs allowed in 15 innings pitched; 12 strikeouts	
1994	Hiromi Makihara	Yomiuri Giants	Starting pitcher	2–0 record in 2 complete game starts; 1 earned runs allowed in 18 innings pitched; 16 strikeouts	
1995	Tom O'Malley	Yakult Swallows	First baseman	.529 batting average; 9 hits; 4 runs batted in	
1996	Troy Neel	Orix BlueWave	Infielder	.176 batting average; 3 hits; 6 runs batted in	
1997	Atsuya Furuta^{§}	Yakult Swallows	Catcher	.316 batting average; 6 hits; 3 runs batted in	
1998	Takanori Suzuki	Yokohama BayStars	Outfielder	.480 batting average; 12 hits; 8 runs batted in	
1999	Koji Akiyama^{§} (2)	Fukuoka Daiei Hawks	Outfielder	.300 batting average; 6 hits; 2 Home runs	
2000	Hideki Matsui^{§}	Yomiuri Giants	Outfielder	.381 batting average; 3 Home runs; 8 runs batted in	
2001	Atsuya Furuta^{§} (2)	Yakult Swallows	Catcher	.500 batting average; 7 hits; 3 runs batted in	
2002	Tomohiro Nioka	Yomiuri Giants	Shortstop	.474 batting average; 9 hits; 5 runs batted in	
2003	Toshiya Sugiuchi	Fukuoka Daiei Hawks	Starting pitcher	2–0 record in 2 games started; 1 earned runs allowed in 15 innings pitched; 9 strikeouts	
2004	Takashi Ishii	Seibu Lions	Starting pitcher	2–0 record in 2 games started; 0 earned runs allowed in 13 innings pitched; 8 strikeouts	
2005	Toshiaki Imae	Chiba Lotte Marines	Third baseman	.667 batting average; 10 hits; 4 runs batted in	
2006	Atsunori Inaba	Hokkaido Nippon-Ham Fighters	Outfielder	.353 batting average; 6 hits; 7 runs batted in	
2007	Norihiro Nakamura	Chunichi Dragons	Third baseman	.444 batting average; 8 hits; 4 runs batted in	
2008	Takayuki Kishi^{†}	Saitama Seibu Lions	Pitcher	2–0 record in 2 appearances (1 complete game start); 0 earned runs allowed in 14 2/3 innings pitched; 16 strikeouts	
2009	Shinnosuke Abe	Yomiuri Giants	Catcher	.304 batting average; 7 hits; 5 runs batted in	
2010	Toshiaki Imae (2)	Chiba Lotte Marines	Third baseman	.444 batting average; 12 hits; 6 runs batted in	
2011	Hiroki Kokubo	Fukuoka SoftBank Hawks	First baseman		
2012	Tetsuya Utsumi	Yomiuri Giants	Starting pitcher		
2013	Manabu Mima^{†}	Tohoku Rakuten Golden Eagles	Starting pitcher		
2014	Seiichi Uchikawa	Fukuoka SoftBank Hawks	Outfielder		
2015	Dae-ho Lee	Fukuoka SoftBank Hawks	First baseman		
2016	Brandon Laird	Hokkaido Nippon-Ham Fighters	Third baseman		
2017	Dennis Sarfate	Fukuoka SoftBank Hawks	Pitcher	1–0 record and 2 saves in 3 appearances; 0 earned runs allowed in 5 innings pitched; 6 strikeouts	
2018	Takuya Kai^{†}	Fukuoka SoftBank Hawks	Catcher	6 runners caught stealing	
2019	Yurisbel Gracial	Fukuoka SoftBank Hawks	Outfielder	.375 batting average; Three home runs; 6 runs batted in	
2020	Ryoya Kurihara^{†}	Fukuoka SoftBank Hawks	Catcher	.500 batting average; 7 hits; 4 runs batted in	
2021	Yuhei Nakamura^{†}	Tokyo Yakult Swallows	Catcher		
2022	Yutaro Sugimoto^{†}	Orix Buffaloes	Outfielder		
2023	Kōji Chikamoto^{†}	Hanshin Tigers	Outfielder		
2024	Masayuki Kuwahara^{†}	Yokohama DeNA BayStars	Outfielder		
2025	Hotaka Yamakawa^{†}	Fukuoka SoftBank Hawks	First baseman	.384 batting average; 5 hits; 7 runs batted in; 3 home runs	
2026	Tomoya Masaki^{†}	Fukuoka SoftBank Hawks	First baseman/Outfielder	.348 batting average; 7 hits; 2 runs batted in; 2 home runs	

== See also ==
- Korean Series Most Valuable Player Award
- World Series Most Valuable Player Award
