= Toshimitsu Suetsugu =

Japanese baseball player (born 1942)

- Outfielder
- Born: March 2, 1942 (age 84); Hitoyoshi, Kumamoto, Japan
- Batted: Right Threw: Right

debut
- 1965, for the Yomiuri Giants

Last appearance
- 1977, for the Yomiuri Giants

Career statistics
- Batting average: .269
- Home runs: 107
- Runs batted in: 456

Teams
- As player: Yomiuri Giants (1965–1977); As coach: Yomiuri Giants (1978–1994)

Career highlights and awards
- 9× Japan Series Champion 1965, 1966, 1967, 1968, 1969, 1970, 1971, 1972, 1973; 5× All-Star (1972–1976); Japan Series MVP (1971)

Toshimitsu Suetsugu (末次 利光, Suetsugu Toshimitsu; born March 2, 1942) is a Japanese former professional baseball outfielder in Nippon Professional Baseball. He played for the Yomiuri Giants from 1965 to 1977.
