= Osamu Higashio =

Japanese baseball player (born 1950)

- Pitcher
- Born: May 18, 1950 (age 75); Wakayama Prefecture, Japan
- Batted: Right Threw: Right

NPB debut
- 1969, for the Nishitetsu Lions

Last appearance
- 1988, for the Seibu Lions

Career statistics
- Win–loss: 251–247
- Earned run average: 3.50
- Shutouts: 34
- Innings pitched: 4,086
- Strikeouts: 1,684
- Stats at Baseball Reference

Teams
- As player: Nishitetsu Lions/Taiheiyo Club Lions/Crown Lighter Lions/Seibu Lions (1969–1988); As manager: Seibu Lions (1995–2001)

Career highlights and awards
- 2× Pacific League MVP (1983, 1987); 5× Japan Series champion (1982, 1983, 1986–1988); Japan Series MVP (1982)

Member of the Japanese

Baseball Hall of Fame
- Induction: 2010

Osamu Higashio (東尾 修, Higashio Osamu; born May 18, 1950) is a Japanese former baseball player who played in the Japanese professional leagues from 1969–1988, being remembered as one of the leading Japanese pitchers in the 1980s. He also was manager of the Seibu Lions from 1995 to 2001.

== Professional career ==
Higashio was a star in the Koshien high school baseball tournament, helping his team advance to the semi-finals in the spring of 1968. He was drafted in the first round by the Nishitetsu Lions (the current Saitama Seibu Lions) later that year. He lost confidence in his pitching ability after seeing the high level of pitching in the Pacific League, and requested the team to convert him to a position player. The team accepted his request, but quickly withdrew it when the Black Mist Scandal erupted in the 1969 off-season. The ace of the Lions pitching staff, Masaaki Ikenaga, was banished from the professional leagues because of the scandal, and Higashio was forced into pitching a full year in the Lions starting rotation. His inexperience resulted in a 5.15 ERA in 40 games that season. Higashio made improvements in the following years, but still led the league in losses in 1971 and 1972. During the 1972 season in particular he pitched over 300 innings, leading the league not only in losses, but in hits, runs, and home runs given up. He also allowed over 100 walks in three consecutive seasons beginning in 1971.

The Lions team was sold by the Nishi-Nippon Railroad in 1973, becoming the Taiheiyo Club Lions, and in 1978 he was sold again when the team became the Crown Lighter Lions. It was during this turbulent period that Higashio emerged as the ace of the Lions pitching staff. In the 1975 season he had a very respectable 2.38 ERA while leading the league with 23 wins. He won 23 games again in 1978, pitching over 300 innings for the third time in his career. The Lions finally obtained financial stability in 1979, becoming the Seibu Lions, and won the Japan Series in 1982 and 1983. Higashio marked the lowest ERA in the league (2.92), and led the league in wins to receive the MVP award in 1983. The Lions won the Pacific League championship four years in a row from 1985–1988 (including three more Japan Series wins), and Higashio won his second MVP award in 1987. He announced his retirement in 1988.

== Beanballs ==
Higashio often pitched towards the inside of the plate to intimidate opposing batters during his professional career, and he holds the Japanese career record for hit batsmen (165). He was not afraid to throw pitches close to the batter, and showed little remorse after hitting batters. In 1986, he received a beating on the mound by Kintetsu Buffaloes player Dick Davis, after hitting Davis with a pitch (Higashio continued pitching after the incident, marking the win). Many fans sympathized with Davis, and demanded that Higashio be penalized as well for hitting so many batters. Managers of rival teams accused Higashio of purposely hitting batters, since Higashio possessed excellent control, and there was no way he could accidentally hit batters so often. Higashio has maintained that he never threw a pitch with the intention of hitting the batter.

== Career statistics ==
- **Bolded figures** are league-leading ones

Year	Team	G	CG	SHO	W	L	SV	IP	H	HR	BB+HBP	SO	ER	ERA(Place)
1969	Nishitetsu Lions	8	0	0	0	2	0	15.0	16	2	15	11	14	8.40
1970	Nishitetsu Lions	40	3	0	11	18	0	173.1	183	22	97	94	99	5.15(21)
1971	Nishitetsu Lions	**51**	3	0	8	**16**	0	221.1	198	20	**133**	109	92	3.75(17)
1972	Nishitetsu Lions	55	13	2	18	**25**	0	**309.2**	**313**	**37**	122	171	**126**	3.66(15)
1973	Taiheiyo Club Lions	48	14	5	15	14	0	257.2	**250**	22	**114**	104	**94**	3.29(14)
1974	Taiheiyo Club Lions	27	7	1	6	9	0	123.0	116	12	53	58	47	3.44
1975	Taiheiyo Club Lions	**54**	**25**	**4**	**23**	**15**	7	**317.2**	**287**	14	70	**154**	84	2.38(3)
1976	Taiheiyo Club Lions	43	15	2	13	11	5	243.1	**256**	14	59	93	**86**	3.19(14)
1977	Crown Lighter Lions	42	17	1	11	**20**	4	241.2	**259**	**30**	70	108	**104**	3.87(20)
1978	Crown Lighter Lions	45	28	1	23	14	1	**303.1**	**299**	25	69	126	99	2.94(8)
1979	Seibu Lions	23	10	1	6	13	0	155.0	181	19	39	61	78	4.53(21)
1980	Seibu Lions	33	18	1	17	13	0	235.1	**258**	28	53	84	99	3.79(7)
1981	Seibu Lions	27	11	1	8	11	0	181.0	192	24	58	55	77	3.83(16)
1982	Seibu Lions	28	11	2	10	11	1	183.2	179	20	52	59	67	3.28(9)
1983	Seibu Lions	32	11	**3**	**18**	9	2	213.0	198	14	57	72	69	**2.92(1)**
1984	Seibu Lions	32	**20**	3	14	**14**	0	**241.1**	227	24	61	84	89	3.32(3)
1985	Seibu Lions	31	11	**3**	17	3	1	174.1	164	19	53	74	64	3.30(4)
1986	Seibu Lions	31	8	0	12	11	2	168.1	183	29	34	52	79	4.22(13)
1987	Seibu Lions	28	17	3	15	9	0	222.2	215	16	35	85	64	2.59(2)
1988	Seibu Lions	19	5	1	6	9	0	105.2	121	21	33	30	57	4.85
Career Total		697	247	34	251	247	23	4086	4095	412	1267	1684	1588	3.50

== Managerial career ==
Higashio worked as a sports commentator for various television networks before returning to the Lions in 1995 as manager. Higashio drafted several top players, and recruited Darrin Jackson and Orestes Destrade from the major leagues, but ended up in 3rd place in his first two seasons as manager. The emergence of several young players, including Kazuo Matsui, put the Lions over the top in Higashio's third year, and the team won consecutive league championships in 1997 and 1998 (the Lions lost the Japanese championship series both years). Pitchers Shinji Mori, Daisuke Matsuzaka, Fumiya Nishiguchi and Denney Tomori also emerged during Higashio's tenure as manager. The Lions placed in 2nd in 1999 and 2000, and fell to 3rd place in 2001, and Higashio resigned from his post at the end of 2001.

He has currently returned to his role as a sports commentator. In September, 2006, he became the head of the Tokyo Apache Japanese professional basketball team.

Higashio served as the pitching coach for the Japanese national baseball team in the 2013 World Baseball Classic.

== Personal life ==
Higashio's daughter, Riko Higashio, is a professional golfer.
