= Takashi Nishimoto =

Japanese baseball player and coach (born 1956)

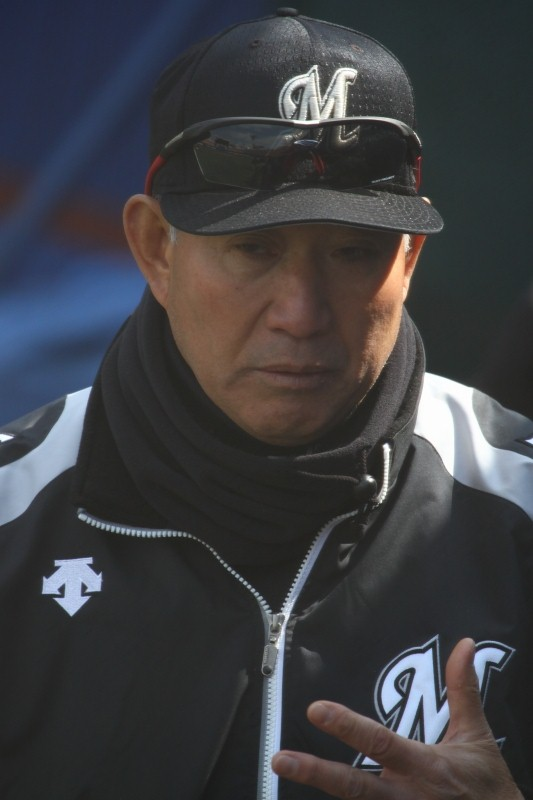
- Pitcher
- Born: June 27, 1956 (age 69); Matsuyama, Ehime
- Bats: Right Throws: Right

Career statistics
- Win–loss record: 165–128
- Earned run average: 3.20
- Strikeouts: 1,239
- Stats at Baseball Reference

Teams
- As player: Yomiuri Giants (1976–1988, 1994); Chunichi Dragons (1989–1992); Orix BlueWave (1993); As coach: Hanshin Tigers (2003); Chiba Lotte Marines (2010–2012); Orix Buffaloes (2013–2014); Hanwha Eagles (2015)

Takashi Nishimoto (西本 聖, Nishimoto Takashi; born June 27, 1956) is a Japanese baseball coach and retired pitcher. He played in Nippon Professional Baseball (NPB) for the Yomiuri Giants, Chunichi Dragons, and Orix Blue Wave from 1976 through 1993.

In 1981, Nishimoto won the Eiji Sawamura Award. Winning the 1981 Japan Series, he was named the Japan Series Most Valuable Player.

Nishimoto won seven straight Gold Glove Awards from 1979 through 1985. He won the Nippon Professional Baseball Comeback Player of the Year Award in 1989.

After his retirement as a player, Nishimoto coached for the Hanshin Tigers and the Chiba Lotte Marines. In 2013, he coached the Orix Buffaloes.

His brother, Akikazu Nishimoto, played in NPB.
