= Yukio Nishimoto =

Japanese baseball player and manager (1920–2011)

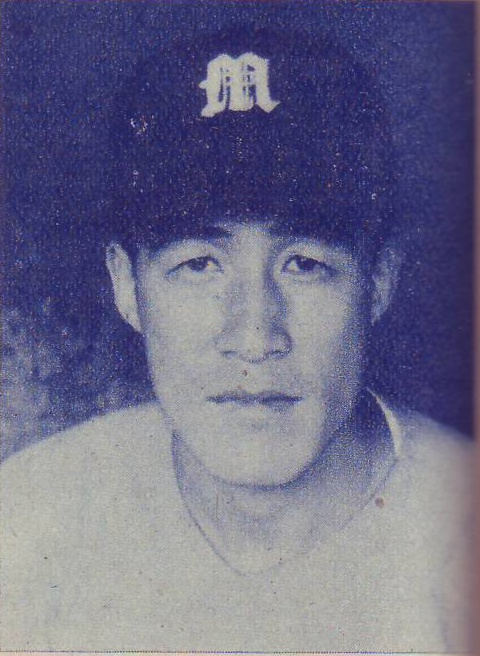
- Nishimoto in 1955
- First baseman/Manager
- Born: 25 April 1920; Wakayama, Wakayama, Japan
- Died: 25 November 2011 (aged 91); Takarazuka, Hyōgo, Japan
- Batted: Left Threw: Left

debut
- 1950, for the Mainichi Orions

Last appearance
- 1955, for the Mainichi Orions

NPB statistics
- Batting average: .244
- Home runs: 6
- Hits: 276
- Managerial record: 1384–1163

Teams
- As player: Mainichi Orions (1950–1955); As manager: Daimai Orions (1960); Hankyu Braves (1963–1973); Kintetsu Buffaloes (1974–1981)

Career highlights and awards
- As player: Japan Series champion (1950); As manager: Matsutaro Shoriki Award (1979)

Member of the Japanese

Baseball Hall of Fame
- Induction: 1988

Yukio Nishimoto (西本 幸雄, Nishimoto Yukio; 25 April 1920 – 25 November 2011) was a Japanese baseball player and manager. He played for the Mainichi Orions from 1950 to 1955. In nearly 500 games for the Orions, he batted .244 and was on the field for the Orions winning the 1950 Japan Series.

As a manager he won eight Pacific League pennants for three different teams: Daimai Orions, Hankyu Braves, and the Kintetsu Buffaloes. Only one other person has won pennants for three different teams since Nishimoto. However, his clubs lost in the Japan Series each time, earning him the nickname "Great Tragic Leader". Nishimoto was inducted into the Japanese Baseball Hall of Fame in 1988. He died of heart failure on 25 November 2011 at the age of 91.
