= Korakuen Stadium =

Stadium in Tokyo, Japan

Coordinates: 35°42′16″N 139°45′12″E

- 後楽園スタジアム
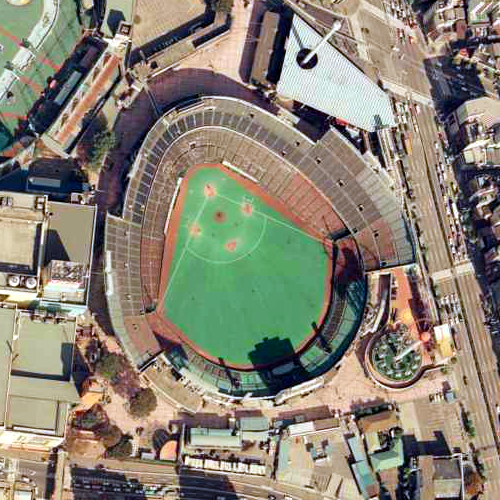
- Korakuen Stadium in 1984
- Interactive map of Korakuen Stadium
- Address: 1-3-61 Koraku
- Location: Bunkyō, Tokyo
- Owner: Korakuen Stadium Company, Ltd.
- Capacity: 42,337
- Field size: Left Field – 87.8 m (288 ft); Left-Center – 110 m (361 ft); Center Field – 120.7 m (396 ft); Right-Center – 110 m (361 ft); Right Field – 87.8 m (288 ft)

Construction
- Opened: 1937
- Closed: 1987
- Demolished: 1988
- Architect: Ryutaro Furuhashi
- Main contractor: Tobishima Corporation

Tenants
- Tokyo Senators/Tsubasa/Taiyō/Nishitetsu (JBL) (1936–1943) Korakuen Eagles/Kurowashi/Yamato (JBL) (1936–1943); Yomiuri Giants (NPB Central League) (1938–1987); Intercity baseball tournament (1938–1987); Gold Star/Kinsei Stars/Daeiei Stars/Daiei Unions (1946–1957); Chunichi Dragons (NPB Central League) (1948); Mainichi Orions (1950–1962) (NPB Pacific League); Kokutetsu Swallows (NPB Central League) (1950–1963) Nippon Ham Fighters (NPB Pacific League) (1964–1987)

Korakuen Stadium (後楽園球場, Kōrakuen Kyūjō) was a stadium in Tokyo, Japan. Completed in 1937, it was originally used for baseball, and was home to the Yomiuri Giants for nearly fifty years. For various periods of time, it was also the home stadium of six other professional Japanese baseball teams, including the Mainichi Orions, the Kokutetsu Swallows, and the Nippon Ham Fighters. Korakuen was the home of the Intercity baseball tournament for nearly fifty years. It originally hosted the Japanese Baseball Hall of Fame, now located at Korakuen's successor venue, the Tokyo Dome. In the 1970s and 1980s Korakuen was also used as a concert venue for major performers. The ballpark had a capacity of 50,000 people.

== Baseball stadium ==
From 1936 to 1943, Korakuen was the home stadium of the Tokyo Senators (also known as Tsubasa, Taiyō, and Nishitetsu) of the Japanese Baseball League (JBL). In 1942 Korakuen Stadium played host to a memorable 28-inning, 311-pitch complete game effort by Michio Nishizawa of the Nagoya Club against Taiyō.

From 1936 to 1943, Korakuen was also the home stadium of the Korakuen Eagles (also known as Kurowashi and Yamato) of the JBL.

Korakuen hosted Tokyo's Intercity baseball tournament from 1938 to 1987.

Korakuen Stadium was the home of the Yomiuri Giants from 1938 until 1988, when the team moved next door, to the Tokyo Dome, which sits on the former site of Korakuen's velodrome.

The Daiei Stars (also known as Gold Star and the Kinsei Stars) played their home games at Korakuen from 1946 to 1956. In 1957 the Stars merged with the Takahashi Unions to form the Daiei Unions, and the following year the Unions merged with the Mainichi Orions — which had also played their home games at Korakuen since 1950 — to form the Daimai Orions. The Orions (later known as the Chiba Lotte Marines) played at Korakuen through the 1962 season, when the team moved to Tokyo Stadium.

The Chunichi Dragons played their homes games during the 1948 season in Korakuen.

The Japanese Baseball Hall of Fame first opened in 1959 next door to Korakuen Stadium. (In 1988, the museum moved to a new site within the Tokyo Dome.)

Korakuen was the home stadium of the Kokutetsu Swallows from 1950 to 1963, when the team moved to Meiji Jingu Stadium. Korakuen then became the home stadium of the Nippon Ham Fighters until 1987, when, like the Yomiuri Giants, the Fighters also moved to the Tokyo Dome.

=== American football ===
On August 16, 1976, Korakuen hosted the first NFL game played outside of North America, when the St. Louis Cardinals defeated the San Diego Chargers 20–10 in a preseason game before 38,000 people.

Korakuen Stadium also hosted the Mirage Bowl from 1977 to 1979.

== Concert venue ==
Korakuen was the site of the all-day "For Freedom" show, on April 4, 1978, which was the marathon farewell performance by Japanese girl group Candies. On July 23 of that same year, Pink Lady performed in front of over 100,000 fans at the stadium. Three years later on March 31, 1981, Pink Lady returned to perform their final concert at the time.

On June 20–22, 1987, Madonna sold all of the 65,000 available tickets for three concerts (around 21,600 per show) on the Who's That Girl World Tour in a few hours. The second night was shown on TV in Japan and was later released on VHS and LaserDisc.

Michael Jackson kicked off the Bad World Tour, his first tour as a solo artist, with three sold-out concerts in September 12-13-14, 1987, at the stadium, with total attendance of 135,000. (about 45,000 per show)

== Closure and demolition ==
Korakuen Stadium closed on November 8, 1987, and demolition began the next day, which was completed in February 1988. The former site of the right-center field area is now occupied by a high-rise, the Tokyo Dome Hotel. The remainder of the former ballpark site is a plaza for the Tokyo Dome and the hotel.
