= List of Saitama Seibu Lions seasons =

The Saitama Seibu Lions are a professional baseball team in Japan's Pacific League based north of Tokyo in Tokorozawa, Saitama Prefecture. They were established in 1950. Before 1979, they were based in Fukuoka, Fukuoka Prefecture, in Kyushu. The team is owned by a subsidiary of Seibu Railway, which in turn is owned by the Seibu Holdings.

In 76 seasons, they have won the Japan Series thirteen times (1956, 1957, 1958, 1982, 1983, 1986, 1987, 1988, 1990, 1991, 1992, 2004, 2008) and have finished first place in the Pacific League 23 times, most recently in 2019. In the playoff era of the Pacific League (1973–1982, 2004-present), the Lions have reached the postseason thirteen times, most recently doing so in 2022.

== Table key ==
Key to symbols and terms in season table
W	Number of regular season wins
L	Number of regular season losses
T	Number of regular season ties
GB	Games behind from league's first-place team^{[a]}
ROY	Pacific League Rookie of the Year Award
MVP	Pacific League Most Valuable Player Award
ESA	Eiji Sawamura Award^{[b]}
MSA	Matsutaro Shoriki Award
Series MVP	Japan Series Most Valuable Player Award
FSA	Fighting Spirit Award

== Season-by-season records ==
Japan Series Champions (1950–present) †	Pacific League Pennant (1950–present)	Playoff / Climax Series Berth (1973–1982, 2004–present) ^

Season	League	Finish	Wins	Losses	Ties	Win%	GB	Playoffs	Awards
Nishitetsu Clippers / Lions
1950	Pacific	5th	51	67	2	.432	31.5		
1951	Pacific	2nd	53	42	10	.558	18.5		
1952	Pacific	3rd	67	52	1	.563	8.5		
1953	Pacific	4th	57	61	2	.483	13.5		
1954	Pacific	1st	90	47	3	.657	–	Lost Japan Series (Dragons) 4–3	Hiroshi Oshita (MVP)
1955	Pacific	2nd	90	50	4	.643	9		
1956	Pacific	1st	96	51	7	.646	–	Won Japan Series (Giants) 4–2	Futoshi Nakanishi (MVP); Yasumitsu Toyoda (Series MVP); Kazuhisa Inao (FSA)
1957	Pacific	1st	83	44	5	.648	–	Won Japan Series (Giants) 4–0–1	Kazuhisa Inao (MVP); Hiroshi Ohshita (Series MVP)
1958	Pacific	1st	78	47	5	.619	–	Won Japan Series (Giants) 4–3	Kazuhisa Inao (MVP); Kazuhisa Inao (Series MVP)
1959	Pacific	4th	66	64	14	.508	22		
1960	Pacific	3rd	70	60	6	.538	12		
1961	Pacific	3rd	81	56	3	.589	5.5		
1962	Pacific	3rd	62	68	6	.477	16		
1963	Pacific	1st	86	60	4	.589	–	Lost Japan Series (Giants) 4–3	
1964	Pacific	5th	63	81	6	.438	19.5		
1965	Pacific	3rd	72	64	4	.529	15.5		
1966	Pacific	2nd	75	55	8	.577	4		
1967	Pacific	2nd	66	64	10	.508	9		
1968	Pacific	5th	56	74	3	.431	24		
1969	Pacific	5th	51	75	4	.405	25		
1970	Pacific	6th	43	78	9	.355	34		
1971	Pacific	6th	38	84	8	.311	43.5		
1972	Pacific	6th	47	80	3	.370	32.5		
Taiheiyo Club Lions
1973	Pacific	4th/5th	59	64	7	.480			
1974	Pacific	3rd/4th	59	64	7	.480			
1975	Pacific	2nd/4th	58	62	10	.483			
1976	Pacific	6th/6th	44	76	10	.367			
Crown Lighter Lions
1977	Pacific	6th/5th	49	73	8	.402			
1978	Pacific	4th/5th	51	67	12	.432			
Seibu Lions
1979	Pacific	6th/5th	45	73	12	.381			
1980	Pacific	6th/4th	62	64	4	.492			
1981	Pacific	2nd/5th	61	61	8	.500			
1982	Pacific	1st/3rd	68	58	4	.540	–	Won Pacific League playoffs (Fighters) 3–1; Won Japan Series (Dragons) 4–2	Osamu Higashio (Series MVP)
1983	Pacific	1st	86	40	4	.683	–	Won Japan Series (Giants) 4–3	Osamu Higashio (MVP); Takuji Ota (Series MVP)
1984	Pacific	3rd	62	61	7	.504	14.5		
1985	Pacific	1st	79	45	6	.637	–	Lost Japan Series (Tigers) 4–2	
1986	Pacific	1st	68	49	13	.581	–	Won Japan Series (Carp) 4–3–1	Hiromichi Ishige (MVP); Kimiyasu Kudoh (Series MVP)
1987	Pacific	1st	71	45	14	.612	–	Won Japan Series (Giants) 4–2	Osamu Higashio (MVP); Kimiyasu Kudoh (Series MVP)
1989	Pacific	1st	73	51	6	.589	–	Won Japan Series (Dragons) 4–1	Hiromichi Ishige (Series MVP)
1989	Pacific	3rd	69	53	8	.566	0.5		
1990	Pacific	1st	81	45	4	.643	–	Won Japan Series (Giants) 4–0	Orestes Destrade (Series MVP)
1991	Pacific	1st	81	43	6	.653	–	Won Japan Series (Carp) 4–3	Taigen Kaku (MVP); Koji Akiyama (Series MVP)
1992	Pacific	1st	80	47	3	.630	–	Won Japan Series (Swallows) 4–3	Takehiro Ishii (MVP); Takehiro Ishii (Series MVP)
1993	Pacific	1st	74	53	3	.583	–	Lost Japan Series (Swallows) 4–3	Kimiyasu Kudo (MVP)
1994	Pacific	1st	76	52	2	.594	–	Lost Japan Series (Giants) 4–2	
1995	Pacific	3rd	67	57	6	.540	12.5		
1996	Pacific	3rd	62	64	4	.492	13		
1997	Pacific	1st	76	56	3	.576	–	Lost Japan Series (Giants) 4–1	Fumiya Nishiguchi (MVP)
1998	Pacific	1st	70	61	4	.534	–	Lost Japan Series (BayStars) 4–2	Kazuo Matsui (MVP)
1999	Pacific	2nd	75	59	1	.560	4		
2000	Pacific	2nd	69	61	5	.531	2.5		
2001	Pacific	3rd	73	67	0	.521	6		
2002	Pacific	1st	90	49	1	.647	–	Lost Japan Series (Giants) 4–0	Alex Cabrera (MVP)
2003	Pacific	2nd	77	61	2	.558	5.5		
2004	Pacific	1st	74	58	1	.561	–	Won Pacific League playoffs First Stage (Fighters) 2–1; Won Pacific League Playoffs Second Stage (Hawks) 3–2; Won Japan Series (Dragons) 4–3	Takashi Ishii (Series MVP)
2005	Pacific	3rd	67	69	0	.493	23		
2006	Pacific	2nd	80	54	2	.597	1		
2007	Pacific	5th	66	76	2	.465	14.5		
Saitama Seibu Lions
2008	Pacific	1st	76	64	4	.543	–	Won Climax Series Second Stage (Fighters) 4–2; Won Japan Series (Giants) 4–3	Takayuki Kishi (Series MVP)
2009	Pacific	4th	70	70	4	.500	11		
2010	Pacific	2nd	78	65	1	.545	0^{[A]}	Lost Climax Series First Stage (Marines) 2–0	
2011	Pacific	3rd	68	67	9	.504	20.5	Won Climax Series First Stage (Marines) 2–0; Lost Climax Series Final Stage (Hawks) 4–0	
2012	Pacific	2nd	72	63	9	.533	3	Lost Climax Series First Stage (Hawks) 2–1	
2013	Pacific	2nd	74	66	4	.529	7.5	Lost Climax Series First Stage (Marines) 2–1	
2014	Pacific	5th	63	77	4	.450	16		
2015	Pacific	4th	69	69	5	.500	20.5		
2016	Pacific	4th	64	76	3	.457	23		
2017	Pacific	2nd	79	61	3	.564	13.5	Lost Climax Series First Stage (Golden Eagles) 2–1	
2018	Pacific	1st	88	53	2	.624	–	Lost Climax Series Final Stage (Hawks) 4–2	Hotaka Yamakawa (MVP)
2019	Pacific	1st	80	62	1	.563	–	Lost Climax Series Final Stage (Hawks) 4–1	Tomoya Mori (MVP)
2020	Pacific	3rd	58	58	4	.500	15.5	^{[B]}	
2021	Pacific	6th	55	70	18	.440	15		
2022	Pacific	3rd	72	68	3	.514	3.5	Lost Climax Series First Stage (Hawks) 2–0	
2023	Pacific	5th	65	77	1	.458	22.5		
2024	Pacific	6th	49	91	3	.350	42		
2025	Pacific	5th	63	77	3	.450	24.5		
2026	Pacific	2nd	79	60	4	.568	11.5	Lost Climax Series First Stage (Fighters) 2–1	

== Notes ==
- ^{a} This is determined by calculating the difference in wins plus the difference in losses divided by two.
- ^{b} The award was not open to the Pacific League until 1989. The award was not given out in the following years: 1971, 1980, 1984, 2000, 2019, and 2024.

^{[A]} Excluding ties, the Fukuoka SoftBank Hawks had a record of 76–63 (.5467) while the Lions had a record of 78–65 (.5454)
^{[B]} Due to the COVID-19 pandemic in 2020, NPB saw both of their leagues modify their playoff format. The Pacific League decided to modify the traditional Climax Series format and eliminate the First Stage series to instead play only one modified Final Stage series (between the top-2 teams) while the Central League sent the first-place team directly to the Japan Series, which in this case was Yomiuri.
