= 1956 Nippon Professional Baseball season =

1956 NPB season
- League: Nippon Professional Baseball
- Sport: Baseball

Central League pennant
- League champions: Yomiuri Giants
- Runners-up: Osaka Tigers
- Season MVP: Takehiko Bessho (YOM)

Pacific League pennant
- League champions: Nishitetsu Lions
- Runners-up: Nankai Hawks
- Season MVP: Futoshi Nakanishi (NIS)

Japan Series
- Champions: Nishitetsu Lions
- Runners-up: Yomiuri Giants
- Finals MVP: Yasumitsu Toyoda (NIS)

NPB seasons
- ← 1955 1957 →

The 1956 Nippon Professional Baseball season was the seventh season of operation of Nippon Professional Baseball (NPB).

== Regular season ==
=== Standings ===
Central League regular season standings
Team	G	W	L	T	Pct.	GB
Yomiuri Giants	130	82	44	4	.646	—
Osaka Tigers	130	79	50	1	.612	4.5
Chunichi Dragons	130	74	56	0	.569	10.0
Kokutetsu Swallows	130	61	65	4	.485	21.0
Hiroshima Carp	130	45	82	3	.358	27.5
Taiyo Whales	130	43	87	0	.331	41.0

Pacific League regular season standings
Team	G	W	L	T	Pct.	GB
Nishitetsu Lions	154	96	51	7	.646	—
Nankai Hawks	154	96	52	6	.643	0.5
Hankyu Braves	154	88	64	2	.578	10.5
Mainichi Orions	154	84	66	4	.558	13.5
Kintetsu Pearls	154	68	82	4	.455	29.5
Toei Flyers	154	58	92	4	.390	39.5
Daiei Stars	154	57	94	3	.380	41.0
Takahashi Unions	154	52	98	4	.351	45.5

== Postseason ==
=== Japan Series ===
PL Nishitetsu Lions (4) vs. CL Yomiuri Giants (2)

Game	Date	Score	Location	Time	Attendance
1	October 10	Nishitetsu Lions – 0, Yomiuri Giants – 4	Korakuen Stadium	2:07	24,632
2	October 11	Nishitetsu Lions – 6, Yomiuri Giants – 3	Korakuen Stadium	2:18	19,108
3	October 13	Yomiuri Giants – 4, Nishitetsu Lions – 5	Heiwadai Stadium	2:41	23,528
4	October 14	Yomiuri Giants – 0, Nishitetsu Lions – 4	Heiwadai Stadium	1:55	24,459
5	October 15	Yomiuri Giants – 12, Nishitetsu Lions – 7	Heiwadai Stadium	3:16	19,042
6	October 17	Nishitetsu Lions – 5, Yomiuri Giants – 1	Korakuen Stadium	2:13	27,994

== League leaders ==
=== Central League ===
Batting leaders
Stat	Player	Team	Total
Batting average	Wally Yonamine	Yomiuri Giants	.338
Home runs	Noboru Aota	Taiyo Whales	25
Runs batted in	Andy Miyamoto	Yomiuri Giants	69
Runs	Wally Yonamine	Yomiuri Giants	86
Hits	Tetsuharu Kawakami	Yomiuri Giants	160
Stolen bases	Yoshio Yoshida	Osaka Tigers	50

Pitching leaders
Stat	Player	Team	Total
Wins	Takehiko Bessho	Yomiuri Giants	27
Losses	Noboru Akiyama	Taiyo Whales	25
Earned run average	Shozo Watanabe	Osaka Tigers	1.45
Strikeouts	Masaichi Kaneda	Kokutetsu Swallows	316
Innings pitched	Noboru Akiyama	Taiyo Whales	379 2/3

=== Pacific League ===
Batting leaders
Stat	Player	Team	Total
Batting average	Yasumitsu Toyoda	Nishitetsu Lions	.325
Home runs	Futoshi Nakanishi	Nishitetsu Lions	29
Runs batted in	Futoshi Nakanishi	Nishitetsu Lions	95
Runs	Chico Barbon	Hankyu Braves	94
Hits	Shinya Sasaki	Takahashi Unions	180
Stolen bases	Akiteru Kono	Hankyu Braves	85

Pitching leaders
Stat	Player	Team	Total
Wins	Masayoshi Miura	Daiei Stars	29
Losses	Yasuo Yonekawa	Toei Flyers	21
Earned run average	Kazuhisa Inao	Nishitetsu Lions	1.06
Strikeouts	Takao Kajimoto	Hankyu Braves	327
Innings pitched	Yukio Shimabara	Nishitetsu Lions	373 2/3

== Awards ==
- Most Valuable Player
  - Takehiko Bessho, Yomiuri Giants (CL)
  - Futoshi Nakanishi, Nishitetsu Lions (PL)
- Rookie of the Year
  - Noboru Akiyama, Taiyo Whales (CL)
  - Kazuhisa Inao, Nishitetsu Lions (PL)
- Eiji Sawamura Award
  - Masaichi Kaneda, Kokutetsu Swallows (CL)

Central League Best Nine Award winners
Position	Player	Team
Pitcher	Takehiko Bessho	Yomiuri Giants
Catcher	Shigeru Fujio	Yomiuri Giants
First baseman	Tetsuharu Kawakami	Yomiuri Giants
Second baseman	Noboru Inoue	Chunichi Dragons
Third baseman	Toshikazu Kodama	Chunichi Dragons
Shortstop	Yoshio Yoshida	Osaka Tigers
Outfielder	Wally Yonamine	Yomiuri Giants
Outfielder	Kenjiro Tamiya	Osaka Tigers
Outfielder	Noboru Aota	Taiyo Whales

Pacific League Best Nine Award winners
Position	Player	Team
Pitcher	Takao Kajimoto	Hankyu Braves
Catcher	Katsuya Nomura	Nankai Hawks
First baseman	Kihachi Enomoto	Mainichi Orions
Second baseman	Shinya Sasaki	Takahashi Unions
Third baseman	Futoshi Nakanishi	Nishitetsu Lions
Shortstop	Yasumitsu Toyoda	Nishitetsu Lions
Outfielder	Kazuhiro Yamauchi	Mainichi Orions
Outfielder	Katsuki Tokura	Hankyu Braves
Outfielder	Kohei Sugiyama	Nankai Hawks

== See also ==
- 1956 Major League Baseball season
