= 1957 Nippon Professional Baseball season =

1957 NPB season
- League: Nippon Professional Baseball
- Sport: Baseball

Central League pennant
- League champions: Yomiuri Giants
- Runners-up: Osaka Tigers
- Season MVP: Wally Yonamine (YOM)

Pacific League pennant
- League champions: Nishitetsu Lions
- Runners-up: Nankai Hawks
- Season MVP: Kazuhisa Inao (NIS)

Japan Series
- Champions: Nishitetsu Lions
- Runners-up: Yomiuri Giants
- Finals MVP: Hiroshi Oshita (NIS)

NPB seasons
- ← 1956 1958 →

The 1957 Nippon Professional Baseball season was the eighth season of operation of Nippon Professional Baseball (NPB).

== Regular season ==
=== Standings ===
Central League regular season standings
Team	G	W	L	T	Pct.	GB
Yomiuri Giants	130	74	53	3	.581	—
Osaka Tigers	130	73	54	3	.573	1.0
Chunichi Dragons	130	70	57	3	.569	4.0
Kokutetsu Swallows	130	58	68	4	.462	15.5
Hiroshima Carp	130	54	75	1	.419	21.0
Taiyo Whales	130	52	74	4	.415	21.5

Pacific League regular season standings
Team	G	W	L	T	Pct.	GB
Nishitetsu Lions	132	83	44	5	.648	—
Nankai Hawks	132	78	53	1	.595	7.0
Mainichi Orions	132	75	52	5	.587	8.0
Hankyu Braves	132	71	55	6	.561	11.5
Toei Flyers	132	56	73	3	.436	28.0
Kintetsu Pearls	132	44	82	6	.356	38.5
Daiei Unions	132	41	89	2	.318	43.5

== Postseason ==
=== Japan Series ===
PL Nishitetsu Lions (4) vs. CL Yomiuri Giants (0)

Game	Date	Score	Location	Time	Attendance
1	October 26	Yomiuri Giants – 2, Nishitetsu Lions – 3	Heiwadai Stadium	2:38	23,992
2	October 27	Yomiuri Giants – 1, Nishitetsu Lions – 2	Heiwadai Stadium	2:18	24,373
3	October 30	Nishitetsu Lions – 5, Yomiuri Giants – 4	Korakuen Stadium	2:32	30,484
4	October 31	Nishitetsu Lions – 0, Yomiuri Giants – 0	Korakuen Stadium	3:01	27,649
5	November 1	Nishitetsu Lions – 6, Yomiuri Giants – 5	Korakuen Stadium	2:37	30,519

== League leaders ==
=== Central League ===
Batting leaders
Stat	Player	Team	Total
Batting average	Wally Yonamine	Yomiuri Giants	.343
Home runs	Noboru Aota; Takao Sato	Taiyo Whales; Kokutetsu Swallows	22
Runs batted in	Andy Miyamoto	Yomiuri Giants	78
Runs	Hiroji Okajima	Chunichi Dragons	71
Hits	Wally Yonamine	Yomiuri Giants	160
Stolen bases	Tokuji Iida	Kokutetsu Swallows	40

Pitching leaders
Stat	Player	Team	Total
Wins	Masaichi Kaneda	Kokutetsu Swallows	28
Losses	Noboru Akiyama	Taiyo Whales	27
Earned run average	Masaichi Kaneda	Kokutetsu Swallows	1.63
Strikeouts	Noboru Akiyama	Taiyo Whales	312
Innings pitched	Noboru Akiyama	Taiyo Whales	406

=== Pacific League ===
Batting leaders
Stat	Player	Team	Total
Batting average	Kazuhiro Yamauchi	Mainichi Orions	.331
Home runs	Katsuya Nomura	Nankai Hawks	30
Runs batted in	Futoshi Nakanishi	Nishitetsu Lions	100
Runs	Yasumitsu Toyoda	Nishitetsu Lions	92
Hits	Futoshi Nakanishi	Nishitetsu Lions	154
Stolen bases	Yosuke Terada	Hankyu Braves	56

Pitching leaders
Stat	Player	Team	Total
Wins	Kazuhisa Inao	Nishitetsu Lions	35
Losses	Masayoshi Miura	Daiei Unions	21
Earned run average	Kazuhisa Inao	Nishitetsu Lions	1.37
Strikeouts	Takao Kajimoto	Hankyu Braves	301
Innings pitched	Kazuhisa Inao	Nishitetsu Lions	373 2/3

== Awards ==
- Most Valuable Player
  - Wally Yonamine, Yomiuri Giants (CL)
  - Kazuhisa Inao, Nishitetsu Lions (PL)
- Rookie of the Year
  - Motoshi Fujita, Yomiuri Giants (CL)
  - Tamotsu Kimura, Nankai Hawks (PL)
- Eiji Sawamura Award
  - Masaichi Kaneda, Kokutetsu Swallows (CL)

Central League Best Nine Award winners
Position	Player	Team
Pitcher	Masaichi Kaneda	Kokutetsu Swallows
Catcher	Shigeru Fujio	Yomiuri Giants
First baseman	Tetsuharu Kawakami	Yomiuri Giants
Second baseman	Noboru Inoue	Chunichi Dragons
Third baseman	Nobukazu Miyake	Osaka Tigers
Shortstop	Yoshio Yoshida	Osaka Tigers
Outfielder	Wally Yonamine	Yomiuri Giants
Outfielder	Kenjiro Tamiya	Osaka Tigers
Outfielder	Noboru Aota	Taiyo Whales

Pacific League Best Nine Award winners
Position	Player	Team
Pitcher	Kazuhisa Inao	Nishitetsu Lions
Catcher	Katsuya Nomura	Nankai Hawks
First baseman	Kenichiro Okamoto	Hankyu Braves
Second baseman	Isami Okamoto	Nankai Hawks
Third baseman	Futoshi Nakanishi	Nishitetsu Lions
Shortstop	Yasumitsu Toyoda	Nishitetsu Lions
Outfielder	Kazuhiro Yamauchi	Mainichi Orions
Outfielder	Hiroshi Oshita	Nishitetsu Lions
Outfielder	Shoichi Busujima	Toei Flyers

== See also ==
- 1957 Major League Baseball season
