= 1958 Nippon Professional Baseball season =

1958 NPB season
- League: Nippon Professional Baseball
- Sport: Baseball

Central League pennant
- League champions: Yomiuri Giants
- Runners-up: Osaka Tigers
- Season MVP: Motoshi Fujita (YOM)

Pacific League pennant
- League champions: Nishitetsu Lions
- Runners-up: Nankai Hawks
- Season MVP: Kazuhisa Inao (NIS)

Japan Series
- Champions: Nishitetsu Lions
- Runners-up: Yomiuri Giants
- Finals MVP: Kazuhisa Inao (NIS)

NPB seasons
- ← 1957 1959 →

The 1958 Nippon Professional Baseball season was the ninth season of operation of Nippon Professional Baseball (NPB).

== Regular season ==
=== Standings ===
Central League regular season standings
Team	G	W	L	T	Pct.	GB
Yomiuri Giants	130	77	52	1	.596	—
Osaka Tigers	130	72	58	0	.554	5.5
Chunichi Dragons	130	66	59	5	.527	9.0
Kokutetsu Swallows	130	58	68	4	.462	17.5
Hiroshima Carp	130	54	68	8	.446	19.5
Taiyo Whales	130	51	73	6	.415	23.5

Pacific League regular season standings
Team	G	W	L	T	Pct.	GB
Nishitetsu Lions	130	78	47	5	.619	—
Nankai Hawks	130	77	48	5	.612	1.0
Hankyu Braves	130	73	51	6	.585	4.5
Daimai Orions	130	62	63	5	.496	16.0
Toei Flyers	130	57	70	3	.450	22.0
Kintetsu Pearls	130	29	97	4	.238	49.5

== Postseason ==
=== Japan Series ===
PL Nishitetsu Lions (4) vs. CL Yomiuri Giants (3)

Game	Date	Score	Location	Time	Attendance
1	October 11	Nishitetsu Lions – 2, Yomiuri Giants – 9	Korakuen Stadium	3:02	35,217
2	October 12	Nishitetsu Lions – 3, Yomiuri Giants – 7	Korakuen Stadium	2:21	35,953
3	October 14	Yomiuri Giants – 1, Nishitetsu Lions – 0	Heiwadai Stadium	2:00	31,575
4	October 16	Yomiuri Giants – 4, Nishitetsu Lions – 6	Heiwadai Stadium	2:17	27,044
5	October 17	Yomiuri Giants – 3, Nishitetsu Lions – 5	Heiwadai Stadium	2:34	25,193
6	October 20	Nishitetsu Lions – 2, Yomiuri Giants – 0	Korakuen Stadium	2:03	31,745
7	October 21	Nishitetsu Lions – 6, Yomiuri Giants – 1	Korakuen Stadium	2:23	20,961

== League leaders ==
=== Central League ===
Batting leaders
Stat	Player	Team	Total
Batting average	Kenjiro Tamiya	Osaka Tigers	.320
Home runs	Shigeo Nagashima	Yomiuri Giants	29
Runs batted in	Shigeo Nagashima	Yomiuri Giants	92
Runs	Shigeo Nagashima	Yomiuri Giants	89
Hits	Shigeo Nagashima	Yomiuri Giants	153
Stolen bases	Hiroji Okajima	Chunichi Dragons	47

Pitching leaders
Stat	Player	Team	Total
Wins	Masaichi Kaneda	Kokutetsu Swallows	31
Losses	Noboru Akiyama	Taiyo Whales	23
Earned run average	Masaichi Kaneda	Kokutetsu Swallows	1.30
Strikeouts	Masaichi Kaneda	Kokutetsu Swallows	311
Innings pitched	Motoshi Fujita; Noboru Akiyama	Yomiuri Giants; Taiyo Whales	359

=== Pacific League ===
Batting leaders
Stat	Player	Team	Total
Batting average	Futoshi Nakanishi	Nishitetsu Lions	.314
Home runs	Futoshi Nakanishi	Nishitetsu Lions	23
Runs batted in	Takao Katsuragi	Daimai Orions	85
Runs	Yoshinori Hirose	Nankai Hawks	82
Hits	Takao Katsuragi	Daimai Orions	147
Stolen bases	Chico Barbon	Hankyu Braves	38

Pitching leaders
Stat	Player	Team	Total
Wins	Kazuhisa Inao	Nishitetsu Lions	33
Losses	Mamoru Otsu	Kintetsu Pearls	22
Earned run average	Kazuhisa Inao	Nishitetsu Lions	1.42
Strikeouts	Kazuhisa Inao	Nishitetsu Lions	334
Innings pitched	Kazuhisa Inao	Nishitetsu Lions	373

== Awards ==
- Most Valuable Player
  - Motoshi Fujita, Yomiuri Giants (CL)
  - Kazuhisa Inao, Nishitetsu Lions (PL)
- Rookie of the Year
  - Shigeo Nagashima, Yomiuri Giants (CL)
  - Tadashi Sugiura, Nankai Hawks (PL)
- Eiji Sawamura Award
  - Masaichi Kaneda, Kokutetsu Swallows (CL)

Central League Best Nine Award winners
Position	Player	Team
Pitcher	Masaichi Kaneda	Kokutetsu Swallows
Catcher	Shigeru Fujio	Yomiuri Giants
First baseman	Tetsuharu Kawakami	Yomiuri Giants
Second baseman	Noboru Inoue	Chunichi Dragons
Third baseman	Shigeo Nagashima	Yomiuri Giants
Shortstop	Yoshio Yoshida	Osaka Tigers
Outfielder	Toru Mori	Chunichi Dragons
Outfielder	Wally Yonamine	Yomiuri Giants
Outfielder	Kenjiro Tamiya	Osaka Tigers

Pacific League Best Nine Award winners
Position	Player	Team
Pitcher	Kazuhisa Inao	Nishitetsu Lions
Catcher	Katsuya Nomura	Nankai Hawks
First baseman	Stanley Hashimoto	Toei Flyers
Second baseman	Chico Barbon	Hankyu Braves
Third baseman	Futoshi Nakanishi	Nishitetsu Lions
Shortstop	Takao Katsuragi	Daimai Orions
Outfielder	Seiji Sekiguchi	Nishitetsu Lions
Outfielder	Shochi Busujima	Toei Flyers
Outfielder	Kohei Sugiyama	Nankai Hawks

== See also ==
- 1958 Major League Baseball season
