= Hiromi Wada =

Japanese baseball player (1937-2009)

- Catcher
- Born: March 26, 1937; Usuki, Ōita, Japan
- Died: June 22, 2009 (aged 72); Fukuoka, Japan
- Batted: Right Threw: Right

NPB debut
- September 16, 1955, for the Nishitetsu Lions

Last appearance
- 1972, for the Nishitetsu Lions

NPB statistics
- Batting average: .257
- Home runs: 100
- Runs batted in: 486
- Stats at Baseball Reference

Teams
- As player: Nishitetsu Lions (1955–1972); As coach: Nishitetsu/Taiheiyo Club/Crown Lighter/Seibu Lions (1970–1972; 1974–1992); Hanshin Tigers (1995; 1997–1998)

Career highlights and awards
- 3× Japan Series champion (1956, 1957, 1958)

Hiromi Wada (和田 博実, Wada Hiromi; March 26, 1937 – June 22, 2009) was a Japanese professional baseball catcher. He spent most of his career with the Nishitetsu Lions of Nippon Professional Baseball, and died of pancreatic cancer in Fukuoka in 2009.
