= 1963 Japan Series =

Team (Wins)	Managers	Season
Yomiuri Giants (4)	Tetsuharu Kawakami	83–55–2 (.601), 2½ GA
Nishitetsu Lions (3)	Futoshi Nakanishi	86–60–4 (.589), 1 GA
- Dates: October 26 – November 4
- MVP: Shigeo Nagashima (Yomiuri)
- FSA: Kazuhisa Inao (Nishitetsu)

The 1963 Japan Series was the Nippon Professional Baseball (NPB) championship series for the 1963 season. The 14th edition of the Series, it was a best-of-seven playoff that matched the Pacific League champion Nishitetsu Lions against the Central League champion Yomiuri Giants.

== Summary ==
CL Yomiuri Giants (4) vs. PL Nishitetsu Lions (3)

Game	Date	Score	Location	Time	Attendance
1	October 26	Yomiuri Giants – 1, Nishitetsu Lions – 6	Heiwadai Stadium	2:29	29,806
2	October 27	Yomiuri Giants – 9, Nishitetsu Lions – 6	Heiwadai Stadium	2:54	29,969
3	October 30	Nishitetsu Lions – 2, Yomiuri Giants – 8	Korakuen Stadium	2:28	30,384
4	October 31	Nishitetsu Lions – 4, Yomiuri Giants – 1	Korakuen Stadium	2:42	29,960
5	November 1	Nishitetsu Lions – 1, Yomiuri Giants – 3	Korakuen Stadium	2:10	30,386
6	November 3	Yomiuri Giants – 0, Nishitetsu Lions – 6	Heiwadai Stadium	2:09	27,079
7	November 4	Yomiuri Giants – 18, Nishitetsu Lions – 4	Heiwadai Stadium	2:32	17,436

== Matchups ==
=== Game 1 ===
Saturday, October 26, 1963 – 1:00 pm at Heiwadai Stadium in Fukuoka

Team	1	2	3	4	5	6	7	8	9	R	H	E
Yomiuri	0	0	0	0	0	0	0	0	1	1	6	0
Nishitetsu	0	4	0	0	1	0	0	1	X	6	7	0
WP: Kazuhisa Inao (1–0) LP: Yoshiaki Itō (0–1); Home runs: YOM: Masayuki Yamazaki (1); NIS: Hiromi Wada (1), George Wilson (1)

=== Game 2 ===
Sunday, October 27, 1963 – 1:00 pm at Heiwadai Stadium in Fukuoka

Team	1	2	3	4	5	6	7	8	9	R	H	E
Yomiuri	1	3	0	4	0	1	0	0	0	9	8	2
Nishitetsu	1	1	0	0	1	0	1	0	2	6	10	5
WP: Motoshi Fujita (1–0) LP: Kazuhara Abe (0–1); Home runs: YOM: Sadaharu Oh (1); NIS: George Wilson (2)

=== Game 3 ===
Wednesday, October 30, 1963 – 1:00 pm at Korakuen Stadium in Bunkyō, Tokyo

Team	1	2	3	4	5	6	7	8	9	R	H	E
Nishitetsu	0	0	0	0	2	0	0	0	0	2	6	1
Yomiuri	0	0	0	2	5	0	0	1	X	8	10	0
WP: Yoshiaki Itō (1–1) LP: Kazuhisa Inao (1–1); Home runs: NIS: None; YOM: Shigeo Nagashima (1)

=== Game 4 ===
Thursday, October 31, 1963 – 1:00 pm at Korakuen Stadium in Bunkyō, Tokyo

Team	1	2	3	4	5	6	7	8	9	R	H	E
Nishitetsu	0	0	0	1	0	1	1	1	0	4	11	0
Yomiuri	0	0	1	0	0	0	0	0	0	1	7	2
WP: Kazuhara Abe (1–1) LP: Yukinori Miyata (0–1); Home runs: NIS: Kusuo Tanaka (1); YOM: None

=== Game 5 ===
Friday, November 1, 1963 – 1:00 pm at Korakuen Stadium in Bunkyō, Tokyo

Team	1	2	3	4	5	6	7	8	9	R
Nishitetsu	0	0	0	0	0	1	0	0	0	1
Yomiuri	0	1	0	1	0	1	0	0	X	3
WP: Akira Takahashi (1–0) LP: Yoshio Inoue (0–1); Home runs: NIS: Jim Baumer (1); YOM: Shigeo Nagashima 2 (3), Sadaharu Oh (2)

=== Game 6 ===
Sunday, November 3, 1963 – 12:59 pm at Heiwadai Stadium in Fukuoka, Fukuoka Prefecture

Team	1	2	3	4	5	6	7	8	9	R	H	E
Yomiuri	0	0	0	0	0	0	0	0	0	0	2	0
Nishitetsu	2	0	1	0	2	0	0	1	X	6	11	0
WP: Kazuhisa Inao (2–1) LP: Yoshiaki Itō (1–2); Home runs: YOM: None; NIS: Jim Baumer (2)

=== Game 7 ===
Monday, November 4, 1963 – 12:59 pm at Heiwadai Stadium in Fukuoka, Fukuoka Prefecture

Team	1	2	3	4	5	6	7	8	9	R	H	E
Yomiuri	1	0	3	9	0	5	0	0	0	18	19	1
Nishitetsu	1	0	1	0	0	2	0	0	0	4	9	1
WP: Akira Takahashi (2–0) LP: Kazuhisa Inao (2–2); Home runs: YOM: Toshio Yanagida (1), Isao Shibata (1), Sadaharu Oh 2 (4), Yoshiyuki Ikezawa, (1); NIS: Koshiro Ito (1)

== See also ==
- 1963 World Series
