= Toshio Yanagida (baseball) =

- Infielder/Outfielder
- Born: August 18, 1936; Fukushima Prefecture
- Batted: Right Threw: Right

NPB debut
- 1959, for the Daimai Orions

Last appearance
- 1970, for the Nankai Hawks

NPB statistics
- Batting average: .234
- Runs batted in: 287
- Home runs: 68
- Stats at Baseball Reference

Teams
- Daimai Orions (1958–1962); Yomiuri Giants (1963–1967); Nankai Hawks (1967–1970)

Career highlights and awards
- 3x Japan Series champion (1963, 1965, 1966)

Toshio Yanagida (柳田利夫, Yanagida Toshio; born August 18, 1936) is a retired Japanese baseball player.

He debuted with the Daimai Orions in 1958, playing for the team until he was traded to the Yomiuri Giants at the end of the 1962 season. The Giants traded Yanagida to the Nankai Hawks in the middle of the 1967 season, where he played until retiring in 1970. Yanagida appeared in several Japan Series.
