= Heiwadai Stadium =

Former baseball park in Fukuoka, Fukuoka Prefecture, Japan

- 平和台野球場
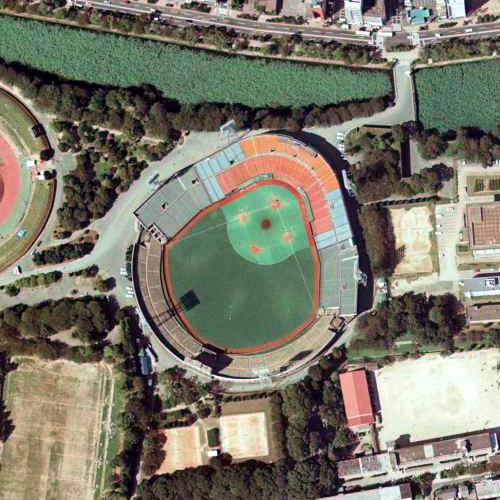
- Heiwadai Stadium in 1987
- Interactive map of Heiwadai Stadium
- Full name: Heiwadai Baseball Stadium
- Address: 1-2 Jonai, Chūō-ku
- Location: Fukuoka, Fukuoka Prefecture, Japan
- Coordinates: 33°35′13″N 130°23′09″E
- Owner: Fukuoka City
- Capacity: 24,000 (1950–1957); 34,000 (1958–1997)
- Surface: Natural grass (1950–1979); Artificial turf (1979–1997)
- Field size: Left/right field – 92 m (302 ft); Left/right-center – 110 m (361 ft); Center field – 122 m (400 ft); Backstop – 20 m (66 ft)

Construction
- Groundbreaking: July 1, 1949
- Opened: December 18, 1949
- Renovated: 1954, 1957–1958, 1987
- Closed: November 24, 1997
- Demolished: 1998
- Cost: ¥30 million ¥157.71 million (1957–1958 renovation)
- Architect: Nikken Sekkei Komu (1957–1958 renovation)

Tenants
- Nishi Nippon Pirates (NPB) (1950); Nishitetsu Clippers/Nishitetsu Lions/Taiheiyo Club Lions/Crown Lighter Lions (NPB) (1950–1978); Fukuoka Daiei Hawks (NPB) (1989–1992)

Heiwadai Baseball Stadium (平和台野球場, Heiwadai Yakyūjō) was a ballpark located in the Fukuoka, Fukuoka Prefecture, Japan. From 1950 to 1978, it served as the home ballpark of the Nishitetsu Lions, a team in Nippon Professional Baseball's (NPB) Pacific League. It also briefly served as the home stadium for NPB teams the Nishi Nippon Pirates in 1950 and the Fukuoka Daiei Hawks from 1989 to 1992. The stadium hosted 1,904 official NPB games in its almost 58-year history.

The stadium was built in 1949 in Maizuru Park, the former site of Fukuoka Castle, by converting a soccer field at Heiwadai Athletic Stadium into a ballpark. For NPB's inaugural season, the Central League's newly created Nishi Nippon Pirates used Heiwadai Stadium as its home. Additionally, the PL's newly created Nishitetsu Clippers used it as a semi-home. After Nishi Nippon's first and only season, the team merged with the Clippers to form the Nishitetsu Lions who made Heiwadai their full-time home starting in the 1951 season. When it was built, the stadium's stands consisted of only wood benches placed atop a dirt mound. It also lacked any lighting equipment to accommodate night games. In 1952, a fan riot ensued at Heiwadai after the Mainichi Orions deliberately delayed a game they were losing to force a game cancellation due to darkness. Lighting equipment was subsequently added in 1954. After the Lions began winning Japan Series championships two seasons later, Nishitetsu dramatically modernized the stadium in 1958 by completely renovating the seating areas, increasing its capacity from 24,000 to 34,000, and adding locker rooms.

The Lions performed poorly in the early 1970s and low attendance at Heiwadai Stadium led to the Lions being sold. The new owner, unable to increase attendance, sold the Lions again in 1978 to owners that moved the team to Saitama Prefecture. With no team using Heiwadai as their dedicated home field, artificial turf was installed in early 1979 and the stadium began hosting 28 countryside NPB games for various teams on average annually starting that same year. At the end of 1988, Daiei acquired the Nankai Hawks and moved them to Fukuoka where they called Heiwadai home through 1992 when they moved into the newly constructed Fukuoka Dome. During renovations in 1987, the remains of an ancient facility were discovered under the bleachers at Heiwadai. The stadium was closed permanently on November 24, 1997, and the park and the infield stands were dismantled the following year. The outfield bleachers were left standing as archeological work on the ruins continued nearby until they were demolished in 2008 due to safety concerns.

== History ==
After World War II, the former site of Fukuoka Castle and later the 24th Infantry Regiment of the 12th Division of the Imperial Japanese Army was requisitioned by the Supreme Commander for the Allied Powers (SCAP) to construct dormitories. Heita Okabe, the chairman of National Sports Festival preparation committee, however, negotiated with SCAP to abandon the plan and instead allow a sports ground to be built on the site. In 1948, Maizuru Park was established and Heiwadai Athletic Stadium was developed in the park to host the 3rd National Sports Festival that same year from October 29 to November 3. The name heiwadai (平和台, 'peace hill') was chosen to commemorate the site's transformation into a place of peace. In March 1949, the city council passed a proposal to build a ballpark in Heiwadai. A soccer field would be redeveloped and construction of the stadium started on July 1. The stadium was simple and its stands consisting of only wood benches placed atop a dirt mound. It cost ¥30 million to construct. Later that same year, on December 18, the stadium hosted its first event, an exhibition game between the Yomiuri Giants and the Osaka Tigers.

The year of the stadium's construction, the Japanese Baseball League reorganized into a two-league system. The single league was split into the Central League (CL) and the Pacific League (PL), creating Nippon Professional Baseball (NPB). For NPB's inaugural season, the CL's newly created Nishi Nippon Pirates used Heiwadai Stadium as its home. Additionally, the PL's newly created Nishitetsu Clippers used it as a semi-home in conjunction with Kasugabaru Stadium in Kasuga, Fukuoka. The stadium's first official professional baseball game was one of the Central League's three inaugural games on March 10, 1950, between the Pirates and the Hiroshima Carp. A ceremony celebrating the completion of Heiwadai Stadium was held on April 16, 1950, and was attended by Fukuoka Mayor Yaroku Miyoshi and the Governor of Fukuoka Katsuji Sugimoto. After Nishi Nippon's first and only season, the team merged with the Clippers to form the Nishitetsu Lions who made Heiwadai their full-time home starting in the 1951 season. In 1952, the franchise system was established, granting the Lions the exclusive rights to professional baseball-events in Fukuoka Prefecture and cementing Heiwadai Stadium as their dedicated home stadium.

=== Lions Era ===
==== The "Heiwadai Incident" and night baseball ====
When Heiwadai Stadium was first constructed, it lacked lighting equipment to accommodate night games, therefore games had to be completed before sunset. A game was called off if it was not finished by sundown and if five innings were completed, it would be considered an official game and count toward the standings. However, if five innings were completed, the game would be cancelled and would not be an official game. On July 16, 1952, the Mainichi Orions were scheduled to play Nishitetsu at Heiwadai at 3:00 pm, however it had been raining in Fukuoka since the morning. With fans already at the stadium, the decision was made to postpone the game instead of cancelling it.

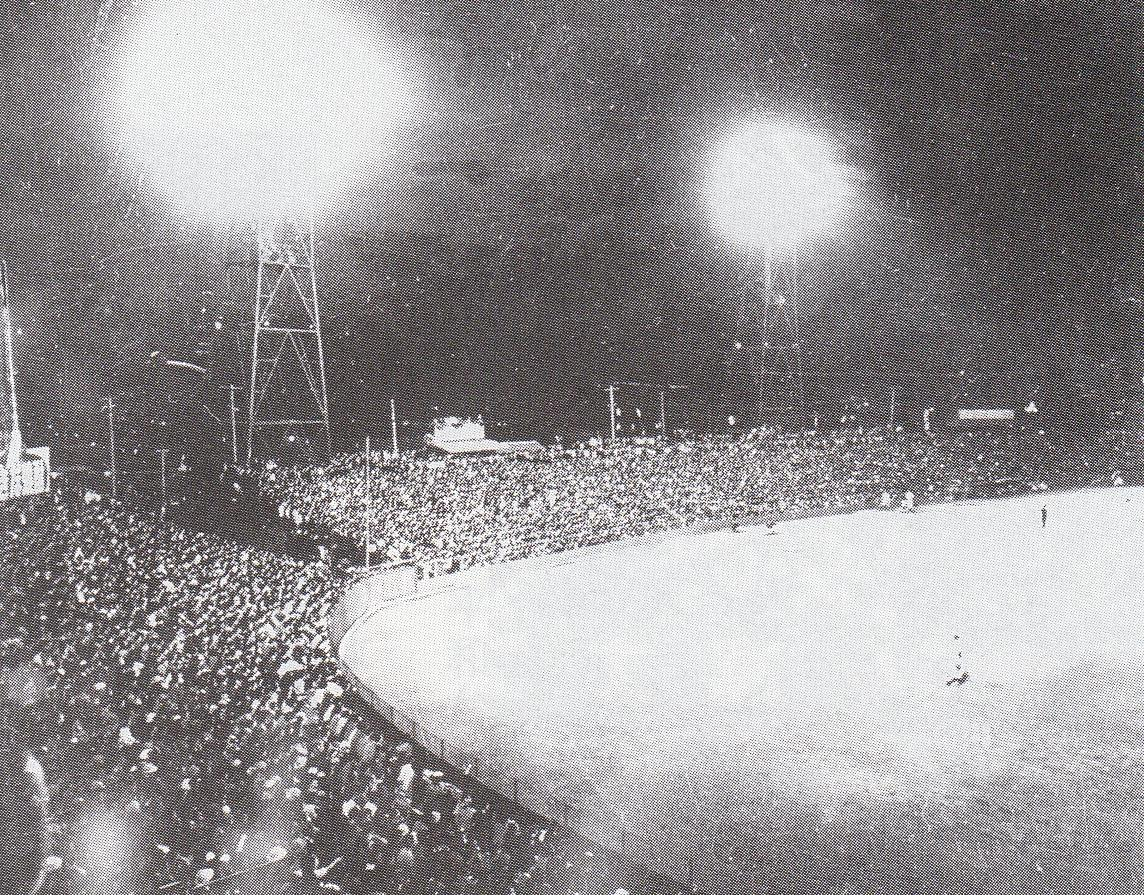
The first night game at Heiwadai Stadium, June 2, 1954.

The game finally started at 4:55 pm, almost two hours after its scheduled start time. With the 7:29 pm sunset just over two and a half hours away, it would have been feasible to complete a full game, however, the rain continued. A 15-minute, first-inning interruption followed by a one-hour delay after the third inning put the game even more behind. The umpire persuaded the reluctant Orions to resume the game in an attempt to fit five innings in before sundown and an announcement was made in the stadium that the game may have to be called at sunset. At 18:46 pm, with the Lions leading 5–4 in the bottom of the fourth inning, Mainichi began to overtly stall in an attempt to force a "no-game". Orion players repeatedly called time outs and went to the bench to drink water. The Lions scored four more runs in the fourth inning and before the top of fifth, with the Orions trailing 4–9, Mainichi manager Yoshio Yuasa insisted that he could not continue.

When the umpire agreed and called the game after the fourth inning, fans stormed the field and attacked the umpire and the Orions. Nishitetsu players such as Noguchi Masaaki and Hiroshi Oshita helped to defend Kaoru Betto and the other Orion players against the assault. Yuasa attempted to defuse the situation by apologizing over the PA system. Eventually, the team managed to get out of the stadium with the help of a police escort. In addition to police, the U.S. Army in Fukuoka was also mobilized and the chaos wasn't contained until midnight. The event received media attention throughout Japan and thrust Heiwadai Stadium into the national spotlight. In the aftermath, Yuasa was later dismissed as manager on July 27. In response to this incident, Nishitstsu applied for and received approval from Fukuoka to install lights in 1954. Heiwadai Stadium's first night game feature the Lions competing against the Nankai Hawks on June 2, 1954.

==== Japan Series and renovations ====
Renovation comparison

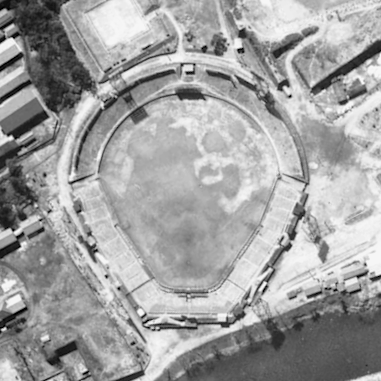
Pre-renovations, 1956

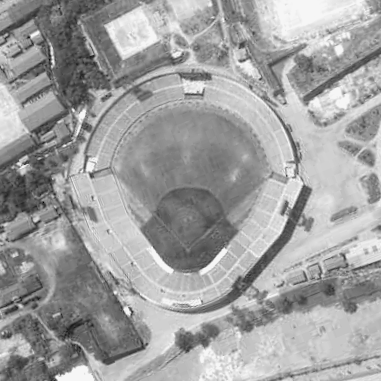
Post-renovations, 1961

Renovations following the 1957 season greatly changed the stadium, specifically its infield and outfield seating.

During a game against the Daiei Stars on August 29, 1953, Lions' infielder Futoshi Nakanishi hit a home run to center field off of Yoshikazu Hayashi that cleared the outfield stands and left the stadium. The home run is estimated to have traveled over 160 m (525 ft) and is still considered to be the farthest by a Japanese player. A ball-shaped commemorative sign was later installed to indicate where the ball left the stadium. Nakanishi helped the Lions win their first Pacific League championship the next season, allowing Heiwadai to host its first Japan Series during the 1953 series. During the team's "Golden Age", Nishitetsu won three straight Japan Series from 1956 to 1958.

For the 1956 Japan Series against the Yomiuri Giants, temporary stands were constructed and infield seating was added to increase the stadium's capacity and help meet fan demand. After winning two consecutive championships, Nishitetsu decided to dramatically renovate and modernize the stadium. Architectural firm Nikken Sekkei Komu was hired to design the renovation. As Heiwadai was managed by the city of Fukuoka, Nishitetsu requested and acquired permission to proceed with the renovations following the conclusion of the 1957 season. Among the changes, the wooden stands were replaced with reinforced concrete, seats were installed in the previously earthen outfield seating area, the stadium's seating capacity was increased from 24,000 to 34,000, the center field scoreboard was replaced, and indoor bullpens, locker rooms, and player bathrooms were built. The modernization project cost ¥157.71 million, paid for by Nishitetsu and donated to Fukuoka, and wasn't completed until April 26, 1958. The Lions opened the 1958 season playing their home games at the newly constructed Kokura Stadium in Kitakyushu since construction wasn't completed before the start of the season. Later that year, on July 27, Heiwadai hosted its first of seven All-Star games.

==== Declining attendance and Lions relocation ====
The 1963 Japan Series was the last held at Heiwadai. In 1969, a game-fixing and gambling conspiracy dubbed the Black Mist Scandal was uncovered and resulted in several key Lions players being suspended or banned from baseball. The loss of these players dramatically weakened Nishitetsu and the team finished in last place for three consecutive seasons from 1970 to 1972; the team would not recover from the scandal for the rest of the 1970s. By the end of 1972, the average attendance at Heiwadai had dropped to 4,900 people per game, or 320,000 annually. In the offseason, Nishitetsu sold the team to former Lotte Orions owner Nagayoshi Nakamura who renamed the team the Taiheiyo Club Lions after securing a sponsorship from golf company Taiheiyo Club.

In the first year under new ownership, the Lions secretly coordinated with the Lotte Orions to intensify their rivalry as a way to boost attendance. The opening game against Lotte in 1973 at Kawasaki Stadium was contentious and disparaging remarks by Lotte manager Masaichi Kaneda provoked Lions fans further. When the two teams next played on June 1 at Heiwadai Stadium, the Lions lost prompting fans to throw bottles of liquor onto the field. The situation continued to escalate after the game. Glass at the stadium's entrance was broken and Lotte was escorted out of the stadium at 11 pm in a Fukuoka Prefectural Police armored bus. The animosity between the two teams continued the following season and again, on May 23, fans stormed the field at Heiwadai and Lotte again left in an armored bus. While the plan to grow the rivalry was a success, it did not lead to an overall increase in attendance. The team was sold once again in 1977, this time to the Crown Lighter company. Following the 1978 season in which the team only drew 780,000 fans to Heiwadai, the team was sold to the Seibu Group and the franchise moved northward to Tokorozawa, Saitama Prefecture.

=== The Hawks, Korokan, and demolition ===
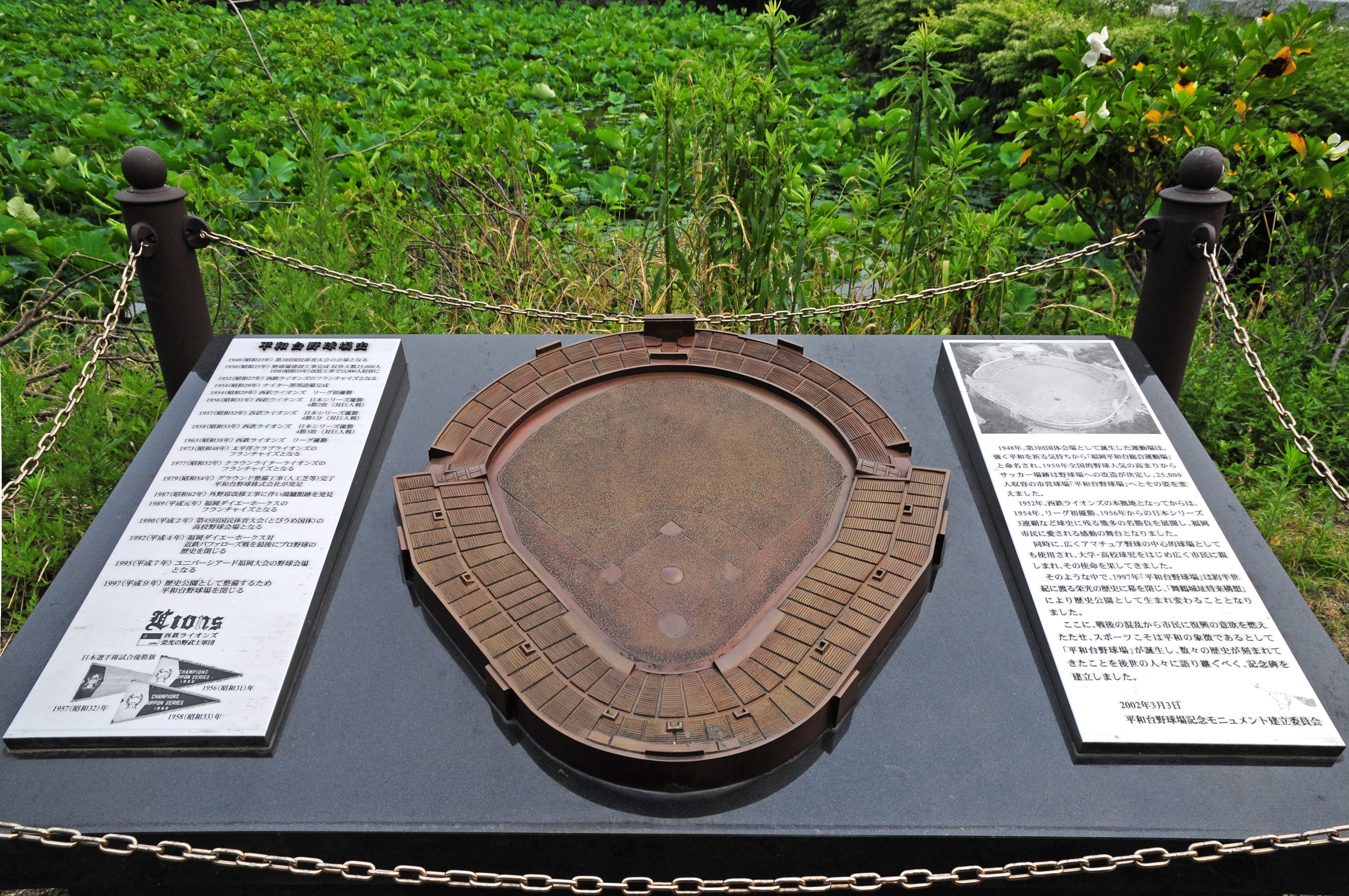
A commemorative plaque was erected at the stadium's former entrance in 2002.

With the Lions gone and no team to use Heiwadai Stadium as their dedicate home field, Heiwadai Baseball Corporation was established to help continue hosting professional baseball games at the stadium. The field was converted to artificial turf in April 1979, and starting that same year, various Central and Pacific League teams held 28 countryside games there on average annually. At the end of 1988, Nankai Electric Railway sold the struggling Hawks to Daiei who then moved the team to Fukuoka. Starting with the 1989 season, the Hawks began using Heiwadai as their home field. However, after the remains of the Korokan, an ancient lodging facility for foreign visitors, were discovered under the bleachers during renovations in December 1987, the city planned to excavate the ruins and redevelop the site into a historical park. With plans to close Heiwadai in the works, Daiei started construction on Japan's second domed stadium (and first with a retractable roof), Fukuoka Dome, about 1.5 km (0.93 mi) away and moved there in 1993. The last official professional baseball game played at Heiwadai Stadium was the Daiei vs. the Kintetsu Buffaloes on October 1, 1992. During the stadium's lifetime, 1,904 official NPB games were played over 42 consecutive seasons.

Heiwadai closed permanently on November 24, 1997, and the park and the infield stands were dismantled the next year. The outfield bleachers were left standing as archeological excavation on the nearby Korokan continued. They were demolished in 2008, however, after the 2005 Fukuoka earthquake damaged them and put them at risk of collapsing. Excavation at the site was completed in 2013 and the stadium's former footprint was eventually developed into a plaza lawn named Korokan Square and opened to the public in 2016. Today, part of the outer outfield walls are the only portion of the stadium that still remain.

In March 2002, the Nishitetsu Lions Alumni Association erected a commemorative plaque was at the stadium's former entrance. Since its demolition, both the Lions and the Hawks have held events celebrating their former home. At the first Lions Classic event in 2008, stone from the stadium's outfield wall was displayed outside of Seibu Dome during a series devoted to Heiwadai against the Hawks. During a similar event in 2014, the Fukuoka Classic, the Hawks modified Yafuoku Dome's scoreboard to resemble the Heiwadai Stadium's scoreboard during the team's time there.

== Design and features ==
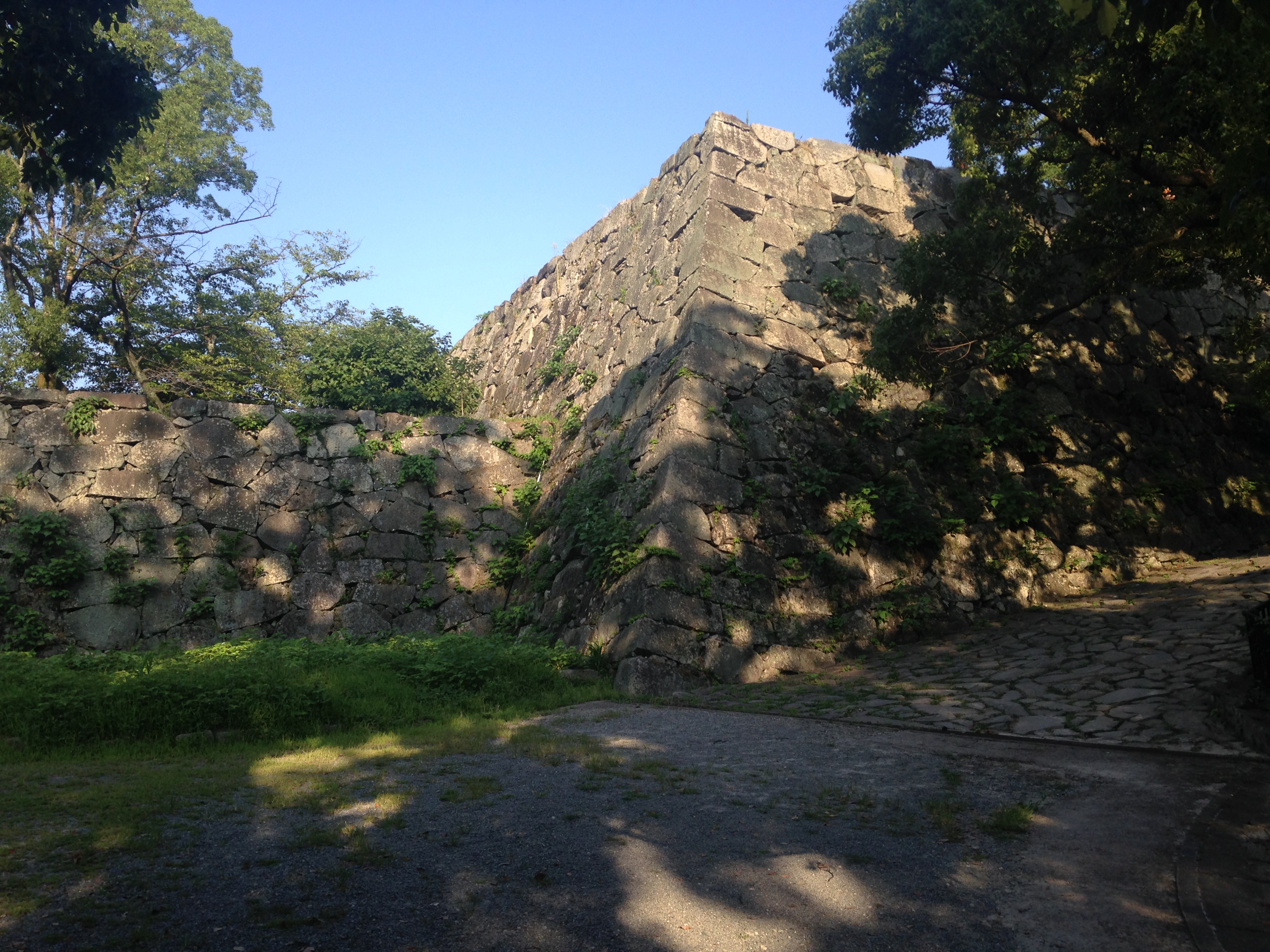
The stadium was built amongst Fukuoka Castle's ruins.

After the Meiji Restoration, Fukuoka Castle was abandoned and its grounds were converted into military facility. When the Japanese military was disbanded following World War II, the ruins of the castle were left as one of the few, large open areas within the city of Fukuoka. The large space was eventually utilized to build Hewaidai Stadium next to the castle's ruins and moat. Spectators were able to climb atop trees and the castle's remaining stone walls to see inside the ballpark.

The stadium's playing field was traditionally Japanese, curved and symmetrical; the distances from home plate to the outfield wall were 92 metres (302 ft) to the foul poles, 110 metres (360 ft) to left- and right-center fields, and 122 metres (400 ft) to the center field wall. Its surface was natural turf until 1979, when it was converted to artificial turf until the stadium's demolition.

An udon soup served at the stadium was extremely popular. During the 2014 Fukuoka Classic, Yafuoku Dome recreated a limited amount of the dish for fans.

Tenants
Preceded by First stadium	Home of the Nishi Nippon Pirates; 1950	Succeeded by Last stadium
Preceded by First stadium	Home of the Nishitetsu Clippers/Nishitetsu Lions/ Taiheiyo Club Lions/Crown Lighter Lions; 1950–1978	Succeeded by Seibu Lions Stadium
Preceded by Osaka Stadium	Home of the Fukuoka Daiei Hawks; 1989–1992	Succeeded by Fukuoka Dome
