= 1957 Japan Series =

Team (Wins)	Managers	Season
Nishitetsu Lions (4)	Osamu Mihara	83–44–5 (.648), 7 GA
Yomiuri Giants (0)	Shigeru Mizuhara	74–53–3 (.581), 1 GA
- Dates: October 26 – November 1
- MVP: Hiroshi Ōshita (Nishitetsu)
- FSA: Andy Miyamoto (Yomiuri)

The 1957 Japan Series was the championship series of Nippon Professional Baseball (NPB) for the 1957 season. The eighth edition of the Series, it was a best-of-seven playoff that matched the Pacific League champion Nishitetsu Lions against the Central League champion Yomiuri Giants. The Lions won the series in five games that saw one game end in a tie and the other four all end with them winning by just one run each.

== Summary ==
PL Nishitetsu Lions (4) vs. CL Yomiuri Giants (0)

Game	Date	Score	Location	Time	Attendance
1	October 26	Yomiuri Giants – 2, Nishitetsu Lions – 3	Heiwadai Stadium	2:38	23,992
2	October 27	Yomiuri Giants – 1, Nishitetsu Lions – 2	Heiwadai Stadium	2:18	24,373
3	October 30	Nishitetsu Lions – 5, Yomiuri Giants – 4	Korakuen Stadium	2:32	30,484
4	October 31	Nishitetsu Lions – 0, Yomiuri Giants – 0	Korakuen Stadium	3:01	27,649
5	November 1	Nishitetsu Lions – 6, Yomiuri Giants – 5	Korakuen Stadium	2:37	30,519

== Matchups ==
=== Game 1 ===
Saturday, October 26, 1957 – 1:02 pm at Heiwadai Stadium in Fukuoka

Team	1	2	3	4	5	6	7	8	9	R	H	E
Yomiuri	1	0	0	0	0	0	1	0	0	2	9	0
Nishitetsu	0	0	0	1	0	1	1	0	X	3	7	0
WP: Kazuhisa Inao (1–0) LP: Takumi Ōtomo (0–1); Home runs: YOM: None; NIS: Yasumitsu Toyoda (1)

=== Game 2 ===
Sunday, October 27, 1957 – 1:02 pm at Heiwadai Stadium in Fukuoka

Team	1	2	3	4	5	6	7	8	9	R	H	E
Yomiuri	0	0	0	0	0	0	0	0	1	1	5	1
Nishitetsu	0	0	0	0	0	0	0	0	2X	2	5	0
WP: Hidefumi Kawamura (1–0) LP: Motoshi Fujita (0–1); Home runs: YOM: Andy Miyamoto (1); NIS: None

=== Game 3 ===
Wednesday, October 30, 1957 – 1:33 pm at Korakuen Stadium in Bunkyō, Tokyo

Team	1	2	3	4	5	6	7	8	9	R	H	E
Nishitetsu	0	0	0	0	0	2	2	1	0	5	6	3
Yomiuri	2	0	0	0	0	0	0	2	0	4	6	1
WP: Kazuhisa Inao (2–0) LP: Taketoshi Yoshihara (0–1); Home runs: NIS: Hiroshi Ōshita (1), Seiji Sekiguchi (1); YOM: Wally Yonamine (1), Andy Miyamoto (2)

=== Game 4 ===
Thursday, October 31, 1957 – 1:36 pm at Korakuen Stadium in Bunkyō, Tokyo

Team	1	2	3	4	5	6	7	8	9	10	R	H	E
Nishitetsu	0	0	0	0	0	0	0	0	0	0	0	6	0
Yomiuri	0	0	0	0	0	0	0	0	0	0	0	6	1

=== Game 5 ===
Friday, November 1, 1957 – 1:32 pm at Korakuen Stadium in Bunkyō, Tokyo

Team	1	2	3	4	5	6	7	8	9	R	H	E
Nishitetsu	1	0	0	0	1	4	0	0	0	6	13	0
Yomiuri	0	0	1	0	2	0	0	2	0	5	8	1
WP: Yukio Shimabara (1–0) LP: Yoshinori Kido (0–1); Home runs: NIS: Hiromi Wada 2 (2); YOM: Keishi Totoki (1), Tetsuharu Kawakami (1)

== See also ==
- 1957 World Series
