= Takao Kajimoto =

Japanese baseball player (1935–2006)

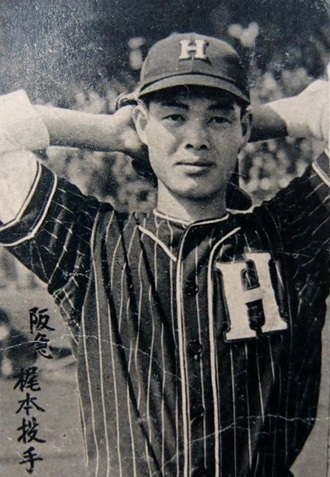
- Kajimoto in 1954
- Pitcher
- Born: April 8, 1935; Kofu, Yamanashi, Japan
- Died: September 23, 2006 (aged 71)
- Batted: Left Threw: Left

NPB debut
- 1954, for the Hankyu Braves

Last NPB appearance
- 1973, for the Hankyu Braves

NPB statistics
- Win–loss: 254–255
- Earned run average: 2.98
- Shutouts: 43
- Innings pitched: 4,208
- Strikeouts: 2,945
- Stats at Baseball Reference

Teams
- As player: Hankyu Braves (1954–1973); As manager: Hankyu Braves (1979–1980); As coach: Hankyu Braves (1974, 1978, 1981–1986); Orix BlueWave (1989–1996); Chunichi Dragons (1998–1999)

Career highlights and awards
- 12x All-Star; 4x 20-game winner; Japan Series MVP (1992)

Member of the Japanese

Baseball Hall of Fame
- Induction: 2007

Takao Kajimoto (梶本 隆夫; April 8, 1935—September 23, 2006) was a left-handed Japanese baseball pitcher for the Hankyu Braves from 1954 to 1973. He won 254 games and was a 12-time All-Star during his career. He is a member of the Japanese Baseball Hall of Fame and Meikyukai.

== Career ==
Kajimoto was signed by the Hankyu Braves in 1954 and surprised people in spring training with his fastball, which reached 150 km/h (93 mph). He was so impressive, he was named the Opening Day starter and won. That year he was 20-12 with a 2.73 ERA as a rookie. Kajimoto led the Pacific League with 118 walks, but made the All-Star team. Hankyu was only 46-58 when other pitchers got the decision.

In 1956, Kajimoto was 28-17 with a 2.24 ERA. He struck out 327 and walked 118 in 364 1/3 innings. He led the league in complete games (20), batters faced (1,478), hits allowed (284), hit batters (12), walks, strikeouts and shutouts (5, tied with Katsumi Nakanishi). He made his second All-Star team and was ninth in the Pacific League in ERA.

1957 presented Kajimoto with a 24-16, 1.92 ERA year in which he whiffed 301 in 337 1/3 IP. An All-Star, he reached 1,000 strikeouts in just his fourth season. On July 23, he became the first pitcher in Japanese professional baseball history to strike out nine consecutive batters. He led in complete games (26) and strikeouts. His seven shutouts tied Shoichi Ono for the most, while he finished fourth in ERA.

On September 14, 1958 Kajimoto threw a one-hitter against the Toei Flyers. In 1963, he fell to 9-17 with a 4.33 ERA, making his 8th All-Star team but posting the worst ERA of his career. That season, the Hankyu offense was so weak (they barely averaged 3 runs a game) that manager Yukio Nishimoto once batted Kajimoto third. Overall, Kajimoto hit .204 in his career, with 13 homers and two intentional walks.

Kajimoto rebounded to 9-13 and a 3.34 ERA in 1964, and became the third NPB pitcher ever to reach 2,000 career strikeouts. In '65, Kajimoto went 5-11 with a 3.61 ERA and made his ninth All-Star squad. He began 1966 2-0 – and went downhill from there, losing a Nippon Pro Baseball record 15 consecutive decisions to finish the year at 2-15 with a 3.68 ERA. Hankyu was 55-58 when other pitchers got the decision.

In '67, Kajimoto dropped his 16th in a row but went 15-8 afterwards and had a 2.44 ERA in a fine resurgent year. He was an All-Star for the 10th time and reached 200 career victories. At age 32, he was 7th in the league in ERA. Making it to the Japan Series for the first time, he was toasted, going 0-2 with a 6.43 ERA and losing games three and six when Hankyu split the other four.

Kajimoto had a 12-8, 2.97 ERA year for the 1968 Braves as they won another pennant. He had a 6.35 ERA in the 1968 Japan Series as Hankyu again fell to the Sadaharu Oh-Shigeo Nagashima Yomiuri Giants dynasty, but Kajimoto did win his only decision in that Series. He also was an All-Star pick that year.

The 34-year-old left-hander won his most games since age 25 in 1969 when he had an 18-10, 2.97 record. Kajimoto led the league with five wild pitches but made his 12th and last All-Star team. He was 0-1 with a 10.12 ERA in the 1969 Japan Series as Hankyu again fell to Yomiuri.

The '71 season saw Kajimoto post a 6-8 record and a 3.44 ERA. He pitched one scoreless inning in another loss to the Oh-Nagashima attack in the 1971 Japan Series.

For 1972, the veteran was 2-5 with a 3.65 ERA. In a game against Toei, he was called for a ball on the 20 second rule, the only known instance both before and after that anyone has ever been penalized with it.

Kajimoto went 3-0 and a 6.30 ERA the next year to finish his pitching career at 254-255 and a 2.98 ERA, with 2,945 K in 4,208 IP. Through 2005, Kajimoto was 9th all-time in NPB in wins, 3rd in losses, 14th in complete games (202), tied at 14th with Kazuhisa Inao in shutouts (43), tied for 22nd in walk-less complete games (25), third in games pitched (867), 6th in innings (4,208), 6th in strikeouts, 6th in hits allowed (3,849) and 13th in homers allowed (321).

== After retirement ==
Kajimoto worked as a coach for Hankyu in 1974 and 1978, when he is credited with helping Yutaro Imai develop by having him drink before pitching. (Kajimoto also had been known as a drinker.) He became the Braves manager in '79 and they went 75-44-11, posting the best record. That year, the Pacific League experimented with playoffs and Hankyu lost to the second-half champion Kintetsu Buffaloes. In 1980, the Braves fell to 5th (58-67-5) and Kajimoto was replaced at the helm by his predecessor, Toshiharu Ueda. Kajimoto became a coach again and worked as such from 1981 to 86.

When the Hankyu team became the Orix BlueWave in 1989, Kajimoto returned and coached for seven more years. At age 60, he could still throw 140 km/h (87 mph).

In 1998, Kajimoto became a coach with the Chunichi Dragons minor league system for two years. He then worked as a commentator for Daily Sports.

== Death ==
Kajimoto died in 2006 of respiratory arrest.

== See also ==
- List of top Nippon Professional Baseball strikeout pitchers
