= 1965 Japan Series =

Team (Wins)	Managers	Season
Yomiuri Giants (4)	Tetsuharu Kawakami	91–47–2 (.659), 13 GA
Nankai Hawks (1)	Kazuto Tsuruoka	88–49–3 (.642), 12 GA
- Dates: October 30 – November 5
- MVP: Shigeo Nagashima (Yomiuri)
- FSA: Nobuyasu Morishita (Nankai)

The 1965 Japan Series was the championship series of Nippon Professional Baseball (NPB) for the 1965 season. The 16th edition of the Series, it was a best-of-seven playoff that matched the Pacific League champion Nankai Hawks against the Central League champion Yomiuri Giants. It was the first of nine consecutive Japan Series championships won by the Giants, a record that still stands.

== Summary ==
CL Yomiuri Giants (4) vs. PL Nankai Hawks (1)

Game	Date	Score	Location	Time	Attendance
1	October 30	Yomiuri Giants – 4, Nankai Hawks – 2	Osaka Stadium	2:30	30,094
2	October 31	Yomiuri Giants – 6, Nankai Hawks – 4	Osaka Stadium	3:06	30,139
3	November 3	Nankai Hawks – 3, Yomiuri Giants – 9	Korakuen Stadium	2:32	32,151
4	November 4	Nankai Hawks – 4, Yomiuri Giants – 2	Korakuen Stadium	2:27	31,089
5	November 5	Nankai Hawks – 2, Yomiuri Giants – 3	Korakuen Stadium	2:22	26,803

== Matchups ==
=== Game 1 ===
Saturday, October 30, 1965, 1:00 pm (JST) at Osaka Stadium in Osaka, Osaka Prefecture
Team	1	2	3	4	5	6	7	8	9	R	H	E
Yomiuri	1	0	0	0	2	1	0	0	0	4	8	1
Nankai	0	0	0	0	0	0	2	0	0	2	7	0
WP: Masaichi Kaneda (1–0) LP: Tadashi Sugiura (0–1); Home runs: YOM: Sadaharu Oh 2 (2), Isao Shibata (1); NAN: None

=== Game 2 ===
Sunday, October 31, 1965, 1:00 pm (JST) at Osaka Stadium in Osaka, Osaka Prefecture
Team	1	2	3	4	5	6	7	8	9	10	R	H	E
Yomiuri	0	0	0	0	0	0	4	0	0	2	6	6	0
Nankai	2	0	0	0	2	0	0	0	0	0	4	6	1
WP: Miyata (1–0) LP: Miura (0–1); Home runs: YOM: Shigeo Nagashima (1); NAN: None

Shigeo Nagashima delivered a home run in the tenth inning to give the Giants the go-ahead lead in a game where they rallied from a 4–0 deficit in the seventh inning.

=== Game 3 ===
Wednesday, November 3, 1965, 1:00 pm (JST) at Korakuen Stadium in Tokyo, Japan
Team	1	2	3	4	5	6	7	8	9	R	H	E
Nankai	0	0	0	0	0	0	3	0	0	3	6	3
Yomiuri	2	0	0	0	0	0	5	2	X	9	8	1
WP: Kaneda (2–0) LP: Stanka (0–1); Home runs: NAN: None; Home: Nagashima (2), Wang (1)

Game 3 was delayed a day due to rain.

=== Game 4 ===
Thursday, November 4, 1965, 12:58 pm (JST) at Korakuen Stadium in Tokyo, Japan
Team	1	2	3	4	5	6	7	8	9	R	H	E
Nankai	0	0	0	0	0	4	0	0	0	4	9	1
Yomiuri	2	0	0	0	0	0	5	0	2	2	6	0
WP: Hayashi (1–0) LP: Minoru Nakamura (0–1)

=== Game 5 ===
Friday, November 5, 1965, 12:59 pm (JST) at Korakuen Stadium in Tokyo, Japan
Team	1	2	3	4	5	6	7	8	9	R	H	E
Nankai	2	0	0	0	0	0	0	0	0	2	7	2
Yomiuri	0	0	0	0	0	2	0	0	1X	3	6	0
WP: Miyata (2–0) LP: Sugiura (0–2); Home runs: NAN: Nomura (1); Home: None

== See also ==
- 1965 World Series
