= Yosuke Terada =

Japanese footballer

Personal information
- Date of birth: 8 July 1987 (age 39)
- Place of birth: Kanagawa, Japan
- Height: 1.76 m (5 ft 9 in)
- Position: Defender

Team information
- Current team: SC Sagamihara
- Number: 22

Youth career
- 2006–2009: Nippon Sport Science University

Senior career*
Years	Team	Apps	(Gls)
2010	YSCC Yokohama	14	(7)
2011–2012	Nagano Parceiro	45	(5)
2013	FC Ryūkyū	20	(1)
2014–	SC Sagamihara	28	(0)
- * Club domestic league appearances and goals as of 23 February 2016

Yosuke Terada (寺田洋介, Terada, Yosuke; born 16 October 1987 in Kanagawa) is a Japanese footballer who plays for SC Sagamihara.

== Club statistics ==
Updated to 23 February 2016.

Club performance			League		Cup		Total	
Season	Club	League	Apps	Goals	Apps	Goals	Apps	Goals
Japan			League		Emperor's Cup		Total	
2010	YSCC Yokohama	JRL (Kanto, Div. 1)	14	7	1	0	15	7
2011	Nagano Parceiro	JFL	19	1	–		19	1
2012	Nagano Parceiro	JFL	26	4	3	0	29	4
2013	FC Ryūkyū	JFL	20	1	2	0	22	1
2014	SC Sagamihara	J3 League	11	0	–		11	0
2015	SC Sagamihara	J3 League	17	0	–		17	0
Career total			107	13	6	0	113	13
