= Osamu Mihara =

Japanese baseball player and manager

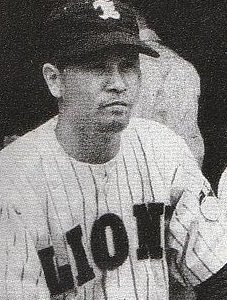
- Mihara in 1951
- Infielder / Manager
- Born: November 21, 1911; Nakatado District, Kagawa, Japan
- Died: February 26, 1984 (aged 72)
- Batted: Right Threw: Right

NPB debut
- September 18, 1936, for the Yomiuri Giants

Last NPB appearance
- November 15, 1938, for the Yomiuri Giants

NPB statistics (through 1938)
- Batting average: .226
- Home runs: 0
- Hits: 92
- Managerial record: 1,687–1,453–108
- Stats at Baseball Reference

Teams
- As player: The Great Japan Tokyo Baseball Club/Tokyo Kyojin (1934–1938); As manager: Yomiuri Giants (1947–1949); Nishitetsu Lions (1951–1959); Taiyo Whales (1960–1967); Kintetsu Buffaloes (1968–1970); Yakult Atoms (1971–1973)

Career highlights and awards
- JBL pennant (1949); 4x Japan Series champion (1956, 1957, 1958, 1960)

Member of the Japanese

Baseball Hall of Fame
- Induction: 1983

Osamu Mihara (三原 脩, Mihara Osamu; November 21, 1911 – February 6, 1984) was a professional Japanese baseball player and manager. Mihara played for a few years for The Great Japan Tokyo Baseball Club/Tokyo Kyojin. After serving as a private in the Japanese Army during World War II, he became a manager of the Giants from 1947 to 1949. He became manager of the Nishitetsu Lions in 1951. He led them to their first league pennant in 1954, where they lost in the Japan Series to the Chunichi Dragons. They returned to the Series in 1956 in what became the first of three consecutive league pennants, all of which resulted in victories in the Japan Series. He departed the team after the 1959 season to coach the Taiyō Whales. In his first season with the team, he led them to their first ever Japan Series by winning the Central League pennant, making him the first manager to win multiple league pennants. In the Japan Series, they prevailed in a four-game sweep over the Daimai Orions to win their first championship. It was the last of four Japan Series titles for Mihara. While he managed the team for seven more years, the Whales never returned to the Japan Series. He concluded his managerial career with brief stints for the Kintetsu Buffaloes and the Yakult Atoms before his career ended in 1973. Mihara was well known for his penchant for playing percentage baseball to his own type of logic that often was called "Mihara magic", which most notably could see him take a player who was 3-for-3 out of the game because he figured the odds were that the hitter would not get another hit. Often called one of the best Japanese managers of all time, he was inducted into the Japanese Baseball Hall of Fame in 1983.
