= 1958 Japan Series =

Team (Wins)	Managers	Season
Nishitetsu Lions (4)	Osamu Mihara	78–47–5 (.619), 1 GA
Yomiuri Giants (3)	Shigeru Mizuhara	77–52–1 (.596), 5½ GA
- Dates: October 11–21
- MVP: Kazuhisa Inao (Nishitetsu)
- FSA: Motoshi Fujita (Yomiuri)

The 1958 Japan Series was the championship series of Nippon Professional Baseball (NPB) for the 1958 season. The ninth edition of the Series, it was a best-of-seven playoff that matched the Pacific League champion Nishitetsu Lions against the Central League champion Yomiuri Giants. The Lions won the series in seven games in a dramatic comeback that saw them lose the first three games before winning the next four, which included a walk off hit in Game 5 after trailing by a run in the 9th inning. They became the first NPB team to overcome a 3–0 series deficit. It was the first and only time a team recovered from a 3–0 series deficit until the 1986 Japan Series.

== Summary ==
PL Nishitetsu Lions (4) vs. CL Yomiuri Giants (3)

Game	Date	Score	Location	Time	Attendance
1	October 11	Nishitetsu Lions – 2, Yomiuri Giants – 9	Korakuen Stadium	3:02	35,217
2	October 12	Nishitetsu Lions – 3, Yomiuri Giants – 7	Korakuen Stadium	2:21	35,953
3	October 14	Yomiuri Giants – 1, Nishitetsu Lions – 0	Heiwadai Stadium	2:00	31,575
4	October 16	Yomiuri Giants – 4, Nishitetsu Lions – 6	Heiwadai Stadium	2:17	27,044
5	October 17	Yomiuri Giants – 3, Nishitetsu Lions – 5	Heiwadai Stadium	2:34	25,193
6	October 20	Nishitetsu Lions – 2, Yomiuri Giants – 0	Korakuen Stadium	2:03	31,745
7	October 21	Nishitetsu Lions – 6, Yomiuri Giants – 1	Korakuen Stadium	2:23	20,961

== Matchups ==
=== Game 1 ===
Saturday, October 11, 1958 – 1:35 pm at Korakuen Stadium in Bunkyō, Tokyo

Team	1	2	3	4	5	6	7	8	9	R	H	E
Nishitetsu	0	0	0	0	1	0	0	0	1	2	6	1
Yomiuri	1	0	1	1	0	0	6	0	X	9	16	0
WP: Takumi Ōtomo (1–0) LP: Kazuhisa Inao (0–1); Home runs: NIS: Yasumitsu Toyoda (1); YOM: Tatsuro Hirooka (1), Shigeo Nagashima (1)

=== Game 2 ===
Sunday, October 12, 1958 – 1:30 pm at Korakuen Stadium in Bunkyō, Tokyo

Team	1	2	3	4	5	6	7	8	9	R	H	E
Nishitetsu	0	0	1	0	0	0	0	2	0	3	5	0
Yomiuri	7	0	0	0	0	0	0	0	X	7	7	1
WP: Shō Horiuchi (1–0) LP: Yukio Shimabara (0–1); Home runs: NIS: Yasumitsu Toyoda (2); YOM: None

=== Game 3 ===
Tuesday, October 14, 1958 – 2:02 pm at Heiwadai Stadium in Fukuoka, Fukuoka Prefecture

Team	1	2	3	4	5	6	7	8	9	R	H	E
Yomiuri	0	0	1	0	0	0	0	0	0	1	3	0
Nishitetsu	0	0	0	0	0	0	0	0	0	0	4	0
WP: Motoshi Fujita (1–0) LP: Kazuhisa Inao (0–2)

=== Game 4 ===
Thursday, October 16, 1958 – 2:01 pm at Heiwadai Stadium in Fukuoka, Fukuoka Prefecture

Team	1	2	3	4	5	6	7	8	9	R	H	E
Yomiuri	2	1	0	0	0	0	1	0	0	4	10	0
Nishitetsu	0	3	0	0	1	1	1	0	X	6	8	1
WP: Kazuhisa Inao (1–2) LP: Motoshi Fujita (1–1); Home runs: YOM: Tatsuro Hirooka (2); NIS: Yasumitsu Toyoda 2 (4)

=== Game 5 ===
Friday, October 17, 1958 – 2:05 pm at Heiwadai Stadium in Fukuoka, Fukuoka Prefecture

Team	1	2	3	4	5	6	7	8	9	10	R	H	E
Yomiuri	3	0	0	0	0	0	0	0	0	0	3	5	0
Nishitetsu	0	0	0	0	0	0	2	0	1	1	4	6	0
WP: Kazuhisa Inao (2–2) LP: Takumi Ōtomo (1–1); Home runs: YOM: Wally Yonamine (1); NIS: Futoshi Nakanishi (1), Kazuhisa Inao (1)

=== Game 6 ===
Monday, October 20, 1958 – 2:10 pm at Korakuen Stadium in Bunkyō, Tokyo

Team	1	2	3	4	5	6	7	8	9	R	H	E
Nishitetsu	2	0	0	0	0	0	0	0	0	2	5	2
Yomiuri	0	0	0	0	0	0	0	0	0	0	3	2
WP: Kazuhisa Inao (3–2) LP: Motoshi Fujita (1–2); Home runs: NIS: Futoshi Nakanishi (2); YOM: None

=== Game 7 ===
Tuesday, October 21, 1958 – 1:33 pm at Korakuen Stadium in Bunkyō, Tokyo

Team	1	2	3	4	5	6	7	8	9	R	H	E
Nishitetsu	3	0	0	0	2	0	0	1	0	6	11	1
Yomiuri	0	0	0	0	0	0	0	0	1	1	6	3
WP: Kazuhisa Inao (4–2) LP: Shō Horiuchi (1–1); Home runs: NIS: Futoshi Nakanishi (3); YOM: Shigeo Nagashima (2)

== See also ==
- 1958 World Series
