= 1956 Japan Series =

Team (Wins)	Managers	Season
Nishitetsu Lions (4)	Osamu Mihara	96–51–7 (.646), GA: ½
Yomiuri Giants (2)	Shigeru Mizuhara	82–44–4 (.646), GA: 4½
- Dates: October 10–17
- MVP: Yasumitsu Toyoda (Nishitetsu)
- FSA: Kazuhisa Inao (Nishitetsu)

The 1956 Japan Series was the championship series of Nippon Professional Baseball (NPB) for the 1956 season. The seventh edition of the Series, it was a best-of-seven playoff that matched the Pacific League champion Nishitetsu Lions against the Central League champion Yomiuri Giants. This is the first (and so far only) Series to feature the same team win the MVP Award and Fighting Spirit Award.

== Summary ==
PL Nishitetsu Lions (4) vs. CL Yomiuri Giants (2)

Game	Date	Score	Location	Time	Attendance
1	October 10	Nishitetsu Lions – 0, Yomiuri Giants – 4	Korakuen Stadium	2:07	24,632
2	October 11	Nishitetsu Lions – 6, Yomiuri Giants – 3	Korakuen Stadium	2:18	19,108
3	October 13	Yomiuri Giants – 4, Nishitetsu Lions – 5	Heiwadai Stadium	2:41	23,528
4	October 14	Yomiuri Giants – 0, Nishitetsu Lions – 4	Heiwadai Stadium	1:55	24,459
5	October 15	Yomiuri Giants – 12, Nishitetsu Lions – 7	Heiwadai Stadium	3:16	19,042
6	October 17	Nishitetsu Lions – 5, Yomiuri Giants – 1	Korakuen Stadium	2:13	27,994

== Matchups ==
=== Game 1 ===
Wednesday, October 10, 1956 – 2:04 pm at Korakuen Stadium in Bunkyō, Tokyo

Team	1	2	3	4	5	6	7	8	9	R	H	E
Nishitetsu	0	0	0	0	0	0	0	0	0	0	4	0
Yomiuri	2	2	0	0	0	0	0	0	X	4	10	0
WP: Takumi Ōtomo (1–0) LP: Tokuji Kawasaki (0–1)

=== Game 2 ===
Thursday, October 11, 1956 – 2:05 pm at Korakuen Stadium in Bunkyō, Tokyo

Team	1	2	3	4	5	6	7	8	9	R	H	E
Nishitetsu	0	0	0	3	0	2	0	1	0	6	12	0
Yomiuri	1	0	0	0	1	1	0	0	0	3	8	1
WP: Yukio Shimabara (1–0) LP: Takehiko Bessho (0–1); Home runs: NIS: Seiji Sekiguchi (1), Futoshi Nakanishi (1); YOM: Takehiko Bessho (1), Tetsuharu Kawakami (1)

=== Game 3 ===
Saturday, October 13, 1956 – 2:02 pm at Heiwadai Stadium in Fukuoka, Fukuoka Prefecture

Team	1	2	3	4	5	6	7	8	9	R	H	E
Yomiuri	0	4	0	0	0	0	0	0	0	4	5	2
Nishitetsu	0	0	0	0	0	1	0	4	X	5	9	0
WP: Kazuhisa Inao (1–0) LP: Takehiko Bessho (0–2); Home runs: YOM: Tatsuro Hirooka (1); NIS: Yasumitsu Toyoda (1)

=== Game 4 ===
Sunday, October 14, 1956 – 2:00 pm at Heiwadai Stadium in Fukuoka, Fukuoka Prefecture

Team	1	2	3	4	5	6	7	8	9	R	H	E
Yomiuri	0	0	0	0	0	0	0	0	0	0	5	0
Nishitetsu	0	0	0	0	2	0	0	2	X	4	8	1
WP: Kazuhisa Inao (2–0) LP: Takumi Ōtomo (1–1); Home runs: YOM: None; NIS: Futoshi Nakanishi (2)

=== Game 5 ===
Monday, October 15, 1956 – 2:00 pm at Heiwadai Stadium in Fukuoka, Fukuoka Prefecture

Team	1	2	3	4	5	6	7	8	9	R	H	E
Yomiuri	0	0	0	0	5	0	0	5	2	12	15	2
Nishitetsu	0	1	1	0	0	3	2	0	0	7	15	1
WP: Taketoshi Yoshihara (1–0) LP: Sadao Nishimura (0–1); Home runs: YOM: None; NIS: Seiji Sekiguchi 2 (3)

=== Game 6 ===
Wednesday, October 17, 1956 – 2:00 pm at Korakuen Stadium in Bunkyō, Tokyo

Team	1	2	3	4	5	6	7	8	9	R	H	E
Nishitetsu	4	0	1	0	0	0	0	0	0	5	12	0
Yomiuri	0	0	0	0	0	1	0	0	0	1	4	0
WP: Kazuhisa Inao (3–0) LP: Takehiko Bessho (0–3); Home runs: NIS: Seiji Sekiguchi (4); YOM: Takashi Iwamoto (1)

== See also ==
- 1956 World Series
