= Noboru Aota =

Japanese baseball player (1924–1997)

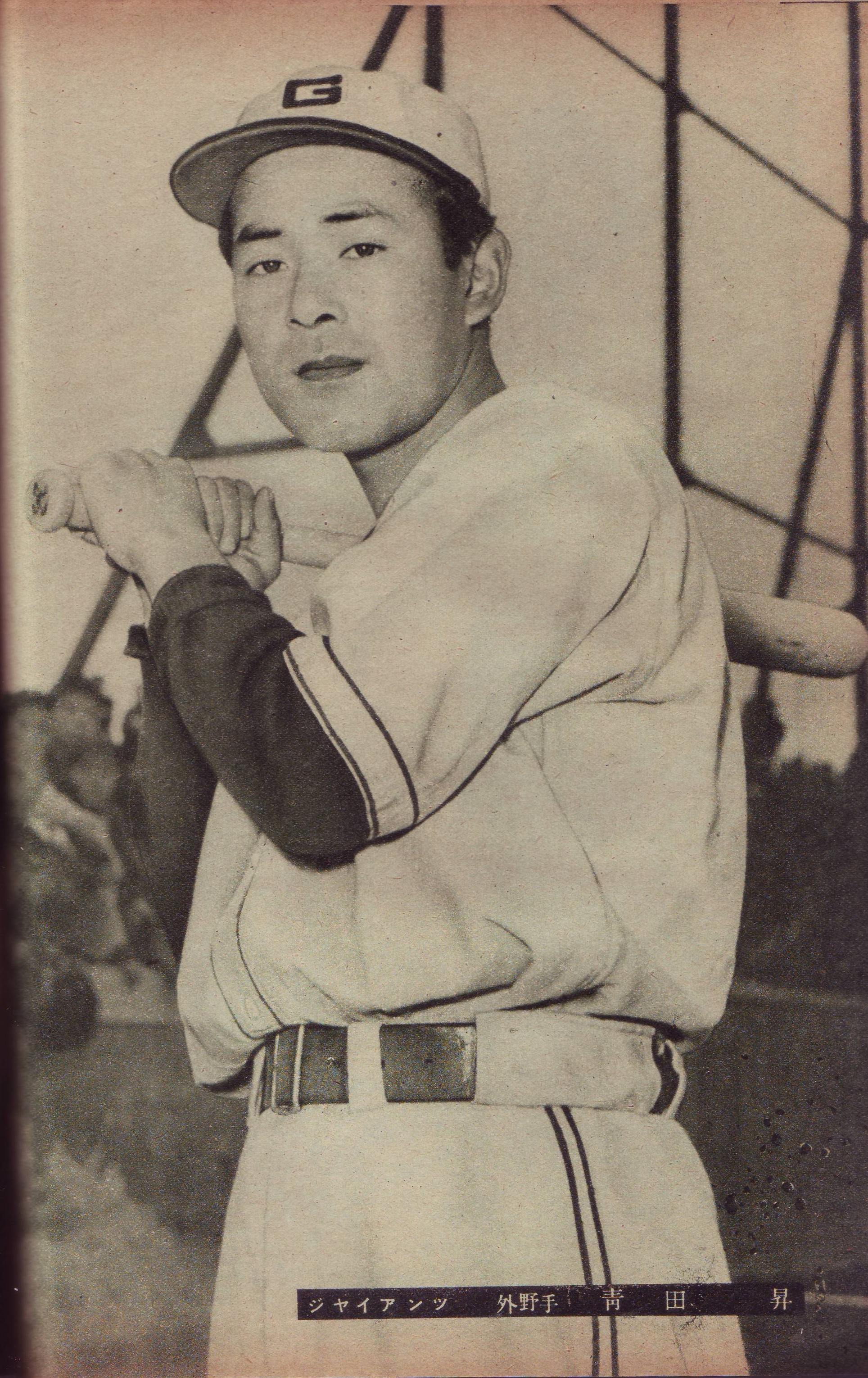
- Outfielder
- Born: November 22, 1924; Miki, Hyogo, Japan
- Died: November 4, 1997 (aged 72)
- Batted: Right Threw: Right

debut
- 1942, for the Tokyo Kyojin

Last appearance
- 1959, for the Hankyu Braves

Career statistics
- Batting average: .278
- Home runs: 265
- Hits: 1,827
- Runs batted in: 1,034
- Runs: 898

Teams
- As player: Tokyo Kyojin (1942–1943); Hankyu Braves (1946–1947); Yomiuri Giants (1948–1952); Taiyo-Shochiku Robins (1953–1958); Hankyu Braves (1959); As manager: Taiyo Whales (1973); As coach: Hanshin Tigers (1962–1963); Hankyu Braves (1965–1967); Taiyo Whales (1972); Yomiuri Giants (1980)

Career highlights and awards
- 2× JBL pennant (1942, 1943): 2× Japan Series champion (1951, 1952); 6× Best Nine Award (1948, 1950, 1951, 1955, 1956); 5× Home run champion (1948, 1951, 1954, 1956, 1957); 6× All-Star (1951–1953, 1955–1957); Hit for the cycle on April 23, 1953

Member of the Japanese

Baseball Hall of Fame
- Induction: 2009

Noboru Aota (青田 昇, Aota Noboru; November 22, 1924 – November 4, 1997) was a Japanese professional baseball player. An outfielder, he played with the Tokyo Kyojin/Yomiuri Giants, Hankyu Braves, and Taiyo-Shochiku Robins from 1942 to 1959, playing in both the Japanese Baseball League and Nippon Professional Baseball (NPB). A five-time league home run champion, he was one of the first true sluggers of Japanese professional baseball despite being a frame of 5'7" and weight of just 171 lbs. Aota was selected as a Best Nine Award-winner five times and a NPB All-Star six separate times. In 2009, he was inducted to the Japanese Baseball Hall of Fame.

== Biography ==
=== Playing career ===
Aota made his professional debut at age 17 in 1942 with the Tokyo Kyojin of the Japanese Baseball League (JBL). After the 1942 season (also with Tokyo), Aota left professional baseball to serve in the Japanese military through 1945. He returned to the JBL in 1946 with the Hankyu Braves, for whom he played through the 1947 season.

Upon joining the Yomiuri Giants (the renamed Tokyo Kyojin) in 1948, Aota became one of the league's top home run hitters. He was a Best Nine Award winner in 1948, winning the batting crown and the home run championship. He was again a Best Nine Award-winner in 1950, and in 1951 he led the Central League in home runs (32), RBI (105), and runs (101). He hit a home run in the 1951 Japan Series, when the Giants defeated the Nankai Hawks, 4 games to 2 for their first NPB championship.

Aota joined the Taiyo-Shochiku Robins in 1953 and led the Central League in home runs in 1954 and 1956, and tied for the league lead in 1957.

Aota retired in 1959 at age 34 as the Japanese professional baseball career leader with 265 career home runs (he was surpassed in 1963 by Kazuhiro Yamauchi, the first Japanese professional baseball player to hit 300 home runs). Aoto is one of the few Japanese players to surpass 1,000 RBI in his career. He also had 155 career stolen bases.

=== Coaching career ===
Aota returned to NPB in 1972 as a manager, taking over the Taiyo Whales mid-season and only going 1-14-2. He stayed on with Taiyo in 1973, when the team went 60-64-6. Aota then became a coach, but was forced into retirement from the Yomiuri Giants in 1980 after being quoted linking himself to the Yakuza in a Sunday Mainichi interview.

== See also ==
- List of Nippon Professional Baseball players with 1,000 runs batted in
