= Andy Miyamoto =

American baseball player (1933–2017)

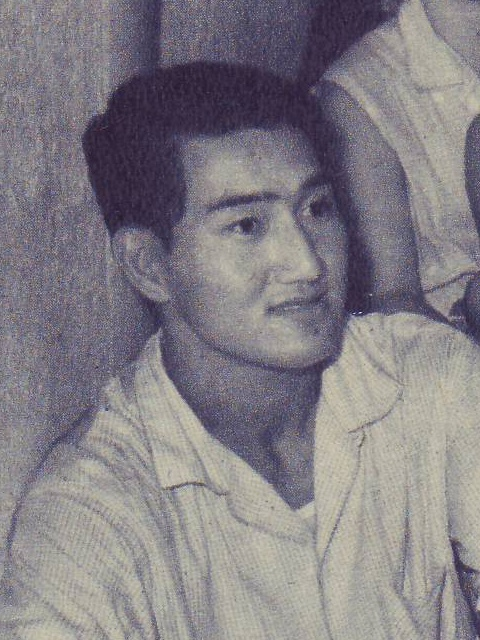
- Andy Miyamoto, 1956
- Outfielder
- Born: April 26, 1933; Maui, Hawaii Territory
- Died: December 19, 2017 (aged 84); Waipahu, Hawaii, U.S.
- Batted: Right Threw: Right

NPB debut
- 1955, for the Yomiuri Giants

Last appearance
- 1964, for the Kokutetsu Swallows

Career statistics
- Batting average: .249
- Home runs: 90
- Runs batted in: 359
- Stats at Baseball Reference

Teams
- Yomiuri Giants (1955–1962); Kokutetsu Swallows (1963–1964)

Career highlights and awards
- 2× Japan Series champion (1955, 1961); Japan Series Most Valuable Player Award (1961)

Andrew Toshio Miyamoto (宮本 敏雄, Miyamoto Toshio; born April 26, 1933 – December 19, 2017) was an American professional baseball outfielder. A Nisei, he was born in Maui, Hawaii Territory, and played in Japan's Nippon Professional Baseball (NPB) for the Yomiuri Giants and Kokutetsu Swallows. Miyamoto played one season of minor league baseball with the Hawaii Islanders of the Pacific Coast League in 1965, after he had retired from NPB.

He was married to the sister of former teammate Hirofumi Naito, the actress Kimiko Naito.

== Bibliography ==
- Fitts, Robert (2005). Remembering Japanese Baseball. SIU Press. ISBN 9780809389735.
