= Yasumitsu Toyoda =

Japanese baseball player and coach

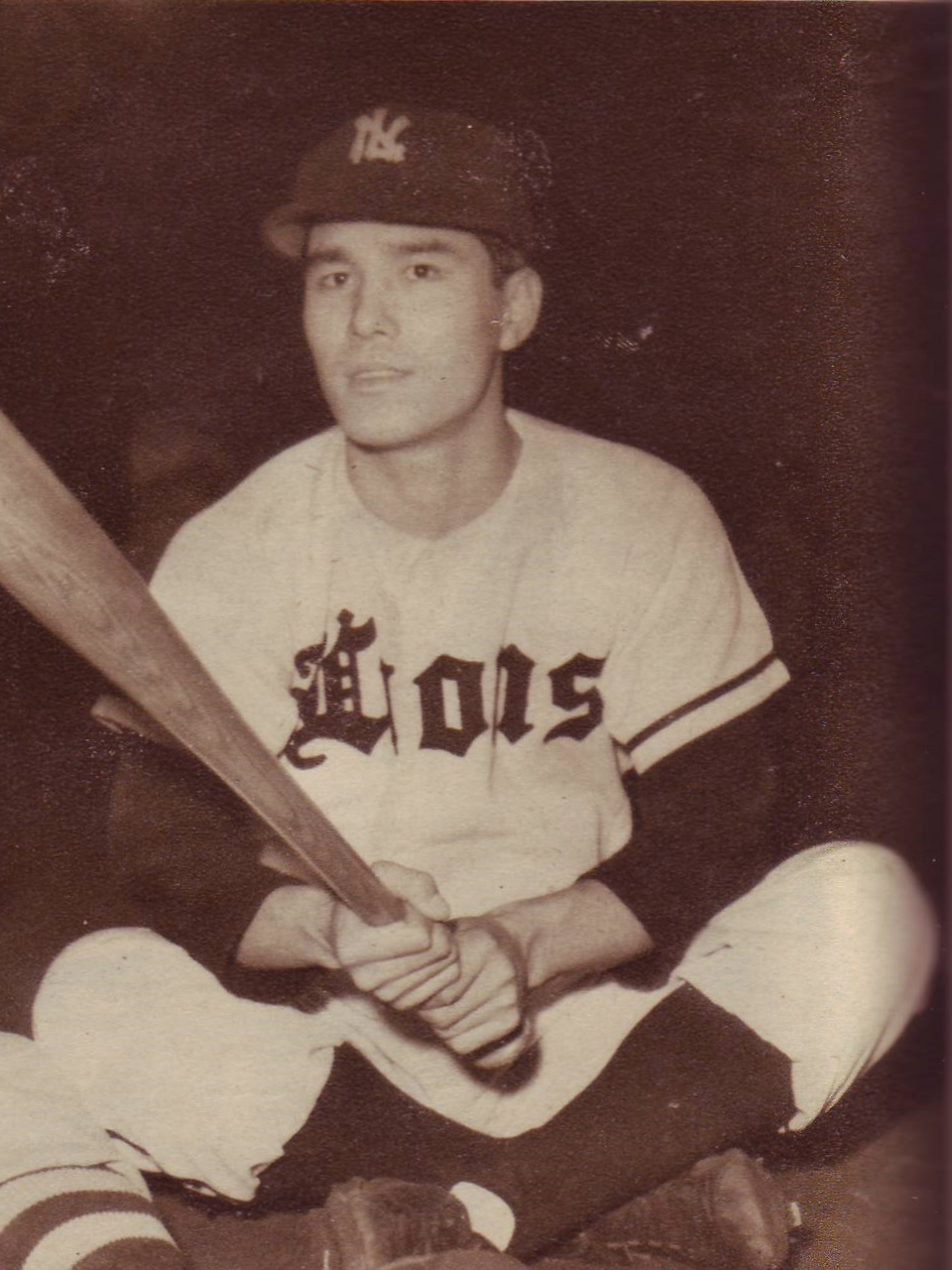
- Toyoda in the August 1956 issue of The Yakyukai
- Shortstop
- Born: February 12, 1935; Daigo, Ibaraki, Empire of Japan
- Died: August 14, 2016 (aged 81); Kawasaki, Kanagawa, Japan
- Batted: Right Threw: Right

NPB debut
- March 21, 1953, for the Nishitetsu Lions

Last appearance
- 1969, for the Sankei Atoms

NPB statistics
- Batting average: .277
- Home runs: 263
- Runs batted in: 888
- Hits: 1,699
- Stats at Baseball Reference

Teams
- As player: Nishitetsu Lions (1953–1962); Kokutetsu/Sankei Swallows/Sankei Atoms (1963–1969); As coach: Nishitetsu Lions (1962); Sankei Atoms (1968–1969); Kintetsu Buffaloes (1972)

Career highlights and awards
- Pacific League Rookie of the Year (1953); 3× Japan Series champion (1956, 1957, 1958); 6× Best Nine Award (1956–57, 1959–62)

Member of the Japanese

Baseball Hall of Fame
- Induction: 2006
- Election method: Special election

Yasumitsu Toyoda (豊田 泰光, Toyoda Yasumitsu; February 12, 1935 – August 14, 2016) was a Japanese professional baseball player and coach, who played as a shortstop. He played and coached for the Nishitetsu Lions and the Swallows franchise of Nippon Professional Baseball. In 1972, he coached the Kintetsu Buffaloes.

== Playing career ==
Toyoda was known as a good hitter, and especially renowned for his postseason performances. He led the Pacific League in batting average in 1956, spoiling a Triple Crown attempt by teammate Futoshi Nakanishi. He batted a career .362 in the Japan Series. He died in Kawasaki at the age of 81 on August 14, 2016.
