= Masaichi Kaneda =

Japanese baseball player (1933–2019)

Masaichi Kaneda 金田 正一
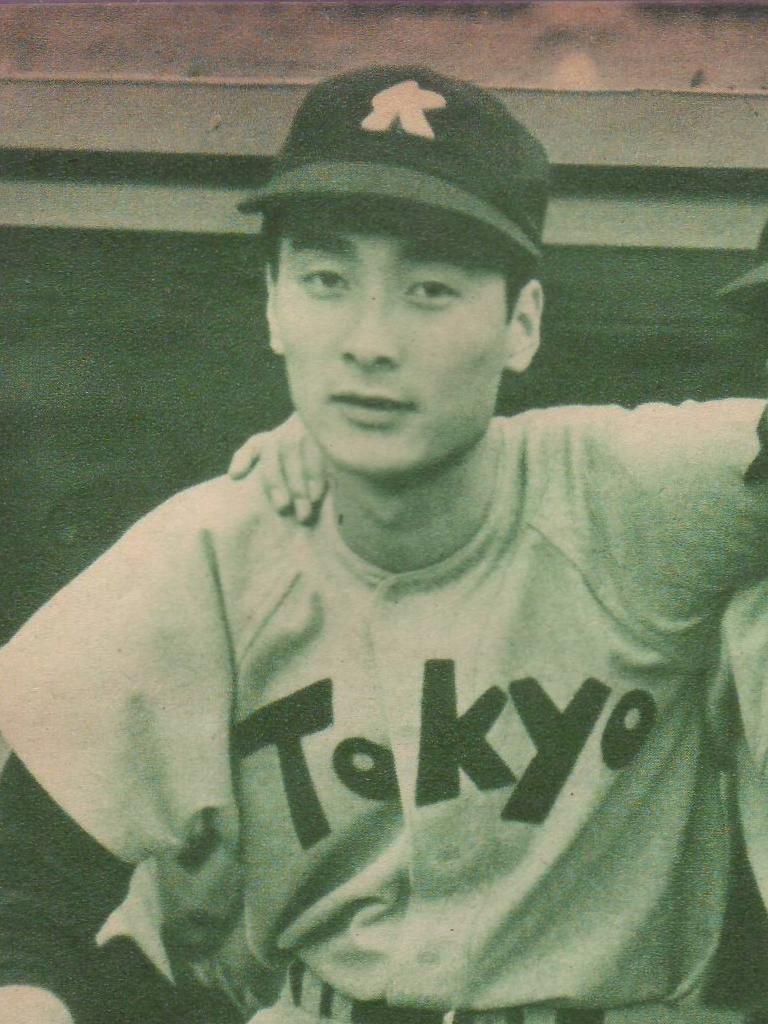
- Kaneda in 1956
- Pitcher
- Born: Kim Kyung-Hong; 1 August 1933; Heiwa, Nakashima, Aichi, Empire of Japan
- Died: 6 October 2019 (aged 86); Tokyo, Japan
- Batted: Left Threw: Left

NPB debut
- 23 August, 1950, for the Kokutetsu Swallows

Last appearance
- 18 October, 1969, for the Yomiuri Giants

NPB statistics
- Win–loss: 400–298
- Earned run average: 2.34
- Shutouts: 82
- Innings pitched: 5,526.2
- Strikeouts: 4,490

Career statistics
- Batting average: .198
- Hits: 406
- Home runs: 38
- Run batted in: 177

Teams
- As player: Kokutetsu Swallows (1950–1964); Yomiuri Giants (1965–1969); As manager: Lotte Orions (1973–1978, 1990–1991)

Career highlights and awards
- As player: 5x Japan Series champion (1965–1969); Japanese Triple Crown (1958); 14× 20-game winner; 3× Eiji Sawamura Award (1956–1958); 10× strikeouts leader; 3× ERA leader; Pitched two no-hitters; Pitched a perfect game on 21 August 1957; Yomiuri Giants #34 retired; As manager: Japan Series champion (1974)

Member of the Japanese

Baseball Hall of Fame
- Induction: 1988

Masaichi Kaneda (金田 正一, Kaneda Masaichi; 1 August 1933 – 6 October 2019) was a Japanese professional baseball pitcher of Zainichi Korean origin, one of the best-known pitchers in Japanese baseball history, and is the only Japanese pitcher to have won 400 games. He was inducted in the Japanese Baseball Hall of Fame in 1988.

Nicknamed "The Emperor" because he was the most dominant pitcher in Japan during his prime, Kaneda holds numerous Nippon Professional Baseball (NPB) career records. He won 400 games despite being on an extremely weak team, the Kokutetsu Swallows, for most of his career. About 90% of his 400 career wins came with the Swallows. He left for the Yomiuri Giants in 1965. In five seasons with the team, he won the Japan Series each time before retiring in 1969. Kaneda batted and threw left-handed. After his playing career ended, he became a manager for the Lotte Orions, where he managed in two different stints that saw him win the Japan Series in 1974.

== Career ==
Kaneda was born in Heiwa, Aichi Prefecture to Korean parents. He quit high school in 1950 and joined the Kokutetsu Swallows (currently known as the Tokyo Yakult Swallows) in the middle of 1950. The Swallows were a very weak team at that point in Japanese baseball, but Kaneda quickly became recognized as the best pitcher in Japan for his fastball and trademark drop curve. Kaneda also had terrible control during the first few years of his career, walking over 190 batters in 1951 and 1952. Although his control got better as his career progressed, he eventually established the all-time Japanese record for walks.

The speed gun was not introduced to Japan until after Kaneda had retired, but he claims that the velocity of his fastball reached 100 mph during his prime. In Kaneda's rookie year, player Masayasu Kaneda (no relation) from the Osaka Tigers complained that Kaneda's pitches appeared too fast because the mound was set too close to the batter's box. The game was stopped as the umpire measured the distance with a tape measure; the mound was found to be set the correct distance away from the batter's box. In later years, Noboru Aota admitted Kaneda's fastball was faster than Eiji Sawamura's one.

Despite the poor team surrounding him, Kaneda won 20 or more games for 14 straight seasons, including amassing 31 wins in 1958. However, despite marking an ERA under 2.00 for many of his seasons with the team, Kaneda still lost over at least 10 games a year in his first 15 professional seasons, including six seasons where he lost 20 or more games. When Kaneda was on the team, the Swallows didn't finish with a .500 record until 1961, and even then only finished in third place in the Central League.

He pitched a no-hitter against the Osaka Tigers in September 1951, and a perfect game against the Chunichi Dragons on 21 August 1957. This was the fourth perfect game in Japanese professional baseball history. In this game, he suffered from a stomach ache, and the Dragons took a long timeout to protest a call in the ninth with one out. After the timeout, he said to his teammates, "Only 6 strikes, so you guys get ready to go home.", and he went on to pitch a perfect game. In the 1958 season opener, Kaneda struck out Yomiuri Giants rookie Shigeo Nagashima in all four of his at bats. He did the same in 1959 against the Giants' Sadaharu Oh in Oh's first professional game.

Kaneda's massive workload and overuse of the curveball caused huge pain in his pitching arm during the last few years of his career; he eventually developed an underhanded changeup during his later years.

In 1965, Kaneda became a free agent and joined the Yomiuri Giants. His departure from the Swallows wasn't on good terms, as he hated Meiji Jingu Stadium, because of it being more hitter friendly and it having lackluster facilities compared to Korakuen Stadium. He also didn't like Sankei Shimbun's influence on the team (Sankei bought a minority stake in the team in the early 1960's, alongside Fuji TV, before buying them out completely in 1966), as being a Zainichi Korean, Sankei was infamously a far-right newspaper company, added to the fact they infamously published media openly denying the Imperial Japanese Army's war crimes in World War II. Kaneda contributed to the teams' nine-year league championship streak, and retired in 1969, after marking his 400th win. His jersey number, 34, was retired by the Giants in 1970.

Notable NPB records Kaneda holds include: complete games (365), wins (400), losses (298), strikeouts (4490), innings pitched (5,526 2/3), and walks (1,808). With 82 career shutouts, he is only one behind Victor Starffin for most all-time in NPB. He also hit the most home runs of any Japanese pitcher (36), and is one of the few pitchers that played in over 1,000 games. He led the league in strikeouts 10 times, victories three times, and ERA three times, and won the Eiji Sawamura Award three times. He also held the NPB record for career ejections (eight times), before being passed by Tuffy Rhodes in 2005.

== Post-retirement ==
Kaneda worked as a commentator before being called on to manage the Lotte Orions (currently known as the Chiba Lotte Marines) from 1973 to 1978, and again from 1990 to 1991. The Orions won the Japan Series championship in 1974, with Kaneda's younger brother, Tomehiro, pitching for the Orions and winning the MVP award. The Orions used uniforms designed by Kaneda for 19 seasons.

In 1978, Kaneda founded the Meikyukai, one of the two Japanese baseball halls of fame. The Meikyukai honors players born during the Shōwa period (1926–1988). Players are automatically inducted if they reach career totals of 2,000 hits, 200 wins, or 250 saves (added in December 2003) in the Japanese professional leagues.

He died on 6 October 2019, at the age of 86.

== Personal life ==
Kaneda’s parents were Korean immigrants to Japan and his Korean name was Kim Kyung-Hong (金慶弘 김경홍). Kaneda received his Japanese citizenship in 1959. His three younger brothers all played in the Japanese professional leagues and also became naturalized Japanese citizens.

Kaneda was married twice, and divorced once. He had three children. His son works as an actor, and his nephew Akihito Kaneishi also had considerable success as a professional baseball player.

== In popular culture ==
Shotaro Kaneda, the protagonist of Mitsuteru Yokoyama's giant robot manga series Tetsujin 28-go, is named after Kaneda.

== Career statistics ==
Played with the Kokutetsu Swallows from 1950 to 1964, Yomiuri Giants from 1965 to 1969.

- 944 Games
- 400 Wins
- 298 Losses
- 5,526 2/3 Innings pitched
- 4,490 Strikeouts
- 2.34 ERA

== Managerial statistics ==
Managed the Lotte Orions from 1973 to 1978, and 1990–1991.

- 1,011 Games
- 471 Wins
- 468 Losses
- 72 Ties
- Japanese Championship Series Winner (1974)
