= Kenjiro Tamiya =

Japanese baseball player and manager

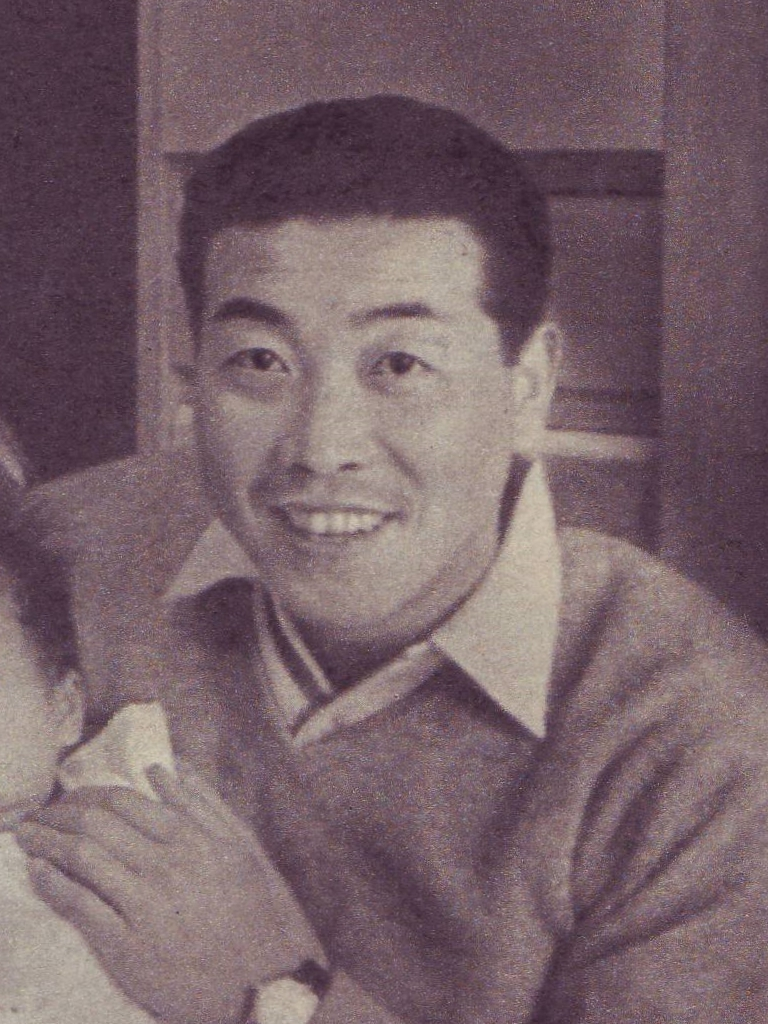
- Tamiya in 1959
- Pitcher / First baseman / Outfielder
- Born: February 11, 1928; Shimodate, Ibaraki, Japan
- Died: May 5, 2010 (aged 82); Ibaraki, Japan
- Batted: Left Threw: Left

NPB statistics
- Batting average: .298
- Home runs: 105
- Hits: 1,415
- RBIs: 591
- Stolen bases: 190
- Win–loss record: 1–5
- ERA: 5.83

Former teams
- As player: Osaka Tigers (1949–1958); Daimai Orions (1959–1963); As manager: Toei Flyers/Nittaku Home Flyers (1970–1974); Wei Chuan Dragons (1994–1995)

Career highlights and awards
- 5× Best Nine Award winner (1956–1958, 1960–1961); Fighting Spirit Award winner (1960)

Member of the Japanese

Baseball Hall of Fame
- Induction: 2002

Kenjiro Tamiya (田宮 健次郎, Tamiya Kenjiro; February 11, 1928 – May 5, 2010) was a Japanese Nippon Professional Baseball player and manager. In his early years as a professional player, Tamiya was utilized as a pitcher and first baseman, but during the prime of his career, he transitioned to playing as an outfielder. He was inducted into the Japanese Baseball Hall of Fame in 2002.

== Early life ==
Tamiya was born in Shimodate, Ibaraki and attended Shimodate Shogyo High School. He later attended Nihon University, where he won a Tokyo Metropolitan University League batting title in 1947, before dropping out.

== Professional career ==
Tamiya first played for the Osaka Tigers of the Japanese Baseball League, initially as a pitcher and occasionally as a first baseman. On March 16, 1950, he came within one out of throwing the first perfect game in Nippon Professional Baseball history, before Sakae Nakamura got a hit that ended the bid. A shoulder injury in 1952 forced him to move to the outfield, where he spent the remainder of his career. As a Tiger, Tamiya won the Best Nine Award three times, in 1956, 1957, and 1958. He also led the league in slugging percentage and triples in 1957, as well as batting average and triples in 1958. Tamiya signed with the Daimai Orions in 1959 and immediately tied for the league lead in doubles with Kazuhiro Yamauchi. He won the Best Nine Award two more times, in 1960 and 1961. He retired in 1963. Tamiya is one of only six NPB players who have both hit 100 home runs and earned a pitching win.

== Managerial career ==
In 1969, Tamiya became a hitting coach for the Chunichi Dragons. The following year, he became the manager of the Toei Flyers, where he managed for three years, finishing with a record of 155–209–21 as the Flyers' skipper. In 1994 and 1995, he managed the Wei Chuan Dragons of the Chinese Professional Baseball League, finishing with a record of 83–104–3.

== Later life and death ==
In 2000, Tamiya became a council member for his hometown, Shimodate. He died on May 5, 2010, at the age of 82 due to a brain hemorrhage.

== See also ==
- Jiro Tamiya - a Daiei Film actor whose stage name was forcefully given by Masaichi Nagata after Kenjiro Tamiya.
