= Futoshi Nakanishi =

Japanese baseball player and manager (1933–2023)

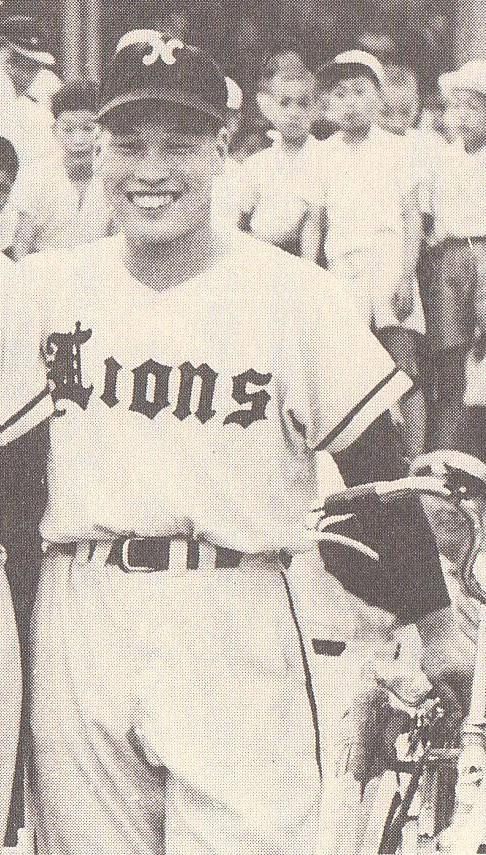
- Nakanishi at the 1954 NPB All-Star game
- Infielder
- Born: April 11, 1933; Takamatsu, Kagawa, Japan
- Died: May 11, 2023 (aged 90)
- Batted: Right Threw: Right

NPB debut
- March 21, 1952, for the Nishitetsu Lions

Last appearance
- October 8, 1969, for the Nishitetsu Lions

NPB statistics
- Batting average: .307
- Home runs: 244
- Runs batted in: 785
- Hits: 1,262
- Stats at Baseball Reference

Managerial statistics
- Wins: 748
- Losses: 811

Teams
- As player: Nishitetsu Lions (1952–1969); As manager: Nishitetsu Lions (1962–1969); Nippon Ham-Fighters (1974–1975); Hanshin Tigers (1980–1981); Yakult Swallows (1984); Chiba Lotte Marines (1994); As coach: Yakult Swallows (1971–1973, 1983); Hanshin Tigers (1979); Kintetsu Buffaloes (1985–1990); Yomiuri Giants (1992); Orix BlueWave (1995–1997)

Career highlights and awards
- Pacific League Rookie of the Year (1952); Pacific League Most Valuable Player Award (1956); 7× Best Nine Award (1953–1958; 1961); 3× Japan Series champion (1956, 1957, 1958)

Member of the Japanese

Baseball Hall of Fame
- Induction: 1999

Futoshi Nakanishi (中西 太, Nakanishi Futoshi; April 11, 1933 – May 11, 2023) was a Japanese professional baseball infielder, coach, and manager. He spent all of his playing career with the Nishitetsu Lions of Nippon Professional Baseball, and served as player-manager of the team from 1962 to 1969. Nakanishi also managed the Nippon-Ham Fighters, Hanshin Tigers, Yakult Swallows, and Chiba Lotte Marines. He coached for the Swallows, Kintetsu Buffaloes, Yomiuri Giants, and Orix BlueWave.

== Playing career ==
Nakanishi began playing baseball in junior high school. At the time, his team did not have any baseball equipment. The group practiced side by side with the American soldiers stationed in Japan after World War II. Nakanishi and his teammates would pick up and practice with baseballs military personnel had left behind. During his high school baseball career, Nakanishi played in the Japanese High School Baseball Championship three times. He had planned to attend Waseda University, but his parents negotiated Nakanishi's first contract with the Nishitetsu Lions without his consent. He hit 12 home runs in his rookie season and subsequently decided to hone his power stroke. Due to his small build, Nakanishi had to twist and contort his body during at bats to generate power. He came close to the Triple Crown in four seasons, (1953, 1955, 1956, 1958) but never won. In 1953, Isami Okamoto led the league in hits, while Nakanishi finished second. In 1955, Nakanishi lost the RBI title to Kazuhiro Yamauchi. The next year, he finished second in batting average to teammate Yasumitsu Toyoda. In 1958, Takao Katsuragi denied Nakanishi the RBI title for the second time. Nakanishi was spiked during the 1959 season, and suffered tendonitis in his wrist in 1960. He played through the wrist injury in a bid to improve his arm strength. However, both injuries sapped his effectiveness as a player and he succeeded Tokuji Kawasaki as Lions' manager in 1962, playing the field occasionally until 1969.

As a manager, he reached the Japan Series once in the 1963 Japan Series, where he lost to the Yomiuri Giants in seven games. In eight seasons as Lions manager, they finished 2nd twice and third twice but was let go after finishing 5th in 1969. He managed the Nippon Ham-Fighters to finishes of 6th and 4th in 1974 and 1975. He managed Hanshin for 5th and 3rd place finishes in 1980 and 1981 before his next managerial spot came with the Yakult Swallows in 1984, where they finished 5th for his one season. He managed the Chiba Lotte Marines in 1994, who finished 5th with a record of 55-73-2.

== Personal life and death ==
For most of his own playing career, Nakanishi was managed by Osamu Mihara. Nakanishi married Mihara's daughter Toshiko in 1956.

Nakanishi died of heart failure on May 11, 2023, at the age of 90.
