= Kazuhisa Inao =

Japanese baseball player (1937–2007)

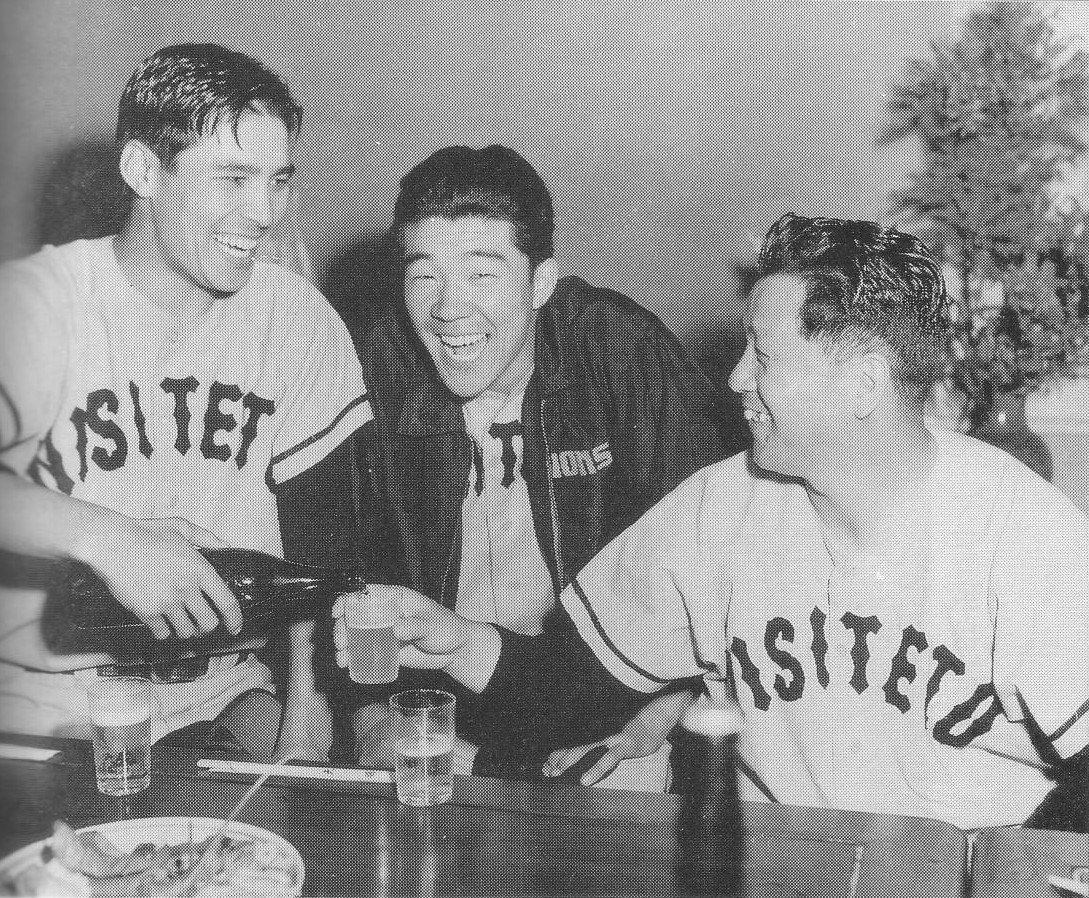
- Inao (center) with teammate Yasumitsu Toyoda(left) and manager Osamu Mihara during the 1956 Japan Series
- Pitcher
- Born: June 10, 1937; Beppu, Ōita, Japan
- Died: November 13, 2007 (aged 70)
- Batted: Right Threw: Right

NPB debut
- March 21, 1956, for the Nishitetsu Lions

Last appearance
- 1969, for the Nishitetsu Lions

NPB statistics
- Win–loss: 276–137
- Earned run average: 1.98
- Shutouts: 43
- Innings pitched: 3,599
- Strikeouts: 2,574
- Stats at Baseball Reference

Teams
- As player: Nishitetsu Lions (1956–1969); As manager: Nishitetsu Lions/Taiheiyo Club Lions (1970–1974); Lotte Orions (1984–1986)

Career highlights and awards
- NPB: 2x Japanese Triple Crown (1958), (1961); Pacific League Rookie of the Year (1956); 2× Pacific League MVP (1957, 1958); 3× Japan Series champion (1956, 1957, 1958); 4x Wins champion (1957, 1958, 1961, 1963); 2x Winning percentage champion (1957, 1961); 5x ERA Champion(1956–1958, 1961, 1966); 3x Strikeout champion (1958, 1961, 1963); 5x Best Nine Award (1957–1958, 1961–1963); Japan Series MVP (1958); Fighting Spirit Award (1956); Seibu Lions #24 retired; NPB Records: 42 wins (1961) (National Record, tied); 20 consecutive wins (1957) (National Record); 78 games played (1961) (Pacific League Record); 1.06 ERA (1956) (Pacific League Record, National Rookie-Year Record); 404 innings Pitched (1961) (Pacific League Record); 11 wins in single month (Aug, 1956) (National Record); 4 complete games in single Japan Series (1958) (Japan Series Record, tied); 4 wins in single Japan Series (1958) (Japan Series Record, tied); 11 career wins in Japan Series (tied with Tsuneo Horiuchi)

Member of the Japanese

Baseball Hall of Fame
- Induction: 1993

Kazuhisa Inao (稲尾 和久, Inao Kazuhisa; June 10, 1937 – November 13, 2007) was a Japanese pitcher and manager in Nippon Professional Baseball. He played all of his professional seasons for the Nishitetsu Lions.

In the 1956 Japan Series, he won all three of his starts to deliver the Lions their first championship. He was given the Fighting Spirit Award, becoming the first (and so far only) player to be given the award for the winning team. In 1957, he won 20 consecutive games and both of his Japan Series starts in another championship run. In the 1958 Japan Series, tasked to save his team from a 3–0 series deficit, he started four consecutive games and won all of them to become the first NPB team to overcome a 3–0 series deficit, and Inao even hit a home in the Game 5 victory as the Lions won their third straight title; he was named Series MVP for his efforts (he was the second player to have won Japan Series MVP and Fighting Spirit Award for a career). He was the Pacific League's Most Valuable Player in 1957 and 1958. He had 42 wins in 1961. Fans called his great success "God, Buddha, Inao".

In 1964, he injured his shoulder but came back to full-time pitching, mainly in relief the next season. He retired as a player in 1969, and went on to manage the Nishitetsu Lions from 1970 to 1974.

He was inducted into the Japanese Baseball Hall of Fame in 1993. His number 24 was retired by the Saitama Seibu Lions on April 30, 2012.

== Career statistics ==
| Year | Team | G | CG | SHO | W | L | PCT | IP | H | HR | BB | HBP | SO | WP | R | ER | ERA |
|---|---|---|---|---|---|---|---|---|---|---|---|---|---|---|---|---|---|
| 1956 | Nishitetsu; Lions | 61 | 6 | 3 | 21 | 6 | .778 | 262.1 | 153 | 2 | 73 | 8 | 182 | 2 | 47 | 31 | **1.06** |
| 1957 | Nishitetsu; Lions | **68** | 20 | 5 | **35** | 6 | **.854** | 373.2 | 243 | 14 | 76 | 7 | 288 | 1 | 72 | 57 | **1.37** |
| 1958 | Nishitetsu; Lions | **72** | 19 | 6 | **33** | 10 | .767 | 373.0 | 269 | 8 | 76 | 4 | **334** | 2 | 74 | 59 | **1.42** |
| 1959 | Nishitetsu; Lions | **75** | 23 | 5 | 30 | 15 | .667 | 402.1 | 300 | 14 | 82 | 9 | 321 | 1 | 86 | 74 | 1.65 |
| 1960 | Nishitetsu; Lions | 39 | 19 | 3 | 20 | 7 | .741 | 243.0 | 211 | 15 | 51 | 4 | 179 | 0 | 80 | 70 | 2.59 |
| 1961 | Nishitetsu; Lions | **78** | 25 | 7 | **42** | 14 | **.750** | **404.0** | 308 | 22 | 72 | 6 | **353** | 3 | 93 | 76 | **1.69** |
| 1962 | Nishitetsu; Lions | 57 | 23 | 6 | 25 | 18 | .581 | 320.2 | 281 | 27 | 56 | 4 | 228 | 1 | 98 | 82 | 2.30 |
| 1963 | Nishitetsu; Lions | **74** | 24 | 2 | **28** | 16 | .636 | 386.1 | **358** | 26 | 70 | 10 | **226** | 1 | 121 | 109 | 2.54 |
| 1964 | Nishitetsu; Lions | 6 | 0 | 0 | 0 | 2 | .000 | 11.1 | 18 | 2 | 9 | 0 | 2 | 0 | 13 | 13 | 10.64 |
| 1965 | Nishitetsu; Lions | 38 | 13 | 2 | 13 | 6 | .684 | 216.0 | 191 | 16 | 50 | 4 | 101 | 0 | 71 | 57 | 2.38 |
| 1966 | Nishitetsu; Lions | 54 | 2 | 2 | 11 | 10 | .524 | 185.2 | 134 | 11 | 23 | 5 | 134 | 0 | 45 | 37 | **1.79** |
| 1967 | Nishitetsu; Lions | 46 | 3 | 1 | 8 | 9 | .471 | 129.0 | 114 | 11 | 22 | 5 | 87 | 1 | 40 | 38 | 2.65 |
| 1968 | Nishitetsu; Lions | 56 | 2 | 1 | 9 | 11 | .450 | 195.0 | 168 | 22 | 32 | 5 | 93 | 0 | 68 | 60 | 2.77 |
| 1969 | Nishitetsu; Lions | 32 | 0 | 0 | 1 | 7 | .125 | 97.0 | 92 | 9 | 27 | 2 | 46 | 0 | 36 | 30 | 2.78 |
| Career Total | | 756 | 179 | 43 | 276 | 137 | .668 | 3599.0 | 2840 | 199 | 719 | 73 | 2574 | 12 | 944 | 793 | 1.98 |
| Career Total | | (7th) | | | (8th) | | | (10th) | | | | | (8th) | | | | (3rd) |

- **Bolded figures** are league-leading

=== Titles and Award ===
- Rookie of the Year : (1956)
- Wins Champion : 4 times (1957,1958,1961,1963)
- Winning Percentage Champion: 2 times (1957,1961)
- ERA Champion : 5 times (1956–1958,1961,1966)
- Strikeout Champion : 3 times (1958,1961,1963)
- MVP : 2 times (1957–1958)
- Best Nine : 5 times (1957–1958,1961–1963)

=== Record ===
- 42 Wins (1961) (National Record, tied)
- 20 consecutive wins (1957) (National Record)
- 78 Games Played (1961) (Pacific League Record)
- 1.06 ERA (1956) (Pacific League Record, National Rookie-Year Record)
- 404 inning Pitched (1961) (Pacific League Record)
- 11 wins in single month (Aug, 1956) (National Record)
- 4 complete game in single Japan Series (1958) (Japan Series Record, tied)
- 4 wins in single Japan Series (1958) (Japan Series Record, tied)
- 11 career wins in Japan Series (tied with Tsuneo Horiuchi)
