= Pacific League =

Nippon Professional Baseball league

- Sport: Baseball
- Founded: November 26, 1949; 76 years ago as Taiheiyo Baseball Union in Tokyo
- No. of teams: 6
- Country: Japan
- Most recent champion: Fukuoka SoftBank Hawks (21st title)
- Most titles: Saitama Seibu Lions (23)
- Website: NPB.jp/pl

The Pacific League (パシフィック・リーグ, Pashifikku Rīgu), or Pa League (パ・リーグ, Pa Rīgu), or the Persol Pacific League (パーソルパシフィック・リーグ, Pāsoru pashifikku rīgu), due to sponsorship reasons, is one of the two professional baseball leagues constituting Nippon Professional Baseball in Japan. The winner of the league championship competes against the winner in the Central League for the annual Japan Series. It currently consists of six teams from around Japan.

== History ==
The circuit was founded as the Taiheiyo Baseball Union (太平洋野球連盟, Taiheiyo Yakyu Renmei) in 1949 (the name changing to its current form in 1980). Daiei Stars owner Masaichi Nagata was the first president of the Pacific League.

The league began with seven teams: four holdovers from the previous iteration, the Japanese Baseball League—the Hankyu Braves, the Nankai Hawks, the Daiei Stars, and the Tokyu Flyers—and three new teams—the Kintetsu Pearls, the Mainichi Orions, and the Nishitetsu Clippers.

In 1954, an eighth Pacific League team was founded, the Takahashi Unions, to increase the number of teams to eight. Although the team was stocked with players from the other Pacific League teams, the Unions struggled from the outset and finished in the second division every season. In 1957, the Unions were merged with the Daiei Stars to form the Daiei Unions (and again bringing the number of Pacific League teams down to seven). In their first season, the Unions finished in last place, 43 1/2 games out of first. In 1958, the Unions merged with the Mainichi Orions to form the Daimai Orions. This enabled the Pacific League to shrink from the ungainly seven-team arrangement to six teams.

Fujio Nakazawa, a former player and television commentator, became the PL's first full-time president in 1959, serving through 1965.

From 1973 to 1982, the Pacific League employed a split season, with the first-half winner playing against the second-half winner in a mini-playoff to determine its champion; in two of the eight seasons, a team won both halves of the season to simply advance to the Japan Series.

Beginning in 1975, the Pacific League began using the designated hitter (DH), as in the American League in Major League Baseball. During interleague play (adopted in 2005), the DH is used in Pacific League teams' home games.

After the 2004 Nippon Professional Baseball season, the Orix BlueWave and the Osaka Kintetsu Buffaloes merged to form the Orix Buffaloes. A franchise was granted to internet shopping company Rakuten and the city of Sendai, forming the Tohoku Rakuten Golden Eagles to fill the void caused by the merger.

Also since 2004, a three-team playoff system was introduced in the Pacific League (Pacific League Championship Series). The teams with the second- and third-best records play in the three-game first stage, with the winner advancing to a best-of-six final against the top team (the Pacific League pennant winner is granted a 1 game advantage in the Final Stage). The winner becomes the representative of the Pacific League to the Japan Series.

Since the Pacific League won every Japan Series after introducing this system, an identical system was introduced to the Central League in 2007, and the post-season intra-league games were renamed the "Climax Series" in both leagues. Player statistics and drafting order based on team records are not affected by these postseason games.

== Current teams ==
Team	Japanese name	Founded	Location	Stadium	Owner
Chiba Lotte Marines	千葉ロッテマリーンズ; Chiba Rotte Marīnzu	November 26, 1949	Mihama-ku, Chiba, Chiba	ZOZO Marine Stadium	Lotte Holdings
Fukuoka SoftBank Hawks	福岡ソフトバンクホークス; Fukuoka Sofutobanku Hōkusu	February 22, 1938	Chūō-ku, Fukuoka, Fukuoka	Mizuho PayPay Dome Fukuoka	SoftBank Group
Hokkaido Nippon-Ham Fighters	北海道日本ハムファイターズ; Hokkaidō Nippon-Hamu Faitāzu	November 6, 1945	Kitahiroshima, Hokkaidō	Es Con Field Hokkaido	Nippon Ham
Orix Buffaloes	オリックス・バファローズ; Orikkusu Bafarōzu	January 23, 1936	HQ in Osaka Plays between Osaka and Hyogo	Kyocera Dome Osaka and Hotto Motto Field	Orix
Saitama Seibu Lions	埼玉西武ライオンズ; Saitama Seibu Raionzu	November 26, 1949	Tokorozawa, Saitama	Belluna Dome	Seibu Group
Tōhoku Rakuten Golden Eagles	東北楽天ゴールデンイーグルス; Tōhoku Rakuten Gōruden Īgurusu	November 2, 2004	Miyagino-ku, Sendai, Miyagi	Rakuten Mobile Park Miyagi	Rakuten

== Pacific League pennant winners ==
Year	Team	W	L	T	Postseason Result
1950	Mainichi Orions	81	34	5	Won 1950 Japan Series 4–2 over the Shochiku Robins
1951	Nankai Hawks	72	24	8	Lost 1951 Japan Series 1–4 to the Yomiuri Giants
1952	Nankai Hawks	76	44	1	Lost 1952 Japan Series 2–4 to the Yomiuri Giants
1953	Nankai Hawks	71	48	1	Lost 1953 Japan Series 2–4–1 to the Yomiuri Giants
1954	Nishitetsu Lions	90	47	3	Lost 1954 Japan Series 3–4 to the Chunichi Dragons
1955	Nankai Hawks	99	41	3	Lost 1955 Japan Series 3–4 to the Yomiuri Giants
1956	Nishitetsu Lions	96	51	7	Won 1956 Japan Series 4–2 over the Yomiuri Giants
1957	Nishitetsu Lions	83	44	5	Won 1957 Japan Series 4–0–1 over the Yomiuri Giants
1958	Nishitetsu Lions	78	47	5	Won 1958 Japan Series 4–3 over the Yomiuri Giants
1959	Nankai Hawks	88	42	4	Won 1959 Japan Series 4–0 over the Yomiuri Giants
1960	Daimai Orions	82	48	3	Lost 1960 Japan Series 0–4 to the Taiyō Whales
1961	Nankai Hawks	85	49	6	Lost 1961 Japan Series 2–4 to the Yomiuri Giants
1962	Toei Flyers	78	52	3	Won 1962 Japan Series 4–2–1 over the Hanshin Tigers
1963	Nishitetsu Lions	86	60	4	Lost 1963 Japan Series 3–4 to the Yomiuri Giants
1964	Nankai Hawks	84	63	3	Won 1964 Japan Series 4–3 over the Hanshin Tigers
1965	Nankai Hawks	88	49	3	Lost 1965 Japan Series 1–4 to the Yomiuri Giants
1966	Nankai Hawks	79	51	3	Lost 1966 Japan Series 2–4 to the Yomiuri Giants
1967	Hankyu Braves	75	55	4	Lost 1967 Japan Series 2–4 to the Yomiuri Giants
1968	Hankyu Braves	80	50	4	Lost 1968 Japan Series 2–4 to the Yomiuri Giants
1969	Hankyu Braves	76	50	4	Lost 1969 Japan Series 2–4 to the Yomiuri Giants
1970	Lotte Orions	80	47	3	Lost 1970 Japan Series 1–4 to the Yomiuri Giants
1971	Hankyu Braves	80	39	11	Lost 1971 Japan Series 1–4 to the Yomiuri Giants
1972	Hankyu Braves	80	48	2	Lost 1972 Japan Series 1–4 to the Yomiuri Giants
1973	Nankai Hawks	68	58	4	Lost 1973 Japan Series 1–4 to the Yomiuri Giants
1974	Lotte Orions	69	50	11	Won 1974 Japan Series 4–2 over the Chunichi Dragons
1975	Hankyu Braves	64	59	7	Won 1975 Japan Series 4–0–2 over the Hiroshima Toyo Carp
1976	Hankyu Braves	79	45	6	Won 1976 Japan Series 4–3 over the Yomiuri Giants
1977	Hankyu Braves	69	51	10	Won 1977 Japan Series 4–1 over the Yomiuri Giants
1978	Hankyu Braves	82	39	9	Lost 1978 Japan Series 3–4 to the Yakult Swallows
1979	Kintetsu Buffaloes	74	45	11	Lost 1979 Japan Series 3–4 to the Hiroshima Toyo Carp
1980	Kintetsu Buffaloes	68	54	8	Lost 1980 Japan Series 3–4 to the Hiroshima Toyo Carp
1981	Nippon-Ham Fighters	68	54	8	Lost 1981 Japan Series 2–4 to the Yomiuri Giants
1982	Seibu Lions	68	58	4	Won 1982 Japan Series 4–2 over the Chunichi Dragons
1983	Seibu Lions	86	40	4	Won 1983 Japan Series 4–3 the Yomiuri Giants
1984	Hankyu Braves	75	45	10	Lost 1984 Japan Series 3–4 to the Hiroshima Toyo Carp
1985	Seibu Lions	79	45	6	Lost 1985 Japan Series 2–4 to the Hanshin Tigers
1986	Seibu Lions	68	49	13	Won 1986 Japan Series 4–3–1 over the Hiroshima Toyo Carp
1987	Seibu Lions	71	45	14	Won 1987 Japan Series 4–2 over the Yomiuri Giants
1988	Seibu Lions	73	51	6	Won 1988 Japan Series 4–1 over the Chunichi Dragons
1989	Kintetsu Buffaloes	71	54	5	Lost 1989 Japan Series 3–4 to the Yomiuri Giants
1990	Seibu Lions	81	45	4	Won 1990 Japan Series 4–0 over the Yomiuri Giants
1991	Seibu Lions	81	43	6	Won 1991 Japan Series 4–3 over the Hiroshima Toyo Carp
1992	Seibu Lions	80	47	3	Won 1992 Japan Series 4–3 over the Yakult Swallows
1993	Seibu Lions	74	53	3	Lost 1993 Japan Series 3–4 to the Yakult Swallows
1994	Seibu Lions	76	52	2	Lost 1994 Japan Series 2–4 to the Yomiuri Giants
1995	Orix BlueWave	82	47	1	Lost 1995 Japan Series 1–4 to the Yakult Swallows
1996	Orix BlueWave	74	50	6	Won 1996 Japan Series 4–1 over the Yomiuri Giants
1997	Seibu Lions	76	56	3	Lost 1997 Japan Series 1–4 to the Yakult Swallows
1998	Seibu Lions	70	61	4	Lost 1998 Japan Series 2–4 to the Yokohama BayStars
1999	Fukuoka Daiei Hawks	78	54	3	Won 1999 Japan Series 4–1 over the Chunichi Dragons
2000	Fukuoka Daiei Hawks	73	60	2	Lost 2000 Japan Series 2–4 to the Yomiuri Giants
2001	Osaka Kintetsu Buffaloes	78	60	2	Lost 2001 Japan Series 1–4 to the Yakult Swallows
2002	Seibu Lions	90	49	1	Lost 2002 Japan Series 0–4 to the Yomiuri Giants
2003	Fukuoka Daiei Hawks	82	55	3	Won 2003 Japan Series 4–3 over the Hanshin Tigers
2004*	Seibu Lions	74	58	1	Won 2004 Japan Series 4–3 over the Chunichi Dragons
2005*	Chiba Lotte Marines	84	49	3	Won 2005 Japan Series 4–0 over the Hanshin Tigers
2006*	Hokkaido Nippon-Ham Fighters	82	54	0	Won 2006 Japan Series 4–1 over the Chunichi Dragons
2007	Hokkaido Nippon-Ham Fighters	79	60	5	Lost 2007 Japan Series 1–4 to the Chunichi Dragons
2008	Saitama Seibu Lions	76	64	4	Won 2008 Japan Series 4–3 over the Yomiuri Giants
2009	Hokkaido Nippon-Ham Fighters	82	60	2	Lost 2009 Japan Series 2–4 to the Yomiuri Giants
2010	Fukuoka SoftBank Hawks	76	63	5	Lost 2010 Pacific League Climax Series 3–4 to the Chiba Lotte Marines
2011	Fukuoka SoftBank Hawks	88	46	10	Won 2011 Japan Series 4–3 over the Chunichi Dragons
2012	Hokkaido Nippon-Ham Fighters	74	59	11	Lost 2012 Japan Series 2–4 to the Yomiuri Giants
2013	Tohoku Rakuten Golden Eagles	82	59	3	Won 2013 Japan Series 4–3 over the Yomiuri Giants
2014	Fukuoka SoftBank Hawks	78	60	6	Won 2014 Japan Series 4–1 over the Hanshin Tigers
2015	Fukuoka SoftBank Hawks	90	49	4	Won 2015 Japan Series 4–1 over the Tokyo Yakult Swallows
2016	Hokkaido Nippon-Ham Fighters	87	53	3	Won 2016 Japan Series 4–2 over the Hiroshima Toyo Carp
2017	Fukuoka SoftBank Hawks	94	49	0	Won 2017 Japan Series 4–2 over the Yokohama DeNA BayStars
2018	Saitama Seibu Lions	88	53	2	Lost 2018 Pacific League Climax Series 2–4 to the Fukuoka SoftBank Hawks
2019	Saitama Seibu Lions	80	62	1	Lost 2019 Pacific League Climax Series 1–4 to the Fukuoka SoftBank Hawks
2020	Fukuoka SoftBank Hawks	73	42	5	Won 2020 Japan Series 4–0 over the Yomiuri Giants
2021	Orix Buffaloes	70	55	18	Lost 2021 Japan Series 2–4 to the Tokyo Yakult Swallows
2022	Orix Buffaloes	76	65	2	Won 2022 Japan Series 4–2–1 over the Tokyo Yakult Swallows
2023	Orix Buffaloes	86	53	4	Lost 2023 Japan Series 3–4 to the Hanshin Tigers
2024	Fukuoka SoftBank Hawks	91	49	3	Lost 2024 Japan Series 2–4 to the Yokohama DeNA BayStars
2025	Fukuoka SoftBank Hawks	87	52	4	Won 2025 Japan Series 4–1 over the Hanshin Tigers
2026	Fukuoka SoftBank Hawks	91	49	3	Won 2026 Japan Series 4–0 over the Yokohama DeNA BayStars

*From 2004 to 2006 the winner of the play-offs was considered Pacific League Champion, afterwards the regular season champion again.

== Pacific League statistics ==
Team	First	Second	Third
Saitama Seibu Lions	23	12	15
Fukuoka SoftBank Hawks	21	17	7
Orix Buffaloes	15	15	9
Hokkaido Nippon-Ham Fighters	7	9	15
Chiba Lotte Marines	5	9	14
Osaka Kintetsu Buffaloes	4	9	8
Tohoku Rakuten Golden Eagles	1	1	3
Daiei Unions	0	0	2
Takahashi Unions	0	0	0

== Most Valuable Pitcher ==
See: Best Nine Award#Other notes

== See also ==
- Nippon Professional Baseball
