= 1960 Nippon Professional Baseball season =

1960 NPB season
- League: Nippon Professional Baseball
- Sport: Baseball

Central League pennant
- League champions: Taiyo Whales
- Runners-up: Yomiuri Giants
- Season MVP: Noboru Akiyama (TAI)

Pacific League pennant
- League champions: Daimai Orions
- Runners-up: Nankai Hawks
- Season MVP: Kazuhiro Yamauchi (DAI)

Japan Series
- Champions: Taiyo Whales
- Runners-up: Daimai Orions
- Finals MVP: Akihito Kondo (TAI)

NPB seasons
- ← 1959 1961 →

The 1960 Nippon Professional Baseball season was the eleventh season of operation of Nippon Professional Baseball (NPB).

== Regular season ==
=== Standings ===
Central League regular season standings
| Team | G | W | L | T | Pct. | GB |
|---|---|---|---|---|---|---|
| Taiyo Whales | 130 | 70 | 56 | 4 | .554 | — |
| Yomiuri Giants | 130 | 66 | 61 | 3 | .519 | 4.5 |
| Osaka Tigers | 130 | 64 | 62 | 4 | .508 | 6.0 |
| Hiroshima Carp | 130 | 62 | 61 | 7 | .504 | 6.5 |
| Chunichi Dragons | 130 | 63 | 67 | 0 | .485 | 9.0 |
| Kokutetsu Swallows | 130 | 54 | 72 | 4 | .431 | 16.0 |

Pacific League regular season standings
| Team | G | W | L | T | Pct. | GB |
|---|---|---|---|---|---|---|
| Daimai Orions | 133 | 82 | 48 | 3 | .631 | — |
| Nankai Hawks | 136 | 78 | 52 | 6 | .600 | 4.0 |
| Nishitetsu Lions | 136 | 70 | 60 | 6 | .538 | 12.0 |
| Hankyu Braves | 136 | 65 | 65 | 6 | .500 | 17.0 |
| Toei Flyers | 132 | 52 | 78 | 2 | .400 | 30.0 |
| Kintetsu Buffaloes | 131 | 43 | 87 | 1 | .331 | 39.0 |

== Postseason ==
=== Japan Series ===
CL Taiyo Whales (4) vs. PL Daimai Orions (0)

| Game | Date | Score | Location | Time | Attendance |
|---|---|---|---|---|---|
| 1 | October 11 | Daimai Orions – 0, Taiyo Whales – 1 | Kawasaki Stadium | 2:12 | 18,354 |
| 2 | October 12 | Daimai Orions – 2, Taiyo Whales – 3 | Kawasaki Stadium | 2:29 | 18,421 |
| 3 | October 14 | Taiyo Whales – 6, Daimai Orions – 5 | Korakuen Stadium | 2:38 | 31,586 |
| 4 | October 15 | Taiyo Whales – 1, Daimai Orions – 0 | Korakuen Stadium | 2:44 | 32,409 |

== League leaders ==
=== Central League ===
Batting leaders
| Stat | Player | Team | Total |
|---|---|---|---|
| Batting average | Shigeo Nagashima | Yomiuri Giants | .334 |
| Home runs | Katsumi Fujimoto | Osaka Tigers | 22 |
| Runs batted in | Katsumi Fujimoto | Osaka Tigers | 76 |
| Runs | Toshio Naka | Chunichi Dragons | 80 |
| Hits | Shigeo Nagashima | Yomiuri Giants | 151 |
| Stolen bases | Toshio Naka | Chunichi Dragons | 50 |

Pitching leaders
| Stat | Player | Team | Total |
|---|---|---|---|
| Wins | Ritsuo Horimoto | Yomiuri Giants | 29 |
| Losses | Masaichi Kaneda | Kokutetsu Swallows | 22 |
| Earned run average | Noboru Akiyama | Taiyo Whales | 1.75 |
| Strikeouts | Masaichi Kaneda | Kokutetsu Swallows | 284 |
| Innings pitched | Ritsuo Horimoto | Yomiuri Giants | 364 2/3 |

=== Pacific League ===
Batting leaders
| Stat | Player | Team | Total |
|---|---|---|---|
| Batting average | Kihachi Enomoto | Daimai Orions | .344 |
| Home runs | Kazuhiro Yamauchi | Daimai Orions | 32 |
| Runs batted in | Kazuhiro Yamauchi | Daimai Orions | 103 |
| Runs | Kihachi Enomoto | Daimai Orions | 94 |
| Hits | Kihachi Enomoto | Daimai Orions | 170 |
| Stolen bases | Chico Barbon | Hankyu Braves | 32 |

Pitching leaders
| Stat | Player | Team | Total |
|---|---|---|---|
| Wins | Shoichi Ono | Daimai Orions | 33 |
| Losses | Masayuki Dobashi | Toei Flyers | 23 |
| Earned run average | Shoichi Ono | Daimai Orions | 1.98 |
| Strikeouts | Tadashi Sugiura | Nankai Hawks | 317 |
| Innings pitched | Tadashi Sugiura | Nankai Hawks | 332 2/3 |

== Awards ==
- Most Valuable Player
  - Noboru Akiyama, Taiyo Whales (CL)
  - Kazuhiro Yamauchi, Daimai Orions (PL)
- Rookie of the Year
  - Ritsuo Horimoto, Yomiuri Giants (CL)
  - No PL recipient
- Eiji Sawamura Award
  - Ritsuo Horimoto, Yomiuri Giants (CL)

Central League Best Nine Award winners
| Position | Player | Team |
|---|---|---|
| Pitcher | Noboru Akiyama | Taiyo Whales |
| Catcher | Kiyoshi Doi | Taiyo Whales |
| First baseman | Kazuhiko Kondo | Taiyo Whales |
| Second baseman | Noboru Inoue | Chunichi Dragons |
| Third baseman | Shigeo Nagashima | Yomiuri Giants |
| Shortstop | Yoshio Yoshida | Osaka Tigers |
| Outfielder | Toru Mori | Chunichi Dragons |
| Outfielder | Teruo Namiki | Osaka Tigers |
| Outfielder | Toshio Naka | Chunichi Dragons |

Pacific League Best Nine Award winners
| Position | Player | Team |
|---|---|---|
| Pitcher | Shoichi Ono | Daimai Orions |
| Catcher | Katsuya Nomura | Nankai Hawks |
| First baseman | Kihachi Enomoto | Daimai Orions |
| Second baseman | Akira Ogi | Nishitetsu Lions |
| Third baseman | Akitoshi Kodama | Kintetsu Buffaloes |
| Shortstop | Yasumitsu Toyoda | Nishitetsu Lions |
| Outfielder | Kazuhiro Yamauchi | Daimai Orions |
| Outfielder | Kenjiro Tamiya | Daimai Orions |
| Outfielder | Isao Harimoto | Toei Flyers |

== See also ==
- 1960 Major League Baseball season
