= 1959 Nippon Professional Baseball season =

1959 NPB season
- League: Nippon Professional Baseball
- Sport: Baseball

Central League pennant
- League champions: Yomiuri Giants
- Runners-up: Osaka Tigers
- Season MVP: Motoshi Fujita (YOM)

Pacific League pennant
- League champions: Nankai Hawks
- Runners-up: Daimai Orions
- Season MVP: Tadashi Sugiura (NAN)

Japan Series
- Champions: Nankai Hawks
- Runners-up: Yomiuri Giants
- Finals MVP: Tadashi Sugiura (NAN)

NPB seasons
- ← 1958 1960 →

The 1959 Nippon Professional Baseball season was the tenth season of operation of Nippon Professional Baseball (NPB).

== Regular season ==
=== Standings ===
Central League regular season standings
Team	G	W	L	T	Pct.	GB
Yomiuri Giants	130	77	48	5	.612	—
Osaka Tigers	130	62	59	9	.512	13.0
Chunichi Dragons	130	64	61	5	.512	13.0
Kokutetsu Swallows	130	63	65	2	.492	15.5
Hiroshima Carp	130	59	64	7	.481	17.0
Taiyo Whales	130	49	77	4	.392	28.5

Pacific League regular season standings
Team	G	W	L	T	Pct.	GB
Nankai Hawks	134	88	42	4	.677	—
Daimai Orions	136	82	48	6	.631	6.0
Toei Flyers	135	67	63	5	.515	21.0
Nishitetsu Lions	144	66	64	14	.508	22.0
Hankyu Braves	134	48	82	4	.369	40.0
Kintetsu Buffaloes	133	39	91	3	.300	49.0

== Postseason ==
=== Japan Series ===
PL Nankai Hawks (4) vs. CL Yomiuri Giants (0)

Game	Date	Score	Location	Time	Attendance
1	October 24	Yomiuri Giants – 7, Nankai Hawks – 10	Osaka Stadium	3:13	30,038
2	October 25	Yomiuri Giants – 3, Nankai Hawks – 6	Osaka Stadium	2:33	30,288
3	October 27	Nankai Hawks – 3, Yomiuri Giants – 2	Korakuen Stadium	2:47	32,056
4	October 29	Nankai Hawks – 3, Yomiuri Giants – 0	Korakuen Stadium	2:23	32,266

== League leaders ==
=== Central League ===
Batting leaders
Stat	Player	Team	Total
Batting average	Shigeo Nagashima	Yomiuri Giants	.334
Home runs	Toru Mori; Takeshi Kuwata	Chunichi Dragons; Taiyo Whales	31
Runs batted in	Toru Mori	Chunichi Dragons	87
Runs	Shigeo Nagashima	Yomiuri Giants	88
Hits	Shigeo Nagashima	Yomiuri Giants	150
Stolen bases	Hiroji Okajima	Chunichi Dragons	41

Pitching leaders
Stat	Player	Team	Total
Wins	Motoshi Fujita	Yomiuri Giants	27
Losses	Noboru Akiyama	Taiyo Whales	22
Earned run average	Minoru Murayama	Osaka Tigers	1.19
Strikeouts	Masaichi Kaneda	Kokutetsu Swallows	313
Innings pitched	Masaaki Koyama	Osaka Tigers	344

=== Pacific League ===
Batting leaders
Stat	Player	Team	Total
Batting average	Kohei Sugiyama	Nankai Hawks	.323
Home runs	Kazuhiro Yamauchi	Daimai Orions	25
Runs batted in	Takao Katsuragi	Daimai Orions	95
Runs	Yoshinori Hirose	Nankai Hawks	86
Hits	Takao Katsuragi	Daimai Orions	163
Stolen bases	Chico Barbon	Hankyu Braves	38

Pitching leaders
Stat	Player	Team	Total
Wins	Tadashi Sugiura	Nankai Hawks	38
Losses	Tetsuya Yoneda	Hankyu Braves	24
Earned run average	Tadashi Sugiura	Nankai Hawks	1.40
Strikeouts	Tadashi Sugiura	Nankai Hawks	336
Innings pitched	Kazuhisa Inao	Nishitetsu Lions	402 1/3

== Awards ==
- Baseball Hall of Fame
  - Matsutaro Shoriki
  - Hiroshi Hiraoka
  - Yukio Aoi
  - Shin Hashido
  - Kiyoshi Oshikawa
  - Jiro Kuji
  - Eiji Sawamura
  - Iso Abe
- Most Valuable Player
  - Motoshi Fujita, Yomiuri Giants (CL)
  - Tadashi Sugiura, Nankai Hawks (PL)
- Rookie of the Year
  - Takeshi Kuwata, Taiyo Whales (CL)
  - Isao Harimoto, Toei Flyers (PL)
- Eiji Sawamura Award
  - Minoru Murayama, Osaka Tigers (CL)

Central League Best Nine Award winners
Position	Player	Team
Pitcher	Motoshi Fujita	Yomiuri Giants
Catcher	Shigeru Fujio	Yomiuri Giants
First baseman	Katsumi Fujimoto	Osaka Tigers
Second baseman	Masataka Tsuchiya	Yomiuri Giants
Third baseman	Shigeo Nagashima	Yomiuri Giants
Shortstop	Yoshio Yoshida	Osaka Tigers
Outfielder	Toru Mori	Chunichi Dragons
Outfielder	Kazuhiko Sakazaki	Yomiuri Giants
Outfielder	Akira Owada	Hiroshima Carp

Pacific League Best Nine Award winners
Position	Player	Team
Pitcher	Tadashi Sugiura	Nankai Hawks
Catcher	Katsuya Nomura	Nankai Hawks
First baseman	Kihachi Enomoto	Daimai Orions
Second baseman	Isami Okamoto	Nankai Hawks
Third baseman	Takao Katsuragi	Daimai Orions
Shortstop	Yasumitsu Toyoda	Nishitetsu Lions
Outfielder	Seiji Sekiguchi	Nishitetsu Lions
Outfielder	Kohei Sugiyama	Nankai Hawks
Outfielder	Teruyuki Takakura	Nishitetsu Lions

== See also ==
- 1959 Major League Baseball season
