= 1959 Japan Series =

| Team (Wins) | Managers | Season |
|---|---|---|
| Nankai Hawks (4) | Kazuto Tsuruoka | 88–42–4 (.677), 6 GA |
| Yomiuri Giants (0) | Shigeru Mizuhara | 77–48–5 (.612), 13 GA |
- Dates: October 24–29
- MVP: Tadashi Sugiura (Nankai)
- FSA: Masataka Tsuchiya (Yomiuri)

The 1959 Japan Series was the championship series of Nippon Professional Baseball (NPB) for the 1959 season. The 10th edition of the Series, it was a best-of-seven playoff that matched the Pacific League champion Nankai Hawks against the Central League champion Yomiuri Giants. The Hawks won in a four-game sweep, which was the first time this had occurred in league history.

== Summary ==
PL Nankai Hawks (4) vs. CL Yomiuri Giants (0)

| Game | Date | Score | Location | Time | Attendance |
|---|---|---|---|---|---|
| 1 | October 24 | Yomiuri Giants – 7, Nankai Hawks – 10 | Osaka Stadium | 3:13 | 30,038 |
| 2 | October 25 | Yomiuri Giants – 3, Nankai Hawks – 6 | Osaka Stadium | 2:33 | 30,288 |
| 3 | October 27 | Nankai Hawks – 3, Yomiuri Giants – 2 | Korakuen Stadium | 2:47 | 32,056 |
| 4 | October 29 | Nankai Hawks – 3, Yomiuri Giants – 0 | Korakuen Stadium | 2:23 | 32,266 |

== Matchups ==
=== Game 1 ===
Saturday, October 24, 1959 – 1:00 pm at Osaka Stadium in Osaka, Osaka Prefecture

| Team | 1 | 2 | 3 | 4 | 5 | 6 | 7 | 8 | 9 | R | H | E |
|---|---|---|---|---|---|---|---|---|---|---|---|---|
| Yomiuri | 0 | 0 | 0 | 0 | 0 | 1 | 2 | 0 | 4 | 7 | 14 | 1 |
| Nankai | 5 | 0 | 1 | 0 | 1 | 0 | 3 | 0 | X | 10 | 19 | 0 |
WP: Tadashi Sugiura (1–0) LP: Taketoshi Yoshihara (0–1); Home runs: YOM: None; NAN: Isami Okamoto 2 (2)

=== Game 2 ===
Sunday, October 25, 1959 – 1:00 pm at Osaka Stadium in Osaka, Osaka Prefecture

| Team | 1 | 2 | 3 | 4 | 5 | 6 | 7 | 8 | 9 | R | H | E |
|---|---|---|---|---|---|---|---|---|---|---|---|---|
| Yomiuri | 2 | 0 | 0 | 0 | 0 | 0 | 1 | 0 | 0 | 3 | 7 | 0 |
| Nankai | 0 | 0 | 0 | 4 | 0 | 2 | 0 | 0 | X | 6 | 10 | 1 |
WP: Tadashi Sugiura (2–0) LP: Motoshi Fujita (0–1); Home runs: YOM: Shigeo Nagashima (1); NAN: None

=== Game 3 ===
Tuesday, October 27, 1959 – 1:00 pm at Korakuen Stadium in Bunkyō, Tokyo

| Team | 1 | 2 | 3 | 4 | 5 | 6 | 7 | 8 | 9 | 10 | R | H | E |
|---|---|---|---|---|---|---|---|---|---|---|---|---|---|
| Nankai | 0 | 2 | 0 | 0 | 0 | 0 | 0 | 0 | 0 | 1 | 3 | 4 | 1 |
| Yomiuri | 1 | 0 | 0 | 0 | 0 | 0 | 0 | 0 | 1 | 0 | 2 | 10 | 0 |
WP: Tadashi Sugiura (3–0) LP: Taketoshi Yoshihara (0–2); Home runs: NAN: Katsuya Nomura (1); YOM: Kazuhiko Sakazaki (1)

=== Game 4 ===
Thursday, October 29, 1959 – 1:00 pm at Korakuen Stadium in Bunkyō, Tokyo

| Team | 1 | 2 | 3 | 4 | 5 | 6 | 7 | 8 | 9 | R | H | E |
|---|---|---|---|---|---|---|---|---|---|---|---|---|
| Nankai | 0 | 0 | 1 | 0 | 0 | 0 | 2 | 0 | 0 | 3 | 6 | 0 |
| Yomiuri | 0 | 0 | 0 | 0 | 0 | 0 | 0 | 0 | 0 | 0 | 5 | 1 |
WP: Tadashi Sugiura (4–0) LP: Motoshi Fujita (0–2)

== See also ==
- 1959 World Series
