= Ritsuo =

- Gender: Male

Origin
- Origin: Japanese
- Meaning: Different meanings depending on the kanji used

Ritsuo (written: 律夫 or 律雄) is a masculine Japanese given name. Notable people with the name include:

- Ritsuo Horimoto (堀本 律雄; 1935–2012), Japanese baseball player
- Ritsuo Hosokawa (細川 律夫; born 1943), Japanese politician
