= Mutsuo Minagawa =

Japanese baseball player (1935–2006)

Mutsuo Minagawa 皆川睦夫
- Pitcher
- Born: July 3, 1935; Yonezawa, Yamagata, Japan
- Died: February 6, 2005 (aged 69); Sakai, Osaka, Japan
- Batted: Right Threw: Right

Japan Pacific League statistics
- Win–loss record: 221–139
- W–L%: .614
- Earned run average: 2.42
- Games pitched Games started: 759; 327
- Complete games Shutouts: 101; 37
- Strikeouts Walks: 1,638; 717
- Innings pitched: 3,158

Teams
- Nankai Hawks (1954–1971)

Career highlights and awards
- 6x All-Star (1957; 1965–1968; 1970); 6x Pennant title (1955; 1959; 1961; 1964–1966); 2x Japan Series championship (1959; 1964); Best Nine Award (1968); 4x W–L% title (1961–1962; 1966; 1968); ERA title (1968); Most wins (1968); Meikyukai Member

Member of the Japanese

Baseball Hall of Fame
- Induction: 2011
- Election method: Experts Division

Mutsuo Minagawa (皆川 睦夫, July 3, 1935 – February 6, 2005) was a Japanese professional baseball pitcher. Listed at 5' 10" [1.82 m], 162 lb. [73 k.], Minagawa batted and threw right handed. He was born in Yonezawa, Yamagata.

A tough three quarters, side arm pitcher, Minagawa spent 18 seasons in the Pacific Coast League during three different decades spanning 1954–1971, all of them with the Nankai Hawks, which is currently known as the Softbank Hawks.

By using a wide array of breaking pitches, his command of sliders and screwballs secured him double-digit victories during 11 seasons, including eight consecutive years from 1956 through 1963.

A six-time All-Star, Minagawa also received Best Nine Award honors and was a member of Hawks teams that won six pennant titles and two Japan Series championships. Overall, he posted a career 221-139 record highlighted by a 31-win season in 1968.

Since then there has been no other pitchers in the Nippon Professional Baseball who won 30 or more games in a regular season.

== Pitching career ==
=== 1950s ===
Minagawa debuted in 1954 with Nankai at age 18 and was used sparingly in his first three seasons, being part of the pitching staff of the 1955 Pacific League pennant winner, even though he did not play in the Japan Series. He improved in 1956, ending with an 11-10 mark, 2.17 ERA and 190 2/3 innings pitched in 60 appearances, starting 16 games and pitching his first career shutout. Then in 1957 he had 23 outings in 56 appearances, winning 18 games while losing 10. In addition, he posted a 2.64 earned run average for the seventh-best of the league, pitched an eight-best 230 2/3 innings, and earned his first All-Star selection.

Afterwards, Minagawa had a breakthrough season in 1958, going 17-8 with a 1.83 ERA in 52 pitching appearances, ending second in the league in ERA and shutouts (6), fourth in win-lost percentage (.680) and eighth in innings. (230 2/3).

But the 1959 season was memorable for Minagawa and the Hawks in many ways. The breaking-ball pitcher played in 51 of the 130 games of his team (39%), amassing a 10-6 record with a 1.92 ERA and 0.947 WHIP in 14 starts and 37 relief appearances, while Nankai contended with the Daimai Orions the Pacific League pennant for most of the summer. Finally, Nankai captured the pennant with a six-game cushion in the standings, claiming the right to face the Yomiuri Giants of the Central League in the Japan Series. And the Hawks prevailed, blanking Yomiuri 4–0 in the best-of-seven series, to clinch its first Japan Series after four failed attempts. Minagawa made a brief relief appearance in the Series, allowing a run in just one inning of work.

=== 1960s ===
Then in 1960, Minagawa went 11-8 with a 2.89 ERA in limited action due to an injury. He rebounded in 1961, running his record to 16-7 with a 1.98 ERA in 51 games as a swingman pitcher, helping the Hawks win a pennant for a third time. Moreover, Minagawa would face again the Yomiuri Giants in the 1961 Japan Series. He then lost a pitcher's duel to Ritsuo Horimoto in Game 2, and was 0-1 with a 2.92 ERA in the tournament, which was won by Yomiuri in six hard-battled games.

Once more, Minagawa would pitch effectively in 1962 with another dominating performance for the second-place Hawks, winning 19 games and losing just four for a respectable .826 W–L%, ranked as the best mark in the league. He also ended third in BB/9 (1.04), fifth in wins and tenth in ERA (2.50), striking out 119 batters and allowing only 33 walks over 212 1/3 innings to complement his efforts.

In 1963 the Hawks came close to winning the pennant, but faded in the stretch and finished in second place five games behind the Toei Flyers. Minagawa pitched well this year, but not enough to propel his team to the title. He went 12-9 with a 2.54 ERA and 1.05 WHIP in 188.0 innings, while appearing in 53 of the 150 games of the Hawks. Nevertheless, he would help his team clinch three pennants in a row from 1964 through 1966 and a second title in the Japan Series.

Minagawa then saw the most time out of the bullpen in 1964, going 7-5 with a 2.91 ERA for the Hawks pennant-winning team. Eventually, Nankai won its Japan Series second title after defeating the Hanshin Tigers in a maximum of seven games. Minagawa was 0-1 in the Series.

In 1965, Minagawa was used mostly as a spot starter, as he opened 18 of his 40 games and hurled two shutouts in the process. Furthermore, he made his second All-Star team. Overall, he had a record of 14-10 with a 264 ERA in 163 2/3 innings, while the Hawks won the pennant title with a lead of 12 games over the Flyers. But Nankai was unable to maintain its winning pace in the Japan Series, falling in five games to Yomiuri.

As a result of his improvement in 1965, Minagawa rejoined the starting rotation in the 1966 season and led the Hawks in wins (18), ERA (2.12), starts (29), complete games (11), shutouts (6) and innings (212.0). Additionally, he topped the league's qualified starters in W–L% (.720), tied for the second in ERA, finished third in shutouts, fifth in wins and tenth in complete games, while earning a third All-Star berth. Nankai claimed the pennant title, four games ahead of the Nishitetsu Lions, but again lost the Japan Series to the Yomiuri Giants in six games. Minagawa was 0-2 with a 4.26 ERA in the Series, losing both Games 4 and 6.

Minagawa went on to have another solid season for the fourth-place Hawks in 1967, going 17-13 with a 2.29 ERA in 45 games and being named for the fourth time to the All-Star Game. His 17 victories ranked him third on the Pacific League list, while his ERA was the fifth-best. He also finished third in starts (35), fifth in complete games (9) and shutouts (3), and seventh in innings (255 2/3).

His most productive season came in 1968, when he posted a 31-10 record with a 1.61 ERA and worked hard to pitch a career-high 351 1/3 innings. Yet Minagawa was thorough. He led the league in wins, ERA, complete games (27), shutouts (8), innings, WHIP (0.905), BB/9 (1.6) and K/BB (3.06). Minagawa also received Best Nine Award honors as the best pitcher in the Pacific League, and made his fourth consecutive All-Star team and fifth overall. Nevertheless, the Hawks finished in second place one game behind the PL champions the Hankyu Braves.

But things changed after that. In 1969 Minagawa thrown only 134 1/3 innings due to arm fatigue. He had a 5-14 record with a 2.61 ERA in 33 games, 20 of them in relief duties, while collecting one shutout and four complete games.

=== 1970s ===
In the 1970 season, Minagawa tried to make a comeback as starter but failed in his effort. He went 9-10 in 27 contests, completing eight of his 24 starts with two shutouts, while posting a 3.79 ERA in 163 2/3 innings of work. Even so, he made his sixth and last appearance in the All-Star Game.

Fittingly, Minagawa ended his career with the Hawks, the team with which he had enjoyed his finest years in the Pacific League. The right-hander pitched his final season in 1971, going 6-5 with a 4.26 in 25 games over 135 1/3 innings. For good measure, in 18 starts he hurled five complete games and logged his 37th career shutout.

Minagawa retired at the age of 35 with 221 wins and 139 losses for a winning percentage of .614, in addition to a 2.42 ERA. He allowed a batting average against of just .215 while facing 12,552 hitters in 3,158.0 innings of work. A notorious ground ball pitcher, he was able to induce double plays and provided solid numbers in hits and home runs allowed per nine innings, recording 7.7 H/9 and 0.6 HR/9, respectively.

== Later years ==
Following his playing retirement, Minagawa served as pitching coach for Yomiuri, Hanshin and the Kintetsu Buffaloes between the 1970s and 1980s. He died from a blood disease in 2005 at a hospital in Sakai, Osaka, at the age of 69.

Minagawa was enshrined into the Japanese Baseball Hall of Fame as part of its 2011 class, along with three-time Triple Crown winner and manager Hiromitsu Ochiai. He is also a distinguished Meikyukai Member.

Even though he was never recognized with an Eiji Sawamura Award, Minagawa is well remembered as the last pitcher in Japanese professional baseball to post 30 wins or more in a single season, as was aforementioned before.
