= Kadota =

Kadota may refer to:

- 9751 Kadota, a main-belt asteroid
- Hiromitsu Kadota (born 1948), a Japanese baseball player
- a common fig cultivar
