= Nippon Professional Baseball Most Valuable Player Award =

Japanese baseball award

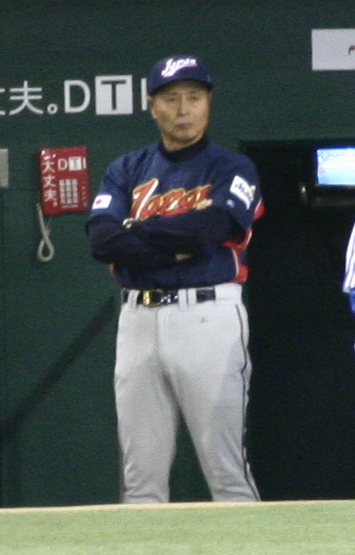
Sadaharu Oh, nine-time winner—more wins than any other player

The Most Valuable Player (MVP) Award (最優秀選手, Saiyūshūsenshu) is an annual Nippon Professional Baseball (NPB) award given to two outstanding players, one each for the Central League (CL) and Pacific League (PL).

Each league's award is voted on by national baseball writers. Each voter selects three players: a first-place selection is given five points, a second-place selection three points, and a third-place selection one point. The award goes to the player who receives the most overall points. The winners are announced every year in November during Nippon Professional Baseball's awards ceremony called NPB Awards.

The first recipient of the award was Eiji Sawamura. The most recent winners, in 2025, are Teruaki Satō, from the Central League's Hanshin Tigers, and Liván Moinelo, from the Pacific League's Fukuoka SoftBank Hawks. In 1940, Victor Starffin became the first player to win the award consecutively and multiple times. Eiji Sawamura and Kazuhisa Inao are the youngest players to receive the awards in 1937 and 1957, respectively, at the ages of 20. In 1988, Hiromitsu Kadota became the oldest player to receive the award at the age of 40.

A majority of the MVP awards were given to players who played on the pennant winning team. There are a few cases where the MVP was awarded to a player who was not on the pennant winning team, however. These include 2 of Oh's MVP seasons in 1964 and 1974, Wladimir Balentien in 2013, Hisashi Iwakuma in 2008, and Hiromitsu Kadota in 1988. Only twice was the award given to a foreigner in both leagues; in 1989 with Ralph Bryant in the Pacific League and Warren Cromartie in the Central League, and in 2001 with Tuffy Rhodes in the Pacific League and Roberto Petagine in the Central League.

== Key ==
Position players	RBIs	Runs batted in
Position players	AVG	Batting average
Pitchers	Record	Record of decisions (tie games are omitted)
Pitchers	Saves	Number of saves^{[B]}
Pitchers	ERA	Earned run average
(#)		Indicates number of times winning MVP Award (if multiple winner)
*		Elected to the Japanese Baseball Hall of Fame

== Winners ==
=== Japanese Baseball League (1937–1949) ===
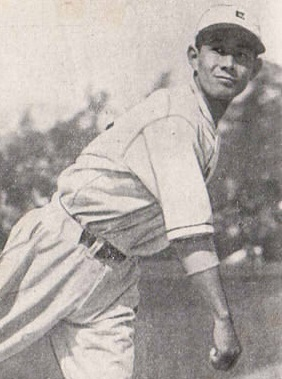
Eiji Sawamura won the first Japanese Baseball League MVP award before NPB was formed in 1950.

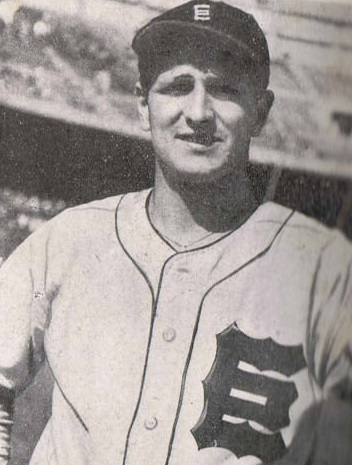
Victor Starffin was the first player to win multiple MVP awards.

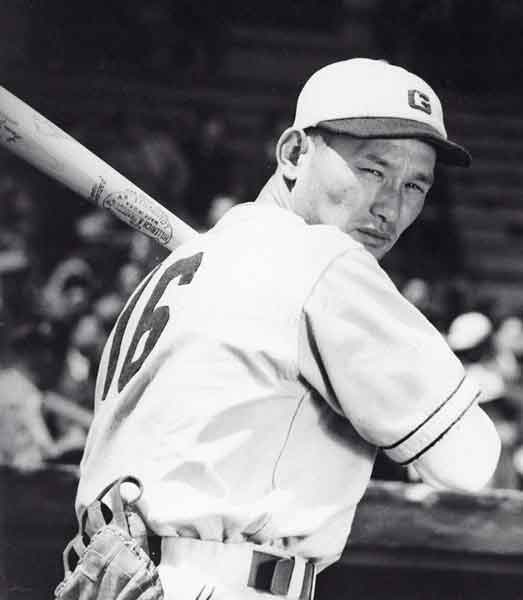
Tetsuharu Kawakami was one of only two players to win the award before and after the formation of NPB.

Season	Player	Team	Position	Selected statistics	Notes
1937 (Spring)	Eiji Sawamura*	Tokyo Kyojin	Pitcher	0.81 earned run average; 196 strikeouts; 24–4 record in 30 appearances (24 games started)	
1937 (Fall)	Harris McGalliard	Korakuen Eagles	Catcher	.310 batting average; 24 runs scored; 17 doubles	
1938 (Spring)	Hisanori Karita*	Tokyo Senators	Second baseman	.299 batting average; 5 home runs; 11 doubles	
1938 (Fall)	Haruyasu Nakajima*	Tokyo Kyojin	Outfielder	.361 batting average; 10 home runs; 38 RBIs	
1939	Victor Starffin*	Tokyo Kyojin	Pitcher	282 strikeouts; 38 complete games; 42–15 record in 68 appearances (41 games started)	
1940	Victor Starffin* (2)	Tokyo Kyojin	Pitcher	0.97 earned run average; 16 shutouts; 38–12 record in 55 appearances (42 games started)	
1941	Tetsuharu Kawakami*	Tokyo Kyojin	First baseman	.310 batting average; 21 doubles; 57 RBIs	
1942	Shigeru Mizuhara*	Tokyo Kyojin	Second baseman	.225 batting average; 10 doubles; 16 RBIs	
1943	Shosei Go*	Tokyo Kyojin	Outfielder	.300 batting average; 68 runs scored; 54 stolen bases	
1944	Tadashi Wakabayashi*	Hanshin Baseball Club	Pitcher	1.56 earned run average; 24 complete games; 22–4 record in 31 appearances (24 games started)	
1945	Season canceled^{[C]}				
1946	Kazuto Tsuruoka*	Great Ring	Infielder	.314 batting average; 95 RBIs; 32 stolen bases	
1947	Tadashi Wakabayashi* (2)	Osaka Tigers	Pitcher	2.09 earned run average; 10 shutouts; 26–12 record in 43 appearances (35 games started)	
1948	Kazuto Tsuruoka* (2)	Nankai Hawks	Third baseman	.305 batting average; 68 RBIs; 23 stolen bases	
1949	Fumio Fujimura*	Osaka Tigers	Third baseman	.332 batting average; 46 home runs; 142 RBIs	

=== Nippon Professional Baseball (1950–present) ===
==== Central League ====
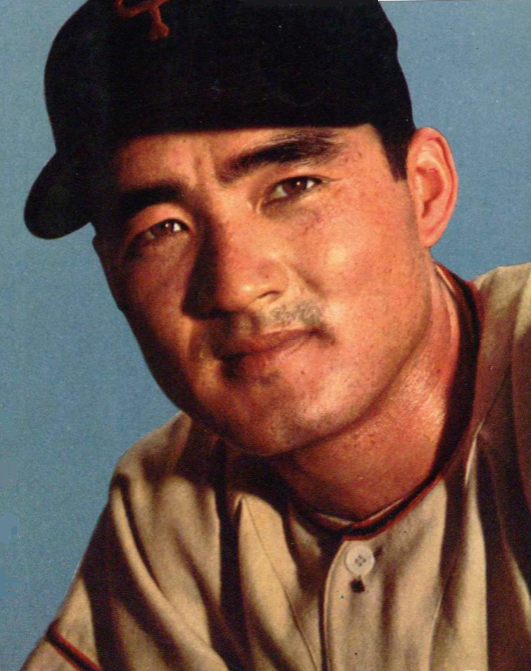
Shigeo Nagashima is one of just three players with five MVP awards.

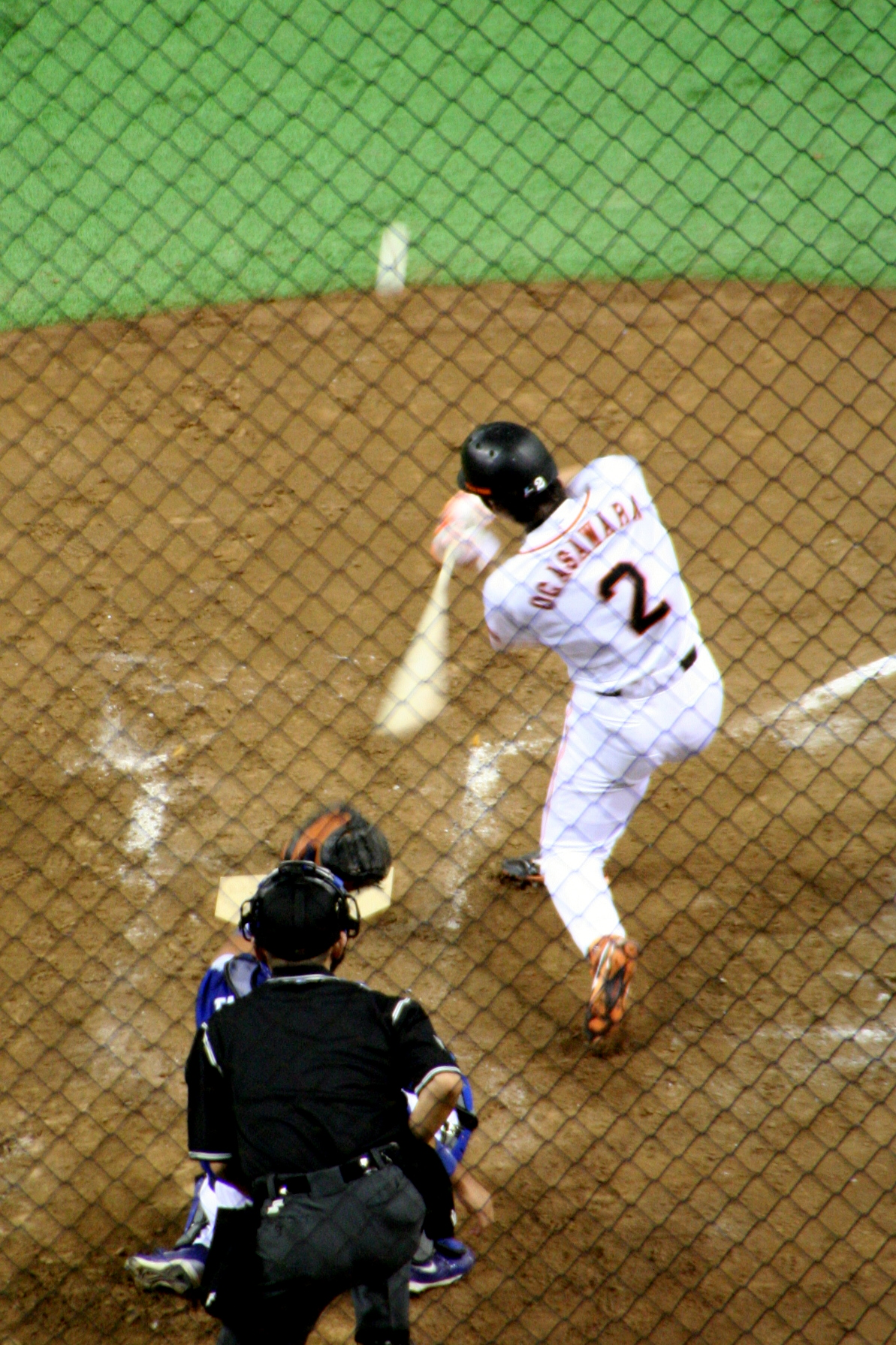
Michihiro Ogasawara is one of only two players to win the award in the Central and Pacific Leagues.

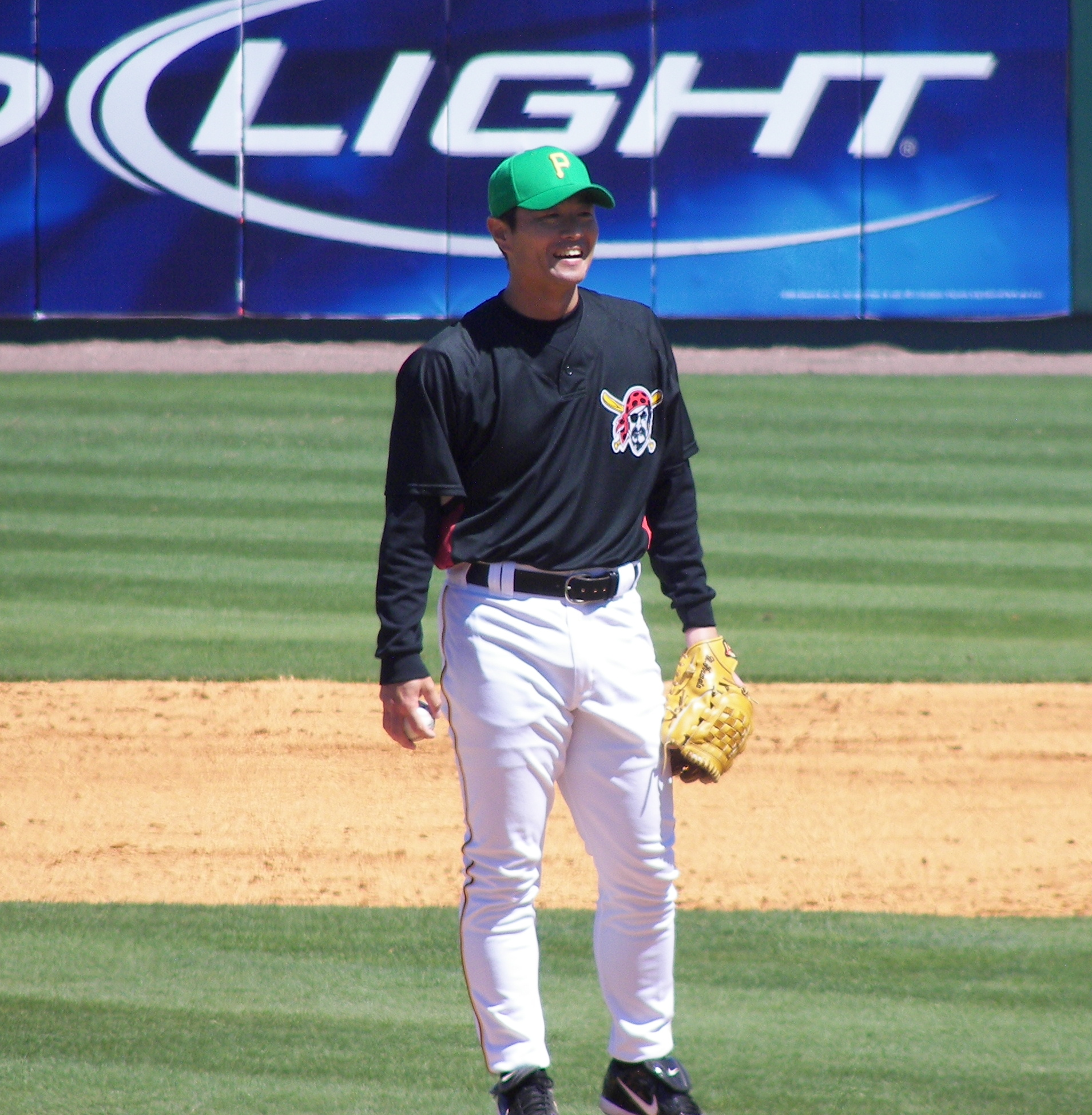
Masumi Kuwata, 1994 CL winner

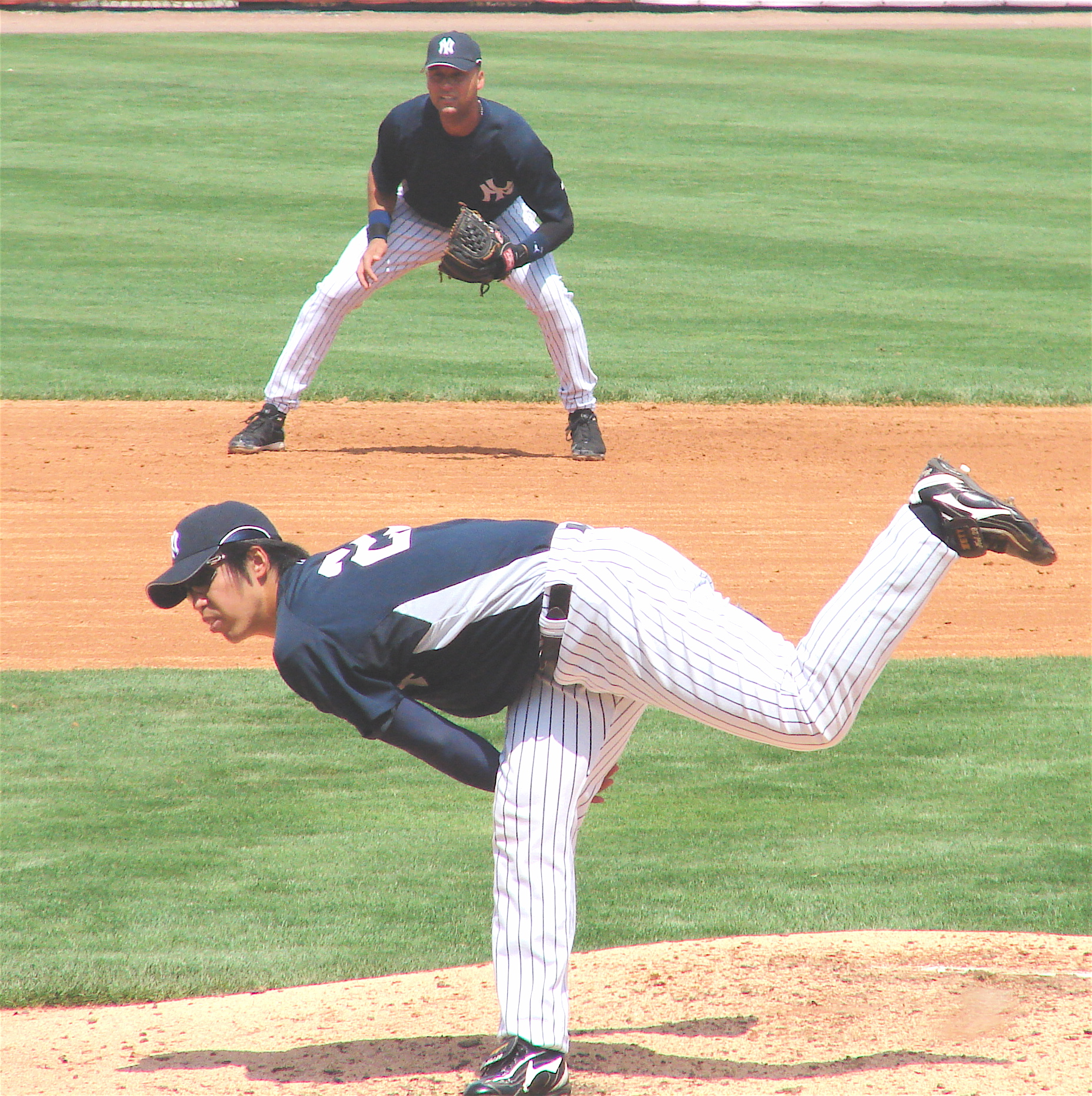
Kei Igawa, 2003 CL winner

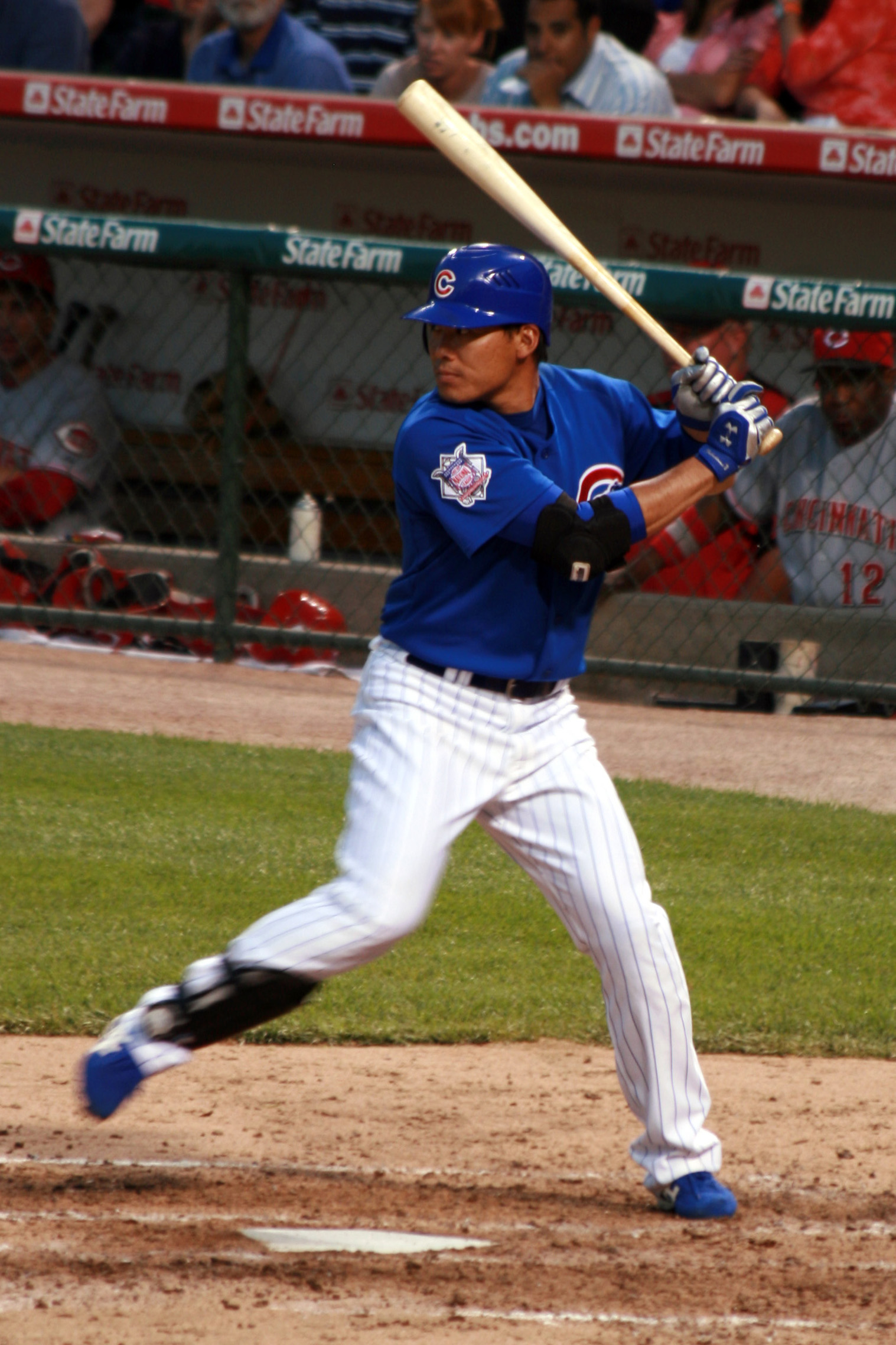
Kosuke Fukudome, 2006 CL winner

Season	Player	Team	Position	Selected statistics	Notes
1950	Makoto Kozuru*	Shochiku Robins	Outfielder	.355 batting average; 51 home runs; 161 RBIs	
1951	Tetsuharu Kawakami* (2)	Yomiuri Giants	First baseman	.377 batting average; 27 doubles; 81 RBIs	
1952	Takehiko Bessho*	Yomiuri Giants	Pitcher	1.94 earned run average; 371 1/3 innings pitched; 33–13 record in 52 appearances (41 games started)	
1953	Takumi Otomo	Yomiuri Giants	Pitcher	1.86 earned run average; 22 complete games; 27–6 record in 43 appearances (29 games started)	
1954	Shigeru Sugishita*	Chunichi Dragons	Pitcher	1.39 earned run average; 395 1/3 innings pitched; 32–12 record in 63 appearances (32 games started)	
1955	Tetsuharu Kawakami* (3)	Yomiuri Giants	First baseman	.338 batting average; 12 home runs; 79 RBIs	
1956	Takehiko Bessho* (2)	Yomiuri Giants	Pitcher	1.93 earned run average; 26 complete games; 27–15 record in 54 appearances (35 games started)	
1957	Wally Yonamine*	Yomiuri Giants	Outfielder	.343 batting average; 12 home runs; 48 RBIs	
1958	Motoshi Fujita*	Yomiuri Giants	Pitcher	1.53 earned run average; 359 innings pitched; 29–13 record in 58 appearances (36 games started)	
1959	Motoshi Fujita* (2)	Yomiuri Giants	Pitcher	1.83 earned run average; 24 complete games; 27–11 record in 55 appearances (35 games started)	
1960	Noboru Akiyama*	Taiyo Whales	Pitcher	1.75 earned run average; 262 1/3 innings pitched; 21–10 record in 59 appearances (26 games started)	
1961	Shigeo Nagashima*	Yomiuri Giants	Third baseman	.353 batting average; 28 home runs; 32 doubles	
1962	Minoru Murayama*	Osaka Tigers	Pitcher	1.20 earned run average; 366 1/3 innings pitched; 25–14 record in 57 appearances (38 games started)	
1963	Shigeo Nagashima* (2)	Yomiuri Giants	Third baseman	.341 batting average; 37 home runs; 112 RBIs	
1964	Sadaharu Oh*	Yomiuri Giants	First baseman	.320 batting average; 55 home runs; 119 RBIs	
1965	Sadaharu Oh* (2)	Yomiuri Giants	First baseman	.322 batting average; 42 home runs; 104 RBIs	
1966	Shigeo Nagashima* (3)	Yomiuri Giants	Third baseman	.344 batting average; 26 home runs; 105 RBIs	
1967	Sadaharu Oh* (3)	Yomiuri Giants	First baseman	.326 batting average; 47 home runs; 108 RBIs	
1968	Shigeo Nagashima* (4)	Yomiuri Giants	Third baseman	.318 batting average; 39 home runs; 125 RBIs	
1969	Sadaharu Oh* (4)	Yomiuri Giants	First baseman	.345 batting average; 44 home runs; 125 RBIs	
1970	Sadaharu Oh* (5)	Yomiuri Giants	First baseman	.325 batting average; 47 home runs; 93 RBIs	
1971	Shigeo Nagashima* (5)	Yomiuri Giants	Third baseman	.320 batting average; 34 home runs; 86 RBIs	
1972	Tsuneo Horiuchi*	Yomiuri Giants	Pitcher	2.91 earned run average; 26 complete games; 26–9 record in 48 appearances (34 games started)	
1973	Sadaharu Oh* (6)	Yomiuri Giants	First baseman	.355 batting average; 51 home runs; 114 RBIs	
1974	Sadaharu Oh* (7)	Yomiuri Giants	First baseman	.332 batting average; 49 home runs; 107 RBIs	
1975	Koji Yamamoto*	Hiroshima Toyo Carp	Outfielder	.319 batting average; 86 runs scored; 84 RBIs	
1976	Sadaharu Oh* (8)	Yomiuri Giants	First baseman	.325 batting average; 49 home runs; 123 RBIs	
1977	Sadaharu Oh* (9)	Yomiuri Giants	First baseman	.324 batting average; 50 home runs; 124 RBIs	
1978	Tsutomu Wakamatsu*	Yakult Swallows	Outfielder	.341 batting average; 100 runs scored; 71 RBIs	
1979	Yutaka Enatsu	Hiroshima Toyo Carp	Relief pitcher	2.67 earned run average; 22 saves; 9–5 record in 55 appearances	
1980	Koji Yamamoto* (2)	Hiroshima Toyo Carp	Outfielder	.336 batting average; 44 home runs; 112 RBIs	
1981	Suguru Egawa	Yomiuri Giants	Starting pitcher	2.28 earned run average; 20 complete games; 20–6 record in 31 appearances (30 games started)	
1982	Takayoshi Nakao	Chunichi Dragons	Catcher	.282 batting average; 18 home runs; 47 RBIs	
1983	Tatsunori Hara*	Yomiuri Giants	Third baseman	.302 batting average; 32 home runs; 103 RBIs	
1984	Sachio Kinugasa*	Hiroshima Toyo Carp	Infielder	.329 batting average; 31 home runs; 102 RBIs	
1985	Randy Bass*	Hanshin Tigers	First baseman	.350 batting average; 54 home runs; 134 RBIs	
1986	Manabu Kitabeppu*	Hiroshima Toyo Carp	Starting pitcher	2.43 earned run average; 17 complete games; 18–4 record in 30 games started	
1987	Kazuhiro Yamakura	Yomiuri Giants	Catcher	.273 batting average; 22 home runs; 66 RBIs	
1988	Genji Kaku	Chunichi Dragons	Relief pitcher	1.95 earned run average; 37 saves; 7–6 record in 61 appearances	
1989	Warren Cromartie	Yomiuri Giants	Outfielder	.378 batting average; 72 RBIs; 33 doubles	
1990	Masaki Saito*	Yomiuri Giants	Starting pitcher	2.17 earned run average; 19 complete games; 20–5 record in 27 games started	
1991	Shinji Sasaoka	Hiroshima Toyo Carp	Starting pitcher	2.44 earned run average; 240 innings pitched; 17–9 record in 33 appearances (31 games started)	
1992	Jack Howell	Yakult Swallows	Third baseman	.331 batting average; 87 RBIs; 38 home runs	
1993	Atsuya Furuta*	Yakult Swallows	Catcher	.308 batting average; 64.4 caught stealing percentage; 90 runs scored	
1994	Masumi Kuwata	Yomiuri Giants	Starting pitcher	2.52 earned run average; 185 strikeouts; 14–11 record in 28 appearances (27 games started)	
1995	Tom O'Malley	Yakult Swallows	First baseman	.302 batting average; 31 home runs; 87 RBIs	
1996	Hideki Matsui*	Yomiuri Giants	Outfielder	.314 batting average; 38 home runs; 97 runs scored	
1997	Atsuya Furuta* (2)	Yakult Swallows	Catcher	.322 batting average; 32 doubles; 86 RBIs	
1998	Kazuhiro Sasaki*	Yokohama BayStars	Relief pitcher	0.64 earned run average; 45 saves; 1–1 record in 51 appearances	
1999	Shigeki Noguchi	Chunichi Dragons	Starting pitcher	2.65 earned run average; 203 2/3 innings pitched; 19–7 record in 29 games started	
2000	Hideki Matsui* (2)	Yomiuri Giants	Outfielder	.316 batting average; 42 home runs; 108 RBIs	
2001	Roberto Petagine	Yakult Swallows	First baseman	.322 batting average; 39 home runs; 127 RBIs	
2002	Hideki Matsui* (3)	Yomiuri Giants	Outfielder	.334 batting average; 50 home runs; 107 RBIs	
2003	Kei Igawa	Hanshin Tigers	Starting pitcher	2.80 earned run average; 206 innings pitched; 20–5 record in 29 games started	
2004	Kenshin Kawakami	Chunichi Dragons	Starting pitcher	3.32 earned run average; 192 1/3 innings pitched; 17–7 record in 27 games started	
2005	Tomoaki Kanemoto*	Hanshin Tigers	Outfielder	.327 batting average; 40 home runs; 120 runs scored	
2006	Kosuke Fukudome	Chunichi Dragons	Outfielder	.351 batting average; 47 doubles; 117 runs scored	
2007	Michihiro Ogasawara (2)	Yomiuri Giants	Third baseman	.313 batting average; 31 home runs; 95 runs scored	
2008	Alex Ramírez	Yomiuri Giants	Outfielder	.319 batting average; 45 home runs; 125 RBIs	
2009	Alex Ramírez (2)	Yomiuri Giants	Outfielder	.322 batting average; 31 home runs; 103 RBIs	
2010	Kazuhiro Wada	Chunichi Dragons	Outfielder	.339 batting average; 37 home runs; 93 RBIs	
2011	Takuya Asao	Chunichi Dragons	Relief pitcher	0.41 earned run average; 45 holds; 7–2 record in 79 appearances	
2012	Shinnosuke Abe	Yomiuri Giants	Catcher	.340 batting average; 27 home runs; 104 RBIs	
2013	Wladimir Balentien	Tokyo Yakult Swallows	Outfielder	.330 batting average; 60 home runs; 131 RBIs	
2014	Tomoyuki Sugano	Yomiuri Giants	Starting pitcher	2.33 earned run average; 122 strikeouts; 12–5 record in 23 games started	
2015	Tetsuto Yamada	Tokyo Yakult Swallows	Second baseman	.329 batting average; 38 home runs; 34 stolen bases	
2016	Takahiro Arai	Hiroshima Toyo Carp	First baseman	.300 batting average; 19 home runs; 101 RBIs	
2017	Yoshihiro Maru	Hiroshima Toyo Carp	Outfielder	.308 batting average; 109 runs scored; 92 RBIs	
2018	Yoshihiro Maru (2)	Hiroshima Toyo Carp	Outfielder	.306 batting average; 39 home runs; 97 RBIs	
2019	Hayato Sakamoto	Yomiuri Giants	Shortstop	.312 batting average; 40 home runs; 94 RBIs	
2020	Tomoyuki Sugano (2)	Yomiuri Giants	Pitcher	14 wins; 1.97 ERA; 131 strikeouts	
2021	Munetaka Murakami	Tokyo Yakult Swallows	Third baseman	39 HR; 112 RBI; 106 BB	
2022	Munetaka Murakami (2)	Tokyo Yakult Swallows	Third baseman	56 HR; 134 RBI; .458 OBP	
2023	Shōki Murakami	Hanshin Tigers	Pitcher	10 wins; 1.75 ERA; 137 strikeouts	
2024	Tomoyuki Sugano (3)	Yomiuri Giants	Pitcher	15 wins; 1.67 ERA; 111 strikeouts	
2025	Teruaki Sato	Hanshin Tigers	Third baseman	40 HR; 102 RBI; .924 OPS	

==== Pacific League ====
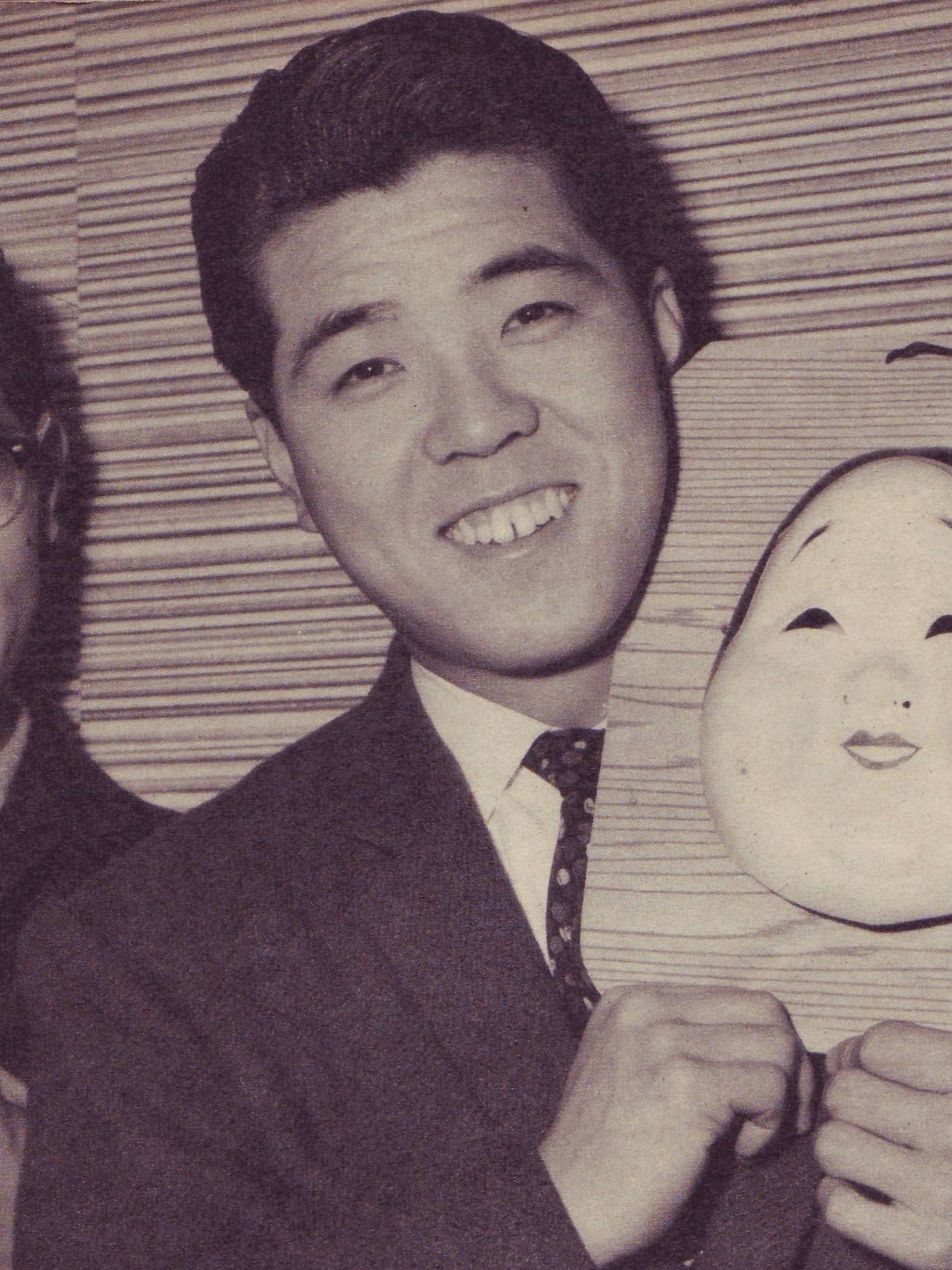
Katsuya Nomura is the only player to win the PL MVP award five times and one of just three NPB players with five MVPs

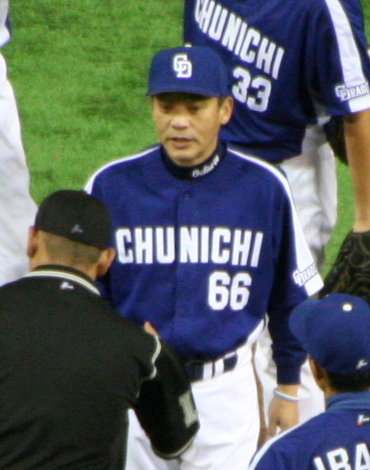
Hiromitsu Ochiai, two-time PL winner

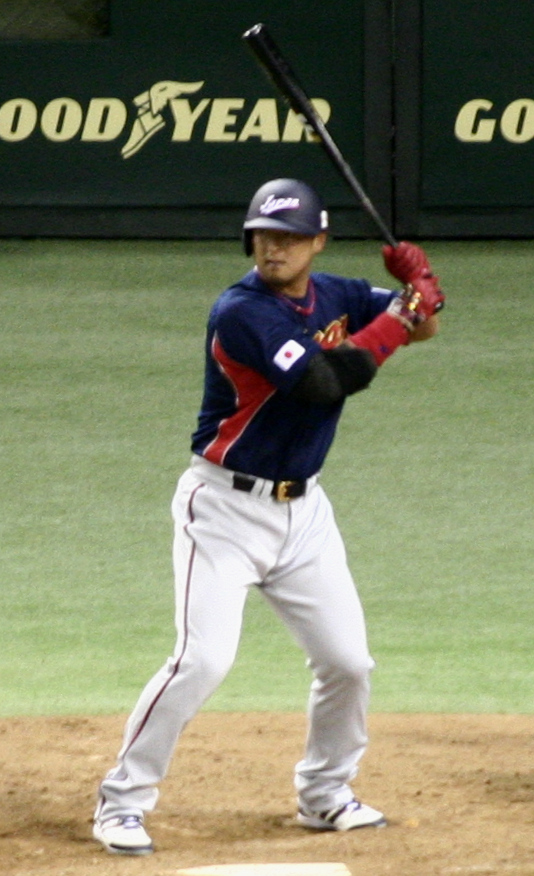
Nobuhiko Matsunaka, two-time PL winner

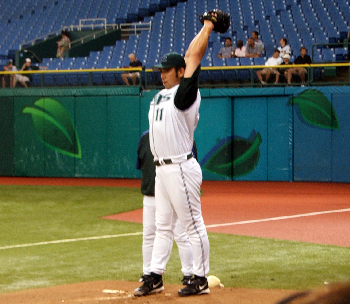
Hideo Nomo, 1990 PL winner

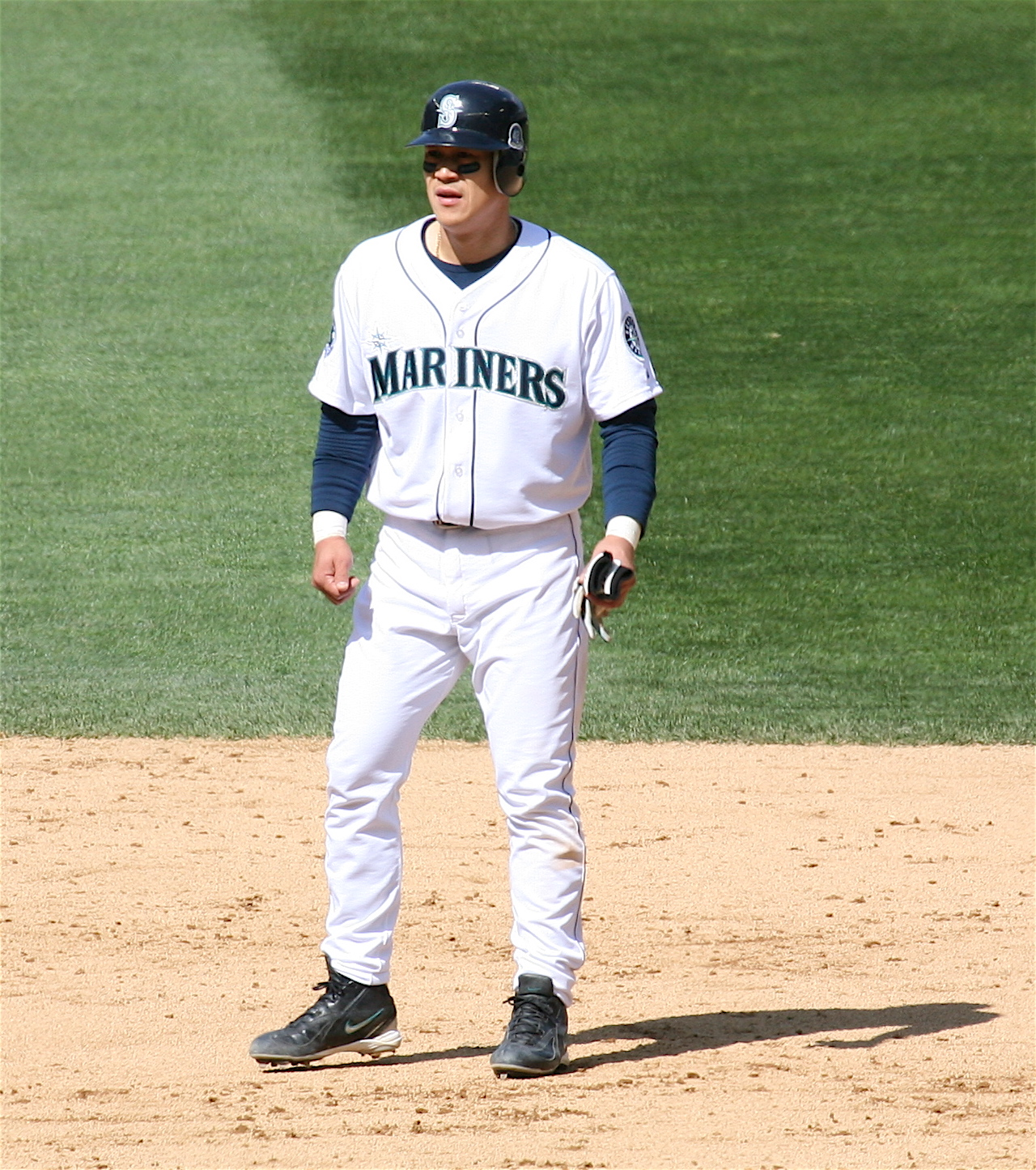
Kenji Johjima, 2003 PL winner

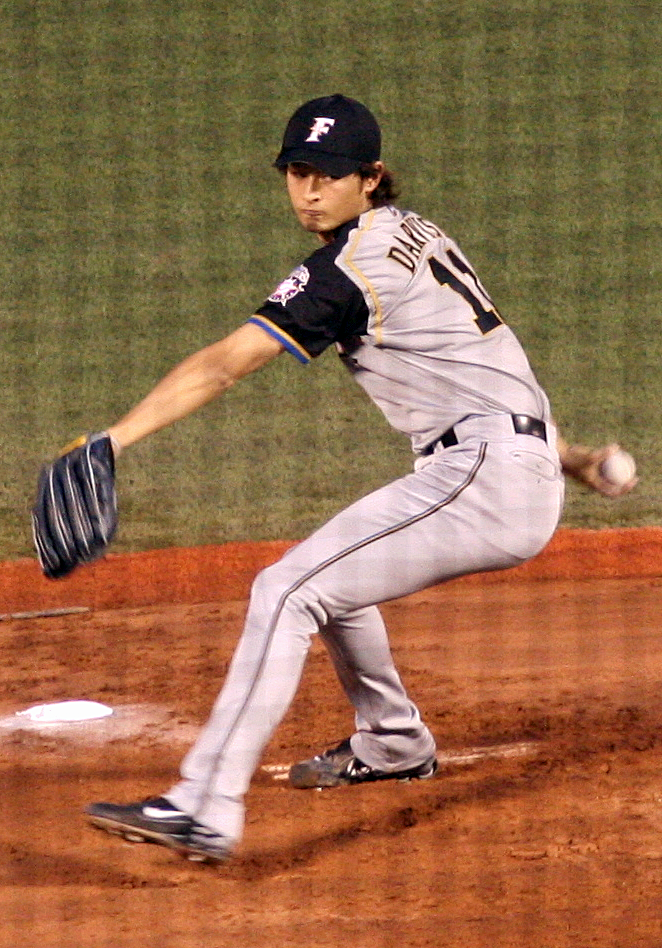
Yu Darvish, 2007 PL winner

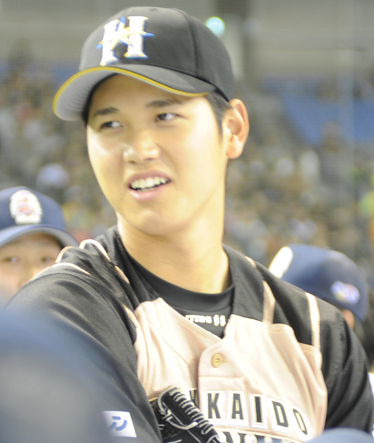
Shohei Ohtani, 2016 PL winner

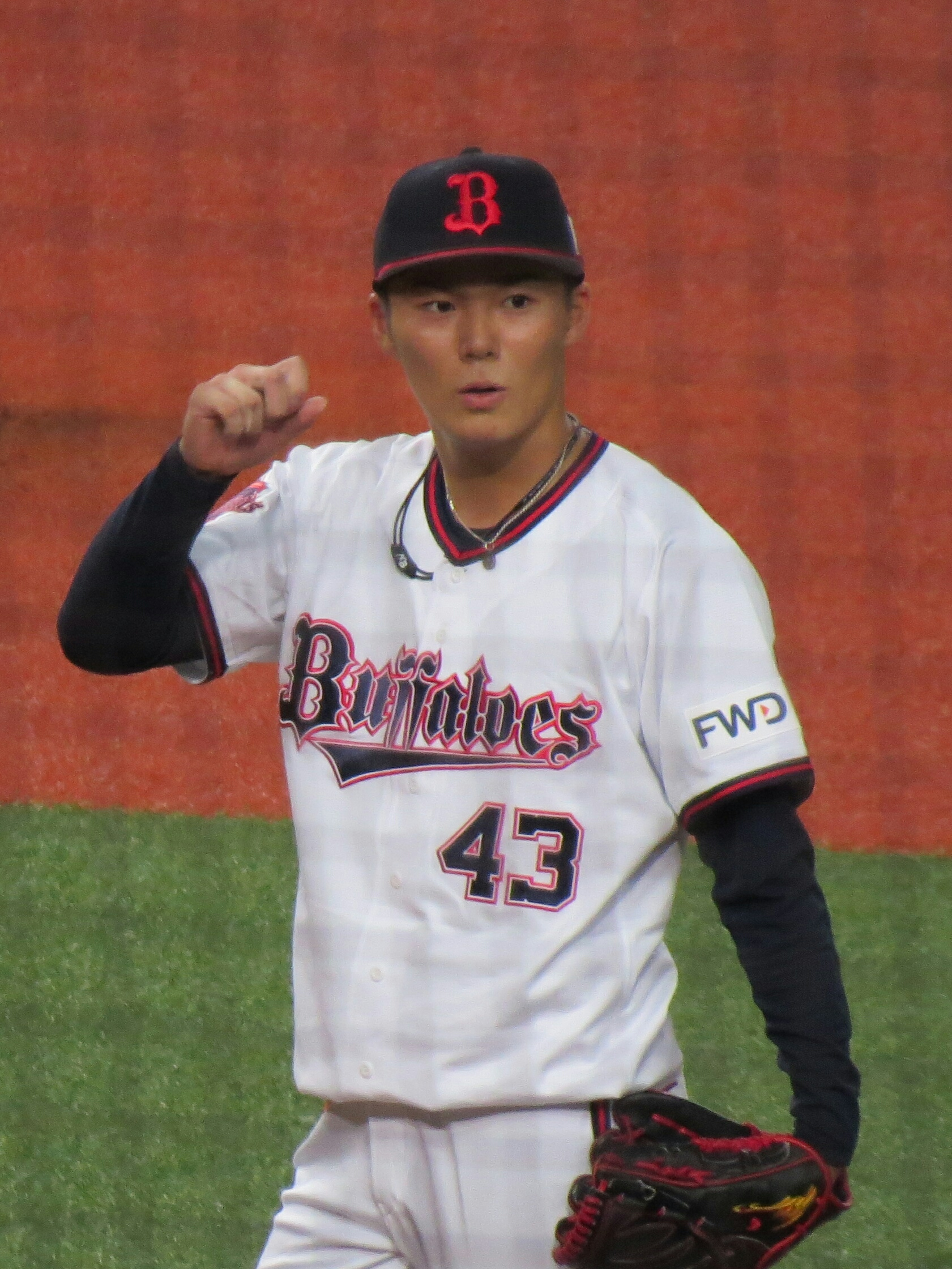
Yoshinobu Yamamoto won the MVP award for three consecutive years (2021-2023) before moving to the MLB's Los Angeles Dodgers.

Season	Player	Team	Position	Selected statistics	Notes
1950	Kaoru Betto*	Mainichi Orions	Outfielder	.335 batting average; 43 home runs; 105 RBIs	
1951	Kazuto Tsuruoka* (3)	Nankai Hawks	Second baseman	.311 batting average; 21 doubles; 58 RBIs	
1952	Susumu Yuki	Nankai Hawks	Pitcher	1.91 earned run average; 104 strikeouts; 19–7 record in 40 appearances (17 games started)	
1953	Isami Okamoto	Nankai Hawks	Second baseman	.318 batting average; 19 home runs; 77 RBIs	
1954	Hiroshi Oshita*	Nishitetsu Lions	Outfielder	.321 batting average; 22 home runs; 88 RBIs	
1955	Tokuji Iida*	Nankai Hawks	Outfielder	.310 batting average; 42 stolen bases; 75 RBIs	
1956	Futoshi Nakanishi*	Nishitetsu Lions	Third baseman	.325 batting average; 29 home runs; 95 RBIs	
1957	Kazuhisa Inao*	Nishitetsu Lions	Pitcher	1.37 earned run average; 373 2/3 innings pitched; 35–6 record in 68 appearances (33 games started)	
1958	Kazuhisa Inao* (2)	Nishitetsu Lions	Pitcher	1.42 earned run average; 373 innings pitched; 33–10 record in 72 appearances (31 games started)	
1959	Tadashi Sugiura*	Nankai Hawks	Pitcher	1.40 earned run average; 336 strikeouts; 38–4 record in 69 appearances (35 games started)	
1960	Kazuhiro Yamauchi*	Daimai Orions	Outfielder	.313 batting average; 32 home runs; 103 RBIs	
1961	Katsuya Nomura*	Nankai Hawks	Catcher	.296 batting average; 29 home runs; 89 RBIs	
1962	Isao Harimoto*	Toei Flyers	Outfielder	.333 batting average; 31 home runs; 99 RBIs	
1963	Katsuya Nomura* (2)	Nankai Hawks	Catcher	.291 batting average; 52 home runs; 135 RBIs	
1964	Joe Stanka	Nankai Hawks	Pitcher	2.40 earned run average; 172 strikeouts; 26–7 record in 47 appearances (43 games started)	
1965	Katsuya Nomura* (3)	Nankai Hawks	Catcher	.320 batting average; 42 home runs; 110 RBIs	
1966	Katsuya Nomura* (4)	Nankai Hawks	Catcher	.312 batting average; 34 home runs; 97 RBIs	
1967	Mitsuhiro Adachi	Hankyu Braves	Pitcher	1.75 earned run average; 17 complete games; 20–10 record in 43 appearances (29 games started)	
1968	Tetsuya Yoneda*	Hankyu Braves	Pitcher	2.79 earned run average; 22 complete games; 29–13 record in 63 appearances (43 games started)	
1969	Tokuji Nagaike	Hankyu Braves	Outfielder	.316 batting average; 41 home runs; 101 RBIs	
1970	Masaaki Kitaru	Lotte Orions	Pitcher	2.53 earned run average; 20 complete games; 21–10 record in 42 appearances (35 games started)	
1971	Tokuji Nagaike (2)	Hankyu Braves	Outfielder	.317 batting average; 40 home runs; 114 RBIs	
1972	Yutaka Fukumoto*	Hankyu Braves	Outfielder	.301 batting average; 106 stolen bases; 99 runs	
1973	Katsuya Nomura* (5)	Nankai Hawks	Catcher	.309 batting average; 28 stolen bases; 96 RBIs	
1974	Tomehiro Kaneda	Lotte Orions	Pitcher	2.90 earned run average; 138 strikeouts; 16–7 record in 36 appearances (29 games started)	
1975	Hideji Kato	Hankyu Braves	First baseman	.309 batting average; 32 home runs; 97 RBIs	
1976	Hisashi Yamada*	Hankyu Braves	Pitcher	2.39 earned run average; 23 complete games; 26–7 record in 39 appearances (27 games started)	
1977	Hisashi Yamada* (2)	Hankyu Braves	Pitcher	2.28 earned run average; 20 complete games; 16–10 record in 44 appearances (25 games started)	
1978	Hisashi Yamada* (3)	Hankyu Braves	Pitcher	2.66 earned run average; 20 complete games; 18–4 record in 35 appearances (25 games started)	
1979	Charlie Manuel	Kintetsu Buffaloes	Outfielder	.324 batting average; 37 home runs; 94 RBIs	
1980	Isamu Kida	Nippon Ham Fighters	Pitcher	2.28 earned run average; 225 strikeouts; 22–8 record in 40 appearances (26 games started)	
1981	Yutaka Enatsu (2)	Nippon Ham Fighters	Pitcher	2.82 earned run average; 25 saves; 3–6 record in 45 appearances	
1982	Hiromitsu Ochiai*	Lotte Orions	Second baseman	.325 batting average; 32 home runs; 99 RBIs	
1983	Osamu Higashio*	Seibu Lions	Pitcher	2.92 earned run average; 213 innings pitched; 18–9 record in 32 appearances (29 games started)	
1984	Greg Wells	Hankyu Braves	First baseman	.355 batting average; 37 home runs; 130 RBIs	
1985	Hiromitsu Ochiai* (2)	Lotte Orions	Infielder	.367 batting average; 52 home runs; 146 RBIs	
1986	Hiromichi Ishige	Seibu Lions	Shortstop	.329 batting average; 91 runs; 27 home runs	
1987	Osamu Higashio* (2)	Seibu Lions	Starting pitcher	3.27 earned run average; 17 complete games; 15–9 record in 28 appearances (27 games started)	
1988	Hiromitsu Kadota*	Nankai Hawks	Outfielder	.311 batting average; 44 home runs; 125 RBIs	
1989	Ralph Bryant	Kintetsu Buffaloes	Outfielder	.283 batting average; 49 home runs; 121 RBIs	
1990	Hideo Nomo*	Kintetsu Buffaloes	Starting pitcher	2.91 earned run average; 235 innings pitched; 18–8 record in 29 appearances (27 games started)	
1991	Taigen Kaku	Seibu Lions	Starting pitcher	2.59 earned run average; 12 complete games; 15–6 record in 24 appearances (23 games started)	
1992	Takehiro Ishii	Seibu Lions	Pitcher	1.94 earned run average; 148 1/3 innings pitched; 15–3 record in 27 appearances (19 games started)	
1993	Kimiyasu Kudo*	Seibu Lions	Starting pitcher	2.06 earned run average; 170 innings pitched; 15–3 record in 24 appearances (23 games started)	
1994	Ichiro Suzuki*	Orix BlueWave	Outfielder	.385 batting average; 41 doubles; 111 runs	
1995	Ichiro Suzuki* (2)	Orix BlueWave	Outfielder	.342 batting average; 49 stolen bases; 104 runs	
1996	Ichiro Suzuki* (3)	Orix BlueWave	Outfielder	.356 batting average; 35 stolen bases; 104 runs	
1997	Fumiya Nishiguchi	Seibu Lions	Pitcher	3.12 earned run average; 207 2/3 innings pitched; 15–5 record in 32 appearances (26 games started)	
1998	Kazuo Matsui	Seibu Lions	Shortstop	.311 batting average; 92 runs; 38 doubles	
1999	Kimiyasu Kudo* (2)	Fukuoka Daiei Hawks	Starting pitcher	2.38 earned run average; 196 1/3 innings pitched; 11–7 record in 26 games started	
2000	Nobuhiko Matsunaka	Fukuoka Daiei Hawks	First baseman	.312 batting average; 33 home runs; 106 RBIs	
2001	Tuffy Rhodes	Osaka Kintetsu Buffaloes	Outfielder	.327 batting average; 55 home runs; 137 runs	
2002	Alex Cabrera	Seibu Lions	First baseman	.336 batting average; 55 home runs; 115 RBIs	
2003	Kenji Johjima	Fukuoka Daiei Hawks	Catcher	.330 batting average; 34 home runs; 119 RBIs	
2004	Nobuhiko Matsunaka (2)	Fukuoka Daiei Hawks	First baseman	.358 batting average; 44 home runs; 120 RBIs	
2005	Toshiya Sugiuchi	Fukuoka SoftBank Hawks	Starting pitcher	2.11 earned run average; 218 strikeouts; 18–4 record in 26 games started	
2006	Michihiro Ogasawara	Hokkaido Nippon-Ham Fighters	First baseman	.313 batting average; 32 home runs; 100 RBIs	
2007	Yu Darvish	Hokkaido Nippon-Ham Fighters	Starting pitcher	1.82 earned run average; 210 strikeouts; 15–5 record in 26 games started	
2008	Hisashi Iwakuma	Tohoku Rakuten Golden Eagles	Starting pitcher	1.87 earned run average; 201 2/3 innings pitched; 21–4 record in 28 games started	
2009	Yu Darvish (2)	Hokkaido Nippon-Ham Fighters	Pitcher	1.73 earned run average; 8 complete games; 15–5 record in 23 games started	
2010	Tsuyoshi Wada	Fukuoka SoftBank Hawks	Starting pitcher	3.14 earned run average; 169 strikeouts; 17–8 record in 26 games started	
2011	Seiichi Uchikawa	Fukuoka SoftBank Hawks	First baseman	.338 batting average; 12 home runs; 74 RBIs	
2012	Mitsuo Yoshikawa	Hokkaido Nippon-Ham Fighters	Starting pitcher	1.71 earned run average; 158 strikeouts; 14–5 record in 25 games started	
2013	Masahiro Tanaka	Tohoku Rakuten Golden Eagles	Starting pitcher	1.71 earned run average; 212 innings pitched; 24–0 record in 28 appearances (27 games started)	
2014	Chihiro Kaneko	Orix Buffaloes	Pitcher	1.98 earned run average; 199 strikeouts; 16–5 record in 26 games started	
2015	Yuki Yanagita	Fukuoka SoftBank Hawks	Outfielder	.363 batting average; 34 home runs; 110 runs	
2016	Shohei Ohtani	Hokkaido Nippon-Ham Fighters	Starting pitcher/Designated hitter	.322 batting average; 1.86 earned run average; 10–4 record in 21 appearances (20 games started)	
2017	Dennis Sarfate	Fukuoka SoftBank Hawks	Pitcher	1.09 earned run average; 54 saves; 2–2 record in 66 appearances	
2018	Hotaka Yamakawa	Saitama Seibu Lions	First baseman	.281 batting average; 47 home runs; 124 RBIs	
2019	Tomoya Mori	Saitama Seibu Lions	Catcher	.329 batting average; 23 home runs; 105 RBIs	
2020	Yuki Yanagita (2)	Fukuoka SoftBank Hawks	Outfielder	.342 batting average; 29 home runs; 86 RBIs	
2021	Yoshinobu Yamamoto	Orix Buffaloes	Pitcher	18–5 record; 206 K; 193.2 IP; 1.39 ERA	
2022	Yoshinobu Yamamoto (2)	Orix Buffaloes	Pitcher	15–5 record; 193 IP; 1.68 ERA	
2023	Yoshinobu Yamamoto (3)	Orix Buffaloes	Pitcher	16-6 record; 164 IP; 1.69 ERA	
2024	Kensuke Kondoh	Fukuoka SoftBank Hawks	Outfielder	.314 batting average; 19 HR; 72 RBI	
2025	Liván Moinelo	Fukuoka SoftBank Hawks	Starting pitcher	12–3 record; 172 K; 1.46 ERA	

=== Multiple winners ===
There have been 22 players who have won the award multiple times. Sadaharu Oh currently holds the record for the most awards won, with nine. Hisashi Yamada (1976–1978) and Ichiro Suzuki (1994–1996) share the record for the most consecutive awards won. Yutaka Enatsu and Michihiro Ogasawara are the only players to have won the award in both the Central League and Pacific League. Alex Ramírez is the only non-Japanese player receive the award multiple times after the formation of two league system.

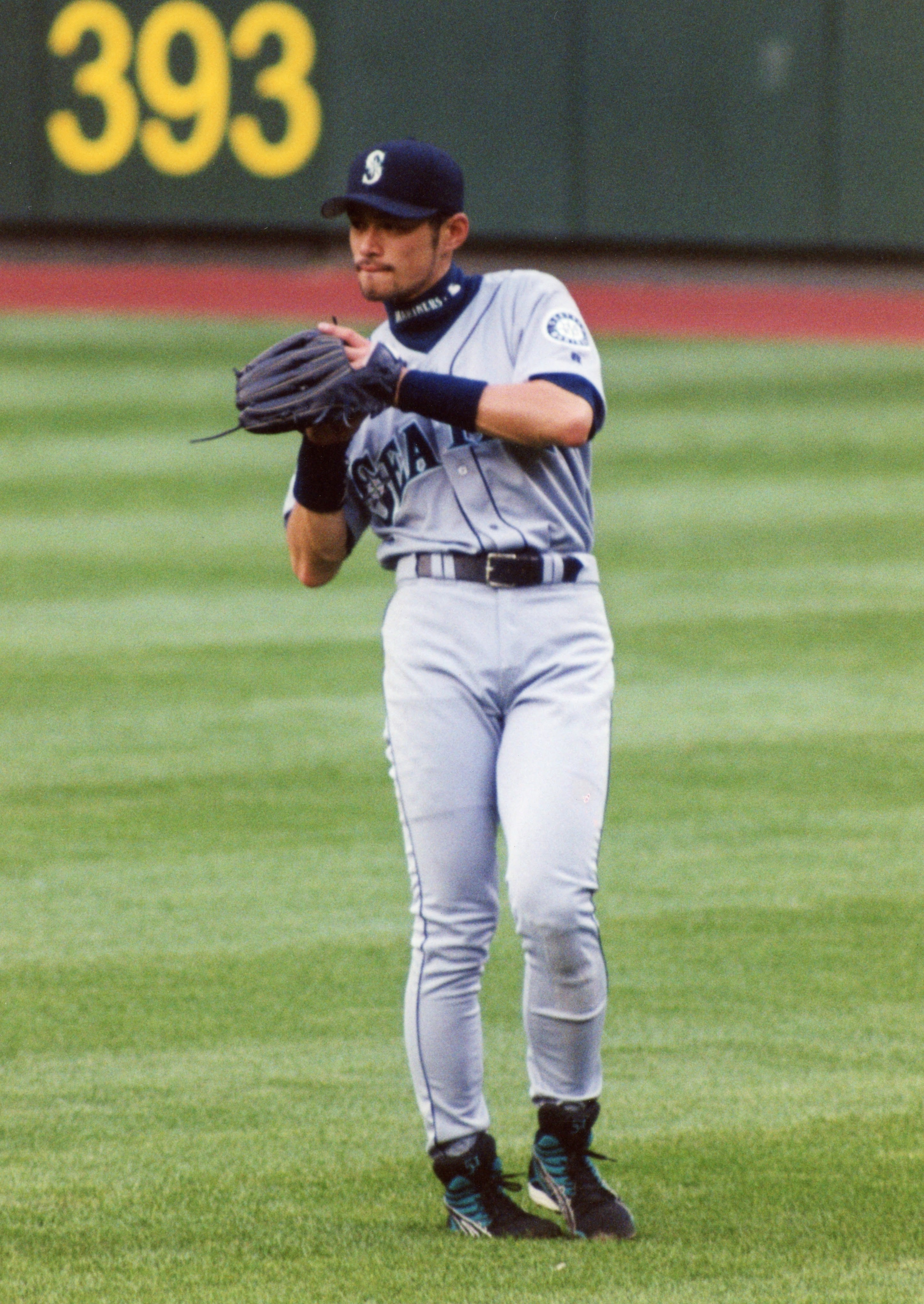
Ichiro Suzuki, three-time consecutive winner

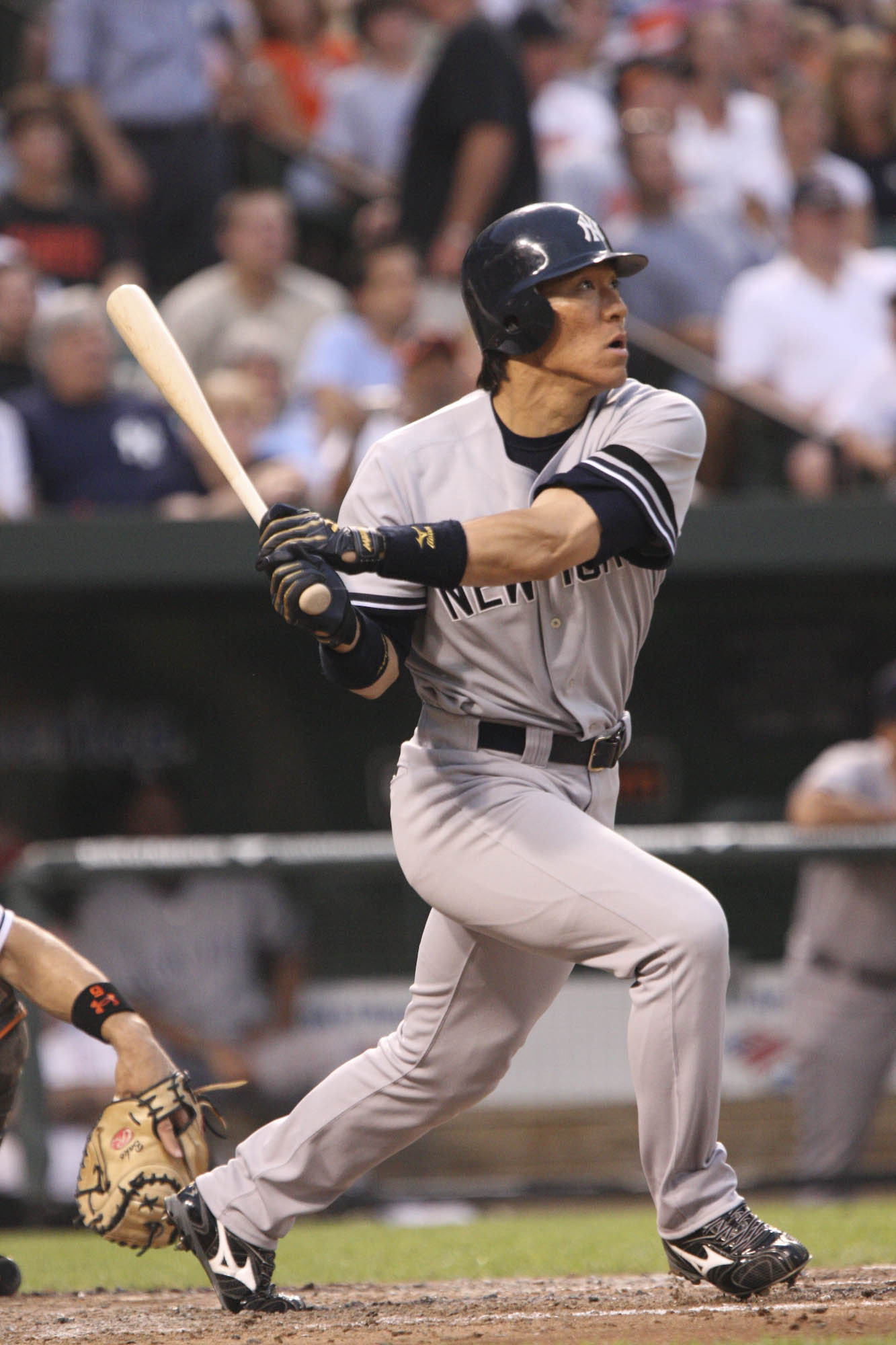
Hideki Matsui, three-time winner

Player	League	# of Awards	Seasons
Sadaharu Oh*	Central	9	1964, 1965, 1967, 1969, 1970, 1973, 1974, 1976, 1977
Shigeo Nagashima*	Central	5	1961, 1963, 1966, 1968, 1971
Katsuya Nomura*	Pacific	5	1961, 1963, 1965, 1966, 1973
Kazuto Yamamoto*	JBL/Pacific^{[D]}	3	1946, 1948, 1951
Tetsuharu Kawakami*	JBL/Central^{[E]}	3	1941, 1951, 1955
Hisashi Yamada*	Pacific	3	1976, 1977, 1978
Ichiro Suzuki	Pacific	3	1994, 1995, 1996
Hideki Matsui	Central	3	1996, 2000, 2002
Tomoyuki Sugano	Central	3	2014, 2020, 2024
Yoshinobu Yamamoto	Pacific	3	2021, 2022, 2023
Victor Starffin*	JBL	2	1939, 1940
Tadashi Wakabayashi*	JBL	2	1944, 1947
Takehiko Bessho*	Central	2	1952, 1956
Kazuhisa Inao*	Pacific	2	1957, 1958
Motoshi Fujita*	Central	2	1958, 1959
Tokuji Nagaike	Pacific	2	1969, 1971
Koji Yamamoto*	Central	2	1975, 1980
Yutaka Enatsu	Both	2	1979, 1981
Hiromitsu Ochiai	Pacific	2	1982, 1985
Osamu Higashio	Pacific	2	1983, 1987
Atsuya Furuta	Central	2	1993, 1997
Kimiyasu Kudo	Pacific	2	1993, 1999
Nobuhiko Matsunaka	Pacific	2	2000, 2004
Michihiro Ogasawara	Both	2	2006, 2007
Yu Darvish	Pacific	2	2007, 2009
Alex Ramírez	Central	2	2008, 2009
Yoshihiro Maru	Central	2	2017, 2018
Yuki Yanagita	Pacific	2	2015, 2020
Munetaka Murakami	Central	2	2021, 2022

== Wins by team ==
Pink indicate team that no longer exists

Team	League	# of Awards	Seasons
Yomiuri Giants (Note: Formerly known as Tokyo Kyojin)	JBL / Central	47	1937 (Spring), 1938 (Fall), 1939, 1940, 1941, 1942, 1943, 1951, 1952, 1953, 1955, 1956, 1957, 1958, 1959, 1961, 1963, 1964, 1965, 1966, 1967, 1968, 1969, 1970, 1971, 1972, 1973, 1974, 1976, 1977, 1981, 1983, 1987, 1989, 1990, 1994, 1996, 2000, 2002, 2007, 2008, 2009, 2012, 2014, 2019, 2020, 2024
Fukuoka SoftBank Hawks (Note: Formerly known as Nankai Club, Kinki Nippon Club, Great Ring, Nankai Hawks, Fukuoka Daiei Hawks)	JBL/Pacific	26	1946, 1948, 1951, 1952, 1953, 1955, 1959, 1961, 1963, 1964, 1965, 1966, 1973, 1988, 1999, 2000, 2003, 2004, 2005, 2010, 2011, 2015, 2017, 2020, 2024, 2025
Orix Buffaloes (Note: Formerly known as Hankyu Club, the Hankyu Braves, the Orix Braves, Orix BlueWave)	Pacific	17	1967, 1968, 1969, 1971, 1972, 1975, 1976, 1977, 1978, 1984, 1994, 1995, 1996, 2014, 2021, 2022, 2023
Saitama Seibu Lions (Note: Formerly known as Nishitetsu Clippers, the Nishitetsu Lions, the Taiheiyo Club Lions, the Crown Lighter Lions, Seibu Lions)	Pacific	15	1954, 1956, 1957, 1958, 1983, 1986, 1987, 1991, 1992, 1993, 1997, 1998, 2002, 2018, 2019
Tokyo Yakult Swallows (Note: Formerly known as Kokutestu Swallows, Sankei Swallows, Sankei Atoms, Tokyo Swallows)	Central	10	1978, 1992, 1993, 1995, 1997, 2001, 2013, 2015, 2021, 2022
Hanshin Tigers (Note: Formerly known as Osaka Tigers, Hanshin Club)	JBL / Central	9	1944, 1947, 1949, 1962, 1985, 2003, 2005, 2023, 2025
Hiroshima Toyo Carp (Note: Formerly known as Hiroshima Carp)	Central	9	1975, 1979, 1980, 1984, 1986, 1991, 2016, 2017, 2018
Hokkaido Nippon-Ham Fighters (Note: Formerly known as Senators, Tokyu Flyers, Kyuei Flyers, Toei Flyers, Nittaku Home Flyers, Nippon-Ham Fighters)	Pacific	8	1962, 1980, 1981, 2006, 2007, 2009, 2012, 2016
Chunichi Dragons	Central	8	1954, 1982, 1988, 1999, 2004, 2006, 2010, 2011
Chiba Lotte Marines (Note: Formerly known as Mainichi Orions, Mainichi Daiei Orions, Tokyo Orions, Lotte Orions)	Pacific	6	1950, 1960, 1970, 1974, 1982, 1985
Osaka Kintetsu Buffaloes	Pacific	4	1979, 1989, 1990, 2001
Tohoku Rakuten Golden Eagles	Pacific	2	2008, 2013
Tokyo Senators	JBL	1	1938 (Spring)
Yokohama DeNA BayStars	Central	2	1960, 1998
Yamato Baseball Club	JBL	1	1937 (Fall)
Shochiku Robins	Central	1	1950

== Notes ==
- ^{B} The save statistic was not formally recorded in the NPB until the 1974 season.
- ^{C} The 1945 Japanese Baseball League was cancelled due to World War II.
- ^{D} After 1958, Kazuto Yamamoto became known as Kazuto Tsuruoka.
- ^{E} Tetsuharu Kawakami received his first MVP award in 1941, nine years before the formation of Nippon Professional Baseball.

== See also ==
- Nippon Professional Baseball#Awards
- Baseball awards#Japan
- List of Nippon Professional Baseball earned run average champions
- Japan Professional Sports Grand Prize
- Athlete of the Year
- Most valuable player
- Player of the year award

== Notes ==
General

- "最優秀選手（１リーグ）" [MVPs (1 League)] (in Japanese). Nikkan Sports.
- "セ・リーグ歴代ＭＶＰ" [Central League Past MVPs]. Sankei Sports (in Japanese). Sankei Shimbun.
- "パ・リーグ歴代ＭＶＰ" [Pacific League Past MVPs]. Sankei Sports (in Japanese). Sankei Shimbun. Archived from the original on 2 November 2019.
- "List of Hall of Famers". The Baseball Hall of Fame and Museum. Archived from the original on 15 July 2009.

Specific
