= 1960 Japan Series =

Baseball championship

Team (Wins)	Managers	Season
Taiyo Whales (4)	Osamu Mihara	70–56–4 (.554), 4½ GA
Daimai Orions (0)	Yukio Nishimoto	82–48–3 (.631), 4 GA
- Dates: October 11–15
- MVP: Akihito Kondō (Taiyo)
- FSA: Kenjiro Tamiya (Daimai)

The 1960 Japan Series was the championship series of Nippon Professional Baseball (NPB) for the 1960 season. The 11th edition of the Series, it was a best-of-seven playoff that matched the Pacific League champion Daimai Orions against the Central League champion Taiyo Whales. The Whales defeated the Orions in four games for their first championship in history. With the win, Osamu Mihara became the first manager to win the Japan Series with multiple teams, as he previously won it with the Nishitetsu Lions (1956, 1957, 1958). Only two other managers have accomplished the feat since.

== Summary ==
CL Taiyo Whales (4) vs. PL Daimai Orions (0)

Game	Date	Score	Location	Time	Attendance
1	October 11	Daimai Orions – 0, Taiyo Whales – 1	Kawasaki Stadium	2:12	18,354
2	October 12	Daimai Orions – 2, Taiyo Whales – 3	Kawasaki Stadium	2:29	18,421
3	October 14	Taiyo Whales – 6, Daimai Orions – 5	Korakuen Stadium	2:38	31,586
4	October 15	Taiyo Whales – 1, Daimai Orions – 0	Korakuen Stadium	2:44	32,409

== Matchups ==
=== Game 1 ===
Tuesday, October 11, 1960 – 1:04 pm at Kawasaki Stadium in Kawasaki, Kanagawa Prefecture

Team	1	2	3	4	5	6	7	8	9	R	H	E
Daimai	0	0	0	0	0	0	0	0	0	0	5	0
Taiyo	0	0	0	0	0	0	1	0	X	1	5	0
WP: Noboru Akiyama (1–0) LP: Katsumi Nakanishi (0–1); Home runs: DAI: None; TAI: Hidenori Kanemitsu (1)

=== Game 2 ===
Wednesday, October 12, 1960 – 12:59 pm at Kawasaki Stadium in Kawasaki, Kanagawa Prefecture

Team	1	2	3	4	5	6	7	8	9	R	H	E
Daimai	0	0	0	0	0	2	0	0	0	2	5	0
Taiyo	0	0	0	0	0	2	1	0	X	3	9	1
WP: Noboru Akiyama (1–0) LP: Gentarō Shimada (0–1); Home runs: DAI: Kihachi Enomoto (1); TAI: None

=== Game 3 ===
Friday, October 14, 1960 – 1:00 pm at Korakuen Stadium in Bunkyō, Tokyo

Team	1	2	3	4	5	6	7	8	9	R	H	E
Taiyo	2	1	0	0	2	0	0	0	1	6	10	0
Daimai	0	0	0	0	2	1	0	2	0	5	7	2
WP: Masatoshi Gondō (1–0) LP: Katsumi Nakanishi (0–2); Home runs: TAI: Akihito Kondō (1); DAI: Toshio Yanagida (1)

=== Game 4 ===
Saturday, October 15, 1960 – 1:00 pm at Korakuen Stadium in Bunkyō, Tokyo

Team	1	2	3	4	5	6	7	8	9	R	H	E
Taiyo	0	0	0	0	1	0	0	0	0	1	7	0
Daimai	0	0	0	0	0	0	0	0	0	0	9	0
WP: Noboru Akiyama (2–0) LP: Gentarō Shimada (0–2)

== See also ==
- 1960 World Series
