= 1961 Japan Series =

Team (Wins)	Managers	Season
Yomiuri Giants (4)	Tetsuharu Kawakami	71–53–6 (.569), 1 GA
Nankai Hawks (2)	Kazuto Tsuruoka	85–49–6 (.629), 2½ GA
- Dates: October 22 – November 1
- MVP: Andy Miyamoto (Yomiuri)
- FSA: Joe Stanka (Nankai)

The 1961 Japan Series was the championship series of Nippon Professional Baseball (NPB) for the 1961 season. The 12th edition of the Series, it was a best-of-seven playoff that matched the Pacific League champion Nankai Hawks against the Central League champion Yomiuri Giants.

== Summary ==
CL Yomiuri Giants (4) vs. PL Nankai Hawks (2)

Game	Date	Score	Location	Time	Attendance
1	October 22	Yomiuri Giants – 0, Nankai Hawks – 6	Osaka Stadium	2:19	30,720
2	October 24	Yomiuri Giants – 6, Nankai Hawks – 4	Osaka Stadium	2:41	26,845
3	October 26	Nankai Hawks – 4, Yomiuri Giants – 5	Korakuen Stadium	2:23	30,878
4	October 29	Nankai Hawks – 3, Yomiuri Giants – 4	Korakuen Stadium	2:18	33,186
5	October 30	Nankai Hawks – 6, Yomiuri Giants – 3	Korakuen Stadium	2:28	30,135
6	November 1	Yomiuri Giants – 3, Nankai Hawks – 2	Osaka Stadium	2:45	21,565

== Matchups ==
=== Game 1 ===
Sunday, October 22, 1961 – 1:00 pm at Osaka Stadium in Osaka, Osaka Prefecture

Team	1	2	3	4	5	6	7	8	9	R	H	E
Yomiuri	0	0	0	0	0	0	0	0	0	0	3	1
Nankai	0	2	0	1	1	1	1	0	X	6	10	0
WP: Joe Stanka (1–0) LP: Minoru Nakamura (0–1); Home runs: YOM: None; NAN: Katsuya Nomura (1), Yoshio Anabuki (1), Yōsuke Terata (1)

=== Game 2 ===
Tuesday, October 24, 1961 – 12:59 pm at Osaka Stadium in Osaka, Osaka Prefecture

Team	1	2	3	4	5	6	7	8	9	R	H	E
Yomiuri	0	0	1	2	0	1	0	2	0	6	14	1
Nankai	0	0	0	0	0	0	0	3	1	4	7	3
WP: Ritsuo Horimoto (1–0) LP: Mutsuo Minagawa (0–1); Home runs: YOM: None; NAN: Yoshio Anabuki (2)

=== Game 3 ===
Thursday, October 26, 1961 – 1:01 pm at Korakuen Stadium in Bunkyō, Tokyo

Team	1	2	3	4	5	6	7	8	9	R	H	E
Nankai	0	0	4	0	0	0	0	0	0	4	5	3
Yomiuri	0	1	0	1	0	0	3	0	X	5	8	1
WP: Yoshiaki Itō (1–0) LP: Joe Stanka (1–1); Home runs: NAN: None; YOM: Andy Miyamoto (1)

=== Game 4 ===
Sunday, October 29, 1961 – 1:00 pm at Korakuen Stadium in Bunkyō, Tokyo

Team	1	2	3	4	5	6	7	8	9	R	H	E
Nankai	0	1	0	0	0	0	0	0	2	3	3	1
Yomiuri	0	2	0	0	0	0	0	0	2X	4	8	0
WP: Ritsuo Horimoto (2–0) LP: Chikara Morinaka (0–1); Home runs: NAN: Kōhei Sugiyama (1), Yoshinori Hirose (1); YOM: None

=== Game 5 ===
Monday, October 30, 1961 – 1:00 pm at Korakuen Stadium in Bunkyō, Tokyo

Team	1	2	3	4	5	6	7	8	9	R	H	E
Nankai	2	1	0	0	2	0	0	0	1	6	9	1
Yomiuri	1	0	0	0	0	1	0	1	0	3	7	2
WP: Joe Stanka (2–1) LP: Motoshi Fujita (0–1); Home runs: NAN: Yōsuke Terata (2), Katsuya Nomura (2); YOM: Shigeo Nagashima (1)

=== Game 6 ===
Wednesday, November 1, 1961 – 1:07 pm at Osaka Stadium in Osaka, Osaka Prefecture

Team	1	2	3	4	5	6	7	8	9	10	R	H	E
Yomiuri	0	2	0	0	0	0	0	0	0	1	3	8	0
Nankai	0	1	0	0	0	0	0	1	0	0	2	7	0
WP: Minoru Nakamura (1–1) LP: Joe Stanka (2–2); Home runs: YOM: Sadaharu Oh (1); NAN: Katsuya Nomura (3), Yōsuke Terata (3)

== See also ==
- 1961 World Series
