= Teruaki Satō =

Japanese baseball player (born 1999)

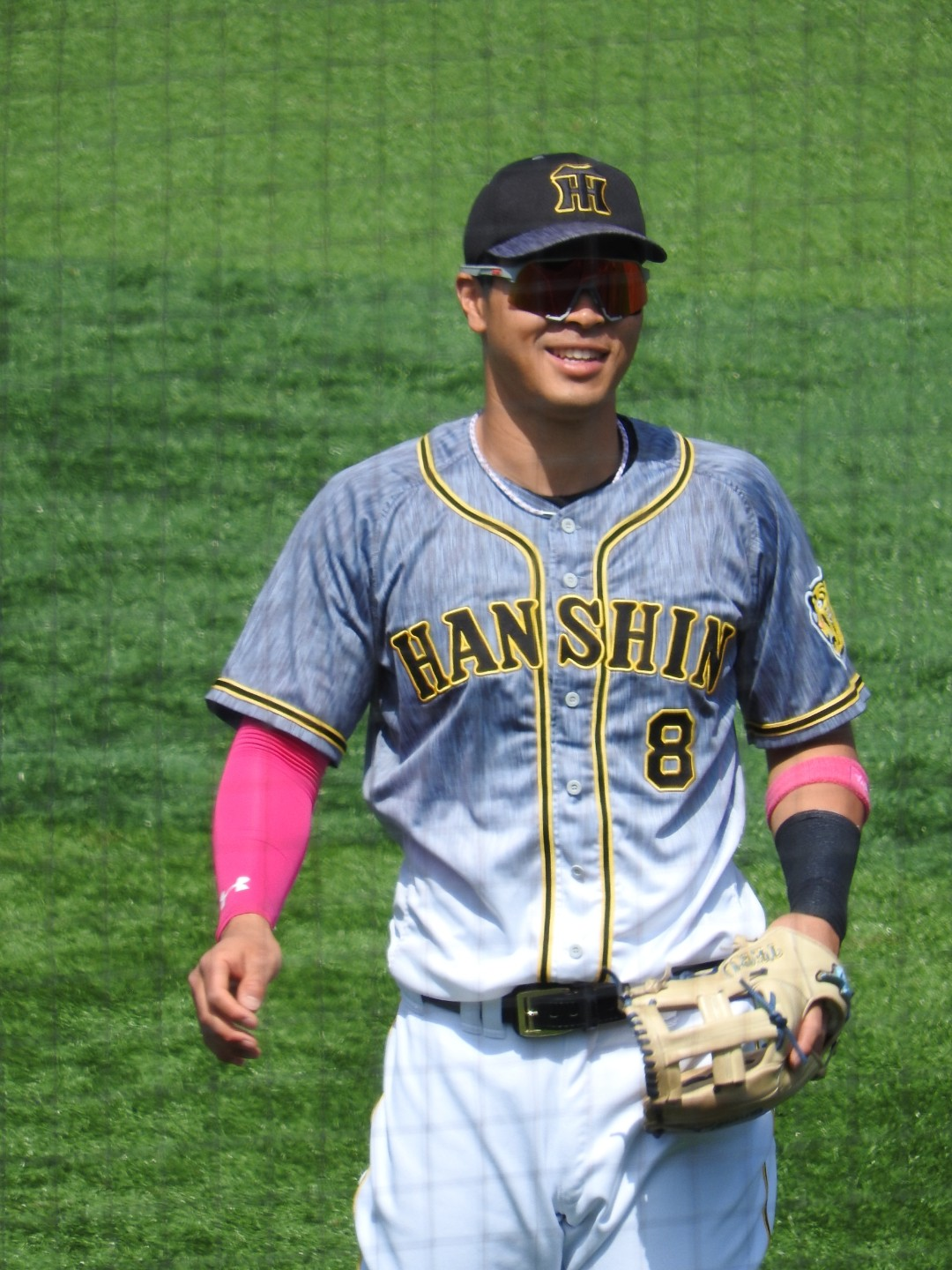
- Satō playing for the Tigers

Hanshin Tigers – No. 8
- Infielder
- Born: March 13, 1999 (age 27); Nishinomiya, Hyōgo, Japan
- Bats: Left Throws: Right

NPB debut
- March 26, 2021, for the Hanshin Tigers

NPB statistics (through 2026 season)
- Batting average: .271
- Home runs: 163
- Runs batted in: 518
- Stats at Baseball Reference

Teams
- Hanshin Tigers (2021–present)

Career highlights and awards
- Central League MVP (2025); Central League Best Nine Award (2025); Central League Mitsui Golden Glove Award (2025); Triple Crown (2026); 5× NPB All-Star (2021–2023, 2025–2026); Central League Federation Special Award (2021); Japan Series champion (2023)

Teruaki Satō (佐藤 輝明, Satō Teruaki; born March 13, 1999) is a Japanese professional baseball infielder for the Hanshin Tigers of Nippon Professional Baseball (NPB).

== Early career ==
Teruaki started playing little league baseball in 1st grade for Kōtō Elementary School, and was chosen to play for the Hanshin Tigers Juniors team in his 6th grade. He joined the Kōryō Junior High baseball team, and played both pitcher and catcher positions.

He continued to play for Nigawa High School, but his team did not make it to any national tournaments in Koshien. Because he only managed to hit 5 home runs until the end of his 2nd year, he took up weight training to improve his hitting power. This paid off and he hit 15 home runs in his 3rd year, bringing his total high school home run count to 20. While he did not get scouted by any of the NPB teams, he caught the attention of the Kinki University (Kindai) baseball coach and was invited to enroll there.

He became a regular in the Kindai lineup, first as a left outfielder then finally as 3rd baseman. He then became the team's most productive hitter as they played in the Kansai Big Six Baseball League where he was awarded Best Nine for 3 consecutive seasons. In his 2nd year, he was chosen as the League MVP, and was also selected to play for the national team in the 2018 Haarlem Baseball Week and the USA vs Japan Collegiate All-Star Series. In his senior year, he broke the league home run record by hitting 14, was once more awarded league MVP, and helped his team win their first championship in 3 years. He finished with a 0.288 batting average, 14 home runs and 69 RBIs in 88 appearances.

== Professional career ==
Satō was the 1st round draft pick of the Fukuoka SoftBank Hawks, Orix Buffaloes, Yomiuri Giants and the Hanshin Tigers during the 2020 Nippon Professional Baseball draft. Hanshin manager Akihiro Yano drew the winning ticket, and Satō signed a 100 million yen contract with the team that included a 50 million yen signing bonus, for an estimated annual salary of 16 million yen. He was assigned the jersey number 8, formerly worn by Kosuke Fukudome.

On March 17, 2021, Satō broke the Nippon Professional Baseball rookie home run record in pre-season exhibition games by hitting 6, previously held by Kyosuke Sasaki when he hit 5 in 1972. This earned him a spot in the season opening game against the Tokyo Yakult Swallows on March 26. He started the season slow and was only batting at .196 by mid-April, with the worst strikeout rate in the team as he averaged above 40%. Nevertheless, he continued to display his hitting power by belting home runs, including one that flew out of Yokohama Stadium on April 9. His hitting eventually picked up and by April 28, he set a new Tiger rookie record for most RBI by the end of April by driving in 18 RBIs (previously set in 1950). As Yūsuke Ōyama was recovering from an injury on May 2, Satō was assigned the clean-up spot and he notched five RBI including his first career grand slam that stole the lead from the Hiroshima Toyo Carp and propelled him to the top of the team leaderboard in both home runs (9) and RBI (24). In his 33rd appearance of the year on May 7, Satō hit his 10th home run and broke the record for fastest drafted NPB rookie to reach double digit homers (36 games). On May 28, he again drove in 5 RBIs including a 3-run home run on the 9th that won the game against the Saitama Seibu Lions. This made him the first rookie in 63 years to hit 3 home runs in a single game since Shigeo Nagashima in 1958. In a July 4 game against the Hiroshima Toyo Carp, Satō struck out 5 times in the game, tying an NPB record. On September 29, Satō set the NPB record for most plate appearances without getting a hit by a non-pitcher after going 54 consecutive plate appearances without a hit. In 2026, he won the Triple Crown, becoming the ninth player in NPB history to achieve the feat and the second player in Hanshin Tigers history to do so, after Randy Bass.

On November 1, 2026, the Hanshin Tigers posted Satō to Major League Baseball, giving teams a chance to sign him within the next two months.

== International career ==
On January 16, 2026, Satō was selected to play for Japan in the 2026 World Baseball Classic.

== Personal life ==
He is the eldest son in a sporting family. His father, Hironobu Sato, was a national judo champion, and his brother currently plays infielder for Kwansei Gakuin University. His interest in baseball waned in junior high and he was leaning towards joining the soccer club before one of his friends persuaded him to join the baseball club instead.
