= Yoshio Anabuki =

Japanese baseball player and manager (1933–2018)

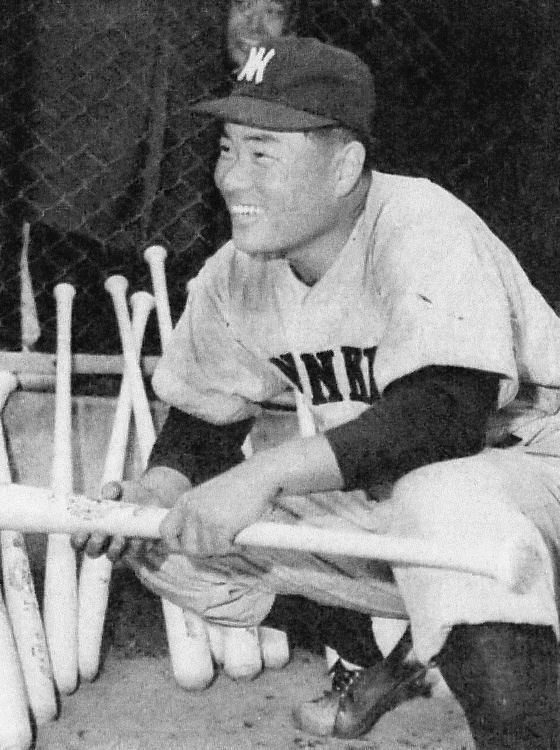
- Outfielder/Manager
- Born: May 6, 1933; Kagawa, Kagawa, Japan
- Died: July 31, 2018 (aged 85); Sakai, Japan
- Batted: Right Threw: Right

NPB debut
- 1956, for the Nankai Hawks

Last appearance
- 1968, for the Nankai Hawks

NPB statistics
- Batting average: .264
- Home runs: 89
- RBI: 404
- Hits: 814

Teams
- As player: Nankai Hawks (1956–1968); As manager: Nankai Hawks (1977, 1983–1985)

Yoshio Anabuki (穴吹 義雄, Anabuki Yoshio; May 6, 1933 – July 31, 2018) was a Japanese baseball player and former manager of the Nankai Hawks.

Anabuki died July 31, 2018.
