= Masayuki Dobashi =

Japanese baseball player and manager (1935–2013)

Masayuki Dobashi 土橋 正幸
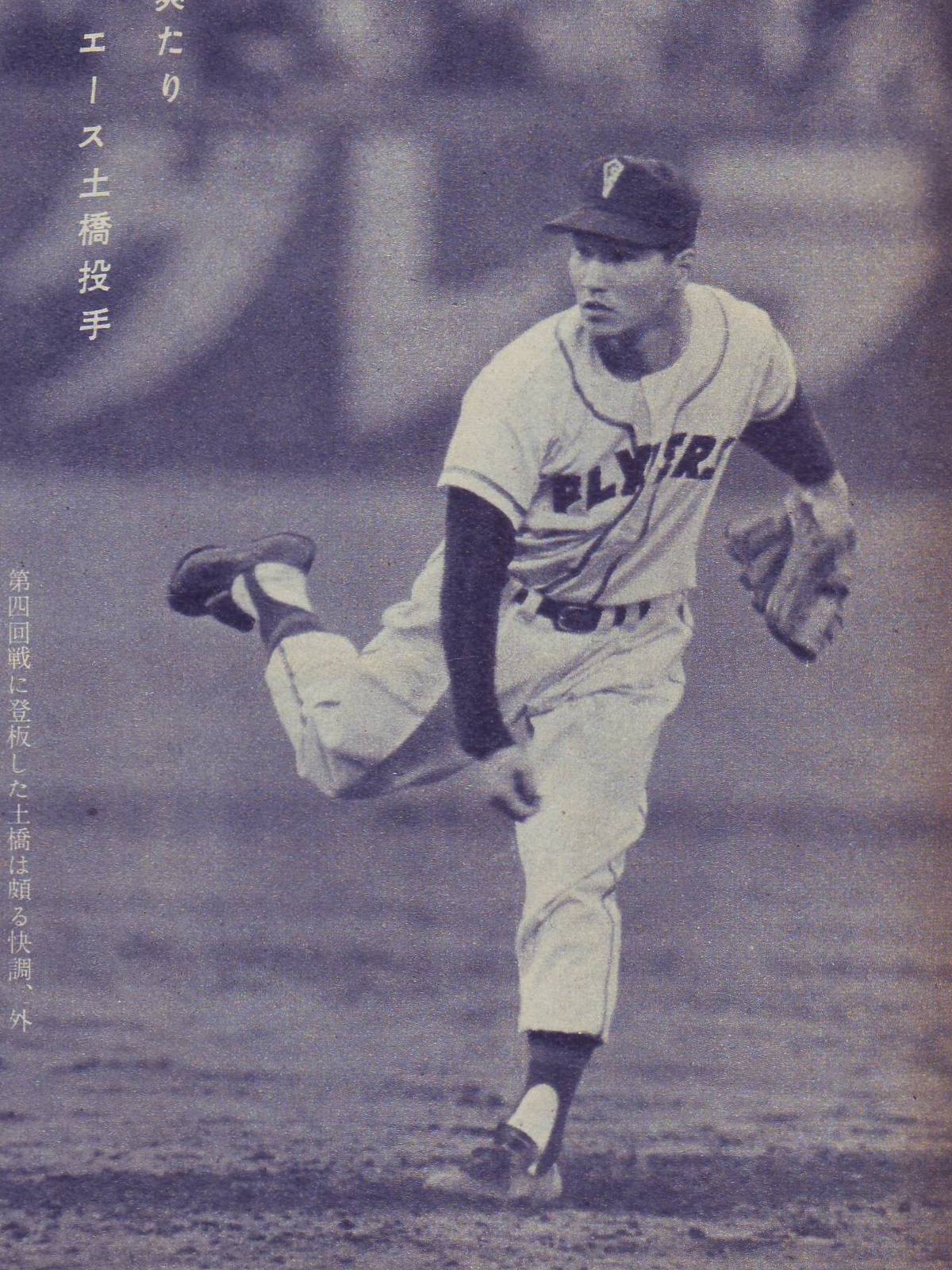
- Pitcher / Manager
- Born: 5 December 1935; Tokyo, Japan
- Died: 24 August 2013 (aged 77); Tokyo, Japan
- Batted: Right Threw: Right

NPB debut
- 1956, for the Toei Flyers

Last appearance
- 1967, for the Toei Flyers

NPB statistics (through 1967)
- ERA: 2.66
- Win–loss: 162-135
- Strikeouts: 1562

Teams
- As player: Toei Flyers (1956–1967); As coach: Toei Flyers/Nittaku Home Flyers/Nippon-Ham Fighters (1969–1973); Yakult Swallows (1984); As manager: Nittaku Home Flyers (1973); Yakult Swallows (1984–1986); Nippon-Ham Fighters (1992)

Career highlights and awards
- 7× NPB All-Star (1958-1964); Japan Series Most Valuable Player Award (1962)

Masayuki Dobashi (土橋 正幸, 5 December 1935 – 24 August 2013) was a baseball player and manager in Japan. As a pitcher he won over 162 games. He played in the Pacific League for the Toei Flyers. He died from ALS.
