= Kiyoshi Doi =

Japanese baseball player

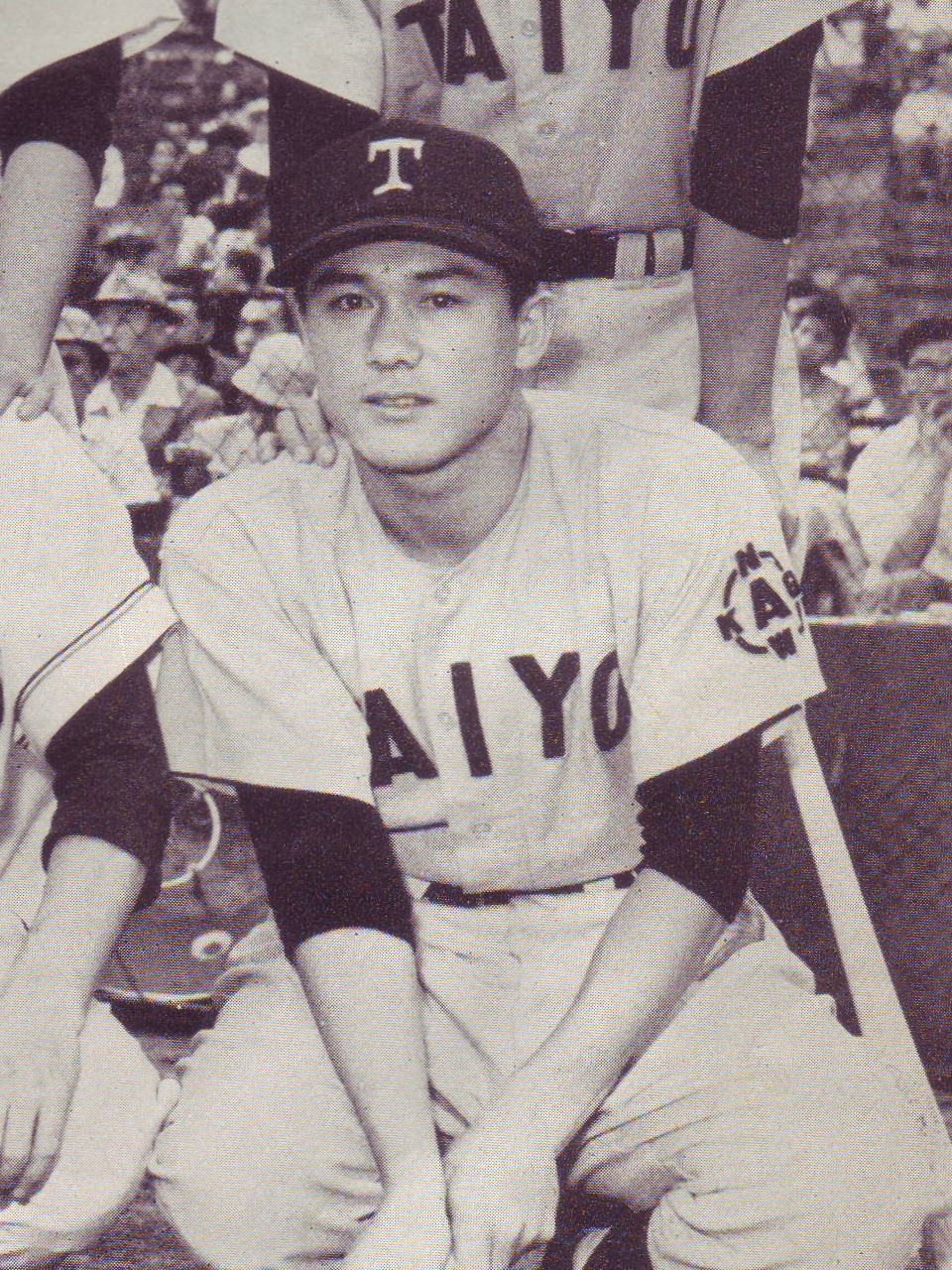
- Kiyoshi Doi in 1956
- Catcher / Coach
- Born: June 10, 1933 (age 92); Okayama, Okayama, Japan
- Batted: Right Threw: Right

NPB debut
- March 21, 1956, for the Taiyō Whales

Last NPB appearance
- October 1, 1968, for the Taiyō Whales

NPB statistics (through 1968)
- Batting average: .215
- Home runs: 23
- Hits: 508

Teams
- As player: Taiyō Whales (1956–1968); As manager: Taiyō Whales/Yokohama Taiyō Whales (1980–1981); As coach: Taiyō Whales/Yokohama Taiyō Whales (1969–1973, 1978–1979); Hanshin Tigers (1985–1987)
- Last updated on: 4 February 2017

Kiyoshi Doi (土井 淳, Doi Kiyoshi) is a former baseball player from Japan. He played in the Central League for Taiyō Whales Doi played as a catcher. He coached the Whales in various stints and served as a manager for two seasons.
