= Hiromitsu Kadota =

Japanese baseball player (1948–2023)

- Outfielder
- Born: February 26, 1948; Onoda, Japan
- Died: January 23, 2023 (aged 74); Aioi, Hyogo Prefecture, Japan
- Batted: Left Threw: Left

debut
- 1970, for the Nankai Hawks

Last appearance
- 1992, for the Fukuoka Daiei Hawks

Career statistics
- Batting average: .289
- Home runs: 567
- Hits: 2,566
- Runs batted in: 1,678
- Stats at Baseball Reference

Teams
- As player: Nankai Hawks (1970–1988); Orix Braves (1989–1990); Fukuoka Daiei Hawks (1991–1992)

Career highlights and awards
- Pacific League MVP (1988); 7x Best Nine Award (1971, 1976, 1977, 1981, 1983, 1988, 1989)

Member of the Japanese

Baseball Hall of Fame
- Induction: 2006

Hiromitsu Kadota (門田 博光, Kadota Hiromitsu; February 26, 1948 – January 23, 2023) was a Japanese professional baseball player for the Hawks franchise (known during his career as the Nankai Hawks and the Fukuoka Daiei Hawks) and the Orix Braves. Celebrated for his slugging ability, he ate a lot and became a strong hitter, though was later weakened by diabetes mellitus. With 567 home runs, Kadota is number three on the NPB career list.

Kadota won the Nippon Professional Baseball Comeback Player of the Year Award in 1980 with 41 home runs and 84 RBI.

He hit 44 home runs at the age of 40 in 1988, also knocking in 125 runs and winning the Pacific League Most Valuable Player Award. He became the first 40-year-old to win the award in NPB history and is still the oldest player to win MVP in NPB history. That year he was also given the Matsutaro Shoriki Award, for contribution to the development of professional baseball.

After playing for the Orix Braves for two seasons, he returned to the Hawks in 1991; he retired after his last game against pitcher Hideo Nomo in 1992.

Kadota was inducted into the Japanese Baseball Hall of Fame in 2006.

Kadota died on January 23, 2023, after a police officer found him lying on the ground after having not showed up to an outpatient treatment in a hospital in Aioi, Hyogo and was confirmed dead on the scene.

== See also ==
- Nippon Professional Baseball Comeback Player of the Year Award
- List of top Nippon Professional Baseball home run hitters
- List of Nippon Professional Baseball players with 1,000 runs batted in
- List of Nippon Professional Baseball career hits leaders
