= List of Nippon Professional Baseball players =

The following is a list of Nippon Professional Baseball players, retired or active. Managers are also included for convenience.

The list is broken down into a page of each letter to reduce the size.

== See also ==
- List of Japanese players in Major League Baseball
