= Tadashi Sugiura =

Japanese baseball player

Tadashi Sugiura 杉浦 忠
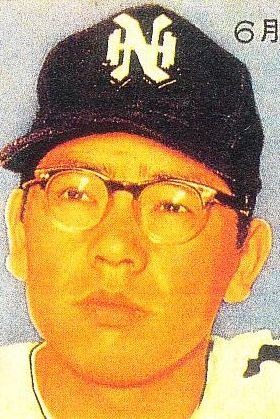
- Tadashi Sugiura in 1959
- Pitcher / Coach / Manager
- Born: September 17, 1935; Agemo, Aichi, Japan
- Died: November 11, 2001 (aged 66); Osaka, Japan
- Batted: Right Threw: Right

NPB debut
- April 5, 1958, for the Nankai Hawks

Last NPB appearance
- October 10, 1970, for the Nankai Hawks

NPB statistics
- Win–loss: 187-106
- ERA: 2.39
- Strikeouts: 1756
- Managerial record: 223-271-26
- Winning %: .451

Teams
- As player: Nankai Hawks (1958–1970); As manager: Nankai Hawks / Daiei Hawks (1986–1989); As coach: Nankai Hawks (1966–1967); Kintetsu Buffaloes (1974–1977)

Career highlights and awards
- Pacific League Rookie of the Year (1958); Pacific League MVP (1959); Japanese Triple Crown (1959); Japan Series MVP(1959); 5x 20-game winner (1958, 1959, 1960, 1961, 1964,); 2x 30-game winner (1959, 1960)

Member of the Japanese

Baseball Hall of Fame
- Induction: 1995

Tadashi Sugiura (杉浦 忠, Sugiura Tadashi; September 17, 1935 – November 11, 2001) was a Japanese Nippon Professional Baseball player with the Nankai Hawks. He debuted in the 1958 and went on to join the Japanese Baseball Hall of Fame for his skills as a pitcher. He won the Japanese Triple Crown in (1959)

== Early life ==
Sugiura was born in Agemo (later Toyota), Aichi. He was not famous in high school, but became a well-known pitcher after entering Rikkyo University. Shigeo Nagashima entered the university at the same year. He changed his pitching style to Sidearm in his second year of university, because of his trouble with his glasses.

In Tokyo Big6 Baseball League, his team became a champion at Spring League and Autumn League in 1957, and pitched a no-hitter in a game against Waseda.
