= Kazuhiko Sakazaki =

Japanese baseball player (1938–2014)

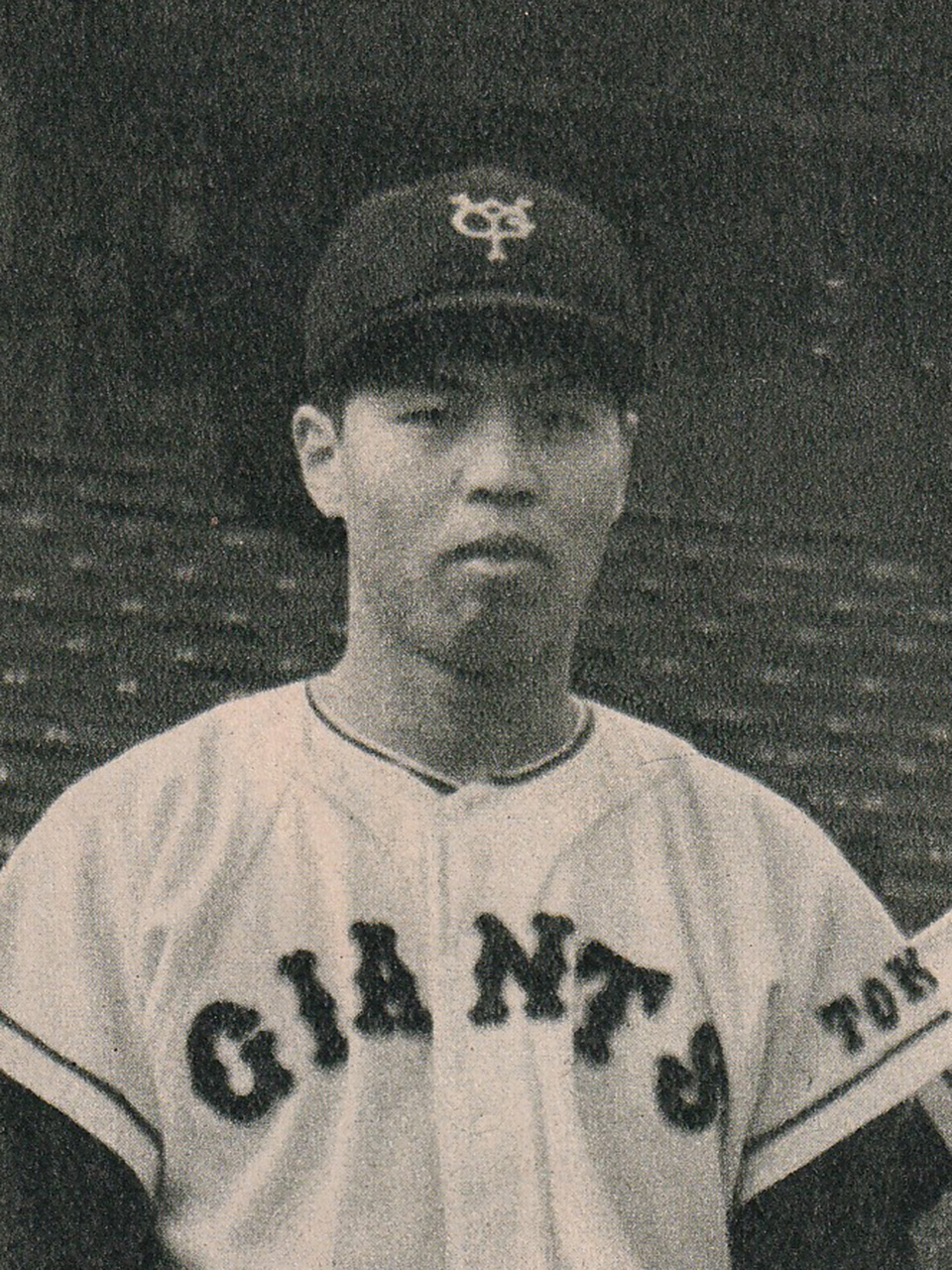
Yomiuri Giants, 1956

Kazuhiko Sakazaki (坂崎一彦, Sakazaki Kazuhiko; January 5, 1938 – January 28, 2014) was a Japanese baseball player who played as an outfielder.

Born in Toyonaka, Osaka, he played for the Yomiuri Giants (1956–1964) and the Toei Flyers (1965–1967).

After he retired from baseball, he took over the electric construction family business, and was also a member of the "Japan Baseball Promotion Association".

He died on January 28, 2014, from stomach cancer.
