= Noboru Akiyama =

Japanese baseball player (1934–2000)

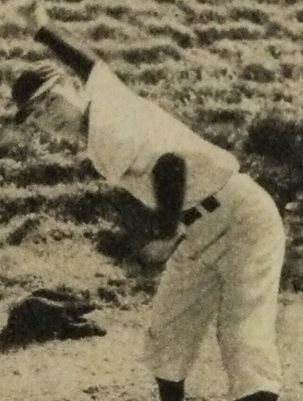
- Pitcher
- Born: February 3, 1934; Okayama, Okayama, Japan
- Died: August 12, 2000 (aged 66); Japan
- Batted: Right Threw: Right

debut
- March 21, 1956, for the Taiyo Whales

Teams
- As player: Taiyo Whales (1956–1967); As manager: Taiyo Whales (1975–1976); As coach: Taiyo Whales (1963–1974, 1977)

Career highlights and awards
- 1956 Central League Rookie of the Year; 1960 Central League MVP

Member of the Japanese

Baseball Hall of Fame
- Induction: 2004
- Election method: Competitors Award

Noboru Akiyama (秋山 登, Akiyama Noboru; born February 3, 1934, died August 12, 2000) was a Japanese Nippon Professional Baseball pitcher, originally from Okayama, Okayama. He played with the Taiyo Whales. He is a member of the Japanese Baseball Hall of Fame.
