= Tōru Mori =

Japanese baseball player (1935–2014)

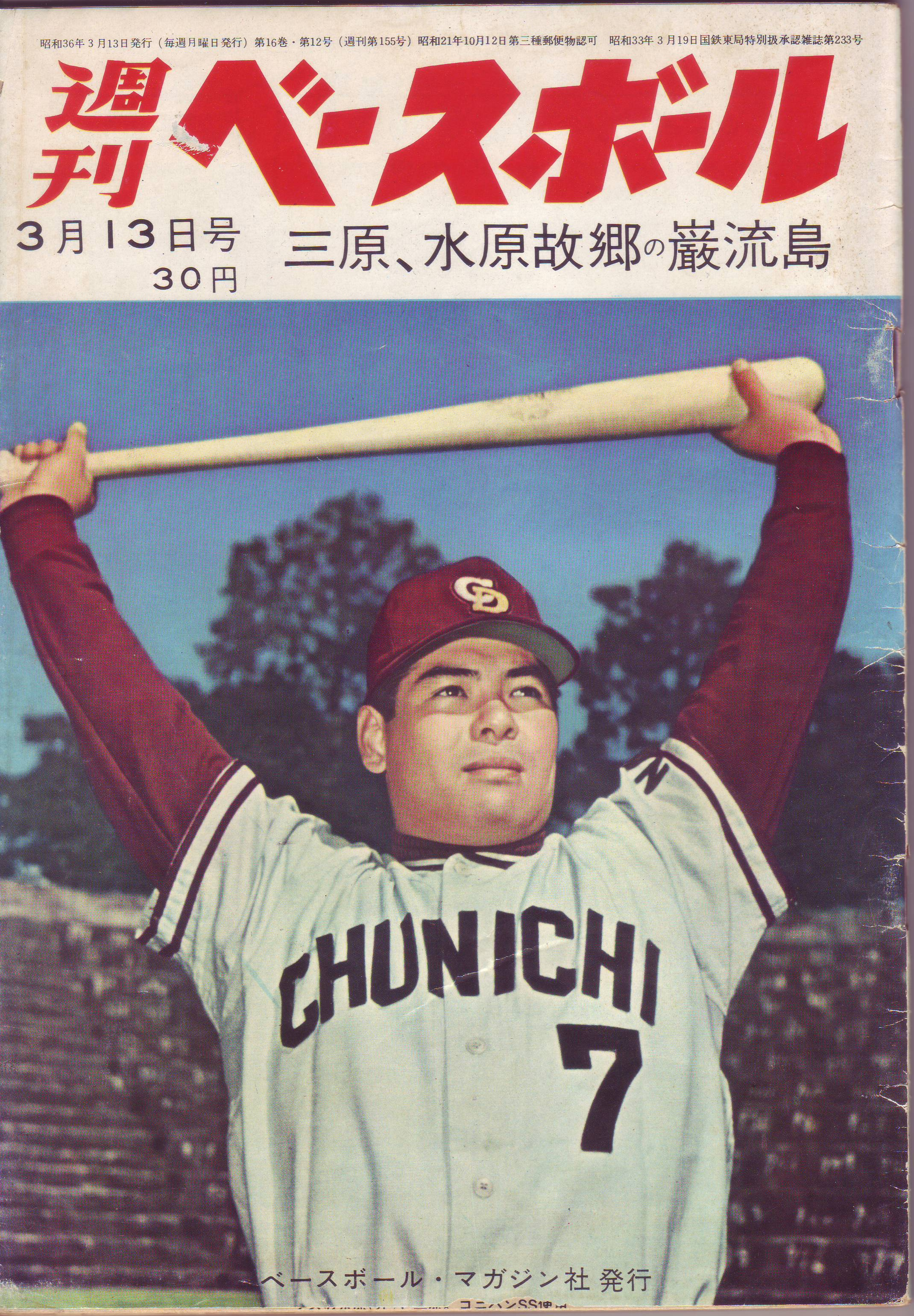
- Outfielder
- Born: 3 November 1935; Manchukuo
- Died: 6 February 2014 (aged 78); Tokyo, Japan
- Batted: Right Threw: Right

NPB debut
- April 5, 1958, for the Chunichi Dragons

Last NPB appearance
- 1968

Career statistics
- Batting average: .251
- Home runs: 189
- Runs batted in: 585
- Stats at Baseball Reference

Teams
- As player: Chunichi Dragons (1958–1961); Taiyō Whales (1962–1965); Tokyo Orions (1966–1968); Tokyo Dragons (1969); As manager: Tokyo Dragons (1969)

Career highlights and awards
- 3× Central League Best Nine Award (1958–1960); 5× NPB All-Star (1959–1963); Central League RBI leader (1959); Central League home run leader (1959)
- Last updated on: 11 January 2016

Tōru Mori (森 徹, Mori Tōru; 3 November 1935 – 6 February 2014) was a Japanese professional baseball player.

Born in Manchuria, he was brought up in Hakodate, Hokkaido, later moving to Tokyo. He initially trained as a judoka, but eventually left it to become a baseball player. He started his baseball career playing for the Waseda University team, before turning professional by joining the Chunichi Dragons.

== Personal life ==
His son, Takeshi Mori, is an anime director, and his daughter, Iku Mori, is a jazz singer.

He died on 6 February 2014 from hepatocellular carcinoma, aged 78.
