= Ritsuo Horimoto =

Japanese baseball player and coach

- Pitcher
- Born: January 20, 1935; Osaka Prefecture
- Died: January 14, 2012 (aged 76); Yokohama, Kanagawa
- Batted: Right Threw: Right

NPB debut
- 1960, for the Yomiuri Giants

Last appearance
- 1965, for the Tokyo Orions

NPB statistics
- Win–loss record: 63–59
- Earned run average: 3.18
- Strikeouts: 1,273
- Stats at Baseball Reference

Teams
- As player: Yomiuri Giants (1960–1962); Daimai/Tokyo Orions (1963–1965); As coach: (Yokohama) Taiyo Whales (1977–1978; 1991–1992); Nippon Ham Fighters (1993–1994); Uni-President Lions (1997)

Career highlights and awards
- Eiji Sawamura Award (1960); Central League Rookie of the Year Award (1960); 1961 Japan Series champion

Ritsuo Horimoto (堀本律雄, Horimoto Ritsuo; January 20, 1935 – January 14, 2012) was a Japanese baseball pitcher.

He played for the Yomiuri Giants from 1960 to 1962, winning both the Central League Rookie of the Year Award and the Eiji Sawamura Award in his first season. The Giants won the Japan Series the next year, and traded him for Toshio Yanagida at the end of the 1962 season. Horimoto closed his playing career with the Orions franchise, and coached the Yokohama Taiyo Whales in two stints from 1977 to 1978 and 1991 to 1992. He then joined the Nippon Ham Fighters coaching staff for two seasons, 1993 and 1994, followed by a return to coaching in 1997 with the Uni-President Lions, a Chinese Professional Baseball League team.

Horimoto died of pneumonia in Yokohama on January 14, 2012, at the age of 76.
