= 2024 Nippon Professional Baseball draft =

Japanese baseball draft event

2024 Nippon Professional Baseball Draft
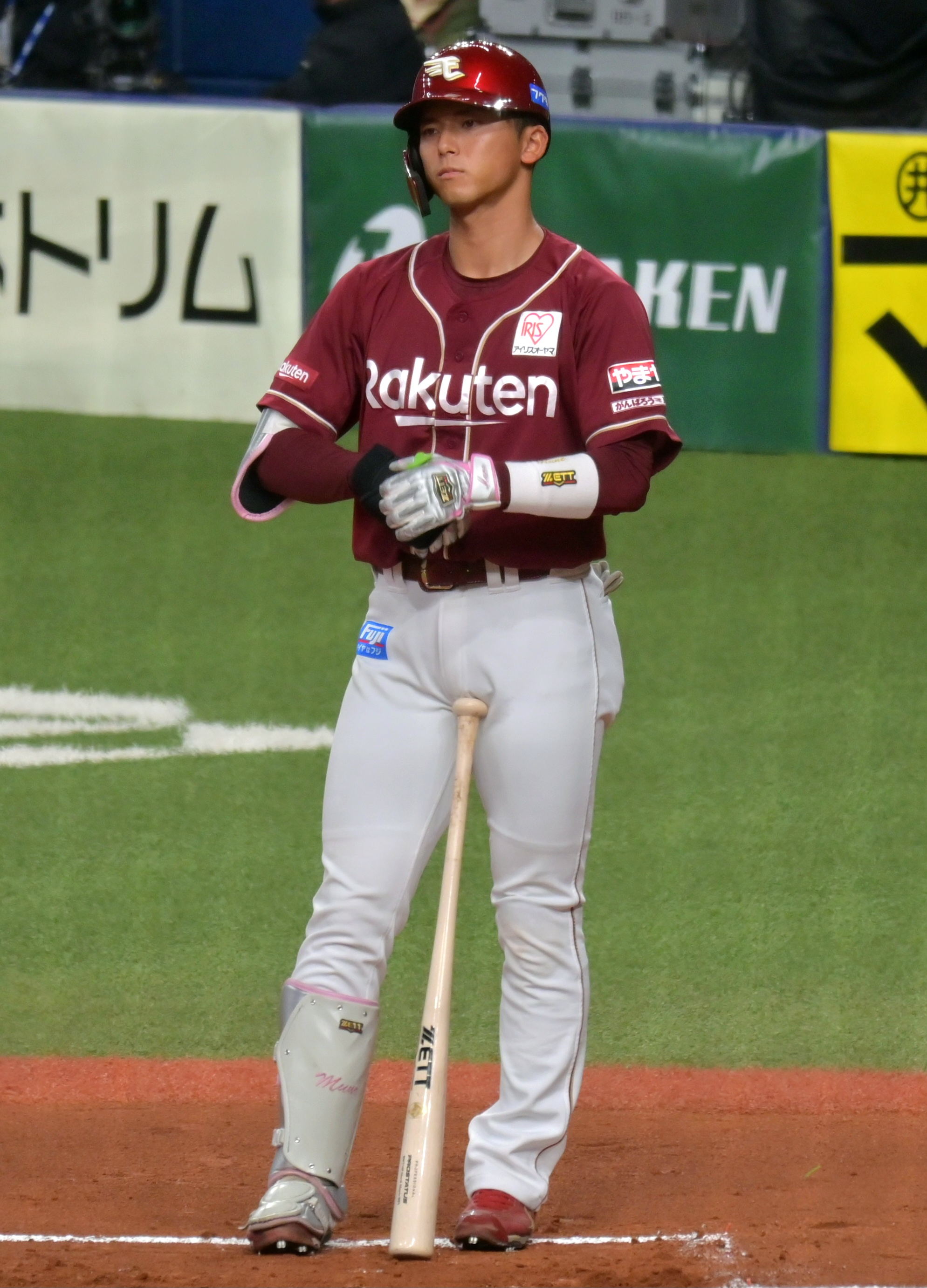
- Rui Muneyama, who was nominated by five different teams in the first round bid lottery.

General information
- Sport: Baseball
- Date: October 24, 2024
- Location: Grand Prince Hotel Takanawa, Tokyo
- Networks: TBS (first round), sky-A
- Sponsored by: Taisho Pharmaceutical

Overview
- 123 total selections in 13 (Includes draft for developmental players) rounds
- League: Nippon Professional Baseball
- First round selections: Rui Muneyama (Nominated by 5 teams.); Yumeto Kanemaru (Nominated by 4 teams.), Mishō Nishikawa (Nominated by 2 teams.), Yusei Ishizuka, Reo Shibata (Nominated by 2 teams in re-draft.)

The 2024 Nippon Professional Baseball (NPB) Draft was held on October 24, 2024, for the 60th time at the Grand Prince Hotel Takanawa to assign amateur baseball players to the NPB. It was arranged with the special cooperation of Taisho Pharmaceutical with official naming rights. The draft was officially called "The Professional Baseball Draft Meeting supported by Lipovitan D ". It has been sponsored by Taisho Pharmaceutical for the 12th consecutive year since 2013.

== Format ==
The first round of the draft is conducted via a bid lottery, where every team submits bids for players they'd like to draft. Players that receive multiple nominations result in a drawing of the lots between the nominating teams. The losing teams of the lottery re-submit selections until they get a player without any nominations. Starting from the second round, teams will select in reverse order of the standings, alternating between Central League and Pacific League teams. This year, the Pacific League will have priority. From the third round the order was reversed continuing in the same fashion until all picks were exhausted. The draft ends when all teams are "selected" or when the total number of selected players reaches 120.

Following the expansion of the Eastern League and Western League to include the independent Niigata Albirex Baseball Club and Kufu HAYATE Ventures Shizuoka, respectively, it was announced that players in both clubs were eligible for the draft.

== First Round ==
	Player name	Position	Teams selected by
First Nomination	Rui Muneyama	OF	Lions, **Eagles**, Carp, Fighters, Hawks
First Nomination	Yumeto Kanemaru	LHP	**Dragons**, BayStars, Tigers, Giants
First Nomination	Mishō Nishikawa	OF	**Marines**, Buffaloes
First Nomination	Yuto Nakamura	RHP	**Swallows**
Second Nomination	Yusei Ishizuka	IF	Lions, **Giants**
Second Nomination	Reo Shibata	RHP	**Fighters**, Hawks
Second Nomination	Yūsuke Mugitani	OF	**Buffaloes**
Second Nomination	Takato Ihara	LHP	**Tigers**
Second Nomination	Tai Sasaki	IF	**Carp**
Second Nomination	Yu Takeda	IF	**BayStars**
Third Nomination	Hiroto Saitō	IF	**Lions**
Third Nomination	Taito Murakami	RHP	**Hawks**

- **Bolded** teams indicate who won the right to negotiate contract following a lottery.

List of selected players.

== Selected Players ==
Key
*	Player did not sign

- The order of the teams is the order of second round waiver priority.
- **Bolded** After that, a developmental player who contracted as a registered player under control.
- List of selected players.

=== Chiba Lotte Marines ===
Pick	Player name	Position	Team
1	Mishō Nishikawa	LHP	Aoyama Gakuin University
2	Ryūsei Miyazaki	INF	Yamaha Baseball Club
3	Rikima Ichijō	RHP	Toyo University
4	Haru Sakai	RHP	Kanto Daiichi High School
5	Kōshirō Hiroike	RHP	Kyushu Tokai University
6	Yū Tatematsu	C/INF	Nippon Life Baseball Club
Developmental Player Draft
1	Tsuyoshi Tanimura	INF	Wakayama Higashi High School
2	Yūta Ibaragi	RHP	Teikyo Nagaoka High School
3	Kōsuke Nagashima	RHP	Fuji University

=== Chunichi Dragons ===
Round	Player name	Position	Team
1	Yumeto Kanemaru	LHP	Kansai University
2	Seiya Yoshida	LHP	Seiyo Transportation Baseball Club
3	Shunta Mori	LHP	Toko Gakuen High School
4	Yuta Ishii	C	Nippon Life Baseball Club
5	Kōsuke Takahashi	LHP	Otaru Hokusho High School
6	Keito Arima	RHP	St. Catherine's Academy High School
Developmental Player Draft
1	Naiki Nakamura	INF	Miyazaki Prefectural Miyazaki Commercial High School
2	Kenya Inoue	RHP	Kagoshima Jitsugyō High School

=== Fukuoka SoftBank Hawks ===
Round	Player name	Position	Team
1	Taito Murakami	RHP	Kobe Koryo Gakuen High School
2	Yudai Shoji	INF	Kanagawa University
3	Shun Antoku	RHP	Fuji University
4	Shinjirō Uno	INF	Waseda Jitsugyo High School
5	Sōma Ishimi	INF	Aichi Institute of Technology Meiden High School
6	Shunsuke Iwasaki	RHP	Toyo University
Developmental Player Draft
1	Ryo Furukawa*	RHP	Nihon Gauken High School
2	Zairen Sobukawa	INF	Hamamatsu Commercial High School
3	Sou Ohtomo	C	Ibaraki Astro Planets
4	Yūki Hirose	INF	Municipal Matsudo High School
5	Shinichirō Kawano	LHP	Miyakazi Gakuen High School
6	Tōya Kawaguchi	RHP	Tokushima Indigo Socks
7	Kenshirō Tsukayama	RHP	Kobe International University Affiliated High School
8	Yūta Aihara	RHP	Sendai University
9	Kōichirō Okada	RHP	Osaka University of Commerce
10	Kōha Gyofu	OF	Tohoku Fukushi University
11	Hayato Kinoshita	OF	Chiba University of Economics Affiliated High School
12	Taiga Kumagai	LHP	Toryo High School
13	Dan Shioji	RHP	Ishikawa Prefectural Monzen High School

=== Hanshin Tigers ===
Round	Player name	Position	Team
1	Takato Ihara	LHP	NTT West Japan Baseball Club
2	Yuki Kesamaru	RHP	Hōtoku Gakuen High School
3	Rito Kinoshita	RHP	Kyushu Mitsubishi Motors Baseball Club
4	Hayato Machida	C	Saitama Musashi Heat Bears
5	Taiyo Sano	INF	Toyama GRN Thunderbirds
Developmental Player Draft
1	Taisei Kudo	RHP	Tokushima Indigo Socks
2	Rinshiro Shimamura	C	Kōchi Fighting Dogs
3	Daiki Hayakawa	RHP	Kufu HAYATE Ventures Shizuoka
4	Toshiaki Kawasaki	INF	Ishikawa Million Stars

=== Hiroshima Toyo Carp ===
Round	Player name	Position	Team
1	Tai Sasaki	INF	Aoyama Gakuin University
2	Ryūnosuke Satō	LHP	Fuji University
3	Shun Okamoto	RHP	Konan University
4	Yuto Watanabe	INF	Fuji University
5	Harun Kikuchi	RHP	Chiba Gakugei High School
Developmental Player Draft
1	Tsubasa Kobune	RHP	Chitoku High School
2	Kaito Takeshita	LHP	Tsuruga Kehi High School
3	Toshiki Yasutake	C	Shizuoka University

=== Hokkaido Nippon-Ham Fighters ===
Round	Player name	Position	Team
1	Reo Shibata	RHP	Fukuoka University Ohori High School
2	Ryūsei Fujita	LHP	Tokai University Sagami High School
3	Tamon Asari	RHP	Meiji University
4	Daiki Shimizu	RHP	Gunma Prefectural Maebashi Commercial High School
5	Shū Yamagata	INF	Waseda University
6	Kōtarō Yamashiro	RHP	Hosei University
Developmental Player Draft
1	Sorato Kawakatsu	RHP	Seiko Gakuin High School
2	Junki Shibuya	LHP	Hokkaido Obihiro Agricultural High School

=== Orix Buffaloes ===
Round	Player name	Position	Team
1	Yūsuke Mugitani	OF	Fuji University
2	Naruki Teranishi	RHP	Nippon Sport Science University
3	Reo Yamaguchi	RHP	Sendai Ikuei Gakuen Senior High School
4	Ryōma Yamanaka	C	Mitsubishi Heavy Industries East Baseball Club
5	Reiji Higashiyama	RHP	ENEOS Baseball Club
6	Raiku Katayama	RHP	NTT East Japan Baseball Club
Developmental Player Draft
1	Tomoki Imasaka	INF	Osaka Gakuin University High School
2	Musashi Shimizu	INF	Tochigi Golden Braves
3	Taiga Uehara	RHP	Hanasaki Tokuei High School
4	Seiichi Teramoto	OF	Hiroshima University of Economics
5	Kōsuke Tajima	C	Shinano Grandserows
6	Kento Inui	RHP	Kasumigaura High School

=== Saitama Seibu Lions ===
Round	Player name	Position	Team
1	Hiroto Saitō	INF	Kanazawa High School
2	Seiya Watanabe	OF	Osaka University of Commerce
3	Shōma Kariu	RHP	Oita Prefectural Saiki Kakujo High School
4	Lin Kuan-Chen	OF	Japan University of Economics
5	Hibiki Shinohara	RHP	Fukui University of Technology Affiliated Fukui High School
6	Haruki Tatsuyama	C	Enagic Sports High School
7	Teruki Koga	INF	Chikuma River Baseball Club
Developmental Player Draft
1	Yamato Fuji	LHP	Omiya Higashi High School
2	Taiyō Satō	INF	Kanagawa University
3	Ramal Geevin Ratanayake	INF	Osaka Tōin High School
4	Sou Satoh	LHP	Seisa Dohto University
5	Haruto Sawada	OF	Kyoto International High School
6	Haruma Fukuo	INF	Ishikawa High School (School Corporation)
7	Okem Mei Umebinyuo	OF	Asahikawa-shihō High School

=== Tohoku Rakuten Golden Eagles ===
Round	Player name	Position	Team
1	Rui Muneyama	INF	Meiji University
2	Kazuto Tokuyama	LHP	International Pacific University
3	Haruto Nakagomi	RHP	Tokushima Indigo Socks
4	Masahiro Ehara	RHP	Nippon Steel Stainless Baseball Club
5	Tsubasa Yoshinoh	OF	Waseda University
6	Yang Po-hsiang	INF	Ibaraki Astro Planets
Developmental Player Draft
1	Yūya Kishimoto	INF	Nara University High School

=== Tokyo Yakult Swallows ===
Round	Player name	Position	Team
1	Yuto Nakamura	RHP	Aichi Institute of Technology
2	Nikita Moiseev	OF	Toyokawa High School
3	Kota Shoji	LHP	Sega Sammy Baseball Club
4	Haruto Tanaka	INF	Takasaki University of Health and Welfare Takasaki High School
5	Taijiro Yano	C	Ehime Mandarin Pirates
Developmental Player Draft
1	Tatsunori Negishi	INF	North Carolina A&T
2	Yu Hirosawa	RHP	Ehime Mandarin Pirates
3	Shunsuke Shimokawa	RHP	Niigata Albirex Baseball Club
4	Ryunosuke Matsumoto	C	Sakai Shrikes

=== Yokohama DeNA BayStars ===
Round	Player name	Position	Team
1	Yu Takeda	RHP	Mitsubishi Heavy Industries West Baseball Club
2	Kentaro Shinogi	RHP	Hosei University
3	Hibiki Katoh	INF	Tokushima Indigo Socks
4	Naoki Wakamatsu	RHP	Kochi Fighting Dogs
5	Manato Tanai	INF	Okayama Sanyo High School
6	Kasuga Sakaguchi	RHP	Kokugakuin University
Developmental Player Draft
1	Daiki Kobari	OF	Nihon University Tsurugaoka High School
2	Haru Yoshioka	RHP	Tokushima Prefectural Ananhikari High School
3	Kōki Kanabuchi	LHP	Hachinohe Institute of Technology's First High School

=== Yomiuri Giants ===
Round	Player name	Position	Team
1	Yusei Ishizuka	INF	Hanasaki Tokuei High School
2	Shunsuke Urata	INF	Kyushu Industrial University
3	Yū Aramaki	INF	Jobu University
4	Juza Ishida	RHP	Hokusei Gakuen University Affiliated High School
5	Shunsuke Miyahara	LHP	Tokai University Shizuoka Campus
Developmental Player Draft
1	Tatsuya Sakamoto	C	Fuji University
2	Shotaro Horie	RHP	Bunsei University of Art Affiliated High School
3	Keishin Suzuki	RHP	Yokohama So-Gakukan High School
4	Shido Fukita	RHP	Hirosaki Gakuin Seiai High School
5	Ayumu Nishikawa	LHP	Yamamura Gauken High School
6	Raia Takeshita	INF	Meitoku Gijuku High School

Preceded by **2023**	**Nippon Professional Baseball draft**	Succeeded by **2025**
