= Shun Takayama =

Japanese baseball player (born 1993)

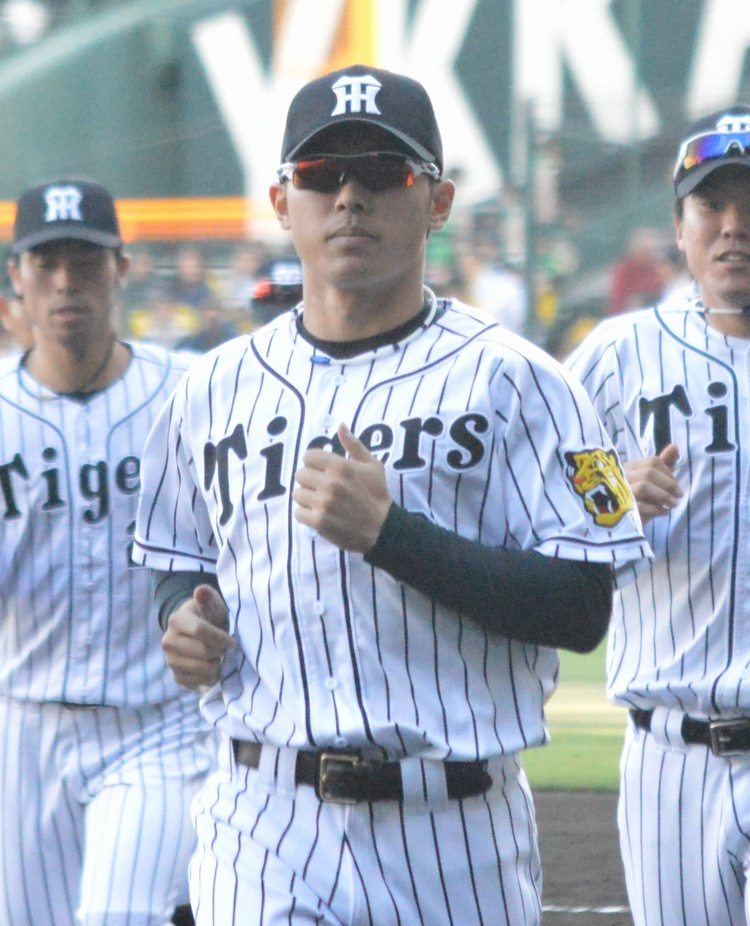
- Takayama with the Hanshin Tigers

Oisix Niigata Albirex – No. 9
- Outfielder
- Born: April 18, 1993 (age 32)
- Bats: Left Throws: Right

NPB debut
- March 25, 2016, for the Hanshin Tigers

NPB statistics (through 2023 season)
- Batting average: .250
- Home runs: 20
- Runs batted in: 135
- Stolen Bases: 23
- Stats at Baseball Reference

Teams
- Hanshin Tigers (2016–2023)

Career highlights and awards
- 1× NPB All-Star (2016); 2016 Central League Rookie of the Year

Shun Takayama (髙山 俊, Takayama Shun; born April 18, 1993 in Funabashi, Chiba) is a Japanese professional baseball outfielder for the Hanshin Tigers in Japan's Nippon Professional Baseball.

== Early baseball career ==
Born in Nagano prefecture, Shun's family used to move from one prefecture to another, along with the transfer of his father who works for a major securities company. When he was about to enter grade school, his family decided to move from Wakayama and settle down in his father's hometown in Funabashi City.。

During his first grade, he was scouted by a little league coach when he was seen playing catch-ball with his father in a neighboring playground. He became a full-fledged player in 6th grade, where he played the positions of outfielder, pitcher and catcher, and even appeared in national tournaments. Later, he doubled as an outfielder and pitcher for the Nanabayashi Junior High, where he also placed 4th in the 200-meter run during a prefectural athletics tournament.

As a freshman in Tokyo's Nichidai Daisan High, he batted lead-off in the Tokyo City tournament and averaged at 0.435. In the same tournament on his 2nd year, he batted at 0.432, drove in 13 RBIs including 4 home runs, and helped his team win the championship. He played the clean-up role in the 2011 Summer Koshien final where he homered and drove in five runs against Kōsei Gakuin, earning his team the title (11-0). He recorded 32 home runs in his entire high school career.

He secured the permanent post as outfielder and clean-up hitter upon entering Meiji University, where he recorded 20 hits (.417 BA) in his 1st year at the Tokyo Big6 Baseball League. He was awarded Best Nine for 2 years in a row, and in his 3rd year, he broke the league's all-time total hits record of 127 hits (Shigeru Takada of Meiji U, 1967) when he finished with 131 hits. In all of his 102 league games, he averaged at .324, batted in 45 runs, 8 of which were over the fence, and grabbed the Best Nine award 6 times.

He also participated for the baseball event in the 2015 Summer Universiade, where Japan won the gold medal.

== Hanshin Tigers ==
He was the Tiger's and Swallow's 1st pick at the 2015 NPB Draft, where Manager Kanemoto drew the winning ballot. He signed with the Tigers for a contract of 100 million yen, a signing bonus of 50 million, and an annual salary of 15 million. He was given Matt Murton's former jersey number, 9.

2016

Takayama had 53 plate appearances during the pre-season spring training and hit .327 with a .744 on-base plus slugging percentage.

Due to his consistent performance at the plate, Manager Kanemoto allowed him to debut as a starter on the March 25 opening day match against the Dragons, making him the first Tiger rookie to bat lead-off since Katsuhiko Nakamura in 1972. He did not disappoint when he delivered a left outfield hit from Yudai Ono's 142 km/h fastball, making him the first ever rookie in team history to notch a hit on his first at-bat in an opening day match. On March 31, he hit his first home run and became the first Hanshin rookie to hit a lead-off home run since Tomochika Tsuboi in 1998. This also made him the 2nd rookie in NPB history to hit his first career home run off the game's first pitch. Afterwards, he went on a 10-game hitting streak until mid-April, but was removed from the line-up on April 16 after he felt tightness in the right elbow. On April 22, he recorded his 3rd four-hit game and became the 4th NPB drafted rookie to collect three four-hit games in their first year, and the only one to accomplish the feat before the end of April.

On May 21, he recorded his fourth modasho (3 or more hits in one game) and first walk-off hit against Hiroshima to the delight of the home crowd at Koshien. He continued to perform well at the plate in his subsequent outings, and this earned him a spot in the mid-season All Star Games, a feat accomplished by only one other Hanshin rookie in history (Teruyoshi Kuji in 1992).
