= Teruyoshi =

- Gender: Male

Origin
- Origin: Japanese
- Meaning: Different meanings depending on the kanji used

Teruyoshi (written: 輝良, 輝悦, 輝吉, 晃嘉, 昭慶 or 光良) is a masculine Japanese given name. Notable people with the name include:

- Teruyoshi Akiyama (秋山 輝吉; born 1971), Japanese sport shooter
- Ichijō Teruyoshi (一条 輝良; 1756–1795), Japanese kugyō
- Teruyoshi Ito (伊東 輝悦; born 1974), Japanese footballer
- Teruyoshi Nakano (中野 昭慶; born 1935), Japanese special effects director
- Tochinoumi Teruyoshi (栃ノ海 晃嘉; born 1938), Japanese sumo wrestler
- Teruyoshi Uchimura (内村 光良; born 1964), Japanese comedian
- Teruyoshi Kuji (久慈 照嘉; born 1969), Japanese former baseball player
- Teruyoshi Ishii (石井てるよし), Japanese director

== See also ==
- 24919 Teruyoshi, a main-belt minor planet
