= Takehiko =

- Gender: Male

Origin
- Origin: Japanese
- Meaning: Different meanings depending on the kanji used

Takehiko (written: 武彦, 毅彦, 雄彦 or 岳彦) is a masculine Japanese given name. Notable people with the name include:

- Asanowaka Takehiko (朝乃若 武彦) (born 1969), Japanese sumo wrestler
- Takehiko Bessho (別所 毅彦) (1922–1999), Japanese baseball player and manager
- Takehiko Endo (遠藤 武彦) (1938–2019), Japanese politician
- Takehiko Inoue (井上 雄彦) (born 1967), Japanese manga artist
- Takehiko Itō (伊東 岳彦), Japanese manga artist
- Takehiko Kawanishi (川西 武彦) (born 1938), Japanese footballer
- Takehiko Kobayakawa (小早川 毅彦) (born 1961), Japanese baseball player
- Kurushima Takehiko (久留島 武彦) (1874–1960), Japanese writer
- Takehiko Orimo (折茂 武彦; born 1970), Japanese basketball player
- Prince Yamashina Takehiko (山階宮 武彦王) (1898–1987), Japanese prince and Imperial Japanese Navy officer
