= Nippon Professional Baseball Rookie of the Year Award =

Annual baseball award

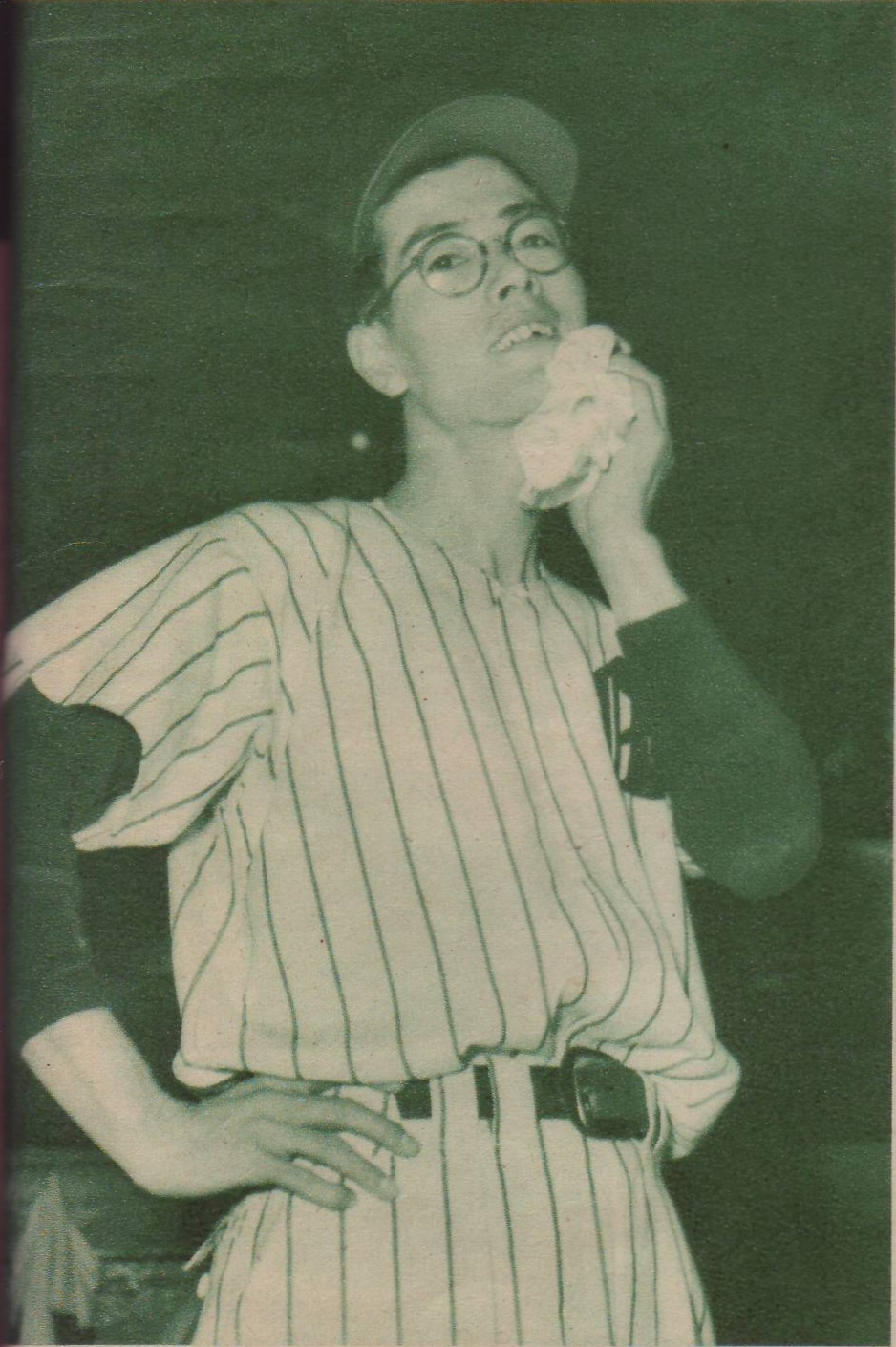
- Atsushi Aramaki, one of the inaugural winners in 1950
- Sport: Baseball
- League: Nippon Professional Baseball
- Awarded for: Best regular-season rookie in Pacific League and Central League

History
- First award: 1950
- Most recent: Kota Shoji (CL); Mishō Nishikawa (PL)

The Nippon Professional Baseball Rookie of the Year Award is an annual award given to two outstanding rookie players, one each for the Central League (CL) and Pacific League (PL). The award was established upon the creation of the NPB in 1950.

The most recent winners of the award are Kota Shoji of the Tokyo Yakult Swallows for the CL and Mishō Nishikawa of the Chiba Lotte Marines for the PL.

== Winners ==
=== Central League ===
Year	Player	Team	Position
1950	Nobuo Oshima	Shochiku Robins	P
1951	Kiyoshi Matsuda	Yomiuri Giants	P
1952	Takao Sato	Kokutetsu Swallows	SS
1953	Masatoshi Gondo	Taiyō-Shochiku Robins	P
1954	Tatsuro Hirooka	Yomiuri Giants	SS
1955	Kazunori Nishimura	Ōsaka Tigers	P
1956	Noboru Akiyama	Taiyō Whales	P
1957	Motoshi Fujita	Yomiuri Giants	P
1958	Shigeo Nagashima	Yomiuri Giants	3B
1959	Takeshi Kuwata	Taiyō Whales	3B
1960	Ritsuo Horimoto	Yomiuri Giants	P
1961	Hiroshi Gondo	Chunichi Dragons	P
1962	Kunio Jōnouchi	Yomiuri Giants	P
1963	Not awarded		
1964	Shigeyuki Takahashi	Taiyō Whales	P
1965	Not awarded		
1966	Tsuneo Horiuchi	Yomiuri Giants	P
1967	Shirō Takegami	Sankei Atoms	2B
1968	Shigeru Takada	Yomiuri Giants	OF
1969	Kōichi Tabuchi	Hanshin Tigers	C
1970	Kenichi Yazawa	Chunichi Dragons	OF
1971	Shitoshi Sekimoto	Yomiuri Giants	P
1972	Takeshi Yasuda	Yakult Atoms	P
1973	Not awarded		
1974	Yukio Fujinami	Chunichi Dragons	OF
1975	Not awarded		
1976	Yasushi Tao	Chunichi Dragons	OF
1977	Akio Saito	Taiyō Whales	P
1978	Mitsuo Sumi	Yomiuri Giants	P
1979	Kimiya Fujisawa	Chunichi Dragons	P
1980	Akinobu Okada	Hanshin Tigers	IF
1981	Tatsunori Hara	Yomiuri Giants	IF
1982	Tsunemi Tsuda	Hiroshima Toyo Carp	P
1983	Hiromi Makihara	Yomiuri Giants	P
1984	Takehiko Kobayakawa	Hiroshima Toyo Carp	IF
1985	Jun Kawabata	Hiroshima Toyo Carp	P
1986	Hiroshi Nagatomi	Hiroshima Toyo Carp	P
1987	Yukio Arai	Yakult Swallows	OF
1988	Kazuyoshi Tatsunami	Chunichi Dragons	SS
1989	Kenji Tomashino	Yakult Swallows	2B
1990	Tsuyoshi Yoda	Chunichi Dragons	P
1991	Koichi Morita	Chunichi Dragons	P
1992	Teruyoshi Kuji	Hanshin Tigers	SS
1993	Tomohito Ito	Yakult Swallows	P
1994	Keiichi Yabu	Hanshin Tigers	P
1995	Yasuyuki Yamauchi	Hiroshima Toyo Carp	P
1996	Toshihisa Nishi	Yomiuri Giants	3B
1997	Toshikazu Sawazaki	Hiroshima Toyo Carp	P
1998	Kenshin Kawakami	Chunichi Dragons	P
1999	Koji Uehara	Yomiuri Giants	P
2000	Tatsuhiko Kinjoh	Yokohama BayStars	3B
2001	Norihiro Akahoshi	Hanshin Tigers	OF
2002	Masanori Ishikawa	Yakult Swallows	P
2003	Hiroshi Kisanuki	Yomiuri Giants	P
2004	Ryo Kawashima	Yakult Swallows	P
2005	Norichika Aoki	Yakult Swallows	OF
2006	Eishin Soyogi	Hiroshima Toyo Carp	IF
2007	Keiji Uezono	Hanshin Tigers	P
2008	Tetsuya Yamaguchi	Yomiuri Giants	P
2009	Tetsuya Matsumoto	Yomiuri Giants	OF
2010	Hisayoshi Chono	Yomiuri Giants	OF
2011	Hirokazu Sawamura	Yomiuri Giants	P
2012	Yusuke Nomura	Hiroshima Toyo Carp	P
2013	Yasuhiro Ogawa	Tokyo Yakult Swallows	P
2014	Daichi Ohsera	Hiroshima Toyo Carp	P
2015	Yasuaki Yamasaki	Yokohama DeNA BayStars	P
2016	Shun Takayama	Hanshin Tigers	OF
2017	Yota Kyoda	Chunichi Dragons	IF
2018	Katsuki Azuma	Yokohama DeNA BayStars	P
2019	Munetaka Murakami	Tokyo Yakult Swallows	IF
2020	Masato Morishita	Hiroshima Toyo Carp	P
2021	Ryoji Kuribayashi	Hiroshima Toyo Carp	P
2022	Taisei Ota	Yomiuri Giants	P
2023	Shoki Murakami	Hanshin Tigers	P
2024	Hiromasa Funabasama	Yomiuri Giants	P
2025	Kota Shoji	Tokyo Yakult Swallows	P

=== Pacific League ===
Year	Player	Team	Position
1950	Atsushi Aramaki	Mainichi Orions	P
1951	Kazuo Kageyama	Nankai Hawks	3B
1952	Futoshi Nakanishi	Nishitetsu Lions	3B
1953	Yasumitsu Toyoda	Nishitetsu Lions	SS
1954	Motoji Takuwa	Nankai Hawks	P
1955	Kihachi Enomoto	Mainichi Orions	1B
1956	Kazuhisa Inao	Nishitetsu Lions	P
1957	Tamotsu Kimura	Nankai Hawks	P
1958	Tadashi Sugiura	Nankai Hawks	P
1959	Isao Harimoto	Toei Flyers	OF
1960	Not awarded		
1961	Toshiaki Tokuhisa	Kintetsu Buffaloes	P
1962	Yukio Ozaki	Toei Flyers	P
1963	Not awarded		
1964	Not awarded		
1965	Masaaki Ikenaga	Nishitetsu Lions	P
1966	Not awarded		
1967	Yoshimasa Takahashi	Toei Flyers	P
1968	Not awarded		
1969	Michiyo Arito	Lotte Orions	3B
1970	Michio Sato	Nankai Hawks	P
1971	Yasuo Minagawa	Toei Flyers	P
1972	Hajime Kato	Nishitetsu Lions	P
1973	Satoshi Niimi	Nittaku Home Flyers	P
1974	Masaharu Mitsui	Lotte Orions	P
1975	Takashi Yamaguchi	Hankyu Braves	P
1976	Manabu Fujita	Nankai Hawks	P
1977	Yoshinori Sato	Hankyu Braves	P
1978	Yukihiro Murakami	Nankai Hawks	P
1979	Hirohisa Matsunuma	Seibu Lions	P
1980	Isamu Kida	Nippon-Ham Fighters	P
1981	Hiromichi Ishige	Seibu Lions	SS
1982	Daijiro Oishi	Kintetsu Buffaloes	2B
1983	Tadami Futamura	Nippon-Ham Fighters	OF
1984	Hiromasa Fujita	Hankyu Braves	C
1985	Terumitsu Kumano	Hankyu Braves	OF
1986	Kazuhiro Kiyohara	Seibu Lions	1B
1987	Hideyuki Awano	Kintetsu Buffaloes	P
1988	Ryoji Moriyama	Seibu Lions	P
1989	Tsutomu Sakai	Orix Braves	P
1990	Hideo Nomo	Kintetsu Buffaloes	P
1991	Shigetoshi Hasegawa	Orix BlueWave	P
1992	Hiroshi Takamura	Kintetsu Buffaloes	P
1993	Kento Sugiyama	Seibu Lions	P
1994	Hidekazu Watanabe	Fukuoka Daiei Hawks	P
1995	Masafumi Hirai	Orix BlueWave	P
1996	Makoto Kaneko	Nippon-Ham Fighters	2B
1997	Makoto Kosaka	Chiba Lotte Marines	2B
1998	Tatsuya Ozeki	Seibu Lions	OF
1999	Daisuke Matsuzaka	Seibu Lions	P
2000	Not awarded		
2001	Masanobu Okubo	Orix BlueWave	P
2002	Itsuki Shoda	Nippon-Ham Fighters	P
2003	Tsuyoshi Wada	Fukuoka Daiei Hawks	P
2004	Koji Mise	Fukuoka Daiei Hawks	P
2005	Yasutomo Kubo	Chiba Lotte Marines	P
2006	Tomoya Yagi	Hokkaido Nippon-Ham Fighters	P
2007	Masahiro Tanaka	Tohoku Rakuten Golden Eagles	P
2008	Satoshi Komatsu	Orix Buffaloes	P
2009	Tadashi Settsu	Fukuoka SoftBank Hawks	P
2010	Ryo Sakakibara	Hokkaido Nippon-Ham Fighters	P
2011	Kazuhisa Makita	Saitama Seibu Lions	P
2012	Naoya Masuda	Chiba Lotte Marines	P
2013	Takahiro Norimoto	Tohoku Rakuten Golden Eagles	P
2014	Ayumu Ishikawa	Chiba Lotte Marines	P
2015	Kohei Arihara	Hokkaido Nippon-Ham Fighters	P
2016	Hirotoshi Takanashi	Hokkaido Nippon-Ham Fighters	P
2017	Sosuke Genda	Saitama Seibu Lions	IF
2018	Kazuki Tanaka	Tohoku Rakuten Golden Eagles	OF
2019	Rei Takahashi	Fukuoka SoftBank Hawks	P
2020	Kaima Taira	Saitama Seibu Lions	P
2021	Hiroya Miyagi	Orix Buffaloes	P
2022	Yoshinobu Mizukami	Saitama Seibu Lions	P
2023	Shunpeita Yamashita	Orix Buffaloes	P
2024	Natsuki Takeuchi	Saitama Seibu Lions	P
2025	Mishō Nishikawa	Chiba Lotte Marines	OF

== See also ==
- Nippon Professional Baseball § Awards
- Baseball awards § Japan
- List of Nippon Professional Baseball earned run average champions
