= Masanobu Okubo =

Japanese baseball player (born 1976)

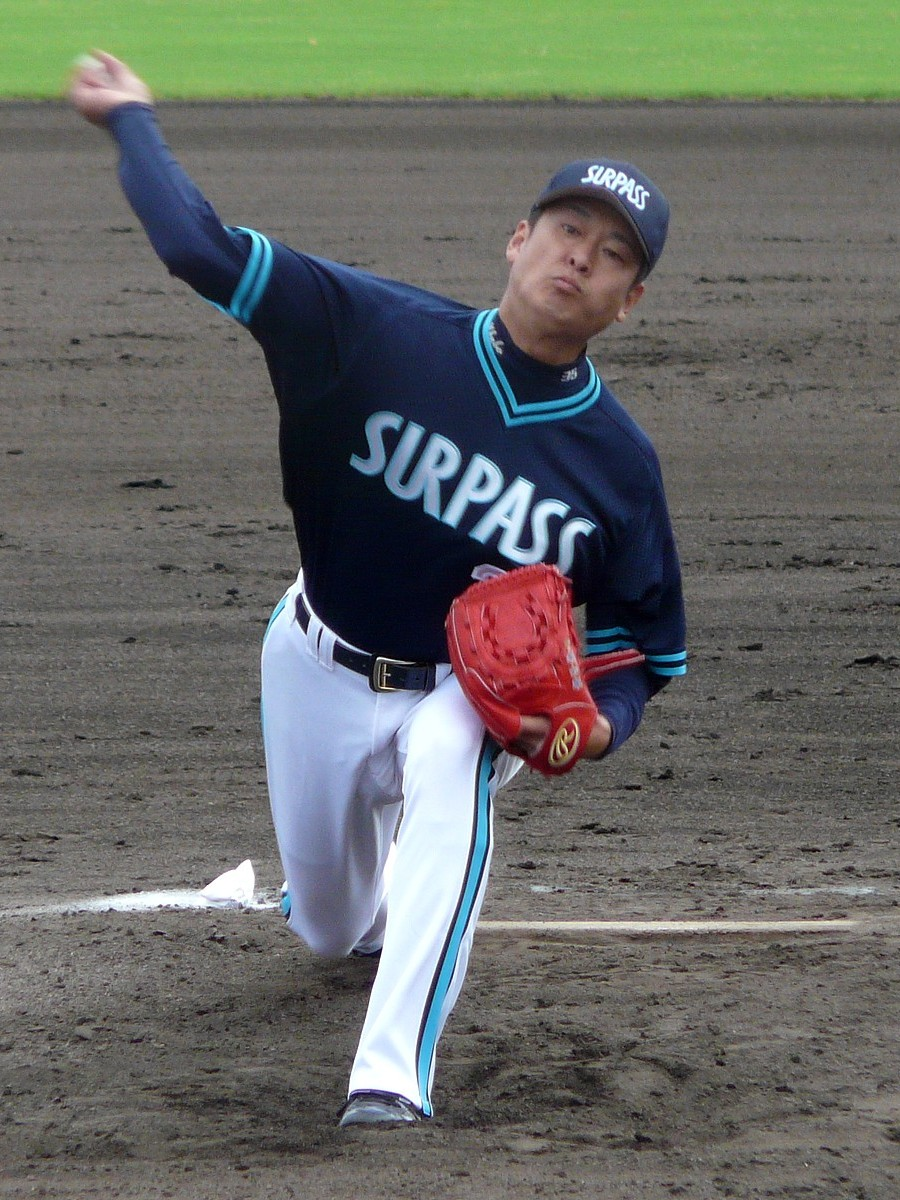
- Pitcher
- Born: September 13, 1976 (age 49); Hidaka District, Wakayama, Wakayama, Japan
- Batted: Right Threw: Right

NPB debut
- April 9, 2001, for the Orix BlueWave

Last NPB appearance
- May 29, 2010, for the Orix Buffaloes

NPB statistics (through 2010)
- Win–loss record: 16-20
- Saves: 63
- ERA: 3.23
- Strikeouts: 276

Teams
- Orix BlueWave/Orix Buffaloes (2001–2010)

Career highlights and awards
- 2001 Pacific League Rookie of the Year
- Last updated on: 8 February 2014

Masanobu Okubo (大久保 勝信; born September 13, 1976, in Hidaka District, Wakayama, Japan) is a former Nippon Professional Baseball pitcher.
