= Yasuo Minagawa =

Japanese baseball player (1947–2022)

- Pitcher
- Born: November 3, 1947; Hamamatsu, Shizuoka, Japan
- Died: December 19, 2022 (aged 75)
- Batted: Right Threw: Right

NPB debut
- April 11, 1971, for the Toei Flyers

Last appearance
- May 18, 1977, for the Hiroshima Toyo Carp

NPB statistics
- Win–loss: 26–28
- Earned run average: 3.45
- Strikeouts: 206
- Stats at Baseball Reference

Teams
- Toei Flyers/Nittaku Home Flyers/Nippon Ham Fighters (1971–1976); Hiroshima Toyo Carp (1977)

Career highlights and awards
- Pacific League Rookie of the Year (1971)

Yasuo Minagawa (皆川 康夫, Minagawa Yasuo; November 3, 1947 – December 19, 2022) was a Japanese professional baseball pitcher. He played in Nippon Professional Baseball (NPB) for the Toei Flyers/Nittaku Home Flyers/Nippon Ham Fighters and the Hiroshima Toyo Carp.
