= Tsutomu Sakai =

Japanese baseball player and coach

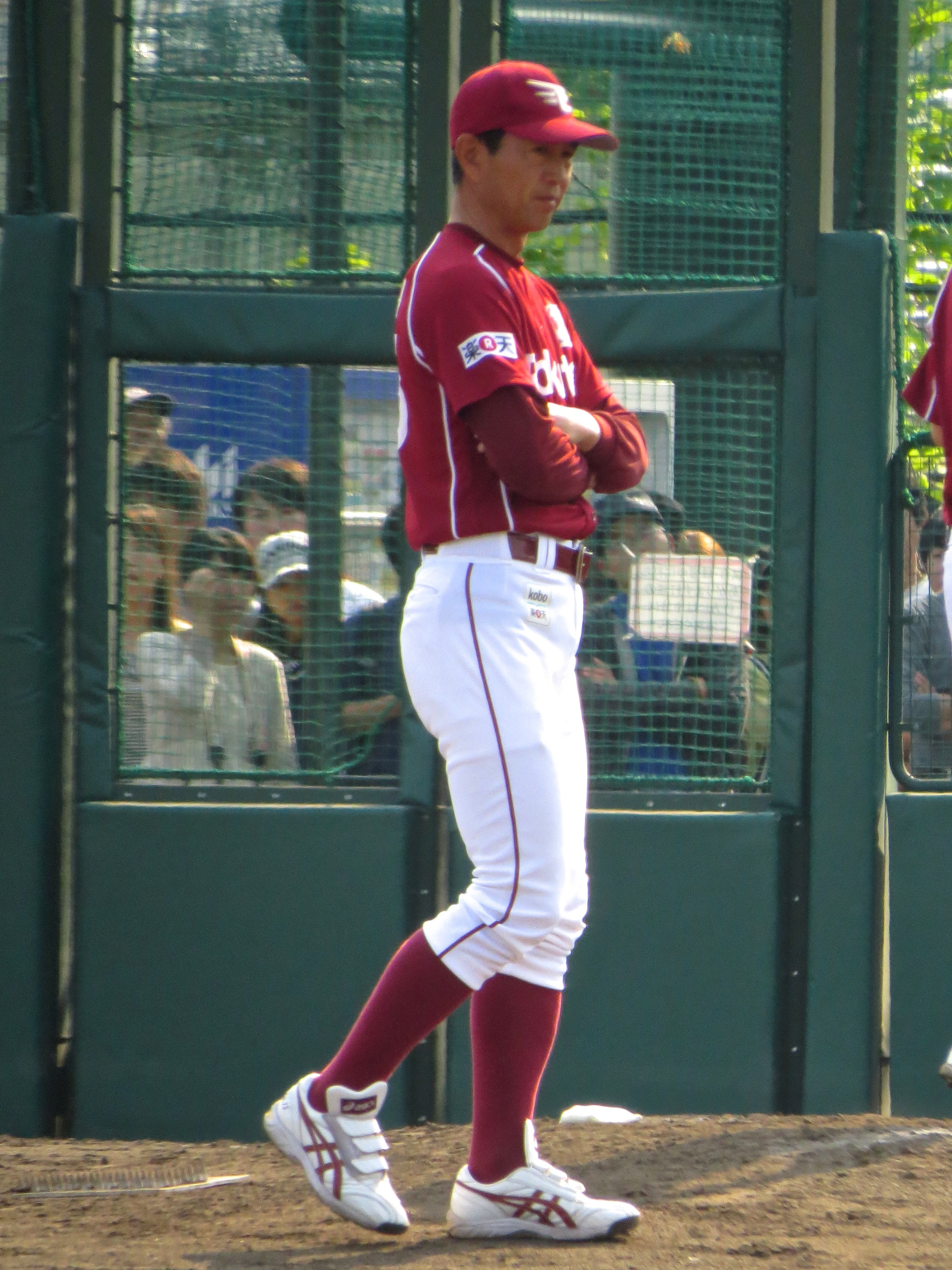
- Pitcher / Coach
- Born: June 27, 1963 (age 62); Funabashi, Chiba, Japan
- Batted: Right Threw: Right

NPB debut
- April 13, 1989, for the Orix Braves

Last NPB appearance
- 1993, for the Orix BlueWave

NPB statistics (through 1996)
- Win–loss record: 33-31
- Saves: 14
- ERA: 3.78
- Strikeouts: 395
- Stats at Baseball Reference

Teams
- As player: Orix Braves/Orix BlueWave (1989–1996); As coach: Orix BlueWave/Orix Buffaloes (2001–2003, 2008–2010, 2016–2021); Tohoku Rakuten Golden Eagles (2012–2015)

Career highlights and awards
- 1× Japan Series champion (1996); 1× NPB All-Star (1992); 1989 Pacific League Rookie of the Year
- Last updated on: 5 December 2021

Tsutomu Sakai (酒井 勉, born June 27, 1963, in Funabashi, Chiba, Japan) is a former Nippon Professional Baseball pitcher.
