= Shun Okamoto =

Japanese baseball player (born 2002)

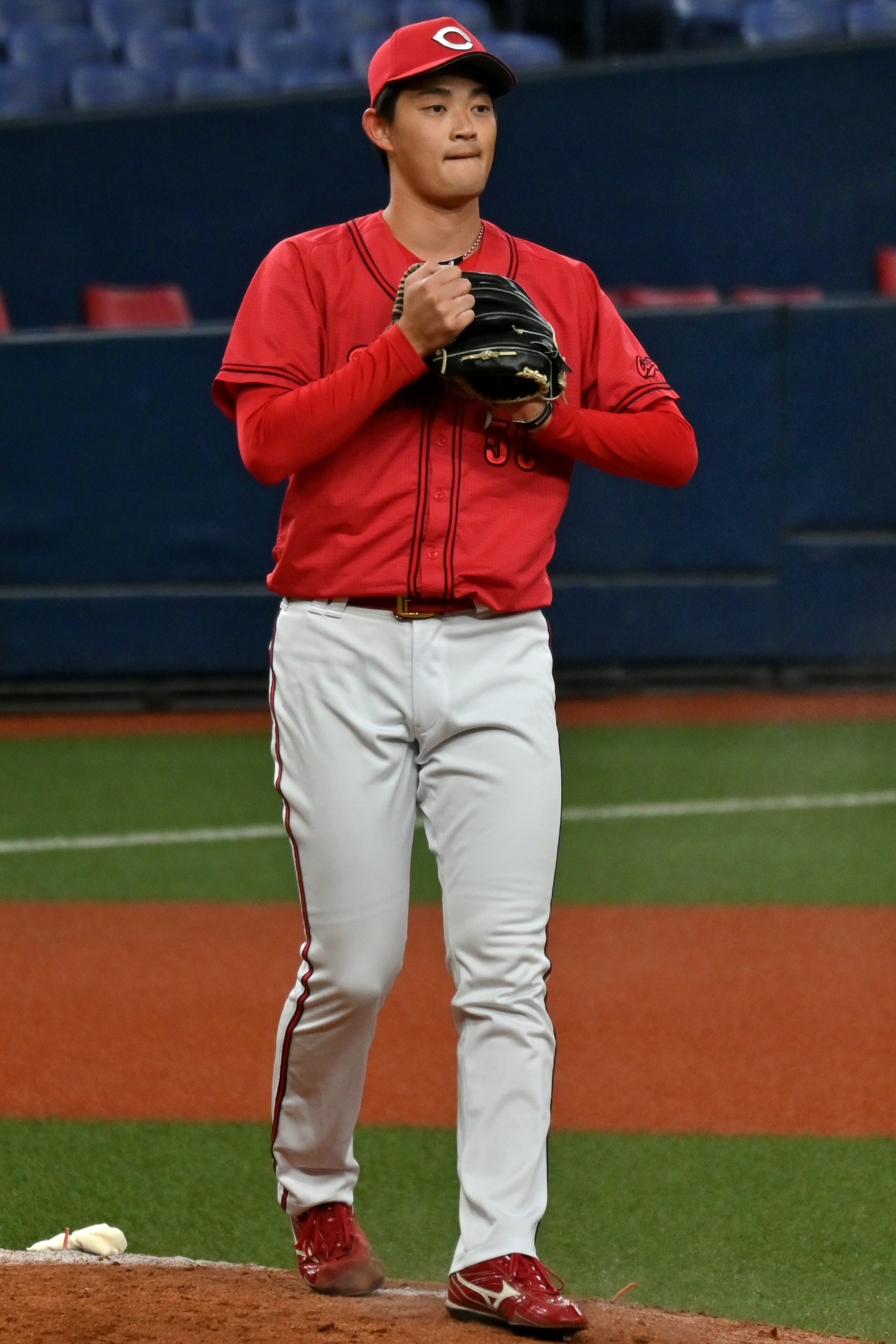

Hiroshima Toyo Carp – No. 53
- pitcher
- Born: June 12, 2002 (age 24); Katsuura, Tokushima, Japan
- Bats: Left Throws: Right

NPB debut
- March 28, 2025, for the Hiroshima Toyo Carp

NPB statistics (through 2025 season)
- Win–loss record: 1–1
- Earned run average: 2.88
- Strikeouts: 37
- Saves: 0
- Holds: 1

Teams
- Hiroshima Toyo Carp (2025–present)

Shun Okamoto (岡本 駿, Okamoto Shun; extra) born June 12, 2002 in Katsuura, Katsuura District, Tokushima, Japan is a Japanese professional baseball pitcher for the Hiroshima Toyo Carp of Nippon Professional Baseball (NPB).

== Career ==
=== Amateur ===
Okamoto started playing baseball for the Katsuura Tigers Sports Boys' Team when he was in second grade at Yokose Elementary School. He was a member of the Japanese-style baseball Club when he was a student at Katsuura Junior High School. At Jonan High School, he became a bench member from the fall of his first year. He was primarily a shortstop infielder in high school, but also pitched.

Okamoto then enrolled in the Faculty of business at Konan University. He decided to focus on pitching in college. In the fall of his freshman year, he became the winning pitcher in a league game for the first time, and also recording a shutout against Osaka University of Health and Sport Sciences. He recorded a shutout in the opening game of the 2024 spring league against Kansai Gaidai University, but only pitched in two games that spring. He returned to the team before the fall league. He pitched a total of 186 innings in his collegiate career. He was 14-12 with 143 strikeouts.

Okamoto drafted in the 3rd round of the 2024 Nippon Professional Baseball draft, selected by the Hiroshima Toyo Carp. He signed a tentative contract with the team on November 14th. He became the first professional baseball player to graduate from Konan University.

=== Professional ===
In 2025, Okamoto pitched in a practice game against the Chiba Lotte Marines, and struck out three consecutive batters. He made his professional debut in the opening game against the Hanshin Tigers on March 28th. On April 20th, Okamoto's pitch hit by Seishirō Sakamoto's head, resulting in an ejection for dangerous pitch. On May 13th, he recorded his first professional winning pitcher against the Yomiuri Giants.

== Player profile ==
Okamoto is a right right-handed pitcher. He throws a four-seam fastball topping out at 151 km/h, a slider, a cut fastball, a changeup, a two-seam fastball, and a forkball. In 2025, Takahiro Arai said about his two-seam fastball: "His two-seam fastball is hard to distinguish from a split-finger fastball."

Regarding his batting, Okamoto said, "I'm good at hitting to the opposite field and center field."

== Personal life ==
For his university graduation thesis, he wrote about the Carp's business history.
