= Hidekazu Watanabe =

Japanese baseball player (born 1971)

- Pitcher
- Born: July 13, 1971; Shimodate, Ibaraki, Japan
- Batted: Right Threw: Right

NPB debut
- April 13, 1994, for the Fukuoka Daiei Hawks

Last appearance
- May 27, 2001, for the Fukuoka Daiei Hawks

NPB statistics (through 2001)
- Win–loss record: 27–30
- Earned run average: 3.89
- Strikeouts: 345
- Saves: 0

Teams
- As player: Fukuoka Daiei Hawks (1994–2001)

Career highlights and awards
- Pacific League Rookie of the Year (1994)

Hidekazu Watanabe (渡辺 秀一, Watanabe Hidekazu; born July 13, 1971) is a Japanese former Nippon Professional Baseball pitcher. He pitched in a series of exhibition games against the United States Olympic baseball team in 1992. He also played a season of Hawaii Winter Baseball with the Kauai Emeralds in 1994. He pleaded guilty to charges of tax evasion in 1997, with other members of the Fukuoka Daiei Hawks.
