= Takato Ihara =

Japanese baseball player (born 2000)

Ihara Takato
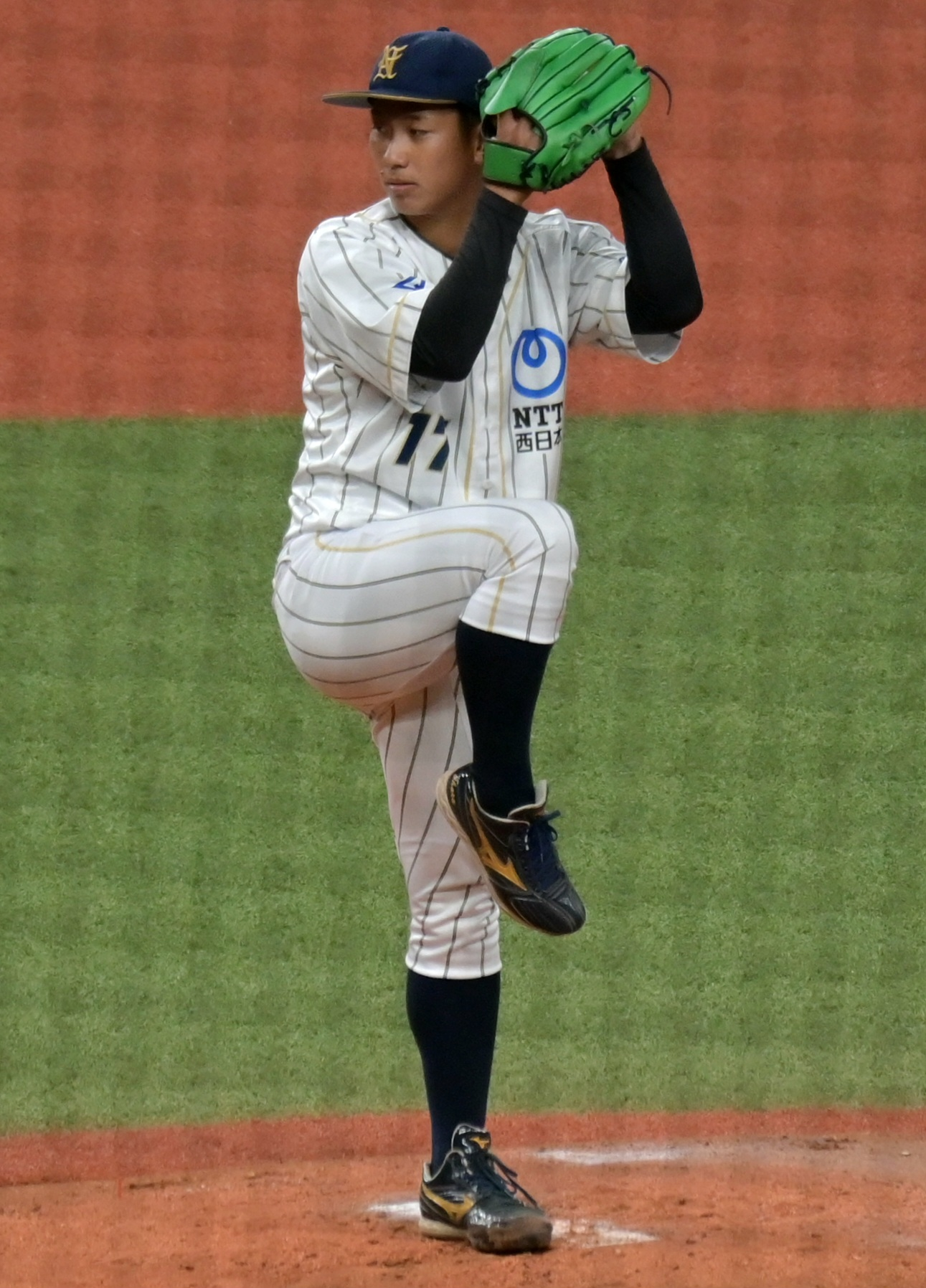
- Ihara pitching for NTT West

Hanshin Tigers – No. 18
- Pitcher
- Born: August 7, 2000 (age 26); Kashihara, Nara
- Bats: Left Throws: Left

NPB debut
- March 30, 2025, for the Hanshin Tigers

NPB statistics (through 2025 season)
- Win–loss: 5-7
- Earned run average: 2.29
- Strikeout: 81
- Saves: 0
- Holds: 1

Teams
- Hanshin Tigers (2025–present)

Takato Ihara (伊原 陵人, Ihara Takato; born August 7, 2000) is a Japanese professional baseball pitcher for the Hanshin Tigers of Nippon Professional Baseball (NPB).

== Amateur career ==
Influenced by his father and older brother, Takato started playing baseball in 1st grade and played in little league games all throughout grade school. He decided to stop in junior high however after experiencing the hardships and pressure that came with playing the game, and opted to join the judo club instead. While he took judo seriously, catching glimpses of other kids practicing baseball in a nearby field on his way home everyday somehow reignited his passion for the game, and he decided to switch to the softball club in his sophomore year.

He entered Chiben Gakuen High School, a known baseball powerhouse in Nara Prefecture and became the team's ace pitcher in his 3rd year. He led his team all the way to the 3rd round of the 2018 Spring Koshien national tournaments where he pitched 9 innings against Sohseikan High with only one earned run, but unfortunately got defeated in the succeeding innings. They also got defeated in the prefectural semi-finals in the following summer and didn't make it to the summer tournaments.

He then enrolled in Osaka University of Commerce to participate in the Kansai Six Baseball League games, and was awarded the league's best pitcher in the autumn of his 2nd year. The following spring, he notched a 5-0 record with 0.28 ERA and was awarded Best Nine. He finished university with 15 wins and 1 loss with an ERA of 0.91 in 36 appearances.

When he went undrafted after graduation, he joined the industrial leagues to play under NTT West Japan and played in the Intercity Baseball Tournaments for 2 years (4 games, 20 innings, 4.05 ERA).

== Hanshin Tigers ==
He was the 1st round pick of the Hanshin Tigers in 2024 Nippon Professional Baseball draft (1st alternative choice after they lost the lottery for Yumeto Kanemaru). He inked a 100 million yen contract and a 30 million signing bonus with the Tigers for a 16 million yen annual salary, and was assigned the jersey number 18.

== Playing style ==
A 170cm tall southpaw pitcher with three-quarters delivery, he pitches a four-seam fastball in the 140 km/h (87 mph) range as his main pitch (maxed at 149 km/h (93 mph)).
