= Hiromasa Funabasama =

Japanese baseball player (born 1996)

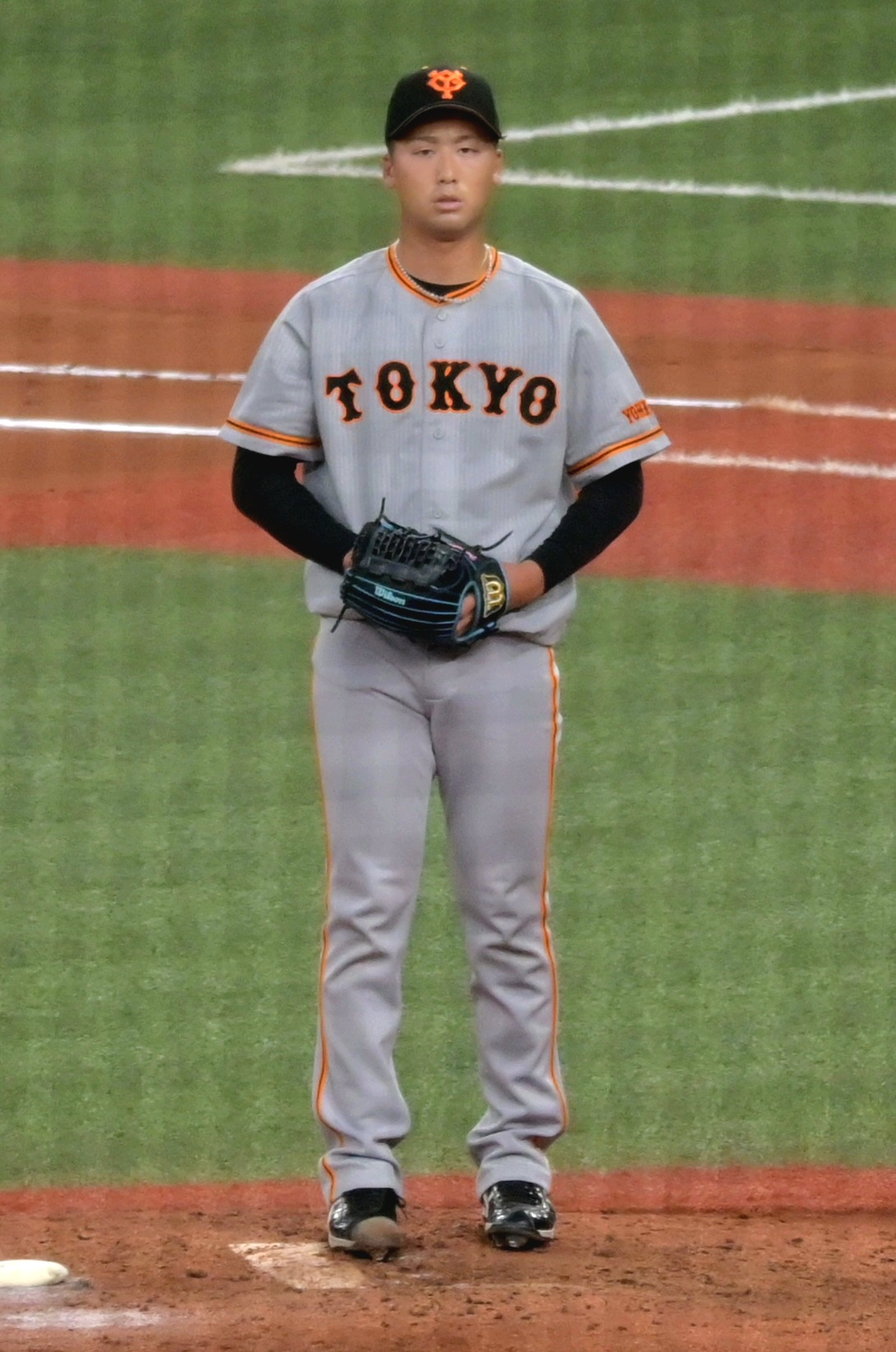
- Funabasama with the Yomiuri Giants

Yomiuri Giants – No. 58
- Pitcher
- Born: October 16, 1996 (age 29); Katta, Miyagi, Japan
- Bats: Left Throws: Right

NPB debut
- March 31, 2023, for the Yomiuri Giants

Career statistics (through 2024 season)
- Win–loss record: 7–1
- Earned Run Average: 2.51
- Strikeouts: 56
- Saves: 0
- Holds: 30

Teams
- Yomiuri Giants (2023–present)

Career highlights and awards
- Central League Rookie of the Year (2024)

Hiromasa Funabasama (船迫 大雅, Funabasama Hiromasa; born October 16, 1996) is a Japanese professional baseball pitcher for the Yomiuri Giants of Nippon Professional Baseball (NPB).

== Career ==
In 2024, Funabasama made 51 appearances for Yomiuri, compiling a 4–0 record and 2.37 ERA with 23 strikeouts across 38 innings of work. Following the season, Funabasama was named the Central League Rookie of the Year.
