= Yōta Kyōda =

Japanese baseball player (born 1994)

Yōta Kyōda 京田 陽太
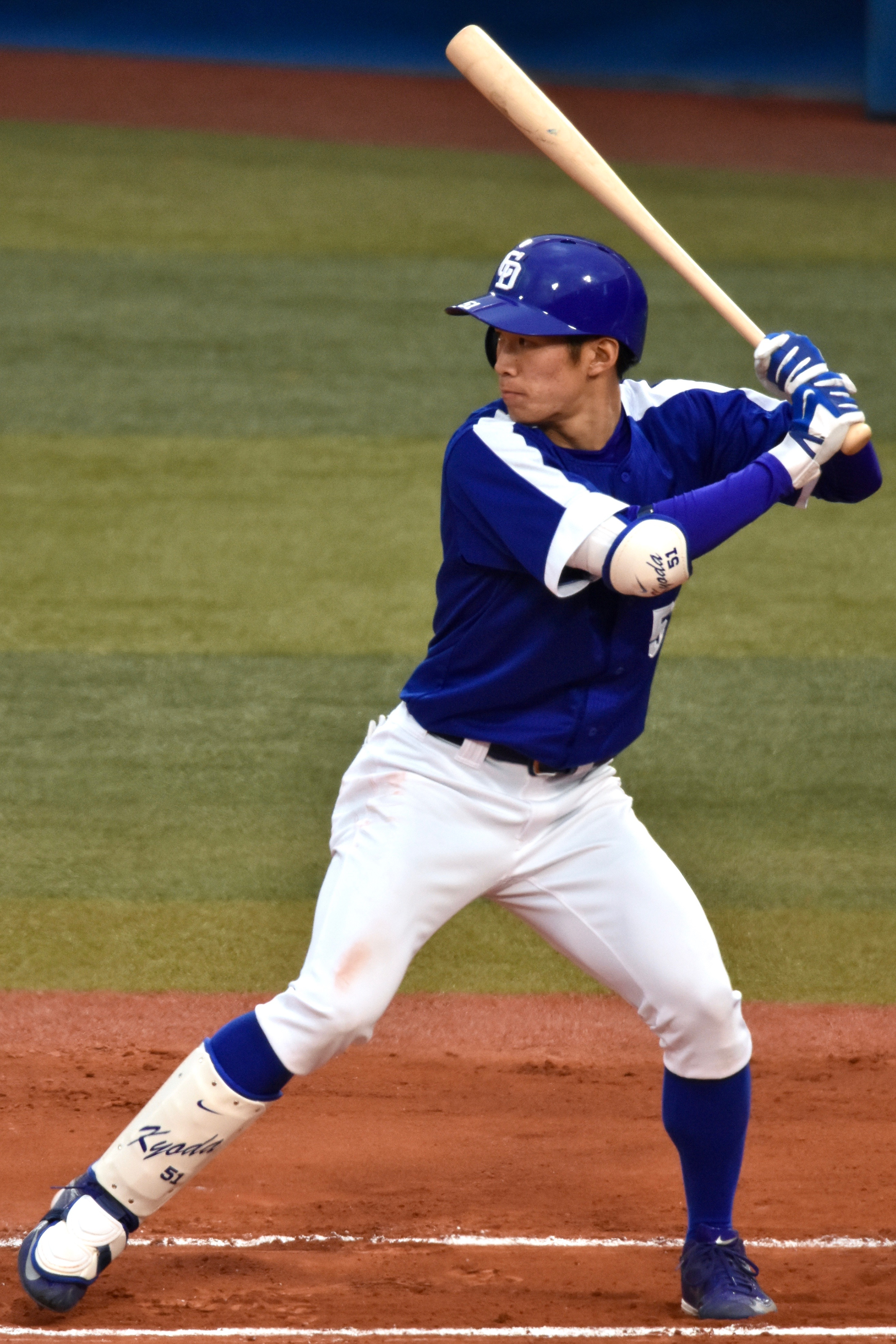

Yokohama DeNA BayStars – No. 9
- Infielder
- Born: April 20, 1994 (age 32); Nomi, Ishikawa, Japan
- Bats: Left Throws: Right

NPB debut
- March 31, 2017, for the Chunichi Dragons

NPB statistics (through 2023 season)
- Batting average: .245
- Home runs: 23
- Runs batted in: 190
- Stolen bases: 78
- Stats at Baseball Reference

Teams
- Chunichi Dragons (2017–2022); Yokohama DeNA BayStars (2023–present)

Career highlights and awards
- Japan Series champion (2024); 2017 Central League Rookie of the Year; NPB All-Star selection (2019)

Yōta Kyōda (京田 陽太, Kyōda Yōta; born April 20, 1994 in Nomi, Ishikawa, Japan) is a Japanese professional baseball infielder for the Yokohama DeNA BayStars of Nippon Professional Baseball (NPB). He has previously played in NPB for the Chunichi Dragons.

Kyōda was the 2017 Central League Rookie of the Year and was previously the player's representative for the Dragons.

== Career ==
=== Chunichi Dragons ===
On October 20, 2016, Kyōda was selected as the 2nd draft pick for the Chunichi Dragons at the 2016 NPB Draft and on 26 November signed a provisional contract with a ¥85,000,000 sign-on bonus and a ¥12,000,000 yearly salary.

On February 27, 2019, he was selected for Japan national baseball team at the 2019 exhibition games against Mexico.

=== Yokohama DeNA BayStars ===
On November 18, 2022, Kyōda was traded to the Yokohama DeNA BayStars in exchange for Yoshiki Sunada.
