= Tatsuhiko Kinjō =

Zainichi Korean baseball player (born 1976)

Tatsuhiko Kinjoh
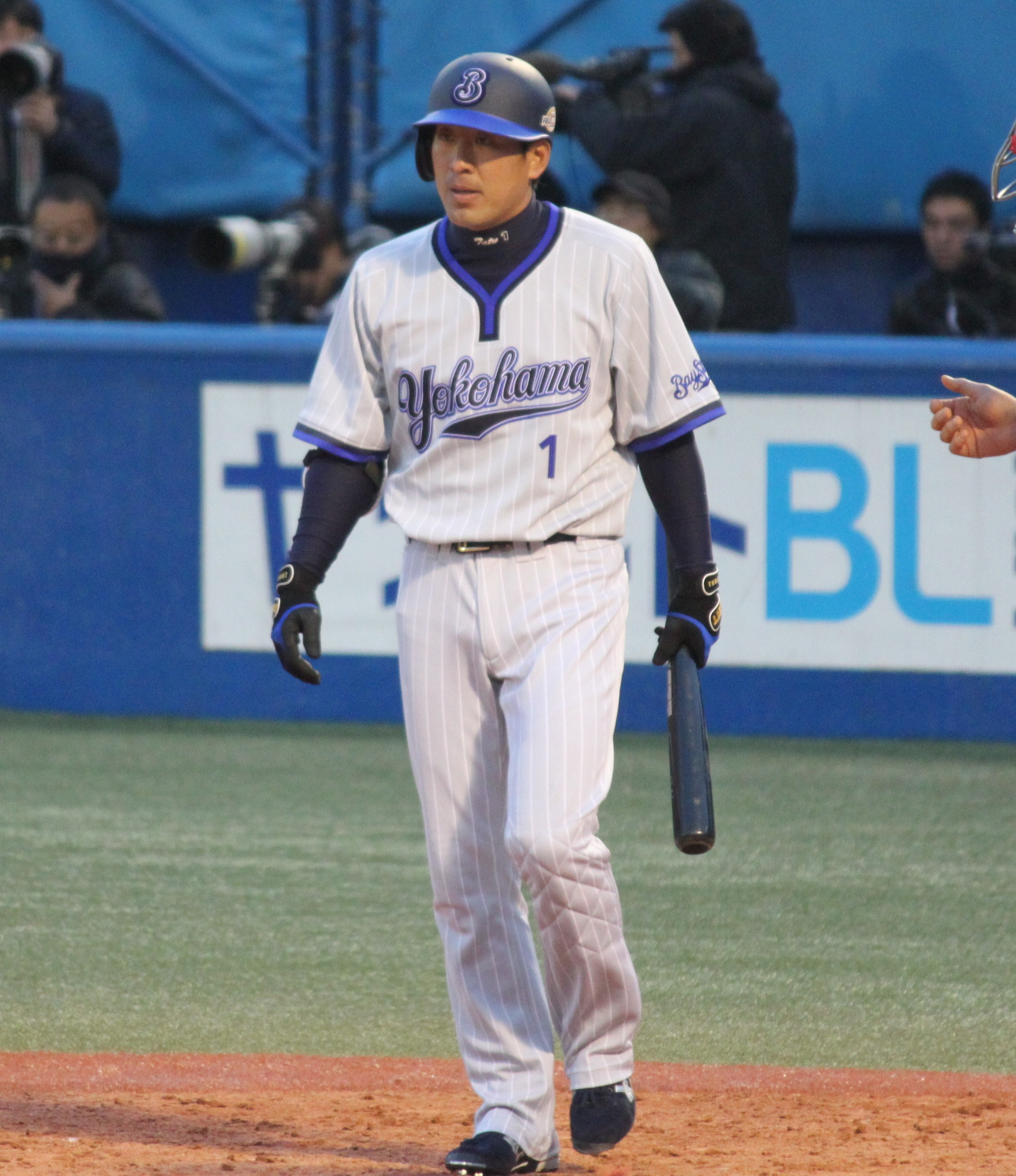

Yomiuri Giants – No. 103
- Outfielder / Coach
- Born: Kim Yong-eon; July 27, 1976 (age 49); Osaka, Japan
- Batted: Switch Threw: Right

NPB debut
- October 3, 1999, for the Yokohama BayStars

Last NPB appearance
- June 10, 2015, for the Yomiuri Giants

Career statistics
- Batting average: .278
- Home runs: 104
- Runs batted in: 592
- Hits: 1,648
- Stats at Baseball Reference

Teams
- As player: Yokohama BayStars/Yokohama DeNA BayStars (1999–2014); Yomiuri Giants (2015); As coach: Yomiuri Giants (2016–present)

Career highlights and awards
- 3× NPB All-Star (2003, 2005, 2006); 2× Mitsui Golden Glove Award (2005, 2007); Central League batting champion (2000); NPB All-Star Game MVP (2005 Game 1); 2000 Central League Rookie of the Year
Medals
Representing Japan
Men's baseball
World Baseball Classic
Gold medal – first place	2006 San Diego	Team

Tatsuhiko Kinjoh (Japanese: 金城 龍彦, Korean: 김용언, Hanja: 金龍彦, born July 27, 1976) is a Japanese professional baseball coach and former player of Korean descent from Higashinari-ku, Osaka, Japan. He played center field for the Yomiuri Giants. He threw right-handed, and was a switch hitter.

== Biography ==
Kinjoh's father was also a professional baseball player, who played two seasons with the Kintetsu Buffaloes.

Kinjoh was drafted as a pitcher by the Yokohama BayStars in the fifth round of the 1998 amateur draft, and surprised fans by winning the Central League batting title in 2000. He ended the season with a .346 batting average, but was hitting well over .400 at the start of the season. He also won the Central League rookie of the year award, becoming the first player in Japanese baseball to receive both awards in the same season.

His many errors at third base led the team to convert him to the outfield in 2001, but he was unable to repeat his success from the previous year. He played a horrific season in 2002, ending the season with a .170 batting average in 111 games. He made a comeback in 2003, hitting 16 home runs with a .302 batting average, and got 191 hits in 2005 (only one hit away from the team record, set by Robert Rose) to mark a .324 batting average. His speed and strong arm also won him a Central League golden glove award the same year.

Kinjoh's success in 2005 led to his participation in the 2006 World Baseball Classic. He has also played in the all star game in 2003, 2005 and 2006.
