= Makoto Kosaka =

Japanese baseball player (born 1973)

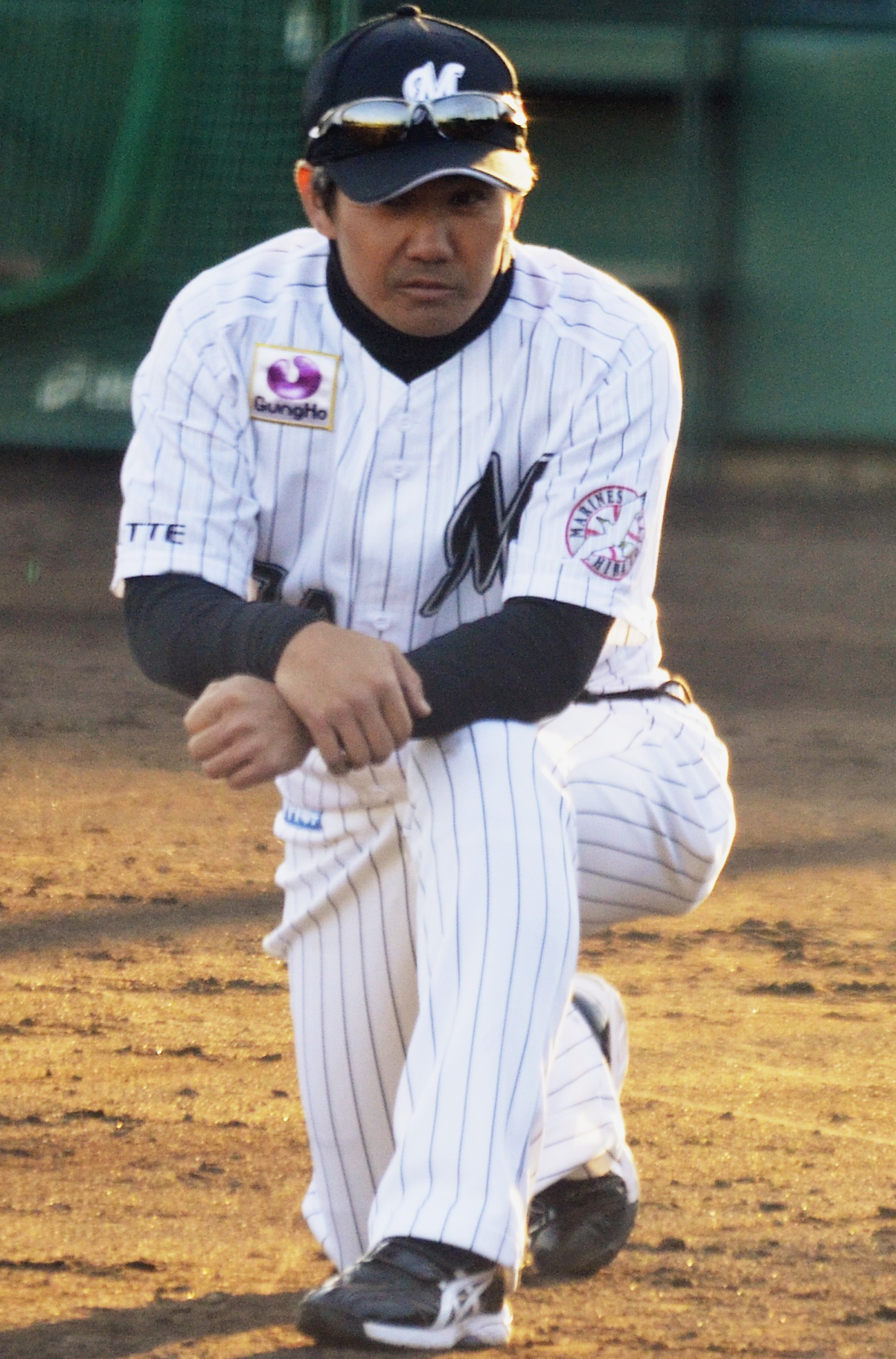
- Kosaka coaching for the Chiba Lotte Marines' farm team in 2018.
- Infielder / Coach
- Born: July 2, 1973 (age 52); Miyagi, Japan
- Batted: Left Threw: Right

NPB debut
- April 5, 1997, for the Chiba Lotte Marines

Last NPB appearance
- August 12, 2010, for the Tohoku Rakuten Golden Eagles

NPB statistics
- Batting average: .251
- Hits: 1,069
- RBIs: 303
- Stolen bases: 279
- Stats at Baseball Reference

Teams
- As player: Chiba Lotte Marines (1997–2005); Yomiuri Giants (2006–2008); Tohoku Rakuten Golden Eagles (2009–2010); As coach: Tohoku Rakuten Golden Eagles (2011–2013); Hokkaido Nippon-Ham Fighters (2014–2016); Yomiuri Giants (2017); Chiba Lotte Marines (2018–2023)

Career highlights and awards
- 1997 Pacific League Rookie of the Year; 2× Pacific League stolen base champion (1998, 2000); 4× Pacific League Golden Glove Award (1999-2001, 2005); 2× Japan Series champion (2005), (2008); 5× NPB All-Star (1997, 1999-2001, 2003)

Makoto Kosaka (小坂 誠, Kosaka Makoto; born July 2, 1973), nicknamed "Kosa", is a former Nippon Professional Baseball infielder and the current coach of the Chiba Lotte Marines.

Makoto Kosaka is well known for his fast running skills (50m in 5.6 seconds and 100m in 11.2 seconds.)

Shinya Miyamoto cited Kosaka as the greatest defensive shortstop in Nippon Professional Baseball (NPB) history.
