= Yoshiki Sunada =

Japanese baseball player

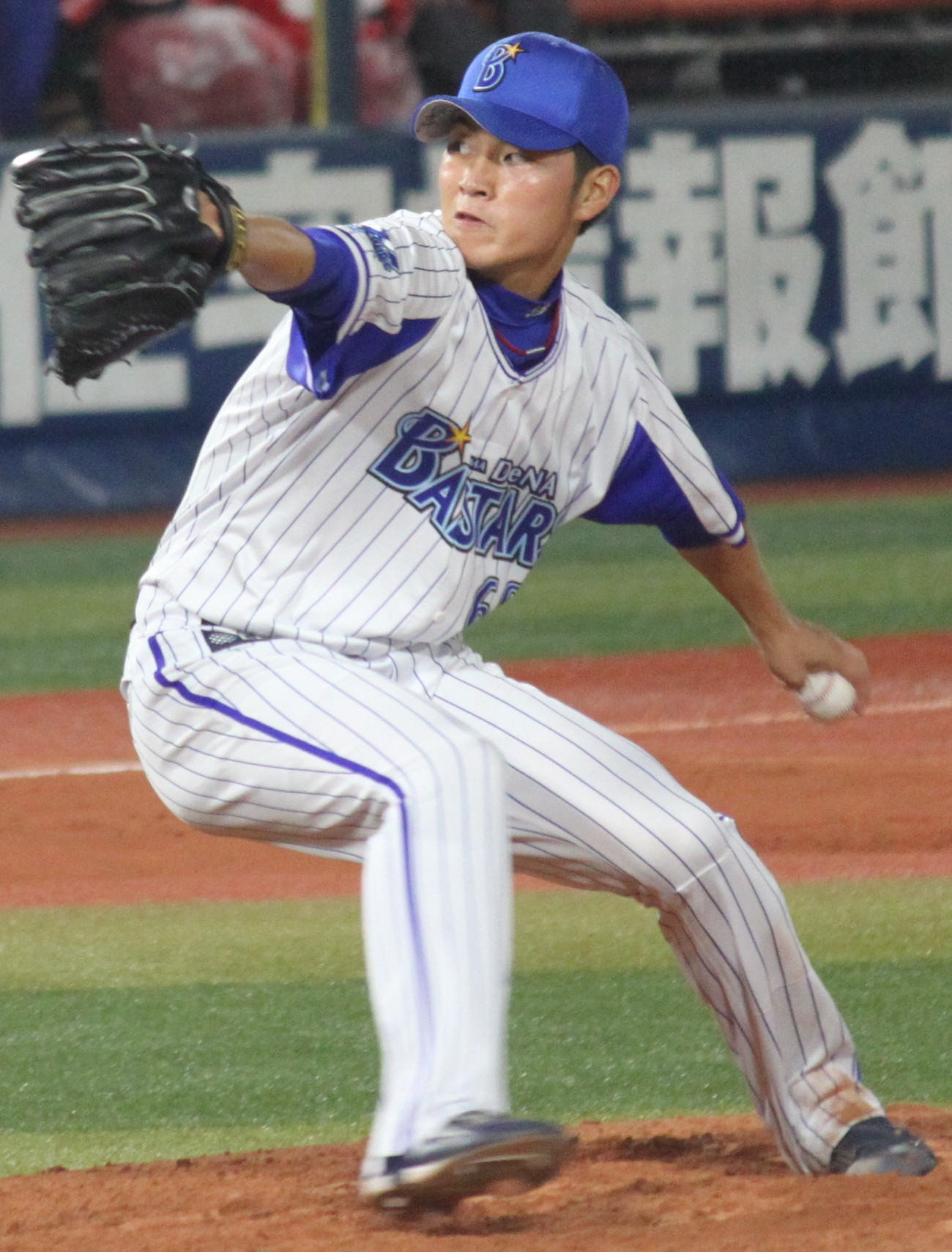
- Sunada with the Yokohama DeNA BayStars
- Pitcher
- Born: July 20, 1995 (age 30); Sapporo, Hokkaido, Japan
- Bats: Left Throws: Left

NPB debut
- June 14, 2015, for the Yokohama DeNA BayStars

Career statistics (through 2023 season)
- Win–loss record: 9–14
- Earned Run Average: 3.71
- Strikeouts: 255
- Stats at Baseball Reference

Teams
- Yokohama DeNA BayStars (2014–2022); Chunichi Dragons (2023–2024)

Yoshiki Sunada (砂田 毅樹, Sunada Yoshiki; born July 20, 1995 in Sapporo, Hokkaido, Japan) is a Japanese professional baseball pitcher for the Chunichi Dragons of Nippon Professional Baseball (NPB). He has previously played in NPB for the Yokohama DeNA BayStars.

== Career ==
=== Yokohama DeNA BayStars ===
Sunada spent the 2014 to 2022 seasons with the Yokohama DeNA BayStars.

=== Chunichi Dragons ===
On November 18, 2022, Sunada was traded to the Chunichi Dragons in exchange for Yōta Kyōda. Sunada made 18 appearances for Chunichi in 2023, compiling a 4.61 ERA with 12 strikeouts over 13 2/3 innings pitched.

On September 19, 2024, Sunada announced that he would be retiring following the conclusion of the season.
