= Eishin Soyogi =

Japanese baseball player (born 1980)

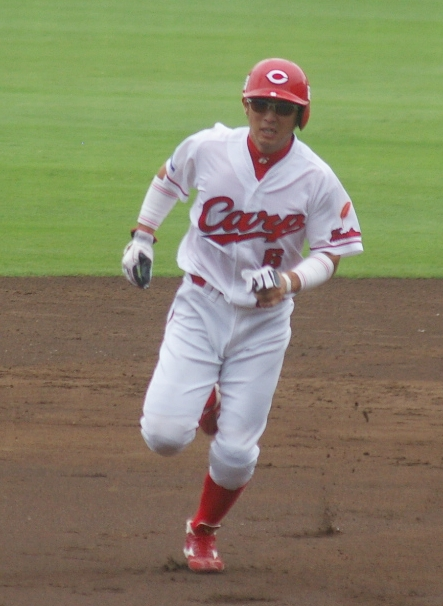
- Soyogi with the Hiroshima Toyo Carp

Hanshin Tigers – No. 77
- infielder / Coach
- Born: October 11, 1980 (age 46); Miyoshi, Hiroshima, Japan
- Batted: Right Threw: Right

NPB debut
- March 31, 2006, for the Hiroshima Toyo Carp

Last appearance
- September 8, 2016, for the Hiroshima Toyo Carp

NPB statistics (through 2017 season)
- Batting average: .264
- Hits: 990
- Home runs: 74
- RBI: 357
- Stolen bases: 135
- Stats at Baseball Reference

Teams
- As player: Hiroshima Toyo Carp (2006–2017); As coach: Orix Buffaloes (2021-2024); Hanshin Tigers (2025-present)

Career highlights and awards
- 2006 Central League Rookie of the Year; 1× Mitsui Golden Glove Award (2010); 1× Central League stolen base champion (2010)

Eishin Soyogi (梵 英心, Soyogi Eishin; born October 11, 1980) is a professional Japanese baseball player. He plays infielder for the Hiroshima Toyo Carp.
