= Nikita Moiseev =

Japanese baseball player (born 2006)

- Moiseev witht the Swallows in 2026

Tokyo Yakult Swallows – No. 31
- Outfielder
- Born: 29 November 2006 (age 19); Kariya, Aichi, Japan
- Bats: Left Throws: Left

NPB debut
- April 17, 2026, for the Tokyo Yakult Swallows
- Stats at Baseball Reference

Teams
- Tokyo Yakult Swallows (2026–present)

Nikita Moiseev (Note: Russian: Никита Моисеев; Japanese: モイセエフ ニキータ) (モイセエフ ニキータ, Moiseev Nikita; born November 29, 2006 in Kariya, Aichi, Japan) is a Japanese professional baseball outfielder for the Tokyo Yakult Swallows of Nippon Professional Baseball (NPB).

== Early life ==
Moiseev was born in Kariya, Aichi to Russian parents. Moiseev grew up playing baseball and practicing karate, but opted to focus on baseball from the fourth grade onwards. His father, Sergey, who had no previous knowledge of baseball, studied the sport by himself and helped train him.

== Amateur career ==
Moiseev attended Toyokawa High School in Toyokawa, Aichi. At the 2024 Japanese High School Baseball Invitational Tournament, Moiseev hit a home run off Haru Yoshioka, but Toyokawa was eliminated in the first round. That summer, Moiseev and Toyokawa were eliminated in the Aichi Prefectural tournament by mercy rule. Moiseev finished his high school career with 18 home runs.

== Professional career ==
Moiseev with the Swallows

Moiseev was selected in the second round of the 2024 Nippon Professional Baseball draft by the Tokyo Yakult Swallows. He was the only high school outfielder selected in the draft, signing for a ¥90 million bonus ($380,000) with an estimated annual salary of ¥6.5 million ($40,000).

Moiseev was selected to the NPB Fresh All-Star Game in 2025, but had to withdraw due to a stress fracture. On April 17, 2026, Moiseev made his NPB debut as a pinch hitter against the Yomiuri Giants, drawing a walk. Later that year, on July 27, he was selected again for the NPB Fresh All-Star Game.

== Personal life ==
Moiseev's father, Sergey, was a Tōkai region champion in Kyokushin. He has an older brother named Ilya.
