= Yu Hirosawa =

Japanese baseball player (born 2001)

Tokyo Yakult Swallows – No. 70
- Pitcher
- Born: April 27, 2001 (age 25); Setagaya, Tokyo, Japan
- Bats: Right Throws: Right

NPB debut
- March 31, 2026, for the Tokyo Yakult Swallows

NPB statistics (through August 8, 2026)
- Win–loss record: 3–2
- Earned run average: 3.11
- Strikeouts: 29
- Stats at Baseball Reference

Teams
- Tokyo Yakult Swallows (2026–present)

Yu Hirosawa (廣澤 優, Hirosawa Yu; born 27 April 2001) is a Japanese professional pitcher for the Tokyo Yakult Swallows of Nippon Professional Baseball (NPB).

== Career ==
=== Before turning pro ===
Hirosawa attended Third Junior & Senior High School of Nihon University, and later went on to play for JFE East, a team in the industrial leagues. He went on to play for the Ehime Mandarin Pirates of Shikoku Island League Plus.

=== Tokyo Yakult Swallows ===
On October 24, 2024, Hirosawa was selected by the Tokyo Yakult Swallows in the 2nd round of the 2024 Developmental Player draft.

In the 2025 season, Hirosawa pitched in 26 games for the minor league team, accumulating a 2–2 record, 1 save, and a 3.76 earned run average. He participated in the Asian Winter Baseball League in Taiwan, where he was utilized primarily as a closer.

On March 24, 2026, Hirosawa was registered as a first-team player, and signed his first professional contract. He made his professional debut on March 31, against the Hiroshima Toyo Carp, pitching a clean 9th inning with a strikeout. On September 6, Hirosawa was demoted to the second team after giving up three runs in one inning against the Chunichi Dragons the previous day.
