= Mishō Nishikawa =

Japanese baseball player (born 2003)

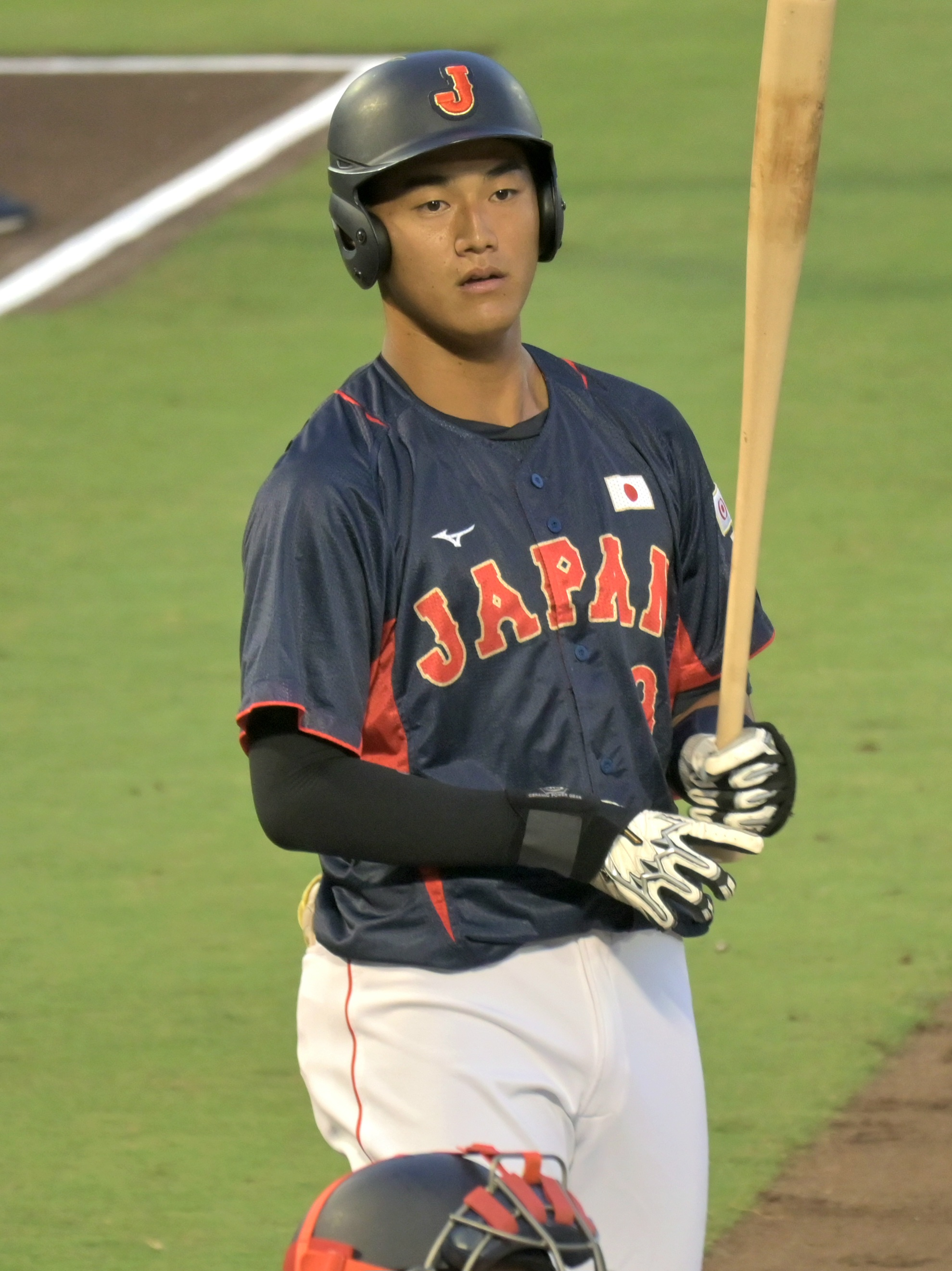

Chiba Lotte Marines – No. 6
- Outfielder
- Born: March 25, 2003 (age 23); Hidaka, Wakayama, Japan
- Bats: Right Throws: Right

NPB debut
- March 28, 2025, for the Chiba Lotte Marines

NPB statistics (through 2025 season)
- Batting average: .281
- Hits: 117
- Home runs: 3
- Runs batted in: 37
- Stolen base: 1
- Stats at Baseball Reference

Teams
- Chiba Lotte Marines (2025–present)

Career highlights and awards
- Pacific League Rookie of the Year (2025)

Mishō Nishikawa (西川 史礁, Nishikawa Mishō; born March 25, 2003) is a Japanese professional baseball outfielder for the Chiba Lotte Marines in Nippon Professional Baseball.
