= Kōta Shōji =

Japanese baseball player (born 2000)

Tokyo Yakult Swallows – No. 30
- Pitcher
- Born: May 22, 2000 (age 25); Hachiōji, Tokyo, Japan
- Bats: Left Throws: Left

NPB debut
- March 29, 2025, for the Tokyo Yakult Swallows

Career statistics (through 2025 season)
- Win–loss record: 2-1
- Earned Run Average: 1.05
- Strikeouts: 53
- Saves: 0
- Holds: 28
- Stats at Baseball Reference

Teams
- Tokyo Yakult Swallows (2025–present)

Career highlights and awards
- Central League Rookie of the Year (2025)

Kōta Shōji (荘司 宏太, Shōji Kōta; born May 22, 2000 in Hachiōji, Tokyo, Japan) is a professional Japanese baseball player. He plays pitcher for the Tokyo Yakult Swallows.

In 2025 he won the CL Nippon Professional Baseball Rookie of the Year Award.
