= Taiyō Satō =

Japanase baseball player (born 2002)

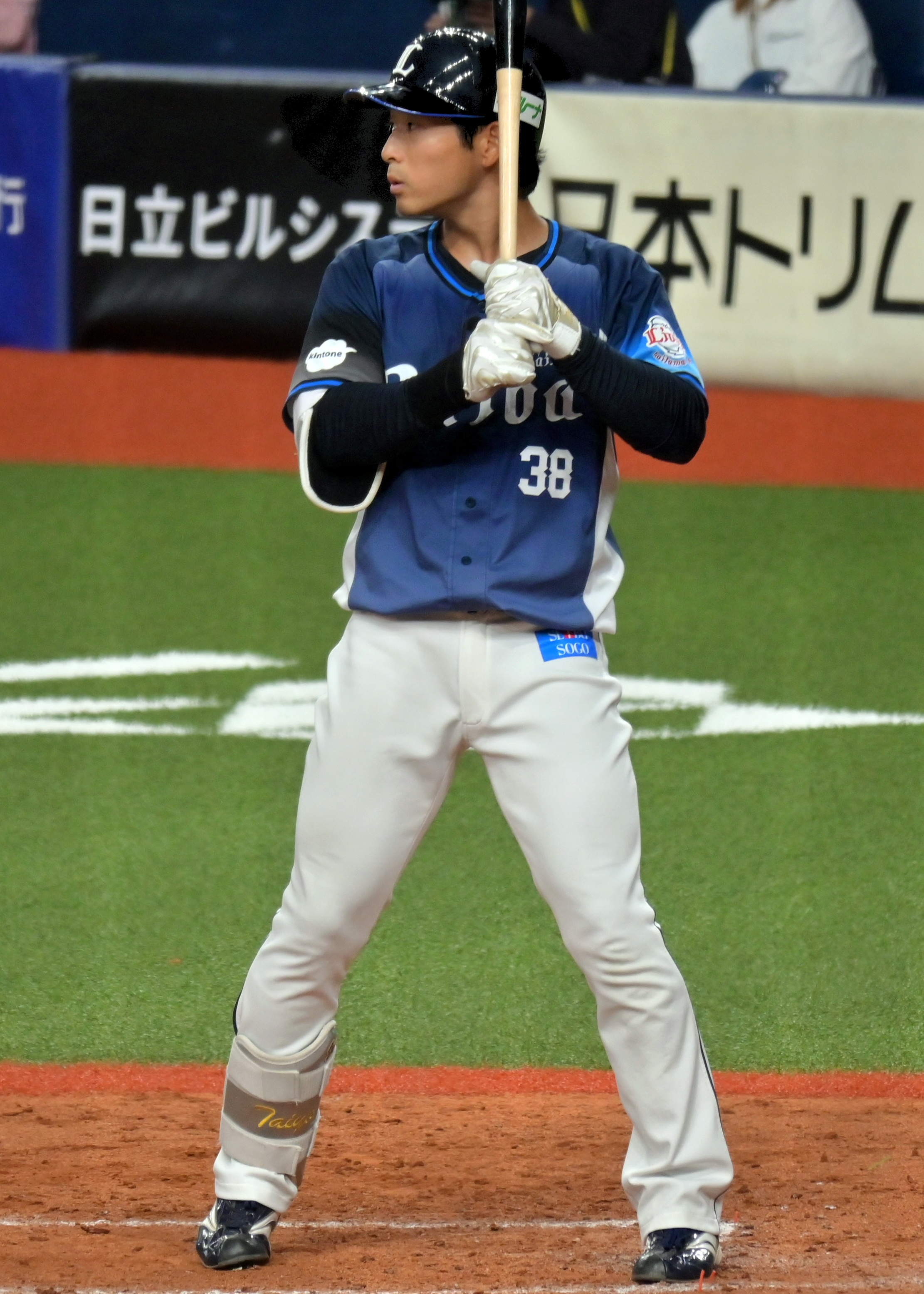
- Satō batting at the Kyocera Dome on April 16, 2026

Saitama Seibu Lions – No. 38
- Infielder
- Born: May 19, 2002 (age 24); Hamamatsu, Shizuoka, Japan
- Bats: Left Throws: Right

NPB debut
- July 26, 2025, for the Saitama Seibu Lions

NPB statistics (through June 22, 2026)
- Batting average: .175
- Home runs: 1
- Runs batted in: 4
- Stats at Baseball Reference

Teams
- Saitama Seibu Lions (2025–)

Taiyō Satō (佐藤 太陽, Satō Taiyō; born May 19, 2002) is a Japanese professional baseball infielder for the Saitama Seibu Lions of Nippon Professional Baseball (NPB).

== Career ==
=== Saitama Seibu Lions ===
On October 24, 2024, Satō was selected by the Saitama Seibu Lions with their second pick in the 2024 NPB Developmental Player draft.

On July 25, 2025, Satō signed a first-team contract with the Lions. On July 26, Satō was promoted to the first-team, one day after signing his first professional contract, and started as the ninth-hitter and second baseman against the Tohoku Rakuten Golden Eagles. Satō went 0-for-3 with a strikeout. On August 5, Satō recorded his first professional hit off Sachiya Yamasaki in a 6–1 loss against the Hokkaido Nippon-Ham Fighters. On August 15, Satō was demoted to the 2nd team in response to the promotion of Hiyu Motoyama. On September 27, Satō was promoted back to the first team, and recorded his first 3-hit-game on October 3 against the Eagles. Satō participated in the 2024 Asian Winter Baseball League in Taiwan.

On April 15, 2026, Satō hit his first career home run off Luis Perdomo of the Orix Buffaloes.
