= Yusei Ishizuka =

Japanese baseball player (born 2006)

Yomiuri Giants – No. 23
- Infielder
- Born: April 6, 2006 (age 20); Yachiyo, Chiba, Japan
- Bats: Right Throws: Right

NPB debut
- September 14, 2025, for the Yomiuri Giants

NPB statistics (through August 1, 2026)
- Batting average: .231
- Home runs: 0
- Runs batted in: 5

Teams
- Yomiuri Giants (2025–present)

Yusei Ishizuka (石塚 裕惺, Ishizuka Yusei; born April 6, 2006) is a professional Japanese baseball player. He plays infielder for the Yomiuri Giants.
