= Hibiki Shinohara =

Japanese baseball player (born 2006)

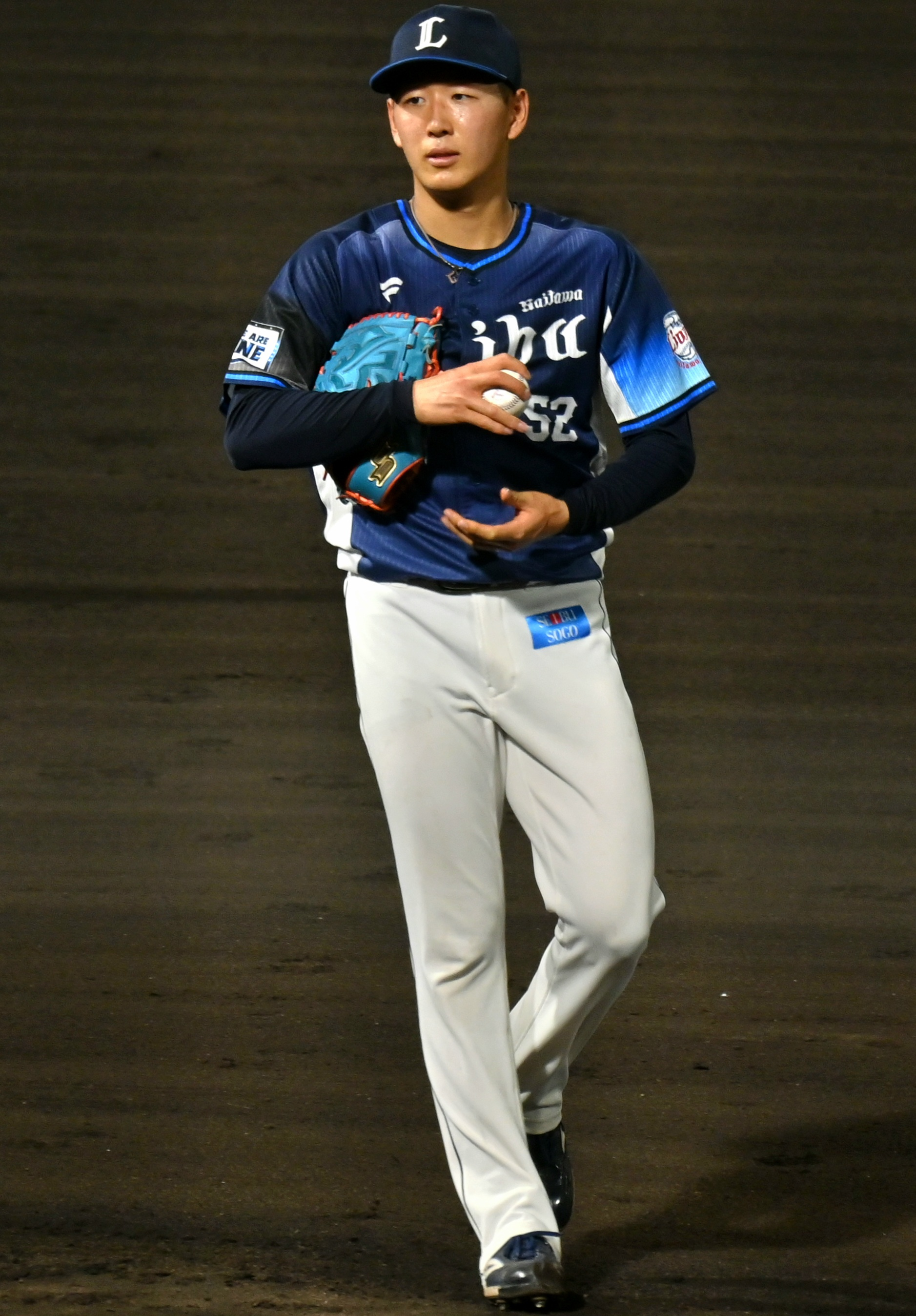

Saitama Seibu Lions – No. 52
- Pitcher
- Born: September 20, 2006 (age 19); Nagoya, Aichi, Japan
- Bats: Right Throws: Right

NPB debut
- September 7, 2025, for the Saitama Seibu Lions

Career statistics (through 2025 season)
- Win–loss record: 0-1
- Earned run average: 10.29
- Strikeouts: 8
- Saves: 0
- Holds: 0

Teams
- Saitama Seibu Lions (2025–present)

Hibiki Shinohara (篠原 響, Shinohara Hibiki; born September 20, 2006) is a Japanese professional baseball pitcher for the Saitama Seibu Lions of Nippon Professional Baseball (NPB).
