= Reo Shibata =

Japanese baseball player (born 2006)

Reo Shibata 柴田 獅子
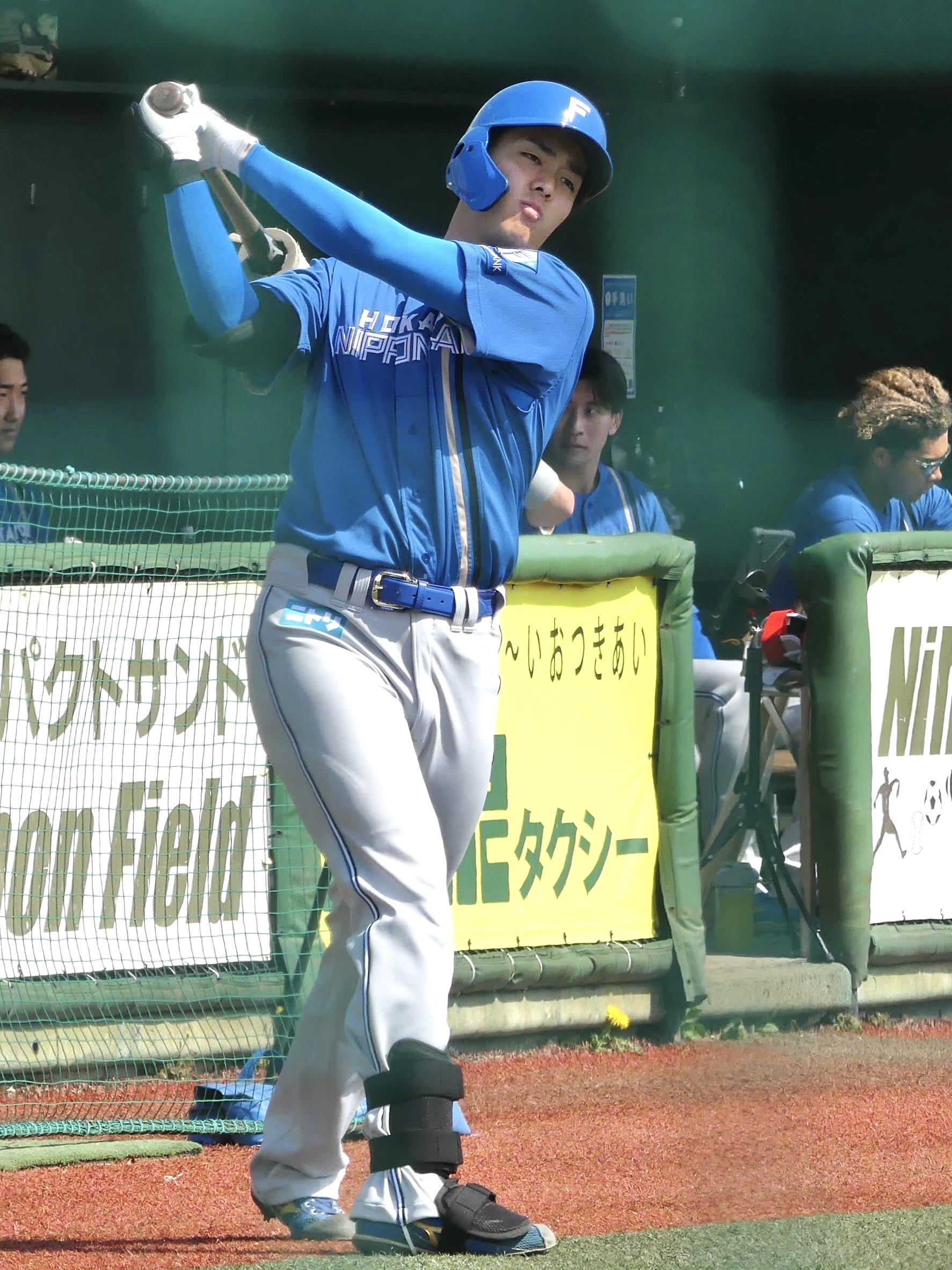

Hokkaido Nippon-Ham Fighters – No. 31
- Pitcher
- Born: April 18, 2006 (age 20); Iizuka, Fukuoka, Japan
- Bats: Left Throws: Right

NPB debut
- June 26, 2025, for the Hokkaido Nippon-Ham Fighters

Career statistics (through 2025 season)
- Win–loss record: 0-0
- Earned Run Average: 2.92
- Strikeouts: 27
- Saves: 0
- Holds: 1

Teams
- Hokkaido Nippon-Ham Fighters (2025–present)

Reo Shibata (柴田 獅子, Shibata Reo; born April 18, 2006 in Iizuka, Fukuoka, Japan) is a Japanese professional baseball pitcher for the Hokkaido Nippon-Ham Fighters of Nippon Professional Baseball (NPB).
