= Haruto Tanaka =

Japanese baseball player (born 2006)

Tokyo Yakult Swallows – No. 54
- Infielder
- Born: June 25, 2006 (age 20); Komae, Tokyo, Japan
- Bats: Left Throws: Right

NPB debut
- July 8, 2025, for the Tokyo Yakult Swallows

Career statistics (through 2025 season)
- Batting average: .308
- Hits: 4
- Home runs: 0
- RBI: 2
- Stats at Baseball Reference

Teams
- Tokyo Yakult Swallows (2025–present)

Haruto Tanaka (田中 陽翔, Tanaka Haruto; born June 25, 2006) is a Japanese professional baseball infielder for the Tokyo Yakult Swallows of Nippon Professional Baseball (NPB).
