= Takehiko Kobayakawa =

Japanese baseball player (born 1961)

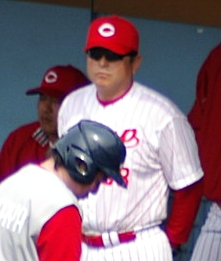
- Infielder
- Born: November 15, 1961 (age 64)
- Batted: Left Threw: Right

NPB debut
- April 7, 1984, for the Hiroshima Toyo Carp

Last appearance
- June 2, 1999, for the Yakult Swallows
- Stats at Baseball Reference

Teams
- As player: Hiroshima Toyo Carp (1984–1996); Yakult Swallows (1997–1999); As coach: Hiroshima Toyo Carp (2006–2009)

Career highlights and awards
- 1984 Central League Rookie of the Year

Takehiko Kobayakawa (小早川 毅彦, Kobayakawa Takehiko), (born November 15, 1961) is a former Japanese baseball player of the Hiroshima Toyo Carp and Yakult Swallows of Japan's Central League.

He was born in Aki-ku, Hiroshima, Hiroshima Prefecture.

He led his team into two Japan Series and winning one title (1984:Hiroshima and 1997:Yakult).

== Career ==
- 1st play on April 7, 1984.
- 1st hit on April 20, 1984.
- 1st home run on May 6, 1984.
- Rookie of the Year Award winner (1984).
- Greatest number of RBI (1987).
- MVP for the Month (June, 1987).
- 171 HR, 626 RBI, 3997 H, 34 SB.
- Hiroshima Carp Batting Coach (2006-).

Year	Team	No.	GP	AB	R	H	2H	3H	HR	RBI	TB	BB	SB	CS	SH	K	BA	Titles
1984	Hiroshima	6	112	357	50	105	17	1	16	59	172	27	8	1	4	66	.280	Rookie of the Year, League Champion, Japan Series Champion
1985	Hiroshima	6	98	269	41	78	16	3	14	45	142	34	4	3	3	66	.290	
1986	Hiroshima	6	73	173	21	45	5	0	12	24	86	15	1	0	0	33	.260	League Champion
1987	Hiroshima	6	124	420	57	120	17	1	24	93	211	37	5	4	0	96	.286	Greatest number of RBI
1988	Hiroshima	6	126	453	63	131	24	2	17	69	210	72	8	3	0	74	.289	
1989	Hiroshima	6	114	396	48	119	13	1	12	61	170	56	1	2	1	68	.301	
1990	Hiroshima	6	105	353	49	100	12	1	17	61	165	45	2	3	0	71	.283	
1991	Hiroshima	6	92	239	24	62	14	0	7	39	97	25	0	1	1	38	.259	League Champion
1992	Hiroshima	6	113	330	36	92	18	1	11	55	145	53	0	1	0	75	.279	
1993	Hiroshima	6	106	309	36	83	11	1	17	45	147	43	1	1	1	74	.269	
1994	Hiroshima	6	93	150	13	37	4	0	6	18	59	18	2	0	0	29	.247	
1995	Hiroshima	6	66	113	8	27	6	0	2	14	39	19	2	1	0	28	.239	
1996	Hiroshima	6	8	8	0	1	0	0	0	0	1	0	0	0	0	3	.125	
1997	Yakult	7	116	309	37	77	13	0	12	33	126	45	0	2	0	72	.249	League Champion, Japan Series Champion
1998	Yakult	7	62	81	6	14	4	0	3	8	27	12	0	1	0	12	.173	
1999	Yakult	7	23	19	1	2	0	0	1	2	5	1	1	0	0	5	.105	
TOTALS		-	1431	3997	490	1093	174	11	171	626	1802	502	34	23	10	810	.273	-
