= Shunsuke Urata =

Japanese baseball player (born 2002)

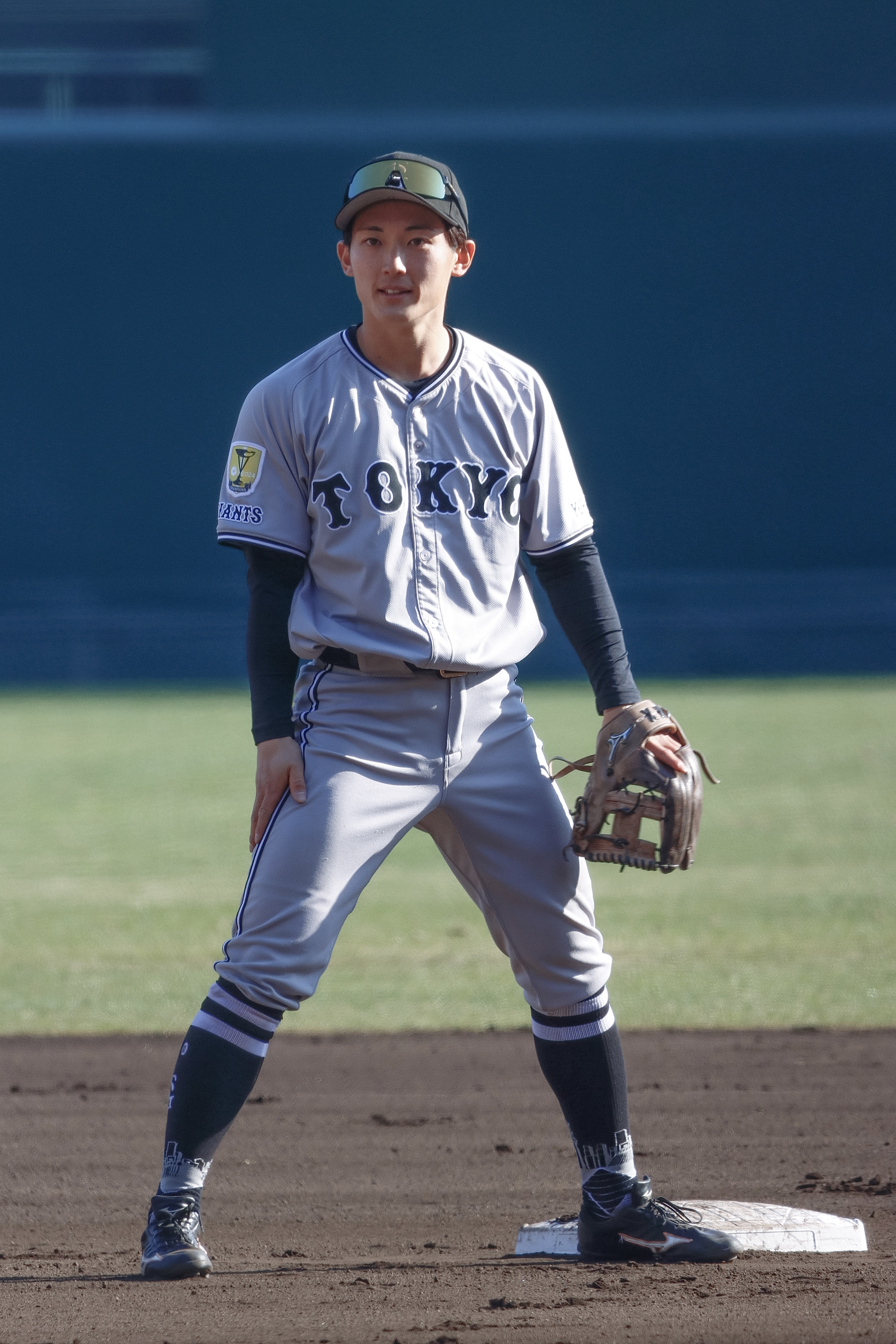
- Urata with the Yomiuri Giants

Yomiuri Giants – No. 32
- Infielder
- Born: August 30, 2002 (age 23); Nishisonogi, Nagasaki, Japan
- Bats: Left Throws: Right

NPB debut
- March 28, 2025, for the Yomiuri Giants

NPB statistics (through August 1, 2026)
- Batting average: .268
- Home runs: 0
- RBI: 21

Teams
- Yomiuri Giants (2025–present)

Career highlights and awards
- 1× NPB All-Star (2026)

Shunsuke Urata (浦田 俊輔, Urata Shunsuke; born August 30, 2002) is a professional Japanese baseball player. He plays infielder for the Yomiuri Giants.
