= Seiya Yoshida =

Japanese baseball player (born 2002)

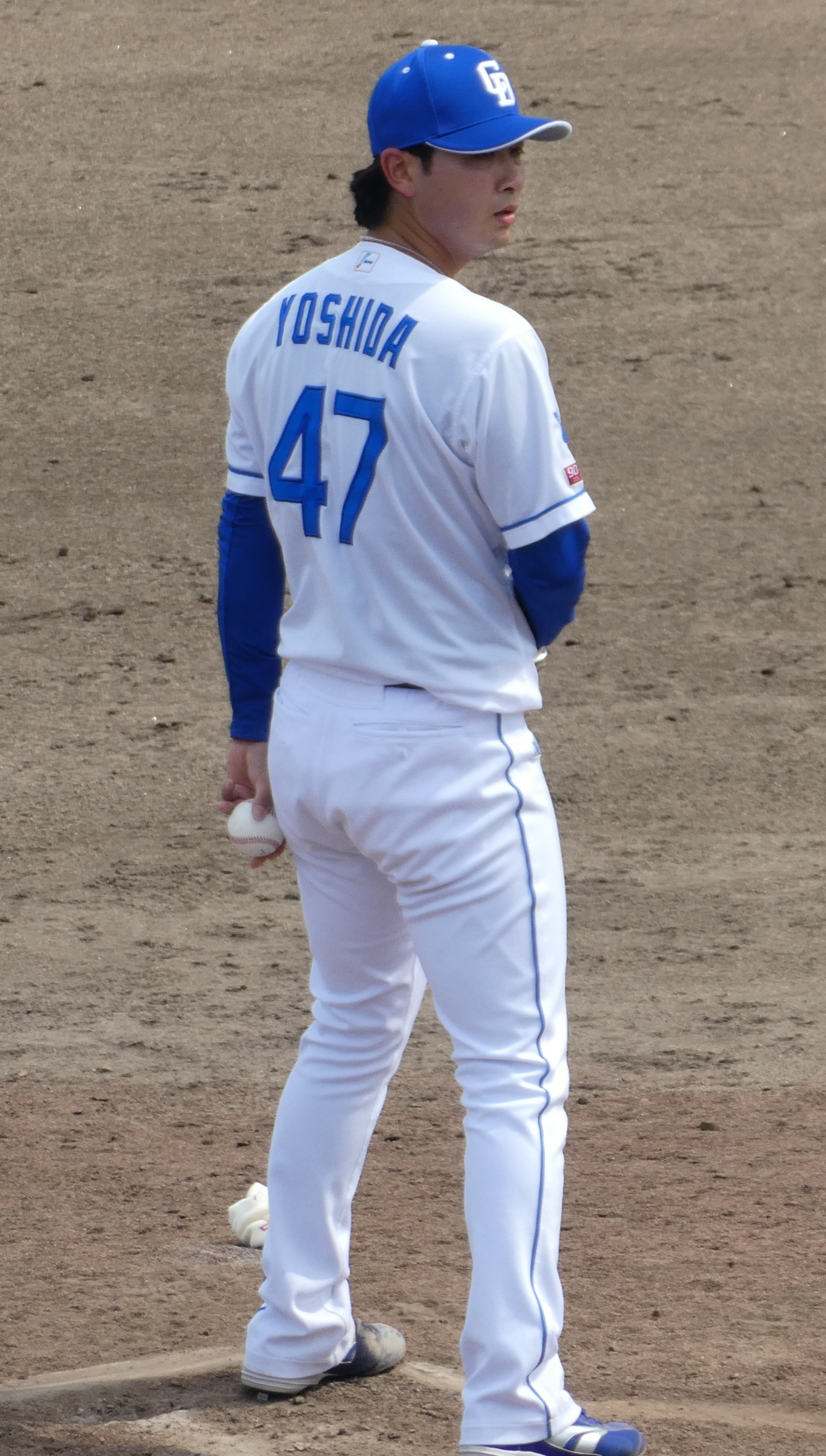
- Yoshida in 2025

Chunichi Dragons – No. 47
- Pitcher
- Born: May 23, 2002 (age 24); Karatsu, Saga, Japan
- Bats: Left Throws: Left

debut
- August 12, 2025, for the Chunichi Dragons

Career statistics (through July 30, 2026)
- Win-Loss: 1–2
- ERA: 2.33
- Strikeouts: 36
- Stats at Baseball Reference

Teams
- Chunichi Dragons (2025–Present)

Seiya Yoshida (吉田 聖弥, Yoshida Seiya; born May 23, 2002 in Karatsu, Saga, Japan) is a professional Japanese baseball player. He pitches for the Chunichi Dragons.
