= Seiya Watanabe =

Japanese baseball player (born 2002)

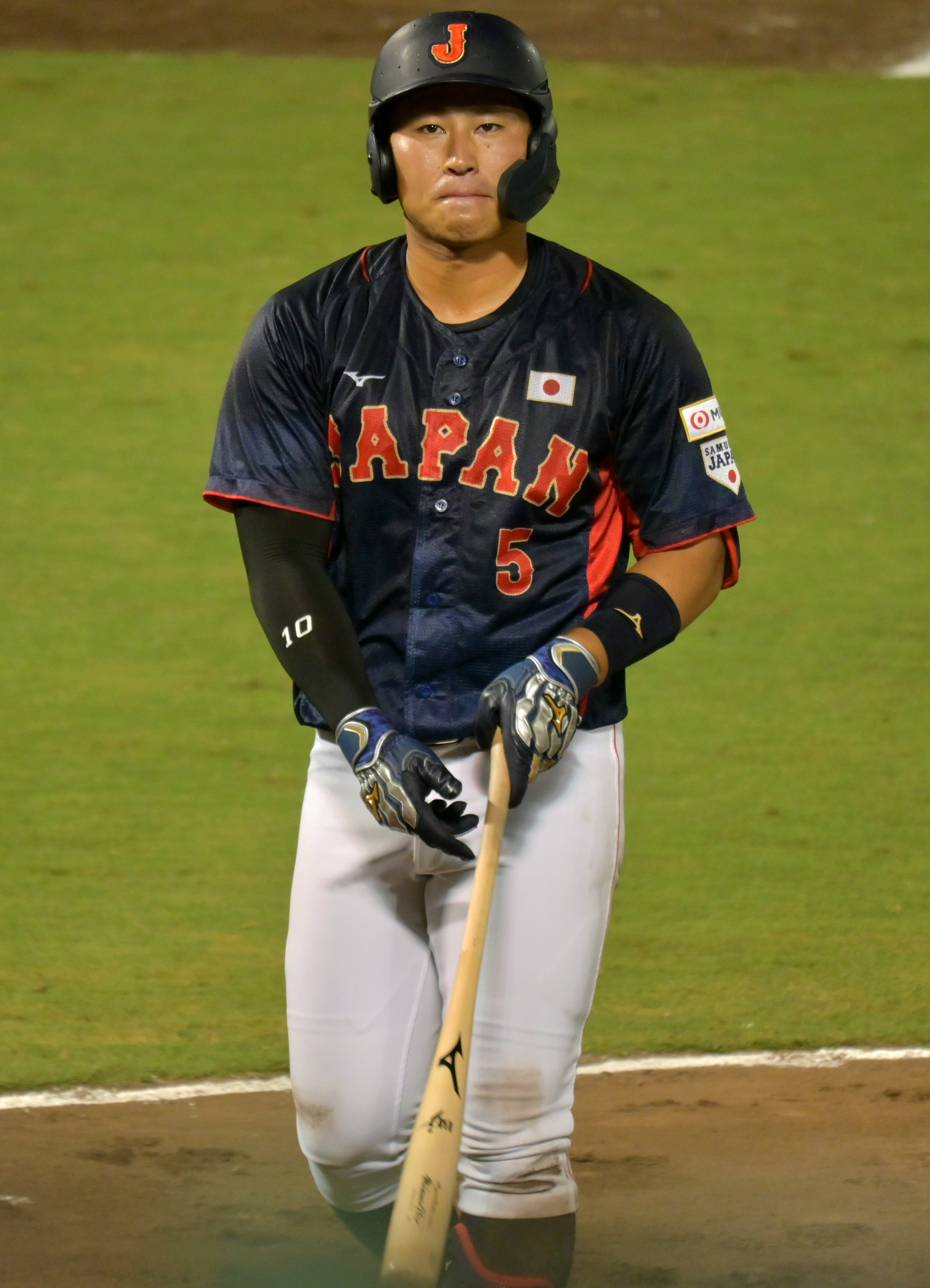

Saitama Seibu Lions – No. 8
- Outfielder
- Born: August 31, 2002 (age 23); Fuchū, Hiroshima, Japan
- Bats: Right Throws: Right

NPB debut
- March 28, 2025, for the Saitama Seibu Lions

NPB statistics (through 2025 season)
- Batting average: .259
- Home runs: 12
- Runs batted in: 43

Teams
- Saitama Seibu Lions (2025–present)

Career highlights and awards
- NPB All-Star (2025)

Seiya Watanabe (渡部 聖弥, Watanabe Seiya; born August 31, 2002) is a Japanese professional baseball outfielder for the Saitama Seibu Lions of Nippon Professional Baseball (NPB).
