= Kyushu Tokai University =

Coordinates: 32°48′42.3″N 130°44′39″E

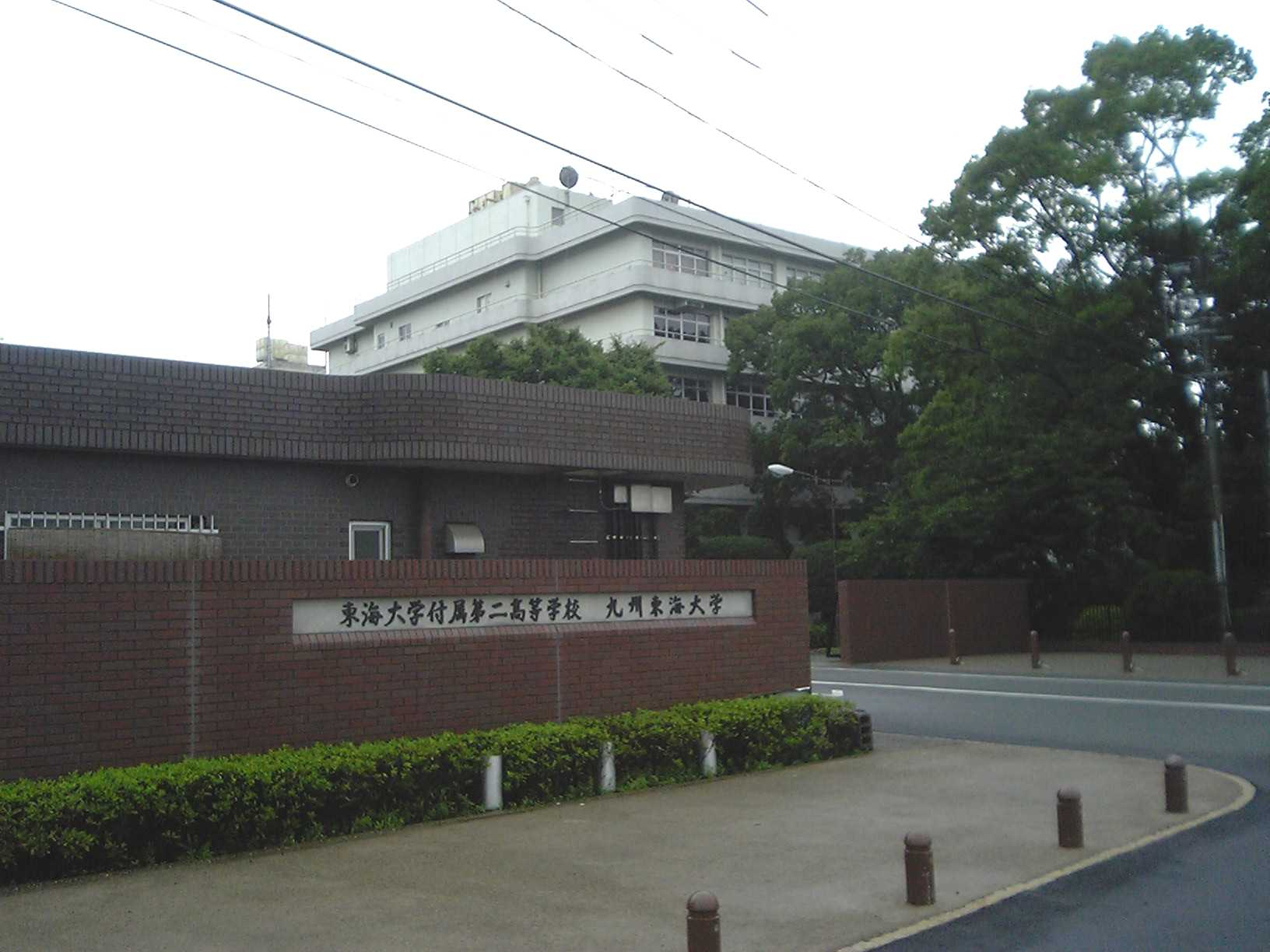
Kyushu Tokai University

Kyushu Tokai University (九州東海大学, Kyūshū tōkai daigaku) was a private university in Kumamoto, Kumamoto, Japan. The school was established in 1964 as a junior college and became a four-year college (School of Engineering) in 1973. The university opened a School of Agriculture on its Aso campus (Aso-gun, Kumamoto) in 1980. The university merged into Tokai University in 2008 and both campuses remained as Tokai University Kyushu Campuses (Kumamoto Campus and Aso Campus).

== Teachers ==
Teruaki Georges Sumioka, Associate Professor of Management
