= Teruyoshi Kuji =

Japanese baseball player and coach (born 1969)

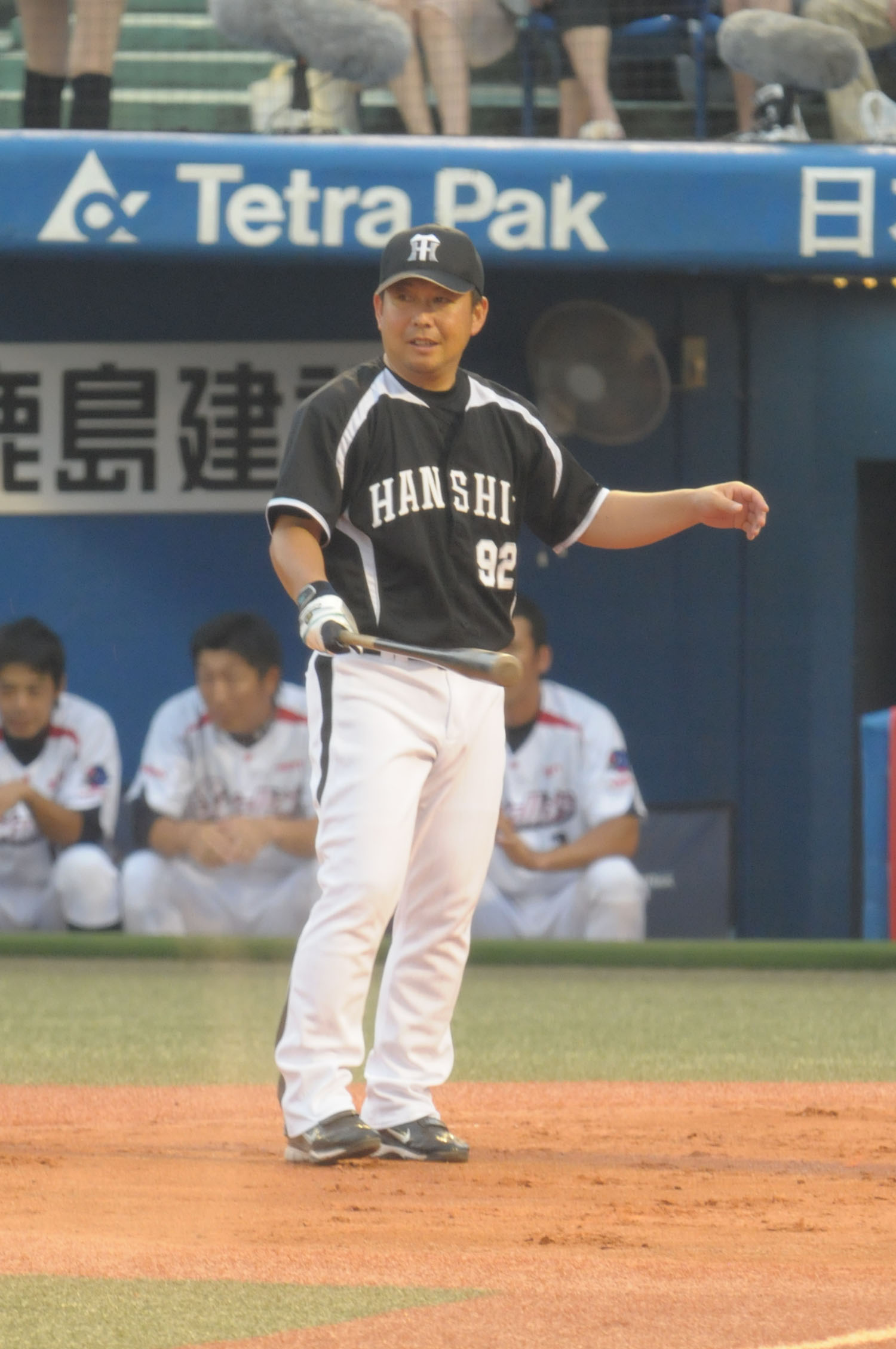
- Infielder / Coach
- Born: April 19, 1969 (age 56); Kōfu, Yamanashi, Japan
- Batted: Left Threw: Right

NPB debut
- April 4, 1992, for the Hanshin Tigers

Last NPB appearance
- October 26, 2005, for the Hanshin Tigers

NPB statistics
- Batting average: .257
- Home runs: 6
- Hits: 811

Teams
- As player: Hanshin Tigers (1992–1997, 2003–2005); Chunichi Dragons (1998–2002); As coach: Hanshin Tigers (2009–2013, 2016–2022)

Career highlights and awards
- 4× NPB All-Star (1992, 1995, 1996, 1997); 1992 Central League Rookie of the Year
- Last updated on: 8 February 2023

Teruyoshi Kuji (久慈 照嘉, Kuji Teruyoshi; born April 19, 1969 in Kōfu, Yamanashi, Japan) is a former Nippon Professional Baseball infielder.
