= Yumeto Kanemaru =

Japanese baseball player (born 2003)

Yumeto Kanemaru 金丸 夢斗
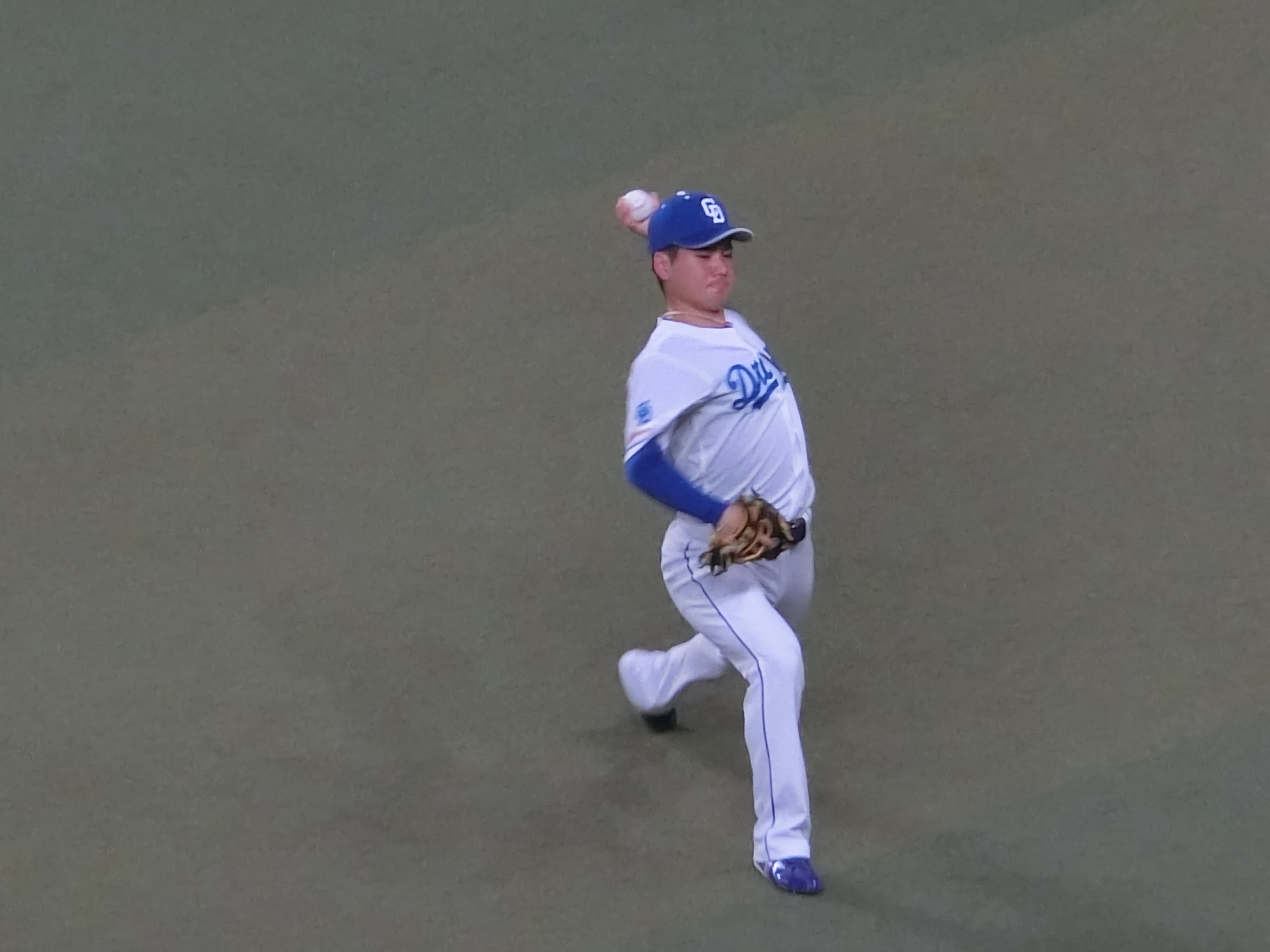

Chunichi Dragons – No. 21
- Starting pitcher
- Born: February 1, 2003 (age 23); Kobe, Hyōgo, Japan
- Bats: Left Throws: Left

NPB debut
- May 5, 2025, for the Chunichi Dragons

NPB statistics (through July 26, 2026)
- Win–loss record: 7–14
- Earned run average: 2.63
- Strikeouts: 176

Teams
- Chunichi Dragons (2025–present)

Yumeto Kanemaru (金丸 夢斗, Kanemaru Yumeto; born February 1, 2003) is a Japanese professional baseball pitcher for the Chunichi Dragons of Nippon Professional Baseball (NPB).
