= List of Orix Buffaloes seasons =

The Orix Buffaloes are a Nippon Professional Baseball team based in the Pacific League that splits their home games between Kyocera Dome Osaka in Osaka, Osaka Prefecture, Japan. and Kobe Sports Park Baseball Stadium in Kobe, Japan. The team originally began play as the Hankyu Club in 1936 in the Japanese Baseball League. They rebranded as the Hankyu Braves in 1947, which they retained all the way until 1989, when the team was acquired by Orix, a financial services company founded in Osaka; they became Orix Braves in 1989. In 1991, the team was rebranded as the Orix BlueWave. In 2004, mounting financial trouble led to the 2004 Nippon Professional Baseball realignment that saw the team merge with the Osaka Kintetsu Buffaloes of Osaka and rebrand as the Orix Buffaloes starting in 2005.

In 89 combined seasons as the Braves/BlueWave/Buffaloes, the team has won the Japan Series five times (1975, 1976, 1977, 1996, 2022) while finishing first place in the Pacific League 15 times, most recently doing so in 2023. In the playoff era of the Pacific League (1973–1982, 2004-present), the Buffaloes have reached the postseason 11 times (1973, 1974, 1975, 1977, 1979, 2008, 2014, 2021, 2022, 2023, 2025).

== Table key ==
Key to symbols and terms in season table
W	Number of regular season wins
L	Number of regular season losses
T	Number of regular season ties
GB	Games behind from league's first-place team^{[a]}
ROY	Rookie of the Year
MVP	Most Valuable Player
ESA	Eiji Sawamura Award^{[b]}
MSA	Matsutaro Shoriki Award

== Season-by-season records ==
Japan Series Champions (1950–present) †	Japanese Baseball League / Pacific League Pennant (1936–present)	Playoff / Climax Series Berth (1973–1982, 2004–present) ^

Season	League	Finish	Wins	Losses	Ties	Win%	GB	Playoffs	Awards
Hankyu Club
1936	JBL	^{[A]}	11	7	0	.611	—	—	
Autumn 1936	JBL	^{[A]}	17	12	1	.586	—	^{[B]}	
Spring 1937	JBL	4th	28	26	2	.519	13	^{[B]}	
Autumn 1937	JBL	7th	17	29	3	.370	21		
Spring 1938	JBL	3rd	21	13	1	.618	7.5		
Autumn 1938	JBL	3rd	21	17	2	.553	8.5	^{[B]}	
1939	JBL	3rd	58	36	2	.617	9	^{[B]}	
1940	JBL	3rd	61	38	5	.616	12.5	^{[B]}	
1941	JBL	2nd	53	31	1	.631	9	^{[B]}	
1942	JBL	4th	49	50	6	.495	23.5	^{[B]}	
1943	JBL	7th	31	51	2	.378	23.5	^{[B]}	
1944	JBL	3rd	19	15	1	.559	8.5		
1945	No league play because of World War II								
1946	JBL	3rd	51	52	2	.495	14		
Hankyu Braves
1947	JBL	4th	58	57	4	.504	20.5		
1948	JBL	4th	66	68	6	.493	20		
1949	JBL	2nd	69	64	3	.519	16	^{[B]}	
1950	Pacific	4th	54	64	2	.458	28.5		
1951	Pacific	5th	37	51	8	.420	31		
1952	Pacific	5th	49	58	1	.458	20.5		
1953	Pacific	2nd	67	52	1	.563	4		
1954	Pacific	5th	66	70	4	.485	23.5		
1955	Pacific	4th	80	60	2	.571	19		
1956	Pacific	3rd	88	64	2	.578	10.5		
1957	Pacific	4th	71	55	6	.561	11.5		
1958	Pacific	3rd	73	51	6	.585	4.5		
1959	Pacific	5th	48	82	4	.369	40		
1960	Pacific	4th	65	65	6	.500	17		
1961	Pacific	5th	53	84	3	.389	33.5		
1962	Pacific	4th	60	70	1	.462	18		
1963	Pacific	6th	57	92	1	.383	30.5		
1964	Pacific	2nd	79	65	6	.549	3.5		
1965	Pacific	4th	67	71	2	.486	21.5		
1966	Pacific	5th	57	73	4	.438	22		
1967	Pacific	1st	75	55	4	.577	—	Lost Japan Series (Giants) 4–2	Mitsuhiro Adachi (MVP)
1968	Pacific	1st	80	50	4	.615	—	Lost Japan Series (Giants) 4–2	Tetsuya Yoneda (MVP)
1969	Pacific	1st	76	50	4	.603	—	Lost Japan Series (Giants) 4–2	Tokuji Nagaike (MVP)
1970	Pacific	4th	64	64	2	.500	16.5		
1971	Pacific	1st	80	39	11	.672	—	Lost Japan Series (Giants) 4–1	Tokuji Nagaike (MVP)
1972	Pacific	1st	80	48	2	.625	—	Lost Japan Series (Giants) 4–1	Yutaka Fukumoto (MVP)
1973	Pacific	3rd/1st	77	48	5	.616		Lost Pacific League playoffs (Hawks) 3–2	
1974	Pacific	1st/3rd	69	51	10	.575		Lost Pacific League playoffs (Orions) 3–0	
1975	Pacific	1st/6th	64	59	7	.520		Won Pacific League playoffs (Buffaloes) 3–1; Won Japan Series (Carp) 4–0–2	Hideji Kato (MVP)
1976	Pacific	1st	79	45	6	.637	—	Won Japan Series (Giants) 4–3	Hisashi Yamada (MVP)
1977	Pacific	1st/2nd	69	51	10	.575		Won Pacific League playoffs (Orions) 3–2; Won Japan Series (Giants) 4–1	Hisashi Yamada (MVP)
1978	Pacific	1st	82	39	9	.678	—	Lost Japan Series (Swallows) 4–3	Hisashi Yamada (MVP)
1979	Pacific	2nd/1st	75	44	11	.630		Lost Pacific League playoffs (Buffaloes) 3–0	
1980	Pacific	4th/5th	58	67	5	.464			
1981	Pacific	3rd/2nd	68	58	4	.540			
1982	Pacific	2nd/5th	62	60	8	.508			
1983	Pacific	2nd	67	55	8	.549			
1984	Pacific	1st	75	45	10	.625	—	Lost Japan Series (Carp) 4–3	Greg Wells (MVP)
1985	Pacific	4th	64	61	5	.512	15.5		
1986	Pacific	3rd	63	57	10	.525	6.5		
1987	Pacific	2nd	64	56	10	.533	9		
1988	Pacific	4th	60	68	2	.469	15		
Orix Braves
1989	Pacific	2nd	72	55	3	.567	0^{[C]}		
1990	Pacific	2nd	69	57	4	.548	12		
Orix BlueWave
1991	Pacific	3rd	64	63	3	.504	18.5		
1992	Pacific	3rd	61	64	5	.488	18		
1993	Pacific	3rd	70	56	4	.556	3.5		
1994	Pacific	2nd	68	59	3	.535	7.5		Ichiro Suzuki (MVP)
1995	Pacific	1st	82	47	1	.636	—	Lost Japan Series (Swallows) 4–1	Ichiro Suzuki (MVP)
1996	Pacific	1st	74	50	6	.597	—	Won Japan Series (Giants) 4–1	Ichiro Suzuki (MVP)
1997	Pacific	2nd	71	61	3	.538	5		
1998	Pacific	3rd	66	66	3	.500	4.5		
1999	Pacific	3rd	68	65	2	.511	10.5		
2000	Pacific	4th	64	67	4	.489	8		
2001	Pacific	4th	70	66	4	.515	7		
2002	Pacific	6th	50	87	3	.365	39		
2003	Pacific	6th	48	88	4	.353	33.5		
2004	Pacific	6th	49	82	2	.374	29		
Orix Buffaloes
2005	Pacific	4th	62	70	4	.470	26		
2006	Pacific	5th	52	81	3	.391	28.5		
2007	Pacific	6th	62	77	5	.446	17		
2008	Pacific	2nd	75	68	1	.524	2.5	Lost Climax Series First Stage (Fighters) 2–0	
2009	Pacific	6th	56	86	2	.394	26		
2010	Pacific	5th	69	71	4	.493	7.5		
2011	Pacific	4th	69	68	7	.504	20.5		
2012	Pacific	6th	57	77	10	.425	17.5		
2013	Pacific	5th	66	73	5	.475	15		
2014	Pacific	2nd	80	62	2	.563	0^{[D]}	Lost Climax Series First Stage (Fighters) 2–1	Chihiro Kaneko (MVP)
2015	Pacific	5th	61	80	2	.433	30		
2016	Pacific	6th	57	83	3	.407	30		
2017	Pacific	4th	63	79	1	.444	30.5		
2018	Pacific	4th	65	73	5	.471	21.5		
2019	Pacific	6th	61	75	7	.449	16		
2020	Pacific	6th	45	68	7	.398	27		
2021	Pacific	1st	70	55	18	.560	—	Won Climax Series Final Stage (Marines) 3–1–0^{[e]} Lost Japan Series (Swallows) 4–2	Yoshinobu Yamamoto (MVP)
2022	Pacific	1st	76	65	2	.539	—	Won Climax Series Final Stage (Hawks) 4–1; Won Japan Series (Swallows) 4–2–1	Yoshinobu Yamamoto (MVP)
2023	Pacific	1st	86	53	4	.619	—	Won Climax Series Final Stage (Marines) 4–1; Lost Japan Series (Tigers) 4–3	Yoshinobu Yamamoto (MVP)
2024	Pacific	5th	63	77	3	.450	28		
2025	Pacific	3rd	74	66	3	.529	13.5	Lost Climax Series First Stage (Fighters) 2–0	
2026	Pacific	4th	65	76	2	.461	26.5		

== Notes ==
- ^{a} This is determined by calculating the difference in wins plus the difference in losses divided by two.
- ^{[b]} The award was not open to the Pacific League until 1989. The award was not given out in the following years: 1971, 1980, 1984, 2000, 2019, and 2024.

^{A} Records for the 1936 season are not complete.
^{B} For all but the first season of 1936, the JBL did not institute a playoff of any kind. The 1936, 1937, and 1938 seasons were the only seasons in its existence with first and second half champions.
^{C} Excluding ties, the Kintetsu Buffaloes finished 71–54 (.568) while the Orix Braves finished 72–55 (.567)
^{D} Excluding ties, the Fukuoka SoftBank Hawks finished 78–60 (.5652) while the Orix Buffaloes finished 80–62 (.5633)
^{e} Extra innings were not played in Climax Series games in 2021 because of pandemic restrictions. Game and series ended when tying run was scored since NPB rules state if a Climax Series round ends in a tie, the higher seed advanced as Lotte could do no better than tie the series.
