= List of Tokyo Yakult Swallows seasons =

The Tokyo Yakult Swallows are a professional baseball team based in Shinjuku, Tokyo, Japan. The team have played in the Central League of Nippon Professional Baseball since they were first formed in 1950 as the Kokutetsu Swallows. Formerly, they were known as the Kokutetsu Swallows, Sankei Swallows, Sankei Atoms, Yakult Atoms, and Yakult Swallows before they adopted their current moniker in 2006. The Swallows are named after their corporate owners, Yakult Honsha, who have owned the team since 1970. One of two teams to play in Tokyo, they have played their games at Meiji Jingu Stadium since 1964.

In 76 seasons, they have won the Japan Series six times (1978, 1993, 1995, 1997, 2001, 2021) while winning the league pennant nine times. In the Climax Series era for the league since 2007, they have reached the playoff seven times.

== Table key ==
Key to symbols and terms in season table
W	Number of regular season wins
L	Number of regular season losses
T	Number of regular season ties
GB	Games behind from league's first-place team^{[a]}
ROY	Central League Rookie of the Year Award
MVP	Central League Most Valuable Player Award
ESA	Eiji Sawamura Award
MSA	Matsutaro Shoriki Award
Series MVP	Japan Series Most Valuable Player Award

== Season-by-season records ==
Japan Series Champions (1950–present) †	Central League Pennant (1950–present)	Climax Series Berth (2007–present) ^

Season	League	Finish	Wins	Losses	Ties	Win%	GB	Playoffs	Awards
Kokutetsu / Sankei Swallows
1950	Central	7th	42	94	2	.309	57.5		
1951	Central	5th	46	59	2	.438	31.5		
1952	Central	5th	50	70	0	.417	33		
1953	Central	6th	45	79	1	.363	42		
1954	Central	5th	55	73	2	.430	32		
1955	Central	5th	57	71	2	.445	34.5		
1956	Central	4th	61	65	4	.485	21		
1957	Central	4th	58	68	4	.462	15.5		
1958	Central	4th	58	68	4	.462	17.5		
1959	Central	4th	63	65	2	.492	15.5		
1960	Central	6th	54	72	4	.431	16		
1961	Central	3rd	67	60	3	.527	5.5		
1962	Central	6th	51	79	4	.392	24		
1963	Central	4th	65	73	2	.471	18		
1964	Central	5th	61	74	5	.452	18.5		
1965	Central	6th	44	91	5	.326	45.5		
Sankei / Yakult Atoms
1966	Central	5th	52	78	5	.400	37		
1967	Central	5th	58	72	5	.446	26		
1968	Central	4th	64	66	4	.492	13		
1969	Central	5th	58	69	3	.457	16.5		
1970	Central	6th	33	92	5	.264	45.5		
1971	Central	6th	52	72	6	.419	19		
1972	Central	4th	60	67	3	.472	14.5		
1973	Central	4th	62	65	3	.488	4.5		
Yakult Swallows
1974	Central	3rd	60	63	7	.488	12		
1975	Central	4th	57	64	9	.471	16		
1976	Central	5th	52	68	10	.433	23.5		
1977	Central	2nd	62	58	10	.517	15		
1978	Central	1st	68	46	16	.596	–	Won Japan Series (Braves) 4–3	Tsutomu Wakamatsu (MVP); Katsuo Osugi (Series MVP)
1979	Central	6th	48	69	13	.410	19		
1980	Central	2nd	68	52	10	.567	6.5		
1981	Central	4th	56	58	16	.491	13.5		
1982	Central	6th	45	75	10	.375	23.5		
1983	Central	6th	53	69	8	.434	19		
1984	Central	5th	51	71	8	.418	25		
1985	Central	6th	46	74	10	.383	26.5		
1986	Central	6th	49	77	4	.389	27.5		
1987	Central	4th	58	64	8	.475	19.5		
1989	Central	5th	58	69	3	.457	22		
1989	Central	4th	55	72	3	.433	28.5		
1990	Central	5th	58	72	0	.446	30		
1991	Central	3rd	67	63	2	.515	7		
1992	Central	1st	69	61	1	.531	–	Lost Japan Series (Lions) 4–3	Jack Howell (MVP)
1993	Central	1st	80	50	2	.615	–	Won Japan Series (Lions) 4–3	Atsuya Furuta (MVP); Kenjiro Kawasaki (Series MVP)
1994	Central	4th	62	68	0	.477	8		
1995	Central	1st	82	48	0	.631	–	Won Japan Series (BlueWave) 4–1	Tom O'Malley (MVP); Tom O'Malley (Series MVP)
1996	Central	4th	61	69	0	.469	16		
1997	Central	1st	83	52	2	.615	–	Won Japan Series (Lions) 4–1	Atsuya Furuta (MVP); Atsuya Furuta (Series MVP)
1998	Central	4th	66	69	0	.489	13		
1999	Central	4th	66	69	0	.489	15		
2000	Central	4th	66	69	1	.489	12		
2001	Central	1st	76	58	6	.567	–	Won Japan Series (Buffaloes) 4–1	Roberto Petagine (MVP); Atsuya Furuta (Series MVP)
2002	Central	2nd	74	62	4	.544	11		
2003	Central	3rd	71	66	3	.518	15.5		
2004	Central	2nd	72	64	2	.529	7.5		
2005	Central	4th	71	73	2	.493	17.5		
Tokyo Yakult Swallows
2006	Central	3rd	70	73	3	.490	18		
2007	Central	6th	60	84	0	.417	20.5		
2008	Central	5th	66	74	4	.471	17.5		
2009	Central	3rd	71	72	1	.497	22	Lost Climax Series First Stage (Dragons) 2–1	
2010	Central	4th	72	68	4	.514	6.5		
2011	Central	2nd	70	59	15	.543	2.5	Won Climax Series First Stage (Giants) 2–1; Lost Climax Series Final Stage (Dragons) 4–2	
2012	Central	3rd	68	65	11	.511	20	Lost Climax Series First Stage (Dragons) 2–1	
2013	Central	6th	57	83	4	.407	28.5		Wladimir Balentien (MVP)
2014	Central	6th	60	81	3	.426	21		
2015	Central	1st	76	65	2	.539	–	Won Climax Series Final Stage (Giants) 4–1; Lost Japan Series (Hawks) 4–1	Tetsuto Yamada (MVP)
2016	Central	5th	64	78	1	.451	25.5		
2017	Central	6th	45	96	2	.319	44		
2018	Central	2nd	75	66	2	.532	7	Lost Climax Series First Stage (Giants) 2–0	
2019	Central	6th	59	82	2	.418	18		
2020	Central	6th	41	69	10	.373	25		
2021	Central	1st	73	52	18	.584	–	Won Climax Series Final Stage (Giants) 3–0; Won Japan Series (Buffaloes) 4–2	Munetaka Murakami (MVP); Yuhei Nakamura (Series MVP)
2022	Central	1st	80	59	4	.576	–	Won Climax Series Final Stage (Tigers) 4–0; Lost Japan Series (Buffaloes) 4–2–1	Munetaka Murakami (MVP)
2023	Central	5th	57	83	3	.407	29		
2024	Central	5th	62	77	4	.446	16.5		
2025	Central	6th	57	79	7	.419	26.5		
2026	Central	5th	61	80	2	.433	18		
