= List of Hiroshima Toyo Carp seasons =

The Hiroshima Toyo Carp are a professional baseball team based in Hiroshima, Japan. The team have played in the Central League of Nippon Professional Baseball since they were first formed in 1950 (after being founded in December 1949) as the Hiroshima Carp that has become in some circles a symbol of the "post-war reconstruction" of the city, which had been the target of the first atomic bombing. The team struggled in the first decade of play, with the first season over .500 not coming until 1960. In 1968, Toyo Kogyo became the chief sponsor of the team that saw their name inserted in the team name. The Matsuda family primarily owns the team, making the Carp the only NPB team to be privately owned.

In 76 seasons, they have won the Japan Series three times (1979, 1980, 1984) while winning the league pennant nine times. In the Climax Series era since 2007, they have reached the playoffs six times, recently doing so in 2023. They have the longest Japan Series championship drought as currently the only NPB team to not win the championship in the 21st century; the 41-year drought is the 4th longest in league history.

== Table key ==
Key to symbols and terms in season table
W	Number of regular season wins
L	Number of regular season losses
T	Number of regular season ties
GB	Games behind from league's first-place team^{[a]}
ROY	Central League Rookie of the Year Award
MVP	Central League Most Valuable Player Award
ESA	Eiji Sawamura Award
MSA	Matsutaro Shoriki Award
Series MVP	Japan Series Most Valuable Player Award

== Season-by-season records ==
Japan Series Champions (1950–present) †	Central League Pennant (1950–present)	Climax Series Berth (2007–present) ^

Season	League	Finish	Wins	Losses	Ties	Win%	GB	Playoffs	Awards
Hiroshima Carp
1950	Central	8th	41	96	1	.299	59		
1951	Central	7th	32	64	3	.333	41		
1952	Central	6th	37	80	3	.316	44.5		
1953	Central	4th	53	75	2	.414	36		
1954	Central	4th	56	69	5	.448	29.5		
1955	Central	4th	58	70	2	.453	33.5		
1956	Central	5th	45	82	3	.358	37.5		
1957	Central	5th	54	75	1	.419	21		
1958	Central	5th	54	68	8	.446	19.5		
1959	Central	5th	59	64	7	.481	17		
1960	Central	4th	62	61	7	.504	6.5		
1961	Central	5th	58	67	5	.465	13.5		
1962	Central	5th	56	74	4	.431	19		
1963	Central	6th	58	80	2	.420	25		
1964	Central	4th	64	73	3	.467	16.5		
1965	Central	5th	59	77	4	.434	31		
1966	Central	4th	57	73	6	.438	32		
1967	Central	6th	47	83	8	.362	37		
Hiroshima Toyo Carp
1968	Central	3rd	68	62	4	.523	9		
1969	Central	6th	56	70	4	.444	18		
1970	Central	4th	62	60	8	.508	15		
1971	Central	4th	63	61	6	.508	8		
1972	Central	6th	49	75	6	.395	24		
1973	Central	6th	60	67	3	.472	6.5		
1974	Central	6th	54	72	4	.429	19.5		
1975	Central	1st	72	47	11	.605	—	Lost Japan Series (Braves) 4–0–2	Koji Yamamoto (MVP)
1976	Central	3rd	61	58	11	.513	14		
1977	Central	5th	51	67	12	.432	25		
1978	Central	3rd	62	50	18	.554	5		
1979	Central	1st	67	50	13	.573	—	Won Japan Series (Buffaloes) 4–3	Yutaka Enatsu (MVP); Yoshihiko Takahashi (Series MVP)
1980	Central	1st	73	44	13	.624	—	Won Japan Series (Buffaloes) 4–3	Koji Yamamoto (MVP); Jim Lyttle (Series MVP)
1981	Central	2nd	67	54	9	.554	6		
1982	Central	4th	59	58	13	.504	8		
1983	Central	2nd	65	55	10	.542	6		
1984	Central	1st	75	45	10	.625	—	Won Japan Series (Braves) 4–3	Sachio Kinugasa (MVP); Kiyoyuki Nagashima (Series MVP)
1985	Central	2nd	68	57	5	.544	7		
1986	Central	1st	73	46	11	.613	—	Lost Japan Series (Lions) 4–3–1	Manabu Kitabeppu (MVP)
1987	Central	3rd	65	55	10	.542	11.5		
1989	Central	3rd	65	62	3	.512	15		
1989	Central	2nd	73	51	6	.589	9		
1990	Central	2nd	66	64	2	.508	22		
1991	Central	1st	74	56	2	.569	—	Lost Japan Series (Lions) 4–3	Shinji Sasaoka (MVP)
1992	Central	4th	66	64	0	.508	3		
1993	Central	6th	53	77	1	.408	27		
1994	Central	3rd	66	64	0	.508	4		
1995	Central	2nd	74	56	1	.569	8		
1996	Central	3rd	71	59	0	.546	6		
1997	Central	3rd	66	69	0	.489	17		
1998	Central	5th	60	75	0	.444	19		
1999	Central	5th	57	78	0	.422	24		
2000	Central	5th	65	70	1	.481	13		
2001	Central	4th	68	65	7	.511	?		
2002	Central	5th	64	72	4	.471	21		
2003	Central	5th	67	71	2	.486	20		
2004	Central	5th	60	77	1	.438	20		
2005	Central	6th	58	84	4	.408	29.5		
2006	Central	5th	62	79	5	.440	25		
2007	Central	5th	60	82	2	.423	19.5		
2008	Central	4th	69	70	5	.496	14		
2009	Central	5th	65	75	4	.464	26.5		
2010	Central	5th	58	84	2	.408	21.5		
2011	Central	5th	60	76	8	.441	16		
2012	Central	4th	61	71	12	.462	26.5		
2013	Central	3rd	69	72	3	.489	17	Won Climax Series First Stage (Tigers) 2–0; Lost Climax Series Final Stage (Giants) 4–0	
2014	Central	3rd	74	68	2	.521	7.5	Lost Climax Series (Tigers) 1–0–1	
2015	Central	4th	69	71	3	.493	6.5		
2016	Central	1st	89	52	2	.631	—	Won Climax Series Final Stage (BayStars) 4–1; Lost Japan Series (Fighters) 4–2	Takahiro Arai (MVP)
2017	Central	1st	88	51	4	.633	—	Lost Climax Series Final Stage (BayStars) 4–2	Yoshihiro Maru (MVP)
2018	Central	1st	82	59	2	.582	—	Won Climax Series FInal Stage (Giants) 4–0; Lost Japan Series (Hawks) 4–1–1	Yoshihiro Maru (MVP)
2019	Central	4th	70	70	3	.500	6.5		
2020	Central	5th	52	56	12	.481	13		
2021	Central	4th	63	68	12	.481	13		
2022	Central	5th	66	74	3	.471	14.5		
2023	Central	2nd	74	65	4	.532	11.5	Won Climax Series First Stage (BayStars) 2–0; Lost Climax Series Final Stage (Tigers) 4–0	
2024	Central	4th	68	70	5	.493	10		
2025	Central	5th	59	79	5	.428	25.5		
2026	Central	4th	61	78	4	.439	17		
