= List of Yokohama DeNA BayStars seasons =

The Yokohama DeNA BayStars are a professional baseball team based in Yokohama. The BayStars play in the Central League in Nippon Professional Baseball. Their home field is Yokohama Stadium, located in central Yokohama. The team has been known by several names since becoming a professional team in 1950, starting with the Taiyo Whales, Taiyo Shochiku Robins, Yosho Robins, Yokohama Taiyo Whales and Yokohama BayStars before obtaining their current moniker with the purchase of the team by software company DeNA in 2011.

In their 76 seasons of NPB play, the BayStars have won three Japan Series championships (1960, 1998, 2024), 9th most among all current NPB teams. They have finished first place in the Central League twice. In the Climax Series era since 2007, the BayStars have qualified for the playoffs seven times.

== Table key ==
Key to symbols and terms in season table
W	Number of regular season wins
L	Number of regular season losses
T	Number of regular season ties
GB	Games behind from league's first-place team^{[a]}
ROY	Rookie of the Year
MVP	Central League Most Valuable Player Award
ESA	Eiji Sawamura Award
MSA	Matsutaro Shoriki Award
Series MVP	Japan Series Most Valuable Player Award

== Season-by-season records ==
Japan Series Champions (1950–present) †	Central League Champions (1950–present)	Climax Series Berth (2007–present) ¤

Season	League	Finish	Wins	Losses	Ties	Win%	GB	Playoffs	Awards
Taiyo Whales
1950	CL	5th	69	68	3	.504	31		
1951	CL	6th	40	64	4	.385	37		
1952	CL	4th	58	62	0	.483	25		
Taiyo Shochiku / Yosho Robins
1953	CL	5th	52	77	1	.403	37.5		
1954	CL	6th	32	96	2	.250	55		
Taiyo Whales
1955	CL	6th	31	99	0	.238	61.5		
1956	CL	6th	43	87	0	.331	41		
1957	CL	6th	52	74	4	.415	21.5		
1958	CL	6th	51	73	6	.415	23.5		
1959	CL	6th	49	77	4	.392	28.5		
1960	CL	1st	70	56	4	.554	—	Won Japan Series (Orions) 4–0	Noboru Akiyama (MVP); Akihito Kondō (Series MVP)
1961	CL	6th	50	75	5	.404	21.5		
1962	CL	2nd	71	59	4	.546	4		
1963	CL	5th	59	79	2	.428	24		
1964	CL	2nd	80	58	2	.580	1		
1965	CL	4th	68	70	2	.493	23		
1966	CL	5th	52	78	0	.400	37		
1967	CL	4th	59	71	5	.454	25		
1968	CL	5th	59	71	3	.454	18		
1969	CL	3rd	61	61	8	.500	11		
1970	CL	3rd	69	57	4	.548	10		Masaji Hiramatsu (ESA)
1971	CL	3rd	61	59	10	.508	8		
1972	CL	5th	57	69	4	.452	17		
1973	CL	5th	60	64	6	.484	5		
1974	CL	5th	55	69	6	.444	17.5		
1975	CL	5th	51	69	10	.425	21.5		
1976	CL	6th	45	78	7	.366	32		
1977	CL	6th	51	68	11	.429	25.5		
Yokohama Taiyo Whales
1978	CL	4th	64	57	9	.529	7.5		
1979	CL	2nd	59	54	17	.522	6		
1980	CL	4th	59	62	9	.488	16		
1981	CL	6th	42	80	8	.344	31.5		
1982	CL	5th	53	65	12	.449	14.5		
1983	CL	3rd	61	61	8	.500	11		Kazuhiko Endo (ESA)
1984	CL	6th	46	77	7	.374	30.5		
1985	CL	4th	57	61	12	.483	14.5		
1986	CL	4th	56	69	5	.448	20		
1987	CL	5th	56	68	6	.452	22.5		
1988	CL	4th	59	67	4	.468	20.5		
1989	CL	6th	47	80	3	.370	36.5		
1990	CL	3rd	64	66	3	.492	24		
1991	CL	5th	64	66	1	.492	10		
1992	CL	5th	61	69	1	.469	8		
Yokohama BayStars
1993	CL	5th	57	73	0	.438	23		
1994	CL	6th	61	69	0	.469	9		
1995	CL	4th	66	64	0	.508	16		
1996	CL	5th	55	75	0	.423	22		
1997	CL	2nd	72	63	0	.533	11		
1998	CL	1st	79	56	1	.585	—	Won Japan Series (Lions) 4–2	Kazuhiro Sasaki (MVP); Takanori Suzuki (Series MVP); Kazuhiro Sasaki (MSA)
1999	CL	3rd	71	64	0	.526	10		
2000	CL	3rd	69	66	1	.512	9		
2001	CL	3rd	69	67	4	.507	8		
2002	CL	6th	49	86	5	.363	35.5		
2003	CL	6th	45	94	1	.325	42.5		
2004	CL	6th	59	76	3	.438	20		
2005	CL	3rd	69	70	7	.496	16.5		
2006	CL	6th	58	84	4	.408	29.5		
2007	CL	4th	71	72	1	.497	9		
2008	CL	6th	48	94	2	.340	36.5		
2009	CL	6th	51	93	0	.354	42.5		
2010	CL	6th	48	95	1	.337	32		
2011	CL	6th	47	86	11	.353	27.5		
Yokohama DeNA BayStars
2012	CL	6th	46	85	13	.351	41		
2013	CL	5th	64	79	1	.448	23		
2014	CL	5th	67	75	2	.472	14.5		
2015	CL	6th	62	80	1	.437	14.5		
2016	CL	3rd¤	69	71	3	.493	19.5	Won Climax Series First Stage (Giants) 2–1; Lost Climax Series Final Stage (Carp) 1–4	
2017	CL	3rd ¤	73	65	5	.529	14.5	Won Climax Series First Stage (Tigers) 2–1; Won Climax Series Final Stage (Carp) 2–4; Lost Japan Series (Hawks) 2–4	
2018	CL	4th	67	74	2	.475	14		
2019	CL	2nd ¤	71	69	3	.519	4.5	Lost Climax Series First Stage (Tigers) 1–2	
2020	CL	4th	56	58	6	.491	12		
2021	CL	6th	54	73	16	.425	20		
2022	CL	2nd ¤	73	68	2	.518	8	Lost Climax Series First Stage (Tigers) 1−2	
2023	CL	3rd ¤	74	66	3	.529	12	Lost Climax Series First Stage (Carp) 0−2	
2024	CL	3rd ¤	71	69	3	.507	8	Won Climax Series First Stage (Tigers) 2–0; Won Climax Series Second Stage (Giants) 3–4; Won Japan Series (Hawks) 4–2	Masayuki Kuwahara (Series MVP); Daisuke Miura (MSA)
2025	CL	2nd ¤	71	66	6	.518	13	Won Climax Series First Stage (Giants) 2–0; Lost Climax Series Final Stage (Tigers) 0–4	
2026	CL	3rd ¤	71	69	3	.507	7.5	Won Climax Series First Stage (Giants) 2–0; Won Climax Series Final Stage (Tigers) 4–1; Lost Japan Series (Hawks) 0–4	Shugo Maki (Climax Series MVP); Ryuki Watarai (JERA Award); Katsuki Azuma (Japan Series FSA)

== Notes ==
- ^{a} This is determined by calculating the difference in wins plus the difference in losses divided by two.
