= List of Hokkaido Nippon-Ham Fighters seasons =

The Hokkaido Nippon-Ham Fighters are a Nippon Professional Baseball team playing in the Pacific League. The team is based in Kitahiroshima, Hokkaido. The team began play in 1946 for the Japanese Baseball League as the Senators in Tokyo. They changed their named to the Tokyu Flyers the following year and did a handful of name changes over the years, most notably playing as the Toei Flyers (1954–1972). In 1973, the team was purchased by Nippon Ham and rebranded as the Nippon-Ham Fighters. In 2004, the team moved to Sapporo, Hokkaido and changed the name of the team to add Hokkaido to it. The team moved to Es Con Field Hokkaido in Kitahiroshima in 2023. In 80 seasons, the team has won the Japan Series three times (1962, 2006, 2016) while winning seven Pacific League pennants. They have appeared in the league playoffs 15 times.

== Table key ==
Key to symbols and terms in season table
W	Number of regular season wins
L	Number of regular season losses
T	Number of regular season ties
GB	Games behind from league's first-place team^{[a]}
ROY	Pacific League Rookie of the Year Award
MVP	Pacific League Most Valuable Player Award
ESA	Eiji Sawamura Award^{[b]}
MSA	Matsutaro Shoriki Award
Series MVP	Japan Series Most Valuable Player Award

== Season-by-season records ==
Japan Series Champions (1950–present) †	Pacific League Pennant (1950–present)	Playoff / Climax Series Berth (1973–1982, 2004–present) ^

Season	League	Finish	Wins	Losses	Ties	Win%	GB	Playoffs	Awards
Senators
1946	JBL	5th	47	58	0	.448	19		
Tokyu / Kyeui / Tokyu / Toei / Nittaku Home Flyers
1947	JBL	6th	51	65	3	.440	28		
1948	JBL	5th	59	70	11	.457	24.5		
1949	JBL	7th	64	73	1	.467	23		
1950	Pacific	6th	51	69	0	.425	32.5		
1951	Pacific	6th	38	56	8	.404	33		
1952	Pacific	6th	49	59	0	.454	21		
1953	Pacific	6th	50	67	3	.427	20		
1954	Pacific	7th	52	86	2	.377	38.5		
1955	Pacific	7th	51	89	3	.364	48		
1956	Pacific	6th	58	92	4	.390	39.5		
1957	Pacific	5th	56	73	3	.436	28		
1958	Pacific	5th	57	70	3	.450	22		
1959	Pacific	3rd	67	63	5	.515	21		
1960	Pacific	5th	52	78	2	.400	30		
1961	Pacific	2nd	83	52	5	.611	2.5		
1962	Pacific	1st	78	52	3	.600	—	Won Japan Series (Tigers) 4–2	Isao Harimoto (MVP); Masayuki Dobashi (Series MVP); Masayuki Tanemo (Series MVP)
1963	Pacific	3rd	76	71	3	.517	10.5		
1964	Pacific	3rd	78	68	4	.534	5.5		
1965	Pacific	2nd	76	61	3	.555	12		
1966	Pacific	3rd	70	60	6	.538	9		
1967	Pacific	3rd	65	65	4	.500	10		
1968	Pacific	6th	51	79	5	.392	29		
1969	Pacific	4th	57	70	3	.449	19.5		
1970	Pacific	5th	54	70	6	.435	24.5		
1971	Pacific	5th	44	74	12	.373	35.5		
1972	Pacific	4th	63	61	6	.508	15		
1973	Pacific	5th/3rd	55	69	6	.444			
Nippon-Ham Fighters
1974	Pacific	6th/6th	49	75	6	.395			
1975	Pacific	4th/4th	55	63	12	.466			
1976	Pacific	4th/5th	52	67	11	.437			
1977	Pacific	4th/4th	58	61	11	.487			
1978	Pacific	3rd/4th	55	63	12	.466			
1979	Pacific	3rd/4th	63	60	7	.512			
1980	Pacific	2nd/2nd	66	53	11	.555			Isamu Kida (MVP)
1981	Pacific	4th/1st	68	54	8	.557		Won Pacific League playoffs (Orions) 3–1–1; Lost Japan Series (Giants) 4–2	Yutaka Enatsu (MVP)
1982	Pacific	4th/1st	67	52	11	.563		Lost Pacific League playoffs (Lions) 3–1	
1983	Pacific	3rd	64	59	7	.520	20.5		
1984	Pacific	6th	44	73	13	.376	29.5		
1985	Pacific	5th	53	65	12	.449	23		
1986	Pacific	5th	57	65	8	.467	13.5		
1987	Pacific	3rd	63	60	7	.512	11.5		
1988	Pacific	3rd	62	65	3	.488	12.5		
1989	Pacific	5th	54	73	3	.425	18		
1990	Pacific	4th	66	63	1	.512	16.5		
1991	Pacific	4th	53	72	5	.424	28.5		
1992	Pacific	5th	54	73	3	.425	26		
1993	Pacific	2nd	71	52	7	.577	1		
1994	Pacific	6th	46	79	5	.368	28.5		
1995	Pacific	4th	59	68	3	.465	22		
1996	Pacific	2nd	68	58	4	.540	7		
1997	Pacific	4th	63	71	1	.470	14		
1998	Pacific	2nd	67	65	3	.508	3.5		
1999	Pacific	5th	60	73	2	.451	18.5		
2000	Pacific	3rd	69	65	1	.515	4.5		
2001	Pacific	6th	53	84	3	.387	24.5		
2002	Pacific	5th	61	76	3	.445	28		
2003	Pacific	5th	62	74	4	.456	19.5		
Hokkaido Nippon-Ham Fighters
2004	Pacific	3rd	66	65	2	.504	12	Lost Pacific League playoffs (Lions) 2–1	
2005	Pacific	5th	62	71	3	.466	26.5		
2006	Pacific	1st	82	54	0	.603	—	Won Pacific League playoffs (Hawks) 3–0; Won Japan Series (Dragons) 4–1	Michihiro Ogasawara (MVP); Atsunori Inaba (Series MVP)
2007	Pacific	1st	79	60	5	.568	—	Won Climax Series Final Stage (Marines) 3–2; Lost Japan Series (Dragons) 4–1	Yu Darvish (MVP)
2008	Pacific	3rd	73	69	2	.514	4	Won Climax Series First Stage (Buffaloes) 2–0; Lost Climax Series Final Stage (Lions) 4–2	
2009	Pacific	1st	82	60	2	.577	—	Won Climax Series Final Stage (Golden Eagles) 4–1; Lost Japan Series (Giants) 4–2	Yu Darvish (MVP)
2010	Pacific	4th	74	67	3	.525	3		
2011	Pacific	2nd	72	65	7	.526	17.5	Lost Climax Series First Stage (Lions) 2–0	
2012	Pacific	1st	74	59	11	.556	—	Won Climax Series Final Stage (Hawks) 4–0; Lost Japan Series (Giants) 4–2	Mitsuo Yoshikawa (MVP)
2013	Pacific	6th	64	78	2	.451	18.5		
2014	Pacific	3rd	73	68	3	.518	6.5	Won Climax Series First Stage (Buffaloes) 2–1; Lost Climax Series Final Stage (Hawks) 4–3	
2015	Pacific	2nd	79	62	2	.560	12	Lost Climax Series First Stage (Marines) 2–1	
2016	Pacific	1st	87	53	3	.621	–	Won Climax Series Final Stage (Hawks) 4–2; Won Japan Series (Carp) 4–2	Shohei Ohtani (MVP); Brandon Laird (Series MVP)
2017	Pacific	5th	60	83	0	.420	34		
2018	Pacific	3rd	74	66	3	.529	13.5	Lost Climax Series First Stage (Hawks) 2–1	
2019	Pacific	5th	65	73	5	.471	13		
2020	Pacific	5th	53	62	5	.461	20		
2021	Pacific	5th	55	68	20	.447	14		
2022	Pacific	6th	59	81	3	.421	16.5		
2023	Pacific	6th	60	82	1	.423	27.5		
2024	Pacific	2nd	75	60	8	.556	13.5	Won Climax Series First Stage (Marines) 2–1; Lost Climax Series Final Stage (Hawks) 4–0	
2025	Pacific	2nd	83	57	3	.593	4.5	Won Climax Series First Stage (Buffaloes) 2–0; Lost Climax Series Final Stage (Hawks) 4–3	
2026	Pacific	3rd	78	62	3	.557	13.0	Won Climax Series First Stage (Lions) 2–1; Lost Climax Series Final Stage (Hawks) 5-0	

== Notes ==
^{a} This is determined by calculating the difference in wins plus the difference in losses divided by two.
^{[b]} The award was not open to the Pacific League until 1989. The award was not given out in the following years: 1971, 1980, 1984, 2000, 2019, and 2024.
