= List of Chunichi Dragons seasons =

The Chunichi Dragons are a professional baseball team based in Nagoya, the chief city in the Chūbu region of Japan. The team plays in the Central League of Nippon Professional Baseball. They began play as Nagoya Club in 1936. The team went through a variety of short-lived names: Sangyo Club (1944), Chubu Nippon (1946), Chubu Nippon Dragons (1947), Chunichi Dragons (1948–1950), Nagoya Dragons (1951–1953) before rebranding permanently to the Chunichi Dragons in 1954.

The Dragons have won the Japan Series two times (1954, 2007), tenth most among all current twelve NPB teams. They have won the Central League pennant nine times, most recently in 2011. Since the Climax Series era began for the Central League in 2007, the Dragons have appeared in the playoffs six times.

== Table key ==
Key to symbols and terms in season table
W	Number of regular season wins
L	Number of regular season losses
T	Number of regular season ties
GB	Games behind from league's first-place team^{[a]}
ROY	Central League Rookie of the Year Award
MVP	Central League Most Valuable Player Award
ESA	Eiji Sawamura Award
MSA	Matsutaro Shoriki Award
Series MVP	Japan Series Most Valuable Player Award
FSA	Fighting Spirit Award

== Season-by-season records ==
Japan Series Champions (1950–present) †	Japanese Baseball League / Central League Pennant (1938–1949, 1950–present)	Climax Series Berth (2007–present) ^

Season	League	Finish	Wins	Losses	Ties	Win%	GB	Playoffs	Awards
Chunichi Dragons
1936	JBL	^{[B]}	7	9	0	.438			
Autumn 1936	JBL	^{[B]}	12	14	0	.462			
Spring 1937	JBL	7th	21	35	0	.375	21		
Autumn 1937	JBL	8th	13	33	3	.283	25		
Spring 1938	JBL	7th	11	24	0	.314	18		
Autumn 1938	JBL	4th	19	18	3	.514	10		
1939	JBL	6th	38	53	5	.418	27.5		
1940	JBL	5th	58	41	5	.586	15.5		
1941	JBL	6th	37	47	0	.440	25		
1942	JBL	7th	39	60	6	.394	33.5		
1943	JBL	2nd	48	29	7	.623	4		
1944	JBL	4th	13	21	1	.382	14.5		
1945	No league play because of World War II								
1946	JBL	7th	42	60	3	.412	22.5		
1947	JBL	2nd	67	50	2	.573	12.5		
1948	JBL	8th	52	83	5	.385	34.5		
1949	JBL	5th	66	68	3	.493	19.5		
1950	Central	2nd	89	44	4	.669	9		
1951	Central	2nd	62	48	3	.564	18		Shigeru Sugishita (ESA)
1952	Central	3rd	75	43	2	.636	7		Shigeru Sugishita (ESA)
1953	Central	3rd	70	57	3	.551	18.5		
1954	Central	1st	86	40	4	.683	—	Won Japan Series (Lions) 4–3	Shigeru Sugishita (MVP); Shigeru Sugishita (Series MVP); Shigeru Sugishita (ESA)
1955	Central	2nd	71	57	2	.597	15		
1956	Central	3rd	74	56	0	.569	10		
1957	Central	3rd	70	57	3	.550	4		
1958	Central	3rd	66	59	5	.527	9		
1959	Central	2nd	64	61	5	.512	13		
1960	Central	5th	63	67	0	.485	9		
1961	Central	2nd	72	56	2	.562	1		Hiroshi Gondo (ROY); Hiroshi Gondo (ESA)
1962	Central	3rd	70	60	3	.538	5		
1963	Central	2nd	80	57	3	.584	2.5		
1964	Central	6th	57	83	0	.407	25		
1965	Central	2nd	77	59	4	.566	13		
1966	Central	2nd	76	54	2	.585	13		
1967	Central	2nd	72	58	4	.554	12		Kentaro Ogawa (ESA)
1968	Central	6th	50	80	4	.385	27		
1969	Central	4th	59	65	6	.476	14		
1970	Central	5th	55	70	5	.440	23.5		Kenichi Yazawa (ROY)
1971	Central	2nd	65	60	5	.520	6.5		
1972	Central	3rd	67	59	4	.532	7		
1973	Central	3rd	64	61	5	.512	1.5		
1974	Central	1st	70	49	11	.588	—	Lost Japan Series (Orions) 4–2	Yukio Fujinami (ROY); Senichi Hoshino (ESA)
1975	Central	2nd	69	53	8	.566	4.5		
1976	Central	4th	54	66	10	.450	21.5		Yasushi Tao (ROY)
1977	Central	3rd	64	61	5	.512	15.5		
1978	Central	5th	53	71	6	.427	20		
1979	Central	3rd	59	57	14	.509	7.5		Kimiya Fujisawa (ROY)
1980	Central	6th	45	76	9	.372	30		
1981	Central	5th	58	65	7	.472	16		
1982	Central	1st	64	47	19	.577	—	Lost Japan Series (Lions) 4–2	Takayoshi Nakao (MVP)
1983	Central	5th	54	69	7	.439	18.5		
1984	Central	2nd	73	49	8	.598	3		
1985	Central	5th	56	61	13	.479	15		Tatsuo Komatsu (ESA)
1986	Central	5th	54	67	9	.446	20		
1987	Central	2nd	68	51	11	.571	8		
1988	Central	1st	79	46	5	.632	—	Lost Japan Series (Lions) 4–1	Genji Kaku (MVP); Kazuyoshi Tatsunami (ROY)
1989	Central	3rd	68	59	3	.535	15.5		
1990	Central	4th	62	68	1	.477	26		Tsuyoshi Yoda (ROY)
1991	Central	2nd	74	56	2	.546	3		Koichi Morita (ROY)
1992	Central	6th	60	70	0	.462	9		
1993	Central	2nd	73	57	2	.562	7		Shinji Imanaka (ESA)
1994	Central	2nd	69	61	0	.531	1	^{[C]}	Masahiro Yamamoto (ESA)
1995	Central	5th	50	80	0	.385	32		
1996	Central	2nd	72	58	0	.554	5		
1997	Central	6th	59	76	1	.437	24		
1998	Central	2nd	75	60	1	.556	4		Kenshin Kawakami (ROY)
1999	Central	1st	81	54	0	.600	—	Lost Japan Series (Hawks) 4–1	Shigeki Noguchi (MVP)
2000	Central	2nd	70	65	0	.519	8		
2001	Central	5th	62	74	4	.456	15		
2002	Central	3rd	69	66	5	.511	15.5		
2003	Central	2nd	73	66	1	.525	14.5		
2004	Central	1st	79	56	3	.585	—	Lost Japan Series (Lions) 4–3	Kenshin Kawakami (MVP); Kenshin Kawakami (ESA)
2005	Central	2nd	79	66	1	.545	10		
2006	Central	1st	87	54	5	.617	—	Lost Japan Series (Fighters) 4–1	Kosuke Fukudome (MVP)
2007	Central	2nd	78	64	2	.549	1.5	Won Climax Series First Stage (Tigers) 2–0; Won Climax Series Final Stage (Giants) 3–0^{D} Won Japan Series (Fighters) 4–1	Norihiro Nakamura (Series MVP); Hiromitsu Ochiai (MSA)
2008	Central	3rd	71	68	5	.511	12	Won Climax Series First Stage (Tigers) 2–1; Lost Climax Series Final Stage (Giants) 3–1^{e}	
2009	Central	2nd	81	62	1	.566	12	Won Climax Series First Stage (Swallows) 2–1; Lost Climax Series Final Stage (Giants) 4–1^{e}	
2010	Central	1st	79	62	3	.560	—	Won Climax Series Final Stage (Giants) 4–1^{e} Lost Japan Series (Marines) 4–2–1	Kazuhiro Wada (MVP)
2011	Central	1st	75	59	10	.560	—	Won Climax Series Final Stage (Swallows) 4–2^{e} Lost Japan Series (Hawks) 4–3	Takuya Asao (MVP)
2012	Central	2nd	75	53	16	.586	10.5	Won Climax Series First Stage (Swallows) 2–1; Lost Climax Series Final Stage (Giants) 4–3^{e}	
2013	Central	4th	64	77	3	.454	22		
2014	Central	4th	67	73	4	.479	13.5		
2015	Central	5th	62	77	4	.446	13		
2016	Central	6th	58	82	3	.414	30.5		
2017	Central	5th	59	79	5	.428	28.5		Yota Kyoda (ROY)
2018	Central	5th	63	78	2	.447	19		
2019	Central	5th	68	73	2	.482	9		
2020	Central	3rd	60	55	5	.522	8.5	^{[F]}	Yūdai Ōno (ESA)
2021	Central	5th	55	71	17	.437	18.5		
2022	Central	6th	66	75	2	.468	15		
2023	Central	6th	56	82	5	.406	29		
2024	Central	6th	60	75	8	.444	16.5		
2025	Central	4th	63	78	2	.447	23		
2026	Central	6th	60	81	2	.426	19		

== Notes ==
^{a} This is determined by calculating the difference in wins plus the difference in losses divided by two.
^{B} Records for 1936 seasons are incomplete.
^{C} Both the Dragons and the Yomiuri Giants were 69–60 before the 130th and final game of the season. In the 1994 Central League tie-breaker game, otherwise known as the "10.8 deciding match", the Giants won 6–3.

^{D} The 2007 Central Climax Series Final Stage was the first and only time the regular season champion did not have a one-win advantage.

^{e} Beginning in 2008, the final stage of the Climax Series awards the regular season champion an automatic one-win advantage that meant they only had to win three games on the field to advance to the Japan Series.

^{F} Due to the COVID-19 pandemic, the Central League decided to send the regular season champion to the Japan Series directly with no Climax Series playoff.
