= Bobby Marcano =

- Infielder
- Born: June 7, 1951; El Clavo, Miranda, Venezuela
- Died: November 13, 1990 (aged 39)
- Batted: Right Threw: Right

NPB debut
- 1975, for the Hankyu Braves

Last NPB appearance
- 1985, for the Yakult Swallows

NPB statistics
- Batting average: .287
- Home runs: 232
- Runs batted in: 817
- Stats at Baseball Reference

Teams
- Hankyu Braves (1975–1982); Yakult Swallows (1983–1985)

Career highlights and awards
- 3× Japan Series champion (1975—1977); 5× NPB All-Star; 4× Golden Glove Award; 4× Best Nine

Member of the Venezuelan

Baseball Hall of Fame
- Induction: 2018
- Election method: Historical Committee

Roberto Marcano Cherubini (June 7, 1951 – November 13, 1990) was a Venezuelan professional baseball player in Nippon Professional Baseball (NPB) and for Tiburones de La Guaira in the Venezuelan Winter League.

Born in El Clavo, Marcano played minor league baseball in the United States from 1969 to 1974, first with the Cleveland Indians organization, and later with the California Angels organization. During the MLB off-seasons he also played for Tiburones de La Guaira steadily from 1969 to 1985.

In 1975, Marcano went to Japan, where he joined the Hankyu Braves as a second baseman. With Marcano putting up big numbers, the Braves went to four straight Japan Series, winning the first three (the first championships in the franchise's history). Marcano played for Hankyu for eight years, then joined the Yakult Swallows for another three. Over the course of his NPB career, Marcano was awarded four Golden Gloves, and was named to the Best Nine four times. He is noted by many sources as being one of the best foreign-born players in Japanese baseball.

Marcano played outfield for Tiburones de La Guaira (representing Venezuela) in the 1983 Caribbean Series.

After retiring from the game, Marcano worked for the Yomiuri Giants as a scout and translator.

Marcano died at age 39, shortly after being diagnosed with cancer. His number 15 jersey was retired by Tiburones de La Guaira.
