= Toshiharu Ueda =

Japanese baseball player and manager

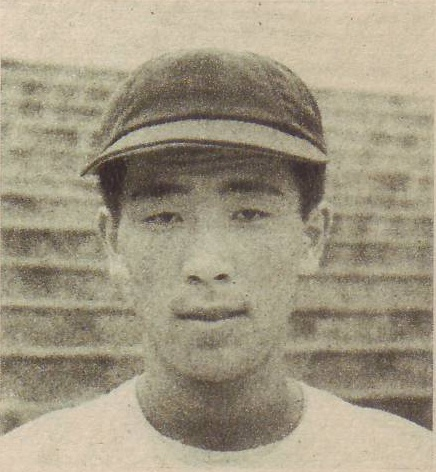
- Toshiharu Ueda in 1956
- Catcher / Manager
- Born: January 18, 1937; Kaifu District, Tokushima, Japan
- Died: July 1, 2017 (aged 80); Kawasaki, Kanagawa, Japan
- Batted: Right Threw: Right

NPB debut
- April 22, 1959, for the Hiroshima Carp

Last NPB appearance
- October 17, 1961, for the Hiroshima Carp

NPB statistics (through 1961)
- Batting average: .218
- Home runs: 2
- Hits: 56
- Stats at Baseball Reference

Teams
- As player: Hiroshima Carp (1959–1961); As manager: Hankyu Braves/Orix Braves (1974–1978, 1981–1990); Nippon-Ham Fighters (1995–1999); As coach: Hiroshima Carp/Hiroshima Toyo Carp (1962–1969); Hankyu Braves (1971–1973)

Career highlights and awards
- 3x Japan Series champion (1975, 1976, 1977)

Member of the Japanese

Baseball Hall of Fame
- Induction: 2003

Toshiharu Ueda (上田 利治, Ueda Toshiharu; January 18, 1937 – July 1, 2017) was a professional Japanese baseball player, coach, and manager. In 20 seasons as a manager, he won 1,322 games and led the Hankyu Braves to three Japan Series titles (which included their first championship in 1975) to go along with five Pacific League pennants. He is one of six managers to win the Japan Series three times in NPB history. He was elected to the Japanese Baseball Hall of Fame in 2003.
