= Mitsuhiro Adachi =

Japanese baseball pitcher (born 1940)

- Pitcher
- Born: March 10, 1940 (age 86); Osaka, Japan
- Batted: Right Threw: Right

debut
- 1959, for the Hankyu Braves

Last appearance
- 1979, for the Hankyu Braves

Career statistics
- Win–loss record: 187-153
- ERA: 2.91
- Strikeouts: 1482

Teams
- Hankyu Braves (1959–1979)

Career highlights and awards
- 3x Japan Series champion (1975–1977); Pacific League MVP Award (1967); 3x Fighting Spirit Award (1967, 1972, 1978)

Mitsuhiro Adachi (足立 光宏, Adachi Mitsuhiro; born 10 March 1940) is a Japanese former baseball pitcher. Mitsuhiro played with the Hankyu Braves from 1959 to 1979.

As one of the most relied upon pitchers for the Braves for two decades, Adachi was a part of nine Japan Series rosters for the Braves. He won the Pacific League MVP Award in 1967, going 20-10 with a 1.97 ERA as the Braves won their first ever Pacific League pennant. Unfortunately, the Braves ran head-on with the Yomiuri Giants, who were in the midst of established the most famed dynasty in NPB history. The Braves would run into the Giants five times from 1967 to 1972 in the Japan Series and lost each time. Adachi was named the Fighting Spirit Award winner (awarded to the best player on the losing team) twice in that span. The Braves returned to the Japan Series for a sixth time in 1975 and finally broke through. He had a no-decision in three of his starts, but the Braves didn't lose any games in the series, winning four and tying twice to prevail over Hiroshima in six games for their first championship. He won two of his starts the following Japan Series and then got a small bit of revenge against the Giants when the Braves defeated them in the 1977 Japan Series for Adachi's third and final championship. In his penultimate season in 1978, the Braves made it back to the Series one more time and lost in seven games, with Adachi (who went 1-1) winning the Fighting Spirit Award once again. No player has won the Fighting Spirit Award more than him. After his career ended, he served as a minor league pitching coach for the Braves and a scout for the Orix BlueWave.
