= Tokuji Nagaike =

Japanese baseball player

Tokuji "Atsushi" Nagaike
- Outfielder
- Born: February 21, 1944 (age 82); Naruto, Tokushima, Japan
- Batted: Right Threw: Right

debut
- 1966, for the Hankyu Braves

Last appearance
- 1979, for the Hankyu Braves

Career statistics
- Batting average: .285
- Home runs: 338
- Runs batted in: 969
- Stats at Baseball Reference

Teams
- As player: Hankyu Braves (1966–1979); As coach: Hankyu Braves (1980–1982); Seibu Lions (1985); Nankai Hawks (1987–1988); Yokohama BayStars (1993–1995); Chiba Lotte Marines (1997–1998)

Career highlights and awards
- 3x Japan Series champion (1975–1977); 2× Pacific League MVP (1969, 1971); 7x Best Nine Award (1967, 1969, 1970, 1971, 1972, 1973, 1975)

Tokuji "Atsushi" Nagaike (長池 徳士, born February 21, 1944) is a Japanese former professional baseball outfielder in Nippon Professional Baseball. He played 14 seasons in NPB, all for the Hankyu Braves, from 1966 to 1979. A two-time Pacific League Most Valuable Player and seven-time Best Nine Award-winner, Nagaike was one of his era's best players in Japan's Pacific League.

In 1967, Nagaike hit .281 with 27 home runs and 78 RBI and was given a Best Nine Award as an outfielder.

In 1969, Nagaike hit .316 with 95 runs scored, 41 home runs, 101 RBI, 21 stolen bases, and a 1.005 OPS, to win the Pacific League MVP Award. That year he led the Pacific League in runs, home runs, and RBI, and won his second Best Nine Award.

Nagaike won another Best Nine Award in 1970 with 28 home runs and 102 RBI to go along with a .309 batting average.

In 1971 he hit .317 with 40 home runs and 114 RBI, to go with a 1.022 OPS, to win his second Pacific League MVP Award and third Best Nine Award. Nagaikie's 87 runs scored led the league. That year he also had a then-league record 32-game hitting streak.

He surpassed 40 home runs and 1.000 OPS each of the following two seasons, with his .290 average, 41 home runs and 95 RBI in 1972 earning him another Best Nine Award. His 1973 stats of 43 home runs and 109 RBI, to go with a .313 average garnered Nagaike his sixth Best Nine Award.

In 1975, the Pacific League instituted the designated hitter. Nagaike hit 25 home runs that season and became the very first player to win the Best Nine Award in the DH position. It was his seventh and final Best Nine Award.

Late in his career, as he became a part-time player, Nagaike's Braves won three straight Japan Series championships, in 1975, 1976, and 1977.

After retiring as a player, Nagaike stayed on as a coach in the NPB through the 1980s and 1990s. Despite his accomplishments, he has not made the Japanese Baseball Hall of Fame, falling short on the ballot as late as 2025.

== See also ==
- List of top Nippon Professional Baseball home run hitters
