= Junichi Fukura =

Japanese baseball player (born 1960)

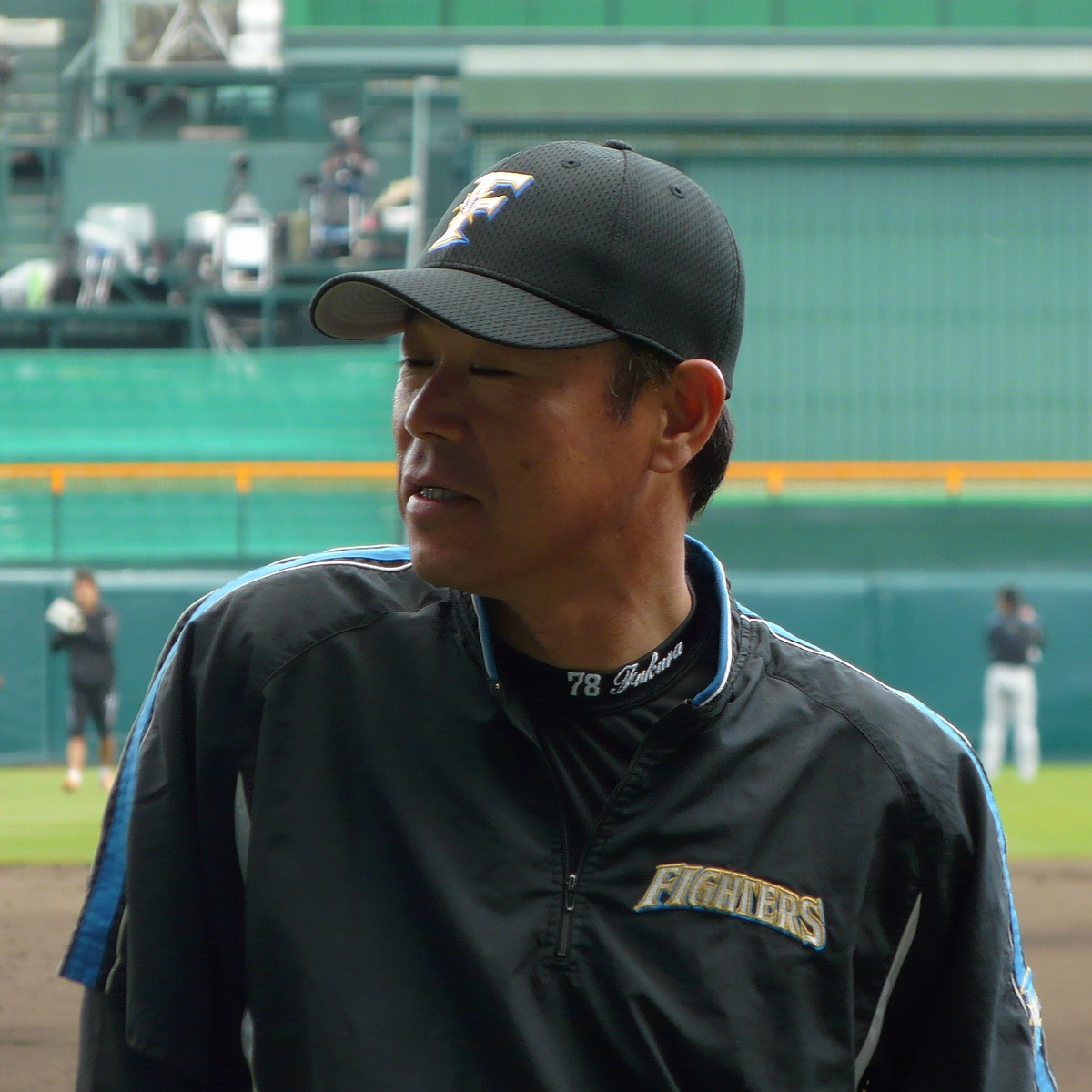
- Infielder / Manager
- Born: 28 June 1960 (age 65); Kitaura, Miyazaki, Japan
- Batted: Right Threw: Right

debut
- 23 April, 1985, for the Hankyu Braves

Last appearance
- 10 October, 1997, for the Orix BlueWave

Career statistics
- Batting average: .279
- Home runs: 50
- Hits: 1116
- Stats at Baseball Reference

Teams
- As player: Hankyu Braves/Orix Braves/Orix BlueWave (1985–1997); As manager: Orix Buffaloes (2016–2018); As coach: Orix BlueWave/Orix Buffaloes (1998–2000, 2013–2015); Hokkaido Nippon-Ham Fighters (2005–2012)

Junichi Fukura (福良 淳一, Fukura Junichi; born 28 June 1960) was a Japanese Nippon Professional Baseball player from Kitaura Town, Higashiusuki District, Miyazaki Prefecture (now Nobeoka City). He was a line-drive hitter.

Junichi Fukura currently serves as the general manager and head of team organization for the Orix Buffaloes. Prior to assuming his current position, he served as the team's 27th manager.

== Biography ==
=== Amateur era ===
He joined the baseball club in junior high school and began playing baseball seriously.

As a sophomore at Nobeoka Technical High School, he advanced to the quarterfinals of the 1977 Autumn Kyushu Tournament, but lost to Yoshihisa Shirotake of Sasebo Technical High School. He did not make it to Koshien during his time at the school.

After graduating from high school, he joined the Japanese National Railways and played for six years in the Oita Railway Administration Office (now the Oita Branch of Kyushu Railway Company, now JR Kyushu) in the amateur baseball league. At that time, he played as a second baseman and was assigned as the first or third batter.

=== Awards ===
- Best Nine: 2 times (1988, 1994)
- Monthly MVP: 1 time (July 1988)

=== Records ===
==== First record ====
- First appearance: April 23, 1985, 4th game against the Nippon Ham Fighters (Hankyu Nishinomiya Stadium), played as third baseman in the top of the 9th inning, replacing Hiromi Matsunaga.
- First hit: May 13, 1985, 9th game against the Nankai Hawks (Hankyu Nishinomiya Stadium), off Kazuhiro Yamauchi in the bottom of the 5th inning
- First start: May 15, 1985, 6th game against the Kintetsu Buffaloes (Hankyu Nishinomiya Stadium), starting as ninth batter and second baseman
- First RBI: May 16, 1985, 7th game against the Kintetsu Buffaloes (Hankyu Nishinomiya Stadium), off Suzuki Keiji in the bottom of the 2nd inning
- First stolen base: Same as above, in the bottom of the second inning (pitcher: Keiji Suzuki, catcher: Shuzo Arita)
- First home run: April 17, 1986, 4th game against the Nankai Hawks (Hankyu Nishinomiya Stadium), 2-run homer in the bottom of the 9th inning off Minoru Yano

==== Milestones ====
- 1,000th game played: August 20, 1994, 17th game against the Seibu Lions (Green Stadium, Kobe), started as the second batter and second baseman. *321st player in history to do so
- 1,000 hits: July 2, 1995, 14th game against the Seibu Lions (Seibu Lions Stadium), first run in the top of the first inning with a timely hit to right field off Hiroshi Shintani. *180th player in history to reach 1,000 hits
- 200 sacrifice hits: May 3, 1996, 6th game against the Fukuoka Daiei Hawks (Fukuoka Dome), off Masao Fujii in the top of the 9th inning. *17th player in history to achieve 200 sacrifice hits

==== Other records ====
- Consecutive errorless defensive opportunities for second baseman: 804, April 28, 1993–July 31, 1994 *Japan record
- All-Star Game appearances: 1 (1988)

=== Jersey number ===
- 51 (1985-1987)
- 1 (1988-1997)
- 85 (1998-2000)
- 78 (2005-2018)

=== Overall managerial record ===
year	Team	Ranking	game	victory	defeat	Draw	Win Rate	Game Difference	Home Run	batting average	Defense rate	age
2015	Oryx	5th place	89	42	46	1	.477	30.0	94	.249	3.59	55 years old
2016	Oryx	6th place	143	57	83	3	.407	30.0	84	.253	4.18	56 years old
2017	Oryx	4th place	143	63	79	1	.444	30.5	127	.251	3.81	57 years old
2018	Oryx	4th place	143	65	73	5	.471	21.5	108	.244	3.69	58 years old
Total: 4 years			518	227	281	10	.447	0 times in A class, 4 times in B class				
