= Motoo Andoh =

Japanese baseball player (born 1939)

Motoo Andoh 安藤 統男
- Second Baseman, Shortstop and Outfielder
- Born: April 8, 1939 (age 86); Japan
- Bats: Right Throws: Right

NPB debut
- Hanshin Tigers

Last appearance
- Hanshin Tigers

NPB statistics
- Batting average: .221
- Hits: 457
- Home runs: 33
- RBIs: 138
- Stats at Baseball Reference

Managerial statistics
- Wins: 178
- Losses: 189

Teams
- As player: Hanshin Tigers (1962–1973); As manager: Hanshin Tigers (1982–1984)

Motoo Andoh (安藤 統男, Andō Motoo) (born April 8, 1939) is a Japanese former baseball player. He played for the Hanshin Tigers from 1962 to 1973 and served as their manager from 1982 to 1984.
