= Kazumi Takahashi (baseball) =

- Pitcher
- Born: June 9, 1946; Fuchū, Hiroshima
- Died: July 14, 2015 (aged 69)
- Batted: Left Threw: Left

NPB debut
- April 15, 1965, for the Yomiuri Giants

Last appearance
- October 22, 1983, for the Nippon Ham Fighters

NPB statistics
- Win–loss record: 167–132
- Earned run average: 3.18
- Strikeouts: 1,997
- Stats at Baseball Reference

Teams
- As player: Yomiuri Giants (1965–1975); Nippon-Ham Fighters (1976–1983); As coach: Yomiuri Giants (1984–1989; 1995–1996; 2002–2005); Nippon-Ham Fighters (1990–1994)

Career highlights and awards
- 2x Eiji Sawamura Award (1969, 1973); 11x Japan Series champion (1965–1973, 1989, 2002)

Kazumi Takahashi (高橋一三, Takahashi Kazumi; June 9, 1946 – July 14, 2015) was a Japanese baseball pitcher.

He played and coached for the Yomiuri Giants and the Nippon Ham Fighters of Nippon Professional Baseball.

He died of multiple organ failure in 2015 at the age of 69.
