= Hisashi Yamada =

Japanese baseball player

Hisashi Yamada 山田 久志
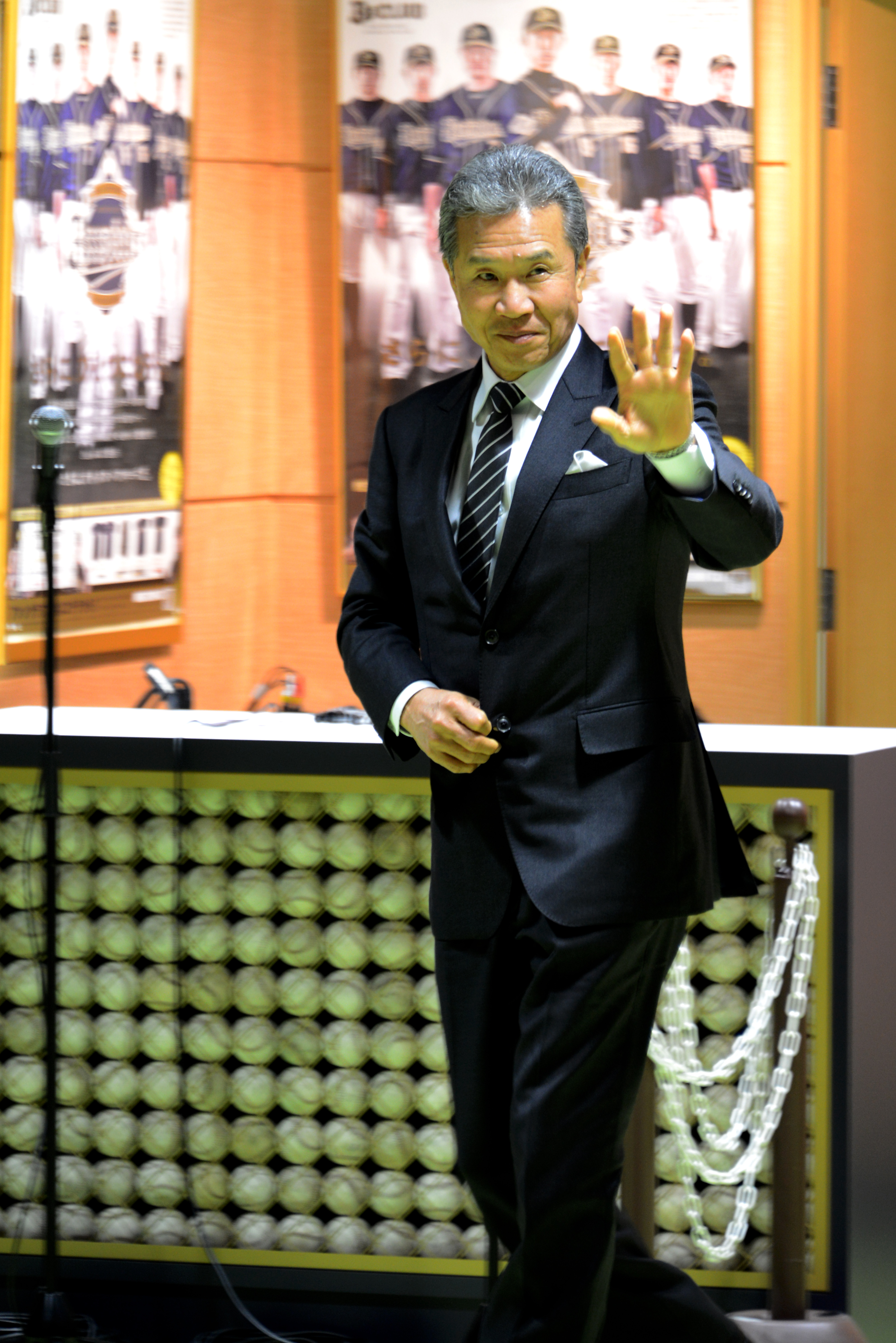
- Hisashi Yamada at Bs SQUARE Open, Kyosera Dome, Osaka, March 7, 2014
- Pitcher / Manager
- Born: July 29, 1948 (age 77); Noshiro, Akita Prefecture, Japan
- Batted: Right Threw: Right

NPB debut
- 1969, for the Hankyu Braves

Last appearance
- 1988, for the Hankyu Braves

NPB statistics
- Win–loss: 284–166
- Earned run average: 3.18
- Shutouts: 31
- Innings pitched: 3,865
- Strikeouts: 2,058
- Stats at Baseball Reference

Teams
- As player: Hankyu Braves (1969 – 1988); As coach: Orix BlueWave (1994 – 1996); Chunichi Dragons (1999 – 2001); As manager: Chunichi Dragons (2002 – 2003)

Career highlights and awards
- 3× Pacific League MVP (1976, 1977, 1978); 3× Japan Series champion (1975, 1976, 1977); Japan Series MVP (1977); 4× 20-game-winner; 5× Best Nine Award (1971, 1972, 1976, 1977, 1979)

Member of the Japanese

Baseball Hall of Fame
- Induction: 2006

Hisashi Yamada (山田 久志, Yamada Hisashi; born July 29, 1948) is a retired Japanese professional baseball submarine pitcher. He played with the Hankyu Braves in Nippon Professional Baseball from 1969 to 1988.

Yamada won the Pacific League MVP for three consecutive seasons (1976–1978), sharing a record with Ichiro Suzuki (1994–1996) for the most consecutive awards won. In addition, Yamada won the Japan Series MVP in 1977. He won 20 or more games four times in his career, including notching 26 victories in 1976. Yamada twice won the Pacific League earned run average championship, with marks of 2.37 in 1971 and 2.28 in 1977. He won the Best Nine Award five times in his career.

As coach of the Chunichi Dragons in 1999, he led the team to the Central League pennant.

He was inducted into the Japanese Baseball Hall of Fame in 2006.

In 2009, Yamada served as a coach for the Japanese team in the World Baseball Classic.

== See also ==
- List of top Nippon Professional Baseball strikeout pitchers
