= El Clavo =

- Town
- Location within Venezuela
- Coordinates: 10°13′28″N 66°10′32″W
- Country: Venezuela
- State: Miranda

El Clavo is a town in the state of Miranda, Venezuela.
