= Izumiya =

Japanese supermarket chain

Izumiya (イズミヤ) is a Japanese supermarket chain operated by Izumiya Co., Ltd (イズミヤ株式会社, Izumiya Kabushiki-gaisha). The company was acquired by H_{2}O Retailing in 2014, making it a wholly owned subsidiary, to raise its profile in the Kansai region.

It operates the Qanat department stores as well as separate Izumiya grocery stores mainly in Kansai region. It also issues the Izumiya Club Cards, the Izumiya credit cards (VISA/MasterCard/JCB) and the Izumiya ETC cards.

The first Izumiya department store vested abroad opened in November 2011 in Suzhou, Jiangsu province, China.
