= 1970 Nippon Professional Baseball season =

1970 NPB season
- League: Nippon Professional Baseball
- Sport: Baseball

Central League pennant
- League champions: Yomiuri Giants
- Runners-up: Hanshin Tigers
- Season MVP: Sadaharu Oh (YOM)

Pacific League pennant
- League champions: Lotte Orions
- Runners-up: Nankai Hawks
- Season MVP: Masaaki Kitaru (LOT)

Japan Series
- Champions: Yomiuri Giants
- Runners-up: Lotte Orions
- Finals MVP: Shigeo Nagashima (YOM)

NPB seasons
- ← 1969 1971 →

The 1970 Nippon Professional Baseball season was the 21st season of operation of Nippon Professional Baseball (NPB).

== Regular season ==
=== Standings ===
Central League regular season standings
Team	G	W	L	T	Pct.	GB
Yomiuri Giants	130	79	47	4	.627	—
Hanshin Tigers	130	77	49	4	.611	2.0
Taiyo Whales	130	69	57	4	.548	10.0
Hiroshima Toyo Carp	130	62	60	8	.508	15.0
Chunichi Dragons	130	55	70	5	.440	23.5
Yakult Atoms	130	33	92	5	.264	45.5

Pacific League regular season standings
Team	G	W	L	T	Pct.	GB
Lotte Orions	130	80	47	3	.630	—
Nankai Hawks	130	69	57	4	.548	10.5
Kintetsu Buffaloes	130	65	59	6	.524	13.5
Hankyu Braves	130	64	64	2	.500	16.5
Toei Flyers	130	54	70	6	.435	24.5
Nishitetsu Lions	130	43	78	9	.355	34.0

== League leaders ==
=== Central League ===
Batting leaders
Stat	Player	Team	Total
Batting average	Sadaharu Oh	Yomiuri	.325
Home runs	Sadaharu Oh	Yomiuri	47
Runs batted in	Shigeo Nagashima	Yomiuri	105
Runs	Sadaharu Oh	Yomiuri	97
Hits	Sadaharu Oh	Yomiuri	138
Stolen bases	Fumihiro Tojo	Yakult	28

Pitching leaders
Stat	Player	Team	Total
Wins	Masaji Hiramatsu	Taiyo	25
Losses	Masaji Hiramatsu	Taiyo	19
Earned run average	Minoru Murayama	Hanshin	0.98
Strikeouts	Yutaka Enatsu	Hanshin	340
Innings pitched	Yutaka Enatsu	Hanshin	337 2/3

=== Pacific League ===
Batting leaders
Stat	Player	Team	Total
Batting average	Isao Harimoto	Toei	.383
Home runs	Katsuo Osugi	Toei	44
Runs batted in	Katsuo Osugi	Toei	129
Runs	Masaru Tomita	Nankai	95
Hits	Isao Harimoto	Toei	176
Stolen bases	Yutaka Fukumoto	Hankyu	75

Pitching leaders
Stat	Player	Team	Total
Wins	Fumio Narita	Lotte	25
Losses	Akira Kawahara	Nishitetsu	19
Earned run average	Michio Sato	Nankai	2.05
Strikeouts	Keishi Suzuki	Kintetsu	247
Innings pitched	Tomehiro Kaneda	Toei	316 1/3

== Awards ==
- Most Valuable Player
  - Sadaharu Oh, Yomiuri Giants (CL)
  - Masaaki Kitaru, Lotte Orions (PL)
- Rookie of the Year
  - Kenichi Yazawa, Chunichi Dragons (CL)
  - Michio Sato, Nankai Hawks (PL)
- Eiji Sawamura Award
  - Masaji Hiramatsu, Taiyo Whales (CL)

Central League Best Nine Award winners
Position	Player	Team
Pitcher	Masaji Hiramatsu	Taiyo
Catcher	Tatsuhiko Kimata	Chunichi
First baseman	Sadaharu Oh	Yomiuri
Second baseman	Motoo Andoh	Hanshin
Third baseman	Shigeo Nagashima	Yomiuri
Shortstop	Taira Fujita	Hanshin
Outfielder	Akira Ejiri	Taiyo
Outfielder	Shigeru Takada	Yomiuri
Outfielder	Toshio Naka	Chunichi

Pacific League Best Nine Award winners
Position	Player	Team
Pitcher	Masaaki Kitaru	Lotte
Catcher	Katsuya Nomura	Nankai
First baseman	Katsuo Osugi	Toei
Second baseman	Hiroyuki Yamazaki	Lotte
Third baseman	Michiyo Arito	Lotte
Shortstop	Toshizo Sakamoto	Hankyu
Outfielder	George Altman	Lotte
Outfielder	Tokuji Nagaike	Hankyu
Outfielder	Isao Harimoto	Toei
