= 1977 Japan Series =

Team (Wins)	Managers	Season
Hankyu Braves (4)	Toshiharu Ueda	69–51–10, .575
Yomiuri Giants (1)	Shigeo Nagashima	80–46–4, .635, GA: 15.0
- Dates: October 22–27
- MVP: Hisashi Yamada (Hankyu)
- FSA: Kazumasa Kono (Yomiuri)

The 1977 Japan Series was the championship series of Nippon Professional Baseball for the 1977 season. The 28th edition of the series, it matched the Central League champion Yomiuri Giants against the Pacific League champion Hankyu Braves. This was a rematch of the previous year's Japan Series, which the Braves won in seven games. The Braves would again defeat the Giants, this time in five games, to capture their third consecutive championship.

== Summary ==
Game	Score	Date	Location	Attendance
1	Braves – 7, Giants – 2	October 22	Hankyu Nishinomiya Stadium	27,971
2	Braves – 3, Giants – 0	October 23	Hankyu Nishinomiya Stadium	31,070
3	Giants – 5, Braves – 2	October 25	Korakuen Stadium	37,914
4	Giants – 2, Braves – 5	October 26	Korakuen Stadium	42,433
5	Giants – 3, Braves – 6	October 27	Korakuen Stadium	41,006

== See also ==
- 1977 World Series
