= Yutaka Fukumoto =

Japanese baseball player and commentator (born 1947)

Yutaka Fukumoto 福本 豊
- Outfielder
- Born: November 7, 1947 (age 78); Ikuno-ku, Osaka, Japan
- Batted: Left Threw: Left

debut
- 1969, for the Hankyu Braves

Last appearance
- 1988, for the Hankyu Braves

Career statistics
- Batting average: .291
- Home runs: 208
- Hits: 2,543
- Stolen bases: 1,065
- Stats at Baseball Reference

Teams
- As player: Hankyu Braves (1969–1988); As coach: Orix Braves/Orix BlueWave (1989–1991); Hanshin Tigers (1998–1999)

Career highlights and awards
- 3x Japan Series champion (1975–1977); Pacific League MVP (1972); Japan Series MVP (1976)

Member of the Japanese

Baseball Hall of Fame
- Induction: 2002

Yutaka Fukumoto (福本 豊, Fukumoto Yutaka; born November 7, 1947 in Osaka, Osaka) is a retired Japanese professional baseball player in Nippon Professional Baseball. An aggressive lead-off man and superior defensive centerfielder, he holds the Japanese career records in triples and stolen bases. He also hit more lead-off home runs than anyone in Japanese history, with 43. In 2002 (Heisei 14), Fukumoto was inducted into the Japanese Baseball Hall of Fame.

== Playing career ==
After a brief career at the company team of Matsushita, he was drafted seventh overall by the Hankyu Braves (currently the Orix Buffaloes) in 1968. In his second season, he stole 75 bases, setting the Japanese single-season record.

In 1972 (Shōwa 47), he stole 106 bases, setting the all-world single-season modern-era record, which stood until it was broken by Rickey Henderson. He also led the Braves to the Japanese championship. Fukumoto was named Most Valuable Player (MVP) and became the first Japanese MVP who had also led the league in steals.

In 1983, he stole his 939th career base, passing Lou Brock and setting the all-world career steals mark (later passed by Rickey Henderson in 1993). That year he also collected his 2000th career hit. He was contacted for a People's Honour Award, but declined.

== Retirement ==
After the 1988 season, the Braves were slated to become the Orix BlueWave. At the last game of the year, manager Toshiharu Ueda delivered a farewell address at the post-game ceremony. Ueda made the mistake of saying, "We bid farewell to Yamada and Fukumoto (who will leave the team) ..." instead of "We bid farewell to Yamada but will have Fukumoto (for the new team) ...". Everyone was caught by surprise, including Fukumoto himself, since he had intended to play at least another year. Fukumoto shrugged to reporters and said, "Ueda said so, I'm retiring", and ended his career. He retired with 2,543 hits, 208 home runs, 449 doubles (2nd all-time), 115 triples, 884 runs batted in, 1,065 stolen bases, and a .291 batting average, in 2401 games.

Fukumoto felt no ill will towards Ueda and went on to coach for Orix in 1989 and 1990. From 1998 to 1999, he coached for the Hanshin Tigers.

He works as a baseball commentator for Asahi Broadcasting Corporation and an independent TV station, SUN-TV.

== See also ==
- List of Nippon Professional Baseball players with 1,000 runs batted in
- List of Nippon Professional Baseball career hits leaders
