= 1976 Japan Series =

| Team (Wins) | Managers | Season |
|---|---|---|
| Hankyu Braves (4) | Toshiharu Ueda | 79–45–6 (.637) |
| Yomiuri Giants (3) | Shigeo Nagashima | 76–45–9 (.628), 2 GA |
- Dates: October 23 – November 2
- MVP: Yutaka Fukumoto (Hankyu)
- FSA: Isao Shibata (Yomiuri)

The 1976 Japan Series was the championship series of Nippon Professional Baseball for the 1976 season. The 27th edition of the series, it was a best-of-seven playoff matched the Central League champion Yomiuri Giants against the Pacific League champion Hankyu Braves. The Braves won the first three games of the series before the Giants then won the next three to force a deciding seventh game, the first time a Game 7 had been played after a team had overcome a 3-0 series deficit since 1958. However, the Braves won Game 7 to win their second consecutive Japan Series championship. This is the only time as of 2025 that a team has forced a deciding game in the Japan Series after being down 3-0 only to lose the final game.

== Summary ==
| Game | Score | Date | Location | Attendance |
|---|---|---|---|---|
| 1 | Giants – 4, Braves – 6 | October 23 | Korakuen Stadium | 40,659 |
| 2 | Giants – 4, Braves – 5 | October 25 | Korakuen Stadium | 47,452 |
| 3 | Braves – 10, Giants – 3 | October 27 | Hankyu Nishinomiya Stadium | 29,241 |
| 4 | Braves – 2, Giants – 4 | October 29 | Hankyu Nishinomiya Stadium | 23,443 |
| 5 | Braves – 3, Giants – 5 | October 30 | Hankyu Nishinomiya Stadium | 26,099 |
| 6 | Giants – 8, Braves – 7 | November 1 | Korakuen Stadium | 44,948 |
| 7 | Giants – 2, Braves – 4 | November 2 | Korakuen Stadium | 45,967 |

== See also ==
- 1976 World Series
