= 1976 Nippon Professional Baseball season =

1976 NPB season
- League: Nippon Professional Baseball
- Sport: Baseball

Regular season
- Season MVP: CL: Sadaharu Oh (YOM); PL: Hisashi Yamada (HAN)

League postseason
- CL champions: Yomiuri Giants
- CL runners-up: Hanshin Tigers
- PL champions: Hankyu Braves
- PL runners-up: Nankai Hawks

Japan Series
- Champions: Hankyu Braves
- Runners-up: Yomiuri Giants
- Finals MVP: Yutaka Fukumoto (HAN)

NPB seasons
- ← 1975 1977 →

The 1976 Nippon Professional Baseball season was the 27th season of operation for the league.

== Regular season standings ==
=== Central League ===
Central League	G	W	L	T	Pct.	GB
Yomiuri Giants	130	76	45	9	.628	–
Hanshin Tigers	130	72	45	13	.615	2.0
Hiroshima Toyo Carp	130	61	58	11	.513	14.0
Chunichi Dragons	130	54	66	10	.450	21.5
Yakult Swallows	130	52	68	10	.433	23.5
Taiyo Whales	130	45	78	7	.366	32.0

=== Pacific League ===
Pacific League	G	W	L	T	Pct.	1st half ranking	2nd half ranking
Hankyu Braves	130	79	45	6	.637	1	1
Nankai Hawks	130	71	56	3	.559	2	2
Lotte Orions	130	63	56	11	.529	3	3
Kintetsu Buffaloes	130	57	66	7	.463	5	4
Nippon-Ham Fighters	130	52	67	11	.437	4	5
Taiheiyo Club Lions	130	44	76	10	.367	6	6

== Japan Series ==
Hankyu Braves won the series 4–3.

Game	Score	Date	Location	Attendance
1	Giants – 4, Braves – 6	October 23	Korakuen Stadium	40,659
2	Giants – 4, Braves – 5	October 25	Korakuen Stadium	47,452
3	Braves – 10, Giants – 3	October 27	Hankyu Nishinomiya Stadium	29,241
4	Braves – 2, Giants – 4	October 29	Hankyu Nishinomiya Stadium	23,443
5	Braves – 3, Giants – 5	October 30	Hankyu Nishinomiya Stadium	26,099
6	Giants – 8, Braves – 7	November 1	Korakuen Stadium	44,948
7	Giants – 2, Braves – 4	November 2	Korakuen Stadium	45,967

== See also ==
- 1976 Major League Baseball season
