= Orix Buffaloes =

Nippon Professional Baseball team in the Pacific League

- オリックス・バファローズ

Logo	Cap insignia

Information
- League: Nippon Professional Baseball Pacific League (1950–present) Japanese Baseball League (1936–1949)
- Location: HQ in Nishi-ku, Osaka, Osaka Prefecture, Japan
- Ballpark: Kyocera Dome Osaka; Hotto Motto Field Kobe
- Founded: January 23, 1936; 90 years ago
- Japan Series championships: 5 (1975, 1976, 1977, 1996, 2022)
- PL pennants: 15 (1967, 1968, 1969, 1971, 1972, 1975, 1976, 1977, 1978, 1984, 1995, 1996, 2021, 2022, 2023)
- Playoff berths: 11 (1973, 1974, 1975, 1977, 1979, 2008, 2014, 2021, 2022, 2023, 2025)
- Former name: Orix BlueWave (1991–2004); Orix Braves (1989–1990); Hankyu Braves (1947–1988); Hankyu Club (1936–1946)
- Former ballparks: Hankyu Nishinomiya Stadium (1937–1990); Takarazuka Stadium (1936)
- Colors: Dark Navy, Gold, White
- Mascot: Buffalo Bull and Buffalo Bell
- Ownership: Yoshihiko Miyauchi
- Management: Orix
- Manager: Mamoru Kishida

Current uniforms

The Orix Buffaloes (オリックス・バファローズ, Orikkusu Bafarōzu) are a Nippon Professional Baseball team formed as a result of the 2004 Nippon Professional Baseball realignment by the merger of the Orix BlueWave of Kobe, Hyōgo Prefecture, Japan, and the Osaka Kintetsu Buffaloes of Osaka, Osaka Prefecture, Japan. The team plays in the Pacific League and is under ownership by Orix, a financial services company founded in Osaka.

The combined team began play in 2005. The Buffaloes split home games between Kyocera Dome Osaka, the home of the original Buffaloes franchise, and Kobe Sports Park Baseball Stadium, the former home of the BlueWave, when the Hanshin Tigers have to use Kyocera Dome. The Tigers' main home stadium, Hanshin Koshien Stadium, is used for the two biggest high-school tournaments in Japan, the Senbatsu in March, coinciding with the opening of the NPB season, and during the Japanese High School Baseball Championship in August.

Through 2026, the franchise's all-time record is 5,732–5,479–401 (.511). The team's current manager is Mamoru Kishida.

== Franchise history ==
=== Hankyu/Orix (1936–2004) ===
==== Hankyu Braves ====
The franchise that eventually became the Orix Buffaloes was founded in 1936 under the ownership of a Japanese railway company Hanshin Kyuko Railway Company (阪神急行電鉄, Hanshin Kyuko Dentetsu; present: Hankyu Hanshin Holdings, Inc.), as Osaka Hankyu Baseball Club (大阪阪急野球協会, Ōsaka hankyū yakyū kyōkai). Later nicknamed the Hankyu Braves (阪急ブレーブス, Hankyū Burēbusu), it was one of the first professional baseball teams in Japan, and the oldest surviving team in the Pacific League.

In the early 1950s, the franchise made a dedicated effort to attract foreign talent, particularly African-American veterans of Negro league baseball, including infielders John Britton and Larry Raines, and pitchers Jimmy Newberry and Jonas Gaines. These players were the first Americans other than Wally Yonamine to play Nippon Professional Baseball after World War II.

Starting in the mid-1960s, the Braves became one of the dominant teams not only in the Pacific League but in all of Japanese professional baseball. Between 1967 and 1972, the Hankyu Braves won the Pacific League pennant five times but lost the Japan Series each time against the Yomiuri Giants. Manager Yukio Nishimoto was known as "the great manager in tragedy" because of those losses. But the Hankyu Braves won Japan Series three times in a row from 1975, against the Tokyo Giants in 1976 and 1977, led by manager Toshiharu Ueda. At that time, many good players in Japanese baseball history played for the Hankyu Braves, including pitcher Hisashi Yamada and outfielder Yutaka Fukumoto.

In the 1980s, the team still was a strong contender in the Pacific League, but lost the PL pennant to the Seibu Lions every year except 1984; that year, the Braves fell to the Hiroshima Toyo Carp in the Japan Series in seven games.

On October 19, 1988, Hankyu Railway sold the franchise to the lease company Orient Lease (since 1989 known as Orix Group), in what was known as "the longest day of the Pacific League". The reason is that when the franchise sale occurred, the Kintetsu Buffaloes played the legendary "10.19" double-header for the Pacific League pennant, only to miss the pennant out because of the second game ending in a tie. For Kintetsu to win the pennant, they had to win both games in the doubleheader against the Lotte Orions. The sale was a surprise; at that time, it was much rarer for a Japanese professional baseball team to change owners, not to mention for a large company to sell one of its parts. In that case, Hankyu Railway was thought of as one of the big companies that would never need to do such a thing. The sale was also a surprise, given that prior to Hankyu founder Ichizo Kobayashi's death in 1957, he decreed that under any circumstances, Hankyu must never sell the Braves and the Takarazuka Revue, both of which were passion projects of his. As it turned out, however, the Braves had to be sold in order for Hankyu to keep the Revue afloat.

The sale was not without two assurances: the team name would remain "Braves", and the franchise would stay in Nishinomiya. During the first two years of new ownership, the team was known as the Orix Braves (オリックス・ブレーブス, Orikkusu Burēbusu) and played in Nishinomiya.

==== BlueWave ====
In 1991, the team moved to Kobe and became the Orix BlueWave (オリックス・ブルーウェーブ, Orikkusu Burūwēbu). Orix put out a poll to decide the new name, and unsurprisingly, people voted Braves. It was said that Orix put out another poll and told fans "Braves" was not allowed. What made it worse was in that second poll, "Thunder" was the winning name, which fit the new color scheme (when Orix bought the team, they changed their colors from black and red to navy blue and gold), and because the team's batting lineup was named Blue Thunder (ブルーサンダー, Burūsandā). But, Orix went with "BlueWave". Longtime fans were shocked by these changes. One member of the Braves' cheering squad (応援団 ouendan) said that "the race was decided before the gun even went off". Another thing that did not make sense to fans was they were named BlueWave while playing in then-named Green Stadium (now Kobe Sports Park Baseball Stadium) in a city whose official color is green. However, since Nishinomiya and Kobe are close to one another, and the new home field of the team was better than the old one, most fans accepted the move, although with some nostalgia for the historic "Braves" name. The team was sometimes called Aonami or Seiha (青波) by fans and the baseball media, which means "blue wave" in Japanese.

Led by Ichiro Suzuki in 1995 and 1996, the Orix BlueWave won the Pacific League pennant. In 1996, they also won the Japan Series. In 2001, Suzuki moved to the Seattle Mariners and led the Mariners to a 116 win season, the most wins by an American League team.

=== Orix Buffaloes (2005–present) ===
Following the 2004 Nippon Professional Baseball realignment, the BlueWave merged with the Osaka Kintetsu Buffaloes. The team struggled since its merger, only finishing in the top half (or A Class) of the Pacific league once from 2005 to 2013. In 2008, The Buffaloes finished second in the Pacific League, going 75–68–1 and finishing 2 1/2 games behind the Saitama Seibu Lions, but were swept by the Hokkaido Nippon Ham Fighters at home in the first stage of the Climax Series. After two seasons of finishing last in the Pacific League, they finished first in 2021, going 70–55–18. They swept the Chiba Lotte Marines in the final stage of the Climax Series to make their first Japan Series appearance since 1996. Ultimately, they were defeated by the Tokyo Yakult Swallows in six games. In 2022, despite a rough start to the season, the Buffaloes finished 1st after a 5–2 win over the Tohoku Rakuten Golden Eagles on the final day of the Pacific League regular season, combined with the Fukuoka SoftBank Hawks losing to the Marines, 5–2, at the same time the game was happening, and also because they had 5 more wins against the Hawks during the regular season, 15–10. The Buffaloes would defeat the Fukuoka Softbank Hawks in the Final Stage of the 2022 Pacific League Climax Series, 4 games to 1, which set up a rematch of the previous year's Japan Series, but this time the Buffaloes exacted revenge on the Swallows, defeating them 4 games to 2. Following that campaign, Masataka Yoshida requested to be posted to MLB, and signed with the Boston Red Sox that offseason. In 2023, an 86-53-4 record yielded them their third straight Pacific League pennant, alongside Yamamoto winning his 3rd consecutive Triple Crown. They swept the Chiba Lotte Marines in the final stage of the Climax Series to make their third Japan Series appearance. However, the Buffaloes were defeated by the Hanshin Tigers in seven games. Yoshinobu Yamamoto's posting to MLB proved to be too much for the Buffaloes to handle, as without their legendary ace, the Buffaloes fell to a record of 63-77-3, ending the year in fifth place. Following that season, manager Satoshi Nakajima announced he was stepping down after he failed to guide the Buffaloes to their fourth straight pennant. He was replaced with Mamoru Kishida.

== Current roster ==
Orix Buffaloes roster
First team		Second team
Pitchers: 19 Taisuke Yamaoka; 21 Sōichirō Yamazaki; 22 Allen Kuri; 28 Ryōga Tomiyama; 48 Kaisei Toumatsu; 49 Raiku Katayama; 54 Reiji Higashiyama; 66 Hiroshi; 68 Kaito Iriyama; 92 Chen Mu-Heng; 95 Kaito Saiki; 96 Taito Takashima; 98 Ryūsei Gonda; Catchers: 2 Kenya Wakatsuki; 32 Shō Fukunaga; 50 Ryōma Yamanaka; 62 Shūna Hori	Infielders: 1 Ryō Ohta; 6 Yūma Mune; 9 Tomoya Noguchi; 24 Kōtarō Kurebayashi; 25 Hō Naitō; 30 Taishi Hirooka; 34 Seiya Yokoyama; 53 Shō Gibo; Outfielders: 0 Haruto Watanabe; 7 Ryōma Nishikawa; 8 Yūsuke Mugitani; 38 Ryōto Kita; 39 Ryōma Ikeda; Manager: 71 Mamoru Kishida; Coaches: 81 Toshio Haru (Head); 88 Katsumi Mizumoto (Roving coordinator); 87 Toshio Saitoh (General); 75 Kazuyuki Atsuzawa (Pitching); 77 Motoki Higa (Pitching); 73 Rui Makino (Pitching); 72 Masafumi Hirai (Pitching); 16 Yoshihisa Hirano (Pitching); 78 Ikki Shimamura (Batting); 82 Keizo Kawashima (Batting); 85 Shinji Takahashi (Batting); 79 Masakazu Fukukawa (Batting); 83 Ryōichi Adachi (Infield defense/base running); 80 Shūhei Kojima (Infield defense/base running); 70 Yūsuke Matsui (Outfield defense/base running); 86 Shintarō Yoshida (Outfield defense/base running); 74 Katsuki Yamazaki (Battery); 97 Masato Matsui (Battery)	Pitchers: 00 Anderson Espinoza; 11 Shunpeita Yamashita; 12 Kōhei Azuma; 13 Naruki Teranishi; 15 Ren Mukunoki; 16 Yoshihisa Hirano; 17 Ryūhei Sotani; 18 Hiroya Miyagi; 20 Shōta Abe; 23 Kōsei Yoshida; 26 Kyōsuke Saitō; 29 Daiki Tajima; 31 Atsuya Fujikawa; 35 Seiryū Kotajima; 36 Haruki Mori; 40 Shō Iwasaki; 41 Ryūga Satoh; 42 Andrés Machado; 43 Shū Takaya; 46 Hitomi Honda; 47 Reo Yamaguchi; 52 Kaede Yokoyama; 57 Nobuyoshi Yamada; 59 Luis Perdomo; 65 Riku Miyaguni; 69 Sean Hjelle; 93 Kazuma Satoh; 94 Kento Kawase; Catchers: 4 Tomoya Mori; 37 Ryō Ishikawa; 44 Yūma Tongū	Infielders: 5 Masahiro Nishino; 10 Kōji Ohshiro; 45 Bob Seymour; 67 Keita Nakagawa; Outfielders: 33 Ryū Sugisawa; 58 Yosuke Kubota; 61 Shōta Hiranuma; 99 Yūtarō Sugimoto; Manager: 76 Naoyuki Kazaoka; Coaches: 89 Hiroshi Kobayashi (Chief); 90 Yūya Oda; 84 Kōhei Suzuki; 91 Daisuke Iida
Development Players
002 Matthew (P); 004 Issei Watanabe (P); 041 Hiroto Suga (P); 044 Taketo Ashida (P); 053 Taiga Uehara (P); 056 Kento Inui (P); 120 Atsuya Kogita (P); 121 Yūki Udagawa (P); 128 Yuito Mae (P); 135 Kōsuke Kawachi (P); 034 Kyōichirō Murakami (C); 055 Kōsuke Tajima (C); 003 Souta Nakanishi (IF); 045 Sōta Kawano (IF); 051 Tomoki Imasaka (IF); 052 Musashi Shimizu (IF); 122 Kōsei Ohsato (IF); 124 Joh Endoh (IF); 126 Kazuya Katsuki (IF); 001 Haruto Mikata (OF); 054 Seiichi Teramoto (OF); 127 Kendai Gen (OF)
Updated October 3, 2026		→ All NPB rosters

== Baseball Hall of Famers ==
Elected mainly for Hankyu Braves service

- Yutaka Fukumoto, CF, 1969–1988 (inducted 2002)
- Takao Kajimoto, P, 1954–1973 (inducted 2007)
- Hisashi Yamada, P, 1969–1988 (inducted 2006)
- Tetsuya Yoneda, P, 1956–1975 (inducted 2000)

Elected for service with other teams, as well as Hankyu and Orix

- Hiromitsu Kadota, DH, 1989–1990 (inducted 2006)
- Futoshi Nakanishi, Head coach / Hitting coach, 1985–1990†, 1995–1997 (inducted 1999) †For Kintetsu Buffaloes
- Akira Ōgi, MGR 1988–1992†, 1994–2001, 2005 (inducted 2004)
- Toshiharu Ueda, MGR, 1974–1978, 1981–1990 (inducted 2003)
- Ichiro Suzuki, RF, 1992–2000 (inducted 2025)

Elected mainly for Kintetsu Buffaloes service

- Yukio Nishimoto, MGR 1974–1981 (inducted 1988)
- Keishi Suzuki, P, 1966–1985 (inducted 2002)

=== Notable former players and managers ===
as Orix Buffaloes

- (United States) Cliff Brumbaugh – RF
- (Mexico) Karim García – OF
- (Japan) Kazuhiro Kiyohara (清原 和博) – 1B/3B
- (Japan) Chihiro Kaneko (金子 千尋) – P
- (South Korea) Park Chan Ho – P
- (South Korea) Lee Dae-ho – 1B
- (Japan) Hiroyuki Nakajima (中島 裕之) – IF
- (Japan) Yoshitomo Tani (谷 佳知) – OF
- (Japan) Yoshio Itoi (糸井 嘉男) – OF
- (Japan) Tomotaka Sakaguchi (坂口 智隆) – OF/IF
- (United States) Ryan Vogelsong – P
- (Dominican Republic) Esteban Germán – IF
- (Japan) Atsushi Nomi (能見 篤史) – P
- (United States) Adam Jones – OF
- (Japan) Ryota Ishioka (石岡 諒太) – IF, OF
- (Venezuela) Marwin González – IF
- (Japan) Motoki Higa (比嘉 幹貴) – P
- (Japan) T-Okada (T-岡田) – IF/OF

as Orix BlueWave

- (United States) Roosevelt Brown – OF
- (United States) Doug Jennings – OF/1B (also known as D.J)
- (South Korea) Koo Dae-sung – P
- (Japan) Yasuo Fujii (藤井 康雄) – IF/OF
- (Japan) Junichi Fukura (福良 淳一) – 2B
- (Japan) Shigetoshi Hasegawa (長谷川 滋利) – P – formerly of the Anaheim Angels and Seattle Mariners
- (United States) Troy Neel – 1B
- (United States) Chris Donnels – 3B
- (Japan) Mac Suzuki (マック 鈴木) – P
- (Japan) Masafumi Hirai (平井 正史) – P
- (Japan) Takahito Nomura (野村 貴仁) – P
- (Japan) Satoshi Nakajima (中嶋 聡) – C
- (Japan) Kazuhiro Sato (佐藤 和弘) (also known as "Punch" Sato) (パンチ佐藤), OF
- (Japan) Masahiko Kaneda (金田 政彦) – P
- (Japan) Koichi Oshima (大島 公一) – 2B
- (Japan) Ichiro (イチロー) – OF – of the Seattle Mariners and New York Yankees of MLB's American League
- (Japan) So Taguchi (田口 壮) – IF, OF
- (Japan) Ryūtarō (竜太郎) – OF

as Kintetsu (and Osaka Kintetsu) Buffaloes

- (United States) Charlie Manuel – OF
- (Japan) Norihiro Nakamura (中村 紀洋) – IF
- (Japan) Masahiro Doi (土井 正博) – OF
- (Japan) Shintaro Yamasaki (山崎 慎太郎) – P
- (Japan) Hideo Nomo (野茂 英雄) – P
- (Japan) Keishi Suzuki (鈴木 啓示) – P
- (United States) Tuffy Rhodes – OF
- (Japan) Masato Yoshii (吉井 理人) – P

as Hankyu (and Orix) Braves

- (Japan) Mitsuhiro Adachi (足立 光宏) – P – underhanded big-game pitcher who defeated the Yomiuri Giants
- (Cuba) Roberto Barbon – IF
- (Japan) Yutaro Imai (今井 雄太郎) – P – once pitched a perfect game
- (Japan) Hideji Kato (加藤 英司) – 1B
- (United States) Brad "Animal" Lesley – P
- (Venezuela) Bobby Marcano – IF
- (Japan) Hiromi Matsunaga (松永 浩美) – 3B
- (Japan) Tokuji Nagaike (長池 徳士) – OF
- (Japan) Kazuhiko Ishimine (石嶺 和彦) – OF
- (Japan) Yutaka Fukumoto（福本 豊）– OF – steal the most bases in NPB up to now
- (Japan) Nobuyuki Hoshino (星野 伸之) – P
- (Japan) Takao Kajimoto (梶本 隆夫) – P
- (Japan) Koji Minoda (簑田 浩二) – OF
- (Japan) Yoshinori Sato (佐藤 義則) – P
- (Japan) Hisashi Yamada (山田 久志) – P
- (United States) Daryl Spencer – IF
- (United States) Greg "Boomer" Wells – 1B (the first non-Japanese triple crown hitter in NPB history)
- (Japan) Masafumi Yamamori (山森 雅文) – OF

== MLB players ==
Active:

- Masataka Yoshida (2023–present)
- Yoshinobu Yamamoto (2024–present)

Former:

- Adam Jones (2020–2021)
- Mac Suzuki (2003–2005)
- Joey Butler (2014)
- Hideo Nomo (1990–1994)
- Shigetoshi Hasegawa (1990–1996)
- Masao Kida (1998, 2000–2001)
- So Taguchi (1992–2001, 2010–2011)
- Koo Dae-Sung (2001–2004)
- Tuffy Rhodes (2007–2009)
- Joey Meneses (2018–2019)
- Ichiro (1992–2000)
- Park Chan Ho (2011)
- Yoshihisa Hirano (2018–2020)
- Brandon Dickson (2013–2021)
- Masato Yoshii (1997–2002)
- Marwin González (2023–2024)

== Regular season records ==
Season	GP	W	L	T	%	GB	Finish	Playoffs
2016	143	57	83	3	.407	30	6th, Pacific	Did not qualify
2017	143	63	79	1	.444	30.5	4th, Pacific	Did not qualify
2018	143	65	73	5	.471	21.5	4th, Pacific	Did not qualify
2019	120	61	75	7	.449	16	6th, Pacific	Did not qualify
2020	143	45	68	7	.398	27	6th, Pacific	Did not qualify
2021	143	70	55	18	.560	—	1st, Pacific	Lost Japan Series (Swallows) 4–2
2022	143	76	65	2	.539	—	1st, Pacific	Won Japan Series (Swallows) 4–2–1
2023	143	86	53	4	.619	—	1st, Pacific	Lost Japan Series (Tigers) 4–3
2024	143	63	77	3	.450	28	5th, Pacific	Did not qualify
2025	143	74	66	3	.529	13.5	3rd, Pacific	Lost Climax Series First Stage (Fighters) 2–0

== Managers ==
#	Years	Seasons	Managers	G	W	L	T	Win%	Pacific League championships	Japan Series championships	Playoff berths
1	1936	1	Daisuke Miyake	48	28	19	1	.596			
2	1937	1	Daisuke Miyake, Minoru Murakami (1st)	105	45	55	5	.445			
3	1938	1	Minoru Yamashita	75	42	30	3	.583			
4	1939	1	Minoru Yamashita, Minoru Murakami (2nd)	96	58	36	2	.617			
5	1940–1942	3	Toshiharu Inokawa	294	163	119	12	.578			
6	1943–1947	4	Masao Nishimura (1st)	343	159	175	9	.476			
7	1948–1953	6	Shinji Hamazaki	720	342	357	21	.489			
8	1954–1956	3	Masao Nishimura (2nd)	436	234	194	8	.547			
9	1957–1958	2	Sadayoshi Fujimoto	262	144	106	12	.576			
10	1959	1	Sadayoshi Fujimoto, Katsuki Tokura	134	48	82	4	.369			
11	1960–1962	3	Katsuki Tokura	407	178	219	10	.448			
12	1963–1973	11	Yukio Nishimoto	1,492	792	655	45	.547	5 times (1967, 1968, 1969, 1971, 1972)		1 (1973)
13	1974–1978	5	Toshiharu Ueda (1st)	650	363	245	42	.597	4 times (1975, 1976, 1977, 1978)	3 times (1975, 1976, 1977)	3 times (1974, 1975, 1977)
14	1979–1980	2	Takao Kajimoto	260	133	111	16	.545			1 (1979)
15	1981–1990	10	Toshiharu Ueda (2nd)	1,300	664	572	64	.537	1 (1984)		
16	1991–1993	3	Shozo Doi	390	195	183	12	.516			
17	1994–2001	8	Akira Ohgi (1st)	1,070	563	481	26	.539	2 (1995, 1996)	1 (1996)	
18	2002	1	Hiromichi Ishige	140	50	87	3	.365			
19	2003	1	Hiromichi Ishige, Leon Lee	140	48	88	4	.353			
20	2004	1	Haruki Ihara	133	49	82	2	.374			
21	2005	1	Akira Ohgi (2nd)	136	62	70	4	.470			
22	2006	1	Katsuhiro Nakamura	136	52	81	3	.391			
23	2007	1	Terry Collins	144	62	77	5	.446			
24	2008	1	Terry Collins, Daijiro Oishi	144	75	68	1	.524			1 (2008)
25	2009	1	Daijiro Oishi	144	56	86	2	.394			
26	2010–2012	3	Akinobu Okada	432	195	216	21	.474			
27	2013–2015	3	Hiroshi Moriwaki	431	207	215	9	.491			1 (2014)
28	2016–2018	3	Junichi Fukura	429	185	235	9	.440			
29	2019–2020	3	Norifumi Nishimura	263	106	143	14	.426			
30	2021–2024	4	Satoshi Nakajima	639	324	285	30	.532	3 (2021, 2022, 2023)	1 (2022)	3 (2021, 2022, 2023)
31	2025–present	1	Mamoru Kishida	143	74	66	3	.529			1 (2025)
Totals	86 seasons		24 managers	11,250	5,543	5,297	410	.511	15 times	5 times	11 times

- Statistics current through the end of the 2023 season.

== Theme song ==
The Buffaloes' current theme song is "Sky" by Japanese band Mega Stopper. The song was first used in 2005. Another version that is used is sung by the club's cheerleading squad, BsGirls.

== Mascots ==
1981–1990
- Bravey (ブレービー) #100, a large bird
- Yuta (勇太) #101, a younger bird
- Braves Boy (ブレーブス坊や), a baseball-headed warrior

1991–2010
- Neppie (ネッピー) #111, a young boy
- Ripsea (リプシー) #222, a young girl

2011–present
- Buffalo Bull (バッファローブル) #111, a male hybrid of oryx and buffalo, Bell's brother
- Buffalo Bell (バッファローベル) #222, a female hybrid of oryx and buffalo, Bull's sister

== Attendances ==
The home attendances of the Orix Buffaloes:

Season	Games	Total attendance	Average attendance
2025	72	2,057,077	28,571
