= 1977 Nippon Professional Baseball season =

1977 NPB season
- League: Nippon Professional Baseball
- Sport: Baseball

Regular season
- Season MVP: CL: Sadaharu Oh (YOM); PL: Hisashi Yamada (HAN)

League postseason
- CL champions: Yomiuri Giants
- CL runners-up: Yakult Swallows
- PL champions: Hankyu Braves
- PL runners-up: Lotte Orions

Japan Series
- Champions: Hankyu Braves
- Runners-up: Yomiuri Giants
- Finals MVP: Hisashi Yamada (HAN)

NPB seasons
- ← 1976 1978 →

The 1977 Nippon Professional Baseball season was the 28th season of operation for the league.

== Regular season standings ==
=== Central League ===
Central League	G	W	L	T	Pct.	GB
Yomiuri Giants	130	80	46	4	.635	–
Yakult Swallows	130	62	58	10	.517	15.0
Chunichi Dragons	130	64	61	5	.512	15.5
Hanshin Tigers	130	55	63	12	.466	21.0
Hiroshima Toyo Carp	130	51	67	12	.432	25.0
Taiyo Whales	130	51	68	11	.429	25.5

=== Pacific League ===
Pacific League	G	W	L	T	Pct.	1st half ranking	2nd half ranking
Hankyu Braves	130	69	51	10	.575	1	2
Nankai Hawks	130	63	55	12	.534	2	3
Lotte Orions	130	60	57	13	.513	5	1
Kintetsu Buffaloes	130	59	61	10	.492	3	6
Nippon-Ham Fighters	130	58	61	11	.487	4	4
Crown Lighter Lions	130	49	73	8	.402	6	5

== Pacific League playoff ==
The Pacific League teams with the best first and second-half records met in a best-of-five playoff series to determine the league representative in the Japan Series.

Hankyu Braves won the series 3–2.

Game	Score	Date	Location
1	Braves – 18, Orions – 1	October 9	Hankyu Nishinomiya Stadium
2	Braves – 0, Orions – 3	October 10	Hankyu Nishinomiya Stadium
3	Orions – 3, Braves – 1	October 12	Miyagi Baseball Stadium
4	Orions – 2, Braves – 4	October 13	Miyagi Baseball Stadium
5	Orions – 0, Braves – 7	October 15	Miyagi Baseball Stadium

== Japan Series ==
Hankyu Braves won the series 4–1.

Game	Score	Date	Location	Attendance
1	Braves – 7, Giants – 2	October 22	Hankyu Nishinomiya Stadium	27,971
2	Braves – 3, Giants – 0	October 23	Hankyu Nishinomiya Stadium	31,070
3	Giants – 5, Braves – 2	October 25	Korakuen Stadium	37,914
4	Giants – 2, Braves – 5	October 26	Korakuen Stadium	42,433
5	Giants – 3, Braves – 6	October 27	Korakuen Stadium	41,006

== See also ==
- 1977 Major League Baseball season
