= 1972 Nippon Professional Baseball season =

1972 NPB season
- League: Nippon Professional Baseball
- Sport: Baseball

Central League pennant
- League champions: Yomiuri Giants
- Runners-up: Hanshin Tigers
- Season MVP: Tsuneo Horiuchi (YOM)

Pacific League pennant
- League champions: Hankyu Braves
- Runners-up: Kintetsu Buffaloes
- Season MVP: Yutaka Fukumoto (HAU)

Japan Series
- Champions: Yomiuri Giants
- Runners-up: Hankyu Braves
- Finals MVP: Tsuneo Horiuchi (YOM)

NPB seasons
- ← 1971 1973 →

The 1972 Nippon Professional Baseball season was the 23rd season of operation of Nippon Professional Baseball (NPB).

== Regular season standings ==
Central League regular season standings
Pos	Team	G	W	L	T	Pct.	GB
1	Yomiuri Giants	130	74	52	4	.587	—
2	Hanshin Tigers	130	71	56	3	.559	3.5
3	Chunichi Dragons	130	67	59	4	.532	7.0
4	Yakult Atoms	130	60	67	3	.472	14.5
5	Taiyo Whales	130	57	69	4	.452	17.0
6	Hiroshima Toyo Carp	130	49	75	6	.395	24.0

Pacific League regular season standings
Pos	Team	G	W	L	T	Pct.	GB
1	Hankyu Braves	130	80	48	2	.625	—
2	Kintetsu Buffaloes	130	64	60	6	.5161	14.0
3	Nankai Hawks	130	65	61	4	.5158	14.0
4	Toei Flyers	130	63	61	6	.508	15.0
5	Lotte Orions	130	59	68	3	.465	20.5
6	Nishitetsu Lions	130	47	80	3	.370	32.5

== Japan Series ==
Yomiuri Giants won the series 4-1.

Game	Score	Date	Location	Attendance
1	Giants – 5, Braves – 3	October 21	Korakuen Stadium	38,010
2	Giants – 6, Braves – 4	October 23	Korakuen Stadium	39,666
3	Braves – 5, Giants – 3	October 25	Hankyu Nishinomiya Stadium	34,582
4	Braves – 1, Giants – 3	October 26	Hankyu Nishinomiya Stadium	31,129
5	Braves – 3, Giants – 8	October 28	Hankyu Nishinomiya Stadium	27,269
