= 1971 Nippon Professional Baseball season =

1971 NPB season
- League: Nippon Professional Baseball
- Sport: Baseball

Central League pennant
- League champions: Yomiuri Giants
- Runners-up: Chunichi Dragons
- Season MVP: Shigeo Nagashima (YOM)

Pacific League pennant
- League champions: Hankyu Braves
- Runners-up: Lotte Orions
- Season MVP: Tokuji Nagaike (HAU)

Japan Series
- Champions: Yomiuri Giants
- Runners-up: Hankyu Braves
- Finals MVP: Toshimitsu Suetsugu (YOM)

NPB seasons
- ← 1970 1972 →

The 1971 Nippon Professional Baseball season was the 22nd season of operation of Nippon Professional Baseball (NPB).

== Regular season ==
=== Standings ===
Central League regular season standings
Team	G	W	L	T	Pct.	GB
Yomiuri Giants	130	70	52	8	.574	—
Chunichi Dragons	130	65	60	5	.520	6.5
Taiyo Whales	130	61	59	10	.508	8.0
Hiroshima Toyo Carp	130	63	61	6	.508	8.0
Hanshin Tigers	130	57	64	9	.471	12.5
Yakult Atoms	130	52	72	6	.419	19.0

Pacific League regular season standings
Team	G	W	L	T	Pct.	GB
Hankyu Braves	130	80	39	11	.672	—
Lotte Orions	130	80	46	4	.635	3.5
Osaka Kintetsu Buffaloes	130	65	60	5	.520	18.0
Nankai Hawks	130	61	65	4	.484	22.5
Toei Flyers	130	44	74	12	.373	35.5
Nishitetsu Lions	130	38	84	8	.311	43.5

== League leaders ==
=== Central League ===
Batting leaders
Stat	Player	Team	Total
Batting average	Shigeo Nagashima	Yomiuri	.320
Home runs	Sadaharu Oh	Yomiuri	39
Runs batted in	Sadaharu Oh	Yomiuri	101
Runs	Sadaharu Oh	Yomiuri	92
Hits	Shigeo Nagashima	Yomiuri	155
Stolen bases	Shigeru Takada	Yomiuri	38

Pitching leaders
Stat	Player	Team	Total
Wins	Masaji Hiramatsu	Taiyo	17
Losses	Hiromu Matsuoka	Yakult	15
Earned run average	Kazuhiro Fujimoto	Hiroshima	1.71
Strikeouts	Yutaka Enatsu	Hankyu	267
Innings pitched	Hiromu Matsuoka	Yakult	281 2/3

=== Pacific League ===
Batting leaders
Stat	Player	Team	Total
Batting average	Shinichi Eto	Lotte	.337
Home runs	Katsuo Osugi	Toei	41
Runs batted in	Hiromitsu Kadota	Nankai	120
Runs	Atsushi Nagaike	Hankyu	87
Hits	Katsuo Osugi	Toei	154
Stolen bases	Yutaka Fukumoto	Hankyu	67

Pitching leaders
Stat	Player	Team	Total
Wins	Masaaki Kitaru	Lotte	24
Losses	Osamu Higashio; Akira Kawahara	Nishitetsu; Nishitetsu	16; 16
Earned run average	Hisashi Yamada	Hankyu	2.37
Strikeouts	Keishi Suzuki	Osaka	269
Innings pitched	Keishi Suzuki	Osaka	291 1/3

== Awards ==
- Most Valuable Player
  - Shigeo Nagashima, Yomiuri Giants (CL)
  - Tokuji Nagaike, Hankyu Braves (PL)
- Rookie of the Year
  - Shitoshi Sekimoto, Yomiuri Giants (CL)
  - Yasuo Minagawa, Toei Flyers (PL)
- Eiji Sawamura Award
  - Not awarded

Central League Best Nine Award winners
Position	Player	Team
Pitcher	Masaji Hiramatsu	Taiyo
Catcher	Tatsuhiko Kimata	Chunichi
First baseman	Sadaharu Oh	Yomiuri
Second baseman	Yasuhiro Kunisada	Hiroshima
Third baseman	Shigeo Nagashima	Yomiuri
Shortstop	Taira Fujita	Hanshin
Outfielder	Jitsuo Mizutani	Hiroshima
Outfielder	Isao Shibata	Yomiuri
Outfielder	Shigeru Takada	Yomiuri

Pacific League Best Nine Award winners
Position	Player	Team
Pitcher	Hisashi Yamada	Hankyu
Catcher	Katsuya Nomura	Nankai
First baseman	Katsuo Osugi	Toei
Second baseman	Hiroyuki Yamazaki	Lotte
Third baseman	Michiyo Arito	Lotte
Shortstop	Toshizo Sakamoto	Hankyu
Outfielder	George Altman	Lotte
Outfielder	Hiromitsu Kadota	Nankai
Outfielder	Tokuji Nagaike	Hankyu
