= 1975 Japan Series =

Team (Wins)	Managers	Season
Hankyu Braves (4)	Toshiharu Ueda	64–59–7 (.520)
Hiroshima Toyo Carp (0)	Takeshi Koba	72–47–11 (.605), 4½ GA
- Dates: October 25 – November 2
- MVP: Takashi Yamaguchi (Hankyu)
- FSA: Koji Yamamoto (Hiroshima)

The 1975 Japan Series was the championship series of Nippon Professional Baseball for the 1975 season. The 26th edition of the series, it was a best-of-seven playoff that matched the Central League champion Hiroshima Toyo Carp against the Pacific League champion Hankyu Braves. The series lasted six games due to ties in Game 1 and Game 4 as the Braves won the rest of the games to sweep the Carp for their first championship in franchise history.

It is the only Japan Series to feature two tied games played.

== Summary ==
Game	Score	Date	Location	Attendance
1	Braves – 3, Carp – 3 (11)	October 25	Hankyu Nishinomiya Stadium	24,694
2	Braves – 5, Carp – 1	October 26	Hankyu Nishinomiya Stadium	36,418
3	Carp – 4, Braves – 7	October 28	Hiroshima Stadium	25,000
4	Carp – 4, Braves – 4 (13)	October 30	Hiroshima Stadium	25,002
5	Carp – 1, Braves – 2	October 31	Hiroshima Stadium	25,077
6	Braves – 7, Carp – 3	November 2	Hankyu Nishinomiya Stadium	30,371

NOTE: Games 1 and 4 ended tied because of 4:30:00 time limit. The current inning at 4:30:00 of play is the last inning.

== See also ==
- 1975 World Series
