= 1978 Nippon Professional Baseball season =

1978 NPB season
- League: Nippon Professional Baseball
- Sport: Baseball

Regular season
- Season MVP: CL: Yutaka Enatsu (YAK); PL: Hisashi Yamada (HAN)

League postseason
- CL champions: Yakult Swallows
- CL runners-up: Yomiuri Giants
- PL champions: Hankyu Braves
- PL runners-up: Kintetsu Buffaloes

Japan Series
- Champions: Yakult Swallows
- Runners-up: Hankyu Braves
- Finals MVP: Katsuo Osugi (YAK)

NPB seasons
- ← 1977 1979 →

The 1978 Nippon Professional Baseball season was the 29th season of operation for the league.

== Regular season standings ==
=== Central League ===
Central League	G	W	L	T	Pct.	GB
Yakult Swallows	130	68	46	16	.596	–
Yomiuri Giants	130	65	49	16	.570	3.0
Hiroshima Toyo Carp	130	62	50	18	.554	5.0
Yokohama Taiyo Whales	130	64	57	9	.529	7.5
Chunichi Dragons	130	53	71	6	.427	20.0
Hanshin Tigers	130	41	80	9	.339	30.5

=== Pacific League ===
Pacific League	G	W	L	T	Pct.	1st half ranking	2nd half ranking
Hankyu Braves	130	82	39	9	.678	1	1
Kintetsu Buffaloes	130	71	46	13	.607	2	2
Nippon-Ham Fighters	130	55	63	12	.466	3	4
Lotte Orions	130	53	62	15	.461	5	3
Crown Lighter Lions	130	51	67	12	.432	4	5
Nankai Hawks	130	42	77	11	.353	6	6

== Japan Series ==
Yakult Swallows won the series 4–3.

Game	Score	Date	Location	Attendance
1	Swallows – 5, Braves – 6	October 14	Korakuen Stadium	34,218
2	Swallows – 10, Braves – 6	October 15	Korakuen Stadium	39,406
3	Braves – 5, Swallows – 0	October 17	Hankyu Nishinomiya Stadium	20,296
4	Braves – 5, Swallows – 6	October 18	Hankyu Nishinomiya Stadium	20,456
5	Braves – 3, Swallows – 7	October 19	Hankyu Nishinomiya Stadium	18,298
6	Swallows – 3, Braves – 12	October 21	Korakuen Stadium	44,956
7	Swallows – 4, Braves – 0	October 22	Korakuen Stadium	36,359

== See also ==
- 1978 Major League Baseball season
