= 1975 Nippon Professional Baseball season =

1975 NPB season
- League: Nippon Professional Baseball
- Sport: Baseball

Regular season
- Season MVP: CL: Koji Yamamoto (HIR); PL: Hideji Kato (HAN)

League postseason
- CL champions: Hiroshima Toyo Carp
- CL runners-up: Chunichi Dragons
- PL champions: Hankyu Braves
- PL runners-up: Kintetsu Buffaloes

Japan Series
- Champions: Hankyu Braves
- Runners-up: Hiroshima Toyo Carp
- Finals MVP: Takashi Yamada (HAN)

NPB seasons
- ← 1974 1976 →

The 1975 Nippon Professional Baseball season was the 26th season of operation for the league. This would be a watershed year for the league at large with the Pacific League officially adopting the designated hitter rule, just two years following its introduction in Major League Baseball with the American League.

== Regular season standings ==
=== Central League ===
Central League	G	W	L	T	Pct.	GB
Hiroshima Toyo Carp	130	72	47	11	.605	--
Chunichi Dragons	130	69	53	8	.566	4.5
Hanshin Tigers	130	68	55	7	.553	6.0
Yakult Swallows	130	57	64	9	.471	16.0
Taiyo Whales	130	51	69	10	.425	21.5
Yomiuri Giants	130	47	76	7	.382	27.0

=== Pacific League ===
Pacific League	G	W	L	T	Pct.	1st half ranking	2nd half ranking
Hankyu Braves	130	64	59	7	.520	1	6
Kintetsu Buffaloes	130	71	50	9	.587	3	1
Taiheiyo Club Lions	130	58	62	10	.483	2	4
Lotte Orions	130	59	65	6	.476	6	2
Nankai Hawks	130	57	65	8	.467	5	3
Nippon-Ham Fighters	130	55	63	12	.466	4	4

== Pacific League playoff ==
The Pacific League teams with the best first and second-half records met in a best-of-five playoff series to determine the league representative in the Japan Series.

Hankyu Braves won the series 3-1.

Game	Score	Date	Location
1	Braves – 7, Buffaloes – 11	October 15	Hankyu Nishinomiya Stadium
2	Braves – 5, Buffaloes – 4	October 16	Hankyu Nishinomiya Stadium
3	Buffaloes – 0, Braves – 3	October 19	Fujiidera Stadium
4	Buffaloes – 3, Braves – 5	October 20	Fujiidera Stadium

== Japan Series ==
Hankyu Braves won the series 4-0-2.

Game	Score	Date	Location	Attendance
1	Braves – 3, Carp – 3	October 25	Hankyu Nishinomiya Stadium	24,694
2	Braves – 5, Carp – 1	October 26	Hankyu Nishinomiya Stadium	36,418
3	Carp – 4, Braves – 7	October 28	Hiroshima Stadium	25,000
4	Carp – 4, Braves – 4	October 30	Hiroshima Stadium	25,002
5	Carp – 1, Braves – 2	October 31	Hiroshima Stadium	25,077
6	Braves – 7, Carp – 3	November 2	Hankyu Nishinomiya Stadium	30,371

== See also ==
- 1975 Major League Baseball season
