= 1969 Nippon Professional Baseball season =

1969 NPB season
- League: Nippon Professional Baseball
- Sport: Baseball

Central League pennant
- League champions: Yomiuri Giants
- Runners-up: Hanshin Tigers
- Season MVP: Sadaharu Oh (YOM)

Pacific League pennant
- League champions: Hankyu Braves
- Runners-up: Kintetsu Buffaloes
- Season MVP: Tokuji Nagaike (HAN)

Japan Series
- Champions: Yomiuri Giants
- Runners-up: Hankyu Braves
- Finals MVP: Shigeo Nagashima (YOM)

NPB seasons
- ← 1968 1970 →

The 1969 Nippon Professional Baseball season was the 20th season of operation of Nippon Professional Baseball (NPB).

== Regular season ==
=== Standings ===
Central League regular season standings
Team	G	W	L	T	Pct.	GB
Yomiuri Giants	130	73	51	6	.589	—
Hanshin Tigers	130	68	59	3	.535	6.5
Taiyo Whales	130	61	61	8	.500	11.0
Chunichi Dragons	130	59	65	6	.476	14.0
Sankei Atoms	130	58	69	3	.457	16.5
Hiroshima Toyo Carp	130	56	70	4	.444	18.0

Pacific League regular season standings
Team	G	W	L	T	Pct.	GB
Hankyu Braves	130	76	50	4	.603	—
Kintetsu Buffaloes	130	73	51	6	.589	2.0
Lotte Orions	130	69	54	7	.561	5.5
Toei Flyers	130	57	70	3	.449	19.5
Nishitetsu Lions	130	51	75	4	.405	25.0
Nankai Hawks	130	50	76	4	.397	26.0

== League leaders ==
=== Central League ===
Batting leaders
Stat	Player	Team	Total
Batting average	Sadaharu Oh	Yomiuri	.345
Home runs	Sadaharu Oh	Yomiuri	44
Runs batted in	Shigeo Nagashima	Yomiuri	115
Runs	Sadaharu Oh	Yomiuri	112
Hits	Shigeo Nagashima; Sadaharu Oh	Yomiuri; Yomiuri	156
Stolen bases	Isao Shibata	Yomiuri	35

Pitching leaders
Stat	Player	Team	Total
Wins	Kazumi Takahashi	Yomiuri	22
Losses	Yoshiro Sotokoba	Hiroshima	20
Earned run average	Yutaka Enatsu	Hanshin	1.81
Strikeouts	Yutaka Enatsu	Hanshin	262
Innings pitched	Yoshiro Sotokoba	Hiroshima	304 1/3

=== Pacific League ===
Batting leaders
Stat	Player	Team	Total
Batting average	Isao Harimoto; Yozo Nagabuchi	Toei; Kintetsu	.333
Home runs	Tokuji Nagaike	Hankyu	41
Runs batted in	Tokuji Nagaike	Hankyu	101
Runs	Tokuji Nagaike	Hankyu	95
Hits	Yozo Nagabuchi	Kintetsu	162
Stolen bases	Toshizo Sakamoto	Hankyu	47

Pitching leaders
Stat	Player	Team	Total
Wins	Keishi Suzuki	Kintetsu	24
Losses	Taisuke Watanabe	Nankai	17
Earned run average	Masaaki Kitaru	Lotte	1.72
Strikeouts	Keishi Suzuki	Kintetsu	286
Innings pitched	Keishi Suzuki	Kintetsu	330 2/3

== Awards ==
- Most Valuable Player
  - Sadaharu Oh, Yomiuri Giants (CL)
  - Tokuji Nagaike, Hankyu Braves (PL)
- Rookie of the Year
  - Koichi Tabuchi, Hanshin Tigers (CL)
  - Michiyo Arito, Lotte Orions (PL)
- Eiji Sawamura Award
  - Kazumi Takahashi, Yomiuri Giants (CL)

Central League Best Nine Award winners
Position	Player	Team
Pitcher	Kazumi Takahashi	Yomiuri
Catcher	Tatsuhiko Kimata	Chunichi
First baseman	Sadaharu Oh	Yomiuri
Second baseman	Shozo Doi	Yomiuri
Third baseman	Shigeo Nagashima	Yomiuri
Shortstop	Taira Fujita	Hanshin
Outfielder	Shigeru Takada	Yomiuri
Outfielder	Dave Roberts	Sankei
Outfielder	Koji Yamamoto	Hiroshima

Pacific League Best Nine Award winners
Position	Player	Team
Pitcher	Keishi Suzuki	Kintetsu
Catcher	Koji Okamura	Hankyu
First baseman	Katsuo Osugi	Toei
Second baseman	Hiroyuki Yamazaki	Lotte
Third baseman	Michiyo Arito	Lotte
Shortstop	Toshizo Sakamoto	Hankyu
Outfielder	Tokuji Nagaike	Hankyu
Outfielder	Yozo Nagabuchi	Kintetsu
Outfielder	Isao Harimoto	Toei

== See also ==
- 1969 Major League Baseball season
