= 1996 Nippon Professional Baseball season =

1996 NPB season
- League: Nippon Professional Baseball
- Sport: Baseball

Regular season
- Season MVP: CL: Hideki Matsui (YOM); PL: Ichiro Suzuki (ORI)

League postseason
- CL champions: Yomiuri Giants
- CL runners-up: Chunichi Dragons
- PL champions: Orix BlueWave
- PL runners-up: Nippon-Ham Fighters

Japan Series
- Champions: Orix BlueWave
- Runners-up: Yomiuri Giants
- Finals MVP: Troy Neel (ORI)

NPB seasons
- ← 1995 1997 →

The 1996 Nippon Professional Baseball season was the 47th season of operation for the league.

== Regular season standings ==
=== Central League ===
Central League	G	W	L	T	Pct.	GB
Yomiuri Giants	130	77	53	0	.592	--
Chunichi Dragons	130	72	58	0	.554	5.0
Hiroshima Toyo Carp	130	71	59	0	.546	6.0
Yakult Swallows	130	61	69	0	.469	16.0
Yokohama BayStars	130	55	75	0	.423	22.0
Hanshin Tigers	130	54	76	0	.415	23.0

=== Pacific League ===
Pacific League	G	W	L	T	Pct.	GB
Orix BlueWave	130	74	50	6	.597	--
Nippon-Ham Fighters	130	68	58	4	.540	7.0
Seibu Lions	130	62	64	4	.492	13.0
Kintetsu Buffaloes	130	62	67	1	.481	14.5
Chiba Lotte Marines	130	60	67	3	.472	15.5
Fukuoka Daiei Hawks	130	54	74	2	.422	22.0

== Japan Series ==
PL Orix BlueWave (4) vs. CL Yomiuri Giants (1)

Game	Date	Score	Location	Time	Attendance
1	October 19	Orix BlueWave – 4, Yomiuri Giants – 3	Tokyo Dome	3:42	45,121
2	October 20	Orix BlueWave – 2, Yomiuri Giants – 0	Tokyo Dome	2:56	45,086
3	October 22	Yomiuri Giants – 2, Orix BlueWave – 5	Green Stadium Kobe	2:56	33,026
4	October 23	Yomiuri Giants – 5, Orix BlueWave – 1	Green Stadium Kobe	3:25	33,070
5	October 24	Yomiuri Giants – 2, Orix BlueWave – 5	Green Stadium Kobe	3:26	33,222

== See also ==
- 1996 Major League Baseball season
