= 1973 Nippon Professional Baseball season =

1973 NPB season
- League: Nippon Professional Baseball
- Sport: Baseball

Central League pennant
- League champions: Yomiuri Giants
- Runners-up: Hanshin Tigers
- Season MVP: Sadaharu Oh (YOM)

Pacific League pennant
- League champions: Hankyu Braves
- Runners-up: Kintetsu Buffaloes
- Season MVP: Katsuya Nomura (NAN)

Japan Series
- Champions: Yomiuri Giants
- Runners-up: Nankai Hawks
- Finals MVP: Tsuneo Horiuchi (YOM)

NPB seasons
- ← 1972 1974 →

The 1973 Nippon Professional Baseball season was the 24th season of operation of Nippon Professional Baseball (NPB). This was the first season with a playoff system, albeit only in the Pacific League, which would match the first-place teams of the first half and second half of the season; if a team finished first place in both halves of the season, they automatically were the champion of the league and therefore went on to play in the Japan Series. On July 11, 1973, a 9-8 victory by the Nittaku Flyers over the Lotte Orions meant that the Nankai Hawks won the inaugural first-half championship. On July 27, the second half began for the Pacific League. On October 5, the Hankyu Braves clinched the second-half in the Pacific when the Lotte Orions lost to the Taiheiyo Lions that would set up a Braves-Hawks playoff series starting on October 19. Meanwhile, the Central League went down to the wire, with the Hanshin Tigers leading with two games remaining before the Tigers hit a lull as the Yomiuri Giants rallied to win the pennant again with a 9-0 victory on October 22 over the Tigers.

This system would continue until 1982.

== Regular season standings ==
Central League regular season standings
| Pos | Team | G | W | L | T | Pct. | GB |
|---|---|---|---|---|---|---|---|
| 1 | Yomiuri Giants | 130 | 66 | 60 | 4 | .524 | — |
| 2 | Hanshin Tigers | 130 | 64 | 59 | 7 | .520 | 0.5 |
| 3 | Chunichi Dragons | 130 | 64 | 61 | 5 | .512 | 1.5 |
| 4 | Yakult Atoms | 130 | 62 | 65 | 3 | .488 | 4.5 |
| 5 | Taiyo Whales | 130 | 60 | 64 | 6 | .484 | 5.0 |
| 6 | Hiroshima Toyo Carp | 130 | 60 | 67 | 3 | .472 | 6.5 |

Pacific League regular season standings
| Pos | Team | G | W | L | T | Pct. | 1st half rank | 2nd half rank |
|---|---|---|---|---|---|---|---|---|
| 1st half winner | Nankai Hawks | 130 | 68 | 58 | 4 | .540 | 1 | 3 |
| 2nd half winner | Hankyu Braves | 130 | 77 | 48 | 5 | .616 | 3 | 1 |
| 3 | Lotte Orions | 130 | 70 | 49 | 11 | .588 | 2 | 2 |
| 4 | Taiheiyo Club Lions | 130 | 59 | 64 | 7 | .480 | 4 | 5 |
| 5 | Nittaku Home Flyers | 130 | 55 | 69 | 6 | .444 | 5 | 3 |
| 6 | Kintetsu Buffaloes | 130 | 42 | 83 | 5 | .336 | 6 | 6 |

== Pacific League playoff ==
The Pacific League teams with the best first and second-half records met in a best-of-five playoff series to determine the league representative in the Japan Series. 13,800 turned out for the first ever Pacific League playoff game on October 19.

Nankai Hawks won the series 3-2.

| Game | Score | Date | Location |
|---|---|---|---|
| 1 | Hawks – 4, Braves – 2 | October 19 | Osaka Stadium |
| 2 | Hawks – 7, Braves – 9 | October 20 | Osaka Stadium |
| 3 | Braves – 3, Hawks – 6 | October 22 | Hankyu Nishinomiya Stadium |
| 4 | Braves – 13, Hawks – 1 | October 23 | Hankyu Nishinomiya Stadium |
| 5 | Braves – 1, Hawks – 2 | October 24 | Hankyu Nishinomiya Stadium |

== Japan Series ==
Yomiuri Giants won the series 4-1.

| Game | Score | Date | Location | Attendance |
|---|---|---|---|---|
| 1 | Hawks – 4, Giants – 3 | October 27 | Osaka Stadium | 27,027 |
| 2 | Hawks – 2, Giants – 3 | October 28 | Osaka Stadium | 28,135 |
| 3 | Giants – 8, Hawks – 2 | October 30 | Korakuen Stadium | 34,713 |
| 4 | Giants – 6, Hawks – 2 | October 31 | Korakuen Stadium | 38,270 |
| 5 | Giants – 5, Hawks – 1 | November 1 | Korakuen Stadium | 37,761 |
