= 1994 Nippon Professional Baseball season =

1994 NPB season
- League: Nippon Professional Baseball
- Sport: Baseball

Regular season
- Season MVP: CL: Masumi Kuwata (YOM); PL: Ichiro Suzuki (ORI)

League postseason
- CL champions: Yomiuri Giants
- CL runners-up: Chunichi Dragons
- PL champions: Seibu Lions
- PL runners-up: Orix BlueWave

Japan Series
- Champions: Yomiuri Giants
- Runners-up: Seibu Lions
- Finals MVP: Hiromi Makihara (YOM)

NPB seasons
- ← 1993 1995 →

The 1994 Nippon Professional Baseball season was the 45th season of operation for the league. The Central League championship was decided by the final game of the year between the Chunichi Dragons and the Yomiuri Giants.

== Regular season standings ==
=== Central League ===
Central League	G	W	L	T	Pct.	GB
Yomiuri Giants	130	70	60	0	.538	--
Chunichi Dragons	130	69	61	0	.531	1.0
Hiroshima Toyo Carp	130	66	64	0	.508	4.0
Yakult Swallows	130	62	68	0	.477	8.0
Hanshin Tigers	130	62	68	0	.477	8.0
Yokohama BayStars	130	61	69	0	.469	9.0

=== Pacific League ===
Pacific League	G	W	L	T	Pct.	GB
Seibu Lions	130	76	52	2	.594	--
Orix BlueWave	130	68	59	3	.5354	7.5
Kintetsu Buffaloes	130	68	59	3	.5354	7.5
Fukuoka Daiei Hawks	130	69	60	1	.5348	7.5
Chiba Lotte Marines	130	55	73	2	.430	21.0
Nippon-Ham Fighters	130	46	79	5	.368	28.5

== Japan Series ==
CL Yomiuri Giants (4) vs. PL Seibu Lions (2)

Game	Date	Score	Location	Time	Attendance
1	October 22	Seibu Lions – 11, Yomiuri Giants – 0	Tokyo Dome	2:57	46,177
2	October 23	Seibu Lions – 0, Yomiuri Giants – 1	Tokyo Dome	2:25	46,342
3	October 25	Yomiuri Giants – 2, Seibu Lions – 1	Seibu Lions Stadium	3:20	31,838
4	October 26	Yomiuri Giants – 5, Seibu Lions – 6	Seibu Lions Stadium	4:12	31,883
5	October 27	Yomiuri Giants – 9, Seibu Lions – 3	Seibu Lions Stadium	3:40	31,872
6	October 29	Seibu Lions – 1, Yomiuri Giants – 3	Tokyo Dome	2:53	46,307

== See also ==
- 1994 Major League Baseball season
