= 1993 Nippon Professional Baseball season =

1993 NPB season
- League: Nippon Professional Baseball
- Sport: Baseball

Regular season
- Season MVP: CL: Atsuya Furuta (YAK); PL: Kimiyasu Kudoh (SEI)

League postseason
- CL champions: Yakult Swallows
- CL runners-up: Chunichi Dragons
- PL champions: Seibu Lions
- PL runners-up: Nippon-Ham Fighters

Japan Series
- Champions: Yakult Swallows
- Runners-up: Seibu Lions
- Finals MVP: Kenjiro Kawasaki (YAK)

NPB seasons
- ← 1992 1994 →

The 1993 Nippon Professional Baseball season was the 44th season of operation for the league.

== Regular season standings ==
=== Central League ===
Central League	G	W	L	T	Pct.	GB
Yakult Swallows	132	80	50	2	.615	--
Chunichi Dragons	132	73	57	2	.562	7.0
Yomiuri Giants	131	64	66	1	.492	16.0
Hanshin Tigers	132	63	67	2	.485	17.0
Yokohama BayStars	130	57	73	0	.438	23.0
Hiroshima Toyo Carp	131	53	77	1	.408	27.0

=== Pacific League ===
Pacific League	G	W	L	T	Pct.	GB
Seibu Lions	130	74	53	3	.583	--
Nippon-Ham Fighters	130	71	52	7	.577	1.0
Orix BlueWave	130	70	56	4	.556	3.5
Kintetsu Buffaloes	130	66	59	5	.528	7.0
Chiba Lotte Marines	130	51	77	2	.398	23.5
Fukuoka Daiei Hawks	130	45	80	5	.360	28.0

== Japan Series ==
CL Yakult Swallows (4) vs. PL Seibu Lions (3)

Game	Date	Score	Location	Time	Attendance
1	October 23	Yakult Swallows – 8, Seibu Lions – 5	Seibu Lions Stadium	3:39	31,785
2	October 24	Yakult Swallows – 5, Seibu Lions – 2	Seibu Lions Stadium	3:34	32,169
3	October 26	Seibu Lions – 7, Yakult Swallows – 2	Meiji Jingu Stadium	2:38	30,147
4	October 27	Seibu Lions – 0, Yakult Swallows – 1	Meiji Jingu Stadium	2:51	33,882
5	October 28	Seibu Lions – 7, Yakult Swallows – 2	Meiji Jingu Stadium	3:19	35,208
6	October 31	Yakult Swallows – 2, Seibu Lions – 4	Seibu Lions Stadium	2:49	32,020
7	November 1	Yakult Swallows – 4, Seibu Lions – 2	Seibu Lions Stadium	2:48	32,028

== See also ==
- 1993 Major League Baseball season
