= 1995 Nippon Professional Baseball season =

1995 NPB season
- League: Nippon Professional Baseball
- Sport: Baseball

Regular season
- Season MVP: CL: Tom O'Malley (YAK); PL: Ichiro Suzuki (ORI)

League postseason
- CL champions: Yakult Swallows
- CL runners-up: Hiroshima Toyo Carp
- PL champions: Orix BlueWave
- PL runners-up: Chiba Lotte Marines

Japan Series
- Champions: Yakult Swallows
- Runners-up: Orix BlueWave
- Finals MVP: Tom O'Malley (YAK)

NPB seasons
- ← 1994 1996 →

The 1995 Nippon Professional Baseball season was the 46th season of operation for the league.

== Regular season standings ==
=== Central League ===
Central League	G	W	L	T	Pct.	GB
Yakult Swallows	130	82	48	0	.631	--
Hiroshima Toyo Carp	131	74	56	1	.569	8.0
Yomiuri Giants	131	72	58	1	.554	10.0
Yokohama BayStars	130	66	64	0	.508	16.0
Chunichi Dragons	130	50	80	0	.385	32.0
Hanshin Tigers	130	46	84	0	.354	36.0

=== Pacific League ===
Pacific League	G	W	L	T	Pct.	GB
Orix BlueWave	130	82	47	1	.636	--
Chiba Lotte Marines	130	69	58	3	.543	12.0
Seibu Lions	130	67	57	6	.540	12.5
Nippon-Ham Fighters	130	59	68	3	.465	22.0
Fukuoka Daiei Hawks	130	54	72	4	.429	26.5
Kintetsu Buffaloes	130	49	78	3	.386	32.0

== Japan Series ==
CL Yakult Swallows (4) vs. PL Orix BlueWave (1)

Game	Date	Score	Location	Time	Attendance
1	October 21	Yakult Swallows – 5, Orix BlueWave – 2	Green Stadium Kobe	3:14	32,486
2	October 22	Yakult Swallows – 3, Orix BlueWave – 2	Green Stadium Kobe	3:50	32,475
3	October 24	Orix BlueWave – 4, Yakult Swallows – 7	Meiji Jingu Stadium	4:25	32,915
4	October 25	Orix BlueWave – 2, Yakult Swallows – 1	Meiji Jingu Stadium	4:38	32,911
5	October 26	Orix BlueWave – 1, Yakult Swallows – 3	Meiji Jingu Stadium	3:14	33,112

== See also ==
- 1995 Major League Baseball season
