= Hankyu Nishinomiya Stadium =

Baseball stadium in Nishinomiya, Hyōgo

Coordinates: 34°44′37″N 135°21′38″E

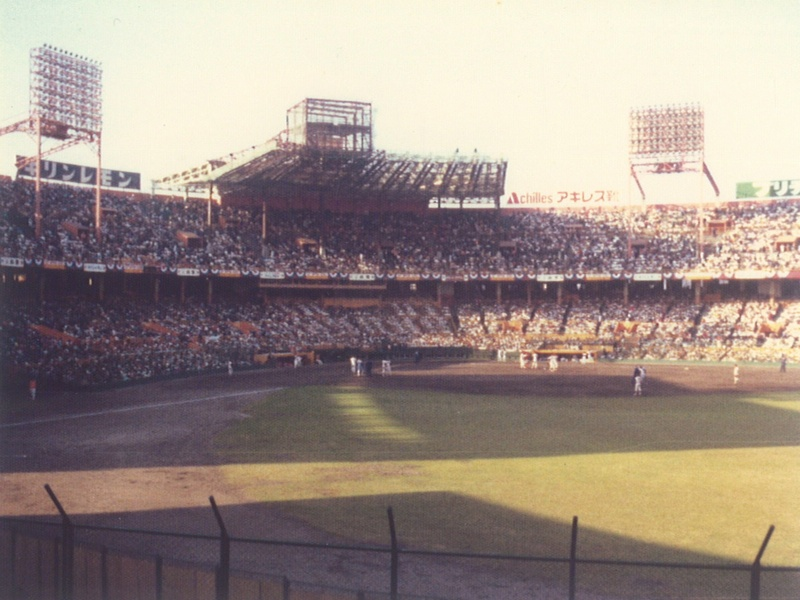
- Hankyu Nishinomiya Stadium in 1977
- Interactive map of Hankyu Nishinomiya Stadium
- Location: Takamatsucho, Nishinomiya, Hyōgo Prefecture, Japan
- Owner: Hankyu Corporation
- Capacity: 35,000
- Field size: Left Field: 91.4 m (-1977), 101 m (1978-); Center Field: 118.9 m Right Field: 91.4 m (-1977), 101 m (1978-)

Construction
- Opened: 1937-05-01
- Closed: 2002-12-31
- Demolished: from September 1, 2004 until summer 2005
- Main contractor: Takenaka Corporation

Tenants
- Hankyu Braves (Pacific League/NPB, 1937–1988)→Orix Braves (Pacific League/NPB, 1989–1990)

Hankyu Nishinomiya Stadium (阪急西宮スタジアム) was a baseball stadium in Nishinomiya, Hyōgo, Japan. The stadium was opened in 1937 and had a capacity of 35,000 people. It was used as a football and rugby stadium too.

It was primarily used for baseball and was home of the Orix Braves (Hankyu Braves), until they moved to Kobe Stadium, in 1991. In 1946, during the occupation of Japan while much of the country was being rebuilt, it was temporarily the shared home of the Nankai Hawks.

Queen performed a concert there for their Hot Space Tour in 1982. Madonna performed three sold-out concerts at the stadium during her Blond Ambition Tour in April 1990. Michael Jackson also performed three sold-out concerts at the venue during his Bad World Tour in 1987. Ayumi Hamasaki performed two sold-out concerts at the stadium during her Stadium Tour 2002 A.

The stadium was closed on December 31, 2002 and was demolished from September 1, 2004 until 2005.

Hankyu Nishinomiya Gardens, a shopping mall containing a Hankyu Department Store, an Izumiya supermarket, Toho cinemas, and dozens of smaller clothing, fashion, and food outlets, was opened on November 26, 2008, on the vacant lot where the stadium used to be.

== See also ==
- Nishinomiya-Kitaguchi Station

Preceded by Takarazuka Stadium	Home of the Orix Braves; 1937 – 1990	Succeeded by Kobe Stadium
Preceded by Koshien	Site of the Koshien Bowl; 1960	Succeeded by Koshien
