= List of Fukuoka SoftBank Hawks seasons =

The Fukuoka SoftBank Hawks are a professional baseball team based in Fukuoka, Fukuoka Prefecture. The Hawks play in the Pacific League of Nippon Professional Baseball. They began play in 1938 as the Nankai Club for the Japanese Baseball League that played in Osaka. They subsequently rebranded as the Kinki Nippon Club and Kinki Great Ring before playing the next 41 years as the Nankai Hawks, starting in 1947. They won the JBL pennant twice in 1946 and 1948. They rebranded again to become the Fukuoka Daiei Hawks in 1989 with the purchase by department store chain Daiei, who moved the team to Fukuoka. In 2004, they became the Fukuoka SoftBank Hawks after the sale to SoftBank Group on January 28, 2005.

Since the formation of NPB in 1950, in their 76 seasons, the franchise has won 12 Japan Series championships, third most in NPB history while finishing first in the Pacific League 26 times with 22 appearances in the Series. Since the introduction of the playoff system in the Pacific League in 2004, the Hawks have made the Climax Series 19 times.

== Season-by-season records ==
Key to colors

| † | Japan Series champions |
| * | Japanese Baseball League champions Pacific League champions |
| ^ | Playoff berth |

Key to abbreviations

- JBL - Japanese Baseball League
- PL – Pacific League
- W – Wins
- L – Losses
- T – Ties
- GB - Games behind^{[a]}
- CS – Climax Series

Key to awards

- ESA – Eiji Sawamura Award^{[b]}
- JS MVP – Japan Series Most Valuable Player Award
- MSA – Matsutaro Shoriki Award
- MVP – Most Valuable Player Award
- ROY – Rookie of the Year Award

| Season | League | Regular season | | | | | | | | Postseason (Climax & Japan Series) | Manager(s) | Awards | Home attendance^{[d]} | Notes |
| Season | League | Finish^{[c]} | | W | L | T | Win% | GB | | Postseason (Climax & Japan Series) | Manager(s) | Awards | Home attendance^{[d]} | Notes |
|---|---|---|---|---|---|---|---|---|---|---|---|---|---|---|
Nankai Club
| 1938 fall | JBL | 8th | | 11 | 26 | 3 | .297 | 18 | | — | Kazuo Takasu | | | |
| 1939 | JBL | 5th | | 40 | 50 | 6 | .444 | 25 | | — | Kazuo Takasu; Hachiro Mitani | | | |
| 1940 | JBL | 8th | | 28 | 71 | 6 | .283 | 45 1/2 | | — | Kazuo Takasu | | | |
| 1941 | JBL | 4th | | 43 | 41 | 0 | .512 | 19 | | — | Hachiro Mitani | | | |
| 1942 | JBL | 6th | | 49 | 56 | 0 | .467 | 26 1/2 | | — | Hachiro Mitani; Kisaku Kato | | | |
| 1943 | JBL | 8th | | 26 | 56 | 2 | .317 | 28 1/2 | | — | Katsuo Takada; Kisaku Kato | | | |
Kinki Nippon Club
| 1944 | JBL | 6th | | 11 | 23 | 1 | .324 | 16 1/2 | | — | Kisaku Kato | | | |
| 1945 | Season canceled | | | | | | | | | | | | | |
Kinki Great Ring
| 1946 | JBL* | 1st | | 65 | 38 | 2 | .631 | — | | — | Kazuto Tsuruoka | Kazuto Tsuruoka (MVP) | | |
Nankai Hawks
| 1947 | JBL | 3rd | | 59 | 55 | 5 | .518 | 19 | | — | Kazuto Tsuruoka | | | |
| 1948 | JBL* | 1st | | 87 | 49 | 4 | .640 | — | | — | Kazuto Tsuruoka | Kazuto Tsuruoka (MVP) | | |
| 1949 | JBL | 4th | | 67 | 67 | 1 | .500 | 18 1/2 | | — | Kazuto Tsuruoka | | | |
| 1950 | PL | 2nd | | 66 | 49 | 5 | .574 | 15 | | | Kazuto Tsuruoka | | Unknown | |
| 1951 | PL* | 1st | | 72 | 24 | 8 | .750 | — | | Lost Japan Series (Yomiuri) 4–1 | Kazuto Tsuruoka | Kazuo Kageyama (ROY); Kazuto Tsuruoka (MVP) | Unknown | |
| 1952 | PL* | 1st | | 76 | 44 | 1 | .633 | — | | Lost Japan Series (Yomiuri) 4–2 | Kazuto Tsuruoka | Susumu Yuki (MVP) | 656,002 | |
| 1953 | PL* | 1st | | 71 | 48 | 1 | .597 | — | | Lost Japan Series (Yomiuri) 4–2–1 | Kazuto Tsuruoka | Isami Okamoto (MVP) | 769,500 | |
| 1954 | PL | 2nd | | 91 | 49 | 0 | .650 | 1/2 | | | Kazuto Tsuruoka | Motoji Takuwa (ROY) | 736,500 | |
| 1955 | PL* | 1st | | 99 | 41 | 3 | .707 | — | | Lost in Japan Series (Yomiuri) 4–3 | Kazuto Tsuruoka | Tokuji Iida (MVP) | 749,300 | |
| 1956 | PL | 2nd | | 96 | 52 | 6 | .643 | 1/2 | | | Kazuto Tsuruoka | | 713,900 | |
| 1957 | PL | 2nd | | 78 | 53 | 1 | .595 | 7 | | | Kazuto Tsuruoka | Tamotsu Kimura (ROY) | 603,700 | |
| 1958 | PL | 2nd | | 77 | 48 | 5 | .612 | 1 | | | Kazuto Tsuruoka | Tadashi Sugiura (ROY) | 743,600 | |
| 1959^{†} | PL* | 1st | | 88 | 42 | 4 | .677 | — | | Won Japan Series (Yomiuri) 4–0 | Kazuto Tsuruoka | Tadashi Sugiura (JS MVP, MVP) | 858,869 | |
| 1960 | PL | 2nd | | 78 | 52 | 6 | .600 | 4 | | | Kazuto Tsuruoka | | 701,417 | |
| 1961 | PL* | 1st | | 85 | 49 | 6 | .629 | — | | Lost Japan Series (Yomiuri) 4–2 | Kazuto Tsuruoka | Katsuya Nomura (MVP) | 897,090 | |
| 1962 | PL | 2nd | | 73 | 57 | 3 | .562 | 5 | | | Kazuto Tsuruoka | | 628,877 | |
| 1963 | PL | 2nd | | 85 | 61 | 4 | .582 | 1 | | | Kazuto Tsuruoka | Katsuya Nomura (MVP) | 727,468 | |
| 1964^{†} | PL* | 1st | | 84 | 63 | 3 | .571 | — | | Won Japan Series (Hanshin) 4–3 | Kazuto Tsuruoka | Joe Stanka (JS MVP, MVP) | 646,235 | |
| 1965 | PL* | 1st | | 88 | 49 | 3 | .642 | — | | Lost Japan Series (Yomiuri) 4–1 | Kazuto Tsuruoka | Katsuya Nomura (MVP) | 556,811 | |
| 1966 | PL* | 1st | | 79 | 51 | 3 | .608 | — | | Lost Japan Series (Yomiuri) 4–2 | Kazuto Tsuruoka | Katsuya Nomura (MVP) | 572,371 | |
| 1967 | PL | 4th | | 64 | 66 | 3 | .492 | 11 | | | Kazuto Tsuruoka | | 532,493 | |
| 1968 | PL | 2nd | | 79 | 51 | 6 | .608 | 1 | | | Kazuto Tsuruoka | | 632,450 | |
| 1969 | PL | 6th | | 50 | 76 | 4 | .397 | 26 | | | Tokuji Iida | | 474,072 | |
| 1970 | PL | 2nd | | 69 | 57 | 4 | .548 | 10 1/2 | | | Katsuya Nomura | Michio Sato (ROY) | 453,980 | |
| 1971 | PL | 4th | | 61 | 65 | 4 | .484 | 22 1/2 | | | Katsuya Nomura | | 452,400 | |
| 1972 | PL | 3rd | | 65 | 61 | 4 | .516 | 14 | | | Katsuya Nomura | | 475,200 | |
| 1973 | PL* | 1st^ | 3rd | 68 | 58 | 4 | .540 | — | 13 | Won PL Playoffs (Hankyu) 3–2; Lost Japan Series (Yomiuri) 4–1 | Katsuya Nomura | Katsuya Nomura (MVP) | 657,700 | |
| 1974 | PL | 4th | 2nd | 59 | 55 | 16 | .518 | 7 | 5 | | Katsuya Nomura | | 564,100 | |
| 1975 | PL | 5th | 3rd | 57 | 65 | 8 | .467 | 9 | 11 1/2 | | Katsuya Nomura | | 472,900 | |
| 1976 | PL | 2nd | 2nd | 71 | 56 | 3 | .559 | 7 1/2 | 2 | | Katsuya Nomura | Manabu Fujita (ROY) | 554,000 | |
| 1977 | PL | 2nd | 3rd | 63 | 55 | 12 | .534 | 1 1/2 | 4 | | Katsuya Nomura | | 641,000 | |
| 1978 | PL | 6th | 6th | 42 | 77 | 11 | .353 | 20 1/2 | 18 1/2 | | Yoshinori Hirose | Yukihiro Murakami (ROY) | 444,000 | |
| 1979 | PL | 5th | 6th | 46 | 73 | 11 | .387 | 18 | 12 | | Yoshinori Hirose | | 466,000 | |
| 1980 | PL | 5th | 6th | 48 | 77 | 5 | .384 | 7 | 16 | | Yoshinori Hirose | | 603,500 | |
| 1981 | PL | 5th | 6th | 53 | 65 | 12 | .449 | 6 | 11 1/2 | | Don Blasingame | | 546,500 | |
| 1982 | PL | 5th | 6th | 53 | 71 | 6 | .427 | 8 | 11 1/2 | | Don Blasingame | | 439,000 | |
| 1983 | PL | 5th | | 52 | 69 | 9 | .430 | 31 1/2 | | | Yoshio Anabuki | | 650,000 | |
| 1984 | PL | 5th | | 53 | 65 | 12 | .449 | 21 | | | Yoshio Anabuki | | 610,000 | |
| 1985 | PL | 6th | | 44 | 76 | 10 | .367 | 33 | | | Yoshio Anabuki | | 553,000 | |
| 1986 | PL | 6th | | 49 | 73 | 8 | .402 | 21 1/2 | | | Tadashi Sugiura | | 603,000 | |
| 1987 | PL | 4th | | 57 | 63 | 10 | .475 | 16 | | | Tadashi Sugiura | | 883,000 | |
| 1988 | PL | 5th | | 58 | 71 | 1 | .450 | 17 1/2 | | | Tadashi Sugiura | Hiromitsu Kadota (MSA, MVP) | 918,000 | |
Fukuoka Daiei Hawks
| 1989 | PL | 4th | | 59 | 64 | 7 | .480 | 11 | | | Tadashi Sugiura | | 1,251,000 | |
| 1990 | PL | 6th | | 41 | 85 | 4 | .325 | 40 | | | Koichi Tabuchi | | 1,346,000 | |
| 1991 | PL | 5th | | 53 | 73 | 4 | .421 | 29 | | | Koichi Tabuchi | | 1,573,000 | |
| 1992 | PL | 4th | | 57 | 72 | 1 | .442 | 24 | | | Koichi Tabuchi | | 1,677,000 | |
| 1993 | PL | 6th | | 45 | 80 | 5 | .360 | 28 | | | Rikuo Nemoto | | 2,462,000 | |
| 1994 | PL | 4th | | 69 | 60 | 1 | .535 | 7 1/2 | | | Rikuo Nemoto | Hidekazu Watanabe (ROY) | 2,525,000 | |
| 1995 | PL | 5th | | 54 | 72 | 4 | .429 | 26 1/2 | | | Sadaharu Oh | | 2,493,000 | |
| 1996 | PL | 6th | | 54 | 74 | 2 | .422 | 22 | | | Sadaharu Oh | | 2,207,000 | |
| 1997 | PL | 4th | | 63 | 71 | 1 | .470 | 14 | | | Sadaharu Oh | | 2,307,000 | |
| 1998 | PL | 3rd | | 67 | 67 | 1 | .500 | 4 1/2 | | | Sadaharu Oh | | 2,163,000 | |
| 1999^{†} | PL* | 1st | | 78 | 54 | 3 | .591 | — | | Won Japan Series (Chunichi) 4–1 | Sadaharu Oh | Koji Akiyama (JS MVP); Kimiyasu Kudo (MVP); Sadaharu Oh (MSA) | 2,390,000 | |
| 2000 | PL* | 1st | | 73 | 60 | 2 | .549 | — | | Lost Japan Series (Yomiuri) 4–2 | Sadaharu Oh | Nobuhiko Matsunaka (MVP) | 2,786,000 | |
| 2001 | PL | 2nd | | 76 | 63 | 1 | .547 | 2 1/2 | | | Sadaharu Oh | | 3,087,000 | |
| 2002 | PL | 2nd | | 73 | 65 | 2 | .529 | 16 1/2 | | | Sadaharu Oh | | 3,108,000 | |
| 2003^{†} | PL* | 1st | | 82 | 55 | 3 | .599 | — | | Won Japan Series (Hanshin) 4–3 | Sadaharu Oh | Kenji Johjima (MVP); Sadaharu Oh (MSA); Kazumi Saito (ESA); Toshiya Sugiuchi (JS MVP); Tsuyoshi Wada (ROY) | 3,228,000 | |
| 2004 | PL | 1st^ | | 77 | 52 | 5 | .597 | — | | Lost Playoffs Second Stage (Seibu) 3–2 | Sadaharu Oh | Nobuhiko Matsunaka (MVP); Koji Mise (ROY) | 3,070,000 | |
Fukuoka SoftBank Hawks
| 2005 | PL | 1st^ | | 89 | 45 | 2 | .664 | — | | Lost Playoffs Second Stage (Lotte) 3–2 | Sadaharu Oh | Toshiya Sugiuchi (ESA, MVP) | 2,115,977 | |
| 2006 | PL | 3rd^ | | 75 | 56 | 5 | .573 | 4 1/2 | | Won Playoffs First Stage (Seibu) 2–1; Lost Playoffs Second Stage (Nippon-Ham) 3–0^{[e]} | Sadaharu Oh | Sadaharu Oh (MSA); Kazumi Saito (ESA) | 2,037,556 | |
| 2007 | PL | 3rd^ | | 73 | 66 | 5 | .525 | 6 | | Lost CS First Stage (Lotte) 2–1 | Sadaharu Oh | | 2,307,160 | |
| 2008 | PL | 6th | | 64 | 77 | 3 | .454 | 12 1/2 | | | Sadaharu Oh | | 2,250,044 | |
| 2009 | PL | 3rd^ | | 74 | 65 | 5 | .532 | 6 1/2 | | Lost CS First Stage (Rakuten) 2–0 | Koji Akiyama | Tadashi Settsu (ROY) | 2,245,969 | |
| 2010 | PL* | 1st^ | | 76 | 63 | 5 | .547 | — | | Lost CS Final Stage (Lotte) 4–3^{[e]} | Koji Akiyama | Tsuyoshi Wada (MVP) | 2,164,430 | |
| 2011^{†} | PL* | 1st^ | | 88 | 46 | 10 | .657 | — | | Won CS Final Stage (Seibu) 4–0^{[e]} Won Japan Series (Chunichi) 4–3 | Koji Akiyama | Koji Akiyama (MSA); Hiroki Kokubo (JS MVP); Seiichi Uchikawa (MVP) | 2,293,899 | |
| 2012 | PL | 3rd^ | | 67 | 65 | 12 | .508 | 6 1/2 | | Won CS First Stage (Seibu) 2–1; Lost CS Final Stage (Nippon-Ham) 4–0^{[e]} | Koji Akiyama | Tadashi Settsu (ESA) | 2,447,501 | |
| 2013 | PL | 4th | | 73 | 69 | 2 | .514 | 9 1/2 | | | Koji Akiyama | | 2,408,993 | |
| 2014^{†} | PL* | 1st^ | | 78 | 60 | 6 | .565 | — | | Won CS Final Stage (Nippon-Ham) 4–3^{[e]} Won Japan Series (Hanshin) 4–1 | Koji Akiyama | Koji Akiyama (MSA); Seiichi Uchikawa (JS MVP) | 2,468,442 | |
| 2015^{†} | PL* | 1st^ | | 90 | 49 | 4 | .647 | — | | Won CS Final Stage (Lotte) 4–0^{[e]} Won Japan Series (Yakult) 4–1 | Kimiyasu Kudo | Kimiyasu Kudo (MSA); Dae-ho Lee (JS MVP); Yuki Yanagita (MVP) | 2,535,877 | |
| 2016 | PL | 2nd^ | | 83 | 54 | 6 | .606 | 2 1/2 | | Won CS First Stage (Lotte) 2–0; Lost CS Final Stage (Nippon-Ham) 4–2^{[e]} | Kimiyasu Kudo | | 2,492,983 | |
| 2017^{†} | PL* | 1st^ | | 94 | 49 | 0 | .657 | — | | Won CS Final Stage (Rakuten) 4–2^{[e]} Won Japan Series (DeNA) 4–2 | Kimiyasu Kudo | Dennis Sarfate (JS MVP, MSA, MVP) | 2,526,792 | |
| 2018^{†} | PL | 2nd^ | | 82 | 60 | 1 | .577 | 6 1/2 | | Won CS First Stage (Nippon-Ham) 2–1; Won CS Final Stage (Seibu) 4–2^{[e]} Won Japan Series (Hiroshima) 4–1–1 | Kimiyasu Kudo | Takuya Kai (JS MVP); Kimiyasu Kudo (MSA) | 2,566,554 | |
| 2019^{†} | PL | 2nd^ | | 76 | 62 | 5 | .551 | 2 | | Won CS First Stage (Rakuten) 2–1; Won CS Final Stage (Seibu) 4–1^{[e]} Won Japan Series (Yomiuri) 4–0 | Kimiyasu Kudo | Yurisbel Gracial (JS MVP); Kimiyasu Kudo (MSA); Rei Takahashi (ROY) | 2,656,182 | |
| 2020^{†} | PL* | 1st^ | | 73 | 42 | 5 | .635 | — | | Won Climax Series^{[f]} (Lotte) 3–0^{[e]} Won Japan Series (Yomiuri) 4–0 | Kimiyasu Kudo | Kimiyasu Kudo (MSA); Ryoya Kurihara (JS MVP); Yuki Yanagita (MVP) | 532,723^{[g]} | |
| 2021 | PL | 4th | | 60 | 62 | 21 | .492 | 8 1/2 | | | Kimiyasu Kudo | | 462,060^{[g]} | |
| 2022 | PL | 2nd^ | | 76 | 65 | 2 | .539 | 0 | | Won CS First Stage (Seibu) 2–0; Lost CS Final Stage (Orix) 4–1^{[e]} | Hiroshi Fujimoto | | 2,247,898 | |
| 2023 | PL | 3rd^ | | 71 | 69 | 3 | .507 | 15 1/2 | | Lost CS First Stage (Lotte) 2–1 | Hiroshi Fujimoto | | 2,535,061 | |
| 2024 | PL* | 1st^ | | 91 | 49 | 3 | .650 | — | | Won CS Final Stage (Nippon-Ham) 4–0^{[e]} Lost Japan Series (DeNA) 4–2 | Hiroki Kokubo | Kensuke Kondoh (MVP) | 2,726,058 | |
| 2025^{†} | PL* | 1st^ | | 87 | 52 | 4 | .626 | — | | Won CS Final Stage (Nippon-Ham) 4–3^{[e]} Won Japan Series (Hanshin) 4–1 | Hiroki Kokubo | Hiroki Kokubo (MSA); Liván Moinelo (MVP); Hotaka Yamakawa (JS MVP) | 2,717,929 | |
| 2026 | PL* | 1st^ | | 91 | 49 | 3 | .650 | — | | Won CS Final Stage (Nippon-Ham) 5–0^{[e2]} Won 2026 Japan Series (DeNA) 4–0 | Hiroki Kokubo | | | |
| Total：88 seasons, 11,447 games | | | | 5,885 | 5,150 | 412 | .533 | Pennants：22, Championships：15 | | | | | | |

Statistics current through the 2026 season

== Notes ==
- ^{a} Games behind is determined by calculating the difference in wins plus the difference in losses divided by two.
- ^{b} Pacific League pitchers were not eligible to receive the Eiji Sawamura Award until 1989.
- ^{c} From 1973 to 1982, the Pacific League employed a split season format. Each season was divided into two halves and had their own winner. For sorting purposes, these seasons are sorted by the team's cumulative season performance unless the team won the PL playoff series and thus the league. In that case, the team is considered to be the first place winner of the league and is sorted as such.
- ^{d} The Pacific League did not report exact attendance figures until the 2005 season.
- ^{e} The final stage of the Climax Series awards the regular season champion an automatic one-win advantage.
- ^{e2} Starting from 2026 Season, if the regular season champion finished the season ten games better than the first-stage-winning team or if the first-stage-winning team finished the regular season with a record below .500, the series then changes to a best-of-seven (race-to-five) with the regular season champion given a two-game advantage.
- ^{f} Due to the COVID-19 pandemic, the Pacific League decided to modify the traditional Climax Series format and eliminate the first stage series to instead only play one modified final stage series.
- ^{g} Nippon Professional Baseball shortened the 2020 season because of the COVID-19 pandemic. Games that were played had their fan attendance either entirely prohibited or significantly limited. Attendance continued to be limited into the 2021 season.
