= 1952 Nippon Professional Baseball season =

1952 NPB season
- League: Nippon Professional Baseball
- Sport: Baseball

Central League pennant
- League champions: Yomiuri Giants
- Runners-up: Osaka Tigers
- Season MVP: Takehiko Bessho (YOM)

Pacific League pennant
- League champions: Nankai Hawks
- Runners-up: Mainichi Orions
- Season MVP: Susumu Yuki (NAN)

Japan Series
- Champions: Yomiuri Giants
- Runners-up: Nankai Hawks
- Finals MVP: Takehiko Bessho (YOM)

NPB seasons
- ← 1951 1953 →

The 1952 Nippon Professional Baseball season was the third season of operation of Nippon Professional Baseball (NPB).

== Regular season ==
=== Standings ===
Central League regular season standings
Team	G	W	L	T	Pct.	GB
Yomiuri Giants	120	83	37	0	.692	—
Osaka Tigers	120	79	40	1	.664	3.5
Nagoya Dragons	120	75	43	2	.636	7.0
Taiyo Whales	120	58	62	0	.483	25.0
Kokutetsu Swallows	120	50	70	0	.417	33.0
Hiroshima Carp	120	37	80	3	.316	44.5
Shochiku Robins	120	34	84	2	.288	48.0

Pacific League regular season standings
Team	G	W	L	T	Pct.	GB
Nankai Hawks	121	76	44	1	.633	—
Mainichi Orions	120	75	45	0	.625	1.0
Nishitetsu Lions	120	67	52	1	.563	8.5
Daiei Stars	121	55	65	1	.458	21.0
Hankyu Braves	108	49	58	1	.458	20.5
Tokyu Flyers	108	49	59	0	.454	21.0
Kintetsu Pearls	108	30	78	0	.278	40.0

== Postseason ==
=== Pacific League ===
For the first time, the Pacific League implemented a type of end-of-season playoff system. After the 108-game regular season, the four teams with the best winning percentages played an extra twelve regular season games to determine the league's champion. After the 108th game, the standings were:

Pos	Team	G	W	L	T	Pct.
1	Nankai Hawks	108	70	37	1	.653
2	Mainichi Orions	108	65	43	0	.602
3	Nishitetsu Lions	108	61	46	1	.569
4	Daiei Stars	108	52	55	1	.486
5	Hankyu Braves	108	49	58	1	.458
6	Tokyu Flyers	108	49	59	0	.454
7	Kintetsu Pearls	108	30	78	0	.278

The four qualifying teams were the Nankai Hawks, the Mainichi Orions, the Nishitetsu Lions, and the Daiei Stars. These four teams proceeded to play in a twelve game "round-robin" stage, with three games versus each opponent, in late September and early October. The results of this stage were:

Team	G	W	L	Pct.	vs. Mainichi	vs. Nishitetsu	vs. Nankai	vs. Daiei
Mainichi Orions	12	10	2	.833	—	3–1	3–1	4–0
Nishitetsu Lions	12	6	6	.500	1–3	—	2–2	3–1
Nankai Hawks	12	5	7	.417	1–3	2–2	—	2–2
Daiei Stars	12	3	9	.250	0–4	1–3	2–2	—

The Mainichi Orions' won ten of the twelve extra games, which put them into a tie for the first place with the Nankai Hawks. Both teams had 75 wins, however the Hawks had one less loss than the Orions because of a game against the Daiei Stars that ended in a tie earlier in the season. Because of the impact the tie had on the pennant race, the Hawks and the Stars played an extra 121st game. The Hawks won the game, giving them sole claim to Pacific League title. After the season, this faux playoff system was scrapped because of criticism that it was unfair to the three non-qualifying teams that had their seasons truncated.

=== Japan Series ===
CL Yomiuri Giants (4) vs. PL Nankai Hawks (2)

Game	Date	Score	Location	Time	Attendance
1	October 11	Nankai Hawks – 3, Yomiuri Giants – 6	Korakuen Stadium	1:57	23,794
2	October 12	Nankai Hawks – 0, Yomiuri Giants – 11	Korakuen Stadium	1:56	26,799
3	October 14	Yomiuri Giants – 0, Nankai Hawks – 4	Osaka Stadium	2:12	23,744
4	October 15	Yomiuri Giants – 6, Nankai Hawks – 2	Osaka Stadium	2:04	20,117
5	October 16	Yomiuri Giants – 1, Nankai Hawks – 4	Osaka Stadium	1:35	15,297
6	October 18	Nankai Hawks – 2, Yomiuri Giants – 3	Korakuen Stadium	2:02	34,595

== League leaders ==
=== Central League ===
Batting leaders
Stat	Player	Team	Total
Batting average	Michio Nishizawa	Nagoya Dragons	.353
Home runs	Satoshi Sugiyama	Nagoya Dragons	27
Runs batted in	Michio Nishizawa	Nagoya Dragons	98
Runs	Wally Yonamine	Yomiuri Giants	104
Hits	Wally Yonamine	Yomiuri Giants	163
Stolen bases	Jiro Kanayama	Shochiku Robins	63

Pitching leaders
Stat	Player	Team	Total
Wins	Takehiko Bessho	Yomiuri Giants	33
Losses	Tsuneo Kobayashi	Shochiku Robins	27
Earned run average	Tadayoshi Kajioka	Osaka Tigers	1.71
Strikeouts	Masaichi Kaneda	Kokutetsu Swallows	269
Innings pitched	Takehiko Bessho	Yomiuri Giants	371 1/3

=== Pacific League ===
Batting leaders
Stat	Player	Team	Total
Batting average	Shigeya Iijima	Daiei Stars	.336
Home runs	Yasuhiro Fukami	Nishitetsu Lions, Tokyu Flyers	25
Runs batted in	Tokuji Iida	Nankai Hawks	86
Runs	Tokuji Iida	Nankai Hawks	100
Hits	Tokuji Iida	Nankai Hawks	153
Stolen bases	Chusuke Kizuka	Nankai Hawks	55

Pitching leaders
Stat	Player	Team	Total
Wins	Masaaki Noguchi	Nishitetsu Lions	23
Losses	Mitsuro Sawafuji	Kintetsu Pearls	22
Earned run average	Susumu Yuki	Nankai Hawks	1.91
Strikeouts	Susumu Yuki	Nankai Hawks	104
Innings pitched	Giichi Hayashi	Daiei Stars	269 2/3

== Awards ==
- Most Valuable Player
  - Takehiko Bessho, Yomiuri Giants (CL)
  - Susumu Yuki, Nankai Hawks (PL)
- Rookie of the Year
  - Takao Sato, Kokutetsu Swallows (CL)
  - Futoshi Nakanishi, Nishitetsu Lions (PL)
- Eiji Sawamura Award
  - Shigeru Sugishita, Nagoya Dragons (CL)

Central League Best Nine Award winners
Position	Player	Team
Pitcher	Takehiko Bessho	Yomiuri Giants
Catcher	Akira Noguchi	Nagoya Dragons
First baseman	Michio Nishizawa	Nagoya Dragons
Second baseman	Shigeru Chiba	Yomiuri Giants
Third baseman	Fumio Fujimura	Osaka Tigers
Shortstop	Masaaki Hirai	Yomiuri Giants
Outfielder	Wally Yonamine	Yomiuri Giants
Outfielder	Satoshi Sugiyama	Nagoya Dragons
Outfielder	Fukashi Minamimura	Yomiuri Giants

Pacific League Best Nine Award winners
Position	Player	Team
Pitcher	Susumu Yuki	Nankai Hawks
Catcher	Takeshi Doigaki	Mainichi Orions
First baseman	Tokuji Iida	Nankai Hawks
Second baseman	Isami Okamoto	Nankai Hawks
Third baseman	Kazuo Kageyama	Nankai Hawks
Shortstop	Chusuke Kizuka	Nankai Hawks
Outfielder	Kaoru Betto	Mainichi Orions
Outfielder	Hiroshi Oshita	Tokyu Flyers
Outfielder	Shigeya Iijima	Daiei Stars

== See also ==
- 1952 All-American Girls Professional Baseball League season
- 1952 Major League Baseball season
