= 1955 Nippon Professional Baseball season =

1955 NPB season
- League: Nippon Professional Baseball
- Sport: Baseball

Central League pennant
- League champions: Yomiuri Giants
- Runners-up: Osaka Tigers
- Season MVP: Tetsuharu Kawakami (YOM)

Pacific League pennant
- League champions: Nankai Hawks
- Runners-up: Nishitetsu Lions
- Season MVP: Tokuji Iida (NAN)

Japan Series
- Champions: Yomiuri Giants
- Runners-up: Nankai Hawks
- Finals MVP: Takehiko Bessho (YOM)

NPB seasons
- ← 1954 1956 →

The 1955 Nippon Professional Baseball season was the sixth season of operation of Nippon Professional Baseball (NPB). This season featured the worst statistical season by winning percentage in NPB history, a .231 winning percentage set by the Taiyo Whales. This season also saw the most wins in a single season by a single team in NPB history, with the Nankai Hawks winning a record 99 games.

The Yomiuri Giants defeated the Nankai Hawks in the Japan Series, 4 games to 3, marking the Giants' 4th NPB championship, all of which to this point had come against the Hawks.

== Regular season ==
=== Standings ===
Central League regular season standings
Team	G	W	L	T	Pct.	GB
Yomiuri Giants	130	92	37	1	.713	—
Osaka Tigers	130	77	52	1	.597	15.0
Chunichi Dragons	130	71	57	2	.555	20.5
Hiroshima Carp	130	58	70	2	.453	33.5
Kokutetsu Swallows	130	57	71	2	.445	34.5
Taiyo Whales	130	31	99	0	.238	61.5

Pacific League regular season standings
Team	G	W	L	T	Pct.	GB
Nankai Hawks	143	99	41	3	.707	—
Nishitetsu Lions	144	90	50	4	.643	9.0
Mainichi Orions	142	85	55	2	.607	14.0
Hankyu Braves	142	80	60	2	.571	19.0
Kintetsu Pearls	142	60	80	2	.429	39.0
Daiei Stars	141	53	87	1	.379	46.0
Toei Flyers	143	51	89	3	.364	48.0
Tombo Unions	141	42	98	1	.300	57.0

== Postseason ==
=== Japan Series ===
CL Yomiuri Giants (4) vs. PL Nankai Hawks (3)

Game	Date	Score	Location	Time	Attendance
1	October 15	Yomiuri Giants – 4, Nankai Hawks – 1	Osaka Stadium	2:32	22,448
2	October 16	Yomiuri Giants – 0, Nankai Hawks – 2	Osaka Stadium	2:02	27,784
3	October 18	Nankai Hawks – 2, Yomiuri Giants – 0	Korakuen Stadium	2:02	17,324
4	October 21	Nankai Hawks – 5, Yomiuri Giants – 2	Korakuen Stadium	2:06	19,373
5	October 22	Nankai Hawks – 5, Yomiuri Giants – 9	Korakuen Stadium	2:38	17,320
6	October 23	Yomiuri Giants – 3, Nankai Hawks – 1	Osaka Stadium	2:11	22,695
7	October 24	Yomiuri Giants – 4, Nankai Hawks – 0	Osaka Stadium	2:11	17,775

== League leaders ==
=== Central League ===
Batting leaders
Stat	Player	Team	Total
Batting average	Tetsuharu Kawakami	Yomiuri Giants	.338
Home runs	Yukihiko Machida	Kokutetsu Swallows	31
Runs batted in	Tetsuharu Kawakami	Yomiuri Giants	78
Runs	Takao Sato	Kokutetsu Swallows	77
Hits	Tetsuharu Kawakami; Yoshio Yoshida	Yomiuri Giants; Osaka Tigers	147
Stolen bases	Itsuro Honda	Chunichi Dragons	42

Pitching leaders
Stat	Player	Team	Total
Wins	Ryohei Hasegawa; Takumi Otomo	Hiroshima Carp; Yomiuri Giants	30
Losses	Masatoshi Gondo	Taiyo Whales	21
Earned run average	Takehiko Bessho	Yomiuri Giants	1.33
Strikeouts	Masaichi Kaneda	Kokutetsu Swallows	350
Innings pitched	Masaichi Kaneda	Kokutetsu Swallows	400

=== Pacific League ===
Batting leaders
Stat	Player	Team	Total
Batting average	Futoshi Nakanishi	Nishitetsu Lions	.332
Home runs	Futoshi Nakanishi	Nishitetsu Lions	35
Runs batted in	Kazuhiro Yamauchi	Mainichi Orions	99
Runs	Chico Barbon	Hankyu Braves	105
Hits	Tokuji Iida; Chico Barbon	Nankai Hawks; Hankyu Braves	163
Stolen bases	Masao Morishita	Nankai Hawks	59

Pitching leaders
Stat	Player	Team	Total
Wins	Motoji Takuwa	Nankai Hawks	24
Losses	Yasuo Yonekawa	Toei Flyers	21
Earned run average	Takashi Nakagawa	Mainichi Orions	2.08
Strikeouts	Hisafumi Kawamura	Nishitetsu Lions	225
Innings pitched	Yasuo Yonekawa	Toei Flyers	353 1/3

== Awards ==
- Most Valuable Player
  - Tetsuharu Kawakami, Yomiuri Giants (CL)
  - Tokuji Iida, Nankai Hawks (PL)
- Rookie of the Year
  - Kazunori Nishimura, Osaka Tigers (CL)
  - Kihachi Enomoto, Mainichi Orions (PL)
- Eiji Sawamura Award
  - Takehiko Bessho, Yomiuri Giants (CL)

Central League Best Nine Award winners
Position	Player	Team
Pitcher	Takehiko Bessho	Yomiuri Giants
Catcher	Jun Hirota	Yomiuri Giants
First baseman	Tetsuharu Kawakami	Yomiuri Giants
Second baseman	Noboru Inoue	Chunichi Dragons
Third baseman	Toshikazu Kodama	Chunichi Dragons
Shortstop	Yoshio Yoshida	Osaka Tigers
Outfielder	Hiroyuki Watanabe	Osaka Tigers
Outfielder	Wally Yonamine	Yomiuri Giants
Outfielder	Yukihiko Machida	Kokutetsu Swallows

Pacific League Best Nine Award winners
Position	Player	Team
Pitcher	Taisei Nakamura	Nankai Hawks
Catcher	Charlie Lewis	Mainichi Orions
First baseman	Kohei Sugiyama	Nankai Hawks
Second baseman	Isami Okamoto	Nankai Hawks
Third baseman	Futoshi Nakanishi	Nishitetsu Lions
Shortstop	Chusuke Kizuka	Nankai Hawks
Outfielder	Kazuhiro Yamauchi	Mainichi Orions
Outfielder	Tokuji Iida	Nankai Hawks
Outfielder	Katsuki Tokura	Hankyu Braves

== See also ==
- 1955 Major League Baseball season
