= 1951 Nippon Professional Baseball season =

1951 NPB season
- League: Nippon Professional Baseball
- Sport: Baseball

Central League pennant
- League champions: Yomiuri Giants
- Runners-up: Nagoya Dragons
- Season MVP: Tetsuharu Kawakami (YOM)

Pacific League pennant
- League champions: Nankai Hawks
- Runners-up: Nishitetsu Lions
- Season MVP: Kazuto Yamamoto (NAN)

Japan Series
- Champions: Yomiuri Giants
- Runners-up: Nankai Hawks
- Finals MVP: Fukashi Minamimura (YOM)

NPB seasons
- ← 1950 1952 →

The 1951 Nippon Professional Baseball season was the second season of operation of Nippon Professional Baseball (NPB). 1951 saw the best season in terms of winning percentage in NPB history, with the Nankai Hawks going 72-24-8, good enough for a .750 winning percentage, on their way to their first Japan Series appearance in franchise history. The Yomiuri Giants would defeat the Nankai Hawks in the Japan Series 4 games to 1, marking the first of 22 Japan Series championships for the Giants.

== Regular season ==
=== Standings ===
Central League regular season standings
| Team | G | W | L | T | Pct. | GB |
|---|---|---|---|---|---|---|
| Yomiuri Giants | 114 | 79 | 29 | 6 | .731 | — |
| Nagoya Dragons | 113 | 62 | 48 | 3 | .564 | 18.0 |
| Osaka Tigers | 116 | 61 | 52 | 3 | .540 | 20.5 |
| Shochiku Robins | 115 | 53 | 57 | 5 | .482 | 27.0 |
| Kokutetsu Swallows | 107 | 46 | 59 | 2 | .438 | 31.5 |
| Taiyo Whales | 108 | 40 | 64 | 4 | .385 | 37.0 |
| Hiroshima Carp | 99 | 32 | 64 | 3 | .333 | 41.0 |

Pacific League regular season standings
| Team | G | W | L | T | Pct. | GB |
|---|---|---|---|---|---|---|
| Nankai Hawks | 104 | 72 | 24 | 8 | .750 | — |
| Nishitetsu Lions | 105 | 53 | 42 | 10 | .558 | 18.5 |
| Mainichi Orions | 110 | 54 | 51 | 5 | .514 | 22.5 |
| Daiei Stars | 101 | 41 | 52 | 8 | .441 | 29.5 |
| Hankyu Braves | 96 | 37 | 51 | 8 | .420 | 31.0 |
| Tokyu Flyers | 102 | 38 | 56 | 8 | .404 | 33.0 |
| Kintetsu Pearls | 98 | 37 | 56 | 5 | .398 | 33.5 |

== Postseason ==
=== Japan Series ===
CL Yomiuri Giants (4) vs. PL Nankai Hawks (1)

| Game | Date | Score | Location | Time | Attendance |
|---|---|---|---|---|---|
| 1 | October 10 | Yomiuri Giants – 5, Nankai Hawks – 0 | Osaka Stadium | 2:22 | 29,074 |
| 2 | October 11 | Yomiuri Giants – 7, Nankai Hawks – 0 | Osaka Stadium | 1:57 | 27,639 |
| 3 | October 13 | Nankai Hawks – 1, Yomiuri Giants – 3 | Korakuen Stadium | 2:14 | 35,066 |
| 4 | October 16 | Nankai Hawks – 4, Yomiuri Giants – 3 | Korakuen Stadium | 2:13 | 31,936 |
| 5 | October 17 | Nankai Hawks – 2, Yomiuri Giants – 8 | Korakuen Stadium | 1:52 | 15,519 |

== League leaders ==
=== Central League ===
Batting leaders
| Stat | Player | Team | Total |
|---|---|---|---|
| Batting average | Tetsuharu Kawakami | Yomiuri Giants | .377 |
| Home runs | Noboru Aota | Yomiuri Giants | 32 |
| Runs batted in | Noboru Aota | Yomiuri Giants | 105 |
| Runs | Noboru Aota | Yomiuri Giants | 101 |
| Hits | Tsuguo Goto | Osaka Tigers | 155 |
| Stolen bases | Goro Tsuchiya | Kokutetsu Swallows | 52 |

Pitching leaders
| Stat | Player | Team | Total |
|---|---|---|---|
| Wins | Shigeru Sugishita | Nagoya Dragons | 28 |
| Losses | Masaichi Kaneda | Kokutetsu Swallows | 21 |
| Earned run average | Kiyoshi Matsuda | Yomiuri Giants | 2.01 |
| Strikeouts | Masaichi Kaneda | Kokutetsu Swallows | 233 |
| Innings pitched | Masaichi Kaneda | Kokutetsu Swallows | 350 |

=== Pacific League ===
Batting leaders
| Stat | Player | Team | Total |
|---|---|---|---|
| Batting average | Hiroshi Oshita | Tokyu Flyers | .383 |
| Home runs | Hiroshi Oshita | Tokyu Flyers | 26 |
| Runs batted in | Tokuji Iida | Nankai Hawks | 87 |
| Runs | Kazuo Yamamoto | Nankai Hawks | 97 |
| Hits | Chusuke Kizuka | Nankai Hawks | 130 |
| Stolen bases | Chusuke Kizuka | Nankai Hawks | 55 |

Pitching leaders
| Stat | Player | Team | Total |
|---|---|---|---|
| Wins | Tadashi Eto | Nankai Hawks | 24 |
| Losses | Mitsuro Sawafuji | Kintetsu Pearls | 16 |
| Earned run average | Takeo Hattori | Nankai Hawks | 2.03 |
| Strikeouts | Hachiro Abe | Hankyu Braves | 150 |
| Innings pitched | Yasuo Yonekawa | Tokyu Flyers | 294 2/3 |

== Awards ==
- Most Valuable Player
  - Tetsuharu Kawakami, Yomiuri Giants (CL)
  - Kazuto Yamamoto, Nankai Hawks (PL)
- Rookie of the Year
  - Kiyoshi Matsuda, Yomiuri Giants (CL)
  - Kazuo Kageyama, Nankai Hawks (PL)
- Eiji Sawamura Award
  - Shigeru Sugishita, Nagoya Dragons (CL)

Central League Best Nine Award winners
| Position | Player | Team |
|---|---|---|
| Pitcher | Takehiko Bessho | Yomiuri Giants |
| Catcher | Akira Noguchi | Nagoya Dragons |
| First baseman | Tetsuharu Kawakami | Yomiuri Giants |
| Second baseman | Shigeru Chiba | Yomiuri Giants |
| Third baseman | Fumio Fujimura | Osaka Tigers |
| Shortstop | Masaaki Hirai | Yomiuri Giants |
| Outfielder | Masayasu Kaneda | Osaka Tigers |
| Outfielder | Noboru Aota | Yomiuri Giants |
| Outfielder | Yoshiyuki Iwamoto | Shochiku Robins |

Pacific League Best Nine Award winners
| Position | Player | Team |
|---|---|---|
| Pitcher | Tadashi Eto | Nankai Hawks |
| Catcher | Takeshi Doigaki | Mainichi Orions |
| First baseman | Tokuji Iida | Nankai Hawks |
| Second baseman | Kazuto Yamamoto | Nankai Hawks |
| Third baseman | Kazuo Kageyama | Nankai Hawks |
| Shortstop | Chusuke Kizuka | Nankai Hawks |
| Outfielder | Kaoru Betto | Mainichi Orions |
| Outfielder | Hiroshi Oshita | Tokyu Flyers |
| Outfielder | Shigeya Iijima | Daiei Stars |

== See also ==
- 1951 All-American Girls Professional Baseball League season
- 1951 Major League Baseball season
