= Nishi Nippon Pirates =

Nishi Nippon Pirates / Nishinippon Pirates
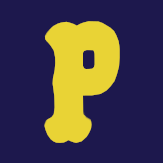
- Cap insignia

Information
- League: Nippon Professional Baseball Central League (1950)
- Location: Chūō-ku, Fukuoka, Fukuoka, Japan
- Ballpark: Heiwadai Stadium
- Founded: 1949
- Folded: 1951 (merged with the Nishitetsu Clippers)
- Colors: White, Navy, Yellow
- Ownership: Nishinippon Shimbun
- Manager: Toshio Kojima

The Nishi Nippon Pirates (西日本パイレーツ, Nishi-Nippon Pairētsu) or Nishinippon Pirates were a former Nippon Professional Baseball team and a founding member of the Central League in 1950. The team was owned by the Nishinippon Shimbun and played their home games in Heiwadai Stadium in Fukuoka. After only one season in which they fell victim to the first perfect game in professional Japanese baseball history, had financial and managerial problems, and finished in sixth place, the Pirates merged with the other Fukuoka-based Nishitetsu Clippers to form the Nishitetsu Lions in the Pacific League.

== History ==
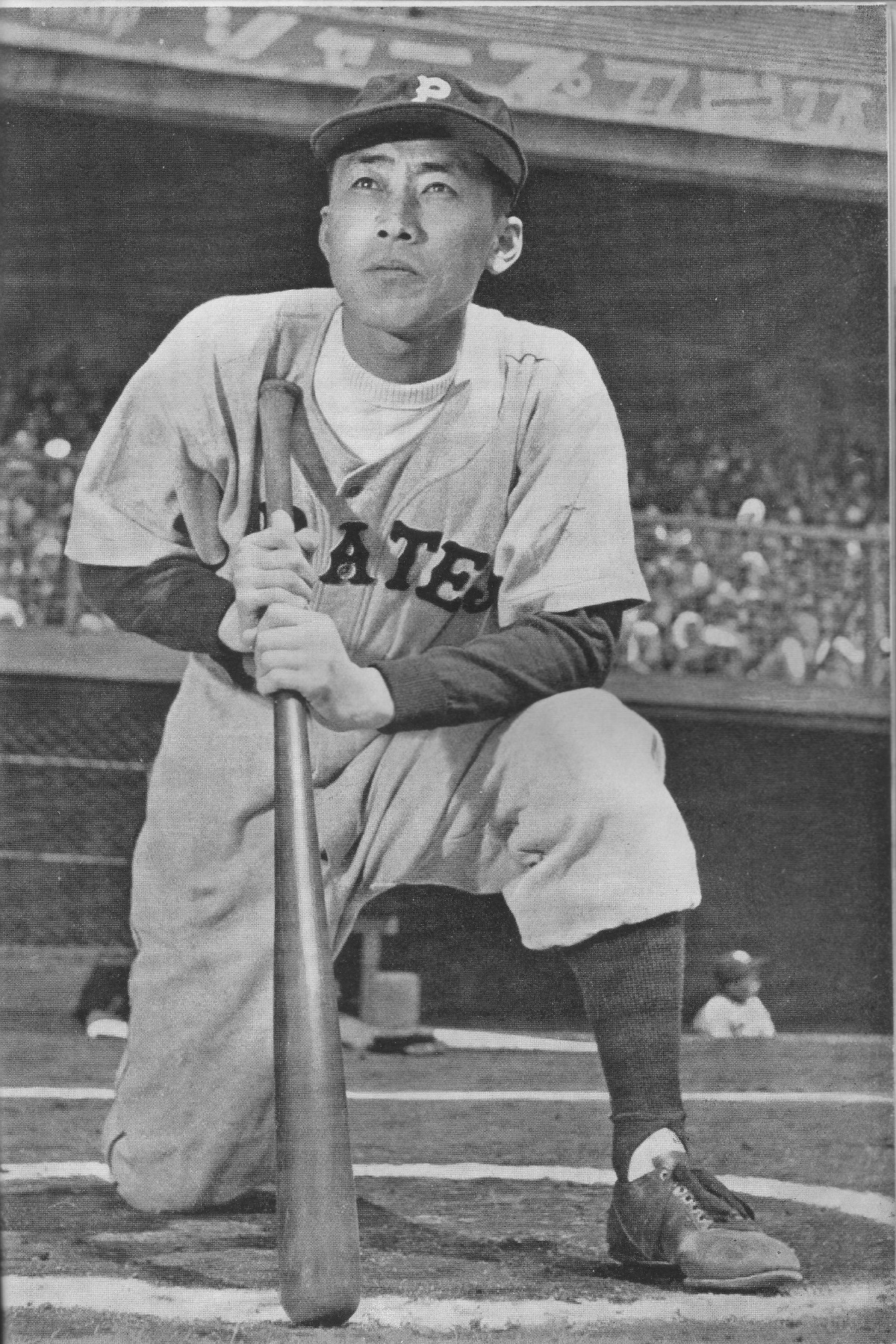
Yuko Minamimura played in Pirates' only season.

During the Japanese Baseball League's (JBL) 1949–50 offseason, the Fukuoka-based Nishinippon Shimbun and Nishitetsu Railroad, newspaper and railroad companies, respectively, planned to jointly create a professional baseball team. The plan broke down, however, when the JBL decided to reorganize and split into the Central (CL) and Pacific Leagues (PL) before the 1950 season. After the split, the Yomiuri Shimbun, the newspaper company that owned the CL's Yomiuri Giants, persuaded Nishinippon to form their own Central League team and the Nishi Nippon Pirates were formed on September 19, 1949, with the newly-built Heiwadai Stadium in Fukuoka acting as the team's home field. Nishitetsu went ahead and also created its own team, the Nishitetsu Clippers, in the Pacific League in November.

On June 28, 1950, in a game against the Giants, the Pirates were on the losing side of Hideo Fujimoto's perfect game, the first in professional Japanese baseball history. Because of ownership's inexperience in operating a sports team, management was unstable and they soon faced financial difficulties. By August, players' salaries began getting delayed soon went unpaid. Nishitetsu, realizing that Shimbun's management of the team was failing, proposed a merger and officially agreed to it in September. The team finished the season sixth out of eighth in the Central League. However, because of the large talent discrepancy between the top and bottom teams, the Pirates' record was 50–83–3 and they finished 48 games behind the first-place Shochiku Robins.

After the season, the team fought a proposal by Yomiuri to merge the Taiyo Whales and the Hiroshima Carp and dissolve the Pirates to create a six-team Central League. At a meeting of CL team representatives on January 10, 1951, the league realignment proposal was postponed. A week later, the Pirates announced former Giants' manager Osamu Mihara as the team's next manager. The initial aim of the teams' merger plan was to play in the Central League, where they could continue to play against the popular Giants. However, this plan was complicated when the team hired Mihara and also tried to acquire Giants' hitter Noboru Aota, as the Giants and other CL teams found the attempt problematic. With the relationship with the other Central League teams in trouble, it was instead announced on January 30 that the Pirates' merger with the Clippers would result in the formation of a Pacific League team, the Nishitetsu Lions. Mihara would go on to manage the Lions starting with the 1951 season. After the merger, the Giants argued that the Central League had the rights to Nishi Nippon's players and Yuko Minamimura and Saburo Hirai would both play for Yomiuri the following season.

== Roster ==
In the one season that the Pirates existed, the team utilized 27 players and was managed by player-manager Toshio Kojima. No Pirates players or personnel received any awards that season, nor were any ever voted into the Japanese Baseball Hall of Fame.

1950 Nishi Nippon Pirates roster
Pitchers: 11 Toshiaki Ogata; 12 Shigeru Hayashi; 14 Michio Shigematsu; 15 Ikuzo Inaba; 16 Masanori Yabuta; 17 Kaoru Tamagawa; 17 Isao Kyuki; 18 Kiichiro Nomoto; 19 Kotaro Mori; 23 Katsuma Shimoo	Catchers: 26 Takeshi Hibino; 28 Mitsuo Okamoto; Infielders: 1 Yuko Minamimura; 2 Yasuhisa Kimura; 3 Taro Sakurai; 5 Eiji Tanaami; 6 Tadashi Suzuki; 8 Saburo Hirai; 9 Hatsuo Kiyohara; 22 Kazuhiko Teshirogi	Outfielders: 20 Hiroyoshi Tsukamoto; 21 Teruo Tabe; 22 Shigeru Nagano; 24 Kenichi Kayano; 25 Seiji Sekiguchi; 27 Yukichi Nagatoshi; 30 Toshio Kojima; Manager: 30 Toshio Kojima
