= 1952 Japan Series =

Team (Wins)	Managers	Season
Yomiuri Giants (4)	Shigeru Mizuhara	83–37 (.692), 3.5 GA
Nankai Hawks (2)	Kazuto Tsuruoka	76–44–1 (.633), 1 GA
- Dates: October 11–18
- MVP: Takehiko Bessho (YOM)

The 1952 Japan Series was the championship series of Nippon Professional Baseball (NPB) for the 1952 season. The third edition of the series, it was a best-of-seven playoff that matched the Pacific League champion Nankai Hawks against the Central League champion Yomiuri Giants. The Giants won their second consecutive championship in six games.

== Summary ==
CL Yomiuri Giants (4) vs. PL Nankai Hawks (2)

Game	Date	Score	Location	Time	Attendance
1	October 11	Nankai Hawks – 3, Yomiuri Giants – 6	Korakuen Stadium	1:57	23,794
2	October 12	Nankai Hawks – 0, Yomiuri Giants – 11	Korakuen Stadium	1:56	26,799
3	October 14	Yomiuri Giants – 0, Nankai Hawks – 4	Osaka Stadium	2:12	23,744
4	October 15	Yomiuri Giants – 6, Nankai Hawks – 2	Osaka Stadium	2:04	20,117
5	October 16	Yomiuri Giants – 1, Nankai Hawks – 4	Osaka Stadium	1:35	15,297
6	October 18	Nankai Hawks – 2, Yomiuri Giants – 3	Korakuen Stadium	2:02	34,595

== Matchups ==
=== Game 1 ===
Saturday, October 11, 1952 – 2:08 pm at Korakuen Stadium in Bunkyō, Tokyo

Team	1	2	3	4	5	6	7	8	9	R	H	E
Nankai	0	0	0	3	0	0	0	0	0	3	8	1
Yomiuri	0	1	2	3	0	0	0	0	X	6	12	0
WP: Takehiko Bessho (1–0) LP: Nobuo Nakatani (0–1); Home runs: NAN: Tokuji Iida (1); YOM: Tetsuharu Kawakami (1)

=== Game 2 ===
Sunday, October 12, 1952 – 2:01 pm at Korakuen Stadium in Bunkyō, Tokyo

Team	1	2	3	4	5	6	7	8	9	R	H	E
Nankai	0	0	0	0	0	0	0	0	0	0	4	0
Yomiuri	0	3	0	2	2	1	0	3	X	11	12	1
WP: Hideo Fujimoto (1–0) LP: Hiroshi Nakahara (0–1); Home runs: NAN: None; YOM: Hideo Fujimoto (1), Wally Yonamine (1)

=== Game 3 ===
Tuesday, October 14, 1952 – 2:03 pm at Osaka Stadium in Osaka, Osaka Prefecture

Team	1	2	3	4	5	6	7	8	9	R	H	E
Yomiuri	0	0	0	0	0	0	0	0	0	0	6	1
Nankai	2	0	0	0	0	0	0	2	X	4	9	1
WP: Susumi Yuki (1–0) LP: Takumi Ōtomo (0–1)

=== Game 4 ===
Wednesday, October 15, 1952 – 2:01 pm at Osaka Stadium in Osaka, Osaka Prefecture

Team	1	2	3	4	5	6	7	8	9	R	H	E
Yomiuri	0	0	0	1	0	2	0	3	0	6	12	1
Nankai	0	0	0	1	0	0	1	0	0	2	6	0
WP: Takehiko Bessho (2–0) LP: Takeo Hattori (0–1)

=== Game 5 ===
Thursday, October 16, 1952 – 2:02 pm at Osaka Stadium in Osaka, Osaka Prefecture

Team	1	2	3	4	5	6	7	8	9	R	H	E
Yomiuri	1	0	0	0	0	0	0	0	0	1	9	1
Nankai	1	0	3	0	0	0	0	0	X	4	8	0
WP: Haruyasu Etō (1–0) LP: Hideo Fujimoto (1–1)

=== Game 6 ===
Saturday, October 18, 1952 – 1:59 pm at Korakuen Stadium in Bunkyō, Tokyo

Team	1	2	3	4	5	6	7	8	9	R	H	E
Nankai	2	0	0	0	0	0	0	0	0	2	5	1
Yomiuri	0	0	0	0	2	1	0	0	X	3	7	0
WP: Takehiko Bessho (3–0) LP: Susumi Yuki (1–1); Home runs: NAN: Nobushige Morishita (1); YOM: None

== See also ==
- 1952 World Series
