= 1973 Japan Series =

Sports event

Team (Wins)	Managers	Season
Yomiuri Giants (4)	Tetsuharu Kawakami	66–60–4 (.524), ½ GA
Nankai Hawks (1)	Katsuya Nomura	68–58–4 (.540)
- Dates: October 27 – November 1
- MVP: Tsuneo Horiuchi (Yomiuri)
- FSA: Katsuya Nomura (Nankai)

The 1973 Japan Series was the championship series of Nippon Professional Baseball (NPB) for the 1973 season. The 24th edition of the Series, it was a best-of-seven playoff that matched the Central League champion Yomiuri Giants against the Pacific League champion Nankai Hawks. This was the first Japan Series held under a playoff system, albeit only on the Pacific League side, as they held a split-season that matched the first-half winner (Nankai Hawks) vs the 2nd half winner (Hankyu Braves) for a best-of-five playoff (in the event that a team won both halves, which happened twice when the system was in place from 1973 to 1982, they simply advanced to the Japan Series); Nankai defeated Hankyu in five games. Despite having their worst record to win a pennant in years, the Giants defeated the Hawks in five games to win an NPB-record ninth consecutive Japan Series title.

== Summary ==
Game	Score	Date	Location	Attendance
1	Hawks – 4, Giants – 3	October 27	Osaka Stadium	27,027
2	Hawks – 2, Giants – 3	October 28	Osaka Stadium	28,135
3	Giants – 8, Hawks – 2	October 30	Korakuen Stadium	34,713
4	Giants – 6, Dragons – 2	October 31	Korakuen Stadium	38,270
5	Giants – 5, Hawks – 1	November 1	Korakuen Stadium	37,761

== See also ==
- 1973 World Series
