= Wally Yonamine =

American multi-sport athlete (1925–2011)

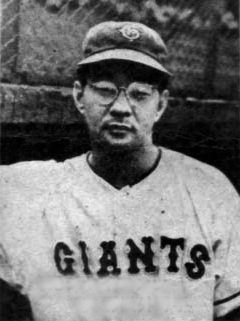
- Yonamine in 1951
- Outfielder
- Born: June 24, 1925; Olowalu, Hawaii Territory
- Died: February 28, 2011 (aged 85); Honolulu, Hawaii, U.S.

NPB debut
- June 19, 1951, for the Yomiuri Giants

Last appearance
- October 12, 1962, for the Chunichi Dragons

NPB statistics
- Batting average: .311
- Hits: 1,337
- Home runs: 82
- Runs batted in: 482
- Stats at Baseball Reference

Teams
- As player: Yomiuri Giants (1951–1960); Chunichi Dragons (1961–1962); As manager: Chunichi Dragons (1972–1977)

Career highlights and awards
- 4× Japan Series champion (1951, 1952, 1953, 1955); Central League MVP (1957); 8× NPB All-Star (1952–1959); 7× Best Nine Award (1952–1958)

Member of the Japanese

Baseball Hall of Fame
- Induction: 1994
- Football career
No. 94
- Position: Running back
Personal information
- Listed height: 5 ft 9 in (1.75 m)
- Listed weight: 180 lb (82 kg)
Career information
- High school: Farrington (Honolulu, Hawaii)
Career history
- San Francisco 49ers (1947)
Career statistics
- Rushing yards: 74
- Receiving yards: 40
- Touchdowns: 0
- Stats at Pro Football Reference

Wallace Kaname Yonamine (与那嶺要, Yonamine Kaname; June 24, 1925 – February 28, 2011) was a Japanese-American multi-sport athlete. He played 12 seasons of professional baseball in Japan's Nippon Professional Baseball with the Yomiuri Giants (1951–1960) and the Chunichi Dragons (1961–1962). He also played a single season of professional football with the San Francisco 49ers of the All-America Football Conference (AAFC).

== Early life ==
Kaname Yonamine, a Nisei Japanese American, was born in Olowalu, Maui, Hawaii to parents Matsusai (September 1, 1890 – July 31, 1988) and Kikue (February 14, 1901 – February 26, 1999). Matsusai was an uchinānchu immigrant and Kikue came from Hiroshima. Yonamine attended Lahainaluna and Wallace Rider Farrington High School. The name of his high school was the origin of his nickname, originally Wallace, but quickly changed to Wally, which would later become his legal name.

== Professional football career ==
Yonamine signed a $14,000 contract, playing running back for the San Francisco 49ers in their second season (1947). Doing so, he became the first football player of Japanese American ancestry to play professional football (Walter Achiu was the first Asian-American). In his one season with the team, he had 19 carries for 74 yards and caught 3 passes for 40 yards. His football career ended during the off-season, when he broke his wrist playing in an amateur baseball league in Hawaii.

== Professional baseball career ==
A multi-skilled outfielder, Yonamine was also noted for his flexible batting style and aggressive baserunning during his career with the Yomiuri Giants and Chunichi Dragons. In Japan, Yonamine was a member of four Japan Series Championship teams, the Central League MVP in 1957, a consecutive seven-time Best Nine Award winner (1952–58), an eleven-time All-Star, a three-time batting champion.

Yonamine was inducted into the Japanese Baseball Hall of Fame, admitted in 1994 for his achievements during his 12-year career with the Giants and Dragons.

== Post-career ==
Yonamine operated a highly successful pearl store, "Wally Yonamine Pearls", with his wife, Jane. The store is located in Roppongi, Tokyo. They also had a branch of their store in California run by their children. In 2008, Yonamine joined the Japanese Master League team Nagoya 80 D'sers as a coach/part-time player.

After an extended battle with prostate cancer, Yonamine died on February 28, 2011, aged 85, in Honolulu.

Yonamine's grand-nephew, Micah, was selected by the Philadelphia Phillies in the 29th round of the 2019 Major League Baseball draft. He is currently a developmental player for the Hokkaido Nippon-Ham Fighters.

== See also ==
- American expatriate baseball players in Japan
