= Akira Noguchi =

Japanese baseball player (1917–1996)

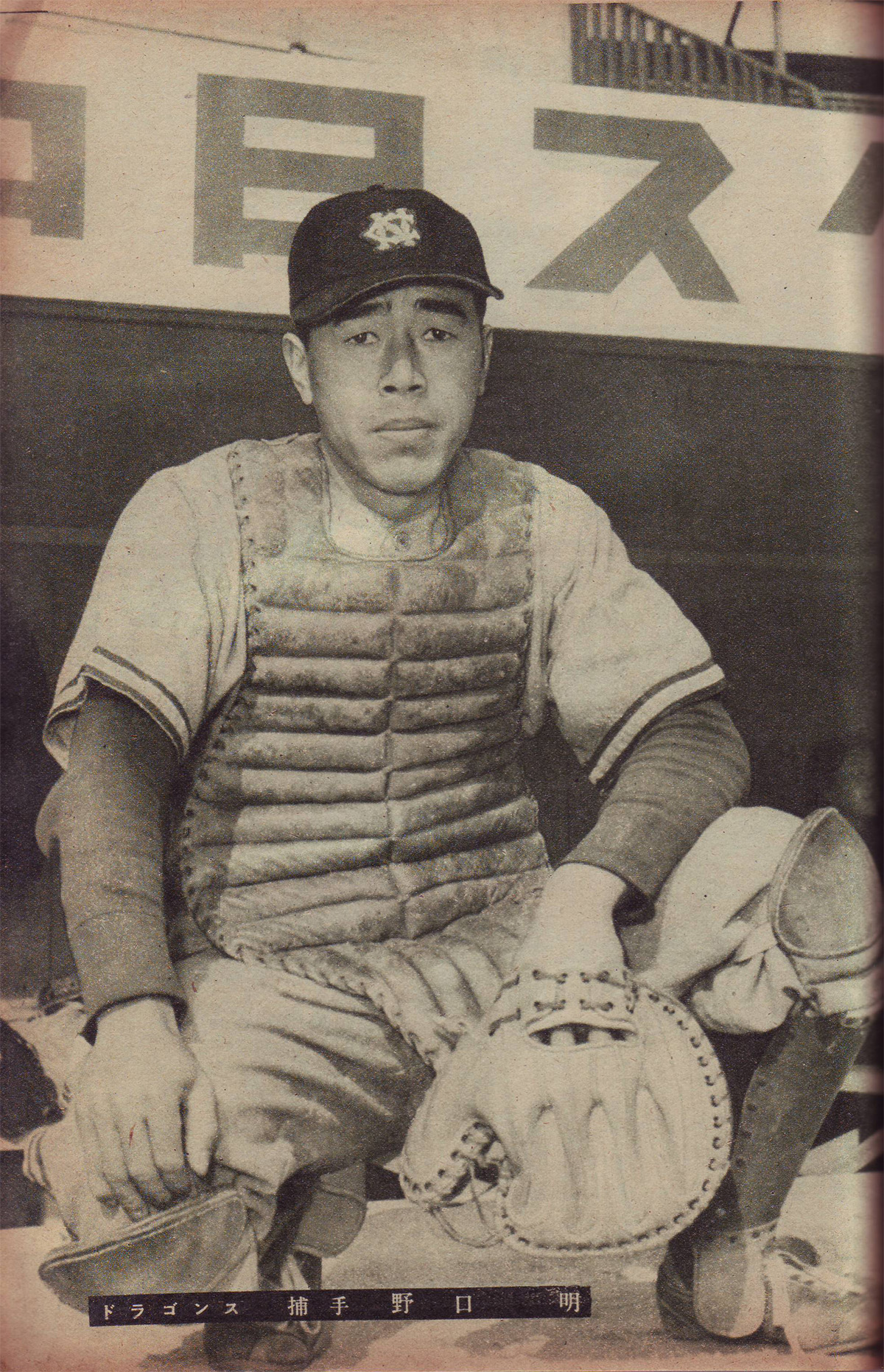
- Noguchi, photographed in 1950 in his Chunichi Dragons uniform and catcher's gear

Tokyo Senators – No. 18
- Catcher, First baseman, Pitcher, Manager
- Born: August 6, 1917; Nagoya, Aichi, Japan
- Died: October 5, 1996 (aged 79)
- Batted: Right Threw: Right

JBL debut
- Spring, 1936, for the Tokyo Senators

Last NPB appearance
- 1955, for the Chunichi Dragons

JBL/NPB career pitching statistics
- Wins-losses: 49–40
- Earned run average: 2.54
- Strikeouts: 328

JBL/NPB career hitting statistics
- Batting average: .251
- Home runs: 61
- Run batted in: 572

Teams
- As player: Tokyo Senators/Taiyō/Nishitetsu (1936–1937, 1942–1943); Hankyu Club/Hankyu Braves (1944, 1946–1948); Chunichi/Nagoya Dragons (1949–1955); As manager: Chunichi Dragons (1955–1956)

Career highlights and awards
- 30-game winner (1937); 4x All-Star (1951, 1952, 1953, 1954); 2x Best Nine Award-winner (1951, 1952); Japan Series champion (1954)

Akira Noguchi (野口明, Noguchi Akira) (August 6, 1917 – October 5, 1996) was a Japanese baseball pitcher, infielder, catcher, and manager who played 15 total seasons in the Japanese Baseball League and then Nippon Professional Baseball, during the period 1936 to 1955. The rare two-way player, Noguchi was particularly unusual in that he excelled in the specialized positions of both pitcher and catcher.

A four-time All-Star and a two-time Best Nine Award-winner, Noguchi was the eldest of four brothers who played professional baseball in Japan.

== Biography ==
Born in Nagoya, Aichi, Noguchi attended Chukyo Shogyo High School and Meiji University.

=== Senators/Taiyō/Nishitetsu ===
Noguchi began his professional career in 1936 with the Japanese Baseball League (JBL), as an 18-year-old with the Tokyo Senators. As a rookie, Noguchi went 15-13 with a 2.65 earned run average in 1936; following that with a combined 34–22 record in 1937, with a 2.21 ERA. (The 1936 and 1937 JBL seasons were split into spring and fall half-seasons.) His 1937 totals led the league in games pitched and innings; he started nearly 70% of his team's games, and his 34 wins represented 68% of the Senators combined victories for the year.

Noguchi wore uniform number 18 for the Senators, starting a trend where ace pitchers wore that number. Other notable Japanese pitchers who have worn number 18 since Akira Noguchi (even carrying the tradition over to Major League Baseball) include Tsuneo Horiuchi, Masumi Kuwata, Yu Darvish, Daisuke Matsuzaka, and Tsuyoshi Wada.

After excelling as a pitcher in 1936–1937, Noguchi left professional baseball for four seasons, during which his younger brother Jirō Noguchi took his place as the team's star pitcher. (Two other Noguchi brothers briefly played in the JBL: Noboru [b. 1922, d. 1945] with the Hanshin Baseball Club, and Wataru [b. 1926], who played for Kinki Nihon.)

Akira returned to the team in 1942–1943, joining Jirō. After his hiatus from baseball, Akira mostly left pitching behind, concentrating on hitting, initially as a first baseman and then in later years as a catcher. Altogether, Noguchi played four seasons with the Senators franchise, which, due to various pressures and changing ownership went through a number of name changes during his tenure: Tokyo Senators (1936–1937), Taiyō (1942), and finally Nishitetsu (1943).

=== Hankyu ===
Noguchi moved to the Hankyu Baseball Club in 1944, returning to the team (which soon became known as the Hankyu Braves) after World War II. There he was joined by Jirō, where the two brothers were teammates for three more seasons (making it five in all). As a member of the Braves in 1947, Akira became the first person in Japanese pro baseball to hit an inside-the-park grand slam.

=== Dragons ===
Leaving the Braves after the 1948 season, Akira joined the Chunichi Dragons, the franchise where he would have his greatest success, as a catcher. He played for the Dragons from 1949 to 1955, making four All-Star teams and being named to the Best Nine at catcher twice. His best year was 1950, when he hit .271 with a career-best 18 home runs and 73 RBI.

Immediately after his playing career ended, Noguchi was hired by Dragons as the team's manager. He guided the team to winning records in 1955 and 1956, and then retired from baseball.

=== Death ===
Noguchi died on October 5, 1996, at age 79.
