= 1951 Japan Series =

Team (Wins)	Managers	Season
Yomiuri Giants (4)	Shigeru Mizuhara	79–29–6 (.731), 18 GA
Nankai Hawks (1)	Kazuto Tsuruoka	72–24–8 (.750), 18.5 GA
- Dates: October 10–17
- MVP: Fukashi Minamimura (YOM)

The 1951 Japan Series was the championship series of Nippon Professional Baseball (NPB) for the 1951 season. The second edition of the Japan Series, it was a best-of-seven playoff that matched the Pacific League champion Nankai Hawks against the Central League champion Yomiuri Giants.

The Yomiuri Giants, who previously dominated the NPB predecessor Japanese Baseball League, won their first NPB championship in five games.

== Summary ==
CL Yomiuri Giants (4) vs. PL Nankai Hawks (1)

Game	Date	Score	Location	Time	Attendance
1	October 10	Yomiuri Giants – 5, Nankai Hawks – 0	Osaka Stadium	2:22	29,074
2	October 11	Yomiuri Giants – 7, Nankai Hawks – 0	Osaka Stadium	1:57	27,639
3	October 13	Nankai Hawks – 1, Yomiuri Giants – 3	Korakuen Stadium	2:14	35,066
4	October 16	Nankai Hawks – 4, Yomiuri Giants – 3	Korakuen Stadium	2:13	31,936
5	October 17	Nankai Hawks – 2, Yomiuri Giants – 8	Korakuen Stadium	1:52	15,519

== Matchups ==
=== Game 1 ===
Wednesday, October 10, 1951, 2:02pm (JST) at Osaka Stadium in Osaka, Osaka Prefecture
Team	1	2	3	4	5	6	7	8	9	R	H	E
Yomiuri	0	0	0	1	1	3	0	0	0	5	15	1
Nankai	0	0	0	0	0	0	0	0	0	0	10	0
WP: Hideo Fujimoto (1–0) LP: Tadashi Eto (0–1)

=== Game 2 ===
Thursday, October 11, 1951, 2:01pm (JST) at Osaka Stadium in Osaka, Osaka Prefecture
Team	1	2	3	4	5	6	7	8	9	R	H	E
Yomiuri	0	3	2	0	0	1	1	0	0	7	9	1
Nankai	0	0	0	0	0	0	0	0	0	0	6	1
WP: Takehiko Bessho (1–0) LP: Susumu Yuki (0–1); Home runs: YOM: Noboru Aota (1); NAN: None

=== Game 3 ===
Saturday, October 13, 1951, 2:00 pm (JST) at Korakuen Stadium in Bunkyo, Tokyo
Team	1	2	3	4	5	6	7	8	9	R	H	E
Nankai	0	0	0	0	0	0	1	0	0	1	5	1
Yomiuri	2	0	0	0	0	0	0	1	X	3	8	0
WP: Kiyoshi Matsuda (1–0) LP: Hiroshi Nakahara (0–1)

=== Game 4 ===
Tuesday, October 16, 1951, 2:00 pm (JST) at Korakuen Stadium in Bunkyo, Tokyo
Team	1	2	3	4	5	6	7	8	9	R	H	E
Nankai	0	0	4	0	0	0	0	0	0	4	9	0
Yomiuri	0	0	0	0	0	0	0	0	3	3	3	1
WP: Takeo Hattori (1–0) LP: Hiroshi Nakao (0–1); Home runs: NAN: None; YOM: Kazuo Higasa (1)

=== Game 5 ===
Wednesday, October 17, 1951, 2:03 pm (JST) at Korakuen Stadium in Bunkyo, Tokyo
Team	1	2	3	4	5	6	7	8	9	R	H	E
Nankai	0	0	0	0	0	0	0	0	2	2	6	0
Yomiuri	0	1	0	2	2	0	0	3	X	8	9	0
WP: Hideo Fujimoto (2–0) LP: Susumu Yuki (0–2); Home runs: NAN: Kazuharu Murakami (1); YOM: Mitsuo Uno (1), Shigeru Chiba (1), Tetsuharu Kawakami (1), Wally Yonamine (1)

Outfielder Yuko Minamimura, who batted .563 with nine hits and four RBIs, was named Series MVP.

== See also ==
- 1951 World Series
