= Yuko Minamimura =

Japanese baseball player and coach

Yuko Minamimura 南村 侑広
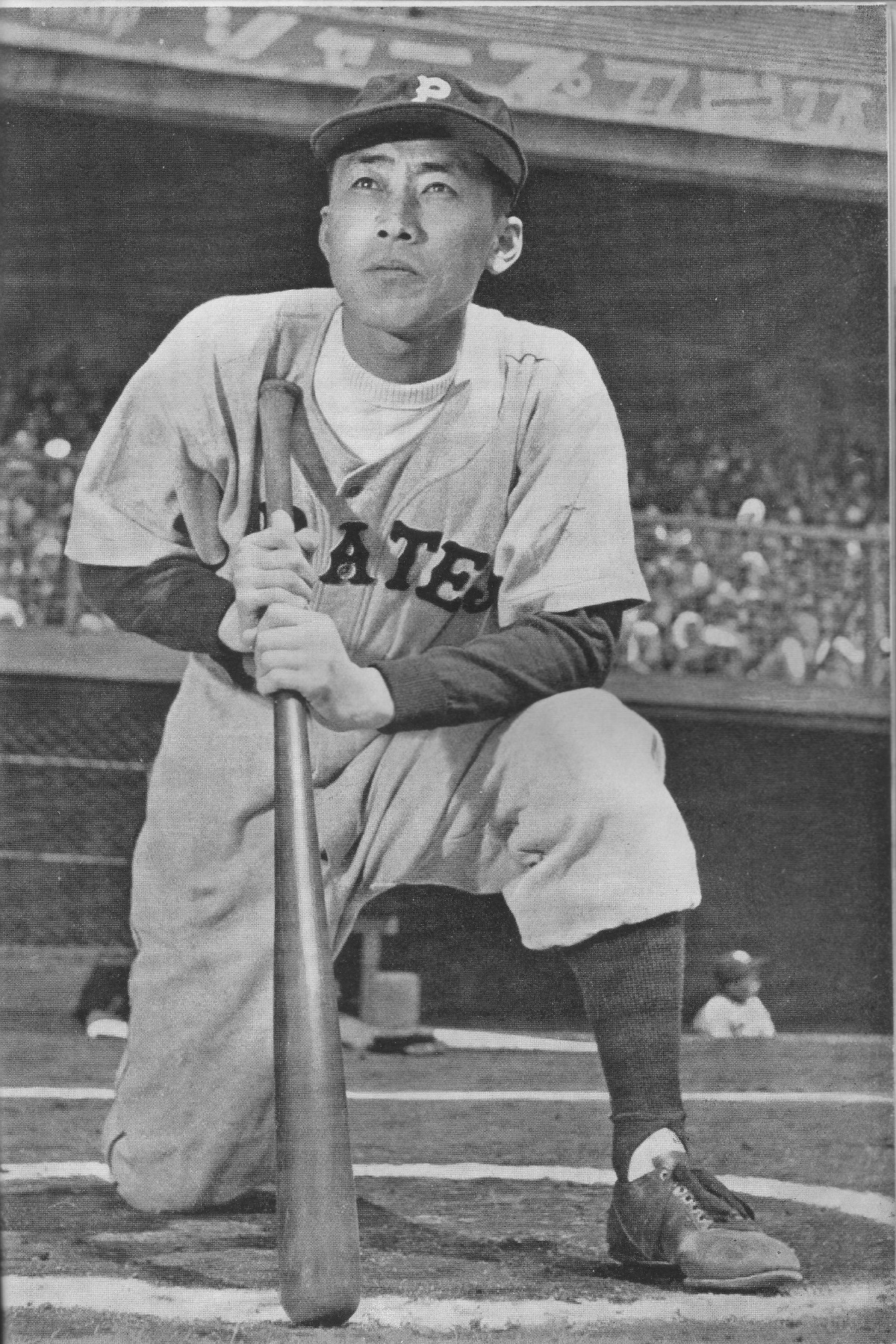
- Yuko Minamimura, 1950
- Outfielder
- Born: April 17, 1917; Osaka, Japan
- Died: April 17, 1990 (aged 73)
- Batted: Right Threw: Right

debut
- 1950, for the Nishi Nippon Pirates

Last appearance
- 1957, for the Yomiuri Giants

NPB statistics
- Batting average: .283
- hits: 740
- Runs batted in: 357
- Stats at Baseball Reference

Teams
- As player: Nishi Nippon Pirates (1950); Yomiuri Giants (1951–1957); As coach: Yomiuri Giants (1964–1967)

Career highlights and awards
- Japan Series Most Valuable Player Award (1951); 4x Japan Series champion (1951, 1952, 1953, 1955)

Yuko Minamimura (南村 侑広, Minamimura Yukō; born April 17, 1917 – April 17, 1990) was a Nippon Professional Baseball outfielder. He became a professional baseball player at the age of 33, doing so for the Nishi Nippon Pirates. When the Pirates fizzled out after one season of play, he shuffled over to the Yomiuri Giants. From 1950 to 1953 he went by the name of Fukashi Minamimura. In the 1951 Japan Series, he batted .563 with nine hits that drove in four runs to lead the Yomiuri Giants to their first Japan Series championship. Minamimura was named Series MVP for his efforts. He became a bench player in 1956 and retired after the following season. He played in 774 games in NPB and batted .283. He became a coach and a baseball commentator in his post-playing career.
