= Hirohiko Nakamura =

Japanese politician

- 中村 博彦
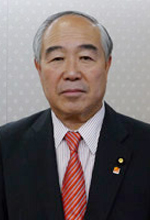
- Nakamura in 2008

Member of the House of Councillors
- In office 26 July 2004 – 31 July 2013
- Preceded by: Multi-member district
- Succeeded by: Tsuneo Horiuchi
- Constituency: National PR

Member of the Tokushima Prefectural Assembly
- In office 1987–1990

Personal details
- Born: 29 January 1943 Yoshinogawa, Tokushima, Japan
- Died: 31 July 2013 (aged 70) Nagoya, Aichi, Japan
- Party: Liberal Democratic
- Education: University of Tokushima

Hirohiko Nakamura (中村 博彦, Nakamura Hirohiko; January 29, 1943 – July 31, 2013) was a Japanese politician of the Liberal Democratic Party, a member of the House of Councillors in the Diet (national legislature). A native of Yoshinogawa, Tokushima and graduate of University of Tokushima, he was elected to the House of Councillors for the first time in 2004 and re-elected for a second term in 2010, both times running on the Liberal Democratic proportional list. He was parliamentary secretary for Internal Affairs and Communications during the realigned Fukuda and Asō cabinets from 2008 to 2009.
