= List of Yomiuri Giants broadcasters =

The Yomiuri Giants are a Japanese professional baseball team, based out of Tokyo. As Japan's first professional team, they are considered one of the most famous teams in the country. The following is a list of individuals and companies involved in the broadcasting of Yomiuri Giants games.

== Broadcasting companies ==
- TV: Nippon Television
- Radio: Radio Nippon in Tokyo

== Broadcast announcers ==
=== TV analyst ===
- Suguru Egawa
- Tsuneo Horiuchi
- Katsuhito Mizuno
- Kiyoshi Nakahata

=== TV play-by-play ===
- Satoshi Ebihara
- Genta Aoki
- Kentaro Hirakawa
- Satoshi Kamige
- Ryo Kawamura
- Hironori Machida
- Yoshihiko Murayama
- Yasushi Shinya
- Kenichiro Tanabe
