= 1955 Japan Series =

Team (Wins)	Managers	Season
Yomiuri Giants (4)	Shigeru Mizuhara	92–37–1 (.713), 15 GA
Nankai Hawks (3)	Kazuto Tsuruoka	99–41–3 (.707), 9 GA
- Dates: October 15–24
- MVP: Takehiko Bessho (Yomiuri)
- FSA: Ichirō Togawa (Nankai)

The 1955 Japan Series was the championship series of Nippon Professional Baseball (NPB) for the 1955 season. The sixth edition of the Series, it was a best-of-seven playoff that matched the Pacific League champion Nankai Hawks against the Central League champion Yomiuri Giants.

== Summary ==
CL Yomiuri Giants (4) vs. PL Nankai Hawks (3)

Game	Date	Score	Location	Time	Attendance
1	October 15	Yomiuri Giants – 4, Nankai Hawks – 1	Osaka Stadium	2:32	22,448
2	October 16	Yomiuri Giants – 0, Nankai Hawks – 2	Osaka Stadium	2:02	27,784
3	October 18	Nankai Hawks – 2, Yomiuri Giants – 0	Korakuen Stadium	2:02	17,324
4	October 21	Nankai Hawks – 5, Yomiuri Giants – 2	Korakuen Stadium	2:06	19,373
5	October 22	Nankai Hawks – 5, Yomiuri Giants – 9	Korakuen Stadium	2:38	17,320
6	October 23	Yomiuri Giants – 3, Nankai Hawks – 1	Osaka Stadium	2:11	22,695
7	October 24	Yomiuri Giants – 4, Nankai Hawks – 0	Osaka Stadium	2:11	17,775

== Matchups ==
=== Game 1 ===
Saturday, October 15, 1955 – 2:02 pm at Osaka Stadium in Osaka, Osaka Prefecture

Team	1	2	3	4	5	6	7	8	9	10	R	H	E
Yomiuri	0	0	0	1	0	0	0	0	0	3	4	13	0
Nankai	0	0	0	0	1	0	0	0	0	0	1	4	2
WP: Takehiko Bessho (1–0) LP: Motoji Takuwa (0–1); Home runs: YOM: Tetsuharu Kawakami (1); NAN: None

=== Game 2 ===
Sunday, October 16, 1955 – 2:00 pm at Osaka Stadium in Osaka, Osaka Prefecture

Team	1	2	3	4	5	6	7	8	9	R	H	E
Yomiuri	0	0	0	0	0	0	0	0	0	0	4	0
Nankai	0	1	0	0	0	0	1	0	X	2	4	0
WP: Masaharu Kobata (1–0) LP: Takumi Ōtomo (0–1); Home runs: YOM: None; NAN: Tokuji Iida (1)

=== Game 3 ===
Tuesday, October 18, 1955 – 2:03 pm at Korakuen Stadium in Bunkyō, Tokyo

Team	1	2	3	4	5	6	7	8	9	R	H	E
Nankai	0	0	0	1	0	0	0	1	0	2	7	0
Yomiuri	0	0	0	0	0	0	0	0	0	0	7	1
WP: Ichirō Togawa (1–0) LP: Hiroshi Nakao (0–1); Home runs: NAN: Isami Okamoto (1); YOM: None

=== Game 4 ===
Friday, October 21, 1955 – 2:00 pm at Korakuen Stadium in Bunkyō, Tokyo

Team	1	2	3	4	5	6	7	8	9	R	H	E
Nankai	1	0	0	0	0	0	0	4	0	5	8	0
Yomiuri	0	0	0	0	1	0	0	0	1	2	9	2
WP: Ichirō Togawa (2–0) LP: Takehiko Bessho (1–1)

=== Game 5 ===
Saturday, October 22, 1955 – 1:01 pm at Korakuen Stadium in Bunkyō, Tokyo

Team	1	2	3	4	5	6	7	8	9	R	H	E
Nankai	0	0	0	3	1	0	1	0	0	5	10	2
Yomiuri	4	0	0	1	0	0	4	0	X	9	11	0
WP: Takehiko Bessho (2–1) LP: Masaharu Kobata (1–1); Home runs: NAN: Tokuji Iida (2), Yasuhiro Fukami (1); YOM: Shigeru Fujio (1)

=== Game 6 ===
Sunday, October 23, 1955 – 2:00 pm at Osaka Stadium in Osaka, Osaka Prefecture

Team	1	2	3	4	5	6	7	8	9	R	H	E
Yomiuri	2	0	0	0	0	0	0	0	1	3	8	1
Nankai	1	0	0	0	0	0	0	0	0	1	4	1
WP: Hiroshi Nakao (1–1) LP: Taisei Nakamura (0–1)

=== Game 7 ===
Monday, October 24, 1955 – 2:00 pm at Osaka Stadium in Osaka, Osaka Prefecture

Team	1	2	3	4	5	6	7	8	9	R	H	E
Yomiuri	0	0	0	0	1	0	0	0	3	4	6	1
Nankai	0	0	0	0	0	0	0	0	0	0	4	1
WP: Takehiko Bessho (3–1) LP: Ichirō Togawa (2–1)

== See also ==
- 1955 World Series
