= Hideo Fujimoto =

Japanese baseball player (1918–1997)

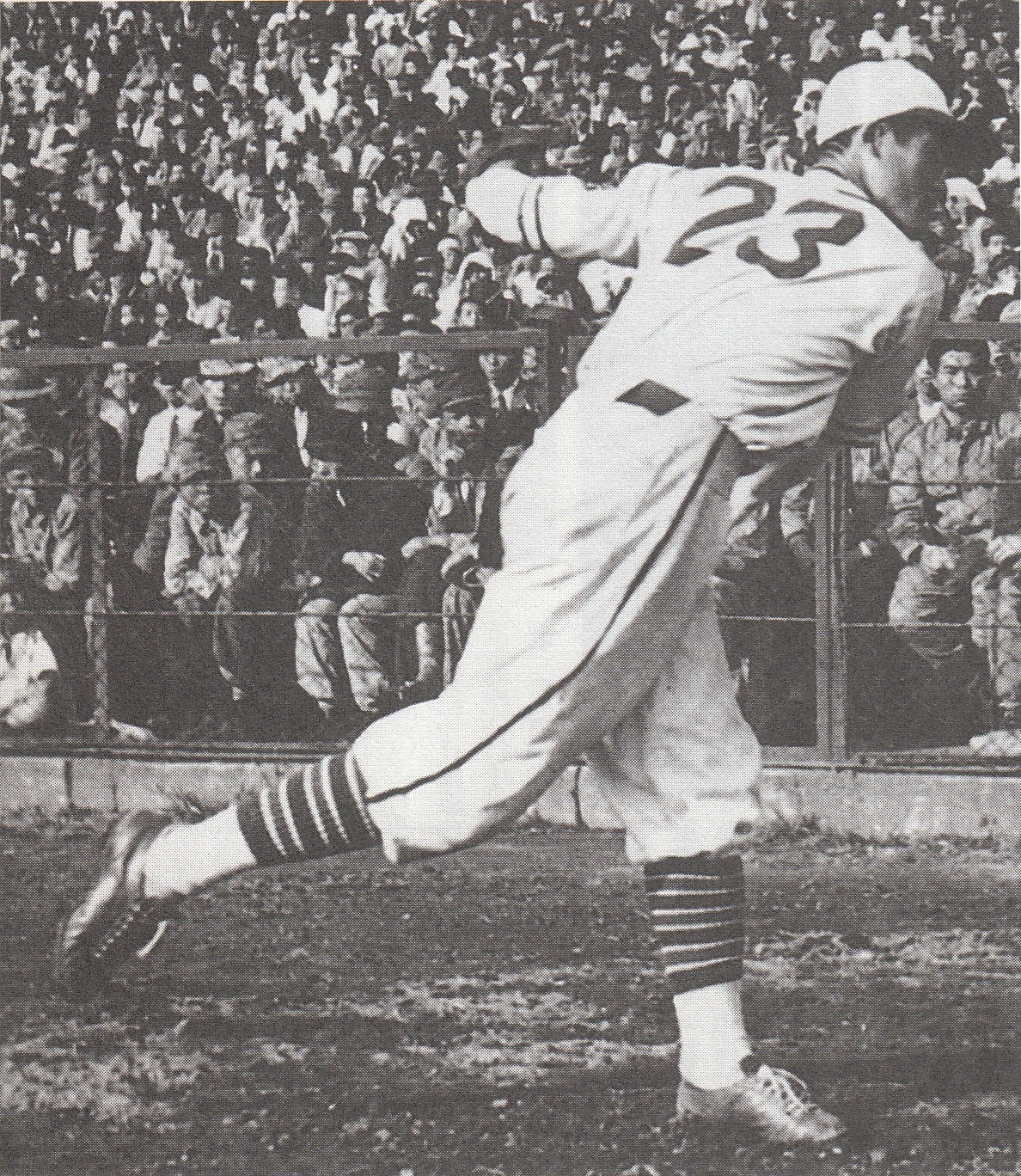
- Hideo Fujimoto

Yomiuri Giants – No. 23
- Pitcher, Outfielder
- Born: Lee Pal-yong; May 10, 1918; Busan, Korea
- Died: April 26, 1997 (aged 78); Japan
- Batted: Right Threw: Right

JBL debut
- 1942, for the Tokyo Kyojin

Last NPB appearance
- 1955, for the Yomiuri Giants

JBL/NPB career pitching statistics
- Win–loss: 200–87
- Earned run average: 1.90
- Shutouts: 63
- Innings pitched: 2,628.1
- Strikeouts: 1,177
- Winning percentage: .697

Career statistics
- Batting average: .245
- Hits: 312
- Home runs: 15
- Run batted in: 151
- Stats at Baseball Reference

Teams
- As player: Tokyo Kyojin (1942–1944, 1946); Chunichi Dragons (1947); Yomiuri Giants (1948–1955); As manager: Tokyo Kyojin (1944, 1946)

Career highlights and awards
- Japanese Pitching Triple Crown (1943); Eiji Sawamura Award (1949); 3 ERA titles (1943, 1946, 1949); 2x All-Star; Best Nine Award (1949); Pitched a perfect game on June 28, 1950; Pitched two no-hitters

Member of the Japanese

Baseball Hall of Fame
- Induction: 1976

Hideo Fujimoto (藤本 英雄, Fujimoto Hideo) (also known as Hideo Nakagami) (May 10, 1918 – April 26, 1997) was a Japanese baseball pitcher. He holds the Japanese records for lowest career ERA (1.90) and seasonal ERA (0.73), as well as best all-time winning percentage (.697). During his career, which spanned the one-league and two-league era, he played for the Tokyo Kyojin/Yomiuri Giants and the Chunichi Dragons. He was the player-manager of the Giants in 1944 and part of 1946 (the league cancelled all games in 1945 because of the Pacific War).

== Biography ==
Fujimoto, born as Pal-Ryong Lee (Korean: 이팔용) , was born in Busan, Korea which was part of Japanese Empire at that time, moving to Japan at age eight. He attended Shimonoseki Shogyo High School and Meiji University.

In 1943, he enjoyed one of the greatest seasons ever by a pitcher in Japan, winning the pitching triple crown. He won 34 games for the Kyojin, leading the league in wins, complete games (39), innings (432 2/3) and strikeouts (253). He threw a Japanese-record 19 shutouts and set the single-season mark for ERA at 0.73. In May 1943 he also pitched his first no-hitter, defeating Nagoya. Between August and September he threw a record six straight shutouts, going 61 2/3 innings without allowing a run, and 100 innings without allowing an earned run.

In 1944, in addition to pitching and managing, Nakagami occasionally played outfield. (He also spent significant time in the outfield in 1948.) Nakagami was a good hitter for someone who primarily played pitcher, hitting .245 with 15 career home runs (including 7 round-trippers in 1950). In 1946, Nakagami led the Japanese Baseball League in earned run average, with a mark of 2.11. Nakagami played for the Chunichi Dragons for one season in 1947, winning 17 games with a 1.83 ERA and 27 complete games. In 1949, Nakagami went 24-7 with a 1.94 ERA and 29 complete games, winning the ERA title and the Eiji Sawamura Award. He was named as one of the Best Nine for the first and only time in his career.

At Aomori Stadium, in 1950 he pitched the first perfect game in NPB history. In the 1951 Japan Series, he went 2–0, which included the decisive Game 5 as the Giants beats the Nankai Hawks to win their first ever Japan Series title. The following year, he picked up a win in Game 2 of the 1952 Japan Series that saw him hit a home run. He lost in Game 5 but the Giants prevailed in Game 6 to defeat the Hawks again. Nakagami went 1–1 in the 1953 Japan Series as the Giants defeated the Hawks for the championship for the third year in a row; in total, he went 4–2 in Japan Series games.

After his playing career, he coached for the Giants and managed in the Japanese minor leagues, Later, he managed in the industrial leagues. He also worked as the Los Angeles correspondent for Yomiuri Shimbun.

He was elected to the Japanese Baseball Hall of Fame in 1976.
