= Central League =

Nippon Professional Baseball league

Central League セントラル・リーグ
- Central League Flag
- League: Nippon Professional Baseball
- Sport: Baseball
- Founded: December 15, 1949; 76 years ago
- No. of teams: 6
- Country: Japan
- Most recent champion: Hanshin Tigers (8)
- Most titles: Yomiuri Giants (39)

The Central League (セントラル・リーグ, Sentoraru Rīgu) or Ce League (セ・リーグ, Se Rīgu), also known as the JERA Central League (JERAセ・リーグ, JERA Se Rīgu) for sponsorship reasons, is one of the two professional baseball leagues that constitute Nippon Professional Baseball in Japan. The winner of the league championship plays against the winner of the Pacific League in the annual Japan Series. It currently consists of six teams from around the country. Unlike the Pacific League, designated hitters are not used during Central League home games. The Central League has voted to adopt the designated hitter beginning in 2027.

== History ==
The Central League was founded in 1949 with eight teams: four holdovers from the previous Japanese Baseball League — the Chunichi Dragons, the Hanshin Tigers, the Yomiuri Giants, and the Shochiku Robins (formerly the Taiyō Robins) — and four new teams — the Hiroshima Carp, the Kokutetsu Swallows, the Nishi Nippon Pirates, and the Taiyō Whales.

The Nishi Nippon Pirates existed for one season — they placed sixth in 1950, and the following season merged with the also Fukuoka-based Nishitetsu Clippers (a member of the Pacific League) to form the Nishitetsu Lions, who joined the Pacific League. This brought the number of Central League teams down to an ungainly arrangement of seven.

Ryuji Suzuki became president of the Central League in 1952.

In 1952, it was decided that any team ending the season with a winning percentage below .300 would be disbanded or merged with other teams. The Shochiku Robins fell into this category, and were merged with the Taiyō Whales to become the Taiyō Shochiku Robins in January 1953. This enabled the Central League to shrink to an even number of six teams.

Ryuji Suzuki retired as CL president in 1984 after 33 years at the post.

In 2007, a new Climax Series was introduced. This playoff series was inspired by the stepladder playoff used in the Pacific League introduced in 2004 for the top three teams of the league to determine which one progressed to the Japan Series. Under the previous system, there was no post-season playoff and the winner of the pennant automatically qualified for the Japan Series.

== Current teams ==
Team	Japanese name	Founded	Location	Stadium	Owner
Chunichi Dragons	中日ドラゴンズ; Chūnichi Doragonzu	January 15, 1936	Higashi-ku, Nagoya, Aichi	Vantelin Dome Nagoya	Chunichi Shimbun
Hanshin Tigers	阪神タイガース; Hanshin Taigāsu	December 10, 1935	HQ in Nishinomiya, Hyōgo Plays between Osaka and Hyogo	Hanshin Koshien Stadium and Kyocera Dome Osaka	Hankyu Hanshin Holdings
Hiroshima Toyo Carp	広島東洋カープ; Hiroshima Tōyō Kāpu	December 5, 1949	Minami-ku, Hiroshima, Hiroshima	Mazda Stadium	Matsuda family [66.7%] Mazda [33.3%]
Tokyo Yakult Swallows	東京ヤクルトスワローズ; Tōkyō Yakuruto Suwarōzu	January 12, 1950	Shinjuku, Tokyo	Meiji Jingu Stadium	Yakult Honsha
Yokohama DeNA BayStars	横浜DeNAベイスターズ; Yokohama DeNA Beisutāzu	December 15, 1949	Naka-ku, Yokohama, Kanagawa	Yokohama Stadium	DeNA
Yomiuri Giants	読売ジャイアンツ; Yomiuri Jaiantsu	December 26, 1934	Bunkyo, Tokyo	Tokyo Dome	Yomiuri Shimbun

== Central League pennant winners ==
Year	Team	W	L	T	Postseason Result
1950	Shochiku Robins	98	35	4	Lost 1950 Japan Series 2–4 to the Mainichi Orions
1951	Yomiuri Giants	79	29	6	Won 1951 Japan Series 4–1 over the Nankai Hawks
1952	Yomiuri Giants	83	37	0	Won 1952 Japan Series 4–2 over the Nankai Hawks
1953	Yomiuri Giants	87	37	1	Won 1953 Japan Series 4–2–1 over the Nankai Hawks
1954	Chunichi Dragons	86	40	4	Won 1954 Japan Series 4–3 over the Nishitetsu Lions
1955	Yomiuri Giants	92	37	1	Won 1955 Japan Series 4–3 over the Nankai Hawks
1956	Yomiuri Giants	82	44	4	Lost 1956 Japan Series 2–4 to the Nishitetsu Lions
1957	Yomiuri Giants	74	53	3	Lost 1957 Japan Series 0–4–1 to the Nishitetsu Lions
1958	Yomiuri Giants	77	52	1	Lost 1958 Japan Series 3–4 to the Nishitetsu Lions
1959	Yomiuri Giants	77	48	5	Lost 1959 Japan Series 0–4 to the Nankai Hawks
1960	Taiyō Whales	70	56	4	Won 1960 Japan Series 4–0 over the Daimai Orions
1961	Yomiuri Giants	71	53	6	Won 1961 Japan Series 4–2 over the Nankai Hawks
1962	Hanshin Tigers	75	55	3	Lost 1962 Japan Series 2–4–1 to the Toei Flyers
1963	Yomiuri Giants	83	55	2	Won 1963 Japan Series 4–3 over the Nishitetsu Lions
1964	Hanshin Tigers	80	56	4	Lost 1964 Japan Series 3–4 to the Nankai Hawks
1965	Yomiuri Giants	91	47	2	Won 1965 Japan Series 4–1 over the Nankai Hawks
1966	Yomiuri Giants	89	41	4	Won 1966 Japan Series 4–2 over the Nankai Hawks
1967	Yomiuri Giants	84	46	4	Won 1967 Japan Series 4–2 over the Hankyu Braves
1968	Yomiuri Giants	77	53	4	Won 1968 Japan Series 4–2 over the Hankyu Braves
1969	Yomiuri Giants	73	51	6	Won 1969 Japan Series 4–2 over the Hankyu Braves
1970	Yomiuri Giants	79	47	4	Won 1970 Japan Series 4–1 over the Lotte Orions
1971	Yomiuri Giants	70	52	8	Won 1971 Japan Series 4–1 over the Hankyu Braves
1972	Yomiuri Giants	74	52	4	Won 1972 Japan Series 4–1 over the Hankyu Braves
1973	Yomiuri Giants	66	60	4	Won 1973 Japan Series 4–1 over the Nankai Hawks
1974	Chunichi Dragons	70	49	11	Lost 1974 Japan Series 2–4 to the Lotte Orions
1975	Hiroshima Toyo Carp	72	47	11	Lost 1975 Japan Series 0–4–2 to the Hankyu Braves
1976	Yomiuri Giants	76	45	9	Lost 1976 Japan Series 3–4 to the Hankyu Braves
1977	Yomiuri Giants	80	46	4	Lost 1977 Japan Series 1–4 to the Hankyu Braves
1978	Yakult Swallows	68	46	16	Won 1978 Japan Series 4–3 over the Hankyu Braves
1979	Hiroshima Toyo Carp	67	50	13	Won 1979 Japan Series 4–3 over the Kintetsu Buffaloes
1980	Hiroshima Toyo Carp	73	44	13	Won 1980 Japan Series 4–3 over the Kintetsu Buffaloes
1981	Yomiuri Giants	73	48	9	Won 1981 Japan Series 4–2 over the Nippon-Ham Fighters
1982	Chunichi Dragons	64	47	19	Lost 1982 Japan Series 2–4 to the Seibu Lions
1983	Yomiuri Giants	72	50	8	Lost 1983 Japan Series 3–4 to the Seibu Lions
1984	Hiroshima Toyo Carp	75	45	10	Won 1984 Japan Series 4–3 over the Hankyu Braves
1985	Hanshin Tigers	74	49	7	Won 1985 Japan Series 4–2 over the Seibu Lions
1986	Hiroshima Toyo Carp	73	46	11	Lost 1986 Japan Series 3–4–1 to the Seibu Lions
1987	Yomiuri Giants	76	43	11	Lost 1987 Japan Series 2–4 to the Seibu Lions
1988	Chunichi Dragons	79	46	5	Lost 1988 Japan Series 1–4 to the Seibu Lions
1989	Yomiuri Giants	84	44	2	Won 1989 Japan Series 4–3 over the Kintetsu Buffaloes
1990	Yomiuri Giants	88	42	0	Lost 1990 Japan Series 0–4 to the Seibu Lions
1991	Hiroshima Toyo Carp	74	56	2	Lost 1991 Japan Series 3–4 to the Seibu Lions
1992	Yakult Swallows	69	61	1	Lost 1992 Japan Series 3–4 to the Seibu Lions
1993	Yakult Swallows	80	50	2	Won 1993 Japan Series 4–3 over the Seibu Lions
1994	Yomiuri Giants	70	60	0	Won 1994 Japan Series 4–2 over the Seibu Lions
1995	Yakult Swallows	82	48	0	Won 1995 Japan Series 4–1 over the Orix BlueWave
1996	Yomiuri Giants	77	53	0	Lost 1996 Japan Series 1–4 to the Orix BlueWave
1997	Yakult Swallows	83	52	2	Won 1997 Japan Series 4–1 over the Seibu Lions
1998	Yokohama BayStars	79	56	1	Won 1998 Japan Series 4–2 over the Seibu Lions
1999	Chunichi Dragons	81	54	0	Lost 1999 Japan Series 1–4 to the Fukuoka Daiei Hawks
2000	Yomiuri Giants	78	57	0	Won 2000 Japan Series 4–2 over the Fukuoka Daiei Hawks
2001	Yakult Swallows	76	58	6	Won 2001 Japan Series 4–1 over the Osaka Kintetsu Buffaloes
2002	Yomiuri Giants	86	52	2	Won 2002 Japan Series 4–0 over the Seibu Lions
2003	Hanshin Tigers	87	51	2	Lost 2003 Japan Series 3–4 to the Fukuoka Daiei Hawks
2004	Chunichi Dragons	79	56	3	Lost 2004 Japan Series 3–4 to the Seibu Lions
2005	Hanshin Tigers	87	54	5	Lost 2005 Japan Series 0–4 to the Chiba Lotte Marines
2006	Chunichi Dragons	87	54	5	Lost 2006 Japan Series 1–4 to the Hokkaido Nippon-Ham Fighters
2007	Yomiuri Giants	80	63	1	Lost 2007 Central League Climax Series 0–3 to the Chunichi Dragons
2008	Yomiuri Giants	84	57	3	Lost 2008 Japan Series 3–4 to the Saitama Seibu Lions
2009	Yomiuri Giants	89	46	9	Won 2009 Japan Series 4–2 over the Hokkaido Nippon-Ham Fighters
2010	Chunichi Dragons	79	62	3	Lost 2010 Japan Series 2–4-1 to the Chiba Lotte Marines
2011	Chunichi Dragons	75	59	10	Lost 2011 Japan Series 3–4 to the Fukuoka SoftBank Hawks
2012	Yomiuri Giants	86	43	15	Won 2012 Japan Series 4–2 over the Hokkaido Nippon-Ham Fighters
2013	Yomiuri Giants	84	53	7	Lost 2013 Japan Series 3–4 to the Tohoku Rakuten Golden Eagles
2014	Yomiuri Giants	82	61	1	Lost 2014 Central League Climax Series 1–4 to the Hanshin Tigers
2015	Tokyo Yakult Swallows	76	65	2	Lost 2015 Japan Series 1–4 to the Fukuoka SoftBank Hawks
2016	Hiroshima Toyo Carp	89	52	2	Lost 2016 Japan Series 2–4 to the Hokkaido Nippon-Ham Fighters
2017	Hiroshima Toyo Carp	88	51	4	Lost 2017 Central League Climax Series 2–4 to the Yokohama DeNA BayStars
2018	Hiroshima Toyo Carp	82	59	2	Lost 2018 Japan Series 1–4-1 to the Fukuoka SoftBank Hawks
2019	Yomiuri Giants	77	64	2	Lost 2019 Japan Series 0–4 to the Fukuoka SoftBank Hawks
2020	Yomiuri Giants	67	45	8	Lost 2020 Japan Series 0–4 to the Fukuoka SoftBank Hawks
2021	Tokyo Yakult Swallows	73	52	18	Won 2021 Japan Series 4–2 over the Orix Buffaloes
2022	Tokyo Yakult Swallows	80	59	4	Lost 2022 Japan Series 2–4–1 to the Orix Buffaloes
2023	Hanshin Tigers	85	53	5	Won 2023 Japan Series 4–3 over the Orix Buffaloes
2024	Yomiuri Giants	77	59	7	Lost 2024 Central League Climax Series 3–4 to the Yokohama DeNA BayStars
2025	Hanshin Tigers	85	54	4	Lost 2025 Japan Series 4–1 to the Fukuoka SoftBank Hawks
2026	Hanshin Tigers	79	62	2	

== Climax Series winners ==
- 2025 Hanshin Tigers
- 2024 Yokohama DeNA BayStars
- 2023 Hanshin Tigers
- 2022 Tokyo Yakult Swallows
- 2021 Tokyo Yakult Swallows
- 2020 Yomiuri Giants
- 2019 Yomiuri Giants
- 2018 Hiroshima Toyo Carp
- 2017 Yokohama DeNA BayStars
- 2016 Hiroshima Toyo Carp
- 2015 Tokyo Yakult Swallows
- 2014 Hanshin Tigers
- 2013 Yomiuri Giants
- 2012 Yomiuri Giants
- 2011 Chunichi Dragons
- 2010 Chunichi Dragons
- 2009 Yomiuri Giants
- 2008 Yomiuri Giants
- 2007 Chunichi Dragons

== Central League statistics ==
Team	First	Second	Third
Yomiuri Giants	39	12	15
Chunichi Dragons	9	23	15
Hiroshima Toyo Carp	9	7	10
Tokyo Yakult Swallows	9	6	6
Hanshin Tigers	8	21	17
Yokohama DeNA BayStars	2	7	13
Shochiku Robins	1	0	0
Nishi Nippon Pirates	0	0	0

== Most Valuable Pitcher ==
See: Best Nine Award#Other notes

== See also ==
- Pacific League
