= Tsuneo Horiuchi =

Japanese baseball player and politician

- 堀内 恒夫
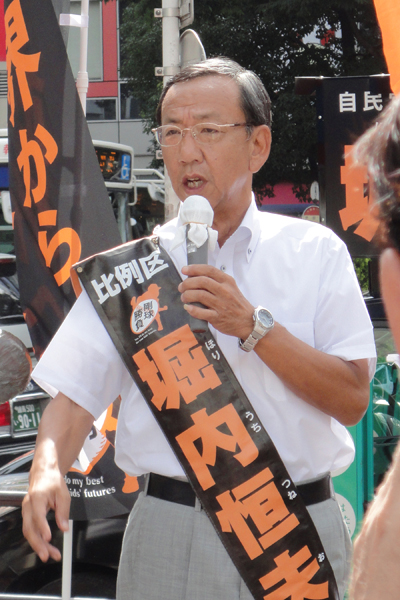
- Horiuchi in 2010

Member of the House of Councillors
- In office 6 August 2013 – 25 July 2016
- Preceded by: Hirohiko Nakamura
- Succeeded by: Multi-member district
- Constituency: National PR

Personal details
- Born: 16 January 1948 (age 78) Kōfu, Yamanashi, Japan
- Party: Liberal Democratic
- Baseball career
- Pitcher
- Batted: Right Threw: Right

NPB debut
- April 14, 1966, for the Yomiuri Giants

Last appearance
- October 22, 1983, for the Yomiuri Giants

NPB statistics
- Win–loss: 203–139
- Earned run average: 3.27
- Strikeouts: 1,865

Career statistics
- Batting average: .172
- Hits: 174
- Home runs: 21
- Run batted in: 82

Teams
- As player: Yomiuri Giants (1966–1983); As manager: Yomiuri Giants (2004–2005)

Career highlights and awards
- 1966 Central League Rookie of the Year; 2x Eiji Sawamura Award (1966, 1972); 1972 Central League MVP; Pitched a no-hitter on October 10, 1967

Member of the Japanese

Baseball Hall of Fame
- Induction: 2008

Tsuneo Horiuchi (堀内 恒夫, Horiuchi Tsuneo; born January 16, 1948) is a former professional baseball player in Japan's Nippon Professional Baseball and a politician. A right-handed pitcher, in 2008 he was voted into the Japanese Baseball Hall of Fame.

== Baseball career ==
Horiuchi played for the Yomiuri Giants his whole career, from 1966 to 1983; he was an integral part of the team's ten Japan Series championships during that period (including nine in a row).

His first season, he went 16–2 with a league-leading 1.39 earned run average, winning both the Eiji Sawamura Award and the Central League Rookie of the Year award. He led the league in winning percentage and also in most bases on balls allowed.

He led the league in winning percentage again in 1967, going 12–2 to post an amazing two-year stretch of 28–4. That year he also threw a no-hitter against the Hiroshima Carp. The next three seasons were all successful, but he again led the league in walks all three years. (Horiuchi also gave up 31 home runs in 1968 to lead the league.)

1972 was Horiuchi's finest season, as he went 26–9 with a 2.91 ERA and 26 complete games, again winning the Eiji Sawamura Award despite the fact that he led the league in hits and home runs allowed. That year he also won the Central League MVP.

In 1974 Horiuchi led the Central League in complete games with 21.

Horiuchi finished his career with 203 wins, earning him a spot in Meikyukai.

He managed the Yomiuri Giants in 2004–2005 (the team went 133-144 under his leadership). He has also acted as a TV analyst for Giants broadcasts.

== Political career ==
Horiuchi stood as a candidate of the House of Councillors election, 2010 for the LDP but lost. Receiving 101,840 preference votes nationwide, he ranked 13th on the LDP list – the party received only twelve proportional seats – and was thus the top replacement candidate for a possible kuriage-tōsen, i.e. the first candidate to be elected without an additional vote if an LDP proportional seat in the 2010 class of Councillors fell vacant. As a result, he became a member of the House of Councillors in the proportional representation segment of the class of 2010 in August 2013 as the replacement for Hirohiko Nakamura, who died on July 31, 2013.

== Statistics ==
| Year | No. | G | CG | SO | NoBB | W | L | S | W% | BF | IP | Hits | HR | BB | HBP | Ks | WP | Balks | R | ER | ERA |
|---|---|---|---|---|---|---|---|---|---|---|---|---|---|---|---|---|---|---|---|---|---|
| 1966 | 21 | 33 | 14 | 7 | 1 | 16 | 2 | | .889 | 714 | 181.0 | 125 | 5 | 69 | 4 | 117 | 5 | 0 | 34 | 28 | 1.39 |
| 1967 | 18 | 23 | 13 | 2 | 0 | 12 | 2 | | .857 | 609 | 149.0 | 126 | 7 | 59 | 1 | 82 | 6 | 0 | 41 | 36 | 2.17 |
| 1968 | 18 | 40 | 12 | 3 | 0 | 17 | 10 | | .630 | 845 | 206.2 | 153 | 31 | 105 | 4 | 142 | 4 | 0 | 81 | 76 | 3.30 |
| 1969 | 18 | 41 | 12 | 4 | 0 | 14 | 13 | | .519 | 1004 | 236.2 | 211 | 21 | 107 | 6 | 160 | 6 | 1 | 94 | 82 | 3.11 |
| 1970 | 18 | 42 | 18 | 1 | 0 | 18 | 10 | | .643 | 1130 | 282.2 | 202 | 22 | 103 | 7 | 228 | 2 | 0 | 82 | 65 | 2.07 |
| 1971 | 18 | 40 | 14 | 3 | 0 | 14 | 8 | | .636 | 924 | 226.0 | 183 | 18 | 82 | 6 | 155 | 7 | 0 | 83 | 78 | 3.11 |
| 1972 | 18 | 48 | 26 | 4 | 1 | 26 | 9 | | .743 | 1282 | 312.0 | 292 | 34 | 95 | 3 | 203 | 3 | 0 | 110 | 101 | 2.91 |
| 1973 | 18 | 39 | 15 | 2 | 1 | 12 | 17 | | .414 | 953 | 221.0 | 238 | 28 | 70 | 6 | 113 | 1 | 1 | 117 | 111 | 4.52 |
| 1974 | 18 | 46 | 21 | 3 | 1 | 19 | 11 | 1 | .633 | 1106 | 276.2 | 217 | 31 | 80 | 7 | 127 | 2 | 0 | 101 | 82 | 2.66 |
| 1975 | 18 | 38 | 8 | 2 | 1 | 10 | 18 | 0 | .357 | 893 | 213.2 | 212 | 28 | 75 | 6 | 118 | 4 | 1 | 100 | 90 | 3.79 |
| 1976 | 18 | 34 | 11 | 2 | 0 | 14 | 6 | 0 | .700 | 763 | 177.1 | 173 | 23 | 71 | 4 | 82 | 2 | 0 | 84 | 78 | 3.97 |
| 1977 | 18 | 34 | 4 | 1 | 1 | 10 | 9 | 3 | .526 | 657 | 151.1 | 163 | 20 | 53 | 5 | 86 | 3 | 0 | 81 | 77 | 4.59 |
| 1978 | 18 | 35 | 7 | 3 | 1 | 12 | 9 | 0 | .571 | 829 | 201.0 | 190 | 22 | 59 | 3 | 113 | 1 | 0 | 86 | 79 | 3.54 |
| 1979 | 18 | 24 | 1 | 0 | 0 | 4 | 7 | 0 | .364 | 400 | 86.1 | 111 | 16 | 35 | 2 | 59 | 1 | 0 | 68 | 64 | 6.70 |
| 1980 | 18 | 19 | 2 | 0 | 0 | 3 | 5 | 1 | .375 | 319 | 75.0 | 78 | 12 | 22 | 1 | 58 | 0 | 0 | 43 | 36 | 4.32 |
| 1981 | 18 | 9 | 0 | 0 | 0 | 1 | 3 | 0 | .250 | 92 | 22.0 | 27 | 3 | 1 | 0 | 11 | 1 | 0 | 16 | 11 | 4.50 |
| 1982 | 18 | 4 | 0 | 0 | 0 | 0 | 0 | 0 | .000 | 29 | 7.0 | 8 | 0 | 0 | 0 | 2 | 0 | 0 | 5 | 3 | 3.86 |
| 1983 | 18 | 11 | 0 | 0 | 0 | 1 | 0 | 1 | 1.000 | 79 | 19.2 | 16 | 2 | 9 | 1 | 9 | 0 | 0 | 9 | 9 | 4.12 |
| Career | | 566 | 178 | 37 | 7 | 203 | 139 | 6 | .594 | 12628 | 3045 | 2725 | 323 | 1095 | 66 | 1865 | 48 | 3 | 1235 | 1106 | 3.27 |
