= Eiji Sawamura Award =

Japanese baseball award

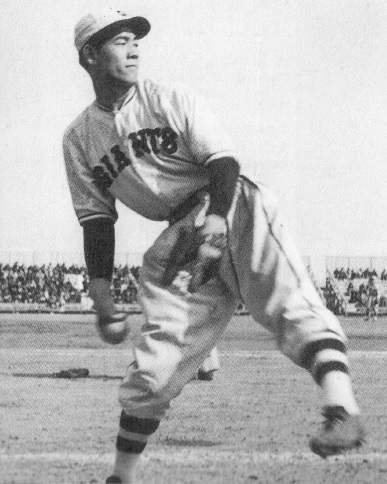
Eiji Sawamura with the Tokyo Kyojin.

The Eiji Sawamura Award (沢村栄治賞, Sawamura Eiji-shō), commonly known as the Sawamura Award, is an honor bestowed upon the top starting pitcher in Nippon Professional Baseball each year, when deemed necessary.

The award was originally established by Japanese magazine "Nekkyū" in 1947 to honor the career of Eiji Sawamura, a power pitcher who enjoyed an illustrious career for the Tokyo Giants before being killed in combat during World War II. It is a special award that is independent of the official Most Valuable Pitcher award that is presented to one pitcher in each league (Central and Pacific) each year.

== Overview ==
=== Selection process ===
One starting pitcher in Nippon Professional Baseball is chosen at the end of each season based on the following selection criteria.

- Games started: 25 or more
- Wins: 15 or more
- Complete games: 10 or more (1947–2025), 8 or more (2026–)
- Winning percentage: .600 or higher
- Innings pitched: 200 or more (1947–2025), 180 or more (2026–)
- Earned run average (ERA): 2.50 or lower
- Strikeouts: 150 or more

The selection criteria were established in 1982; prior to this, a pool of journalists voted on the pitcher they thought was most deserving of the award without any particular criteria. These simply serve as guidelines; while the pitcher who fulfills the most criteria has the most likelihood of winning, pitchers who do not fulfill all seven criteria have often been presented the award.

In the rare event that another pitcher has a season that is deemed more outstanding, a pitcher may, in turn, fulfill all seven criteria and not win the award. In 2008, Hokkaido Nippon Ham Fighters starting pitcher Yu Darvish (16–4 win–loss record, 1.88 ERA, 208 strikeouts) fulfilled all seven criteria, but Tohoku Rakuten Golden Eagles starting pitcher Hisashi Iwakuma won the award despite meeting only six criteria because it was deemed that Iwakuma (21–4, 1.87 ERA, 159 strikeouts) had the better season overall.

The selection committee usually consists of five former pitchers.

=== Other notes ===
Because it began as an independent award by Nekkyū, a magazine catered towards Giants fans, only Central League pitchers were eligible to win the award from 1950 (the first year the NPB employed the current two-league format) to 1989. The first pitcher to be bestowed the honors from the Pacific League was Hideo Nomo for the Kintetsu Buffaloes in 1990.

No pitcher was found to be sufficiently deserving of the award in 1971, 1980, 1984, 2000, 2019, and 2024. The award has been presented to two pitchers in the same season twice (1966, 2003).

== Winners ==
Bold names indicate pitchers who met all seven criteria (limited to 1982 and later winners)

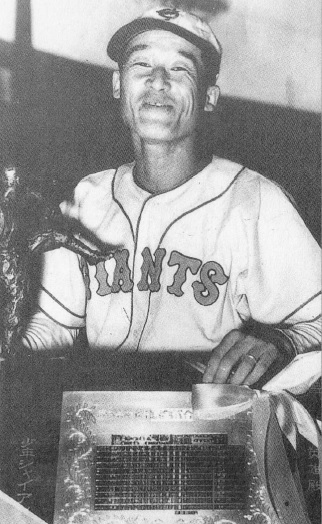
Hideo Fujimoto, when he won Eiji Sawamura Award in 1949.

Year	Player	Team	Ref
1947	Takehiko Bessho	Nankai Hawks	
1948	Hiroshi Nakao	Yomiuri Giants	
1949	Hideo Fujimoto	Yomiuri Giants	
1950	Shigeo Sanada	Shochiku Robins	
1951	Shigeru Sugishita	Chunichi Dragons	
1952	Shigeru Sugishita	Chunichi Dragons	
1953	Takumi Otomo	Yomiuri Giants	
1954	Shigeru Sugishita	Chunichi Dragons	
1955	Takehiko Bessho	Yomiuri Giants	
1956	Masaichi Kaneda	Kokutetsu Swallows	
1957	Masaichi Kaneda	Kokutetsu Swallows	
1958	Masaichi Kaneda	Kokutetsu Swallows	
1959	Minoru Murayama	Hanshin Tigers	
1960	Ritsuo Horimoto	Yomiuri Giants	
1961	Hiroshi Gondo	Chunichi Dragons	
1962	Masaaki Koyama	Hanshin Tigers	
1963	Yoshiaki Ito	Yomiuri Giants	
1964	Gene Bacque	Hanshin Tigers	
1965	Minoru Murayama	Hanshin Tigers	
1966	Minoru Murayama	Hanshin Tigers	
1966	Tsuneo Horiuchi	Yomiuri Giants	
1967	Kentaro Ogawa	Chunichi Dragons	
1968	Yutaka Enatsu	Hanshin Tigers	
1969	Kazumi Takahashi	Yomiuri Giants	
1970	Masaji Hiramatsu	Taiyo Whales	
1971	Not awarded		
1972	Tsuneo Horiuchi	Yomiuri Giants	
1973	Kazumi Takahashi	Yomiuri Giants	
1974	Senichi Hoshino	Chunichi Dragons	
1975	Yoshiro Sotokoba	Hiroshima Toyo Carp	
1976	Kojiro Ikegaya	Hiroshima Toyo Carp	
1977	Shigeru Kobayashi	Yomiuri Giants	
1978	Hiromu Matsuoka	Yakult Swallows	
1979	Shigeru Kobayashi	Hanshin Tigers	
1980	Not awarded		
1981	Takashi Nishimoto	Yomiuri Giants	
1982	**Manabu Kitabeppu**	Hiroshima Toyo Carp	
1983	Kazuhiko Endo	Yokohama Taiyo Whales	
1984	Not awarded		
1985	Tatsuo Komatsu	Chunichi Dragons	
1986	Manabu Kitabeppu	Hiroshima Toyo Carp	
1987	**Masumi Kuwata**	Yomiuri Giants	
1988	Yutaka Ohno	Hiroshima Toyo Carp	
Starting this year, pitchers from the Pacific League also became eligible for selection.
1989	**Masaki Saito**	Yomiuri Giants	
1990	Hideo Nomo	Kintetsu Buffaloes	
1991	**Shinji Sasaoka**	Hiroshima Toyo Carp	
1992	Takehiro Ishii	Seibu Lions	
1993	**Shinji Imanaka**	Chunichi Dragons	
1994	Masahiro Yamamoto	Chunichi Dragons	
1995	Masaki Saito	Yomiuri Giants	
1996	Masaki Saito	Yomiuri Giants	
1997	Fumiya Nishiguchi	Seibu Lions	
1998	Kenjiro Kawasaki	Yakult Swallows	
1999	Koji Uehara	Yomiuri Giants	
2000	Not awarded		
2001	Daisuke Matsuzaka	Seibu Lions	
2002	Koji Uehara	Yomiuri Giants	
2003	Kei Igawa	Hanshin Tigers	
2003	Kazumi Saito	Fukuoka Daiei Hawks	
2004	Kenshin Kawakami	Chunichi Dragons	
2005	Toshiya Sugiuchi	Fukuoka SoftBank Hawks	
2006	Kazumi Saito	Fukuoka SoftBank Hawks	
2007	**Yu Darvish**	Hokkaido Nippon-Ham Fighters	
2008	Hisashi Iwakuma	Tohoku Rakuten Golden Eagles	
2009	**Hideaki Wakui**	Saitama Seibu Lions	
2010	Kenta Maeda	Hiroshima Toyo Carp	
2011	**Masahiro Tanaka**	Tohoku Rakuten Golden Eagles	
2012	Tadashi Settsu	Fukuoka SoftBank Hawks	
2013	Masahiro Tanaka	Tohoku Rakuten Golden Eagles	
2014	Chihiro Kaneko	Orix Buffaloes	
2015	Kenta Maeda	Hiroshima Toyo Carp	
2016	Kris Johnson	Hiroshima Toyo Carp	
2017	Tomoyuki Sugano	Yomiuri Giants	
2018	Tomoyuki Sugano	Yomiuri Giants	
2019	Not awarded		
2020	Yūdai Ōno	Chunichi Dragons	
2021	Yoshinobu Yamamoto	Orix Buffaloes	
2022	Yoshinobu Yamamoto	Orix Buffaloes	
2023	Yoshinobu Yamamoto	Orix Buffaloes	
2024	Not awarded		
2025	Hiromi Itoh	Hokkaido Nippon-Ham Fighters	
2026	Haruto Takahashi	Hanshin Tigers	

== See also ==
- Nippon Professional Baseball § Awards
- Baseball awards § Japan
- List of Nippon Professional Baseball earned run average champions
- Cy Young Award (MLB)
- Choi Dong-won Award (KBO League)
