= Tokuji Iida =

Japanese baseball player (1924–2000)

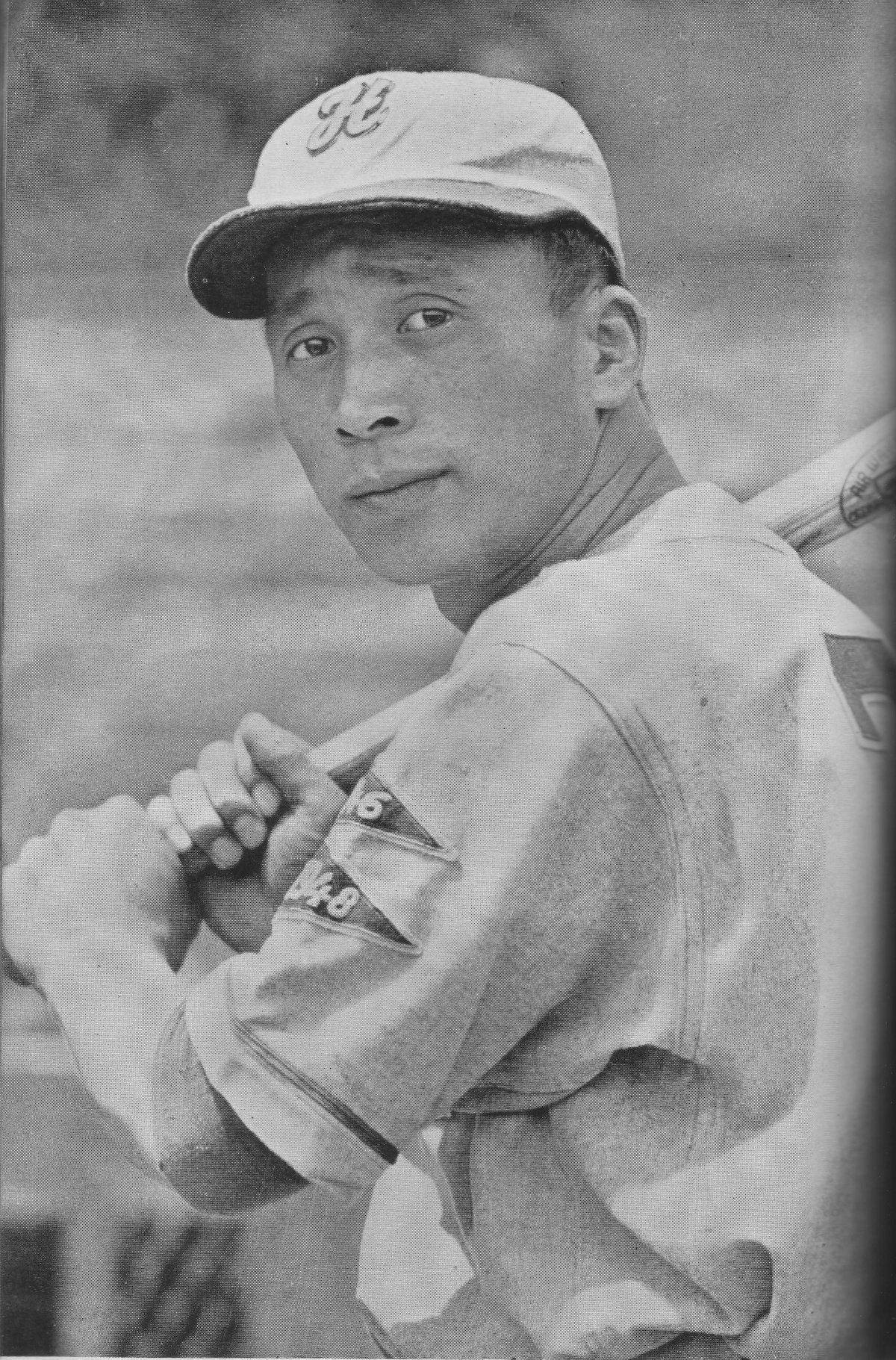
- First baseman / Manager
- Born: April 6, 1924; Yokohama, Japan
- Died: June 19, 2000 (aged 76)
- Batted: Right Threw: Right

NPB debut
- 1947, for the Nankai Hawks

Last appearance
- 1963, for the Kokutetsu Swallows

NPB statistics
- Batting average: .284
- Hits: 1,978
- Home runs: 183
- Runs batted in: 969
- Stolen base: 390

Teams
- As player: Nankai Hawks (1947–1957); Kokutestu Swallows (1957–1963); As manager: Sankei Atoms (1966–1967); Nankai Hawks (1969); As coach: Kokutetsu Swallows / Sankei Swallows (1964–1965); Nankai Hawks (1968)

Career highlights and awards
- 5× Best Nine Award (1950–1953, 1955); Pacific League MVP (1955); NPB record for most games played in a season (154)

Member of the Japanese

Baseball Hall of Fame
- Induction: 1981

Tokuji Iida (飯田 徳治, Iida Tokuji; April 6, 1924 – June 19, 2000) was a Japanese Nippon Professional Baseball first baseman. He both batted and threw right-handed.

Iida spent most of his 16-year career with the Nankai Hawks, where he won 5 Best Nine Awards, 4 Pacific League pennants, and a Pacific League MVP Award in 1955. He spent the remainder of his career with the Kokutestu Swallows, with his final season in 1963. He played 1,246 consecutive games until finally taking a rest day on May 24, 1958.

== Early life ==
Iida was born in Yokohama and played baseball at Asano High School. He did not go to college.

== Playing career ==
=== Nankai Hawks ===
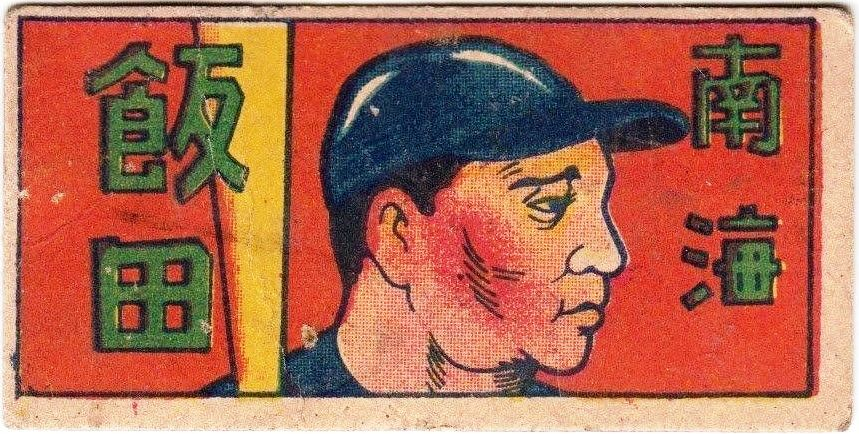
1948 baseball menko depicting Iida

Iida began his professional career with the Nankai Hawks of the Japanese Baseball League in 1947. He found success relatively quickly, leading the team in hits in 1949, and winning 4 consecutive Best Nine Awards from 1950 through 1953. He led the league in RBIs in 1951. In 1955, he was both a Best Nine Award winner and a Pacific League MVP. He was also chosen as the leading hitter of the Japan Series after hitting two home runs. In 1956, he played 154 games, setting an NPB record, which is shared with Kohei Sugayama and Shinya Sazaki. With the Hawks, Kazuto Tsuruoka, Chusuke Kizuka, Kazuo Kageyama, and Iida all made up what was known as the Million Dollar Infield, with Tsuruoka and Iida becoming Hall of Famers, Kizuka a six-time All-Star, and Kageyama a Rookie of the Year award winner.

=== Kokutestu Swallows ===
Iida went to the Swallows of Kokotestu for the 1957 season. As a Swallow, he ended his 1,246-game long streak of playing on May 24, 1958. He ranked second in the league in total hits in 1957, and 5th in 1959. By 1960, he was out of the top 10, and by 1963, he was out of the league.

== Managerial career and death ==
Iida became the 8th manager of the Swallows, then-called the Atoms, in 1966, being replaced by Takehiko Bessho in 1968 after 3 consecutive losing seasons. Soon after, in 1969, he was appointed manager of the Hawks, being replaced with Katsuya Nomura the next year, following a 50-76-4 campaign, finishing last in the Pacific League. His NPB managerial record was 224-292-18.

Iida died on June 19, 2000, at the age of 76.
