= Kazuo Kageyama =

Japanese baseball player (1927–1965)

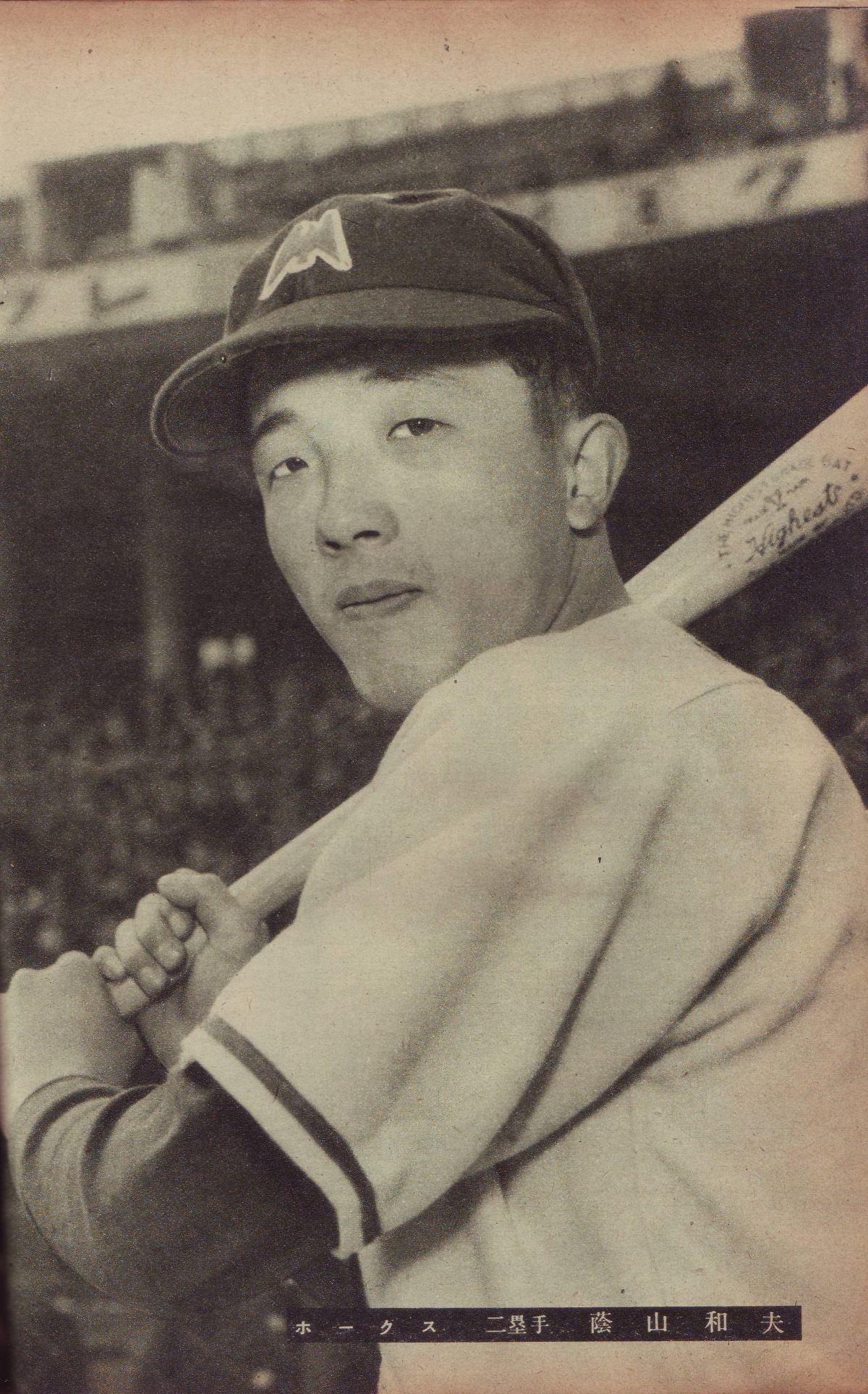
- Kazuo Kageyama 1950
- Third basemen
- Born: January 16, 1927; Osaka, Japan
- Died: November 17, 1965 (aged 38)
- Batted: Right Threw: Right

NPB debut
- March 11, 1950, for the Nankai Hawks

Last appearance
- October 20, 1959, for the Nankai Hawks

NPB statistics
- Batting average: .264
- Runs batted in: 302
- Home runs: 53
- Stats at Baseball Reference

Teams
- Nankai Hawks (1950–1959)

Career highlights and awards
- Pacific League Rookie of the Year (1951); 2× Best Nine Award (1951, 1952); 1959 Japan Series champion

Kazuo Kageyama (蔭山 和夫, Kageyama Kazuo; January 16, 1927 – November 17, 1965) was a Japanese professional baseball third basemen and manager for the Nankai Hawks of Nippon Professional Baseball (NPB). He was named manager of the Hawks in November 1965, but died of a sleeping pill overdose later that month.
