= Osaka Stadium =

Demolished stadium in Japan

Coordinates: 34°39′41″N 135°30′06″E

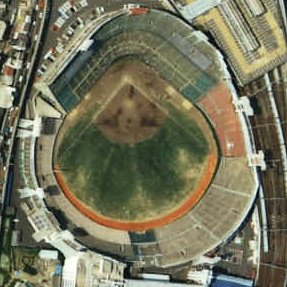
- Interactive map of Osaka Stadium
- Location: Naniwa-ku, Osaka, Japan
- Owner: Osaka Stadium Corporation
- Capacity: 31,379
- Surface: Grass
- Field size: Left and Right Field – 91.5 m Left and Right Center – 109.7 m Center Field – 115.8 m Backstop – 18.3 m

Construction
- Groundbreaking: 9 January 1950; 76 years ago
- Built: January 1950; 76 years ago
- Opened: 12 September 1950; 75 years ago
- Closed: November 1998; 27 years ago
- Demolished: 2000; 26 years ago
- Architect: Junzo Sakakura

Tenants
- Nankai Hawks (1950–1988); Kintetsu Pearls (1950–1957); Yosho Robins (1953–1954)

Osaka Stadium (Japanese: 大阪球場), owned by Osaka Stadium Corporation (大阪スダヂアム興業株式会社), was a stadium in Naniwa-ku, Osaka, Japan. It opened in 1950, with a capacity of 32,000 people. It was built over the site of a red-brick tobacco plant which was destroyed during the bombing of Osaka during World War II. The stadium was torn down in 1998 and was replaced by the office and shopping complex of Namba Parks in several stages, with final construction ending in April 2007.

The stadium was primarily used for baseball and was home of the Nankai Hawks until they moved to the Heiwadai Stadium in Fukuoka (subsequently becoming the Fukuoka Daiei Hawks, and are now the Fukuoka Softbank Hawks) in 1988.

Madonna kicked off her Who's That Girl World Tour at the stadium with two sold-out concerts on June 14 and 15, 1987. They were her first concerts in Japan.

Michael Jackson concluded the first leg of his Bad World Tour at the stadium, with three consecutive sold-out shows on October 10–12, 1987.

== Gallery ==
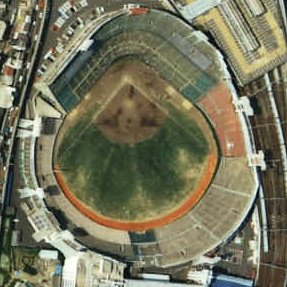
Osaka stadium in 1985 from air, taken by MLIT.

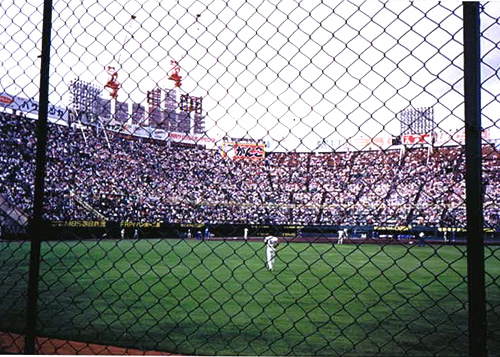
Osaka stadium in 1988, (Taken from the right field)

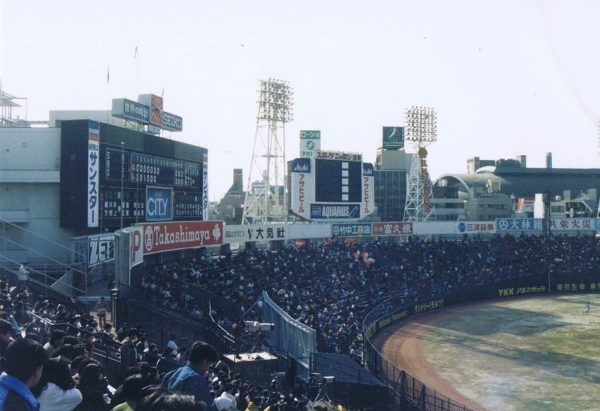
Scoreboard and backstand from the left field in 1989.

== See also ==
- Namba Parks
