= Takehiko Bessho =

Japanese baseball player (1922–1999)

Takehiko Bessho 別所 毅彦
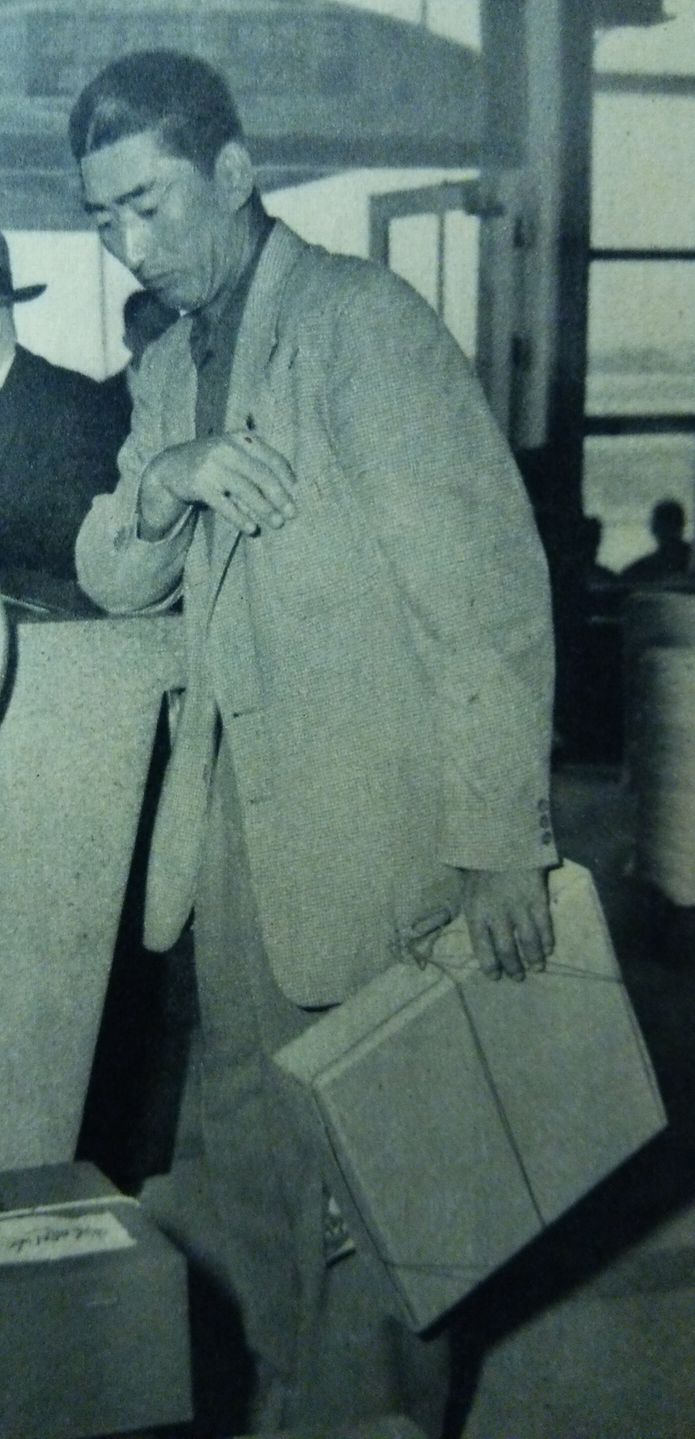
- Bessho in 1955
- Pitcher / Manager
- Born: October 1, 1922; Kobe, Hyōgo
- Died: June 24, 1999 (aged 76)
- Batted: Right Threw: Right

JBL debut
- 1942, for the Nankai Hawks

Last NPB appearance
- 1960, for the Yomiuri Giants

JBL/NPB statistics
- Win–loss: 310–178
- Earned run average: 2.18
- Shutouts: 72
- Innings pitched: 4,350.2
- Strikeouts: 1,934

Career statistics
- Batting average: .254
- Hits: 500
- Home runs: 35
- Run batted in: 248
- Stats at Baseball Reference

Teams
- As player: Nankai/Great Ring/Nankai Hawks (1942–1943, 1946–1948); Yomiuri Giants (1949–1960); As coach: Yomiuri Giants (1961–1962); Taiyo Whales (1964–1966); As manager: Sankei Atoms/Atoms/Yakult Atoms (1968–1970)

Career highlights and awards
- 2× Central League MVP (1952, 1956); 2× Japan Series MVP (1952, 1955); 2x Eiji Sawamura Award (1947, 1955); 6x Best Nine Award (1947, 1948, 1951, 1952, 1955, 1956); Pitched a no-hitter on May 26, 1943

Member of the Japanese

Baseball Hall of Fame
- Induction: 1979
- Election method: Selection Committee for Players

Takehiko Bessho (別所 毅彦, Bessho Takehiko; October 1, 1922 – June 24, 1999), born Akira Bessho (別所 昭, Bessho Akira), was a Japanese baseball player whose professional career as a player lasted from 1942 until 1960. Bessho first achieved fame as a pitcher in Japanese professional baseball; later, he served as a Nippon Professional Baseball (NPB) manager.

Bessho spent his first five seasons in the Japanese Baseball League (the predecessor of NPB) with the Nankai franchise (1942–43, 1946–48) and his final 12 seasons with the Yomiuri Giants (1949–1960). He quickly established himself as a top pitcher and went on to earn two Sawamura Awards, the Japanese equivalent of the Cy Young Award, and six Best Nine Awards. In 1947, Bessho set the JBL record for most complete games in a single season (47). In addition, Bessho earned the NPB Most Valuable Player Award in 1952 and 1956. Bessho retired after the 1960 season with 310 wins, a 2.18 earned run average, and 1,932 strikeouts. Up until 2019, he was also the only Hawk to ever throw a no-hitter.

After he retired from the sport as a player and a manager, Bessho became a sports broadcaster. In recognition of his accomplishments, the Japanese Baseball Hall of Fame inducted Bessho in 1979.

== Biography ==
=== Early life and education ===
Raised solely by his mother, Besho grew up in Kobe, Hyōgo, Japan and went by the name Akira Bessho. Bessho started his athletic career by playing nanshiki (rubber baseball) while he was in the fifth grade in elementary school. By the time he started his high school career at Takikawa Junior High School, Bessho had transitioned from nanshiki to baseball.

In 1940 and 1941, Bessho appeared in the Koshien tournament. During the 1941 spring edition, he pitched all fourteen innings of a game despite his broken arm; unfortunately, he also lost the decision. After his graduation, Bessho took the entrance exam for Keio University but ultimately enrolled in vocational classes at Nihon University.

=== Professional career ===
==== Nankai ====
In 1942, Bessho joined the Nankai franchise, an Osaka-based team in the Japanese Baseball League (JBL). Bessho quickly established himself as a quality player, both as a pitcher and a hitter. In fact, he was so good at batting that the manager had him play in the field (either at first base or the outfield) when he didn't pitch. On May 26, 1943, Bessho pitched a no-hitter against the Yamato team.

In December of that year, the Japanese army conscripted Bessho and sent him to Manchuria because of World War II. However, in 1944, Bessho moved to the officer's school in Matsudo, Chiba before the army finally moved him to the Kōchi Prefecture. After the war had ended, Bessho rejoined Nankai in 1946.

In 1947 he won and completed 47 games, still a Nippon Pro Baseball record, of which he was proud for many years. For his efforts, Bessho became the inaugural winner of the Eiji Sawamura Award. He would win the award again in 1955.

==== Yomiuri Giants ====
In the late part of 1948 he moved to the Yomiuri Giants. This became a big scandal in Japanese sports journalism, known as the Bessho head-hunting Incident (ja: 別所引き抜き事件) which led the league to put sanctions on him which prohibit him playing for two months. For the Yomiuri Giants, he was still a star.

In 1956, the Brooklyn Dodgers a Major League Baseball franchise, decided to play a series of games in Japan. On October 23, 1956, the Dodgers faced the Yomiuri Giants at Maruyama Stadium in Sapporo. Carl Erskine started for the Dodgers, and Sho Horiuchi started for the Giants. In the seventh inning, Bessho replaced Horiuchi and pitched the rest of the game. Unfortunately, Bessho surrendered a solo-home run to Duke Snider in the top of the ninth inning; it was the only run of the game.

In 1960 he was a player and pitching coach for the Yomiuri Giants. At the end of season he retired and remained on the team as coach. His 310 victories were the NPB all-time record when he retired. During his career, Bessho won six Best Nine Awards, starting in 1947. He tied for the honor in 1948 with Hiroshi Nakao and Juzo Sanada. It is currently the only time multiple pitchers were named to the Best Nine in a single season and the only time there was a positional tie for nearly six decades; he has the most Best Nine Awards for all pitchers in NPB history. In addition, he won two MVP awards, led the league in strikeouts from 1950 until 1952, and won 20 or more games eight different seasons. He led the NPB in ivcotires three times and in ERA, strikeouts, and winning percentage once each. With 72 career shutouts, he ranks fourth all-time in Japanese professional baseball.

=== Post-playing career ===
From 1964 until 1966, Bessho served as the pitching coach of the Taiyō Whales. He managed the Sankei Atoms from 1968 until mid-1970.

Afterwards, he gave commentaries at Fuji TV, Bunka Hōsō and Nikkan Sports. As a commentator, he was known for his cheerful loud laughter, grayed hair, and apparent but innocent favoritism toward the Yomiuri Giants (he often couldn't remember the names of non-Giants players).

In 1979 he was nominated to Japanese Baseball Hall of Fame.

In 1992 he surmounted to the presidency of the Yomiuri Giants Old Boy Club, succeeding Tetsuharu Kawakami.

=== Death ===
In 1999, he died at his home at the age of 76.

== Records and awards ==
- Lifetime records as pitcher: playing in 662 games (335 completed), 310 wins, 178 losses, winning average .635, ERA 2.18
- Lifetime records as batter: playing in 828 games, batting average .254, 500 hits, 35 home-runs, 91 walks, 2 hit-by-pitch, RBI 248
- No-hitter: 26 May 1943 (defeated the Yamato Team)
- Best Nine Award (Pitcher): 1947, 1948, 1951, 1952, 1955, 1956
