= 1994 Japan Series =

Team (Wins)	Managers	Season
Yomiuri Giants (4)	Shigeo Nagashima	70–60, .538, GA: 1
Seibu Lions (2)	Masaaki Mori	76–52–2, .594, GA: 7.5
- Dates: October 22–29
- MVP: Hiromi Makihara (YOM)
- FSA: Kazuhiro Kiyohara (SEI)

Broadcast
- Television: Japan: NTV (Games 1,2,6),TV Asahi (Games 3-5), NHK BS1 (Games 1-6); USA: Prime/SportsChannel regional sports networks (one-week delay)
- TV announcers: USA: Ken Harrelson, Tom Paciorek, Wayne Graczyk
- Radio: Japan: NHK Radio 1, TBS (JRN), JOQR (NRN), NBS (NRN), Radio Nippon, NACK5 FM

The 1994 Japan Series was the championship series of Nippon Professional Baseball (NPB) for the 1994 season. The 45th edition of the Series, it was a best-of-seven playoff that matched the Pacific League champion Seibu Lions against the Central League champion Yomiuri Giants. The series was the eighth time the two franchises played each other for the championship. The Giants had advanced to the series due to their victory in the 1994 Central League tie-breaker game against the Chunichi Dragons.

Because this year's edition of the Japan Series took place during the Major League Baseball strike that scuttled the entire postseason, including the World Series, it received much more attention than normal in the United States. Most memorably, the cover of the October 31 issue of Sports Illustrated featured Lions pitcher Hisanobu Watanabe along with the tagline "The World's Series", in the Lions' 11-0 win in Game One. Chicago-area Regional Sports Networks broadcast the game in English on a week delay basis, with Ken Harrelson being the lead broadcaster. This resulted eventually in Major League Baseball acquiring Japanese players upon the end of the strike.

Two members of the winning Yomiuri Giants team -- Hideki Matsui (2009) and Dan Gladden (1987, 1991) -- also won a World Series.

In order to accommodate television, select games would be played at night. This was the second Japan Series to feature night games after 1964 Japan Series although the night games were only on weekdays, and the first with a reduction in extra innings. The Series, which had an 18-inning limit before a tie game, adopted a 15-inning limit before Series night games were tied.

== Summary ==
CL Yomiuri Giants (4) vs. PL Seibu Lions (2)

Game	Date	Score	Location	Time	Attendance
1	October 22	Seibu Lions – 11, Yomiuri Giants – 0	Tokyo Dome	2:57	46,177
2	October 23	Seibu Lions – 0, Yomiuri Giants – 1	Tokyo Dome	2:25	46,342
3	October 25	Yomiuri Giants – 2, Seibu Lions – 1	Seibu Lions Stadium	3:20	31,838
4	October 26	Yomiuri Giants – 5, Seibu Lions – 6	Seibu Lions Stadium	4:12	31,883
5	October 27	Yomiuri Giants – 9, Seibu Lions – 3	Seibu Lions Stadium	3:40	31,872
6	October 29	Seibu Lions – 1, Yomiuri Giants – 3	Tokyo Dome	2:53	46,307

== Matchups ==
=== Game 1 ===
Saturday, October 22, 1994 1:03 pm (JST) at Tokyo Dome, Bunkyo, Tokyo
Team	1	2	3	4	5	6	7	8	9	R	H	E
Seibu	0	1	3	0	0	0	7	0	0	11	10	0
Yomiuri	0	0	0	0	0	0	0	0	0	0	4	0
WP: Hisanobu Watanabe (1–0) LP: Masumi Kuwata (0–1); Home runs: SEI: Kazuhiro Kiyohara (1), Norio Tanabe (1); YOM: None

=== Game 2 ===
Sunday, October 23, 1994 1:02 pm (JST) at Tokyo Dome, Bunkyo, Tokyo
Team	1	2	3	4	5	6	7	8	9	R	H	E
Seibu	0	0	0	0	0	0	0	0	0	0	4	1
Yomiuri	1	0	0	0	0	0	0	0	X	1	2	0
WP: Hiromi Makihara (1–0) LP: Kimiyasu Kudoh (0–1)

=== Game 3 ===
Tuesday, October 25, 1994 6:16 pm (JST) at Seibu Lions Stadium, Tokorozawa, Saitama
Team	1	2	3	4	5	6	7	8	9	10	R	H	E
Yomiuri	1	0	0	0	0	0	0	0	0	1	2	5	1
Seibu	0	0	0	1	0	0	0	0	0	0	1	10	1
WP: Hiroshi Ishige (1–0) LP: Takehiro Ishii (0–1) Sv: Masumi Kuwata (1)

=== Game 4 ===
Wednesday, October 26, 1994 6:15 pm (JST) at Seibu Lions Stadium, Tokorozawa, Saitama
Team	1	2	3	4	5	6	7	8	9	10	11	12	R	H	E
Yomiuri	0	2	0	0	2	0	0	0	1	0	0	0	5	14	0
Seibu	1	0	0	0	0	1	0	3	0	0	0	1	6	13	2
WP: Takehiro Ishii (1–1) LP: Masao Kida (0–1); Home runs: YOM: Hideki Matsui (1), Hiromoto Okubo (1); SEI: Kazuhiro Kiyohara (2)

=== Game 5 ===
Thursday, October 27, 1994 6:15 pm (JST) at Seibu Lions Stadium, Tokorozawa, Saitama
Team	1	2	3	4	5	6	7	8	9	R	H	E
Yomiuri	0	0	1	0	0	4	0	3	1	9	10	1
Seibu	1	0	0	0	0	1	0	1	0	3	10	0
WP: Masumi Kuwata (1–1) LP: Kento Sugiyama (0–1); Home runs: YOM: Sadaaki Yoshimura (1), Koichi Ogata (1), Henry Cotto (1); SEI: Kazuhiro Kiyohara 2 (4)

=== Game 6 ===
Saturday, October 29, 1994 1:01 pm (JST) at Tokyo Dome, Bunkyo, Tokyo
Team	1	2	3	4	5	6	7	8	9	R	H	E
Seibu	0	0	0	0	0	0	0	1	0	1	7	0
Yomiuri	0	1	1	0	0	0	0	1	X	3	10	0
WP: Hiromi Makihara (2–0) LP: Kimiyasu Kudoh (0–2); Home runs: SEI: None; YOM: Henry Cotto (2)

== See also ==
Nippon Professional Baseball
