= 2021 Saitama Seibu Lions season =

2021 Saitama Seibu Lions
- League: Pacific League
- Ballpark: MetLife Dome
- Record: 55-70-18 (.440)
- League place: 6th
- Parent company: Seibu Railway
- Manager: Hatsuhiko Tsuji

The 2021 Saitama Seibu Lions season was the 71st season of the franchise in Nippon Professional Baseball, their 42nd season in Saitama, under Seibu Group, and playing at the MetLife Dome. It was the team's 4th season under manager Hatsuhiko Tsuji, who has managed the Lions for 4 years. The Lions, for the 2nd year in a row, failed to qualify for the playoffs, going all the way down in last place.

== Regular season ==
The Lions finished in 6th place, going 55–70–18, with a .440 winning percentage. This is the 2nd year in a row the Lions failed to qualify for the playoffs.

2021 Pacific League standings
| Pos | Team | GP | W | L | T | .Pct | GB | Home | Road |
|---|---|---|---|---|---|---|---|---|---|
| 1 | Orix Buffaloes | 143 | 70 | 55 | 18 | .560 | — | 38-22-12 | 32–33–6 |
| 2 | Chiba Lotte Marines | 143 | 67 | 57 | 19 | .540 | 2½ | 33-32-7 | 34–25–12 |
| 3 | Tohoku Rakuten Golden Eagles | 143 | 66 | 62 | 15 | .514 | 5½ | 31-33-8 | 35–29–7 |
| 4 | Fukuoka SoftBank Hawks | 143 | 60 | 62 | 21 | .492 | 8½ | 31-29-11 | 29–33–10 |
| 5 | Hokkaido Nippon-Ham Fighters | 143 | 55 | 68 | 20 | .447 | 14 | 25-36-10 | 30–32–10 |
| 6 | Saitama Seibu Lions | 143 | 55 | 70 | 18 | .440 | 15 | 30-34-7 | 25–36–11 |
