= Norio Tanabe =

Japanese baseball player, coach, and manager

Norio Tanebe
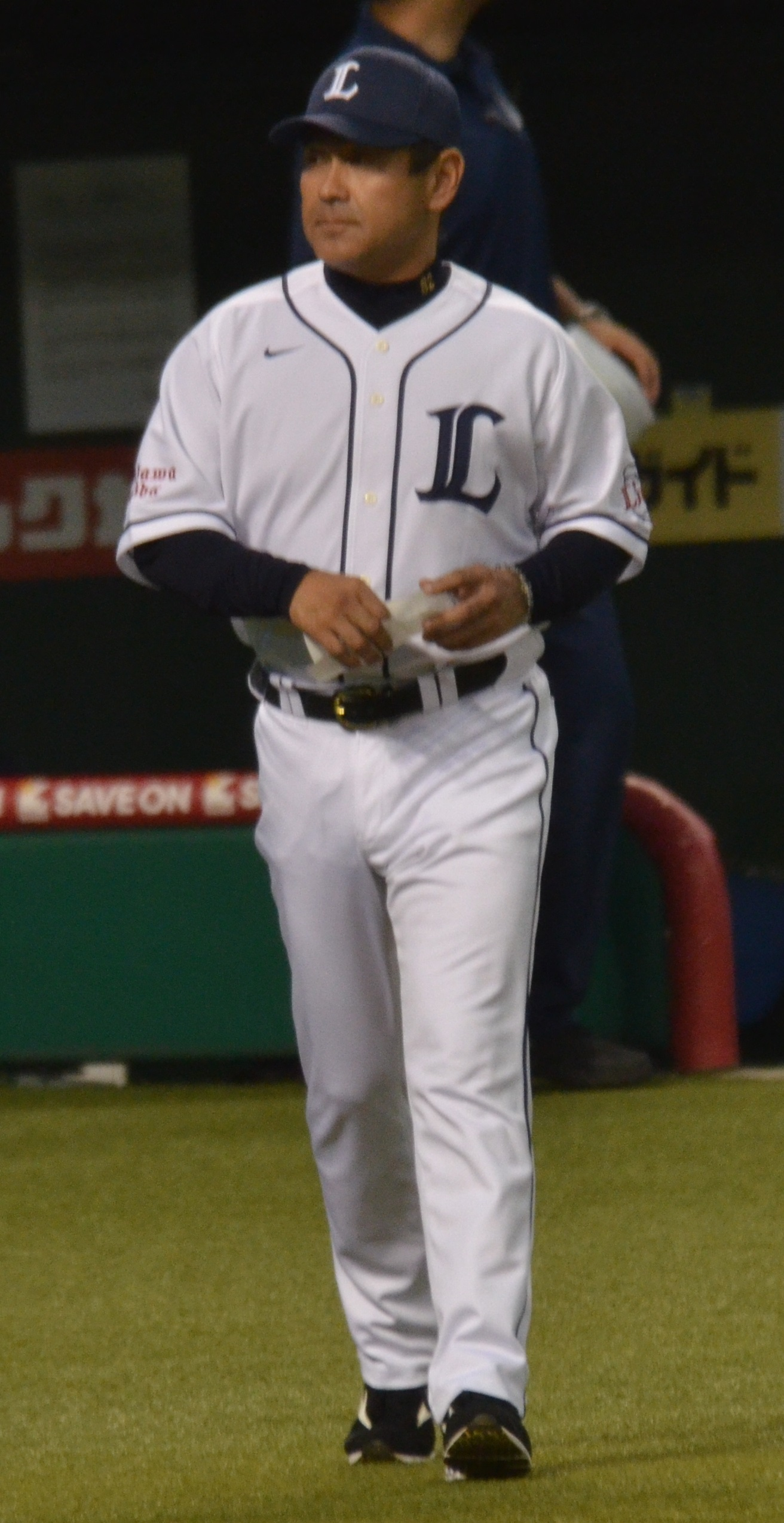
- Tanebe with the Saitama Seibu Lions

Saitama Seibu Lions – No. 76
- Infielder/Coach/Manager
- Born: May 11, 1966 (age 60); Yamanashi Prefecture, Japan
- Batted: Right Threw: Right

debut
- August 26, 1985, for the Seibu Lions

Last appearance
- June 11, 2000, for the Yomiuri Giants

Career statistics
- Batting average: .268
- Home runs: 87
- Hits: 926
- Stats at Baseball Reference

Teams
- As player: Seibu Lions (1985–1999); Yomiuri Giants (2000); As manager: Saitama Seibu Lions (2014–2016); As coach: Seibu Lions/Saitama Seibu Lions (2002–2009, 2010–2014, 2020-2022, 2025-); Hanwha Eagles (2017, 2019)

Career highlights and awards
- 2× Best Nine Award (1989, 1992); 2× Mitsui Golden Glove Award (1989, 1992); 2× NPB All-Star (1992, 1994); 7× Japan Series champion (1986, 1987, 1988, 1990, 1991, 1992, 2000)
- Last updated on: 16 November 2024

Norio Tanabe (田辺 徳雄, Tanabe Norio; born May 11, 1966 in Yamanashi, Japan) is a former Japanese Nippon Professional Baseball player. He played for the Seibu Lions and Yomiuri Giants.

In 1986, Tanabe was one of several Lions players who played on loan for the San Jose Bees. He led the club in hits, home runs, and runs batted in.

In 2002, Tanabe rejoined the Lions as a coach. He was serving as the club's hitting coach when he took over as manager in June 2014. On September 27, 2016, Tanabe announced he would resign at the end of the season.
