= 1986 Nippon Professional Baseball season =

1986 NPB season
- League: Nippon Professional Baseball
- Sport: Baseball

Regular season
- Season MVP: CL: Manabu Kitabeppu (HIR); PL: Hiromichi Ishige (SEI)

League postseason
- CL champions: Hiroshima Toyo Carp
- CL runners-up: Yomiuri Giants
- PL champions: Seibu Lions
- PL runners-up: Kintetsu Buffaloes

Japan Series
- Champions: Seibu Lions
- Runners-up: Hiroshima Toyo Carp
- Finals MVP: Kimiyasu Kudoh (SEI)

NPB seasons
- ← 1985 1987 →

The 1986 Nippon Professional Baseball season was the 37th season of operation for the league.

== Regular season standings ==
=== Central League ===
Central League	G	W	L	T	Pct.	GB
Hiroshima Toyo Carp	130	73	46	11	.613	–
Yomiuri Giants	130	75	48	7	.610	0.0
Hanshin Tigers	130	60	60	10	.500	13.5
Yokohama Taiyo Whales	130	56	69	5	.448	20.0
Chunichi Dragons	130	54	67	9	.446	20.0
Yakult Swallows	130	49	77	4	.389	27.5

=== Pacific League ===
Pacific League	G	W	L	T	Pct.	GB
Seibu Lions	130	68	49	13	.581	–
Kintetsu Buffaloes	130	66	52	12	.559	2.5
Hankyu Braves	130	63	57	10	.525	6.5
Lotte Orions	130	57	64	9	.471	13.0
Nippon-Ham Fighters	130	57	65	8	.467	13.5
Nankai Hawks	130	49	73	8	.402	21.5

== Japan Series ==
Seibu Lions won the series 4–3–1.

Game	Score	Date	Location	Attendance
1	Carp – 2, Lions – 2	October 18	Hiroshima Municipal Stadium	26,037
2	Carp – 2, Lions – 1	October 19	Hiroshima Municipal Stadium	26,652
3	Lions – 4, Carp – 7	October 21	Seibu Lions Stadium	31,769
4	Lions – 1, Carp – 3	October 22	Seibu Lions Stadium	32,136
5	Lions – 2, Carp – 1	October 23	Seibu Lions Stadium	32,395
6	Carp – 1, Lions – 3	October 25	Hiroshima Municipal Stadium	26,107
7	Carp – 1, Lions – 3	October 26	Hiroshima Municipal Stadium	26,101
8	Carp – 2, Lions – 3	October 27	Hiroshima Municipal Stadium	16,828

== See also ==
- 1986 Major League Baseball season
