= 1987 Japan Series =

Team (Wins)	Managers	Season
Seibu Lions (4)	Masaaki Mori	71–45–14 (.612), GA: 9
Yomiuri Giants (2)	Sadaharu Oh	76–43–11 (.639), GA: 8
- Dates: October 25 – November 1
- MVP: Kimiyasu Kudoh (Seibu)
- FSA: Kazunori Shinozuka (Yomiuri)

The 1987 Japan Series was the championship series of Nippon Professional Baseball (NPB) for the 1987 season. The 38th edition of the Series, it was a best-of-seven playoff that matched the Central League champion Yomiuri Giants against the Pacific League champion Seibu Lions. The Lions came into the series as the defending champions, having won the 1986 Japan Series. This was the Giants' 24th appearance in the Japan Series and first since 1983. The Lions defeated the Giants, 4 games to 2, and won their second championship in a row and seventh overall.

It was the first year the 18-inning limit was implemented for championships.

== Summary ==
Game	Score	Date	Location	Attendance
1	Lions – 3, Giants – 7	October 25	Seibu Lions Stadium	32,365
2	Lions – 6, Giants – 0	October 26	Seibu Lions Stadium	32,434
3	Giants – 1, Lions – 2	October 28	Korakuen Stadium	40,608
4	Giants – 4, Lions – 0	October 29	Korakuen Stadium	40,829
5	Giants – 1, Lions – 3	October 30	Korakuen Stadium	41,383
6	Lions – 3, Giants – 1	November 1	Seibu Lions Stadium	32,323

== See also ==
- 1987 World Series
