= 1994 Central League tie-breaker game =

- Teams: Yomiuri Giants; Chunichi Dragons
- Date: October 8, 1994
- Venue: Nagoya Stadium
- City: Nakagawa-ku Nagoya, Aichi Prefecture
- Umpires: Takeji Kobayashi, Tadayuki Inoue, Hiroshi Fukui, Fumio Yamamoto

The 1994 Central League tie-breaker game, more commonly known as the 10.8 deciding match in Japan, was a Nippon Professional Baseball (NPB) regular season game played between the Central League's (CL) Yomiuri Giants and the Chunichi Dragons. It was the final 130th regular season game for both the Giants and the Dragons that season, and both teams entered the game tied for first place in the CL with identical win–loss records of 69–60. The winner of the game decided who would be the league champion and the CL representative in the 1994 Japan Series.

The two teams had planned to play their final two games against each other in Nagoya on September 27 and 28, however rain forced the game first game to be rescheduled to the 29th. Rain again, however, forced the game to be postponed until October 8. The game marked the first time in Japanese baseball history that two teams of the same league were tied for first place with only one game remaining to be played against each other. It was played at Nagoya Stadium in Nagoya, Aichi Prefecture, on October 8, 1994. The Giants defeated the Dragons 6–3 and advanced to the Japan Series where they defeated the Seibu Lions.

In a 2010 survey of players, coaches, and managers, the game was ranked as the greatest game in history of Japanese professional baseball. It is also the highest rated baseball broadcast in Japanese TV history, with a household rating of 48.8.

== Game summary ==
Team	1	2	3	4	5	6	7	8	9	R	H	E
Yomiuri	0	2	1	2	1	0	0	0	0	6	12	3
Chunichi	0	2	0	0	0	1	0	0	0	3	11	0
WP: Masaki Saito (14–8) LP: Shinji Imanaka (13–9) Sv: Masumi Kuwata (1); Home runs: YOM: Hiromitsu Ochiai (15), Shinichi Murata (10), Henry Cotto (18), Hideki Matsui (20); CHU: None
