= Yoshiie =

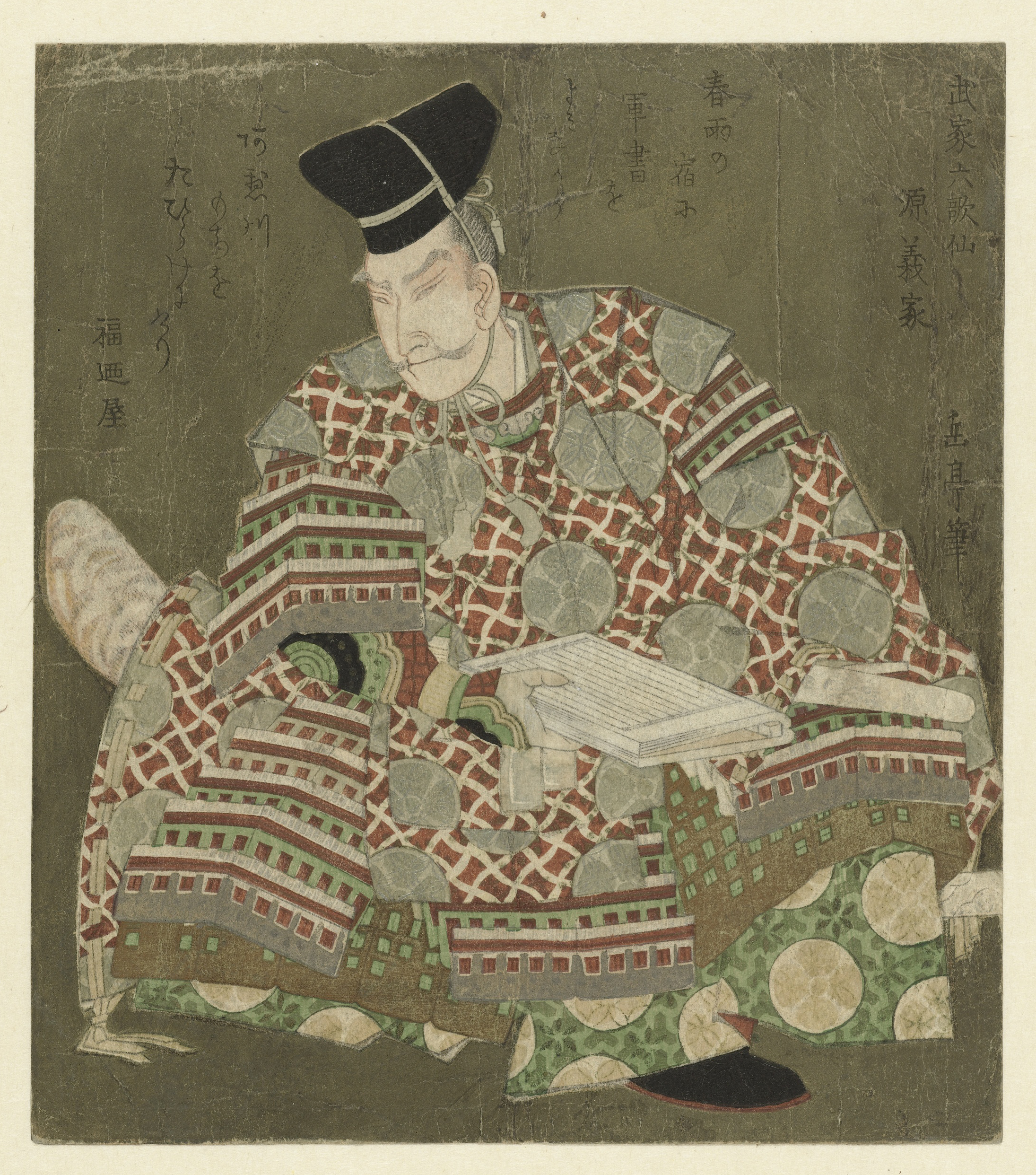
- Minamoto no Yoshiie (1039–1106), Japanese samurai
- Pronunciation: joɕiie (IPA)
- Gender: Male

Origin
- Origin: Japanese
- Meaning: Different meanings depending on the kanji used

Other names
- Alternative spelling: Yosiie (Kunrei-shiki) Yosiie (Nihon-shiki) Yoshiie (Hepburn)

Yoshiie is a masculine Japanese given name and surname.

== Written forms ==
Yoshiie can be written with various combinations of kanji characters. For example:

- 義家: "justice, house"
- 吉家: "good luck, house"
- 善家: "virtuous, house"
- 芳家: "virtuous/fragrant, house"
- 良家: "good, house"
- 喜家: "rejoice, house"
- 慶家: "congratulate, house"

The name can also be written in hiragana as よしいえ or in katakana as ヨシイエ.

== Notable people with the given name Yoshiie ==
- Minamoto no Yoshiie (源 義家) (1039–1106), Japanese samurai
- Yoshiie Tachibana (立花 義家, born 1958), Japanese baseball player and coach

== Notable people with the surname Yoshiie ==
- Hiroyuki Yoshiie (義家 弘介) (born 1971), Japanese politician
