= Haruki Ihara =

Japanese baseball player (born 1949)

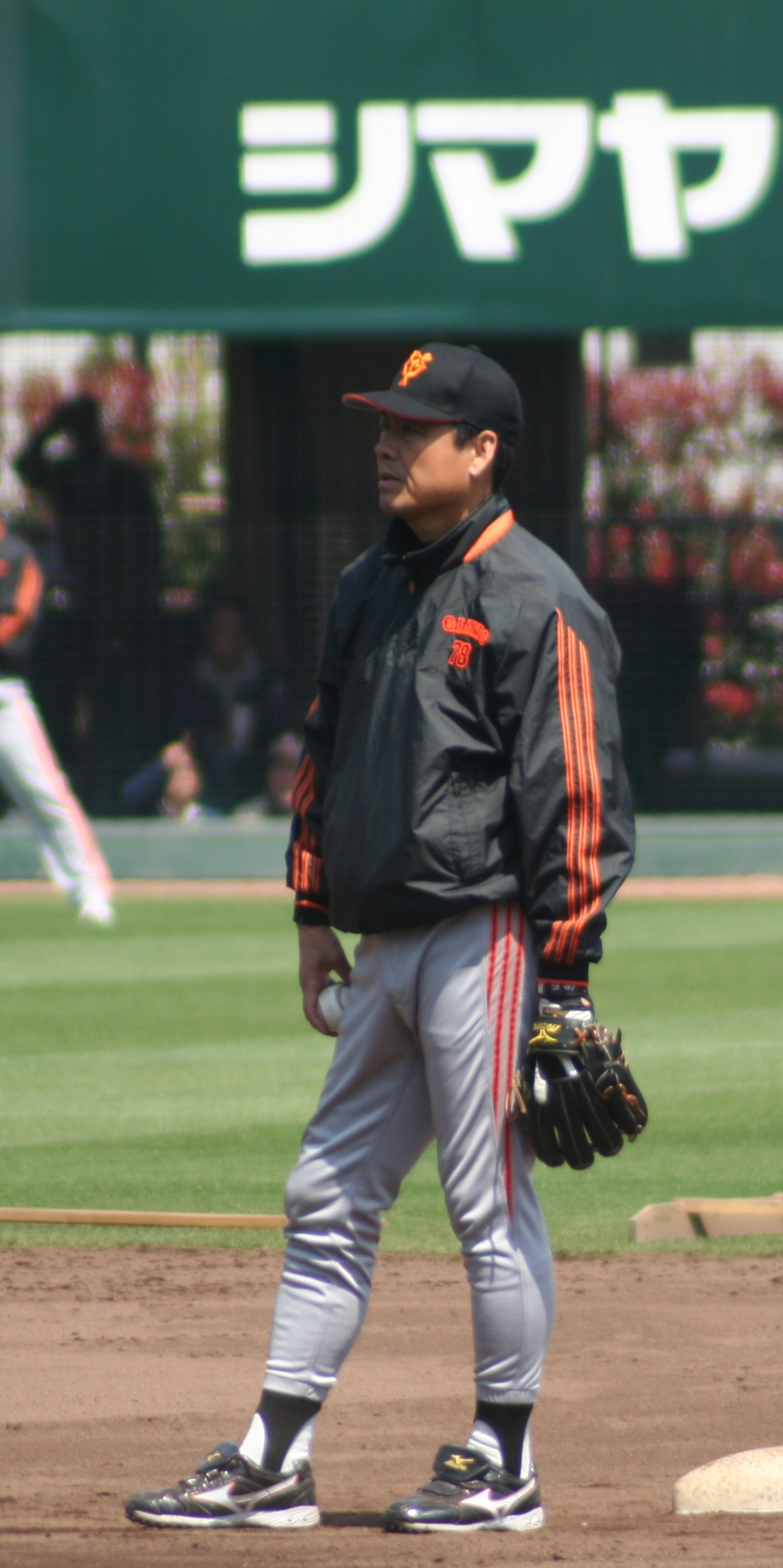
- Infielder / Manager /Coach
- Born: January 18, 1949 (age 77); Hiroshima Prefecture, Japan
- Batted: Right Threw: Right

debut
- July 4, 1971, for the Nishitetsu Lions

Last appearance
- 1980, for the Seibu Lions

Career statistics
- Batting average: .241
- Home runs: 12
- Hits: 189
- Stats at Baseball Reference

Teams
- As player: Nishitetsu Lions/Taiheiyo Club Lions (1971–1975); Yomiuri Giants (1976–1977); Crown Lighter Lions/Seibu Lions (1978–1980); As manager: Seibu Lions (2002–2003); Orix BlueWave (2004); Saitama Seibu Lions (2014); As coach: Seibu Lions (1981–1999); Hanshin Tigers (2000); Seibu Lions (2001); Yomiuri Giants (2007–2010)

Haruki Ihara (伊原 春樹, Ihara Haruki; born January 18, 1949) was a Japanese Nippon Professional Baseball player. He played for the Nishitetsu Lions, and continued his entire career with them.

From 2002 to 2003, he was the manager of the Seibu Lions, as well as the Orix BlueWave in 2004.

His daughter, Natsuna Ihara, is a model and actress.
