= Koichi Ogata (baseball, born September 1968) =

Japanese baseball player and coach (born 1968)

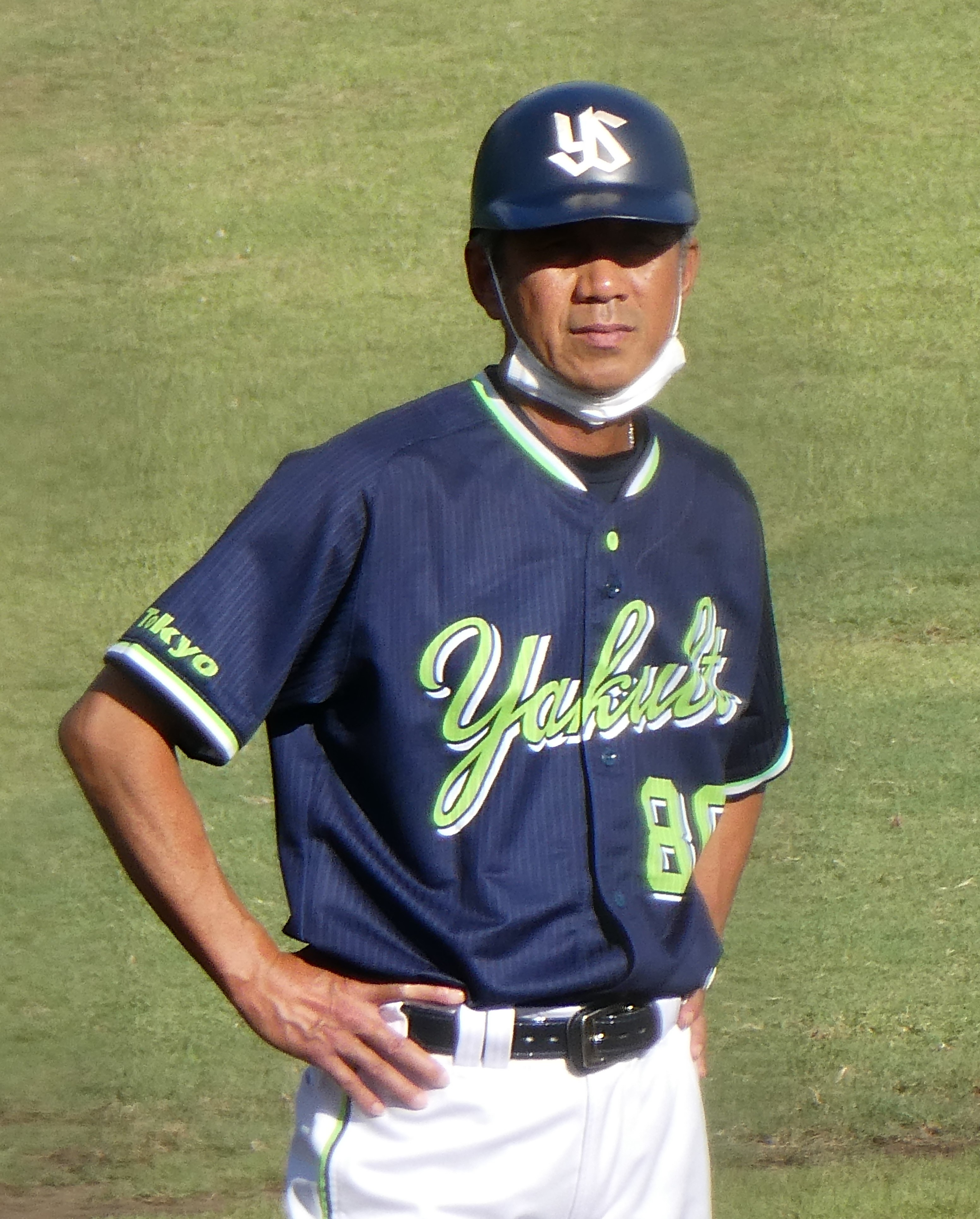
- Outfielder / Coach
- Born: September 2, 1968 (age 57); Kumamoto, Kumamoto, Japan
- Batted: Both Threw: Right

NPB debut
- May 13, 1989, for the Yomiuri Giants

Last appearance
- October 10, 1997, for the Yomiuri Giants

NPB statistics
- Batting average: .263
- Hits: 486
- Home runs: 17
- Runs batted in: 130
- Stolen base: 96

Teams
- As player: Yomiuri Giants (1987–1998); As coach: Yomiuri Giants (2002–2003, 2006–2010); Hokkaido Nippon-Ham Fighters (2018–2019); Tokyo Yakult Swallows (2020–2022)

Career highlights and awards
- 2× Central League stolen base champion (1990, 1993); 2× Japan Series champion (1989, 1994)
- Last updated on: November 23 2022

Koichi Ogata (緒方 耕一, Ogata Koichi; born September 2, 1968) is a Japanese former Nippon Professional Baseball outfielder.
