= Kazuo Matsui =

Japanese baseball player & coach (born 1975)

Kazuo Matsui 松井 稼頭央
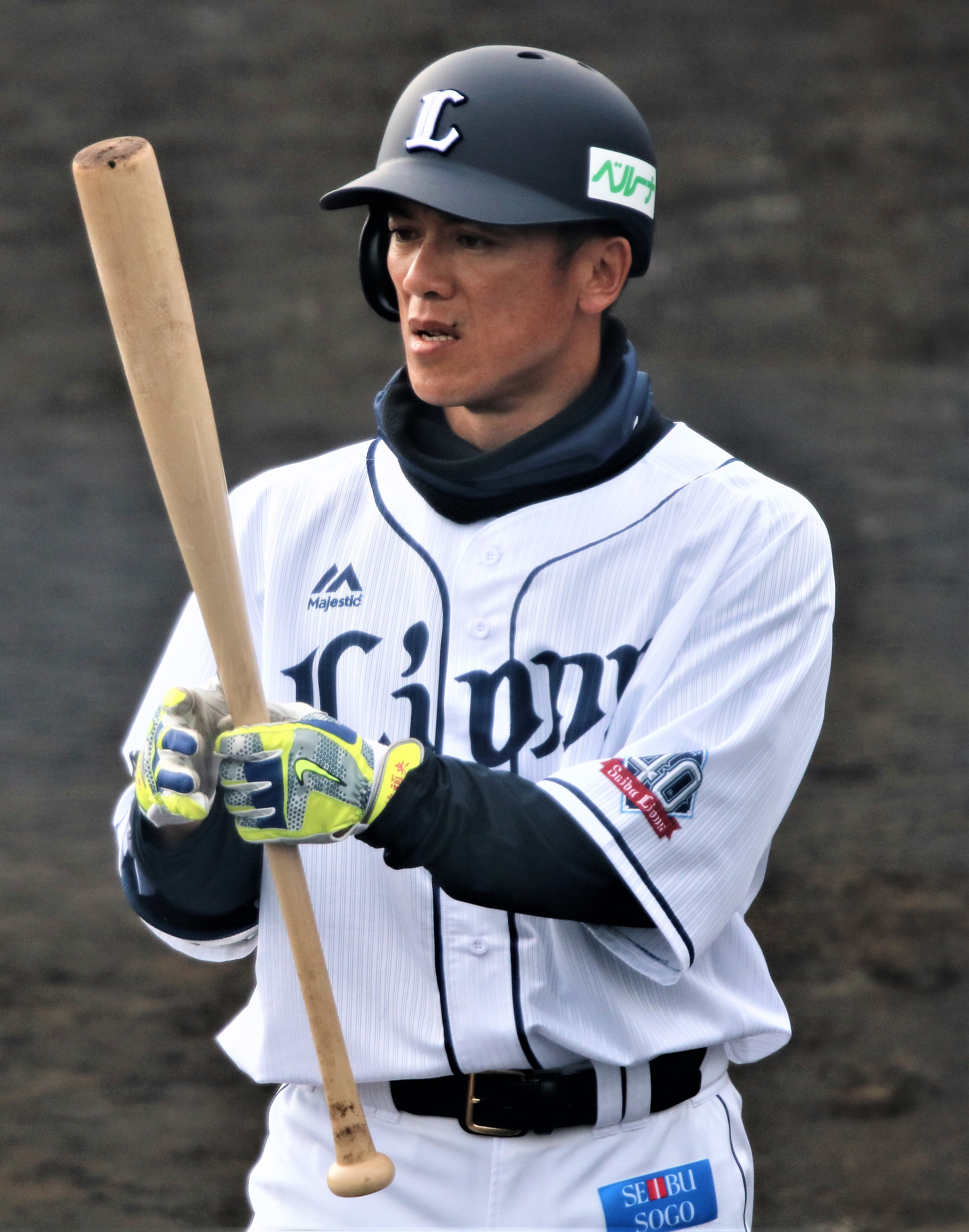
- Matsui with the Saitama Seibu Lions in 2018
- Infielder / Outfielder / Coach / Manager
- Born: October 23, 1975 (age 50); Higashiōsaka, Osaka, Japan
- Batted: Switch Threw: Right

Professional debut
- NPB: April 5, 1995, for the Seibu Lions
- MLB: April 6, 2004, for the New York Mets

Last appearance
- MLB: May 18, 2010, for the Houston Astros
- NPB: October 6, 2018, for the Saitama Seibu Lions

NPB statistics
- Batting average: .291
- Hits: 2,090
- Home runs: 201
- Runs batted in: 837
- Stolen bases: 363

MLB statistics
- Batting average: .267
- Hits: 615
- Home runs: 32
- Runs batted in: 211
- Stolen bases: 102
- Stats at Baseball Reference

Teams
- As player: Seibu Lions (1994–2003); New York Mets (2004–2006); Colorado Rockies (2006–2007); Houston Astros (2008–2010); Tohoku Rakuten Golden Eagles (2011–2017); Saitama Seibu Lions (2018); As coach: Saitama Seibu Lions (2018–2022); As Manager: Saitama Seibu Lions (2023–2024)

Career highlights and awards
- Homered on the first pitch of his MLB career; Homered in his first at bat for the first three seasons of his MLB career; 4× Mitsui Golden Glove Award (1997, 1998, 2002, 2003); 7× Best Nine Award at Shortstop (1997, 1998, 1999, 2000, 2001, 2002, 2003); 3× Pacific League Stolen Base Champion (1997, 1998, 1999); Japan Series champion (2013)
Medals
Men's baseball
Representing Japan
World Baseball Classic
Bronze medal – third place	2013 San Francisco	Team

Kazuo Matsui (松井 稼頭央, Matsui Kazuo; born October 23, 1975) is a Japanese former professional baseball player who played as a shortstop and is a former manager of the Saitama Seibu Lions. He is a switch-hitter.

Matsui signed with the New York Mets on December 17, 2003, becoming the first Japanese infielder to sign with a Major League Baseball team.

== Early life ==
He graduated from the PL Academy Senior High School in Osaka, a school nationally renowned for its baseball program. The only appearance Matsui made at the National High School Baseball Championship Tournament was in his second year at PL Academy. Though Matsui was considered to be the PL Academy's ace starting pitcher, injuries limited him to playing only in the quarter-final game, where he allowed two runs during 2 2/3 innings.

== Professional career ==
=== Seibu Lions ===
Matsui was chosen third overall by the Seibu Lions of Nippon Professional Baseball's Pacific League in the 1994 Japanese League Draft, where he would wear number 32. In 1996, his third season, he became a regular starter as a shortstop and finished the season second in stolen bases (50). Prior to the 1997 season, he would change his number to 7. The 1997 season saw him reach a .300 batting average for the first time and lead the league in stolen bases (62) to help his team win the Pacific League Title. During the 1997 All-Star Game he set a new All-Star Game record by stealing four bases and was chosen the game MVP. Matsui would lead the Pacific League in stolen bases for two more consecutive seasons.

Prior to joining MLB, Matsui would only play for the Seibu Lions, playing there from 1994 to 2003. He enjoyed success as a seven-time Best Nine award winner (1997–2003). One of his best years was 2002, when he had a .332 batting average with 36 home runs, 87 runs batted in, 193 hits, 119 runs, 46 doubles, 6 triples and 33 stolen bases. He received four Gold Glove awards while in Japan (equivalent of Rawlings Gold Glove Award in MLB) during the 1997, 1998, 2002 and 2003 seasons. He also won a Nippon Professional Baseball MVP award in Japan during the 1998 season. Although Matsui experienced winning the Pacific League Title a total of four times (1994, 1997, 1998, 2002), his team never won the Japanese Series.

=== New York Mets ===
With the Mets, Matsui hit home runs in his first plate appearance in each of the 2004, 2005, and 2006 seasons. According to the Elias Sports Bureau, he is the only Major League player to hit a home run in his first plate appearance of his first three seasons. The only other player to hit a home run in even his first at-bat of three consecutive seasons was Ken Griffey Jr. In 2004, Matsui homered on the first pitch from Russ Ortiz of the Atlanta Braves leading off the first inning, in 2005, on the sixth pitch from Paul Wilson of the Cincinnati Reds with one out in the first inning, and in 2006, on the fourth pitch from Jake Peavy of the San Diego Padres with no outs in the top of the third. The third home run is notable for being an inside-the-park home run. He slid into home as his former Met teammate Mike Piazza was blocking the plate.

Matsui played 114 games in 2004 and hit .272 with 125 hits, 32 doubles, 2 triples, 7 home runs, 44 runs batted in, 65 runs scored, 14 stolen bases, 5 sacrifice hits, 40 walks and 182 total bases. His hits, doubles, walks, and total bases ended up being career highs.

Based on his performance in Japan, Matsui was expected to excel defensively as a shortstop with the Mets. However, in 2004, Matsui committed many errors and misjudgments at the position, and was made the second baseman for 2005. He was also plagued by injuries, which were not a problem for him in Japan. His offensive production was also much lower than anticipated. By mid-2005, he was no longer an everyday player, sharing time at second base with Miguel Cairo and Marlon Anderson. Matsui finished the season batting .255 with three home runs and 24 runs batted in.

Matsui began the 2006 season by hitting .200 (26-for-130) with 10 runs, six doubles, one home run and seven runs batted in. The home run was an inside-the-park home run against the San Diego Padres on April 20, 2006. Matsui became the first player since 1975 to hit an inside-the-park home run as his first home run of the season.

=== Colorado Rockies ===
On June 9, 2006, Matsui was traded to the Colorado Rockies for Eli Marrero. Colorado asked Matsui to waive certain clauses in his contract to which he agreed. Once complete, Matsui was sent down to play with the Rockies' Triple-A affiliate, the Colorado Springs Sky Sox for about two and a half months. Matsui made his Rockies debut against the Milwaukee Brewers on August 23, 2006, starting at shortstop in place of Clint Barmes. Matsui would soon shift to second base. Through 2006 he improved from .200/.235/.269 (batting average/on-base percentage/slugging average) in his 130 at bats as a Met, to hitting .345/.392/.504 in 113 at bats as a member of the Rockies.

His stint in New York was punctuated with pronounced booing from Mets fans in response to his failure to validate high expectations gleaned from his (positionally) prodigious Japanese numbers.

Matsui re-signed with the Colorado Rockies for a one-year, $1.5M contract for 2007 and changed his number to 7, a number he wore in Japan.

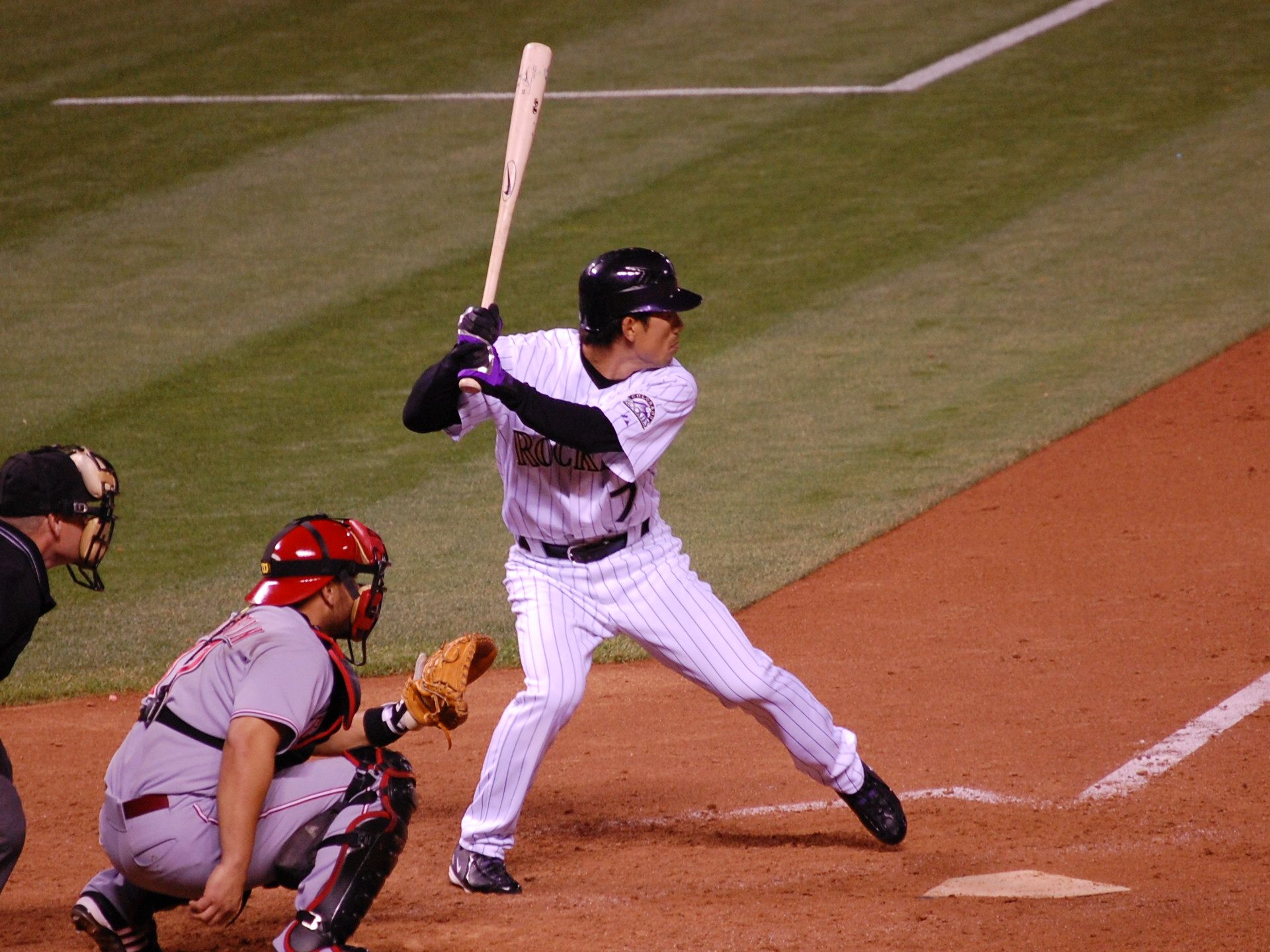
Kazuo Matsui batting for the Colorado Rockies against the Cincinnati Reds in 2007

Matsui's performance improved during the 2007 season with the Rockies, as he hit .288, which was higher than his career average. He had career highs in runs (84), triples (6), stolen bases (32) and sacrifice hits (8) in 2007. Matsui was also first in the majors in scoring percentage (47%) when reaching base.

Matsui and the Rockies advanced all the way to contention for the 2007 National League wild card spot, where they tied in wins (89) with the San Diego Padres. Matsui batted leadoff in the one-game regular season playoff matchup for the Rockies, leading the bottom of the inning off with a double that eventually saw him score the first run of a back-and-forth game that saw him drive in a run on a sacrifice fly. He went 2-for-6, with his last hit being in the 13th inning on a leadoff double off Trevor Hoffman as the Rockies trailed 8–6. Matsui scored on a subsequent double by Troy Tulowitzki before the Rockies won the game three batters later; the victory clinched the second playoff appearance in Rockies history.

Matsui hit his first career grand slam during the second game of the NLDS against the Philadelphia Phillies. It came with the Rockies down 3–2 with two outs in the top of the 4th inning. The grand slam gave the Rockies a lead in which they would never relinquish. Colorado won the game, 10–5. Matsui became only the third player in MLB history to have his first career grand slam occur in the postseason rather than the regular season. He also became the first Japanese player to hit a grand slam in the postseason. Along with the grand slam, Matsui hit a triple and a double during game two of the NLDS, falling a single short of becoming the only player in history to hit a cycle during the postseason. However, Matsui did become only the second player ever (Lou Brock in game four of the 1968 World Series was the first) to hit a double, triple and home run in a postseason game. In the 2007 World Series, he batted 5-for-17 with a stolen base while batting .294 as the Rockies were swept in four games. This would be the only MLB playoff appearance for Matsui.

=== Houston Astros ===
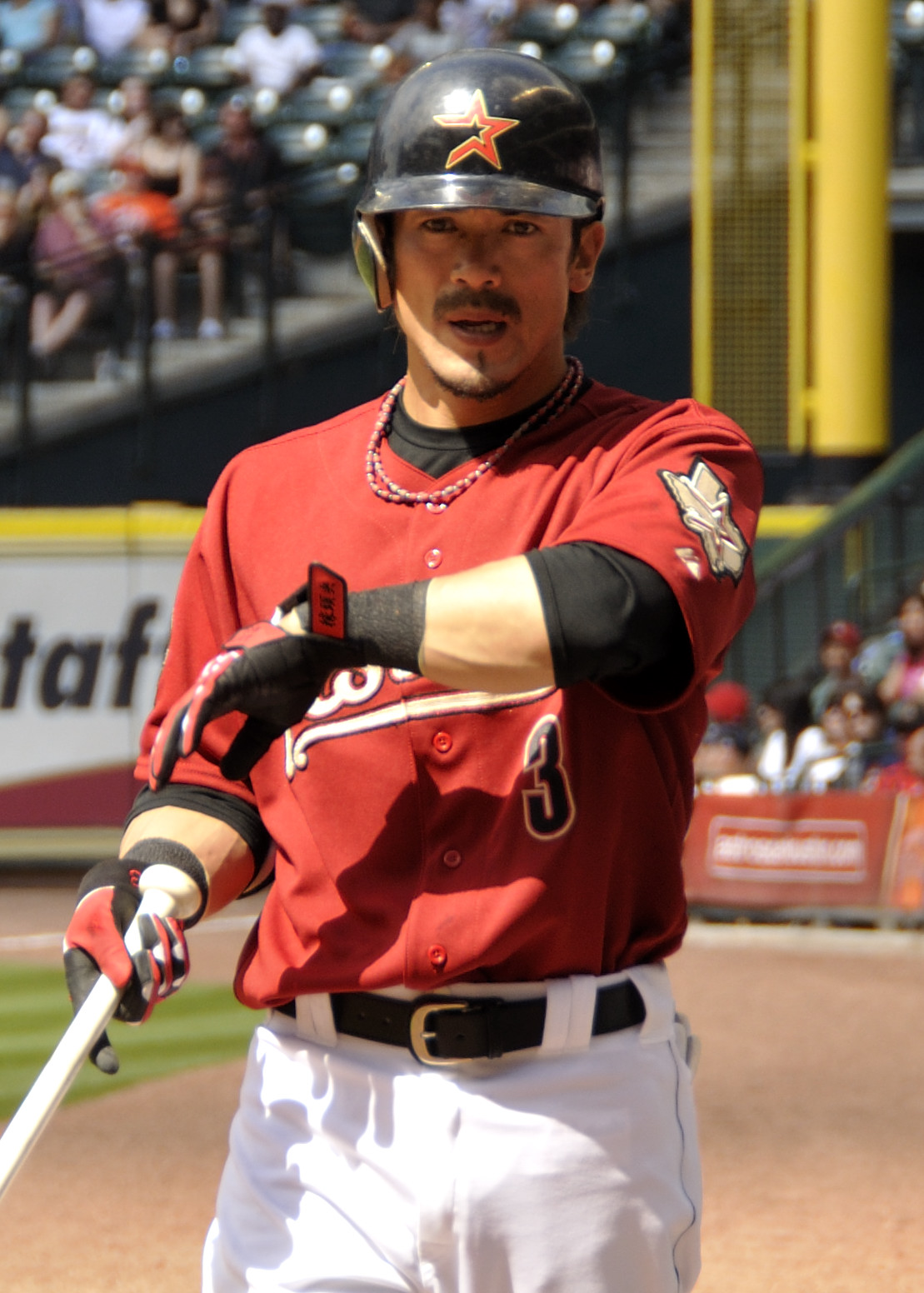
Matsui with the Astros in 2010

On December 1, 2007, Matsui signed a three-year, $16.5-million deal with the Houston Astros.

Prior to Opening Day, Matsui underwent surgery to repair an anal fissure. He missed the first 2 1/2 weeks of the season. Matsui made his 2008 debut for the Astros on April 18. He posted a .293 batting average and a .354 on-base percentage with 20 stolen bases on the season.

Matsui still had injury problems but managed to keep the second base starting position. He joined the list of baseball players with 2,000 hits or more lifetime. He has hit safely over 2,000 times in his Japanese career and in the MLB combined.

In 2009, he led all major league starting second basemen in range factor, at 5.33.

Matsui was released by the Houston Astros on May 19, 2010. In 71 at bats, Matsui managed only a .141 batting average with one run batted in and one stolen base.

=== Colorado Rockies (second stint) ===
Following his release he signed a minor league deal with the Colorado Rockies. He remained in the Rockies' minor league system for the remainder of the season.

=== Tohoku Rakuten Golden Eagles ===
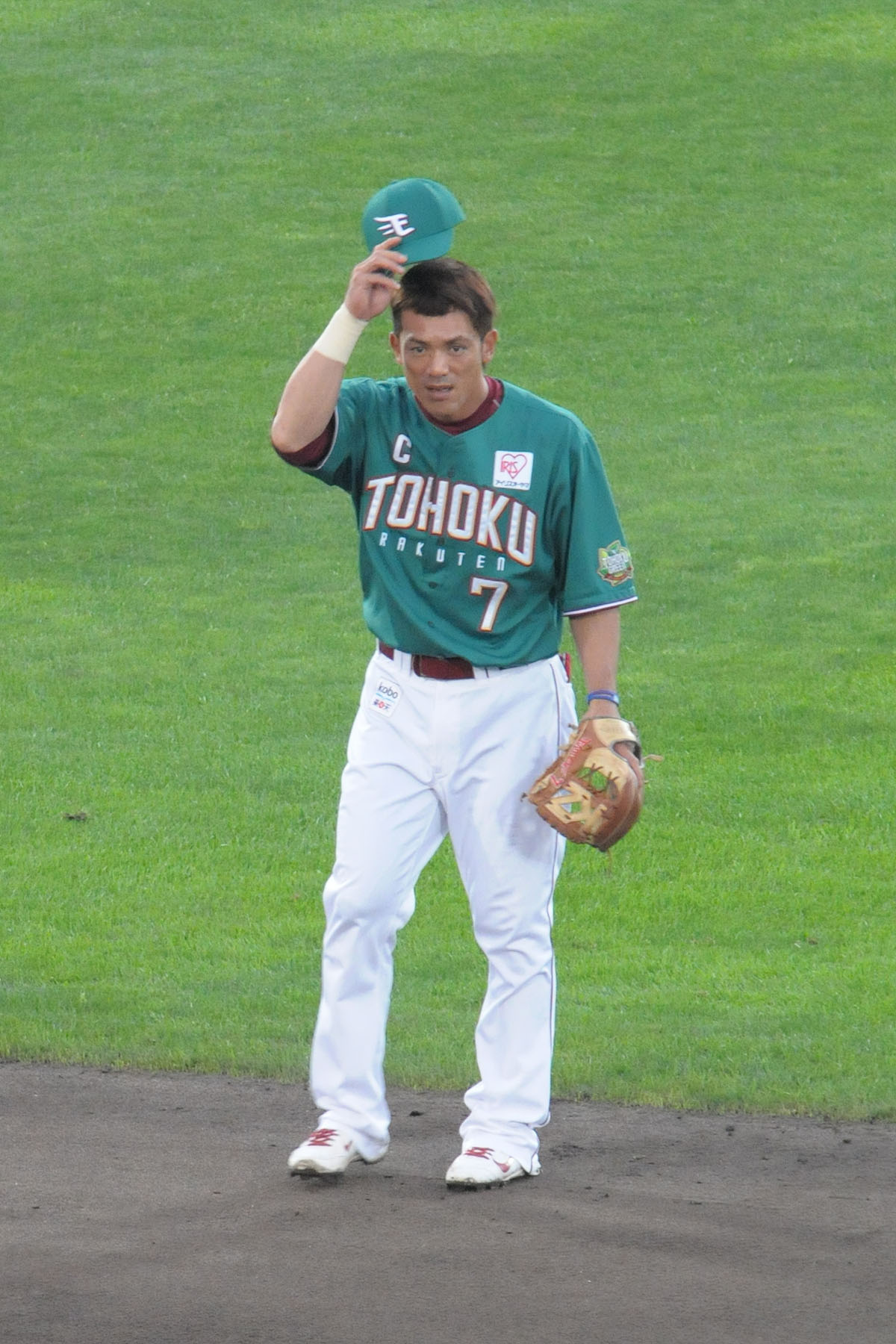
Matsui with the Tohoku Rakuten Golden Eagles in 2013

After the 2010 season, Matsui signed with the Tohoku Rakuten Golden Eagles of Nippon Professional Baseball (NPB).

Matsui would win the 2013 Japan Series with the Eagles organization.

=== Saitama Seibu Lions ===
On November 17, 2017, Matsui signed with the Saitama Seibu Lions of Nippon Professional Baseball (NPB).

On September 27, 2018, he announced his retirement at completion of the season.

== Coaching career ==
On October 13, 2022, Matsui was hired as the manager of the Saitama Seibu Lions, filling the role that was left vacant after Hatsuhiko Tsuji stepped down from the position.

== Career Statistics ==
=== Batting ===
Year	Team	G	AB	R	H	2B	3B	HR	RBI	SB	CS	BB	SO	BA	OBP	SLG	OPS
2004	New York Mets	114	460	65	125	32	2	7	44	14	3	40	97	.272	.331	.396	.727
2005	New York Mets	87	267	31	68	9	4	3	24	6	1	14	43	.255	.300	.352	.652
2006	New York Mets	38	130	10	26	6	0	1	7	2	0	6	19	.200	.235	.269	.504
2006	Colorado Rockies	32	113	22	39	6	3	2	19	8	1	10	27	.345	.392	.504	.896
2007	Colorado Rockies	104	410	84	118	24	6	4	37	32	4	34	69	.288	.342	.405	.747
2008	Houston Astros	96	375	58	110	26	3	6	33	20	5	37	53	.293	.354	.427	.781
2009	Houston Astros	132	476	56	119	20	2	9	46	19	3	34	85	.250	.302	.357	.659
2010	Houston Astros	27	71	4	10	1	0	0	1	1	1	4	10	.141	.197	.155	.352
MLB career (7 seasons)		630	2302	330	615	124	20	32	211	102	18	179	403	.267	.321	.380	.701

== International career ==
He was selected to the Japan national baseball team at the 2003 Asian Baseball Championship and 2013 World Baseball Classic.

== See also ==
- Home run in first major league at-bat
- List of Nippon Professional Baseball career hits leaders
