= Masaki Saito (baseball) =

Japanese baseball player and coach

Masaki Saito 斎藤 雅樹
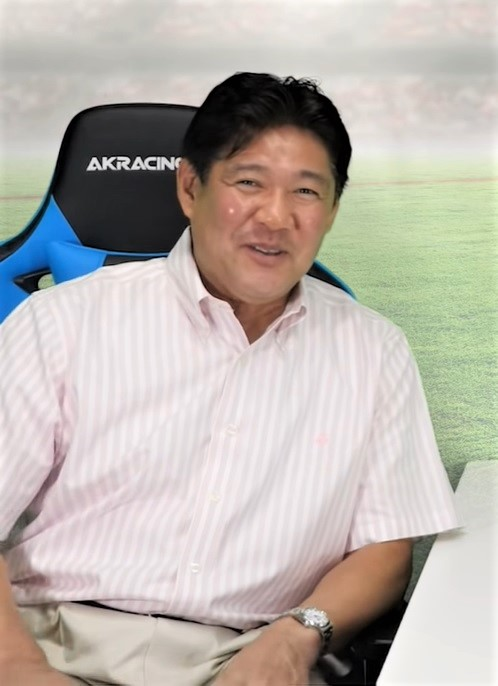
- Pitcher / Coach
- Born: February 18, 1965 (age 61); Kawaguchi, Saitama, Japan
- Batted: Right Threw: Right

NPB debut
- April 6, 1984, for the Yomiuri Giants

Last appearance
- September 30, 2001, for the Yomiuri Giants

NPB statistics (through 2001)
- Win–loss: 180–96
- ERA: 2.77
- Strikeouts: 1,707
- Stats at Baseball Reference

Teams
- As player: Yomiuri Giants (1983–2001); As coach: Yomiuri Giants (2002–2003, 2006–2018)

Career highlights and awards
- 3x Japan Series champion (1989, 1994, 2000); Central League MVP (1990); 3x Eiji Sawamura Award (1989, 1995, 1996); 5x Best Nine Award (1989, 1990, 1992, 1995, 1996)

Member of the Japanese

Baseball Hall of Fame
- Induction: 2016

Masaki Saito (斎藤 雅樹, Saitō Masaki; born February 18, 1965 in Kawaguchi, Saitama, Japan) is a Japanese former Nippon Professional Baseball pitcher. He played for the Yomiuri Giants from 1984 to 2001. He won the Eiji Sawamura Award three times, 1989, 1995, and 1996, and he won the Nippon Professional Baseball Most Valuable Player Award in 1990.

== Biography ==
Saito is often referred to as the "Great Ace of the Heisei" because he is considered one of the best pitchers during the Heisei era (1989-2019). He was also known as one of the "Three Pillars of the Giants," along with Hiromi Makihara and Masumi Kuwata from the late 1980s to the 1990s. In the famous "10.8 deciding match in Nagoya" of 1994, Manager Shigeo Nagashima had all three of them pitch.

He holds the NPB record for 11 consecutive complete game wins.
