= Yoshiie Tachibana =

Japanese baseball player and coach

Saitama Seibu Lions – No. 83
- Outfielder / Coach
- Born: October 27, 1958; Ōmuta, Fukuoka, Japan
- Batted: Left Threw: Left

Professional debut
- NPB: April 1, 1978, for the Crown Lighter Lions
- CPBL: March 12, 1993, for the Jungo Bears

Last appearance
- NPB: October 10, 1992, for the Hanshin Tigers
- CPBL: October 10, 1993, for the Jungo Bears

NPB statistics
- Batting average: .262
- Home runs: 51
- Runs batted in: 318

CPBL statistics
- Batting average: .295
- Home runs: 4
- Runs batted in: 29
- Stats at Baseball Reference

Teams
- As player: Crown Lighter Lions / Seibu Lions (1977–1990); Hanshin Tigers (1992); Jungo Bears (1993); As coach: Fukuoka Daiei Hawks (1998–2001); Orix Buffaloes (2002–2003); Seibu Lions (2004–2007); Fukuoka SoftBank Hawks (2009–2012, 2017–2021); Chiba Lotte Marines (2013–2016); Tohoku Rakuten Golden Eagles (2022); Saitama Seibu Lions (2025–present)

Yoshiie Tachibana (立花 義家, Tachibana Yoshiie; born October 27, 1958) is a Japanese former Nippon Professional Baseball outfielder.
