= Masaaki Mori (baseball) =

Japanese baseball player and manager (born 1937)

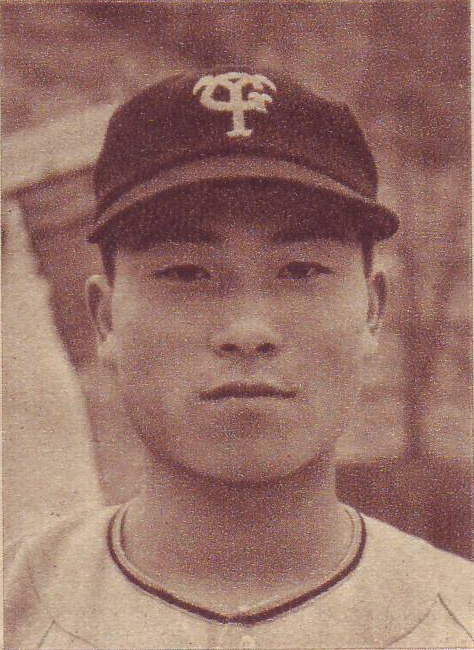
- Catcher / Manager
- Born: January 9, 1937 (age 89); Gifu, Gifu, Japan
- Batted: Left Threw: Right

NPB debut
- October 8, 1955, for the Yomiuri Giants

Last NPB appearance
- October 14, 1974, for the Yomiuri Giants

NPB statistics (through 1974)
- Batting average: .236
- Home runs: 81
- Hits: 1341
- Stats at Baseball Reference

Teams
- As player: Yomiuri Giants (1955–1974); As manager: Seibu Lions (1986–1994); Yokohama BayStars (2001–2002); As coach: Yakult Swallows (1978–1979); Seibu Lions (1982–1984)

Career highlights and awards
- As player: 11× NPB All-Star (1960–1970); 12x Japan Series champion (1955, 1961, 1963, 1965–1973; 8× Best Nine Award (1961–1968); Japan Series MVP (1967); As coach: 3x Japan Series champion (1978, 1982, 1983); As manager: 6x Japan Series champion (1986–1988, 1990‍–‍1992); 2× Matsutaro Shoriki Award (1986, 1990)

Member of the Japanese

Baseball Hall of Fame
- Induction: 2005

Masaaki Mori (森 祇晶, Mori Masaaki; born January 9, 1937) is a retired professional Japanese baseball player and manager.

Mori played Nippon Professional Baseball from 1955–1974 as the catcher of the Yomiuri Giants. He was an eight-time Best Nine Award-winner (1961–1968) and the Japan Series MVP in 1967. He was selected to eleven Nippon Professional Baseball All-Star Games. He was nicknamed "the brains of the V9 Dynasty", as he was the main catcher of the Yomiuri Giants V9 Dynasty. When his career ended in 1974, he asked newly-minted Giants manager Shigeo Nagashima for a job and was refused.

After his retirement as a player, Mori managed the Seibu Lions from 1986 to 1994, leading the team to six Japan Series championships of the Invincible Seibu dynasty. He won the Matsutaro Shoriki Award in 1986 and 1990. He announced his impeding retirement from the Lions at the close of the 1994 Japan Series, although it was later speculated that management expressed it was time for a change. Mori managed the Yokohama BayStars in 2001 to 2002.

Mori participated in 27 of the 73 Japan Series contested, as a player, coach, and manager, as of 2023, with him winning 21 of the 27, making him the most decorated individual in NPB history.
