= Kimiyasu Kudō =

Japanese baseball player and manager

Kimiyasu Kudo
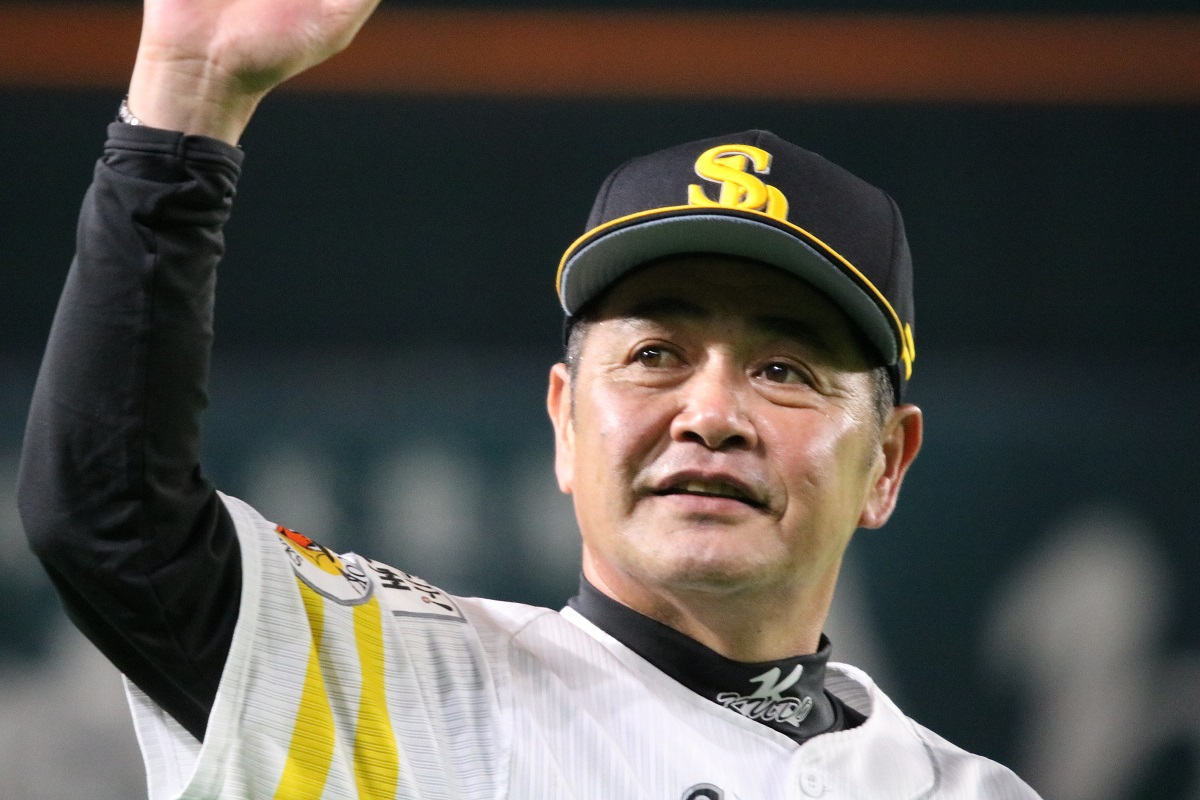
- Kudo with SoftBank

Chunichi Dragons – No. 81
- Pitcher / Manager
- Born: May 5, 1963 (age 63); Aichi, Japan
- Batted: Left Threw: Left

NPB Pacific League debut
- April 10, 1982, for the Seibu Lions

Last NPB Pacific League appearance
- August 25, 2010, for the Saitama Seibu Lions

NPB statistics
- Win–loss: 224–142
- Earned run average: 3.45
- Shutouts: 24
- Innings pitched: 3,336.2
- Strikeouts: 2,859
- Stats at Baseball Reference

Teams
- As player: Seibu Lions (1981–1994); Fukuoka Daiei Hawks (1995–1999); Yomiuri Giants (2000–2006); Yokohama BayStars (2007–2009); Saitama Seibu Lions (2010); As manager: Fukuoka SoftBank Hawks (2015–2021); Chunichi Dragons (2027–present)

Career highlights and awards
- As player: 10× All-Star (1986–1987, 1991, 1993, 1995, 1997, 1999–2000, 2004–2005); 11× Japan Series champion (1982–1983, 1986–1988, 1990–1992, 1999–2000, 2002); 2× Pacific League MVP (1993, 1999); 2× Japan Series MVP (1986–1987); 3× Best Nine (1987, 1993, 2000); 3× Gold Glove (1994–1995, 1999); 4× Pacific League ERA leader (1985, 1987, 1993, 1999); 2× Pacific League strikeout leader (1996, 1999); Matsutaro Shoriki Award (1987); As manager: 5× Japan Series champion (2015, 2017–2020); 4× Matsutaro Shoriki Award (2015, 2018, 2019, 2020)

Member of the Japanese

Baseball Hall of Fame
- Induction: 2016

Kimiyasu Kudo (工藤 公康, Kudō Kimiyasu; born May 5, 1963) is a Japanese former professional baseball pitcher, former manager of the Fukuoka SoftBank Hawks, and current manager of the Chunichi Dragons of Nippon Professional Baseball. Known for his longevity as a player, he holds the NPB records for longest career with 29 seasons played, most consecutive seasons with at least one win with 23 and is the oldest pitcher to strike out 10 batters in a game, doing so at the age of 41 years and 11 months. In his career, he recorded 224 wins, a 3.45 ERA and 2,859 strike outs. However, despite all his accolades, he is famously known for having never won the Eiji Sawamura Award, given to Japan's top pitcher.

Kudo has been a part of 16 Japan Series championships, 11 as a player and 5 as a manager. As a player, he was a member of the Seibu Lions Golden Age, winning 8 championships in 11 years, and won one championship with Fukuoka Daiei Hawks and two with Yomiuri Giants. As a manager, he led the Hawks to five Japan Series championships in six years, winning in 2015, 2017, 2018, 2019, and 2020. Kudo has won the Matsutaro Shoriki Award, given annually to the person who is deemed to have contributed the most to baseball in Japan, 4 times, once as a player in 1987 and 3 times as a manager in 2015, 2018 and 2019. He was also known as the last active player on the Lions from the "Invincible Seibu" era.

Kudo was born in Aichi Prefecture, Japan. For the English spelling of his last name, "Kudo" and "Kudoh" are used regularly and interchangeably. Technically, both are correct as there is no straight letter-for-letter translation because it is a series of Japanese characters. His preference for the spelling on the back of his uniform was "Kudoh" as a player and "Kudo" as a manager.

== Playing career ==
=== 1981-1994: Seibu Lions ===
==== 1981-84: Early years with Seibu ====
Kudo was a 6th-round pick in the 1980 draft, and signed a contract with the Lions when his father was given a job by team owner Yoshiaki Tsutsumi. He made his NPB debut with the parent club in 1981. He was used as a reliever in his first three seasons. The Lions were a strong club at the beginning of the Golden Age, and won the 1982 and 1983 Japan Series championships. Kudo made one appearance in each series. In game 6 of the 1982 Japan Series against the Chunichi Dragons, he pitched one inning and did not allow a run. The Lions defeated the Dragons in 5 games, 4–2. In game 2 of the 1983 Japan Series against the Yomiuri Giants, he pitched one inning, recorded one strikeout and gave up one run. The Lions defeated the Giants in 7 games, 4–3.

==== 1985-1987: Rise to fame ====
Kudo's breakout season was in 1985, when he earned a starting role and went 8–3, striking out 104 in 137 innings pitched. He won the Pacific League ERA title in his first year as a starter in NPB with a 2.76 ERA. At the 1985 Japan Series the Lions lost to the Hanshin Tigers in 6 games, 4–2. In game 1, Kudo came in relief with two runners on, pitched 1/3 inning and gave up a 3-run home run to Randy Bass and took the loss. He started game 3, pitched 3 innings and gave up 3 runs. In game 6, he came in relief, tossed 2 2/3 innings and gave up 1 run.

Kudo made his first All-Star team the next season in 1986. His wins total was 10, and his ERA was 3.22. In the 1986 Japan Series, the Lions defeated the Hiroshima Toyo Carp in 8 games. 4-3-1. In four appearances, Kudo went 1-1 and earned 2 saves with a 1.20 ERA in 15 innings to earn the Japan Series MVP. In game 2, he gave up 2 runs, and struck out 7 batters in 7 innings. The offense generated one run and he took the loss. In game 5, Kudo came in relief to begin the top of the 10th inning of a 1–1 tie game. He threw 3 innings, struck out 5, did not allow a run and earned the win when the Lions walked-off in the bottom of the 12th. In game 6, Kudo came in relief to start the seventh inning of a 2-run game. He threw 3 innings, struck out 5, did not allow a run and earned the save. In game 8, Kudo came in relief to begin the eighth inning with a 3–2 lead. He pitched the final 2 innings, did not allow a run and got the save.

In 1987, Kudo notched his first of three seasons with 15 or more wins (15-4, 2.41, 175 strikeouts). He tossed a career-high 223 2/3 innings, one of two times he crossed the 200-inning plateau. He won the ERA title and was an All-Star selection, but lost the Eiji Sawamura Award to Masumi Kuwata of the Yomiuri Giants (15-6, 2.17, 207 IP, 151 strikeouts).

In a matchup between the Giants and the Lions in the 1987 Japan Series, the Lions would come out on top in 6 games, 4–2. Kudo was named the Japan Series MVP for the second consecutive year after he gave up one run in 18 2/3 innings for a 0.48 ERA. In game 2, he earned the win with a complete-game shutout. In game 5, he got the save, coming in with one out in the ninth with a 3–1 lead. In game 6, Kudo threw his second complete game of the series, giving up 1 run, his only run of the series, and striking out 7 batters. After the season, Kudo was awarded the Matsutaro Shoriki Award, given annually to the person who is deemed to have contributed the most to baseball in Japan.

==== 1988–1990: Inconsistency and injury ====
For the next two years, Kudo posted mediocre records (10-10, 3.79 in 1988, 4–8, 4.96 in 1989). The 1989 season was the first time in his career that he had a losing record, and would not post another losing season until 1996. He rebounded in 1990 with a 9–2 record, but missed significant time due to injury. It was the first time since 1984 that Kudo failed to reach 100 innings. The Lions were still in the midst of their Golden Age and won the Japan Series in 1988 and 1990.

Kudo made one appearance in the 1988 Japan Series against the Chunichi Dragons. In game 3, he threw a complete game, gave up three runs, struck out four batters and earned the win. The Lions defeated the Dragons in 5 games, 4–1. Kudo made one appearance in the 1990 Japan Series against the Yomiuri Giants. In game 2, he pitched 3 1/3 innings, gave up 3 runs and struck out 3 batters. The Lions swept the Giants in 4 games, 4–0.

==== 1991-1994: Cementing greatness, missing Sawamura ====
Kudo posted a career-high in wins with 16, and got his ERA under 3.00 for the first time since 1987 (2.82). In 175 1/3 innings, Kudo struck out 151 batters. Despite his efforts, he ended up losing out to Shinji Sasaoka (17-9, 2.44, 240 IP, 213 strikeouts) of the Hiroshima Toyo Carp for the Sawamura Award.

The two aces would meet each other in the 1991 Japan Series, as the Lions defeated the Carp in 7 games, 4–3. In game 1, Kudo and Sasaoka went against each other, with Kudo coming out on top. He pitched a complete game, struck out seven batters and gave up three runs, only one earned, while Sasaoka went 2 2/3 innings and gave up 5 runs. In game 5, Kudo pitched 7 innings, struck out 4 batters and gave up 3 runs, but the Lions offense was shutout and he took the loss. In game 7, Kudo came in relief to start the top of the 5th and threw the final 5 innings of the series, striking out 4 batters and not allowing a run to earn the win. In the series, Kudo went 2–1 in 21 innings pitched with a 1.71 ERA and 15 strikeouts.

For the next three years, Kudo continued to pitch at a high level for Seibu. In 1992, he went 11–5 with a 3.52 ERA. He struck out 133 batters in 150 2/3 innings pitched. Kudo was hurt for the 1992 Japan Series against the Yakult Swallows, but made one appearance. In game 6, he pitched 2 1/3 innings, struck out 2 batters and gave up 2 runs. The Lions defeated Swallows in 7 games, 4–3, and won their 8th championship in 11 years.

Kudo was named the Pacific League MVP in 1993, going 15–3 with a 2.06 ERA and 130 strikeouts in 170 innings pitched. He lost out on the Sawamura Award, this time to Chunichi Dragons lefty Shinji Imanaka (17-7, 2.20, 249 IP, 247 strikeouts), despite having a lower ERA and fewer losses. In the 1993 Japan Series in a rematch against the Yakult Swallows, he made 3 appearances and gave up 4 runs in 6 2/3 innings pitched. The Swallows defeated the Lions in 7 games, 4–3.

In 1994, Kudo went 11–7 with a 3.44 ERA and 124 strikeouts in 130 2/3 innings pitched. The Sawamura Award went to Masahiro Yamamoto of the Chunichi Dragons who went 19–8 with a 3.49 ERA and 148 strikeouts in 214 innings pitched. Kudo received credit for his fielding and won his first Gold Glove. In the 1994 Japan Series against the Yomiuri Giants, Kudo made 2 appearances, pitched 12 1/3 innings, giving up 2 runs for a 1.46 ERA and struck out 10 batters. In game 2, he pitched 7 innings, gave up one run, none earned, and struck out 7 batters. Despite his performance, the Lions offense was shutout and he took the loss. In game 6, he pitched 5 1/3 innings, gave up 2 runs and struck out 3 batters. The Giants defeated the Lions in 6 games, 4–2.

Kudo's contract was up at the end of the 1994 season and he decided to depart after 13 years with the Lions.

=== 1995–1999: Fukuoka Daiei Hawks ===
==== 1995-1998: Rebuilding the Hawks ====
The Fukuoka Daiei Hawks had a history of being in the cellar of the Pacific League. In order to turn things around, the front office, led by team president Ryuzo Setoyama, adopted a strategy of signing veteran free agents from winning teams and using them to mentor younger players. Kudoh, who won 8 championships in 11 seasons with the Lions and was one of the top pitchers in NPB, fit the mold perfectly. He joined the Hawks, along with his fellow Lions teammates Koji Akiyama and Hiromichi Ishige, to bring a winning culture to the organization.

Even though the Hawks had been one of the worst teams in Japan for the better part of a decade, an incentive was that the legendary Yomiuri Giants slugger Sadaharu Oh was going to be the manager. Kudoh initiated a gradual turnaround by the long-hapless Daiei Hawks. He lowered his ERA in each season (3.64, 3.51, 3.35, 3.07, 2.38) and the Hawks became more competitive in each successive year by increasing their win total (54, 54, 63, 67).

In 1995, Kudoh was pegged as the team ace and he responded, going 12–5 with a 3.64 ERA. He also won his second gold glove. Kudo was victimized by awful run support in 1996. Despite lowering his ERA to 3.51, pitching 202 2/3 innings (the second-highest total in his career) and leading the Pacific League with 178 strikeouts, Kudoh lost the highest number of games in his career, going 8-15. Kudoh bounced back in 1997, going 11–6 with a 3.35 ERA in 161 1/3 innings, and was named an All-Star. In 1998, he went 7–4 with a 3.07 ERA.

==== 1999: Pacific League MVP, Japan Series Title and gold glove ====
The 1999 season for the Hawks culminated in a Japan Series title and ended the organization's long drought since 1964. The Hawks won the Pacific League with a 78-54-3 record, an 11-game win improvement from the previous season. Kudoh went 11–7 in 196.1 innings pitched and led the Pacific League in ERA (2.38) and strikeouts (196). He won his third gold glove and was named Pacific League MVP, but the coveted Sawamura Award went to Yomiuri Giants pitcher Koji Uehara (20-4, 2.09, 197.2 IP, 179 strikeouts), despite Kudo recording more strikeouts. As the team's ace, Kudo started the first game of the 1999 Japan Series against the Chunichi Dragons. He struck out 13 batters in a complete-game shutout and earned the win. He was not needed the rest of the way as the Dragons took game two, but the Hawks responded with the three consecutive wins to claim the title. Kudo's contract was up after the season and despite an inspired attempt to keep him, the Hawks could not retain him. Instead, he signed with the Yomiuri Giants, and was reunited with another former Seibu teammate, Kazuhiro Kiyohara.

=== 2000–2006: Yomiuri Giants ===
==== 2000-2002: 10th and 11th Championship ====
Showing that he had plenty of good pitching left in him, Kudoh continued his winning ways, even after moving to the non-DH Central League for the first time. Having never had to bat in his first 18 seasons as a pitcher, Kudoh infamously went 84 straight at-bats without recording a hit during his first season with Yomiuri. However, Kudoh showed that he was signed for his pitching and his big contract was worth it. He won 11 games and struck out 148 with a 3.11 ERA in 136 innings. He was named in the Best Nine Award, but the Sawamura Award was not awarded as the committee deemed that nobody was worth to win the coveted award. Up to that point, it had only happened 3 times in its history (1971, 1980, 1984).

The real attraction for Kudo in 2000 came when he ended up facing the team he had played for one year prior, the defending champion Fukuoka Daiei Hawks, in the 2000 Japan Series. Kudo only made one appearance in the series. In game 1, Kudo received a no decision after he threw 7 innings, gave up 3 runs and struck out 8 batters. The Giants won 4 straight games after losing the first 2 at Fukuoka Dome for Kudoh's 10th Japan Series victory.

The 2001 season was one to forget for Kudo as he posted career-worsts pretty much across the board. He missed significant time due to injury and ended the season with a 1–3 record and an 8.44 ERA. He also threw a career-low 21 1/3 innings.

After putting up with significant rehab time, the lefty rounded back into winning form in 2002. The workload he was originally going to be pegged with was greatly alleviated thanks to a rejuvenated Masumi Kuwata and continued production of hotshot youngster Koji Uehara, as the trio formed the front end of the Giants rotation. Despite coming back from injury, he threw 170 1/3 innings, his highest total since 1999. Also, for the first time since the 1999 season, Kudoh posted an ERA under 3.00 at 2.91.

Kudoh was part of a Japan Series-winning team for the 11th time in 2002. This time, he was on the other side the Giants-Lions rivalry as the Giants defeated the Lions in the Japan Series for the first time since 1994. In his only appearance, he got the start and earned the win in game 3, pitching 8 innings with 8 strikeouts and only giving up 2 runs. The Giants swept the Lions in 4 games.

==== 2003-2006: Final Years with Yomiuri ====
The 2002 season was the last time that Kudoh threw over 150 innings in his career and his ERA ballooned to 4.23 in 2003. From 2003 until 2005, he would see his ERA rise every year (4.67 in 2004, 4.70 in 2005). However, he did win at least 10 games in both years. His last season with Yomiuri in 2006 saw him once again miss significant time. He only made 13 appearances and finished 3–2 with a 4.50 ERA. His contract was not renewed by Yomiuri, but Kudoh still felt a desire to pitch.

=== 2007–2009: Yokohama BayStars ===
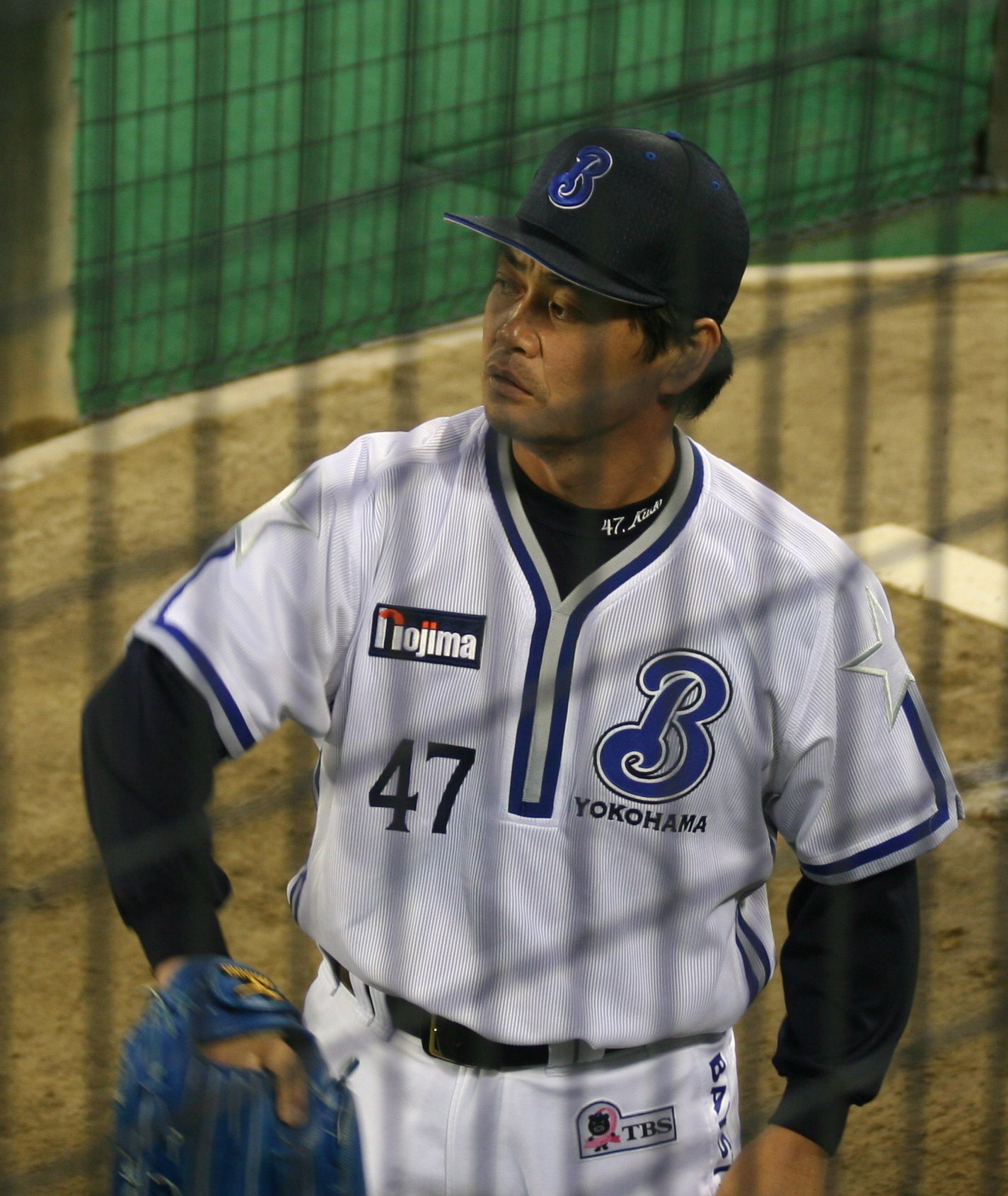
Kimiyasu with the Yokohama BayStars

Not yet satisfied to end his career, Kudoh would sign with the Yokohama BayStars. After pitching in domed stadiums from 1995 to 2006, Kudoh was pitching in the open-air Yokohama Stadium, the first time he had pitched outdoors regularly since his last days with Seibu in 1994. The 2007 season was the first and only time that Kudoh pitched over 100 innings with the BayStars. As the team's #5 starter, not much was expected of Kudoh, yet he still went 7–6 with a 3.91 ERA in 19 appearances with the 'Stars. He also won at least one game for the 23rd consecutive season, breaking Tetsuya Yoneda's previous record of 22 consecutive seasons with a win.

In 2008, despite off-season elbow surgery, Kudoh was still out to prove he had something left. However, he spent most of the season at ni-gun (Japanese minor leagues). He made a career-low 3 appearances and failed to record a win for the first time since 1984. However, he did set another record, becoming the longest-tenured player in Japanese baseball history with 27 seasons completed, breaking Katsuya Nomura's record of 26 seasons. A new personal best for appearances was in order for Kudoh in 2009, in what was also his final season with Yokohama and 28th overall. Used as a situational lefty, Kudoh did not have much success, as he went 2–3 with a 6.51 ERA and the cagey veteran also managed to strike out 24 batters in 37 1/3 innings.

=== 2010: Saitama Seibu Lions ===
Knowing that he did not have much left, Kudoh decided to return to where it all began for the 2010 season. Also in a career first for him, he did not take his signature #47, but instead took #55, as his number was taken by another Seibu lefty, Kazuyuki Hoashi. Kudoh had a small role in an injury-riddled Lions bullpen, but was ineffective again, as he went 0–2 with a 10.50 ERA in 10 appearances and just six innings, the last being on August 25. He did, however, extend his streak for the longest career in NPB history at 29 seasons. He was released at the end of the season.

After the season, Kudoh once again had surgery on his left shoulder and was nursing a calf injury. Despite all of that, he still expressed a desire pitch for a team. Kudoh was not signed and did not play in the 2011 season. He was courted by Yokohama to be a player-manager, but ended up not taking the job. He officially announced his retirement from baseball on December 9, 2011, at 48 years of age.

== Managing career ==
In 2015, Kudo was hired to be the manager of the Fukuoka SoftBank Hawks to succeed former Lions and Hawks teammate Koji Akiyama, who retired from the position after winning the 2014 Japan Series. In his first six seasons, he has managed the Hawks to five Japan Series titles in 2015, 2017, 2018, 2019 and 2020. Under Kudoh's stewardship, SoftBank won the title for the second consecutive season in 2015 over the Yakult Swallows. Outfielder Yuki Yanagita won the Pacific League MVP and the batting title. It also marked the first time since the Seibu Lions won three in a row from 1990 to 1992, the teams that Kudoh was also a member of, that an organization had won consecutive Japan Series championships.

After falling to the Hokkaido Nippon Ham Fighters in the 2016 Pacific League Climax Series, the Hawks won the 2017 Japan Series in six games over the Yokohama DeNA BayStars, in a series where the Hawks led 3–0, but were almost pushed to a 7th game. The following year the Hawks also won the 2018 Japan Series against the Hiroshima Carp in six games, making it back-to-back titles for a 2nd time, and four out of the last five; the next year, they became the first team to win three straight Japan Series titles since the Seibu Lions did it from 1990 to 1992, the teams that Kudoh was also a member of, by sweeping the Yomiuri Giants. 2021 would be Kudo's last season managing the Hawks, going for a 60-62-21 record, the first time since 2013 the Hawks failed to qualify for the playoffs, and first time since 2008 the Hawks failed to maintain a .500 winning percentage season. Kudo would be replaced by former Nankai Hawks player Hiroshi Fujimoto for the upcoming 2022 season.

== Pitching style ==
With a high three-quarters delivery, Kudoh was known for hiding the ball until release. While not known as a prolific strikeout pitcher, he was capable of reliably getting batters out with soft contact.

Standing at 176 cm or 5'9" and weighing 80 kg or 176 lbs., Kudo was never known for overpowering pitches, even in his prime, as he topped out at 148 km/h or 92 mph. Kudoh instead relied on pinpoint control on his straight (four-seam) fastball and an array of breaking pitches. Among his repertoire of breaking pitches were a late-breaking curveball, a slider, and occasionally he threw a sinker/shuuto.

Kudoh had his share of injuries, but the vast majority of them came late in his career, including endoscopic elbow surgery in 2008. By this time, he had already lost most of the velocity on his fastball and had to rely on veteran savvy and guile to get batters out.

== Personal life ==
His son is Asuka Kudoh, a Japanese actor.

== See also ==
- List of top Nippon Professional Baseball strikeout pitchers
