= Hatsuhiko Tsuji =

Japanese baseball player (born 1958)

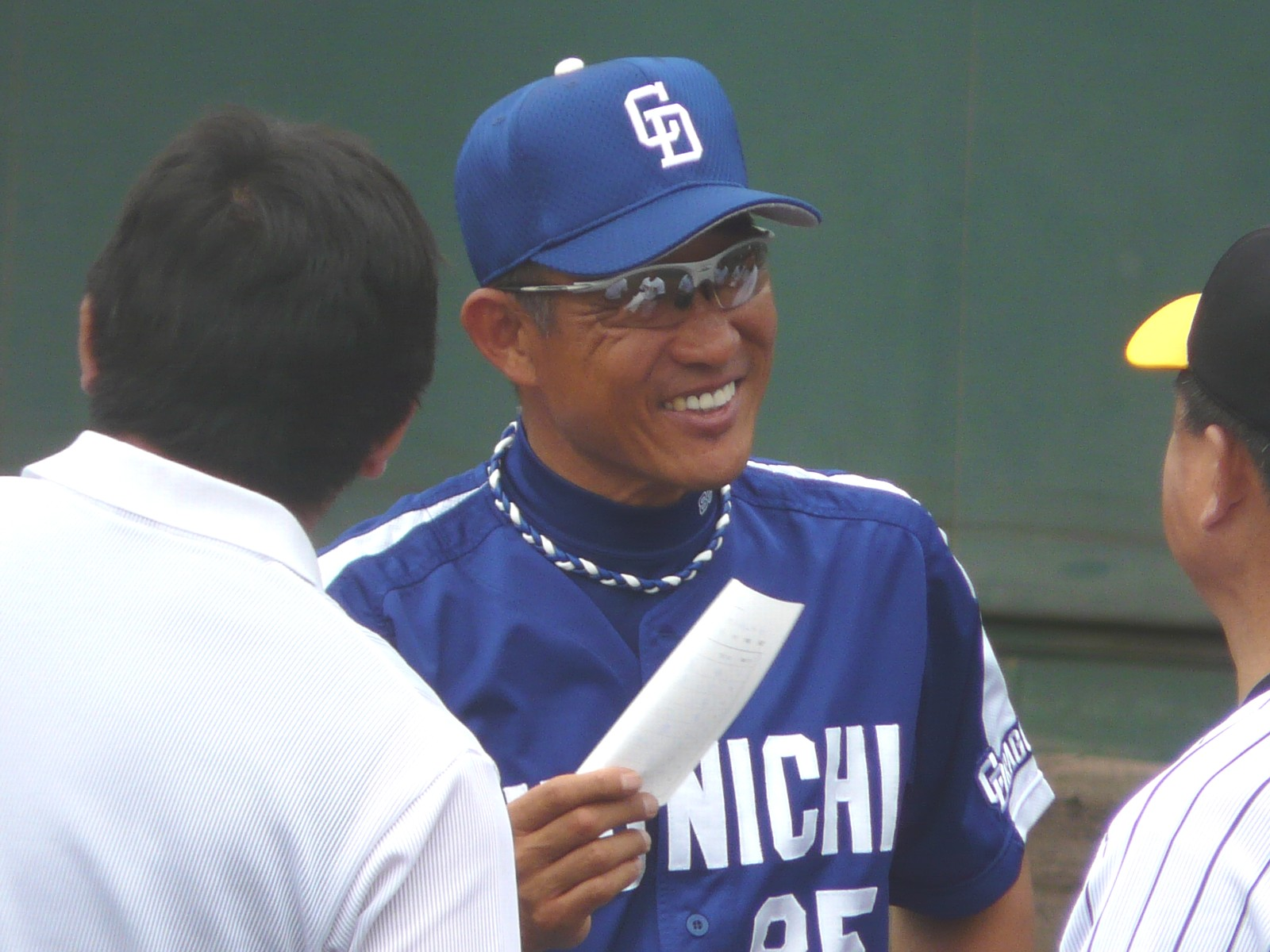
- Infielder / Manager
- Born: October 24, 1958 (age 67)
- Batted: Right Threw: Right

NPB debut
- April 3, 1984, for the Seibu Lions

Last appearance
- October 14, 1999, for the Yakult Swallows

NPB statistics (through 1999 season)
- Batting average: .282
- Hits: 1462
- Home runs: 56
- RBIs: 510
- Stolen bases: 242
- Stats at Baseball Reference

Teams
- As player: Seibu Lions (1984–1995); Yakult Swallows (1996–1999); As manager: Saitama Seibu Lions (2017–2022); As coach: Yakult Swallows (2000–2001); Yokohama BayStars (2002–2003); Chunichi Dragons (2004–2011, 2014 – 2016)

Career highlights and awards
- 9× NPB All-Star (1986, 1988–1994, 1996); 5× Best Nine Award (1986, 1989, 1991–1993); 8× Golden Glove Award (1986, 1988–1994); Pacific League batting champion (1993)

Hatsuhiko Tsuji (Japanese: 辻 発彦, Hepburn: Tsuji Hatsuhiko; born October 24, 1958) is a former Nippon Professional Baseball player and manager. During his playing career he was well known as a skillful second baseman.

== Career ==
After spending six seasons as the manager of the Saitama Seibu Lions, Tsuji stepped down from his position on October 9, 2022, with Kazuo Matsui filling the vacant role.

== Career statistics ==
- Bolded figures are League-leading

| Year | Team | Number | G | AB | R | H | 2B | 3B | HR | RBI | SB | SB | SF | BB +HBP | SO | BA (Place) |
|---|---|---|---|---|---|---|---|---|---|---|---|---|---|---|---|---|
| 1984 | Seibu Lions | 5 | 41 | 91 | 13 | 19 | 5 | 0 | 3 | 10 | 2 | 6 | 0 | 11 | 13 | .209 |
| 1985 | Seibu Lions | 5 | 110 | 251 | 45 | 69 | 11 | 4 | 5 | 35 | 27 | 15 | 5 | 39 | 26 | .275 |
| 1986 | Seibu Lions | 5 | **130** | 425 | 65 | 126 | 19 | 5 | 7 | 57 | 35 | 23 | 5 | 44 | 63 | .296 (13) |
| 1987 | Seibu Lions | 5 | 51 | 125 | 9 | 25 | 5 | 1 | 2 | 9 | 10 | 4 | 0 | 7 | 21 | .200 |
| 1988 | Seibu Lions | 5 | **130** | 419 | 45 | 110 | 19 | 1 | 3 | 39 | 13 | 9 | 1 | 31 | 51 | .263 (23) |
| 1989 | Seibu Lions | 5 | **130** | 437 | 58 | 133 | 12 | 5 | 3 | 52 | 33 | 9 | 5 | 39 | 33 | .304 (7) |
| 1990 | Seibu Lions | 5 | **130** | 421 | 59 | 112 | 17 | 2 | 3 | 39 | 31 | 22 | 2 | 53 | 38 | .266 (22) |
| 1991 | Seibu Lions | 5 | 129 | 498 | 61 | 135 | 27 | 2 | 8 | 43 | 16 | 20 | 2 | 51 | 48 | .271 (14) |
| 1992 | Seibu Lions | 5 | 123 | 474 | 66 | 135 | 23 | 4 | 6 | 48 | 23 | 11 | 1 | 67 | 38 | .285 (14) |
| 1993 | Seibu Lions | 5 | 110 | 429 | 68 | 137 | 26 | 5 | 3 | 31 | 14 | 10 | 5 | 57 | 37 | **.319 (1)** |
| 1994 | Seibu Lions | 5 | 105 | 412 | 63 | 121 | 21 | 1 | 4 | 45 | 9 | 2 | 5 | 39 | 51 | .294 (8) |
| 1995 | Seibu Lions | 5 | 107 | 307 | 31 | 73 | 8 | 2 | 2 | 20 | 7 | 13 | 1 | 49 | 30 | .238 |
| 1996 | Yakult Swallows | 8 | 103 | 400 | 59 | 133 | 9 | 2 | 2 | 41 | 9 | 1 | 2 | 53 | 46 | .333 (2) |
| 1997 | Yakult Swallows | 8 | 85 | 279 | 33 | 73 | 10 | 1 | 2 | 18 | 6 | 6 | 1 | 22 | 37 | .262 |
| 1998 | Yakult Swallows | 8 | 61 | 168 | 20 | 51 | 5 | 0 | 3 | 18 | 6 | 0 | 2 | 12 | 17 | .304 |
| 1999 | Yakult Swallows | 8 | 17 | 51 | 4 | 10 | 0 | 0 | 0 | 5 | 1 | 1 | 0 | 6 | 7 | .196 |
| Career Total | | | 1562 | 5187 | 699 | 1462 | 217 | 35 | 56 | 510 | 242 | 152 | 37 | 580 | 556 | .282 |

== Titles and awards ==
- Batting Champion: Once (1993)
- On-Base Percentage Champion: Once (1993)
- Mitsui Golden Glove Award: 8 times (1996, 1998–1994)
- Best Nine Award: 5 times (1986, 1989, 1991–1993)
- NPB All-Star appearances: 9 times (1986, 1988–1994, 1996)
