= 1986 Japan Series =

Team (Wins)	Managers	Season
Seibu Lions (4)	Masaaki Mori	68–49–13 (.613), GA: 0
Hiroshima Toyo Carp (3)	Junro Anan	73–46–11 (.581), GA: 2½
- Dates: October 18–27
- MVP: Kimiyasu Kudoh (Seibu)
- FSA: Mitsuo Tatsukawa (Hiroshima)

The 1986 Japan Series was the championship series of Nippon Professional Baseball (NPB) for the 1986 season. The 37th edition of the Series, it was a best-of-seven playoff that matched the Central League champion Hiroshima Toyo Carp against the Pacific League champion Seibu Lions. The Carp won the pennant in narrow fashion, having won two games less than the Yomiuri Giants but having four more tie games than them to pull out ahead.

The series is notable for being the only time to date in Japan Series history that an eighth game was played. After the first game ended in a tie, the Carp won the next three games. However, the Lions would respond by winning the next four in a row, reverse sweeping the Carp to capture their sixth Japan Series championship and their third title in five years. It was the first time a team had forced a deciding game after being down 3-0 since 1976 and it was the first successful 3-0 comeback by a team since 1958.

== Summary ==
PL Seibu Lions (4) vs. CL Hiroshima Toyo Carp (3)

Game	Date	Score	Location	Time	Attendance
1	October 18	Seibu Lions – 2, Hiroshima Toyo Carp – 2 (14 innings)	Hiroshima Municipal Stadium	4:32	26,037
2	October 19	Seibu Lions – 1, Hiroshima Toyo Carp – 2	Hiroshima Municipal Stadium	2:44	26,652
3	October 21	Hiroshima Toyo Carp – 7, Seibu Lions – 4	Seibu Lions Stadium	3:10	31,769
4	October 22	Hiroshima Toyo Carp – 3, Seibu Lions – 1	Seibu Lions Stadium	3:22	32,136
5	October 23	Seibu Lions – 2, Hiroshima Toyo Carp – 1 (12 innings)	Seibu Lions Stadium	3:42	32,395
6	October 25	Seibu Lions – 3, Hiroshima Toyo Carp – 1	Hiroshima Municipal Stadium	2:39	26,107
7	October 26	Seibu Lions – 3, Hiroshima Toyo Carp – 1	Hiroshima Municipal Stadium	2:55	26,101
8	October 27	Seibu Lions – 3, Hiroshima Toyo Carp 2	Hiroshima Municipal Stadium	2:46	16,828

NOTE: Game 1 was played to the 4:30:00 time limit. The time limit was reached in the 14th inning.

== See also ==
- 1986 World Series
