= Saitama Seibu Lions =

Nippon Professional Baseball team in the Pacific League

- 埼玉西武ライオンズ

Logo	Cap insignia

Information
- League: Nippon Professional Baseball Pacific League (1950–present)
- Location: Tokorozawa, Saitama, Japan
- Ballpark: Belluna Dome
- Founded: November 26, 1949; 76 years ago
- Nickname(s): Shishi (獅子, lion)
- Japan Series championships: 13 (1956, 1957, 1958, 1982, 1983, 1986, 1987, 1988, 1990, 1991, 1992, 2004, 2008)
- PL pennants: 23 (1954, 1956, 1957, 1958, 1963, 1982, 1983, 1985, 1986, 1987, 1988, 1990, 1991, 1992, 1993, 1994, 1997, 1998, 2002, 2004, 2008, 2018, 2019)
- Playoff berths: 14 (1982, 2004, 2005, 2006, 2008, 2010, 2011, 2012, 2013, 2017, 2018, 2019, 2022, 2026)
- Former name: Seibu Lions (1979–2007); Crown Lighter Lions (1977–1978); Taiheiyo Club Lions (1973–1976); Nishitetsu Lions (1951–1972); Nishitetsu Clippers (1950)
- Former ballpark: Heiwadai Stadium (1950–1978)
- Colors: Legend Blue, Lions Blue, Black, Red, White
- Mascot: Leo and Lina
- Retired numbers: 24
- Ownership: Takashi Goto
- Management: Seibu Railway
- Manager: Fumiya Nishiguchi

Current uniforms

The Saitama Seibu Lions (埼玉西武ライオンズ, Saitama Seibu Raionzu) are a professional baseball team in Japan's Pacific League based north of Tokyo in Tokorozawa, Saitama Prefecture. Before 1979, they were based in Fukuoka, Fukuoka Prefecture, in Kyushu. The team is owned by a subsidiary of Seibu Railway, which in turn is owned by the Seibu Holdings. The team experienced a recent period of financial difficulty, but the situation brightened when the team received a record ¥6 billion (about $51.11 million) posting fee from the Boston Red Sox for the right to negotiate a contract with Daisuke Matsuzaka. Between 1978 and 2008, the team logo and mascot were based on the adult version of Kimba the White Lion, a classic Japanese anime and manga series by Osamu Tezuka. (Note: Although many fans, team officials, and members of the press consider the mascot to be a variation of Kimba, Tezuka has stated that it is based on Panja (Caesar), the father of Kimba.) (Note: The Lions adopted a new mascot for the 2009 season.) In 2004, former Seibu Lions player Kazuo Matsui became the first Japanese infielder to play in Major League Baseball.

Through 2026, the franchise's all-time record is 5,265–4,756–401 (.525). The team's current manager is Fumiya Nishiguchi.

== Franchise history ==
=== Nishitetsu Clippers (1950) ===
In 1950, the team became a founding member of the Pacific League. It was then owned by a private railroad company Nishi-Nippon Railroad, well known as "Nishitetsu", which was based in Fukuoka in Kyushu, the western area of Japan (Nishi-Nippon). The Clippers name was chosen as Nishitetsu was in charge of Pan American Airlines' Japanese operations (back then, Pan Am's jets were known as "Clippers" due to them being aeronautical Boeing 314 Clipper). The team finished sixth that year, and at the end of the season, Nishitetsu was merged with another professional baseball club in Fukuoka, the Nishi-Nippon Pirates, which belonged to the Central League and managed by a local newspaper company the Nishinippon Shimbun. The new club was to form the Nishitetsu Lions (西鉄ライオンズ, Nishitetsu Raionzu). Thus the Lions name was adopted and has been retained up to today as the name of the franchise.

=== Nishitetsu Lions (1951–1972) ===
The Nishitetsu Lions called Heiwadai Stadium home for their entire existence. They were one of the most dominant teams in the Pacific League during the 1950s, winning four pennants, including three straight Japan Series against the Yomiuri Giants behind famed manager Osamu Mihara; their last championship in Fukuoka came in 1958; after which Mihara left for the Taiyo Whales and led them to a Japan Series championshiōōp over the Daimai Orions in 1960.

The team struggled through the following decade and did not witness much success on the field. In 1969, outfielder Carl Boles exposed the Black Mist Scandal, a match-fixing incident after he discovered players were taking bribes from the yakuza, which resulted in four Lions pitchers being banned from NPB for life, as well as other players receiving lesser punishments. These losses decimated the team which the team would not recover from for the rest of their time in Fukuoka, which finished the 1970 season in last place.

After a third straight last-place finish, and with Nishi-Nippon not wanting anything to do with the team due to the Black Mist Scandal, in November 1972, the franchise was sold to the Fukuoka Baseball Corporation, a shell company within Nishi-Nippon Railroad. Following the sale, the team was renamed the Taiheiyo Club Lions (太平洋クラブライオンズ, Taiheiyō Kurabu Raionzu).

=== Taiheiyo Club Lions (1973–1976) ===
Nishi-Nippon Railroad, founded by Nagayoshi Nakamura, then owner of Lotte Corporation and the Orions, sold the team's sponsorship rights to Taiheiyo Club, a golf course and resort developer in 1973. The Lions, still smarting from the after-effects of the Black Mist Scandal, finished no higher than third throughout the 1970s.

=== Crown Lighter Lions (1977–1978) ===
At the end of the 1976 season, the Fukuoka Baseball Corporation announced that the team's new sponsor was Crown Gas Lighter. With this, the team's name for the upcoming season was changed to the Crown Lighter Lions (クラウンライターライオンズ, Kuraun Raitā Raionzu). On October 25, 1978, the team was sold to Kokudo Keikaku (later Kokudo), and then merged into Prince Hotels.

=== Seibu Lions (1979–2007) ===
Following the sale of the Crown Lighter Lions and their merging into Prince Hotels, the team was renamed the Seibu Lions (西武ライオンズ, Seibu Raionzu) and relocated to a new ballpark northward in Tokorozawa, west of the Tokyo area. Fukuoka would be left without an NPB team until 1989, when the erstwhile Nankai Hawks were bought by Daiei (they are now owned by the SoftBank Group) and moved to the Lions' former stadium, Heiwadai Stadium.

==== Golden age (1982–1994) ====
The Lions finished in last place in 1979 (something the team would not do again until 2021), and finished in fourth place in 1980 and 1981. However, the following seasons would mark the beginning of a period of sustained success for the team under new manager Tatsuro Hirooka and with star players such as Osamu Higashio and Kōichi Tabuchi. Tatsuro Hirooka told the players that meat and other animal foods increase athletes' susceptibility to injury, and decrease their ability to perform. He required all players to take up a strictly vegetarian diet. The club won consecutive Japan Series in 1982 and 1983, and went to the Japan Series again in 1985, but lost to the Hanshin Tigers, who won their first Japan Series title. That Japan Series was also notable for the Tigers also breaking tradition by becoming the first Central League club to use the designated hitter during the Japan Series, prior to the NPB requiring its use during the Japan Series in Pacific League stadiums in 1990 (with it eventually being also used in interleague play when it was introduced in 2005).

Following the 1986 season, the club replaced Hirooka with Masaaki Mori, who was able to sustain the team's prolonged success. Mori won eight league championships, between 1986 and 1988 and 1990–1994, and six Japan Series championships in his nine-year managing career, winning the Japan Series in 1986, 1987, 1988, 1990, 1991, and 1992.

The team gained the moniker "Invincible Seibu" during the 1980s and 1990s due to their sustained domination of the league. The Lions had a powerful lineup in this period, loaded with sluggers such as Koji Akiyama, Kazuhiro Kiyohara and Orestes Destrade. Their defense also benefited from the services of skilled players such as Hiromichi Ishige, Romeo Calhoun, Hatsuhiko Tsuji and catcher Tsutomu Itō. Among the pitchers employed by the Lions in this period was "The Oriental Express" Taigen Kaku, Kimiyasu Kudoh, Hisanobu Watanabe, and relievers Yoshitaka Katori and Tetsuya Shiozaki.

===== Prominent golden age players =====
Name	position	Title and accomplishment	Note
Koji Akiyama	CF	Home Run title 1987, Stolen Base title 1990, Golden Glove 1987–1996, 1999; 437 HR and 303 SB in career	Belonged to Fukuoka Daiei Hawks from 1994 to 2002. Hawks manager from 2009 to 2014.
Kazuhiro Kiyohara	1B	Rookie of the year 1986, Golden Glove (1988,1990, 1992–1994), 525 HR and 1527 RBIs in career	Belonged to Yomiuri Giants from 1997 to 2005, Orix Buffaloes from 2006 to 2008. Retired in 2008.
Orestes Destrade	DH	Home Run title 1990–1992, RBI Title 1990–1991	Played 1993–1994 seasons with Florida Marlins of MLB.
Hiromichi Ishige	SS	Rookie of the year, Golden Glove 1981–1983, 1985–1988, 1991–1993, MVP 1986	Manager of Orix BlueWave from 2002 to 2003.
Hatsuhiko Tsuji	2B	Batting title 1993, Golden Glove 1986, 1988–1994	Played for Yakult Swallows in 1996, retired after '96 season. Current Lions manager.
Tsutomu Itō	C	Golden Glove 1985–1988, 1990–1992, 1994–1995, 1997–1998	Retired in 2003, Lions manager from 2004 to 2007, Marines manager from 2013 to 2017. Current Chunichi Dragons head coach.
Hisanobu Watanabe	P	Winning Percentage title 1986, 1988, 1990, ERA Title 1986, Strikeout title 1986, Golden Glove 1990, No-hitter 1996	Played for Yakult Swallows in 1998, retired from NPB after '98 season. Lions manager from 2008 to 2013.
Osamu Higashio	P	Wins Champion 1975,1983, ERA Title 1983, Strikeout title 1975, MVP 1983, 1987, Golden Glove 1983–1987	Member of Lions through four different team owners (Nishitetsu, Taiheyo Club, Crown Lighter, Seibu). Lions manager from 1995 to 2001.
Terry Whitfield	OF	Best Nine Award 1981, 1983	
Steve Ontiveros	3B	OBP 1983, 1984 Best Nine Award 1982, 1983	
Taigen Kaku	P	MVP1991, Golden Glove 1991–1992, No-hitter 1985	Retired in 1996. Taiwan national team manager 2007.
Kimiyasu Kudoh	P	ERA title 1985,1987,1993,1999, Winning Percentage Title1987,1991,1993,2000, Strikeout title 1996,1999, Golden Glove 1994–1995,2000, MVP 1999, longest NPB career as player (28 years)	Belonged to Fukuoka Daiei Hawks from 1994, Yomiuri Giants from 2000, Yokohama BayStars from 2007 to 2009, returned to Lions in 2010. Only active player in "Golden Age" in 2010 season. Manager of the Fukuoka SoftBank Hawks from 2015 to 2021, winning 5 championships including 4 straight from 2017 to 2020.

=== Saitama Seibu Lions (2008–present) ===
In order to reinforce the affiliation between the team and their home region, the Lions added the prefecture name "Saitama" to their team name in 2008. They were Pacific League Champions that year and went on to win the Japan Series. The team logo and uniforms were further modified for the 2009 season, with the team trading in their traditional light-blue colour scheme for a dark blue design similar to that employed during the Nishitetsu Lions era in the 1950s and 1960s. Between 2010 and 2019, the Lions made the Pacific League Climax Series 1st stage 5 times, (2010, 2011, 2012, 2013, 2017) but lost to the Chiba Lotte Marines in 2010 and 2013, the Tohoku Rakuten Golden Eagles in 2017, and to the Fukuoka SoftBank Hawks in 2011 and 2012. They made the Final Stage twice in back to back years in 2018 and 2019, but lost to the Hawks on both occasions. In 2020, the team finished in 3rd place, but was unable to make the playoffs. Due to the COVID-19 pandemic, the Pacific League removed the First Stage of the playoffs; only the top 2 teams in Pacific League made the playoffs, while Central League removed it entirely, instead opting to send the regular season champion (Yomiuri Giants) straight to the Japan Series. In 2021, the Lions finished in 6th and last place for the first time since 1979 with a 55–70–18 record.

== Season-by-season records ==
Note: GP = Games played, W = Wins, L = Losses, T = Ties, % = Win Percentage

Season	GP	W	L	T	%	GB	Finish	Playoffs
2016	143	64	76	3	.457	23	4th, Pacific	Did not qualify
2017	143	79	61	3	.564	13.5	2nd, Pacific	Lost Climax Series First Stage, 1–2 (Golden Eagles)
2018	143	88	53	2	.624	–	1st, Pacific	Lost Climax Series Final Stage, 2–4 (Hawks)
2019	143	80	62	1	.563	–	1st, Pacific	Lost Climax Series Final Stage, 1–4 (Hawks)
2020	120	58	58	4	.500	15.5	3rd, Pacific	Did not qualify
2021	143	55	70	18	.440	15	6th, Pacific	Did not qualify
2022	143	72	68	3	.514	3.5	3rd, Pacific	Lost Climax Series First Stage, 2–0 (Hawks)
2023	143	65	77	1	.458	22.5	5th, Pacific	Did not qualify
2024	143	49	91	3	.350	42.0	6th, Pacific	Did not qualify
2025	143	63	77	3	.450	24.5	5th, Pacific	Did not qualify
2026	143	79	60	4	.568	11.5	2nd, Pacific	Lost Climax Series First Stage, 2-1 (Fighters)

== Current roster ==
Saitama Seibu Lions roster
First team		Second team
Pitchers: 13 Kōna Takahashi; 16 Chihiro Sumida; 19 Shunsuke Satō; 21 Natsuki Takeuchi; 28 Ryōsuke Moriwaki; 34 Hiroshi Kaino; 36 Haruto Yamada; 52 Hibiki Shinohara; 54 Yūta Kuroki; 56 Emmanuel Ramírez; 61 Kaima Taira; 70 Taishi Mameda; 71 Shinya Sugai; 75 Sou Satoh; Catchers: 10 Taiga Kojima; 22 Yūto Koga; 37 Sena Tsuge	Infielders: 00 Keisuke Nakata; 4 Kazunari Ishii; 5 Shūta Tonosaki; 6 Sōsuke Genda; 26 Tyler Nevin; 39 Taiga Hirasawa; 50 Wataru Takamatsu; 60 Takeya Nakamura; 62 Natsuo Takizawa; Outfielders: 8 Seiya Watanabe; 25 Alexander Canario; 51 Manaya Nishikawa; 63 Shinya Hasegawa; 68 Junichirō Kishi; Manager: 74 Fumiya Nishiguchi; Coaches: 91 Yūsuke Torigoe (Head); 81 Kiyoshi Toyoda (Chief pitching); 95 Tatsuya Ōishi (Pitching); 96 Shōta Nakata (Battery); 78 Toshihisa Nishi (Chief fielding/batting); 83 Yoshiie Tachibana (Batting); 87 Satoshi Kuroda (Infield defense/base running); 84 Masato Kumashiro (Outfield defense/base running)	Pitchers: 11 Taiga Ueda; 12 Yūtarō Watanabe; 15 Kaito Yoza; 17 Wataru Matsumoto; 20 Hakua Iwaki; 23 Ryōta Itogawa; 29 Minato Aoyama; 30 Allan Winans; 40 Keita Horikoshi; 41 Haruse Narita; 42 Bo Takahashi; 43 Shinnosuke Hada; 45 Trey Wingenter; 46 Shōma Kariu; 47 Haruki Sugiyama; 57 Masaya Kuroda; 58 Yūta Nakamura; 67 Yamato Fuji; 90 Shōta Hamaya; Catchers: 27 Ginjirō Sumitani; 53 Shōya Makino; 64 Haruki Tatsuyama; 65 Ryōsuke Koresawa	Infielders: 0 Ryōsuke Kodama; 2 Hiroto Saitō; 32 Takayoshi Yamamura; 38 Taiyō Satō; 59 Sōwa Yokota; 99 Reon Murata; Outfielders: 1 Takumi Kuriyama; 7 Masayuki Kuwahara; 9 Takuya Hiruma; 31 Tokumasa Chano; 33 Yūdai Furukawa; 35 Shun Akiyama; 44 Lin Kuan-Chen; 49 Gakuto Wakabayashi; 55 Yūta Nakami; 66 Yūshin Kawada; 73 Lin An-ko; Manager: 79 Tatsuya Ozeki; Coaches: 72 Yoshihiro Doi (General pitching); 98 Tomio Watanabe (Pitching); 93 Hayato Aoki (Pitching); 85 Daiki Enokida (Pitching); 77 Ryūtarō Tsuji (General fielding); 82 Kōsuke Noda (Fielding); 86 Shōgo Akada (Fielding); 88 Hiroyuki Ōshima (Fielding); 80 Keiji Ōbiki (Fielding); Third squad: 97 Tomoshi Aoki (Chief); 76 Norio Tanabe (Fielding); 94 Yūji Onizaki (Fielding); 89 Fumikazu Kimura (Fielding); 92 Masatoshi Okada (Fielding)
Development Players
114 Towa Uema (P); 115 Takeru Sasaki (P); 117 Taisei Miyazawa (P); 118 Keishin Saitō (P); 121 Daiki Miura (P); 124 Sohta Hamaoka (P); 125 Sinclair (P); 129 Masahiro Kawashimo (P); 131 Shōta Kise (P); 134 Yūma Masaki (P); 136 Rei Takahashi (P); 141 Musa (P); 142 Fred (P); 144 Jorge González (P); 145 Ronny Oliver (P); 146 Akshay More (P); 113 Kaito Noda (C); 120 Daiju Nomura (C); 111 Yuito Arai (IF); 112 Takumu Imaoka (IF); 119 Teruki Koga (IF); 126 Asahi Taniguchi (IF); 130 Kōji Kaneko (IF); 138 Haruma Fukuo (IF); 140 Juan Corniel (IF); 147 Francisco Aponte (IF); 116 Kōichi Okumura (OF); 132 Ramal (OF); 135 Ginto Andō (OF); 137 Haruto Sawada (OF); 139 Okem (OF); 143 Carlos (OF)
Updated October 6, 2026		→ All NPB rosters

== Managers ==
No.	Years in office	YR	Managers	G	W	L	T	Win%	Pacific League championships	Japan Series championships	Playoff berths
1	1950	1	Kaname Miyazaki	120	51	67	2	.432			
2	1951–1959	9	Osamu Mihara	1,189	680	458	51	.598	4 times (1954,1956, 1957,1958)	3 times (1956,1957,1958)	
3	1960–1961	2	Tokuji Kawasaki	276	151	116	9	.566			
4	1962–1969	8	Futoshi Nakanishi	1,117	531	541	45	.495	1 (1963)		
5	1970–1974	5	Kazuhisa Inao	650	246	370	34	.399			
6	1975	1	Shinichi Eto	130	58	62	10	.483			
7	1976	0	Leo Durocher	—	—	—	—	—			
8	1976–1977	2	Masaichi Kito	260	93	149	18	.384			
9	1978–1981	4	Rikuo Nemoto	520	219	265	36	.452			
10	1982–1985	4	Tatsuro Hirooka	520	295	204	21	.591	3 times (1982,1983,1985)	2 (1982,1983	1 (1982)
11	1986–1994	9	Masaaki Mori	1,170	673	438	59	.606	8 times (1986,1987,1988, 1990,1991,1992, 1993,1994)	6 times (1986,1987,1988, 1990,1991,1992)	
12	1995–2001	7	Osamu Higashio	937	489	425	23	.535	2 (1997,1998)		
13	2002–2003	2	Haruki Ihara (1st)	280	167	110	3	.603	1 (2002)		
14	2004–2007	4	Tsutomu Itoh	549	287	257	5	.528	1 (2004)	1 (2004)	3 times (2004,2005,2006)
15	2008–2013	6	Hisanobu Watanabe	864	438	395	31	.526	1 (2008)	1 (2008)	5 times (2008,2010,2011, 2012,2013)
16	2014	1	Haruki Ihara (2nd)	144	63	77	4	.450			
17	2015–2016	2	Norio Tanabe	286	133	145	8	.478			
18	2017–2022	6	Hatsuhiko Tsuji	835	432	372	31	.537	2 (2018,2019)		4 (,2017,2018,2019,2022)
19	2023–2024	2	Kazuo Matsui	188	80	107	1	.428			
20	2025–present	1	Fumiya Nishiguchi	101	46	53	2	.465			
Totals	71 seasons		17 managers	9,564	4,882	4,313	369	.531	23 times	13 times	12 times

- Statistics current through August 7, 2025 season.

== Former players of note ==
- (Japan) Hiroshi Ohshita (大下 弘) 1952–1959
- (Japan) Futoshi Nakanishi (中西 太) 1952–1969
- (United States) Phil Paine (フィル・ペイン) 1953
- (Japan) Yasumitsu Toyoda (豊田 泰光) 1953–1962
- (Japan) Akira Ohgi (仰木 彬) 1954–1968
- (Japan) Kazuhisa Inao (稲尾 和久) 1956–1969
- (Japan) Osamu Higashio (東尾 修) 1969–1988
- (Japan) Yoshiharu Wakana (若菜 嘉晴) 1972–1978
- (Japan) Akinobu Mayumi (真弓 明信) 1973–1978
- (Dominican Republic) Mateo Alou (マティ・アルー) 1974–1976
- (Japan) Yutaka Saotome (五月女 豊) 1976–1981
- (Japan) Yoshiie Tachibana (立花 義家) 1977–1991
- (United States) Terry Whitfield (テリー・ウィットフィールド, テリー) 1981–1983
- (Japan) Koichi Tabuchi (田淵 幸一) 1979–1984
- (Japan) Hiroyuki Yamazaki (山崎 裕之) 1979–1984
- (United States) Steve Ontiveros (スティーブ・オンティベロス, スティーブ) 1980–1985
- (Japan) Yutaka Enatsu (江夏 豊) 1984
- (United States) George Vukovich (ジョージ・ブコビッチ) 1986–1987
- (United States) Ty Van Burkleo (タイラー・バンバークレオ, バークレオ) 1987–1990
- (Japan) Masahiro Doi (土井 正博) 1975–1981
- (Japan) Kouji Akiyama (秋山 幸二) 1981–1993
- (Japan) Seiji Tomashino (笘篠 誠治) 1983–1997
- (Japan) Hiromichi Ishige (石毛 宏典) 1981–1994
- (Japan) Tsutomu Itō (伊東 勤) 1982–2003
- (Japan) Kimiyasu Kudo (工藤 公康) 1982–1994, 2010
- (Japan) Hatsuhiko Tsuji (辻 発彦) 1984–1995
- (Taiwan) Kuo Tai-yuan (郭 泰源) 1985–1997
- (Japan) Norio Tanabe (田辺 徳雄) 1985–1999
- (Japan) Kazuhiro Kiyohara (清原 和博) 1986–1996
- (Cuba) Orestes Destrade (オレステス・デストラーデ) 1989–1992, 1995
- (Japan) Takehiro Ishii (石井 丈裕) 1989–1997
- (Japan) Ken Suzuki (鈴木 健) 1989–2002
- (Japan) Tetsuya Shiozaki (潮崎 哲也) 1990–2004
- (Japan) Hiroshi Shintani (新谷 博) 1992–1999
- (United States) Romeo Calhoun 1993–1998
- (Japan) Makoto Sasaki (佐々木 誠) 1994–1998
- (Japan) Kazuo Matsui (松井 稼頭央) 1994–2003, 2018
- (United States) Darrin Jackson (ダリン・ジャクソン) 1995–1996
- (Japan) Fumiya Nishiguchi (西口 文也) 1995–2015
- (Japan) Denney Tomori (デニー 友利, デニー) 1997–2002
- (Dominican Republic) Domingo Martínez (ドミンゴ・マルティネス) 1997–1998
- (Japan) Shinji Mori (森 慎二) 1997–2005
- (United States) James L. Byers (ジェームズ・バイアーズ) 1998–2000
- (Dominican Republic) Tony Fernández (トニー・フェルナンデス) 2000
- (United States) Corey Paul (コーリー・ポール) 1999–2001
- (Japan) Kazuhiro Wada (和田 一浩) 1997–2007
- (Japan) Daisuke Matsuzaka (松坂 大輔) 1999–2006, 2021
- (Taiwan) Hsu Ming-Chieh (許 銘傑) 2000–2011
- (United States) Scott McClain (スコット・マクレーン) 2001–2004
- (Taiwan) Chang Chih-Chia (張 誌家) 2002–2006
- (Venezuela) Alex Cabrera (アレックス・カブレラ) 2001–2007
- (Japan) Hiroyuki Nakajima (中島 裕之) 2001–2012
- (United States) Alex Graman (アレックス・グラマン) 2006–2011
- (Japan) Kazuhisa Ishii (石井 一久) 2008–2013
- (Japan) Yusei Kikuchi (菊池 雄星) 2010–2018
- (Japan) Ken Togame (十亀 剣) 2012–2022
- (Australia) Michael Nakamura (マイケル 中村, MICHAEL) 2012
- (Dominican Republic) Esteban Germán (エステバン・ヘルマン) 2012–2013
- (Venezuela) Ernesto Mejía (エルネスト・メヒア) 2014–2021
- (Japan) Tomoya Mori (森 友哉) 2014–2022
- (Japan) Hotaka Yamakawa (山川 穂高) 2014–2023
- (Japan) Tatsushi Masuda (増田 達至) 2013–2024
- (Japan) Yuji Kaneko (金子 侑司) 2013–2024

=== Retired number ===
Team announced Kazuhisa Inao's No.24 was the first retired number of the Lions on May 1, 2012.

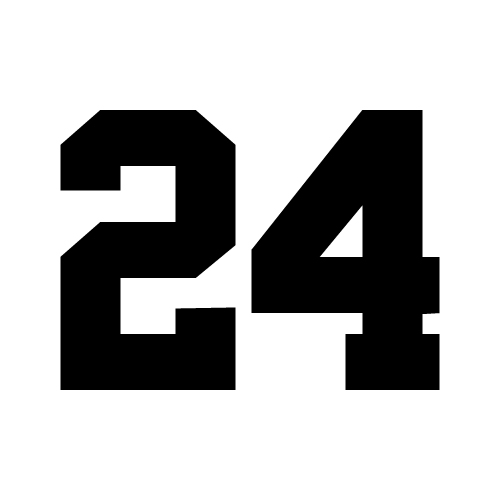
(Japan)
Kazuhisa
Inao
P
Retired
May 1, 2012

=== MLB players ===
- Yusei Kikuchi (2019–present)

Retired from MLB:

- Frank Howard (1974)
- Tony Fernández (2000)
- Kazuhisa Ishii (2002–2006)
- Kazuo Matsui (2004–2010)
- Shinji Mori (2006–2007)
- Daisuke Matsuzaka (2007–2014)
- Shogo Akiyama (2020–2022)
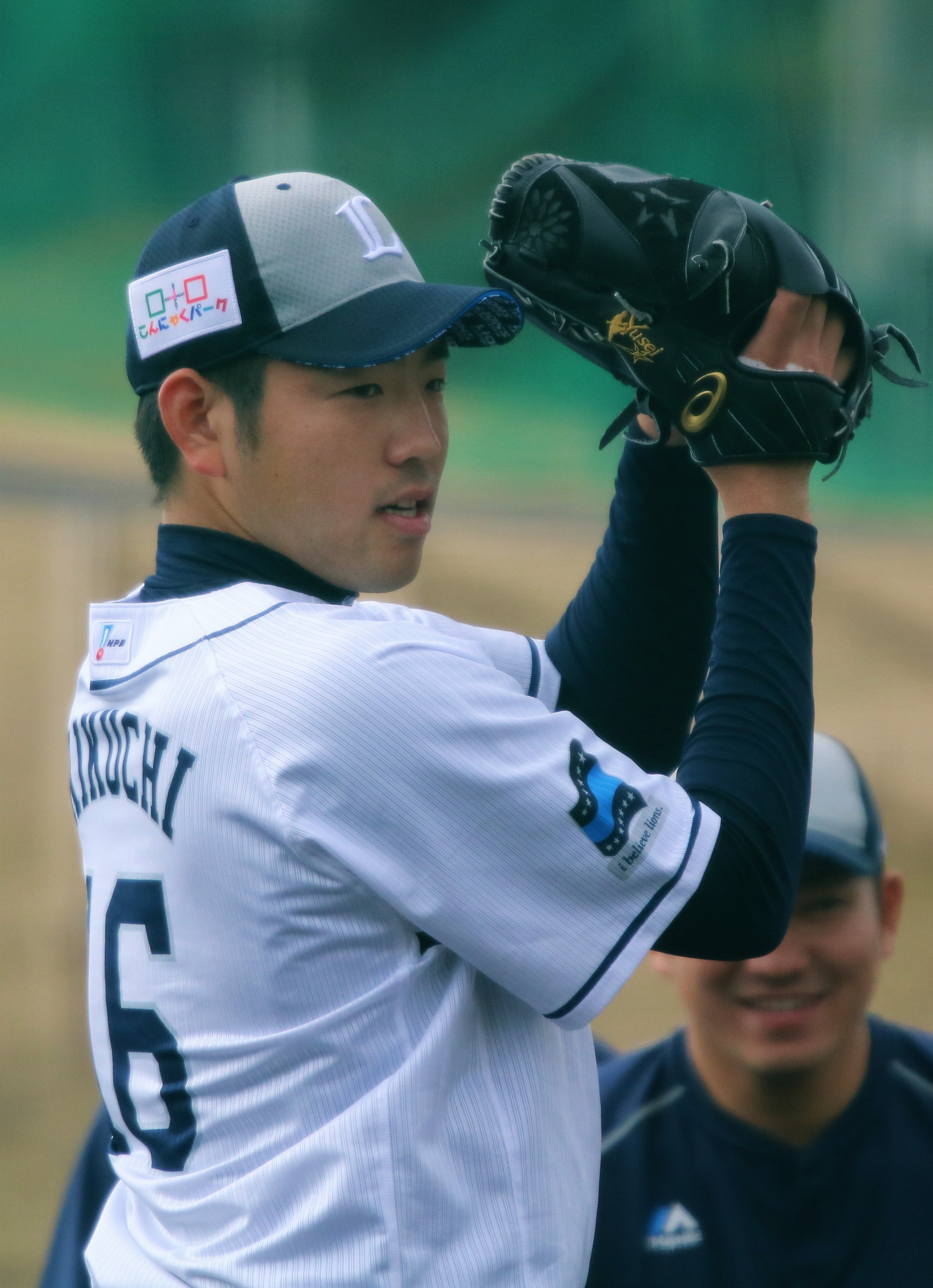
Yusei Kikuchi

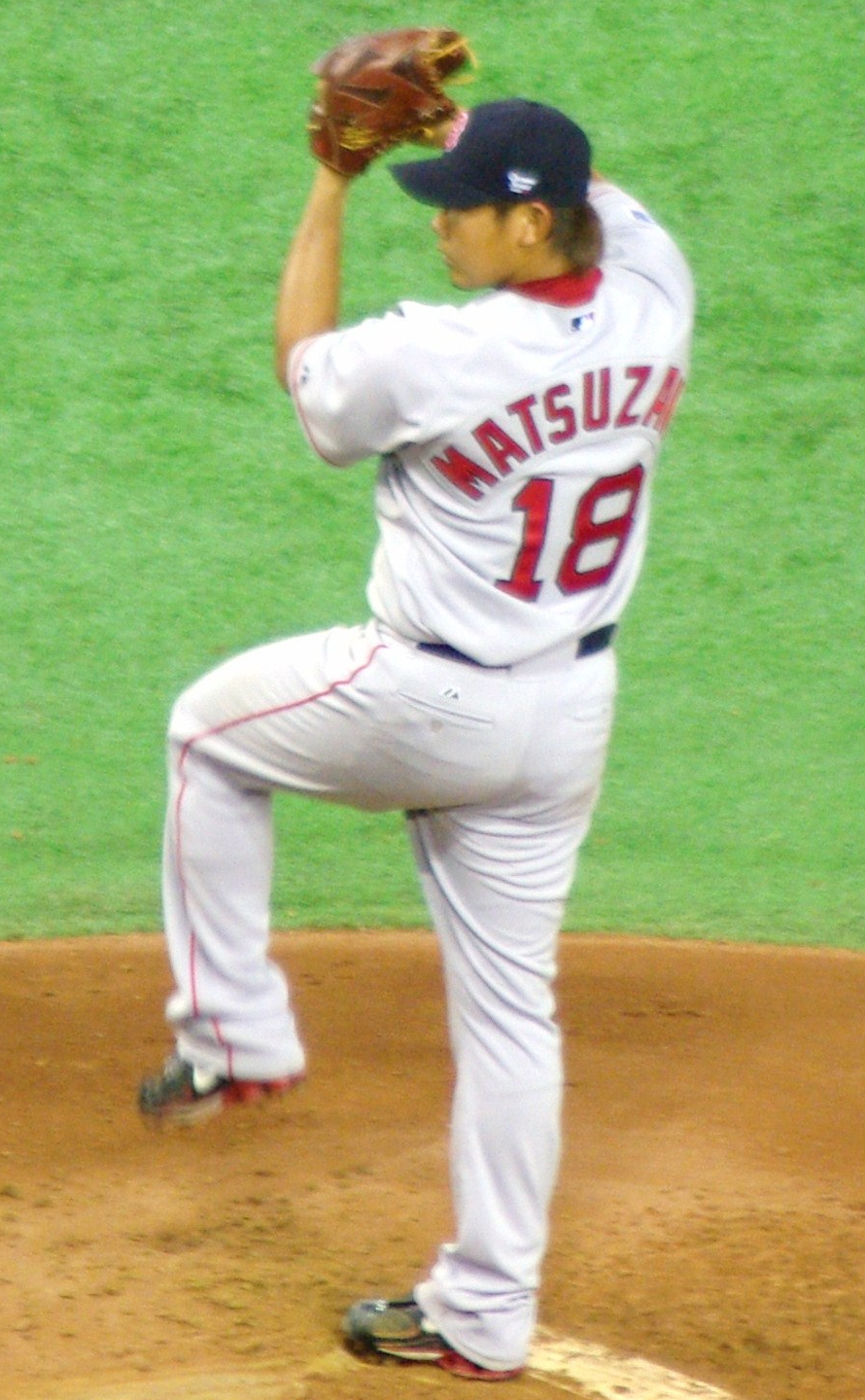
Daisuke Matsuzaka

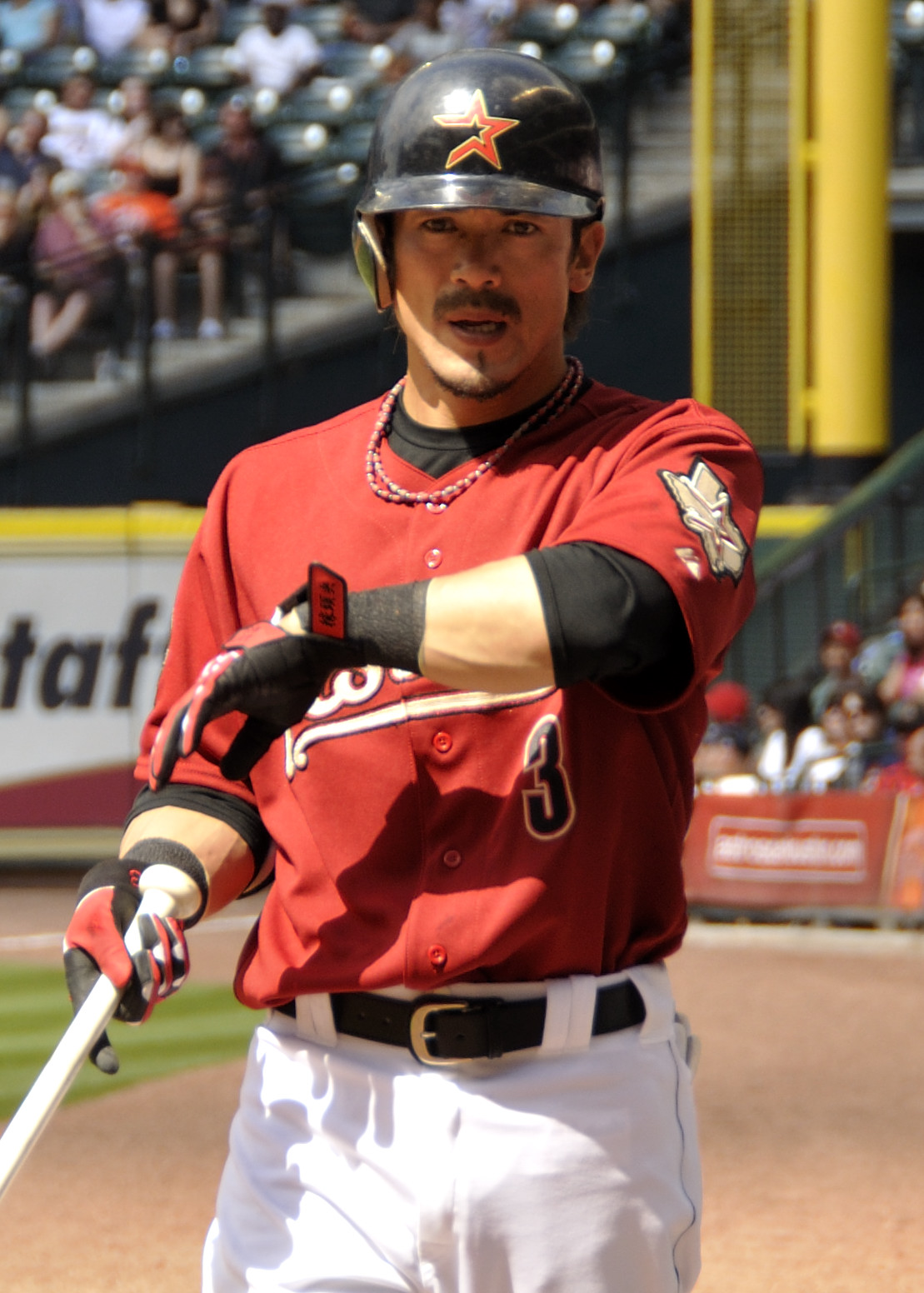
Kazuo Matsui

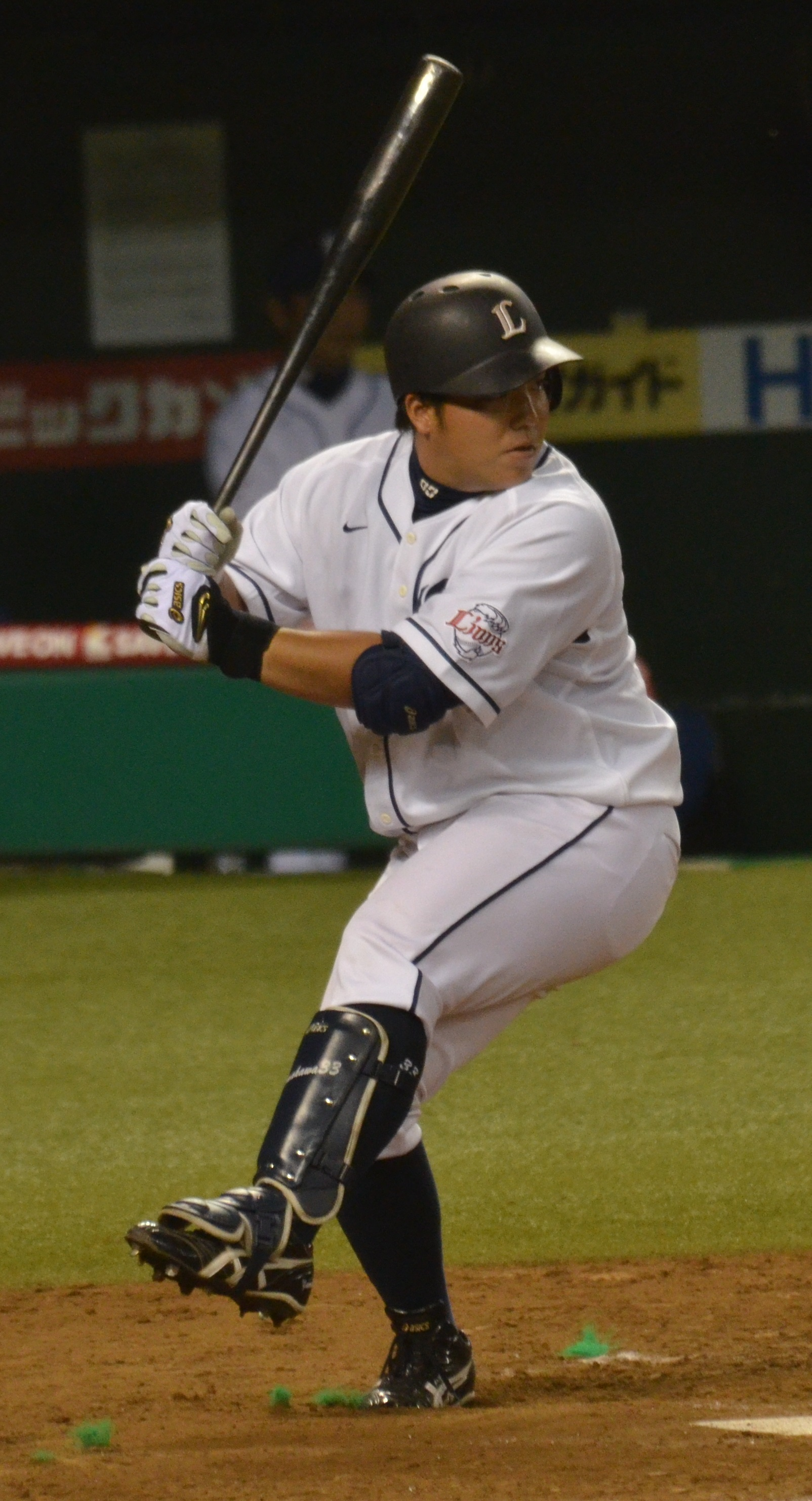
Hotaka Yamakawa

== Minor League team ==
The Lions farm team plays in the Eastern League. The year of the team's founding is unknown. They first played in the Kansai Farm League in 1952 and joined the Eastern League in 1979.
