= 1950 Japan Series =

Team (Wins)	Managers	Season
Mainichi Orions (4)	Yuasa Yoshio	81–34–5 (.704), 15 GA
Shochiku Robins (2)	Tokuro Konishi	98–35–4 (.737), 9 GA
- Dates: November 22–28
- MVP: Kaoru Betto (MAI)

The 1950 Japan Series was the inaugural championship series of Nippon Professional Baseball (NPB) for the 1950 season. The first edition of the Japan Series, it was a best-of-seven playoff that matched the Pacific League champion Mainichi Orions against the Central League champion Shochiku Robins. In a series that saw six different stadiums host a game, the Orions defeated the Robins in six games.

Highlights of the series included the first game of the series going to extra innings that saw Mainichi pull out the victory on the road in 12 innings, while Shosei Go of the Orions became the first player to hit a home run in the Japan Series in Game 2. In the deciding Game 6, Yoshiyuki Iwamoto hit two home runs for the Robins as the Orions saw a 7-3 lead turn into a tie game by the end of nine innings. The Orions went to extras and got the game-winning hit on an error in the 11th to end the series. Takeshi Nomura won three games for the Orions while Kaoru Betto had a .500 batting average with twelve hits and 3 RBIs to win the very first Japan Series MVP Award. The series ended on November 28, which as of 2026 is the latest a Japan Series has ever ended.

== Summary ==
PL Mainichi Orions (4) vs. CL Shochiku Robins (2)

Game	Date	Score	Location	Time	Attendance
1	November 22	Mainichi Orions – 3, Shochiku Robins – 2	Meiji Jingu Stadium	2:34	23,018
2	November 23	Shochiku Robins – 1, Mainichi Orions – 5	Korakuen Stadium	1:38	35,541
3	November 25	Mainichi Orions – 6, Shochiku Robins – 7	Koshien Stadium	1:54	19,399
4	November 26	Shochiku Robins – 5, Mainichi Orions – 3	Hankyu Nishinomiya Stadium	1:42	35,518
5	November 27	Mainichi Orions – 3, Shochiku Robins – 2	Nagoya Baseball Stadium	1:49	12,630
6	November 28	Shochiku Robins – 7, Mainichi Orions – 8	Osaka Stadium	2:40	22,035

== Matchups ==
=== Game 1 ===
Wednesday, November 22, 1950 1:16 pm (JST) at Meiji Jingu Stadium in Shinjuku, Tokyo
Team	1	2	3	4	5	6	7	8	9	10	11	12	R	H	E
Mainichi	0	1	0	0	0	0	0	0	0	0	0	2	3	9	1
Shochiku	0	0	0	0	0	0	0	1	0	0	0	1	2	7	2
WP: Tadashi Wakabayashi (1–0) LP: Nobuo Oshima (0–1)

=== Game 2 ===
Thursday, November 23, 1950 1:01 pm (JST) at Korakuen Stadium in Bunkyo, Tokyo
Team	1	2	3	4	5	6	7	8	9	R	H	E
Shochiku	0	0	0	0	0	0	0	1	0	1	7	0
Mainichi	2	0	2	0	1	0	0	0	X	5	13	1
WP: Takeshi Nomura (1–0) LP: Koichi Eda (0–1); Home runs: SHO: None; MAI: Shosei Go (1)

=== Game 3 ===
Saturday, November 25, 1950 1:30 pm (JST) at Koshien Stadium in Nishinomiya, Hyōgo Prefecture
Team	1	2	3	4	5	6	7	8	9	R	H	E
Mainichi	1	0	0	1	0	0	4	0	0	6	8	2
Shochiku	0	0	0	4	0	0	0	0	3	7	7	2
WP: Shigeo Sanada (1–0) LP: Atsushi Aramaki (0–1); Home runs: MAI: Yasuji Hondo (1), Atsushi Aramaki (1); SHO: None

=== Game 4 ===
Sunday, November 26, 1950 1:31 pm (JST) at Hankyu Nishinomiya Stadium in Nishinomiya, Hyōgo Prefecture
Team	1	2	3	4	5	6	7	8	9	R	H	E
Shochiku	1	0	0	3	0	1	0	0	0	5	7	0
Mainichi	1	0	0	0	0	0	0	0	2	3	8	2
WP: Nobuo Oshima (1–1) LP: Tadashi Wakabayashi (1–1); Home runs: SHO: Yoshiyuki Iwamoto (1); MAI: None

=== Game 5 ===
Monday, November 27, 1950 12:59pm (JST) at Nagoya Baseball Stadium in Nagoya, Aichi Prefecture
Team	1	2	3	4	5	6	7	8	9	R	H	E
Mainichi	1	0	0	0	0	0	1	0	1	3	6	1
Shochiku	1	0	0	1	0	0	0	0	0	2	5	1
WP: Takeshi Nomura (2–0) LP: Shigeo Sanada (1–1)

=== Game 6 ===
Tuesday, November 28, 1950 1:29pm (JST) at Osaka Stadium in Osaka, Osaka Prefecture
Team	1	2	3	4	5	6	7	8	9	10	11	R	H	E
Shochiku	0	1	2	0	2	1	0	1	0	0	0	7	15	6
Mainichi	0	0	6	1	0	0	0	0	0	0	1	8	9	0
WP: Takeshi Nomura (3–0) LP: Nobuo Oshima (1–2); Home runs: SHO: Yoshiyuki Iwamoto 2 (3); MAI: None

Yoshiyuki Iwamoto gave the Robins an early 3-0 lead with home runs in the second and third innings but the Orions overcame the early 3-0 hole with six runs in the third inning in a game marred by six errors. The series-winning run came on a grounder by Shoichi Ito that saw the throw spill out.

== See also ==
- 1950 World Series
