= 1950 Nippon Professional Baseball season =

1950 NPB season
- League: Nippon Professional Baseball
- Sport: Baseball
- Duration: March 10 – November 28, 1950

Central League pennant
- League champions: Shochiku Robins
- Runners-up: Chunichi Dragons
- Season MVP: Makoto Kozuru (SHO)

Pacific League pennant
- League champions: Mainichi Orions
- Runners-up: Nankai Hawks
- Season MVP: Kaoru Betto (MAI)

Japan Series
- Champions: Mainichi Orions
- Runners-up: Shochiku Robins
- Finals MVP: Kaoru Betto (MAI)

NPB seasons
- ← Japanese Baseball League 1951 →

The 1950 Nippon Professional Baseball season was the first season for baseball in Japan that used the new two league format since the split the previous year. The two leagues would be known as the Central League and the Pacific League.

== Regular season ==
=== Standings ===
Central League regular season standings
Team	G	W	L	T	Pct.	GB
Shochiku Robins	137	98	35	4	.737	—
Chunichi Dragons	137	89	44	4	.669	9.0
Yomiuri Giants	140	82	54	4	.603	17.5
Osaka Tigers	140	70	67	3	.511	30.0
Taiyo Whales	140	69	68	3	.504	31.0
Nishi Nippon Pirates	136	50	83	3	.376	48.0
Kokutetsu Swallows	138	42	94	2	.309	57.5
Hiroshima Carp	138	41	96	1	.299	59.0

Pacific League regular season standings
Team	G	W	L	T	Pct.	GB
Mainichi Orions	120	81	34	5	.704	—
Nankai Hawks	120	66	49	5	.574	15.0
Daiei Stars	120	62	54	4	.534	19.5
Hankyu Braves	120	54	64	2	.458	28.5
Nishitetsu Clippers	120	51	67	2	.432	31.5
Tokyu Flyers	120	51	69	0	.425	32.5
Kintetsu Pearls	120	44	72	4	.379	37.5

== Postseason ==
=== Japan Series ===
PL Mainichi Orions (4) vs. CL Shochiku Robins (2)

Game	Date	Score	Location	Time	Attendance
1	November 22	Mainichi Orions – 3, Shochiku Robins – 2	Meiji Jingu Stadium	2:34	23,018
2	November 23	Shochiku Robins – 1, Mainichi Orions – 5	Korakuen Stadium	1:38	35,541
3	November 25	Mainichi Orions – 6, Shochiku Robins – 7	Koshien Stadium	1:54	19,399
4	November 26	Shochiku Robins – 5, Mainichi Orions – 3	Hankyu Nishinomiya Stadium	1:42	35,518
5	November 27	Mainichi Orions – 3, Shochiku Robins – 2	Nagoya Baseball Stadium	1:49	12,630
6	November 28	Shochiku Robins – 7, Mainichi Orions – 8	Osaka Stadium	2:40	22,035

== League leaders ==
=== Central League ===
Batting leaders
Stat	Player	Team	Total
Batting average	Fumio Fujimura	Osaka	.362
Home runs	Makoto Kozuru	Shochiku	51
Runs batted in	Makoto Kozuru	Shochiku	161
Runs	Makoto Kozuru	Shochiku	143
Hits	Fumio Fujimura	Osaka	191
Stolen bases	Jiro Kanayama	Shochiku	74

Pitching leaders
Stat	Player	Team	Total
Wins	Shigeo Sanada	Shochiku	39
Losses	Ryohei Hasegawa	Hiroshima	27
Earned run average	Nobuo Oshima	Shochiku	2.03
Strikeouts	Shigeru Sugishita	Chunichi	209
Innings pitched	Shigeo Sanada	Shochiku	395 2/3

=== Pacific League ===
Batting leaders
Stat	Player	Team	Total
Batting average	Hiroshi Oshita	Tokyu	.339
Home runs	Kaoru Betto	Mainichi	43
Runs batted in	Kaoru Betto	Mainichi	105
Runs	Kaoru Betto	Mainichi	108
Hits	Kaoru Betto	Mainichi	160
Stolen bases	Chusuke Kizuka	Nankai	78

Pitching leaders
Stat	Player	Team	Total
Wins	Atsushi Aramaki	Mainichi	26
Losses	Yoshio Tenpo	Hankyu	24
Earned run average	Atsushi Aramaki	Mainichi	2.06
Strikeouts	Yasuo Yonekawa	Tokyu	207
Innings pitched	Yasuo Yonekawa	Tokyu	363 2/3

== Awards ==
- Most Valuable Player
  - Makoto Kozuru, Shochiku Robins (CL)
  - Kaoru Betto, Mainichi Orions (PL)
- Rookie of the Year
  - Nobuo Oshima, Shochiku Robins (CL)
  - Atsushi Aramaki, Mainichi Orions (PL)
- Eiji Sawamura Award
  - Shigeo Sanada, Shochiku Robins (CL)

Central League Best Nine Award winners
Position	Player	Team
Pitcher	Shigeo Sanada	Shochiku
Catcher	Shoji Arakawa	Shochiku
First baseman	Michio Nishizawa	Chunichi
Second baseman	Shigeru Chiba	Yomiuri
Third baseman	Fumio Fujimura	Osaka
Shortstop	Katsumi Shiraishi	Yomiuri
Outfielder	Makoto Kozuru	Shochiku
Outfielder	Noboru Aota	Yomiuri
Outfielder	Yoshiyuki Iwamoto	Shochiku

Pacific League Best Nine Award winners
Position	Player	Team
Pitcher	Atsushi Aramaki	Mainichi
Catcher	Takeshi Doigaki	Mainichi
First baseman	Tokuji Iida	Nankai
Second baseman	Yasuji Hondo	Mainichi
Third baseman	Nobuo Nakatani	Hankyu
Shortstop	Chusuke Kizuka	Nankai
Outfielder	Kaoru Betto	Mainichi
Outfielder	Hiroshi Oshita	Tokyu
Outfielder	Shigeya Iijima	Daiei

== See also ==
- 1950 All-American Girls Professional Baseball League season
- 1950 Major League Baseball season
