= Kazuhiro Kuroda =

Japanese baseball player (1924–2007)

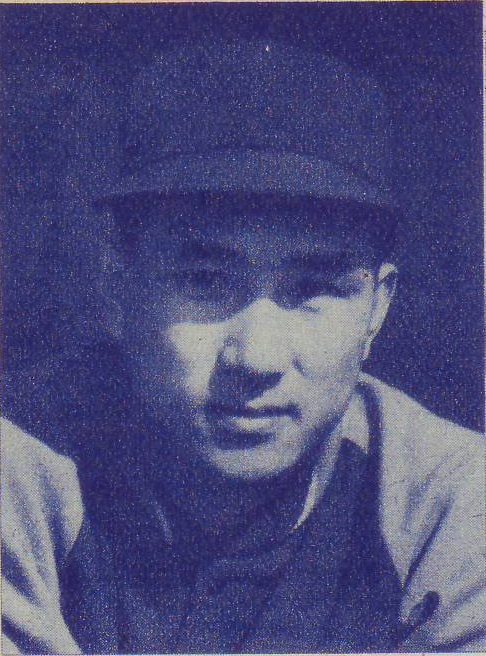
- Center fielder
- Born: September 13, 1924; Sasebo, Nagasaki, Japan
- Died: August 17, 2007 (aged 82)
- Batted: Right Threw: Right
- Stats at Baseball Reference

Teams
- Nankai Hawks (1949–1953); Takahashi Unions (1954–1955); Daiei Stars (1956)

Kazuhiro Kuroda (黒田 一博, September 13, 1924 – August 17, 2007) was a Japanese professional baseball centerfielder in Nippon Professional Baseball (NPB).

== Career ==
Kuroda attended Sasebo Shogyo High School.

Kuroda was a center fielder for eight years in NPB. He debuted with the 1949 Nankai Hawks, hitting .324/.360/.408 in 51 games, mostly as a bench player. In 1950, Kuroda hit .257/.282/.405 in his first year as a regular, then he batted .259/.279/.382 the next season. In 1952, Kazuhiro had a .241/.263/.324 year and he finished his Nankai run at .246/.287/.322 in 1953. Kuroda was taken in the expansion draft by the new Takahashi Unions and hit .246/.290/.334 their first year. In 1955, he slipped to .237/.269/.307, then he finished his career by going just 7 for 62 for the 1956 Daiei Stars. Overall, his batting line read .246/.279/.340.

== Retirement ==
After retiring, he opened a sports store and was active in Little League. He died of lung cancer at age 82.

== Personal life ==
Kuroda's wife, Yasuko, competed in the 1964 Olympics in the shot put. His son, Hiroki, pitched in NPB and Major League Baseball.
