= Takashi Eda =

Japanese baseball player and coach

Takeshi Eda 江田 孝
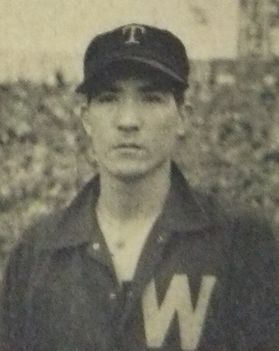
- Pitcher
- Born: March 18, 1923; Hyōgo, Japan
- Died: February 11, 1978 (aged 54)
- Batted: Right Threw: Right

debut
- 1941, for the Hankyu

Last appearance
- 1957, for the Taiyo Whales

NPB statistics
- Win–loss record: 97–147
- Earned run average: 3.61
- Strikeouts: 447

Teams
- As player: Hankyu (1941–1943); Gold Star/Kinsei Stars (1946–1947); Taiyo Robbins/Shochiku Robins(1948–1951); Taiyo Shochiku Robins/Yosho Robins/Taiyo Whales (1952–1957); As coach: Kintetsu Buffaloes (1965–1971); Taiheiyo Club Lions/Crown Lighter Lions (1973–1977)

Takashi Eda (江田 孝, Eda Takashi; March 18, 1923 – February 11, 1978) was a Nippon Professional Baseball pitcher. From 1948 to 1955 he went by the name of Koichi Eda. He finished his career in 1957.
