= Aramaki =

Aramaki (written: 荒巻 or 荒牧) is a Japanese surname. Notable people with the surname include:

- Atsushi Aramaki (荒巻 淳, 1926–1971), Japanese baseball player
- Shinji Aramaki (荒牧 伸志, born 1960), Japanese anime director and mechanical designer
- Yoshihiko Aramaki (荒牧 慶彦, born 1990), Japanese actor and voice actor
- Yoshio Aramaki (荒巻 義雄, born 1933), Japanese novelist

Fictional characters:

- Daisuke Aramaki, a character in the Ghost in the Shell franchise

== See also ==
- Aramaki-jake, a kind of Japanese salted salmon
