= Takeshi Nomura =

Japanese baseball player

Takeshi Nomura 野村 武史
- Pitcher
- Born: April 5, 1919; Gifu, Japan
- Died: January 29, 1985 (aged 65)
- Batted: Right Threw: Right

debut
- 1946, for the Senators

Last appearance
- 1956, for the Mainichi Orions

NPB statistics
- Win–loss record: 73–73
- Earned run average: 3.20
- Strikeouts: 376

Teams
- Senators (1946); Mainichi Orions (1950–1953); Takahashi Unions/Tombo Unions(1954–1955); Mainichi Orions (1956)

Takeshi Nomura (野村 武史, Nomura Takeshi; born Kiyoshi Nomura, April 5, 1919 – January 29, 1985) was a Nippon Professional Baseball pitcher.
