= Komajiro Tamura =

Komajirō Tamura
- 田村 駒治郎
- Born: February 21, 1904; Osaka, Japan
- Died: January 21, 1961 (aged 56)
- Occupations: Businessman, professional baseball team owner
- Known for: Owner of Dai Tokyo / Lion / Asahi / Pacific / Taiyo Robins / Shochiku Robins (1937–1952); Gold Star / Kinsei Stars (1946–1948)

Komajirō Tamura

Member of the Japanese

Baseball Hall of Fame
- Induction: 1970

Komajirō Tamura (February 21, 1904 – January 21, 1961) was a Japanese businessman and professional baseball team owner.

Tamura was a textile manufacturer, and owner of, among others, Taiyo Rayon and of Lucky Gold Star Telephones. Prior to becoming a team owner, he sponsored a number of amateur baseball tournaments. He owned the baseball franchise ultimately known as the Shochiku Robins from 1937 to 1952, and the franchise known as Gold Star/the Kinsei Stars from 1946 to 1948. During his ownership both teams underwent a number of name changes, particularly the Robins, which started out as Dai Tokyo, and then became, in order, Lion, Asahi, Pacific, the Taiyo Robins, and finally the Shochiku Robins.

== Acquisition of Dai Tokyo ==
The Japanese Baseball League (JBL) began operations in 1936. In 1937, Tamura acquired Dai Tokyo, one of the founding members of the JBL, from the Tokyo daily newspaper Kokumin Shimbun. On August 31, 1937, midway through the fall baseball season, Tamura gained sponsorship from Lion Toothpaste, and changed the team name to the Lion Baseball Club.

Late in the 1940 season, due to rising tensions with the West, the JBL outlawed the use of English team names. Tamura, however, refused to change the team's name, insisting that "Lion" was a Japanese word. (In actuality, he wanted to honor the team's sponsorship contract with the Lion Corporation.) The team completed the season as Lion, finishing in last place, 50 games behind Tokyo Kyojin. (Up to that point, the team had never had a winning season and had never finished higher than sixth place.)

In 1941 the team moved from Tokyo to Osaka and acquired new sponsorship from Asahi Shimbun; from 1941 to 1944 it was called the Asahi Baseball Club, and in 1943 had its first winning season, finishing at 41-36-7, in third place. Due to World War II, no baseball season took place in 1945.

After the resumption of the JBL in 1946, the team changed its name to the Pacific Baseball Club (popularly known as Taihei — "Peace").

== Founding of Gold Star; conflict ==
Tamura, meanwhile, started another baseball franchise in 1946 — Gold Star, named after his Lucky Gold Star Telephones brand. Gold Star signed many of Asahi/Pacific's former players, as well as its former manager Michinori Tubouchi.

To fill out its roster, Pacific signed long-time Tokyo Kyojin/Yomiuri Giants pitcher Victor Starffin, as well as some other famous players. These signings led to a serious conflict, and Pacific was forced to forfeit four games that season.

English nicknames returned to Japanese baseball after the 1946 season, and Pacific changed its name to the Taiyo Robins — "Taiyo" came from Tamura's fabric store, Taiyo Rayon, and "Robins" from Tamura's personal nickname, "Koma" ("robins" in Japanese). The kanji for "Taiyo" (太陽) has connotations of the sun, and for a brief confusing period the team featured the words "Suns" on its road uniforms and "Robins" on its home uniforms.

In 1947 Gold Star became the Kinsei Stars ("Kinsei" meaning made of gold in Japanese) and in 1948 it signed Starffin away from Tamura's other team, the Taiyo Robins.

Tamura sold the Kinsei Stars to Masaichi Nagata and Daiei Film after the 1948 season, leaving him solely as owner of the Taiyo Robins.

== Final years as owner of the Robins ==
The Robins continued to underperform. In 1950, when the JBL reorganized to become Nippon Professional Baseball, the Robins joined NPB's Central League (the franchise ended its Japanese Baseball League run with a losing season every single year except 1943). Sponsorship by the Shochiku Corporation led to it becoming known as the Shochiku Robins. Amazingly, that year the team won 46 more games than the year before, totaling 98 wins and coming in first in their division. The Robins played in the inaugural Japan Series, ultimately falling to the Mainichi Orions, 4 games to 2.

After a mediocre year in 1951, the Robins lost 84 games in 1952. It was decided that any Central League teams ending the season with a winning percentage below .300 would be disbanded or merged with other teams. The Robins fell into this category, and were merged with the Taiyo Whales to become the Taiyo Shochiku Robins in January 1953.

== Honors ==
Tamura was inducted into the Japanese Baseball Hall of Fame in 1970.
