= Makoto Kozuru =

Japanese baseball player (1922–2003)

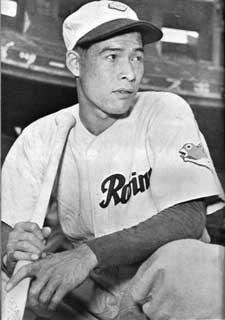
- Kozuru with the Shochiku Robins
- Outfielder, Infielder
- Born: December 17, 1922; Iizuka, Fukuoka, Japan
- Died: June 2, 2003 (aged 80)
- Batted: Right Threw: Right

debut
- 1942, for the Nagoya-gun

Last appearance
- 1958, for the Hiroshima Carp

Career statistics
- Batting average: .280
- Home runs: 230
- Hits: 1,717
- Stats at Baseball Reference

Teams
- As player: Nagoya-gun / Chubu Nippon / Chubu Nippon Dragons (1942–1943, 1946–1947); Kyuei Flyers (1948); Daiei Stars (1949); Shochiku Robins (1950–1952); Hiroshima Carp (1953–1958); As coach: Kokutetsu Swallows / Sankei Swallows (1964-1965); Hanshin Tigers (1968)

Career highlights and awards
- Central League MVP (1950); Single-season RBI record (161); 50-home run season; Best Nine Award, 1949, 1950; All Star (3x)

Member of the Japanese

Baseball Hall of Fame
- Induction: 1980

Makoto Kozuru (小鶴 誠, Kozuro Makoto; December 17, 1922 — June 2, 2003) was a Japanese professional baseball player who played in both the Japanese Baseball League and Nippon Professional Baseball. He was the MVP of the Central League in 1950, and was inducted into the Japanese Baseball Hall of Fame in 1980. His nickname was "The Japanese DiMaggio."

Kozuru played as an outfielder and infielder. He holds the Japanese baseball record for most RBIs in a single season with 161 in 1950. That same year he also hit 51 home runs, becoming the first Japanese player to break the 50-homer mark in a single season.

Kozuru made his professional debut at age 19 with Nagoya-gun (the team that eventually became known as the Chunichi Dragons). After two years with the club, he spent 1944 and 1945 in the Japanese navy. Kozuru returned to his original team for the 1946 and 1947 seasons, and then spent one season each with the Kyuei Flyers and Daiei Stars in 1948 and 1949. He hit .361 in 1949, leading the league in hitting and earning Best Nine Award honors.

Joining the Shochiku Robins in 1950 (the first year of Nippon Professional Baseball), Kozuru had a season for the ages, hitting .355, and leading the Central League in home runs with 51, RBI with a still-league record 161, and runs scored with 143. He led the Robins to the inaugural Japan Series, which they lost to the Mainichi Orions, 4 games to 2. (Kozuru was 4 for 23 in the Series, with no home runs.

The Robins merged with the Taiyo Whales following the 1952 season and Kozuru joined the Hiroshima Carp for the balance of his career. A herniated disk in his back curtailed his production and he ended up retiring in 1958 at the age of 35.
