= Kaoru Betto =

Japanese baseball player and manager

Kaoru Betto 別当 薫
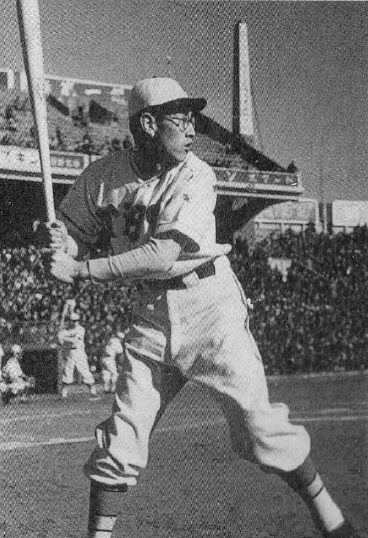
- Outfielder / Manager
- Born: August 23, 1920; Nishinomiya, Hyōgo
- Died: April 16, 1999 (aged 78)
- Batted: Right Threw: Right

NPB debut
- 1948, for the Ōsaka Tigers

Last NPB appearance
- 1957, for the Mainichi Orions

NPB statistics
- Batting average: .302
- Hits: 965
- RBIs: 549
- Stats at Baseball Reference

Teams
- As a player: Ōsaka Tigers (1948–1949); Mainichi Orions (1950–1957); As a manager: Mainichi Orions/Mainichi Daimai Orions (1952, 1954–1959); Kintetsu Buffaloes (1962–1964); Taiyō Whales/Yokohama Taiyō Whales (1968–1972, 1977–1979); Hiroshima Toyo Carp (1973)

Career highlights and awards
- Pacific League MVP (1950); Japan Series champion (1950); Japan Series MVP (1950); 6× Best Nine Award (1948–1953)

Member of the Japanese

Baseball Hall of Fame
- Induction: 1988
- Election method: Selection Committee for Players
- Last updated on: January 6, 2026

Kaoru Betto (別当 薫, Bettō Kaoru; August 23, 1920 - April 16, 1999) was a Nippon Professional Baseball player and manager. He made his professional debut as a 28-year old for the Ōsaka Tigers in 1948. He played for the team for two seasons. Betto achieved his most noted success for the Mainichi Orions from 1950 to 1957. In his first season with the Orions, Betto won the first Pacific League MVP Award and helped lead the team to victory in the first Japan Series; he batted .500 and had twelve hits with 3 RBIs during the Series to win the very first Japan Series MVP Award. As an outfielder, Betto was named to the Best Nine six straight times from 1948 to 1953. After his playing days ended, he became a manager for four different teams, where he had a managerial record of 1,237–1,156.

Betto was inducted into the Japanese Baseball Hall of Fame in 1988.

== Cultural references ==
A T-shirt featuring a cartoon image of Betto was worn by Jeff Bridges' characters in at least three films, including The Fisher King, Cold Feet, and The Big Lebowski.
