= 1978 Japan Series =

Team (Wins)	Managers	Season
Yakult Swallows (4)	Tatsuro Hirooka	68–46–16 (.596), 3 GA
Hankyu Braves (3)	Toshiharu Ueda	82–39–9 (.678)
- Dates: October 14–22
- MVP: Katsuo Osugi (Yakult)
- FSA: Mitsuhiro Adachi (Hankyu)

The 1978 Japan Series was the championship series of Nippon Professional Baseball (NPB) for the 1978 season. The 29th edition of the Series, it was a best-of-seven playoff that matched the Central League champion Yakult Swallows against the Pacific League champion Hankyu Braves. The Braves entered the series looking to win their fourth consecutive title, while the Swallows were making their first-ever Japan Series appearance. The Swallows defeated the Braves in seven games to claim their first championship.

== Summary ==
Game	Score	Date	Location	Attendance
1	Swallows – 5, Braves – 6	October 14	Korakuen Stadium	34,218
2	Swallows – 10, Braves – 6	October 15	Korakuen Stadium	39,406
3	Braves – 5, Swallows – 0	October 17	Hankyu Nishinomiya Stadium	20,296
4	Braves – 5, Swallows – 6	October 18	Hankyu Nishinomiya Stadium	20,456
5	Braves – 3, Swallows – 7	October 19	Hankyu Nishinomiya Stadium	18,298
6	Swallows – 3, Braves – 12	October 21	Korakuen Stadium	44,956
7	Swallows – 4, Braves – 0	October 22	Korakuen Stadium	36,359

== See also ==
- 1978 World Series
