= Yasuji Hondo =

Japanese baseball player, manager, and coach

Yasuji Hondo 本堂 保次
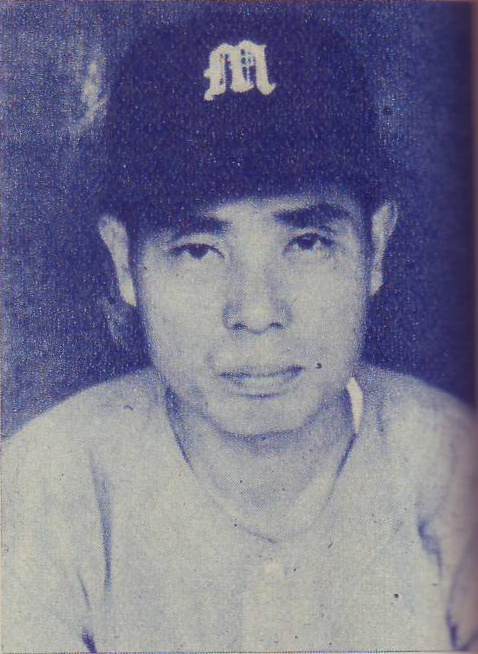
- Yasuji Hondo 1955
- Second baseman / Manager
- Born: March 18, 1918; Yao, Osaka, Japan
- Died: June 8, 1997 (aged 79)
- Batted: Right Threw: Right

debut
- 1937, for the Osaka Tigers

Last appearance
- 1957, for the Mainichi Orions

NPB statistics
- Batting average: .261
- Hits: 1,242
- Runs batted in: 588

Teams
- As player: Hanshin/Osaka Tigers (1937–1947, 1949); Shochiku Robins (1948); Mainichi Orions/Daimai Orions (1950–1958); As manager: Daimai Orions/Tokyo Orions (1963–1965); As coach: Daimai Orions/Tokyo Orions (1959–1962); Kintetsu Buffaloes (1974–1981)

Yasuji Hondo (本堂 保次, Hondō Yasuji; March 18, 1918 - June 8, 1997) was a Nippon Professional Baseball second baseman and manager. He received the Best Nine Award as a second baseman in 1950.
