= Nobuo Oshima =

Japanese professional baseball player

Nobuo Oshima 大島 信雄
- Pitcher
- Born: October 2, 1921; Ichinomiya, Aichi, Japan
- Died: January 8, 2005 (aged 83)
- Batted: Left Threw: Left

debut
- 1950, for the Shochiku Robins

Last appearance
- 1955, for the Chunichi Dragons

NPB statistics
- Win–loss record: 64–41
- Earned run average: 2.82
- Strikeouts: 273

Teams
- As player: Shochiku Robins (1950–1951); Nagoya Dragons/Chunichi Dragons (1952–1955); As coach: Chunichi Dragons (1969–1971)

Career highlights and awards
- Central League Rookie of the Year (1950)

Nobuo Oshima (大島 信雄, Ōshima Nobuo; October 2, 1921 – January 8, 2005) was a Nippon Professional Baseball pitcher for Shochiku Robins and the Chunchi Dragons. His professional career record was 64 wins and 41 losses. In 1940, he pitched shutouts in all 4 games at the Senbatsu Baseball Tournament, helping Gifu Prefectural Commercial High School win. He attended Keio University.
