= Victor Starffin =

Japanese baseball player (1916-1957)

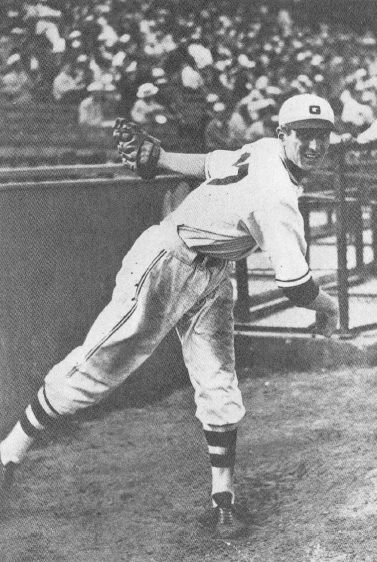
- Pitcher
- Born: 1 May 1916 (Note: According to the biography The Gaijin Pitcher: The Life and Times of Victor Starffin by John Berry, which utilizes details from Starffin's daughter Natasha's writings about family oral history, the date is possibly inaccurate. According to the Julien calendar of the time in the Russian Empire, Starffin was born on April 21. When the Russian Revolution changed the calendar to the Gregorian style, the date would be modified to May 4, but according to Barry, the Starffin family, which had already lost three children in youth, used May 1 as his birthday to make it easier to remember.); Nizhny Tagil, Verkhotursky Uyezd, Perm Governorate, Russian Empire
- Died: 12 January 1957 (aged 40); Setagaya, Tokyo, Japan
- Batted: Right Threw: Right

JBL debut
- 1936, for the Tokyo Kyojingun

Last NPB appearance
- July 12, 1955, for the Takahashi Unions

JBL/NPB statistics
- Win–loss: 303–176
- Earned run average: 2.09
- Shutouts: 83
- Innings pitched: 4,175.1
- Strikeouts: 1,960

Teams
- Tokyo Kyojingun (1934–1944); Pacific/Taiyo Robins (1946–1947); Kinsei Stars/Daiei Stars (1948–1953); Takahashi Unions/Tombow Unions (1954–1955)

Career highlights and awards
- Japanese Triple Crown (1938 Fall); 2× Japanese Baseball League MVP (1939, 1940); Best Nine Award winner (1940); Pitched a no-hitter on 3 July 1937; 6x 20-game winner (1937, 1938, 1939, 1940, 1942, 1949); 3x 30-game winner (1938, 1939, 1940); 40-game winner (1939); All-Star selection (1952); Japanese record: 83 career shutouts

Member of the Japanese

Baseball Hall of Fame
- Induction: 1960

Viktor Starukhin (Russian: Виктор Константинович Старухин, romanized: Viktor Konstantinovich Starukhin; 1 May 1916 – 12 January 1957), nicknamed "the blue-eyed Japanese" (青い目の日本人, aoi-me no Nihonjin), or more commonly known as Victor Starffin (ヴィクトル・スタルヒン), was a Japanese baseball player. Born in Russia, he became the first professional pitcher in Japan to win 300 games. With 83 career shutouts, he ranks number one all-time in Japanese professional baseball.

== Biography ==
=== Early years ===
Viktor Starukhin (also known as Victor Starffin) was born in 1916 in Nizhny Tagil, in the Urals region of what was then the Russian Empire, but after the Russian Revolution he moved with his family initially to Harbin, Manchuria, then eventually settling in Asahikawa, Hokkaidō, where he attended Asahikawa Higashi High School. Initially bullied due to him not being Japanese, Starukhin eventually studied the language well, and was also very athletic, so much so that he would still win a 100-meter dash, even if his classmates got a 20-meter head start. This had been partly due to his size. Specifically, he stood at 6 feet (180cm) by the age of 11. He was also good at baseball, having discovered the sport after moving to Japan. His tall height mixed well with baseball, as his skill allowed him to use it as a way to connect and make friends with his classmates, and it also allowed him to distance himself from his family issues of his father, Konstantine Starukhin, resorting to heavy drinking.

Initially, Starukhin was scouted by Koyo Gakuin High School in Nishinomiya, but other schools complained about it, as they weren't on the idea of a foreigner pitching for them, so he joined Asahikawa Higashi's baseball team, helping them to 2 consecutive finals of the Hokkaido tournament of the Japanese High School Baseball Championship, failing both times to qualify for Summer Koshien.

Starukhin wanted to get into Waseda University, but he was scouted by Matsutaro Shoriki in the autumn of 1934 as a member of the national baseball team for an exhibition game against the United States. At that time, the Ministry of Education had a regulation stating that high school baseball players who played professionally forfeited their eligibility to enter higher education, so Starukhin was reluctant to turn pro. However, he and his family had entered Japan on transit visas, and his father, Konstantin Starukhin, was in jail awaiting trial on charges of involuntary manslaughter, as he had murdered a co-worker of his wife due to political differences between both parties, and because of that, he was able to claim he killed her due to him thinking she was a spy sent by the Soviet government to monitor Russian refugees in Hokkaido. Shoriki effectively blackmailed Starukhin, stating that if Starukhin refused to play professionally, Shoriki would use his connections with the Yomiuri Shimbun to publicise the details of Konstantin Starukhin's case, therefore deporting him and his mother back to Russia, and likely to be arrested by the NKVD due to his father's political alignment.

=== Tōkyō Kyojingun/Yomiuri Giants ===
Starukhin was signed by the Tōkyō Kyojingun (now the Yomiuri Giants), outside the draft, in 1936, and played for them until 1944. He was one of the premier pitchers in the Japanese baseball "dead-ball era" (pre-1945), when many of Japan's best players were serving in the Imperial Japanese Army. He won two MVP awards and a Best Nine award, and won at least 26 games in six different years, winning a league record 42 games in 1939. He followed his record-setting 1939 performance with another 38 wins in 1940. He also became the first foreign player in NPB history to throw a no-hitter, doing so against the Korakuen Eagles on July 3, 1937.

=== World War II ===
In 1940, as xenophobia increased in Japan, Starukhin was forced to change his name to Suda Hiroshi. Later, during World War II, wartime paranoia resulted in Starukhin being placed in a detention camp at Karuizawa with diplomats and other foreign residents.

=== Post-war career ===
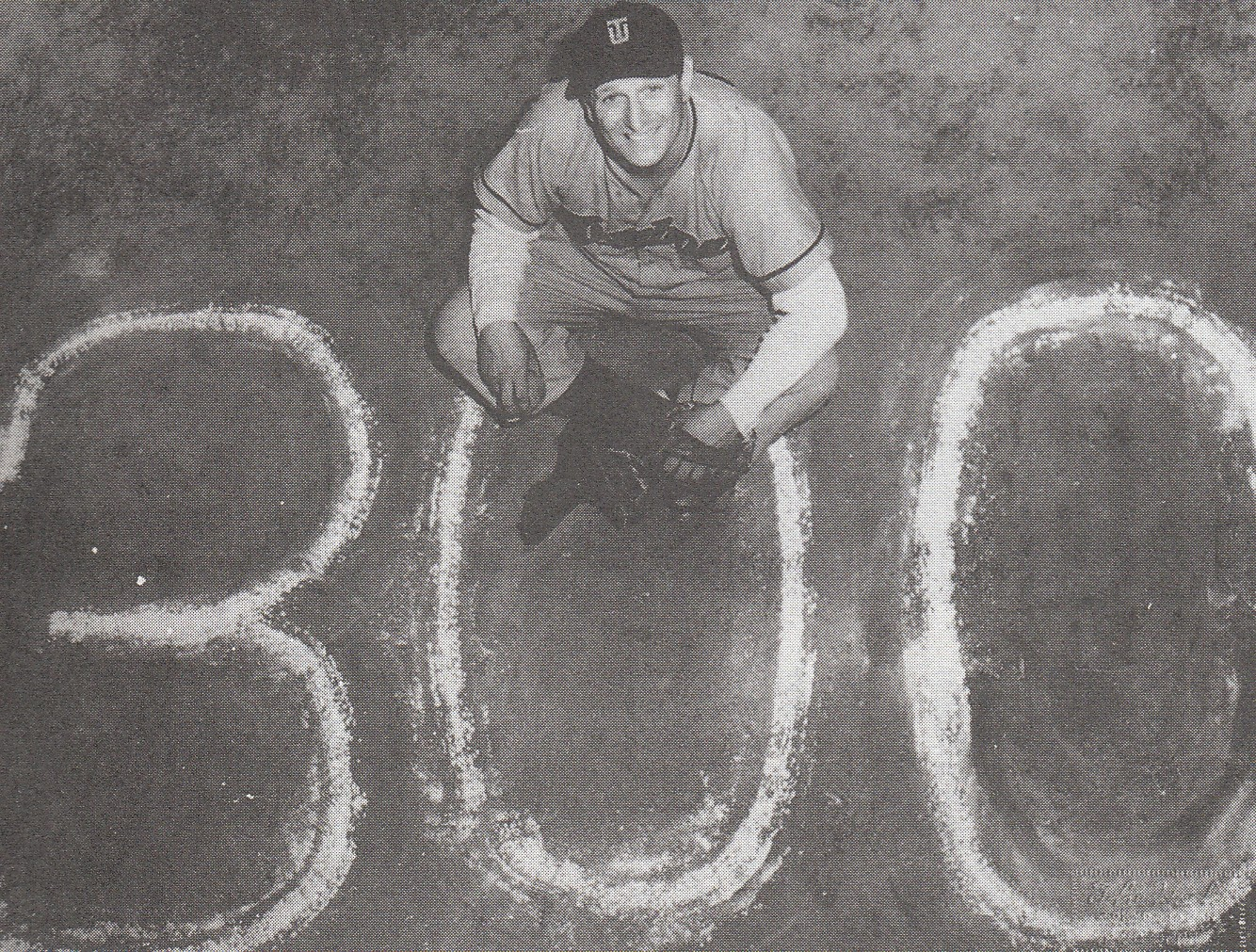
Starffin was the first pitcher to win 300 games in Japanese baseball

After a brief period working as an interpreter for the U.S. Occupation authorities (SCAP), Starukhin returned to professional baseball in 1946, but chose not to return to the Giants, instead signing a contract with a new team, the Pacific Baseball Club, owned by Komajiro Tamura. Pacific's contracts with several famous players, including Starukhin, led to a serious conflict, and Pacific was forced to forfeit four games. However, this decision ultimately resulted in Starukhin's old team the Giants losing the first Japanese championship after World War II, as one of Pacific's forfeited games had been a loss to Kinki Great Ring (now the Fukuoka SoftBank Hawks): the change from a loss to a win gave Great Ring the title over the Giants.

Starukhin stayed with Pacific in 1947, which became known as the Taiyo Robins. In 1948 he moved to Tamura's other team, the Kinsei/Daiei Stars, staying with that franchise through 1953 (although Tamura sold the team to Daiei Film after the 1948 season). Starukhin finally signed with the Takahashi/Tombow Unions (a forerunner of the Chiba Lotte Marines) in 1954–55. In 1955, his last season, he became the first career 300-game winner in Japanese professional baseball. Originally, it was thought that Starukhin recorded his 300th win against the Kintetsu Pearls at Kawasaki Stadium on July 28, 1955. However, due to NPB rules on pitcher wins pre-war, it was only considered his 298th. He would get his actual 300th win on the 9th of September against his former Daiei Stars team at Nishinokyogoku Stadium in Kyoto City. When asked what he wanted to do next, Starukhin stated he wanted to get 2,000 career strikeouts and 100 shutouts before ending his baseball career. He never got to do so, due to him being forced to retire as after a 7-21 record in 1955, he was cut from the Unions and no other team wanted to sign him, despite him stating he was willing to also pitch for free. He retired in 1955 with a career record of 303 wins and 176 losses.

=== Retirement ===
After retirement, he became an actor and presenter of radio programs.

=== Death ===
In 1957, Starukhin was killed in a traffic accident when the car he was driving was hit by a tram on the Tōkyū Tamagawa Line (now replaced by the Tōkyū Den-en-toshi Line) in Setagaya, Tokyo on his way to a high school reunion with his classmates from Asahikawa Higashi High School. The 2022 documentary Tokyo Giant: The Legend of Victor Starffin stated that Starffin apparently had been drinking earlier, which may or may not have played a part in the crash.

Starukhin is buried in Tama Cemetery in Tokyo. He was the first player to be honored in a funeral where former teammates of his shared stories of his time playing with them.

== Tributes ==
In 1960, he became the first foreigner elected to the Japanese Baseball Hall of Fame.

Asahikawa City has nicknamed its municipal baseball stadium, as Asahikawa Starffin Stadium, since 1984.

== Personal life ==
Starukhin spoke fluent Japanese and was said to be "more Japanese than Japanese" with respect for his in-laws, but he was worried that his friends would never cross the line with the labels "foreigner" and "exile". It was said to be the case. Therefore, he went to the Orthodox church "Nikolai-do" in Ochanomizu (neighborhood in Tokyo) where other Russians emigrants gathered. He searched for friends and even found a bride.

=== Family ===
In 1939, Starukhin married a Russian emigrant, Elena. In 1941, their only child George was born. Elena then filed for divorce and left for the United States, leaving the seven-year-old George in Japan with Starukhin.

His second wife was a Japanese woman named Kunie, whom he married in 1950. She took care of his son, and they had two daughters, Natalija and Elizaveta. After the death of her husband, Kunie worked several jobs to support her family. Natalia would go on to become a journalist and write about her father. On May 1, 2016, on what would have been Starukhin's 100th birthday she threw out the opening pitch in Asahikawa where he grew up.

== Professional Statistics ==
Year	Team	G	W	L	IP	K	BB	HR	ERA
1936 Summer	Kyojin	1	0	0	3.0	4	1	0	0.00
1936 Autumn	Kyojin	3	1	2	21.0	19	7	0	3.00
1937 Summer	Kyojin	25	13	4	147.1	92	58	1	1.53
1937 Autumn	Kyojin	26	**15**	7	164.2	95	51	0	1.86
1938 Summer	Kyojin	24	**14**	3	158.2	76	57	5	2.04
1938 Autumn	Kyojin	24	**19**	2	**197.2**	**146**	59	0	**1.05**
1939	Kyojin	68	**42**	15	458.1	**282**	156	4	1.73
1940	Kyojin	55	**38**	12	436.0	245	145	3	0.97
1941	Kyojin	20	15	3	150.0	58	45	3	1.20
1942	Kyojin	40	26	8	306.1	110	119	3	1.12
1943	Kyojin	18	10	5	136.0	71	57	2	1.19
1944	Kyojin	7	6	0	66.0	27	23	0	0.68
1946	Pacific	5	1	1	31.2	11	16	1	1.99
1947	Taiyo	20	8	10	162.1	77	48	3	2.05
1948	Kinsei	37	17	13	298.1	138	80	6	2.17
1949	Daiei	**52**	**27**	17	**376.0**	163	69	24	2.61
1950	Daiei	35	11	15	234.1	86	48	21	3.96
1951	Daiei	14	6	6	100.2	47	22	5	2.68
1952	Daiei	24	8	10	150.1	44	43	9	3.05
1953	Daiei	26	11	9	201.2	61	42	11	2.68
1954	Takahashi	29	8	13	178.1	52	45	12	3.73
1955	Tombow	33	7	**21**	196.2	56	30	9	3.89
**Total**	―	586	303	176	4175.1	1960	1221	122	2.09

*Bold = led league

Awards
Preceded by Haruyasu Nakajima (fall); N.A. (self)	Japanese Baseball League MVP; 1939; 1940	Succeeded by N.A. (self); Tetsuharu Kawakami

== See also ==
- Russians in Japan
- White Emigre
- Koji Ota

Awards
Preceded by Haruyasu Nakajima	Japanese Baseball League MVP; 1939–1940	Succeeded by Tetsuharu Kawakami
