= Tokuro Konishi =

Japanese baseball manager (1894–1977)

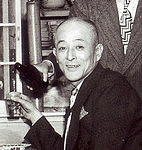
- Manager
- Born: July 10, 1894; Tokyo, Japan
- Died: June 9, 1977 (aged 82)

JBL debut
- Spring, 1936, for the Dai Tokyo

Last NPB appearance
- Fall, 1953, for the Taiyo Shochiku Robins

JBL/NPB statistics
- Games: 735
- Win–loss record: 359–359
- Winning %: .500

Teams
- As manager: Dai Tokyo/Lion (1936–1938); Nagoya Baseball Club (1939–1941); Shochiku Robins/Taiyo Shochiku Robins (1950, 1952–1953)

Career highlights and awards
- Central League champion (1950)

Member of the Japanese

Baseball Hall of Fame
- Induction: 1971
- Election method: Special Committee

Tokuro Konishi (小西 得郎) (July 10, 1894 – June 9, 1977) was a Japanese baseball manager.

Konishi played for Nihon University and Meiji University.

He had three stints as manager for the franchise eventually known as the Shochiku Robins, first from 1936 to 1938, when the team was known as Dai Tokyo and then the Lion Baseball Club; then in 1950; and again for part of 1952 when it was known as the Robins.

After his first stint as manager with Dai Tokyo/Lion, he managed the Nagoya Baseball Club from 1939 to 1941.

Konishi returned to managing in 1950, the first year of the Nippon Professional Baseball. His Robins won 98 games, first in the Central League. They lost the inaugural Japan Series to the Mainichi Orions. He was inducted into the Japanese Baseball Hall of Fame in 1971.
