= Kinugasa Stadium =

Baseball stadium in Kita-ku, Kyoto, Japan

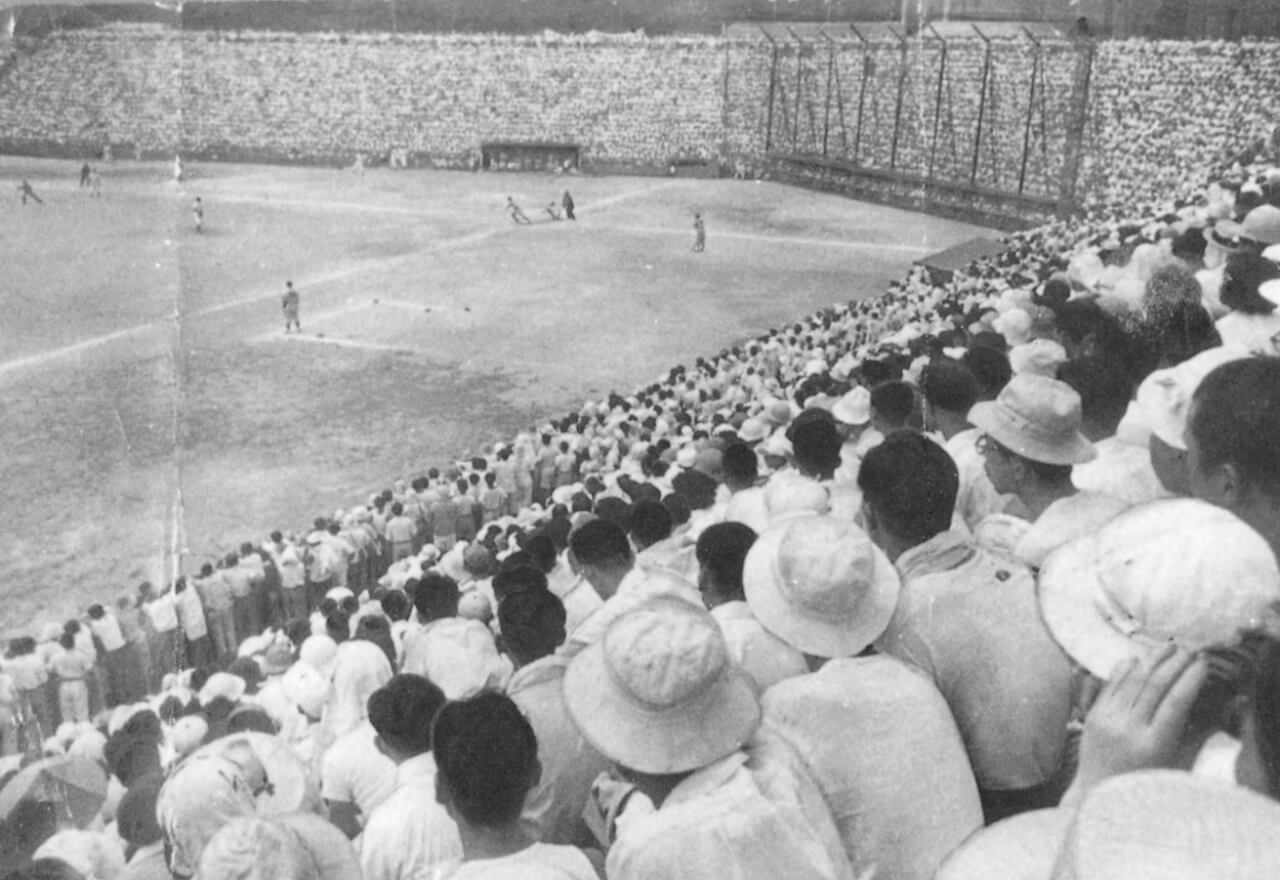
- The stadium in 1951
- Location: Kita-ku, Kyoto, Japan
- Owner: Ritsumeikan University
- Capacity: 20,000
- Field size: Left field - 89.9 m (295 ft); Center field - 110.1 m (361 ft); Right field - 89.9 m (295 ft)

Construction
- Opened: 1948
- Demolished: 1968

Tenant
- Shochiku Robins (1950–1952)

Kinugasa Stadium was a major league baseball stadium in Kyoto, Japan. The Shochiku Robins played there from 1950 to 1952.

== History ==
In 1946, the Ritsumeikan University began constructing a stadium in the Kinugasa Campus in the Kita-ku ward in northern Kyoto. The stadium was inaugurated in 1948 as the Ritsumeikan Kinugasa Baseball Stadium to be used by the Ritsumeikan University baseball team. The Kinugasa Stadium opened in September 1948 and had its first game with a match between the Ritsumeikan University and the Doshisha University baseball teams.

The stadium also hosted high school baseball tournaments and professional baseball, hosting the Shochiku Robins from 1950 to 1952. The Kinugasa Stadium was demolished in 1968.
