= Yoshiyuki Iwamoto =

Japanese baseball player and manager (1912–2008)

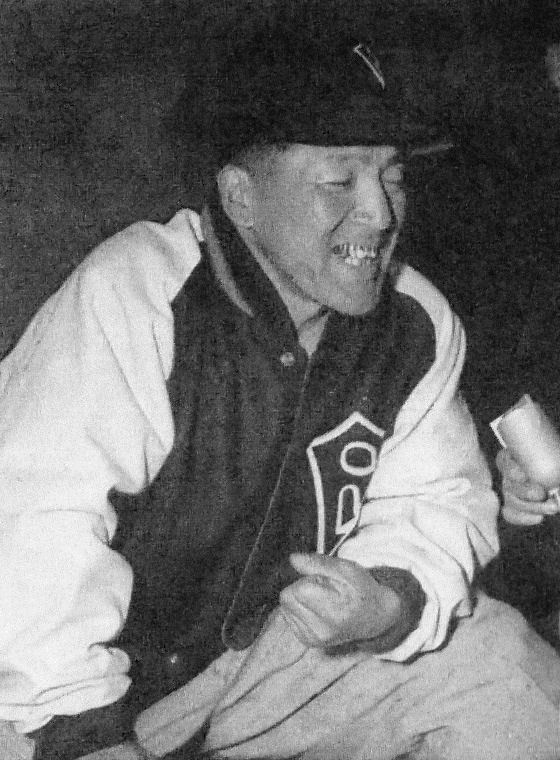
- Outfielder / Manager
- Born: 11 March 1912; Miyoshi, Hiroshima Prefecture, Japan
- Died: 26 September 2008 (aged 96)
- Batted: Right Threw: Right

JBL debut
- 1940, for the Nankai Baseball Club

Last NPB appearance
- 1957, for the Toei Flyers

JBL/NPB statistics
- Batting average: .275
- Home runs: 123
- Runs batted in: 487
- Stats at Baseball Reference

Teams
- As player: Nankai Baseball Club (1940–1942); Taiyo/Shochiku Robins (1949–1953); Toei Flyers (1956–1957); As manager: Nankai Baseball Club (1942); Toei Flyers (1956–1960); Osaka Kintetsu Buffaloes (1965–1966)

Career highlights and awards
- 2x Best Nine Award (1950, 1951); Three home runs in one game (1942); First home run in history of Central League (1950); Four home runs in one game (1951); At age 45, oldest player in NPB to hit home run (1957)

Member of the Japanese

Baseball Hall of Fame
- Induction: 1981

Yoshiyuki Iwamoto (岩本 義行, Iwamoto Yoshiyuki; March 11, 1912 – September 26, 2008) was a Japanese baseball player and manager. He is a member of the Japanese Baseball Hall of Fame.

== Biography ==
Iwamuto was born in Miyoshi, Hiroshima Prefecture. He took part in the National High School Baseball Championship in 1931, but his team was defeated by a team of Masao Yoshida (who was also later inducted to Japanese Baseball Hall of Fame).

He joined the Nankai Baseball Club in 1938, but he was forced to take part in World War II, so his professional debut didn't occur until 1940. The quality of baseballs was low due to the war, so it was difficult for hitters to hit home runs, but Iwamuto hit three home runs in one game on July 11, 1942, the Japanese record at that time. He retired once in 1942 and went to war again.

Iwamoto returned to baseball in 1949, joining the Taiyo Robins. On March 11, 1950, he hit the first home run in the history of the Central League, a grand slam home run. That same year, he hit three home runs in the first Japan Series, which his team lost to the Mainichi Orions, 4 games to 2. On August 1, 1951, he hit four home runs in one game, becoming the first professional hitter in Japan to achieve that feat. He retired again in 1953.

He signed with Toei Flyers and returned to the field again as a playing manager in 1956. On August 18, 1957, he hit his final home run, at the age of 45, which is the Japanese age record.

As manager of the Toei Flyers from 1956 to 1960, Iwamoto compiled a record of 290–376, with 17 ties, for a winning percentage of .435.

Iwamoto was inducted into the Japanese Baseball Hall of Fame in 1981.
