= Takahashi Unions =

Information
- League: Nippon Professional Baseball * Pacific League
- Ballpark: Kawasaki Stadium
- Established: 1954
- Folded: 1956
- Former name: Tombo Unions (1955)
- Ownership: Ryutaro Takahashi

The Takahashi Unions (高橋ユニオンズ, Takahashi Yunionzu) were a Japanese team in Nippon Professional Baseball. A Pacific League expansion team in 1954, they were brought into the league to increase the number of teams to eight. The team was stocked with players from the other Pacific League teams, including aging pitcher Victor Starffin. In their three years of existence the team finished in the second division every season.

The Unions played their games at Kawasaki Stadium in Kawasaki, Kanagawa.

== Franchise history ==
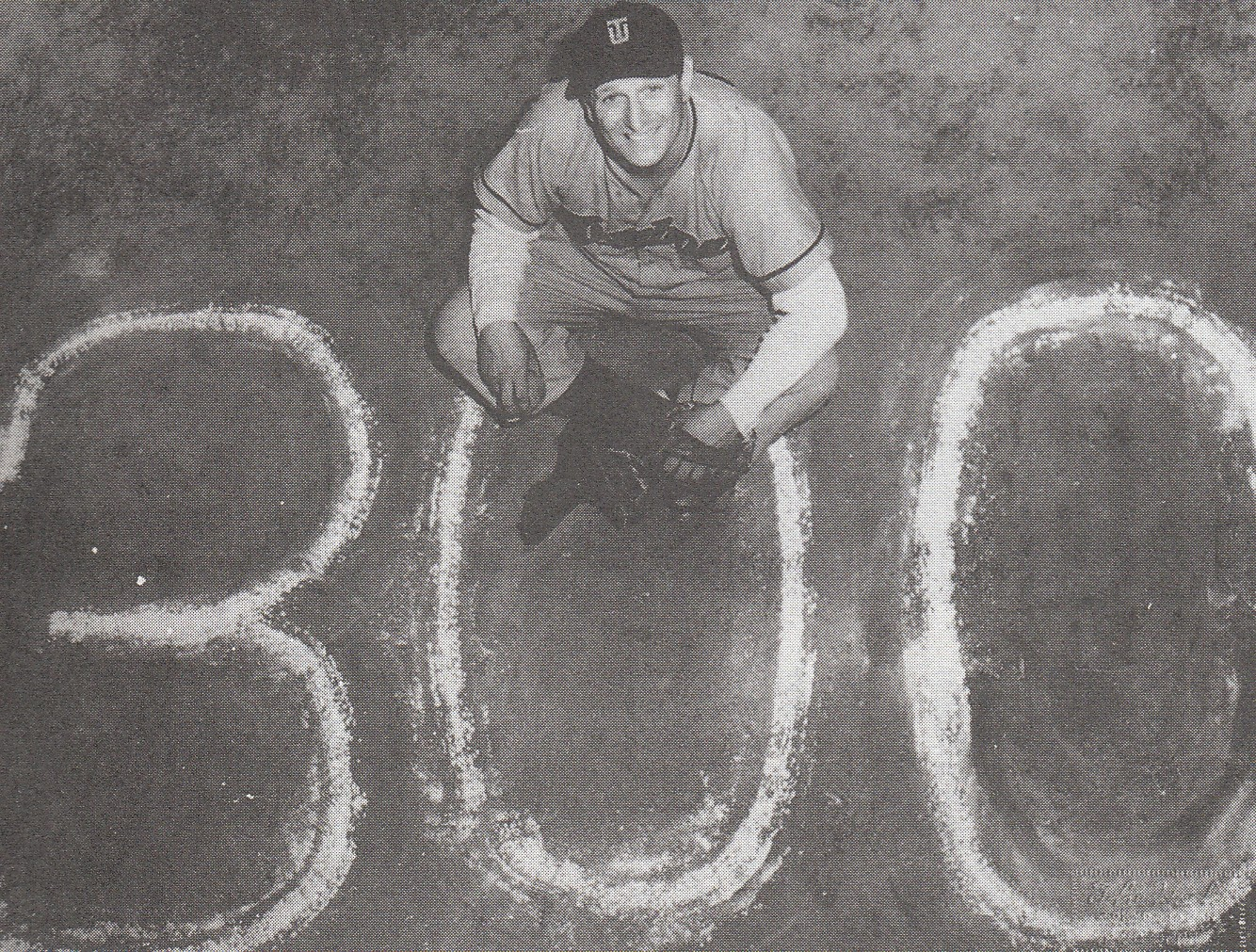
Victor Starffin reaching 300 wins with the Takahashi Unions.

The Pacific League had seven teams since the Japan Baseball League split into the Central and the Pacific League, but having an odd number of teams was inconvenient for scheduling and playoffs. Therefore, in 1953 it was decided that any team which finished below a winning percentage of .350 would be disbanded. However, all the teams finished above the mark (Kintetsu had the worst record at .410) — therefore the league decided to admit an eighth team, the Unions.

The Unions were owned by Ryutaro Takahashi, the former president of Dai-Nippon Beer and owner of the Eagles Baseball Club/Kurowashi Black Eagles from 1939 to 1941. Takahashi had originally wanted to name the Unions the "Takahashi Eagles" after himself and a beer that had been produced by Dai-Nippon. However, the team name ended up being chosen by a public vote.

The team became the Tombo Unions after Tombow Pencil bought a share of the team in 1955, but reverted to its original name after Tombow withdrew before the following year. On September 9, 1955, Victor Starffin pitched for the Unions against the Daiei Stars and won his 300th career game; he went 15-34 for the team before not being signed by any team after he won his 303rd game.

The Unions, now in financial trouble, only lasted one more year before they merged with the Daiei Stars on February 26, 1957, to form the Daiei Unions.

== Nippon Professional Baseball season-by-season records ==
Year	Team name	Wins	Losses	Ties	Win/Loss Percentage	Pacific League Standings	Games behind
1954	Takahashi Unions	53	84	4	.387	6	37
1955	Tombow Unions	42	98	11	.300	8	57
1956	Takahashi Unions	52	98	4	.347	8	45.5
