= Atsushi Aramaki =

Japanese baseball player (1926–1971)

Atsushi Aramaki 荒巻 淳
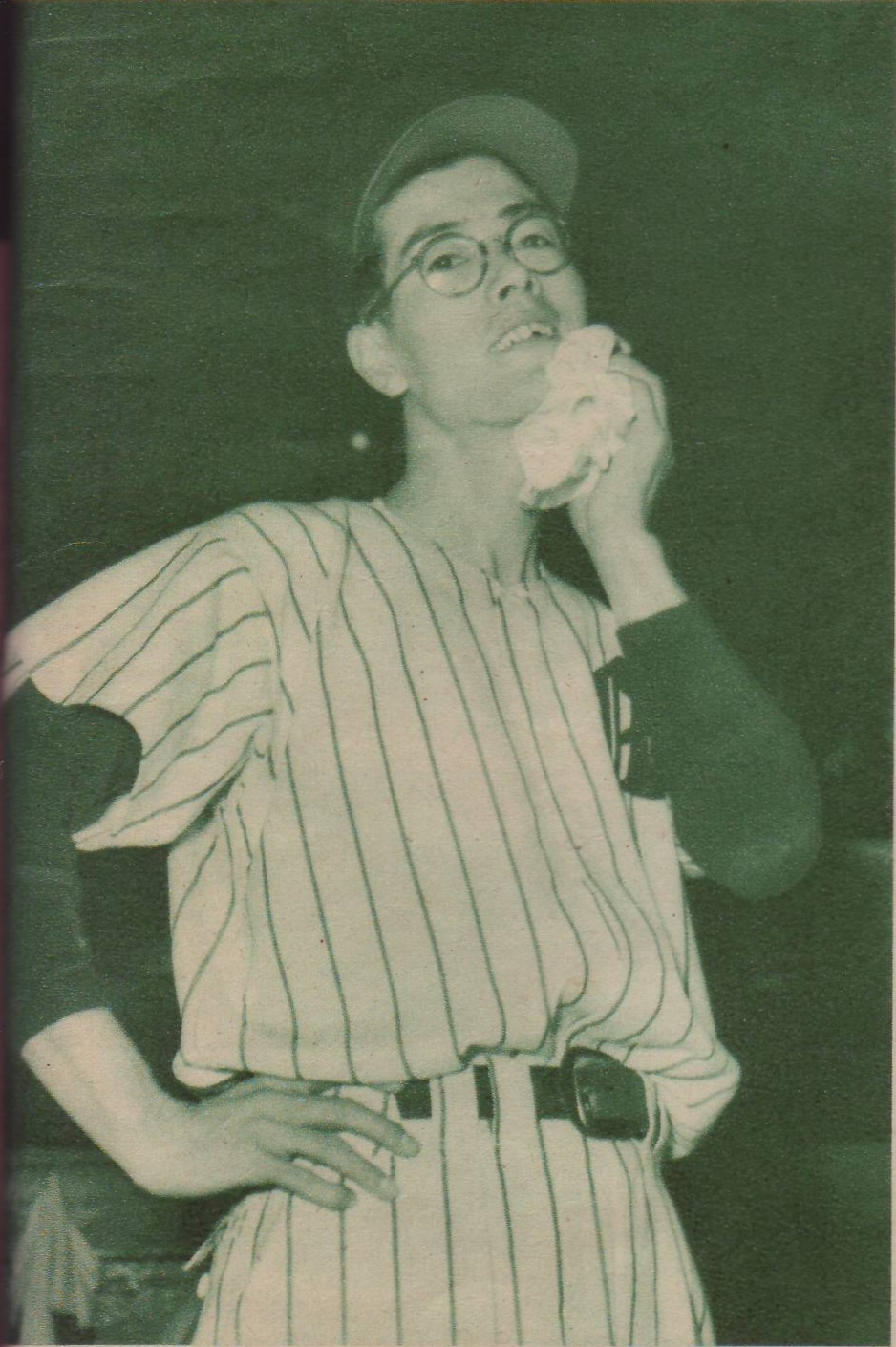
- Atsushi Aramaki
- Pitcher
- Born: February 16, 1926; Ōita, Ōita, Japan
- Died: May 12, 1971 (aged 45)
- Batted: Left Threw: Left

NPB debut
- March 15, 1950, for the Mainichi Orions

Last appearance
- September 25, 1962, for the Hankyu Braves

NPB statistics
- Win–loss record: 173–107
- Earned run average: 2.23
- Strikeouts: 1,069

Teams
- As player: Mainichi Orions/Daimai Orions (1950–1961); Hankyu Braves (1962); As coach: Hankyu Braves (1962–1965); Yakult Atoms (1970–1971)

Career highlights and awards
- Pacific League Rookie of the Year (1950); Pacific League Pitcher Best Nine (1950); Pacific League ERA leader (1950)

Member of the Japanese

Baseball Hall of Fame
- Induction: 1985

Atsushi Aramaki (荒巻 淳, Aramaki Atsushi; February 16, 1926 – May 12, 1971) was a Nippon Professional Baseball pitcher.

== Biography ==
He was named Pacific League Rookie of the Year in 1950. In 1953, he pitched a complete-game victory over the American All-Stars. He was the inaugural Pacific League Rookie of the Year and was selected to the league's Best Nine team.

He became the first Pacific League pitcher to reach 100 career victories.

During his 13-season career (1950–1962), he also played for the Hankyu Braves. After retiring as a player, Aramaki served as a coach for the Hankyu Braves and later the Yakult Atoms.

He was posthumously inducted in the Japanese Baseball Hall of Fame in 1985.
