= Juzo Sanada =

Japanese baseball player and coach

Juzo Sanada 真田 重蔵
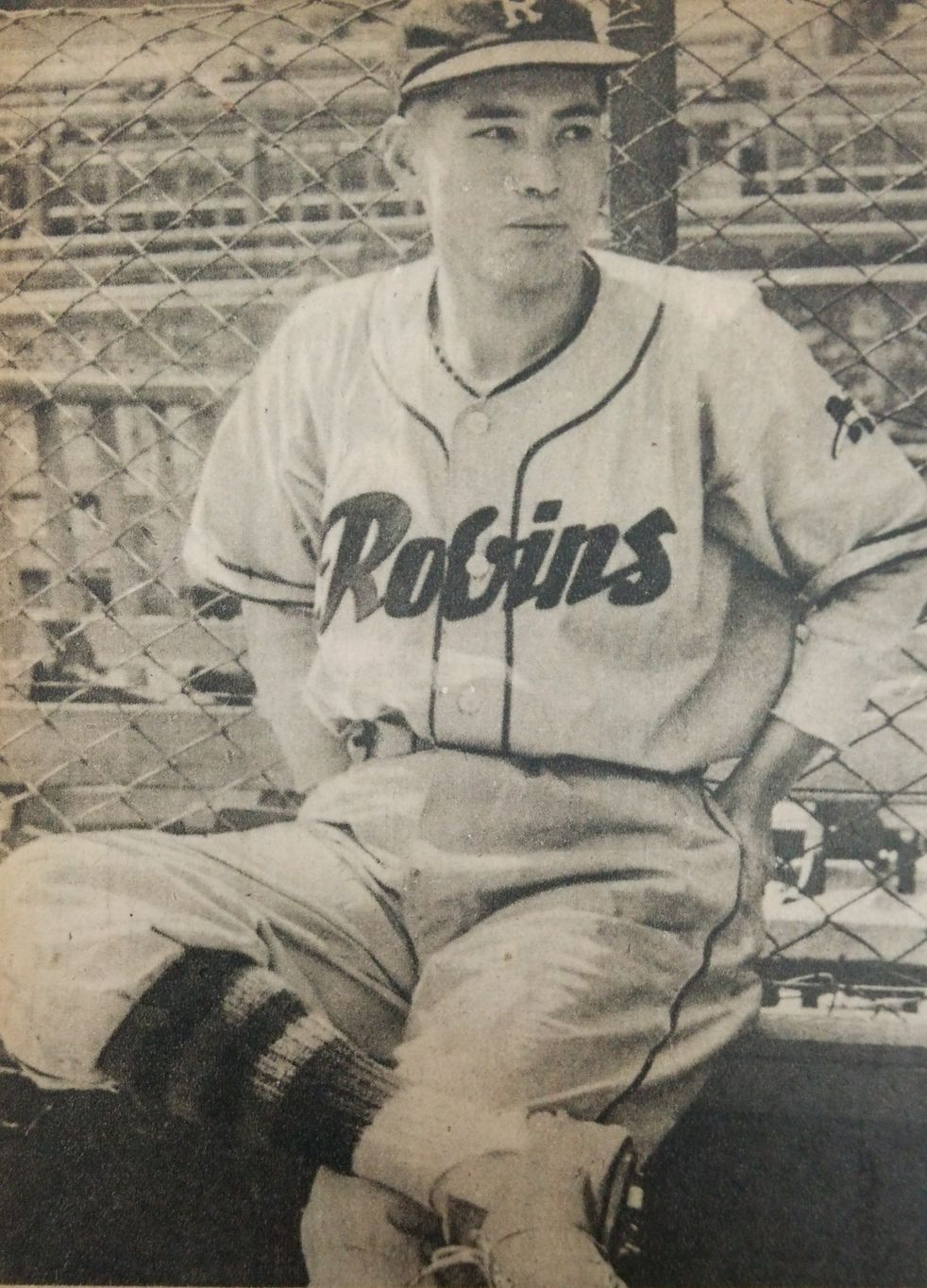
- Juzo Sanada
- Pitcher
- Born: May 27, 1923; Wakayama, Wakayama, Japan
- Died: May 30, 1994 (aged 71)
- Batted: Right Threw: Right

debut
- 1943, for the Asahi Robins

Last appearance
- 1956, for the Osaka Tigers

NPB statistics
- Win–loss record: 178–128
- Earned run average: 2.83
- Strikeouts: 1,083
- Stats at Baseball Reference

Teams
- As player: Asahi/Pacific/Taiyo Robins/Shochiku Robins (1943, 1946–1951); Osaka Tigers (1952–1956); As coach: Tokyo Orions (1964–1965); Hankyu Braves (1966–1971); Kintetsu Buffaloes (1978–1981)

Career highlights and awards
- Pitched two no-hitters

Member of the Japanese

Baseball Hall of Fame
- Induction: 1990

Juzo Sanada (真田 重蔵, Sanada Jūzō; May 27, 1923 – May 30, 1994) was a Nippon Professional Baseball pitcher. From 1948 to 1954 he went by the name of Shigeo Sanada.
