= Daiei Stars =

Japanese baseball team

Information
- League: Nippon Professional Baseball: Pacific League
- Ballpark: Korakuen Stadium
- Established: 1946
- Folded: 1957; merged with the Takahashi Unions to form the Daiei Unions
- Former name(s): Gold Star (1946); Kinsei Stars (1947–1948); Daiei Unions (1956-1957)
- Former league(s): Japanese Baseball League
- Colors: white, red, sky blue
- Ownership: Komajiro Tamura (1946–1948); Daiei Film (1949–1956)
- Manager: Sadayoshi Fujimoto (1948–1956)

The Daiei Stars (大映スターズ, Daiei Sutāzu) were a Japanese professional baseball team that was founded in 1946, and played in various incarnations until 1957, when it merged with another team. Overall, the franchise only had three winning seasons, never rising higher than third place. The team was in the second division, or B-class, for seven seasons, including its last four years of existence. The Stars played in Korakuen Stadium in Bunkyo, Tokyo.

== Franchise history ==
=== Japanese Baseball League ===
The franchise was founded in 1946 as Gold Star, a new post-war team in the Japanese Baseball League. They were owned by textile manufacturer and Lucky Gold Star Telephones owner Komajiro Tamura, who also owned the Pacific Baseball Club (formerly known as the Asahi Baseball Club). Gold Star consisted mostly of former Asahi players and was managed by Asahi's former manager Michinori Tubouchi. In Gold Star's inaugural season, they won 43 games and lost 60, finishing 22 games out of first place. One of the team's losses that season set the record for highest run differential in Japanese professional baseball history.

In 1947 the team became the Kinsei Stars ("Kinsei" meaning made of gold in Japanese) and signed long-time Tokyo Kyojin/Yomiuri Giants pitcher Victor Starffin, who came over from Tamura's other team, the Taiyo Robins (formerly Asahi). Starffin pitched for the franchise for six seasons, winning 80 games and losing 70.

The team acquired Michio Nishizawa mid-season 1946, during the period he was transitioning from a once-dominant pitcher to a fearsome hitter. His two full seasons with the team were unremarkable, however, and he returned to his original team, the Chunichi Dragons in 1949, where he really hit his stride with the bat.

In 1948, the team hired Sadayoshi Fujimoto as manager; he stayed at the helm of the team until partway through their final season, 1956.

In 1949, after being bought by Masaichi Nagata/Daiei Film, the team changed its name to the Daiei Stars, with Nagata serving as team president. Outfielder Makoto Kozuru hit .361 for the Stars in 1949, leading the league in hitting and earning Best Nine Award honors.

=== Nippon Professional Baseball ===
In 1950 the Stars became charter members of the Pacific League when the JBL reorganized into Nippon Professional Baseball and split into the Pacific League and the Central League. Outfielder Shigeya Iijima was a league Best Nine Award-winner in 1950–1951. He led the Pacific League in batting in 1952, hitting .336, while his teammate Giichi Hayashi led the league in innings pitched, with 269-2/3.

=== Merger ===
In 1957, the Stars merged with the Takahashi Unions to form the Daiei Unions. The Unions existed for a single season, finishing last in the Pacific League, at 41-89-2, 43-1/2 games out of first. Pitcher Masayoshi Miura led the Pacific League in losses, with 21.

In 1958, the Unions merged with the Mainichi Orions (founded in 1950) to form the Daimai Orions. This enabled the Pacific League to shrink from the ungainly seven-team arrangement caused by the 1957 merger to a more manageable six teams. The Orions, after a number of relocations and name changes, are now known as the Chiba Lotte Marines.

== Managers ==
- 1946–1947: Michinori Tubouchi
- 1948–1956: Sadayoshi Fujimoto
- 1956–1957: Kenjiro Matsuki

== Season-by-season records ==
Year	League	Team name	Games	Wins	Losses	Ties	Win/Loss Percentage	Standings	Games behind
1946	JBL	Gold Star	105	43	60	2	.417	6	22
1947	JBL	Kinsei Stars	119	41	74	4	.357	8	37.5
1948	JBL	Kinsei Stars	140	60	73	7	.451	7	25.5
1949	JBL	Daiei Stars	134	67	65	2	.508	3	17.5
1950	NPB	Daiei Stars	120	62	54	4	.534	3	19.5
1951	NPB	Daiei Stars	101	41	52	8	.441	4	29.5
1952	NPB	Daiei Stars	121	55	65	1	.458	4	21
1953	NPB	Daiei Stars	120	63	53	4	.543	3	6.5
1954	NPB	Daiei Stars	140	43	92	5	.319	8	46
1955	NPB	Daiei Stars	141	53	87	1	.379	6	46
1956	NPB	Daiei Stars	154	57	94	3	.377	7	41
1957	NPB	Daiei Unions	131	41	89	2	.315	7	43.5
Overall record			1527	626	858	43	.424		
