= Shochiku Robins =

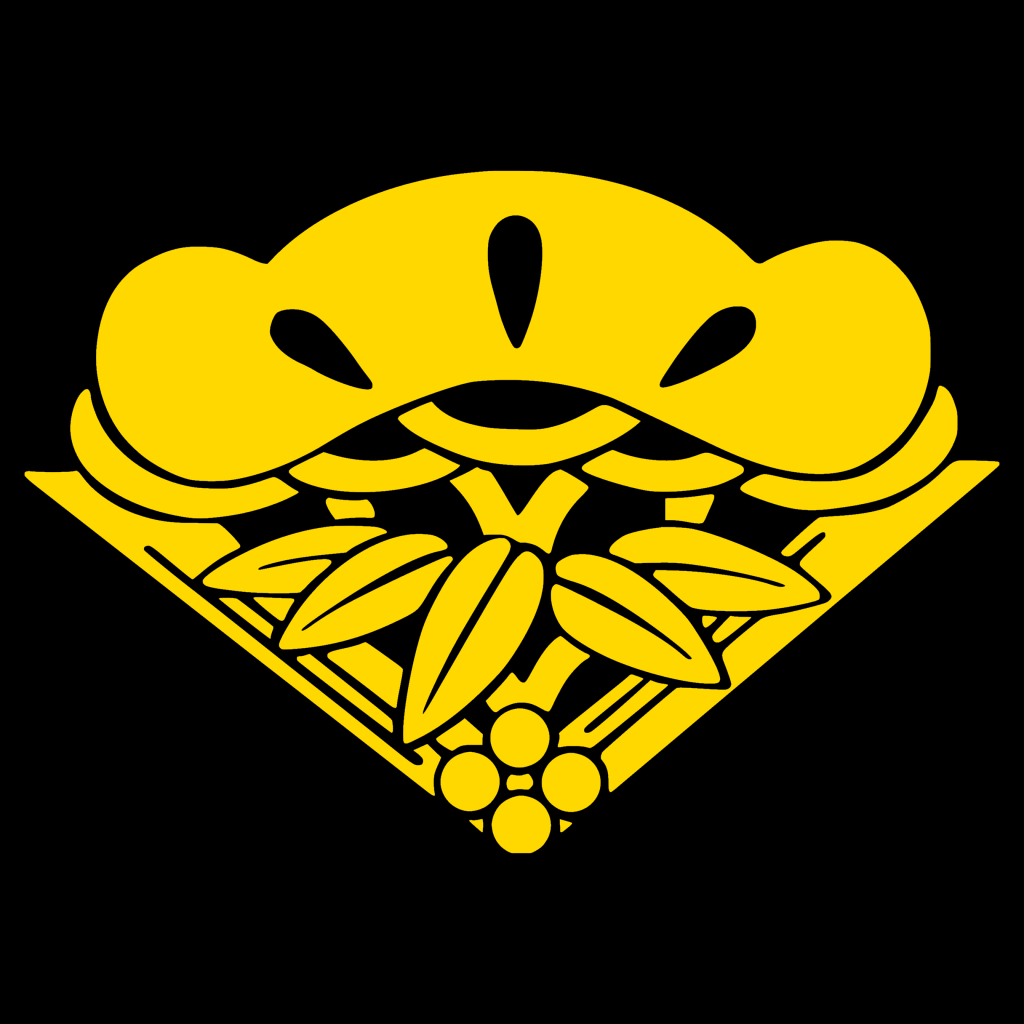
- Cap insignia

Information
- League: Nippon Professional Baseball * Central League
- Ballpark: Shimonoseki Baseball Stadium (1950–1952)
- Established: 1936; 90 years ago
- Division championships: 1 (1950)
- Former name: Dai Tokyo (1936); Lion Baseball Club (1937–1940); Asahi Baseball Club (1941–1944); Pacific Baseball Club (1946); Taiyō Robins (1947–1949)
- Former league: Japanese Baseball League (1936–1949)
- Former ballpark: Kinugasa Stadium
- Colors: dark olive green, red
- Ownership: Kokumin Shimbun (1936); Komajiro Tamura (1937–1952)
- Manager: Tokuro Konishi (1936–1938, 1950, 1952); Kyouichi Nitta (1951–1952)

The Shochiku Robins (Japanese: 松竹ロビンス, romanized: Shōchiku robinsu) were a Japanese baseball team that played in Nippon Professional Baseball (NPB). The franchise originated in the Japanese Baseball League (NPB's predecessor) and existed from 1936–1953, when it merged with the Taiyo Whales. Originally based in Tokyo, the club moved to Osaka in 1941.

== Franchise history ==
=== Japanese Baseball League ===
==== Dai Tokyo ====
The club was founded as Dai Tokyo before the 1936 Japanese Baseball League season, with ownership by the Tokyo daily newspaper Kokumin Shimbun. The team made history that year by signing an African-American player, Jimmy Bonner, 11 years before Jackie Robinson broke the Major League Baseball color barrier.

The worst team in the league its first year, the club improved in spring 1937.

==== Lion ====
On August 31, midway through the 1937 fall season, the team changed its name to the Lion Baseball Club when it was acquired by Komajiro Tamura, with sponsorship by Lion Toothpaste.

Late in the 1940 season, the Japan Baseball League outlawed English nicknames (due to rising tensions with the West). Owner Tamura refused to change the team's name, insisting that "Lion" is Japanese (In actuality, he wanted to honor the team's sponsorship contract with the Lion Corporation.) The team completed the season as Lion, finishing in last place, 50 games behind Tokyo Kyojin.

==== Asahi ====
In 1941 the team moved from Tokyo to Osaka and acquiring new sponsorship from Asahi Shimbun; from 1941 to 1944 it was called the Asahi Baseball Club. In 1943 the team had its first winning season, finishing at 41-36-7.

==== Pacific ====
After the resumption of the Japanese Baseball League in 1946 (after World War II), the team changed its name to Pacific Baseball Club (popularly known as Taihei — "peace"). Meanwhile, team owner Komajiro Tamura started another franchise that season, Gold Star, which signed many of Asahi's former players, as well as Asahi's former manager Michinori Tubouchi.

To fill out its roster, Pacific signed long-time Tokyo Kyojin/Yomiuri Giants pitcher Victor Starffin, as well as some other famous players. These signings led to a serious conflict, and Pacific was forced to forfeit four games that season.

One homegrown player who rose to prominence was pitcher and part-time infielder Juzo Sanada (later known as Shigeo Sanada), who eventually became a four-time 20-game-winner and a member of the Japanese Baseball Hall of Fame.

==== Taiyo Robins ====
English nicknames returned to Japanese baseball after the 1946 season, and the team changed its name to the Taiyo Robins. Still owned by Komajiro Tamura, "Taiyo" came from Tamura's fabric store Taiyo Rayon, and "Robins" from Tamura's personal nickname, "Koma" ("robins" in Japanese). The kanji for "Taiyo" (太陽) has connotations of the sun, and for a brief confusing period the team featured the words "Suns" on its road uniforms and "Robins" on its home uniforms.

Starffin left after the 1947 season, and none of the name variations helped improve the team's play. The JBL reorganized after the 1949 season; the franchise ended its Japanese Baseball League run with a losing season every single year except 1943.

=== Nippon Professional Baseball ===
==== Shochiku Robins ====
In 1950, when the JBL reorganized to become Nippon Professional Baseball, the Robins joined NPB's Central League. A share of the team was sold to the Shochiku Corporation and it became the Shochiku Robins. Amazingly, that year the team won 46 more games than the year before, totaling 98 wins and coming in first in their division. Led by league MVP Makoto Kozuru and his 51 home runs and still-league record 163 RBI, as well as Sanada's 39 victories, the Robins played in the inaugural Japan Series, ultimately falling to the Mainichi Orions, 4 games to 2.

==== Merger with the Taiyo Whales ====
After a mediocre year in 1951, they lost 84 games in 1952. It was decided that any Central League teams ending the season with a winning percentage below .300 would be disbanded or merged with other teams. The Robins fell into this category, and were merged with the Taiyo Whales to become the Taiyo Shochiku Robins in January 1953. The resulting franchise is now known as the Yokohama DeNA BayStars.

== Managers ==
- 1936 (spring): Katsuzo Ito
- 1936 (fall)–1937: Tokuro Konishi
- 1938: Tokuro Konishi/Katsuo Takada
- 1939–1940: Katsuo Takada
- 1941–1943: Aiichi Takeuchi
- 1944: Michinori Tubouchi
- 1946: Sadayoshi Fujimoto
- 1947: Michinori Tubouchi/Sadayoshi Fujimoto
- 1948: Nobuyoshi Hasegawa
- 1949: Shuichi Ishimoto
- 1950: Tokuro Konishi
- 1951: Kyouichi Nitta
- 1952: Kyouichi Nitta/Tokuro Konishi

== Japanese Baseball League season-by-season records ==
Year	Team name	Wins	Losses	Ties	Win/Loss Percentage	Standings	Games behind
1936 (spring)	Dai Tokyo	0	13	1	.000	7	N.A.
1936 (fall)	Dai Tokyo	5	21	2	.192	7	17
1937 (spring)	Dai Tokyo	21	31	4	.404	6	19
1937 (fall)	Lion	19	29	1	.396	6	20
1938 (spring)	Lion	9	26	0	.257	8	20
1938 (fall)	Lion	19	20	1	.487	6	11
1939	Lion	33	58	5	.363	8	32.5
1940	Lion	24	76	4	.240	9	50
1941	Asahi	29	59	1	.298	8	37
1942	Asahi	49	50	4	.495	4	23.5
1943	Asahi	41	36	7	.532	3	11
1944	Asahi	12	22	1	.353	5	15.5
1946	Pacific	42	60	3	.412	8	21.5
1947	Taiyō Robins	50	64	5	.439	8	28
1948	Taiyō Robins	61	74	5	.452	6	25.5
1949	Taiyō Robins	52	81	0	.391	8	33

== Nippon Professional Baseball season-by-season records ==
Year	Team name	Wins	Losses	Ties	Win/Loss Percentage	Central League Standings	Games behind
1950	Shochiku Robins	98	35	4	.737	1	--
1951	Shochiku Robins	53	57	5	.482	4	27
1952	Shochiku Robins	34	84	2	.288	7	48
