= Nippon Professional Baseball =

Highest baseball league in Japan

Nippon Professional Baseball 日本野球機構
- Current season, competition or edition: 2026 NPB season
- Formerly: Japanese Baseball League
- Sport: Baseball
- Founded: Pacific League, November 26, 1949; 76 years ago Central League, December 15, 1949; 76 years ago
- Commissioner: Sadayuki Sakakibara
- No. of teams: 12
- Country: Japan
- Headquarters: 5–36–7 Shiba, Minato-ku, Tokyo
- Confederation: WBSC Asia
- Most recent champions: Fukuoka SoftBank Hawks (13th title)
- Most titles: Yomiuri Giants (22 titles)
- Qualification: Asia Series (2005–2013)
- Broadcasters: Japan: Fuji TV / NHK; TV Asahi / J Sports / TBS; Gaora Sports; Sports Live+; DAZN; International: For the Fans (United States); YouTube
- Website: NPB.jp

Nippon Professional Baseball (日本野球機構(にっぽんやきゅうきこう), Nippon Yakyū Kikō; NPB) is a professional baseball league and the highest level of baseball in Japan. Locally, it is often called Puro Yakyū (プロ野球), meaning simply Professional Baseball; outside of Japan, NPB is often referred to as "Japanese baseball".

The roots of the league can be traced back to the formation of the "Greater Japan Tokyo Baseball Club" (大日本東京野球倶楽部, Dai-Nippon Tōkyō Yakyū Kurabu) in 1934. The first professional circuit for the sport in Japan, the Japanese Baseball League (JBL), was founded two years later and continued to play even through the final years of World War II. The organization that is today's NPB was formed when the JBL reorganized in 1950, dividing its 15 teams into two leagues, which would meet in the annual season-ending Japan Series championship playoff series of games starting that year.

NPB consists of twelve teams divided equally in two leagues, the Central League and the Pacific League, a format which it has largely kept since 1957. It has seen several waves of expansion and contraction, sometimes at the same time, to keep it at those numbers; most recently, in 2005, the Osaka Kintetsu Buffaloes merged with the Orix BlueWave to form the Orix Buffaloes, while the Rakuten Golden Eagles were added as an expansion team. As is common in Asian baseball (and unlike North American leagues), teams are generally named after their corporate owners, such as Yomiuri and Softbank. NPB also oversees two affiliated minor leagues, the Western League and the Eastern League.

Since the first Japan Series in 1950, the Yomiuri Giants have the most championships with 22, and the most appearances with 37. Following the 2026 season, the Fukuoka SoftBank Hawks, who defeated the Yokohama DeNA BayStars 4–0 in the 2026 Japan Series, are the reigning champions. The Japan Series has been contested 77 times as of 2026, with the Pacific League leading the Central League 39–38.

NPB was the only professional sports league in Japan until the foundation of the J.League in 1993. It is the eleventh-wealthiest professional sport league by revenue in the world, and the second-wealthiest baseball league, behind Major League Baseball (MLB); it is also the wealthiest sports league in Asia. NPB has the second-highest total season attendance of any league, also behind MLB, despite playing considerably fewer games per season.

== League structure ==
Nippon Professional Baseball consists of two leagues, the Central League and the Pacific League, which each have six teams. There are also two secondary-level professional minor leagues, the Eastern League and the Western League, that play shorter schedules for developing players in the so called "Farm System". NPB teams are allowed to have more than one minor league team as long as those others are outside of the established farm/minor league system, with the Fukuoka SoftBank Hawks and Yomiuri Giants being the only teams taking advantage of this. As of 2023, the Hawks have three minor league teams, the Giants have two, and the other ten teams only have one minor league team each. Teams below the Eastern and Western Leagues play exhibition matches against various teams of collegiate, industrial, Shikoku Island League Plus, and other NPB minor league statuses.

The Central League and Pacific League operate as separate entities, unlike the four major professional sports leagues of North America and the KBO League in South Korea, whose leagues each operate as one singular entity. As a result, the TV rights for games are always held by a game's home team, except for Japan Series and All-Star Games, which the league owns the rights in a special collaborative system among the 12 teams in order to avoid blackout issues. The Pacific League has used the designated hitter (DH) rule since 1975, while the Central League plans to introduce DH from 2027 season, before it, the Central League has not used the DH outside of interleague play where a Pacific League team is the home team and in the 1985 and 2020 Japan Series.

The season starts in late March or early April, and ends in October, with two or three all-star games in July. In recent decades prior to 2007, the two leagues each scheduled between 130 and 140 regular season games, with the 146 games played by the Central League in 2005 and 2006 being the only exception. Both leagues have since adopted 143-game seasons, 71 or 72 each at home and on road, facing their five respective intra-league opponents 25 times each and facing their six interleague opponents three times each in late May to early June in interleague play, with a separate champion being crowned for the team with the best record through the 18 games of interleague play. In general, Japanese teams play six games a week, with every Monday off (except on specific occasions, such as a game being played outside of the home team's primary stadium or if a rainout forced a game to be postponed to a Monday). Unlike in Major League Baseball and in KBO League, doubleheaders have not been featured in NPB since the late 1990s.

Following the conclusion of each regular season, the top three teams from each league go on to play in the Climax Series playoff tournament, with the winner of each playoff tournament facing off in a best-of-seven championship series known as the Japan Series (also known as the Nippon Series). Implemented in 2004 by the Pacific League (then known as the Pacific League Playoffs) and in 2007 by the Central League, the Climax Series is a two-stage system; in the "first stage", the second and third-place ranking teams face off in a best-of-three series played entirely in the second place team's home stadium. In the case of an instance where the series ends 1–1–1, the higher seed always advances to the final stage. In the "final stage", the winner of the first stage will face off against the league's pennant winner in a best-of-six series played entirely in the pennant winner's home stadium. The higher seed always starts with a "ghost win", or a 1–0 advantage in the series before any games have been played, meaning the higher seed only has to win three games whereas the lower seed has to win four games. In the event of a tie, the higher seed would subsequently only need to win two games. The winners of each league's final stage then face off in the Japan Series, a best-of-seven series mirroring the format of the World Series. In the rare instance where the series ends 3–3–1 after seven games, a Game 8 will be played with unlimited innings at the stadium with home-field advantage. Hypothetically, a Japan Series can go up to 14 games in length if each of the first seven games resulted in a 12-inning tie. Since its inception, home-field advantage alternates from year to year between the CL and PL, with the CL representative getting home-field advantage in even years and the PL representative getting home-field advantage in odd years.

Since its adoption by both leagues in 2007, Climax Series does not determine who won each league's pennant, rather the team with the best regular season record in each league wins the pennant, regardless of their result in the Climax Series. This has led to five occasions where the Japan Series champion did not win their league's pennant that year, with those being the 2007 Chunichi Dragons, 2010 Chiba Lotte Marines, the 2018-2019 Fukuoka SoftBank Hawks and the 2024 Yokohama DeNA BayStars. However, from 2004 to 2006, the winner of the Pacific League Playoffs was given the Pacific League pennant for that year.

== Financial problems ==
Financial problems plague many teams in the league. It is believed that all teams are operating with considerable subsidies, often as much as ¥6 billion (about US$44.9 million), from their parent companies. A raise in the salaries of players is often blamed, but from the start of the professional league, parent companies paid the difference as an advertisement. Most teams have never tried to improve their finances through constructive marketing. In addition, teams in the Central League historically saw much higher profits than the Pacific League, having popular teams such as the Giants and Tigers.

The number of metropolitan areas represented in the league increased from four to five in 1988, when the Nankai Hawks (now Fukuoka SoftBank Hawks) were sold to Daiei and moved to Fukuoka, nine years after the Nishitetsu Lions moved from Fukuoka to Tokorozawa to become the Seibu Lions, and from five to seven between 2003 and 2005, as the Nippon-Ham Fighters moved from Tokyo to Sapporo prior to the 2004 season. The Osaka Kintetsu Buffaloes merged with the Orix BlueWave (becoming the Orix Buffaloes) in the middle of 2004, which caused a player strike that eventually resulted in the creation of the Tōhoku Rakuten Golden Eagles being founded in Sendai to maintain the 12-team balance before the 2005 season.

Until 1993, baseball was the only team sport played professionally in Japan. In that year, the J.League professional association football league was founded. The new league placed teams in prefectural capitals around the country—rather than clustering them in and around Tokyo—and the teams were named after their locations rather than after corporate sponsors, despite many clubs in the J.League still being owned and subsidized by corporate entities.

The wave of players moving to Major League Baseball, which began with Hideo Nomo, with the help of agent Don Nomura, exploiting a loophole, "retiring" from the Kintetsu Buffaloes, then signing with the Los Angeles Dodgers, has also added to the financial problems. Attendance suffered as teams lost their most marketable players, while TV ratings declined as viewers tuned into broadcasts of Major League games. To discourage players from leaving to play in North America, or to at least compensate teams that lose players, Japanese baseball and MLB agreed on a posting system for players under contract. MLB teams wishing to negotiate with a player submit bids for a "posting fee", which the winning MLB team would pay the Japanese team if the player signs with the MLB team. Free agents are not subject to the posting system, however, and some teams almost never post their players.

== History ==
=== Origins ===
The first professional baseball team in Japan with later ties to NPB was founded by media mogul Matsutarō Shōriki in late 1934 and called the Dai Nippon Tokyo Yakyu Kurabu ("the Great Japan Tokyo Baseball Club"). After matching up with a team of visiting American All-Stars that included Babe Ruth, Jimmie Foxx, Lou Gehrig, and Charlie Gehringer, the team spent the 1935 season barnstorming in the U.S., winning 93 of 102 games against semi-pro and Pacific Coast League teams. According to historian Joseph Reaves, "The only minor drawbacks to the team's popularity in the States were their kanji characters and their cumbersome Japanese name. They rectified both by renaming themselves the Tokyo Kyojin ['Tokyo Giants'] and adopting a uniform identical to the New York Giants..."

From 1936 to 1950, professional baseball in Japan was played under the banner of the Japanese Baseball League (JBL). The league's dominant team during this period was the Tokyo Kyojin, which won nine league championships, including six in a row from 1938 to 1943 (The team was officially renamed the Yomiuri Giants in 1947).

=== NPB establishment ===
After the 1949 season, the JBL team owners reorganized into the NPB; Daiei Stars owner Masaichi Nagata promoted a two-league system, which became the Pacific League (initially called the Taiheiyo Baseball Union) and the Central League, with Nagata becoming the first president of the Pacific League. The league now known as Nippon Professional Baseball began play in 1950.

Four JBL teams formed the basis of the Central League: the Chunichi Dragons, the Hanshin Tigers, the Yomiuri Giants, and the Shochiku Robins (formerly the Taiyō Robins). To fill out the league, four new teams were formed: the Hiroshima Carp, the Kokutetsu Swallows, the Nishi Nippon Pirates, and the Taiyō Whales.

Four JBL teams formed the basis of the Pacific League: the Hankyu Braves, the Nankai Hawks, the Daiei Stars, and the Tokyu Flyers. To fill out the league, three new teams were formed: the Kintetsu Pearls, the Mainichi Orions, and the Nishitetsu Clippers.

Matsutarō Shōriki, the Giants' owner, acted as NPB's unofficial commissioner and oversaw the first Japan Series, which featured the Mainichi Orions defeating the Shochiku Robins 4 games to 2.

=== Expansion and contraction ===
The Central League's Nishi Nippon Pirates existed for one season—they placed sixth in 1950, and the following season merged with the Nishitetsu Clippers (also based in Fukuoka) to form the Nishitetsu Lions. This brought the number of Central League teams down to an ungainly arrangement of seven. In 1952, it was decided that any Central League team ending the season with a winning percentage below .300 would be disbanded or merged with other teams. The Shochiku Robins fell into this category, and were merged with the Taiyō Whales to become the Taiyō Shochiku Robins in January 1953. This enabled the Central League to shrink to an even number of six teams.

In 1954 a new Pacific League team was founded, the Takahashi Unions, to increase the number of teams in that division to eight. Although the team was stocked with players from the other Pacific League teams, the Unions struggled from the outset and finished in the second division every season. In 1957, the Unions were merged with the Daiei Stars to form the Daiei Unions (and again bringing the number of Pacific League teams down to seven). The Unions existed for a single season, finishing in last place, 43-1/2 games out of first. In 1958, the Unions merged with the Mainichi Orions to form the Daimai Orions. This enabled the Pacific League to contract from the ungainly seven-team arrangement to six teams.

After these various franchise developments, by the end of the 1950s, Nippon Professional Baseball had contracted from the initial allotment of 15 teams down to the current number of 12.

=== The 1960s, the 1970s, and the Yomiuri Giants' V9 ===
On September 1, 1964, Nankai Hawks' prospect Masanori Murakami became the first Japanese player to play in Major League Baseball when he appeared on the mound for the San Francisco Giants; he returned to Japan in 1966. Disputes over the rights to his contract eventually led to the 1967 United States – Japanese Player Contract Agreement; it would be almost 30 years before another Japanese player played in the Major Leagues.

The Yomiuri Giants had been one of the strongest teams since the days of the Japanese Baseball League (JBL), and after the Japan Series began in 1950, they won the championship six times by 1964. From 1965 to 1973, however, they demonstrated overwhelming dominance by winning nine consecutive Japan Series titles. This remarkable achievement is recorded in Japanese sports history as "V9" (ja).

It was made possible by manager Tetsuharu Kawakami's defense-oriented strategies, along with the performances of the team’s third and fourth hitters, Sadaharu Oh and Shigeo Nagashima, who were collectively known as the "O-N Cannon" (ON砲). Oh set the world record for career home runs during his playing years. Nagashima became a national icon not only for his achievements on the field but also for his playing style and personality, which helped boost the popularity of professional baseball in Japan.

One of the most dramatic moments in Japanese sports history was Nagashima's walk-off home run in the 1959 "Emperor’s Game" (tenran jiai, a game attended by the Emperor). His statement following his retirement in 1974, "My Giants will live on forever" (我がジャイアンツは永久に不滅です), became a well-known phrase in Japanese popular culture. Known throughout his life as "Mr. Baseball" and "Mr. Giants", Nagashima later served as the Giants' honorary lifetime manager. Both Oh and Nagashima were celebrated as national superstars, and each received the People's Honour Award after retiring from active play.

The Black Mist Scandal rocked Nippon Professional Baseball between 1969 and 1971. The fallout from a series of game-fixing scandals resulted in several star players receiving long suspensions, salary cuts, or being banned from professional play entirely; the resulting abandonment of baseball by many fans in Japan also led to the sale of the Nishitetsu Lions and the Toei Flyers.

From 1973 to 1982, in a forerunner to today's Climax Series playoff rounds, the Pacific League employed a split season with the first-half winner playing against the second-half winner in a mini-playoff to determine its champion. In 1975, the Pacific League adopted the designated hitter rule. These were implemented in an attempt to draw fans back to Pacific League, as the Pacific League was hit significantly harder by the Black Mist Scandal than the Central League, with only the Hankyu Braves not having players involved in the incident.

=== 1980s and the "Invincible Seibu" ===
After being a second division team for much of the 1960s and 1970s, in 1983 the Seibu Lions began a period of sustained success. The team gained the moniker "Invincible Seibu" during the 1980s and 1990s due to their sustained domination of the league, winning 11 league championships and eight Japan Series championships between 1982 and 1994. The Lions had a powerful lineup in this period, loaded with sluggers such as Koji Akiyama, Kazuhiro Kiyohara, and Orestes Destrade. Their defense also benefited from the services of skilled players such as Hiromichi Ishige, Hatsuhiko Tsuji and catcher Tsutomu Ito. Among the pitchers employed by the Lions in this period was "The Oriental Express" Taigen Kaku, Osamu Higashio, Kimiyasu Kudoh, Hisanobu Watanabe, and relievers Yoshitaka Katori and Tetsuya Shiozaki.

American expatriate players made their mark in NPB in the 1980s, with players like the Lee brothers (Leron Lee and Leon Lee), Greg "Boomer" Wells, Randy Bass, and Ralph Bryant playing key roles on their NPB teams.

=== Hideo Nomo and the exodus to MLB ===
In 1995, star pitcher Hideo Nomo "retired" from the Kintetsu Buffaloes and signed with the Los Angeles Dodgers. Nomo pitched over the span of 14 seasons in the Major Leagues before retiring in 2008. He won the Rookie of the Year Award in 1995. He twice led the league in strikeouts, and also threw two no-hitters (the only Japanese pitcher to throw a no-hitter in Major League Baseball until Hisashi Iwakuma achieved the feat in August 2015). Nomo's MLB success led to more NPB players moving to Major League Baseball, and eventually led to the creation of the "posting system" in 1998.

Since Nomo's exodus, more than 60 NPB players have played Major League Baseball. Some of the more notable examples include:

- Ichiro Suzuki: After nine years with the Orix BlueWave, in 2001 Ichiro was posted by the BlueWave and claimed by MLB's Seattle Mariners. Ichiro led the American League (AL) in batting average and stolen bases en route to being named AL Rookie of the Year and AL Most Valuable Player. Ichiro, a member of MLB's 3,000-hit club, has established a number of MLB batting records, including the single-season record for hits with 262. He had ten consecutive 200-hit seasons, the longest streak by any player in history. Between his career hits in Japan's and America's major leagues, Ichiro has the most all-time top-flight hits. On August 27, 2022, Ichiro was enshrined in the Seattle Mariners Hall of Fame. On January 21, 2025, Ichiro was elected to Major League Baseball's Hall of Fame by the Baseball Writers' Association of America (BBWAA) in his first year on the ballot, becoming the first Asian-born player to receive American baseball's highest honor.
- Hideki Matsui: The slugger played 10 seasons for the Yomiuri Giants, and then in 2003 moved to MLB, where he starred for the New York Yankees for seven more seasons, including being named the Most Valuable Player for the 2009 World Series. He was the first power hitter from Japan to succeed in Major League Baseball.
- Kazuhiro Sasaki: He is a closer famed for his splitter, known as "The Fang". In 2000, he won the American League Rookie of the Year Award after saving 37 games for the Mariners. In 2001, he was a vital contributor to the Mariners' extremely strong team that won an American League record 116 games, of which he saved 45. In 2001 and 2002, he was an All-Star. After 2003, he returned to Japan to pitch in the NPB until his retirement in 2005.
- Yu Darvish: He spent seven seasons with the Hokkaido Nippon-Ham Fighters before being posted and signing with the Texas Rangers, and later played for the Los Angeles Dodgers, Chicago Cubs, and San Diego Padres. He led Major League Baseball in strikeouts in 2013 with the Rangers and led MLB in wins in 2020 with the Padres. In 2023, he recorded his 100th Major League win, becoming the second Japanese pitcher, after Hideo Nomo, to reach 100 wins in MLB. In 2024, he became the third Japanese pitcher, after Nomo and Hiroki Kuroda, to reach 200 combined wins in NPB and MLB. In the same year, he became the first Japanese pitcher to record 2,000 career strikeouts in MLB.
- Shohei Ohtani: He is a two-way player who was a five-time All-Star while playing for the Hokkaido Nippon-Ham Fighters. Ohtani holds the record for fastest pitch by a Japanese-born player in NPB history at 165 km/h (102.5 mph). After signing with the Los Angeles Angels, Ohtani won the 2018 AL Rookie of the Year award. In 2021, he became the first player in MLB history to be named an All-Star as both a pitcher and a position player. After the conclusion of the season, Ohtani was unanimously named the AL Most Valuable Player. In 2023, Ohtani signed with the Los Angeles Dodgers, in what was then the most expensive contract in sports history, worth $700 million, before Juan Soto surpassed that by $65 million with the New York Mets that offseason. Ohtani would become the first player to record a 50-50 season, winning him his third unanimous MVP.
- Yoshinobu Yamamoto: He played for the Orix Buffaloes from 2017 to 2023, winning the Sawamura Award, the Most Valuable Player Award, the Best Nine Award, and the Golden Glove Award three times each, and is regarded as one of the greatest pitchers in NPB history. After the 2023 season, he signed a 12-year, $325 million contract with the Los Angeles Dodgers, which was the largest contract ever given to a pitcher at the time. He appeared in the 2024 World Series and helped the Dodgers win the championship, becoming the first player in baseball history to win a World Series title, an Olympic gold medal, and a World Baseball Classic title. In the following year’s 2025 World Series, he again played a key role in the Dodgers' championship run and became the second Japanese player, after Hideki Matsui, to be named World Series MVP.

=== Merger and strike of 2004 ===
In September 2004, the professional Japanese players went on strike for the first time in over 70 years. The strike arose from a dispute that took place between the owners of the 12 professional Japanese baseball teams and the players' union (which was led by popular Yakult Swallows player-manager Atsuya Furuta), concerning the merging of the Osaka Kintetsu Buffaloes and the Orix BlueWave. The owners wanted to get rid of the financially defunct Buffaloes, and merge the two baseball leagues, since teams in the Central League saw much higher profits than the Pacific League, having popular teams such as the Yomiuri Giants and Hanshin Tigers. After negotiations, the owners agreed to guarantee the survival of the Chiba Lotte Marines and the Fukuoka Daiei Hawks, leaving the Central League with six teams and the Pacific League with five.

A battle escalated between the players union and the owners, and reached its height when Yomiuri Giants owner Tsuneo Watanabe controversially remarked that Furuta was "a mere player", implying that players had no say in what league would look like the next year. The dispute received huge press coverage (which mostly favored Furuta and the players' union) and was dubbed one of the biggest events in the history of Japanese baseball. Proposals and amendments concerning interleague games, player drafting, and management were also discussed between the players union and the owners during this period.

The strike was originally planned for all Saturday and Sunday games that month, starting from September 11, but was pushed back due to the agreement of another meeting between the union and the owners on September 10. The players decided to strike on September 18–19, 2004, when no progress was made in the negotiations, as there was insufficient time left in the season to hold discussions.

The dispute officially ended after the two groups reached consensus on September 23, 2004. As part of the agreement, the Buffaloes were allowed to merge with the Blue Wave (forming into the Orix Buffaloes); in addition, the Tohoku Rakuten Golden Eagles were newly created (at a reduced "entry fee") to keep the former six-team league structure. Other agreements included the leagues adopting interleague play to help the Pacific League gain exposure by playing the more popular Central league teams. All these changes took place before the 2005 season.

=== Interleague play ===
The two leagues began interleague play in 2005, with each team playing two three-game series (one home, one away) against each of the six teams in the other league. This was reduced to two two-game series in 2007. All interleague play games are played in a seven-week span near the middle of the season.

As of the end of the 2017 season, the Pacific League has won the most games in interleague play since it began in 2005 twelve times, with 2009 being the only time that the Central League has won more games.

=== Post-season/Climax Series ===
After 2004, a three-team playoff system was introduced in the Pacific League, initially dubbed the "Pacific League Championship Series". The teams with the second- and third-best records play in the three-game first stage, with the winner advancing to the five-game final against the top team. The winner becomes the representative of the Pacific League to the Japan Series.

Since the Pacific League won every Japan Series after introducing this league playoff system, an identical system was introduced to the Central League in 2007, and the post-season intra-league games were renamed the "Climax Series" in both leagues.

Player statistics and drafting order based on team records are decided on regular season and are not affected by these postseason games.

=== Recent history ===
In 2011, Miyagi Baseball Stadium, home of the Rakuten Eagles, was badly damaged by the Tōhoku earthquake and tsunami, the stadium was restorated later that year.

The 2013 season featured a livelier baseball, which was secretly introduced into NPB, resulting in a marked increase in home runs league-wide. Tokyo Yakult Swallows outfielder Wladimir Balentien broke the NPB single-season home run record of 55, previously held by professional baseball's all-time home run leader Sadaharu Oh in 1964, Tuffy Rhodes in 2001, and Alex Cabrera in 2002. Balantien finished the season with 60 home runs. Three-term NPB commissioner Ryōzō Katō was forced to resign over the scandal when the changed baseball was revealed.

Former Prime Minister Shinzō Abe's ruling Liberal Democratic Party has proposed expanding NPB to 16 total teams by adding two expansion franchises in each of the country's top-tier professional baseball leagues. The goal of such a move would be to energize the economies of the regions receiving the new teams. Okinawa, Shizuoka, Shikoku, and Niigata have been identified as regions that could play host to said teams.

The 2020 NPB season was delayed numerous times due to the COVID-19 pandemic. Initially preseason games were set to be played without spectators, but with opening day of March 20 remaining unchanged. With the lifting of states of emergency over major Japanese cities, NPB announced that it would begin its regular season on 19 June behind closed doors. "Warm-up" games began 26 May. The shortened 120-game regular season began on 19 June. On 10 July, NPB began allowing a limited number of fans to attend games, with plans to further ease restrictions in the near future. On 19 September, attendance was expanded to a maximum of 20,000 fans per game, or 50% of stadium capacity.

== Expatriate baseball players in Japan ==
For most of its history, NPB regulations imposed "gaijin waku", a limit on the number of non-Japanese people per team to two or three—including the manager and/or coaching staff. Even today, a team cannot have more than four foreign players on a 25-man game roster, although there is no limit on the number of foreign players that it may sign. If there are four, they cannot all be pitchers nor all be position players. This limits the cost and competition for expensive players of other nationalities, and is similar to rules in many European sports leagues' roster limits on non-European players.

Nonetheless, expatriate baseball players in Japan have been a feature of the Japanese professional leagues since 1934. Hundreds of foreigners—particularly Americans—have played NPB. Taiwanese nationals Shosei Go and Hiroshi Oshita both starred in the 1940s. American players began to steadily find spots on NPB rosters in the 1960s. American players hold several NPB records, including highest single-season batting average (Randy Bass, .389), and the dubious record of most strikeouts in a season by a hitter (Ralph Bryant, 204). Americans rank #4 (Tuffy Rhodes, 55) and #7 (Randy Bass, 54) on the list of most home runs in a season, and #2 in single-season RBI (Bobby Rose, 153). Curaçaoan–Dutch outfielder Wladimir Balentien holds the NPB single-season home run record with 60 round-trippers in 2013.

Koreans have had an impact in the NPB as well, including such standout players as Lee Seung-yuop, Sun Dong-yol, Baek In-chun, Lee Jong-beom, and Dae-ho Lee. Venezuelans Alex Ramírez, Alex Cabrera, Bobby Marcano, and Roberto Petagine all had long, successful NPB careers. The Dominican third baseman José Fernández played eleven years in the NPB, compiling a .282 batting average with 206 home runs and 772 runs batted in.

Many of the most celebrated foreign players came to Japan after not finding success in the Major Leagues; see "Big in Japan".

Since the 1970s, foreigners have also made an impact in Nippon Professional Baseball's managing and coaching ranks, with Americans Bobby Valentine and Trey Hillman managing their respective teams to Japan Series championships.

== Teams ==

Team	Location	Stadiums	Capacity	Coordinates	Founded	Manager
Central League
Chunichi Dragons	Nagoya, Aichi	Vantelin Dome Nagoya	40,500	35°11′15.36″N 136°56′57.119″E	January 15, 1936	Kimiyasu Kudoh
Hanshin Tigers	Headquartered in Nishinomiya, Hyōgo; Plays in Hyōgo and Osaka	Koshien Stadium (primary); Kyocera Dome Osaka (during Kōshien baseball tournaments)	47,757; 36,477	34°43′16.34″N 135°21′41.84″E; 34°40′9.48″N 135°28′33.97″E	December 10, 1935	Kyuji Fujikawa
Hiroshima Toyo Carp	Hiroshima, Hiroshima	Mazda Zoom-Zoom Stadium Hiroshima	32,000	34°23′33″N 132°29′2.4″E	December 5, 1949	Takahiro Arai
Tokyo Yakult Swallows	Shinjuku, Tokyo	Meiji Jingu Stadium	37,933	35°40′28.3″N 139°43′1.4″E	January 12, 1950	Takahiro Ikeyama
Yokohama DeNA BayStars	Yokohama, Kanagawa	Yokohama Stadium	30,000	35°26′36.34″N 139°38′24.36″E	December 15, 1949	Ryoji Aikawa
Yomiuri Giants	Bunkyō, Tokyo	Tokyo Dome	46,000	35°42′20″N 139°45′7″E	December 26, 1934	Hideki Matsui
Pacific League
Chiba Lotte Marines	Chiba, Chiba	ZOZO Marine Stadium	30,000	35°38′42.86″N 140°1′51.32″E	November 26, 1949	Saburo Omura
Fukuoka SoftBank Hawks	Fukuoka, Fukuoka	Mizuho PayPay Dome Fukuoka	40,142	33°35′43″N 130°21′44″E	February 22, 1938	Hiroki Kokubo
Hokkaido Nippon-Ham Fighters	Kitahiroshima, Hokkaido	Es Con Field Hokkaido	35,000	42°59′23″N 141°32′58″E	November 6, 1945	Tsuyoshi Shinjo
Orix Buffaloes	Headquartered in Osaka; Plays in Osaka and Kobe	Kyocera Dome Osaka; Hotto Motto Field	36,477; 35,000	34°40′9.48″N 135°28′33.97″E; 34°40′50.37″N 135°4′24.3″E	January 23, 1936	Mamoru Kishida
Saitama Seibu Lions	Tokorozawa, Saitama	Belluna Dome	33,921	35°46′6.6″N 139°25′13.8″E	November 26, 1949	Fumiya Nishiguchi
Tohoku Rakuten Golden Eagles	Sendai, Miyagi	Rakuten Mobile Saikyo Park Miyagi	30,508	38°15′22.34″N 140°54′9″E	November 2, 2004	Masato Yoshii (interim)

The Tokyo Yakult Swallows, Yomiuri Giants and Chiba Lotte Marines plan to build new stadiums. The Swallows' new stadium will be next to its current venue, exchanging places with the Prince Chichibu Rugby Stadium. Meanwhile, the Giants' stadium will be where the old Tsukiji fish market existed.

The Marines plan to build a new 33,000 open-roof stadium next to the Makuhari Messe. The new stadium will change places with one of the Messe's parking lot zones and will based on the ES-Con field model of "a stadium that works 365/366 days in the year".

All the future stadiums are scheduled to be completed around 2030.

Defunct clubs
Team	City	Stadium	Founded	Ceased operations	Notes
Nishi Nippon Pirates	Fukuoka, Fukuoka	52 stadiums in 29 prefectures across Japan	1950	January 30, 1951	Merged with the Nishitetsu Clippers to form the Fukuoka Nishitetsu Lions (now known as the Saitama Seibu Lions)
Shochiku Robins	Kyoto, Kyoto	Kinugasa Stadium	1936	January 1, 1953	Merged with the Taiyo Whales to form the Taiyo-Shochiku Robins (now known as the Yokohama DeNA BayStars)
Takahashi Unions	Kawasaki, Kanagawa	Kawasaki Stadium	1954	February 25, 1957	Merged with the Daiei Stars to form the Daiei Unions
Daiei Unions	Bunkyō, Tokyo	Korakuen Stadium	1946	November 24, 1957	Merged with the Mainichi Orions to form the Daimai Orions (now known as the Chiba Lotte Marines)
Osaka Kintetsu Buffaloes	Osaka, Osaka	Kyocera Dome Osaka	1949	December 1, 2004	Merged with the Orix BlueWave to form the Orix Buffaloes

=== Franchise locations ===
Locations are listed from north to south. Only the most prominent names of each franchise are listed.

Locality	1950	1951–1952	1953	1954	1955–1956	1957	1958–1972	1973–1977	1978	1979–1988	1989–2003	2004	2005–present
Greater Sapporo												Hokkaido Nippon-Ham Fighters (PL), 2004–present (Note: Based in Kitahiroshima since 2023)	
Sendai								Lotte Orions (PL), 1973–1977					Tohoku Rakuten Golden Eagles (PL), 2005–present
Greater Tokyo	Kokutetsu Swallows / Sankei Atoms / Yakult Swallows (CL), 1950–present												
Greater Tokyo	Yomiuri Giants (CL), 1950–present												
Greater Tokyo	Toei Flyers / Nippon-Ham Fighters (PL), 1950–2003												
Greater Tokyo	Mainichi/Daimai/Tokyo/Lotte Orions (PL), 1950–1972								Lotte Orions / Chiba Lotte Marines (PL), 1978–present				
Greater Tokyo				Takahashi Unions (PL), 1954–1956		Daiei Unions (PL), 1957				Saitama Seibu Lions (PL), 1979–present			
Greater Tokyo	Daiei Stars (PL), 1950–1956					Daiei Unions (PL), 1957				Saitama Seibu Lions (PL), 1979–present			
Greater Tokyo					Taiyo Whales / Yokohama BayStars (CL), 1955–present								
Nagoya	Chunichi Dragons (CL), 1950–present												
Greater Osaka	Hanshin Tigers (CL), 1950–present												
Greater Osaka	Hankyu Braves / Orix BlueWave (PL), 1950–2004												Orix Buffaloes (PL), 2005–present
Greater Osaka	Osaka Kintetsu Buffaloes (PL), 1950–2004												Orix Buffaloes (PL), 2005–present
Greater Osaka	Nankai Hawks (PL), 1950–1988												
Greater Osaka	Shochiku Robins (CL), 1950–1954												
Hiroshima	Hiroshima Toyo Carp (CL), 1950–present												
Shimonoseki	Taiyo Whales (CL), 1950–1952												
Fukuoka	Nishitetsu Lions (PL), 1950–1978										Fukuoka Daiei/SoftBank Hawks (PL), 1989–present		
Fukuoka	Nishi Nippon Pirates (CL), 1950												

== Champions ==
Team	Champions	Runners-up	Winning seasons	Runners-up seasons
Yomiuri Giants	22	14	1951, 1952, 1953, 1955, 1961, 1963, 1965, 1966, 1967, 1968, 1969, 1970, 1971, 1972, 1973, 1981, 1989, 1994, 2000, 2002, 2009, 2012	1956, 1957, 1958, 1959, 1976, 1977, 1983, 1987, 1990, 1996, 2008, 2013, 2019, 2020
Saitama Seibu Lions	13	8	1956, 1957, 1958, 1982, 1983, 1986, 1987, 1988, 1990, 1991, 1992, 2004, 2008	1954, 1963, 1985, 1993, 1994, 1997, 1998, 2002
Fukuoka SoftBank Hawks	13	10	1959, 1964, 1999, 2003, 2011, 2014, 2015, 2017, 2018, 2019, 2020, 2025, 2026	1951, 1952, 1953, 1955, 1961, 1965, 1966, 1973, 2000, 2024
Tokyo Yakult Swallows	6	3	1978, 1993, 1995, 1997, 2001, 2021	1992, 2015, 2022
Orix Buffaloes	5	10	1975, 1976, 1977, 1996, 2022	1967, 1968, 1969, 1971, 1972, 1978, 1984, 1995, 2021, 2023
Chiba Lotte Marines	4	2	1950, 1974, 2005, 2010	1960, 1970
Hiroshima Toyo Carp	3	5	1979, 1980, 1984	1975, 1986, 1991, 2016, 2018
Hokkaido Nippon-Ham Fighters	3	4	1962, 2006, 2016	1981, 2007, 2009, 2012
Yokohama DeNA BayStars	3	2	1960, 1998, 2024	2017, 2026
Chunichi Dragons	2	8	1954, 2007	1974, 1982, 1988, 1999, 2004, 2006, 2010, 2011
Hanshin Tigers	2	6	1985, 2023	1962, 1964, 2003, 2005, 2014, 2025
Tohoku Rakuten Golden Eagles	1	0	2013	—
Osaka Kintetsu Buffaloes	0	4	—	1979, 1980, 1989, 2001
Shochiku Robins	0	1	—	1950

== Awards ==
- Nippon Professional Baseball Most Valuable Player Award
- Nippon Professional Baseball Rookie of the Year Award
- Nippon Professional Baseball Comeback Player of the Year Award
- Eiji Sawamura Award (starting pitcher of the year)
- Mitsui Golden Glove Award
- Golden Spirit Award
- Matsutaro Shoriki Award
- Japan Series Most Valuable Player
- Nippon Professional Baseball All-Star Game Most Valuable Player

== Records ==
=== Single season batting ===
Central League			Pacific League			Overall		
Player		Year	Player		Year	Player		Year
Batting Average
(United States) Randy Bass	.389	1986	(Japan) Ichiro Suzuki	.387	2000	(United States) Randy Bass	.389	1986
(United States) Warren Cromartie	.378	1989	(Japan) Ichiro Suzuki	.385	1994	(Japan) Ichiro Suzuki	.387	2000
(Japan) Seiichi Uchikawa	.378	2008	(South Korea) Isao Harimoto ^{a}	.383	1970	(Japan) Ichiro Suzuki	.385	1994
Home Runs
(Netherlands) Wladimir Balentien ^{b}	60	2013	(United States) Tuffy Rhodes	55	2001	(Netherlands) Wladimir Balentien	60	2013
(Japan) Munetaka Murakami	56	2022	(Venezuela) Alex Cabrera	55	2002	(Japan) Munetaka Murakami	56	2022
(Taiwan) Sadaharu Oh ^{c}	55	1964	(Japan) Katsuya Nomura	52	1963	(Taiwan) Sadaharu Oh	55	1964
			(Japan) Hiromitsu Ochiai	52	1985	(United States) Tuffy Rhodes	55	2001
						(Venezuela) Alex Cabrera	55	2002
RBIs
(Japan) Makoto Kozuru	161	1950	(Japan) Hiromitsu Ochiai	146	1985	(Japan) Makoto Kozuru	161	1950
(United States) Bobby Rose	153	1999	(Japan) Katsuya Nomura	135	1963	(United States) Bobby Rose	153	1999
(Japan) Makoto Imaoka	147	2005	(Japan) Norihiro Nakamura	132	2001	(Japan) Makoto Imaoka	147	2005
Hits
(United States) Matt Murton	214	2010	(Japan) Shogo Akiyama	216	2015	(Japan) Shogo Akiyama	216	2015
(Japan) Nori Aoki	209	2010	(Japan) Ichiro Suzuki	210	1994	(United States) Matt Murton	214	2010
(Venezuela) Alex Ramírez ^{d}	204	2007	(Japan) Tsuyoshi Nishioka	206	2010	(Japan) Ichiro Suzuki	210	1994
Stolen Bases
(Japan) Tadashi Matsumoto	76	1983	(Japan) Yutaka Fukumoto	106	1972	(Japan) Yutaka Fukumoto	106	1972
(Japan) Jiro Kanayama	74	1950	(Japan) Yutaka Fukumoto	95	1973	(Japan) Yutaka Fukumoto	95	1973
(Japan) Yoshihiko Takahashi	73	1985	(Japan) Yutaka Fukumoto	94	1974	(Japan) Yutaka Fukumoto	94	1974
Strikeouts
(Japan) Munetaka Murakami	184	2019	(United States) Ralph Bryant	204	1993	(United States) Ralph Bryant	204	1993
(Japan) Akinori Iwamura	173	2004	(United States) Ralph Bryant	198	1990	(United States) Ralph Bryant	198	1990
(Japan) Teruaki Sato	173	2021	(United States) Ralph Bryant	187	1989	(United States) Ralph Bryant	187	1989

^{a} Harimoto is a Korean citizen who was born and grew up in Japan (see Zainichi Korean).
^{b} As all Curaçaoans have Dutch citizenship and Balentien has represented the Netherlands internationally, he is listed here as Dutch.
^{c} Despite being born in Japan, Oh was a citizen of the Republic of China (his father's nationality) instead of Japan.
^{d} Ramirez did not have Japanese citizenship until 2019 and so is listed as the nationality he was during his playing career.

=== Single season pitching ===
Central League			Pacific League			Overall		
Player		Year	Player		Year	Player		Year
ERA
(Japan) Minoru Murayama	0.98	1970	(Japan) Kazuhisa Inao	1.06	1956	(Japan) Minoru Murayama ^{d}	0.98	1970
(Japan) Minoru Murayama	1.19	1959	(Japan) Masahiro Tanaka	1.272	2011	(Japan) Kazuhisa Inao	1.06	1956
(Japan) Minoru Murayama	1.20	1962	(Japan) Masahiro Tanaka	1.273	2013	(Japan) Minoru Murayama	1.19	1959
Wins
(Japan) Juzo Sanada	39	1950	(Japan) Kazuhisa Inao	42	1961	(Japan) Kazuhisa Inao ^{e}	42	1961
(Japan) Hiroshi Gondo	35	1961	(Japan) Tadashi Sugiura	38	1959	(Japan) Juzo Sanada	39	1950
(Japan) Takehiko Bessho	33	1952	(Japan) Kazuhisa Inao	35	1957	(Japan) Tadashi Sugiura	38	1959
Saves
(Japan) Hitoki Iwase	46	2005	(United States) Dennis Sarfate	54	2017	(United States) Dennis Sarfate	54	2017
(Japan) Kyuji Fujikawa	46	2007	(United States) Dennis Sarfate	43	2016	(Japan) Hitoki Iwase	46	2005
(Japan) Kazuhiro Sasaki	45	1998	(United States) Dennis Sarfate	41	2015	(Japan) Kyuji Fujikawa	46	2007
Strikeouts
(Japan) Yutaka Enatsu	401	1968	(Japan) Kazuhisa Inao	353	1961	(Japan) Yutaka Enatsu	401	1968
(South Korea) Masaichi Kaneda ^{f}	350	1955	(Japan) Tadashi Sugiura	336	1959	(Japan) Kazuhisa Inao	353	1961
(Japan) Yutaka Enatsu	340	1970	(Japan) Kazuhisa Inao	334	1958	(South Korea) Masaichi Kaneda	350	1955

^{d} The Japanese record is 0.73, set by Hideo Fujimoto in the 1943 Japanese Baseball League season, which is also the world record ERA, surpassing Tim Keefe's 0.86 of the Troy Trojans in 1880.
^{e} The Japanese record is shared between Inao and Victor Starffin, who also recorded 42 wins during the 1942 Japanese Baseball League season.
^{f} Despite being born in Japan, Kaneda did not become a Japanese citizen until 1959 and was instead a South Korean citizen.

=== Career batting ===
Player		Years played
Batting average
(United States) Leron Lee	.320	1977–1987
(Japan) Tsutomu Wakamatsu	.31918	1971–1989
(South Korea) Isao Harimoto	.31915	1959–1981
(United States) Greg Wells	.317	1983-1992
Home Runs Main article: List of top Nippon Professional Baseball home run hitters
(Taiwan) Sadaharu Oh	868	1959–1980
(Japan) Katsuya Nomura	657	1954–1980
(Japan) Hiromitsu Kadota	567	1970–1992
Hits Main article: List of Nippon Professional Baseball career hits leaders
(South Korea) Isao Harimoto	3,085	1959–1981
(Japan) Katsuya Nomura	2,901	1954–1980
(Taiwan) Sadaharu Oh	2,786	1959–1980
RBIs Main article: List of Nippon Professional Baseball players with 1,000 runs batted in
(Taiwan) Sadaharu Oh	2,170	1959–1980
(Japan) Katsuya Nomura	1,988	1954–1980
(Japan) Hiromitsu Kadota	1,678	1970–1992
Stolen Bases
(Japan) Yutaka Fukumoto	1,065	1969–1988
(Japan) Yoshinori Hirose	596	1955–1977
(Japan) Isao Shibata	579	1962–1981
Strikeouts
(Japan) Takeya Nakamura	2,149	2002-now
(Japan) Kazuhiro Kiyohara	1,955	1986–2008
(Japan) Motonobu Tanishige	1,838	1989–2015
OPS
(Taiwan) Sadaharu Oh	1.080	1959–1980
(Japan) Hideki Matsui	.995	1993–2002
(Venezuela) Alex Cabrera	.990	2001–2012

=== Career pitching ===
Player		Years played
ERA
(Japan) Hideo Fujimoto	1.90	1942–1955
Wins
(Japan) Masaichi Kaneda	400	1950–1969
(Japan) Tetsuya Yoneda	350	1956–1977
(Japan) Masaaki Koyama	320	1953–1973
(Japan) Keishi Suzuki	317	1966–1985
(Japan) Takehiko Bessho	310	1942–1960
(Soviet Union) Victor Starffin	303	1936–1955
Strikeouts
(Japan) Masaichi Kaneda	4490	1950–1969
(Japan) Tetsuya Yoneda	3388	1956–1977
(Japan) Masaaki Koyama	3159	1953–1973
(Japan) Keishi Suzuki	3061	1966–1985
Saves
(Japan) Hitoki Iwase	407	1999–2018
(Japan) Shingo Takatsu	286	1991–2003, 2006–2007
(Japan) Kazuhiro Sasaki	252	1990–1999, 2004–2005

== International play ==
The Japan national baseball team, long composed of amateur players, began to include NPB players in the 2000 Sydney Olympics, and has been composed of NPB players only since the 2004 Athens Olympics. As of 2023, the Japan national baseball team composed of NPB players had won three World Baseball Classics, one WBSC Premier 12, and one Olympic Games, and was ranked No. 1 in the WBSC World Rankings.

Since 1986 an All-Star team from Major League Baseball (MLB) is sent to a biennial end-of-the-season tour of Japan, dubbed as MLB Japan All-Star Series, playing exhibition games in a best-of format against the All-Stars from NPB or recently as of 2014 the national team Samurai Japan.

The 2014 series also celebrated the 80th anniversary of the establishment of Japan's professional baseball by holding an exhibition game of a joint team of Hanshin Tigers and Yomiuri Giants against the MLB All-Stars at the Koshien Stadium on November 11, 2014.

== Agreement and systems ==
- Nippon Professional Baseball Agreement
- Nippon Professional Baseball rosters
- Registration of players under control
- Developmental player system
- Nippon Professional Baseball draft

== See also ==
- Comparison of Major League Baseball and Nippon Professional Baseball
- High school baseball in Japan
- Japanese Baseball Hall of Fame
- List of Japanese baseball players
- List of Japanese players in Major League Baseball
- Shikoku Island League Plus (Regional professional league)
- List of Nippon Professional Baseball mascots
