= Best Nine Award =

Japanese baseball award

- Sport: Baseball
- League: Nippon Professional Baseball
- Awarded for: Best player at each position in the Pacific League and Central League

History
- First award: 1950–present (NPB); 1940, 1947–1949 (JBL)

The Best Nine Award is an annual Nippon Professional Baseball (NPB) honor bestowed upon the best players across the Central League and Pacific League at each position during the season. As determined by a pool of journalists, one player from each position, plus one for the designated hitter in the Pacific League since 1975, is selected for the honor. The Central League plans to utilize the designated hitter starting in the 2027 season, which may possibly mean that they may amend the Best Nine Award to accommodate for a best player at the DH position just like the Pacific League does.

== History ==
While the Best Nine Award was first presented to players following the 1940 season, it was not until 1947 (after World War II) that it became an annual award. After the Japanese Baseball League was divided into Central and Pacific leagues in 1950, the award was presented to nine players from each league. Following the Pacific League's adoption of the DH rule in 1975, ten players (including the best designated hitter) have been chosen for the Best Nine Award in the Pacific League alone each year.

== Selection process ==
Journalists vote on the best pitcher, catcher, first baseman, second baseman, third baseman, shortstop, and three outfielders (typically chosen on merit of best offensive numbers, with the exception of pitchers) in each of the two leagues. As is the case with the Silver Slugger Award, said to be the Major League equivalent of the award, left fielders, center fielders, and right fielders are not chosen separately.

Voters for the award are chosen from journalists employed by national newspaper, broadcast, or communication outlets with five or more years of experience in covering professional baseball. Each voter selects one player at each position in each league; the player with the most votes at each position receives the Best Nine Award. Until 2004, the winning players of the award were announced two days after the final game of the Japan Series; from 2005 onwards, the winners have been announced at the Professional Baseball Convention, the NPB's annual awards ceremony.

Because of the nature of the voting process, it is possible, although exceedingly rare, that two or more players may end up with the same number of votes at any given position. In 2004, Masahiro Araki of the Chunichi Dragons and Greg LaRocca, then of the Hiroshima Carp, were tied for most votes for the Central League second baseman (each received 80 votes from the 190 total votes), the first time a tie had occurred since the current two-league system was adopted.

In addition, it is also possible that a player ends up with the most votes at more than one position in the same season. In 1966, then-Nankai Hawks infielder Yasuhiro Kunisada ended up with the most votes at both second base and third base in the Pacific League. He only received the award at second base, and the award for best third baseman went to Tony Roig of the Nishitetsu Lions. In 2016, Shohei Ohtani of Hokkaido Nippon-Ham Fighters received the awards at pitcher and DH.

== Other notes ==
In the Central League, the pitcher that receives the Best Nine Award is also named the league's Most Valuable Pitcher. This is not the case in the Pacific League, where the pitcher with the highest winning percentage (among those that have thrown the required number of innings) is named the Most Valuable Pitcher.

== Key ==
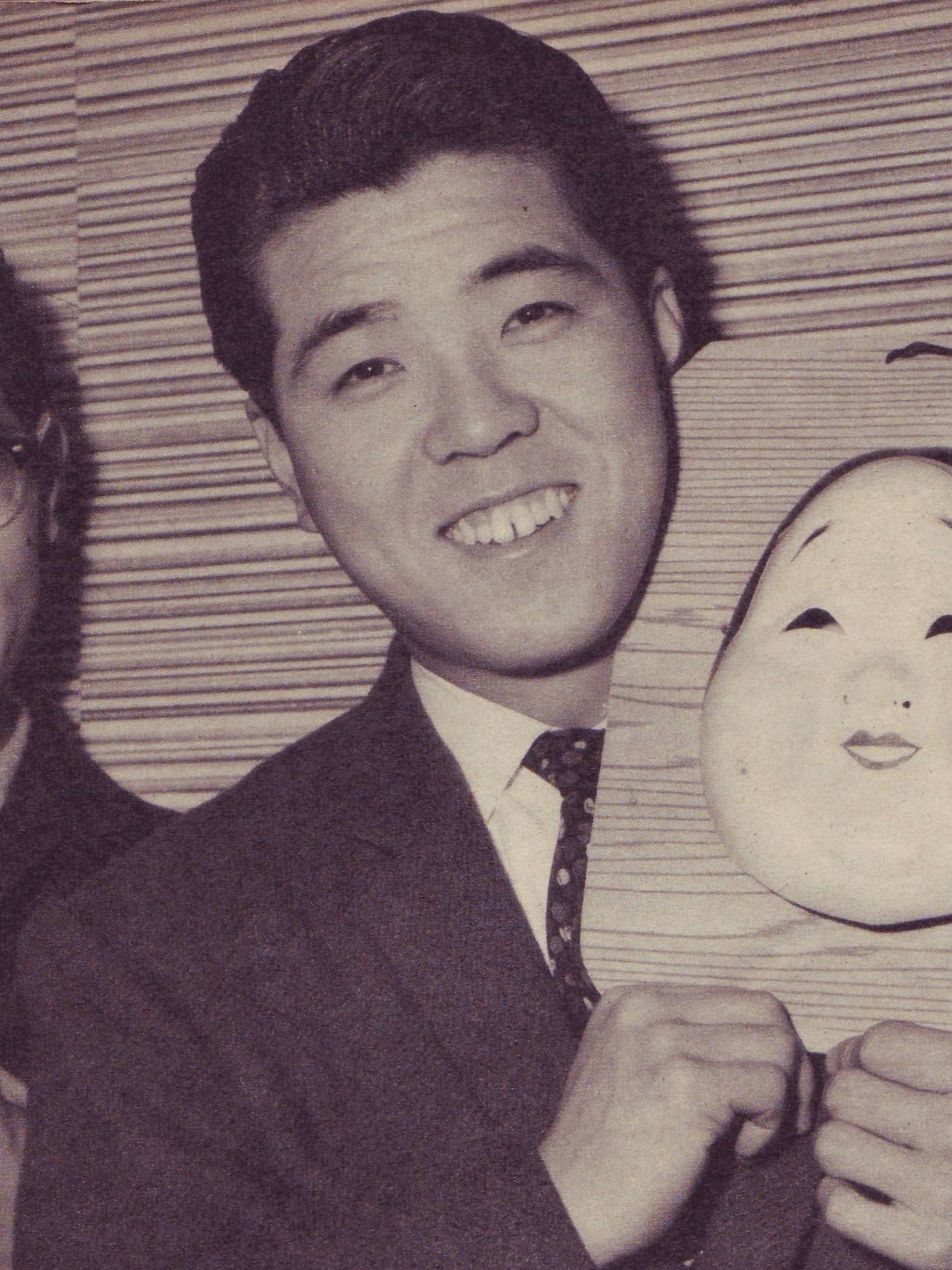
Katsuya Nomura was given the Best Nine Award 19 times as a catcher, which is the most for his position and the most for any player in NPB history.

Year	Links to the corresponding Nippon Professional Baseball season
1B	First baseman
2B	Second baseman
3B	Third baseman
SS	Shortstop
OF	Outfielder
C	Catcher
P	Pitcher
DH	Designated hitter
*	Winner of the most Best Nine Awards at his position (* indicates tie)
†	Member of the Japanese Baseball Hall of Fame

== List of Best Nine Award winners ==
=== Japanese Baseball League (1940, 1947–1949) ===
Year	P	C	1B	2B	3B	SS	OF	OF	OF	Ref
1940	Victor Starffin† (Kyojin)	Yoshio Tanaka (Hanshin Club)	Tetsuharu Kawakami† (Kyojin)	Hisanori Karita (Tsubasa)	Shigeru Mizuhara† (Kyojin)	Fujio Ueda (Hankyu)	Kazuo Kito (Lion)	Haruyasu Nakajima† (Kyojin)	Den Yamada (Hankyu)	
1947	Takehiko Bessho† (Nankai Hawks)	Takeshi Doigaki (Osaka Tigers)	Tetsuharu Kawakami† (Yomiuri Giants)	Shigeru Chiba * (Yomiuri Giants)	Fumio Fujimura (Osaka Tigers)	Kiyoshi Sugiura (Chunichi Dragons)	Masayasu Kaneda (Osaka Tigers)	Hiroshi Oshita (Tokyu Flyers)	Michinori Tsubouchi (Yomiuri Giants)	
1948	Takehiko Bessho† (Nankai Hawks); Hiroshi Nakao (Yomiuri Giants); Juzo Sanada (Taiyo Robins)	Takeshi Doigaki (Osaka Tigers)	Tetsuharu Kawakami† (Yomiuri Giants)	Shigeru Chiba * (Yomiuri Giants)	Fumio Fujimura (Osaka Tigers)	Chusuke Kizuka (Nankai Hawks)	Noboru Aota (Yomiuri Giants)	Kaoru Betto† (Osaka Tigers)	Michinori Tsubouchi (Kinsei Stars)	
1949	Hideo Fujimoto (Yomiuri Giants)	Takeshi Doigaki (Osaka Tigers)	Tetsuharu Kawakami† (Yomiuri Giants)	Shigeru Chiba * (Yomiuri Giants)	Fumio Fujimura (Osaka Tigers)	Chusuke Kizuka (Nankai Hawks)	Makoto Kozuru (Daiei Stars)	Hiroshi Oshita (Tokyu Flyers)	Kaoru Betto† (Osaka Tigers)	

=== Nippon Professional Baseball (1950–present) ===
==== Central League ====
Year	P	C	1B	2B	3B	SS	OF	OF	OF	Ref
1950	Juzo Sanada (Shochiku Robins)	Shoji Arakawa (Shochiku Robins)	Michio Nishizawa (Chunichi Dragons)	Shigeru Chiba * (Yomiuri Giants)	Fumio Fujimura (Osaka Tigers)	Katsumi Shiraishi (Hiroshima Carp)	Noboru Aota (Yomiuri Giants)	Yoshiyuki Iwamoto (Shochiku Robins)	Makoto Kozuru (Shochiku Robins)	
1951	Takehiko Bessho† (Yomiuri Giants)	Akira Noguchi (Nagoya Dragons)	Tetsuharu Kawakami† (Yomiuri Giants)	Shigeru Chiba * (Yomiuri Giants)	Fumio Fujimura (Osaka Tigers)	Saburo Hirai (Yomiuri Giants)	Noboru Aota (Yomiuri Giants)	Yoshiyuki Iwamoto (Shochiku Robins)	Masayasu Kaneda (Osaka Tigers)	
1952	Takehiko Bessho† (Yomiuri Giants)	Akira Noguchi (Nagoya Dragons)	Michio Nishizawa (Nagoya Dragons)	Shigeru Chiba * (Yomiuri Giants)	Fumio Fujimura (Osaka Tigers)	Saburo Hirai (Yomiuri Giants)	Yuko Minamimura (Yomiuri Giants)	Satoru Sugiyama (Nagoya Dragons)	Wally Yonamine† (Yomiuri Giants)	
1953	Takumi Otomo (Yomiuri Giants)	Jun Hirota (Yomiuri Giants)	Tetsuharu Kawakami† (Yomiuri Giants)	Shigeru Chiba * (Yomiuri Giants)	Alan Yogi (Osaka Tigers)	Saburo Hirai (Yomiuri Giants)	Masayasu Kaneda; Osaka Tigers	Yuko Minamimura (Yomiuri Giants)	Wally Yonamine† (Yomiuri Giants)	
1954	Shigeru Sugishita (Chunichi Dragons)	Jun Hirota (Yomiuri Giants)	Michio Nishizawa (Chunichi Dragons	Jun Hakota (Kokutetsu Swallows)	Mitsuo Uno (Kokutetsu Swallows)	Tatsuro Hirooka (Yomiuri Giants)	Satoru Sugiyama (Chunichi Dragons)	Hiroyuki Watanabe (Osaka Tigers)	Wally Yonamine† (Yomiuri Giants)	
1955	Takehiko Bessho† (Yomiuri Giants)	Jun Hirota (Yomiuri Giants)	Tetsuharu Kawakami† (Yomiuri Giants)	Noboru Inoue (Chunichi Dragons)	Riichi Kodama (Chunichi Dragons)	Yoshio Yoshida† (Osaka Tigers)	Yukihiko Machida (Kokutetsu Swallows)	Hiroyuki Watanabe (Osaka Tigers)	Wally Yonamine† (Yomiuri Giants)	
1956	Takehiko Bessho† (Yomiuri Giants)	Shigeru Fujio (Yomiuri Giants)	Tetsuharu Kawakami† (Yomiuri Giants)	Noboru Inoue (Chunichi Dragons)	Riichi Kodama (Chunichi Dragons)	Yoshio Yoshida† (Osaka Tigers)	Noboru Aota (Taiyo Whales)	Kenjiro Tamiya (Osaka Tigers)	Wally Yonamine† (Yomiuri Giants)	
1957	Masaichi Kaneda (Kokutetsu Swallows)	Shigeru Fujio (Yomiuri Giants)	Tetsuharu Kawakami† (Yomiuri Giants)	Noboru Inoue (Chunichi Dragons)	Hideshi Miyake (Osaka Tigers)	Yoshio Yoshida† (Osaka Tigers)	Noboru Aota (Taiyo Whales)	Kenjiro Tamiya (Osaka Tigers)	Wally Yonamine† (Yomiuri Giants)	
1958	Masaichi Kaneda (Kokutetsu Swallows)	Shigeru Fujio (Yomiuri Giants)	Tetsuharu Kawakami† (Yomiuri Giants)	Noboru Inoue (Chunichi Dragons)	Shigeo Nagashima† (Yomiuri Giants)	Yoshio Yoshida† (Osaka Tigers)	Toru Mori (Chunichi Dragons)	Kenjiro Tamiya (Osaka Tigers)	Wally Yonamine† (Yomiuri Giants)	
1959	Motoshi Fujita (Yomiuri Giants)	Shigeru Fujio (Yomiuri Giants)	Katsumi Fujimoto (Osaka Tigers)	Masataka Tsuchiya (Yomiuri Giants)	Shigeo Nagashima† (Yomiuri Giants)	Yoshio Yoshida† (Osaka Tigers)	Toru Mori (Chunichi Dragons)	Akira Owada (Hiroshima Toyo Carp)	Kazuhiko Sakazaki (Yomiuri Giants)	
1960	Noboru Akiyama (Taiyo Whales)	Kiyoshi Doi (Taiyo Whales)	Kazuhiko Kondo (Taiyo Whales)	Noboru Inoue (Chunichi Dragons)	Shigeo Nagashima† (Yomiuri Giants)	Yoshio Yoshida† (Osaka Tigers)	Toru Mori (Chunichi Dragons)	Toshio Naka (Chunichi Dragons)	Teruo Namiki (Osaka Tigers)	
1961	Hiroshi Gondo (Chunichi Dragons)	Masaaki Mori† (Yomiuri Giants)	Katsumi Fujimoto (Hanshin Tigers)	Masataka Tsuchiya (Kokutetsu Swallows)	Shigeo Nagashima† (Yomiuri Giants)	Akiteru Kono (Chunichi Dragons)	Shinichi Eto (Chunichi Dragons)	Kazuhiko Kondo (Taiyo Whales)	Katsuya Morinaga (Hiroshima Carp)	
1962	Minoru Murayama (Hanshin Tigers)	Masaaki Mori† (Yomiuri Giants)	Sadaharu Oh† (Yomiuri Giants)	Yoshitaka Kosaka (Hiroshima Carp)	Shigeo Nagashima† (Yomiuri Giants)	Yoshio Yoshida† (Hanshin Tigers)	Kazuhiko Kondo (Taiyo Whales)	Katsuya Morinaga (Hiroshima Carp)	Teruo Namiki (Hanshin Tigers)	
1963	Masaichi Kaneda (Kokutetsu Swallows)	Masaaki Mori† (Yomiuri Giants)	Sadaharu Oh† (Yomiuri Giants)	Morimichi Takagi * (Chunichi Dragons)	Shigeo Nagashima† (Yomiuri Giants)	Takeshi Koba (Hiroshima Carp)	Shinichi Eto (Chunichi Dragons)	Eiji Fujii (Hanshin Tigers)	Kazuhiko Kondo (Taiyo Whales)	
1964	Gene Bacque (Hanshin Tigers)	Masaaki Mori† (Yomiuri Giants)	Sadaharu Oh† (Yomiuri Giants)	Morimichi Takagi * (Chunichi Dragons)	Shigeo Nagashima† (Yomiuri Giants)	Yoshio Yoshida† (Hanshin Tigers)	Shinichi Eto (Chunichi Dragons)	Kazuhiko Kondo (Taiyo Whales)	Shozo Shigematsu (Taiyo Whales)	
1965	Minoru Murayama (Hanshin Tigers)	Masaaki Mori† (Yomiuri Giants)	Sadaharu Oh† (Yomiuri Giants)	Morimichi Takagi * (Chunichi Dragons)	Shigeo Nagashima† (Yomiuri Giants)	Yoshio Yoshida† (Hanshin Tigers)	Shinichi Eto (Chunichi Dragons)	Kazuhiko Kondo (Taiyo Whales)	Toshio Naka (Chunichi Dragons)	
1966	Minoru Murayama (Hanshin Tigers)	Masaaki Mori† (Yomiuri Giants)	Sadaharu Oh† (Yomiuri Giants)	Morimichi Takagi * (Chunichi Dragons)	Shigeo Nagashima† (Yomiuri Giants)	Shuhei Ichieda (Chunichi Dragons)	Shinichi Eto (Chunichi Dragons)	Toshio Naka (Chunichi Dragons)	Kazuyoshi Yamamoto (Hiroshima Carp)	
1967	Kentaro Ogawa (Chunichi Dragons)	Masaaki Mori† (Yomiuri Giants)	Sadaharu Oh† (Yomiuri Giants)	Morimichi Takagi * (Chunichi Dragons)	Shigeo Nagashima† (Yomiuri Giants)	Taira Fujita (Hanshin Tigers)	Kazuhiko Kondo (Taiyo Whales)	Toshio Naka (Chunichi Dragons)	Isao Shibata (Yomiuri Giants)	
1968	Yutaka Enatsu (Hanshin Tigers)	Masaaki Mori† (Yomiuri Giants)	Sadaharu Oh† (Yomiuri Giants)	Shozo Doi (Yomiuri Giants)	Shigeo Nagashima† (Yomiuri Giants)	Yukinobu Kuroe (Yomiuri Giants)	Shinichi Eto (Chunichi Dragons)	Dave Roberts (Sankei Atoms)	Kazuhiro Yamauchi (Hiroshima Toyo Carp)	
1969	Kazumi Takahashi (Yomiuri Giants)	Tatsuhiko Kimata (Chunichi Dragons)	Sadaharu Oh† (Yomiuri Giants)	Shozo Doi (Yomiuri Giants)	Shigeo Nagashima† (Yomiuri Giants)	Taira Fujita (Hanshin Tigers)	Dave Roberts (Sankei Atoms)	Shigeru Takada (Yomiuri Giants)	Kazuyoshi Yamamoto (Hiroshima Toyo Carp)	
1970	Masaji Hiramatsu (Taiyo Whales)	Tatsuhiko Kimata (Chunichi Dragons)	Sadaharu Oh† (Yomiuri Giants)	Motoo Andoh (Hanshin Tigers)	Shigeo Nagashima† (Yomiuri Giants)	Taira Fujita (Hanshin Tigers)	Akira Ejiri (Taiyo Whales)	Toshio Naka (Chunichi Dragons)	Shigeru Takada (Yomiuri Giants)	
1971	Masaji Hiramatsu (Taiyo Whales)	Tatsuhiko Kimata (Chunichi Dragons)	Sadaharu Oh† (Yomiuri Giants)	Yasuhiro Kunisada (Hiroshima Toyo Carp)	Shigeo Nagashima† (Yomiuri Giants)	Taira Fujita (Hanshin Tigers)	Jitsuo Mizutani (Hiroshima Toyo Carp)	Isao Shibata (Yomiuri Giants)	Shigeru Takada (Yomiuri Giants)	
1972	Tsuneo Horiuchi (Yomiuri Giants)	Koichi Tabuchi (Hanshin Tigers)	Sadaharu Oh† (Yomiuri Giants)	John Sipin (Taiyo Whales)	Shigeo Nagashima† (Yomiuri Giants)	Toshiyuki Mimura (Hiroshima Toyo Carp)	Isao Shibata (Yomiuri Giants)	Shigeru Takada (Yomiuri Giants)	Tsutomu Wakamatsu (Yakult Atoms)	
1973	Kazumi Takahashi (Yomiuri Giants)	Koichi Tabuchi (Hanshin Tigers)	Sadaharu Oh† (Yomiuri Giants)	John Sipin (Taiyo Whales)	Shigeo Nagashima† (Yomiuri Giants)	Taira Fujita (Hanshin Tigers)	Akira Ejiri (Taiyo Whales)	Isao Shibata (Yomiuri Giants)	Tsutomu Wakamatsu (Yakult Atoms)	
1974	Tsuneo Horiuchi (Yomiuri Giants)	Koichi Tabuchi (Hanshin Tigers)	Sadaharu Oh† (Yomiuri Giants)	Morimichi Takagi * (Chunichi Dragons)	Shigeo Nagashima† (Yomiuri Giants)	Taira Fujita (Hanshin Tigers)	Gene Martin (Chunichi Dragons)	Toshimitsu Suetsugu (Yomiuri Giants)	Tsutomu Wakamatsu (Yakult Swallows)	
1975	Yoshiro Sotokoba (Hiroshima Toyo Carp)	Koichi Tabuchi (Hanshin Tigers)	Sadaharu Oh† (Yomiuri Giants)	Tsuyoshi Oshita (Hiroshima Toyo Carp)	Sachio Kinugasa (Hiroshima Toyo Carp)	Toshiyuki Mimura (Hiroshima Toyo Carp)	Hiroaki Inoue (Chunichi Dragons)	Roger Repoz (Yakult Swallows)	Koji Yamamoto (Hiroshima Toyo Carp)	
1976	Kojiro Ikegaya (Hiroshima Toyo Carp)	Koichi Tabuchi (Hanshin Tigers)	Sadaharu Oh† (Yomiuri Giants)	Davey Johnson (Yomiuri Giants)	Masayuki Kakefu (Hanshin Tigers)	Toshiyuki Mimura (Hiroshima Toyo Carp)	Isao Harimoto† (Yomiuri Giants)	Tsutomu Wakamatsu (Yakult Swallows)	Kenichi Yazawa (Chunichi Dragons)	
1977	Shigeru Kobayashi (Yomiuri Giants)	Tatsuhiko Kimata (Chunichi Dragons)	Sadaharu Oh† (Yomiuri Giants)	Morimichi Takagi * (Chunichi Dragons)	Masayuki Kakefu (Hanshin Tigers)	Kazumasa Kono (Yomiuri Giants)	Isao Harimoto† (Yomiuri Giants)	Tsutomu Wakamatsu (Yakult Swallows)	Koji Yamamoto (Hiroshima Toyo Carp)	
1978	Hisao Niura (Yomiuri Giants)	Akihiko Ohya (Yakult Swallows)	Sadaharu Oh† (Yomiuri Giants)	Dave Hilton (Yakult Swallows)	Masayuki Kakefu (Hanshin Tigers)	Yoshihiko Takahashi (Hiroshima Toyo Carp)	Charlie Manuel (Yakult Swallows)	Tsutomu Wakamatsu (Yakult Swallows)	Koji Yamamoto (Hiroshima Toyo Carp)	
1979	Shigeru Kobayashi (Hanshin Tigers)	Tatsuhiko Kimata (Chunichi Dragons)	Sadaharu Oh† (Yomiuri Giants)	Felix Millan (Yokohama Taiyo Whales)	Masayuki Kakefu (Hanshin Tigers)	Yoshihiko Takahashi (Hiroshima Toyo Carp)	Mike Reinbach (Hanshin Tigers)	Tsutomu Wakamatsu (Yakult Swallows)	Koji Yamamoto (Hiroshima Toyo Carp)	
1980	Suguru Egawa (Yomiuri Giants)	Akihiko Ohya (Yakult Swallows)	Kenichi Yazawa (Chunichi Dragons)	Mitsuo Motoi (Yokohama Taiyo Whales)	Sachio Kinugasa (Hiroshima Toyo Carp)	Yoshihiko Takahashi (Hiroshima Toyo Carp)	Toru Sugiura (Yakult Swallows)	Tsutomu Wakamatsu (Yakult Swallows)	Koji Yamamoto (Hiroshima Toyo Carp)	
1981	Suguru Egawa (Yomiuri Giants)	Kazuhiro Yamakura (Yomiuri Giants)	Taira Fujita (Hanshin Tigers)	Kazunori Shinozuka (Yomiuri Giants)	Masayuki Kakefu (Hanshin Tigers)	Daisuke Yamashita (Yokohama Taiyo Whales)	Jim Lyttle (Hiroshima Toyo Carp)	Yasushi Tao (Chunichi Dragons)	Koji Yamamoto (Hiroshima Toyo Carp)	
1982	Manabu Kitabeppu (Hiroshima Toyo Carp)	Takayoshi Nakao (Chunichi Dragons)	Kenichi Yazawa (Chunichi Dragons)	Kazunori Shinozuka; Yomiuri Giants)	Masayuki Kakefu (Hanshin Tigers)	Masaru Uno (Chunichi Dragons)	Keiji Nagasaki (Yokohama Taiyo Whales)	Yasushi Tao (Chunichi Dragons)	Koji Yamamoto (Hiroshima Toyo Carp)	
1983	Kazuhiko Endo (Yokohama Taiyo Whales)	Kazuhiro Yamakura (Yomiuri Giants)	Kenichi Yazawa (Chunichi Dragons)	Akinobu Mayumi (Hanshin Tigers)	Tatsunori Hara (Yomiuri Giants)	Yoshihiko Takahashi (Hiroshima Toyo Carp)	Tadashi Matsumoto (Yomiuri Giants)	Yasushi Tao (Chunichi Dragons)	Koji Yamamoto (Hiroshima Toyo Carp)	
1984	Kazuo Yamane (Hiroshima Toyo Carp)	Mitsuo Tatsukawa (Hiroshima Toyo Carp)	Kenichi Yazawa (Chunichi Dragons)	Kazunori Shinozuka (Yomiuri Giants)	Sachio Kinugasa (Hiroshima Toyo Carp)	Masaru Uno (Chunichi Dragons)	Tsutomu Wakamatsu (Yakult Swallows)	Koji Yamamoto (Hiroshima Toyo Carp)	Ryuzo Yamasaki (Hiroshima Toyo Carp)	
1985	Tatsuo Komatsu (Chunichi Dragons)	Yukio Yaegashi (Yakult Swallows)	Randy Bass (Hanshin Tigers)	Akinobu Okada (Hanshin Tigers)	Masayuki Kakefu (Hanshin Tigers)	Yutaka Takagi (Yokohama Taiyo Whales)	Akinobu Mayumi (Hanshin Tigers)	Toru Sugiura (Yakult Swallows)	Ryuzo Yamasaki (Hiroshima Toyo Carp)	
1986	Manabu Kitabeppu (Hiroshima Toyo Carp)	Mitsuo Tatsukawa (Hiroshima Toyo Carp)	Randy Bass (Hanshin Tigers)	Kazunori Shinozuka (Yomiuri Giants)	Leon Lee (Yakult Swallows)	Yoshihiko Takahashi (Hiroshima Toyo Carp)	Warren Cromartie (Yomiuri Giants)	Koji Yamamoto (Hiroshima Toyo Carp)	Sadaaki Yoshimura (Yomiuri Giants)	
1987	Masumi Kuwata (Yomiuri Giants)	Kazuhiro Yamakura (Yomiuri Giants)	Randy Bass (Hanshin Tigers)	Kazunori Shinozuka (Yomiuri Giants)	Tatsunori Hara (Yomiuri Giants)	Masaru Uno (Chunichi Dragons)	Warren Cromartie (Yomiuri Giants)	Carlos Ponce (Yokohama Taiyo Whales)	Sadaaki Yoshimura (Yomiuri Giants)	
1988	Kazuyuki Ono (Chunichi Dragons)	Mitsuo Tatsukawa (Hiroshima Toyo Carp)	Hiromitsu Ochiai (Chunichi Dragons)	Kozo Shoda (Hiroshima Toyo Carp)	Tatsunori Hara (Yomiuri Giants)	Takahiro Ikeyama (Yakult Swallows)	Katsumi Hirosawa (Yakult Swallows)	Jim Paciorek (Yokohama Taiyo Whales)	Carlos Ponce (Yokohama Taiyo Whales)	
1989	Masaki Saito (Yomiuri Giants)	Takayoshi Nakao (Yomiuri Giants)	Larry Parrish (Yakult Swallows)	Kozo Shoda (Hiroshima Toyo Carp)	Hiromitsu Ochiai (Chunichi Dragons)	Takahiro Ikeyama (Yakult Swallows)	Warren Cromartie (Yomiuri Giants)	Toshikatsu Hikono (Chunichi Dragons)	Kenichi Yamazaki (Yokohama Taiyo Whales)	
1990	Masaki Saito (Yomiuri Giants)	Shinichi Murata (Yomiuri Giants)	Hiromitsu Ochiai (Chunichi Dragons)	Yutaka Takagi (Yokohama Taiyo Whales)	Vance Law (Chunichi Dragons)	Takahiro Ikeyama (Yakult Swallows)	Tatsunori Hara (Yomiuri Giants)	Katsumi Hirosawa (Yakult Swallows)	Carlos Ponce (Yokohama Taiyo Whales)	
1991	Shinji Sasaoka (Hiroshima Toyo Carp)	Atsuya Furuta (Yakult Swallows)	Hiromitsu Ochiai (Chunichi Dragons)	Yutaka Takagi (Yokohama Taiyo Whales)	Ryuzo Yamasaki (Hiroshima Toyo Carp)	Kenjiro Nomura (Hiroshima Toyo Carp	Tatsunori Hara (Yomiuri Giants)	Katsumi Hirosawa (Yakult Swallows)	R. J. Reynolds (Yokohama Taiyo Whales)	
1992	Masaki Saito (Yomiuri Giants)	Atsuya Furuta (Yakult Swallows)	Jim Paciorek (Hanshin Tigers)	Yutaka Wada (Hanshin Tigers)	Jack Howell (Yakult Swallows)	Takahiro Ikeyama (Yakult Swallows)	Tetsuya Iida (Yakult Swallows)	Tomonori Maeda (Hiroshima Toyo Carp)	Larry Sheets (Yokohama Taiyo Whales)	
1993	Shinji Imanaka (Chunichi Dragons)	Atsuya Furuta (Yakult Swallows)	Katsumi Hirosawa (Yakult Swallows)	Bobby Rose (Yokohama BayStars)	Akira Eto (Hiroshima Toyo Carp)	Takahiro Ikeyama (Yakult Swallows)	Tomonori Maeda (Hiroshima Toyo Carp)	Alonzo Powell (Chunichi Dragons)	Tsuyoshi Shinjo (Hanshin Tigers)	
1994	Masahiro Yamamoto (Chunichi Dragons)	Shuji Nishiyama (Hiroshima Toyo Carp)	Yasuaki Taiho (Chunichi Dragons)	Yutaka Wada (Hanshin Tigers)	Akira Eto (Hiroshima Toyo Carp)	Masahiro Kawai (Yomiuri Giants)	Glenn Braggs (Yokohama BayStars)	Tomonori Maeda (Hiroshima Toyo Carp)	Alonzo Powell (Chunichi Dragons)	
1995	Masaki Saito (Yomiuri Giants)	Atsuya Furuta (Yakult Swallows)	Tom O'Malley (Yakult Swallows)	Bobby Rose (Yokohama BayStars)	Akira Eto (Hiroshima Toyo Carp)	Kenjiro Nomura (Hiroshima Toyo Carp)	Tomoaki Kanemoto (Hiroshima Toyo Carp)	Hideki Matsui (Yomiuri Giants)	Alonzo Powell (Chunichi Dragons)	
1996	Masaki Saito (Yomiuri Giants)	Shuji Nishiyama (Hiroshima Toyo Carp)	Luis Lopez (Hiroshima Toyo Carp)	Kazuyoshi Tatsunami (Chunichi Dragons)	Akira Eto (Hiroshima Toyo Carp)	Kenjiro Nomura (Hiroshima Toyo Carp)	Hideki Matsui (Yomiuri Giants)	Alonzo Powell (Chunichi Dragons)	Takeshi Yamasaki (Chunichi Dragons)	
1997	Masahiro Yamamoto (Chunichi Dragons)	Atsuya Furuta (Yakult Swallows)	Luis Lopez ((Hiroshima Toyo Carp)	Bobby Rose (Yokohama BayStars)	Leo Gómez (Chunichi Dragons)	Takuro Ishii (Yokohama BayStars)	Dwayne Hosey (Yakult Swallows)	Hideki Matsui (Yomiuri Giants)	Takanori Suzuki (Yokohama BayStars)	
1998	Kazuhiro Sasaki (Yokohama BayStars)	Motonobu Tanishige (Yokohama BayStars)	Norihiro Komada (Yokohama BayStars)	Bobby Rose (Yokohama BayStars)	Akira Eto (Hiroshima Toyo Carp)	Takuro Ishii (Yokohama BayStars)	Tomonori Maeda (Hiroshima Toyo Carp)	Hideki Matsui (Yomiuri Giants)	Takanori Suzuki (Yokohama BayStars)	
1999	Koji Uehara (Yomiuri Giants)	Atsuya Furuta (Yakult Swallows)	Roberto Petagine (Yakult Swallows)	Bobby Rose (Yokohama BayStars)	Leo Gómez (Chunichi Dragons)	Takuro Ishii (Yokohama BayStars)	Hideki Matsui (Yomiuri Giants)	Koichi Sekikawa (Chunichi Dragons)	Yoshinobu Takahashi (Yomiuri Giants)	
2000	Kimiyasu Kudo (Yomiuri Giants)	Atsuya Furuta (Yakult Swallows)	Roberto Petagine (Yakult Swallows)	Bobby Rose (Yokohama BayStars)	Akira Eto (Yomiuri Giants)	Takuro Ishii (Yokohama BayStars)	Tomoaki Kanemoto (Hiroshima Carp)	Hideki Matsui (Yomiuri Giants)	Tsuyoshi Shinjo (Hanshin Tigers)	
2001	Shugo Fujii (Yakult Swallows)	Atsuya Furuta (Yakult Swallows)	Roberto Petagine (Yakult Swallows)	Eddy Diaz (Hiroshima Carp)	Akira Eto (Yomiuri Giants)	Takuro Ishii (Yokohama BayStars)	Atsunori Inaba (Yakult Swallows)	Tomoaki Kanemoto (Hiroshima Carp)	Hideki Matsui (Yomiuri Giants)	
2002	Koji Uehara (Yomiuri Giants)	Shinnosuke Abe (Yomiuri Giants)	Roberto Petagine (Yakult Swallows)	Makoto Imaoka (Hanshin Tigers)	Akinori Iwamura (Yakult Swallows)	Hirokazu Ibata (Chunichi Dragons)	Kosuke Fukudome (Chunichi Dragons)	Hideki Matsui (Yomiuri Giants)	Takayuki Shimizu (Yomiuri Giants)	
2003	Kei Igawa (Hanshin Tigers)	Akihiro Yano (Hanshin Tigers)	George Arias (Hanshin Tigers)	Makoto Imaoka (Hanshin Tigers)	Ken Suzuki (Yakult Swallows)	Tomohiro Nioka (Yomiuri Giants)	Norihiro Akahoshi (Hanshin Tigers)	Kosuke Fukudome (Chunichi Dragons)	Alex Ramírez (Yakult Swallows)	
2004	Kenshin Kawakami (Chunichi Dragons)	Atsuya Furuta (Yakult Swallows)	Tyrone Woods (Yokohama BayStars)	Masahiro Araki (Chunichi Dragons); Greg LaRocca (Hiroshima Carp)	Kazuyoshi Tatsunami (Chunichi Dragons)	Hirokazu Ibata (Chunichi Dragons)	Tomoaki Kanemoto (Hanshin Tigers)	Tuffy Rhodes (Yomiuri Giants)	Shigenobu Shima (Hiroshima Toyo Carp)	
2005	Hiroki Kuroda (Hiroshima Toyo Carp)	Akihiro Yano (Hanshin Tigers)	Takahiro Arai (Hiroshima Toyo Carp)	Masahiro Araki (Chunichi Dragons)	Hirokazu Ibata (Chunichi Dragons)	Makoto Imaoka (Hanshin Tigers)	Norihiro Akahoshi (Hanshin Tigers)	Norichika Aoki (Yakult Swallows)	Tomoaki Kanemoto (Hanshin Tigers)	
2006	Kenshin Kawakami (Chunichi Dragons)	Akihiro Yano (Hanshin Tigers)	Tyrone Woods (Chunichi Dragons)	Masahiro Araki (Chunichi Dragons)	Akinori Iwamura (Tokyo Yakult Swallows)	Hirokazu Ibata (Chunichi Dragons)	Norichika Aoki (Tokyo Yakult Swallows)	Kosuke Fukudome (Chunichi Dragons)	Tomoaki Kanemoto (Hanshin Tigers)	
2007	Hisanori Takahashi (Yomiuri Giants)	Shinnosuke Abe (Yomiuri Giants)	Tyrone Woods (Chunichi Dragons)	Hiroyasu Tanaka (Tokyo Yakult Swallows)	Michihiro Ogasawara (Yomiuri Giants)	Hirokazu Ibata (Chunichi Dragons)	Norichika Aoki (Tokyo Yakult Swallows)	Alex Ramirez (Tokyo Yakult Swallows)	Yoshinobu Takahashi (Yomiuri Giants)	
2008	Seth Greisinger (Yomiuri Giants)	Shinnosuke Abe (Yomiuri Giants)	Seiichi Uchikawa (Yokohama BayStars)	Akihiro Higashide (Hiroshima Toyo Carp)	Shuichi Murata (Yokohama BayStars)	Takashi Toritani (Hanshin Tigers)	Alex Ramirez (Yomiuri Giants)	Tomoaki Kanemoto (Hanshin Tigers)	Norichika Aoki (Tokyo Yakult Swallows)	
2009	Dicky Gonzalez (Yomiuri Giants)	Shinnosuke Abe (Yomiuri Giants)	Tony Blanco (Chunichi Dragons)	Akihiro Higashide (Hiroshima Toyo Carp)	Michihiro Ogasawara (Yomiuri Giants)	Hayato Sakamoto (Yomiuri Giants)	Alex Ramirez (Yomiuri Giants)	Norichika Aoki (Tokyo Yakult Swallows)	Seiichi Uchikawa (Yokohama BayStars)	
2010	Kenta Maeda (Hiroshima Toyo Carp)	Shinnosuke Abe (Yomiuri Giants)	Craig Brazell (Hanshin Tigers)	Keiichi Hirano (Hanshin Tigers)	Masahiko Morino (Chunichi Dragons)	Takashi Toritani (Hanshin Tigers)	Kazuhiro Wada (Chunichi Dragons)	Norichika Aoki (Tokyo Yakult Swallows)	Matt Murton (Hanshin Tigers)	
2011	Kazuki Yoshimi (Chunichi Dragons)	Shinnosuke Abe (Yomiuri Giants)	Kenta Kurihara (Hiroshima Toyo Carp)	Keiichi Hirano (Hanshin Tigers)	Shinya Miyamoto (Tokyo Yakult Swallows)	Takashi Toritani (Hanshin Tigers)	Hisayoshi Chono (Yomiuri Giants)	Norichika Aoki (Tokyo Yakult Swallows)	Matt Murton (Hanshin Tigers)	
2012	Tetsuya Utsumi (Yomiuri Giants)	Shinnosuke Abe (Yomiuri Giants)	Tony Blanco (Chunichi Dragons)	Hiroyasu Tanaka (Tokyo Yakult Swallows)	Shuichi Murata (Yomiuri Giants)	Hayato Sakamoto (Yomiuri Giants)	Hisayoshi Chono (Yomiuri Giants)	Yohei Oshima (Chunichi Dragons)	Wladimir Balentien (Tokyo Yakult Swallows)	
2013	Kenta Maeda (Hiroshima Toyo Carp)	Shinnosuke Abe (Yomiuri Giants)	Tony Blanco (Yokohama DeNA BayStars)	Tsuyoshi Nishioka (Hanshin Tigers)	Shuichi Murata (Yomiuri Giants)	Takashi Toritani (Hanshin Tigers)	Hisayoshi Chono (Yomiuri Giants)	Matt Murton (Hanshin Tigers)	Wladimir Balentien (Tokyo Yakult Swallows)	
2014	Tomoyuki Sugano (Yomiuri Giants)	Shinnosuke Abe (Yomiuri Giants)	Mauro Gomez (Hanshin Tigers)	Tetsuto Yamada (Tokyo Yakult Swallows)	Hector Luna (Chunichi Dragons)	Takashi Toritani (Hanshin Tigers)	Yoshihiro Maru (Hiroshima Toyo Carp)	Matt Murton (Hanshin Tigers)	Yuhei Takai (Tokyo Yakult Swallows)	
2015	Kenta Maeda (Hiroshima Toyo Carp)	Yuhei Nakamura (Tokyo Yakult Swallows)	Kazuhiro Hatakeyama (Tokyo Yakult Swallows)	Tetsuto Yamada (Tokyo Yakult Swallows)	Shingo Kawabata (Tokyo Yakult Swallows)	Takashi Toritani (Hanshin Tigers)	Yoshitomo Tsutsugo (Yokohama DeNA BayStars)	Kosuke Fukudome (Hanshin Tigers)	Ryosuke Hirata (Chunichi Dragons)	
2016	Yusuke Nomura (Hiroshima Toyo Carp)	Yoshiyuki Ishihara (Hiroshima Toyo Carp)	Takahiro Arai (Hiroshima Toyo Carp)	Tetsuto Yamada (Tokyo Yakult Swallows)	Shuichi Murata (Yomiuri Giants)	Hayato Sakamoto (Yomiuri Giants)	Yoshitomo Tsutsugo (Yokohama DeNA BayStars)	Seiya Suzuki (Hiroshima Toyo Carp)	Yoshihiro Maru (Hiroshima Toyo Carp)	
2017	Tomoyuki Sugano (Yomiuri Giants)	Tsubasa Aizawa (Hiroshima Toyo Carp)	José López (Yokohama DeNA BayStars)	Ryosuke Kikuchi (Hiroshima Toyo Carp)	Toshiro Miyazaki (Yokohama DeNA BayStars)	Kosuke Tanaka (Hiroshima Toyo Carp)	Yoshitomo Tsutsugo (Yokohama DeNA BayStars)	Seiya Suzuki (Hiroshima Toyo Carp)	Yoshihiro Maru (Hiroshima Toyo Carp)	
2018	Tomoyuki Sugano (Yomiuri Giants)	Tsubasa Aizawa (Hiroshima Toyo Carp)	Dayán Viciedo (Chunichi Dragons)	Tetsuto Yamada (Tokyo Yakult Swallows)	Toshiro Miyazaki (Yokohama DeNA BayStars)	Hayato Sakamoto (Yomiuri Giants)	Neftalí Soto (Yokohama DeNA BayStars)	Seiya Suzuki (Hiroshima Toyo Carp)	Yoshihiro Maru (Hiroshima Toyo Carp)	
2019	Shun Yamaguchi (Yomiuri Giants)	Tsubasa Aizawa (Hiroshima Toyo Carp)	Dayán Viciedo (Chunichi Dragons)	Tetsuto Yamada (Tokyo Yakult Swallows)	Shuhei Takahashi (Chunichi Dragons)	Hayato Sakamoto (Yomiuri Giants)	Neftalí Soto (Yokohama DeNA BayStars)	Seiya Suzuki (Hiroshima Toyo Carp)	Yoshihiro Maru (Yomiuri Giants)	
2020	Tomoyuki Sugano (Yomiuri Giants)	Takumi Ohshiro (Yomiuri Giants)	Munetaka Murakami (Tokyo Yakult Swallows)	Ryosuke Kikuchi (Hiroshima Toyo Carp)	Kazuma Okamoto (Yomiuri Giants)	Hayato Sakamoto (Yomiuri Giants)	Keita Sano (Yokohama DeNA BayStars)	Seiya Suzuki (Hiroshima Toyo Carp)	Yoshihiro Maru (Yomiuri Giants)	
2021	Yuya Yanagi (Chunichi Dragons)	Yuhei Nakamura (Tokyo Yakult Swallows)	Jefry Marté (Chunichi Dragons)	Tetsuto Yamada (Tokyo Yakult Swallows)	Munetaka Murakami (Tokyo Yakult Swallows)	Hayato Sakamoto (Yomiuri Giants)	Koji Chikamoto (Hanshin Tigers)	Seiya Suzuki (Hiroshima Toyo Carp)	Yasutaka Shiomi (Tokyo Yakult Swallows)	
2022	Koyo Aoyagi (Hanshin Tigers)	Yuhei Nakamura (Tokyo Yakult Swallows)	José Osuna (Tokyo Yakult Swallows)	Shugo Maki (Yokohama DeNA BayStars)	Munetaka Murakami (Tokyo Yakult Swallows)	Takumu Nakano (Hanshin Tigers)	Koji Chikamoto (Hanshin Tigers)	Keita Sano (Yokohama DeNA BayStars)	Yūki Okabayashi (Chunichi Dragons)	
2023	Katsuki Azuma (Yokohama DeNA BayStars)	Takumi Ohshiro (Yomiuri Giants)	Yusuke Oyama (Hanshin Tigers)	Shugo Maki (Yokohama DeNA BayStars)	Toshiro Miyazaki (Yokohama DeNA BayStars)	Seiya Kinami (Hanshin Tigers)	Koji Chikamoto (Hanshin Tigers)	Ryoma Nishikawa (Hiroshima Toyo Carp)	Yūki Okabayashi (Chunichi Dragons)	
2024	Tomoyuki Sugano (Yomiuri Giants)	Yudai Yamamoto (Yokohama DeNA BayStars)	Kazuma Okamoto (Yomiuri Giants)	Naoki Yoshikawa (Yomiuri Giants)	Munetaka Murakami (Tokyo Yakult Swallows)	Hideki Nagaoka (Tokyo Yakult Swallows)	Koji Chikamoto (Hanshin Tigers)	Domingo Santana (Tokyo Yakult Swallows)	Seiya Hosokawa (Chunichi Dragons)	
2025	Shoki Murakami (Hanshin Tigers)	Seishiro Sakamoto (Hanshin Tigers)	Yusuke Oyama (Hanshin Tigers)	Takumu Nakano (Hanshin Tigers)	Teruaki Sato (Hanshin Tigers)	Yuta Izuguchi (Yomiuri Giants)	Yūki Okabayashi (Chunichi Dragons)	Koji Chikamoto (Hanshin Tigers)	Shota Morishita (Hanshin Tigers)	

==== Pacific League ====
Year	P	C	1B	2B	3B	SS	OF	OF	OF	DH	Ref
1950	Atsushi Aramaki (Mainichi Orions)	Takeshi Doigaki (Mainichi Orions)	Tokuji Iida (Nankai Hawks)	Yasuya Hondo (Mainichi Orions)	Junji Nakatani (Hankyu Braves)	Chusuke Kizuka (Nankai Hawks)	Kaoru Betto† (Mainichi Orions)	Shigeya Iijima (Daiei Stars)	Hiroshi Oshita (Tokyu Flyers)	N/A	
1951	Haruyasu Eto (Nankai Hawks)	Takeshi Doigaki (Mainichi Orions)	Tokuji Iida (Nankai Hawks)	Kazuto Tsuruoka (Nankai Hawks)	Kazuo Kageyama (Nankai Hawks)	Chusuke Kizuka (Nankai Hawks)	Kaoru Betto† (Mainichi Orions)	Shigeya Iijima (Daiei Stars)	Hiroshi Oshita (Tokyu Flyers)	N/A	
1952	Susumu Yuki (Nankai Hawks)	Takeshi Doigaki (Mainichi Orions)	Tokuji Iida (Nankai Hawks)	Isami Okamoto (Nankai Hawks)	Kazuo Kageyama (Nankai Hawks)	Chusuke Kizuka (Nankai Hawks)	Kaoru Betto† (Mainichi Orions)	Shigeya Iijima (Daiei Stars)	Hiroshi Oshita (Nishitetsu Lions)	N/A	
1953	Tokuji Kawasaki (Nishitetsu Lions)	Atsushi Matsui (Nankai Hawks)	Tokuji Iida (Nankai Hawks)	Isami Okamoto (Nankai Hawks)	Futoshi Nakanishi (Nishitetsu Lions)	Chusuke Kizuka (Nankai Hawks)	Kaoru Betto† (Mainichi Orions)	Kazuo Horii (Nankai Hawks)	Hiroshi Oshita (Nishitetsu Lions)	N/A	
1954	Sadao Nishimura (Nishitetsu Lions)	Charlie Luis (Mainichi Orions)	Kozo Kawai (Hankyu Braves)	Nobushige Morishita (Nankai Hawks)	Futoshi Nakanishi (Nishitetsu Lions)	Larry Raines (Hankyu Braves)	Hiroshi Oshita (Nishitetsu Lions)	Seiji Sekiguchi (Nishitetsu Lions)	Kazuhiro Yamauchi (Mainichi Orions)	N/A	
1955	Taisei Nakamura (Nankai Hawks)	Charlie Luis (Mainichi Orions)	Kohei Sugiyama (Nankai Hawks)	Isami Okamoto (Nankai Hawks)	Futoshi Nakanishi (Nishitetsu Lions)	Chusuke Kizuka (Nankai Hawks)	Tokuji Iida (Nankai Hawks)	Katsuki Tokura (Hankyu Braves)	Kazuhiro Yamauchi (Mainichi Orions)	N/A	
1956	Takao Kajimoto (Hankyu Braves)	Katsuya Nomura† (Nankai Hawks)	Kihachi Enomoto (Mainichi Orions)	Shinya Sasaki (Takahashi Unions)	Futoshi Nakanishi (Nishitetsu Lions)	Yasumitsu Toyoda (Nishitetsu Lions)	Kohei Sugiyama (Nankai Hawks)	Katsuki Tokura (Hankyu Braves)	Kazuhiro Yamauchi (Mainichi Orions)	N/A	
1957	Kazuhisa Inao (Nishitetsu Lions)	Katsuya Nomura† (Nankai Hawks)	Kenichiro Okamoto (Hankyu Braves)	Isami Okamoto (Nankai Hawks)	Futoshi Nakanishi (Nishitetsu Lions)	Yasumitsu Toyoda (Nishitetsu Lions)	Shoichi Busujima (Toei Flyers)	Hiroshi Oshita (Nishitetsu Lions)	Kazuhiro Yamauchi (Mainichi Orions)	N/A	
1958	Kazuhisa Inao (Nishitetsu Lions)	Katsuya Nomura† (Nankai Hawks)	Stanley Hashimoto (Toei Flyers)	Chico Barbon (Hankyu Braves)	Futoshi Nakanishi (Nishitetsu Lions)	Takao Katsuragi (Daimai Orions)	Shoichi Busujima (Toei Flyers)	Seiji Sekiguchi (Nishitetsu Lions)	Kohei Sugiyama (Nankai Hawks)	N/A	
1959	Tadashi Sugiura (Nankai Hawks)	Katsuya Nomura† (Nankai Hawks)	Kihachi Enomoto (Daimai Orions)	Isami Okamoto (Nankai Hawks)	Takao Katsuragi (Daimai Orions)	Yasumitsu Toyoda (Nishitetsu Lions)	Seiji Sekiguchi (Nishitetsu Lions)	Kohei Sugiyama (Nankai Hawks)	Teruyuki Takakura (Nishitetsu Lions)	N/A	
1960	Shoichi Ono (Daimai Orions)	Katsuya Nomura† (Nankai Hawks)	Kihachi Enomoto (Daimai Orions)	Akira Ogi (Nishitetsu Lions)	Akitoshi Kodama (Kintetsu Buffaloes)	Yasumitsu Toyoda (Nishitetsu Lions)	Isao Harimoto† (Toei Flyers)	Kenjiro Tamiya (Daimai Orions)	Kazuhiro Yamauchi (Daimai Orions)	N/A	
1961	Kazuhisa Inao (Nishitetsu Lions)	Katsuya Nomura† (Nankai Hawks)	Kihachi Enomoto (Daimai Orions)	Nobushige Morishita (Nankai Hawks)	Futoshi Nakanishi (Nishitetsu Lions)	Yasumitsu Toyoda (Nishitetsu Lions)	Isao Harimoto† (Toei Flyers)	Kenjiro Tamiya (Daimai Orions)	Kazuhiro Yamauchi (Daimai Orions)	N/A	
1962	Kazuhisa Inao (Nishitetsu Lions)	Katsuya Nomura† (Nankai Hawks)	Kihachi Enomoto (Daimai Orions)	Jack Bloomfield (Kintetsu Buffaloes)	Akitoshi Kodama (Kintetsu Buffaloes)	Yasumitsu Toyoda (Nishitetsu Lions)	Isao Harimoto† (Toei Flyers)	Kazuhiro Yamauchi (Daimai Orions)	Katsutoyo Yoshida (Toei Flyers)	N/A	
1963	Kazuhisa Inao (Nishitetsu Lions)	Katsuya Nomura† (Nankai Hawks)	Kihachi Enomoto (Daimai Orions)	Jack Bloomfield (Kintetsu Buffaloes)	Akitoshi Kodama (Kintetsu Buffaloes)	Kenji Koike (Nankai Hawks)	Isao Harimoto† (Toei Flyers)	Yoshinori Hirose (Nankai Hawks)	Kazuhiro Yamauchi (Daimai Orions)	N/A	
1964	Joe Stanka (Nankai Hawks)	Katsuya Nomura† (Nankai Hawks)	Kihachi Enomoto (Tokyo Orions)	Daryl Spencer (Hankyu Braves)	Akitoshi Kodama (Kintetsu Buffaloes)	Kenji Koike (Nankai Hawks)	Isao Harimoto† (Toei Flyers)	Yoshinori Hirose (Nankai Hawks)	Teruyuki Takakura (Nishitetsu Lions)	N/A	
1965	Yukio Ozaki (Toei Flyers)	Katsuya Nomura† (Nankai Hawks)	Takashi Takagi (Kintetsu Buffaloes)	Daryl Spencer (Hankyu Braves)	Akitoshi Kodama (Kintetsu Buffaloes)	Kenji Koike (Nankai Hawks)	Isao Harimoto† (Toei Flyers)	Yoshinori Hirose (Nankai Hawks)	Motoaki Horigome (Nankai Hawks)	N/A	
1966	Tsutomu Tanaka (Nishitetsu Lions)	Katsuya Nomura† (Nankai Hawks)	Kihachi Enomoto (Tokyo Orions)	Yasuhiro Kunisada (Nankai Hawks)	Tony Roig (Nishitetsu Lions)	Kenji Koike (Nankai Hawks)	Shoichi Busujima (Toei Flyers)	Isao Harimoto† (Toei Flyers)	Teruyuki Takakura (Nishitetsu Lions)	N/A	
1967	Mitsuhiro Adachi (Hankyu Braves)	Katsuya Nomura† (Nankai Hawks)	Katsuo Osugi (Toei Flyers)	Don Blasingame (Nankai Hawks)	Kiyoshi Morimoto (Hankyu Braves)	Tsuyoshi Oshita (Toei Flyers)	Masahiro Doi (Kintetsu Buffaloes)	Isao Harimoto† (Toei Flyers)	Tokuji Nagaike (Hankyu Braves)	N/A	
1968	Mutsuo Minagawa (Nankai Hawks)	Katsuya Nomura† (Nankai Hawks)	Kihachi Enomoto (Tokyo Orions)	Don Blasingame (Nankai Hawks)	Yasuhiro Kunisada (Nankai Hawks)	Toshizo Sakamoto (Hankyu Braves)	George Altman (Tokyo Orions)	Masahiro Doi (Kintetsu Buffaloes)	Isao Harimoto† (Toei Flyers)	N/A	
1969	Keishi Suzuki (Kintetsu Buffaloes)	Koji Okamura (Hankyu Braves)	Katsuo Osugi (Toei Flyers)	Hiroyuki Yamazaki (Lotte Orions)	Michiyo Arito (Lotte Orions)	Toshizo Sakamoto (Hankyu Braves)	Isao Harimoto† (Toei Flyers)	Youzou Nagafuchi (Kintetsu Buffaloes)	Tokuji Nagaike (Hankyu Braves)	N/A	
1970	Masaaki Kitaru (Lotte Orions)	Katsuya Nomura† (Nankai Hawks)	Katsuo Osugi (Toei Flyers)	Hiroyuki Yamazaki (Lotte Orions}	Michiyo Arito (Lotte Orions)	Toshizo Sakamoto (Hankyu Braves)	George Altman (Lotte Orions)	Isao Harimoto† (Toei Flyers)	Tokuji Nagaike (Hankyu Braves)	N/A	
1971	Hisashi Yamada (Hankyu Braves)	Katsuya Nomura† (Nankai Hawks)	Katsuo Osugi (Toei Flyers)	Hiroyuki Yamazaki (Lotte Orions)	Michiyo Arito (Lotte Orions)	Toshizo Sakamoto (Hankyu Braves)	George Altman (Lotte Orions)	Hiromitsu Kadota† (Nankai Hawks)	Tokuji Nagaike (Hankyu Braves)	N/A	
1972	Hisashi Yamada (Hankyu Braves)	Katsuya Nomura† (Nankai Hawks)	Katsuo Osugi (Toei Flyers)	Mitsuo Motoi (Nishitetsu Lions)	Michiyo Arito (Lotte Orions)	Yutaka Ohashi (Hankyu Braves)	Yutaka Fukumoto (Hankyu Braves)	Isao Harimoto† (Toei Flyers)	Tokuji Nagaike (Hankyu Braves)	N/A	
1973	Fumio Narita (Lotte Orions)	Katsuya Nomura† (Nankai Hawks)	Hideji Kat (Hankyu Braves)	Teruhide Sakurai (Nankai Hawks)	Michiyo Arito (Lotte Orions)	Yutaka Ohashi (Hankyu Braves)	Yutaka Fukumoto (Hankyu Braves)	Isao Harimoto† (Nittaku Home Flyers)	Tokuji Nagaike (Hankyu Braves)	N/A	
1974	Tomehiro Kaneda (Lotte Orions)	Kimiyasu Murakami (Lotte Orions)	Clarence Jones (Kintetsu Buffaloes)	Hiroyuki Yamazaki (Lotte Orions)	Michiyo Arito (Lotte Orions)	Yutaka Ohashi (Hankyu Braves)	Don Buford (Taiheiyo Club Lions)	Yutaka Fukumoto (Hankyu Braves)	Isao Harimoto† (Nippon Ham Fighters)	N/A	
1975	Keishi Suzuki (Kintetsu Buffaloes)	Katsuya Nomura† (Nankai Hawks)	Hideji Kato (Hankyu Braves)	Bobby Marcano (Hankyu Braves)	Michiyo Arito (Lotte Orions)	Yutaka Ohashi (Hankyu Braves)	Jinten Haku (Taiheiyo Club Lions)	Sumio Hirota (Lotte Orions)	Kyosuke Sasaki (Kintetsu Buffaloes)	Tokuji Nagaike (Hankyu Braves)	
1976	Hisashi Yamada (Hankyu Braves)	Katsuya Nomura† (Nankai Hawks)	Hideji Kato (Hankyu Braves)	Satoru Yoshioka (Taiheiyo Club Lions)	Mitsuru Fujiwara (Nankai Hawks)	Yutaka Ohashi (Hankyu Braves)	Yutaka Fukumoto (Hankyu Braves)	Sumio Hirota (Lotte Orions)	Hiromitsu Kadota† (Nankai Hawks)	Takuji Ota (Taiheiyo Club Lions)	
1977	Hisashi Yamada (Hankyu Braves)	Toshio Kato (Nippon Ham Fighters)	Hideji Kato (Hankyu Braves)	Bobby Marcano (Hankyu Braves)	Michiyo Arito (Lotte Orions)	Shigeru Ishiwata (Kintetsu Buffaloes)	Yutaka Fukumoto (Hankyu Braves)	Hiromitsu Kadota† (Nankai Hawks)	Leron Lee (Lotte Orions)	Yasuhiro Takai (Hankyu Braves)	
1978	Keishi Suzuki (Kintetsu Buffaloes)	Shinji Nakazawa (Hankyu Braves)	Junichi Kashiwabara (Nippon Ham Fighters)	Bobby Marcano (Hankyu Braves)	Kinji Shimatani (Hankyu Braves)	Akinobu Mayumi (Crown Lighter Lions)	Yutaka Fukumoto (Hankyu Braves)	Koji Minoda (Hankyu Braves)	Kyosuke Sasaki (Kintetsu Buffaloes)	Masahiro Doi (Crown Lighter Lions)	
1979	Hisashi Yamada (Hankyu Braves)	Masataka Nashida (Kintetsu Buffaloes)	Hideji Kato (Hankyu Braves)	Bobby Marcano (Hankyu Braves)	Kinji Shimatani (Hankyu Braves)	Shigeru Ishiwata (Kintetsu Buffaloes)	Hiromasa Arai (Nankai Hawks)	Yutaka Fukumoto (Hankyu Braves)	Shigeru Kurihashi (Kintetsu Buffaloes)	Charlie Manuel (Kintetsu Buffaloes)	
1980	Isamu Kida (Nippon Ham Fighters)	Masataka Nashida (Kintetsu Buffaloes)	Leon Lee (Lotte Orions)	Hiroyuki Yamazaki (Seibu Lions)	Michiyo Arito (Lotte Orions)	Nobuhiro Takashiro (Nippon Ham Fighters)	Yutaka Fukumoto (Hankyu Braves)	Shigeru Kurihashi (Kintetsu Buffaloes)	Leron Lee (Lotte Orions)	Charlie Manuel (Kintetsu Buffaloes)	
1981	Choji Murata (Lotte Orions)	Masataka Nashida (Kintetsu Buffaloes)	Junichi Kashiwabara (Nippon Ham Fighters)	Hiromitsu Ochiai (Lotte Orions)	Michiyo Arito (Lotte Orions)	Hiromichi Ishige (Seibu Lions)	Yutaka Fukumoto (Hankyu Braves)	Makoto Shimada (Nippon Ham Fighters)	Terry Whitfield (Seibu Lions)	Hiromitsu Kadota† (Nankai Hawks)	
1982	Mikio Kudo (Nippon Ham Fighters	Shinji Nakazawa (Hankyu Braves)	Junichi Kashiwabara (Nippon Ham Fighters	Hiromitsu Ochiai (Lotte Orions	Steve Ontiveros (Seibu Lions	Hiromichi Ishige (Seibu Lions	Hiromasa Arai (Nankai Hawks	Yutaka Fukumoto (Hankyu Braves	Shigeru Kurihashi (Kintetsu Buffaloes	Tony Solaita (Nippon Ham Fighters)	
1983	Osamu Higashio (Seibu Lions)	Nobuyuki Kagawa (Nankai Hawks)	Hiromitsu Ochiai (Lotte Orions)	Daijiro Oishi (Kintetsu Buffaloes)	Steve Ontiveros (Seibu Lions)	Hiromichi Ishige (Seibu Lions)	Koji Minoda (Hankyu Braves)	Makoto Shimada (Nippon Ham Fighters)	Terry Whitfield (Seibu Lions)	Hiromitsu Kadota† (Nankai Hawks)	
1984	Yutaro Imai (Hankyu Braves)	Hiromasa Fujita (Hankyu Braves)	Greg Wells (Hankyu Braves)	Daijiro Oishi (Kintetsu Buffaloes)	Hiromitsu Ochiai (Lotte Orions)	Keijiro Yumioka (Hankyu Braves)	Tommy Cruz (Nippon Ham Fighters)	Koji Minoda (Hankyu Braves)	Hideaki Takazawa (Lotte Orions)	Leron Lee (Lotte Orions)	
1985	Osamu Higashio (Seibu Lions)	Tsutomu Ito (Seibu Lions)	Dick Davis (Kintetsu Buffaloes)	Norifumi Nishimura (Lotte Orions)	Hiromitsu Ochiai (Lotte Orions)	Hiromichi Ishige (Seibu Lions)	Eiji Kanamori (Seibu Lions)	Terumitsu Kumano (Hankyu Braves)	Masashi Yokota (Lotte Orions)	Leron Lee (Lotte Orions)	
1986	Hisanobu Watanabe (Seibu Lions)	Tsutomu Ito (Seibu Lions)	Greg Wells (Hankyu Braves)	Hatsuhiko Tsuji (Seibu Lions)	Hiromitsu Ochiai (Lotte Orions)	Hiromichi Ishige (Seibu Lions)	Koji Akiyama (Seibu Lions)	Hiromasa Arai (Kintetsu Buffaloes)	Masashi Yokota (Lotte Orions)	Kazuhiko Ishimine (Hankyu Braves)	
1987	Kimiyasu Kudo (Seibu Lions)	Tsutomu Ito (Seibu Lions)	Greg Wells (Hankyu Braves)	Kazuyuki Shirai (Nippon Ham Fighters)	Hiromichi Ishige (Seibu Lions)	Yoshio Mizukami (Lotte Orions)	Koji Akiyama (Seibu Lions)	Hiromasa Arai (Kintetsu Buffaloes)	Tony Brewer (Nippon Ham Fighters)	Kazuhiko Ishimine (Hankyu Braves)	
1988	Yukihiro Nishizaki (Nippon Ham Fighters)	Tsutomu Ito (Seibu Lions)	Kazuhiro Kiyohara (Seibu Lions)	Junichi Fukura (Hankyu Braves)	Hiromi Matsunaga (Hankyu Braves)	Yukio Tanaka (Nippon Ham Fighters)	Koji Akiyama (Seibu Lions)	Ken Hirano (Seibu Lions)	Hideaki Takazawa (Lotte Orions)	Hiromitsu Kadota† (Nankai Hawks)	
1989	Hideyuki Awano (Kintetsu Buffaloes)	Kazuhiko Yamashita (Kintetsu Buffaloes)	Greg Wells (Orix Braves)	Hatsuhiko Tsuji (Seibu Lions)	Hiromi Matsunaga (Orix Braves)	Norio Tanabe (Seibu Lions)	Koji Akiyama (Seibu Lions)	Ralph Bryant (Kintetsu Buffaloes)	Yasuo Fujii (Orix Braves)	Hiromitsu Kadota† (Orix Braves)	
1990	Hideo Nomo (Kintetsu Buffaloes)	Tsutomu Ito (Seibu Lions)	Kazuhiro Kiyohara (Seibu Lions)	Daijiro Oishi (Kintetsu Buffaloes)	Hiromi Matsunaga (Orix Braves)	Yukio Tanaka (Nippon Ham Fighters)	Koji Akiyama (Seibu Lions)	Kazuhiko Ishimine (Orix Braves)	Norifumi Nishimura (Lotte Orions)	Orestes Destrade (Seibu Lions)	
1991	Taigen Kaku (Seibu Lions)	Tsutomu Ito (Seibu Lions)	Jim Traber (Kintetsu Buffaloes)	Hatsuhiko Tsuji (Seibu Lions)	Hiromi Matsunaga (Orix BlueWave)	Hirofumi Ogawa (Orix BlueWave)	Koji Akiyama (Seibu Lions)	Mitsuchika Hirai (Lotte Orions)	Makoto Sasaki (Fukuoka Daiei Hawks)	Orestes Destrade (Seibu Lions)	
1992	Takehiro Ishii (Seibu Lions)	Tsutomu Ito (Seibu Lions)	Kazuhiro Kiyohara (Seibu Lions)	Hatsuhiko Tsuji (Seibu Lions)	Hiromichi Ishige (Seibu Lions)	Norio Tanabe (Seibu Lions)	Koji Akiyama (Seibu Lions)	Makoto Sasaki (Fukuoka Daiei Hawks)	Satoshi Takahashi (Orix BlueWave)	Orestes Destrade (Seibu Lions)	
1993	Kimiyasu Kudo (Seibu Lions)	Fujio Tamura (Nippon Ham Fighters)	Hiroo Ishii (Kintetsu Buffaloes)	Hatsuhiko Tsuji (Seibu Lions)	Hiromichi Ishige (Seibu Lions)	Tetsuro Hirose (Nippon Ham Fighters)	Koji Akiyama (Seibu Lions)	Yasuo Fujii (Orix BlueWave)	Makoto Sasaki (Fukuoka Daiei Hawks)	Ralph Bryant (Kintetsu Buffaloes)	
1994	Hideki Irabu (Chiba Lotte Marines)	Koichiro Yoshinaga (Fukuoka Daiei Hawks)	Hiroo Ishii (Kintetsu Buffaloes)	Junichi Fukura (Orix BlueWave)	Hiromi Matsunaga (Fukuoka Daiei Hawks)	Tetsuro Hirose (Nippon Ham Fighters)	Kevin Reimer (Fukuoka Daiei Hawks)	Makoto Sasaki (Seibu Lions)	Ichiro Suzuki (Orix BlueWave)	Ralph Bryant (Kintetsu Buffaloes)	
1995	Hideki Irabu (Chiba Lotte Marines)	Satoshi Nakajima (Orix BlueWave)	Julio Franco (Chiba Lotte Marines)	Hiroki Kokubo (Fukuoka Daiei Hawks)	Kiyoshi Hatsushiba (Chiba Lotte Marines)	Yukio Tanaka (Nippon Ham Fighters)	Darrin Jackson (Seibu Lions)	Makoto Sasaki (Seibu Lions)	Ichiro Suzuki (Orix BlueWave)	Troy Neel (Orix BlueWave)	
1996	Eric Hillman (Chiba Lotte Marines)	Koichiro Yoshinaga (Fukuoka Daiei Hawks)	Atsushi Kataoka (Nippon Ham Fighters)	Koichi Oshima (Orix BlueWave)	Norihiro Nakamura (Kintetsu Buffaloes)	Yukio Tanaka (Nippon Ham Fighters)	Arihito Muramatsu (Fukuoka Daiei Hawks)	Ichiro Suzuki (Orix BlueWave)	So Taguchi (Orix BlueWave)	Troy Neel (Orix BlueWave)	
1997	Fumiya Nishiguchi (Seibu Lions)	Tsutomu Ito (Seibu Lions)	Phil Clark (Kintetsu Buffaloes)	Hiroki Kokubo (Fukuoka Daiei Hawks)	Ken Suzuki (Seibu Lions)	Kazuo Matsui (Seibu Lions)	Tuffy Rhodes (Kintetsu Buffaloes)	Makoto Sasaki (Seibu Lions)	Ichiro Suzuki (Orix BlueWave)	Domingo Martinez (Seibu Lions)	
1998	Fumiya Nishiguchi (Seibu Lions)	Tsutomu Ito (Seibu Lions)	Phil Clark (Kintetsu Buffaloes)	Julio Franco (Chiba Lotte Marines)	Atsushi Kataoka (Nippon-Ham Fighters)	Kazuo Matsui (Seibu Lions)	Naoyuki Ohmura (Kintetsu Buffaloes)	Hiroshi Shibahara (Fukuoka Daiei Hawks)	Ichiro Suzuki (Orix BlueWave)	Nigel Wilson (Nippon-Ham Fighters)	
1999	Daisuke Matsuzaka (Seibu Lions)	Kenji Johjima (Fukuoka Daiei Hawks)	Michihiro Ogasawara (Nippon-Ham Fighters)	Makoto Kaneko (Nippon-Ham Fighters)	Norihiro Nakamura (Osaka Kintetsu Buffaloes)	Kazuo Matsui (Seibu Lions)	Tuffy Rhodes (Osaka Kintetsu Buffaloes)	Ichiro Suzuki (Orix BlueWave)	Yoshitomo Tani (Orix BlueWave)	Phil Clark (Osaka Kintetsu Buffaloes)	
2000	Daisuke Matsuzaka (Seibu Lions)	Kenji Johjima (Fukuoka Daiei Hawks)	Nobuhiko Matsunaka (Fukuoka Daiei Hawks)	Koichi Oshima (Orix BlueWave)	Norihiro Nakamura (Osaka Kintetsu Buffaloes)	Kazuo Matsui (Seibu Lions)	Sherman Obando (Nippon-Ham Fighters)	Hiroshi Shibahara (Fukuoka Daiei Hawks)	Ichiro Suzuki (Orix BlueWave)	Nigel Wilson (Nippon-Ham Fighters)	
2001	Daisuke Matsuzaka (Seibu Lions)	Kenji Johjima (Fukuoka Daiei Hawks)	Michihiro Ogasawara (Nippon-Ham Fighters)	Tadahito Iguchi (Fukuoka Daiei Hawks)	Norihiro Nakamura (Osaka Kintetsu Buffaloes)	Kazuo Matsui (Seibu Lions)	Koichi Isobe (Osaka Kintetsu Buffaloes)	Tuffy Rhodes (Osaka Kintetsu Buffaloes)	Yoshitomo Tani (Orix BlueWave)	Frank Bolick (Chiba Lotte Marines)	
2002	Jeremy Powell (Osaka Kintetsu Buffaloes)	Tsutomu Ito (Seibu Lions)	Alex Cabrera (Seibu Lions)	Hiroyuki Takagi (Seibu Lions)	Norihiro Nakamura (Osaka Kintetsu Buffaloes)	Kazuo Matsui (Seibu Lions)	Tatsuya Ozeki (Seibu Lions)	Tuffy Rhodes (Osaka Kintetsu Buffaloes)	Yoshitomo Tani (Orix BlueWave)	Kazuhiro Wada (Seibu Lions)	
2003	Kazumi Saito (Fukuoka Daiei Hawks)	Kenji Johjima (Daiei Hawks)	Nobuhiko Matsunaka (Daiei Hawks)	Tadahito Iguchi (Daiei Hawks)	Michihiro Ogasawara (Nippon-Ham Fighters)	Kazuo Matsui (Seibu Lions)	Tuffy Rhodes (Osaka Kintetsu Buffaloes)	Yoshitomo Tani (Orix BlueWave)	Kazuhiro Wada (Seibu Lions)	Alex Cabrera (Seibu Lions)	
2004	Hisashi Iwakuma (Osaka Kintetsu Buffaloes)	Kenji Johjima (Fukuoka Daiei Hawks)	Nobuhiko Matsunaka (Fukuoka Daiei Hawks)	Tadahito Iguchi (Fukuoka Daiei Hawks)	Michihiro Ogasawara (Hokkaido Nippon-Ham Fighters)	Munenori Kawasaki (Fukuoka Daiei Hawks)	Tsuyoshi Shinjo (Hokkaido Nippon Ham Fighters)	Yoshitomo Tani (Orix BlueWave)	Kazuhiro Wada (Seibu Lions)	Fernando Seguignol (Hokkaido Nippon-Ham Fighters)	
2005	Toshiya Sugiuchi (Fukuoka SoftBank Hawks)	Kenji Johjima (Fukuoka SoftBank Hawks)	Julio Zuleta (Fukuoka SoftBank Hawks)	Koichi Hori (Chiba Lotte Marines)	Tsuyoshi Nishioka (Chiba Lotte Marines)	Toshiaki Imae (Chiba Lotte Marines)	Matt Franco (Chiba Lotte Marines)	Katsuhiko Miyaji (Fukuoka SoftBank Hawks)	Kazuhiro Wada (Seibu Lions)	Nobuhiko Matsunaka (Fukuoka SoftBank Hawks)	
2006	Kazumi Saito (Fukuoka SoftBank Hawks)	Tomoya Satozaki (Chiba Lotte Marines)	Michihiro Ogasawara (Hokkaido Nippon-Ham Fighters)	Kensuke Tanaka (Hokkaido Nippon-Ham Fighters)	José Fernández (Tohoku Rakuten Golden Eagles)	Munenori Kawasaki (Fukuoka SoftBank Hawks)	Atsunori Inaba (Hokkaido Nippon-Ham Fighters)	Nobuhiko Matsunaka (Fukuoka SoftBank Hawks)	Kazuhiro Wada (Seibu Lions)	Fernando Seguignol (Hokkaido Nippon-Ham Fighters)	
2007	Yu Darvish (Hokkaido Nippon-Ham Fighters)	Tomoya Satozaki (Chiba Lotte Marines)	Alex Cabrera (Seibu Lions)	Kensuke Tanaka (Hokkaido Nippon-Ham Fighters)	Greg LaRocca (Orix Buffaloes)	Tsuyoshi Nishioka (Chiba Lotte Marines)	Atsunori Inaba (Hokkaido Nippon-Ham Fighters)	Hichori Morimoto (Hokkaido Nippon-Ham Fighters)	Naoyuki Ohmura (Fukuoka SoftBank Hawks)	Takeshi Yamasaki (Tohoku Rakuten Golden Eagles)	
2008	Hisashi Iwakuma (Tohoku Rakuten Golden Eagles)	Toru Hosokawa (Saitama Seibu Lions)	Alex Cabrera (Orix Buffaloes)	Yasuyuki Kataoka (Saitama Seibu Lions)	Takeya Nakamura (Saitama Seibu Lions)	Hiroyuki Nakajima (Saitama Seibu Lions)	Takumi Kuriyama (Saitama Seibu Lions)	Rick Short (Tohoku Rakuten Golden Eagles)	Atsunori Inaba (Hokkaido Nippon-Ham Fighters)	Tuffy Rhodes (Orix Buffaloes)	
2009	Yu Darvish (Hokkaido Nippon-Ham Fighters)	Hidenori Tanoue (Fukuoka SoftBank Hawks)	Shinji Takahashi (Hokkaido Nippon-Ham Fighters)	Kensuke Tanaka (Hokkaido Nippon-Ham Fighters)	Takeya Nakamura (Saitama Seibu Lions)	Hiroyuki Nakajima (Saitama Seibu Lions)	Atsunori Inaba (Hokkaido Nippon-Ham Fighters)	Yoshio Itoi (Hokkaido Nippon-Ham Fighters)	Teppei Tsuchiya (Tohoku Rakuten Golden Eagles)	Takeshi Yamasaki (Tohoku Rakuten Golden Eagles)	
2010	Tsuyoshi Wada (Fukuoka SoftBank Hawks)	Motohiro Shima (Tohoku Rakuten Golden Eagles)	Alex Cabrera (Orix Buffaloes)	Kensuke Tanaka (Hokkaido Nippon-Ham Fighters)	Eiichi Koyano (Hokkaido Nippon-Ham Fighters)	Tsuyoshi Nishioka (Chiba Lotte Marines)	Hitoshi Tamura (Fukuoka SoftBank Hawks)	Takahiro Okada (Orix Buffaloes)	Takumi Kuriyama (Saitama Seibu Lions)	Kazuya Fukuura (Chiba Lotte Marines)	
2011	Masahiro Tanaka (Tohoku Rakuten Golden Eagles)	Toru Hosokawa (Fukuoka SoftBank Hawks)	Hiroki Kokubo (Fukuoka SoftBank Hawks)	Yuichi Honda (Fukuoka SoftBank Hawks)	Takeya Nakamura (Saitama Seibu Lions)	Hiroyuki Nakajima (Saitama Seibu Lions)	Yoshio Itoi (Hokkaido Nippon-Ham Fighters)	Seiichi Uchikawa (Fukuoka SoftBank Hawks)	Takumi Kuriyama (Seibu Lions)	Jose Fernandez (Saitama Seibu Lions)	
2012	Mitsuo Yoshikawa (Hokkaido Nippon-Ham Fighters)	Shinya Tsuruoka (Nippon Ham Fighters)	Dae-ho Lee (Orix Buffaloes)	Kensuke Tanaka (Hokkaido Nippon-Ham Fighters)	Takeya Nakamura (Saitama Seibu Lions)	Hiroyuki Nakajima (Saitama Seibu Lions)	Yoshio Itoi (Hokkaido Nippon-Ham Fighters)	Katsuya Kakunaka (Chiba Lotte Marines)	Seiichi Uchikawa (Fukuoka SoftBank Hawks)	Wily Mo Peña (Fukuoka SoftBank Hawks)	
2013	Masahiro Tanaka (Tohoku Rakuten Golden Eagles)	Motohiro Shima (Tohoku Rakuten Golden Eagles)	Hideto Asamura * (Saitama Seibu Lions)	Kazuya Fujita (Tohoku Rakuten Golden Eagles)	Casey McGehee (Tohoku Rakuten Golden Eagles)	Daichi Suzuki (Chiba Lotte Marines)	Sho Nakata (Hokkaido Nippon-Ham Fighters)	Yuya Hasegawa (Fukuoka SoftBank Hawks)	Seiichi Uchikawa (Fukuoka SoftBank Hawks)	Michel Abreu (Hokkaido Nippon-Ham Fighters)	
2014	Chihiro Kaneko (Orix Buffaloes)	Hikaru Ito (Orix Buffaloes)	Ernesto Mejía (Saitama Seibu Lions)	Kazuya Fujita (Tohoku Rakuten Golden Eagles)	Ginji Akaminai (Tohoku Rakuten Golden Eagles)	Kenta Imamiya (Fukuoka SoftBank Hawks)	Sho Nakata (Hokkaido Nippon-Ham Fighters)	Yoshio Itoi (Orix Buffaloes)	Yuki Yanagita (Fukuoka SoftBank Hawks)	Takeya Nakamura (Saitama Seibu Lions)	
2015	Shohei Ohtani (Hokkaido Nippon-Ham Fighters)	Ginjiro Sumitani (Saitama Seibu Lions)	Sho Nakata (Hokkaido Nippon-Ham Fighters)	Kensuke Tanaka (Hokkaido Nippon-Ham Fighters)	Takeya Nakamura (Saitama Seibu Lions)	Takuya Nakashima (Hokkaido Nippon-Ham Fighters)	Shogo Akiyama (Saitama Seibu Lions)	Ikuhiro Kiyota (Chiba Lotte Marines)	Yuki Yanagita (Fukuoka SoftBank Hawks)	Dae-ho Lee (Fukuoka SoftBank Hawks)	
2016	Shohei Ohtani (Hokkaido Nippon-Ham Fighters)	Tatsuhiro Tamura (Chiba Lotte Marines)	Sho Nakata (Hokkaido Nippon-Ham Fighters)	Hideto Asamura * (Saitama Seibu Lions)	Brandon Laird (Hokkaido Nippon-Ham Fighters)	Daichi Suzuki (Chiba Lotte Marines)	Katsuya Kakunaka (Chiba Lotte Marines)	Yoshio Itoi (Orix Buffaloes)	Haruki Nishikawa (Hokkaido Nippon-Ham Fighters)	Shohei Ohtani (Hokkaido Nippon-Ham Fighters)	
2017	Yusei Kikuchi (Saitama Seibu Lions)	Takuya Kai (Fukuoka SoftBank Hawks)	Ginji Akaminai (Tohoku Rakuten Golden Eagles)	Hideto Asamura * (Saitama Seibu Lions)	Zelous Wheeler (Tohoku Rakuten Golden Eagles)	Kenta Imamiya (Fukuoka SoftBank Hawks)	Yuki Yanagita (Fukuoka SoftBank Hawks)	Shogo Akiyama (Saitama Seibu Lions)	Haruki Nishikawa (Hokkaido Nippon-Ham Fighters)	Alfredo Despaigne (Fukuoka SoftBank Hawks)	
2018	Yusei Kikuchi (Saitama Seibu Lions)	Tomoya Mori (Saitama Seibu Lions)	Hotaka Yamakawa (Saitama Seibu Lions)	Hideto Asamura * (Saitama Seibu Lions)	Nobuhiro Matsuda (Fukuoka SoftBank Hawks)	Sosuke Genda (Saitama Seibu Lions)	Yuki Yanagita (Fukuoka SoftBank Hawks)	Shogo Akiyama (Saitama Seibu Lions)	Masataka Yoshida (Orix Buffaloes)	Kensuke Kondo (Hokkaido Nippon-Ham Fighters)	
2019	Kodai Senga (Fukuoka SoftBank Hawks)	Tomoya Mori (Seibu Lions)	Hotaka Yamakawa (Seibu Lions)	Hideto Asamura * (Tohoku Rakuten Golden Eagles)	Takeya Nakamura (Saitama Seibu Lions)	Sosuke Genda (Saitama Seibu Lions)	Takashi Ogino (Chiba Lotte Marines)	Shogo Akiyama (Saitama Seibu Lions)	Masataka Yoshida (Orix Buffaloes)	Alfredo Despaigne (Fukuoka SoftBank Hawks)	
2020	Kodai Senga (Fukuoka SoftBank Hawks)	Takuya Kai (Fukuoka SoftBank Hawks)	Sho Nakata (Hokkaido Nippon-Ham Fighters)	Hideto Asamura * (Tohoku Rakuten Golden Eagles)	Daichi Suzuki (Tohoku Rakuten Golden Eagles)	Sosuke Genda (Saitama Seibu Lions)	Yuki Yanagita (Fukuoka Softbank Hawks)	Kensuke Kondo (Hokkaido Nippon-Ham Fighters)	Masataka Yoshida (Orix Buffaloes)	Takumi Kuriyama (Saitama Seibu Lions)	
2021	Yoshinobu Yamamoto (Orix Buffaloes)	Tomoya Mori (Saitama Seibu Lions)	Brandon Laird (Chiba Lotte Marines)	Shogo Nakamura (Chiba Lotte Marines)	Yuma Mune (Orix Buffaloes)	Sosuke Genda (Saitama Seibu Lions)	Yuki Yanagita (Fukuoka SoftBank Hawks)	Yutaro Sugimoto (Orix Buffaloes)	Masataka Yoshida (Orix Buffaloes)	Kensuke Kondo (Hokkaido Nippon-Ham Fighters)	
2022	Yoshinobu Yamamoto (Orix Buffaloes)	Takuya Kai (Fukuoka SoftBank Hawks)	Hotaka Yamakawa (Saitama Seibu Lions)	Hideto Asamura * (Tohoku Rakuten Golden Eagles)	Yuma Mune (Orix Buffaloes)	Kenta Imamiya (Fukuoka SoftBank Hawks)	Yuki Yanagita (Fukuoka SoftBank Hawks)	Go Matsumoto (Hokkaido Nippon-Ham Fighters)	Hiroaki Shimauchi (Tohoku Rakuten Golden Eagles)	Masataka Yoshida (Orix Buffaloes)	
2023	Yoshinobu Yamamoto (Orix Buffaloes)	Tomoya Mori (Orix Buffaloes)	Yuma Tongu (Orix Buffaloes)	Hideto Asamura * (Tohoku Rakuten Golden Eagles)	Yuma Mune (Orix Buffaloes)	Kotaro Kurebayashi (Orix Buffaloes)	Yuki Yanagita (Fukuoka SoftBank Hawks)	Chusei Mannami (Hokkaido Nippon-Ham Fighters)	Kensuke Kondo (Fukuoka SoftBank Hawks)	Gregory Polanco (Chiba Lotte Marines)	
2024	Kohei Arihara (Fukuoka Softbank Hawks)	Toshiya Satoh (Chiba Lotte Marines)	Hotaka Yamakawa (Fukuoka SoftBank Hawks)	Hiroto Kobukata (Tohoku Rakuten Golden Eagles)	Ryoya Kurihara (Fukuoka SoftBank Hawks)	Kenta Imamiya (Fukuoka SoftBank Hawks)	Ryosuke Tatsumi (Tohoku Rakuten Golden Eagles)	Ukyo Shuto (Fukuoka SoftBank Hawks)	Kensuke Kondo (Fukuoka SoftBank Hawks)	Franmil Reyes (Hokkaido Nippon-Ham Fighters)	
2025	Livan Moinelo (Fukuoka SoftBank Hawks)	Kenya Wakatsuki (Orix Buffaloes)	Tyler Nevin (Saitama Seibu Lions)	Taisei Makihara (Fukuoka SoftBank Hawks)	Itsuki Murabayashi (Tohoku Rakuten Golden Eagles)	Rui Muneyama (Tohoku Rakuten Golden Eagles)	Ukyo Shuto (Fukuoka SoftBank Hawks)	Keita Nakagawa (Orix Buffaloes)	Tatsuru Yanagimachi (Fukuoka SoftBank Hawks)	Franmil Reyes (Hokkaido Nippon-Ham Fighters)	

== Best Nine Awards by count ==
Pink indicate team that no longer exists

Team	League	# of players to win Best Nine
Yomiuri Giants (Note: Formerly known as Tokyo Kyojin)	JBL / Central	213
Saitama Seibu Lions (Note: Formerly known as Nishitetsu Clippers, Nishitetsu Lions, Taiheiyo Club Lions, Crown Lighter Lions, Seibu Lions)	Pacific	161
Fukuoka SoftBank Hawks (Note: Formerly known as Nankai Club, Kinki Nippon Club, Great Ring, Nankai Hawks, Fukuoka Daiei Hawks)	JBL/Pacific	154
Orix Buffaloes (Note: Formerly known as Hankyu Club, Hankyu Braves, the Orix Braves, Orix BlueWave)	Pacific	130
Hanshin Tigers (Note: Formerly known as Osaka Tigers, Hanshin Club)	JBL / Central	119
Chunichi Dragons (Note: Formerly known as Nagoya Dragons)	Central	114
Hokkaido Nippon-Ham Fighters (Note: Formerly known as Senators, Tokyu Flyers, Kyuei Flyers, Toei Flyers, Nittaku Home Flyers, Nippon-Ham Fighters)	Pacific	106
Chiba Lotte Marines (Note: Formerly known as Mainichi Orions, Mainichi Daiei Orions, Tokyo Orions, Lotte Orions)	Pacific	103
Hiroshima Toyo Carp (Note: Formerly known as Hiroshima Carp)	Central	98
Tokyo Yakult Swallows (Note: Formerly known as Kokutestu Swallows, Sankei Swallows, Sankei Atoms, Tokyo Swallows)	Central	93
Yokohama DeNA BayStars (Note: Formerly known as Yokohama BayStars, Yokohama Taiyo Whales, Taiyo Whales, Yosho Robins, Taiyo Shochiku Robins, Taiyo Whales)	Central	70
Osaka Kintetsu Buffaloes	Pacific	59
Tohoku Rakuten Golden Eagles	Pacific	26
Lion / Shochiku Robins	JBL / CL	6
Kinsei / Daiei Stars	JBL/PL	5
Tsubasa Baseball Club	JBL	1

== See also ==
- Baseball awards § Japan
