= Takai (surname) =

Takai (written: 高井) is a Japanese surname. Notable people with the surname include:

- Fernanda Takai (born 1971), Brazilian singer
- Kazuma Takai (高井 和馬; born 1994), Japanese footballer
- Kōta Takai (高井 幸大; born 2004), Japanese international footballer
- Mamiko Takai (高井 麻巳子; born 1966), Japanese idol and singer
- Mark Takai (1967–2016), American politician
- Miho Takai (高井 美穂; born 1971), Japanese politician
- Teri Takai, American politician
- Yasuhiro Takai (高井 保弘; 1945–2019), Japanese baseball player
- Yohei Takai (高井 洋平; born 1982), Japanese judoka
- Yuhei Takai (高井 雄平; born 1984), Japanese baseball player
- Yuichi Takai (高井 有一; 1932–2016), Japanese writer
