= Higashide =

Higashide (written: 東出) is a Japanese surname. Notable people with the surname include:

- Akihiro Higashide (東出 輝裕; born 1980), Japanese baseball player
- Noriko Higashide (東出 典子; born 1963), Japanese actress
