= Koichiro Yoshinaga =

Japanese baseball player (born 1969)

- Catcher / Infielder
- Born: May 1, 1969; Hirakata, Osaka, Japan
- Batted: Left Threw: Right

NPB debut
- April 10, 1990, for the Nankai Hawks

Last appearance
- April 26, 2003, for the Yomiuri Giants

NPB statistics (through 2003)
- Batting average: .278
- Hits: 1057
- Home runs: 153
- Runs batted in: 505
- Stolen base: 4

Teams
- Nankai Hawks / Fukuoka Daiei Hawks (1988–2000); Yomiuri Giants (2001–2003)

Career highlights and awards
- 3× Pacific League Best Nine Award (1994, 1996); 6× NPB All-Star (1992–1994, 1996, 1997, 1999)

Koichiro Yoshinaga (吉永 幸一郎, Yoshinaga Koichiro, born May 1, 1969) is a Japanese former Nippon Professional Baseball catcher/infielder.
