= Taira Fujita =

Japanese baseball player

- Infielder / Manager
- Born: October 19, 1947; Wakayama, Wakayama, Japan
- Batted: Left Threw: Right

NPB debut
- April 10, 1966, for the Hanshin Tigers

Last appearance
- September 20, 1984, for the Hanshin Tigers

NPB statistics
- Batting average: .286
- Hits: 2,064
- Home runs: 207
- Runs batted in: 802
- Stolen base: 85

Teams
- As player: Hanshin Tigers (1966–1984); As manager: Hanshin Tigers (1996); As coach: Hanshin Tigers (1981–1984, 1995)

Career highlights and awards
- 7× Central League Best Nine Award (1967, 1969–1971, 1973–1974, 1981); 3× Central League Diamond Glove Award (1973, 1975, 1981); Comeback Player of the Year (1981); 8× NPB All-Star (1967, 1969, 1971, 1973–1976, 1981)

Taira Fujita (藤田 平, Fujita Taira; born October 19, 1947 in Wakayama, Wakayama, Japan) is a Japanese former Nippon Professional Baseball infielder.

== See also ==
- List of Nippon Professional Baseball career hits leaders
