= Takayoshi Nakao =

Japanese baseball player (born 1956)

Takayoshi Nakao 中尾 孝義
- Catcher / Coach
- Born: February 16, 1956 (age 70); Kasai, Hyōgo, Japan
- Batted: Right Threw: Right

NPB debut
- April 4, 1981, for the Chunichi Dragons

Last appearance
- October 24, 1993, for the Seibu Lions

NPB statistics (through 1993)
- Batting average: .263
- Hits: 699
- RBIs: 335
- Stats at Baseball Reference

Teams
- As player: Chunichi Dragons (1981–1988); Yomiuri Giants (1989–1992); Seibu Lions (1992–1993); As coach: Seibu Lions (1995–1998); Mercuries Tigers (1999); Yokohama BayStars (2000–2001); Orix BlueWave (2002–2003); Hanshin Tigers (2004–2006)

Career highlights and awards
- Central League MVP (1982); Comeback Player of the Year (1989); 3× NPB All-Star (1982, 1984, 1989); 2× Best Nine Award (1982, 1989); 2× Mitsui Golden Glove Award (1982, 1989)

Takayoshi Nakao (中尾 孝義, Nakao Takayoshi, born February 16, 1956) is a former Japanese professional baseball player. He was a catcher. In 1982, he was the MVP of the Central League.

His career lasted 13 seasons, from 1981 to 1993.
