= Shozo Doi =

Japanese baseball player and manager

- Second baseman
- Born: June 28, 1942; Kobe, Hyōgo, Japan
- Died: September 25, 2009 (aged 67); Tokyo, Japan
- Batted: Right Threw: Right

NPB debut
- April 12, 1965, for the Yomiuri Giants

Last NPB appearance
- October 6, 1978, for the Yomiuri Giants

NPB statistics (through 1978)
- Batting average: .263
- Home runs: 65
- Hits: 1275

Teams
- As player: Yomiuri Giants (1965–1978); As manager: Orix BlueWave (1991–1993); As coach: Yomiuri Giants (1976–1980, 1986–1988, 1996–1988)

Career highlights and awards
- 4× NPB All-Star (1967-1969, 1973); 2× Best Nine Award (1968-1969); 1× Diamond Glove Award (1978)

Shozo Doi (土井 正三, Doi Shōzō; June 28, 1942 – September 25, 2009) was a former Japanese baseball player. He played for the Yomiuri Giants in the Nippon Professional Baseball.

He was highly hated during his time as manager of the Orix BlueWave from 1991 to 1993 because he replaced longtime manager Toshiharu Ueda, who led the team to their 3 Japan Series titles under Hankyu. He alienated star player Greg "Boomer" Wells, an 8-year NPB veteran and Triple Crown winner, eventually leading Wells to request a trade to the Fukuoka Daiei Hawks. From then on, the furious BlueWave fans would constantly taunt Doi when he took the field. Doi is also infamous for his refusal to play a young Ichiro Suzuki because of his unwillingness to accept Ichiro’s unorthodox swing. Doi was fired in 1993, and his successor, Akira Ōgi, immediately inserted Ichiro into the lineup every day, and he quickly blossomed into a superstar, leading to them winning the Pacific League pennant in 1995 and 1996, winning the Japan Series in the latter year.
