= Yūki Okabayashi =

Japanese baseball player (born 2002)

Yūki Okabayashi 岡林 勇希
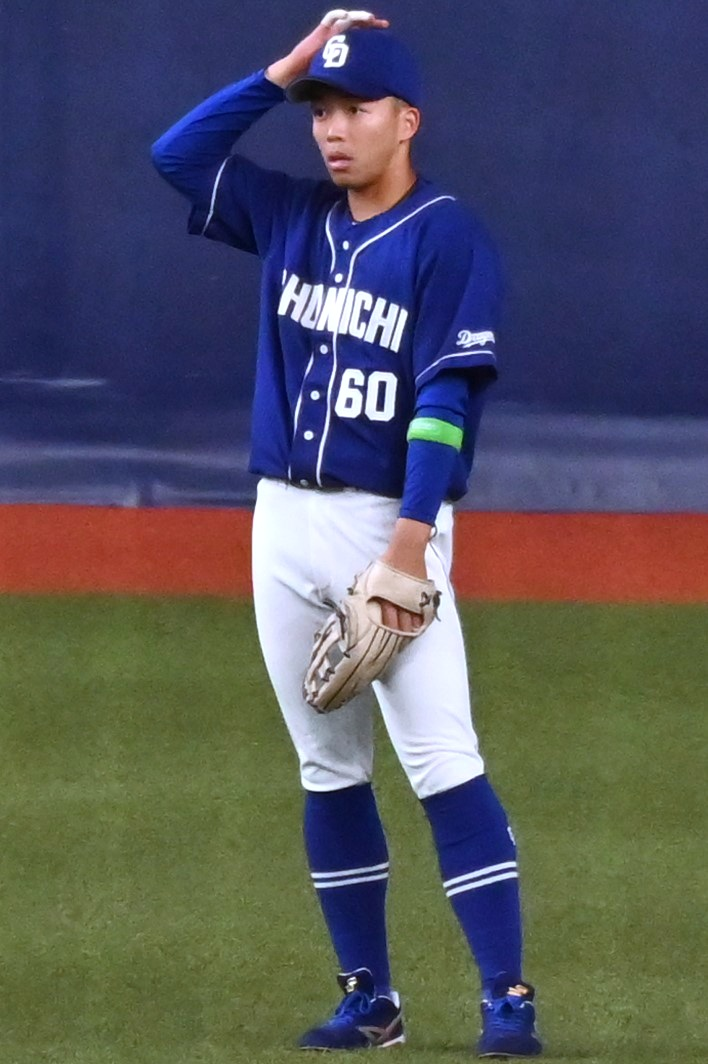

Chunichi Dragons – No. 1
- Outfielder / Pitcher
- Born: February 22, 2002 (age 24); Matsuzaka, Mie, Japan
- Bats: Left Throws: Right

NPB debut
- July 19, 2020, for the Chunichi Dragons

NPB statistics (through July 26, 2026)
- Batting average: .277
- Home runs: 9
- Runs batted in: 127
- Stolen bases: 66

Teams
- Chunichi Dragons (2020–present)

Career highlights and awards
- NPB All-Star (2025); 2× Central League Golden Glove Award (2022-2023); 3× Central League Best Nine Award (2022-2023, 2025)

Yūki Okabayashi (岡林 勇希, Okabayashi Yūki; born February 22, 2002) is a Japanese professional baseball outfielder for the Chunichi Dragons of Nippon Professional Baseball (NPB).

== Career ==
On 17 October 2019, Okabayashi was selected as the 5th draft pick for the Chunichi Dragons at the 2019 NPB Draft and on 8 November signed a provisional contract with a ¥30,000,000 sign-on bonus and a ¥5,500,000 yearly salary.

Although originally selected as a pitcher, it became known that the Dragons would register him as an outfielder in the lead-up to the 2020 Spring camp. He has been named to the Best Nine Award three times, most recently in 2025.
