= Daijiro Oishi =

Japanese baseball player and coach (born 1958)

- Second baseman / Manager
- Born: October 20, 1958 (age 68); Shizuoka, Shizuoka, Japan
- Batted: Right Threw: Right

NPB debut
- April 8, 1981, for the Kintetsu Buffaloes

Last NPB appearance
- September 11, 1997, for the Kintetsu Buffaloes

NPB statistics (through 1997)
- Batting average: .274
- Home runs: 148
- Hits: 1824
- Stats at Baseball Reference

Teams
- As player: Kintetsu Buffaloes (1981–1997); As manager: Orix Buffaloes (2008–2009); As coach: Osaka Kintetsu Buffaloes (2003–2004); Orix Buffaloes (2005–2008); Fukuoka SoftBank Hawks (2010–2013)

Career highlights and awards
- 1982 Pacific League Rookie of the Year; 9× NPB All-Star (1982–1984, 1986–1987, 1989–1990, 1992–1993); 4x Pacific League stolen base champion (1983–1984, 1987, 1993); 3× Best Nine Award (1983, 1984, 1990); 3× Mitsui Golden Glove Award (1982–1984)

Daijiro Oishi (大石 大二郎, Ōishi Daijirō; born October 20, 1958) is a professional Japanese baseball player from 1981 to 1997, and a coach and manager after his playing days ended.

Oishi was born in Shizuoka. He was an infielder for the Kintetsu Buffaloes for 16 seasons. He was the Pacific League's stolen bases leader during several seasons, beginning in 1983. He served as a coach for the Buffaloes from 2003 to 2008 before managing the Orix Buffaloes in 2008, managing two seasons.

Sporting positions
Preceded by Terry Collins	Orix Buffaloes manager 2008–2009	Succeeded by Akinobu Okada
