= Shūji Nishiyama =

Japanese baseball player (born 1967)

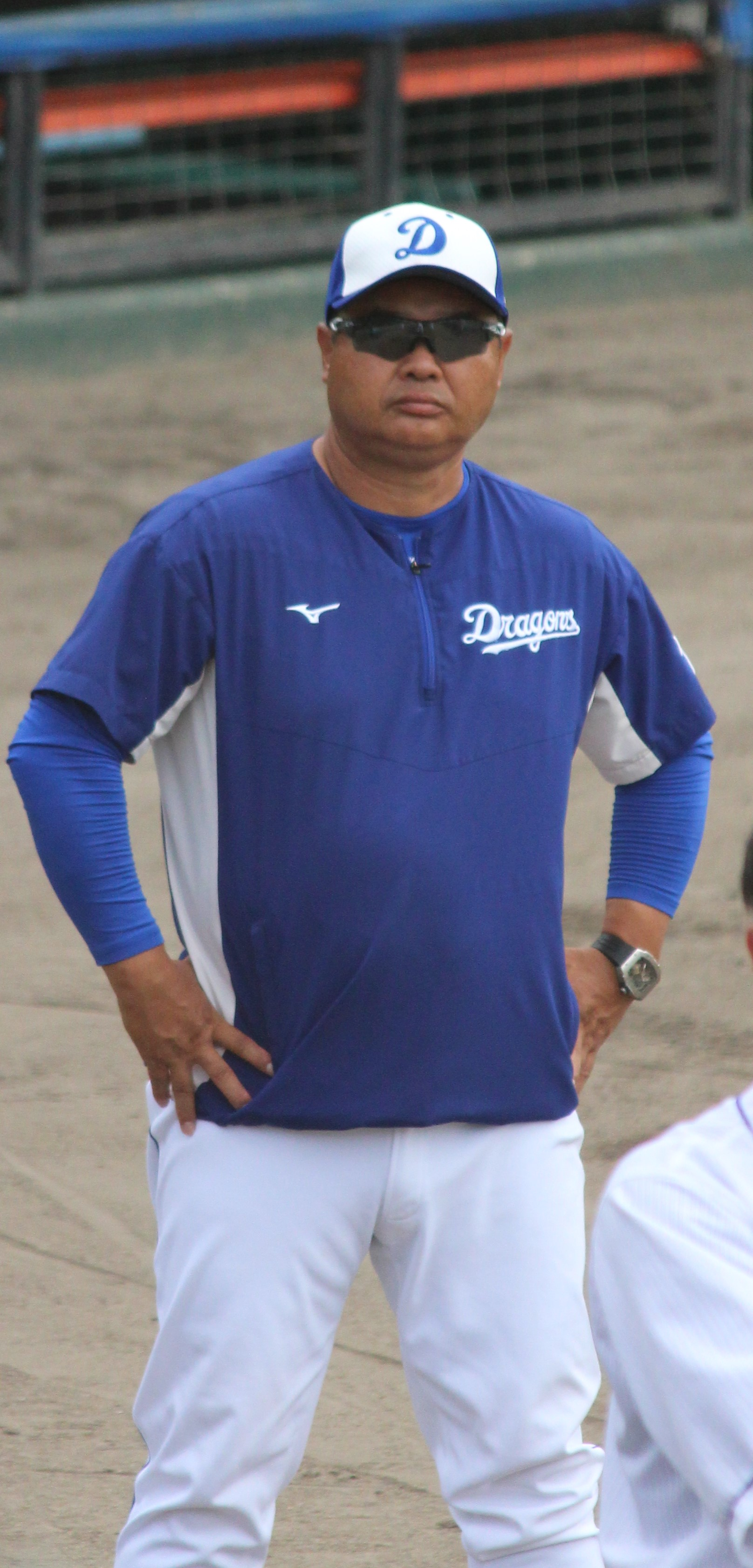
- Nishiyama overlooks BP in Chatan, Sep 2022
- Catcher / Coach
- Born: July 7, 1967 (age 58); Yao, Osaka, Japan
- Batted: Right Threw: Right

NPB debut
- August 26, 1989, for the Hiroshima Toyo Carp

Last appearance
- October 5, 2005, for the Yomiuri Giants

NPB statistics
- Batting average: .242
- Hits: 716
- Home runs: 50
- Runs batted in: 282
- Stolen base: 36
- Stats at Baseball Reference

Teams
- As player: Nankai Hawks (1986–1987); Hiroshima Toyo Carp (1987–2004); Yomiuri Giants (2005); As coach: Yomiuri Giants (2006–2010); Chunichi Dragons (2022–2023)

Career highlights and awards
- 2× Central League Best Nine Award (1994, 1996); 2× Central League Golden Glove Award (1994, 1996); 2× NPB All-Star (1994, 1996)

Shūji Nishiyama (西山 秀二, Nishiyama Shūji; born July 7, 1967 in Yao, Osaka) is a retired Japanese professional catcher.
