= Ken Suzuki =

Japanese baseball player (born 1970)

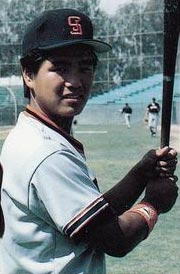
- Suzuki in 1988
- Infielder
- Born: January 13, 1970; Koshigaya, Saitama, Japan
- Batted: Left Threw: Right

NPB debut
- June 20, 1989, for the Seibu Lions

Last appearance
- October 4, 2007, for the Tokyo Yakult Swallows

NPB statistics
- Batting average: .278
- Hits: 1446
- Home runs: 189
- Runs batted in: 797
- Stolen base: 15

Teams
- As player: Seibu Lions (1989–2002); Yakult Swallows / Tokyo Yakult Swallows (2003–2007)

Career highlights and awards
- 3× NPB All-Star (1997, 1998, 2003); 2× Best Nine Award (1997, 2003); Comeback Player of the Year (2003); 4× Japan Series champion (1988, 1990, 1991, 1992)

Ken Suzuki (鈴木 健, Suzuki Ken; born January 13, 1970) is a Japanese former professional baseball infielder. He played in the California League for the San Jose Giants before playing 19 seasons in Nippon Professional Baseball.
