= Yuma Mune =

Japanese baseball player (born 1996)

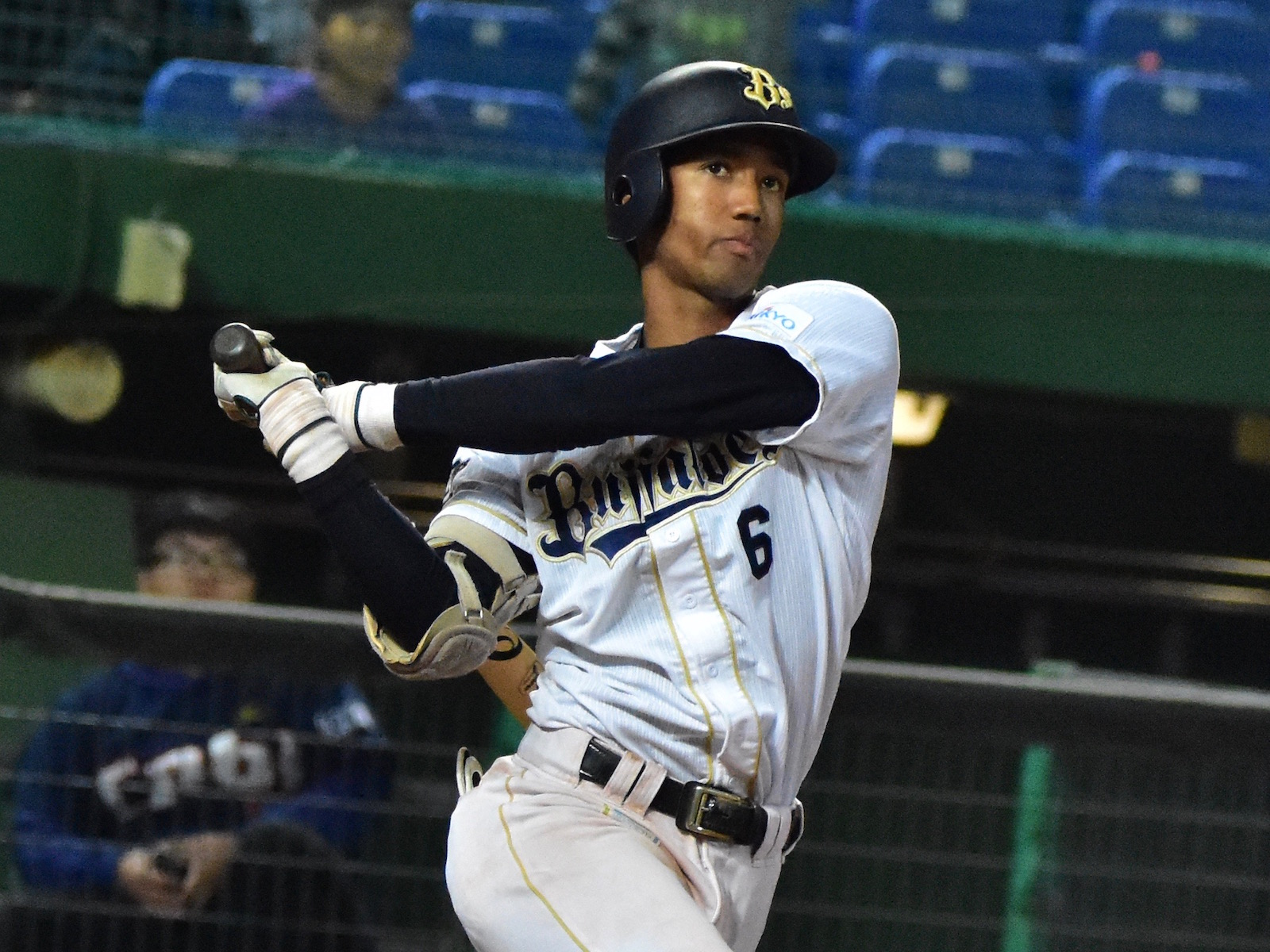

Orix Buffaloes – No. 6
- Infielder
- Born: June 7, 1996 (age 29); Musashino, Tokyo, Japan
- Bats: Left Throws: Right

NPB debut
- September 18, 2016, for the Orix Buffaloes

NPB statistics (through 2023 season)
- Batting average: .255
- Hits: 510
- Home runs: 24
- Runs batted in: 152
- Stolen bases: 28
- Stats at Baseball Reference

Teams
- Orix Buffaloes (2015–present)

Career highlights and awards
- 3× Pacific League Best Nine Award (2021–2023); 3× Pacific League Golden Glove Award (2021–2023); 1× NPB All-Star Fighting Player Award (2022); 1× NPB All-Star (2022); Japan Series champion (2022)

Yuma Mune (宗 佑磨, Mune Yuma; born June 7, 1996 in Musashino, Tokyo, Japan) is a professional Japanese baseball player. He plays infielder for the Orix Buffaloes.

Mune's father is Guinean and his mother is also of at least partial West African descent.
