= Akira Ejiri =

Japanese baseball player and manager (born 1943)

Akira Ejiri 江尻 亮
- Outfielder / Manager
- Born: January 10, 1943 (age 83); Takahagi, Ibaraki, Japan
- Batted: Left Threw: Left

NPB debut
- 1965, for the Taiyō Whales

Last appearance
- 1979, for the Yokohama Taiyō Whales

NPB statistics (through 1979)
- Batting average: .271
- Hits: 1249
- RBIs: 436
- Stats at Baseball Reference

Teams
- As player: Taiyō Whales/Yokohama Taiyō Whales (1965–1979); As coach: Yokohama Taiyō Whales (1980–1986, 1990–1992); Chiba Lotte Marines (1995); As manager: Yokohama Taiyō Whales (1992); Chiba Lotte Marines (1996)

Career highlights and awards
- 2× NPB All-Star (1970, 1973); 2× Best Nine Award (1970, 1973)

Akira Ejiri (江尻 亮, Ejiri Akira; born January 10, 1943) is a former professional baseball player from Japan. Ejiri played baseball for the Taiyo Whales. He eventually served as a manager for the Chiba Lotte Marines
