= Toshiyuki Mimura =

Japanese baseball player and manager (1948–2009)

- Shortstop / Manager
- Born: September 19, 1948
- Died: November 3, 2009 (aged 61)
- Batted: Right Threw: Right

NPB debut
- May 7, 1967, for the Hiroshima Carp

Last appearance
- October 24, 1983, for the Hiroshima Toyo Carp

NPB statistics (through 1983)
- Hits: 1245
- Home runs: 149
- Base on balls: 586
- Runs batted in: 490
- Stolen Bases: 49
- Batting average: .255
- Slugging percentage: .390

Teams
- As player: Hiroshima Carp/Hiroshima Toyo Carp (1967–1983); As manager: Hiroshima Toyo Carp (1994–1998); As coach: Hiroshima Toyo Carp (1984-1993, 2004-2005)

Career highlights and awards
- Regular season: 3× Central League Best Nine Award (1972, 1975, 1976); NPB Comeback Player of the Year Award (1979); 4× NPB All-Star Selections (1970, 1972, 1974, 1979)

Toshiyuki Mimura (三村 敏之, Mimura Toshiyuki) (September 19, 1948 – November 3, 2009) was a Japanese baseball player and manager of the Hiroshima Toyo Carp.

== Early life ==
Mimura was born in Kaita, Hiroshima.
