= Kazunori Shinozuka =

Japanese baseball player and coach (born 1957)

- Infielder / Coach
- Born: July 16, 1957 (age 68); Chōshi, Chiba, Japan
- Batted: Left Threw: Right

NPB debut
- August 5, 1977, for the Yomiuri Giants

Last NPB appearance
- October 26, 1994, for the Yomiuri Giants

NPB statistics (through 1994)
- Batting average: .304
- Home runs: 92
- Hits: 1696
- Stats at Baseball Reference

Teams
- As player: Yomiuri Giants (1976–1994); As coach: Yomiuri Giants (1995–2003, 2006–2010)

Career highlights and awards
- 2× Central League batting champion (1984, 1987); 5× Best Nine Award (1981–1982, 1984, 1986–1987); 4× Golden Glove Award (1981–1982, 1984, 1986); 9× NPB All-Star (1982–1989, 1991)

Kazunori "Toshio" Shinozuka (篠塚 和典, Shinozuka Kazunori; born July 16, 1957) is a former professional Japanese baseball player. As a boy, Ichiro Suzuki learned to pattern his original swinging pendulum leg kick after Shinozuka's.
