= Katsumi Fujimoto =

Japanese baseball player (born 1937)

- First baseman/Outfielder
- Born: August 8, 1937 (age 88); Minabe, Wakayama, Japan
- Bats: Right Throws: Right

Career statistics
- Batting average: .254
- Hits: 756
- Home runs: 113
- Runs batted in: 420

Teams
- Osaka/Hanshin Tigers (1956–1967)

Career highlights and awards
- Best Nine Award (1959)

Katsumi Fujimoto (藤本 勝巳, Fujimoto Katsumi; born August 8, 1937) is a former Japanese Nippon Professional Baseball first baseman and outfielder. He played for the Osaka/Hanshin Tigers from 1956 to 1967.
