= Mikio Kudō =

Japanese baseball player

- Pitcher/Outfielder
- Born: September 30, 1960; Honjō, Akita
- Died: May 13, 2016 (aged 55); Akita, Akita
- Batted: Right Threw: Right

NPB debut
- April 12, 1979, for the Nippon Ham Fighters

Last appearance
- April 12, 1984, for the Hippon Ham Fighters

NPB statistics
- Win–loss record: 30–22
- Earned run average: 3.74
- Strikeouts: 160
- Stats at Baseball Reference

Teams
- Nippon Ham Fighters (1979; 1981–1984)

Career highlights and awards
- 20-game winner (1982); Best Nine Award (1982); NPB Win Champion (1982); NPB Win Rate Champion (1982); 2x NPB Monthly MVP (1982); Korakuen MVP (1982); NPB All-Star (1982)

Mikio Kudō (工藤幹夫, Kudō Mikio; September 30, 1960 – May 13, 2016) was a Japanese professional baseball pitcher. He played five seasons in Nippon Professional Baseball, all for the Nippon Ham Fighters.

== Career ==
Kudo was selected out of Akita Prefectural Honjō High School as the second overall pick in the 1978 NPB draft, and made his professional debut that season, becoming the fastest player to ever make his Japanese professional debut. He went 20-4, leading the league in wins in 1982.

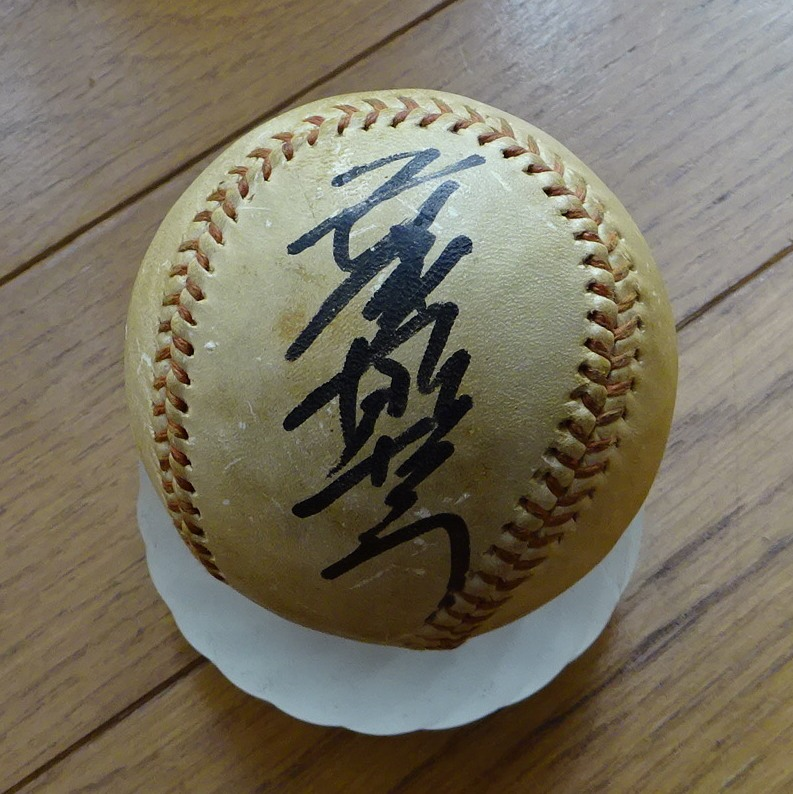
Kudo's autographed baseball

== Personal life ==
He ran a sports goods store named "Kudo Sports"(39°43′51.9″N 140°08′39.3″E) in Tegatayama Nakamachi, Akita City, and after his death, his widow Michiyo has taken charge of this shop. Official gym clothes of Hiroomote Elementary School, Sakura Junior High and Joto Junior High are available there.

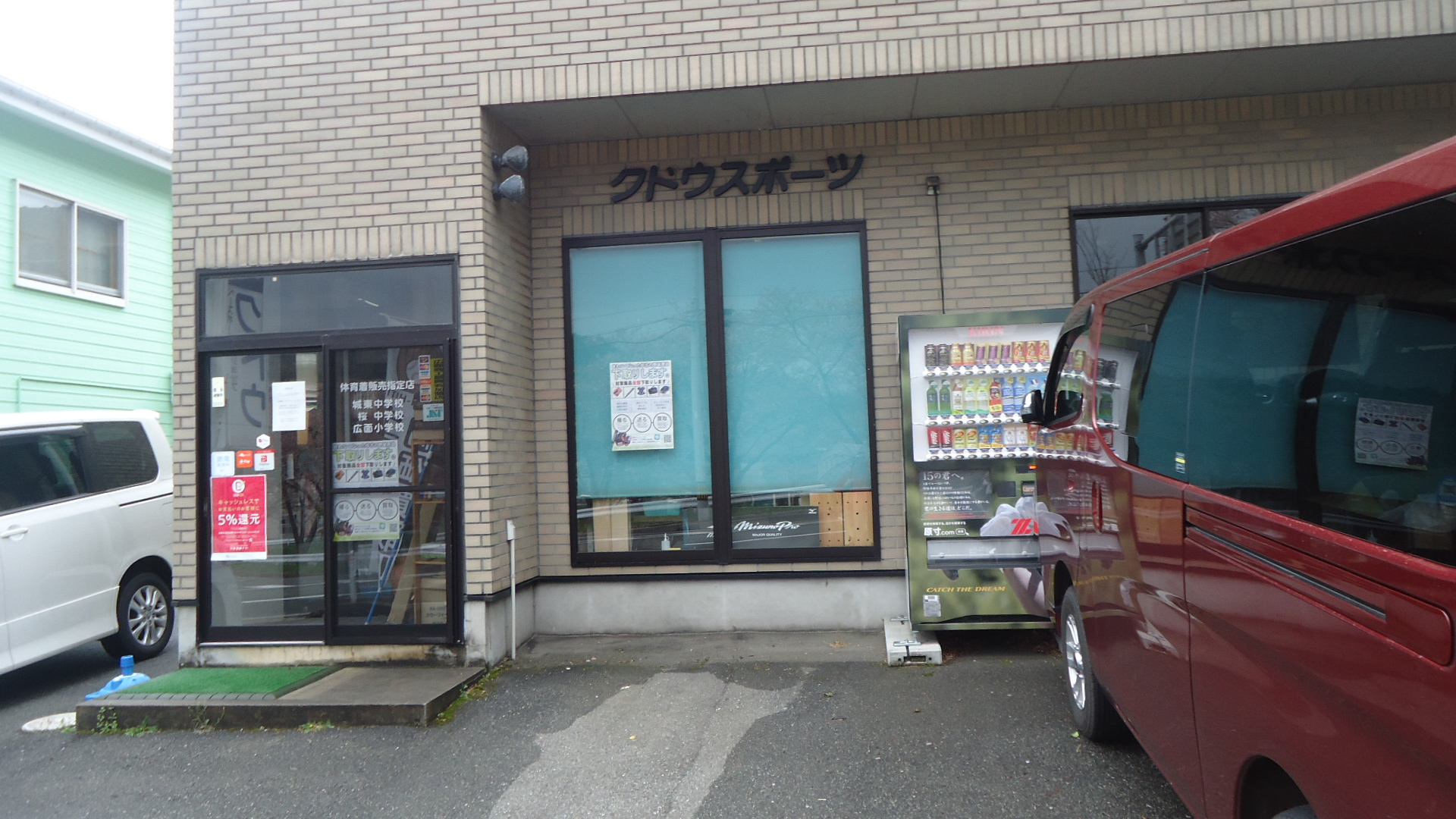
Kudo Sports

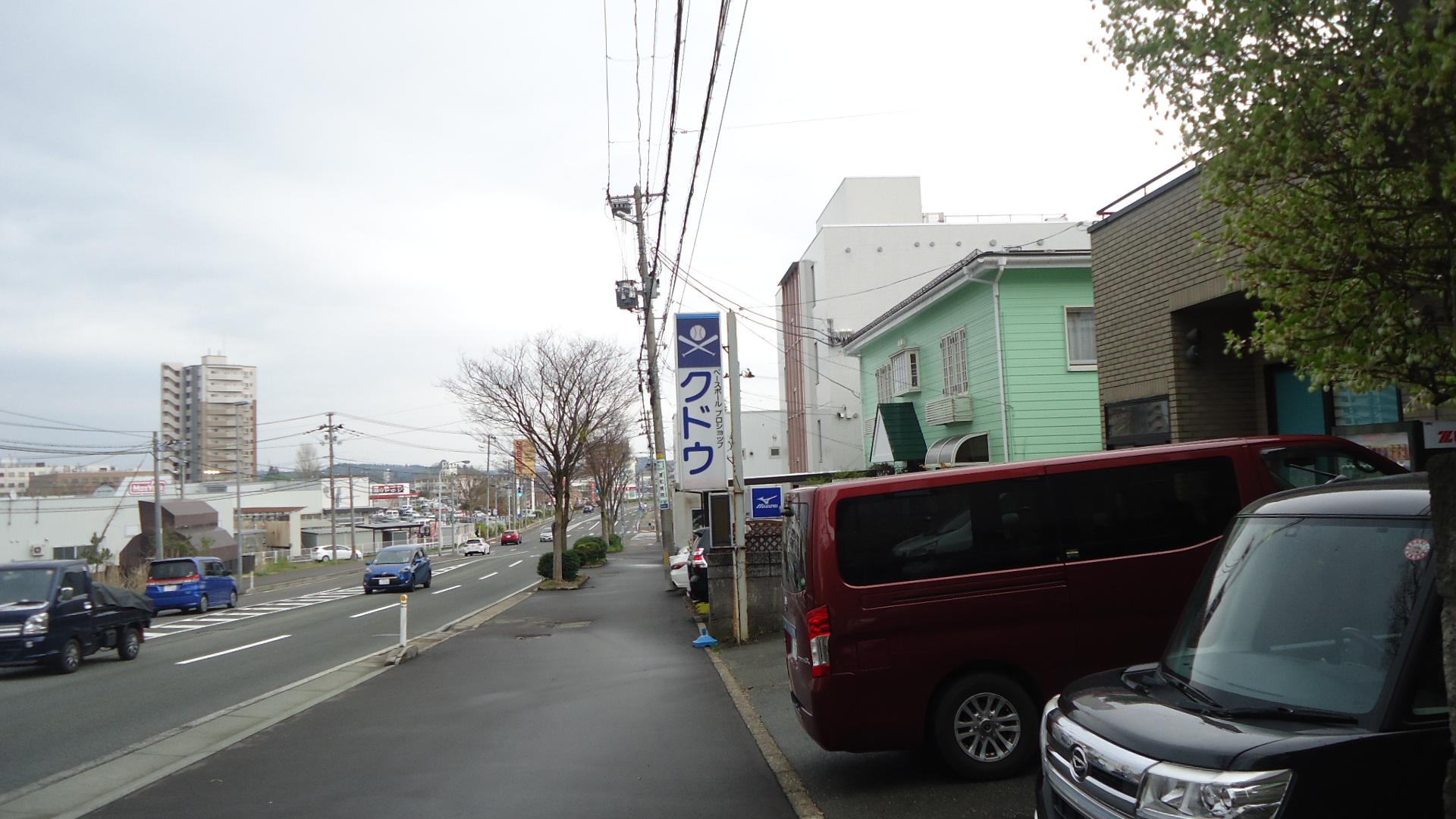
Kudo Sports Sign

== Death ==
Kudo died of liver failure in Akita, Akita on May 13, 2016, at the age of 55.
