= Daisuke Yamashita =

Japanese baseball player (born 1952)

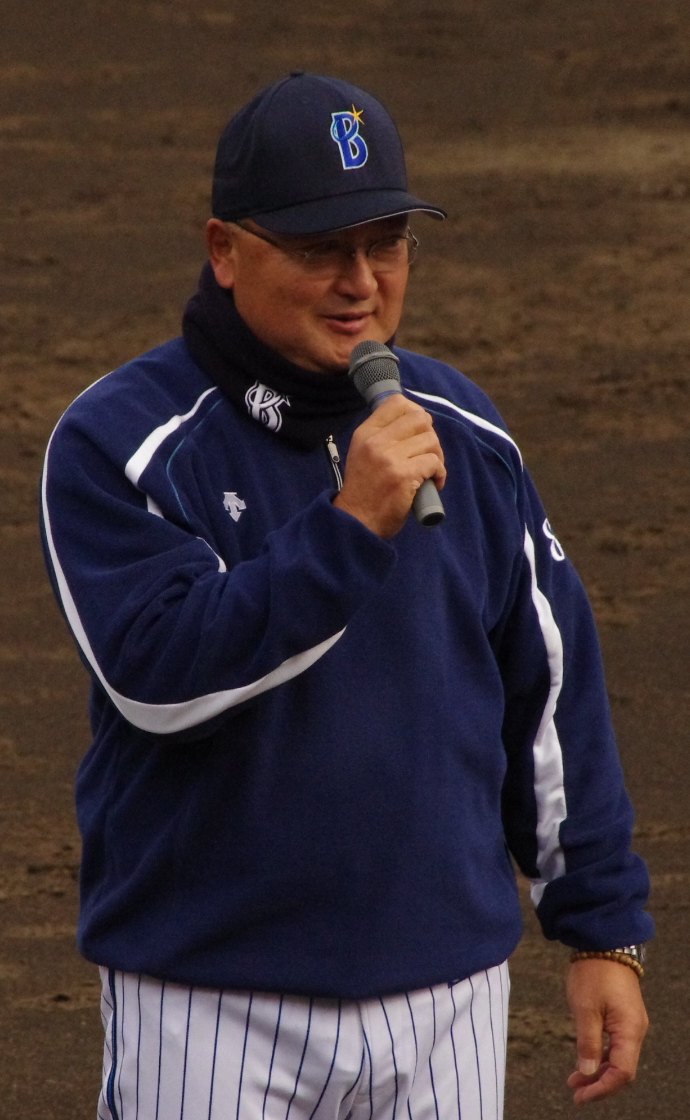
- Infielder / Coach
- Born: March 5, 1952 (age 74); Shizuoka Prefecture, Japan
- Batted: Right Threw: Right

NPB debut
- April 7, 1974, for the Taiyō Whales

Last NPB appearance
- October 22, 1987, for the Yokohama Taiyō Whales

Career statistics
- Batting average: .262
- Home runs: 129
- Hits: 1378
- Stats at Baseball Reference

Teams
- As player: Taiyō Whales/Yokohama Taiyō Whales (1974–1988); As manager: Yokohama BayStars (2003–2004); As coach: Yokohama BayStars/Yokohama DeNA BayStars (1993–2000, 2012–2013, 2015); Tohoku Rakuten Golden Eagles (2005)

Career highlights and awards
- 1× Best Nine Award (1981); 8× Diamond Glove Award (1976–1983); 4× NPB All-Star (1974–1975, 1978, 1981)

Daisuke Yamashita (山下 大輔, Yamashita Daisuke; born March 5, 1952) was a Japanese Nippon Professional Baseball player. He attended Keio University, and played shortstop position on Japan's team in the Japan-U.S. College Baseball Championship Series in 1973.
