= Katsuya Kakunaka =

Japanese baseball player (born 1987)

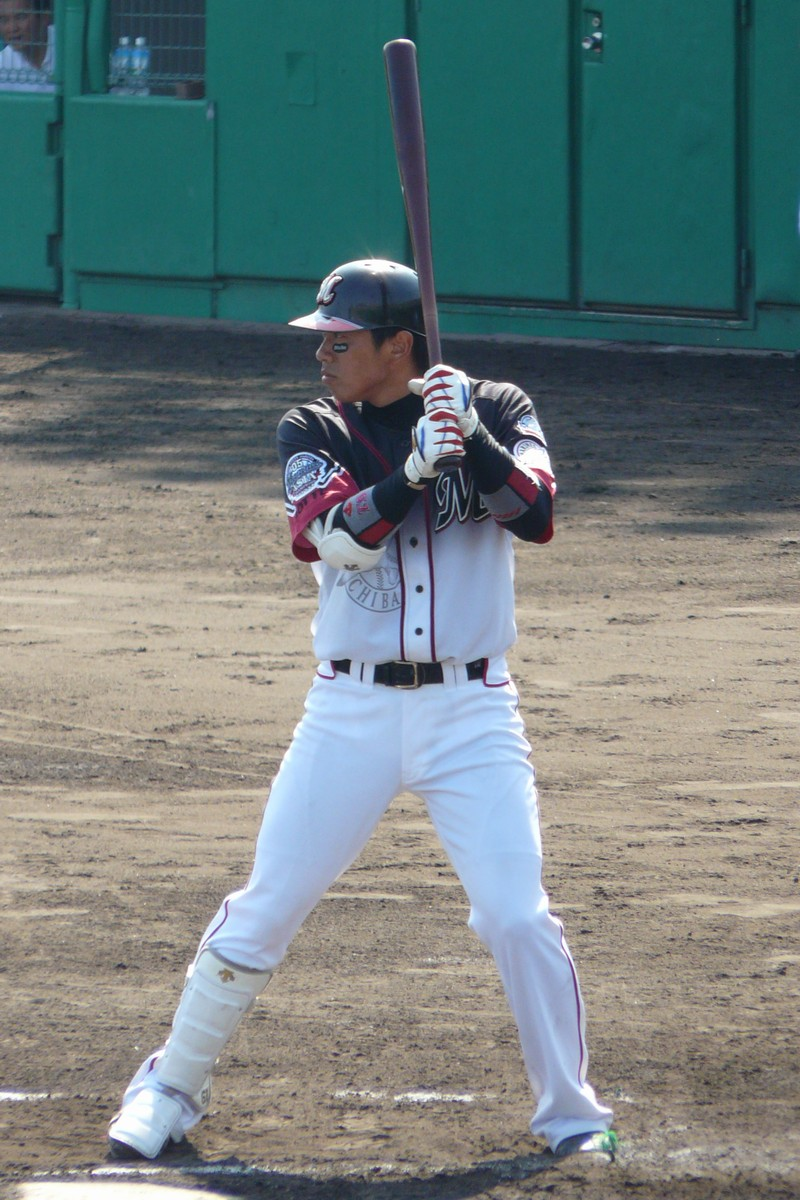
- Kakunaka with the Chiba Lotte Marines

Chiba Lotte Marines – No. 3
- Outfielder
- Born: May 25, 1987 (age 39)
- Bats: Left Throws: Right

NPB debut
- July 24, 2007, for the Chiba Lotte Marines

NPB statistics (through 2024 season)
- Batting average: .281
- Hits: 1,337
- Home runs: 69
- Runs batted in: 559
- Stats at Baseball Reference

Teams
- Chiba Lotte Marines (2007–2026)

Career highlights and awards
- 3× NPB All-Star (2012, 2015, 2016); 2× Best Nine Award (2012, 2016); 2× PL Batting Champion (2012, 2016); Japan Series Champion (2010)

Katsuya Kakunaka (角中 勝也, born May 25, 1987) is a Japanese professional baseball outfielder for the Chiba Lotte Marines in Japan's Nippon Professional Baseball.
