= Akihiro Higashide =

Japanese baseball player and coach (born 1980)

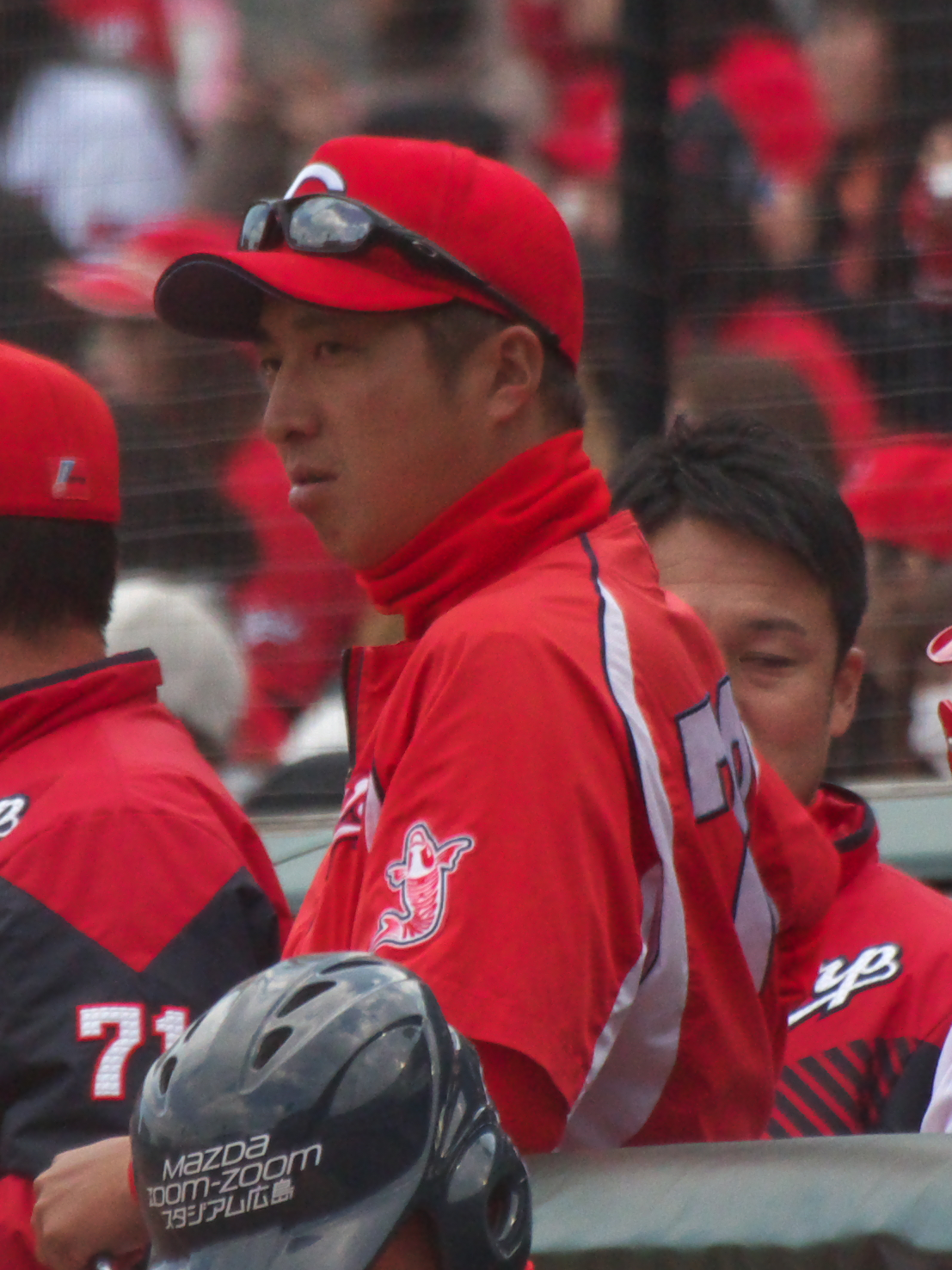
- Higashide with the Hiroshima Toyo Carp

Hiroshima Toyo Carp – No. 72
- Infielder / Coach
- Born: August 21, 1980 (age 45); Fukui, Japan
- Batted: Left Threw: Right

NPB debut
- May 11, 1999, for the Hiroshima Toyo Carp

Last NPB appearance
- October 6, 2012, for the Hiroshima Toyo Carp

NPB statistics
- Batting average: .268
- Hits: 1,366
- Home runs: 12
- RBIs: 262
- Stolen Bases: 143

Teams
- As player: Hiroshima Toyo Carp (1999–2015); As coach: Hiroshima Toyo Carp (2015–present)

Career highlights and awards
- 2× Best Nine Award (2008, 2009); 4× NPB All-Star (2006, 2008–2010)

Akihiro Higashide (東出 輝裕, Higashide Akihiro; born August 21, 1980) is a Nippon Professional Baseball player for the Hiroshima Toyo Carp in Japan's Central League.
