= Yutaka Ohashi =

Japanese-American artist (1923–1989)

- Born: August 19, 1923; Hiroshima, Japan
- Died: July 4, 1989 (aged 65)
- Education: Tokyo University of the Arts; School of the Museum of Fine Arts, Boston
- Known for: Visual Art
- Movement: Abstract Expressionism, Abstract art
- Awards: "Salon de Printemps" of Tokyo Award 1950, William Paige Traveling Scholarship, Museum of Fine Art, Boston, 1955–57, creative painting in Europe John Simon Guggenheim Fellowship, 1959–1960, creative painting in Japan.

Yutaka Ohashi (August 19, 1923 – July 4, 1989) was a Japanese American artist.

He studied at Tokyo University of the Arts for 3 years, under the painter Gen’ichirō Inokuma. He later went to the School of the Museum of Fine Arts, Boston.

== Art ==
Ohashi's style is broadly included in the Abstract Expressionism movement, combined with the aesthetics of traditional Japanese art. His work, Stone garden which appears in the Guggenheim currently (2019), draws upon the idea of the Japanese rock garden.

His techniques are identified by the Guggenheim: "Ohashi was known for paintings that integrated the restrained, purposeful act of collage, adding texture and changing registers of density to large, encompassing abstract forms. He added semitransparent layers of rice paper to the foreground of his paintings and, at times, partly obscured the rice paper with layers of oil paint. This technique, combined with large swaths of negative space and occasional highlights in gold leaf, contributes to fluctuating perceptions of space within Ohashi’s compositions".
