= Yuhei Takai =

Japanese baseball player

Yuhei Takai 雄平
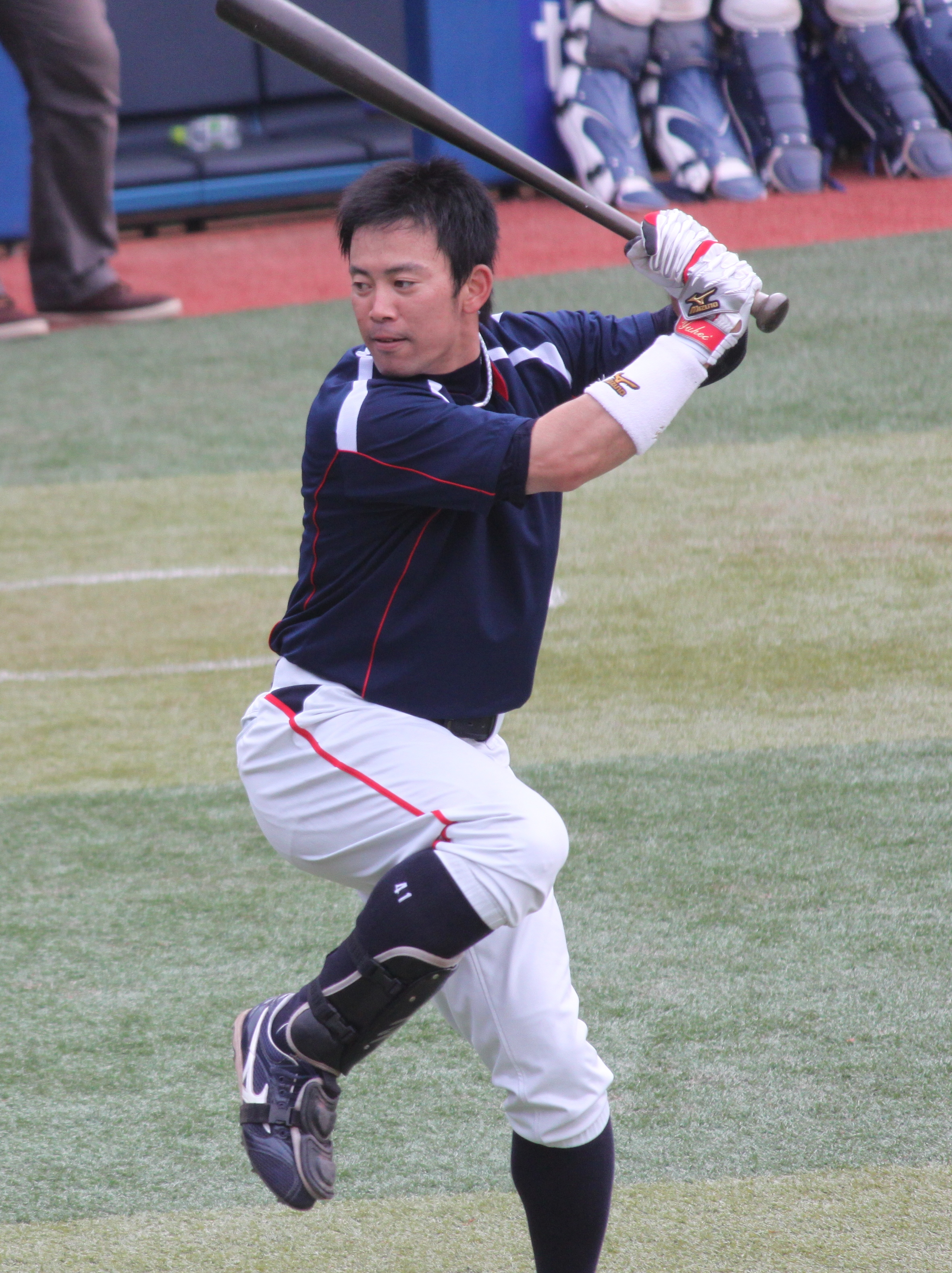

Tohoku Rakuten Golden Eagles – No. 84
- Pitcher / Outfielder / Coach
- Born: June 25, 1984 (age 41); Kawasaki, Kanagawa, Japan
- Batted: Left Threw: Left

NPB debut
- April 22, 2003, for the Yakult Swallows

Last NPB appearance
- November 1, 2021, for the Tokyo Yakult Swallows

Career statistics
- Batting average: .291
- Runs batted in: 386
- Home runs: 66
- Stats at Baseball Reference

Teams
- As player: Yakult Swallows/Tokyo Yakult Swallows (2003–2021); As coach: Tohoku Rakuten Golden Eagles (2022–present)

Career highlights and awards
- 1× Best Nine Award (2014); 2× NPB All-Star (2014–2015)

Yuhei Takai (高井 雄平, Takai Yūhei; born June 25, 1984 in Kawasaki, Kanagawa, Japan) is a Japanese former professional baseball player. Yuhei played a total of 18 years for the Tokyo Yakult Swallows. He began his career as a pitcher, and later converted to an outfielder following the 2009 season and changed his registered name. Starting with the 2022 season, he will be a hitting coach with the Tohoku Rakuten Golden Eagles.

== Career ==
Takai began his career in 2003 with the Yakult Swallows, making his NPB debut on April 22, 2003. From 2011 to 2021, he register name changed as Yuhei (雄平, Yūhei) and changed from pitcher to outfielder. On September 28, 2021, Yuhei announced he would be retiring from professional baseball following the 2021 season after 18 years.
