= Hidenori Tanoue =

Japanese baseball player (born 1980)

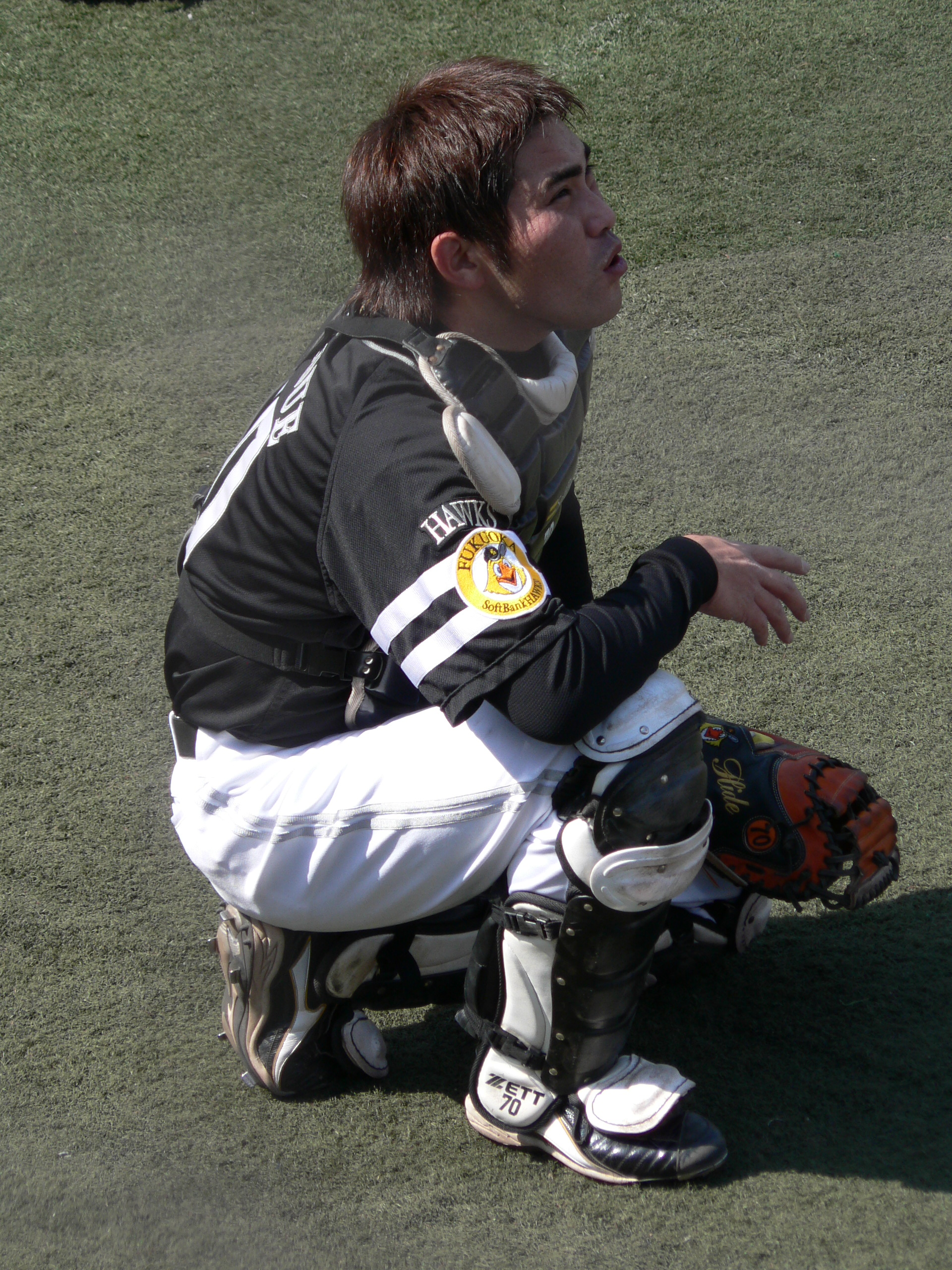
- Catcher
- Born: March 20, 1980 (age 46); Suminoe-ku, Osaka, Japan
- Batted: Right Threw: Right

NPB debut
- 2002, for the Chunichi Dragons

Last NPB appearance
- August 30, 2013

NPB statistics
- Batting average: .247
- Home runs: 50
- RBI: 184
- Stats at Baseball Reference

Teams
- Chunichi Dragons (2002–2004); Fukuoka SoftBank Hawks (2006–2013)

Hidenori Tanoue (田上 秀則, born March 20, 1980) is a Japanese former professional baseball catcher. He played in Nippon Professional Baseball (NPB) for the Chunichi Dragons from 2002 to 2004 and Fukuoka SoftBank Hawks from 2006 to 2013.
