= Hideshi Miyake =

Japanese baseball player (1934–2021)

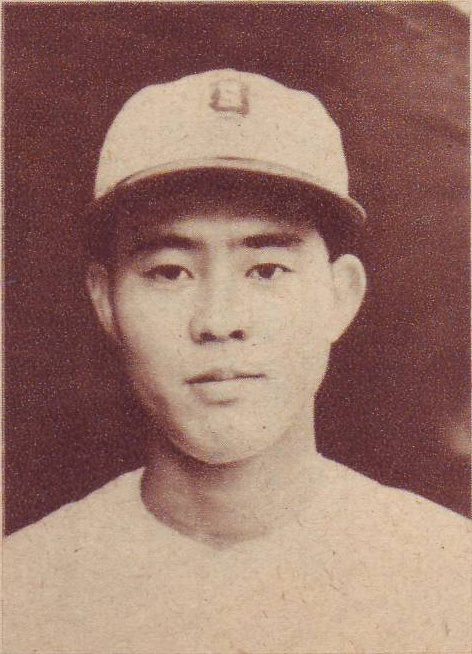
- Hideshi Miyake in 1955
- Third baseman/Second baseman
- Born: April 5, 1934; Kojima, Okayama, Japan
- Died: March 3, 2021 (aged 86)
- Batted: Right Threw: Right

Teams
- Osaka/Hanshin Tigers (1953–1967)

Hideshi Miyake (三宅 秀史, Miyake Hideshi; April 5, 1934 – March 3, 2021) was a Japanese Nippon Professional Baseball third baseman and second baseman. He played for the Osaka/Hanshin Tigers from 1953 to 1967.
