= Yasuhiro Takai =

Japanese baseball player (1945–2019)

- First baseman/designated hitter
- Born: 1 February 1945; Imabari, Ehime, Japan
- Died: 13 December 2019 (aged 74); Nishinomiya, Japan
- Batted: Right Threw: Right

NPB debut
- 8 June, 1966, for the Hankyu Braves

Last appearance
- 3 October, 1982, for the Hankyu Braves

NPB statistics
- Batting average: .269
- Home runs: 130
- Runs batted in: 446
- Stats at Baseball Reference

Teams
- Hankyu Braves (1966–1982)

Career highlights and awards
- NPB record 27 career pinch-hit home runs

Yasuhiro Takai (高井 保弘, Takai Yasuhiro; 1 February 1945 – 13 December 2019) was a Japanese professional baseball first baseman and designated hitter in Nippon Professional Baseball for the Hankyu Braves.

Takai was born on 1 February 1945 in Imabari, Ehime. He attended Ehime Prefectural Imabari West High School and played for the Nagoya Nissan Motor Company baseball team before signing with the Hankyu Braves in 1964. Takai was originally signed to the practice squad and made his Nippon Professional Baseball debut in 1966. Over the course of his career, Takai became known for his extensive research into opposing pitchers. He set the NPB record for pinch-hit home runs, with 27. After he retired in 1982, Takai served as a broadcaster.

Takai died of kidney failure on 13 December 2019, at a hospital in Nishinomiya, aged 74.
