= 1962 Nippon Professional Baseball season =

1962 NPB season
- League: Nippon Professional Baseball
- Sport: Baseball

Central League pennant
- League champions: Hanshin Tigers
- Runners-up: Taiyo Whales
- Season MVP: Minoru Murayama (HAN)

Pacific League pennant
- League champions: Toei Flyers
- Runners-up: Nankai Hawks
- Season MVP: Isao Harimoto (TOE)

Japan Series
- Champions: Toei Flyers
- Runners-up: Hanshin Tigers
- Finals MVP: Masayuki Dobashi (TOE); Masayuki Tanemo (TOE)

NPB seasons
- ← 1961 1963 →

The 1962 Nippon Professional Baseball season was the thirteenth season of operation of Nippon Professional Baseball (NPB).

== Regular season ==
=== Standings ===
Central League regular season standings
| Team | G | W | L | T | Pct. | GB |
|---|---|---|---|---|---|---|
| Hanshin Tigers | 133 | 75 | 55 | 3 | .577 | — |
| Taiyo Whales | 134 | 71 | 59 | 4 | .546 | 4.0 |
| Chunichi Dragons | 133 | 70 | 60 | 3 | .538 | 5.0 |
| Yomiuri Giants | 134 | 67 | 63 | 4 | .515 | 8.0 |
| Hiroshima Carp | 134 | 56 | 74 | 4 | .431 | 19.0 |
| Kokutetsu Swallows | 134 | 51 | 79 | 4 | .392 | 24.0 |

Pacific League regular season standings
| Team | G | W | L | T | Pct. | GB |
|---|---|---|---|---|---|---|
| Toei Flyers | 133 | 78 | 52 | 3 | .600 | — |
| Nankai Hawks | 133 | 73 | 57 | 3 | .562 | 5.0 |
| Nishitetsu Lions | 136 | 62 | 68 | 6 | .477 | 16.0 |
| Daimai Orions | 132 | 60 | 70 | 2 | .462 | 18.0 |
| Hankyu Braves | 131 | 60 | 70 | 1 | .462 | 18.0 |
| Kintetsu Buffaloes | 131 | 57 | 73 | 1 | .438 | 21.0 |

== Postseason ==
=== Japan Series ===
PL Toei Flyers (4) vs. CL Hanshin Tigers (2)

| Game | Date | Score | Location | Time | Attendance |
|---|---|---|---|---|---|
| 1 | October 13 | Toei Flyers – 5, Hanshin Tigers – 6 | Koshien Stadium | 3:08 | 35,692 |
| 2 | October 14 | Toei Flyers – 0, Hanshin Tigers – 5 | Koshien Stadium | 2:08 | 35,995 |
| 3 | October 16 | Hanshin Tigers – 2, Toei Flyers – 2 | Meiji Jingu Stadium | 3:44 | 38,733 |
| 4 | October 17 | Hanshin Tigers – 1, Toei Flyers – 3 | Meiji Jingu Stadium | 2:25 | 37,741 |
| 5 | October 18 | Hanshin Tigers – 1, Toei Flyers – 3 | Korakuen Stadium | 2:43 | 30,187 |
| 6 | October 20 | Toei Flyers – 7, Hanshin Tigers – 4 | Koshien Stadium | 2:34 | 21,214 |
| 7 | October 21 | Toei Flyers – 2, Hanshin Tigers – 1 | Koshien Stadium | 3:19 | 29,192 |

== League leaders ==
=== Central League ===
Batting leaders
| Stat | Player | Team | Total |
|---|---|---|---|
| Batting average | Katsuji Morinaga | Hiroshima Carp | .307 |
| Home runs | Sadaharu Oh | Yomiuri Giants | 38 |
| Runs batted in | Sadaharu Oh | Yomiuri Giants | 85 |
| Runs | Sadaharu Oh | Yomiuri Giants | 79 |
| Hits | Shigeo Nagashima | Yomiuri Giants | 151 |
| Stolen bases | Akiteru Kono | Chunichi Dragons | 35 |

Pitching leaders
| Stat | Player | Team | Total |
|---|---|---|---|
| Wins | Hiroshi Gondo | Chunichi Dragons | 30 |
| Losses | Kiyoshi Oishi | Hiroshima Carp | 18 |
| Earned run average | Minoru Murayama | Hanshin Tigers | 1.20 |
| Strikeouts | Masaaki Koyama | Hanshin Tigers | 270 |
| Innings pitched | Minoru Murayama | Hanshin Tigers | 366 1/3 |

=== Pacific League ===
Batting leaders
| Stat | Player | Team | Total |
|---|---|---|---|
| Batting average | Jack Bloomfield | Kintetsu Buffaloes | .374 |
| Home runs | Katsuya Nomura | Nankai Hawks | 44 |
| Runs batted in | Katsuya Nomura | Nankai Hawks | 104 |
| Runs | Yoshinori Hirose | Nankai Hawks | 99 |
| Hits | Kihachi Enomoto | Daimai Orions | 160 |
| Stolen bases | Yoshinori Hirose | Nankai Hawks | 50 |

Pitching leaders
| Stat | Player | Team | Total |
|---|---|---|---|
| Wins | Masahiro Kubo | Kintetsu Buffaloes | 28 |
| Losses | Tsutomu Kuroda | Kintetsu Buffaloes | 23 |
| Earned run average | Osamu Kubota | Toei Flyers | 2.12 |
| Strikeouts | Tetsuya Yoneda | Hankyu Braves | 231 |
| Innings pitched | Kazuhisa Inao | Nishitetsu Lions | 320 2/3 |

== Awards ==
- Most Valuable Player
  - Minoru Murayama, Hanshin Tigers (CL)
  - Isao Harimoto, Toei Flyers (PL)
- Rookie of the Year
  - Kunio Jonouchi, Yomiuri Giants (CL)
  - Yukio Ozaki, Toei Flyers (PL)
- Eiji Sawamura Award
  - Masaaki Koyama, Hanshin Tigers (CL)

Central League Best Nine Award winners
| Position | Player | Team |
|---|---|---|
| Pitcher | Minoru Murayama | Hanshin Tigers |
| Catcher | Masahiko Mori | Yomiuri Giants |
| First baseman | Sadaharu Oh | Yomiuri Giants |
| Second baseman | Yoshitaka Kosaka | Hiroshima Carp |
| Third baseman | Shigeo Nagashima | Yomiuri Giants |
| Shortstop | Yoshio Yoshida | Hanshin Tigers |
| Outfielder | Kazuhiko Kondo | Taiyo Whales |
| Outfielder | Teruo Namiki | Hanshin Tigers |
| Outfielder | Katsuji Morinaga | Hiroshima Carp |

Pacific League Best Nine Award winners
| Position | Player | Team |
|---|---|---|
| Pitcher | Kazuhisa Inao | Nishitetsu Lions |
| Catcher | Katsuya Nomura | Nankai Hawks |
| First baseman | Kihachi Enomoto | Daimai Orions |
| Second baseman | Jack Bloomfield | Kintetsu Buffaloes |
| Third baseman | Akitoshi Kodama | Kintetsu Buffaloes |
| Shortstop | Yasumitsu Toyoda | Nishitetsu Lions |
| Outfielder | Isao Harimoto | Toei Flyers |
| Outfielder | Kazuhiro Yamauchi | Daimai Orions |
| Outfielder | Katsutoyo Yoshida | Toei Flyers |

== See also ==
- 1962 Major League Baseball season
