= 1963 Nippon Professional Baseball season =

1963 NPB season
- League: Nippon Professional Baseball
- Sport: Baseball

Central League pennant
- League champions: Yomiuri Giants
- Runners-up: Chunichi Dragons
- Season MVP: Shigeo Nagashima (YOM)

Pacific League pennant
- League champions: Nishitetsu Lions
- Runners-up: Nankai Hawks
- Season MVP: Katsuya Nomura (NAN)

Japan Series
- Champions: Yomiuri Giants
- Runners-up: Nishitetsu Lions
- Finals MVP: Shigeo Nagashima (YOM)

NPB seasons
- ← 1962 1964 →

The 1963 Nippon Professional Baseball season was the fourteenth season of operation of Nippon Professional Baseball (NPB).

== Regular season ==
=== Standings ===
Central League regular season standings
Team	G	W	L	T	Pct.	GB
Yomiuri Giants	140	83	55	2	.601	—
Chunichi Dragons	140	80	57	3	.584	2.5
Hanshin Tigers	140	69	70	1	.496	14.5
Kokutetsu Swallows	140	65	73	2	.471	18.0
Taiyo Whales	140	59	79	2	.428	24.0
Hiroshima Carp	140	58	80	2	.420	25.0

Pacific League regular season standings
Team	G	W	L	T	Pct.	GB
Nishitetsu Lions	150	86	60	4	.589	—
Nankai Hawks	150	85	61	4	.582	1.0
Toei Flyers	150	76	71	3	.517	10.5
Kintetsu Buffaloes	150	74	73	3	.503	12.5
Daimai Orions	150	64	85	1	.430	23.5
Hankyu Braves	150	57	92	1	.383	30.5

== Postseason ==
=== Japan Series ===
CL Yomiuri Giants (4) vs. PL Nishitetsu Lions (3)

Game	Date	Score	Location	Time	Attendance
1	October 26	Yomiuri Giants – 1, Nishitetsu Lions – 6	Heiwadai Stadium	2:29	29,806
2	October 27	Yomiuri Giants – 9, Nishitetsu Lions – 6	Heiwadai Stadium	2:54	29,969
3	October 30	Nishitetsu Lions – 2, Yomiuri Giants – 8	Korakuen Stadium	2:28	30,384
4	October 31	Nishitetsu Lions – 4, Yomiuri Giants – 1	Korakuen Stadium	2:42	29,960
5	November 1	Nishitetsu Lions – 1, Yomiuri Giants – 3	Korakuen Stadium	2:10	30,386
6	November 3	Yomiuri Giants – 0, Nishitetsu Lions – 6	Heiwadai Stadium	2:09	27,079
7	November 4	Yomiuri Giants – 18, Nishitetsu Lions – 4	Heiwadai Stadium	2:32	17,436

== League leaders ==
=== Central League ===
Batting leaders
Stat	Player	Team	Total
Batting average	Shigeo Nagashima	Yomiuri Giants	.341
Home runs	Sadaharu Oh	Yomiuri Giants	40
Runs batted in	Shigeo Nagashima	Yomiuri Giants	112
Runs	Sadaharu Oh	Yomiuri Giants	111
Hits	Shigeo Nagashima	Yomiuri Giants	163
Stolen bases	Morimichi Takagi	Chunichi Dragons	50

Pitching leaders
Stat	Player	Team	Total
Wins	Masaichi Kaneda	Kokutetsu Swallows	30
Losses	Kiyoshi Oishi	Hiroshima Carp	22
Earned run average	Minoru Kakimoto	Chunichi Dragons	1.70
Strikeouts	Masaichi Kaneda	Kokutetsu Swallows	287
Innings pitched	Makoto Inagawa	Taiyo Whales	338 1/3

=== Pacific League ===
Batting leaders
Stat	Player	Team	Total
Batting average	Jack Bloomfield	Kintetsu Buffaloes	.335
Home runs	Katsuya Nomura	Nankai Hawks	52
Runs batted in	Katsuya Nomura	Nankai Hawks	135
Runs	Katsuya Nomura	Nankai Hawks	104
Hits	Yoshinori Hirose	Nankai Hawks	187
Stolen bases	Yoshinori Hirose	Nankai Hawks	45

Pitching leaders
Stat	Player	Team	Total
Wins	Kazuhisa Inao	Nishitetsu Lions	28
Losses	Tetsuya Yoneda	Hankyu Braves	23
Earned run average	Masahiro Kubo	Kintetsu Buffaloes	2.36
Strikeouts	Kazuhisa Inao	Nishitetsu Lions	226
Innings pitched	Kazuhisa Inao	Nishitetsu Lions	386

== Awards ==
- Most Valuable Player
  - Shigeo Nagashima, Yomiuri Giants (CL)
  - Katsuya Nomura, Nankai Hawks (PL)
- Rookie of the Year
  - No CL recipient
  - No PL recipient
- Eiji Sawamura Award
  - Yoshiaki Ito, Yomiuri Giants (CL)

Central League Best Nine Award winners
Position	Player	Team
Pitcher	Masaichi Kaneda	Kokutetsu Swallows
Catcher	Masahiko Mori	Yomiuri Giants
First baseman	Sadaharu Oh	Yomiuri Giants
Second baseman	Morimichi Takagi	Chunichi Dragons
Third baseman	Shigeo Nagashima	Yomiuri Giants
Shortstop	Takeshi Koba	Hiroshima Carp
Outfielder	Kazuhiko Kondo	Taiyo Whales
Outfielder	Shinichi Eto	Chunichi Dragons
Outfielder	Eiji Fujii	Hanshin Tigers

Pacific League Best Nine Award winners
Position	Player	Team
Pitcher	Kazuhisa Inao	Nishitetsu Lions
Catcher	Katsuya Nomura	Nankai Hawks
First baseman	Kihachi Enomoto	Daimai Orions
Second baseman	Jack Bloomfield	Kintetsu Buffaloes
Third baseman	Akitoshi Kodama	Kintetsu Buffaloes
Shortstop	Kenji Koike	Nankai Hawks
Outfielder	Isao Harimoto	Toei Flyers
Outfielder	Kazuhiro Yamauchi	Daimai Orions
Outfielder	Yoshinori Hirose	Nankai Hawks

== See also ==
- 1963 Major League Baseball season
