= 1961 Nippon Professional Baseball season =

1961 NPB season
- League: Nippon Professional Baseball
- Sport: Baseball

Central League pennant
- League champions: Yomiuri Giants
- Runners-up: Chunichi Dragons
- Season MVP: Shigeo Nagashima (YOM)

Pacific League pennant
- League champions: Nankai Hawks
- Runners-up: Toei Flyers
- Season MVP: Katsuya Nomura (NAN)

Japan Series
- Champions: Yomiuri Giants
- Runners-up: Nankai Hawks
- Finals MVP: Andy Miyamoto (YOM)

NPB seasons
- ← 1960 1962 →

The 1961 Nippon Professional Baseball season was the twelfth season of operation of Nippon Professional Baseball (NPB).

== Regular season ==
=== Standings ===
Central League regular season standings
Team	G	W	L	T	Pct.	GB
Yomiuri Giants	130	71	53	6	.569	—
Chunichi Dragons	130	72	56	2	.562	1.0
Kokutetsu Swallows	130	67	60	3	.527	5.5
Hanshin Tigers	130	60	67	3	.473	12.5
Hiroshima Carp	130	58	67	5	.465	13.5
Taiyo Whales	130	50	75	5	.404	21.5

Pacific League regular season standings
Team	G	W	L	T	Pct.	GB
Nankai Hawks	140	85	49	6	.629	—
Toei Flyers	140	83	52	5	.611	2.5
Nishitetsu Lions	140	81	56	3	.589	5.5
Daimai Orions	140	72	66	2	.521	15.0
Hankyu Braves	140	53	84	3	.389	33.5
Kintetsu Buffaloes	140	36	103	1	.261	51.5

== Postseason ==
=== Japan Series ===
CL Yomiuri Giants (4) vs. PL Nankai Hawks (2)

Game	Date	Score	Location	Time	Attendance
1	October 22	Yomiuri Giants – 0, Nankai Hawks – 6	Osaka Stadium	2:19	30,720
2	October 24	Yomiuri Giants – 6, Nankai Hawks – 4	Osaka Stadium	2:41	26,845
3	October 26	Nankai Hawks – 4, Yomiuri Giants – 5	Korakuen Stadium	2:23	30,878
4	October 29	Nankai Hawks – 3, Yomiuri Giants – 4	Korakuen Stadium	2:18	33,186
5	October 30	Nankai Hawks – 6, Yomiuri Giants – 3	Korakuen Stadium	2:28	30,135
6	November 1	Yomiuri Giants – 3, Nankai Hawks – 2	Osaka Stadium	2:45	21,565

== League leaders ==
=== Central League ===
Batting leaders
Stat	Player	Team	Total
Batting average	Shigeo Nagashima	Yomiuri Giants	.353
Home runs	Shigeo Nagashima	Yomiuri Giants	28
Runs batted in	Takeshi Kuwata	Taiyo Whales	94
Runs	Toshio Naka	Chunichi Dragons	88
Hits	Shigeo Nagashima	Yomiuri Giants	158
Stolen bases	Kazuhiko Kondo	Taiyo Whales	35

Pitching leaders
Stat	Player	Team	Total
Wins	Hiroshi Gondo	Chunichi Dragons	35
Losses	Masaaki Koyama	Hanshin Tigers	22
Earned run average	Hiroshi Gondo	Chunichi Dragons	1.70
Strikeouts	Hiroshi Gondo	Chunichi Dragons	310
Innings pitched	Hiroshi Gondo	Chunichi Dragons	429 1/3

=== Pacific League ===
Batting leaders
Stat	Player	Team	Total
Batting average	Isao Harimoto	Toei Flyers	.336
Home runs	Katsuya Nomura; Yoshihiro Nakata	Nankai Hawks; Hankyu Braves	29
Runs batted in	Kazuhiro Yamauchi	Daimai Orions	112
Runs	Akio Saionji	Toei Flyers	97
Hits	Kihachi Enomoto	Daimai Orions	180
Stolen bases	Yoshinori Hirose	Nankai Hawks	42

Pitching leaders
Stat	Player	Team	Total
Wins	Kazuhisa Inao	Nishitetsu Lions	42
Losses	Toshiaki Tokuhisa	Kintetsu Buffaloes	24
Earned run average	Kazuhisa Inao	Nishitetsu Lions	1.69
Strikeouts	Kazuhisa Inao	Nishitetsu Lions	353
Innings pitched	Kazuhisa Inao	Nishitetsu Lions	404

== Awards ==
- Most Valuable Player
  - Shigeo Nagashima, Yomiuri Giants (CL)
  - Katsuya Nomura, Nankai Hawks (PL)
- Rookie of the Year
  - Hiroshi Gondo, Chunichi Dragons (CL)
  - Toshiaki Tokuhisa, Kintetsu Buffaloes (PL)
- Eiji Sawamura Award
  - Hiroshi Gondo, Chunichi Dragons (CL)

Central League Best Nine Award winners
Position	Player	Team
Pitcher	Hiroshi Gondo	Chunichi Dragons
Catcher	Masahiko Mori	Yomiuri Giants
First baseman	Katsumi Fujimoto	Hanshin Tigers
Second baseman	Masataka Tsuchiya	Kokutetsu Swallows
Third baseman	Shigeo Nagashima	Yomiuri Giants
Shortstop	Akiteru Kono	Chunichi Dragons
Outfielder	Kazuhiko Kondo	Taiyo Whales
Outfielder	Shinichi Eto	Chunichi Dragons
Outfielder	Katsuji Morinaga	Hiroshima Carp

Pacific League Best Nine Award winners
Position	Player	Team
Pitcher	Kazuhisa Inao	Nishitetsu Lions
Catcher	Katsuya Nomura	Nankai Hawks
First baseman	Kihachi Enomoto	Daimai Orions
Second baseman	Nobuyasu Morishita	Nankai Hawks
Third baseman	Futoshi Nakanishi	Nishitetsu Lions
Shortstop	Yasumitsu Toyoda	Nishitetsu Lions
Outfielder	Kazuhiro Yamauchi	Daimai Orions
Outfielder	Kenjiro Tamiya	Daimai Orions
Outfielder	Isao Harimoto	Toei Flyers

== See also ==
- 1961 Major League Baseball season
