= Meikyukai =

Baseball hall of fame in Japan

- 日本プロ野球名球会
- Established: July 24, 1978; 48 years ago
- Location: Kyōbashi, Chūō, Tokyo, Japan
- Type: Professional sports hall of fame
- Founder: Masaichi Kaneda
- Website: meikyukai.jp

The Meikyukai (日本プロ野球名球会, Nippon Puro Yakyū Meikyūkai; The Golden Players Club) is one of the two baseball halls of fame in Japan, the other being the Japanese Baseball Hall of Fame (野球殿堂, Yakyū Dendō). The Meikyukai is a limited company for public benefit.

Founded by Hall of Fame pitcher Masaichi Kaneda in 1978, the Meikyukai honors players born after 1926 (the beginning of the Shōwa period). Players are automatically inducted if they reach a career total of 2,000 hits or 200 wins in the Japanese professional leagues. Since 2003, players recording 250 saves are also inducted, with records from Major League Baseball (MLB) also being recognized. Since 2019, players who did not reach any of the above three figures, but who were deemed to have equivalent career achievements, could be inducted upon committee nomination and a vote of 75% or more current members.

Inductees are awarded a special jacket and participate in various baseball-related events during the off-season. Meikyukai members mostly make appearances in charity and volunteer events. The organization holds annual meetings and a golf tournament, which is often broadcast on television. All of the money raised from the golf tournament is donated to the Red Cross.

== History ==
Masaichi Kaneda founded Meikyukai on July 24, 1978. In addition to Kaneda, the founding members of the club were Kazuhisa Inao, Masaaki Koyama, Keishi Suzuki, Tetsuya Yoneda, Shinichi Etoh, Sadaharu Oh, Morimichi Takagi, Masahiro Doi, Shigeo Nagashima, Katsuya Nomura, Isao Harimoto, Yoshinori Hirose, Kazuhiro Yamauchi, Takao Kajimoto, Mutsuo Minagawa and Minoru Murayama.

In 2008, founder Masaichi Kaneda passed on club leadership to home run champion Sadaharu Oh after running it for more than 30 years. Kaneda later quit the club when it re-formed as a limited company in 2010.

As of September 2026, Atsuya Furuta is the current chairperson of the club.

The most recent inductees are Raidel Martinez and Naoya Masuda, who both reached the 250 save threshold on September 10, 2026, and August 4, 2026, respectively.

== Qualifications for inclusion ==
The founding members of the club limited membership to players born after 1926, partly because they only wanted members that had begun their career after the two-league system of Japanese baseball was established in 1950 (when the Japanese Baseball League reorganized into Nippon Professional Baseball), but mostly because Kaneda did not want to include qualified members, such as Tetsuharu Kawakami, that were older than he was. Originally, only players born in the Shōwa period (1926–1988) can join, the rule was changed in 2012, allowing post-Shōwa born players to be inducted in the near future.

Records in Major League Baseball (MLB) are also valid in counting the numbers; However, Meikyukai only takes records from the point where the player started his NPB career (i.e.: records before debut in NPB don't count). For example, Alex Ramírez's 86 hits in MLB before his NPB career were excluded and he was not inducted until he recorded his 2,000th NPB hit on April 6, 2013.

Though other records such as home runs, stolen bases, and strikeouts are not officially included in the qualifications, they are taken into consideration if a player is few short of required hit/win/save(s). Yutaka Fukumoto was specially inducted when he reached 800 career stolen bases (he would later mark 2,000 career hits). Such inductions was formally codified in 2019, allowing players who are originally not eligible to be inducted. As committee considered 200 wins are too difficult to be achieved for modern era pitchers, and players having notable combined pitching(batting) records should get qualified as well.

Nationality is not officially regarded as a qualification, as two of the founding members (Sadaharu Oh and Isao Harimoto) did not have a Japanese Nationality when Meikyukai was founded. However, only three non-Japanese players (Alex Ramírez, Alfonso Soriano, and Raidel Martinez) so far has met the milestone since foundation, and only Ramírez and Martinez are recognized as qualified members. As stated below, the reason being that, despite Soriano reaching the 2000 hits (2,097 hits) needed, almost all of those hits were in his years in MLB, and that the 2000 hit requirement was, as stated above, had to be achieved in NPB.

== Members ==
=== Current Members ===
Active NPB/MLB players (as of the 2026 season) are indicated with an asterisk (*).

- Koji Akiyama
- Shinnosuke Abe
- Norichika Aoki
- Hiromasa Arai
- Takahiro Arai
- Masahiro Araki
- Michiyo Arito
- Hideto Asamura*
- Yu Darvish*
- Masahiro Doi
- Yutaka Enatsu
- Taira Fujita
- Yutaka Fukumoto
- Kosuke Fukudome
- Kazuya Fukuura
- Kyuji Fujikawa
- Atsuya Furuta
- Osamu Higashio
- Masaji Hiramatsu
- Yoshihisa Hirano*
- Tadahito Iguchi
- Atsunori Inaba
- Takuro Ishii
- Hitoki Iwase
- Tomoaki Kanemoto
- Hideji Katō
- Kazuhiro Kiyohara
- Hiroki Kokubo
- Norihiro Komada
- Kimiyasu Kudo
- Takumi Kuriyama*
- Hiroki Kuroda
- Tomonori Maeda
- Raidel Martinez*
- Makoto Matsubara
- Naoya Masuda*
- Hideki Matsui
- Kazuo Matsui
- Shinya Miyamoto
- Norihiro Nakamura
- Hideo Nomo
- Kenjiro Nomura
- Yohei Oshima*
- Michihiro Ogasawara
- Sadaharu Oh
- Alex Ramírez
- Hayato Sakamoto*
- Kazuhiro Sasaki
- Isao Shibata
- Ichiro Suzuki
- Keishi Suzuki
- Shingo Takatsu
- Masahiro Tanaka*
- Yukio Tanaka
- Motonobu Tanishige
- Kazuyoshi Tatsunami
- Takashi Toritani
- Seiichi Uchikawa
- Koji Uehara
- Kazuhiro Wada
- Tsutomu Wakamatsu
- Hisashi Yamada
- Koji Yamamoto
- Masahiro Yamamoto
- Hiroyuki Yamazaki
- Tetsuya Yoneda

=== Honored Members ===
Deceased players who died during their membership are considered as "Honored Members".

- Shinichi Etoh
- Isao Harimoto
- Yoshinori Hirose
- Kazuhisa Inao
- Hiromitsu Kadota
- Takao Kajimoto
- Sachio Kinugasa
- Manabu Kitabeppu
- Masaaki Koyama
- Mutsuo Minagawa
- Choji Murata
- Minoru Murayama
- Shigeo Nagashima
- Katsuya Nomura
- Yasunori Oshima
- Katsuo Osugi
- Morimichi Takagi
- Kazuhiro Yamauchi

=== Former Members and Non-Inductees ===
Masaichi Kaneda, Kenichi Yazawa, Tsuneo Horiuchi were once members of Meikyukai, but later quit due to their own reasons.

Hiromitsu Ochiai reached 2,000 hits in 1995, but declined membership because Kaneda and other members had repeatedly criticized him during his career.

First baseman Kihachi Enomoto (with 2,314 career hits) didn't decline membership, but never participated in any of the club's meetings or events before his death in 2012, and was not recognized as a formal member nor a honored member.

Left fielder and second baseman Alfonso Soriano (with 2,097 career hits) technically met the 2,000 hits requirement in 2013, but he was not recognized as a formal member. Many suggest his significantly low NPB career hit (only 2 out of 2,097) preventing him from being introduced.

== See also ==
- Baseball awards#Japan
