= Koji Yamamoto (baseball, born 1946) =

Japanese baseball player and manager

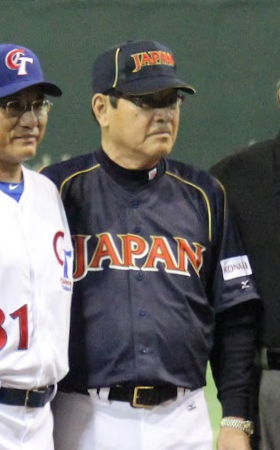
- Yamamoto as manager for the Japan national team in 2013 World Baseball Classic
- Center fielder / Manager
- Born: October 25, 1946 (age 79); Saeki, Hiroshima, Japan
- Batted: Right Threw: Right

NPB debut
- April 12, 1969, for the Hiroshima Toyo Carp

Last appearance
- 1986, for the Hiroshima Toyo Carp

NBP statistics
- Hits: 2,339
- Home runs: 536
- Base on balls: 1,168
- Runs batted in: 1,475
- Stolen Bases: 231
- Batting average: .290
- Slugging percentage: .5416

NBP All-Star Game statistics
- Batting average: .316
- Home runs: 14
- Runs batted in: 27
- Stats at Baseball Reference

Managerial statistics
- Wins: League Champion (1991)

Teams
- As player: Hiroshima Toyo Carp (1969–1986); As manager: Hiroshima Toyo Carp (1989–1993, 2001‍–‍2005); Japan national team (2013)

Career highlights and awards
- Regular season: 2x Central League MVP (1975, 1980); NPB Batting Champion (1975); 4x NPB Home Run Champion (1978, 1980, 1981, 1983); 3x NPB RBI Champion (1979–1981); 3x NPB On-bases Champion (1979, 1980, 1983); 10x NPB Best Nine Award (1975, 1977‍–‍1984, 1986); 10x NPB Golden Glove Award (1972–1981); 14x NPB All-Star Selections (1973–1986); 2x NPB All-Star Game MVP (1975, 1983); Hiroshima Toyo Carp #8 retired; Records: 5x Over 40 Home runs (1977–1981); 9x Over 30 Home runs (1975, 1977–1984); 6x Over 100 Runs batted in (1977–1981, 1983); 5-years consecutive seasons over 40 Home Runs (1977–1981); 8-years consecutive seasons over 30 Home Runs (1977–1984); 13-years consecutive seasons over 20 Home Runs (1974–1986); 5-years consecutive seasons over 100 Runs batted in (1977–1981); 17-years consecutive seasons over 100 Hits (1970–1986); Hitting for the cycle (April 30, 1983); 9-Consecutive Hits (July 6–8, 1972); 302-Consecutive Plays with No error (1975); 872-Consecutive Games (1976–1983); 11x Grand Slams (1972, 1977, 1978, 1980‍–‍1984)

Member of the Japanese

Baseball Hall of Fame
- Induction: 2008

Kōji Yamamoto (山本 浩二, Yamamoto Kōji; born October 25, 1946) is a Japanese former baseball player and manager of the Hiroshima Toyo Carp of Japan's Central League. A four-time home run king having played for Hiroshima Carp throughout his career, Yamamoto contributed to the team winning five league championships including its first-ever in 1975, and three titles of Japan Series in 1979, 1980 and 1984. He recorded over 40 home runs for five years in a row from 1977. With 536 home runs, he is fourth on the NPB career list. He is known as the Mr. Red Helmet (ミスター赤ヘル, Misutā Akaheru), nicknamed after Hiroshima Carp's symbolic red colored helmet.

Yamamoto managed Hiroshima Carp twice, between 1989 and 1993, and later between 2001 and 2005. He led the team to win Central League championship in 1991. He was inducted into the Japanese Baseball Hall of Fame in 2008, and is a member of the Meikyukai, or the "Golden Players Club."

== Career ==
After graduating from high school in Hiroshima, Yamamoto was admitted to Hosei University in 1965. Although he originally joined its baseball club as a pitcher, he was later converted to outfielder by the team manager who saw higher potential in Yamamoto at bat. Thus he came to be known as the "Hosei Trio", together with Kōichi Tabuchi and Masaru Tomita. Yamamoto was drafted first round by Hiroshima Carp in 1968. He began to exhibit his talent as an average and long range hitter in 1975, with which he contributed to the Carp mark its first league championship in its history, ending the season at .319 (leading hitter of the year) with 30 home runs. Starting 1977, he logged over 40 home runs for five consecutive years, which is in Japan a record paralleled only by Sadaharu Oh as of 2010. He was the home run leader of 1978, 1980, 1981 and 1983 seasons, and the RBI winner between 1979 and 1981. He was also awarded the Mitsui Golden Glove Award for ten consecutive years from 1972. Together with his number 8, Yamamoto retired from playing for the Carp in 1986, when the team won the league championship but lost Japan Series for the Seibu Lions.

== Managerial career ==
Spending several years as a baseball analyst for NHK, Yamamoto returned to Hiroshima Carp as its manager in 1989. He finished the first two years in second place, then took the team to win the Central League pennant in 1991. In 1993, however, he resigned from his post after delivering the team the last place in the league which it had not seen since 1974. He was asked to direct the Carp once again in 2001, although he never finished better than fourth place in the first year, then in fifth for the following three years, and finally in last place in 2005 when he left the squadron once again.

== See also ==
- List of top Nippon Professional Baseball home run hitters
- List of Nippon Professional Baseball players with 1,000 runs batted in
- List of Nippon Professional Baseball career hits leaders
