= Yōhei Ōshima =

Japanese baseball player (born 1985)

Yōhei Ōshima 大島洋平
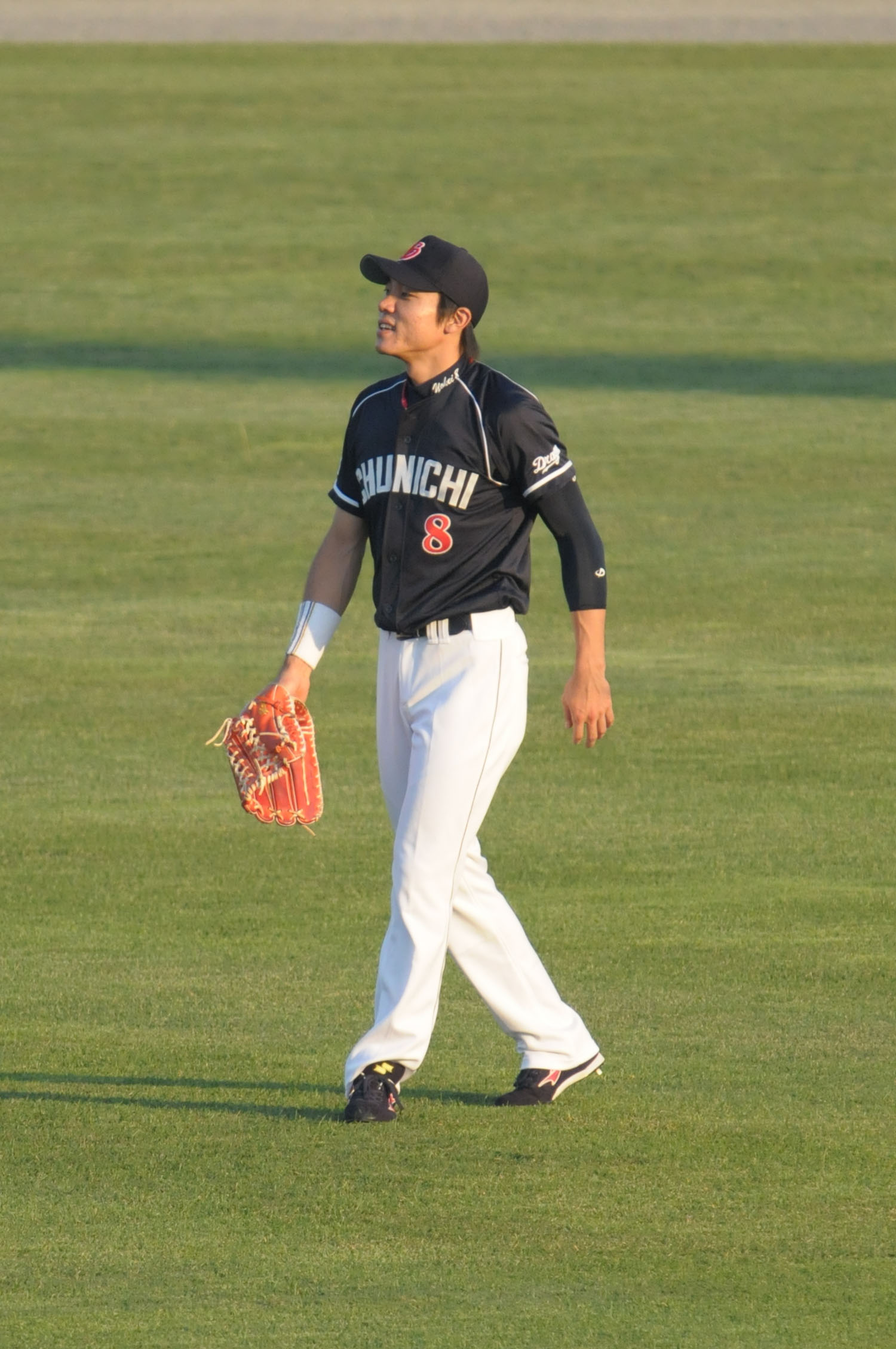
- Oshima with the Chunichi Dragons

Chunichi Dragons – No. 8
- Outfielder
- Born: November 9, 1985 (age 40)
- Bats: Left Throws: Left

NPB debut
- 2010, for the Chunichi Dragons

NPB statistics (through 2026)
- Batting average: .288
- Hits: 2,079
- Home runs: 34
- Runs batted in: 406
- Stolen bases: 272
- Stats at Baseball Reference

Teams
- Chunichi Dragons (2010–present)

Career highlights and awards
- 5× NPB All-Star (2012–2014, 2017, 2021); Central League stolen bases leader (2012); Japan Series Most Valuable Player (2010); Central League Best Nine Award (2012); 9× Central League Golden Glove Award (2011–2012, 2014–2016, 2018-2021); Meikyukai Member (on August 26, 2023)

Yōhei Ōshima (大島 洋平, born November 9, 1985) is a Japanese professional baseball outfielder for the Chunichi Dragons in Japan's Nippon Professional Baseball. Ōshima has 9 golden glove awards which is the most by any player in Chunichi Dragons history.

== Early career ==
In Grade 4, started playing baseball for the Nagoya Hirabari Junior Baseball club. From middle school, Ōshima played for Tōkai Challenger in the junior boys league as both pitcher and outfielder.

In high school of his third year, Oshima batted lead-off and pitched for Kyōei High School in the summer.

After entering Komazawa University. Oshima consolidated as an outfielder. In the Eastern University League of Tokyo, Oshima hit over .300 for 3 consecutive seasons from fall of 2006 including capturing batting title honours in fall of 2007 with a .395 average. Through his university career, Oshima played 83 games, hit .290 with 1 homerun and 20 RBIs. He was selected in the Best 9 twice.

After graduating university, Oshima joined Nihon Seimei in the industrial league. In his first year he was installed as lead-off hitter and in January 2008, batted .563 in the Japanese National Championships. He was selected in the industrial league Best 9 in the same year.

At the 2009 NPB draft Oshima was selected in the 5th round.

== Professional career ==
On July 20, 2016, he hit for the cycle in a game against the Hiroshima Carp at Mazda Zoom-Zoom Stadium Hiroshima, becoming the first to do so for Chunichi since Alex Ochoa in 2004. On August 26, 2023, he got his 2000th hit in a game against the Yokohama DeNA BayStars, qualifying him to become a member of the Meikyukai.

== See also ==
- List of Nippon Professional Baseball career hits leaders
