= Jang Hun =

- Hangul: 장훈
- RR: Jang Hun
- MR: Chang Hun

Jang Hun may refer to:

- Jang Hoon (born 1975), South Korean film director
- Isao Harimoto (born 1940), born Jang Hun, Korean baseball player living in Japan
