= Kihachi Enomoto =

Japanese baseball player (1936–2012)

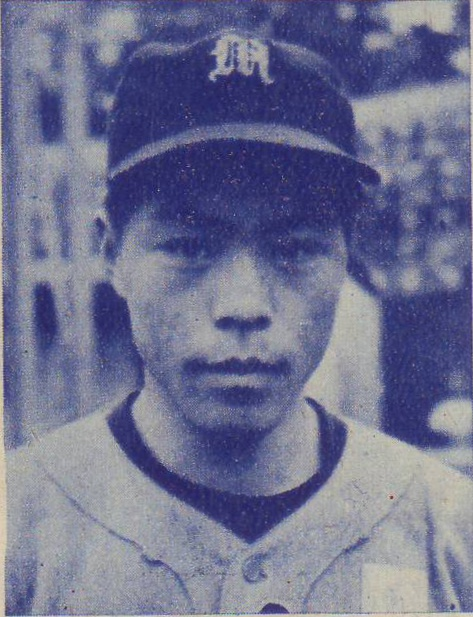
- First baseman
- Born: December 5, 1936; Tokyo, Japan
- Died: March 14, 2012 (aged 75)
- Batted: Left Threw: Left

NPB debut
- 1955, for the Mainichi Orions

Last appearance
- 1972, for the Nishitetsu Lions

NPB statistics
- Batting average: .298
- Hits: 2,314
- Home runs: 246
- Runs batted in: 979
- Stolen base: 153

Teams
- Mainichi/Daimai/Tokyo/Lotte Orions (1955-1971); Nishitetsu Lions (1972)

Career highlights and awards
- NPB Rookie of the Year (1955); 12× NPB All-Star (1955-1964, 1966, 1968); 9× Best Nine Award winner (1956, 1959-1964, 1966, 1968); Youngest NPB player to reach 2,000 hits (31 years, 7 months)

Member of the Japanese

Baseball Hall of Fame
- Induction: 2016

Kihachi Enomoto (榎本 喜八 Enomoto Kihachi, December 5, 1936 – March 14, 2012) was a Japanese former Nippon Professional Baseball first baseman. He batted and threw left-handed.

Enomoto was a 12-time All-Star, a 9-time Best Nine Award winner, and a Rookie of the Year winner, he was awarded all of these while under the Mainichi/Daimai/Tokyo/Lotte Orions. He was inducted into the Japanese Baseball Hall of Fame in 2016.

== Early life ==
Born in Tokyo, Enomoto attended Waseda Vocational High School. Other alumnus of the school include Hiroshi Arakawa, Akihiko Ohya, Daisuke Araki and Japanese baseball legend Sadaharu Oh, who would pitch against Enomoto in the 1971 Japan Series.

== Career ==
=== Mainichi/Daimai/Tokyo/Lotte Orions ===
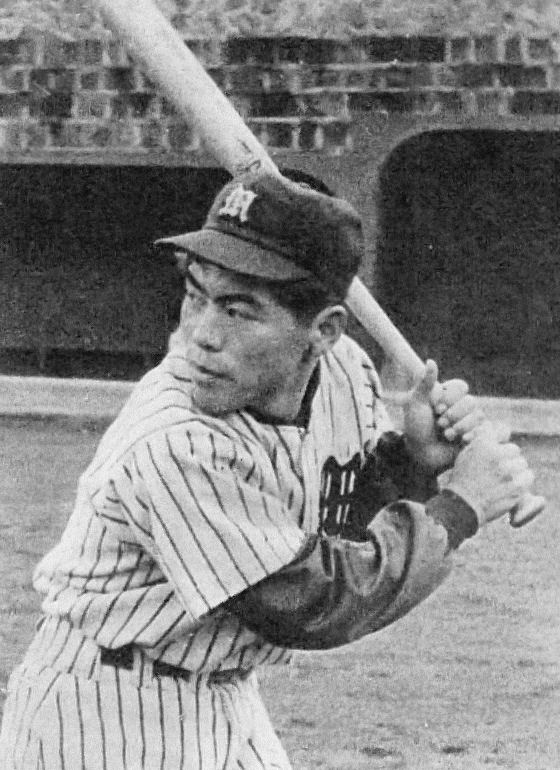
Enomoto in 1956

Straight out of high school, Enomoto started his career by winning the 1955 Pacific League Rookie of the Year Award. He was also an All-Star and led the league in walks. He came 10th in batting average, at .298. He set records for batters coming directly out of high school in runs, hits, doubles, walks and on-base percentage. The next year, Enomoto yet again led the league in walks and was also an All-Star. He also received his first Best Nine Award. Despite a slight decrease in stats, Enomoto still made the All-Star team in 1957. His stats decreased yet further in 1958, but he still made the All-Star team. 1958 marked the first time that he finished with more strikeouts than walks. His stats rose in 1959, playing in his fifth-straight all-star game and receiving his second Best Nine Award after hitting .276. In 1960, he played in an All-Star game and took home a Best Nine Award, but he also was a serious contender for the MVP Award after leading the league in batting average (.344), runs (94), hits (170), and doubles (37). His teammate, Kazuhiro Yamauchi, would win the title. Enomoto also went 3-for-15 in the 1960 Japan Series, as the Orions were swept by the Taiyo Whales. He would continue his form in 1961, hitting .331 (2nd in the league, behind Isao Harimoto) where he would make his 7th straight All-Star game and win his 3rd straight Best Nine Award. He hit 17 home runs in 1962, setting a personal record at that point. He led the league in hits with 160 as he was once again an All-Star and Best Nine Award selection. He would continue his All-Star and Best Nine streak through 1963 and 1964, leading the league in walks and hit by pitches in the latter year, before ending both of them in 1965, when he hit only .268, his lowest since 1958. He followed his subpar 1965 season with what could arguably be his best season, leading the league in hits (167), doubles (31), total bases (272), OBP (.434), slugging (.571), and average (.351). He took home the Best Nine and was an All-Star for the 11th time, but the MVP award went to Katsuya Nomura. 1967 marked the last time he would lead in any major category, with 83 walks. 1968 would be the last time he would be an All-Star (his 12th time) or a Best Nine selection (his 9th, a record). On July 21, 1968, Enomoto would get his 2,000th hit, doubling off of Hall of Famer Keishi Suzuki. Aged 31 years and 7 months, he was the youngest player ever to reach the mark and the 3rd all-time. He set more records, including setting a streak of 1,516 error-free chances from 1967 to 1968, and a .999 fielding percentage at first in 1968. In 1969, he hit .273, which would increase to .284 in 1970. His last year as an Orion, 1971, saw him bat .244 in just 45 games. The Orions lost the Japan Series to the Yomiuri Giants, leaving Enomoto without a Japan Series title.

=== Nishitestu Lions ===
Enomoto played his last professional season in 1972, with the Nishitetsu Lions, where he would hit .233 in 61 games. He finished his career with a .298 average, 2,222 games played, 1,169 runs, 2,314 hits, 409 doubles, 246 home runs, 979 RBI, 153 steals in 237 tries and 1,062 walks to 645 strikeouts in 7,763 AB and 9,002 plate appearances.

== Post-baseball ==
Despite qualifying for the Meikyukai, Enomoto never participated in their activities and is not deemed a member. Hiromitsu Ochiai is the only other player to turn down membership. Following his retirement, he worked for a parking garage management company, where he wrote about baseball. He died of colon cancer in 2012 and was posthumously inducted into the Japanese Baseball Hall of Fame in 2016.

== See also ==
- List of Nippon Professional Baseball career hits leaders
