= Kazuya Fukuura =

Japanese baseball player (born 1975)

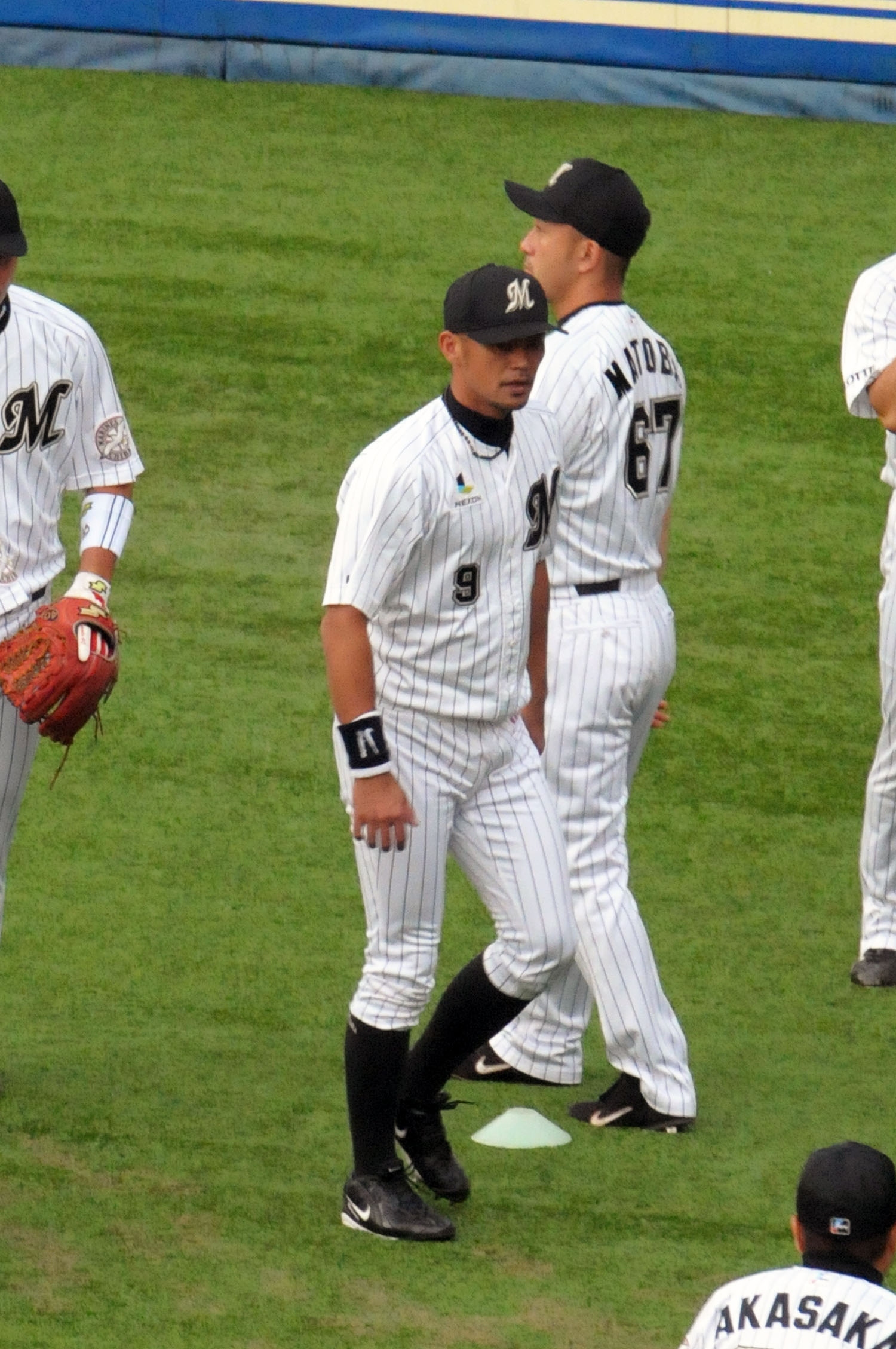
- Fukuura with the Chiba Lotte Marines

Chiba Lotte Marines – No. 70
- First baseman/Coach/Manager
- Born: December 14, 1975 (age 50); Narashino, Chiba, Japan
- Batted: Left Threw: Left

NPB debut
- Jul.5, 1997, for the Chiba Lotte Marines

Last appearance
- Sep.23, 2019, for the Chiba Lotte Marines

NPB statistics (through 2019)
- Batting average: .284
- Home runs: 118
- RBI: 935
- Hits: 2,000
- Stats at Baseball Reference

Teams
- As player: Chiba Lotte Marines (1994–2019); As coach: Chiba Lotte Marines (2018, 2019–2024); As manager: Chiba Lotte Marines (2025–present)

Career highlights and awards
- 3× NPB All-Star (2000, 2004, 2005); 3× Golden Glove Award (2003, 2005, 2007); 1× Best Nine Award (2010); 1× PL Batting Champion (2001); 2× Japan Series Champion (2005, 2010); Meikyukai Member (on 2018); Franchise player (22 years season)

Kazuya Fukuura (福浦 和也, born December 14, 1975) is a Japanese former professional baseball first baseman for the Chiba Lotte Marines in Japan's Nippon Professional Baseball.

His play and build drew comparisons to former Chicago Cubs player Mark Grace.

== Career ==
Starting his career as a pitcher before transitioning to a first baseman, Fukuura's skill set drew comparisons to former Chicago Cubs player Mark Grace. His debut in Nippon Professional Baseball (NPB) came in July 1997, marking the beginning of a prolific career. Over the years, Fukuura achieved a batting average of .284, with 118 home runs and 935 RBIs, reaching the significant milestone of 2,000 hits.

His accolades include three NPB All-Star selections (2000, 2004, 2005), three Golden Glove Awards (2003, 2005, 2007), and a Best Nine Award in 2010. Notably, he was the Pacific League Batting Champion in 2001 and contributed to the Japan Series Championships for the Marines in 2005 and 2010. Fukuura's consistent performance, characterized by a career .302 batting average as of 2005, and his ability to maintain an average above .300 every season since 2001, underscore his prowess as a contact hitter in a position often dominated by power hitters.

His double plays, leading the Pacific League with 50 doubles in 2003 and again in 2004 with 42, demonstrated his ability as a hitter. Despite the competitive environment and the presence of other talented players, Fukuura's dedication and skill earned him a place in the Meikyukai in 2018, recognizing his contributions to the sport.

In addition to his playing career, Fukuura also served as a coach for the Chiba Lotte Marines. His career provided lasting effects on Nippon Professional Baseball.

== See also ==
- List of Nippon Professional Baseball career hits leaders
