= Hayato Sakamoto =

Japanese baseball player (born 1988)

- Sakamoto with the Yomiuri Giants

Yomiuri Giants – No. 6
- Shortstop
- Born: December 14, 1988 (age 37); Itami, Hyōgo, Japan
- Bats: Right Throws: Right

NPB debut
- July 12, 2007, for the Yomiuri Giants

NPB statistics (through 2026)
- Batting average: .285
- Hits: 2,474
- Home runs: 303
- Runs batted in: 1,079
- Stolen bases: 163
- Stats at Baseball Reference

Teams
- Yomiuri Giants (2007–present)

Career highlights and awards
- NPB: Central League Rookie Player Special Award (2008); Central League MVP (2019); 7× Best Nine Award (2009, 2012, 2016, 2018-2021); 5× Central League Golden Glove Award (2016, 2017, 2019-2021); Central League batting champion (2016); 13× NPB All-Star (2008–2014, 2016–2019, 2021, 2022); 2× Japan Series champion (2009, 2012); Hochi Professional Sports Award (2009); Sports Nippon Shimbun Selected Super Play Award (2009); 2× Home Hero of the Year (2015, 2016); Asia Series MVP (2012); Itami Citizen Honor Award (2021); NPB records: NPB record 35-game on-base streak; International: Tokyo 2020 All-Olympic Baseball Team (2021); WBSC Premier12 Outstanding Defensive Player (2015)
Medals
Men's baseball
Representing Japan
Summer Olympics
Gold medal – first place	2020 Tokyo	Team
WBSC Premier12
Bronze medal – third place	2015 Tokyo	Team
Gold medal – first place	2019 Tokyo	Team

Hayato Sakamoto (坂本 勇人, Sakamoto Hayato; born December 14, 1988) is a Japanese professional baseball shortstop with the Yomiuri Giants of Nippon Professional Baseball (NPB).

In 2008, Sakamoto became the first player in Giants franchise history to start a season opener while under the age of 20 since Hideki Matsui.

== Early life ==
Sakamoto was born in Itami, Hyōgo, and began playing baseball while in the first grade at Koyanosato Elementary School for the Koyanosato Tigers (a Little League team) alongside former New York Yankees pitcher Masahiro Tanaka. Ironically, Sakamoto was the team's ace pitcher, and Tanaka his batterymate on the team. Both Sakamoto and Tanaka went on to attend Itami Municipal Matsuzaki Junior High School, but Sakamoto opted to join Itami Senior, while Tanaka chose to play for the Takarazuka Boys.

Upon graduating from junior high, Sakamoto attended Kosei Gakuin High School in northern Aomori Prefecture, a baseball powerhouse in the Tōhoku region. He became the team's starting shortstop by the fall of his first year (the equivalent of tenth grade in the United States) at Kosei Gakuin High. Sakamoto was hitting cleanup by the summer of his second year (eleventh grade), and led his team to runners-up in the Tohoku Regional Tournament that fall, earning a berth in the 78th National High School Baseball Invitational Tournament that would be held at Koshien Stadium the following spring. He attracted the attention of scouts when he hit .813 (13-for-16) with four home runs in the Tohoku Regional Tournament later that spring, and hit a total of 39 home runs during his high school career.

The Yomiuri Giants picked Sakamoto in the compensatory first round of the 2006 NPB high school player draft after losing to the Chunichi Dragons in the lottery that was held for fellow shortstop Naomichi Donoue, the most coveted high school position player, and presented Sakamoto the uniform number 61.

== Professional career ==
In 2007, Sakamoto spent most of his rookie season (2007) with the Giants' nigun team (Japanese for "minor league" or "farm team"). He played 77 games in the Western League, hitting .268 with five homers and 28 RBIs. Sakamoto saw his first call-up to the ichigun (major league) team in July and made his professional debut as a pinch runner on July 12. He recorded his first career base hit and RBI on September 6, knocking in the game-winning run in a game against the Dragons.

In 2008, Manager Tatsunori Hara had high hopes for Sakamoto in the 2008 season, playing him in all 15 pre-season (spring training) games at either shortstop or second base. Although Tomohiro Nioka, then the Giants' starting shortstop, returned from injury just before their season opener, Sakamoto's quick adjustment to second base, accompanied by left-hander Masanori Ishikawa's taking the mound for the opposing Tokyo Yakult Swallows, prompted Hara to start him in the season opener as the No. 8 hitter on March 28. Sakamoto became the first Giant to start a season opener while under the age of 20 since former New York Yankees outfielder Hideki Matsui did so in 1994.

Although Sakamoto was expected to platoon at second base with the likes of veteran journeyman Kimura Takuya and speedster Ryota Wakiya throughout the season, he returned to his natural position when Nioka tore his right calf muscle in that very game. Sakamoto started at shortstop from the second game onwards and never gave up the starting job. His first career home run came against the Hanshin Tigers on April 6, a grand slam off reliever Kenta Abe that made him the youngest player in Central League history (19 years, 114 days) to hit a grand slam in a regular season game. He was also voted to the All-Star team that year, getting his first hit in an All-Star game in Game 2 held at Yokohama Stadium on August 1.

Sakamoto finished the season with a .257 batting average, eight home runs, 43 RBI and 10 stolen bases, contributing to the Giants' league title that year. He made his first appearance in the Japan Series against the Saitama Seibu Lions on November 1, hitting a home run off veteran right-hander Fumiya Nishiguchi in Game 7 and becoming the first NPB player in 22 years to hit a home run in the Japan Series while being under the age of 20 (Kiyohara Kazuhiro last accomplished the feat while he was with the then-Seibu Lions). The Giants lost Game 7 3-2, coming up short in their run for a Japan Series championship.

Sakamoto also started all 144 games, becoming just the third player (and first in the Central League) to start every game of the season in one's second year out of high school (along with Futoshi Nakanishi and Kiyohara). Perhaps even more impressive was that if one were to include pre-season, All-Star, Climax Series (playoffs) and Japan Series games, Sakamoto played a grand total of 172 total games that year. Although the Central League Most Valuable Rookie award was presented to teammate and left-handed reliever Tetsuya Yamaguchi, who went 11-2 with a 2.32 ERA in 67 appearances, Sakamoto received a special award for his efforts. The Giants also rewarded him by giving him the uniform number 6.

In 2009, Sakamoto got off to a good start to the 2009 season (his third in the pros and second at the major league level), hitting .376 with a league-leading 11 doubles and slugging .541 for the month of April. He continued his torrid streak into May, hitting multiple home runs (the second a game-winning solo shot off closer Kyuji Fujikawa) in a single game for the first time on May 2 against the Tigers and passing Tigers slugger Tomoaki Kanemoto to take the league lead in batting average that week. He hit the first walk-off home run of his career on May 6 off reliever Hiroki Sanada (who was a teammate of Sakamoto until he was traded midway through the 2008 season) in a game against the Yokohama BayStars.

In 2015, Sakamoto was named captain of the Giants. He finished the regular season with a .269 batting average and 12 home runs, and for the first time since 2007 was not selected as an all-star. Sakamoto would bounce back in 2016, hitting .344 with 23 home runs and a .988 OPS, and was once again named an all-star. However, the Giants would miss the postseason for the first time since 2006.

In 2018, he was selected to his 10th All-Star Series and finished the regular season with a career-high .345 batting average.

In 2019, Sakamoto won his first MVP award. He finished the regular season with a .312 batting average, 40 home runs and 94 RBI, and helped the Giants reach the 2019 Japan Series. However, the Giants were swept by the Fukuoka SoftBank Hawks in four games. Sakamoto collected just one hit in 13 at-bats during the series.

On June 3, 2020, it was announced that Sakamoto and Giants teammate Takumi Ohshiro both tested positive for COVID-19. However, he was cleared to return to the starting lineup for the Giants' 2020 season opener against the Hanshin Tigers on June 19. On November 8, 2020, Sakamoto collected his 2,000th career hit, becoming the 53rd player to do so and the second youngest to achieve it after Kihachi Enomoto.

On September 7, 2023, Sakamoto started at third base for the first time in his 17-year career. Previously, he had only started at second base or shortstop.

== International career ==
As a member of the Japan national baseball team Sakamoto has participated in the 2012 exhibition games against Cuba, 2013 World Baseball Classic, 2014 MLB Japan All-Star Series, 2015 exhibition games against Europe, 2015 WBSC Premier12, 2016 exhibition games against Mexico and Netherlands, 2017 World Baseball Classic and 2019 WBSC Premier12.

In the 2013 World Baseball Classic, he was the starting shortstop. Like most of his teammates, he had problems at the batting plate, as he was unable to hit for consistency during the pool rounds, though he had a crucial RBI single equalizer against Chinese Taipei in the bottom of the 8th of that game. Sakamoto seemed to regain his batting sense alongside his teammates in the 16-4 mulling of the Netherlands that qualified Team Japan to the semi-finals, hitting 2-5 in the game including a grand slam in the top of the 7th that gave Japan a more than 10 run lead needed to end the game early via mercy rule, securing an early ticket to the semis. However, Team Japan lost their semi-final match against Puerto Rico 3-1, thus finishing third and losing their two-time defending championship streak.

On October 1, 2019, he was selected to participate at the 2019 WBSC Premier12.

On November 16, 2018, Sakamoto was selected for the Yomiuri Giants roster at the 2018 MLB Japan All-Star Series exhibition game against MLB All-Stars.

== Playing style ==
=== Hitting ===
Listed at 6 ft 1 in and 176 lb, Sakamoto has a relatively large frame for a Japanese middle infielder. He is a spray hitter whose swing is characterized by a pronounced leg kick.

=== Fielding ===
Sakamoto has 193 errors in his professional career, but has shown versatility playing games at all 5 infield positions.

== See also ==
- List of Nippon Professional Baseball players with 1,000 runs batted in
- List of Nippon Professional Baseball career hits leaders
