= Hiroyuki Yamazaki =

- Second baseman / Shortstop
- Born: December 22, 1946 (age 79); Ageo, Japan
- Batted: Right Threw: Right

NPB debut
- April 10, 1965, for the Tokyo Orions

Last appearance
- 1984, for the Seibu Lions

NPB statistics
- Batting average: .265
- Hits: 2,081
- Home runs: 270
- Runs batted in: 985
- Stolen bases: 137
- Stats at Baseball Reference

Teams
- Tokyo/Lotte Orions (1965-1978); Seibu Lions (1979-1984)

Career highlights and awards
- 5x Best Nine Award winner (1969-1971, 1974, 1980); 3x Golden Glove Award (1977, 1980-1981); 11x NPB All-Star (1969-1970, 1972-1977, 1980-1981, 1983); 2x NPB batting average leader (1969, 1974); Hit for the cycle on August 14, 1971; Meikyukai member

Hiroyuki Yamazaki (山崎 裕之, Yamazaki Hiroyuki; born December 22, 1946) is a Japanese former Nippon Professional Baseball second baseman and shortstop. He played for the Tokyo/Lotte Orions from 1965 until 1978 and the Seibu Lions from 1979 until his retirement in 1984.

Over his career, he won five Best Nine Awards and three Golden Glove Awards. He led the NPB in batting average twice and was an All-Star eleven times. With 2081 hits, he is a member of the Meikyukai and is ranked 37th in terms of NPB players by total career hits.

== Early life ==
Before playing professional baseball, Yamazaki grew up in Ageo and attended high school there. He participated in the 1964 Japanese High School Baseball Championship as a shortstop. Out of high school, he drew comparisons to Shigeo Nagashima due to his home run-hitting ability. Unrelated to his baseball ability, Yamazaki was a participant in the 1964 Summer Olympics torch relay.

== Playing career ==
=== Tokyo/Lotte Orions ===
He joined the Tokyo Orions in 1965. His contract fee coming out of high school was reportedly very high and may have helped lead to the formation of the NPB draft later that year.

Yamazaki made his debut on April 10 against the Toei Flyers and had his first hit in the NPB the next day. That year, he recorded 36 hits and recorded a .190 batting average. His second season was cut short due to a broken jaw, leaving him with eight hits and a .123 average. 1967 marked the first time he hit above the Mendoza Line, recording 76 hits. He improved upon that the next season, hitting .255 with 107 hits, 14 of those being home runs. He was a regular at shortstop and set the record for most putouts in a game for the position on September 1 against the Nankai Hawks. He switched to second base the following season. 1969 could be called Yamazaki's breakout season. He hit .301 with 149 hits and 14 home runs. He was selected as an All-Star and Pacific League Best Nine Award winner for the first time. 1970 saw a slight decrease in offensive production for Yamazaki, going to a .247 average with 117 hits, but he still was an All-Star and Best Nine selection and recorded 25 home runs, tied for the most he would hit in a season. In 1971, Yamazaki was selected for a Best Nine Award but did not make the All-Star team. His stats did improve a bit, going to a .280 average with 123 hits. On August 14, Yamazaki hit for the cycle against the Toei Flyers, the second Orions player to accomplish the feat. 1972 saw Yamazuki obtain a .242 average and 107 hits. On the defensive side, he set a new Pacific League record, with 272 consecutive putout attempts without an error.

1973 saw yet another stat decrease, going to a .239 average and 90 hits. He yet again made the All-Star team. He was another Best Nine selection in 1974, hitting .278 with 126 hits. 1975 and 1976 were both All-Star seasons, hitting .270 and .273 with 116 and 114 hits, respectively. In 1977, he was not only an All-Star (hitting .257 with 116 hits), but he was selected for the relatively new Golden Glove Award. In his final year with the Orions in 1978, he hit .290 with 126 hits, but failed to qualify for any awards for the first time since 1968.

=== Seibu Lions ===
Yamazaki was traded to the Seibu Lions, not far from his hometown of Ageo, for the 1979 season. His first season for his new team saw him go .332 with 95 hits, missing a few games in the season and failing to obtain any awards for the second year in a row. 1980 was the only season where Yamazaki won All-Star, Best Nine, and Gold Glove honors. He hit .294 with 140 hits that season. He hit more than 20 home runs for the first time since 1971, obtaining 25. On August 7, against the Kintetsu Buffaloes, he hit two home runs in one inning. 1981 saw him as a Gold Glove and an All-Star recipient, with a .271 average and 124 hits. His 97 runs scored led the league. 1982 was a seemingly quieter year, he had 102 hits with a .246 average and no awards. In 1983, he led the league in plate appearances, at-bats, and runs on his way to his eleventh and final All-Star appearance. He had a .287 average and recorded a career-high 148 wins. On September 1, he hit two home runs in one inning yet again, this time against the Nippon-Ham Fighters. 17 days later, against his former team, he recorded his 2,000th hit, becoming the 18th player to achieve the feat in Japanese baseball history. In his final season, he had a .228 average and 61 hits. He retired after that season.

== Post-playing career ==
When he retired, Yamazaki became a member of the Meikyukai and has been involved in events of the club. He has since become a baseball writer and commentator.

== See also ==
- List of Nippon Professional Baseball career hits leaders
