= Takumi Kuriyama =

Japanese baseball player (born 1983)

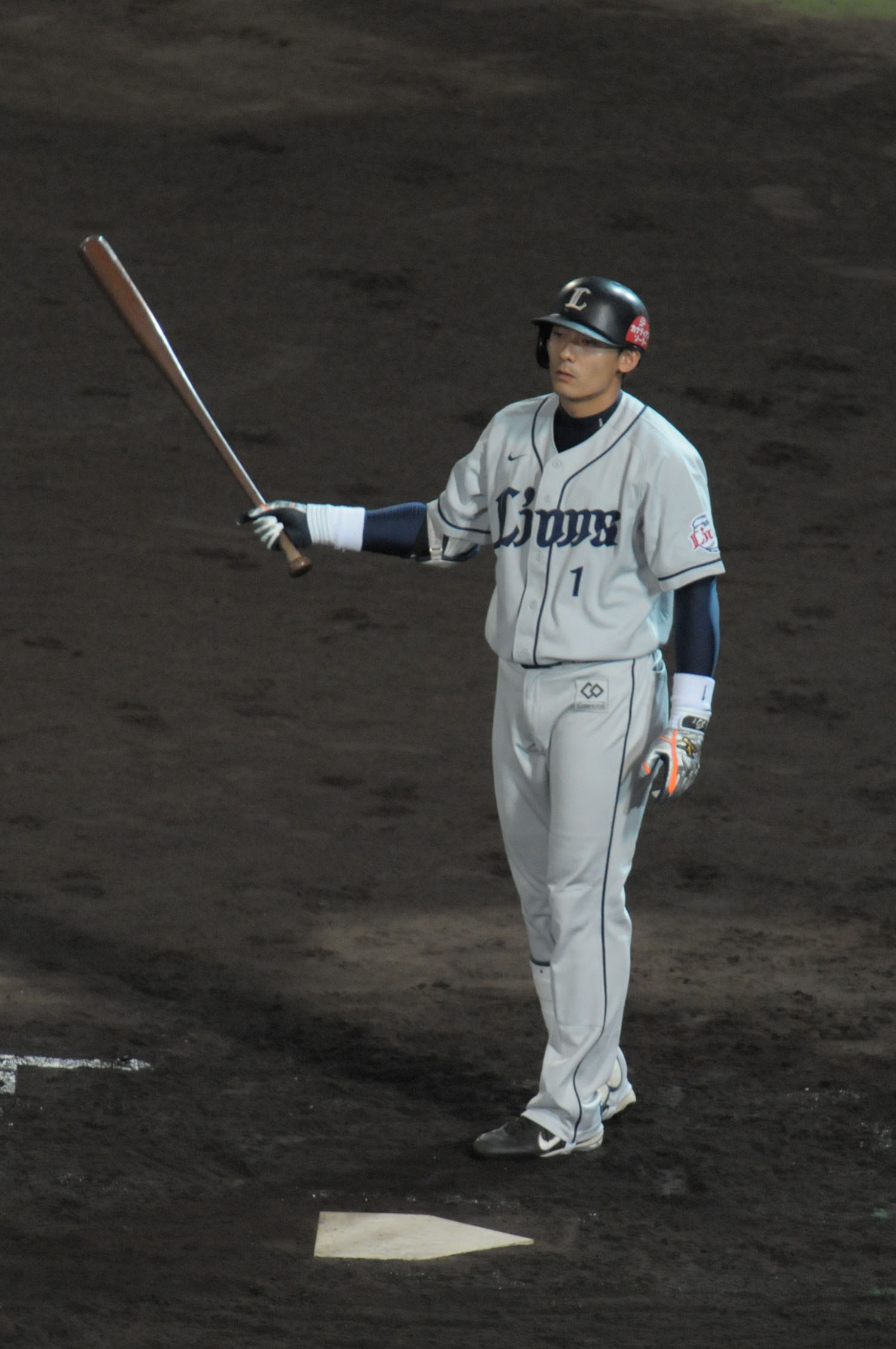
- Kuriyama with the Saitama Seibu Lions

Saitama Seibu Lions – No. 1
- Outfielder
- Born: September 3, 1983 (age 42); Kobe, Hyōgo, Japan
- Bats: Left Throws: Right

NPB debut
- September 24, 2004, for the Seibu Lions

NPB statistics (through 2023 season)
- Batting average: .279
- Hits: 2,120
- Home runs: 127
- RBIs: 902
- Stats at Baseball Reference

Teams
- Seibu Lions / Saitama Seibu Lions (2004 – present)

Career highlights and awards
- 1× Japan Series champion (2008)
- Last updated on: February 11, 2024

Takumi Kuriyama (栗山 巧, Kuriyama Takumi; born September 3, 1983 in Kobe, Hyōgo, Japan) is a Nippon Professional Baseball player for the Saitama Seibu Lions in Japan's Pacific League.

== Career ==
Kuriyama began his Nippon Professional Baseball (NPB) debut with the Seibu Lions in 2004, he has remained with throughout his career.

Kuriyama's career has been marked by consistent performance and dedication, earning him a place as a fan favorite and a respected figure among his peers. His left-handed batting and right-handed throws have made him a versatile outfielder, contributing significantly to his team's successes over the years. Notably, Kuriyama was part of the Japan Series champion team in 2008, a testament to his skill and contribution to the sport.

Standing at 5 feet 10 inches and weighing 187 pounds, Kuriyama's presence on the field is formidable. Over the years, he has accumulated impressive statistics, including a batting average of .279, 2,120 hits, 127 home runs, and 902 RBIs through the 2023 season. His achievements also include becoming a member of the prestigious Meikyuukai in 2021, an honor bestowed upon players who have reached particular milestones in hits, home runs, and wins.

Kuriyama's career statistics reflect his journey through the NPB. From his debut in 2004 to the present, he has shown growth and resilience. In 2005, he played 84 games with a batting average of .297. By 2010, he had improved to a .310 average over 144 games. His performance peaked in 2008, coinciding with his team's championship victory, where he achieved a .317 batting average.

== See also ==
- List of Nippon Professional Baseball career hits leaders
