= Tomonori Maeda =

Japanese baseball player (born 1971)

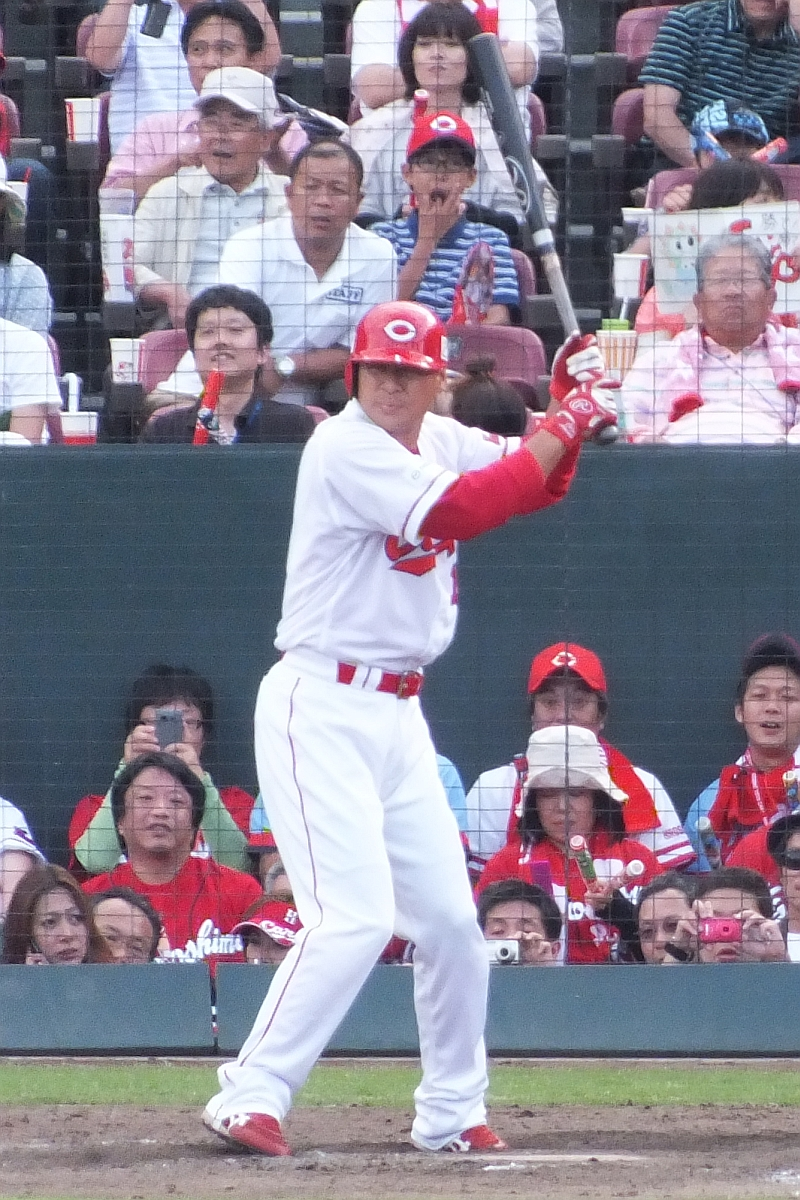
- Outfielder
- Born: June 14, 1971 (age 55); Kumamoto, Japan
- Batted: Left Threw: Right

NPB debut
- June 6, 1990, for the Hiroshima Toyo Carp

Last NPB appearance
- October 3, 2013, for the Hiroshima Toyo Carp
- Stats at Baseball Reference

Teams
- Hiroshima Toyo Carp (1990 – 2013)

Career highlights and awards
- 4× Best Nine Award (1992 - 1994, 1998); 4× Golden Glove Award (1991 - 1994); 3× JCB, MEP Award (1992, 1997, 1998); 1× Comeback Player of the Year (2002); 7× NPB All-Star (1993, 1994, 1996, 1998, 2005, 2007, 2008); 1× NPB All-Star MVP (2005)

Tomonori Maeda (前田 智徳, Maeda Tomonori; born June 14, 1971 in Kumamoto, Japan) is a former Nippon Professional Baseball player who retired after the 2013 season. Maeda's career spanned 24 seasons, all spent with the Hiroshima Toyo Carp in Japan's Central League. He played in one Japan Series, batting .158 with a triple and two stolen bases in a 7-game loss against the Seibu Lions in 1991.

Some of his career accomplishments include:

- 200 home runs (295)
- 2000 games played (2188)
- 7000 at bats (7008)
- 2000 hits (2119)
- 900 runs (929)
- 1100 runs batted in (1112)
- 300 doubles (353)
- 3000 total bases (3391)
- 500 walks (586)
- .300 batting average (.302)

== See also ==
- Nippon Professional Baseball Comeback Player of the Year Award
- List of Nippon Professional Baseball players with 1,000 runs batted in
- List of Nippon Professional Baseball career hits leaders
