= List of Nippon Professional Baseball career hits leaders =

Listed are all Nippon Professional Baseball players who have reached the 2,000 hit milestone during their career in NPB. Isao Harimoto holds the Japanese record for most career hits with 3,085 and is the only player with more than 3,000 hits in Japan; he had his 3,000th hit on May 28, 1980 for the Lotte Orions.

== Players with 2,000 or more hits ==
*	Denotes elected to Japanese Baseball Hall of Fame.
**Bold**	Denotes active player. (Note: A player is considered inactive if he has announced his retirement or not played for a full season.)

- Stats updated as of end of 2026 season.

Rank	Player	Hits
1	Isao Harimoto *	3,085
2	Katsuya Nomura *	2,901
3	Sadaharu Oh *	2,786
4	Hiromitsu Kadota *	2,566
5	Yutaka Fukumoto *	2,543
5	Sachio Kinugasa *	2,543
7	Tomoaki Kanemoto *	2,539
8	Kazuyoshi Tatsunami *	2,480
9	**Hayato Sakamoto**	2,474
10	Shigeo Nagashima *	2,471
11	Masahiro Doi	2,452
12	Takuro Ishii	2,432
13	Hiromitsu Ochiai *	2,371
14	Tetsuharu Kawakami *	2,351
15	Koji Yamamoto *	2,339
16	Kihachi Enomoto *	2,314
17	Morimichi Takagi *	2,274
18	Kazuhiro Yamauchi *	2,271
19	Katsuo Osugi *	2,228
20	Yasunori Oshima	2,204
21	Takahiro Arai	2,203
22	Seiichi Uchikawa	2,186
23	Tsutomu Wakamatsu *	2,173
24	Atsunori Inaba	2,167
25	Koji Akiyama *	2,157
25	Yoshinori Hirose	2,157
27	Takumi Kuriyama	2,152
28	Shinya Miyamoto	2,133
29	Shinnosuke Abe	2,132
30	Kazuhiro Kiyohara	2,122
31	Michihiro Ogasawara	2,120
32	Tomonori Maeda	2,119
33	Motonobu Tanishige	2,108
34	**Hideto Asamura**	2,105
35	Norihiro Nakamura	2,101
36	Takashi Toritani	2,099
37	Atsuya Furuta *	2,097
38	Makoto Matsubara	2,095
39	Kazuo Matsui	2,090
40	Hiroyuki Yamazaki	2,081
41	**Yohei Oshima**	2,079
42	Taira Fujita	2,064
43	Kenichi Yazawa	2,062
44	Michiyo Arito	2,057
44	Shinichi Eto *	2,057
46	Hideji Katō	2,055
47	Kazuhiro Wada	2,050
48	Masahiro Araki	2,045
49	Hiroki Kokubo	2,041
50	Hiromasa Arai	2,038
51	Kenjiro Nomura	2,020
52	Isao Shibata	2,018
53	Alex Ramírez *	2,017
54	Yukio Tanaka	2,012
55	Norihiro Komada	2,006
56	Kazuya Fukuura	2,000

== See also ==
- List of Nippon Professional Baseball players with 1,000 runs batted in
- List of Nippon Professional Baseball earned run average champions
- Nippon Professional Baseball Most Valuable Player Award
- List of KBO Career Hits leaders
