= Yukio Tanaka (baseball) =

Japanese baseball player (born 1967)

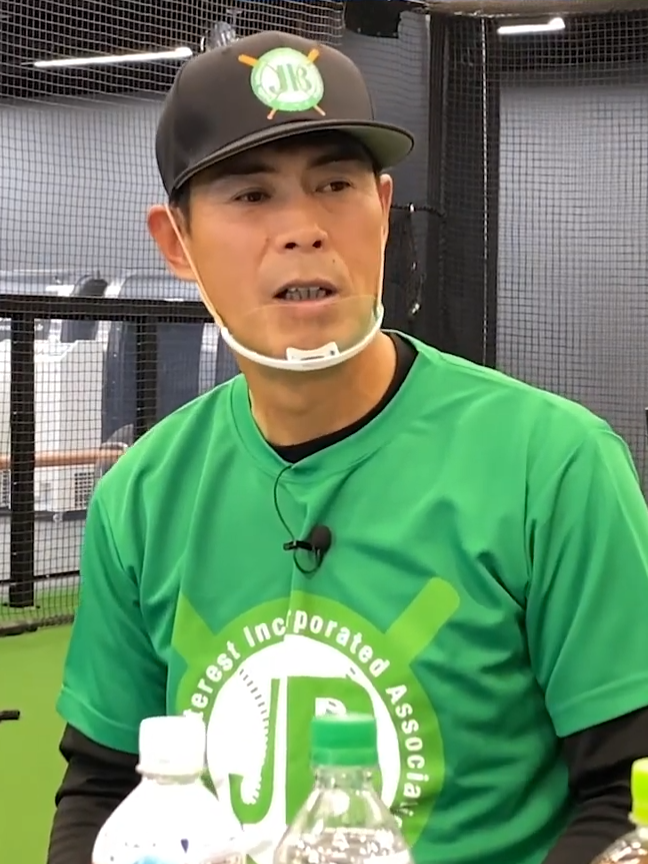
- Infielder, Coach
- Born: December 14, 1967 (age 58); Miyazaki, Japan
- Batted: Right Threw: Right

debut
- June 10, 1986, for the Nippon Ham Fighters

Last appearance
- 2007, for the Hokkaido Nippon-Ham Fighters

Career statistics
- AVG.: .262
- HR: 287
- RBI: 1,026
- Stats at Baseball Reference

Teams
- As player: Nippon-Ham Fighters/Hokkaido Nippon-Ham Fighters (1986–2007); As coach: Hokkaido Nippon-Ham Fighters (2010–2017)

Career highlights and awards
- 1× Japan Series champions (2006)

Yukio Tanaka (田中 幸雄, Tanaka Yukio; born December 14, 1967 in Miyakonojō, Miyazaki) is a Japanese former baseball player for the Hokkaido Nippon-Ham Fighters of Nippon Professional Baseball. He played for the Fighters during all 22 years of his professional career, earning the nickname "Mr. Fighters".

Tanaka played for Japan's national team in the 2000 Summer Olympics. On May 15, 2007, he recorded his 2,000th career hit during a game against Tohoku Rakuten Golden Eagles, automatically becoming a member of Meikyukai (the Golden Players Club). For most of his career, Tanaka wore uniform number 6. Tanaka retired in 2007. As a coach, he wears #72.

The minor planet 20019 Yukiotanaka is named after Tanaka.

== See also ==
- List of Nippon Professional Baseball career hits leaders
