= Keishi Suzuki =

Japanese baseball player and manager

Kintetsu Buffaloes – No. 1
- Pitcher
- Born: September 28, 1947 (age 78); Nishiwaki, Hyōgo, Japan
- Batted: Left Threw: Left

debut
- 1966, for the Kintetsu Buffaloes

Last appearance
- 1985, for the Kintetsu Buffaloes

Career statistics
- Win–loss record: 317–238
- Earned run average: 3.11
- Strikeouts: 3,061

Teams
- As player: Kintetsu Buffaloes (1966–1985); As manager: Kintetsu Buffaloes (1993–1995)

Career highlights and awards
- Japanese Triple Crown (1978); 8x 20-game winner; Pitched two no-hitters

Member of the Japanese

Baseball Hall of Fame
- Induction: 2002

Keishi Suzuki (鈴木 啓示, Suzuki Keishi; born September 28, 1947) is a Japanese former professional baseball pitcher in Nippon Professional Baseball (NPB). He played for the Kintetsu Buffaloes from 1966 to 1985. A member of both Meikyukai and the Japanese Baseball Hall of Fame, his 317 career victories ranks him fourth on the all-time NPB list.

== Biography ==
Suzuki attended Ikuei High School, and was drafted by the Buffaloes at age 18.

In 1967, Suzuki led the Pacific League (PL) in strikeouts with 222. In 1968, he led the PL again, this time with 305 strikeouts. (He led the NPB in innings pitched that season as well, with 359.) 1969 was a banner year for Suzuki, as he led NPB in victories, strikeouts, and innings pitched. In 1970 he again led the PL in strikeouts, with 247. He was the Pacific League ERA champion in 1978, with a mark of 2.02. Altogether, he led NPB in strikeouts in eight separate seasons. With 71 career shutouts, he ranks fifth all-time in Japanese professional baseball.

Suzuki was also a fairly good hitter for a pitcher, with a lifetime .209 batting average and 13 home runs in the nine seasons he batted before the Pacific League implemented the designated hitter in 1975.

After his playing career, he was the manager of the Kintetsu Buffaloes from 1993 to 1995, where he managed Hideo Nomo (although the two men did not get along).

He was elected to the Japanese Baseball Hall of Fame in 2002. With 200+ victories, he is also a member of Meikyukai. His number 1 jersey was retired by the Buffaloes before their merger with the Orix BlueWave.

== See also ==
- List of top Nippon Professional Baseball strikeout pitchers
