= Yoshinori Hirose =

Japanese baseball player and manager (1936–2025)

Yoshinori Hirose 広瀬 叔功
- Outfield
- Born: August 27, 1936; Ōno, Hiroshima, Japan
- Died: November 2, 2025 (aged 89)

NPB debut
- 1956, for the Nankai Hawks

Last appearance
- 1977, for the Nankai Hawks

NPB statistics
- Batting average: .282
- Hits: 2,157
- Stolen bases: 596
- Home runs: 131
- Runs batted in: 705

Teams
- As player: Nankai Hawks (1956–1977); As manager: Nankai Hawks (1978–1980); As coach: Fukuoka Daiei Hawks (1991–1992)

Career highlights and awards
- 1964 NPB Batting Champion; 2x Japan Series champion (1959, 1964); 3x Best Nine Award (1963-1965); Diamond Glove Award (1972); 5x NPB Stolen bases leader (1961-1965)

Member of the Japanese

Baseball Hall of Fame
- Induction: 1999
- Election method: Selection Committee for the Players

Yoshinori Hirose (広瀬 叔功, Hirose Yoshinori; August 27, 1936 – November 2, 2025) was a Japanese professional baseball outfielder in Japan's Nippon Professional Baseball. In 1999, he was voted into the Japanese Baseball Hall of Fame. He ranks second all-time in the NPB for stolen bases, with 596. He was also a member of the Meikyukai. Hirose died on November 2, 2025, at the age of 89.

== See also ==
- List of Nippon Professional Baseball career hits leaders
