= Tetsuya Yoneda =

Japanese baseball player

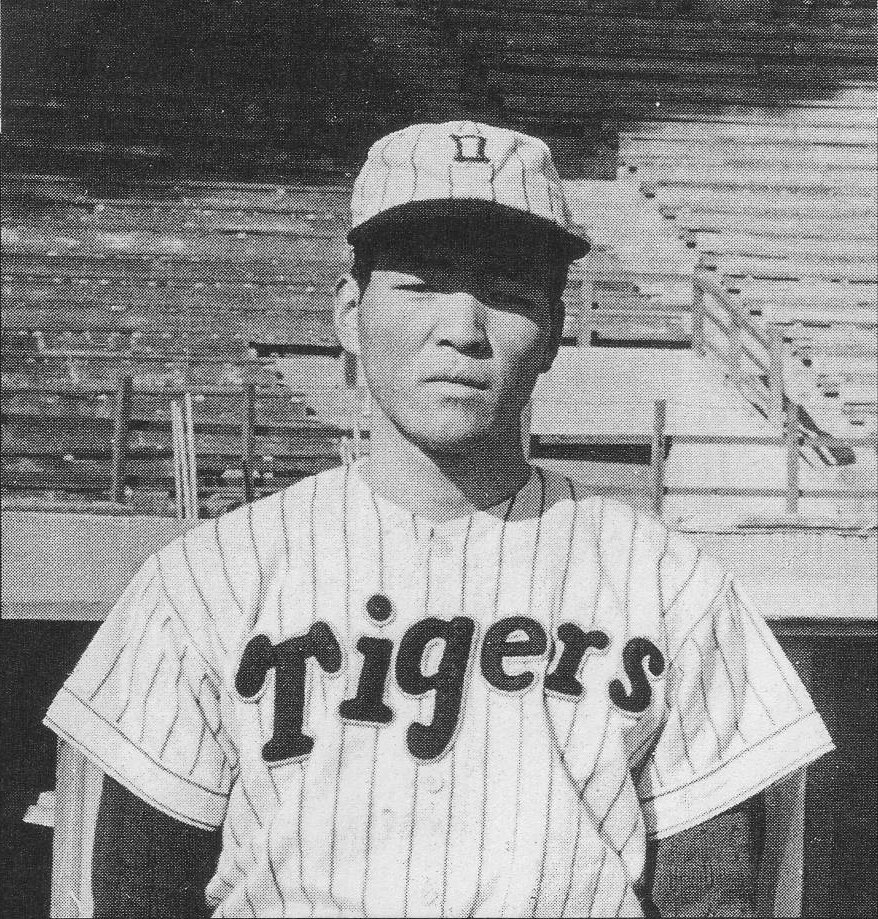
- Tetsuya Yoneda (taken on January 10, 1956)
- Pitcher
- Born: March 3, 1938 (age 88); Tottori, Japan
- Batted: Right Threw: Right

NPB debut
- 1956, for the Hankyu Braves

Last NPB appearance
- 1977, for the Kintetsu Buffaloes

NPB statistics
- Win–loss: 350–285
- ERA: 2.91
- Shutouts: 64
- Innings pitched: 5130
- Strikeouts: 3388
- Stats at Baseball Reference

Teams
- As player: Hankyu Braves (1956–1975); Hanshin Tigers (1975–1976); Kintetsu Buffaloes (1977)

Career highlights and awards
- 1968 Pacific League MVP; 8x 20-game winner; 14x All-Star

Member of the Japanese

Baseball Hall of Fame
- Induction: 2000

Tetsuya Yoneda (Japanese: 米田 哲也, born March 3, 1938) is a Japanese former professional baseball pitcher who spent most of his career with the Hankyu Braves in Japan's Nippon Professional Baseball. He was so tough that he was known as Gasoline Tank and also Human Tank. Yoneda was inducted into the Japanese Baseball Hall of Fame in 2000.

== Career ==
Yoneda attended Sakai High School. He was signed out of high school by the Hanshin Tigers, but his selection was invalidated after Hankyu complained of an impropriety; he then signed with Hankyu.

Yoneda won 21 games at age 19, and 23 games at age 20 in 1958. That year he also tossed 11 shutouts, a Pacific League record that still stands.

Yoneda led the Pacific League (PL) in losses in 1959 with 24 (despite a 2.12 ERA and 20 complete games, including five shutouts). He led the Pacific League in strikeouts in 1962 with 231. In 1963 Yoneda again led the PL in losses with 23. In 1966 Yoneda led the PL in wins with 25, and innings pitched with 310.

In 1968 Yoneda went 29–13, with a 2.79 ERA and 237 strikeouts. He had 22 complete games and 6 shutouts, winning the Pacific League Most Valuable Player Award. The Braves made it to the Japan Series three straight years (1967–1969) losing all three times to the Yomiuri Giants.

During his career, Yoneda won 20 or more games eight separate times. In total, he won 350 games and accumulated 3,388 strikeouts. He is the career victories and strikeout leader for right-handed pitchers, and #2 on both all-time lists behind Masaichi Kaneda. Yoneda was also a strong hitter for a pitcher, slugging 33 home runs in his 22 seasons in NPB. Yoneda was a founding member of Meikyukai in 1978.
