= Masaaki Koyama =

Japanese baseball player and coach (1934–2025)

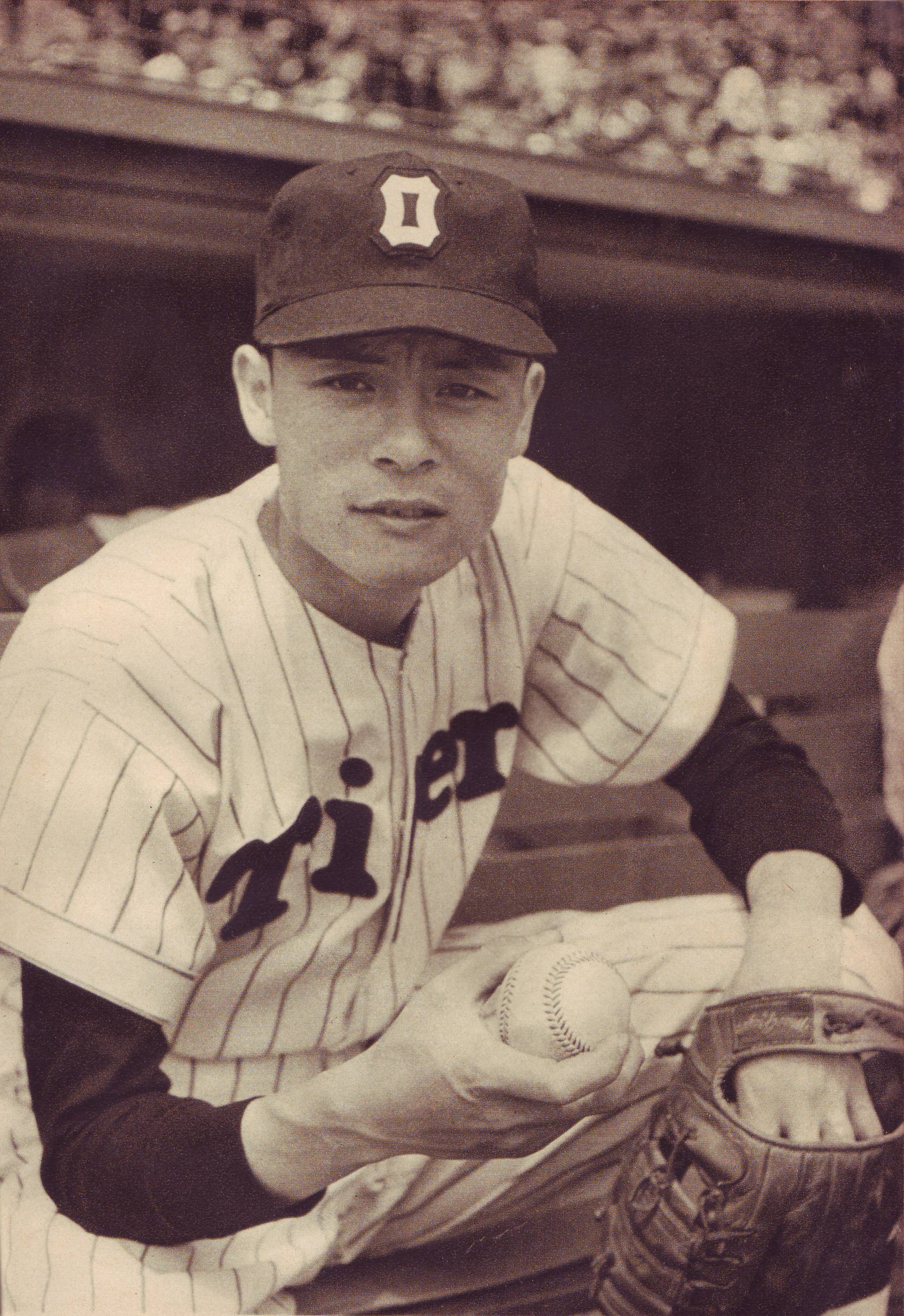
- Koyama in 1959
- Pitcher
- Born: July 28, 1934; Akashi, Hyōgo, Japan
- Died: April 18, 2025 (aged 90)
- Batted: Right Threw: Right

debut
- 1953, for the Osaka Tigers

Last appearance
- 1973, for the Taiyo Whales

Career statistics
- Win–loss record: 320–232
- Earned run average: 2.45
- Strikeouts: 3,159

Teams
- As player: Osaka Tigers / Hanshin Tigers (1953–1963); Tokyo Orions / Lotte Orions (1964–1972); Taiyo Whales (1973); As coach: Tokyo Orions (1966–1968); Taiyo Whales (1973); Hanshin Tigers (1974–1975, 1982–1983, 1998); Seibu Lions (1990–1991); Fukuoka Daiei Hawks (1993–1994)

Career highlights and awards
- Eiji Sawamura Award (1962)

Member of the Japanese

Baseball Hall of Fame
- Induction: 2001

Masaaki Koyama (小山 正明, Koyama Masaaki; July 28, 1934 – April 18, 2025) was a Japanese professional baseball pitcher in Nippon Professional Baseball (NPB). He played for the Osaka / Hanshin Tigers from 1953 to 1963, the Tokyo / Lotte Orions from 1964 to 1972, and the Taiyo Whales in 1973. He is a member of the Japanese Baseball Hall of Fame.

A right-handed pitcher, Koyama threw hard and was known for his effective slider and pinpoint control. He ranks third all-time in the NPB in wins (320), strikeouts (3,159), innings pitched (4,899), and shutouts (74). He won 20 or more games 7 separate times, was selected to eleven All-Star teams, and won the 1962 Eiji Sawamura Award.

== Biography ==
Koyama attended Takasago High School, and entered NPB at age 18, drafted by the Osaka Tigers.

Koyama won 20 or more games three straight years from 1958 to 1960; in 1959 he led the Central League in innings pitched, with 344. He had at least 200 strikeouts for 7 straight seasons from 1956 to 1962.

In 1961, Koyama suffered his first losing season, going 11–22, leading the Central League in losses despite a stellar 2.41 earned run average.

In 1962, Koyama had 13 shutouts, including five in a row, on his way to a 27–11 record with a 1.66 ERA and the Sawamura Award. He also led all of NPB in strikeouts, with 270. Unfortunately, he lost two games in that year's Japan Series, as the Tigers fell to the champion Toei Flyers. (Koyama ended up on the losing end of three Japan Series, never winning a championship.)

In 1964, Koyama switched teams (and leagues) and went 30-12 for the Tokyo Orions, leading all of NPB in victories, with a 2.41. ERA. That year he had 25 complete games and led all of NPB in innings pitched, with 361 1/3. He won at least 20 games three straight years from 1964 to 1966 (although in 1965 he also lost 20 games).

With 200+ wins, Koyama was a founding member of Meikyukai in 1978. He was elected to the Japanese Baseball Hall of Fame in 2001.

On May 2, 1992, Tsutomu Seki discovered the minor planet 1992 JE, naming it "13553 Masaakikoyama" in honor of Koyama.

Koyama died on April 18, 2025, at the age of 90.

== See also ==
- List of top Nippon Professional Baseball strikeout pitchers
