= Katsuya Nomura =

Japanese baseball player and manager (1935–2020)

Katsuya Nomura 野村 克也
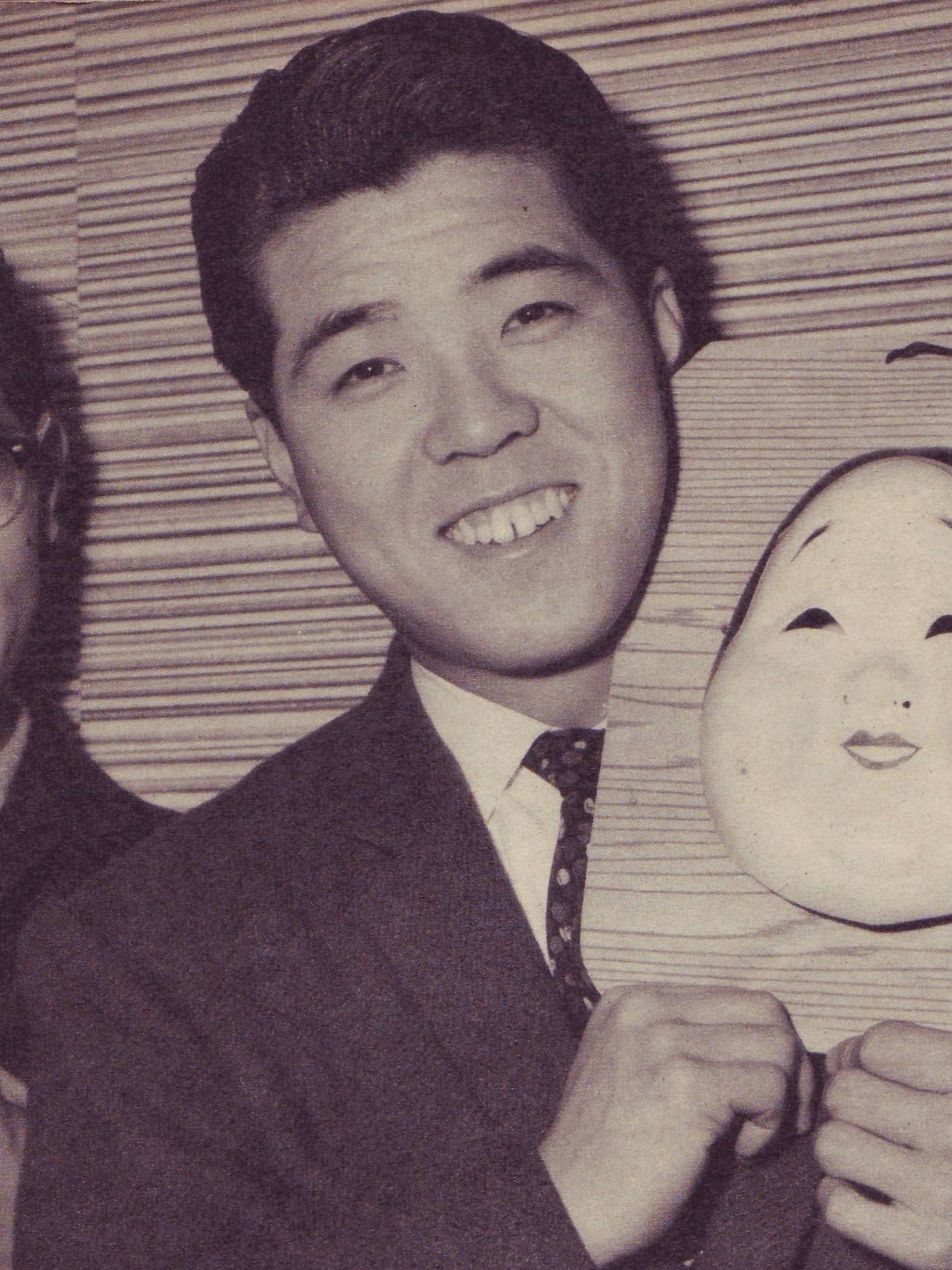
- Nomura in 1959
- Catcher / Manager
- Born: June 29, 1935; Kyōtango, Kyoto, Japan
- Died: February 11, 2020 (aged 84); Setagaya, Tokyo, Japan
- Batted: Right Threw: Right

NPB debut
- June 17, 1954, for the Nankai Hawks

Last NPB appearance
- October 3, 1980, for the Seibu Lions

NPB statistics
- Batting average: .277
- Hits: 2,901
- HRs: 657
- RBIs: 1,988
- Managerial record: 1,565–1,563–76
- Winning %: .500
- Stats at Baseball Reference

Teams
- As player: Nankai Hawks (1954–1977); Lotte Orions (1978); Seibu Lions (1979–1980); As manager: Nankai Hawks (1970–1977); Yakult Swallows (1990–1998); Hanshin Tigers (1999–2001); Tohoku Rakuten Golden Eagles (2006–2009)

Career highlights and awards
- As player: 5× PL MVP (1961, 1963, 1965, 1966, 1973); 2x Japan Series champion (1959, 1964); Triple Crown (1965); 9x PL home run leader (1957, 1961–1968); 7x PL RBI leader (1962–1967, 1972); 19x Best Nine Award (1956–1968, 1970–1973, 1975, 1976); 2x All-Star Series MVP (1972, 1977); Matsutaro Shoriki Award (1993); As manager: 3x Japan Series champion (1993, 1995, 1997)

Member of the Japanese

Baseball Hall of Fame
- Induction: 1989

Katsuya Nomura (野村 克也, Nomura Katsuya; June 29, 1935 – February 11, 2020) was a Japanese Nippon Professional Baseball (NPB) catcher and manager. During his over 26-season playing career mostly spent with the Nankai Hawks (now the Fukuoka SoftBank Hawks), he became one of NPB's greatest offensive catchers. He was awarded the Pacific League MVP Award five times, became the first NPB batter to win the Triple Crown in 1965, and holds the record for second-most home runs and RBIs in NPB history.

Nomura was a player-manager for the last eight years he was with the Hawks, leading them to the Pacific League title in 1973. After playing, he became a full-time manager and led the Yakult Swallows to four league titles and three Japan Series championships from 1990 to 1998. Later, he managed the Hanshin Tigers for three seasons and the Tohoku Rakuten Golden Eagles for four seasons until his retirement in 2009. As a manager, Nomura recorded 1,565 wins, the fifth-most wins of any manager in NPB history. He was elected to the Japanese Baseball Hall of Fame in 1989.

Nomura famously detracted Shohei Ohtani, on multiple occasions. Nomura stated Ohtanis two-way approach and desire to play in the MLB, were disrespectful and shameful. Repeatedly stating these ideas on multiple occasions in the early NPB career of Ohtani. This is seen as a blemish on an otherwise historic résumé to many.

== Biography ==
=== Early life ===
Nomura was born in the coastal fishing village of Amino (now Kyōtango) in Kyoto Prefecture. When he was three years old, his father died of disease while serving in China during the Second Sino-Japanese War. Nomura grew up in poverty with his mother and older brother. With the help of his brother, he was able to attend high school.

=== Playing career ===
After graduating from Mineyama High School, Nomura joined the Nankai Hawks after a tryout in 1954. The team's manager at the time believed he'd at least be useful as a catcher for pitching practice. That year, Nomura played in nine games and went hitless for the season. The Hawks discussed cutting him from the team, however, he was given another chance reportedly after Nomura offered to play for free and even threatened to throw himself in front of a train if he was let go.

During a career that spanned four decades from 1954 to 1980, Nomura hit 657 home runs and led the Pacific League in homers eight straight seasons, utilizing the full potential of his home park Osaka Stadium, which had a home run wall just 276 feet down the line until 1972 that adjusted to 300 feet from that year onward (the distance to straightaway center was 380 feet). He was the first player to have 500 home runs in NPB history, doing so on 2 July 1971 off Satoru Miwa of the Nishitetsu Lions at Osaka Stadium. He finished his career with 2901 hits.

In 1965, Nomura won the league's first Triple Crown. He was a player-manager between 1970 and 1977. He played for 26 years, the longest NPB playing career until Kimiyasu Kudo pitched in his 27th season in 2008; Kudo retired in 2010 having played 29 seasons.

=== Managerial career ===
Nomura began his 24-year managerial career as player-manager of the Hawks in 1970. During his eight-year stint as Hawks manager, he led the team to the Pacific League title in 1973. After his playing career, Nomura went on to become a full-time manager. From 1990 to 1998, he managed the Yakult Swallows, leading them to four league titles and three Japan Series championships. During what became known as the "golden age of Yakult", Nomura became known for his theory of "ID baseball" based on the philosophy of "thinking baseball". Nomura mentored many talented players, including Tetsuya Iida, who became known as the "poster child for ID baseball", as well as the team's catcher, Atsuya Furuta, who became a hall of fame catcher in his own right.

Following his role as Yakult manager, Nomura joined the Hanshin Tigers and managed the team from 1999 to 2001. The team finished last in the Central League all three seasons. On December 5, 2001, his wife, television personality Sachiyo Nomura, was arrested for tax evasion. Nomura resigned from his managerial position the next day. His wife was accused of hiding ¥45 million of his income, however Nomura was not accused of any criminal responsibility.

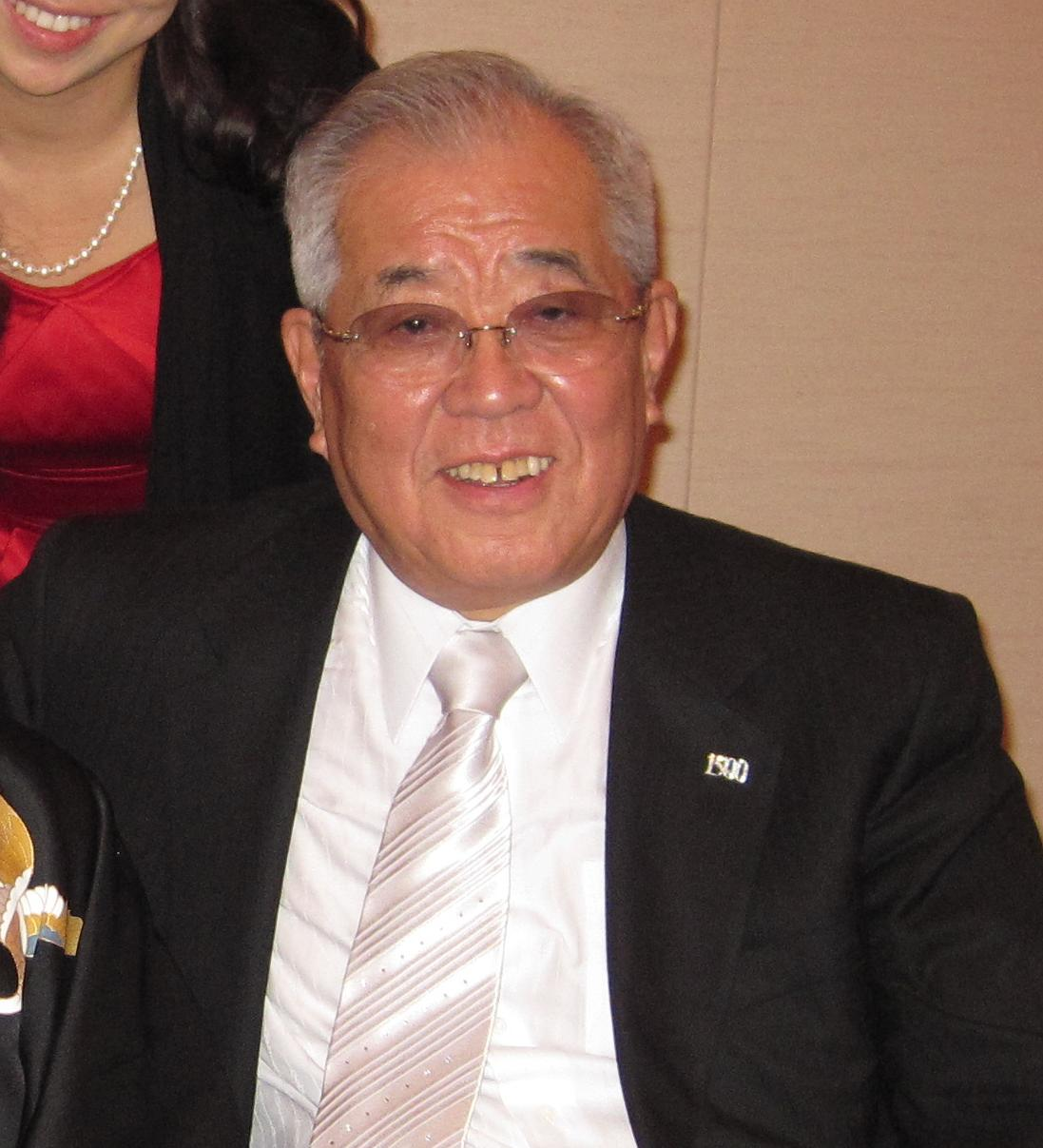
Nomura in 2010

After the scandal, Nomura managed the amateur corporate league team Shidax from 2003 to 2005. He left after three seasons to return to NPB. The Tohoku Rakuten Golden Eagles had a poor showing during their inaugural 2005 season. It was the first PL club in 40 years to lose at least 90 games in one season. They finished with a 38–97–1 record. Hoping to improve for their second season, the team hired Nomura to manage the club because of his experience. Over the next four season, he helped turn Rakuten around. By his final season with the team, the Eagles finished the regular season in with their best-ever showing up to that point in time, second place, securing them a position in the Climax Series. After losing in the final stage of the 2009 Pacific League Climax Series, Nomura retired from managing at the age of 74. As a manager, Nomura recorded 1,565 wins, the fifth-most wins of any manager in NPB history.

=== Legacy ===
During his playing time, Pacific League games were rarely televised. Because of this, Nomura was often overshadowed by his Central League contemporaries such as superstars Sadaharu Oh and Shigeo Nagashima of the Yomiuri Giants. He openly resented this and felt he never received the attention that he deserved as a player. Over his 26-season playing career, however, Nomura amassed a number of awards, titles and records. During his time with the Hawks, he won five Pacific League MVP Awards – the most of any PL player and second-most all-time. Nomura also led the PL in home runs for nine seasons, eight of which were consecutive and won 19 Best Nine Awards for best catcher in the league. He accumulated 657 home runs, 1,988 RBIs and 2,901 hits in 3,017 games, all of which are 2nd in the all-time rankings. He was elected into the Japanese Baseball Hall of Fame by the Selection Committee for Players in 1989.; his copper plaque depicts him wearing his cap backwards with no team logo visible.

== Personal life ==
While married to his first wife from 1960, Nomura started dating Sachiyo in 1971 and cohabiting in 1972. Soon she became pregnant and gave birth to future NPB player Katsunori Nomura in 1973. Nomura eventually remarried her after he divorced his first wife in 1978. The two remained married until her death in 2017 at age 85. His first wife died of Subarachnoid hemorrhage in 1982. Sports agents Kenny and Don Nomura, Sachiyo's children from her previous marriage, are Nomura's step-children. Nomura died of heart failure on February 11, 2020, at age 84.

== See also ==
- List of top Nippon Professional Baseball home run hitters
- List of Nippon Professional Baseball players with 1,000 runs batted in
- List of Nippon Professional Baseball career hits leaders

Sporting positions
Preceded by Yasushi Tao	Tohoku Rakuten Golden Eagles manager 2006–2009	Succeeded by Marty Brown
