= Kazuhiro Yamauchi =

Japanese baseball player and manager (1932–2009)

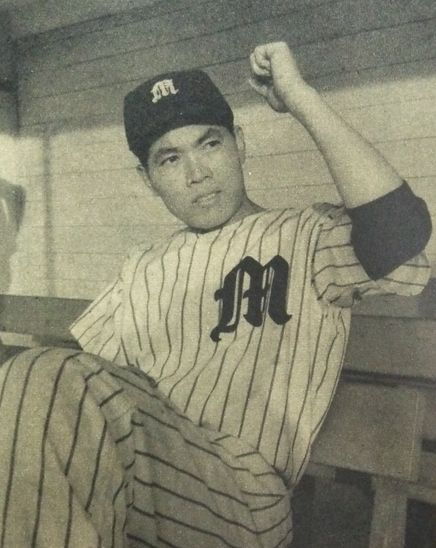
- Yamauchi in 1956
- Outfielder
- Born: May 1, 1932; Ichinomiya, Aichi, Japan
- Died: February 2, 2009 (aged 76); Tokyo, Japan
- Batted: Right Threw: Right

debut
- 1952, for the Mainichi Orions

Last appearance
- 1970, for the Hiroshima Toyo Carp

Career statistics
- Batting average: .295
- Home runs: 396
- Hits: 2,271
- RBI: 1,286
- Stolen bases: 118

Teams
- As player: Mainichi Orions/Mainichi Daimai Orions (1952 – 1963); Hanshin Tigers (1964 – 1967); Hiroshima Toyo Carp (1968 – 1970); As manager/coach: Yomiuri Giants (1971 – 1974); Hanshin Tigers (1975 – 1977); Lotte Orions (1979 – 1981); Chunichi Dragons (1984 – 1986); Yomiuri Giants (1987 – 1989); Orix BlueWave (1991 – 1993); Hanshin Tigers (1995); Yakult Swallows (1996); Koos Group Whales (1998 – 1999)

Career highlights and awards
- 1960 Pacific League MVP; Meikyukai, 1978

Member of the Japanese

Baseball Hall of Fame
- Induction: 2002
- Election method: Competitors Award

Kazuhiro Yamauchi (山内 一弘, Yamauchi Kazuhiro; May 1, 1932 – February 2, 2009) was a Japanese baseball player and manager. He played for the Mainichi Orions, the Hanshin Tigers and the Hiroshima Toyo Carp over the span of an 18 season-long career (1952–1970).

Yamauchi was the first Japanese professional baseball player to hit 300 home runs, achieving that feat on July 4, 1963. Some of his career stats include 7,702 at bats, 1,218 runs, 2,271 hits, 396 home runs, 1,286 runs batted in, 118 stolen bases, 1,061 walks, and a batting average of .292.

After retiring as a player in 1970, he went on to become an NPB manager and coach for nearly 30 years.

He was a founding member of the Meikyukai ("The Golden Players Club") in 1978, and was inducted into the Japanese Baseball Hall of Fame in 2002.

Yamauchi died of liver failure in a Tokyo hospital on February 2, 2009. He was 76.

== See also ==
- List of top Nippon Professional Baseball home run hitters
- List of Nippon Professional Baseball players with 1,000 runs batted in
- List of Nippon Professional Baseball career hits leaders
