= Sadaharu Oh =

Chinese-Japanese baseball player and manager (born 1940)

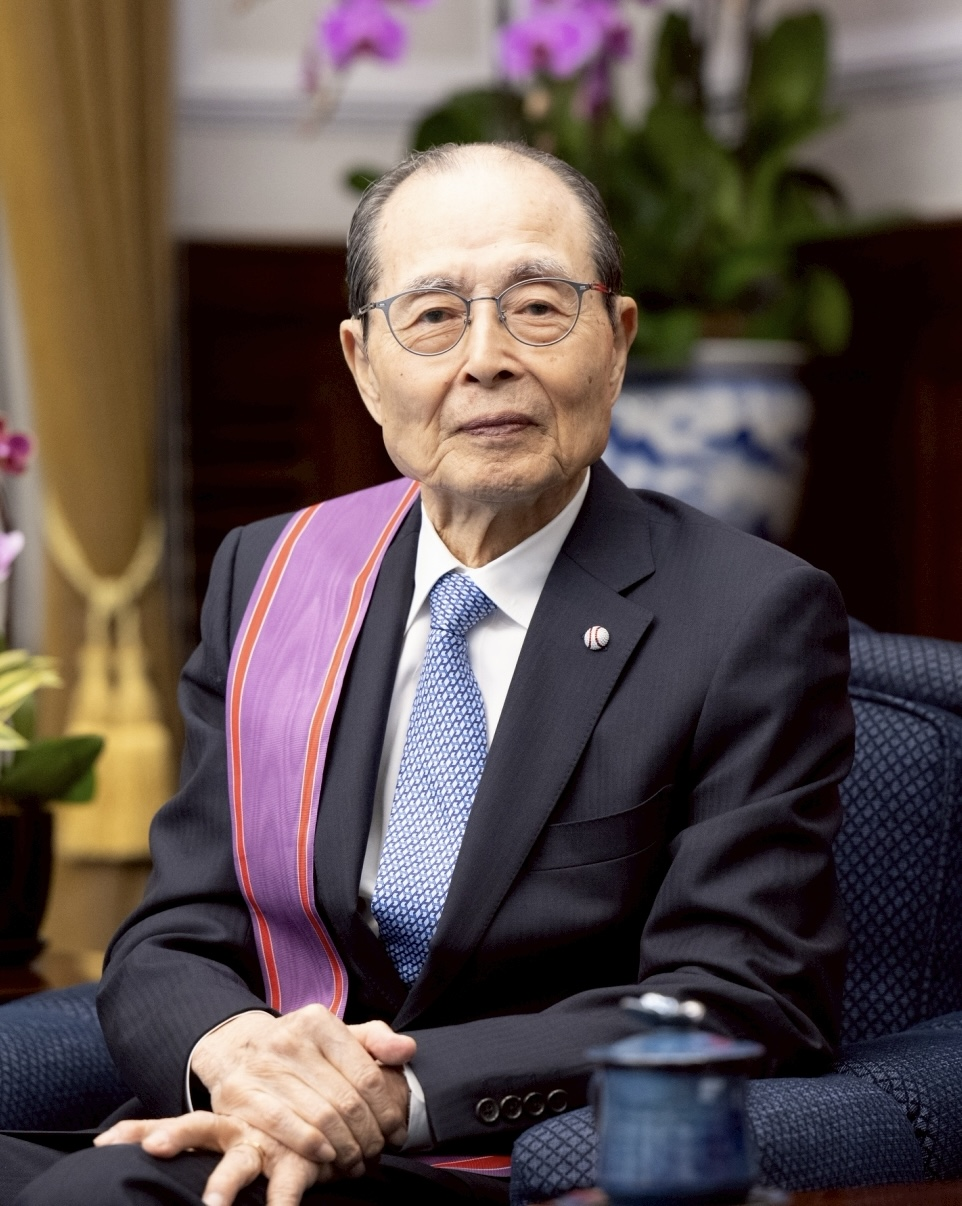
- Sadaharu Oh in 2026
- First baseman / Manager
- Born: May 20, 1940 (age 86); Sumida, Tokyo, Japan
- Batted: Left Threw: Left

NPB debut
- April 11, 1959, for the Yomiuri Giants

Last appearance
- October 12, 1980, for the Yomiuri Giants

NPB statistics
- Batting average: .301
- Hits: 2,786
- Home runs: 868
- Runs batted in: 2,170
- Stolen bases: 84

Teams
- As player: Yomiuri Giants (1959–1980); As manager: Yomiuri Giants (1984–1988); Fukuoka Daiei Hawks • Fukuoka SoftBank Hawks (1995–2008); As executive: Fukuoka SoftBank Hawks (2009–present)

Career highlights and awards
- As player: 11× Japan Series champion (1961, 1963, 1965–1973); 9× Central League MVP (1964, 1965, 1967, 1969, 1970, 1973, 1974, 1976, 1977); 18× Best Nine Award (1962–1979); 2× Triple Crown (1973, 1974); 3× Japan Professional Sports Grand Prize (1974, 1976, 1977); Hit for the cycle on April 25, 1963; Yomiuri Giants #1 retired; As manager: 2× Japan Series champion (1999, 2003); Fukuoka Daiei/SoftBank Hawks #89 honored; As executive: 9× Japan Series champion (2011, 2014, 2015, 2017–2020, 2025, 2026); NPB/World records: 868 career home runs (World record); 1.079 career OPS (Japanese record); 2,170 career runs batted in (Japanese record)

Member of the Japanese

Baseball Hall of Fame
- Induction: 1994

Wang Chen-chih Sadaharu Ō
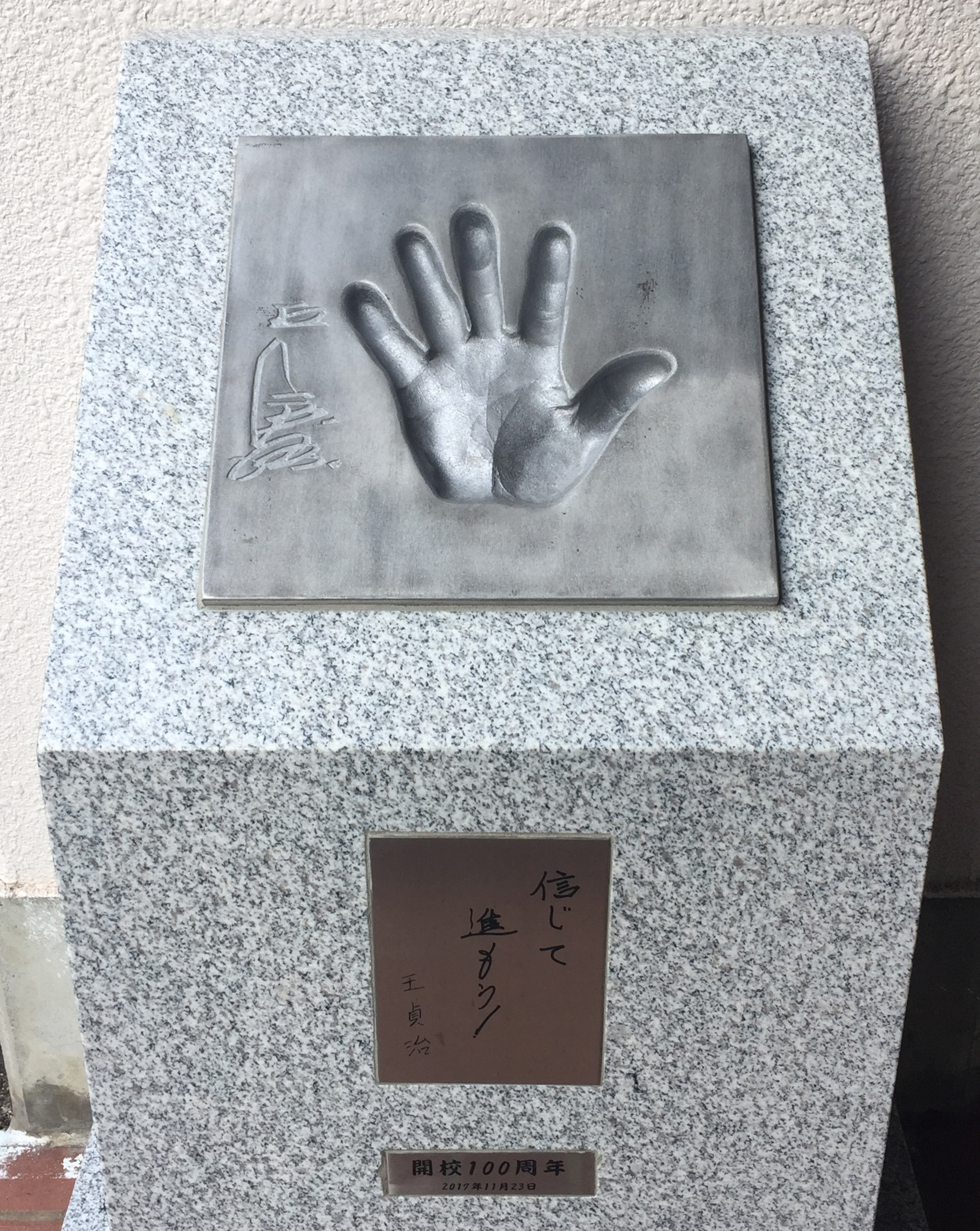
- Hand print of Sadaharu Oh

Chinese name
- Traditional Chinese: 王貞治
- Simplified Chinese: 王贞治
Transcriptions
Standard Mandarin
- Hanyu Pinyin: Wáng Zhēnzhì
- Bopomofo: ㄨㄤˊ ㄓㄣㄓˋ
- Gwoyeu Romatzyh: Wang Jenjyh
- Tongyong Pinyin: Wang^{2} Chên^{1}-chih^{4}

Japanese name
- Kanji: 王 貞治
- Kana: おう さだはる
Transcriptions
- Romanization: Ō Sadaharu

Sadaharu Oh (Japanese: 王貞治, Ō Sadaharu; born May 20, 1940), also known as Wang Chen-chih (simplified Chinese: 王贞治; traditional Chinese: 王貞治; pinyin: Wáng Zhēnzhì), is a Chinese-Japanese former professional baseball player and manager who is currently the chairman of the Fukuoka SoftBank Hawks of Nippon Professional Baseball (NPB). Oh played for 22 consecutive seasons, all of them for the Yomiuri Giants. He holds the world career home run record at 868, over 100 more than MLB record holder Barry Bonds.

Oh batted and threw left-handed and primarily played first base. Originally signed with the powerhouse Giants in 1959 as a pitcher, Oh was soon converted to a full-time hitter. Under the tutelage of coach Hiroshi Arakawa, Oh developed his distinctive "flamingo" leg kick. It took Oh three years to blossom, but he went on to dominate Nippon Professional Baseball. He was a 15-time home run champion and was named to the Central League All-Star team 18 times. More than just a power hitter, Oh was a five-time batting champion and won the Japanese Central League's batting triple crown twice. With Oh at first base, the Yomiuri Giants won 11 Japan Series championships, including 9 in a row from 1965 to 1973. Oh was named the Central League's Most Valuable Player nine times, including having the rare honor of winning Central League MVP while not on the team that won the season's pennant, which he did twice, in 1964 by virtue of breaking NPB's single season home run record with 55 home runs, a record that would stand until 2013 when Wladimir Balentien set a new record with 60 home runs that season, and 1974, when he earned his second batting Triple Crown in a row. Oh and Balentien are the only Central League players to win the Central League MVP while not on the pennant winning team the years that they won MVP.

In addition to the world career home run record, Oh set many other NPB batting records, including runs batted in (RBI) (2,170), slugging percentage (.634), bases on balls (2,390), and on-base plus slugging percentage (OPS) (1.080). In 1977, Oh became the first recipient of the People's Honour Award, and he became the second baseball player to receive the Order of Culture in 2025. He was inducted into the Japanese Baseball Hall of Fame in 1994.

After retiring as a player, Oh served as the Giants' manager from 1984 to 1988. He also managed the Fukuoka Daiei/Fukuoka SoftBank Hawks from 1995 to 2008. He was the manager of the Japanese national team in the inaugural World Baseball Classic, which defeated Cuba for the championship. He is currently the chairman of the Hawks.

== Early life ==
Oh was born in Sumida, Tokyo, as the fifth of six children (four daughters and two sons) of a Japanese mother Tomi Oh 王登美 (née Tozumi 當住) and a Chinese father Shifuku Oh (王仕福 Wáng Shìfú from Qingtian County, Zhejiang. His older twin sister died when they were 15 months old, and his younger sister died shortly after she was born, He was eventually raised as the youngest of four remaining children. Although born in Japan, Oh is a citizen of the Republic of China (ROC), as his father had left for Japan when the Republic still governed mainland China and chose to retain his ROC (i.e. Taiwanese) citizenship.

== Playing career ==
=== Prep career ===
Oh made his high school team, and, in 1957, Waseda Jitsugyo High School made it to the Spring Koshien Tournament with the second-year Oh as its ace pitcher. Before the tournament started, Oh suffered serious blisters on two fingers of his pitching hand. Oh pitched the entire first game at Koshien and his team won. The next day, Oh pitched another complete game and earned the victory, but the blisters worsened. Oh faced the prospect of pitching two more games on consecutive days for the championship with injuries. Oh pitched and won another complete game, enduring the pain.

Oh was able to just make it through his fourth complete game in four days, squeaking out a one-run victory. Oh won the championship, though was not allowed to play in the Kokutai due to being Chinese.

=== Professional career ===
In 1959, he signed his first professional contract as a pitcher for the Yomiuri Giants. However, Oh was not a strong enough pitcher to succeed professionally, and soon switched to first base, working diligently with coach Hiroshi Arakawa to improve his hitting skills. This led to the development of Oh's distinctive "flamingo" leg kick. His batting average jumped from .161 in his rookie season to .270 in 1960, and his home runs more than doubled. His performance dipped slightly in both statistical categories in 1961, but Oh truly blossomed in 1962, when he hit 38 home runs.

In 1964, Oh hit 55 home runs, a single-season record he owned for 37 years until it was tied by Tuffy Rhodes in 2001. Oh surpassed 50 home runs in a season two other times, in 1973 and 1977.

Oh became friends with Hank Aaron, his contemporary in Major League Baseball. The two squared off in a home run derby before an exhibition game at Korakuen Stadium on 2 November 1974, after Aaron eclipsed Babe Ruth's home run record. By that time, Oh was running away with the Japanese home run record, having become the first Japanese baseball player to hit 600 career home runs that year. Aaron won, 10–9.

His hitting exploits benefited from the fact that for most of his career he batted third in the Giants' lineup, with another very dangerous hitter, Shigeo Nagashima, batting fourth; the two players forming the feared "O-N Cannon". In his autobiography, Sadaharu Oh: A Zen Way of Baseball (ISBN 978-0812911091), Oh said he and Nagashima were not close, rarely spending time together off the field. Between the two, they combined for 35 Best Nine Award selections, with Oh being named to the Central League team for eighteen consecutive seasons.

Sadaharu Oh retired in 1980 at age 40, having amassed 2,786 hits (third after Isao Harimoto (Jang Hoon) and Katsuya Nomura), 2,170 RBIs, a lifetime batting average of .301, and 868 home runs.

== Managing career ==
Sadaharu Oh was the assistant manager of the Yomiuri Giants between 1981 and 1983, serving as the second in command to new manager and fellow Giants legend Motoshi Fujita. He became the manager of the Yomiuri Giants between 1984 and 1988. He led the Giants to one Central League pennant in 1987. He was asked to retire as Giants manager after the 1988 season, as Fujita returned to manage the Giants for four seasons after Oh stepped down.

In 1995, he returned to baseball as the manager of the Fukuoka Daiei Hawks (later the Fukuoka SoftBank Hawks). Oh led the Hawks to three Pacific League pennants in 1999, 2000 and 2003, and two Japan Series titles in 1999 and 2003.

In 2006, Oh managed the Japan national baseball team, winning the championship in the inaugural 2006 World Baseball Classic over Cuba.

On July 5, 2006, Oh announced that he was taking an indefinite leave of absence from the Hawks to combat a stomach tumor. On July 17, 2006, Oh underwent laparoscopic surgery to remove his stomach and its surrounding lymph nodes. The surgery was considered to be a success. Although the tumor was confirmed to be cancerous, it was caught in early stages. He returned to coaching the Fukuoka SoftBank Hawks, although he announced he would retire at the end of the 2008 season as manager, stepping into a front office role for the Hawks, which he has held ever since.

== Home run record controversy ==
On three occasions, foreign-born players challenged Oh's single-season home run record of 55 and faced Oh-managed teams late in the season. On each occasion, Oh's pitchers refused to throw strikes to them.

In 1985, American Randy Bass, playing for the Hanshin Tigers, came into the last game of the season against the Oh-managed Giants with 54 home runs. Bass was intentionally walked four times on four straight pitches each time. Bass reached over the plate on the fifth occasion and batted the ball into the outfield for a single. After the game, Oh denied ordering his pitchers to walk Bass, but Keith Comstock, an American pitcher for the Giants, later stated that Giants coach and former Giant Tsuneo Horiuchi had threatened a fine of $1,000 for every strike that any Giants pitcher threw to Bass. The magazine Takarajima investigated the incident and reported that the Giants front office had likely ordered the team not to allow Bass an opportunity to tie or break Oh's record, likely because ace Suguru Egawa went against this and pitched strikes to Bass anyway. For the most part, the Japanese media remained silent on the incident, as did league commissioner Takeso Shimoda.

In 2001, American Karl "Tuffy" Rhodes, playing for the Osaka Kintetsu Buffaloes, hit 55 home runs with several games left. The Buffaloes played the Oh-managed Fukuoka Daiei Hawks on a late weekend series in Fukuoka. Rhodes was intentionally walked during each plate appearance. Hawks catcher Kenji Johjima could be seen grinning as he caught the intentional balls. Again, Oh denied any involvement and Hawks pitching coach Yoshiharu Wakana stated that the pitchers acted on his orders, saying, "I just didn't want a foreign player to break Oh's record." Rhodes completed the season with 55 home runs. Hawks pitcher Keisaburo Tanoue went on record saying that he wanted to throw strikes to Rhodes and felt bad about the situation.

In 2002, Venezuelan Alex Cabrera hit 55 home runs with five games left in the season and his team played Oh's Hawks. Oh told his pitchers to throw strikes to Cabrera, but most of them ignored his order and threw balls well away from the plate. This was also due to the fact Cabrera was walked by other teams in 2002, and could have been respect for Oh and concern that Cabrera was using performance-enhancing drugs (Cabrera had been mailed a package in 2000, while playing for the Arizona Diamondbacks, containing Winstrol pills and was later named in the Mitchell Report but denied using drugs). After the game, Oh stated, "If you're going to break the record, you should do it by more than one. Do it by a lot." In the wake of the walks to Cabrera, ESPN's Jeff Merron called Oh's single-season home run record a "phony record". Cabrera called the situation "racist".

Curaçaoan Wladimir Balentien broke Oh's single-season home run record on September 15, 2013, by hitting his 56th and 57th home runs of the season in a game against the Hanshin Tigers. Balentien ended that season with 60 home runs.

== Personal life ==
Oh was married to Kyoko Oh (王恭子, Ō Kyōko), and had three daughters with her. She died of stomach cancer, the same disease he had in 2006, in December 2001 at age 57. Their second daughter, Rie (born in 1970), is a sportscaster and presenter on the J-Wave radio network.

== In popular culture ==
- Oh is mentioned in the Beastie Boys song "Hey Ladies": "I got more hits than Sadaharu Oh."
- Oh is Mentioned in A Different World season 2 episode 20, "No means No".
- A character in the manga series Kinnikuman is named after Sadaharu Oh.
- Oh is mentioned in the manga series Hajime no Ippo.
- Oh is mentioned in the 1979 movie The Bad News Bears Go to Japan.
- The character Nigel Tufnel wears an Oh jersey on stage in the last scene of "This Is Spinal Tap".

== Miscellaneous ==
- In 1988, Oh and Hank Aaron created the World Children's Baseball Fair (WCBF), to increase the popularity of baseball by working with youngsters.
- On December 4, 2007, Oh said in Chiyoda, Tokyo that it is just a matter of time before his career record of 868 home runs will be broken: "I think the 868 record will be broken. There's nobody near that mark in Japan, but I think Alex Rodriguez can do it", he added. "He has the ability to hit 1,000." (Rodriguez retired seven years later, at the age of 41, with 696 home runs.)
- In 2002 and 2005, he was named by Taiwanese President Chen Shui-bian as Ambassador-at-Large.
- Taiwanese President Ma Ying-jeou honored Sadaharu Oh with the Order of Brilliant Star on February 5, 2009, in Taipei. Oh called receiving the award, "The highest honor of his life."
- During the 2020 Summer Olympics in Tokyo (which took place in 2021 due to the COVID-19 pandemic), he was a part of a group that carried the torch in the stadium.
- On October 17, 2025, he was awarded the Order of Culture, becoming the second professional baseball player to receive the honor after Shigeo Nagashima.
- On February 26, 2026, Taiwanese President Lai Ching-te awarded Sadaharu Oh the Order of Brilliant Star with Special Grand Cordon. Oh stated he was "moved beyond words" to receive the award.

== Statistics ==
Year	Team	Number	G	AB	R	H	2B	3B	HR	TB	RBI	SB	CS	SH	SF	BB	IBB	HBP	K	DP	AVG	OBP	SLG	OPS
1959	Yomiuri Giants	1	94	193	18	31	7	1	7	61	25	3	1	1	1	24	1	3	72	2	.161	.262	.316	.569
1960	Yomiuri Giants	1	130	426	49	115	19	3	17	191	71	5	4	3	1	67	5	5	101	7	.270	.375	.448	.823
1961	Yomiuri Giants	1	127	396	50	100	25	6	13	176	53	10	5	4	4	64	3	3	72	7	.253	.358	.444	.802
1962	Yomiuri Giants	1	134	497	79	135	28	2	38	281	85	6	4	3	2	72	9	12	99	6	.272	.376	.565	.941
1963	Yomiuri Giants	1	140	478	111	146	30	5	40	306	106	9	5	0	2	123	12	6	64	7	.305	.452	.640	1.092
1964	Yomiuri Giants	1	140	472	110	151	24	0	55	340	119	6	4	0	5	119	20	3	81	8	.320	.456	.720	1.176
1965	Yomiuri Giants	1	135	428	104	138	19	1	42	285	104	2	4	0	3	138	29	6	58	7	.322	.490	.666	1.156
1966	Yomiuri Giants	1	129	396	111	123	14	1	48	283	116	9	4	0	4	142	41	7	51	5	.311	.495	.715	1.210
1967	Yomiuri Giants	1	133	426	94	139	22	3	47	308	108	3	5	0	3	130	30	7	65	7	.326	.488	.723	1.211
1968	Yomiuri Giants	1	131	442	107	144	28	0	49	319	119	5	1	1	6	121	18	10	72	5	.326	.475	.722	1.197
1969	Yomiuri Giants	1	130	452	112	156	24	0	44	312	103	5	2	0	8	111	12	5	61	7	.345	.472	.690	1.162
1970	Yomiuri Giants	1	129	425	97	138	24	0	47	303	93	1	4	0	3	119	24	6	48	8	.325	.476	.713	1.189
1971	Yomiuri Giants	1	130	434	92	120	18	2	39	259	101	8	2	0	5	121	17	5	65	8	.276	.435	.597	1.032
1972	Yomiuri Giants	1	130	456	104	135	19	0	48	298	120	2	0	0	2	108	18	6	43	8	.296	.435	.654	1.089
1973	Yomiuri Giants	1	130	428	111	152	18	0	51	323	114	2	1	0	4	124	38	4	41	7	.355	.500	.755	1.255
1974	Yomiuri Giants	1	130	385	105	128	18	0	49	293	107	1	5	0	2	158	45	8	44	4	.332	.532	.761	1.293
1975	Yomiuri Giants	1	128	393	77	112	14	0	33	225	96	1	0	0	6	123	27	1	62	9	.285	.451	.573	1.024
1976	Yomiuri Giants	1	122	400	99	130	11	1	49	290	123	3	1	0	9	125	27	2	45	8	.325	.479	.725	1.204
1977	Yomiuri Giants	1	130	432	114	140	15	0	50	305	124	1	3	0	6	126	16	6	37	14	.324	.477	.706	1.183
1978	Yomiuri Giants	1	130	440	91	132	20	0	39	269	118	1	2	0	11	114	17	1	43	7	.300	.436	.611	1.048
1979	Yomiuri Giants	1	120	407	73	116	15	0	33	230	81	1	1	0	5	89	10	5	48	9	.285	.415	.565	.980
1980	Yomiuri Giants	1	129	476	59	105	10	0	30	205	84	0	1	0	8	72	8	3	47	9	.236	.342	.462	.803
Total			2831	9250	1967	2786	422	25	868	5862	2170	84	59	12	100	2390	427	114	1319	159	.301	.446	.634	1.080

== See also ==
- List of top Nippon Professional Baseball home run hitters
- List of Nippon Professional Baseball players with 1,000 runs batted in
- List of Nippon Professional Baseball career hits leaders
