= Isao Harimoto =

Japanese baseball player (1940–2026)

Isao Harimoto 張本 勲
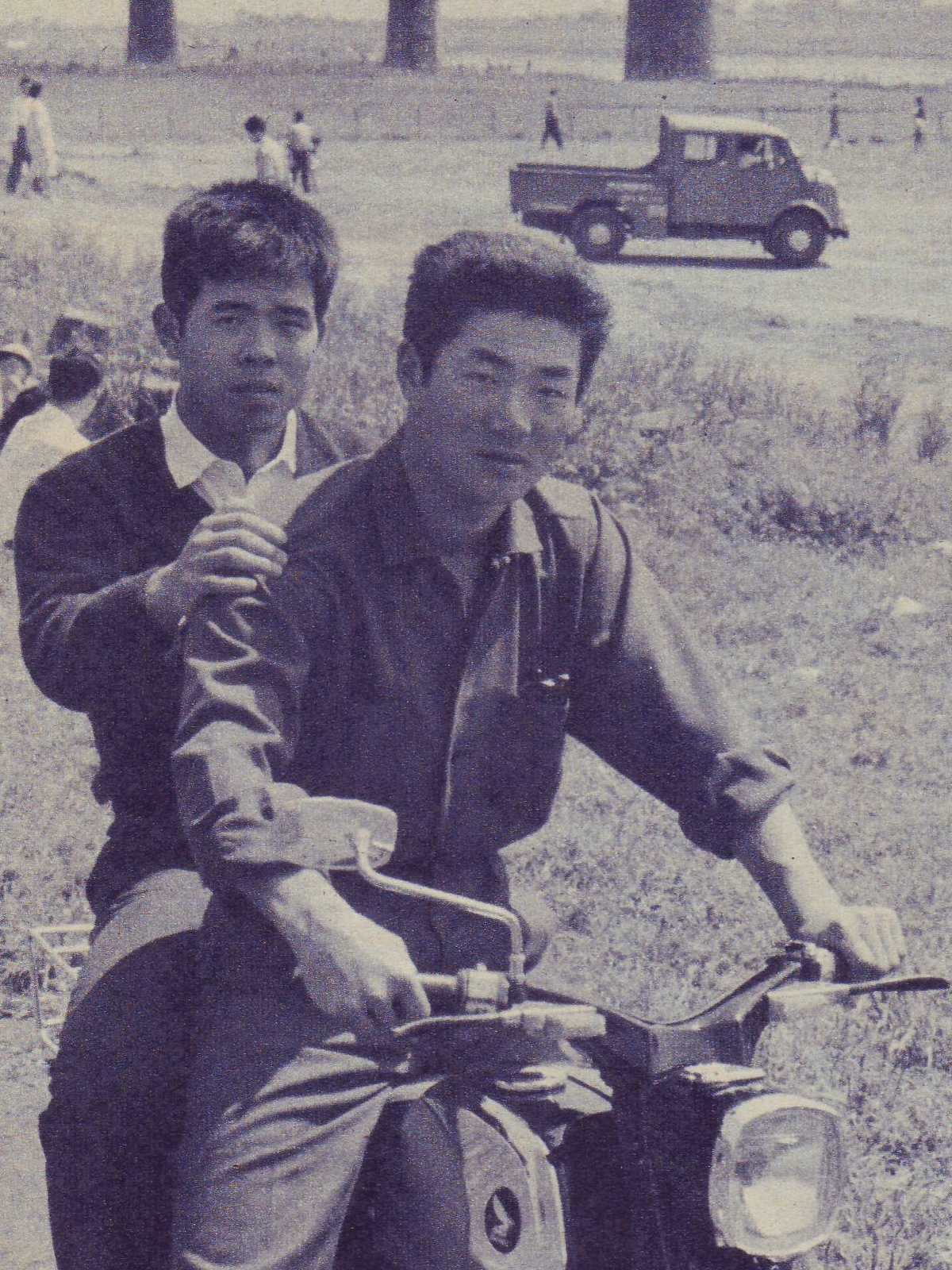
- Harimoto (front) with Kimio Takagi in 1959
- Outfielder
- Born: Jang Hun (장훈); June 19, 1940; Hiroshima, Japan
- Died: September 9, 2026 (aged 86); Tokyo, Japan
- Batted: Left Threw: Left

NPB debut
- April 10, 1959, for the Toei Flyers

Last NPB appearance
- October 10, 1981, for the Lotte Orions

NPB statistics
- Batting average: .319
- Home runs: 504
- Hits: 3,085
- Runs batted in: 1,676
- Runs: 1,523
- Stolen bases: 319
- Stats at Baseball Reference

Teams
- Toei Flyers/Nittaku Home Flyers/Nippon-Ham Fighters (1959–1975); Yomiuri Giants (1976–1979); Lotte Orions (1980–1981)

Career highlights and awards
- Pacific League Rookie of the Year (1959); Pacific League MVP (1962); Japan Series champion (1962); 18× All-Star selection (1960–1964, 1966–1978); 16× Best Nine Award winner (1960–1970, 1972‍–‍1974, 1976, 1977); 7× Pacific League batting champion (1961, 1967–1970, 1972, 1974); Hit for the cycle on May 7, 1961; NPB record – 3,085 career hits

Member of the Japanese

Baseball Hall of Fame
- Induction: 1990

Isao Harimoto (張本 勲, Harimoto Isao; June 19, 1940 – September 9, 2026) was a Japanese Nippon Professional Baseball player. Over his 23-season playing career in Nippon Professional Baseball, Harimoto played for the Toei Flyers/Nittaku Home Flyers/Nippon-Ham Fighters, the Yomiuri Giants and the Lotte Orions. He is the holder of the record for most hits in the Japanese professional leagues. An ethnic Korean, his birth name was Jang Hun (Korean: 장훈; Hanja: 張勳). Harimoto spent his life as a resident of Japan and adopted a Japanese name, but remained a Korean citizen, thus making him a Zainichi Korean for many years.

An accident from youth forced Harimoto into becoming a left-hander, and when he became interested in baseball, he dedicated himself to adjust to playing the field and batting that resulted in him making the majors in 1959. As a rookie, he batted .275 in 125 games with 115 hits on his way to being named the Pacific League Rookie of the Year. His career furthered the following season, where he earned his first All-Star selection and Best Nine Award. In the entire decade of the 1960s, he was named among the Best Nine in every season. He won the batting title in 1961, batting .336 while collecting 159 hits and 24 home runs. He had the first of his four 30-HR seasons in 1962, which saw the Flyers win their first ever Pacific League pennant along him winning the league MVP Award. The Flyers won their first Japan Series that year in seven games for what ended up being Harimoto's first and only championship.

Harimoto would continue to rack up All-Star selections and batting championships for the team, which included seven total batting championships from 1961 to 1974 before he was traded in 1975 to the Yomiuri Giants. He was named to the Best Nine two further times with the Giants, with his 16th and final one occurring in 1977 at the age of 37. He departed the team for the Lotte Orions in 1980 on the precipice of Japanese history. That season, he became the first player in Japanese baseball history with 3,000 career hits, doing so in May. He later hit his 500th career home run that year to become the first Japanese player with 500 home runs and 300 stolen bases. One of the most well-rounded hitters in NPB history, in 23 seasons of play, he had sixteen 20-HR seasons along with five seasons of at least 20 stolen bases while batting .300 in sixteen different seasons. He was inducted into the Japanese Baseball Hall of Fame in 1990 and during his post-playing career worked as a television baseball analyst.

== Personal background ==
Harimoto's family relocated to Japan from Korea for better economic opportunities shortly before he was born, while the Korean Peninsula was under Japanese colonial rule, and settled in Hiroshima. At the age of four, he was playing outside near a fire built to warm the air at night when a truck started to back up in his path. In his attempt to avoid the truck, his right hand touched the flames and left him with severe burns that limited the mobility in his thumb and forefinger while making the middle three fingers scarred and effectively without use, frozen into a curled position. This forced him to become a left-handed thrower and hitter, and to use a custom glove that fit over his damaged hand while still allowing him to catch the ball. The scarred fingers were bent in such a way that a baseball bat could be slid between them. Harimoto spoke of practicing swinging the bat as a child with only his right hand, trying to strengthen the injured limb to make it useful.

He would survive the release of an atomic bomb over Hiroshima on August 6, 1945, and has been identified as the only survivor of the bombing to play professional baseball in Japan. He survived without injuries because the family home was located in the shadow of a mountain and shielded from the blast, but lost a sister who was in the blast zone. Later in life, he would become a member of the Japanese Hibakusha movement, a project dedicated to outlawing global nuclear weaponry, and gaining compensation for victims of their use.

In December 2024, Harimoto revealed in an interview with Sankei Shimbun that he had received his Japanese citizenship several years prior.

== Baseball career ==
Harimoto began his professional career with the Toei Flyers in 1959, when he was selected as rookie of the year. He was a dangerous hitter who combined both power and speed. His 3,085 career hits are the Nippon Professional Baseball record. Among Japanese-born players, Ichiro Suzuki passed Harimoto's hit total in 2009 based on his combined career in Japan and the American major leagues. Harimoto remains the only player to accumulate more than 3000 in Japan, a mark he reached with a home run on May 28, 1980, while playing for the Lotte Orions. After reaching this milestone, Harimoto was awarded the South Korean Order of Sport Merit Maengho Medal (국민훈장 맹호장; Maengho, literally Fierce Tiger), a prize for excellence in sports.

With 504 career home runs, Harimoto ranks seventh on the list of all-time leaders in Japan. After joining the Yomiuri Giants in 1976, he hit behind Sadaharu Oh in the lineup and was on deck when Oh hit his 756th home run to pass Hank Aaron's mark in the United States. Harimoto's 319 stolen bases gives him an unusual combination of 3,000 hits, 500 home runs, and 300 stolen bases, a set of milestones reached only by Willie Mays and Alex Rodriguez in the U.S. major leagues. His record for most combined hits by a Japanese player was not eclipsed until Ichiro Suzuki passed him in 2009; Harimoto noted at the time that he believed Suzuki had good potential to eclipse him as early as 1996 (after Ichiro had collected 210 hits as a rookie).

== Post-playing career ==
Following his retirement as a player, Harimoto mainly worked for Tokyo Broadcasting System (TBS) as a baseball commentator. He appeared on a news program named Sunday Morning and commented on baseball and other sports.

Harimoto died at a hospital in Tokyo, on September 9, 2026, at the age of 86.

== See also ==
- List of Nippon Professional Baseball career hits leaders
- List of top Nippon Professional Baseball home run hitters
- List of Nippon Professional Baseball players with 1,000 runs batted in
