= Mitsui Golden Glove Award =

Japanese baseball award for fielders

The Mitsui Golden Glove Award, sponsored by Japan's Mitsui Group, is an annual award for the best fielders in Japan's professional baseball leagues by the Nippon Professional Baseball Association. It is awarded to nine fielders. The players are selected based on votes by TV, radio, and newspaper journalists with over 5 years experience covering Japanese professional baseball. The trophy is accompanied by prize money.

The awards were first given out in 1972. Criteria for voting for players in the infield and outfield include playing more than half of the games (71) for a team at a certain position while pitchers are required to pitch more than the required amount of pitches to appear or appear in more than a third of games (47).

== See also ==
- Nippon Professional Baseball § Awards
- Baseball awards § Japan
- List of Nippon Professional Baseball ERA champions
- Major League Baseball Gold Glove Award
