= 1967 Nippon Professional Baseball season =

1967 NPB season
- League: Nippon Professional Baseball
- Sport: Baseball
- Duration: 10:0):00

Central League pennant
- League champions: Yomiuri Giants
- Runners-up: Chunichi Dragons
- Season MVP: Sadaharu Oh (YOM)

Pacific League pennant
- League champions: Hankyu Braves
- Runners-up: Nishitetsu Lions
- Season MVP: Mitsuhiro Adachi (HAN)

Japan Series
- Champions: Yomiuri Giants
- Runners-up: Hankyu Braves
- Finals MVP: Masahiko Mori (YOM)

NPB seasons
- ← 1966 1968 →

The 1967 Nippon Professional Baseball season was the 18th season of operation of Nippon Professional Baseball (NPB).

== Regular season ==
=== Standings ===
Central League regular season standings
Team	G	W	L	T	Pct.	GB
Yomiuri Giants	134	84	46	4	.646	—
Chunichi Dragons	134	72	58	4	.554	12.0
Hanshin Tigers	136	70	60	6	.538	14.0
Taiyo Whales	135	59	71	5	.454	25.0
Sankei Atoms	135	58	72	5	.446	26.0
Hiroshima Carp	138	47	83	8	.362	37.0

Pacific League regular season standings
Team	G	W	L	T	Pct.	GB
Hankyu Braves	134	75	55	4	.577	—
Nishitetsu Lions	140	66	64	10	.508	9.0
Toei Flyers	134	65	65	4	.500	10.0
Nankai Hawks	133	64	66	3	.492	11.0
Tokyo Orions	137	61	69	7	.469	14.0
Kintetsu Buffaloes	132	59	71	2	.454	16.0

== League leaders ==
=== Central League ===
Batting leaders
Stat	Player	Team	Total
Batting average	Toshio Naka	Chunichi	.343
Home runs	Sadaharu Oh	Yomiuri	47
Runs batted in	Sadaharu Oh	Yomiuri	108
Runs	Sadaharu Oh	Yomiuri	94
Hits	Taira Fujita	Hanshin	154
Stolen bases	Isao Shibata	Yomiuri	70

Pitching leaders
Stat	Player	Team	Total
Wins	Kentaro Ogawa	Chunichi	29
Losses	Shiroku Ishito	Sankei	18
Earned run average	Masatoshi Gondo	Hanshin	1.40
Strikeouts	Yutaka Enatsu	Hanshin	225
Innings pitched	Kentaro Ogawa	Chunichi	279 2/3

=== Pacific League ===
Batting leaders
Stat	Player	Team	Total
Batting average	Isao Harimoto	Toei	.336
Home runs	Katsuya Nomura	Nankai	35
Runs batted in	Katsuya Nomura	Nankai	100
Runs	Gordon Windhorn	Hankyu	78
Hits	Masahiro Doi	Kintetsu	147
Stolen bases	Takayuki Nishida	Tokyo	32

Pitching leaders
Stat	Player	Team	Total
Wins	Masaaki Ikenaga	Nishitetsu	23
Losses	Katsuji Sakai; Taisuke Watanabe	Tokyo; Nankai	18
Earned run average	Mitsuhiro Adachi	Hankyu Braves	1.75
Strikeouts	Keishi Suzuki	Kintetsu	222
Innings pitched	Masaaki Ikenaga	Nishitetsu	335 1/3

== Awards ==
- Most Valuable Player
  - Sadaharu Oh, Yomiuri Giants (CL)
  - Mitsuhiro Adachi, Hankyu Braves (PL)
- Rookie of the Year
  - Shiro Takegami, Sankei Atoms (CL)
  - Yoshimasa Takahashi, Toei Flyers (PL)
- Eiji Sawamura Award
  - Kentaro Ogawa, Chunichi Dragons (CL)

Central League Best Nine Award winners
Position	Player	Team
Pitcher	Kentaro Ogawa	Chunichi
Catcher	Masahiko Mori	Yomiuri
First baseman	Sadaharu Oh	Yomiuri
Second baseman	Morimichi Takagi	Chunichi
Third baseman	Shigeo Nagashima	Yomiuri
Shortstop	Taira Fujita	Hanshin
Outfielder	Kazuhiko Kondo	Taiyo
Outfielder	Isao Shibata	Yomiuri
Outfielder	Toshio Naka	Chunichi

Pacific League Best Nine Award winners
Position	Player	Team
Pitcher	Mitsuhiro Adachi	Hankyu
Catcher	Katsuya Nomura	Nankai
First baseman	Katsuo Osugi	Toei
Second baseman	Don Blasingame	Nankai
Third baseman	Kiyoshi Morimoto	Hankyu
Shortstop	Tsuyoshi Oshita	Nankai
Outfielder	Isao Harimoto	Toei
Outfielder	Tokuji Nagaike	Hankyu
Outfielder	Masahiro Doi	Kintetsu

== See also ==
- 1967 Major League Baseball season
