= 1965 Nippon Professional Baseball season =

1965 NPB season
- League: Nippon Professional Baseball
- Sport: Baseball

Central League pennant
- League champions: Yomiuri Giants
- Runners-up: Chunichi Dragons
- Season MVP: Sadaharu Oh (YOM)

Pacific League pennant
- League champions: Nankai Hawks
- Runners-up: Toei Flyers
- Season MVP: Katsuya Nomura (NAN)

Japan Series
- Champions: Yomiuri Giants
- Runners-up: Nankai Hawks
- Finals MVP: Shigeo Nagashima (YOM)

NPB seasons
- ← 1964 1966 →

The 1965 Nippon Professional Baseball season was the 16th season of operation of Nippon Professional Baseball (NPB).

== Regular season ==
=== Standings ===
Central League regular season standings
Team	G	W	L	T	Pct.	GB
Yomiuri Giants	140	91	47	2	.659	—
Chunichi Dragons	140	77	59	4	.566	13.0
Hanshin Tigers	140	71	66	3	.518	19.5
Taiyo Whales	140	68	70	2	.493	23.0
Hiroshima Carp	140	59	77	4	.434	31.0
Sankei Swallows	140	44	91	5	.326	45.5

Pacific League regular season standings
Team	G	W	L	T	Pct.	GB
Nankai Hawks	140	88	49	3	.642	—
Toei Flyers	140	76	61	3	.555	12.0
Nishitetsu Lions	140	72	64	4	.529	15.5
Hankyu Braves	140	67	71	2	.486	21.5
Tokyo Orions	140	62	74	4	.456	25.5
Kintetsu Buffaloes	140	46	92	2	.333	42.5

== League leaders ==
=== Central League ===
Batting leaders
Stat	Player	Team	Total
Batting average	Shinichi Eto	Chunichi Dragons	.336
Home runs	Sadaharu Oh	Yomiuri Giants	42
Runs batted in	Sadaharu Oh	Yomiuri Giants	104
Runs	Sadaharu Oh	Yomiuri Giants	104
Hits	Kazuhiko Kondo	Taiyo Whales	152
Stolen bases	Morimichi Takagi	Chunichi Dragons	44

Pitching leaders
Stat	Player	Team	Total
Wins	Minoru Murayama	Hanshin Tigers	25
Losses	Seiji Shibutani	Sankei Swallows	22
Earned run average	Masaichi Kaneda	Yomiuri Giants	1.84
Strikeouts	Minoru Murayama	Hanshin Tigers	205
Innings pitched	Minoru Murayama	Hanshin Tigers	307 2/3

=== Pacific League ===
Batting leaders
Stat	Player	Team	Total
Batting average	Katsuya Nomura	Nankai Hawks	.320
Home runs	Katsuya Nomura	Nankai Hawks	42
Runs batted in	Katsuya Nomura	Nankai Hawks	110
Runs	Katsuya Nomura	Nankai Hawks	92
Hits	Katsuya Nomura	Nankai Hawks	156
Stolen bases	Yoshinori Hirose	Nankai Hawks	39

Pitching leaders
Stat	Player	Team	Total
Wins	Yukio Ozaki	Toei Flyers	27
Losses	Kasaaki Koyama; Koichiro Sasaki	Tokyo Orions; Kintetsu Buffaloes	20
Earned run average	Kiyohiro Miura	Nankai Hawks	1.57
Strikeouts	Yukio Ozaki	Toei Flyers	259
Innings pitched	Yukio Ozaki	Toei Flyers	378

== Awards ==
- Most Valuable Player
  - Sadaharu Oh, Yomiuri Giants (CL)
  - Katsuya Nomura, Nankai Hawks (PL)
- Rookie of the Year
  - No CL recipient
  - Masaaki Ikenaga, Nishitetsu Lions (PL)
- Eiji Sawamura Award
  - Minoru Murayama, Hanshin Tigers (CL)

Central League Best Nine Award winners
Position	Player	Team
Pitcher	Minoru Murayama	Hanshin Tigers
Catcher	Masahiko Mori	Yomiuri Giants
First baseman	Sadaharu Oh	Yomiuri Giants
Second baseman	Morimichi Takagi	Chunichi Dragons
Third baseman	Shigeo Nagashima	Yomiuri Giants
Shortstop	Yoshio Yoshida	Hanshin Tigers
Outfielder	Shinichi Eto	Chunichi Dragons
Outfielder	Kazuhiko Kondo	Taiyo Whales
Outfielder	Toshio Naka	Chunichi Dragons

Pacific League Best Nine Award winners
Position	Player	Team
Pitcher	Yukio Ozaki	Toei Flyers
Catcher	Katsuya Nomura	Nankai Hawks
First baseman	Takashi Takagi	Kintetsu Buffaloes
Second baseman	Daryl Spencer	Hankyu Braves
Third baseman	Akitoshi Kodama	Kintetsu Buffaloes
Shortstop	Kenji Koike	Nankai Hawks
Outfielder	Isao Harimoto	Toei Flyers
Outfielder	Yoshinori Hirose	Nankai Hawks
Outfielder	Motoaki Horigome	Nankai Hawks

== See also ==
- 1965 Major League Baseball season
