= List of Nippon Professional Baseball perfect games =

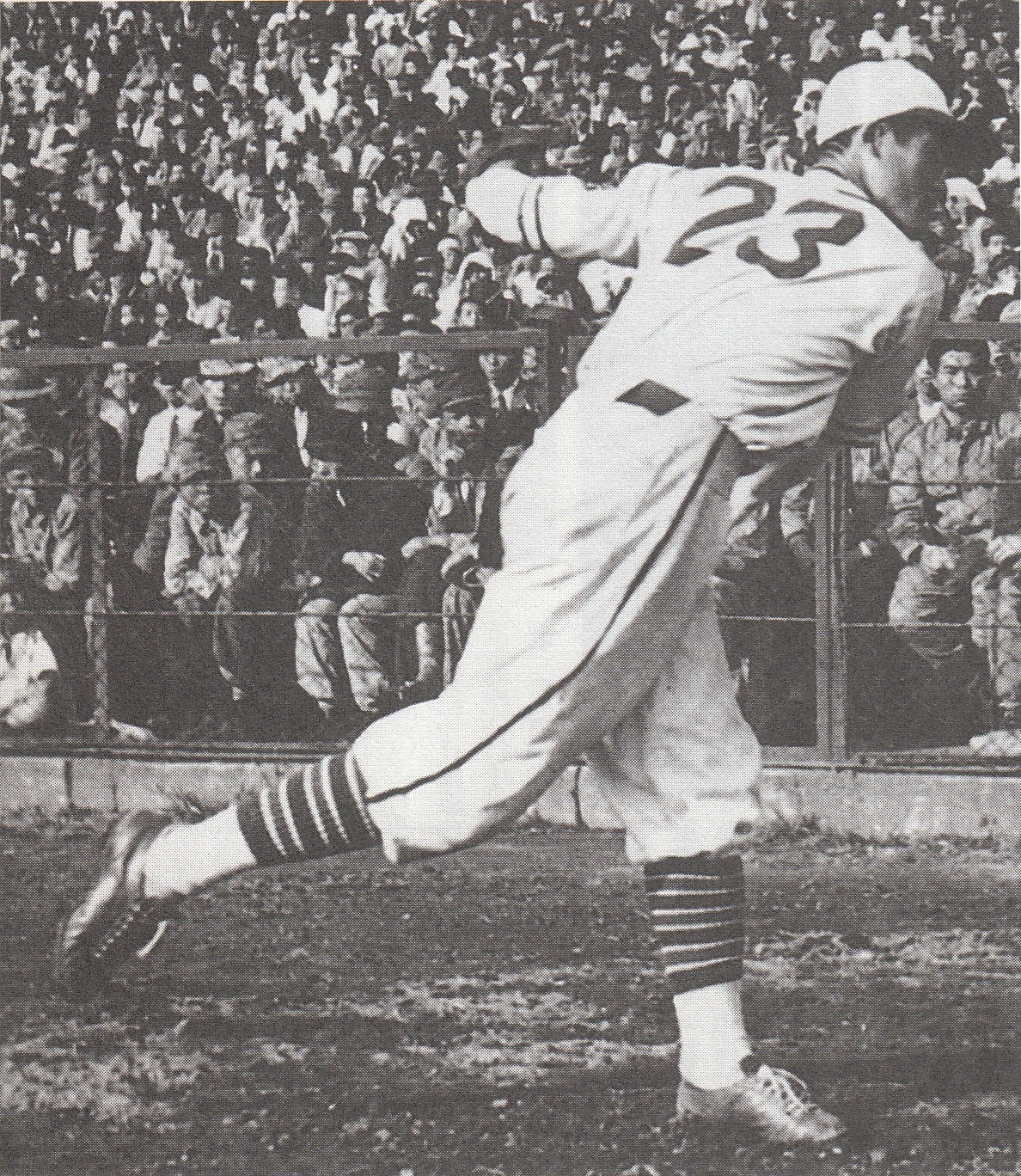
Hideo Fujimoto threw the first perfect game in Nippon Professional Baseball history, on June 28, 1950.

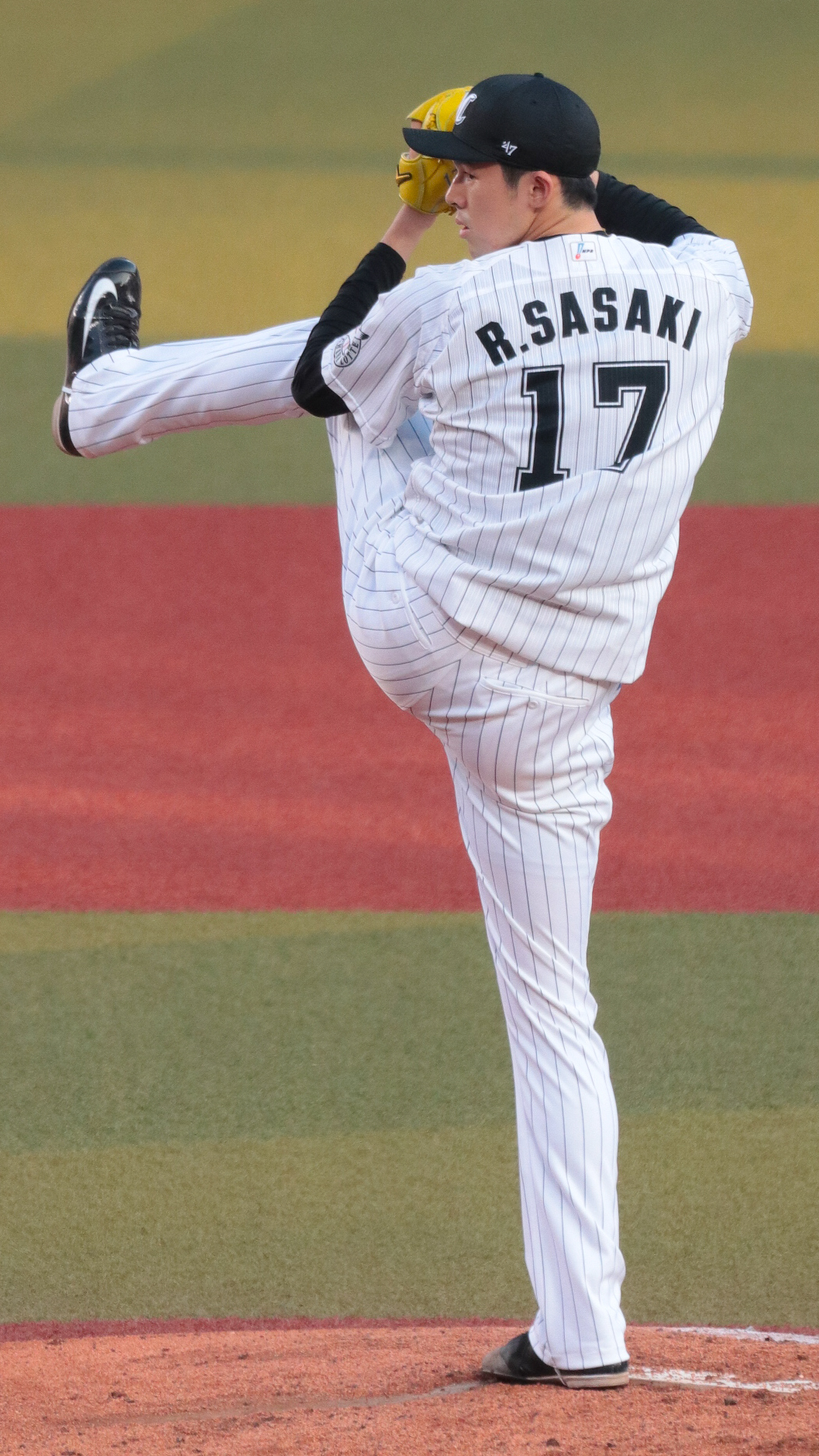
Rōki Sasaki threw the most recent NPB perfect game, on April 10, 2022.

In baseball, throwing a perfect game is a pitching accomplishment in which one or more pitchers does not allow a baserunner on base over the course of one game. In Nippon Professional Baseball, a perfect game is an extremely rare occurrence, only occurring 16 times.

Unlike in Major League Baseball (MLB), combined perfect games are not considered as official perfect games by Nippon Professional Baseball.

== Perfect games ==
Key to symbols in player table
†	Inducted into the Japanese Baseball Hall of Fame and Museum

Pitcher	Date	Club	Score	Opponent	Ballpark	Ref
Hideo Fujimoto†	June 28, 1950	Yomiuri Giants	4–0	Nishi-Nippon Pirates	Aomori Stadium	
Fumio Takechi	June 19, 1955	Kintetsu Pearls	1–0	Daiei Stars	Ōsaka Stadium	
Yoshitomo Miyaji	September 19, 1956	Kokutetsu Swallows	6–0	Hiroshima Carp	Kanazawa Stadium	
Masaichi Kaneda†	August 21, 1957	Kokutetsu Swallows	1–0	Chunichi Dragons	Chunichi Stadium	
Sadao Nishimura	July 19, 1958	Nishitetsu Lions	1–0	Toei Flyers	Komazawa Stadium	
Gentaro Shimada	August 11, 1960	Taiyō Whales	1–0	Ōsaka Tigers	Kawasaki Stadium	
Yoshimi Moritaki	June 20, 1961	Kokutetsu Swallows	1–0	Chunichi Dragons	Korakuen Stadium	
Yoshiro Sasaki	May 1, 1966	Taiyō Whales	1–0	Hiroshima Carp	Hiroshima Municipal Stadium	
Tsutomu Tanaka	May 12, 1966	Nishitetsu Lions	2–0	Nankai Hawks	Heiwadai Stadium	
Yoshiro Sotokoba	September 14, 1968	Hiroshima Toyo Carp	2–0	Taiyō Whales	Hiroshima Municipal Stadium	
Koichiro Sasaki	October 6, 1970	Kintetsu Buffaloes	3–0	Nankai Hawks	Ōsaka Stadium	
Yoshimasa Takahashi	August 21, 1971	Toei Flyers	4–0	Nishitetsu Lions	Korakuen Stadium	
Soroku Yagisawa	October 10, 1973	Lotte Orions	1–0	Taiheiyo Club Lions	Miyagi Stadium	
Yutaro Imai	August 31, 1978	Hankyu Braves	5–0	Lotte Orions	Miyagi Stadium	
Hiromi Makihara	May 18, 1994	Yomiuri Giants	6–0	Hiroshima Toyo Carp	Fukuoka Dome	
Rōki Sasaki	April 10, 2022	Chiba Lotte Marines	6–0	Orix Buffaloes	Zozo Marine Stadium	

== Combined perfect games ==
In Game 5 of the 2007 Japan Series, a rare combined perfect game occurred. However, it is not recognized as such since no-hitters or perfect games achieved by multiple pitchers in one game are considered unofficial by NPB. However, it is recognized by the World Baseball Softball Confederation (WBSC), the international governing body of baseball, as a perfect game.

Date	Pitcher	Club	Score	Opponent	Ballpark	Ref
November 1, 2007	Daisuke Yamai (8 IP) Hitoki Iwase (1 IP)	Chunichi Dragons	1–0	Hokkaido Nippon-Ham Fighters	Nagoya Dome	

== See also ==
- List of Major League Baseball perfect games
