= 1964 Nippon Professional Baseball season =

1964 NPB season
- League: Nippon Professional Baseball
- Sport: Baseball

Central League pennant
- League champions: Hanshin Tigers
- Runners-up: Taiyo Whales
- Season MVP: Sadaharu Oh (YOM)

Pacific League pennant
- League champions: Nankai Hawks
- Runners-up: Hankyu Braves
- Season MVP: Joe Stanka (NAN)

Japan Series
- Champions: Nankai Hawks
- Runners-up: Hanshin Tigers
- Finals MVP: Joe Stanka (NAN)

NPB seasons
- ← 1963 1965 →

The 1964 Nippon Professional Baseball season was the 15th season of operation of Nippon Professional Baseball (NPB).

== Regular season ==
=== Standings ===
Central League regular season standings
Team	G	W	L	T	Pct.	GB
Hanshin Tigers	140	80	56	4	.588	—
Taiyo Whales	140	80	58	2	.580	1.0
Yomiuri Giants	140	71	69	0	.507	11.0
Hiroshima Carp	140	64	73	3	.467	16.5
Kokutetsu Swallows	140	61	74	5	.452	18.5
Chunichi Dragons	140	57	83	0	.407	25.0

Pacific League regular season standings
Team	G	W	L	T	Pct.	GB
Nankai Hawks	150	84	63	3	.571	—
Hankyu Braves	150	79	65	6	.549	3.5
Toei Flyers	150	78	68	4	.534	5.5
Tokyo Orions	150	77	68	5	.531	6.0
Nishitetsu Lions	150	63	81	6	.438	19.5
Kintetsu Buffaloes	150	55	91	4	.377	28.5

== Postseason ==
=== Japan Series ===
PL Nankai Hawks (4) vs. CL Hanshin Tigers (3)

Game	Date	Score	Location	Time	Attendance
1	October 1	Nankai Hawks – 2, Hanshin Tigers – 0	Koshien Stadium	2:14	19,904
2	October 2	Nankai Hawks – 2, Hanshin Tigers – 5	Koshien Stadium	2:15	19,190
3	October 4	Hanshin Tigers – 5, Nankai Hawks – 4	Osaka Stadium	2:47	29,932
4	October 5	Hanshin Tigers – 3, Nankai Hawks – 4	Osaka Stadium	2:16	30,107
5	October 6	Hanshin Tigers – 6, Nankai Hawks – 3	Osaka Stadium	2:28	26,962
6	October 9	Nankai Hawks – 4, Hanshin Tigers – 0	Koshien Stadium	1:46	25,471
7	October 10	Nankai Hawks – 3, Hanshin Tigers – 0	Koshien Stadium	2:07	15,172

== League leaders ==
=== Central League ===
Batting leaders
Stat	Player	Team	Total
Batting average	Shinichi Eto	Chunichi Dragons	.323
Home runs	Sadaharu Oh	Yomiuri Giants	55
Runs batted in	Sadaharu Oh	Yomiuri Giants	119
Runs	Sadaharu Oh	Yomiuri Giants	110
Hits	Takeshi Kuwata	Taiyo Whales	161
Stolen bases	Takeshi Koba	Hiroshima Carp	57

Pitching leaders
Stat	Player	Team	Total
Wins	Gene Bacque	Hanshin Tigers	29
Losses	Minoru Kakimoto	Chunichi Dragons	19
Earned run average	Gene Bacque	Hanshin Tigers	1.89
Strikeouts	Masaichi Kaneda	Kokutetsu Swallows	231
Innings pitched	Gene Bacque	Hanshin Tigers	353 1/3

=== Pacific League ===
Batting leaders
Stat	Player	Team	Total
Batting average	Yoshinori Hirose	Nankai Hawks	.366
Home runs	Katsuya Nomura	Nankai Hawks	41
Runs batted in	Katsuya Nomura	Nankai Hawks	115
Runs	Yoshinori Hirose	Nankai Hawks	110
Hits	Masahiro Doi	Kintetsu Buffaloes	168
Stolen bases	Yoshinori Hirose	Nankai Hawks	72

Pitching leaders
Stat	Player	Team	Total
Wins	Masaaki Koyama	Tokyo Orions	30
Losses	Toshiaki Tokuhisa	Kintetsu Buffaloes	23
Earned run average	Yoshiro Tsumashima	Tokyo Orions	2.15
Strikeouts	Yukio Ozaki	Toei Flyers	197
Innings pitched	Masaaki Koyama	Tokyo Orions	361 1/3

== Awards ==
- Most Valuable Player
  - Sadaharu Oh, Yomiuri Giants (CL)
  - Joe Stanka, Nankai Hawks (PL)
- Rookie of the Year
  - Shigeyuki Takahashi, Taiyo Whales (CL)
  - No PL recipient
- Eiji Sawamura Award
  - Gene Bacque, Hanshin Tigers (CL)

Central League Best Nine Award winners
Position	Player	Team
Pitcher	Gene Bacque	Hanshin Tigers
Catcher	Masahiko Mori	Yomiuri Giants
First baseman	Sadaharu Oh	Yomiuri Giants
Second baseman	Morimichi Takagi	Chunichi Dragons
Third baseman	Shigeo Nagashima	Yomiuri Giants
Shortstop	Yoshio Yoshida	Hanshin Tigers
Outfielder	Kazuhiko Kondo	Taiyo Whales
Outfielder	Shinichi Eto	Chunichi Dragons
Outfielder	Shozo Shigematsu	Taiyo Whales

Pacific League Best Nine Award winners
Position	Player	Team
Pitcher	Joe Stanka	Nankai Hawks
Catcher	Katsuya Nomura	Nankai Hawks
First baseman	Kihachi Enomoto	Tokyo Orions
Second baseman	Daryl Spencer	Hankyu Braves
Third baseman	Akitoshi Kodama	Kintetsu Buffaloes
Shortstop	Kenji Koike	Nankai Hawks
Outfielder	Isao Harimoto	Toei Flyers
Outfielder	Teruyuki Takakura	Nishitetsu Lions
Outfielder	Yoshinori Hirose	Nankai Hawks

== See also ==
- 1964 Major League Baseball season
