= 1966 Nippon Professional Baseball season =

1966 NPB season
- League: Nippon Professional Baseball
- Sport: Baseball

Central League pennant
- League champions: Yomiuri Giants
- Runners-up: Chunichi Dragons
- Season MVP: Shigeo Nagashima (YOM)

Pacific League pennant
- League champions: Nankai Hawks
- Runners-up: Nishitetsu Lions
- Season MVP: Katsuya Nomura (NAN)

Japan Series
- Champions: Yomiuri Giants
- Runners-up: Nankai Hawks
- Finals MVP: Isao Shibata (YOM)

NPB seasons
- ← 1965 1967 →

The 1966 Nippon Professional Baseball season was the 17th season of operation of Nippon Professional Baseball (NPB).

== Regular season ==
=== Standings ===
Central League regular season standings
Team	G	W	L	T	Pct.	GB
Yomiuri Giants	134	89	41	4	.685	—
Chunichi Dragons	132	76	54	2	.585	13.0
Hanshin Tigers	135	64	66	5	.492	25.0
Hiroshima Carp	136	57	73	6	.438	32.0
Taiyo Whales	130	52	78	0	.400	37.0
Sankei Atoms	135	52	78	5	.400	37.0

Pacific League regular season standings
Team	G	W	L	T	Pct.	GB
Nankai Hawks	133	79	51	3	.608	—
Nishitetsu Lions	138	75	55	8	.577	4.0
Toei Flyers	136	70	60	6	.538	9.0
Tokyo Orions	134	61	69	4	.469	18.0
Hankyu Braves	134	57	73	4	.438	22.0
Kintetsu Buffaloes	133	48	62	3	.369	31.0

== League leaders ==
=== Central League ===
Batting leaders
Stat	Player	Team	Total
Batting average	Shigeo Nagashima	Yomiuri	.344
Home runs	Sadaharu Oh	Yomiuri	48
Runs batted in	Sadaharu Oh	Yomiuri	116
Runs	Sadaharu Oh	Yomiuri	111
Hits	Shigeo Nagashima	Yomiuri	163
Stolen bases	Isao Shibata	Yomiuri	46

Pitching leaders
Stat	Player	Team	Total
Wins	Minoru Murayama	Hanshin	24
Losses	Susumu Oba; Susumu Sato	Hiroshima; Sankei	18
Earned run average	Tsuneo Horiuchi	Yomiuri	1.39
Strikeouts	Minoru Murayama	Hanshin	207
Innings pitched	Minoru Murayama	Hanshin	290 1/3

=== Pacific League ===
Batting leaders
Stat	Player	Team	Total
Batting average	Kihachi Enomoto	Tokyo	.351
Home runs	Katsuya Nomura	Nankai	34
Runs batted in	Katsuya Nomura	Nankai	97
Runs	Katsuya Nomura	Nankai	82
Hits	Kihachi Enomoto	Tokyo	167
Stolen bases	Koji Yamamoto	Hankyu	32

Pitching leaders
Stat	Player	Team	Total
Wins	Tetsuya Yoneda	Hankyu	25
Losses	Shigemasa Yamamoto	Kintetsu	19
Earned run average	Kazuhisa Inao	Nishitetsu	1.79
Strikeouts	Tsutomu Tanaka	Nishitetsu	217
Innings pitched	Tetsuya Yoneda	Hankyu	310

== Awards ==
- Most Valuable Player
  - Shigeo Nagashima, Yomiuri Giants (CL)
  - Katsuya Nomura, Nankai Hawks (PL)
- Rookie of the Year
  - Tsuneo Horiuchi, Yomiuri Giants (CL)
  - No PL recipient
- Eiji Sawamura Award
  - Minoru Murayama, Hanshin Tigers (CL) and Tsuneo Horiuchi, Yomiuri Giants (CL)

Central League Best Nine Award winners
Position	Player	Team
Pitcher	Minoru Murayama	Hanshin
Catcher	Masahiko Mori	Yomiuri
First baseman	Sadaharu Oh	Yomiuri
Second baseman	Morimichi Takagi	Chunichi
Third baseman	Shigeo Nagashima	Yomiuri
Shortstop	Shuhei Ichieda	Chunichi
Outfielder	Shinichi Eto	Chunichi
Outfielder	Koji Yamamoto	Hankyu
Outfielder	Toshio Naka	Chunichi

Pacific League Best Nine Award winners
Position	Player	Team
Pitcher	Tsutomu Tanaka	Nishitetsu
Catcher	Katsuya Nomura	Nankai
First baseman	Kihachi Enomoto	Tokyo
Second baseman	Yasunori Kunisada	Nankai
Third baseman	Tony Roig	Nishitetsu
Shortstop	Kenji Koike	Nankai
Outfielder	Isao Harimoto	Toei
Outfielder	Shoichi Busujima	Toei
Outfielder	Teruyuki Takakura	Nishitetsu

== See also ==
- 1966 Major League Baseball season
