= Carl Boles =

American baseball player (1934–2022)

- Left fielder
- Born: October 31, 1934; Center Point, Arkansas, U.S.
- Died: April 8, 2022 (aged 87); Tampa, Florida, U.S.
- Batted: Right Threw: Right

Professional debut
- MLB: August 2, 1962, for the San Francisco Giants
- NPB: April 10, 1966, for the Kintetsu Buffaloes

Last appearance
- MLB: October 2, 1962, for the San Francisco Giants
- NPB: June 3, 1971, for the Nishitetsu Lions

MLB statistics
- Batting average: .375
- Home runs: 0
- Runs batted in: 1

NPB statistics
- Batting average: .265
- Home runs: 117
- Runs batted in: 294
- Stats at Baseball Reference

Teams
- San Francisco Giants (1962); Kintetsu Buffaloes (1966–1968); Nishitetsu Lions (1969–1971)

Carl Theodore Boles (October 31, 1934 – April 8, 2022) was an American professional baseball player whose career included seven years in minor league baseball, six in Japan, and a 19-game trial in the Major Leagues for the 1962 San Francisco Giants. He threw and batted right-handed, stood 5 feet 11 inches (1.80 m) tall and weighed 185 pounds (84 kg). He attended the University of Arkansas at Pine Bluff (then known as Arkansas AM&N).

Boles was 27 years old and hitting .337 with 18 home runs in the Double-A Texas League when the Giants recalled him in August 1962. His 19 games with the Giants included four starts as the club's left fielder, 12 pinch hitting assignments and three games as a pinch runner. In the 1962 National League tie-breaker series against the Los Angeles Dodgers, Boles pinch-ran for Ed Bailey in the eighth inning of the second playoff game and scored the Giants' seventh and tying run in a game they eventually lost, 8–7. San Francisco, however, won the National League championship the next day. In his two months with the Giants, Boles collected nine hits, all singles, and batted .375. He did not appear in the 1962 World Series, in which the Giants were defeated by the New York Yankees, four games to three.

During Boles' six years in Japanese baseball, he showcased his power hitting, with seasons of 26, 28 and 31 home runs. He was an influential figure in uncovering the Black Mist Scandal matching-fixing scheme in professional baseball and in flat track motorcycle racing, which is a pair-mutuel betting sport in Japan. He retired in 1971.
