= Roki Sasaki =

Japanese baseball player (born 2001)

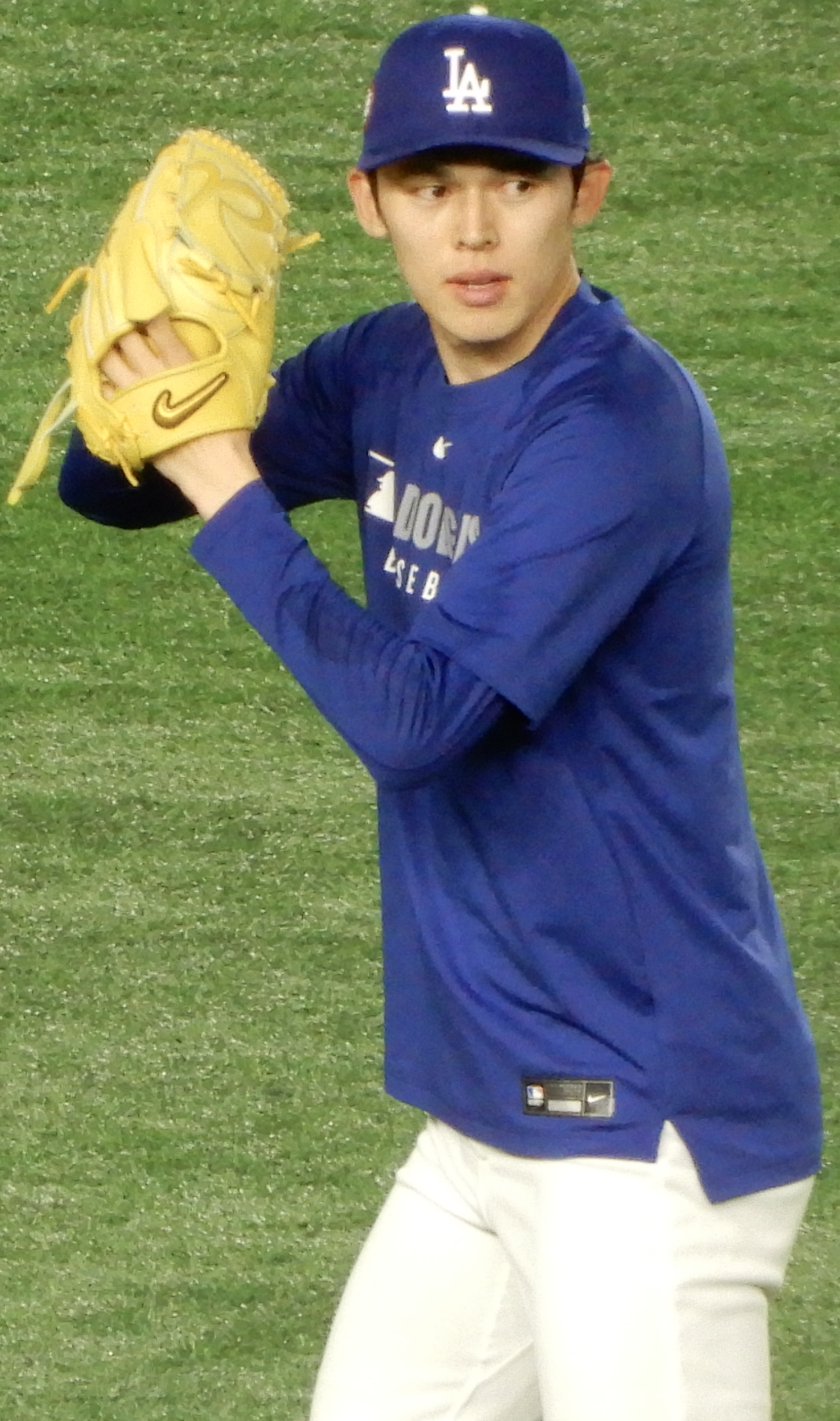
- Sasaki with the Los Angeles Dodgers in March 2025

Los Angeles Dodgers – No. 11
- Pitcher
- Born: November 3, 2001 (age 25); Rikuzentakata, Iwate, Japan
- Bats: Right Throws: Right

Professional debut
- NPB: May 16, 2021, for the Chiba Lotte Marines
- MLB: March 19, 2025, for the Los Angeles Dodgers

NPB statistics (through 2024 season)
- Win–loss record: 29–15
- Earned run average: 2.10
- Strikeouts: 505

MLB statistics (through 2026 season)
- Win–loss record: 6–6
- Earned run average: 4.48
- Strikeouts: 151
- Stats at Baseball Reference

Teams
- Chiba Lotte Marines (2021–2024); Los Angeles Dodgers (2025–present)

Career highlights and awards
- NPB: Pitched a perfect game on April 10, 2022; 2× NPB All-Star (2022, 2023); Chiba City Special Award "New Era Hometown Impressive Award" (2022); NPB/World records: 19 Strikeouts in a single game (NPB record); 13 Consecutive Strikeouts in a single game (World record); MLB: World Series champion (2025)
Medals
Men's baseball
Representing Japan
World Baseball Classic
Gold medal – first place	2023 Miami	Team

Roki Sasaki (Japanese: 佐々木 朗希, Hepburn: Sasaki Rōki; born November 3, 2001) is a Japanese professional baseball pitcher for the Los Angeles Dodgers of Major League Baseball (MLB). Nicknamed "The Monster of the Reiwa Era" (令和の怪物, Reiwa no Kaibutsu), he had previously played in Nippon Professional Baseball (NPB) for the Chiba Lotte Marines. He made his NPB debut in 2021 for the Marines.

Sasaki set a new Japanese high school baseball record with a fastball recorded at 101 miles per hour (163 km/h). The Marines chose Sasaki with the first overall pick of the 2019 NPB draft, although he would not make his NPB debut until 2021. He threw a perfect game on April 10, 2022, in which he tied the NPB record for strikeouts in one game and set a new record for consecutive strikeouts.

Following the end of the 2024 Nippon Professional Baseball season, Sasaki was posted by the Marines and was signed by the Dodgers, making his MLB debut during the 2025 season. He won his first World Series title the same year, as the Dodgers defeated the Toronto Blue Jays in seven games.

== Early life ==
Sasaki was born on November 3, 2001, in Rikuzentakata, Iwate Prefecture. He was named after the villain Rouki from the Super Sentai show Hyakujuu Sentai Gaoranger, which was airing at the time. He was in the third grade when the province was hit by the 2011 Tōhoku earthquake. The resulting tsunami swept away his house. His father and grandparents died, while Sasaki, his mother, and his two brothers had to live in a nursing home during the recovery. The family moved to Ōfunato the next year and Sasaki began to play baseball at his new school. He graduated from Ōfunato High School in March 2020.

== Amateur career ==
Though other high schools recruited Sasaki, he chose to attend Ofunato High School to remain with his teammates. He was nicknamed "the Monster of the Reiwa Era" (Reiwa no Kaibutsu 令和の怪物) because of his 101 mph (163 km/h) fastball in high school. His fastball velocity broke the Japanese high school record set by Shohei Ohtani, and Sasaki began to earn comparisons to Ohtani. His nickname is a reference to Daisuke Matsuzaka, who was known as "the Monster of the Heisei Era".

Major League Baseball (MLB) teams hoped that Sasaki would pursue an MLB career, but he opted to remain with his high school team during the Japanese High School Baseball Championship. Sasaki's manager rested him in the qualifying game where Ofunato was eliminated, drawing criticism. Sasaki announced that he would pitch in Nippon Professional Baseball (NPB), declaring for the NPB draft.

== Professional career ==
=== Chiba Lotte Marines ===
==== 2019–2021 ====
After four teams attempted to select Sasaki in the 2019 NPB draft, the Chiba Lotte Marines of NPB's Pacific League won the lottery for the rights to the first overall selection, and selected Sasaki. He received a signing bonus of ¥100 million (US$631,648.1). To protect his arm, the Marines did not allow Sasaki to appear in a game during the 2020 season. He made his NPB debut on May 16, 2021. For the 2021 season, Sasaki had a 3–2 win–loss record, a 2.27 earned run average (ERA), and 68 strikeouts in 63 1/3 innings pitched across 11 appearances. Sasaki made his postseason debut for the Marines in the 2021 Pacific League Climax Series, striking out 10 batters while allowing one run in six innings, as Lotte defeated the Tohoku Rakuten Golden Eagles.

==== 2022 season ====
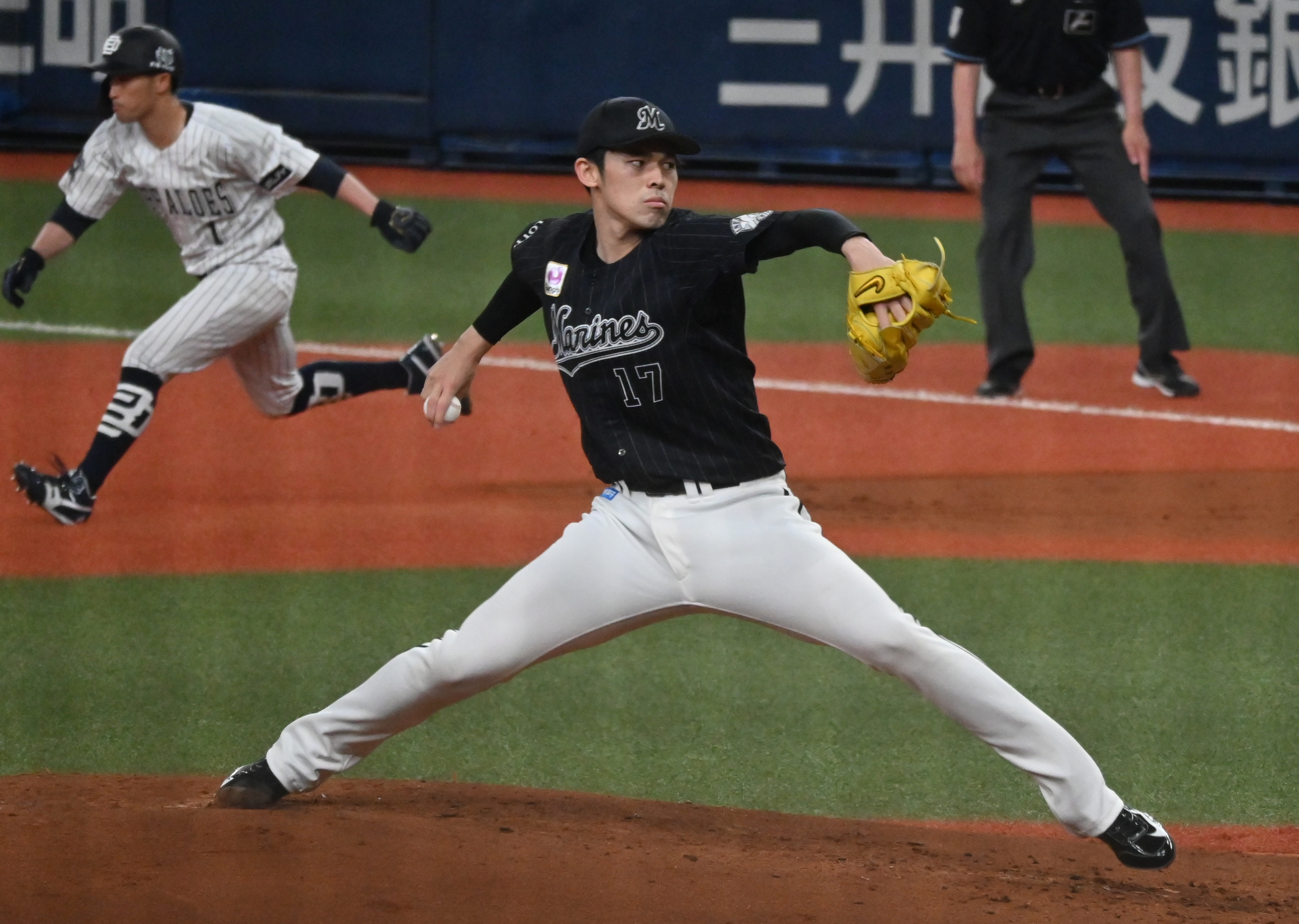
Sasaki pitching in 2022

On April 10, 2022, Sasaki pitched a perfect game against the Orix Buffaloes. It was the 16th perfect game in NPB history, the first since Hiromi Makihara's perfect game in 1994, and the 94th no-hitter in NPB history, the first since August 15, 2020. Sasaki tied the NPB record set by Koji Noda for total strikeouts in one game, with 19, and set a new NPB record for consecutive strikeouts, having struck out 13 batters in a row. This also became a new world record, beating out the 10 consecutive strikeouts achieved in MLB by Corbin Burnes, Tom Seaver, and Aaron Nola.

In his next start, on April 17, Sasaki pitched eight perfect innings against the Hokkaido Nippon-Ham Fighters, before getting taken out from the game before the ninth inning by manager Tadahito Iguchi to protect Sasaki's health. He recorded 14 strikeouts on 102 pitches, including striking out the side in the eighth inning with a 101 mph fastball. Sasaki finished the outing having retired 52 consecutive batters, setting an NPB record. The MLB record for retiring consecutive batters is 46 by Yusmeiro Petit. Sasaki allowed a hit on the first pitch that he threw in his next game, on April 24. He finished the season 9–4 with a 2.02 ERA and 173 strikeouts in 129 1/3 innings pitched.

==== 2023–2024 ====
On April 28, 2023, Sasaki threw 4 pitches at a speed of 165 km/h (102.5 mph), which tied the record held by Shohei Ohtani for the fastest pitch by a Japanese player in NPB history. In the 2023 season, he was 7–4 with a 1.78 ERA and 135 strikeouts in 91 innings and he followed that up with a 10–5 record, 2.35 ERA and 129 strikeouts in 111 innings in 2024. On November 8, 2024, the Marines posted Sasaki to allow him to pursue an opportunity with Major League Baseball.

=== Los Angeles Dodgers ===
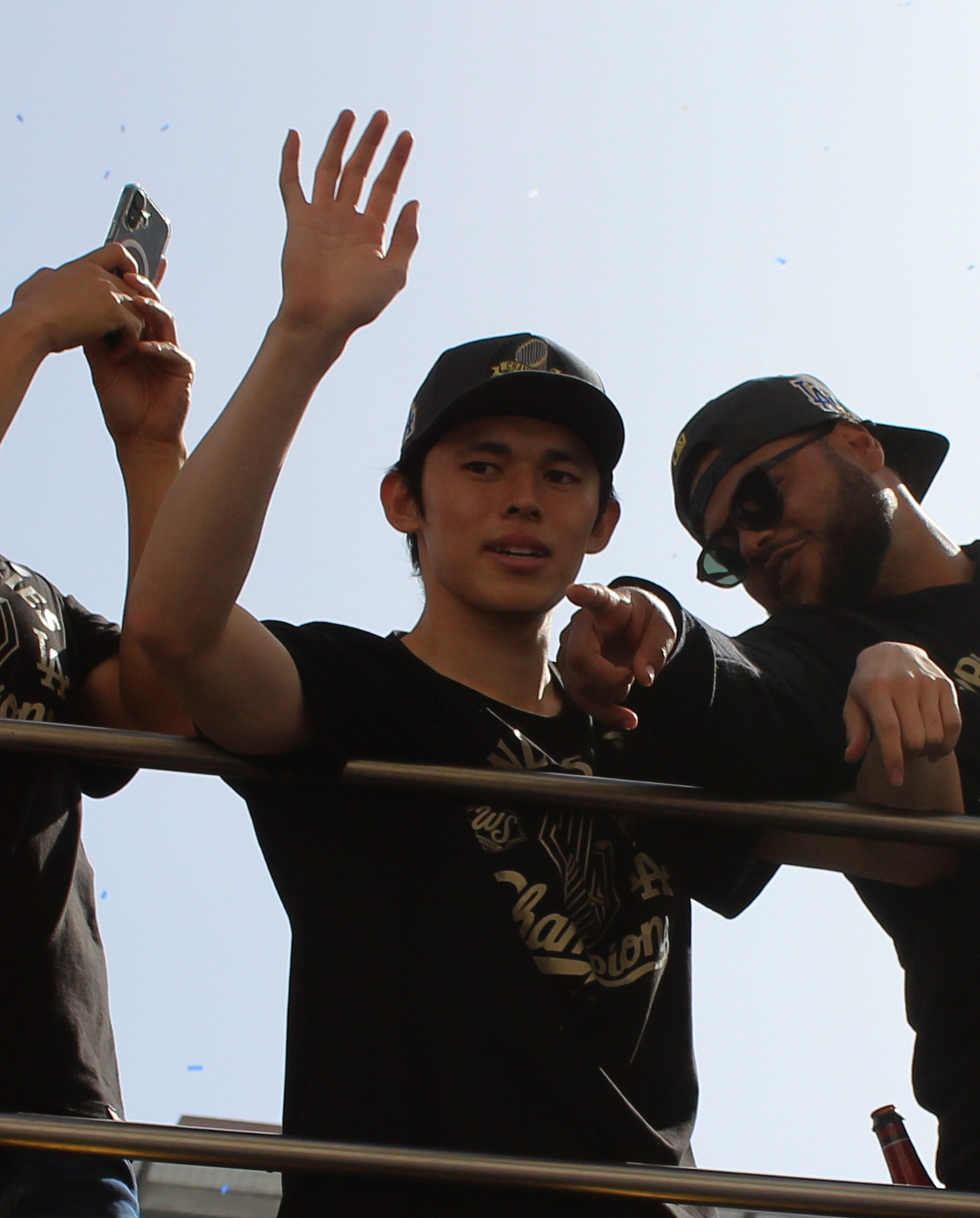
Sasaki at the Dodgers victory parade on November 3, 2025

==== 2025 ====
On January 22, 2025, Sasaki signed a contract with the Los Angeles Dodgers, which featured a $6.5 million signing bonus. Because he was under the age of 25 at the time, regulations required that he had to sign a minor league deal. Shortly after his signing, Baseball America and MLB.com both named him the No. 1 prospect in MLB entering the 2025 season.

Sasaki made the Dodgers' opening day roster and was announced as the starter for the second game of the season in the MLB Tokyo Series 2025 against the Chicago Cubs on March 19, 2025. In his debut, he allowed one run on one hit and five walks while striking out three. His first MLB strikeout was of Seiya Suzuki. Sasaki earned his first major league win on May 3 against the Atlanta Braves. On May 13, Sasaki was placed on the 15-day injured list with a right shoulder impingement; he was transferred to the 60-day injured list on June 20. After a lengthy rehab assignment in the minors, Sasaki was activated from the injured list on September 24 with the intention of working as a relief pitcher for the rest of the season. He made eight starts before his injury and made two relief appearances in September, compiling a 1–1 record, 4.46 ERA, 28 strikeouts, and 22 walks.

Sasaki recorded his first professional save when he closed out the Dodgers victory in the opening game of the 2025 National League Division Series against the Philadelphia Phillies. He pitched in three games in the series, earning saves in the first two games and then working three perfect innings in relief in the decisive fourth game. He pitched 2 2/3 innings over two games in the 2025 World Series, which the Dodgers won in seven games, thus giving him his first-career World Series title.

==== 2026 ====
During his first career start at Yankee Stadium in July, Sasaki threw a franchise record 21 pitches over 100mph. Sasaki made 23 starts for the Dodgers in 2026, remaining a regular fixture in the starting rotation until he was placed on the injured list in late August due to blister concerns. When he rejoined the team in late September, he was moved to the bullpen to prepare him for his postseason role. In 26 appearances (23 starts) he finished the season 5–5 with a 4.49 ERA and 123 strikeouts.

== International career ==
Sasaki pitched for the Japanese national baseball team in the 2023 World Baseball Classic (WBC). He made his first start of the competition on March 11 against the Czech Republic, pitching 3 2/3 innings while giving up two hits, an unearned run, two walks, and recording eight strikeouts. On March 20, he started in Japan's WBC semifinal game against Mexico, pitching for four innings while giving up five hits, three runs, and recording three strikeouts. He finished the tournament at 1–0 with a 3.52 ERA and 11 strikeouts across 7 2/3 innings, receiving a gold medal in Japan's championship victory over the United States.

Sasaki's performance in the 2023 WBC received international media attention. In his start against Mexico, his average four-seam fastball velocity was 100.5 mph (161.7 km/h) and topped out at 101.9 mph (164.0 km/h). His split-finger fastball averaged 91.2 mph (146.8 km/h) and generated 31.4 inches (800 mm) of vertical break. Three Major League Baseball executives compared Sasaki's abilities at age 21 to those of Stephen Strasburg, who was selected first overall in the 2009 Major League Baseball draft and was considered one of the most anticipated prospects in the league's history.

== Personal life ==
On February 21, 2025, Sasaki announced on Instagram that he is married, explaining that he "entered into the family of a common woman."

== Pitching style ==
Sasaki is listed as 6 feet 2 inches (1.88 m) and 187 pounds (85 kg). A right-handed pitcher with a three-quarters delivery, he throws a four-seam fastball that throughout his career, has averaged between 95-100 mph, topping out at 102.5 mph (165 km/h). His signature offering in the NPB was an 87-92 mph power split-finger fastball that was known for its higher than average drop. However by the time he made his MLB debut, Sasaki had modified his split-finger with a forkball-like grip that ranged in the mid to high 80s, and was often compared to a knuckleball due to its lower than average spin rate and extremely high vertical drop. During the 2026 season however, he began to utilize a 88-93 mph split-finger that includes arm-side run, which his previous iterations don't do. He has since thrown this splitter alongside his forkball. Additionally, Sasaki has experimented with a variety of different breaking balls. He originally threw a sweeper during his time in the NPB and in 2025, however this was abandoned in favor of a gyro slider. He also used to utilize a rarely thrown curveball during his time in the NPB.

== See also ==
- List of Major League Baseball players from Japan
- List of Nippon Professional Baseball no-hitters
- List of Nippon Professional Baseball perfect games
