= 1968 Nippon Professional Baseball season =

1968 NPB season
- League: Nippon Professional Baseball
- Sport: Baseball

Central League pennant
- League champions: Yomiuri Giants
- Runners-up: Hanshin Tigers
- Season MVP: Shigeo Nagashima (YOM)

Pacific League pennant
- League champions: Hankyu Braves
- Runners-up: Nankai Hawks
- Season MVP: Tetsuya Yoneda (HAN)

Japan Series
- Champions: Yomiuri Giants
- Runners-up: Hankyu Braves
- Finals MVP: Shigeru Takada (YOM)

NPB seasons
- ← 1967 1969 →

The 1968 Nippon Professional Baseball season was the 19th season of operation of Nippon Professional Baseball (NPB).

== Regular season ==
=== Standings ===
Central League regular season standings
| Team | G | W | L | T | Pct. | GB |
|---|---|---|---|---|---|---|
| Yomiuri Giants | 134 | 77 | 53 | 4 | .592 | — |
| Hanshin Tigers | 133 | 72 | 58 | 3 | .554 | 5.0 |
| Hiroshima Toyo Carp | 134 | 68 | 62 | 4 | .523 | 9.0 |
| Sankei Atoms | 134 | 64 | 66 | 4 | .492 | 13.0 |
| Taiyo Whales | 133 | 59 | 71 | 3 | .454 | 18.0 |
| Chunichi Dragons | 134 | 50 | 80 | 4 | .385 | 27.0 |

Pacific League regular season standings
| Team | G | W | L | T | Pct. | GB |
|---|---|---|---|---|---|---|
| Hankyu Braves | 134 | 80 | 50 | 4 | .615 | — |
| Nankai Hawks | 136 | 79 | 51 | 6 | .608 | 1.0 |
| Tokyo Orions | 139 | 67 | 63 | 9 | .515 | 13.0 |
| Kintetsu Buffaloes | 135 | 57 | 73 | 5 | .438 | 23.0 |
| Nishitetsu Lions | 133 | 56 | 74 | 3 | .431 | 24.0 |
| Toei Flyers | 135 | 51 | 79 | 5 | .392 | 29.0 |

== League leaders ==
=== Central League ===
Batting leaders
| Stat | Player | Team | Total |
|---|---|---|---|
| Batting average | Sadaharu Oh | Yomiuri | .326 |
| Home runs | Sadaharu Oh | Yomiuri | 49 |
| Runs batted in | Shigeo Nagashima | Yomiuri | 125 |
| Runs | Sadaharu Oh | Yomiuri | 107 |
| Hits | Shigeo Nagashima | Yomiuri | 157 |
| Stolen bases | Takeshi Koba | Hiroshima | 39 |

Pitching leaders
| Stat | Player | Team | Total |
|---|---|---|---|
| Wins | Yutaka Enatsu | Hanshin | 25 |
| Losses | Kentaro Ogawa | Chunichi | 20 |
| Earned run average | Yoshiro Sotokoba | Hiroshima | 1.94 |
| Strikeouts | Yutaka Enatsu | Hanshin | 401 |
| Innings pitched | Yutaka Enatsu | Hanshin | 329 |

=== Pacific League ===
Batting leaders
| Stat | Player | Team | Total |
|---|---|---|---|
| Batting average | Isao Harimoto | Toei | .336 |
| Home runs | Katsuya Nomura | Nankai | 38 |
| Runs batted in | George Altman | Tokyo | 100 |
| Runs | George Altman | Tokyo | 84 |
| Hits | George Altman | Tokyo | 170 |
| Stolen bases | Toshinori Yasui | Kintetsu | 54 |

Pitching leaders
| Stat | Player | Team | Total |
|---|---|---|---|
| Wins | Mutsuo Minagawa | Nankai | 31 |
| Losses | Toshiaki Moriyasu | Toei | 23 |
| Earned run average | Mutsuo Minagawa | Nankai | 1.61 |
| Strikeouts | Keishi Suzuki | Kintetsu | 305 |
| Innings pitched | Keishi Suzuki | Kintetsu | 359 |

== Awards ==
- Most Valuable Player
  - Shigeo Nagashima, Yomiuri Giants (CL)
  - Tetsuya Yoneda, Hankyu Braves (PL)
- Rookie of the Year
  - Shigeru Takada, Yomiuri Giants (CL)
  - No PL recipient
- Eiji Sawamura Award
  - Yutaka Enatsu, Hanshin Tigers (CL)

Central League Best Nine Award winners
| Position | Player | Team |
|---|---|---|
| Pitcher | Yutaka Enatsu | Hanshin |
| Catcher | Masahiko Mori | Yomiuri |
| First baseman | Sadaharu Oh | Yomiuri |
| Second baseman | Shozo Doi | Yomiuri |
| Third baseman | Shigeo Nagashima | Yomiuri |
| Shortstop | Yukinobu Kuroe | Yomiuri |
| Outfielder | Dave Roberts | Sankei |
| Outfielder | Kazuhiro Yamauchi | Yomiuri |
| Outfielder | Shinichi Eto | Chunichi |

Pacific League Best Nine Award winners
| Position | Player | Team |
|---|---|---|
| Pitcher | Mutsuo Minagawa | Nankai |
| Catcher | Katsuya Nomura | Nankai |
| First baseman | Kihachi Enomoto | Tokyo |
| Second baseman | Don Blasingame | Nankai |
| Third baseman | Yasunori Kunisada | Nankai |
| Shortstop | Toshizo Sakamoto | Hankyu |
| Outfielder | George Altman | Tokyo |
| Outfielder | Masahiro Doi | Kintetsu |
| Outfielder | Isao Harimoto | Toei |

== See also ==
- 1968 Major League Baseball season
