= Joe Stanka =

American baseball player (1931–2018)

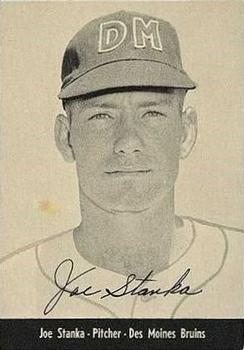
- Pitcher
- Born: July 23, 1931; Hammon, Oklahoma, U.S.
- Died: October 15, 2018 (aged 87); Katy, Texas, U.S.
- Batted: Right Threw: Right

Professional debut
- MLB: September 2, 1959, for the Chicago White Sox
- NPB: April 13, 1960, for the Nankai Hawks

Last appearance
- MLB: September 5, 1959, for the Chicago White Sox
- NPB: October 9, 1966, for the Taiyo Whales

MLB statistics
- Win–loss record: 1–0
- Earned run average: 3.38
- Strikeouts: 3

NPB statistics
- Win–loss record: 100–72
- Earned run average: 3.03
- Strikeouts: 887
- Stats at Baseball Reference

Teams
- Chicago White Sox (1959); Nankai Hawks (1960–1965); Taiyo Whales (1966)

Career highlights and awards
- 2× NPB All-Star (1960, 1964); Japan Series champion (1964); Pacific League MVP (1964); Japan Series MVP (1964); NPB All-Star Game MVP (1964); Best Nine Award (1964); Japan Series Fighting Spirit Award (1961)

Joe Donald Stanka (July 23, 1931 – October 15, 2018) was an American professional baseball player. The right-handed pitcher from Hammon, Oklahoma played for the Chicago White Sox of Major League Baseball in 1959, and the Nankai Hawks and Taiyo Whales in Nippon Professional Baseball from 1960 to 1966. He stood at 6 feet 6 inches (1.98 m) tall and weighed 201 pounds (91 kg).

== Biography ==
After attending Oklahoma State University, Stanka spent most of his career in the minor leagues, making his Major League debut with the White Sox in 1959 at age 28. His big-league career consisted of only two appearances that year. In his first MLB game, on September 2 against the Detroit Tigers, Stanka entered the game in relief of starting pitcher Barry Latman in the fifth inning at Comiskey Park with Chicago trailing 3–0. He retired the Tigers without further damage. Then, in their half of the fifth, the White Sox exploded for 11 runs, with Stanka contributing to the rally with a single in his second big-league at bat. He went on to pitch 31/3 innings of one-hit, one-run relief and was credited with the win in an 11–4 White Sox triumph. Stanka pitched in only one more contest that month, a two-inning relief stint against the Cleveland Indians, on September 5. The White Sox and Indians were then embroiled in a pennant race that ultimately delivered Chicago its first American League pennant since 1919. Stanka did not appear in the 1959 World Series, as the Los Angeles Dodgers defeated the White Sox in 6 games.

In two games and 51/3 MLB innings pitched, Stanka allowed two hits, two earned runs and four bases on balls; he struck out three. His career 1–0 win–loss record was accompanied by a 3.38 earned run average.

He signed with the Nankai Hawks (now the Fukuoka SoftBank Hawks) during the 1959 off-season. He was one of the first players to be signed from the Triple-A class of the minor leagues, and the team calculated that he should be able to win over 15 games in the Pacific League. White Sox owner Bill Veeck let him leave for Nankai on the condition that the Hawks would loan their ace, Tadashi Sugiura, to the White Sox if the Hawks were either out of or locked up the Pacific League pennant race by September 1960. This never came to fruition, as the Hawks would battle the Daimai Orions to the end of the season, eventually finishing 2nd to the Orions by only four games.

Stanka entered the starting rotation in his first year, and marked a 17–12 record in his first year, leading the league with 103 walks allowed. He played his best season in 1964, winning 26 games, becoming the first player of non-Japanese descent to win Pacific League MVP, and the first to do so in Japan as a whole since Bucky Harris won it with the Korakuen Eagles in the fall of 1937. He then pitched shutouts in Games 1, 6, and 7 of the 1964 Japan Series against the Hanshin Tigers to win the Japan Series MVP award as well.

He continued to pitch for the Hawks in 1965, but left the team after his eldest son died in a tragic accident. He played for the Taiyo Whales in 1966 before retiring. He is tied with Gene Bacque for the most wins among American players in Japan, going 100–72 during his seven-year career in Japan.

Stanka appeared as himself on the January 1, 1962 episode of the game show To Tell The Truth.

Stanka died on October 15, 2018.

== See also ==
- American expatriate baseball players in Japan
