= Black Mist Scandal =

Black Mist Scandal (黒い霧事件, kuroi kiri jiken) may refer to:

- Black Mist Scandal, a political scandal involving Eisaku Satō
- Black Mist Scandal (Japanese baseball), a game-fixing scandal
