= Black Mist Scandal (Japanese baseball) =

Japanese game-fixing scandals, 1969–1971

The Black Mist Scandal (黒い霧事件, kuroi kiri jiken) refers to a series of game fixing scandals in Japan's Nippon Professional Baseball (NPB) league and flat track motorcycle racing between 1969 and 1971. The fallout from these scandals resulted in several star players receiving long suspensions, salary cuts, or being banned from professional play entirely. The scandals led many fans in Japan to abandon the sport, and also to the sale of such illustrious teams as the Nishitetsu Lions and Toei Flyers (now the Seibu Lions and Hokkaidō Nippon Ham Fighters).

The term "black mist" was a reference to a political scandal that had enveloped the administration of Prime Minister Eisaku Satō just a few years earlier; "bribery was said to envelop politics like a black mist."

== History ==
The Black Mist Scandal had multiple components, involving the yakuza and members of both Nippon Professional Baseball (NPB) and professional flat track motorcycle racing (one of the four public sports where parimutuel betting is permitted) teams. Baseball players and executives were implicated in fixing competitions in both sports. The bulk of the revelations around the scandal came out between the fall of 1969 and the spring of 1970. Eventually, more than fifteen NPB players and coaches were implicated in game-fixing and sports betting, while five flat track racers were found to be involved in a race-fixing scheme. Members of nine NPB teams were implicated, with seven players coming from the Nishitetsu Lions alone. Ten NPB current and former players — including star pitchers Masaaki Ikenaga, Kentarō Ogawa, and Tsutomu Tanaka — were banned from the game for life.

=== Game-fixing ===
During the 1969 season, Lions foreign player Carl Boles reported to the Hochi Shimbum players were playing suspiciously, leading to a front office investigation where on October 7, 1969, pitcher Masayuki Nagayasu was found to have taken bribes from a yakuza clan to throw games. The team announced that Nagayasu would be released after the end of the season, and the story was reported in Japanese newspapers the next day. Late in November, the executive committee presiding over the NPB at the time voted to ban Nagayasu from the league for life, the first time any player had been banned from Japanese baseball.

On April 1, 1970, in an exclusive tape-recorded interview with the Shūkan Post newspaper, also broadcast on Fuji Television, Nagayasu revealed that other players on his former team were also involved in game-fixing. The NPB summoned seven players to testify about their involvement: Nagayasu, team ace Masaaki Ikenaga, pitchers Yoshinobu Yoda and Akio Masuda, catcher Kimiyasu Murakami, and infielders Kazuhide Funada and Mitsuo Motoi. Yoda and Masuda admitted their involvement. Ikenaga claimed to be uninvolved, but had not returned the ¥1 million he had received from Chunichi Dragons pitcher and former teammate Tsutomu Tanaka as an invitation to cheat.

One month later, Toei Flyers pitchers Toshiaki Moriyasu and Mitsugu Tanaka were revealed to be under suspicion of throwing baseball games. A subsequent report revealed that Kintetsu Buffaloes front-office official Akira Yano had been coerced into throwing games as a player during the 1967 season.

On May 25, 1970, the executive committee issued the following punishments to the accused Nishitetsu players:

- Masayuki Ikenaga, Yoshinobu Yoda, Akio Masuda: Banned for life
- Kimiyasu Murakami and Kazuhide Funada: Suspended until the end of the 1970 season
- Mitsuo Motoi: Given a "severe warning"

In June the committee banned the Buffaloes' Akira Yano from baseball for life. In July, Buffaloes outfielder Masahiro Doi was prosecuted for illegal gambling. He was later suspended by the NPB for a month.

On July 30, 1970, the committee issued the following punishments for the Toei players:

- Toshiaki Moriyasu: Banned from baseball for life
- Mitsugu Tanaka: Received a warning

On November 30, Hanshin Tigers pitcher Yutaka Enatsu received a stern warning from the Central League president due to "involvement with persons in baseball gambling."

On January 11, 1971, Nankai Hawks pitcher Kiyohiro Miura received a stern warning for receiving an invitation to throw games from teammate Kimihiro Satō and not reporting it. On January 29 of that year, Taiyō coach Takashi Suzuki and pitcher Shōji Sakai were barred from playing in the NPB for their involvement with the yakuza. Finally, on February 15, 1971, Lotte Orions pitcher Fumio Narita was suspended for a month for his involvement with bookmakers.

=== Race-fixing ===
On April 22, 1970, a paved flat track motorcycle racer under investigation for rule violations in a race revealed that baseball players were involved in a scheme to fix the results of races. (In Japan, paved flat track motorcycle racing, track cycling, powerboat racing, and horse racing are designated as the kōei kyōgi, or public sports for parimutuel gambling.) Three men were arrested under suspicion of participating in the scheme: Chunichi Dragons pitcher Tsutomu Tanaka, Taiyō Whales pitcher Isao Takayama, and yakuza member Hirotaka Fujinawa. A few weeks later, Kentarō Ogawa, star pitcher for the Dragons, was arrested for taking part in the flat track fixing. Later on in May, Hanshin Tigers infielder Takao Katsuragi was arrested in the flat track scandal. In June, the NPB committee banned Ogawa from baseball for life; they suspended Katsuragi for three months.

On September 8, 1970, Yakult Swallows infielder Takeshi Kuwata (who had been the 1959 rookie of the year) was arrested for his role in the flat track scandal. He would later receive a three-month suspension from the NPB, but his involvement effectively barred him from signing with another team, and he retired at the end of the year.

=== Ikenaga's reinstatement ===
Ikenaga's banning was fiercely contested by both Nishitetsu's front office and Ikenaga's family. His case was not taken up by the NPB until March 2005, when commissioner Yasuchika Negoro and team owners agreed on a bylaw that allowed banned players who have reformed themselves to petition for a removal of the ban. Ikenaga requested a removal soon afterwards, and on April 25, 2005, he was allowed to return to baseball.

== Timeline ==
=== 1969 ===
- October 7, 1969: After Carl Boles reported to the Japanese media regarding teammates at Nishitetsu were involved with match fixing, the club's front office investigates and discovers Masayuki Nagayasu was taking bribes from an organized crime family to throw games. The team announces that Nagayasu will be released after the end of the regular season, just days away.
- October 8: The story is reported in Japanese newspapers.
- November 28: Nagayasu banned from the league for life.

=== 1970 ===
- April 1, 1970: Nagayasu reveals that other players on his former team were also involved in game-fixing. Seven players testify on their involvement: Nagayasu, Masaaki Ikenaga, Yoshinobu Yoda, Akio Masuda, Kimiyasu Murakami, Kazuhide Funada, and Mitsuo Motoi.
- April 22: Flat track motorcycle racer under investigation for rule violations reveals that baseball players are involved in a scheme to fix the results of races, which feature parimutuel wagering as one of the four legal sports in Japan which can be wagered. Tsutomu Tanaka (Chunichi Dragons), Isao Takayama (Taiyō Whales), and yakuza member Hirotaka Fujinawa are arrested.
- May 6: Kentarō Ogawa (Chunichi Dragons) arrested for taking part in the flat track fixing.
- May 9: Toei Flyers pitchers Toshiaki Moriyasu and Mitsugu Tanaka are revealed to be under suspicion of throwing baseball games.
- May 14: Report reveals that Kintetsu Buffaloes front-office official Akira Yano was coerced into throwing games as a player in the 1967 season.
- May 19: Takao Katsuragi (Hanshin Tigers) arrested in the flat track scandal.
- May 25: Commissioner committee issues the following punishments to Nishitetsu players:
  - Masaaki Ikenaga, Yoshinobu Yoda, Akio Masuda: Banned for life
  - Kimiyasu Murakami and Kazuhide Funada: Suspended until the end of the 1970 season
  - Mitsuo Motoi: Reprimand
- June 3: Kentarō Ogawa (Dragons) banned from baseball for life.
- June 15: Akira Yano (Buffaloes front-office) banned from baseball for life.
- June 18: Takao Katsuragi (Tigers) suspended by the commissioner committee for three months.
- July 1: Masahiro Doi (Kintetsu Buffaloes) prosecuted for illegal gambling. Later suspended by the league for a month.
- July 30: Toshiaki Moriyasu (Toei) banned from baseball for life. Mitsugu Tanaka (Toei) receives a warning.
- September 8: Takeshi Kuwata (Yakult Swallows) arrested in the flat track scandal, and was suspended three months after an investigation into the flat track fixing.
- November 30: Yutaka Enatsu (Hanshin Tigers) receives a stern warning from the Central League president due to "involvement with persons in baseball gambling."

=== 1971 ===
- January 11, 1971: Kiyohiro Miura (Nankai Hawks) receives stern warning for receiving an invitation to throw games from teammate Kimihiro Satō and not reporting it.
- January 29: Taiyō coach Takashi Suzuki and pitcher Shōji Sakai barred from playing in the premiere league for their involvement with the Yakuza.
- February 15: Fumio Narita (Lotte Orions) suspended for a month due to his involvement with bookmakers.

== Players implicated ==
=== Warned ===
- Yutaka Enatsu (P), Hanshin Tigers — accused of "involvement with persons in baseball gambling;" received a stern warning from the Central League president
- Kiyohiro Miura (P), Nankai Hawks
- Mitsuo Motoi (IF), Nishitetsu Lions — given a "severe warning"
- Mitsugu Tanaka (P), Toei Flyers

=== Suspended ===
- Masahiro Doi (OF), Kintetsu Buffaloes — prosecuted for illegal gambling; suspended for a month
- Kazuhide Funada (IF), Nishitetsu Lions — suspended until end of 1970 season
- Takao Katsuragi (IF), Hanshin Tigers — arrested in the flat track scandal; suspended for three months
- Kimiyasu Murakami (C), Nishitetsu Lions — suspended until end of 1970 season
- Fumio Narita (P), Lotte Orions — involved with bookmakers; suspended for a month

=== Retired ===
- Takeshi Kuwata (IF), Yakult Swallows — arrested in the flat track scandal; suspended for three months, subsequently blacklisted; eventually retired
- Kimihiro Satō (P), Nankai Hawks — accused of inviting teammate Kiyohiro Miura to throw games; had already left professional baseball after 1969 season
- Isao Takayama (P), Taiyō Whales — accused of manipulation of flat track races; had already left professional baseball after 1966 season

=== Banned for life ===
- Masaaki Ikenaga (P), Nishitetsu Lions (reinstated in 2005)
- Akio Masuda (P), Nishitetsu Lions
- Toshiaki Moriyasu (P), Toei Flyers
- Masayuki Nagayasu (P), Nishitetsu Lions — accused of taking bribes from an organized crime family to throw games. Released after the end of the 1969 season; later banned for life
- Kentarō Ogawa (P), Chunichi Dragons — arrested; accused of fixing flat track races
- Shōji Sakai (P), Taiyō Whales— barred from playing in NPB for involvement with the Yakuza
- Takashi Suzuki (P/coach), Taiyō Whales — barred from playing in NPB for involvement with the Yakuza
- Tsutomu Tanaka (P), Chunichi Dragons — arrested; accused of fixing flat track races
- Akira Yano (P), Kintetsu Buffaloes — former player now an executive coerced into throwing games in the 1967 season
- Yoshinobu Yoda (P), Nishitetsu Lions — accused of game-fixing

== See also ==
- Black Sox Scandal, a similar gambling scandal in Major League Baseball
- Chinese Professional Baseball League, which saw a similar match-fixing scandal in 1997
