= 1964 Japan Series =

Team (Wins)	Managers	Season
Nankai Hawks (4)	Kazuto Tsuruoka	84–63–3 (.571), 3½ GA
Hanshin Tigers (3)	Sadayoshi Fujimoto	80–56–4 (.588), 1 GA
- Dates: October 1–10
- MVP: Joe Stanka (Nankai)
- FSA: Kazuhiro Yamauchi (Hanshin)

Broadcast
- Television: Yomiuri TV (All games), ABC (Games 1 and 5), NHK General TV (Games 1 and 4)
- Radio: NHK Radio 1, ABC, MBS

The 1964 Japan Series was the championship series of Nippon Professional Baseball (NPB) for the 1964 season. The 15th edition of the Series, it was a best-of-seven playoff that featured the Pacific League champion Nankai Hawks against the Central League champion Hanshin Tigers.

It would take 21 years for the Tigers to return to the Japan Series, and in Nankai's case, it took 35 years and an ownership change. This would also be the last Japan Series to be contested by two Kansai-based teams until the 2023 Japan Series. Due to the 1964 Summer Olympics taking place in Tokyo, all games were played at night for the first time ever. It was the only time this had occurred until 1994.

== Summary ==
PL Nankai Hawks (4) vs. CL Hanshin Tigers (3)

Game	Date	Score	Location	Time	Attendance
1	October 1	Nankai Hawks – 2, Hanshin Tigers – 0	Koshien Stadium	2:14	19,904
2	October 2	Nankai Hawks – 2, Hanshin Tigers – 5	Koshien Stadium	2:15	19,190
3	October 4	Hanshin Tigers – 5, Nankai Hawks – 4	Osaka Stadium	2:47	29,932
4	October 5	Hanshin Tigers – 3, Nankai Hawks – 4	Osaka Stadium	2:16	30,107
5	October 6	Hanshin Tigers – 6, Nankai Hawks – 3	Osaka Stadium	2:28	26,962
6	October 9	Nankai Hawks – 4, Hanshin Tigers – 0	Koshien Stadium	1:46	25,471
7	October 10	Nankai Hawks – 3, Hanshin Tigers – 0	Koshien Stadium	2:07	15,172

== Matchups ==
=== Game 1 ===
Thursday, October 1, 1964 7:01 pm (JST) at Koshien Stadium in Nishinomiya, Hyōgo Prefecture
Team	1	2	3	4	5	6	7	8	9	R	H	E
Nankai	0	1	0	0	1	0	0	0	0	2	8	1
Hanshin	0	0	0	0	0	0	0	0	0	0	3	1
WP: Joe Stanka (1–0) LP: Minoru Murayama (0–1)

=== Game 2 ===
Friday, October 2, 1964 7:00 pm (JST) at Koshien Stadium in Nishinomiya, Hyōgo Prefecture
Team	1	2	3	4	5	6	7	8	9	R	H	E
Nankai	0	0	0	0	0	0	1	1	0	2	8	2
Hanshin	1	0	0	1	0	2	0	1	X	5	6	0
WP: Gene Bacque (1–0) LP: Tadashi Sugiura (0–1)

=== Game 3 ===
Monday, October 4, 1964 6:59 pm (JST) at Osaka Stadium in Osaka, Osaka Prefecture
Team	1	2	3	4	5	6	7	8	9	R	H	E
Hanshin	0	1	4	0	0	0	0	0	0	5	9	1
Nankai	0	1	1	0	0	0	1	1	0	4	9	0
WP: Midori Ishikawa (1–0) LP: Joe Stanka (1–1); Home runs: HAN: Eiji Fujii 2 (2); NAN: Johnny Logan (1), Kent Hadley (1)

=== Game 4 ===
Monday, October 5, 1964 7:00 pm (JST) at Osaka Stadium in Osaka, Osaka Prefecture
Team	1	2	3	4	5	6	7	8	9	R	H	E
Hanshin	1	0	0	0	0	2	0	0	0	3	6	1
Nankai	0	0	0	1	2	0	0	0	1X	4	7	1
WP: Akitada Niiyama (1–0) LP: Minoru Murayama (0–2); Home runs: HAN: Kazuhiro Yamauchi 2 (2); NAN: Kent Hadley (2)

=== Game 5 ===
Tuesday, October 6, 1964 7:00 pm (JST) at Osaka Stadium in Osaka, Osaka Prefecture
Team	1	2	3	4	5	6	7	8	9	R	H	E
Hanshin	0	3	0	1	0	0	2	0	0	6	12	0
Nankai	0	0	0	0	0	0	3	0	0	3	10	1
WP: Peter Burnside (1–0) LP: Mutsuo Minagawa (0–1); Home runs: HAN: Yoshinori Tsuji (1), Motoo Ando (1); NAN: Nobushige Morishita (1)

=== Game 6 ===
Friday, October 9, 1964 6:59 pm (JST) at Koshien Stadium in Nishinomiya, Hyōgo Prefecture
Team	1	2	3	4	5	6	7	8	9	R	H	E
Nankai	0	2	0	1	0	0	0	0	1	4	11	0
Hanshin	0	0	0	0	0	0	0	0	0	0	2	1
WP: Joe Stanka (2–1) LP: Gene Bacque (1–1)

=== Game 7 ===
Saturday, October 10, 1964 6:59 pm (JST) at Koshien Stadium in Nishinomiya, Hyōgo Prefecture
Team	1	2	3	4	5	6	7	8	9	R	H	E
Nankai	0	2	0	1	0	0	0	0	0	3	9	0
Hanshin	0	0	0	0	0	0	0	0	0	0	5	1
WP: Joe Stanka (3–1) LP: Minoru Murayama (0–3)

Joe Stanka was tabbed to start his fourth game of the series. He dominated once again for his third win of the series that saw him throw a five-hit shutout on 110 pitches as the Hawks won the series. For his performance in the series of three complete games with allowing just four earned runs in 29.1 total innings with 21 strikeouts, Stanka was named Japan Series MVP.

== See also ==
- 1964 World Series
