= Shigeru Takada =

Japanese baseball player, manager, and general manager

Shigeru Takada 高田 繁
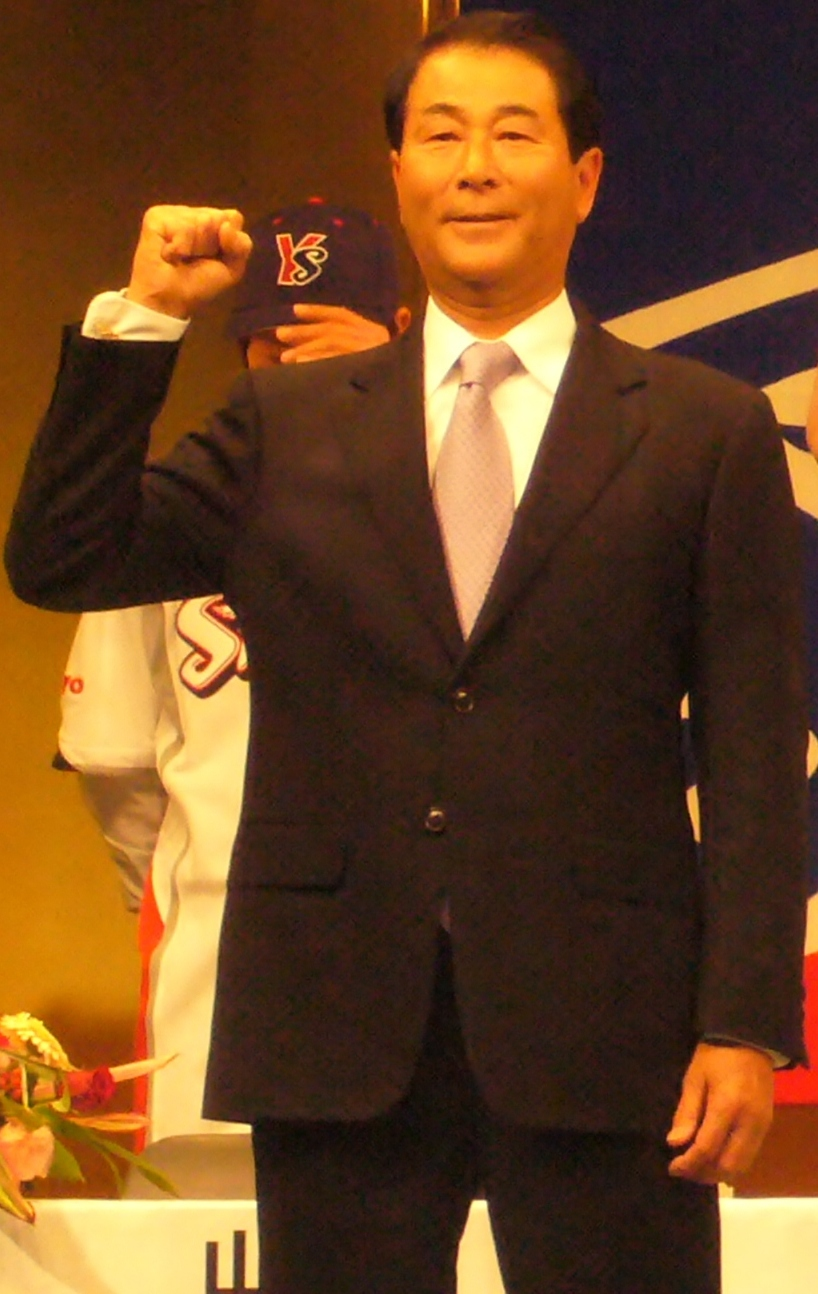
- Born: July 24, 1945 (age 81); Osaka, Japan
- Batted: Right Threw: Right

NPB debut
- April 6, 1968, for the Yomiuri Giants

Last appearance
- October 12, 1980, for the Yomiuri Giants

NPB statistics
- Batting average: .273
- Hits: 1384
- RBIs: 499
- Games managed: 854
- Win–loss record: 385–433
- Winning %: .471
- Stats at Baseball Reference

Teams
- As player: Yomiuri Giants (1968–1980); As coach: Yomiuri Giants (1992, 1996–2001); As manager: Nippon-Ham Fighters (1985–1988); Tokyo Yakult Swallows (2008–2010); As General Manager: Yokohama DeNA BayStars (2011–2018)

Career highlights and awards
- 1968 Central League Rookie of the Year

Shigeru Takada (高田 繁; born July 24, 1945 in Osaka, Japan) is a former general manager of the Yokohama DeNA BayStars, and former manager of the Hokkaido Nippon-Ham Fighters and the Tokyo Yakult Swallows in Japan's Nippon Professional Baseball. He was previously an outfielder for the Yomiuri Giants and won the 1968 Central League Rookie of the Year award.
