= Gene Bacque =

American baseball player (1937–2019)

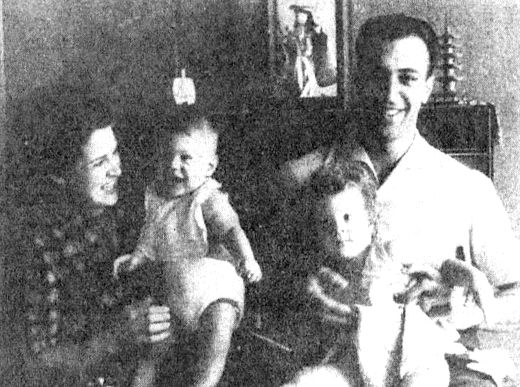
- Pitcher
- Born: August 12, 1937; Lafayette, Louisiana, U.S.
- Died: September 14, 2019 (aged 82)
- Batted: Right Threw: Right

NPB debut
- August, 1962, for the Hanshin Tigers

Last NPB appearance
- September, 1969, for the Kintetsu Buffaloes

NPB statistics
- Win–loss record: 100–80
- ERA: 2.34
- Strikeouts: 825

Teams
- Hanshin Tigers (1962–1968); Kintetsu Buffaloes (1969)

Career highlights and awards
- 1964 Eiji Sawamura Award; 1965 no-hitter

Gene Bacque (August 12, 1937 – September 14, 2019) was an American professional baseball pitcher who played in Nippon Professional Baseball for the Hanshin Tigers and Kintetsu Buffaloes.

== Biography ==
=== Career ===
Bacque graduated from the University of Southwestern Louisiana (now the University of Louisiana at Lafayette), and joined the minor league Hawaii Islanders. He was cut shortly afterwards, and a Japanese sportswriter encouraged him to try out in Japan.

He was signed by the Hanshin Tigers in August 1962. Bacque was not given a translator when he first joined the Tigers, and he and his family of four had to live in a poor neighborhood in Japan. However, he went on to learn fluent Japanese, and became respected by teammates as one of the best non-Japanese players ever to play on the Tigers.

He learned a slider from Japanese Hall of Famer Masaaki Koyama, and improved his knuckleball to enter the starting rotation. He and Minoru Murayama became the crux of the Tigers pitching staff during the 1960s.

Bacque marked a 29–9 record with a 1.89 ERA in 1964, leading the league in wins and ERA to become the first non-Japanese player to receive the Eiji Sawamura Award. The Tigers won the Central League championship that year, and Bacque pitched in the sixth game of the Japan Series against Joe Stanka of the Nankai Hawks (the Hawks won, 4–0).

Bacque threw a no-hitter in 1965 against the Yomiuri Giants (becoming the first foreign pitcher in the modern era of Japanese baseball [since the formation of the Central and Pacific Leagues in 1950] to do so), and won over 10 games for five years in a row from 1964 to 1968. In September 1968, Bacque broke his right thumb during a brawl with the Giants, and missed the rest of the season. He was traded to the Kintetsu Buffaloes in 1969, but failed to make a comeback, going 0–7 that year. He announced his retirement during the off-season. He is tied with Joe Stanka for the most career victories among American pitchers in Japan.

=== Retirement ===
After retiring, Bacque worked as an industrial arts teacher at a junior high school in Scott, Louisiana, and managed his own ranch. He often traveled to Japan to meet with his former teammates. Bacque died following complications from abdominal aneurysm surgery on September 14, 2019.

== See also ==
- American expatriate baseball players in Japan
