= 1966 Japan Series =

Team (Wins)	Managers	Season
Yomiuri Giants (4)	Tetsuharu Kawakami	89–41–4 (.685), 13 GA
Nankai Hawks (2)	Kazuto Tsuruoka	79–51–3 (.608), 4 GA
- Dates: October 12–19
- MVP: Isao Shibata (Yomiuri)
- FSA: Taisuke Watanabe (Nankai)

The 1966 Japan Series was the championship series of Nippon Professional Baseball for the 1966 season. The 17th edition of the Series, it was a best-of-seven playoff that matched the Central League champion Yomiuri Giants against the Pacific League champion Nankai Hawks. This was a rematch of the previous year's Japan Series, which the Giants won. Yomiuri again defeated Nankai, this time in six games, to win their second consecutive championship.

== Summary ==
CL Yomiuri Giants (4) vs. PL Nankai Hawks (2)

Game	Date	Score	Location	Time	Attendance
1	October 12	Yomiuri Giants – 12, Nankai Hawks – 5	Korakuen Stadium	2:52	27,145
2	October 13	Yomiuri Giants – 2, Nankai Hawks – 5	Korakuen Stadium	2:39	27,395
3	October 16	Nankai Hawks – 2, Yomiuri Giants – 3	Osaka Stadium	2:08	29,978
4	October 17	Nankai Hawks – 1, Yomiuri Giants – 8	Osaka Stadium	2:35	30,178
5	October 18	Nankai Hawks – 4, Yomiuri Giants – 3	Osaka Stadium	3:50	19,791
6	October 19	Yomiuri Giants – 4, Nankai Hawks – 0	Korakuen Stadium	2:14	29,112

== See also ==
- 1966 World Series
