= Hiromi Makihara's perfect game =

1994 Hiromi Makihara's perfect game
- Teams: Hiroshima Toyo Carp; Yomiuri Giants
- Date: May 18, 1994
- Venue: Fukuoka Dome
- City: Fukuoka

Hiromi Makihara's perfect game is a perfect game pitched by Hiromi Makihara of the Yomiuri Giants against the Hiroshima Toyo Carp on May 18, 1994, as the Giants defeated the Carp 6–0. It was the 15th perfect game (Note: In Japan, perfect games achieved by multiple pitchers are not considered as official perfect games. This game is considered by NPB standards as the 15th perfect game in NPB history, while the 2007 Japan Series Game 5 perfect game by Daisuke Yamai and Hitoki Iwase is considered as the 16th recent perfect game in NPB history by international standards.) in Nippon Professional Baseball (NPB) history, and the second by a member of the Giants. Rōki Sasaki's perfect game is the 17th NPB perfect game, and the most recent in the league.

== Statistics ==
=== Line score ===
Team	1	2	3	4	5	6	7	8	9	R	H	E
Carp	0	0	0	0	0	0	0	0	0	0	0	2
Giants	2	3	0	0	0	0	0	1	x	6	8	0
WP: Hiromi Makihara (4–1) LP: Kazuhisa Kawaguchi (0–5)

== See also ==
- List of Nippon Professional Baseball perfect games
