= Yutaka Enatsu =

Japanese baseball player (1948–2026)

Yutaka Enatsu 江夏 豊
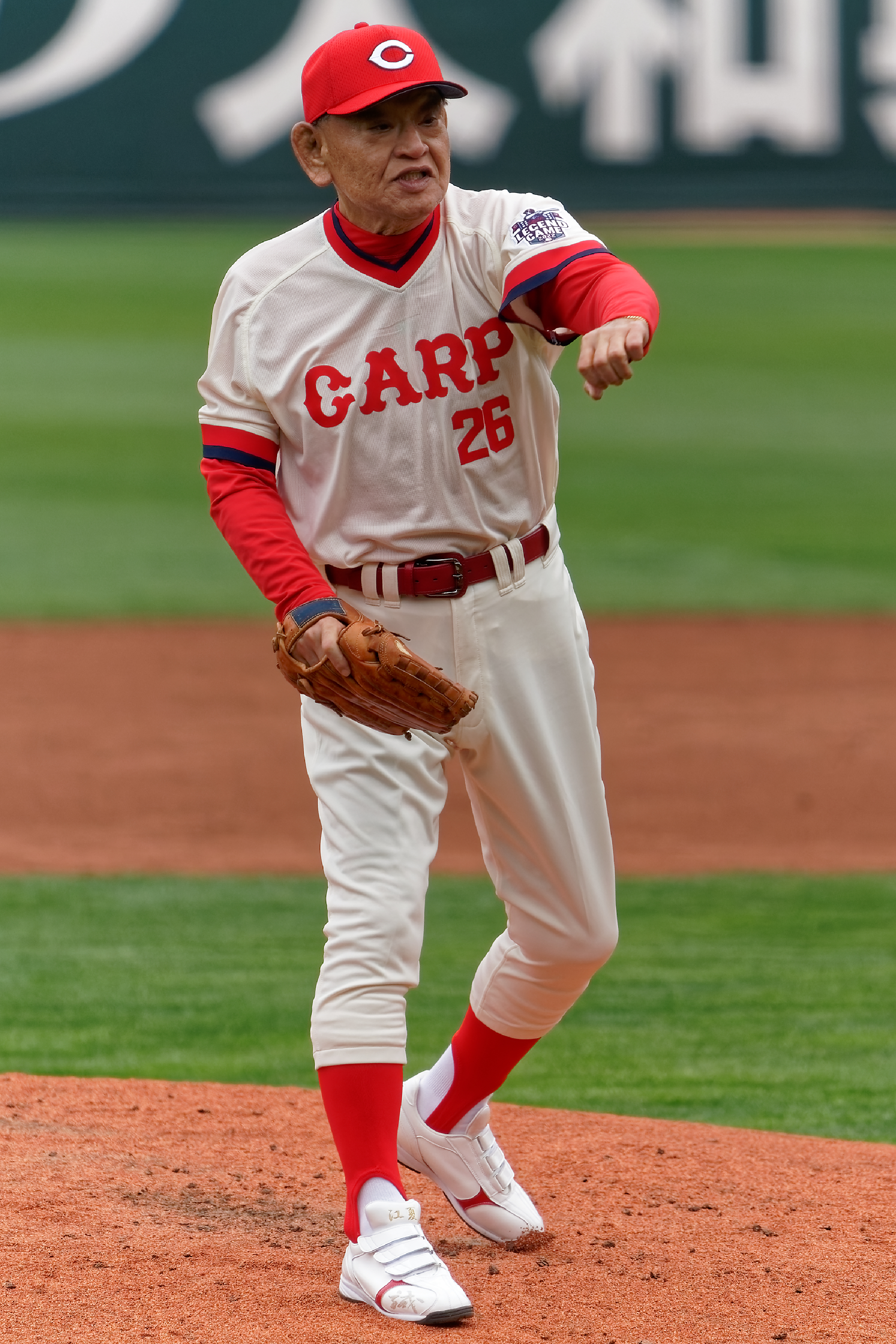
- Enatsu in 2022
- Pitcher
- Born: May 15, 1948; Nara Prefecture, Allied-occupied Japan
- Died: November 17, 2026 (aged 78); Tokyo, Japan
- Batted: Left Threw: Left

NPB debut
- 1967, for the Hanshin Tigers

Last appearance
- July 12, 1984, for the Seibu Lions

NPB statistics
- Win–loss record: 206–158
- Saves: 193
- Earned run average: 2.49
- Strikeouts: 2,987
- Stats at Baseball Reference

Teams
- Hanshin Tigers (1967–1975); Nankai Hawks (1976–1977); Hiroshima Toyo Carp (1978–1980); Nippon-Ham Fighters (1981–1983); Seibu Lions (1984)

Career highlights and awards
- Central League MVP (1979); Pacific League MVP (1981); 2x Japan Series champion (1979, 1980); Best Nine Award (1968); Eiji Sawamura Award (1968)

Yutaka Enatsu (江夏 豊, Enatsu Yutaka; May 15, 1948 – November 17, 2026) was a Japanese professional baseball pitcher regarded as one of the best Japanese strikeout pitchers of all-time. In 1968, he recorded 401 strikeouts, which is still the world record.

Enatsu was a big player in the Black Mist Scandal which embroiled Japanese baseball from 1969 to 1971. In November 1970 he received a stern warning from the Central League president due to "involvement with persons in baseball gambling."

He recorded nine consecutive strikeouts in one of the 1971 All-Star games, and 15 consecutive strikeouts in three of the All-Star games between 1970 and 1971. His consecutive strikeouts were broken up by Katsuya Nomura. The two records are still unbroken.

A starting pitcher for the first part of his career, in 1977 he became a relief specialist, altogether accumulating 193 saves.

While playing with the Hiroshima Toyo Carp in 1979, Enatsu was the Central League MVP, as he compiled a 9–5 record with a 2.67 ERA and 117 strikeouts in 104-2/3 innings. That year the Carp won the Central League pennant and the Japan Series.

In 1981, with the Nippon-Ham Fighters, Enatsu was the Pacific League MVP, garnering 25 saves and a 2.82 ERA, as the Fighters won the Pacific League pennant. He is one of just two players to win the MVP in both leagues of NPB and the only one to do so until Michihiro Ogasawara.

Enatsu joined the Milwaukee Brewers for spring training in 1985 at age 36 in an attempt to play Major League Baseball. Enatsu finished spring training with a 4.91 ERA in 11 innings and was among the team's final cuts before the season. He ranks fifth all-time in NPB history for strikeouts with 2,987. He has the most strikeouts of any player not in the Japanese Baseball Hall of Fame.

== In popular culture ==
Enatsu is a major shadow-figure in Yōko Ogawa's novel The Housekeeper and the Professor (Hakase no ai shita sūshiki, 博士の愛した数式, 2003).

== Death ==
Enatsu died at a hospital in Tokyo, on November 17, 2026, from complications of chronic diabetes that he had suffered for a few years, which had forced him in a wheelchair. He was 78.
