= Kentarō Ogawa =

Japanese baseball player (1934–1995)

- Pitcher
- Born: January 12, 1934; Kurume, Fukuoka, Japan
- Died: October 8, 1995 (aged 61)
- Batted: right Threw: right

Nippon Professional Baseball debut
- 1964, for the Chunichi Dragons

Last appearance
- May, 1970, for the Chunichi Dragons

NPB statistics
- Win–loss: 95-66
- ERA: 2.62
- Strikeouts: 739

Teams
- Chunichi Dragons (1964–1970)

Career highlights and awards
- 1967 Eiji Sawamura Award

Kentarō Ogawa (January 12, 1934 – October 8, 1995) was a Japanese professional baseball player. A right-handed submarine-style pitcher, he played in Japan for the Chunichi Dragons. Ogawa was one of the top pitchers in Nippon Professional Baseball before a scandal derailed his career. During his prime years from 1965–1969, Ogawa won 93 games, including winning 20 games or more twice.

== Biography ==
Ogawa attended Fukuoka Prefectural Meizen High School, graduating in 1954. He signed with the Toei Flyers, but instead of pursuing professional baseball, he went to work in the private sector.

Deciding to return to professional baseball at age 30, he made his NPB debut for the Chunichi Dragons in 1964. In 1967 he went 29-12 with a 2.51 ERA and 16 complete games, winning the Eiji Sawamura Award. The next year he led the league in losses with 20, while still compiling a low 3.27 ERA and 9 complete games. In 1969 he returned to form, winning 20 games for the second time.

=== Black Mist scandal ===
In 1970 Ogawa started the season 2–1 with a 1.71 ERA.

On May 6 of that year, Ogawa was arrested for taking part in match fixing involving both NPB baseball and flat track motorcycle racing. He was also implicated in baseball game-fixing. On June 6, 1970, the NPB commissioner committee banned Ogawa for life.

== See also ==
- Masaaki Ikenaga
- Black Sox Scandal
- Pete Rose
