= Hiromi Makihara =

Japanese baseball player

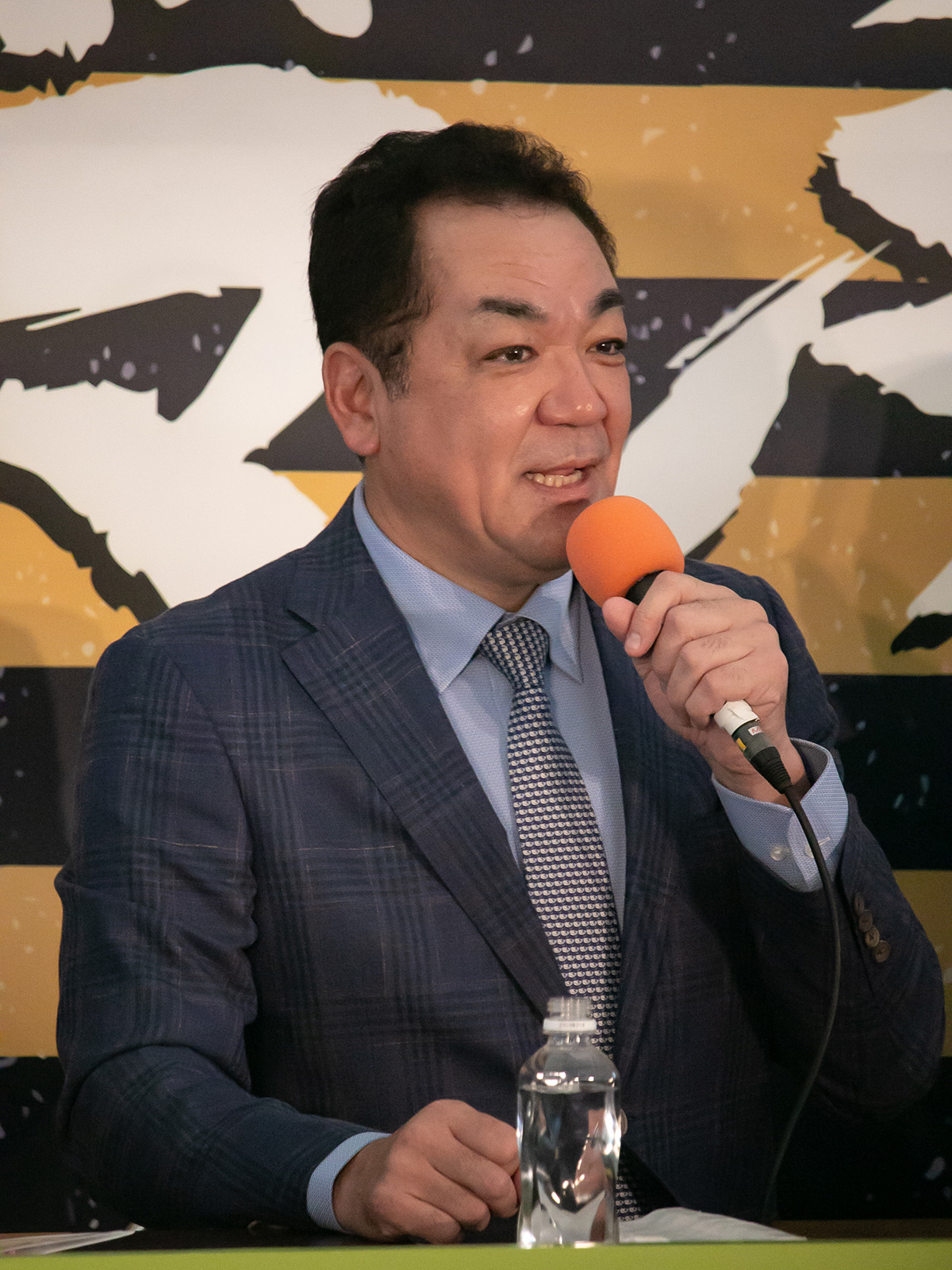
- Makihara in 2018
- Pitcher
- Born: August 11, 1963 (age 63); Handa, Aichi, Japan
- Batted: Right Threw: Right

NPB debut
- April 16, 1983, for the Yomiuri Giants

Last NPB appearance
- September 30, 2001, for the Yomiuri Giants

NPB statistics
- Win–loss: 159–128
- Earned run average: 3.19
- Shutouts: 35
- Innings pitched: 2,485
- Strikeouts: 2,111
- Saves: 56
- Stats at Baseball Reference

Teams
- Yomiuri Giants (1982–2001)

Career highlights and awards
- Nippon Professional Baseball Rookie of the Year Award (1983); 6× NPB All-Star (1988, 1989, 1991, 1992, 1994, 1999); Pitched a perfect game (May 18, 1994); 3x Japan Series champion (1989, 1994, 2000)

Hiromi Makihara (槙原 寛己, Makihara Hiromi) (born August 11, 1963) is a Japanese former Nippon Professional Baseball pitcher. He was a six-time Central League All-Star, won Rookie of the Year honors, and pitched a perfect game in a 19-year career with the Yomiuri Giants.
