= Isao Shibata =

Japanese baseball player (born 1944)

- Outfielder
- Born: February 8, 1944 (age 82); Yokohama, Japan
- Batted: Both Threw: Right

debut
- 1962, for the Yomiuri Giants

Last appearance
- 1981, for the Yomiuri Giants

Career statistics
- Batting average: .267
- Hits: 2,018
- Stolen bases: 579
- Home runs: 194
- Runs batted in: 708

Teams
- As player: Yomiuri Giants (1962–1981); As coach: Yomiuri Giants (1982–1985)

Career highlights and awards
- Central League stolen base champion (1966, 1967, 1969); Japan Series champion (1963, 1965-1973, 1981)

Isao Shibata (柴田 勲, Shibata Isao) (born February 8, 1944) is a former professional baseball outfielder who played his entire career with the Yomiuri Giants from 1962 to 1981.

A speedy switch-hitter, he won the Japan Series Most Valuable Player Award in 1966, after he hit .565 with 13 hits in the 1966 Japan Series. With 579 career stolen bases, Shibata is third on the all-time Nippon Professional Baseball list. With more than 2,000 career hits, Shibata is a member of Meikyukai, otherwise known as the Golden Players Club.

== See also ==
- List of Nippon Professional Baseball career hits leaders
