= Tsutomu Tanaka =

Japanese baseball player (born 1939)

- Pitcher
- Born: October 10, 1939 (age 86); Ōmuta, Fukuoka, Japan
- Batted: Right Threw: Right

Nippon Professional Baseball debut
- August 16, 1961, for the Nishitetsu Lions

Last appearance
- September 4, 1969, for the Chunichi Dragons

NPB statistics
- Win–loss: 103–89
- ERA: 2.81
- Strikeouts: 1152

Teams
- Nishitetsu Lions (1961–1967); Chunichi Dragons (1968–1969)

Career highlights and awards
- Perfect game (1966); Best Nine Award, 1966

Tsutomu Tanaka (田中 勉, Tanaka Tsutomu; born October 10, 1939) was a Japanese professional baseball player. A right-handed pitcher, he played in Japan for the Nishitetsu Lions and the Chunichi Dragons. Tanaka was a top pitcher in Nippon Professional Baseball shortly before scandals derailed his career. A 23-game winner in 1966, he also is one of the few NPB pitchers to ever throw a perfect game.

== Biography ==
Tanaka attended Miike Kougyou High School. He made his NPB debut for the Nishitetsu Lions in 1961, becoming a mainstay by 1963, when he went 17-8 with a 2.66 ERA. That year he was eighth in the Pacific League in ERA, tying for the shutout lead with four.

After his successful 1963 season, Tanaka was named the Lions' opening day starter for four consecutive years, from 1964 to 1967. In 1964 and 1965, Tanaka had problems with his control, allowing 102 walks and 84 walks, respectively, both of which were the most in his league. On May 12, 1966, Tanaka threw a perfect game against the Nankai Hawks, defeating them 2–0 in Heiwadai Stadium. He finished the 1966 season 23-12 with a 2.34 ERA (seventh in the league), a league-leading 217 strikeouts, and 13 complete games, winning a Best Nine Award.

Tanaka only won 12 games in 1967 despite a 2.17 ERA (fourth-best in the league) and a league-leading six shutouts. He was traded to the Chunichi Dragons in 1968 (for first baseman-outfielder Isao Hirono), where Tanaka went 11-12 with a 3.41 ERA, and 8-6 with a 3.31 ERA in 1969.

Tanaka retired following the 1969 season.

=== Black Mist scandal ===
Following the 1969 season, the Nishitetsu Lions front office discovered pitcher Masayuki Nagayasu taking bribes from an organized crime family to intentionally lose games. The team announced that Nagayasu would be released after the end of the season. Late in November 1969, the committee of commissioners presiding over the league at the time voted to ban Nagayasu from the league for life, the first time any player had been banned from Japanese baseball. In April 1970, Nagayasu revealed that other players on his former team were also involved in game-fixing. The league summoned seven players to testify about their involvement, including team ace Masaaki Ikenaga. Ikenaga claimed to be uninvolved, despite having received 1 million Japanese yen from former Lions teammate Tanaka as an invitation to cheat. (Ikenaga and Tanaka had been teammates for three seasons on the Lions, from 1964-1967.)

Later that same month, a flat-track motorcycle racer under investigation for rule violations in a race revealed that baseball players were involved in a scheme to fix the results of races. Tanaka was one of a number of current and former players arrested under suspicion of participating in the scheme. As a result of his involvement in both game-fixing and race-fixing, and even though he had already retired, Tanaka was banned from NPB for life.

In his later life, Tanaka operated a restaurant and went into health food sales.

== See also ==
- Black Sox Scandal
- Pete Rose
