= Toshio Naka =

Japanese baseball player (1936–2023)

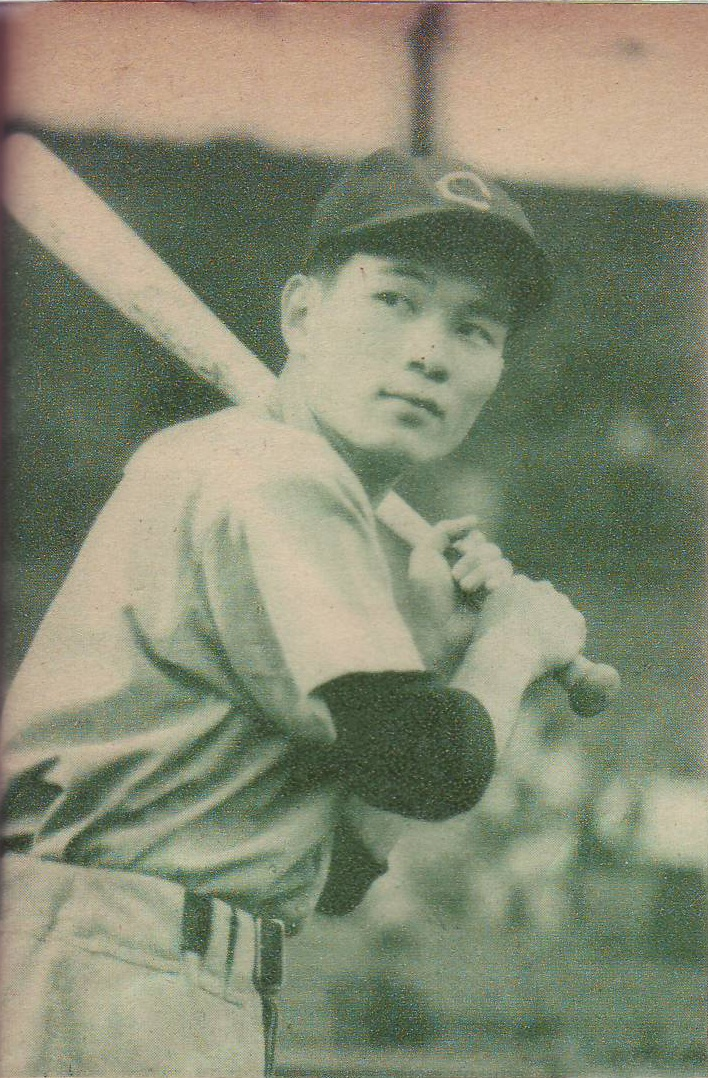
- Outfielder
- Born: 28 April 1936; Maebashi, Japan
- Died: 10 October 2023 (aged 87)
- Batted: Left Threw: Right

debut
- 1955, for the Chunichi Dragons

Last appearance
- 1959, for the Chunichi Dragons

Career statistics
- Batting average: .277
- Home runs: 139
- RBI: 541
- Stats at Baseball Reference

Teams
- Chunichi Dragons (1955–1972)

Toshio Naka (中 利夫, Naka Toshio; 28 April 1936 – 10 October 2023) was a Japanese baseball outfielder and manager. Naka played with the Chunichi Dragons from 1955 to 1972, and later managed the team from 1978 to 1980. He led the Central League with a .343 batting average in 1967.

== Personal life ==
Naka died on 10 October 2023, at the age of 87.
