= Masahiro Doi =

Japanese baseball player and coach (born 1943)

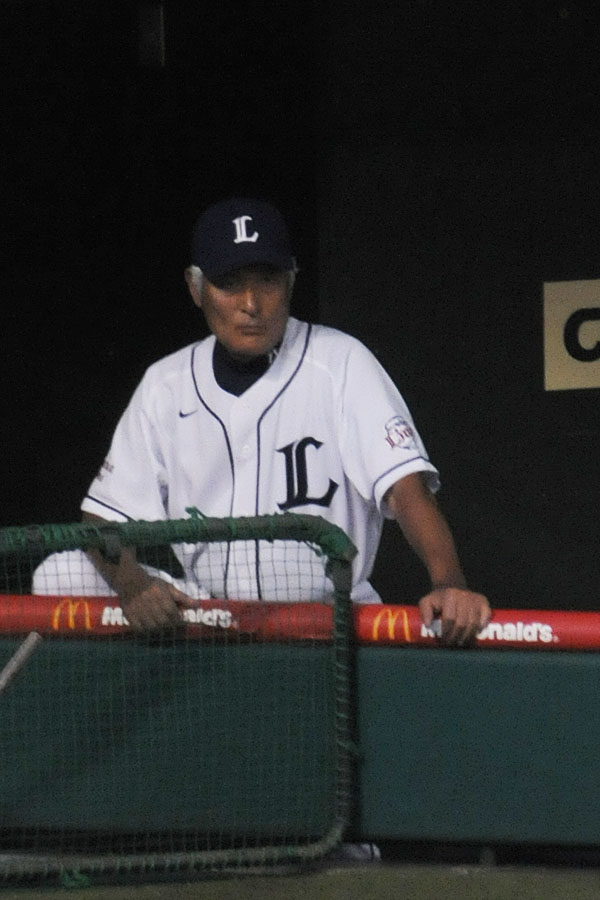
- Outfielder/Batting Coach
- Born: December 8, 1943 (age 82); Kashiwara, Osaka, Japan
- Batted: Right Threw: Right

debut
- 1962, for the Kintetsu Buffaloes

Last appearance
- 1981, for the Seibu Lions

Career statistics
- Batting average: .282
- Home runs: 465
- Hits: 2,452
- Runs batted in: 1,400

Teams
- As player: Kintetsu Buffaloes (1962–1974); Taiheiyo Club / Crown Lighter / Seibu Lions (1975–1981); As coach: Seibu Lions (1985–1989); Samsung Lions (1992); Seibu Lions (1996–1999, 2004–2007, 2011–2012); Chunichi Dragons (2017–2018)

Career highlights and awards
- 15x All-Star (1963–1969, 1971, 1973–1976, 1978–1980); 3x Best Nine Award (1967, 1968, 1978)

Masahiro Doi (土井 正博, Doi Masahiro) (born December 8, 1943) is a Japanese former professional baseball outfielder in Nippon Professional Baseball. He played for the Kintetsu Buffaloes from 1962 to 1974 and the Taiheiyo Club / Crown Lighter / Seibu Lions from 1975 to 1981. In a career that spanned 20 years, the slugger was selected to 15 All-Star games and was named to the Best Nine Award three times (1967, 1968, 1978). Over four decades after his retirement, Doi ranks 10th all-time in hits in Japanese baseball history with 2,452.

He last served as the batting coach for the Chunichi Dragons.

== Career ==
Born in Kashiwara, Osaka, Doi attended Daitetsu High School, dropping out before graduation.

Doi led the Pacific League in hits in 1964 and 1967 with 168 and 147 respectively. He was a 1968 Best Nine Award-winner as an outfielder.

Doi was a bit player in the Black Mist Scandal, which embroiled NPB from 1969–1971. In July 1970 Doi was prosecuted for illegal gambling. He was later suspended by the league for a month.

The following season was the best of Doi's career, as he hit .309 with 40 home runs, 113 RBI, and a .998 OPS.

In 1975, his first season with the Lions, Doi led the Pacific League in home runs, with 34.

Doi finished his career among the all-time NPB leaders with 465 home runs (11th all-time) and 1,400 RBI (12th all-time). With more than 2,000 career hits, he became a member of the Meikyukai, or the Golden Players Club. Doi retired in 1981, the season prior to the Lions reaching (and winning) the Japan Series. He later served as a coach for the team in four different stints.

== See also ==
- List of top Nippon Professional Baseball home run hitters
- List of Nippon Professional Baseball players with 1,000 runs batted in
- List of Nippon Professional Baseball career hits leaders
