= Masaaki Ikenaga =

Japanese baseball player (1946–2022)

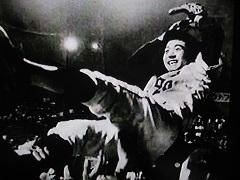
- Masaaki Ikenaga
- Pitcher
- Born: August 18, 1946; Hohoku, Toyoura District, Yamaguchi, Japan
- Died: September 25, 2022 (aged 76)
- Batted: right Threw: right

Nippon Professional Baseball debut
- April, 1965, for the Nishitetsu Lions

Last appearance
- May, 1970, for the Nishitetsu Lions

NPB statistics
- Win–loss: 103–65
- ERA: 2.36
- Strikeouts: 793

Teams
- Nishitetsu Lions (1965–1970)

Career highlights and awards
- 1965 Pacific League Rookie of the Year; 5x All-Star; 1967 Pacific League leader in wins and complete games

Masaaki Ikenaga (池永 正明, Ikenaga Masaaki; August 18, 1946 – September 25, 2022) was a Japanese professional baseball player. A right-handed pitcher, he played in Japan for the Nishitetsu Lions. Ikenaga was one of the top pitchers in Nippon Professional Baseball before a scandal derailed his career at age 23. Before being implicated in the Black Mist Scandal, he made five consecutive All-Star teams at the beginning of his career, and was in the top 10 in ERA every season of his career.

== Biography ==
Ikenaga attended Shimonoseki Shogyo High School, with his school baseball team winning the spring 1963 Koshien Tournament.

He made his debut for the Nishitetsu Lions in 1965 at age 18, winning 20 games (3rd in the league) with a 2.27 ERA (5th in the league), and establishing himself as the team's ace. That year he made the Pacific League (PL) All-Star team, and was named the PL Rookie of the Year.

In 1966 he posted a 15–14 record with a 2.18 ERA, again fifth in the PL.

1967 was Ikenaga's most productive season, as he went 23–14 with a 2.31 ERA. He led the PL in wins, complete games (19), shutouts (6) and innings pitched (335-1/3).

1968 saw Ikenaga go 23–13, with a 2.45 ERA (3rd in the PL). The 1969 season saw Ikenaga post an 18–11 record and a 2.57 ERA, finishing 3rd in the league in wins.

=== Black Mist scandal ===
In 1970 Ikenaga started the season 4–3 with a 2.60 ERA.

On April 1 of that year, disgraced former Lions pitcher Masayuki Nagayasu gave an exclusive tape-recorded interview to the Shūkan Post newspaper that revealed other players on his former team were also involved in game-fixing during the 1969 season. Of the seven players summoned by the league to testify on their involvement, one of them was Ikenaga. Ikenaga admitted taking money from gamblers via fellow pitcher Tsutomu Tanaka of the Chunichi Dragons (a former teammate — Tanaka pitched for Nishitetsu from 1961–1967), but said he did not let it affect his play. (Nonetheless, he did not return the 1 million yen he had received from Tanaka.)

On May 25, the NPB commissioner committee banned Ikenaga for life. Ikenaga's banning was fiercely contested by both Nishitetsu's front office and Ikenaga's own family. He finished his NPB career with a 103–65 record and a 2.36 ERA.

==== Reinstatement ====
Ikenaga's case was not taken up by NPB until March 2005, when commissioner Yasuchika Negoro and owners agreed on a bylaw that allowed banned players who have reformed themselves to petition for a removal of the ban. This occurred after a nine-year campaign by baseball fans and residents of his hometown.

Ikenaga requested a removal soon afterwards, and on April 25, 2005, he was allowed to return to baseball.

On September 25, 2022, Ikenaga died at the age of 76.

== In popular culture ==
The character Hidehiko Hayakawa in the 1998 anime series Princess Nine is based on Ikenaga.

== See also ==
- Black Sox Scandal
- Pete Rose
