= Shinichi Eto =

Japanese baseball player (1937–2008)

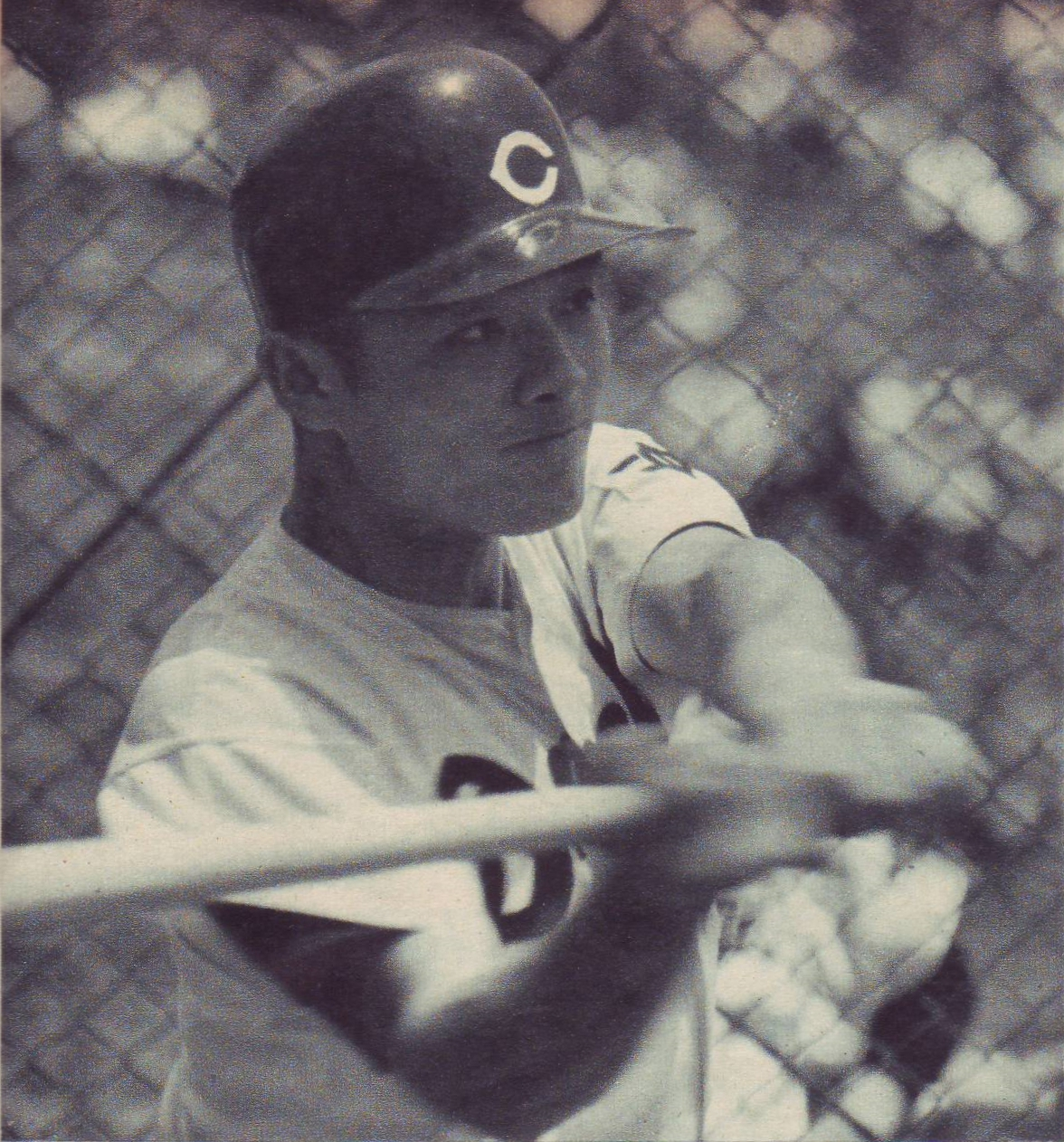
- Outfielder / First baseman
- Born: October 6, 1937; Yamaga, Kumamoto, Japan
- Died: February 28, 2008 (aged 70); Tokyo, Japan
- Batted: Right Threw: Right

debut
- 1959, for the Chunichi Dragons

Last appearance
- 1976, for the Lotte Orions

Career statistics
- Batting average: .287
- Home runs: 367
- Hits: 2,057
- Runs batted in: 1,189
- Stats at Baseball Reference

Teams
- As player: Chunichi Dragons (1959–1969); Lotte Orions (1970–1971); Taiyo Whales (1972–1974); Taiheiyo Club Lions (1975); Lotte Orions (1976); As manager: Taiheiyo Club Lions (1975)

Career highlights and awards
- 2× Central League batting champion; 6× Best Nine Award (1961, 1963, 1964, 1965, 1966, 1968)

Member of the Japanese

Baseball Hall of Fame
- Induction: 2010

Shinichi Eto (江藤 愼一, Shinichi Eto; October 6, 1937 – February 28, 2008) was a Japanese professional baseball outfielder and first baseman in Nippon Professional Baseball.

Eto played for the Chunichi Dragons from 1959 to 1969, where he was the Central League batting champion in 1964 and 1965 (hitting .323 and .336 respectively). In addition, he was a Best Nine Award-winner as an outfielder five times: 1961, 1963, 1964, 1965, 1966, and 1968.

Eto moved to the Lotte Orions from 1970 to 1971 and the Taiyo Whales from 1972 to 1974. He was the player-manager of the Taiheiyo Club Lions in 1975. He returned to the Lotte Orions for his final season in 1976.

Eto died in 2008 of liver cancer at the age of 70. He was posthumously inducted into the Japanese Baseball Hall of Fame in 2010.

== See also ==
- List of top Nippon Professional Baseball home run hitters
- List of Nippon Professional Baseball players with 1,000 runs batted in
- List of Nippon Professional Baseball career hits leaders
