= Minoru Murayama =

Japanese baseball player (1936–1998)

Minoru Murayama 村山 実
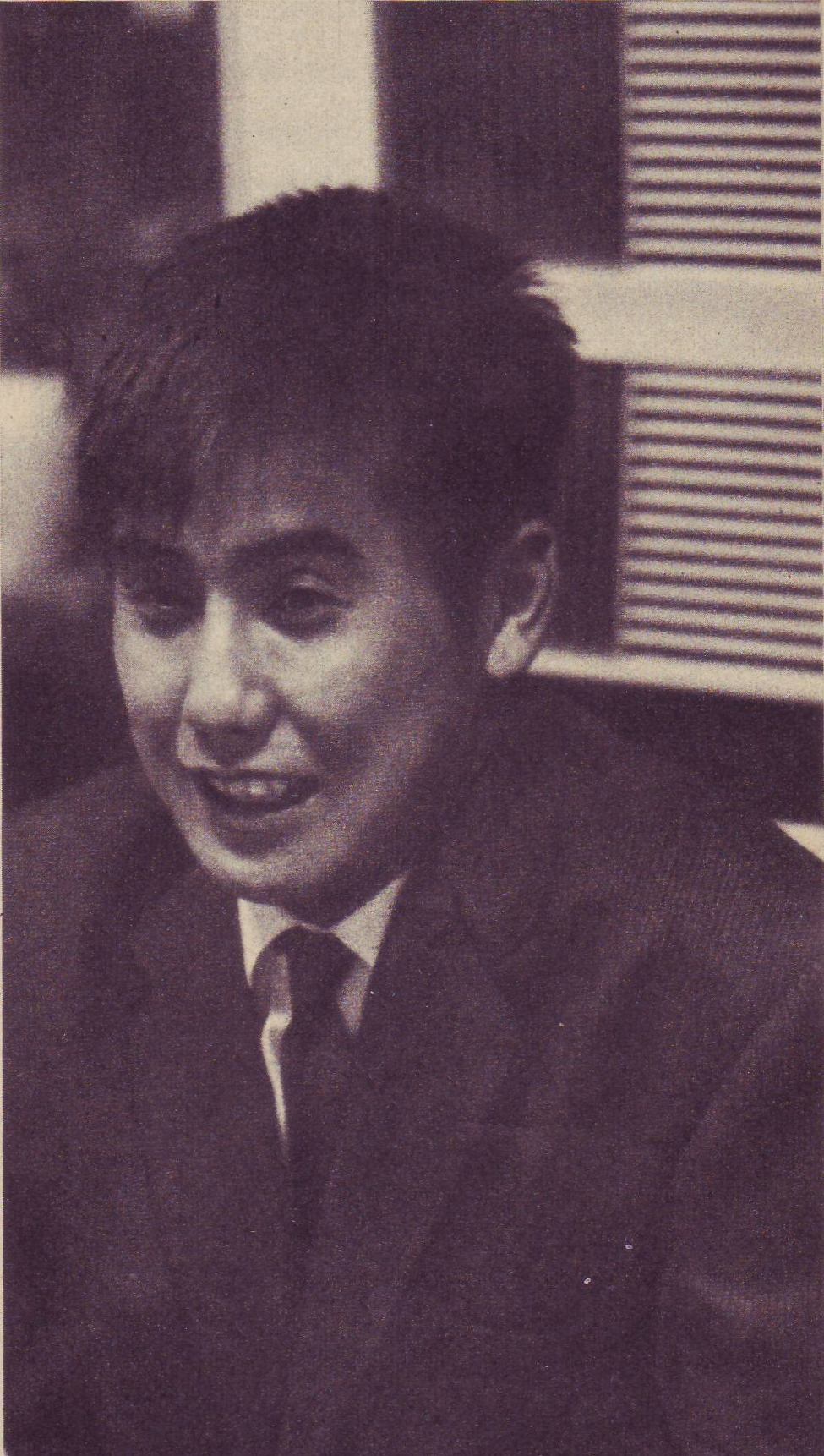
- Pitcher / Manager
- Born: December 10, 1936; Amagasaki, Hyōgo
- Died: August 22, 1998 (aged 61)
- Batted: Right Threw: Right

NPB debut
- April 14, 1959, for the Osaka Tigers

Last appearance
- March 21, 1973, for the Hanshin Tigers

NPB statistics
- Win–loss: 222–147
- Earned run average: 2.09
- Shutouts: 55
- Innings pitched: 3,050.1
- Strikeouts: 2,271

Career statistics
- Batting average: .176
- Hits: 165
- Home runs: 1
- Run batted in: 51
- Stats at Baseball Reference

Teams
- As player: Osaka Tigers/Hanshin Tigers (1959–1972); As manager: Hanshin Tigers (1970–1972, 1988–1989)

Career highlights and awards
- 3x Eiji Sawamura Award (1959, 1965, 1966); Central League MVP 1962; Hanshin Tigers #11 retired

Member of the Japanese

Baseball Hall of Fame
- Induction: 1993

Minoru Murayama (村山 実, Murayama Minoru; October 12, 1936 – August 22, 1998) was a professional baseball player for the Osaka Tigers (later Hanshin Tigers) in Nippon Professional Baseball. His number 11 is retired with the Tigers. A pitcher with Hanshin from 1959 to 1972, he recorded a career 2.09 ERA and 192 career complete games to go with 222 wins. He was inducted into the Japanese Hall of Fame in 1993.

== Early life ==
He was born on October 12, 1936, in Kita-ku, Kobe, Hyōgo Prefecture, Japan, and raised in Amagasaki. He played baseball at Sumitomo Technological High School. He went to Kansai University School of Commerce in 1950. He won the championship on All Japan Universities baseball championship in his sophomore at Kansai University. became a member of the Osaka Hanshin Tigers in 1959.

== Career ==
As a rookie in 1959, Murayama pitched in 54 games, recording 19 complete games in 26 starts. He was 18–10 that season with a microscopic 1.19 ERA to lead the league and also win the first Eiji Sawamura Award of his career. It also ended Masaichi Kaneda's run of three consecutive Sawamura Awards won. Murayama would match Kaneda's total of three Sawamura Awards over the course of his career, winning it outright in 1965 and sharing the award in 1966 with Tsuneo Horiuchi, the first time in the award's history that it had co-winners. The Sawamura would not have co-winners again until 2003, when Hanshin's Kei Igawa and Kazumi Saitoh of Daiei shared the award.

During his career as a player, his team, the Osaka Hanshin Tigers won the Central League Championship two times, 1962 and 1964. Although he was a player for the team, he became manager for the Osaka Hanshin Tigers from 1970 to 1972. He retired after the 1972 season. His Number 11 was retired by the Osaka Hanshin Tigers. He had been a commentator for baseball for a long time. Again, he became manager for the Osaka Hanshin Tigers in 1988 and 1989. People have said that he was " Mr. Tigers" since his retirement.

He was inducted into the Japanese Baseball Hall of Fame in 1993, then just five years later, he died due to rectal cancer at the age of only 61.

== Individual records ==
Career

- Wins : 222
- Losses : 147
- Strikeouts : 2274
- ERA : 2.09

== Titles ==
- MVP : 1 time (1962)
- Most wins : 2 times (1965, 1966)
- Best ERA : 3 times (1959, 1962, 1970)
- Most strikeouts : 2 times (1965, 1966)
- Best winning percentage : 1 time (1970)
- Sawamura Award : 3 times (1959, 1965, 1966)
- Best Nine Award : 3 times (1962, 1965, 1966)

== Books ==
- The apart from Back Number 11, Kobunsha, 1973
