= Morimichi Takagi =

Japanese baseball player (1941–2020)

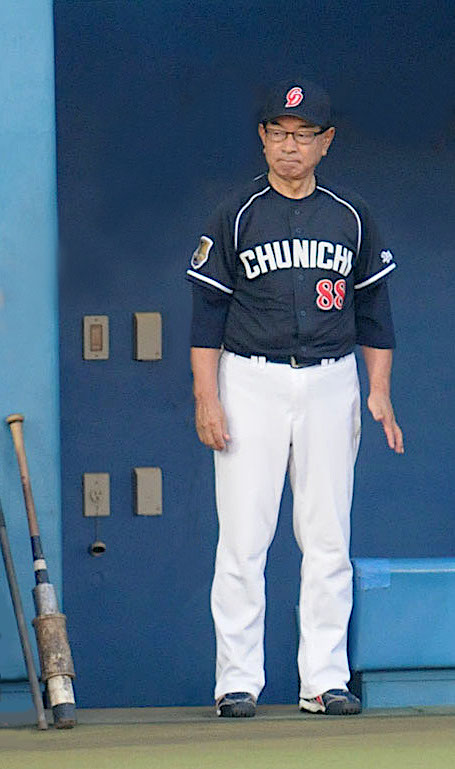
- Takagi in 2012
- Second baseman
- Born: July 17, 1941; Gifu, Gifu Prefecture, Japan
- Died: January 17, 2020 (aged 78); Gifu, Japan
- Batted: Right Threw: Right

NPB debut
- May 7, 1960, for the Chunichi Dragons

Last NPB appearance
- October 24, 1980, for the Chunichi Dragons

NPB statistics (through 1980)
- Batting average: .272
- Home runs: 236
- Hits: 2274
- Stolen Bases: 369
- Stats at Baseball Reference

Teams
- As player: Chunichi Dragons (1960–1980); As manager: Chunichi Dragons (1992–1995, 2012–2013); As coach: Chunichi Dragons (1978–1986)

Career highlights and awards
- 7× Central League Best Nine Award (1963–1967, 1974, 1977); 3× Central League Golden Glove Award (1974, 1977, 1979); 3× Central League stolen base champion (1963, 1965, 1973); 4× NPB All-Star (1966–1967, 1973, 1979)

Member of the Japanese

Baseball Hall of Fame
- Induction: 2006

Morimichi Takagi (高木 守道, Takagi Morimichi; July 17, 1941 – January 17, 2020) was a Japanese baseball player known for his long affiliation with the Chunichi Dragons. He played with the Dragons from 1960 to 1980, accumulating 2,274 hits and 236 home runs.

A speedy second baseman, he was a seven-time Central League Best Nine Award-winner (the most for his position in NPB history), a three-time Central League Golden Glove Award-winner and led the Central League in stolen bases three times. He was an NPB All-Star four separate times. He finished with 369 career stolen bases.

Takagi began as a player-coach for the Dragons in 1978, staying in that role through his retirement as a player in 1980. He stayed on as coach through 1986, returning to the team as manager from 1992 to 1995, and also from 2012 to 2013.

== See also ==
- List of Nippon Professional Baseball career hits leaders
