= List of Nippon Professional Baseball stadiums =

This is a list of baseball parks in top-level professional baseball in Japan. It was compiled primarily from the individual articles shown. It may be incomplete, and there also may be some inconsistencies due to occasional contradictory information between articles. Japanese baseball was organized originally as the Japanese Baseball League (JBL), starting with the 1936 season. For the 1950 season, the organization was renamed Nippon Professional Baseball and with additional clubs joining, it was broken into the Central League (CL) and the Pacific League (PL).

Various clubs have transferred from one city to another over time. Most of the clubs had also had several name changes, often independent of location, as a club's corporate owner is typically part of the club's name. For that reason, the first list is driven by team name. The second list is grouped by stadium name. The team list is confined to top-level professional clubs. The stadium list also includes some university-level clubs, where known.

== Key ==
^{‡}Denotes stadium with a retractable roof.
^{†}Denotes stadium with a fixed roof.

== Current stadiums ==
Name	Field image	Year opened	Seating capacity	Location	Home team	Playing surface	Distance to center field
Belluna Dome^{†}		1979	33,556	Tokorozawa, Saitama Prefecture	Saitama Seibu Lions	artificial turf	122 m (400 ft)
Es Con Field Hokkaido^{‡}		2023	36,000	Kitahiroshima, Hokkaido	Hokkaido Nippon-Ham Fighters	grass	121 m (397 ft)
Hanshin Koshien Stadium		1924	47,359	Nishinomiya, Hyōgo Prefecture	Hanshin Tigers	grass	118 m (387 ft)
Kobe Sports Park Baseball Stadium		1988	35,000	Kobe, Hyōgo Prefecture	Orix Buffaloes	grass	122 m (400 ft)
Kyocera Dome Osaka^{†}		1997	36,220	Osaka, Osaka Prefecture	Orix Buffaloes	artificial turf	122 m (400 ft)
Mazda Zoom-Zoom Stadium Hiroshima		2009	33,000	Hiroshima, Hiroshima Prefecture	Hiroshima Toyo Carp	grass	122 m (400 ft)
Meiji Jingu Stadium		1926	30,969	Shinjuku, Tokyo	Tokyo Yakult Swallows	artificial turf	120 m (394 ft)
Mizuho PayPay Dome Fukuoka^{‡}		1993	40,122	Fukuoka, Fukuoka Prefecture	Fukuoka SoftBank Hawks	artificial turf	122 m (400 ft)
Rakuten Mobile Park Miyagi		1950	31,220	Sendai, Miyagi Prefecture	Tohoku Rakuten Golden Eagles	grass	122 m (400 ft)
Tokyo Dome^{†}		1988	46,000	Bunkyō, Tokyo	Yomiuri Giants	artificial turf	122 m (400 ft)
Vantelin Dome Nagoya^{†}		1997	36,778	Nagoya, Aichi Prefecture	Chunichi Dragons	artificial turf	122 m (400 ft)
Yokohama Stadium		1978	35,250	Yokohama, Kanagawa Prefecture	Yokohama DeNA BayStars	artificial turf	118 m (387 ft)
Zozo Marine Stadium		1990	29,635	Chiba, Chiba Prefecture	Chiba Lotte Marines	artificial turf	122 m (400 ft)

== Former stadiums ==
Name	Year opened	Year closed	Location
Nippon Life Stadium	1950	1997	Osaka, Osaka Prefecture
Shimonoseki Municipal Stadium	1949	1985	Shimonoseki, Yamaguchi Prefecture
Kinugasa Stadium	1948		Kyoto, Kyoto Prefecture
Korakuen Stadium	1937	1987	Bunkyō, Tokyo
Osaka Stadium	1950	1998	Osaka, Osaka Prefecture
Kawasaki Stadium	1951		Kawasaki, Kanagawa Prefecture
Nagoya Stadium	1948		Nagoya, Aichi Prefecture
Hiroshima Sogo Ground Baseball Park	1941		Hiroshima, Hiroshima Prefecture
Hiroshima Municipal Stadium	1957	2010	Hiroshima, Hiroshima Prefecture
Tokyo Stadium	1962	1972	Arakawa, Tokyo
Heiwadai Stadium	1949	1997	Fukuoka, Fukuoka Prefecture
Hankyu Nishinomiya Stadium	1937	2002	Nishinomiya, Hyōgo Prefecture
Fujiidera Stadium	1928	2005	Fujiidera, Osaka Prefecture
Sapporo Dome	2001		Sapporo, Hokkaido

== Clubs listed alphabetically by current names, within league ==
=== Central League ===
Chunichi Dragons
Nagoya Baseball Club (1936–1943) JBL
Sangyo Baseball Club (1944)
Chubu Nippon (1946)
Chubu Nippon Dragons (1947)
Chunichi Dragons (1947 or 1948–1949) → To the CL
Chunichi Dragons (1950)
Nagoya Dragons (1951–1953)
Chunichi Dragons (1954–present)

??? (1936–47)
Korakuen Stadium (1948)
Chunichi Stadium → Nagoya Stadium (1949–1996)
Nagoya Dome (1997–present)

Hanshin Tigers
Osaka Tigers (1936–September 24, 1940, Nicknamed "Tigers") JBL
Hanshin Baseball Club (September 25, 1940–1944, maybe 1946)
Osaka Tigers (1946 or 1947–1949, Nicknamed "Hanshin") → To the CL
Osaka Tigers (1950–1960)
Hanshin Tigers (1961–present)

Koshien Stadium (1936–present)
also Kyocera Dome Osaka and Kobe Sports Park Baseball Stadium for some games

Hiroshima Toyo Carp
Hiroshima Carp (1950–1967)
Hiroshima Toyo Carp (1968–present)

Hiroshima Sogo Ground Baseball Park (1950-July 1957)
Hiroshima Municipal Stadium (1957) (July 1957–2008)
Mazda Stadium (2009–present)

Tokyo Yakult Swallows
Kokutetsu Swallows (1950–1965)
Sankei Swallows (1965)
Sankei Atoms (1966–1968)
Atoms (1969)
Yakult Atoms (1970–1973)
Yakult Swallows (1974–2005)
Tokyo Yakult Swallows (2006–present)

Korakuen Stadium (1950–1963)
Meiji Jingu Stadium (1964–present)

Yokohama DeNA BayStars
Dai Tokyo (1936) JBL
Lion Baseball Club (1937–1940)
Asahi Baseball Club (1941–1944)
Pacific Baseball Club (1946)
Taiyō Robins(1947–1949) → To the CL
Shochiku Robins (ca.1950-52) → merged with Taiyo Whales
Taiyo Whales (1950–1952)
Taiyō-Shochiku Robins (1953)
Yō-Shō Robins (1954)
Taiyō Whales (1955–1977)
Yokohama Taiyō Whales (1978–1992)
Yokohama BayStars (1993–2011)
Yokohama DeNA BayStars (2012–present)

Shimonoseki Baseball Stadium (1950–1952)
Osaka Stadium (1953–1954)
Kawasaki Stadium (1955–1977)
Yokohama Stadium (1978–present)

Yomiuri Giants
Dai-Nippon Tōkyō Yakyū Club (1934–1935) → To the JBL
Tokyo Kyojingun (1936–1944; 1946)
Tokyo Yomiuri Giants (1947–1949) → To the CL
Tokyo Yomiuri Giants (1950–2002)
Yomiuri Giants (2003–present)

Korakuen Stadium (1937–1987)
Tokyo Dome (1988–present)

=== Pacific League ===
Chiba Lotte Marines
Gold Star (1946) JBL
Kinsei Stars (1947–1948)
Daiei Stars (1949) → To the CL
Daiei Stars (1950–1955) → merged with Takahashi Unions in 1956 to form Daiei Unions → merged with Mainichi Orions in 1957 to form Daimai Orions

Mainichi Orions (1950–1957)
Mainichi Daiei Orions (Daimai Orions, 1958–1963)
Tokyo Orions (1964–1968)
Lotte Orions (1969–1991)
Chiba Lotte Marines (1992–present)

Korakuen Stadium (1950–1962)
Tokyo Stadium (1962–1972)
Miyagi Baseball Stadium (1973–1977)
Kawasaki Stadium (1978–1991)
Chiba Marine Stadium (1992–present)

Fukuoka SoftBank Hawks
Nankai Baseball Club (1938f–May 31, 1944) JBL
Kinki Nippon (June 1, 1944–December 31, 1944)
Great Ring (1946–May 31, 1947)
Nankai Hawks (June 1, 1947–1949) → To the PL
Nankai Hawks (1950–1988)
Fukuoka Daiei Hawks (1989–2004)
Fukuoka SoftBank Hawks (2005–present)

Sakai Ohama Baseball Stadium (1939)
Nankai Nakamozu Baseball Ground (1939–1949)
Osaka Stadium (1950–1988)
Heiwadai Stadium (1988–1992)
Fukuoka Dome (1993–present)

Hokkaido Nippon-Ham Fighters
Senators Baseball Club (1946) JBL
Tokyu Flyers (1947)
Kyuei Flyers (1948)
Tokyu Flyers (1949) → To the PL
Tokyu Flyers (1950–1953)
Toei Flyers (1954–1972)
Nittaku Home Flyers (1973)
Nippon-Ham Fighters (1974–2003)
Hokkaido Nippon-Ham Fighters (2004–present)

Korakuen Stadium (1946–1953)
Komazawa Stadium (1954–1987)
Tokyo Dome (1988–2003)
Sapporo Dome (2004–2022)
Es Con Field Hokkaido (2023–present)

Orix Buffaloes
Hankyu Professional Baseball Club (1936–1944; 1946) JBL
Hankyu Bears (January–April 1947)
Hankyu Braves (April 1947–1949) → To the PL
Hankyu Braves (1950–1988)
Orix Braves (1989–1990)
Orix BlueWave (1991–2004) → merged with Kintetsu Buffaloes

??? (1936)
Hankyu Nishinomiya Stadium (1937–1990)
Kobe Sports Park Baseball Stadium (1991–2004)

Kintetsu Pearls (1950–1958)
Kintetsu Buffalo (1959–1961)
Kintetsu Buffaloes (1962–1998)
Osaka Kintetsu Buffaloes (1999–2004) → merged with Orix Blue Wave

Fujiidera Stadium (1950–1996)
Osaka Stadium (1950–1957)
Nippon Life Insurance Stadium (1958–1983)
Osaka Dome (1997–2004)

Orix Buffaloes (2005–present)

Osaka Dome aka Kyocera Dome Osaka (2005; 2007–present)
Kobe Sports Park Baseball Stadium aka Hotto Motto Field Kobe (2005–present)

Saitama Seibu Lions
Nishi Nippon Pirates (1950) → merged with Nishitetsu Clippers

Nishitetsu Clippers (1950)
Nishitetsu Lions (1951–1972)
Taiheiyo Club Lions (1973–1976)
Crown Lighter Lions (1977–1978)
Seibu Lions (1979–2007)
Saitama Seibu Lions (2008–present)

Heiwadai Stadium (1950–1978)
Seibu Lions Stadium → Seibu Dome (1979–present)

Tohoku Rakuten Golden Eagles
Tohoku Rakuten Golden Eagles (2005–present)

Miyagi Baseball Stadium (2005–present)

=== Extinct clubs ===
This is a partial list of clubs that were in the JBL and which disbanded or merged. Taken verbatim from the JBL article:

- Korakuen Eagles (1937s) → Eagles Baseball Club (1938–1939) → Kurowashi Baseball Club (1940–1941) → Yamato Baseball Club (1942–1943) → Broken up
- Nagoya Kinko (1936–1940) → Merged into the Tsubasa Baseball Club
- Tokyo Senators (1936–1939) → Tsubasa Baseball Club (1940) → Taiyō Baseball Club (1941–1942) → Nishitetsu Baseball Club (1943) → Broken up

== Stadiums listed alphabetically by current names ==
Chiba Marine Stadium in Chiba
Occupant: Marines prev. Orions – PL (1992–present)

Fujiidera Stadium in Fujiidera, Osaka opened 1928 closed 2005
Occupant: Buffaloes – PL (1950–1996)

Fukuoka Dome in Fukuoka
Occupant: Hawks – PL (1993–present)

Hankyu Nishinomiya Stadium in Nishinomiya opened 1937 closed 2002
Occupant: Bears/Braves – JBL (1937–1949), PL (1950–1990)

Heiwadai Stadium in Fukuoka opened 1949 closed 1993
Occupants:

Lions – PL (1950–1978)
Hawks – PL (1988–1992)

Hiroshima Municipal Stadium (1957) in Naka-ku, Hiroshima opened 1957 closed 2009
Occupant: Carp – CL (1957–2008)

Mazda Stadium (Hiroshima Municipal Stadium) in Minami-ku, Hiroshima opened 2009
Occupant: Carp – CL (2009–present)

Hiroshima Sogo Ground Baseball Park in Hiroshima
Occupant: Carp – CL (1950–1957)

Kawasaki Stadium in Kawasaki, Kanagawa opened 1952 downsized 2004
Occupants:

Whales – CL (1955–1977)
Orions – PL (1978–1991)

Kobe Sports Park Baseball Stadium in Kobe opened 1950
Occupants:

Orix BlueWave – PL (1991–2004)
Orix Buffaloes – PL (2005–present) (some games)
Tigers – CL (some games)

Komazawa Stadium in Tokyo
Occupant: Flyers/Fighters – PL (1954–87)

Korakuen Stadium in Bunkyo, Tokyo
Occupants:

Tokyo Senators and successors – JBL (1937–1943)
Senators/Flyers – JBL (1946–49), PL (1950–53)
Dragons – JBL (1948 only)
Giants – JBL/CL (1949?-1987)
Swallows – CL (1950–1963)
Orions – PL (1950–1962)

Koshien Stadium in Nishinomiya, Hyōgo
Occupants:

Japanese High School Baseball Championship (1924–1940, 1947–present)
Japanese High School Baseball Invitational Tournament (1925–present)
Tigers – JBL (1936–1949), CL (1950–present)

Meiji Jingu Stadium in Shinjuku, Tokyo
Occupants:

Tokyo Big6 Baseball League – all games (1926–present)
Tohto University Baseball League – all Division I games (1930–present)
Tokyo Yakult Swallows and predecessors – CL (1964–present)

Miyagi Baseball Stadium in Sendai opened 1950
Occupants:

Orions – PL (1973–1977)
Golden Eagles – PL (2005–present)

Nagoya Stadium in Nagoya
Occupant: Dragons – CL (1949–1996)

Nagoya Dome in Nagoya opened 1997
Occupant: Dragons – CL (1997–present)

Osaka Dome in Osaka opened 1997
Occupants:

Kintetsu Buffaloes – PL (1997–2004)
Orix Buffaloes – PL (2005, 2007–present) (some games)
Tigers – CL (some games)

Osaka Stadium in Naniwa-ku, Osaka opened 1950 closed 1998
Occupants:

Hawks – PL (1950–1988)
Pearls – PL (1950–1957)
Whales – CL (1953–1954)

Sapporo Dome in Toyohira-ku, Sapporo opened 2001
Occupant: Fighters (2004–present)

Seibu Dome in Tokorozawa, Saitama
Occupant: Lions – PL (1979–present)

Shimonoseki Baseball Stadium in Taiyo (1950–1952)
Occupant: Whales – CL (1950–1952)

Tokyo Stadium
Occupant: Orions – PL (1962–1972)

Tokyo Dome in Bunkyo, Tokyo
Occupants:

Giants – CL (1988–present)
Fighters – PL (1988–2003)

Yokohama Stadium in Naka-ku, Yokohama opened 1978
Occupant: BayStars / prev. Whales – CL (1978–present)

== See also ==
- Lists of baseball parks
- Lists of stadiums
