= Baseball at the 1994 Asian Games =

- Venue: Municipal Stadium; Sogo Ground Baseball Park
- Dates: 9–14 October 1994
- Nations: 6

Baseball was contested by six teams at the 1994 Asian Games in Hiroshima, Japan from October 9 to October 14.

== Schedule ==
P	Preliminary round	½	Semifinals	F	Finals

Event↓/Date →	9th Sun	10th Mon	11th Tue	12th Wed	13th Thu	14th Fri
Men	P	P	P		½	F

== Medalists ==
Event	Gold	Silver	Bronze
Men	Japan; Masaaki Daito; Masao Fujii; Norimasa Fujimine; Toshio Fukudome; Naoki Matsumoto; Nobuhiko Matsunaka; Masahiko Mori; Daishin Nakamura; Toshihisa Nishi; Hideaki Okubo; Hitoshi Ono; Minoru Saeki; Tomoaki Sato; Kazuki Sawada; Masanori Sugiura; Takayuki Takabayashi; Taisei Takagi; Jiro Toyoda; So Tsutsui; Masahiro Yamada	South Korea; An Hee-bong; Baek Jae-ho; Cha Myeong-ju; Cho Kyung-hwan; Cho Sung-min; Choi Ki-moon; Hong Won-ki; Jeon Byeong-ho; Jin Kab-yong; Kang Hyuk; Kim Jae-gul; Kim Jong-kook; Kwon O-yeong; Lee Byung-kyu; Lee Young-woo; Lim Sun-dong; Moon Dong-hwan; Park Jae-hong; Son Min-han; Wi Jae-yeong	Chinese Taipei; Chen Chun-hung; Chen Kai-fa; Ho Chih-fan; Hsieh Fu-guey; Hsu Sheng-chieh; Huang Ching-ching; Huang Hsin-fu; Huang Kan-lin; Huang Kuei-yu; Hung Chi-feng; Kao Chien-san; Liang Ju-hao; Lin Hung-yuan; Lin Sheng-hsiung; Lin Yueh-liang; Liu Chih-sheng; Wu Chun-liang; Wu Wen-yu; Yang Fu-chun; Yeh Chun-chang

== Results ==
All times are Japan Standard Time (UTC+09:00)

=== Preliminary round ===
==== Group A ====
Pos	Team	Pld	W	L	RF	RA	PCT	GB	Qualification
1	Japan	2	2	0	35	3	1.000	—	Semifinals
2	China	2	1	1	17	11	.500	1	Semifinals
3	Thailand	2	0	2	3	41	.000	2	5th place game

Source: Official website

9 October; 13:00	Japan	25–2 (F/5)	Thailand	Municipal Stadium, Hiroshima

Team	1	2	3	4	5	6	7	8	9	R
Thailand	2	0	0	0	0	—	—	—	—	2
Japan	13	2	1	9	X	—	—	—	—	25

10 October; 13:00	China	1–10	Japan	Municipal Stadium, Hiroshima

Team	1	2	3	4	5	6	7	8	9	R
Japan	0	0	2	3	0	0	1	0	4	10
China	0	1	0	0	0	0	0	0	0	1

11 October; 13:00	Thailand	1–16 (F/6)	China	Municipal Stadium, Hiroshima

Team	1	2	3	4	5	6	7	8	9	R
China	4	4	3	1	2	2	—	—	—	16
Thailand	0	0	0	1	0	0	—	—	—	1

==== Group B ====
Pos	Team	Pld	W	L	RF	RA	PCT	GB	Qualification
1	South Korea	2	2	0	30	0	1.000	—	Semifinals
2	Chinese Taipei	2	1	1	20	9	.500	1	Semifinals
3	Mongolia	2	0	2	0	41	.000	2	5th place game

Source: Official website

9 October; 13:00	South Korea	21–0 (F/5)	Mongolia	Sogo Ground Baseball Park, Hiroshima

Team	1	2	3	4	5	6	7	8	9	R
Mongolia	0	0	0	0	0	—	—	—	—	0
South Korea	15	4	0	2	X	—	—	—	—	21

10 October; 13:00	Chinese Taipei	0–9	South Korea	Sogo Ground Baseball Park, Hiroshima

Team	1	2	3	4	5	6	7	8	9	R
South Korea	0	0	4	2	0	2	0	0	1	9
Chinese Taipei	0	0	0	0	0	0	0	0	0	0

11 October; 13:00	Mongolia	0–20 (F/5)	Chinese Taipei	Sogo Ground Baseball Park, Hiroshima

Team	1	2	3	4	5	6	7	8	9	R
Chinese Taipei	8	7	0	4	1	—	—	—	—	20
Mongolia	0	0	0	0	0	—	—	—	—	0

=== 5th place game ===
13 October; 10:00	Thailand	20–3 (F/5)	Mongolia	Municipal Stadium, Hiroshima

=== Final round ===
Semifinals
13 October
South Korea (F/7)	14
China	0
13 October
Japan (F/7)	13
Chinese Taipei	3

Final
14 October
South Korea	5
Japan	6
Bronze medal game
14 October
China	4
Chinese Taipei	9

==== Semifinals ====
13 October; 12:00	South Korea	14–0 (F/7)	China	Municipal Stadium, Hiroshima

Team	1	2	3	4	5	6	7	8	9	R
China	0	0	0	0	0	0	0	—	—	0
South Korea	2	3	1	2	1	5	X	—	—	14

13 October; 14:00	Japan	13–3 (F/7)	Chinese Taipei	Municipal Stadium, Hiroshima

Team	1	2	3	4	5	6	7	8	9	R
Chinese Taipei	1	0	0	1	0	0	1	—	—	3
Japan	3	7	1	2	0	0	X	—	—	13

==== Bronze medal game ====
14 October; 10:00	China	4–9	Chinese Taipei	Municipal Stadium, Hiroshima

Team	1	2	3	4	5	6	7	8	9	R
Chinese Taipei	2	1	0	0	2	0	0	4	0	9
China	0	0	1	0	1	0	2	0	0	4

==== Final ====
14 October; 12:00	South Korea	5–6	Japan	Municipal Stadium, Hiroshima

Team	1	2	3	4	5	6	7	8	9	R
Japan	0	0	0	2	0	0	2	0	2	6
South Korea	0	0	0	0	3	0	0	0	2	5

== Final standing ==
Rank	Team	Pld	W	L
1st place, gold medalist(s)	Japan	4	4	0
2nd place, silver medalist(s)	South Korea	4	3	1
3rd place, bronze medalist(s)	Chinese Taipei	4	2	2
4	China	4	1	3
5	Thailand	3	1	2
6	Mongolia	3	0	3
