= 1984 Japan Series =

35th edition of Nippon Professional Baseball's postseason championship series

Team (Wins)	Managers	Season
Hiroshima Toyo Carp (4)	Takeshi Koba	75–45–10 (.625), GA: 3
Hankyu Braves (3)	Toshiharu Ueda	75–45–10 (.625), GA: 8½
- Dates: October 13–22
- MVP: Kiyoyuki Nagashima (Hiroshima)
- FSA: Yukihiko Yamaoki (Hankyu)

The 1984 Japan Series was the championship series of Nippon Professional Baseball (NPB) for the 1984 season. The 35th edition of the Series, it was a best-of-seven playoff that matched the Central League champion Hiroshima Toyo Carp against the Pacific League champion Hankyu Braves. This was the fourth Japan Series appearance for the Carp, and the tenth appearance for the Braves. The Carp defeated the Braves in seven games to claim their third Japan Series championship.

As of 2024, this remains the last time that the Toyo Carp won the Japan Series, as the Carp are now the only remaining team in Nippon Professional Baseball to have won their most recent championship in the 20th century.

== Summary ==
CL Hiroshima Toyo Carp (4) vs. PL Hankyu Braves (3)

Game	Date	Score	Location	Time	Attendance
1	October 13	Hankyu Braves – 2, Hiroshima Toyo Carp – 3	Hiroshima Municipal Stadium	2:40	28,863
2	October 14	Hankyu Braves – 5, Hiroshima Toyo Carp – 2	Hiroshima Municipal Stadium	3:15	31,289
3	October 16	Hiroshima Toyo Carp – 8, Hankyu Braves – 3	Hankyu Nishinomiya Stadium	3:17	19,022
4	October 18	Hiroshima Toyo Carp – 3, Hankyu Braves – 2	Hankyu Nishinomiya Stadium	3:21	22,162
5	October 19	Hiroshima Toyo Carp – 2, Hankyu Braves – 6	Hankyu Nishinomiya Stadium	3:41	14,442
6	October 21	Hankyu Braves – 8, Hiroshima Toyo Carp – 3	Hiroshima Municipal Stadium	3:43	30,442
7	October 22	Hankyu Braves – 2, Hiroshima Toyo Carp – 7	Hiroshima Municipal Stadium	3:10	25,720

== Matchups ==
=== Game 1 ===
Saturday, October 13, 1984 1:00 pm (JST) at Hiroshima Municipal Stadium in Hiroshima
Team	1	2	3	4	5	6	7	8	9	R	H	E
Hankyu	0	0	1	1	0	0	0	0	0	2	7	1
Hiroshima	0	0	1	0	0	0	0	2	X	3	6	1
WP: Seiji Kobayashi (1–0) LP: Hisashi Yamada (0–1); Home runs: HAN: Mineo Fukuhara (1); HIR: Kiyoyuki Nagashima (1)

Hisashi Yamada was matched for Hankyu against Kazuo Yamane for Hiroshima. Mineo Fukuhara gave the Braves the lead on his solo shot in the third inning, but Hiroshi Yamamoto tied the game for Hiroshima in the bottom frame on his two-out hit. Susumu Kobayashi gave the Braves the lead when he attempted to steal base and the throw from the catcher went into the outfield that saw him run home. In the 8th inning, Hiroshima rallied with a two-run home run by Kiyoyuki Nagashima. Seiji Kobayashi, inserted in the 8th inning for the Carp, kept the Braves scoreless to get the win.

=== Game 2 ===
Sunday, October 14, 1984 1:00 pm (JST) at Hiroshima Municipal Stadium in Hiroshima
Team	1	2	3	4	5	6	7	8	9	R	H	E
Hankyu	0	0	0	0	0	0	0	0	5	5	10	0
Hiroshima	1	0	1	0	0	0	0	0	0	2	7	2
WP: Yukihiko Yamaoki (1–0) LP: Manabu Kitabeppu (0–1); Home runs: HAN: Koji Minoda (1); HIR: None

Manabu Kitabeppu was matched against Yutaro Imai in a game that turned on its head in the 9th inning. The Carp had an early 2-0 lead with hits by Kiyoyuki Nagashima and Hiroshi Yamamoto while the Braves were held scoreless for eight innings. In the 9th, Kitabeppu could only get one out, with Koji Minoda starting a rally for the Braves. Shinichi Murakami then tied the game on a pinch-hit base hit. Seiji Kobayashi was then tasked to try and get two outs but gave up two hits that saw the Braves even the series.

=== Game 3 ===
Tuesday, October 16, 1984 1:00 pm (JST) at Hankyu Nishinomiya Stadium in Nishinomiya, Hyōgo Prefecture
Team	1	2	3	4	5	6	7	8	9	R	H	E
Hiroshima	0	1	4	2	0	0	1	0	0	8	12	0
Hankyu	0	0	2	0	0	1	0	0	0	3	8	0
WP: Kazuhisa Kawaguchi (1–0) LP: Yoshinori Sato (0–1); Home runs: HIR: None; HAN: Koji Yamamoto (1), Kiyoyuki Nagashima (2), Yoshihiko Takahashi (1), Sachio Kinugasa (1)

Kazuhisa Kawaguchi was matched against Yoshinori Sato for Hankyu. Koji Yamamoto gave the Carp the lead with his solo shot in the 2nd inning before the game was broken open on a grand slam by Kiyoyuki Nagashima in the third inning. Yutaka Fukumoto and Keijiro Yumioka narrowed the deficit in the bottom half of the frame with RBI hits but the Carp piled on while Kawaguchi hurled a 166-pitch complete game to give the Carp the series lead.

=== Game 4 ===
Thursday, October 18, 1984 1:00 pm (JST) at Hankyu Nishinomiya Stadium in Nishinomiya, Hyōgo Prefecture
Team	1	2	3	4	5	6	7	8	9	R	H	E
'Hiroshima	1	0	0	0	0	1	0	0	1	3	12	0
Hankyu	0	0	0	0	0	0	2	0	X	2	8	0
WP: Yutaka Ono (1–0) LP: Hisashi Yamada (0–1); Home runs: HIR: Sachio Kinugasa (2); HAN: Hiromi Matsunaga (1)

Game 4 was delayed a day due to rain. Yoshihiko Takahashi delivered a base hit for the Carp in the 9th before stealing second base to set himself in scoring position. Koji Yamamoto hit a double to give the Carp the go-ahead lead. Yutaka Ohno, inserted in the 8th inning, managed to close out the game for the Carp.

=== Game 5 ===
Friday, October 19, 1984 1:00 pm (JST) at Hankyu Nishinomiya Stadium in Nishinomiya, Hyōgo Prefecture
Team	1	2	3	4	5	6	7	8	9	R	H	E
Hiroshima	0	1	0	0	0	1	0	0	0	2	8	0
Hankyu	0	1	0	1	1	0	1	2	X	6	13	1
WP: Yutaro Imai (1–0) LP: Manabu Kitabeppu (0–2) Sv: Yukihiko Yamaoki (1); Home runs: HIR: Shinya Kobayashi (1); HAN: None

Shinya Kobayashi gave the Braves a lead they would not relinquish as the Braves narrowed the series deficit.

=== Game 6 ===
Sunday, October 21, 1984 1:00 pm (JST) at Hiroshima Municipal Stadium in Hiroshima
Team	1	2	3	4	5	6	7	8	9	R	H	E
Hankyu	0	0	7	0	0	1	0	0	0	8	10	0
Hiroshima	2	1	0	0	0	0	0	0	X	3	8	0
WP: Yukihiko Yamaoki (2–0) LP: Kazuhisa Kawaguchi (1–1); Home runs: HAN: Mineo Fukuhara (2); HIR: Mitsuo Tatsukawa (1)

Mineo Fukuhara delivered a grand slam in a seven-run third inning to turn a 3-0 deficit into an insurmountable lead for the Braves, who forced a Game 7.

=== Game 7 ===
Monday, October 22, 1984 1:00 pm (JST) at Hiroshima Municipal Stadium in Hiroshima
Team	1	2	3	4	5	6	7	8	9	R	H	E
Hankyu	1	0	0	0	0	1	0	0	0	2	0	1
Hiroshima	0	0	1	0	0	1	3	2	X	7	0	0
WP: Kazuo Yamane (1–0) LP: Hisashi Yamada (0–3); Home runs: HAN: Keijiro Yumioka (1); HIR: Sachio Kinugasa (3), Kiyoyuki Nagashima (3)

Kazuo Yamane of Hiroshima was matched against Hisashi Yamada for Hankyu. Keijiro Yumioka gave the Braves an early lead two batters in the game with a home run. Yoshio Kinugasa tied the game with his home run in the third inning. Both teams scored in the sixth inning. With two runners on base in the 7th, Takazo Yamazaki delivered a two-run double to open the floodgates for the Carp. Yamane threw a 153-pitch complete game for Hiroshima that saw him give up 10 hits and two runs with six strikeouts as the Carp won the championship. Kiyoyuki Nagashima was named MVP for his efforts in the series, having batted .333 with three home runs and 10 RBIs.

== See also ==
- 1984 World Series
