= 1979 Japan Series =

Nippon Professional Baseball postseason championship series

Team (Wins)	Managers	Season
Hiroshima Carp (4)	Takeshi Koba	67–50–13 (.573), 6 GA
Kintetsu Buffaloes (3)	Yukio Nishimoto	74–45–11 (.622)
- Dates: October 24 – November 4
- MVP: Yoshihiko Takahashi (Hiroshima)
- FSA: Takashi Imoto (Kintetsu)

The 1979 Japan Series was the championship series of Nippon Professional Baseball (NPB) for the 1979 season. The 30th edition of the Series, it was a best-of-seven playoff that matched the Central League champion Hiroshima Carp against the Pacific League champion Kintetsu Buffaloes.

For the Series, the Buffaloes hosted its four games at Osaka Stadium due to issues with both Nippon Life Stadium (lack of capacity over 30,000) and Fujiidera Stadium (no night game facilities). The home team won each of the first six games. Game 7 went down to the wire, with Hiroshima hanging on to a one-run lead. The 9th inning saw reliever Yutaka Enatsu throw 21 pitches in one of the most famous 9th inning duels in NPB history, which saw the Buffaloes get the bases loaded with no outs before Enatsu got out of the jam, with the final out being a strikeout of Shigeru Ishiwatari.

== Summary ==
Game	Score	Date	Location	Attendance
1	Buffaloes – 5, Carp – 2	October 27	Osaka Stadium	25,121
2	Buffaloes – 4, Carp – 0	October 31	Osaka Stadium	27,848
3	Carp – 3, Buffaloes – 2	October 28	Hiroshima Stadium	29,032
4	Carp – 5, Buffaloes – 3	October 30	Hiroshima Stadium	29,057
5	Carp – 1, Buffaloes – 0	October 31	Hiroshima Stadium	29,090
6	Buffaloes – 6, Carp – 2	November 3	Osaka Stadium	27,813
7	Buffaloes – 3, Carp – 4	November 4	Osaka Stadium	24,376

== See also ==
- 1979 Pacific League Playoffs
- 1979 World Series
