= 1980 Nippon Professional Baseball season =

1980 NPB season
- League: Nippon Professional Baseball
- Sport: Baseball

Regular season
- Season MVP: CL: Koji Yamamoto (HIR); PL: Isamu Kida (NIP)

League postseason
- CL champions: Hiroshima Toyo Carp
- CL runners-up: Yakult Swallows
- PL champions: Kintetsu Buffaloes
- PL runners-up: Lotte Orions

Japan Series
- Champions: Hiroshima Toyo Carp
- Runners-up: Kintetsu Buffaloes
- Finals MVP: Jim Lyttle (HIR)

NPB seasons
- ← 1979 1981 →

The 1980 Nippon Professional Baseball season was the 31st season of operation for the league.

== Regular season standings ==
=== Central League ===
Central League	G	W	L	T	Pct.	GB
Hiroshima Toyo Carp	130	73	44	13	.624	–
Yakult Swallows	130	68	52	10	.567	6.5
Yomiuri Giants	130	61	60	9	.504	14.0
Yokohama Taiyo Whales	130	59	62	9	.488	16.0
Hanshin Tigers	130	54	66	10	.450	20.5
Chunichi Dragons	130	45	76	9	.372	30.0

=== Pacific League ===
Pacific League	G	W	L	T	Pct.	1st half ranking	2nd half ranking
Kintetsu Buffaloes	130	68	54	8	.557	2	1
Lotte Orions	130	64	51	15	.557	1	3
Nippon-Ham Fighters	130	66	53	11	.555	2	2
Seibu Lions	130	62	64	4	.492	6	4
Hankyu Braves	130	58	67	5	.464	4	5
Nankai Hawks	130	48	77	5	.384	5	6

== Pacific League playoff ==
The Pacific League teams with the best first and second-half records met in a best-of-five playoff series to determine the league representative in the Japan Series.

Kintetsu Buffaloes won the series 3–0.

Game	Score	Date	Location
1	Orions – 1, Buffaloes – 4	October 15	Kawasaki Stadium
2	Orions – 2, Buffaloes – 4	October 16	Kawasaki Stadium
3	Buffaloes – 13, Orions – 4	October 18	Osaka Stadium

== Japan Series ==
Hiroshima Toyo Carp won the series 4–3.

Game	Score	Date	Location	Attendance
1	Carp – 4, Buffaloes – 6	October 25	Hiroshima Municipal Stadium	29,037
2	Carp – 2, Buffaloes – 9	October 26	Hiroshima Municipal Stadium	29,668
3	Buffaloes – 3, Carp – 4	October 28	Osaka Stadium	17,371
4	Buffaloes – 0, Carp – 2	October 29	Osaka Stadium	21,254
5	Buffaloes – 6, Carp – 2	October 30	Osaka Stadium	22,287
6	Carp – 6, Buffaloes – 2	November 1	Hiroshima Municipal Stadium	29,297
7	Carp – 8, Buffaloes – 3	November 2	Hiroshima Municipal Stadium	29,952

== See also ==
- 1980 Major League Baseball season
