= 1979 Nippon Professional Baseball season =

1979 NPB season
- League: Nippon Professional Baseball
- Sport: Baseball

Regular season
- Season MVP: CL: Yutaka Enatsu (HIR); PL: Charlie Manuel (KIN)

League postseason
- CL champions: Hiroshima Toyo Carp
- CL runners-up: Yokohama Taiyo Whales
- PL champions: Kintetsu Buffaloes
- PL runners-up: Hankyu Braves

Japan Series
- Champions: Hiroshima Toyo Carp
- Runners-up: Kintetsu Buffaloes
- Finals MVP: Yoshihiko Takahashi (HIR)

NPB seasons
- ← 1978 1980 →

The 1979 Nippon Professional Baseball season was the 30th season of operation for the league.

== Regular season standings ==
=== Central League ===
| Central League | G | W | L | T | Pct. | GB |
|---|---|---|---|---|---|---|
| Hiroshima Toyo Carp | 130 | 67 | 50 | 13 | .573 | -- |
| Yokohama Taiyo Whales | 130 | 59 | 54 | 17 | .522 | 6.0 |
| Chunichi Dragons | 130 | 59 | 57 | 14 | .509 | 7.5 |
| Hanshin Tigers | 130 | 61 | 60 | 9 | .504 | 8.0 |
| Yomiuri Giants | 130 | 58 | 62 | 10 | .483 | 10.5 |
| Yakult Swallows | 130 | 48 | 69 | 13 | .410 | 19.0 |

=== Pacific League ===
| Pacific League | G | W | L | T | Pct. | 1st half ranking | 2nd half ranking |
|---|---|---|---|---|---|---|---|
| Kintetsu Buffaloes | 130 | 74 | 45 | 11 | .622 | 1 | 2 |
| Hankyu Braves | 130 | 75 | 44 | 11 | .630 | 2 | 1 |
| Nippon-Ham Fighters | 130 | 63 | 60 | 7 | .512 | 3 | 4 |
| Lotte Orions | 130 | 55 | 63 | 12 | .466 | 4 | 3 |
| Nankai Hawks | 130 | 46 | 73 | 11 | .387 | 5 | 6 |
| Seibu Lions | 130 | 45 | 73 | 12 | .381 | 6 | 5 |

== Pacific League playoff ==
The Pacific League teams with the best first and second-half records met in a best-of-five playoff series to determine the league representative in the Japan Series.

Kintetsu Buffaloes won the series 3-0.

| Game | Score | Date | Location |
|---|---|---|---|
| 1 | Buffaloes – 5, Braves – 1 | October 13 | Osaka Stadium |
| 2 | Buffaloes – 7, Braves – 4 | October 14 | Osaka Stadium |
| 3 | Braves – 1, Buffaloes – 2 | October 16 | Hankyu Nishinomiya Stadium |

Tuesday, October 16, 1979 2:00 pm (JST) at Hankyu Nishinomiya Stadium in Nishinomiya, Hyōgo
| Team | 1 | 2 | 3 | 4 | 5 | 6 | 7 | 8 | 9 | 10 | R | H | E |
|---|---|---|---|---|---|---|---|---|---|---|---|---|---|
| Kintetsu | 0 | 0 | 1 | 0 | 0 | 1 | 0 | 0 | 0 | 1 | 2 | 7 | 1 |
| Hankyu | 0 | 0 | 0 | 0 | 0 | 0 | 0 | 0 | 0 | 0 | 1 | 7 | 3 |
WP: Tetsuji Yamaguchi (1–0) LP: Mitsuo Inaba (0–1); Home runs: KIN: Yutaka Fukumoto (1); HAN: None

The Buffaloes prevailed in Game 3 for their first ever league pennant.

== Japan Series ==
Hiroshima Toyo Carp won the series 4-3.

| Game | Score | Date | Location | Attendance |
|---|---|---|---|---|
| 1 | Buffaloes – 5, Carp – 2 | October 27 | Osaka Stadium | 25,121 |
| 2 | Buffaloes – 4, Carp – 0 | October 31 | Osaka Stadium | 27,848 |
| 3 | Carp – 3, Buffaloes – 2 | October 28 | Hiroshima Stadium | 29,032 |
| 4 | Carp – 5, Buffaloes – 3 | October 30 | Hiroshima Stadium | 29,057 |
| 5 | Carp – 1, Buffaloes – 0 | October 31 | Hiroshima Stadium | 29,090 |
| 6 | Buffaloes – 6, Carp – 2 | November 3 | Osaka Stadium | 27,813 |
| 7 | Buffaloes – 3, Carp – 4 | November 4 | Osaka Stadium | 24,376 |

== See also ==
- 1979 Major League Baseball season
