= Nissei =

Nissei may refer to:

- Nisei, second-generation Japanese immigrants in the Americas
- Nippon Life or Nissay, Japanese life insurance company
- Nissei-chuo Station, railway station in Inagawa, Hyōgo, Japan
  - Nissei Line, route of Nose Electric Railway from Yamashita Station to Nissei-chuo Station
- Nissay Theatre, theatre in Chiyoda, Tokyo, Japan
- Nippon Life Stadium, former baseball stadium in Osaka, Japan
- Nissay Red Elf, professional women's table tennis team in the T.League

== See also ==
- Nisshin (disambiguation)
