= 1984 Nippon Professional Baseball season =

1984 NPB season
- League: Nippon Professional Baseball
- Sport: Baseball

Regular season
- Season MVP: CL: Sachio Kinugasa (HIR); PL: Greg Wells (HAN)

League postseason
- CL champions: Hiroshima Toyo Carp
- CL runners-up: Chunichi Dragons
- PL champions: Hankyu Braves
- PL runners-up: Lotte Orions

Japan Series
- Champions: Hiroshima Toyo Carp
- Runners-up: Hankyu Braves
- Finals MVP: Kiyoyuki Nagashima (HIR)

NPB seasons
- ← 1983 1985 →

The 1984 Nippon Professional Baseball season was the 35th season of operation for the league.

== Regular season standings ==
=== Central League ===
Central League	G	W	L	T	Pct.	GB
Hiroshima Toyo Carp	130	75	45	10	.625	–
Chunichi Dragons	130	73	49	8	.598	3.0
Yomiuri Giants	130	67	54	9	.554	8.5
Hanshin Tigers	130	53	69	8	.434	23.0
Yakult Swallows	130	51	71	8	.418	25.0
Yokohama Taiyo Whales	130	46	77	7	.374	30.5

=== Pacific League ===
Pacific League	G	W	L	T	Pct.	GB
Hankyu Braves	130	75	45	10	.625	–
Lotte Orions	130	64	51	15	.557	8.5
Seibu Lions	130	62	61	7	.504	14.5
Kintetsu Buffaloes	130	58	61	11	.487	16.5
Nankai Hawks	130	53	65	12	.449	21.0
Nippon-Ham Fighters	130	44	73	13	.376	29.5

== Japan Series ==
Hiroshima Toyo Carp won the series 4–3.

Game	Score	Date	Location	Attendance
1	Carp – 3, Braves – 2	October 13	Hiroshima Municipal Stadium	28,863
2	Carp – 2, Braves – 5	October 14	Hiroshima Municipal Stadium	31,289
3	Braves – 3, Carp – 8	October 16	Hankyu Nishinomiya Stadium	19,022
4	Braves – 2, Carp – 3	October 18	Hankyu Nishinomiya Stadium	22,162
5	Braves – 6, Carp – 2	October 19	Hankyu Nishinomiya Stadium	14,442
6	Carp – 3, Braves – 8	October 21	Hiroshima Municipal Stadium	30,442
7	Carp – 7, Braves – 2	October 22	Hiroshima Municipal Stadium	25,720

== See also ==
- 1984 Major League Baseball season
