= Asayama =

Asayama (written: 朝山) is a Japanese surname. Notable people with the surname include:

- Shogo Asayama (朝山 正悟, born 1981), Japanese basketball player and coach
- Toyo Asayama (朝山 東洋, born 1976), Japanese baseball player

== See also ==
- Asayama Ichiden-ryū, a Japanese martial art
