= Yoshihiko Takahashi =

Japanese baseball player and coach (born 1957)

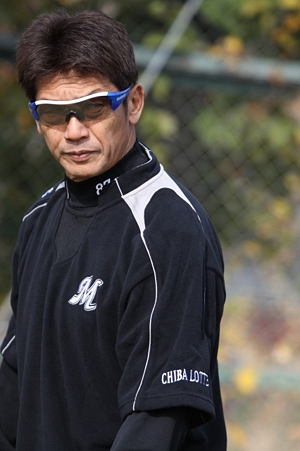
- Shortstop / Coach
- Born: March 13, 1957 (age 69); Ashibetsu, Hokkaido, Japan
- Batted: Switch Threw: Right

debut
- 1976, for the Hiroshima Toyo Carp

Last appearance
- 1992, for the Hanshin Tigers

Career statistics
- Batting average: .280
- Home runs: 163
- Runs batted in: 604
- Stolen bases: 477
- Stats at Baseball Reference

Teams
- As player: Hiroshima Toyo Carp (1976–1989); Lotte Orions (1990); Hanshin Tigers (1991–1992); As coach: Fukuoka Daiei Hawks (1995–1997); Chiba Lotte Marines (2004–2012); Orix Buffaloes (2016)

Career highlights and awards
- 3× Japan Series champion (1979, 1980, 1984); Japan Series MVP (1979); 5× Best Nine Award (1978–1980, 1983, 1986)

Yoshihiko Takahashi (高橋 慶彦, born March 13, 1957) is a Japanese former professional baseball shortstop in Nippon Professional Baseball (NPB). He played for the Hiroshima Toyo Carp from 1976 to 1989, Lotte Orions in 1990 and the Hanshin Tigers from 1991 to 1992. He was the Japan Series MVP in 1979. He holds the NPB record for consecutive games with a hit at 33, between June and July 1979.
