= Michio Aoyama =

Japanese baseball player (born 1959)

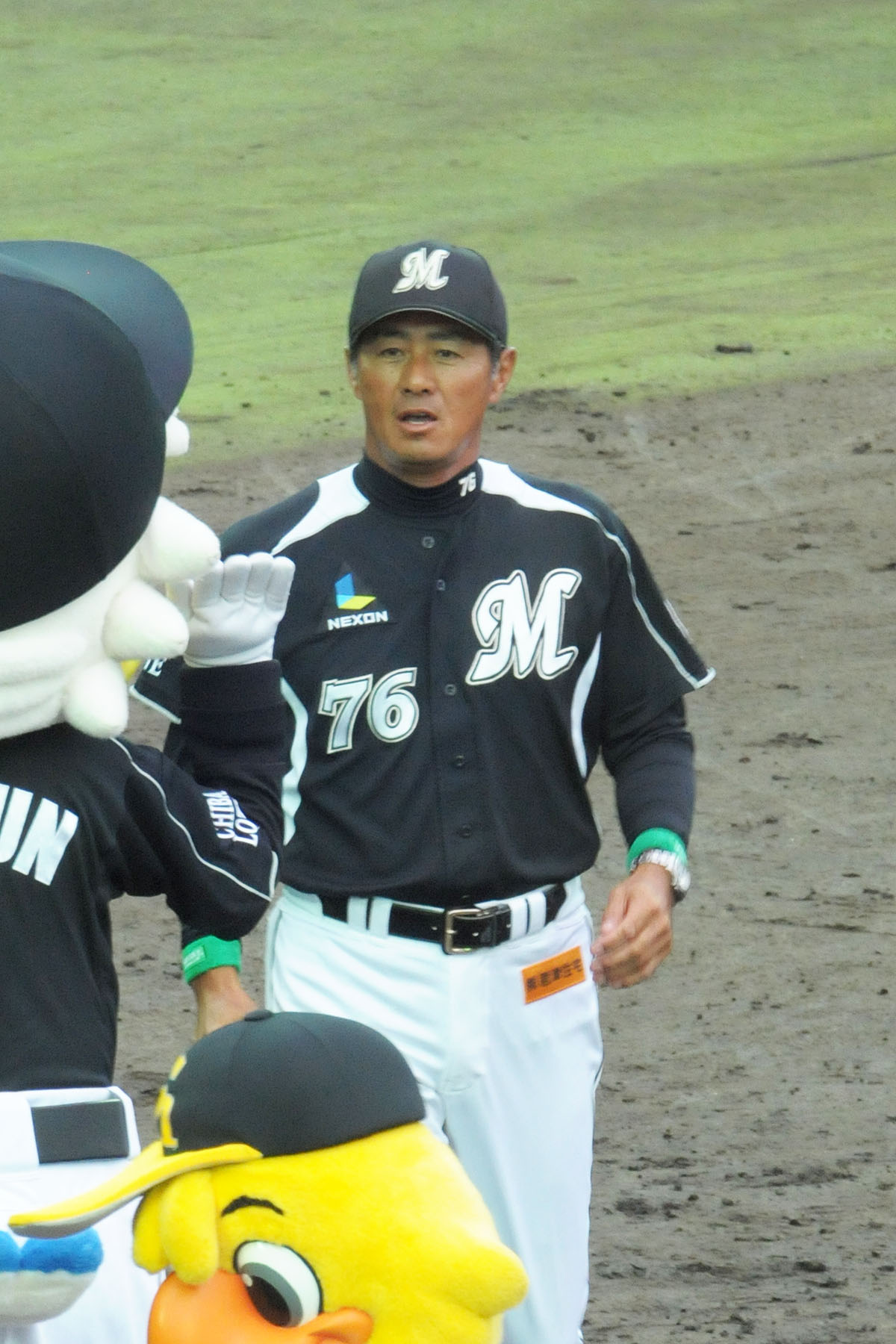
- Outfielder / Coach
- Born: December 17, 1959; Shizuoka, Shizuoka, Japan
- Batted: Right Threw: Right

NPB debut
- April 2, 1984, for the Seibu Lions

Last appearance
- October 4, 1992, for the Yokohama Taiyō Whales

NPB statistics (through 1992)
- Batting average: .154
- Hits: 19
- Home runs: 3
- Runs batted in: 15
- Stolen base: 3

Teams
- As player: Seibu Lions (1984–1989); Yokohama Taiyō Whales (1990–1992); As coach: Yokohama BayStars (1993–2008); Chiba Lotte Marines (2010–2015); Yokohama DeNA BayStars (2016–2024)

Michio Aoyama (青山 道雄, Aoyama Michio; born December 17, 1959 in Shizuoka, Shizuoka, Japan) is a Japanese former Nippon Professional Baseball outfielder.
