= Fukuchi =

Fukuchi may refer to:

- Fukuchi (surname), a Japanese surname
- Fukuchi, Fukuoka, a town in Tagawa District, Fukuoka Prefecture, Japan
- Fukuchi, Aomori, a former village in Sannohe District, Aomori Prefecture, Japan
- Fukuchi Station, a railway station in Nishio, Aichi Prefecture, Japan
