= 1980 Japan Series =

Team (Wins)	Managers	Season
Hiroshima Toyo Carp (4)	Takeshi Koba	73–44–13 (.624), 6½ GA
Kintetsu Buffaloes (3)	Yukio Nishimoto	68–54–8 (.557)
- Dates: October 25 – November 2
- MVP: Jim Lyttle (Hiroshima)
- FSA: Toru Ogawa (Kintetsu)

The 1980 Japan Series was the championship series of Nippon Professional Baseball (NPB) for the 1980 season. The 31st edition of the Series, it was a best-of-seven playoff that matched the Central League champion Hiroshima Toyo Carp against the Pacific League champion Kintetsu Buffaloes. In a rematch from the previous year's Japan Series, the Carp defeated the Buffaloes in seven games to capture their second consecutive Japan Series championship.

== Summary ==
Game	Score	Date	Location	Attendance
1	Carp – 4, Buffaloes – 6	October 25	Hiroshima Municipal Stadium	29,037
2	Carp – 2, Buffaloes – 9	October 26	Hiroshima Municipal Stadium	29,668
3	Buffaloes – 3, Carp – 4	October 28	Osaka Stadium	17,371
4	Buffaloes – 0, Carp – 2	October 29	Osaka Stadium	21,254
5	Buffaloes – 6, Carp – 2	October 30	Osaka Stadium	22,287
6	Carp – 6, Buffaloes – 2	November 1	Hiroshima Municipal Stadium	29,297
7	Carp – 8, Buffaloes – 3	November 2	Hiroshima Municipal Stadium	29,952

== See also ==
- 1980 World Series
