= Jim Lyttle =

American baseball player (born 1946)

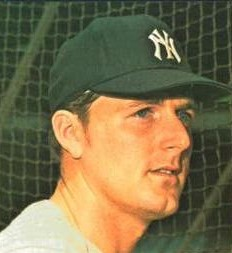
- Outfielder
- Born: May 20, 1946 (age 79); Hamilton, Ohio, U.S.
- Batted: Left Threw: Right

Professional debut
- MLB: May 17, 1969, for the New York Yankees
- NPB: April 2, 1977, for the Hiroshima Toyo Carp

Last appearance
- MLB: October 3, 1976, for the Los Angeles Dodgers
- NPB: October 10, 1983, for the Nankai Hawks

MLB statistics
- Batting average: .248
- Home runs: 9
- Runs batted in: 70

NPB statistics
- Batting average: .285
- Home runs: 166
- Runs batted in: 259
- Stats at Baseball Reference

Teams
- New York Yankees (1969–1971); Chicago White Sox (1972); Montreal Expos (1973–1976); Los Angeles Dodgers (1976); Hiroshima Toyo Carp (1977–1982); Nankai Hawks (1983)

Career highlights and awards
- Japan Series MVP (1980)

James Lawrence Lyttle Jr. (born May 20, 1946) is an American former professional baseball player from Logan, Indiana. He played as an outfielder for the New York Yankees, Chicago White Sox, Montreal Expos, and Los Angeles Dodgers of the Major League Baseball (MLB). He also played seven seasons of baseball in Nippon Professional Baseball (NPB) with the Hiroshima Toyo Carp and Nankai Hawks.

== Early life ==
Jim Lyttle was a multi-sport athlete who achieved fame in Southeastern Indiana. A four-sport athlete at North Dearborn High School, he recorded a basketball school-record 1,072 career points, leading the Vikings to a 57-13 record and the first three sectional championships in school history in his three seasons. He was named all-conference, all-sectional and all-regional each three times, while also achieving widespread acclaim in baseball. He chose a scholarship to Florida State University because it represented the chance to play basketball and baseball (he averaged 14.1 points as a freshman and 12.4 points as a sophomore – scoring in double figures in 20 of 26 games) while also earning 1st team All-American baseball honors and being selected by the New York Yankees’ with the 10th pick in the 1st round of the 1966 amateur draft.

== Professional career ==
=== Major League Baseball career ===
Lyttle graduated from Florida State University, and was drafted in the first round of the 1966 amateur draft by the New York Yankees. He made his major league debut with the Yankees in 1969, and recorded a .310 batting average in 87 games in 1970. He was traded to the Chicago White Sox in 1971, and played in 42 games as a defensive backup with the White Sox before being sent off to various teams from 1973 to 1974. He spent parts of four years with the Montreal Expos, then ended his major league career with the Los Angeles Dodgers in 1976.

=== Nippon Professional Baseball career ===
He signed with the Hiroshima Toyo Carp in the Japanese Central League in 1977, and immediately became a vital part of the team in his first year, playing right field, and batting cleanup along with Koji Yamamoto and Sachio Kinugasa. The Carp won consecutive league championships from 1979 to 1980, and Lyttle contributed immensely to the team's Japan Series victory over the Kintetsu Buffaloes, where he was awarded the series MVP award. His strong arm won him the outfield Japanese golden glove award four years in a row from 1978, and he played his best season in 1981, leading the league in hits while slugging 33 home runs and 100 RBIs, with a .318 batting average. He also played in 472 consecutive games until 1981. He played six total seasons with the Carp; the longest of any non-Japanese player, and is regarded as the best non-Japanese player ever to play for the team. He spent the 1983 season with the Nankai Hawks before retiring.
