= Fukuchi (surname) =

Fukuchi (written: 福地) is a Japanese surname. Notable people with the surname include:

- Fukuchi Gen'ichirō (福地 源一郎, 1841–1906), Japanese critic and writer
- Kazuki Fukuchi (福地 寿樹, born 1975), Japanese baseball player
- Tsubasa Fukuchi (福地 翼, born 1980), Japanese manga artist
