= Tatsumi Une =

Japanese baseball player

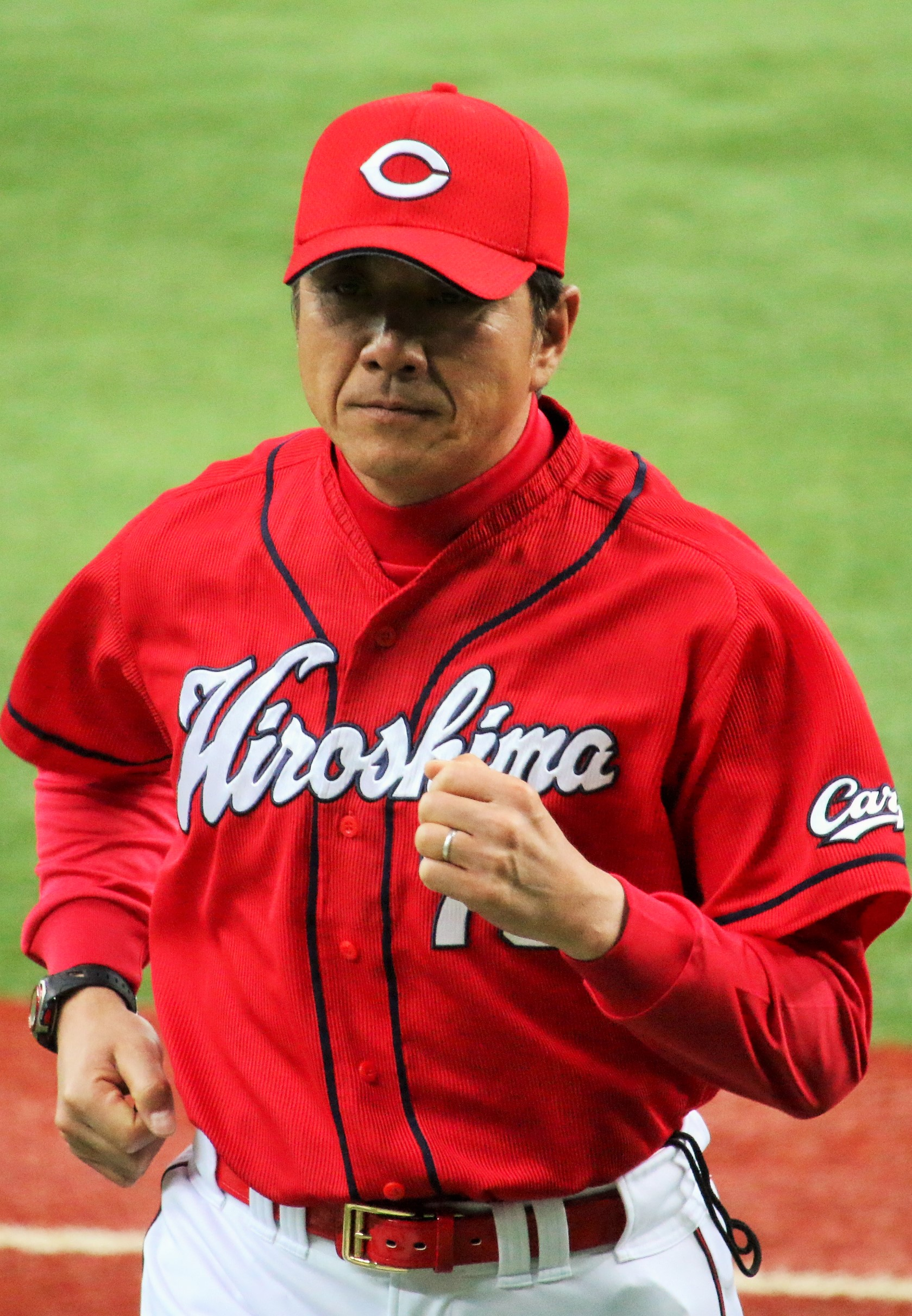

Hiroshima Toyo Carp – No. 78
- Pitcher / Coach
- Born: June 21, 1964 (age 61); Aki District, Hiroshima, Japan
- Batted: Left Threw: Left

NPB debut
- April 19, 1989, for the Hiroshima Toyo Carp

Last NPB appearance
- October 21, 1991, for the Hiroshima Toyo Carp

NPB statistics (through 1992)
- Win–loss record: 0-0
- Saves: 0
- ERA: 10.57
- Strikeouts: 5

Teams
- As player: Hiroshima Toyo Carp (1989–1992); As coach: Hiroshima Toyo Carp (2014–present)

Tatsumi Une (畝 龍実, Une Tatsumi; born June 21, 1964 in Aki District, Hiroshima, Japan) is a professional Japanese baseball player. As of November 2021 he was a coach of the Hiroshima Toyo Carp.
