= Junro Anan =

Japanese baseball player and manager (1937–2024)

- Infielder
- Born: September 2, 1937
- Died: July 30, 2024 (aged 86)
- Batted: Right Threw: Right

NPB debut
- 1956, for the Hiroshima Carp

Last appearance
- October 19, 1970, for the Kintetsu Buffaloes

NPB statistics (through 1970)
- Hits: 746
- Home runs: 34
- Base on balls: 221
- Runs batted in: 254
- Stolen Bases: 43
- Batting average: .218
- Slugging percentage: .267
- Stats at Baseball Reference

Teams
- As player: Hiroshima Carp/Hiroshima Toyo Carp (1956–1968); Kintetsu Buffaloes (1969–1970); As manager: Hiroshima Toyo Carp (1986–1988); As coach: Kintetsu Buffaloes (1971–1973); Hiroshima Toyo Carp (1974–1985)

Junro Anan (阿南 準郎, Anan Junrō; September 2, 1937 – July 30, 2024) was a Japanese professional baseball player who played for the Hiroshima Carp from 1956 to 1967. From 1968 to 1970 he played for the Kintetsu Buffaloes. He later served as a manager for Hiroshima. He played in the Japan Central League and the Japan Pacific League.

Anan was born on September 2, 1937. He died on July 30, 2024, at the age of 86. His former team, Hiroshima, wore badges of mourning and displayed flags at half-mast during the game following his death.
