= Mitsuo Tatsukawa =

Japanese baseball player and coach (born 1955)

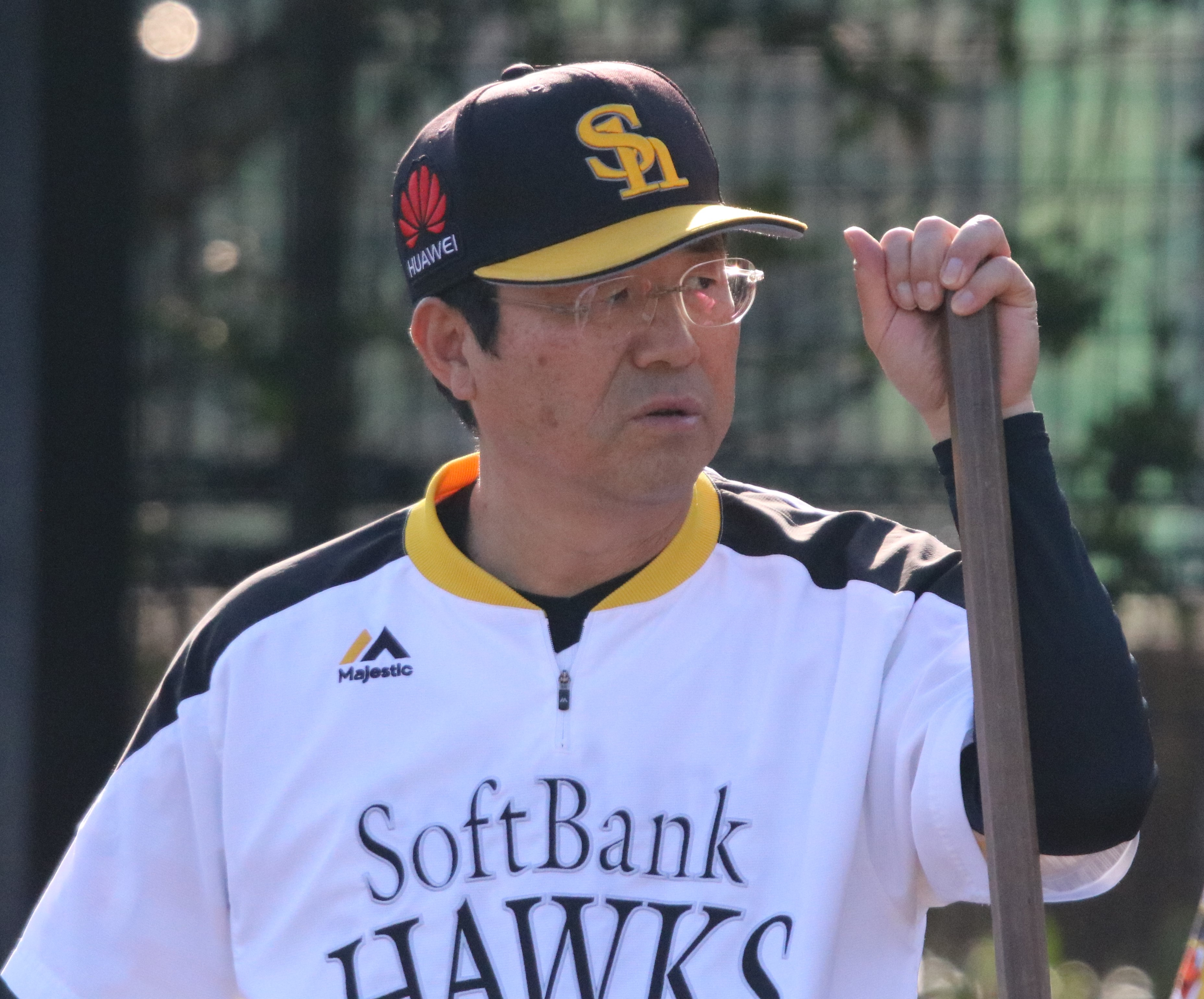
- Catcher
- Born: July 13, 1955 (age 70); Hiroshima, Ibaraki
- Batted: Right Threw: Right

NPB debut
- July 11, 1978, for the Hiroshima Toyo Carp

Last NPB appearance
- October 4, 1992, for the Hiroshima Toyo Carp

NPB statistics (through 1992)
- Batting average: .246
- Home runs: 51
- Hits: 895
- Stats at Baseball Reference

Teams
- As player: Hiroshima Toyo Carp (1978–1992); As manager: Hiroshima Toyo Carp (1999–2000); As coach: Fukuoka Daiei Hawks (1995); Hiroshima Toyo Carp (1998); Hanshin Tigers (2003); Chunichi Dragons (2014–2015); Fukuoka SoftBank Hawks (2017–2018)

Career highlights and awards
- 7× NPB All-Star (1983, 1986–1989, 1991–1992); 3× Central League Best Nine Award (1984, 1986, 1988); 3× Central League Golden Glove Award (1984, 1986, 1988)
- Last updated on: 9 January 2019

Mitsuo Tatsukawa (達川 光男, Tatsukawa Mitsuo; born July 13, 1955 in Hiroshima, Hiroshima Prefecture, Japan) is a former Nippon Professional Baseball catcher.
