= Sō Tsutsui =

Japanese baseball player (born 1974)

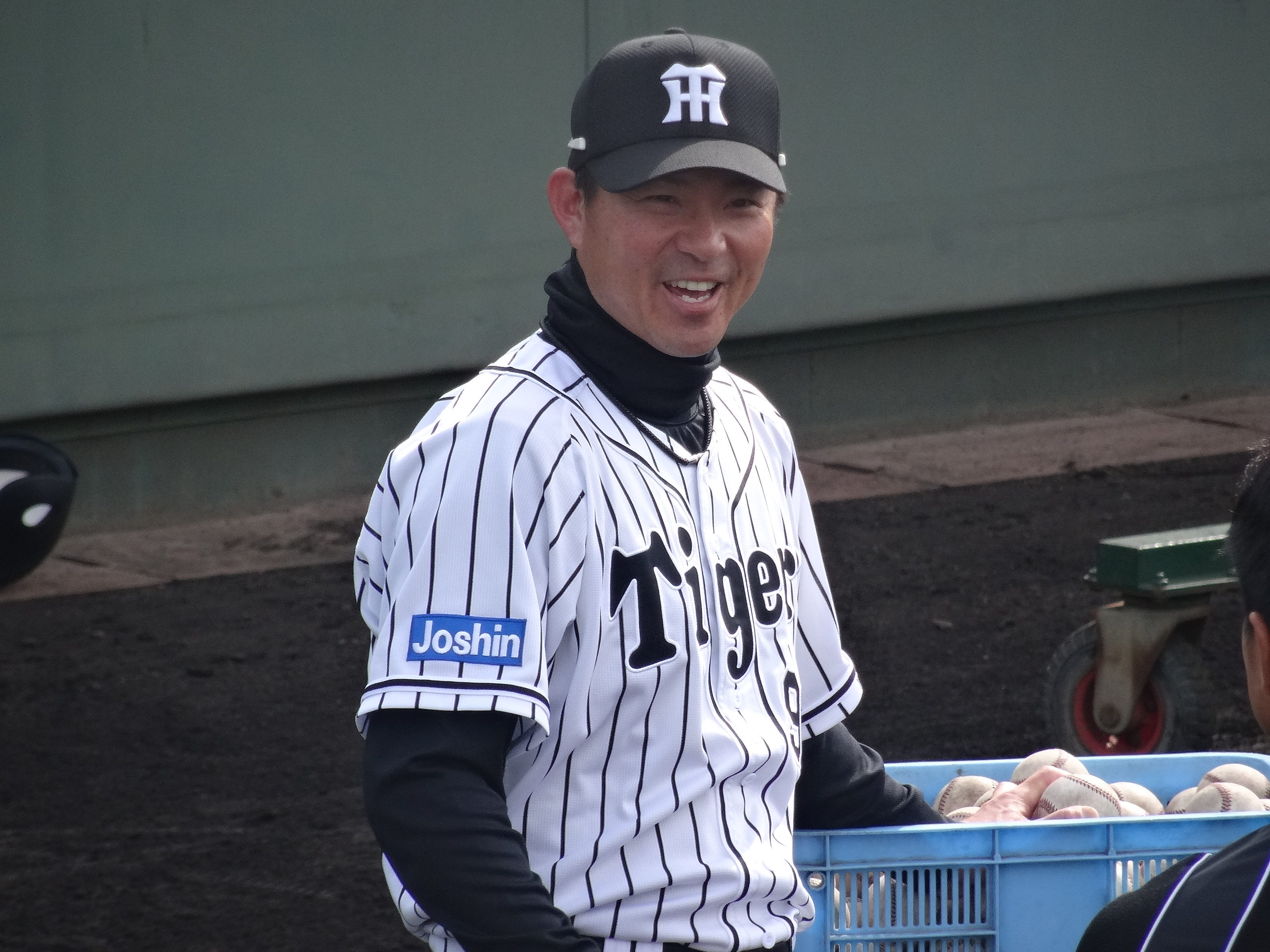

Hanshin Tigers – No. 96
- Infielder / Coach
- Born: November 1, 1974 (age 51); Ibaraki, Osaka, Japan
- Batted: Right Threw: Right

NPB debut
- April 15, 1997, for the Chunichi Dragons

Last NPB appearance
- August 8, 2004, for the Chunichi Dragons

NPB statistics
- Batting average: .232
- Hits: 61
- Home runs: 2
- Runs batted in: 18
- Stolen bases: 1
- Stats at Baseball Reference

Teams
- As player: Chunichi Dragons (1997–2004); Hanshin Tigers (2005–2006); As coach: Hanshin Tigers (2007–present)

Sō Tsutsui (筒井 壮, Tsutsui Sō; born November 1, 1974) is a former professional baseball player from Ibaraki, Osaka, Japan.
