= Masaaki Daito =

Japanese baseball player (born 1973)

Masaaki Daito (大塔 正明, Daitō Masaaki; born 5 April 1973) is a former baseball player from Japan. He played in the Central League for the Chunichi Dragons.
