= Toyo Asayama =

Japanese baseball player (born 1976)

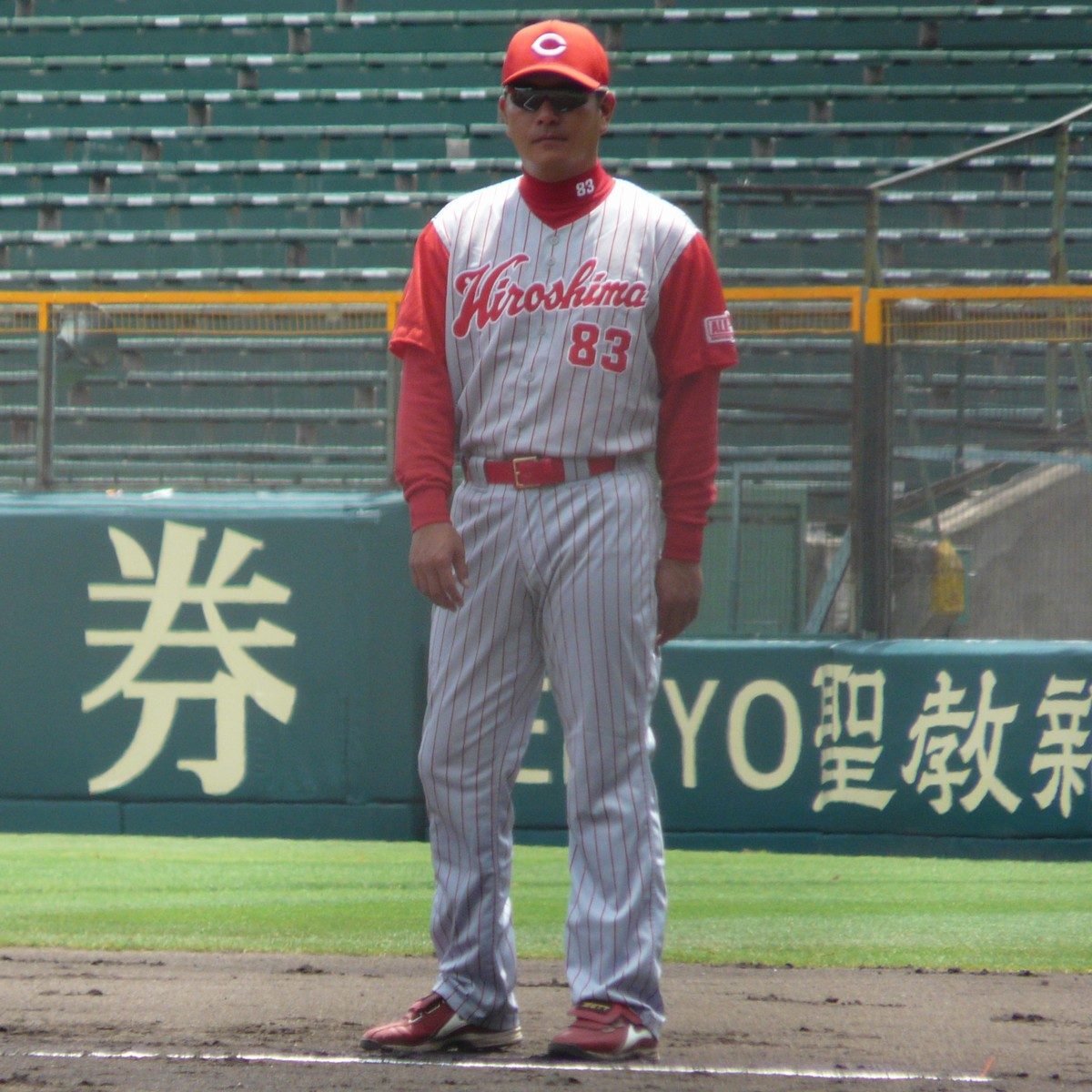

Hiroshima Toyo Carp – No. 83
- Outfielder
- Born: July 29, 1976 (age 49); Kurume, Fukuoka, Japan
- Batted: Right Threw: Right

NPB debut
- April 4, 1999, for the Hiroshima Toyo Carp

Last appearance
- October 14, 2004, for the Hiroshima Toyo Carp

NPB statistics (through 2004 season)
- Batting average: .219
- Hits: 49
- Home runs: 8
- RBIs: 25
- Stolen Bases: 6
- Stats at Baseball Reference

Teams
- As player: Hiroshima Toyo Carp (1999 – 2004); As coach: Hiroshima Toyo Carp (2005 – )

Toyo Asayama (朝山 東洋, Asayama Toyo; born July 29, 1976) is a former Nippon Professional Baseball outfielder for the Hiroshima Toyo Carp.
