= Sachio Kinugasa =

Japanese baseball player (1947–2018)

Sachio Kinugasa 衣笠祥雄
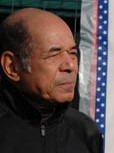
- Kinugasa in 2011
- Third baseman
- Born: January 18, 1947; Higashiyama-ku, Kyoto, Empire of Japan
- Died: April 23, 2018 (aged 71); Tokyo, Japan
- Batted: Right Threw: Right

NPB debut
- May 16, 1965, for the Hiroshima Carp

Last NPB appearance
- October 22, 1987, for the Hiroshima Carp

NPB statistics
- Batting average: .270
- Hits: 2,543
- Runs batted in: 1,448
- Home runs: 504
- Stolen bases: 266

Teams
- Hiroshima Carp/Hiroshima Toyo Carp (1965–1987)

Career highlights and awards
- 13× NPB All-Star (1971, 1974–1977, 1980–1987); 3× Central League Best Nine Award (1975, 1980, 1984); Central League stolen bases leader (1976); 3× Central League Golden Glove Award (1980, 1984, 1986); Central League MVP (1984); Central League RBI leader (1984); Matsutaro Shoriki Award (1984); People's Honour Award (1987); Hiroshima Toyo Carp #3 retired; NPB record 2,215 consecutive games played; NPB record 5-game home run streak

Member of the Japanese

Baseball Hall of Fame
- Induction: 1996

Sachio Kinugasa (衣笠 祥雄; January 18, 1947 – April 23, 2018) was a Japanese professional baseball third baseman for the Hiroshima Toyo Carp of the Nippon Professional Baseball league from 1965 to 1987. He was nicknamed Tetsujin, meaning "Iron Man". He played in a record-breaking 2,215 consecutive games, having surpassed Lou Gehrig's record by 1987.

Kinugasa is mostly remembered for his consecutive-game streak, but he ranks seventh in Nippon Professional Baseball in career home runs (504), 5th in career hits (2543) and 10th in career RBIs (1448), showing that he was one of the most consistent hitters in Japanese baseball. He was inducted into the Japanese Baseball Hall of Fame in 1996.

== Biography ==
Kinugasa's mother was Japanese and she raised him by herself. Kinugasa's father was an African American serviceman who was stationed in Japan after World War II. He reported that he never met his father.

== Playing career ==
Kinugasa entered Heian High School in Kyoto, and advanced to the Japanese National High School Baseball Championship twice in his senior year as a catcher. He was signed by the Hiroshima Carp in 1965, and spent several years in the minors before an arm injury led him to being converted into a first baseman in 1968. He became the team's regular first baseman, hitting 21 home runs with a .276 batting average. In 1975, he moved to third base at the suggestion of manager Joe Lutz, and his efforts helped the Hiroshima Carp win their first ever league championship. He led the league in stolen bases in 1976, and won the Central League's Most Valuable Player award in 1984 as his team won the Japanese championship series.

Nicknamed Tetsujin (Iron Man), after the robot manga "Tetsujin 28" (Known as Gigantor in the United States), Kinugasa played in games even when he was badly injured, including with bone fractures. He last missed a game on October 18, 1970, and set the Japanese consecutive games played record with his 1,247th consecutive game on August 2, 1980. He tied Lou Gehrig's record of 2,130 consecutive games played on June 11, 1987. He surpassed Gehrig in an 8–3 Carp loss to the Chunichi Dragons two days later on June 13. He was honored for his achievement by the sellout crowd at Hiroshima Municipal Stadium after the game in which he had also hit a home run in the eighth inning. Kinugasa retired after the 1987 season, ending his career with 2,215 consecutive games played, 2,543 hits, and 504 home runs. His consecutive games played streak was broken in 1996 by Cal Ripken Jr., who played in 2,632 straight games in Major League Baseball.

== Retirement ==
Following his retirement from baseball, Kinugasa became a sports commentator. He was inducted into the Japanese Baseball Hall of Fame in 1996.

Kinugasa died of colon cancer on April 23, 2018.

== Awards and accolades ==
Kinugasa was given the People's Honour Award for his performance in the professional leagues. He is the second baseball player, following Sadaharu Oh and followed by Shigeo Nagashima and Hideki Matsui, to have received the award.

== Pop culture ==
The character of Mitsuo from the Yakuza series is based on Kinugasa, as he too is a half African-American baseball player who never met his father.

== See also ==
- List of top Nippon Professional Baseball home run hitters
- Matsutaro Shoriki Award (1984)
