= Kazuki Fukuchi =

Japanese baseball player (born 1975)

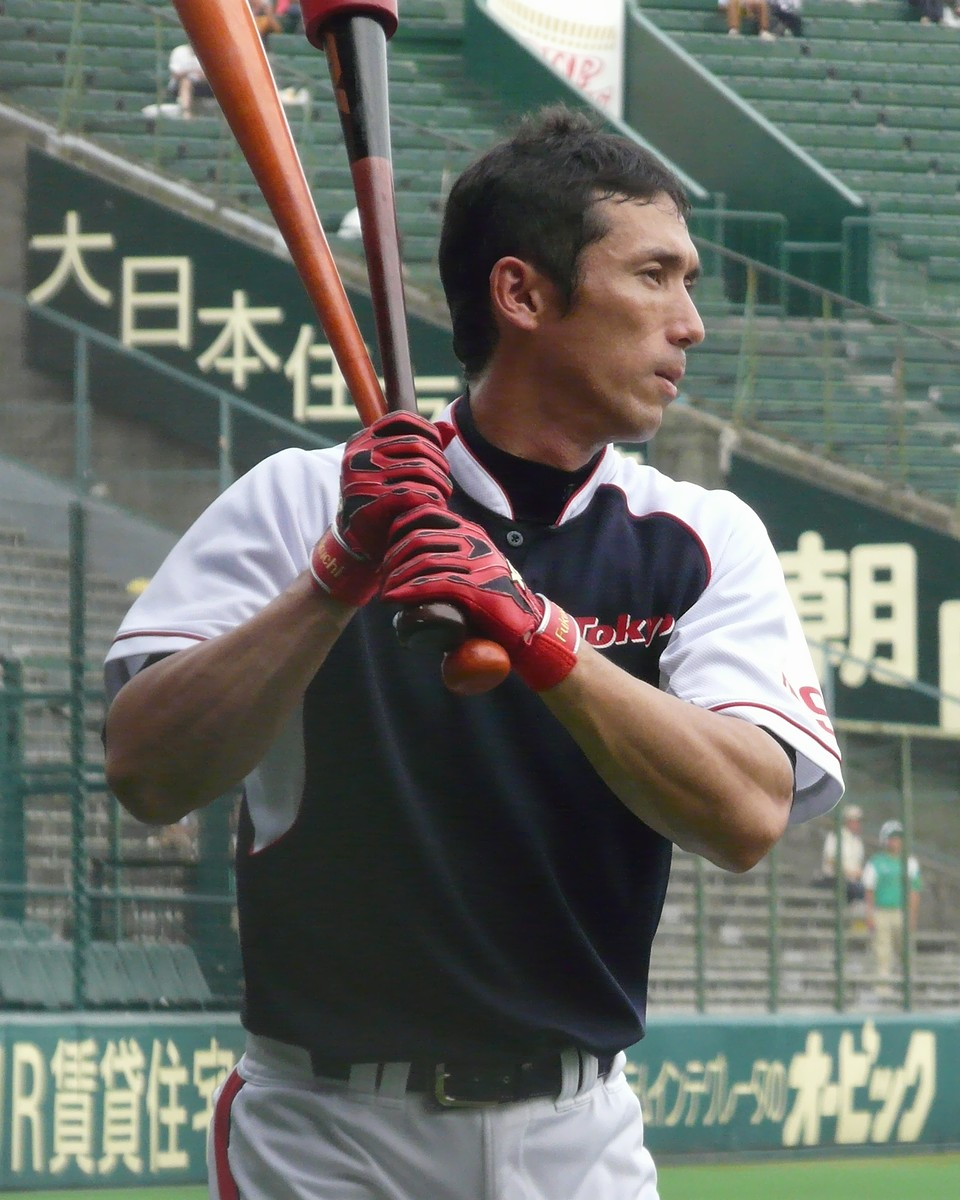
- Fukuchi with the Tokyo Yakult Swallows

Hiroshima Toyo Carp – No. 85
- Outfielder / Coach
- Born: December 17, 1975 (age 49); Kishima District, Saga, Japan
- Batted: Both Threw: Right

NPB debut
- October 10, 1997, for the Hiroshima Toyo Carp

Last NPB appearance
- October 15, 2012, for the Tokyo Yakult Swallows

NPB statistics (through 2012)
- Batting average: .272
- Home runs: 20
- Hits: 650

Teams
- As player: Hiroshima Toyo Carp (1994–2005); Seibu Lions (2006–2007); Tokyo Yakult Swallows (2008–2012); As coach: Tokyo Yakult Swallows (2013–2021); Hiroshima Toyo Carp (2023-)

Career highlights and awards
- 2× Central League stolen base champion (2008, 2009)
- Last updated on: 8 December 2022

Kazuki Fukuchi (福地 寿樹, Fukuchi Kazuki; born December 17, 1975 in Kishima District, Saga) is a former Nippon Professional Baseball outfielder.
