= Shimonoseki Baseball Stadium =

Former baseball stadium in Shimonoseki, Yamaguchi, Japan

The Shimonoseki Baseball Stadium (下関球場, Shimonoseki Kyūjō) is a former baseball stadium in Japan. It was considered to be a tiny stadium that fit 20-30 thousand people. The Nippon League Taiyo Whales played there. It was used by the Whales from 1950 to 1952.
