= Nisshin =

Nisshin, Nissin (pronounced the same, written as 日清, 日新, 日真, etc. in Japanese) may refer to:

== Geography ==
- 日進市: Nisshin, Aichi, a city in Aichi Prefecture, Japan, near the city of Nagoya
- 日進村: Nisshin, Saitama, a former town that is now Kita ward of the city of Saitama, Saitama

== Companies ==
Several unrelated companies:

=== 日清 ===
- Nissin Foods, worldwide instant ramen maker
- Nisshin Seifun Group
- Nisshinbo Industries, maker of car brakes

=== 日新 ===
- Nisshin Steel

=== 日信 ===
- Nissin Kogyo, maker of car and motorcycle brakes, a Honda keiretsu company

=== 日伸 ===
- Nisshin Onpa, maker of guitar effects under the Maxon brand

== Other uses ==
- 日親: Nisshin (monk) (1407–1488)
- 日真: the name of several monks of Nichiren Buddhism and Nichiren Shoshu
- 日進: name given to several ships of the Imperial Japanese Navy, including:
  - Japanese cruiser Nisshin that served in the Battle of Tsushima
  - Japanese seaplane carrier Nisshin that was sunk in the Bougainville Strait in July 1943
  - Nisshin (Japanese warship), launched in 1869

== See also ==
- 日新丸: Nisshin Maru, a Japanese whaling ship that was targeted by activist group Sea Shepherd in February 2007
