= Hiroshima Sogo Ground Baseball Park =

Multi-purpose stadium in Hiroshima, Japan

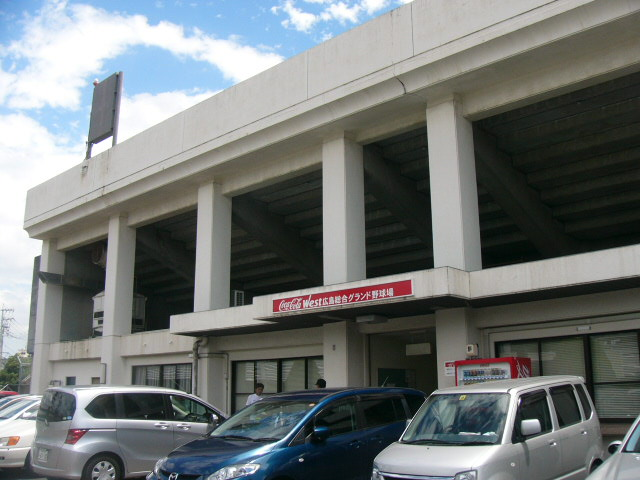
- Interactive map of Hiroshima Sogo Ground Baseball Park
- Full name: Hiroshima Sogo Ground Baseball Park
- Location: Hiroshima, Japan
- Capacity: 13,000

Construction
- Opened: 1941

Tenant
- Hiroshima Toyo Carp (1950-1957)

Hiroshima Sogo Ground Baseball Park is a multi-purpose stadium in Hiroshima, Japan. It is mostly for baseball matches and hosted the Hiroshima Toyo Carp from 1950 to 1957, prior to the Hiroshima Municipal Stadium opening in 1957. The stadium was originally opened in 1941 and had a capacity of 13,000 spectators.
