= Manabu Kitabeppu =

Japanese baseball player (1957–2023)

Manabu Kitabeppu 北別府 学
- Pitcher
- Born: July 12, 1957; Soo, Kagoshima, Japan
- Died: June 16, 2023 (aged 65); Hiroshima, Japan
- Batted: Right Threw: Right

NPB debut
- September 16, 1976, for the Hiroshima Carp

Last NPB appearance
- August 21, 1994, for the Hiroshima Carp

NPB statistics
- Win–loss: 213-141
- Shutouts: 28
- Highest win rate: 81.8% (18-4) (1986)
- Win rate average: 60.2%
- Earned run average: 3.67
- Strikeouts: 1757

Teams
- As player: Hiroshima Toyo Carp (1976–1994); As pitching coach: Hiroshima Toyo Carp (2001–2004)

Career highlights and awards
- 1986 Central League MVP; 2x Eiji Sawamura Award (1982, 1986); 2x NPB Win Champion (1982, 1986); 3x NPB Win Rate Champion (1980–1981, 1991); NPB ERA Champion (1986); 2x NPB MVP for Pitching (1982, 1986); 2x Best Nine Award (1982, 1986); Golden Glove Award (1986); 7x NPB All-Star (1979–1980, 1982–1984, 1988, 1992); #20 Honored Numbers of Hiroshima Carp

Member of the Japanese

Baseball Hall of Fame
- Induction: 2012

Manabu Kitabeppu (北別府 学, Kitabeppu Manabu; July 12, 1957 – June 16, 2023) was a Japanese professional baseball pitcher, the first-round draft pick of the Hiroshima Toyo Carp in 1975, and one of the most famous Japanese right-handed pitchers. He was known as the "Precision Machine" (精密機械, Seimitsu-Kikai) because of his perfect control pitching, and his nickname was Pei-San (ペイさん).

Kitabeppu struggled his first few seasons, then went 17–11 with a 3.58 ERA to make his first All-Star team in 1979. It was the first of five consecutive All-Star picks for Kitabeppu, who helped the team to a Japan Series title in 1980.

In 1982 Kitabeppu went 20–8 with a 2.43 ERA, easily his best year up to that point in his pitching career. He led the Central League with 267.3 innings, won the most games on the mound, and was fourth in ERA. He won his first Eiji Sawamura Award that season and also was named to the Best Nine.

His streak of All-Star selections ended in 1984, though he continued to pitch well in '84 and '85. In 1986 Kitabeppu had his best season, going 18–4 with a 2.43 ERA. He led the circuit once again in victories, won his only ERA crown, led in complete games (17) and shutouts (4), won his only Gold Glove, and in addition to the Best Nine and Sawamura, won his only MVP award as the Carp returned to the Japan Series, but failed to win.

Kitabeppu again was an All-Star in '88 but posted losing records from '87 through '89, once with an ERA of 5.48. The former star allowed the most runs in 1988 (87) and the most homers (22). The next season, he again surrendered the most home runs, also 22. In 1989 he was in the minor leagues for the first time in his career.

Kitabeppu emerged resurgent from his trials and after a decent season in 1990, in 1991 he went 11–4 with a 3.38 ERA. He made his seventh All-Star team in 1992, with 14 wins in 22 decisions, and a 2.58 ERA. It was his lowest ERA and most victories since his MVP season of '86. The Carp made their third Japan Series of the Kitabeppu era, but lost to the Seibu Lions. Still just 34, Kitabeppu reached 200 career wins.

It was his last good season – he would pitch 24 more games, going 9-9, with ERAs over 5 each time, before retiring. His career line with Hiroshima was 213–141 with a 3.67 ERA.

Since Kitabeppu, only one pitcher in Nippon Pro Baseball (Kimiyasu Kudoh) has reached 200 victories. Kitabeppu ranks 17th all-time in wins, 20th in innings (3,113), 26th in strikeouts (1,757), 9th in hits allowed (3,225), and 4th in homers surrendered (380, the Central League record).

After retiring, Kitabeppu became an announcer and then the pitching coach for the Carp.

Shortly after midnight on June 16, 2023, he died in a hospital in the city of Hiroshima. He was 65. In 2020 he announced that he had been battling leukemia for a long time.

== Career ==
- 1st pitch, September 16, 1976
- 1st win, October 12, 1976
- MVP in the Japanese Central League, 1986
- Eiji Sawamura Award winner, 1982 and 1986
- Greatest Number of Wins, 1982 and 1986
- Best Winning Average, 1980, 1981 and 1991
- Best ERA, 1986
- Best Nine of the year, 1982 and 1986
- Gold Glove Award winner, 1986
- Japan All-star game, 1979, 1980, 1982, 1983, 1984, 1988 and 1992
- Hiroshima Prefectural Prize of Honour, 1994
- 213 W, 5 S, 135 CG, 28 Shutouts and 1757 K.
- Hiroshima Carp Pitching Coach from 2001 to 2004

=== statistics ===
Year	Team	No.	GP	W	L	S	IP	K	ERA	Titles
1976	Hiroshima	20	9	2	1	0	29.1	18	4.03	
1977	Hiroshima	20	33	5	7	0	131.2	90	5.32	
1978	Hiroshima	20	39	10	7	0	177.0	98	4.58	
1979	Hiroshima	20	36	17	11	0	215.2	155	3.58	League Champion, Japan Series Champion
1980	Hiroshima	20	30	12	5	0	177.2	82	4.04	Best Winning Average, League Champion, Japan Series Champion
1981	Hiroshima	20	32	16	10	0	226.1	123	3.31	Best Winning Average
1982	Hiroshima	20	36	20	8	0	267.1	184	2.43	Sawamura Award winner, Greatest Number of Wins, Best 9
1983	Hiroshima	20	33	12	13	0	215.2	106	3.96	
1984	Hiroshima	20	32	13	8	2	203.2	99	3.31	League Champion, Japan Series Champion
1985	Hiroshima	20	35	16	6	2	199.0	85	3.57	
1986	Hiroshima	20	30	18	4	0	230.0	123	2.43	MVP, Sawamura Award winner, Greatest Number of Wins, Best ERA, Best 9, Gold Glove Award, League Champion
1987	Hiroshima	20	29	10	14	0	181.1	119	4.37	
1988	Hiroshima	20	27	11	12	0	209.2	112	3.13	
1989	Hiroshima	20	22	9	10	0	110.0	69	5.48	
1990	Hiroshima	20	17	8	4	0	98.1	58	4.39	
1991	Hiroshima	20	25	11	4	0	141.1	73	3.38	Best Winning Average, League Champion
1992	Hiroshima	20	26	14	8	0	181.1	101	2.58	
1993	Hiroshima	20	13	6	6	0	69.0	38	5.22	
1994	Hiroshima	20	11	3	3	0	50.2	24	5.68	
TOTALS		–	515	213	141	5	3113.0	1757	3.67	-
