= Hiroshima Toyo Carp =

Japanese professional baseball team

- 広島東洋カープ

Logo	Cap insignia

Information
- League: Nippon Professional Baseball Central League (1950–present)
- Location: Minami-ku, Hiroshima, Hiroshima, Japan
- Ballpark: Mazda Zoom-Zoom Stadium Hiroshima
- Founded: December 5, 1949; 76 years ago
- Nickname(s): Koi (鯉, carp)
- Japan Series championships: 3 (1979, 1980, 1984)
- CL pennants: 9 (1975, 1979, 1980, 1984, 1986, 1991, 2016, 2017, 2018)
- Playoff berths: 6 (2013, 2014, 2016, 2017, 2018, 2023)
- Former name: Hiroshima Carp (1950–1967)
- Former ballparks: Hiroshima Municipal Stadium (1957–2008); Hiroshima Sogo Ground Baseball Park (1950–1957)
- Colors: Red, White, Navy
- Mascot: Slyly
- Retired numbers: 3, 8, 15
- Ownership: Hajime Matsuda
- Management: Matsuda family
- Manager: Takahiro Arai
- Website: https://www.carp.co.jp/

Current uniforms

(video) Number 18, Kenta Maeda, pitching a ball.

The Hiroshima Toyo Carp (広島東洋カープ, Hiroshima Tōyō Kāpu) are a professional baseball team based in Hiroshima, Japan. They compete in the Central League of Nippon Professional Baseball, playing their home games at Mazda Zoom-Zoom Stadium Hiroshima.

The Carp were founded in 1949, four years after the atomic bombing of Hiroshima. The team struggled to find success in their early years and faced serious financial issues, but narrowly escaped merger and contraction plans through the fundraising of Hiroshima citizens and fans. The team found stability over the next two decades, eventually rising to their first Central League pennant in 1975, and winning the 1979 Japan Series. In appreciation of their emergence alongside the reconstruction of Hiroshima, the Carp are regarded "as a symbol of Hiroshima's recovery".

In modern times, the team has the longest championship drought in the NPB. They have not won the Japan Series since 1984, and are the only NPB team to not win a Japan Series in the 21st century. Through 2026, the franchise's all-time record is 4,812–5,168–391 (.482). The team's current manager is Takahiro Arai.

== History ==
=== Early years ===
The Nippon Professional Baseball league was planned to be split into two separate leagues in 1949, and Hiroshima prefecture decided to establish a professional baseball team as part of the reconstruction process after the atomic bombings of Hiroshima and Nagasaki. The team joined the Central League in December 1949 as the Hiroshima Carp. They were named the Carp after the koi fish that climbed the rapids of Hiroshima Castle, chosen to signify Hiroshima's rebirth and perseverance following the aforementioned atomic bombings. Said name was put forth by a politician named Noboru Tanigawa, who was the face of Hiroshima's bid. Another name put forward was Greens, after a successful semi-professional team of the same name. Others included Bears, Rainbows, Doves, and morbidly, Atoms. However, all the names were put aside, as Tanigawa was so influential to the team's bid, he always had the final decision.

The team's first home field was a prefecture-funded stadium, and the team's lack of sponsorship made it extremely difficult to recruit players. Manager Hideichi Ishimoto had to personally scout players just to form a starting lineup. The ragtag team ended up in last place from 1950 to 1951.

The team's lack of funding became an even more serious problem in 1951, and it was proposed by NPB that the team be disbanded, or merge with the Taiyo Whales team, which was based in Shimonoseki, Yamaguchi at the time. Hiroshima citizens strongly protested against disbanding the team, and raised the money needed to keep the team through donations.

The Central League had seven teams in 1952, making it complicated to form a coherent schedule for each team. Therefore, it was decided that any team that ended the season with a winning percentage below .300 would be disbanded or merged with another team. This agreement may have targeted the Carp, since the team had been in last place every season. The team won only 37 games in 1952, mostly on the back of ace Ryōhei Hasegawa, but ended with a .316 winning percentage, saving itself from being disbanded. The Shochiku Robins ended the season in last place with a .288 winning percentage, and was merged with the Taiyo Whales. While the Robins "merged" with the Whales, since technically the Robins were jettisoned from NPB and folded, this left most of their star players as free agents; Hiroshima signed most of them as a result.

The team's financial plight only worsened in the following years, and the team could only issue one uniform per player in 1953. Nevertheless, the team continued to play each season. The team moved to the newly constructed Hiroshima Municipal Stadium in central Hiroshima in July 1957. Finally, in 1960, they ended the season above the .500 mark.

In 1968, the Toyo Kogyo company became the team's chief sponsor, and the company name was inserted to become the Hiroshima Toyo Carp. The company was renamed Mazda in 1984 after the Matsuda family sold their stakes in the company to Ford, but kept their 60% stake in the team, which they hold onto to this very day. The Toyo name remains memorialized in the name of the baseball team, although the team is rarely mentioned by its full name; only in the draft and in official news outlets. The team ended the season above 3rd place for the first time the year corporate sponsorship started, but fell back into last place from 1972 to 1974. The Hiroshima Carp were also the last Japanese team to have a non-Japanese player on its roster (excluding Japanese-Americans). Zoilo Versalles, the 1965 American League MVP, was the first non-Japanese player to play for the Carp.

=== "Akaheru" golden age ===
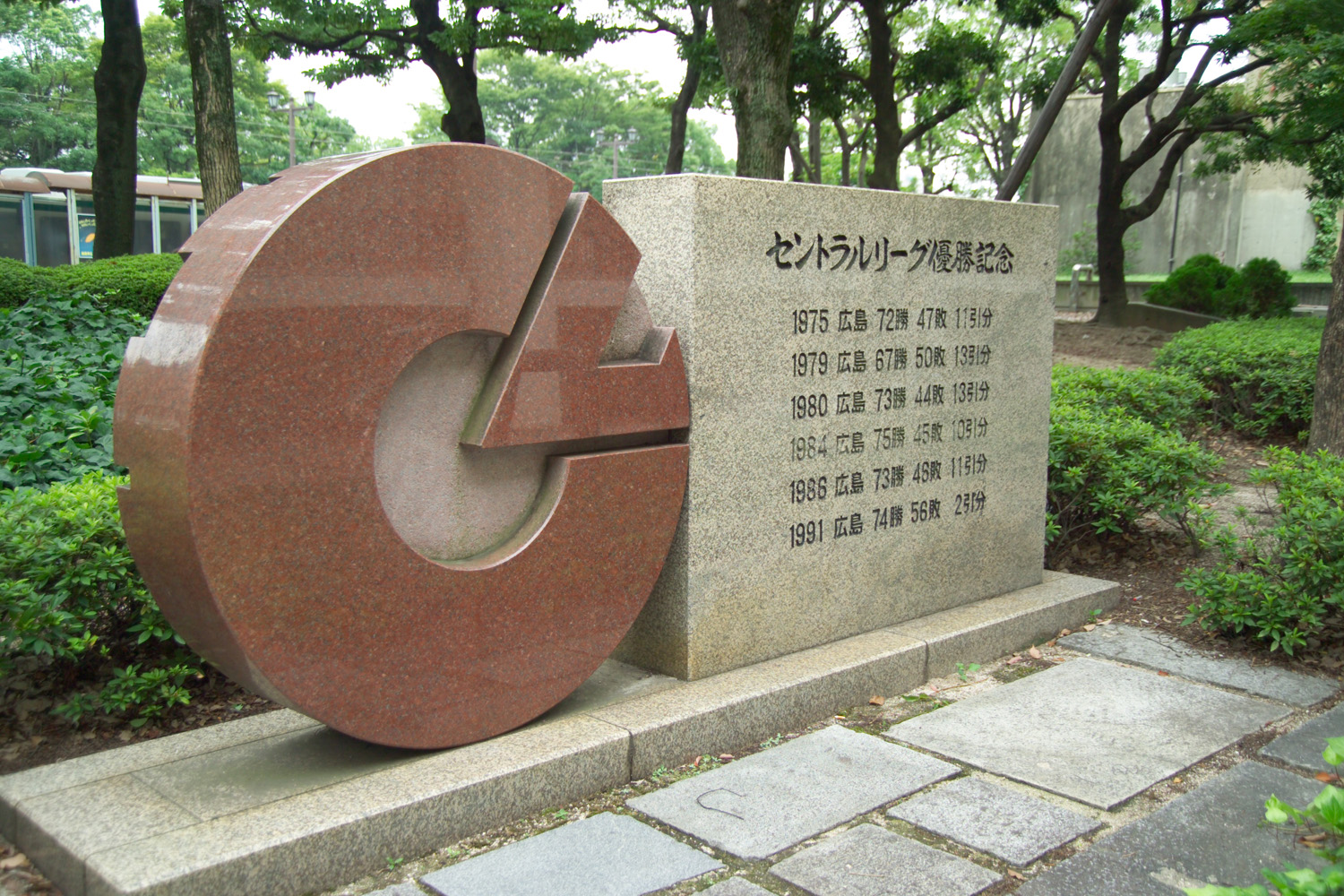
A memorial plaque listing the team's Central League championships located next to old Hiroshima Municipal Stadium.

Red became the new team color in 1973, and the team's uniforms were redesigned. The current team uniform still resembles the 1973 design. The team logo was also changed from a letter "H" to a red wishbone-"C" in imitation of the Cincinnati Reds logo. The letter H logo still is used as the club's flag logo insignia.

The team hired its first non-Japanese manager, Joe Lutz, in 1975, becoming the first Japanese professional team to hire a foreign manager. Lutz ordered the team's cap to be changed to red to symbolize a never-ending fighting spirit, and he hired Gail Hopkins and Richie Scheinblum. A month into the season, Lutz and the Carp parted ways as he decided to quit since he felt umpires were calling games against the Carp. However, the team won its first ever league championship in 1975 to begin a memorable series of seasons with Lutz's replacement Takeshi Koba. The Hankyu Braves would "sweep" them in 6 games, due to there being 2 ties in games 1 and 4.

The Carp team became a powerhouse in 1978, hitting over 200 home runs in one season for the first time in Japanese baseball history. Koji Yamamoto, Sachio Kinugasa, Jim Lyttle and Adrian Garrett formed the powerful Akaheru (meaning "Red Helmet") lineup, which won two consecutive pennants and Japan Series from 1979 to 1980, both against the Kintetsu Buffaloes. As of 2023, they remain the last Central League team to win back-to-back Japan Series rings. A strong pitching staff led to another Japan Series win in 1984 against the Braves. Koba retired in 1985, but the team still won the pennant the following year, losing to the Seibu Lions in 8 games. As of 2024, they are the last team to make it to the Japan Series without a single foreign player, including players on the postseason roster. (The Orix Buffaloes would make it to the Japan Series in 2022 without a foreign batter, with the only foreigner on their postseason roster being pitcher Jacob Waguespack, although Central League wouldn't see the Climax Series for another 22 years.) The year after that, Kinugasa would break Lou Gehrig's consecutive games played streak, and would hold on to it until Cal Ripken Jr would break Gehrig's record, then his own in 1996.

Star player Koji Yamamoto became manager in 1989, and the team won yet another pennant in 1991. However, the team fell into last place in 1993, and Yamamoto resigned from his position.

=== Dark years ===
The Carp would endure a lengthy period without success after their 1991 pennant.

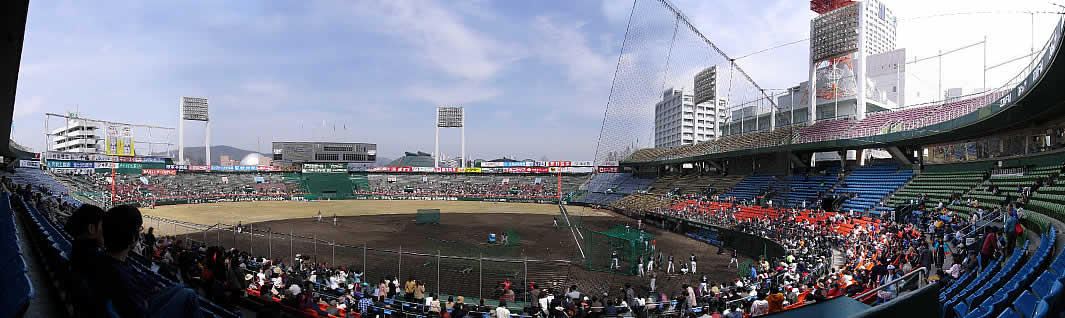
View from Hiroshima Municipal Stadium on March 14, 2004.

One of the major reasons for the team's fall after that 1991 pennant was the lack of financial support it received from its sponsors. The team never signed any free agents, and was often forced to let go of star players because they could no longer pay their salaries (recent examples include Tomoaki Kanemoto, Akira Etoh, Andy Sheets, Nate Minchey, John Bale, Greg LaRocca and Takahiro Arai).

Marty Brown became the manager in 2006, becoming the team's first non-Japanese manager in 31 years (since Joe Lutz). The team set a new record in April, 2006, scoring only 2 runs for the first 9 games of the season. Though still not finishing above third, the team concentrated on developing potential young players. In 2008, even though they were expected to finish last place as both the ace Hiroki Kuroda and slugger Takahiro Arai were gone by free agency, their chance of entering of playoffs was not eliminated until the very end of the season (when only 3 games remained), and they finished fourth, closely behind the Chunichi Dragons.

Beginning with the 2009 season, the team's home has been the New Hiroshima Municipal Stadium, also known as Mazda Zoom-Zoom Stadium, in the Minami (South) Ward of Hiroshima.

=== A period of revival ===
After years of futility, the Carp finally regained success in 2016, finishing the regular season with NPB's best record and defeating the Yokohama DeNA BayStars in the Climax Series Final to advance to their first Japan Series since 1991, where they faced the Hokkaido Nippon-Ham Fighters. The Carp won the first two games of the series at home, but the Fighters would win the next four games en route to the championship. After the season, Hiroki Kuroda—who had returned to the Carp in 2015 following a stint in Major League Baseball—retired.

The Carp again finished with the Central League's best record in 2017, but were upset by the BayStars in a rematch of the previous year's Climax Series Final.

In 2018, the Carp captured another Central League Pennant and swept the Yomiuri Giants in the Climax Series Final. However, they once again came up short in the Japan Series, falling to the Fukuoka SoftBank Hawks in five games.

The Carp finished the 2019 campaign in fourth place, missing the playoffs by a half game and ending the team's run of three consecutive Central League Pennants. In 2020, the Carp finished 5th and missed the playoffs for a second consecutive year. The Carp would finish in 4th place in the 2021 season, losing a playoff spot by just 2 games.

The 2022 season would begin with a major loss for the Carp, losing star player Seiya Suzuki after being posted to the Chicago Cubs. Despite the setback, Hiroshima began the season 8-4 in their first 12 games. Despite the strong start, they missed out on the playoffs again, going 66-74-3.

The Carp were underdogs going into the 2023 season and were predicted to finish in last place. Ultimately, they rallied back, finishing 74-65-4 and beating out the third-place BayStars by only one loss. In the first stage of the Central League Climax Series, the Carp beat the BayStars in two straight games, but lost three straight games in the final stage to the top-ranked Hanshin Tigers.

On June 7, 2024, in a game against the Chiba Lotte Marines, Daichi Ohsera became the 7th pitcher in team history and the 102nd in NPB history to pitch a no-hitter.

== Uniforms ==
The former uniforms of the Hiroshima Toyo Carp are similar to the Cincinnati Reds of the MLB. The original uniforms of the Hiroshima Carp are descendants of the uniforms worn by the University of Chicago's varsity baseball team, which toured Japan in 1912 playing against major university teams. One team they played was Chuo University who copied the uniforms including the distinctive "C" logo. Alumni of the Chuo University team helped in founding the Hiroshima Carp.

== Current roster ==
Hiroshima Toyo Carp roster
First team		Second team
Pitchers: 13 Daisuke Moriura; 14 Daichi Osera; 16 Shohei Mori; 18 Masato Morishita; 19 Hiroki Tokoda; 20 Ryoji Kuribayashi; 21 Shota Nakazaki; 36 Atsuya Horie; 41 Kenya Suzuki; 42 Freddy Tarnok; 43 Sotaro Shimauchi; 53 Shun Okamoto; 65 Shogo Tamamura; 68 Taylor Hearn; 98 Taiga Tsuji; Catchers: 27 Tsubasa Aizawa; 31 Shogo Sakakura; 32 Tomoki Ishihara	Infielders: 00 Ryutaro Hatsuki; 0 Naru Katsuda; 4 Masaya Yano; 5 Kaito Kozono; 7 Shota Dobayashi; 10 Tai Sasaki; 33 Ryosuke Kikuchi; 95 Elehuris Montero; Outfielders: 9 Shogo Akiyama; 37 Takayoshi Noma; 52 Shota Suekane; 59 Minoru Ohmori; 61 Sandro Fabian; 96 Shosei Nakamura; Manager: 25 Takahiro Arai; Coaches Head coach: 77 Akihito Fujii; Outfield defense/Base running: 80 Masato Akamatsu; Infield defense/Base running: 90 Takumi Miyoshi; Hitting: 83 Toyo Asayama; 89 Tetsuya Kokubo; Pitching: 74 Katsuhiro Nagakawa; 86 Tsuyoshi Kikuchihara; Battery: 81 Yoshiyuki Ishihara	Pitchers: 11 Taichi Saito; 17 Hayato Tsunehiro; 22 Taichi Taka; 24 Takumi Kurohara; 26 Takehisa Masuda; 28 Ryunosuke Sato; 29 Makoto Kemna; 30 Kazuki Takita; 34 Kouya Takahashi; 35 Taiki Kudoh; 38 Seiya Akagi; 39 Ginji Hasebe; 45 Ryuya Matsumoto; 46 Hayato Takagi; 47 Yuta Saitoh; 48 Makoto Aduwa; 66 Atsushi Endoh; 67 Harun Kikuchi; 70 Atsumi Hidaka; Catchers: 40 Yoshitaka Isomura; 57 Taiki Mochimaru; 62 Kanato Shimizu; 64 Shoto Takagi	Infielders: 2 Kosuke Tanaka; 44 Kota Hayashi; 49 Yuto Watanabe; 54 Atsumi Nishikawa; 58 Yuto Nakata; 63 Shodai Uchida; 69 Kounosuke Tatsumi; 93 Seita Maekawa; 94 Yusuke Satoh; 99 Shoichi Futamata; Outfielders: 51 Ren Hirakawa; 56 Shu Kubo; 60 Shunsuke Tamura; 97 Takahiro Nakamura; Manager: 71 Shinji Koh; Coaches Outfield defense/Base running: 75 Jun Hirose; Infield defense/Base running: 72 Akihiro Higashide; Hitting: 84 Ryota Arai; Head/Hitting/Base running: 85 Kazuki Fukuchi; Pitching: 82 Ryuji Yokoyama; 87 Ken Takahashi; Battery: 76 Yoshikazu Kura; Third squad Supervisor: 78 Tatsumi Une; Development pitching strengthening: 73 Kanei Kobayashi; Position player: 91 Yuichiro Mukae; Development pitching/Analyst: 92 Yusuke Nomura
Development Players
120 Takeru Sugita (P); 121 Norihiko Nabara (OF); 122 Toshiki Yasutake (C); 123 Tsubasa Kobune (P); 124 Yuta Kobayashi (C); 126 Kaito Takeshita (P); 127 Kei Kawano (P); 128 Mirai Sugihara (P); 130 Moises Ramirez (IF); 131 Nelson Robert (OF)
Updated January 20, 2026		→ All NPB rosters

== Mascots and characters ==
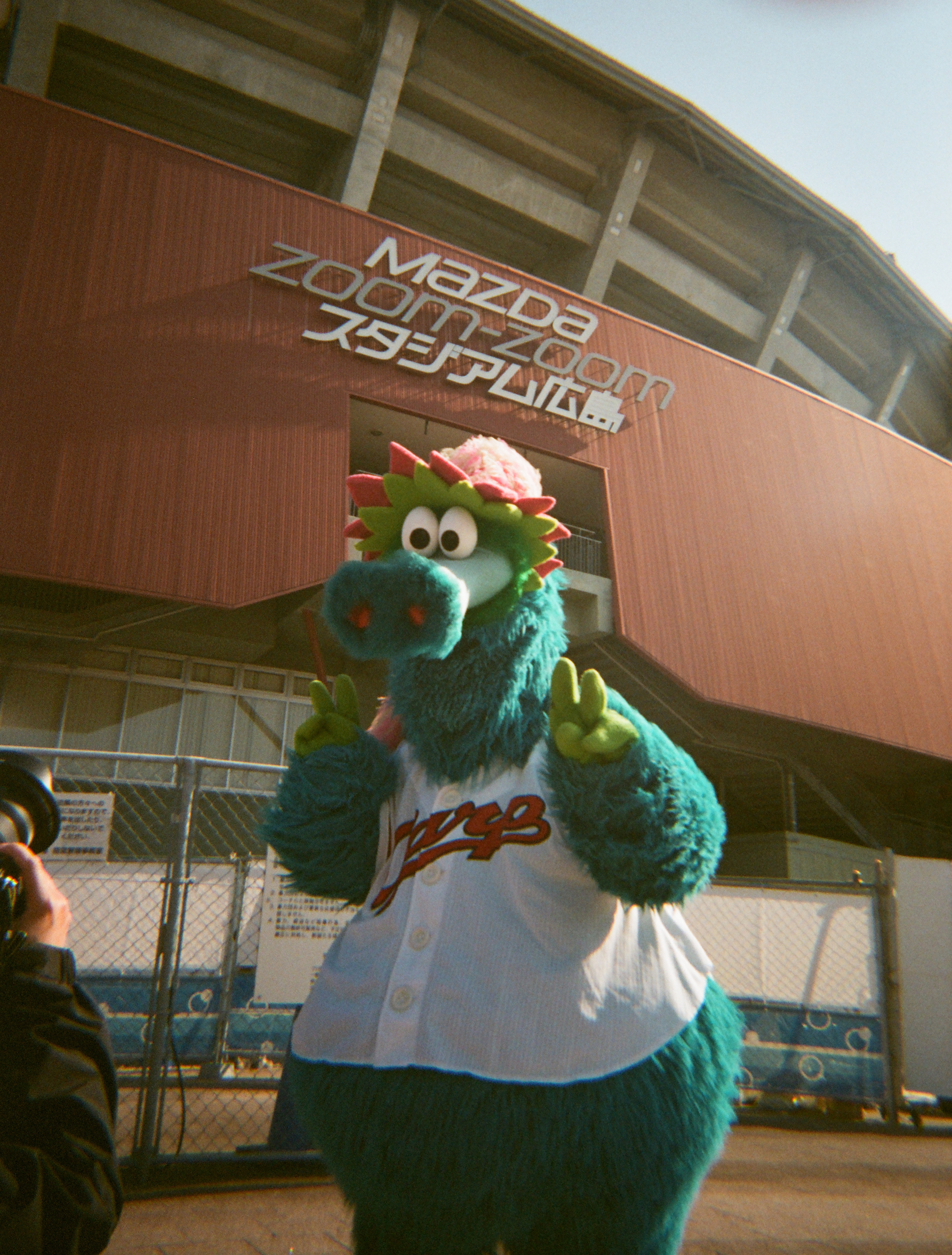
Slyly

- One of the team's two mascot's, "Carp Boy"(カープ坊や Kāpu Bōya), is seen in the team's logo. Their other mascot, "Slyly"(スラィリー Surairī), bears a resemblance to the Phillie Phanatic of the Philadelphia Phillies and has been with the team since 1995. Both Slyly and the Phillie Phanatic were designed by Harrison/Erickson which has also worked with Sesame Street and Jim Henson. The Slyly costume design was also previously used as Duncan the Dragon for the New Jersey Nets.
- The first Japanese baseball dog "Mickey"(ミッキー Mikkī) was employed between 2005 and 2007. Mickey was a Golden Retriever who wore jersey number 111, and brought new balls to the umpire from the dugout during the game. Mickey died in 2009 at the age of 11.
- Until 2015, Hiroshima Municipal Stadium was closed every year on August 6 in memorial of the atomic bombings of Hiroshima and Nagasaki. The team always played in other stadiums, even if a home game was scheduled for that day. The team played their first August 6 home game at Mazda Zoom Zoom Stadium in 2015. During the game all Carp players wore the uniform number 86 representing the date of the event 70 years prior, and PEACE on the front to symbolize the city's everlasting goal for world peace.

== Unique cheer ==
Hiroshima Toyo Carp Cheering Summary Site応援の流れ [広島カープの応援]

=== Squat cheering ===
Other teams usually repeat the lyrics of their anthems, but the Hiroshima Toyo Carp sings the lyrics once and then shouts the name of the person they are cheering for.

In the first round, they sing the lyrics, but in the second round, they call out their names. At this time, the team is divided into two groups for cheering. For example, if the player being cheered for is named "Kozono," one of them stands up and shouts “Kokomo" and then sits down. The other group performs in the same manner.

Repeat 3~5 sets again, but with a slight lengthening of the pronunciation.

This type of cheering is also used when the Hiroshima Toyo Carp players go to bat at world championships and other events, such as the All-Star Game. It is said that the reason why it is called "Squat Cheer" is because the cheering is done by repeatedly standing up and sitting down, and it is said to have taken root around 1993.

=== Three call ===
In Japanese baseball cheering, "three calls" are made before the cheering song during the attack.

A famous example is "Kattobase Kattobase ○○" repeated three times, followed by "Kattobase-○○.

(Kattobase means to hit the ball anyway.)

The "mo tte koi" call is "motte koi motte koi○○" repeated three times.

In the Carp After repeating the call, they shout "Motte Koi!

(The word "mottekoi" means "please hit a home run into the stands.)

The same goes for home run calls.

== Chance theme ==
In Japanese baseball, there is a unique cheering song called "Chance Theme," which is played mainly when the bases are loaded.

== Carp academies ==
The Carp was the first Japanese baseball team to establish a baseball academy outside Japan. The team was unable to recruit non-Japanese players from the major leagues due to financial constraints, and the academy was established to cheaply send young players to play in Japan. The Carp Baseball Academy was created in the Dominican Republic in 1990, and Robinson Checo became the first player imported to Japan from the academy in 1995. Checo achieved moderate success in Japan, leading to further imports which include later-MLB players Timo Pérez and Alfonso Soriano.

In 2004, the Carp started a pitching academy in Guangdong, China, in an attempt "to expand the range of baseball in Asia."

== Players of note ==
=== MLB players ===
Active:

- Seiya Suzuki (2022–present)
- Ryan Brasier (2013, 2018–present)
- Kenta Maeda (2016–2025)

Retired:

- Colby Lewis (2002–2004, 2006–2007, 2010–2012, 2014–2016)
- Hiroki Kuroda (2008–2014)
- Ken Takahashi (2009)
- Richie Scheinblum (1975–1976)
- Alfonso Soriano (1999–2014)

=== Retired numbers ===
Number	Player	Position	Tenure
3	(Japan) Sachio Kinugasa	3B	1965–1987 (Note: Kinugasa wore #28 from 1965 to 1974)
8	(Japan) Koji Yamamoto	CF; Manager	1969–1986; 1989–1993, 2001–2005
15	(Japan) Hiroki Kuroda	P	1997–2007, 2015–2016

=== Honored numbers ===
- 1 (Japan) Tomonori Maeda (1994–2013) – (Japan) Seiya Suzuki (2019–2021)
- 7 (Japan) Kenjiro Nomura (1989–2005) – (Japan) Shota Dobayashi (2013–present)
- 18 (Japan) Shinji Sasaoka (1990–2007) – (Japan) Kenta Maeda (2008–2015) – (Japan) Masato Morishita (2020–present）
- 20 (Japan) Manabu Kitabeppu (1976–1994) – (Japan) Katsuhiro Nagakawa (2003–2019) – (Japan) Ryoji Kuribayashi (2021–present）
- 25 (Japan) Takahiro Arai – (1999–2007, 2016–2018, 2023–present)

== Managers ==
Name	Nationality	Period
Shuichi Ishimoto	Japan	1950–1953
Katsumi Shiraishi	Japan	1953–1960, 1963–1965
Masato Monzen	Japan	1961–1962
Ryohei Hasegawa	Japan	1965–1967
Rikuo Nemoto	Japan	1968–1972
Katsuya Morinaga	Japan	1972, 1974–1975
Joe Lutz	United States	1975
Takeshi Koba	Japan	1975–1985
Junro Anan	Japan	1986–1988
Koji Yamamoto	Japan	1989–1993, 2001–2005
Toshiyuki Mimura	Japan	1994–1998
Mitsuo Tatsukawa	Japan	1999–2000
Marty Leo Brown	United States	2006–2009
Kenjiro Nomura	Japan	2010–2014
Koichi Ogata	Japan	2015–2019
Shinji Sasaoka	Japan	2020–2022
Takahiro Arai	Japan	2023–present

== Farm team ==
The team has a farm team in the lower Western League, also named Toyo Carp.

The team's ball park, Yuu Baseball Ground is located approximately 20 kilometres (12 mi) southwest of Iwakuni in Yū, Yamaguchi. Built in 1993, the facility has a large main (seating for 3500) playing field with right and left bleachers (no seating in centre field) and a smaller throwing field next to it.

The team has other similar academies in other parts of the world, most notably, one in the Dominican Republic, which developed MLB great Alfonso Soriano.

== Attendances ==
The home attendances of the Hiroshima Toyo Carp:

Season	Games	Total attendance	Average attendance
2025	72	2,041,638	28,356
