= Nippon Life Stadium =

Former baseball stadium in Japan

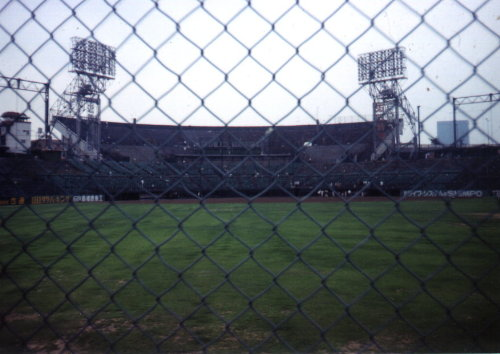
Nippon Life Stadium

Nippon Life Stadium, also called Nippon Seimei Stadium is a former baseball stadium in Japan. The Kintetsu Buffaloes of the Nippon League played there.
