= Hiroshima Municipal Stadium (1957) =

Stadium in Naka-ku, Hiroshima, Japan

Coordinates: 34°23′49.14″N 132°27′17.85″E

First Hiroshima Municipal Stadium
- Shodai-Shimin-Kyujo
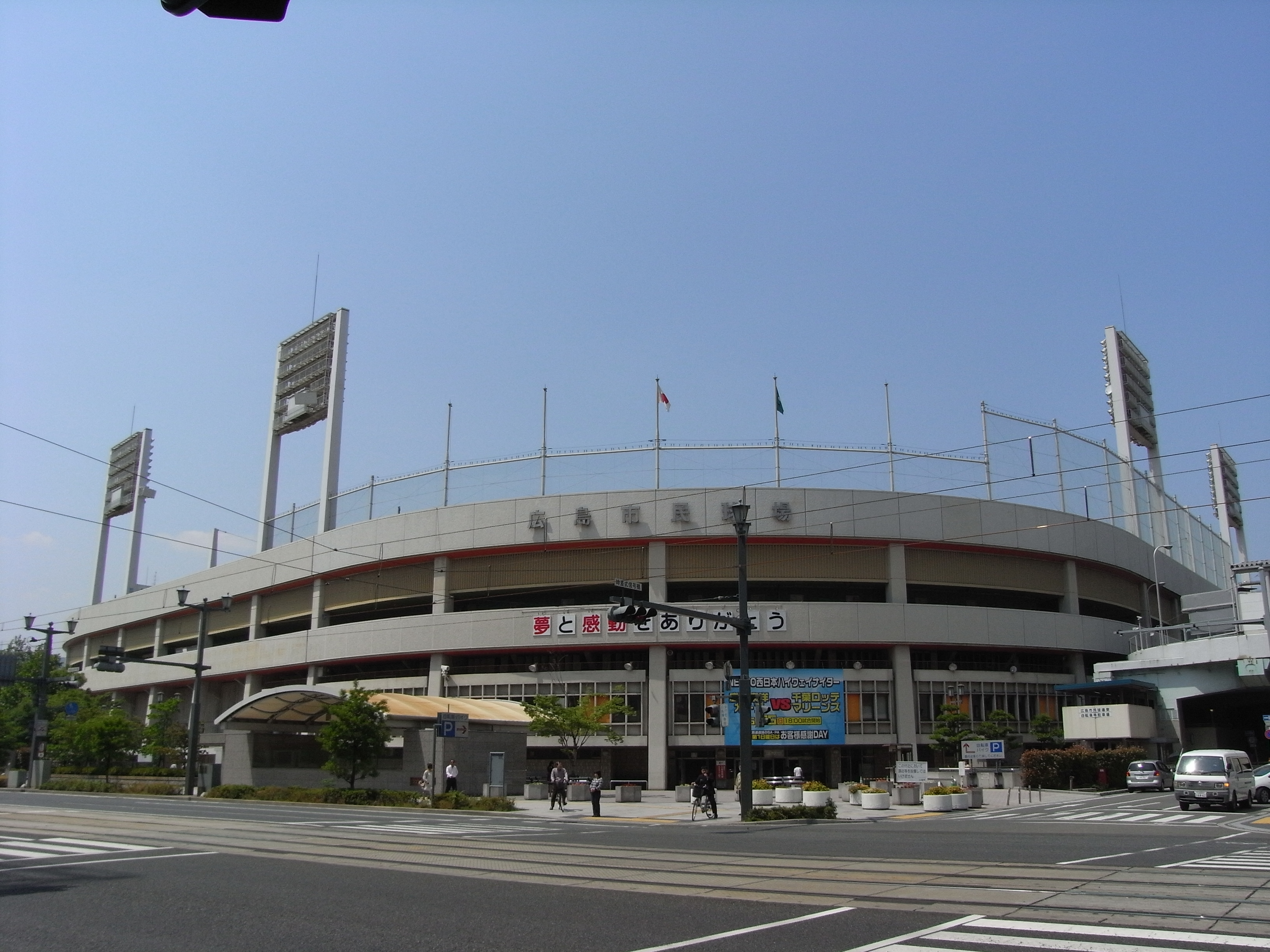
- Interactive map of First Hiroshima Municipal Stadium
- Location: 5-25, Moto-machi, Naka-ku, Hiroshima
- Owner: Hiroshima City
- Operator: Hiroshima City
- Capacity: 31,984
- Surface: Grass
- Field size: Left Field – 91.4 metres (300 ft); Left-Center – 109.7 metres (360 ft); Center Field – 115.8 metres (380 ft); Right-Center – 109.7 metres (360 ft); Right Field – 91.4 metres (300 ft)

Construction
- Groundbreaking: January 22, 1957
- Opened: July 20, 1957
- Closed: September 1, 2010
- Cost: 256 million Yen

Tenant
- Hiroshima Toyo Carp (NPB) (1957–2008)

First Hiroshima Municipal Stadium (初代広島市民球場, Shodai Hiroshima Shimin Kyūjō) was a stadium in Hiroshima, Japan. It was primarily used for baseball, and was the home field of the Hiroshima Toyo Carp. It opened in 1957 and held 31,984 people, standing in the central area of Hiroshima across from the Hiroshima Peace Memorial.

To replace the stadium, the new municipal stadium was completed in March 2009. The first stadium was renamed Former Hiroshima Municipal Stadium (旧広島市民球場, Kyū Hiroshima Shimin Kyūjō) on April 1, 2009, and was used for amateur baseball. The first municipal stadium was closed on September 1, 2010.

The stadium disuse bylaw was concluded by the Hiroshima municipal assembly in June 2010 and the stadium was slated for demolition. In October of the same year, stadium memorabilia was auctioned off and demolition started on November 29. The demolition was completed on February 28, 2012, leaving only a portion of the right field stands to be preserved for future generations.
