= List of Nippon Professional Baseball players (D) =

The following is a list of Nippon Professional Baseball players with the last name starting with D, retired or active.

== D ==
- Takenori Daita
- Masaaki Daitoh
- Yu Darvish
- Romash Tasuku Dass
- Masashi Date
- Jack Daugherty
- Tom Davey
- Dick Davis
- Glenn Davis
- Scott Ray Davison
- Fernando de la Cruz
- Francisco de la Cruz
- Luis de los Santos
- Yudai Deguchi
- Miguel Del Toro
- Tomás de la Rosa
- Shane Dennis
- Orestes Destrade
- Eddy Díaz
- Felix Diaz
- Joselo Díaz
- Rafael Díaz
- Joe Dillon
- Katsuyuki Dobashi
- Masayuki Dobashi
- Kenta Doi
- Kiyoshi Doi
- Masahiro Doi
- Ryotaro Doi
- Shozo Doi
- Yoshihiro Doi
- Chris Donnels
- Naomichi Donoue
- Takehiro Donoue
- David Doster
- Sean Douglass
- Travis Driskill
- Rob Ducey
- Mariano Duncan
