= Tsuguhiro Hattori =

Japanese baseball player (1920–1991)

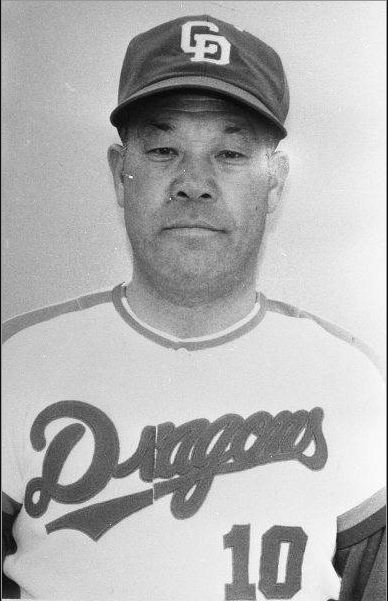
- Catcher, Pitcher, Third baseman, Outfielder
- Born: February 23, 1920; Aichi, Japan
- Died: December 6, 1991 (aged 71)
- Batted: Right Threw: Right

JBL debut
- 1939, for the Nagoya Club

Last NBP appearance
- 1958, for the Chunichi Dragons

NPB statistics
- Win–loss: 112–65
- ERA: 2.81
- Strikeouts: 540

NPB statistics
- Batting average: .239
- Home runs: 33
- RBI: 208

Teams
- As player: Nagoya Club (1939–1941); Chubu Nihon (1946); Chunichi Dragons (1947–1950); Nagoya Dragons (1951–1953); Chunichi Dragons (1954–1958); As coach: Chunichi Dragons (1955–1956,1958, 1977 )

Career highlights and awards
- 1954 Central League Champion; 1954 Japan Series Champion; 1× Home Run Champion (1941); Chunichi Dragons #10 retired

Tsuguhiro Hattori (服部 受弘; February 23, 1920 – December 6, 1991) was a prominent Japanese Nippon Professional Baseball player who excelled as a pitcher and was the first Chunichi Dragons pitcher to reach 100 wins. He played with the Dragons franchise his entire career. His number 10 jersey is one of only two retired by the team.

== Career ==
Hattori attended Nihon University. Hattori debuted with Nagoya at the age of 19 in 1939 firstly as a catcher and captured hearts and minds by becoming home run champion in his third year.

After the war, at the behest of his manager, Yoshikazu Takeuchi, he took up and found success as a pitcher. On his off days he would revert to being catcher due to a lack of players. After that year, he never had a season with less than 10 wins (except for 1951 and 1953) and in 1949 he put up 24 in 30 starts. In 1950, behind Dragons ace Shigeru Sugishita he put up another impressive season on the mound with a further 21 wins. From 1951, Hattori would move from behind the plate to take up third base duties along with his pitching.

Hattori finished his career in 1958 having played 258 matches, achieving 112 wins and 65 losses with an ERA of 2.85. He was the first player in Dragons history to reach 100 wins.

== Feats ==
On August 12, 1952, in a game against the Yomiuri Giants, Hattori would come in as a pinch-hitter hitting a grand slam against Giants ace Takehiko Bessho. Hattori would later approach the mound and close out the game as winning pitcher.

== After retirement ==
After retirement Hattori had moderate success as a coach and scout, as well as the occasional television appearance on Professional Baseball News. His number 10 was retired by the Dragons along with teammate Michio Nishizawa.

Hattori died at age 71 on December 6, 1991, due to heart failure.

== Style ==
Unable to throw a curveball, Hattori found the majority of his success with a cutter delivery.
