= Carlo Zendo Tetsugen Serra =

Italian Soto Zen master

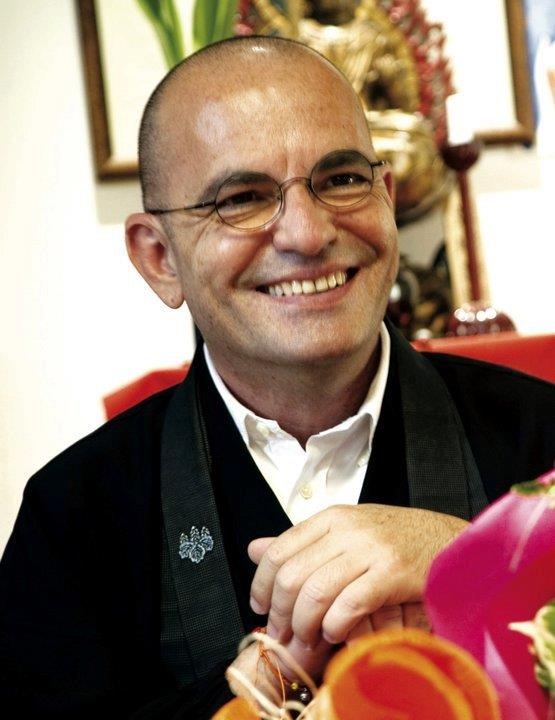
An image of the Italian zen master Zendo Tetsugen Serra

Carlo Zendo Tetsugen Serra (born in Milano, Italy in 1953) is an Italian missionary Soto Zen master (Kokusaifukyoshi 国際布教師), in the lineage of Harada Daiun Sogaku (原田祖岳, 1871–1961). He founded his sangha, of the "Sangha della foresta di Bambü" (Bamboo Forest's Sangha) and the monasteries Ensoji il Cerchio in Milan, and Sanbo-ji Tempio dei Tre Gioielli in Berceto. He also founded the "Scuola Zen di Shiatsu" (Zen Shiatsu School), which aims to use the art of shiatsu treatments as a zen practice. He is one of the Buddhist religious authorities in Europe, a signatory of the interreligious Italian "Manifesto della pace" (Peace Manifesto).

== Biography ==
After a short career in the world of photography and cinema, Carlo Serra arrived in Japan in 1983, and was ordained monk (出家 shukke), with the Dharma name (戒名, kaimyō) Tetsugen, at the Tosho-ji (東照寺) monkery of Tokyo. He became a disciple of the abbot Ban Tetsugyu Soin Roshi (伴鐵牛, 1910–1996).

During his training as a monk, he attended the Institute of eastern medicine founded by Shizuto Masunaga (増永静人 1925–1981), from which, in 1988, he got a certificate of teacher of eastern medicine and Zen Shiatsu. The composite background of a zen monk and shiatsu teacher opened to Tetsugen his intention to use the shiatsu discipline as zen practice, that will become one of the particularities of his work in Italy.

After five years of training in Toshoji, Tetsugen was sent as a Buddhist missionary in Italy, and in 1988 founded the first monastery in Milan, Enso-ji il Cerchio. In 1992 also founded the Shiatsu Zen school ("Scuola Zen di Shiatsu"). In 1995 he followed the beginning, even in Enso-ji, of the offering of shiatsu massage, which permitted monks and shiatsu teachers to use and improve the abilities apprehended in the training, making a job of that.

A year later a second monastery is founded, the Sanbo-ji, tempio dei tre Gioielli (temple of three jewels) nearby Berceto, Parma. Initially used as a location for zen retreats and shiatsu seminaries, in the last years Sanbo-ji became the seat of a monastic "Sangha", that opened to the lay people also to practise a monk's daily life for a short time.

In 1998 the zen master Tetsujyo Deguchi (出口鐵城, 1951), dharma heir of Ban Tetsugyu Soin (伴鐵牛, 1910–1996) and current abbot of Sanbo-ji certificates to Tetsugen the Dharma transmission of his lineage, recognizing him as missionary zen master (Kokusaifukyoshi 国際布教師) with the name of Zendo. The confirmation of this title accompanied the acknowledgement of Tetsugen as an independent master by the international association "Sōtōshū shumucho" (曹洞宗宗務庁), to which belong many of the Soto temples and monasteries in Japan and in the World. Between 2000 and 2003, Tetsugen covered the seat of a member of the direction of UBI (Italian Buddhist Union).

The first years of the 21st Century saw a gradual evolution of the approach of Tetsugen's doctrine, which began to put the basis for a new development of zen teaching and practising that could transfer the meanings of Buddhist and zen tradition following the demands and the languages of the western society. The Italian zen master tested also an approach to the management of the zen discipline of koan solving creating in 2003 the society "ZenEssere" (ZenBeing), deepening a theoretical path that took him to publish, for the publishing house Guerini Management by Zen Koan, in which he develops an application of Zen teaching to management.

The work of Tetsugen Serra spreads itself also to experimentations that make Zen teaching and cognitive psychology a lay path of self-improvement with the offering of counselling sessions, helping to solve daily problems about the attitude to life. In 2012 Tetsugen finished perfecting the path of consciousness development named MindfulZen, which through sessions of meetings, seminars and appropriate essays achieved the Italian master's intention to build a path to mindfulness from zen teachings in a lay contemporary way.

== Bibliography ==
In Italian

- Carlo Tetsugen Serra, Zen 3.0. La via della meditazione. Milano, Cairo, 2015.
- Carlo Tetsugen Serra, Zen 2.0. La via della felicità. Milano, Cairo, 2014.
- Stefano Verza, Carlo Tetsugen Serra, Management by Zen Koan, Guerini, 2009.
- Carlo Tetsugen Serra, Zen Shiatsu. Per sé, per la coppia, per gli amici e la famiglia Milano, Fabbri Editori, 2005
- Carlo Tetsugen Serra, Zen. Milano, Fabbri Editori, 2005.
- Carlo Tetsugen Serra, La Terapia Zen, Como, Xenia, 1998
- Carlo Tetsugen Serra, Vivere zen. Como, Xenia, 1998.

In Spanish

- Carlo Tetsugen Serra Zen Shiatsu para uno mismo Tutor, 2013
