= Kohei Oda =

Kohei Oda may refer to:

- Kohei Oda (baseball), Japanese baseball catcher
- Kohei Oda (scientist), Japanese microbiologist
