= Kōki Saitō (baseball) =

Japanese baseball player (born 1996)

Kōki Saitō 齋藤 綱記
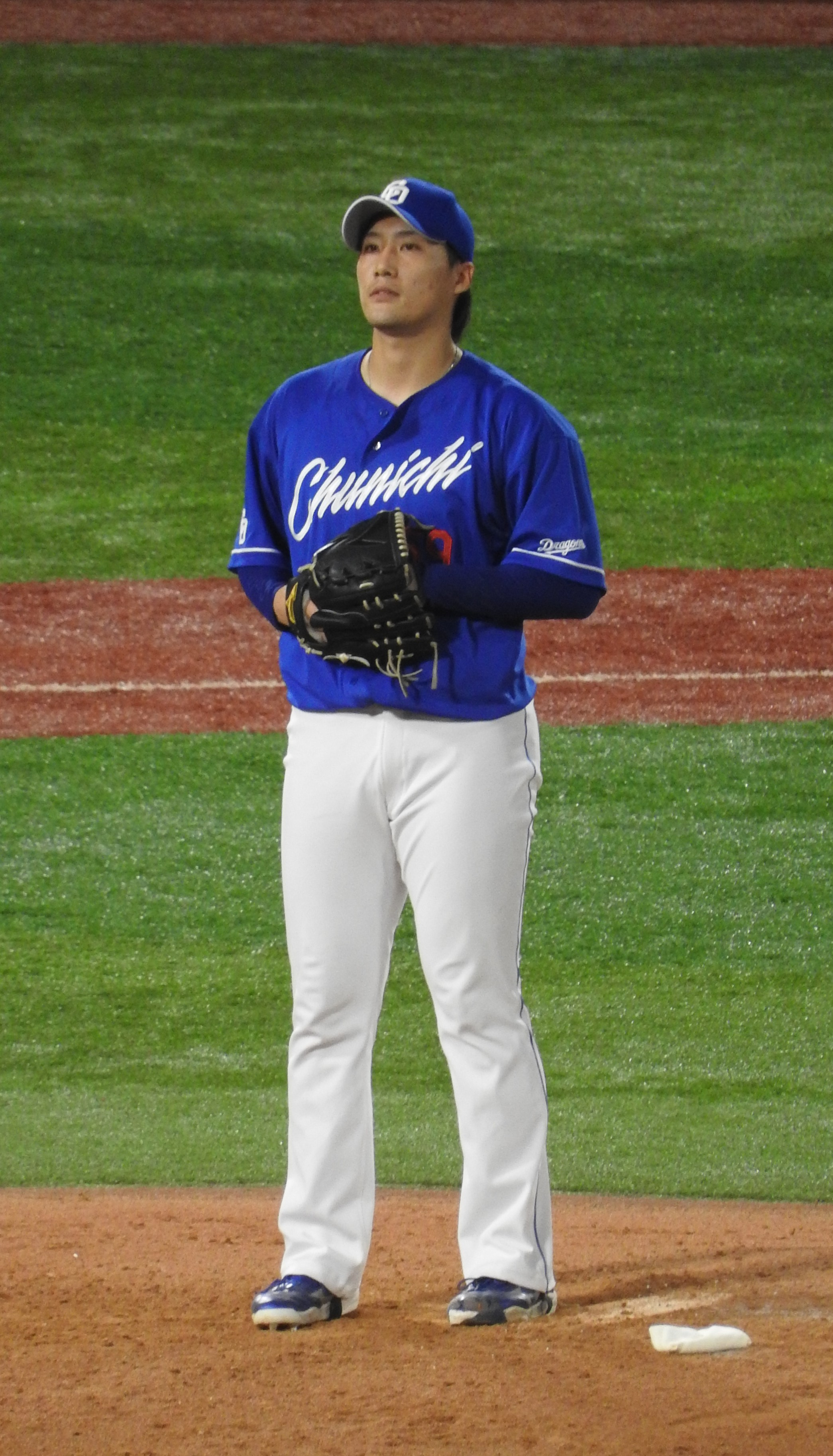

Chunichi Dragons – No. 59
- Pitcher
- Born: December 18, 1996 (age 29); Kita-ku, Sapporo, Hokkaido, Japan
- Bats: Left Throws: Left

NPB debut
- 18 September, 2016, for the Chunichi Dragons

NPB statistics (through July 22, 2026)
- Win–loss record: 14–7
- Earned run average: 3.33
- Strikeouts: 179

Teams
- Orix Buffaloes (2016–2022); Hokkaido Nippon-Ham Fighters (2023); Chunichi Dragons (2023–present)

Kōki Saitō (齋藤 綱記, Saitō Kōki; born December 18, 1996) is a professional Japanese baseball player. He plays pitcher for the Chunichi Dragons. He previously played for the Orix Buffaloes and the Hokkaido Nippon-Ham Fighters.

== Professional career ==
Starting his career at the Orix Buffaloes, Saitō was traded to the Hokkaido Nippon-Ham Fighters for catcher, Ryō Ishikawa of the Orix Buffaloes. Less than a year later, Saitō would be involved in a trade alongside Shingo Usami for Yūya Gunji and Takumi Yamamoto of the Chunichi Dragons.

== Pitching style ==
Saitō's fastball tops out at 144 km/h. His normal pitch mix includes a vertical and horizontal moving slider, a curveball, a changeup and a splitter. In 2017, he switched to a side-throwing action with the addition of fellow lefty, Daiki Tajima in the first round of the draft, adding more spin to his slider and improving hitting his spots inside. On being traded to the Dragons, under the tutelage of Akinori Otsuka, Saito switched to a three-quarter delivery increasing his velocity and whiff rate with his slider.
