= 1954 Japan Series =

Team (Wins)	Managers	Season
Chunichi Dragons (4)	Shunichi Amachi	86–40–4 (.683), 5½ GA
Nishitetsu Lions (3)	Osamu Mihara	90–47–3 (.657), ½ GA
- Dates: October 30 – November 7
- MVP: Shigeru Sugishita (Chunichi)
- FSA: Hiroshi Oshita (Nishitetsu)

The 1954 Japan Series was the championship series of Nippon Professional Baseball (NPB) for the 1954 season. The fifth edition of the Series, it was a best-of-seven playoff that matched the Pacific League champion Nishitetsu Lions against the Central League champion Chunichi Dragons. It was the first Japan Series appearance for both teams. The Dragons won in seven games for their first championship; they would not win another one until 2007 while the Lions would return to the Series two years later.

== Summary ==
CL Chunichi Dragons (4) vs. PL Nishitetsu Lions (3)

Game	Date	Score	Location	Time	Attendance
1	October 30	Nishitetsu Lions – 1, Chunichi Dragons – 5	Nagoya Baseball Stadium	2:15	29,245
2	October 31	Nishitetsu Lions – 0, Chunichi Dragons – 5	Nagoya Baseball Stadium	2:21	30,303
3	November 2	Chunichi Dragons – 0, Nishitetsu Lions – 5	Heiwadai Stadium	2:19	23,994
4	November 3	Chunichi Dragons – 0, Nishitetsu Lions – 3	Heiwadai Stadium	1:36	25,185
5	November 4	Chunichi Dragons – 3, Nishitetsu Lions – 2	Heiwadai Stadium	2:15	19,771
6	November 6	Nishitetsu Lions – 4, Chunichi Dragons – 1	Nagoya Baseball Stadium	2:16	27,776
7	November 7	Nishitetsu Lions – 0, Chunichi Dragons – 1	Nagoya Baseball Stadium	1:38	23,215

== Matchups ==
=== Game 1 ===
Saturday, October 30, 1954 – 1:34 pm at Nagoya Baseball Stadium in Nagoya, Aichi Prefecture

Team	1	2	3	4	5	6	7	8	9	R	H	E
Nishitetsu	0	0	1	0	0	0	0	0	0	1	4	0
Chunichi	1	0	0	0	0	0	0	4	X	5	11	0
WP: Shigeru Sugishita (1–0) LP: Sadao Nishimura (0–1); Home runs: NIS: Takeshi Hibino (1); CHU: Riichi Kodama (1)

=== Game 2 ===
Sunday, October 31, 1954 – 1:34 pm at Nagoya Baseball Stadium in Nagoya, Aichi Prefecture

Team	1	2	3	4	5	6	7	8	9	R	H	E
Nishitetsu	0	0	0	0	0	0	0	0	0	0	6	3
Chunichi	0	0	0	0	2	3	0	0	X	5	7	0
WP: Katsuhiko Ishikawa (1–0) LP: Mamoru Ōtsu (0–1); Home runs: NIS: None; CHU: Michio Nishizawa (1)

=== Game 3 ===
Tuesday, November 2, 1954 – 1:36 pm at Heiwadai Stadium in Fukuoka, Fukuoka Prefecture

Team	1	2	3	4	5	6	7	8	9	R	H	E
Chunichi	0	0	0	0	0	0	0	0	0	0	2	2
Nishitetsu	1	0	0	1	0	0	0	3	X	5	11	0
WP: Hidefumi Kawamura (1–0) LP: Nobuo Ōshima (0–1); Home runs: CHU: None; NIS: Takeshi Hibino (2)

=== Game 4 ===
Wednesday, November 3, 1954 – 1:35 pm at Heiwadai Stadium in Fukuoka, Fukuoka Prefecture

Team	1	2	3	4	5	6	7	8	9	R	H	E
Chunichi	0	0	0	0	0	0	0	0	0	0	3	1
Nishitetsu	0	0	0	2	0	0	1	0	X	3	11	0
WP: Tokuji Kawasaki (1–0) LP: Shigeru Sugishita (1–1)

=== Game 5 ===
Thursday, November 4, 1954 – 1:32 pm at Heiwadai Stadium in Fukuoka, Fukuoka Prefecture

Team	1	2	3	4	5	6	7	8	9	R	H	E
Chunichi	1	0	0	0	0	0	0	1	1	3	8	1
Nishitetsu	0	1	0	0	0	0	0	0	1	2	7	2
WP: Shigeru Sugishita (2–1) LP: Hidefumi Kawamura (1–1); Home runs: CHU: None; NIS: Takeshi Hibino (3)

=== Game 6 ===
Saturday, November 6, 1954 – 1:33 pm at Nagoya Baseball Stadium in Nagoya, Aichi Prefecture

Team	1	2	3	4	5	6	7	8	9	R	H	E
Nishitetsu	0	0	0	0	0	3	1	0	0	4	8	2
Chunichi	0	0	1	0	0	0	0	0	0	1	6	1
WP: Mamoru Ōtsu (1–1) LP: Katsuhiko Ishikawa (1–1)

=== Game 7 ===
Sunday, November 7, 1954 – 1:32 pm at Nagoya Baseball Stadium in Nagoya, Aichi Prefecture

Team	1	2	3	4	5	6	7	8	9	R	H	E
Nishitetsu	0	0	0	0	0	0	0	0	0	0	3	1
Chunichi	0	0	0	0	0	0	1	0	X	1	6	0
WP: Shigeru Sugishita (3–1) LP: Hidefumi Kawamura (1–2)

== See also ==
- 1954 World Series
