= 1954 Nippon Professional Baseball season =

1954 NPB season
- League: Nippon Professional Baseball
- Sport: Baseball

Central League pennant
- League champions: Chunichi Dragons
- Runners-up: Yomiuri Giants
- Season MVP: Shigeru Sugishita (CHU)

Pacific League pennant
- League champions: Nishitetsu Lions
- Runners-up: Nankai Hawks
- Season MVP: Hiroshi Oshita (NIS)

Japan Series
- Champions: Chunichi Dragons
- Runners-up: Nishitetsu Lions
- Finals MVP: Shigeru Sugishita (CHU)

NPB seasons
- ← 1953 1955 →

The 1954 Nippon Professional Baseball season was the fifth season of operation of Nippon Professional Baseball (NPB).

== Regular season ==
=== Standings ===
Central League regular season standings
Team	G	W	L	T	Pct.	GB
Chunichi Dragons	130	86	40	4	.683	—
Yomiuri Giants	130	82	47	1	.636	5.5
Osaka Tigers	130	71	57	2	.555	16.0
Hiroshima Carp	130	56	69	5	.448	29.5
Kokutetsu Swallows	130	55	73	2	.430	32.0
Yosho Robins	130	32	96	2	.250	55.0

Pacific League regular season standings
Team	G	W	L	T	Pct.	GB
Nishitetsu Lions	140	90	47	3	.657	—
Nankai Hawks	140	91	49	0	.650	0.5
Mainichi Orions	140	79	57	4	.581	10.5
Kintetsu Pearls	140	74	63	3	.540	16.0
Hankyu Braves	140	66	70	4	.485	23.5
Takahashi Unions	140	53	84	3	.387	37.0
Toei Flyers	140	52	86	2	.377	38.5
Daiei Stars	140	43	92	5	.319	46.0

== Postseason ==
=== Japan Series ===
CL Chunichi Dragons (4) vs. PL Nishitetsu Lions (3)

Game	Date	Score	Location	Time	Attendance
1	October 30	Nishitetsu Lions – 1, Chunichi Dragons – 5	Nagoya Baseball Stadium	2:15	29,245
2	October 31	Nishitetsu Lions – 0, Chunichi Dragons – 5	Nagoya Baseball Stadium	2:21	30,303
3	November 2	Chunichi Dragons – 0, Nishitetsu Lions – 5	Heiwadai Stadium	2:19	23,994
4	November 3	Chunichi Dragons – 0, Nishitetsu Lions – 3	Heiwadai Stadium	1:36	25,185
5	November 4	Chunichi Dragons – 3, Nishitetsu Lions – 2	Heiwadai Stadium	2:15	19,771
6	November 6	Nishitetsu Lions – 4, Chunichi Dragons – 1	Nagoya Baseball Stadium	2:16	27,776
7	November 7	Nishitetsu Lions – 0, Chunichi Dragons – 1	Nagoya Baseball Stadium	1:38	23,215

== League leaders ==
=== Central League ===
Batting leaders
Stat	Player	Team	Total
Batting average	Wally Yonamine	Yomiuri Giants	.361
Home runs	Noboru Aota	Yosho Robins	31
Runs batted in	Niroyuki Watanabe; Satoshi Sugiyama	Osaka Tigers; Chunichi Dragons	91
Runs	Wally Yonamine	Yomiuri Giants	93
Hits	Wally Yonamine	Yomiuri Giants	172
Stolen bases	Yoshio Yoshida	Osaka Tigers	51

Pitching leaders
Stat	Player	Team	Total
Wins	Shigeru Sugishita	Chunichi Dragons	32
Losses	Masaichi Kaneda	Kokutetsu Swallows	23
Earned run average	Shigeru Sugishita	Chunichi Dragons	1.39
Strikeouts	Shigeru Sugishita	Chunichi Dragons	273
Innings pitched	Shigeru Sugishita	Chunichi Dragons	395 1/3

=== Pacific League ===
Batting leaders
Stat	Player	Team	Total
Batting average	Larry Raines	Hankyu Braves	.337
Home runs	Futoshi Nakanishi	Nishitetsu Lions	31
Runs batted in	Kazuhiro Yamauchi	Mainichi Orions	97
Runs	Larry Raines	Hankyu Braves	96
Hits	Larry Raines	Hankyu Braves	184
Stolen bases	Takeshi Suzuki	Kintetsu Pearls	71

Pitching leaders
Stat	Player	Team	Total
Wins	Motoji Takuwa; Fumio Tanaka	Nankai Hawks; Kintetsu Pearls	26
Losses	Takeshi Nomura	Takahashi Unions	23
Earned run average	Motoji Takuwa	Nankai Hawks	1.58
Strikeouts	Motoji Takuwa	Nankai Hawks	275
Innings pitched	Motoji Takuwa	Nankai Hawks	329 2/3

== Awards ==
- Most Valuable Player
  - Shigeru Sugishita, Chunichi Dragons (CL)
  - Hiroshi Oshita, Nishitetsu Lions (PL)
- Rookie of the Year
  - Tatsuro Hirooka, Yomiuri Giants (CL)
  - Motoji Takuwa, Nankai Hawks (PL)
- Eiji Sawamura Award
  - Shigeru Sugishita, Chunichi Dragons (CL)

Central League Best Nine Award winners
Position	Player	Team
Pitcher	Shigeru Sugishita	Chunichi Dragons
Catcher	Jun Hirota	Yomiuri Giants
First baseman	Michio Nishizawa	Chunichi Dragons
Second baseman	Hiroshi Hakoda	Kokutetsu Swallows
Third baseman	Mitsuo Uno	Kokutetsu Swallows
Shortstop	Tatsuro Hirooka	Yomiuri Giants
Outfielder	Hiroyuki Watanabe	Osaka Tigers
Outfielder	Wally Yonamine	Yomiuri Giants
Outfielder	Satoshi Sugiyama	Chunichi Dragons

Pacific League Best Nine Award winners
Position	Player	Team
Pitcher	Sadaaki Nishimura	Nishitetsu Lions
Catcher	Charlie Lewis	Mainichi Orions
First baseman	Kozo Kawai	Hankyu Braves
Second baseman	Masao Morishita	Nankai Hawks
Third baseman	Futoshi Nakanishi	Nishitetsu Lions
Shortstop	Larry Raines	Hankyu Braves
Outfielder	Kazuhiro Yamauchi	Mainichi Orions
Outfielder	Seiji Sekiguchi	Nishitetsu Lions
Outfielder	Hiroshi Oshita	Nishitetsu Lions

== See also ==
- 1954 All-American Girls Professional Baseball League season
- 1954 Major League Baseball season
