= Nobumasa =

- Gender: Male

Origin
- Origin: Japanese
- Meaning: Different meanings depending on the kanji used

Nobumasa (written: 信昌, 信正, 信政 or 永将) is a masculine Japanese given name. Notable people with the name include:

- Andō Nobumasa (安藤 信正; 1819–1871), Japanese daimyō
- Nobumasa Fukuda (福田 永将; born 1988), Japanese baseball player
- Okudaira Nobumasa (奥平 信昌; 1555–1615), Japanese daimyō
- Nobumasa Suetsugu (末次 信正; 1880–1944), Imperial Japanese Navy admiral
- Tsugaru Nobumasa (津軽 信政; 1646–1710), Japanese daimyō
