= Koki Saito =

Koki Saito may refer to:

- Koki Saito (equestrian) (born 1989), Japanese show jumping competitor
- Kōki Saitō (baseball) (born 1996), Japanese baseball player
- Kōki Saitō (footballer) (born 2001), Japanese football midfielder
