= Umeno =

Umeno (梅野, Umeno) is a Japanese surname. Notable people with the surname include:

- Genji Umeno (born 1988), Japanese martial artist
- Ryutaro Umeno (born 1991), Japanese baseball player
- Masamitsu Umeno (born 1993), Japanese sumo wrestler
- Yūgo Umeno (born 1999), Japanese baseball player
