= Takenori =

- Gender: Male

Origin
- Origin: Japanese
- Meaning: Different meanings depending on the kanji used

Takenori (written: 丈統, 武法, 武則, 豪則, 建紀, 雄伯 or 全登) is a masculine Japanese given name. Notable people with the name include:

- Akashi Takenori (明石 全登), Japanese samurai
- Takenori Daita (代田 建紀; born 1974), Japanese baseball player
- Takenori Hayashi (林 丈統; born 1980), Japanese footballer
- Takenori Hiraishi (born 1960), Japanese golfer
- Takenori Ito, Japanese mixed martial artist
- Takenori Kanzaki (神崎 武法; born 1943), Japanese politician
- Kasuya Takenori (糟屋 武則; 1562–1607), Japanese samurai
- Takenori Nemoto (根本 雄伯; born 1969), Japanese French horn player, classical composer, conductor and music educator
- Takenori Sato (佐藤 豪則; born 1985), Japanese mixed martial artist
