= Wataru Takamatsu =

Japanese baseball player (born 1999)

Wataru Takamatsu 高松渡
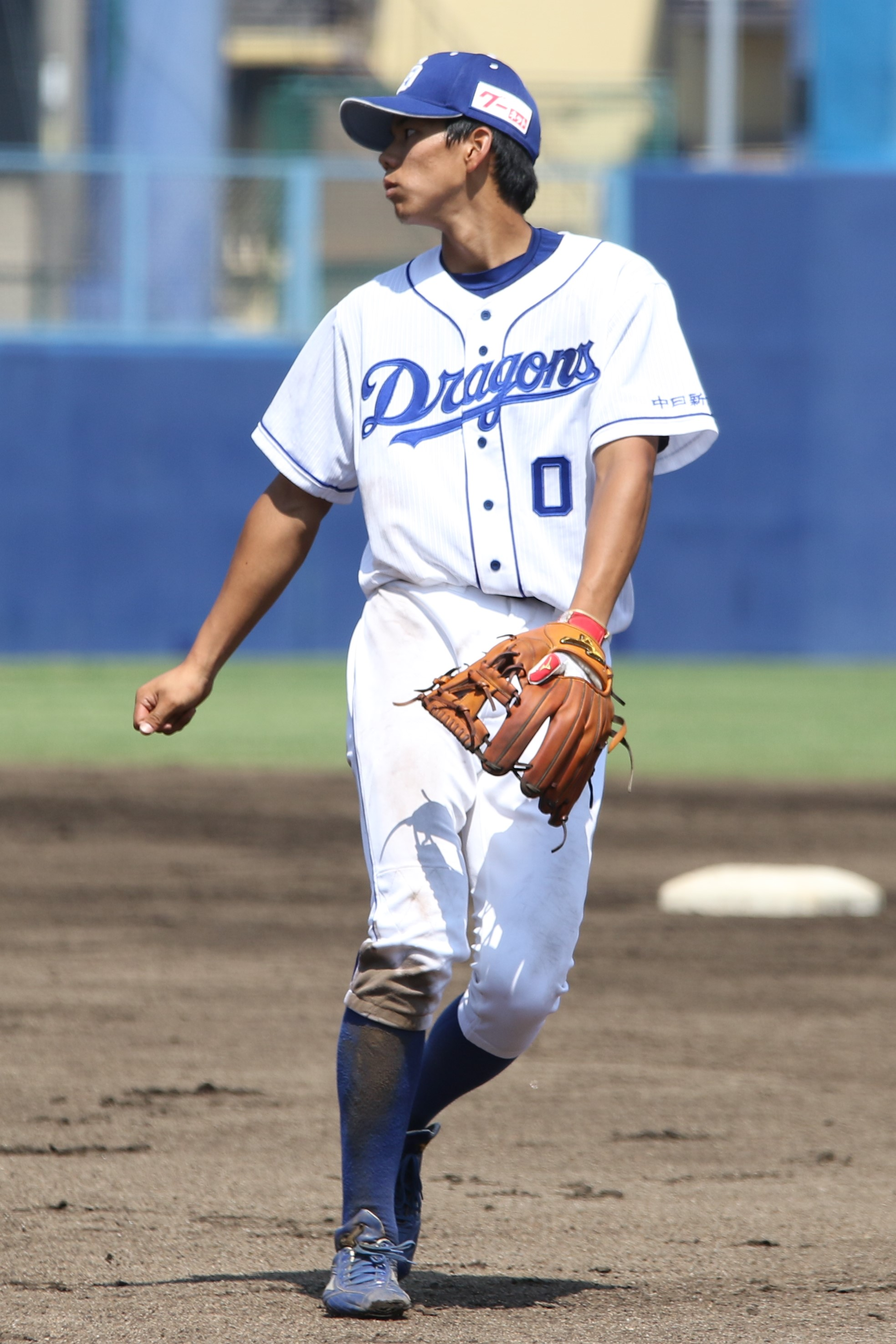

Saitama Seibu Lions – No. 50
- Infielder
- Born: July 2, 1999 (age 26); Kakogawa, Hyogo, Japan
- Bats: Left Throws: Right

NPB debut
- September 29, 2019, for the Chunichi Dragons

NPB statistics (through 2021)
- Batting average: .250
- Hits: 28
- Stolen bases: 15

Teams
- Chunichi Dragons (2018–2023); Saitama Seibu Lions (2023–present)

Wataru Takamatsu (高松渡, Takamatsu Wataru; born July 2, 1999 in Kakogawa, Hyogo, Japan) is a Japanese professional baseball infielder for the Saitama Seibu Lions of Nippon Professional Baseball (NPB). He has previously played in NPB for the Chunichi Dragons.

== Career ==
=== Chunichi Dragons ===
On October 20, 2017, Takamatsu was selected as the 3rd draft pick for the Chunichi Dragons at the 2017 NPB Draft and on November 15, signed a provisional contract with a ¥50,000,000 sign-on bonus and a ¥6,000,000 yearly salary.

=== Saitama Seibu Lions ===
On July 18, 2023, Takamatsu was traded to the Saitama Seibu Lions in exchange for Seiji Kawagoe.

== Personal life ==
Takamatsu is said to see Hanshin Tigers outfielder Yoshio Itoi as his benchmark for success.
