= 出口 =

出口, meaning "exit" or "export", may refer to:

- Deguchi, Japanese surname
- "Exit", a track in the same name of album by Taiwanese band Fahrenheit

== See also ==
- The dictionary definition of 出 at Wiktionary
- The dictionary definition of 口 at Wiktionary
- Exit (disambiguation)
