= Ensoji il Cerchio =

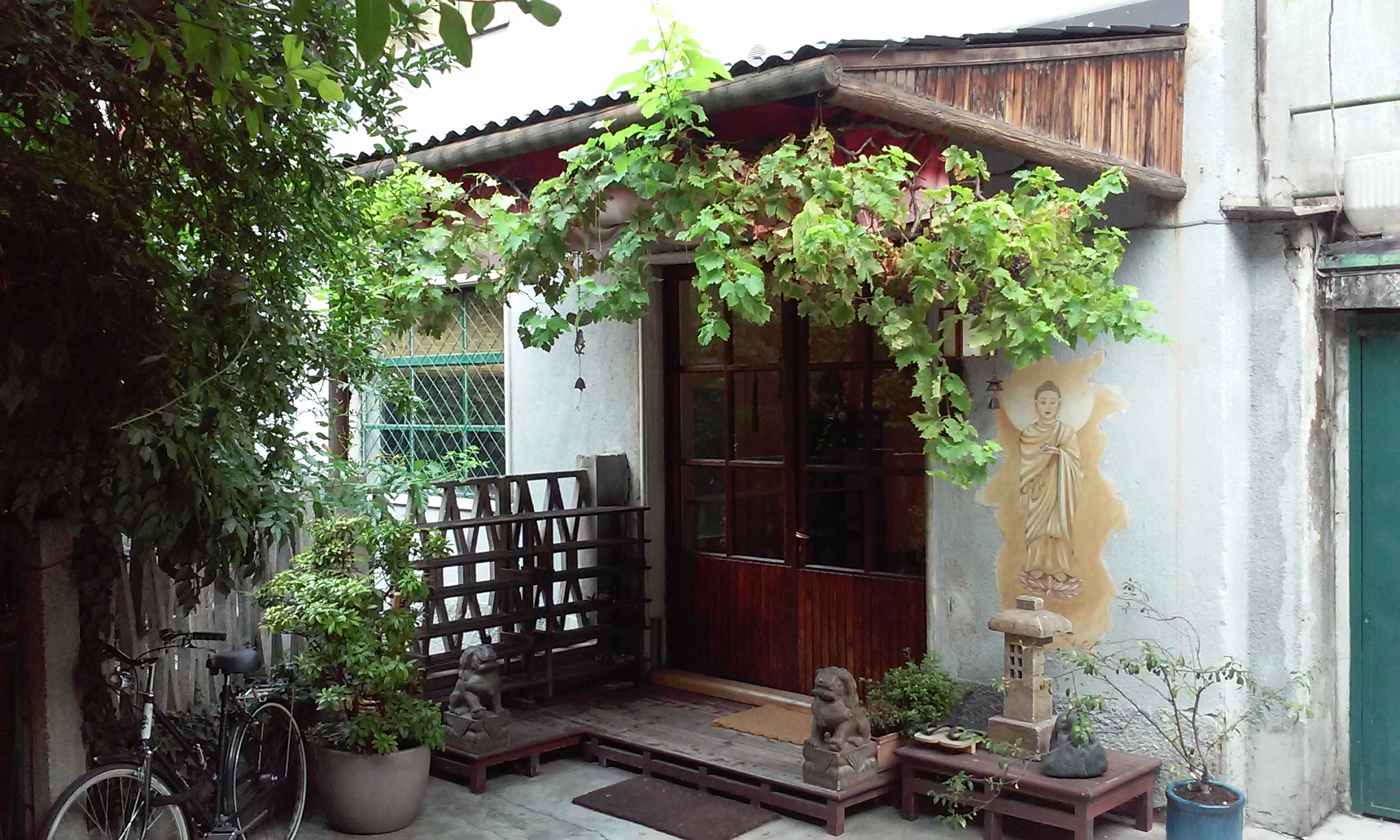
Entrance of Enso-ji, Milan

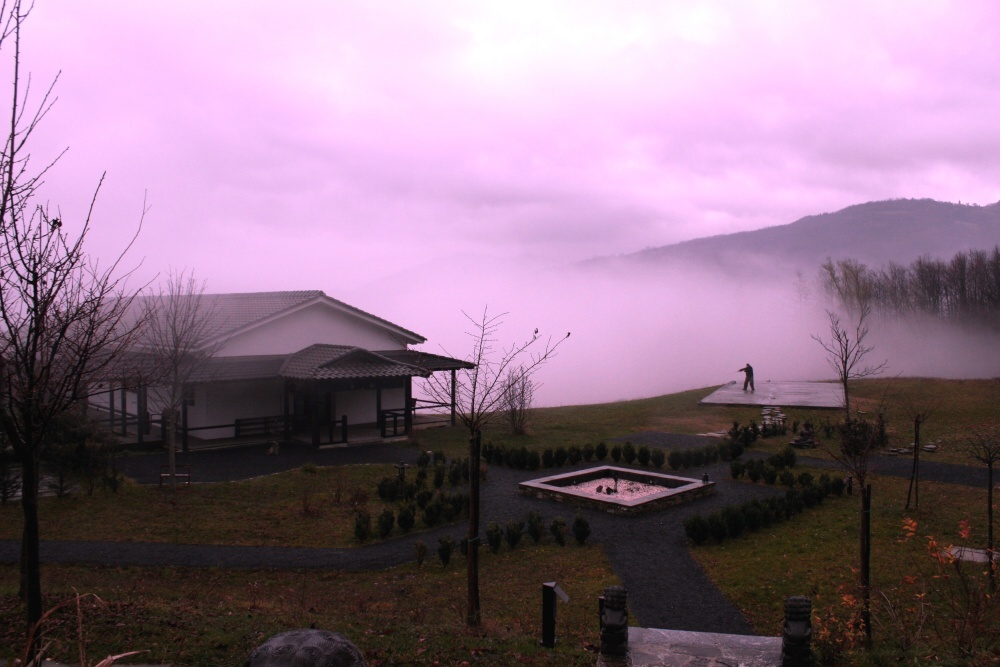
The zendo of Sanboji, Berceto, Parma

The zen monastery Enso-ji Il Cerchio (Japanese: 円相寺, Ensō-ji; eng.: "Temple of the Circle") is a Buddhist community and a cultural association recognised by the Italian Government. It is affiliated with Soto Zen Buddhism and was founded by the Italian Zen Master Carlo Zendo Tetsugen Serra (1953-), He was disciple of the Japanese Zen Master Ban Tetsugyu Soin (伴鐵牛, 1910-1996), between the late 1980s and the early 1990s. Later, he would be recognised as Zen Master in his lineage by his direct heir, the current abbot of Tosho-ji (東照寺), Tetsujyo Deguchi.

"Il Cerchio Enso-ji" is also member of the Italian Buddhist Union (UBI), that collects in a federation the principal buddhist centers in Italy and of European Buddhist Union (EBU).

"Il Cerchio" is a creation of the Sangha della Foresta di Bambù (literally: Sangha of the bamboo forest) and, inside a Zen Soto lineage, follows the teachings of Harada Daiun Sogaku (原田祖岳, 1871-1961).

The school of Harada Daiun Sogaku distinguishes itself from the usual Soto traditional methods, based exclusively on the practice of sitting meditation, zazen (坐禅) known as shikantaza (只管打坐, "simply sitting"). The peculiarity of the School of Daiun Sogaku was the adoptation of frequent and intense use of kōans, questions or paradoxical sentences with the purpose to let go a severe rational approach to the practice, helping practitioners to obtain the kensho. Koans are still peculiar today of Rinzai and Obaku traditions.

The sangha of Il Cerchio is located in two places: the Monastery "Ensoji – il Cerchio", founded in Milan, in 1988, and the Monastery "Sanbo-ji – Tempio dei Tre Gioielli," (三寶寺), founded 1996 nearly Berceto, Parma.

== Bibliography ==
- Massimo Introvigne, Enciclopedia delle religioni in Italia. Torino, Elledici, 2001, p. 571.
- Philippe Kapleau, I tre pilastri dello zen, Roma, Ubaldini, 1981.
- Carlo Tetsugen Serra, Zen 2.0, la via della felicità. Milano, Cairo Editore, 2014.
