= Deguchi =

Deguchi (written 出口 lit. "exit") is a Japanese surname. Notable people with the surname include:

- Aki Deguchi (出口 陽; born 1988), Japanese singer and idol
- Christa Deguchi (出口 クリスタ, born 1995) is a Canadian judoka.
- Eitaro Deguchi (出口 栄太郎; born 1948), Japanese golfer
- Kazuya Deguchi (出口 一也; born 1966), Japanese sport wrestler
- Mami Deguchi (出口 茉美; born 1985), Japanese voice actress
- Nao Deguchi (出口 なお; 1837–1918), Japanese religious leader and founder of Oomoto
- Natsuki Deguchi (出口夏希; born 2001), Japanese model and actress
- Onisaburo Deguchi (出口 王仁三郎; 1871–1948), Japanese religious leader
- Tetsujyo Deguchi (born 1950), Japanese Zen Buddhist
- Yudai Deguchi (出口 雄大; born 1971), Japanese baseball player
