= Seiji Kawagoe =

Japanese baseball player (born 1993)

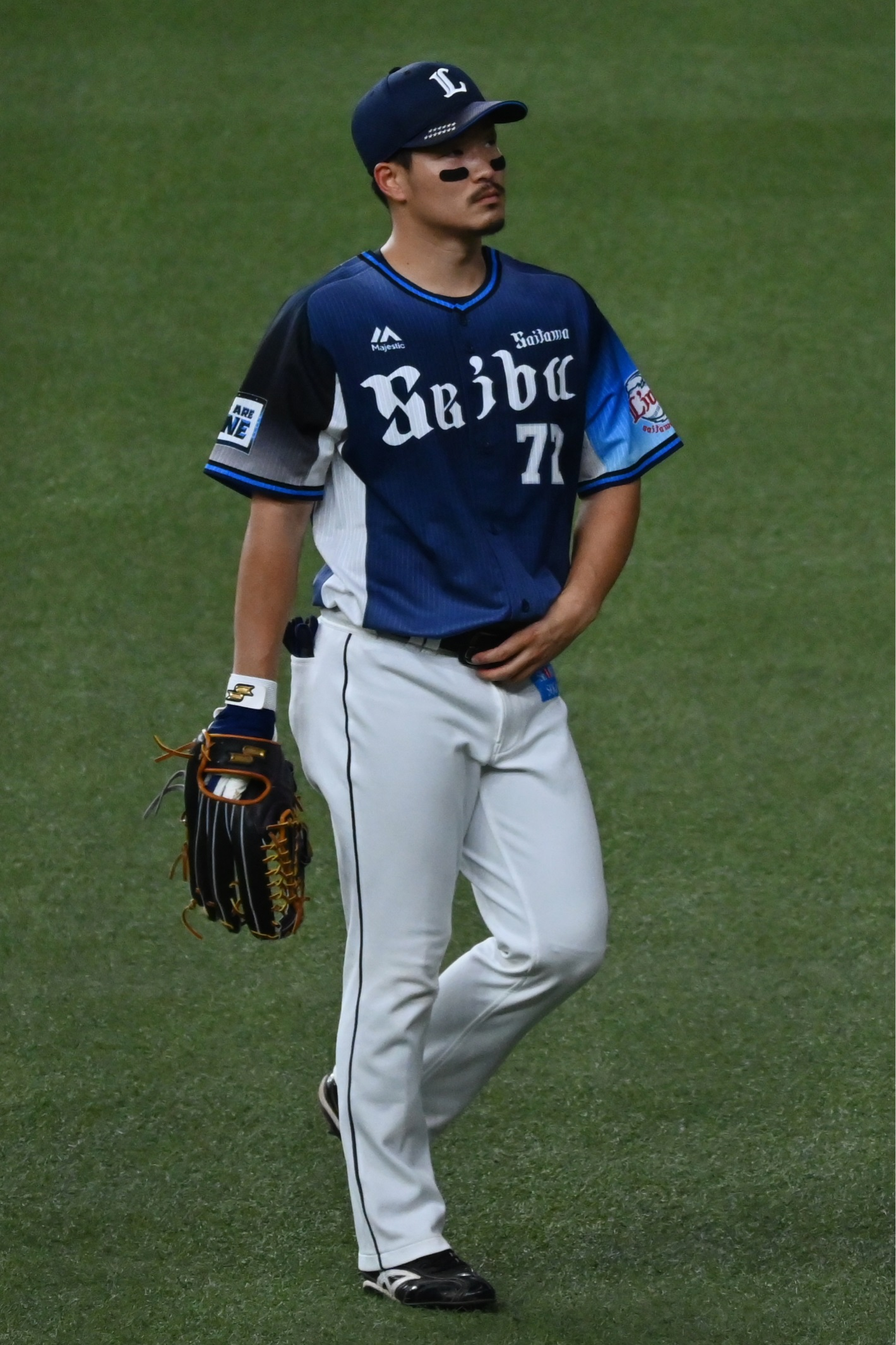

Chunichi Dragons – No. 44
- Outfielder
- Born: June 30, 1993 (age 33); Sapporo, Hokkaido, Japan
- Bats: Left Throws: Right

NPB debut
- June 23, 2020, for the Saitama Seibu Lions

NPB statistics (through 2023 season)
- Batting average: .218
- Hits: 93
- Home runs: 10
- Runs batted in: 36
- Stolen bases: 3

Teams
- Saitama Seibu Lions (2016–2023); Chunichi Dragons (2023–present)

Seiji Kawagoe (川越 誠司, Kawagoe Seiji; born June 30, 1993) is a Japanese professional baseball outfielder for the Chunichi Dragons of Nippon Professional Baseball (NPB). He previously played for the Saitama Seibu Lions.

== Career ==
Kawagoe played for the Saitama Seibu Lions from 2016 to 2023.

On July 18, 2023, he was traded to the Chunichi Dragons in exchange for Wataru Takamatsu.
