= Larry Raines =

American baseball player (1930–1978)

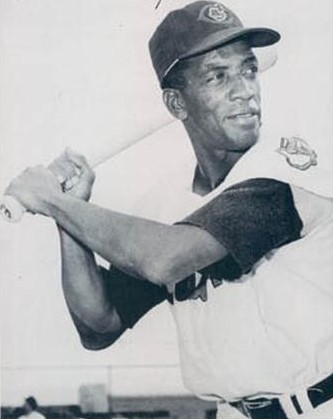
- Infielder
- Born: March 9, 1930; St. Albans, West Virginia, U.S.
- Died: January 28, 1978 (aged 47); Lansing, Michigan, U.S.
- Batted: Right Threw: Right

MLB debut
- April 16, 1957, for the Cleveland Indians

Last MLB appearance
- September 26, 1958, for the Cleveland Indians

MLB statistics
- Batting average: .253
- Home runs: 2
- Runs batted in: 16

NPB statistics
- Batting average: .302
- Home runs: 31
- Runs batted in: 172
- Stats at Baseball Reference

Teams
- Cleveland Indians (1957–1958); Hankyu Braves (1953–1954, 1962)

Lawrence Glenn Hope Raines (March 9, 1930 – January 28, 1978) was an American infielder in Major League Baseball who played from 1957 to 1958 for the Cleveland Indians.

== Biography ==
Born in St. Albans, West Virginia, Raines is recognized for having been the first ballplayer to perform professionally in Minor League Baseball, Negro league baseball, Japanese Baseball and the major leagues.

Raines debuted professionally with the Chicago American Giants of the Negro American League, a premier team owned and managed by the legendary Rube Foster. In 1952, he topped the East–West All-Star Game poll with a total of 24,583 votes and started at shortstop for the Western Division at Comiskey Park.

In 1953, Raines traveled to Japan where he played two seasons for the Hankyu Braves. Raines posted a .286 batting average with eight home runs and 49 runs batted in through 120 games in his season debut. Then in 1953, he won the Pacific League batting title with a .337 average, while collecting 18 homers and 96 RBI in 137 games.

Afterwards, Raines returned in 1955 to the United States and agreed to sign a minor league contract with the Cleveland Indians. Raines spent two years in the Cleveland minor league system before being promoted to the Indians in 1957. He was used sparingly in some ways, going up and down between the majors and the minors until 1958.

Raines later played from 1959 through 1961 at Triple-A level for the Philadelphia Phillies, Cincinnati Reds and Minnesota Twins organizations. He returned to Hankyu for one more season in 1962, retiring after that. In between, Raines played winterball in Venezuela for the Rapiños de Occidente club in its 1960-61 season.

Raines died in 1978 in Lansing, Michigan, at the age of 47.

== See also ==
- American expatriate baseball players in Japan
