= Takehiro Donoue =

Japanese baseball player

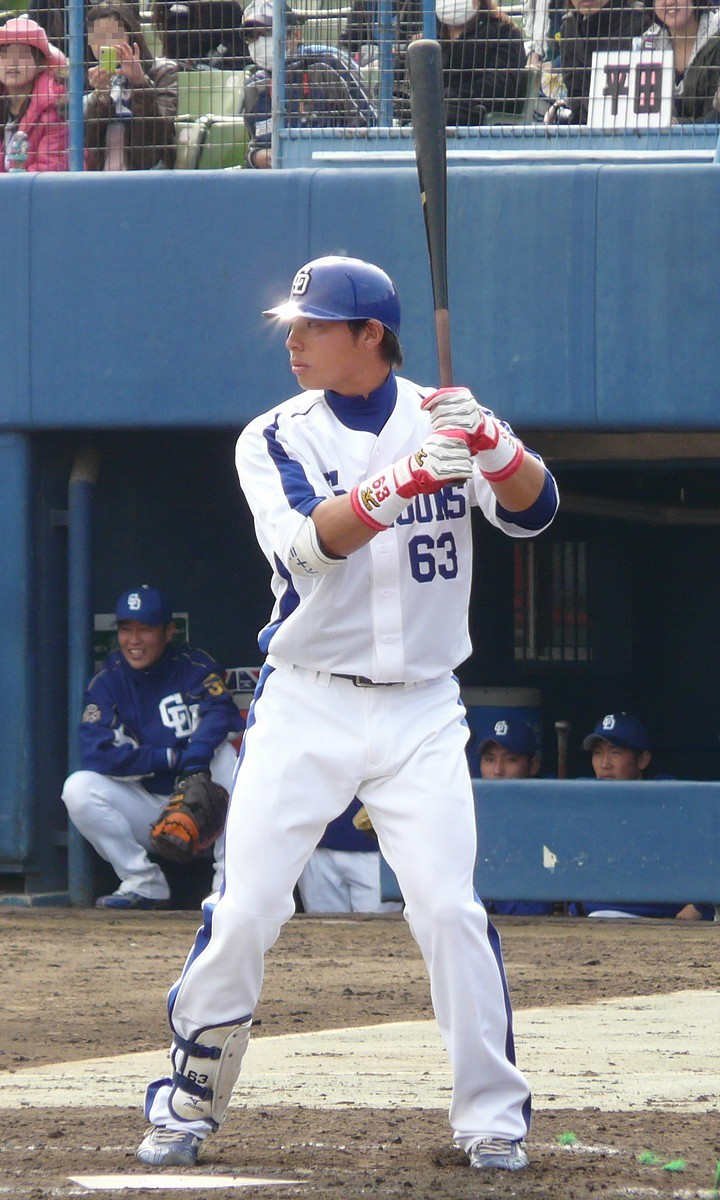
- Donoue with the Chunichi Dragons
- Outfielder / Coach
- Born: May 27, 1985 (age 41)
- Batted: Left Threw: Right

NPB debut
- September 10, 2005, for the Chunichi Dragons

Last appearance
- October 1, 2016, for the Yomiuri Giants

NPB statistics (through 2016)
- Batting average: .259
- Home runs: 15
- RBI: 86
- Stats at Baseball Reference

Teams
- As player: Chunichi Dragons (2004–2014); Yomiuri Giants (2015–2016); As coach: Yomiuri Giants (2019)

Takehiro Donoue (堂上 剛裕, born May 27, 1985, in Kasugai, Aichi) is a Japanese former professional baseball outfielder in Japan's Nippon Professional Baseball. He played with the Chunichi Dragons from 2005 to 2014 and with the Yomiuri Giants in 2015 and 2016.

His younger brother Naomichi also played for the Chunichi Dragons.
