= Ren Kondo =

Japanese baseball player (born 1998)

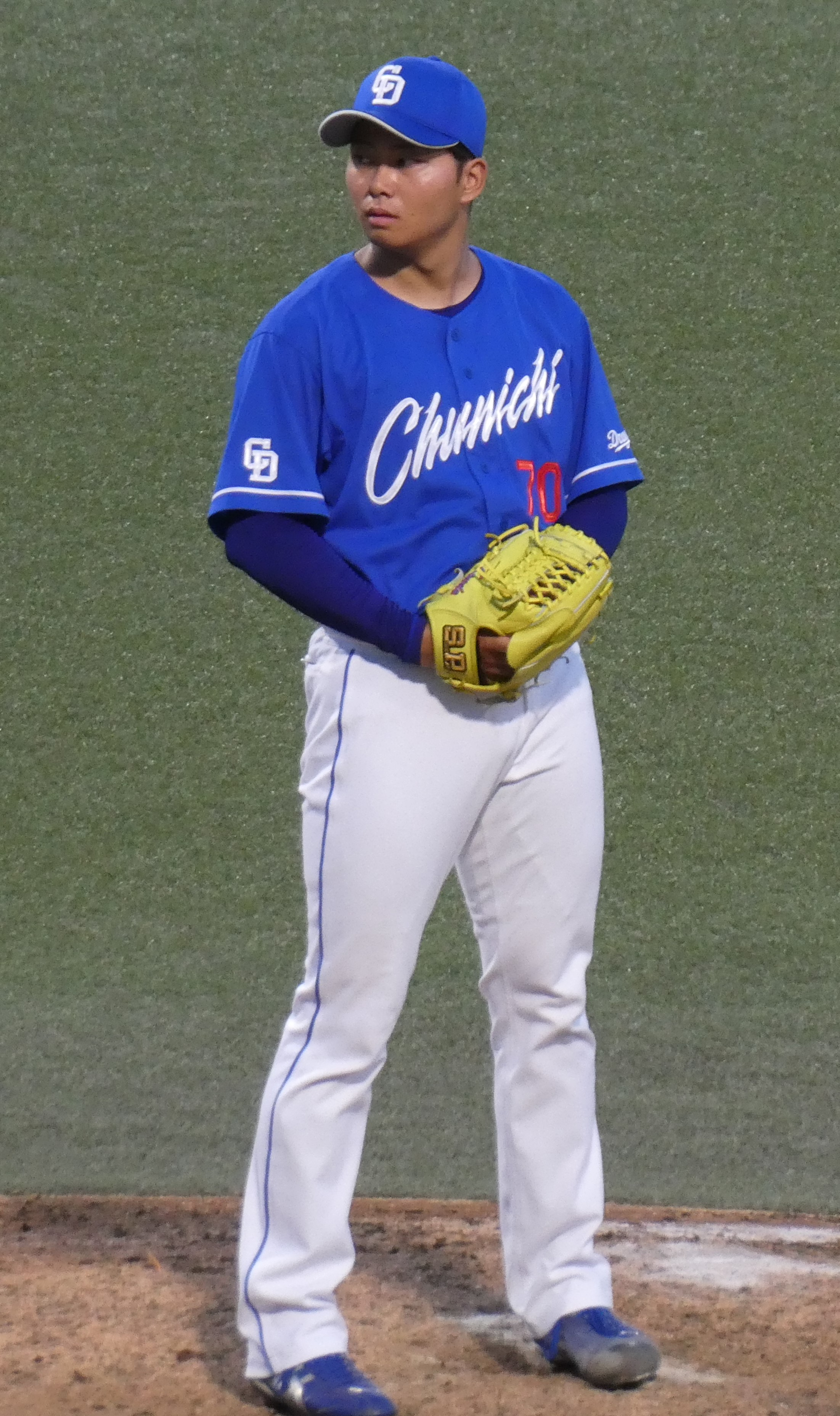
- Kondo in 2023

Chunichi Dragons – No. 70
- Pitcher
- Born: September 22, 1998 (age 27); Itabashi, Tokyo, Japan
- Bats: Left Throws: Left

debut
- May 28, 2021, for the Chunichi Dragons

Career statistics (through July 30, 2026)
- Win-Loss: 0–0
- ERA: 6.35
- Strikeouts: 23

Teams
- Chunichi Dragons (2021, 2023, 2025–Present)

Ren Kondo (近藤 廉, Kondo Ren; born September 22, 1998 in Itabashi, Tokyo, Japan) is a professional Japanese baseball player. He pitches for the Chunichi Dragons.

Kondo attended Toyonan High School in Tokyo, before going on to attend Sapporo Gakuin University. During his four years there, his team did not reach the first division.
