= Nobumasa Fukuda =

Japanese baseball player (born 1988)

Nobumasa Fukuda 福田 永将
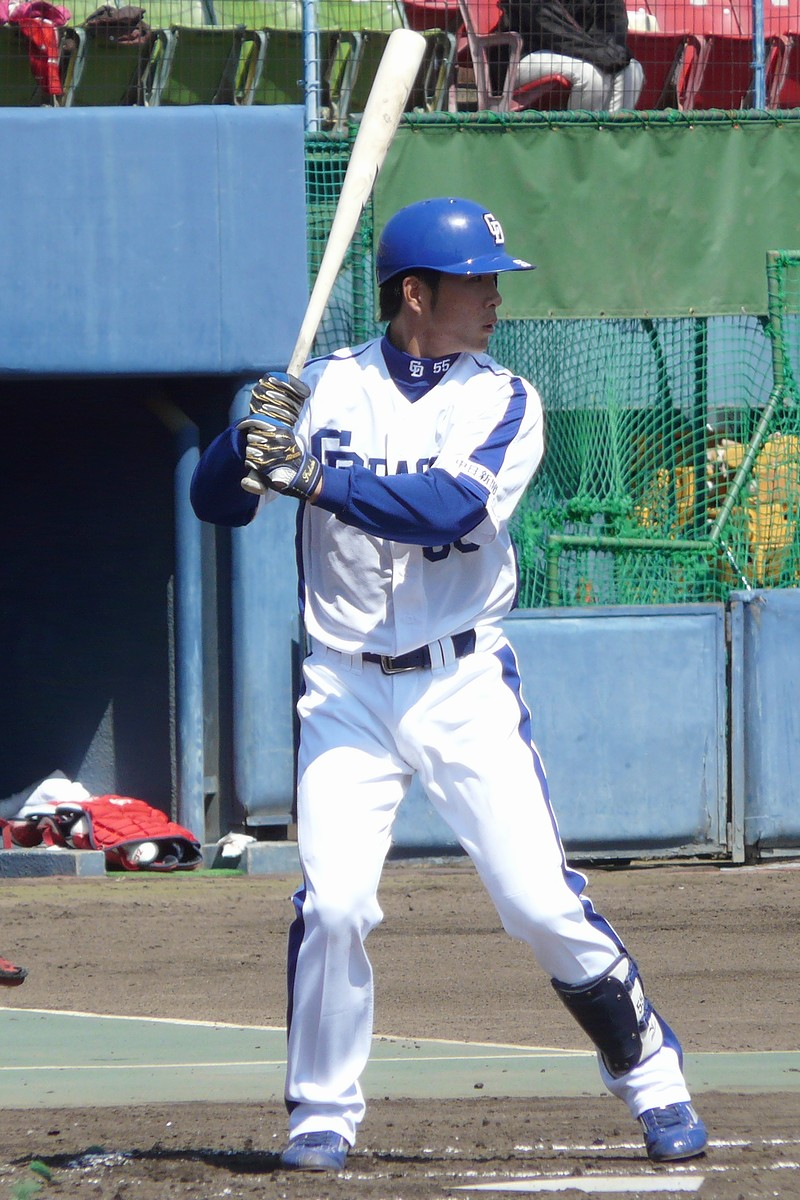

Chunichi Dragons – No. 84
- First baseman / Third baseman / Coach
- Born: 23 July 1988 (age 37); Aoba-ku, Yokohama, Kanagawa, Japan
- Batted: Right Threw: Right

NPB debut
- July 7, 2009, for the Chunichi Dragons

Last NPB appearance
- October 3, 2023, for the Chunichi Dragons

NPB statistics
- Batting average: .257
- Home runs: 84
- RBI: 298
- Stats at Baseball Reference

Teams
- As player: Chunichi Dragons (2007–2023); As coach: Chunichi Dragons (2024–present)

Nobumasa Fukuda (福田永将, Fukuda Nobumasa; born July 23, 1988) is a Japanese former professional baseball infielder and current coach for the Chunichi Dragons of Nippon Professional Baseball (NPB). He played in NPB for Chunichi from 2007 to 2023.

== Early career ==
Fukuda started playing baseball in grade 1 of primary school with the Kamoshida Swallows. In junior high, he caught the attention of scouts batting 4th for Midori Chuo Seniors and aiding his team to win the national championship. While playing at Kamoshida Junior High Fukuda's talent was recognized by the New York Mets who invited him to a club tryout.

Fukuda entered Yokohama High School based on his hitting abilities and sat on the bench in spring of his freshman year. As a catcher, he would later form a battery with Hideaki Wakui, 2 years his senior and alongside other future pro, Takehiro Ishikawa qualified for the Japanese High School Baseball Championship. While he was a regular, as it was his first year he was often changed out toward the end of games in important situations. From spring of his junior year he was installed at 4th in the batting order. At the 78th Japanese High School Baseball Invitational Tournament he performed duties at clean-up alongside Takuya Takahama and Kenji Sato. He led the team to victory as captain. In summer of the same year, Yokohama High was expected to be title favorites for the 88th Summer Championship but where beaten by a Sho Nakata lead Osaka Tōin High School 6–11 on the first day of play with Fukuda failing to register a hit.

Rated because of his 49 career high school home runs, he was drafted in the 3rd round of the 2006 NPB Draft high school player round by the Chunichi Dragons and on 11 November signed a provisional contract with a ¥50,000,000 sign-on bonus and a ¥5,400,000 yearly salary.

== Professional career ==
=== 2007-2008 ===
Out of the Dragons draftees taken in 2006, Fukuda's batting was rated the highest and as such he was invited to train with the first team in Spring Camp. He was subsequently invited to an Olympic preparation tournament by then manager Hiromitsu Ochiai. He was expected to be third-string catcher behind Motonobu Tanishige and Kohei Oda but due to the existence of fellow rookie Daisuke Tanaka he finished the farm season making only 9 appearances and failing to register a hit. In order to increase his chance of appearing on the field he was instructed to convert to an infielder and in the off-season started training as a first baseman.

In 2008 spring camp, Fukuda became the roommate of Dragons stalwart Masahiro Yamamoto. At the request of manager, Hiromitsu Ochiai he was told to completely convert to first base. However, this did not result in any first-team appearances. Other members of his draft class Naomichi Donoue, Kyohei Iwasaki and Akinobu Shimizu however all saw time in the first team which left Fukuda to be the only member of his class to not have made an appearance in the top team. However, he made more appearances with the farm team batting 4th marking his improvement by hitting a home run off former major leaguer Kazuhisa Ishii in the fall Phoenix League.

=== 2009-2011 ===
In spring camp, Fukuda was once again invited to train with the first team but injured his calf in practice where he was then demoted to the farm team to recover. He was the Western League monthly MVP in June and in July he was brought up to the first team. On 7 July 2009, Fukuda made his debut against the Tokyo Yakult Swallows pinch hitting for Kenichi Nakata at Meiji Jingu Stadium and became the 49th player in NPB history to hit a home-run in his first at-bat. He made his first field appearance as a substitute for an injured Tony Blanco at first base on 31 July however poor hitting as a pinch-hitter thereafter led to his demotion to the farm in August.

In 2010 open and practice games, Fukuda was entrusted at 4th in the line-up where he hit .316 with 7 home runs however his season with the first team would end with only 15 appearances made.

After working well in the build-up to the 2011 season, he was on the opening day roster as a right-handed pinch-hitter. He continued as a pinch hitter from opening day and on 13 April, hit his second pro home run off the pitching of Yokohama DeNA Baystars reliever Shintaro Ejiri. His form would continue and on 15 April he hit his 3rd pro home run, once again as a pinch hitter, off the pitching of Hanshin Tigers reliever Kyuji Fujikawa. However, in the next 5 plate appearances he would fail to register a hit leading him to being dropped to the farm. He would return to the first team in October where he would make his first Japan Series appearance.

=== 2012-2014 ===
With the trade of catcher Keiji Oyama to the Rakuten Golden Eagles, Fukuda made a return to catching. Efforts were made to give him play time in pre-season matches and he made the opening day roster as third-string catcher. On May 5, Fukuda made his professional catching debut against the Yokohama DeNA Baystars, but in the same game but his first-ever appearance at second base. Once again in the same game, Fukuda would hit his first home run of the season. At the end of the season, Fukuda has played a personal best 49 games but he was unable to shine with the bat, registering a .176 average and one home run. Once again he found himself mostly as a first baseman throughout the season and made the conversion back to the infield in the off-season.

In 2013 Fukuda's playing time was limited to 4 appearances in the first team where he averaged .286 in 7 at-bats. On the farm, Fukuda would average just .234, hitting two home runs in 58 games.

The following season once again play time was limited in the first team where he hit .250 in 12 at bats. On the farm however, Fukuda showed an uptick in production hitting .302 with 7 homeruns in 94 games.

=== 2015-2016 ===
From spring training in 2015, Fukuda changed his batting form and hit 4 home runs and a league top 13 RBIs in pre-season fixtures where he made the opening day roster for the first time in 3 years. Due to an injury to opening day first baseman, Masahiko Morino, Fukuda made his first seasons start on March 31 against the Yomiuri Giants where he raked 3 hits, 2 RBIs and a homerun. From April, Fukuda was given more opportunities at first-base. On 21 June, it was announced that the Dragons cheering section had created a personalized song and from 23 June became common use. In the middle of the season, his result as a pinch-hitter declined but he was able to play in a personal best 79 games and hit 6 home runs. During the season pre-match practice, Fukuda was also seen practicing in left field. On 13 November, Fukuda signed an improved contract deal increasing ¥8,500,000 to ¥15,000,000.

With former Chicago White Sox major leaguer, Dayan Viciedo joining the team as first baseman in 2016, Fukuda found most of his appearances at third base after Shuhei Takahashi's injury in April and then later in left field. With Viciedo's injury toward the end of season, he also saw time at first base and fourth in the order where he ended the season with 10 home runs.

=== 2017-2018 ===
An injury to his right shoulder in the lead-up to opening day, Fukuda joined the team on 23 April. He hit his season first homerun on 7 July against the Yokohama DeNA Baystars and between July and August hit a personal best 14 homeruns, ending the season with 18.

For the 2018 season, Fukuda replaced Yudai Ono as player chairman at the beginning of the year and was a regular at third base throughout the season where he passed the stipulate at-bats to be considered for post-season awards. It also marked his first 100 hit season. He hit 14 home runs with a slash line of .261/.322/.405 playing in 133 games.

On 24 November, Fukuda signed an improved contract deal increasing ¥11,000,000 to a total of ¥47,000,000.

=== 2023 ===
In September 18, 2023, he retired after 17 years.
