= Maura O'Halloran =

Irish Zen Buddhist monk

Maura O'Halloran Go-Roshi

Personal life
- Born: May 24, 1955 Boston, Massachusetts
- Died: October 22, 1982 (aged 27) Chiang Mai, Thailand
- Cause of death: Traffic collision
- Education: Trinity College Dublin
- Other name: Daigo Soshin Bikuni

Religious life
- Religion: Buddhism
- Denomination: Zen Buddhism
- Sect: Sōtō
- Dharma names: Soshin

Senior posting
- Teacher: Tetsugyu Soin Ban

Maura "Soshin" O'Halloran (May 24, 1955 – October 22, 1982) was an Irish Zen Buddhist monk. She is known for her book Pure Heart, Enlightened Mind, which was posthumously published, and for being one of the "first of few Western women allowed to practice in a traditional Japanese Zen monastery".

== Biography ==
O'Halloran was born in Boston, Massachusetts in 1955 and her parents moved to Ireland when she was four years old. Her father was originally from County Kerry while her mother was native of Maine. In Ireland, O'Halloran was educated in Loreto College, Foxrock in Dublin and later attended Trinity College Dublin, where she graduated with a joint degree in mathematical economics/statistics and sociology. Shortly after her graduation O'Halloran travelled to Japan, where she studied to become a Zen monk at Toshoji in Tokyo and at Kannonji in the Iwate Prefecture.

On November 18, 1979, O'Halloran contacted and went to the Toshoji Temple where she met the master at the time, Tetsugyu Soin Ban, who she respected with the honorific title "Go-Roshi." On November 23, 1979, she was given the Dharma name of "Soshin", meaning something like "Genuine Heart/Mind". In June 1982 she completed the Denbóshiki ceremony which allowed her to be an oshō, a priest in charge of a temple, while her Hasansai (graduation ceremony) was held on 7 August 1982. Following the completion of her training, O'Halloran and her teacher had a disagreement; She felt she should open a Buddhist temple in Ireland while he sought to have her remain in Japan and eventually succeed him at Kannonji temple.

On 8 August 1982, O'Halloran decided she would travel back to Ireland. O'Halloran first travelled through Hong Kong and Macao. It was while she was in Thailand that she was hit and killed in a traffic accident in Chiang Mai on October 22, 1982. After her death she was titled "Great Enlightened Lady, of the same heart and mind as the Great Teacher Buddha" and a statue was dedicated to her at the temple she studied at in Iwate Prefecture.

== Bibliography ==
- Pure Heart, Enlightened Mind: The Zen Journal and Letters of Maura "Soshin" O'Halloran. Charles E. Tuttle Company, Boston, 1994. ISBN 9780804819770.
