= Takumi Yamamoto =

Japanese baseball player (born 2000)

Takumi Yamamoto 山本 拓実
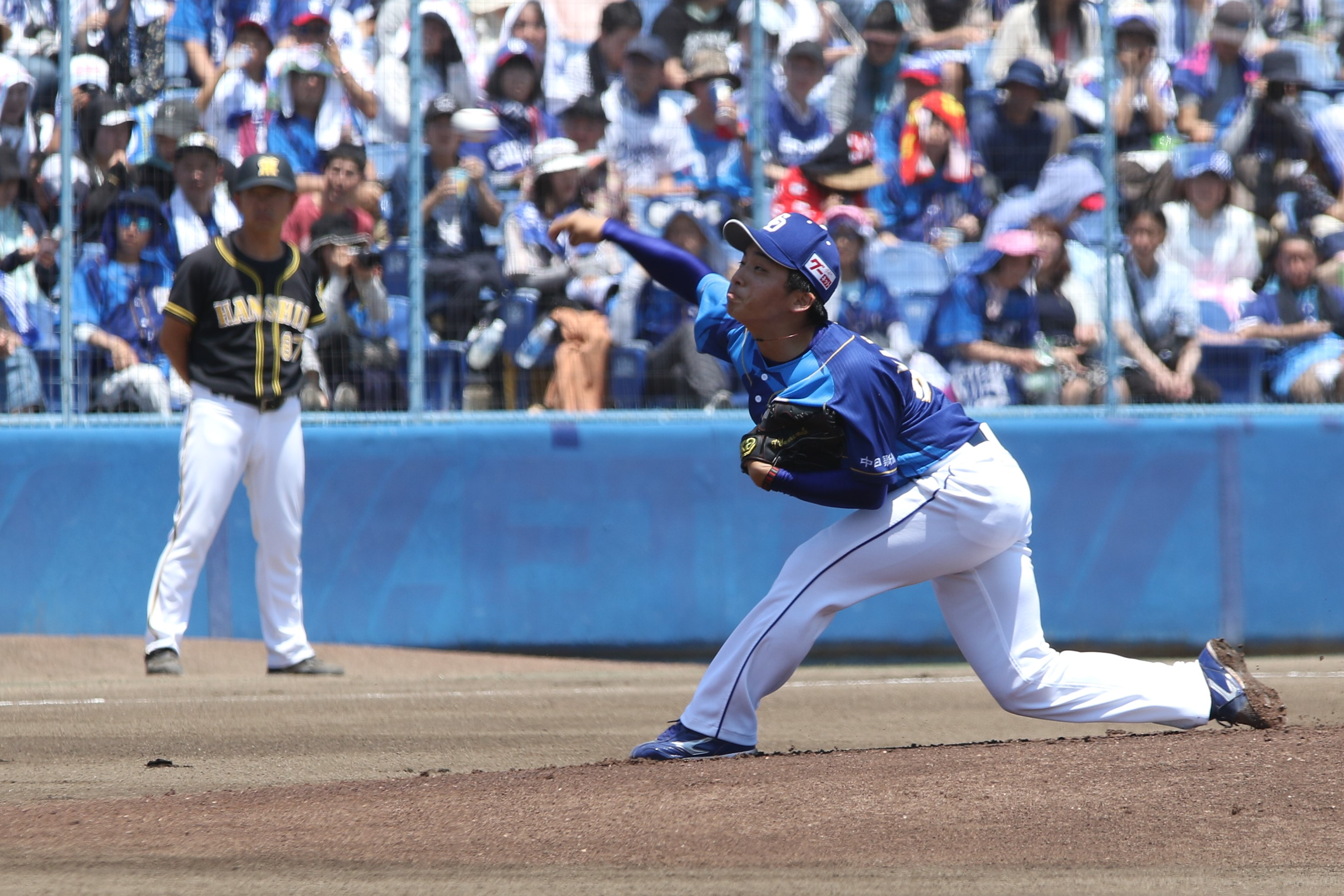

Hokkaido Nippon-Ham Fighters – No. 67
- Pitcher
- Born: January 31, 2000 (age 25); Takarazuka, Hyogo, Japan
- Bats: Right Throws: Right

NPB debut
- September 12, 2018, for the Chunichi Dragons

NPB statistics (through 2024 season)
- Win–loss record: 12-7
- Earned run average: 3.43
- Strikeouts: 146
- Saves: 0
- Holds: 10

Teams
- Chunichi Dragons (2018–2023); Hokkaido Nippon-Ham Fighters (2023–present)

Takumi Yamamoto (山本 拓実, Yamamoto Takumi; born January 31, 2000 in Takarazuka, Hyogo, Japan) is a professional Japanese baseball pitcher for the Hokkaido Nippon-Ham Fighters of Nippon Professional Baseball (NPB). He has previously played in NPB for the Chunichi Dragons.

== Career ==
=== Chunichi Dragons ===
On October 20, 2017, Yamamoto was selected as the 6th draft pick for the Chunichi Dragons at the 2017 NPB Draft. On November 18, he signed a provisional contract with a ¥25,000,000 sign-on bonus and a ¥5,500,000 yearly salary.

=== Hokkaido Nippon-Ham Fighters ===
On June 19, 2023, Yamamoto was traded alongside Yūya Gunji to the Hokkaido Nippon-Ham Fighters in exchange for Shingo Usami and Koki Saito.
