= Yūya Gunji =

Japanese baseball player (born 1997)

Yūya Gunji 郡司 裕也
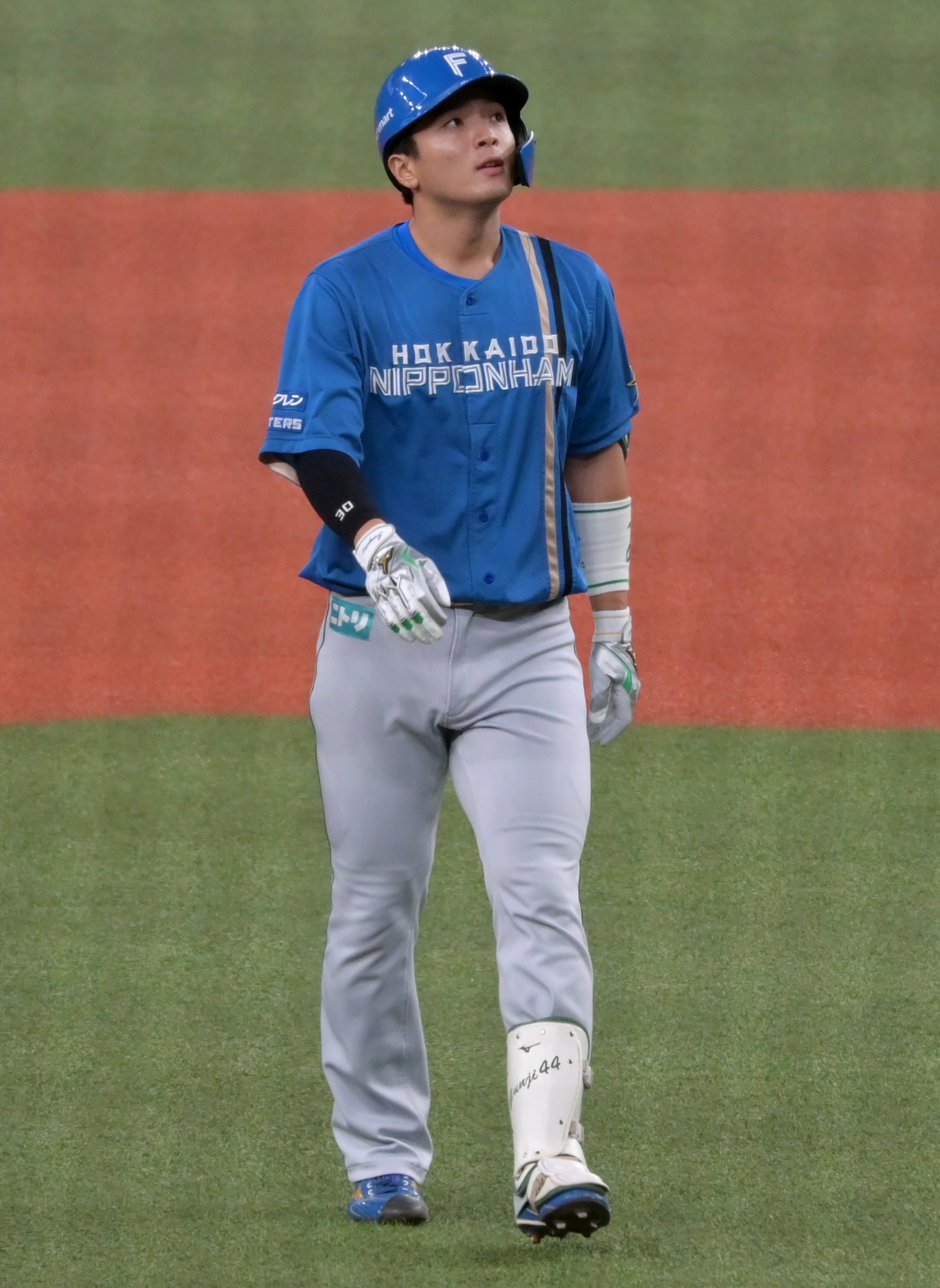

Hokkaido Nippon-Ham Fighters – No. 3
- Catcher, Infielder, Outfielder
- Born: December 27, 1997 (age 28); Ichihara, Chiba, Japan
- Bats: Right Throws: Right

NPB debut
- June 23, 2020, for the Chunichi Dragons

NPB statistics (through 2025 season)
- Batting average: .263
- Hits: 288
- Home runs: 25
- Runs batted in: 117
- Stolen base: 4

Teams
- Chunichi Dragons (2020–2023); Hokkaido Nippon-Ham Fighters (2023–present)

Career highlights and awards
- NPB All-Star (2024)
Medals
Men's baseball
Representing Japan
U-18 Baseball World Cup
Silver medal – second place	2015 Osaka	Team

Yūya Gunji (郡司 裕也, Gunji Yūya; born December 27, 1997) is a Japanese professional baseball catcher, infielder and outfielder for the Hokkaido Nippon-Ham Fighters of Nippon Professional Baseball (NPB). He has previously played in NPB for the Chunichi Dragons.

== Career ==
Gunji was the opposing catcher at the 2015 Koshien tournament for Sendai Ikuei where future teammate, Tokai Sagami high school ace, Shinnosuke Ogasawara was the winning pitcher.

Gunji is a graduate of Sendai Ikuei High School and Keio University.

=== Chunichi Dragons ===
On October 17, 2019, Gunji was selected as the 2nd draft pick for the Chunichi Dragons at the 2019 NPB Draft and on November 22 signed a provisional contract with a ¥50,000,000 sign-on bonus and a ¥9,000,000 yearly salary.

=== Hokkaido Nippon-Ham Fighters ===
On June 19, 2023, Gunji was traded alongside Takumi Yamamoto to the Hokkaido Nippon-Ham Fighters in exchange for Shingo Usami and Koki Saito.
