= Naomichi Donoue =

Japanese baseball player and coach (born 1988)

Naomichi Donoue 堂上 直倫
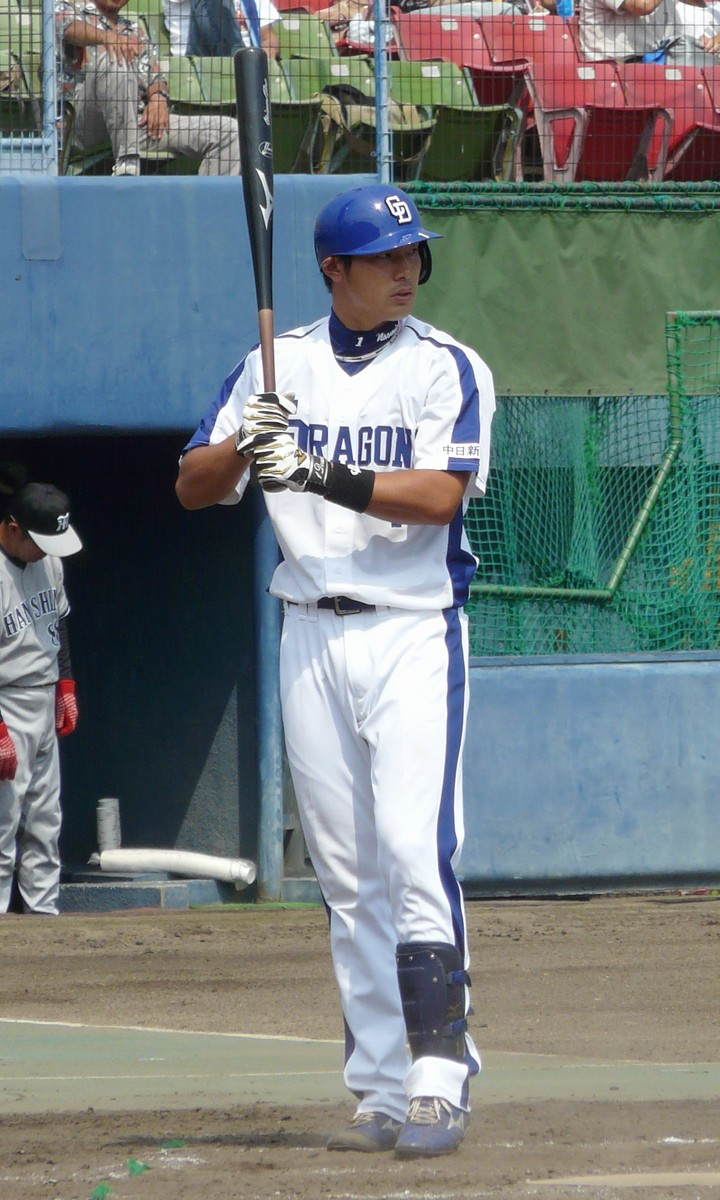

Chunichi Dragons – No. 71
- Utility infielder/Coach
- Born: 23 September 1988 (age 37); Kasugai, Aichi, Japan
- Batted: Right Threw: Right

NPB debut
- August 3, 2008, for the Chunichi Dragons

Last NPB appearance
- October 3, 2023, for the Chunichi Dragons

NPB statistics (through 2023 season)
- Batting average: .225
- Hits: 476
- Home runs: 34
- RBI: 209
- Stats at Baseball Reference

Teams
- As player: Chunichi Dragons (2007-2023); As coach: Chunichi Dragons (2024-Present)

Naomichi Donoue (堂上 直倫, born September 23, 1988, in Japan) is a coach and former Japanese professional baseball player for the Chunichi Dragons in Japan's Nippon Professional Baseball. He was a utility infielder and has played at various positions including short stop, third base and second base.

== Career ==
Donoue was the first draft pick for the Dragons at the 2006 NPB Draft, the same draft class as teammates Takuya Asao and Nobumasa Fukuda.

While mainly used as a utility infielder for the majority of his career, Donoue became the every day starting shortstop for the Dragons in the 2016 season showing great defensive abilities as well as handy form with the bat.

On 28 August 2016, Donoue hit his first career grand slam at the Nagoya Dome against the would-be Central League champion Hiroshima Carp in a 7–5 victory.

== Personal ==
His father Terashi is a former pro having pitched for the Chunichi Dragons between 1971 and 1985. His elder brother Takehiro is former professional baseball player who played for both the Dragons and the Yomiuri Giants.
