= Kohei Oda (scientist) =

Japanese microbiologist

Kohei Oda is a Japanese microbiologist and an emeritus professor at Kyoto Institute of Technology. He is known for his work on bacterial discovery and bacterial metabolism. In particular, he led a team of Japanese scientists in the discovery of plastic-degrading bacteria, Ideonella sakaiensis, in 2016.
