= Hiroshi Ohshita =

Japanese baseball player and coach

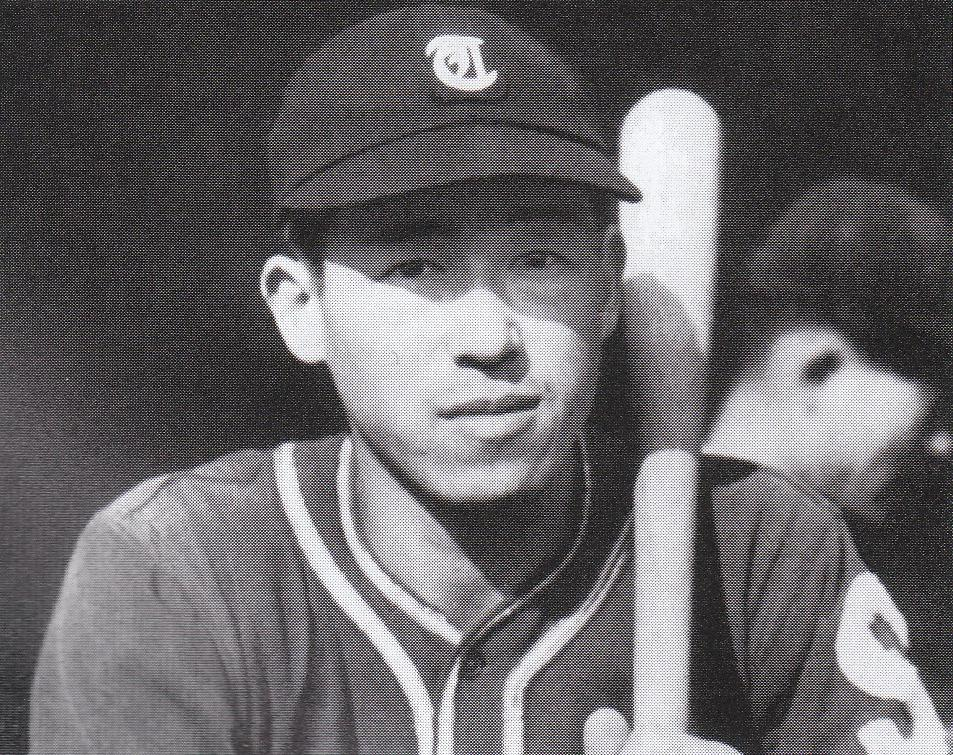
- Hiroshi Ohshita as a rookie in 1946
- Outfielder
- Born: December 15, 1922; Kobe, Japan
- Died: May 23, 1979 (aged 56)
- Batted: Left Threw: Left

Japanese Baseball League debut
- 1945, for the Senators

Last NPB appearance
- 1959, for the Nishitetsu Lions

Career statistics
- Batting average: .303
- Hits: 1,667
- Home runs: 201
- Runs batted in: 861
- Runs: 763
- Stolen bases: 146
- Stats at Baseball Reference

Teams
- As player: Tokyu Flyers (1946–1951); Nishitetsu Lions (1952–1959); As coach: Hankyu Braves (1961); Toei Flyers (1968); Taiyo Whales (1974–1975)

Career highlights and awards
- 3x Japan Series champion (1956, 1957, 1958); 8x Best Nine Award (1947, 1949-1954, 1957); Japan Series MVP (1957)

Member of the Japanese

Baseball Hall of Fame
- Induction: 1980

Hiroshi Ohshita (大下 弘, Ōshita Hiroshi; December 15, 1922 – May 23, 1979), also spelled Oshita, was a Japanese Baseball Hall of Fame outfielder who began his career after World War II. Known for his trademark blue bat, he hit a record 20 home runs in a season and was home run king and leading hitter three times for the Toei Flyers. Ohshita was also a heavy hitter with the Nishitetsu Lions of the Pacific League during the 1950s.

== Early life ==
Ohshita was born in Sannomiya, Kobe, Hyōgo Prefecture on December 15, 1922. His father died in war when he was a child; his family moved to Takao, Taiwan, where he grew up. Ohshita graduated from Takao Commercial High School, and was recruited by Tairiku Watanabe to attend Meiji University, a private university in Japan which was noted for its baseball program. Meiji University belongs to the Tokyo Big6 Baseball League, an intercollegiate league with five other schools: Waseda University, Keio University, Rikkyo University, Hosei University and the University of Tokyo; Ohshita played for the Meiji University baseball team. During World War II, he was a second lieutenant in the Imperial Japanese Army and trained as a kamikaze pilot before the war's end on August 15, 1945.

== Career ==
Ohshita joined the Japanese Professional Baseball League in 1946, playing for the Senators and hitting a record 20 home runs. The following season (1947), the Senators changed their name to the Tokyo Flyers; Ohshita won the leading-hitter and home-run-king titles, and became a household name in Japan. Children admired him; his trademark was a blue-painted bat and his rival, Tetsuharu Kawakami of the Tokyo Giants, used a red-painted bat. Fans called him "blue-bat Ohshita" (ao batto no Ohshita), and Kawakami was known as "red-bat Kawakami" (aka batto no Kawakami). Ohshita was again leading hitter for the 1950 season and repeated as leading hitter and home-run king for the 1951 season. His batting average of .383 for 1951 was a long-time Japanese record; he also holds the Japanese record of seven hits in seven at-bats in a single game.

After the 1951 season, Ohshita was traded to the Nishitetsu Lions, with whom he won the 1954 Pacific League MVP award with an average of .321. The Lions won the Pacific League pennant but lost to the Nagoya Chunichi Dragons (the Central League champions) in the Japan Series. However, the Lions defeated the Central League champion Tokyo Giants in the Japan Series three times (from 1956 to 1958); Ohshita was Series MVP in 1957. Ohshita retired as a player in 1959, with a record of 1,667 hits in 1,547 games (more than one hit per game). He was Japan's leading hitter three times (in 1947, 1950 and 1951), and a three-time home run king (in 1946, 1947 and 1951).

Ohshita's uniform number (3) was retired by the Lions, but he wore it again later as manager of the Tokyo Toei Flyers in 1968. He was a hitting coach for the Hankyu Braves in 1961, before becoming a baseball commentator. When managing the Flyers, Ohshita used no signs in games and his players had no curfew; when the team finished last in the Pacific League, he was fired by its owner after the season. Ohshita was again a hitting coach for the Taiyo Whales in 1974 and 1975. He was inducted into the Japanese Baseball Hall of Fame in 1980, the year after his death.

== Personal life ==
Ohshita was married to Tetsuko, and they had three children: a son, Masaru and two daughters, Hiroko and Hiromi. For years following his professional career, Ohshita coached youth baseball. After suffering a stroke in June 1978, he died May 23, 1979, and is entombed in the Wakaba district of Chiba, Chiba, Japan.

== See also ==
- Professional baseball in Japan

== Bibliography ==
- Hiroshi Ohshita, "The Diary of Hiroshi Ohshita". Baseball Magazine, 1980.
- Hiroshi Ohshita and Jun Henmi, The Rainbow Life. Shinchosha, 1992.
