= Ryotaro Doi =

Japanese baseball player

- Pitcher
- Born: January 11, 1981 (age 44); Kochi, Kochi, Japan
- Bats: Right Throws: Right

NPB debut
- April 20, 2003, for the Yokohama BayStars

NPB statistics (through 2007)
- Win–loss record: 1-5
- ERA: 4.22
- Strikeouts: 56

Teams
- Yokohama BayStars (2003–2006); Chiba Lotte Marines (2006–2007)

Ryotaro Doi (土居 龍太郎, Doi Ryōtarō) (born January 11, 1981) is a former professional baseball player in Japan. Doi for a period played for the Yokohama BayStars. Doi played as a pitcher.
