= Tetsujyo Deguchi =

Japanese Zen master

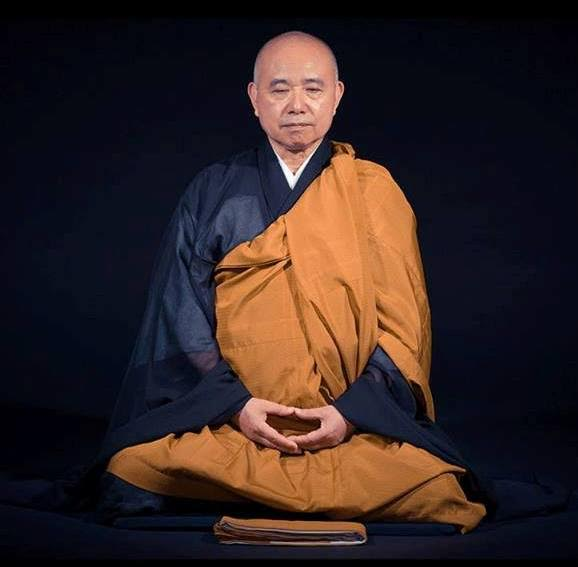
Master Tetsujo Deguchi

Tetsujyo Deguchi (born 1950) is a Japanese Zen master and disciple of Ban Tetsugyu Soin.

Deguchi contributed to the spread of Zen in Italy and contributed to the foundation of the Zen monastery Ensoji il Cerchio. He began practicing zazen as a teenager and took monastic vows when he was 30 years old. He holds a law degree from Chuo University, Tokyo and is the current abbot of Tosho-ji, Tokyo.

In 2017 he participated in the opening of a Zen temple in Padua.
