= Yūgo Umeno =

Japanese baseball player (born 1999)

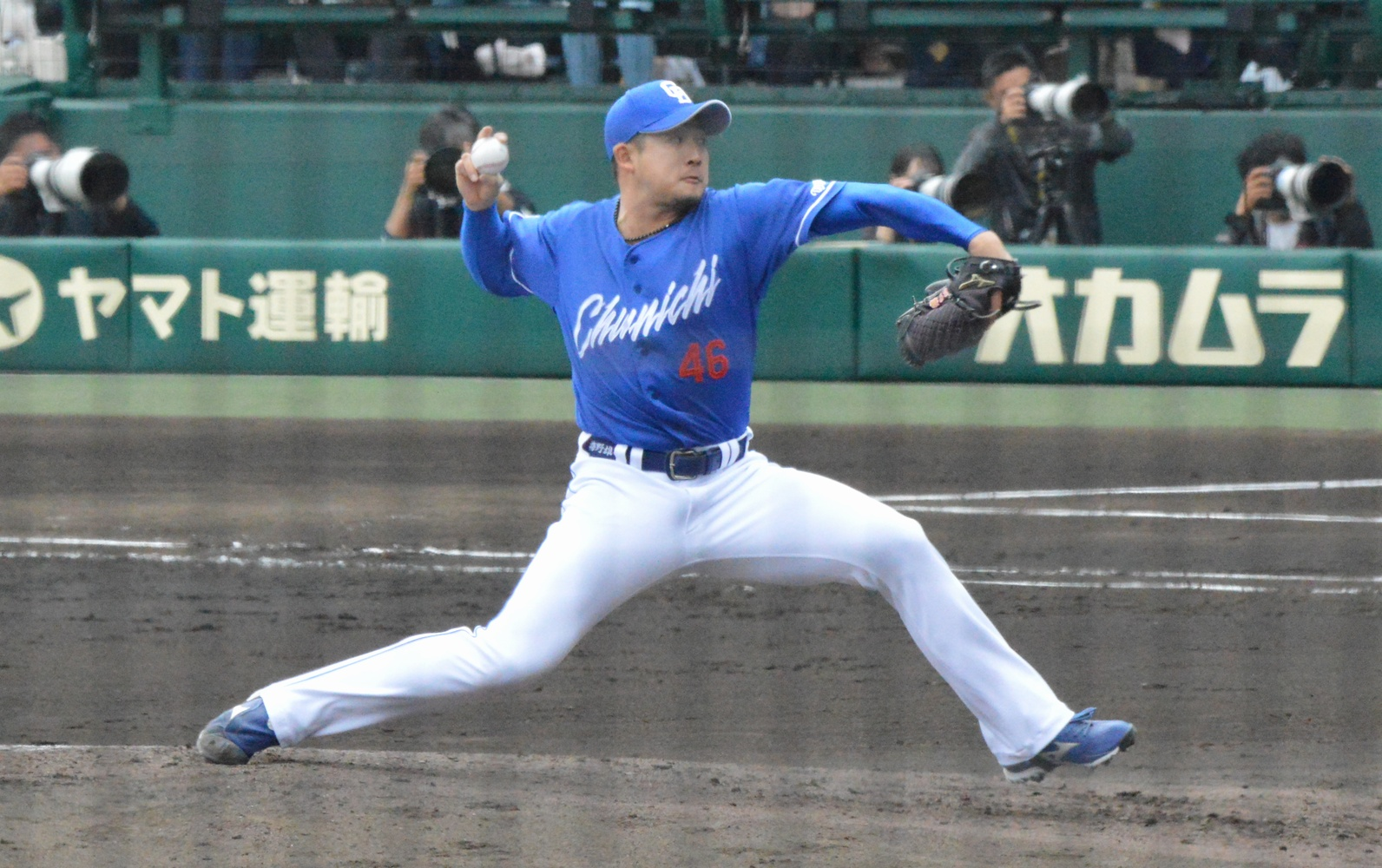
- Umeno with the Chunichi Dragons

Chunichi Dragons – No. 46
- Pitcher
- Born: January 13, 1999 (age 27); Saga, Saga, Japan
- Bats: Right Throws: Right

debut
- August 9, 2017, for the Tokyo Yakult Swallows

NPB statistics (through 2025 season)
- Win–loss: 17-12
- ERA: 3.97
- Strikeouts: 241
- Saves: 4
- Holds: 78
- Stats at Baseball Reference

Teams
- Tokyo Yakult Swallows (2017–2023); Chunichi Dragons (2024–present)

Yūgo Umeno (梅野 雄吾, Umeno Yūgo; born January 13, 1999 in Saga, Saga, Japan) is a professional Japanese baseball player. He plays pitcher for the Chunichi Dragons.

On February 27, 2019, he was selected for Japan national baseball team at the 2019 exhibition games against Mexico.

On December 8, 2023, Umeno was selected by the Chunichi Dragons in the 2023 Active Player Draft.
