= Shingo Usami =

Japanese baseball player (born 1993)

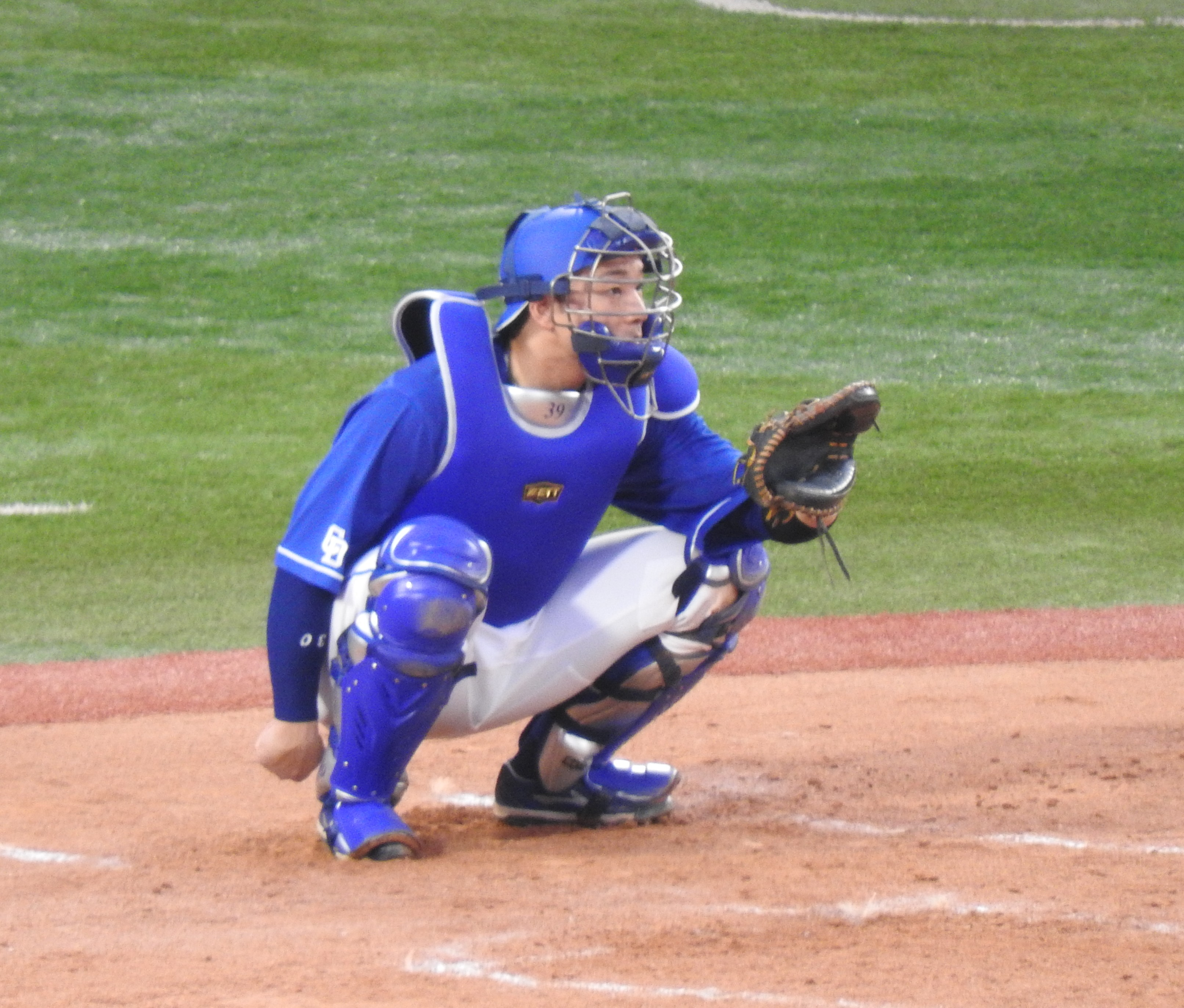
- Usami catching for the Dragons in September 2023

Chunichi Dragons – No. 39
- Catcher, Infielder
- Born: June 4, 1993 (age 33); Matsudo, Chiba, Japan
- Bats: Left Throws: Right

NPB debut
- August 8, 2017, for the Yomiuri Giants

NPB statistics (through 2024 season)
- Batting average: .236
- Home runs: 19
- RBI: 92
- Stats at Baseball Reference

Teams
- Yomiuri Giants (2017–2019); Hokkaido Nippon-Ham Fighters (2019–2023); Chunichi Dragons (2023–present)

Shingo Usami (宇佐見 真吾, Usami Shingo; born June 4, 1993) is a Japanese professional baseball catcher and infielder for the Chunichi Dragons of Nippon Professional Baseball (NPB). He has previously played in NPB for the Yomiuri Giants and Hokkaido Nippon-Ham Fighters.

== Professional career ==
=== Yomiuri Giants ===
On November 16, 2018, he was selected Yomiuri Giants roster at the 2018 MLB Japan All-Star Series exhibition game against MLB All-Stars.

=== Hokkaido Nippon-Ham Fighters ===
On June 26, 2019, Usami and teammate, pitcher Mitsuo Yoshikawa were traded to the Hokkaido Nippon-Ham Fighters in exchange for pitchers, Yohei Kagiya and Takahiro Fujioka.

=== Chunichi Dragons ===
On June 19, 2023, Usami was traded alongside Koki Saito to the Chunichi Dragons in exchange for Yūya Gunji and Takumi Yamamoto.

== Personal life ==
On November 6, 2022 Usami and Reni Takagi, a member of Japanese idol group Momoiro Clover Z, announced through their respective social media accounts that they had married. They divorced about a little over a year later, on December 14, 2023.
