= Kohei Oda (baseball) =

Japanese baseball player (born 1977)

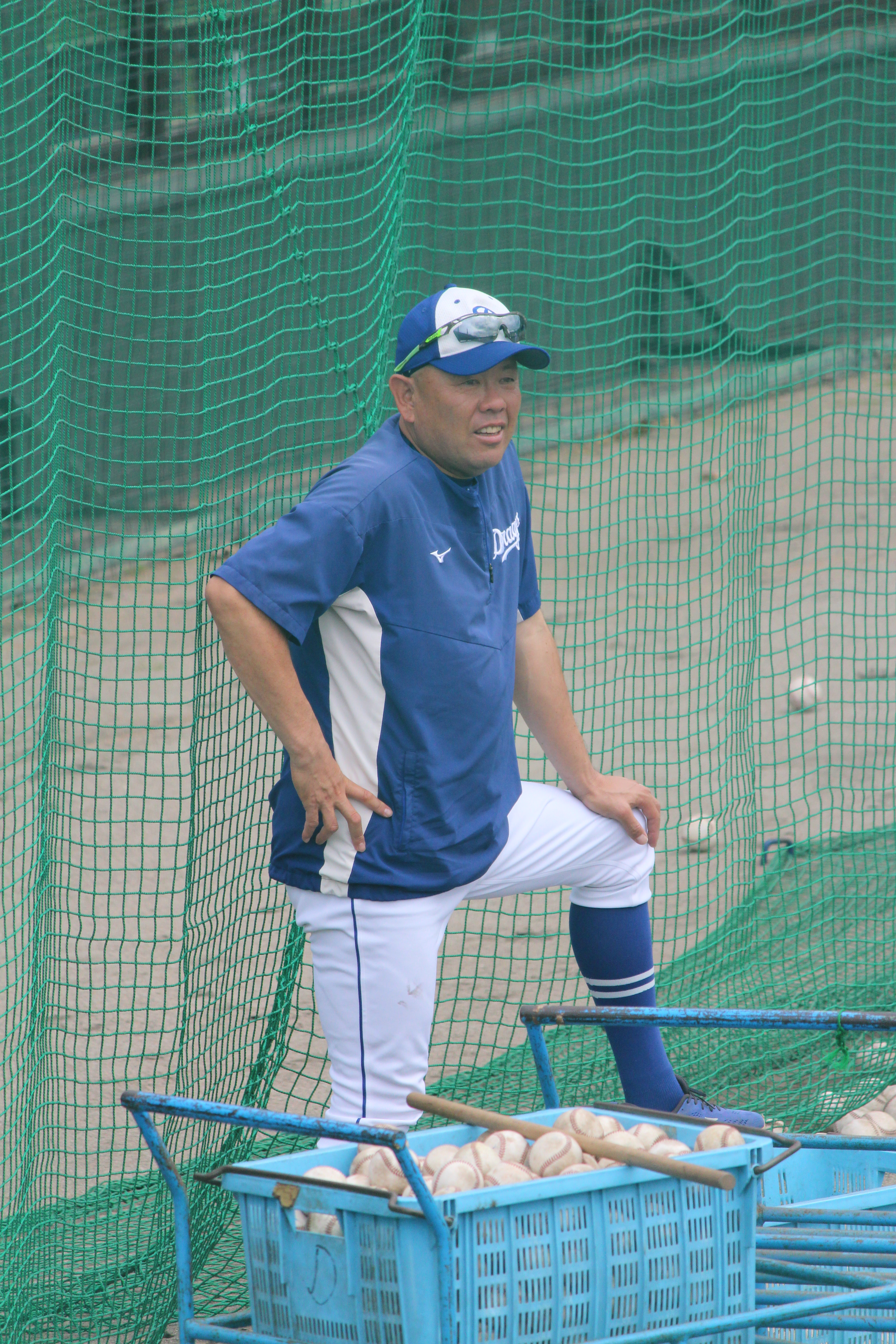
- Catcher/Coach
- Born: March 15, 1977 (age 49)
- Batted: Right Threw: Right

NPB debut
- October 1, 1998, for the Yomiuri Giants

Last NPB appearance
- September 23, 2014, for the Chunichi Dragons

NPB statistics (through 2014)
- Batting average: .197
- Home runs: 2
- RBI: 45
- Stats at Baseball Reference

Teams
- As player: Yomiuri Giants (1998–2005); Chunichi Dragons (2006–2014); As coach: Ehime Mandarin Pirates (2019–2020); Mitsubishi Heavy Industries (2021); Chunichi Dragons (2022-2025)

Kohei Oda (小田 幸平, born March 15, 1977) is a Japanese former professional baseball catcher in Japan's Nippon Professional Baseball. He played with the Yomiuri Giants from 1998 to 2005 and for the Chunichi Dragons from 2006 to 2014.
