= Takenori Daita =

Japanese baseball player and coach

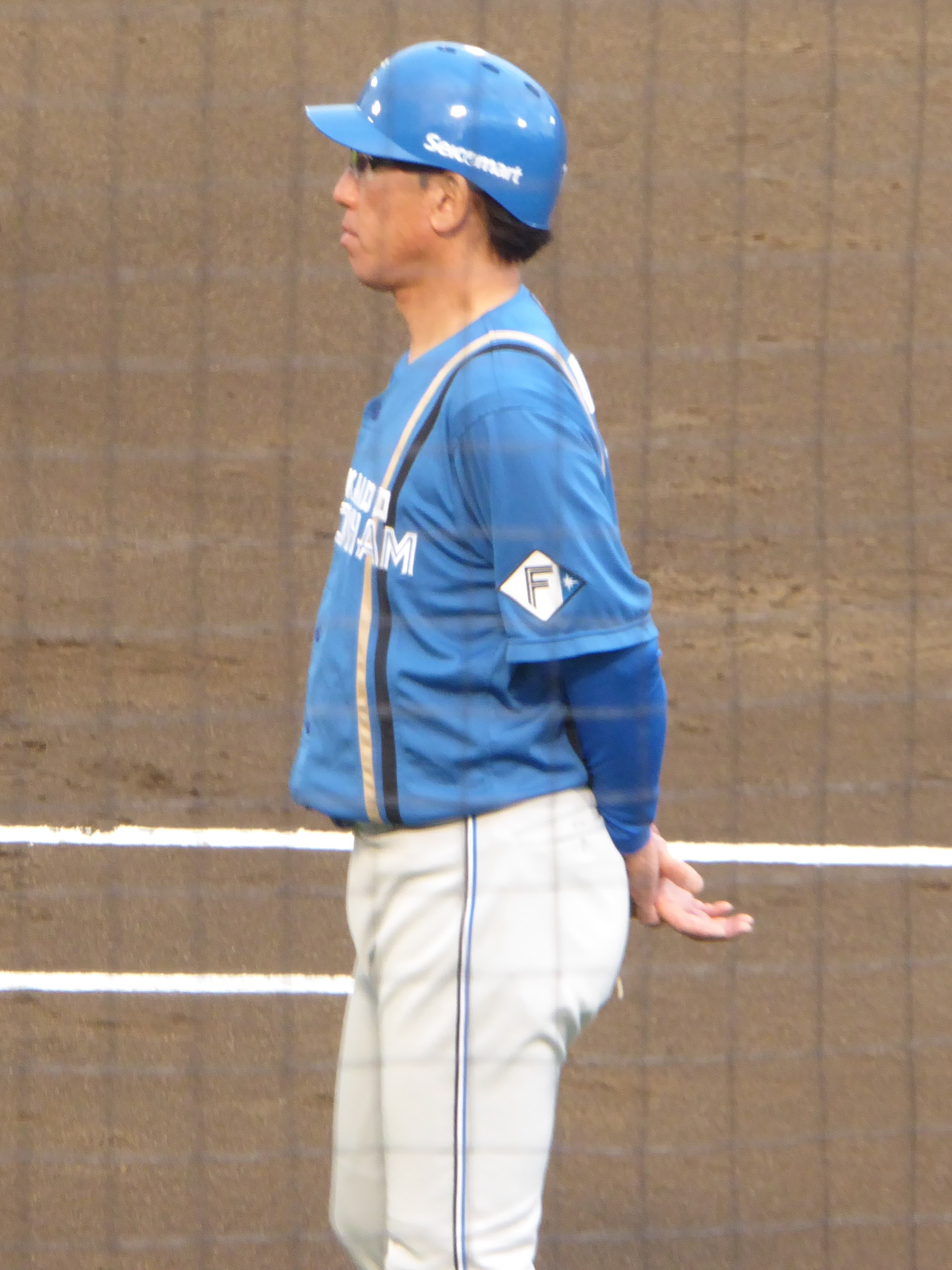
- Outfielder / Coach
- Born: February 11, 1974 (age 51); Yokohama, Kanagawa, Japan
- Batted: Both Threw: Right

NPB debut
- April 22, 1998, for the Kintetsu Buffaloes

Last NPB appearance
- July 1, 2008, for the Chiba Lotte Marines

NPB statistics (through 2008)
- Batting average: .165
- Home runs: 0
- Hits: 18
- Runs batted in: 6
- Stolen base: 25

Teams
- As player: Kintetsu Buffaloes/Osaka Kintetsu Buffaloes (1998–2000); Yakult Swallows (2000–2002); Chiba Lotte Marines (2003, 2005–2008); As coach: Chiba Lotte Marines (2009–2010); Hokkaido Nippon Ham Fighters (2023-2025)
- Last updated on: 9 January 2023

Takenori Daita (代田 建紀, Daita Takenori; born February 4, 1974) is a former baseball player from Japan. He played for the Chiba Lotte Marines, Yakult Swallows, Osaka Kintetsu Buffaloes and many other teams of the Japan Pacific League.
