= Shigeru Sugishita =

Japanese baseball player and manager (1925–2023)

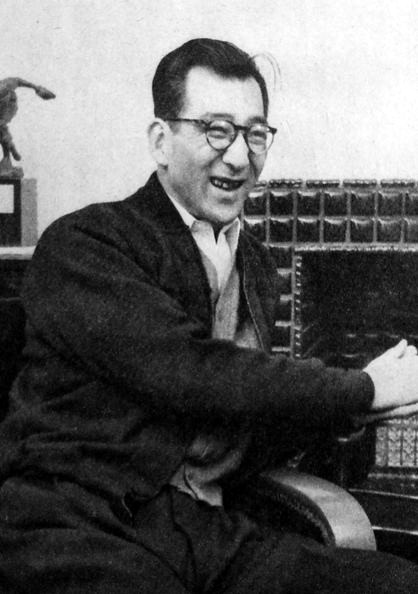
- Pitcher
- Born: September 17, 1925; Tokyo Prefecture, Japan
- Died: June 12, 2023 (aged 97); Tokyo Prefecture, Japan
- Batted: Right Threw: Right

JBL debut
- April 3, 1949, for the Chunichi/Nagoya Dragons

Last NPB appearance
- October 1, 1961, for the Daimai Orions

NPB statistics
- Win–loss: 215–123
- Winning percentage: .636
- Earned run average: 2.23
- Strikeouts: 1,761

Teams
- As player: Chunichi/Nagoya Dragons (1949–1958); Daimai Orions (1961); As manager: Chunichi Dragons (1959–1960, 1968); Hanshin Tigers (1966)

Career highlights and awards
- Japanese Triple Crown (1954); 3x Eiji Sawamura Award (1951, 1952, 1954); Central League MVP (1954); Japan Series MVP (1954); Pitched a no-hitter on May 10, 1955

Member of the Japanese

Baseball Hall of Fame
- Induction: 1985

Shigeru Sugishita (杉下 茂, Sugishita Shigeru; September 17, 1925 – June 12, 2023) was a Japanese professional baseball pitcher and coach. Renowned for his forkball, Sugishita dominated the Central League from 1950–1955, winning more than 30 games twice (winning at least 23 games each season), and garnering three Eiji Sawamura Awards. Sugishita usually split his time between starting games and pitching in relief. He played 11 seasons, ten of them for the Chunichi/Nagoya Dragons.

== Biography ==
Born in Tokyo Prefecture, Sugishita attended Teikyo Shogyo High School and Meiji University.

In 1950, Sugishita led the Central League in strikeouts and innings pitched. In 1951, he went 28-13 with a 2.36 ERA, leading the Central League in victories and winning his first Eiji Sawamura Award. 1952 was another stellar campaign for Sugishita, as he went 32-14 with a 2.33 ERA, pitching in 61 games and throwing 355 2/3 innings. That year he again won the Sawamura Award.

In 1954, Sugishita won his third Sawamura Award, going 32-12 with a 1.39 ERA. He pitched 395 1/3 innings, had 27 complete games, 7 shutouts, and 273 strikeouts, and was named Most Valuable Player of the Central League. Capping off the season, he was the MVP of 1954 Japan Series, pitching in four of the seven games and winning three of them, including the game-seven clincher. He is one of only three players in NPB history to win the Sawamura Award, the MVP award, and the Japan Series MVP in the same season.

Despite only being 32 years old, Sugishita retired from playing after the 1958 season and became the Dragons' manager. After guiding the team for two seasons, Sugishita was let go after the 1960 season, when the Dragons finished in fifth place.

In 1961, Sugishita returned to playing, pitching mostly in relief for the Daimai Orions. He went 4-6 with a respectable 2.44 ERA.

Sugishita went back to managing, leading the Hanshin Tigers in 1966 (where he was fired after 86 games) and returning to Chunichi in 1968 (where he was fired after 59 games). His teams did not perform well, and Sugishita moved on to announcing baseball on television.

Shigeru Sugishita was elected to the Japanese Baseball Hall of Fame in 1985.

Sugishita died of pneumonia at a Tokyo hospital on June 12, 2023, at the age of 97.
