= Yudai Deguchi =

Japanese baseball player (born 1971)

- Outfielder
- Born: September 23, 1971 (age 54); Amagasaki, Hyōgo, Japan
- Batted: Right Threw: Right

NPB debut
- 1990, for the Yomiuri Giants

Last NPB appearance
- 2005, for the Fukuoka Daiei Hawks

NPB statistics
- Batting average: .236
- Home runs: 13
- Runs batted in: 68
- Stats at Baseball Reference

Teams
- Yomiuri Giants (1990–1998); Fukuoka Daiei Hawks/Fukuoka SoftBank Hawks (1999–2005)

Yudai Deguchi (出口 雄大, Deguchi Yūdai; born September 23, 1971) is a Japanese former professional baseball outfielder. He played in Nippon Professional Baseball (NPB) for the Yomiuri Giants and Fukuoka Daiei Hawks from 1990 to 2005.
