= Tetsugyu Soin Ban =

Japanese Soto Zen Master

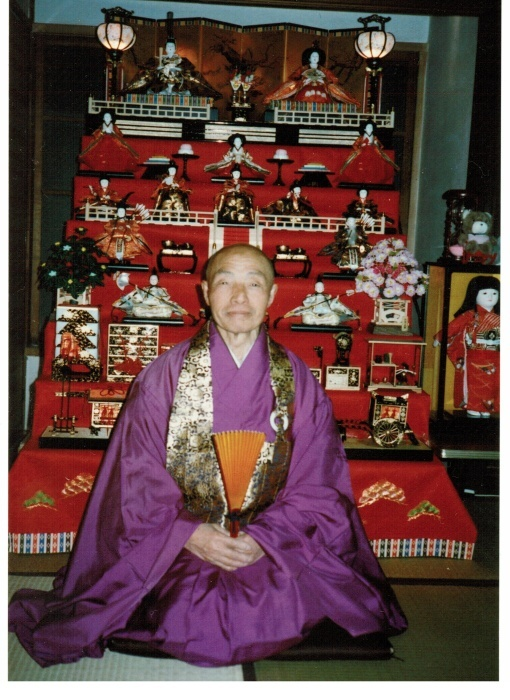
Ban Tetsugyu Soin Hanamaki, 1910; Tokyo, 1996

Tetsugyu Soin Ban (伴 鉄牛 (Ban Tetsugyu)祖印 (soin); 4 June 1910 – 21 January 1996) was a Japanese Zen master. He was a disciple of the Soto Zen Master Harada Daiun Sogaku, one of the first Zen teachers to open Zen doctrine to western students.

== Biography ==
Tetsugyu Soin Ban was ordained as a Soto Zen monk in 1917, Fuchizawa, by Zen master Chimyo Tanzawa.

From 1931 to 1938 Ban trained at Hosshin-ji Monastery under Daiun Sogaku Harada, inheriting the Zen style of teaching that combines the Rinzai Zen use of koans with Soto Zen forms. Subsequently, Ban studied at Komazawa University, where he graduated in 1941.

In 1947 Tetsugyu Ban became Tanto, or Head of Practice, of Hosshin-ji Monastery. One year later, he held the same position at Hoon-ji, a Rinzai temple in Kyoto. Ban received Dharma transmission from Harada Daiun Sogaku and founded the Soto Zen temple Tosho-ji, in Tokyo. In the following years, Ban also founded the Soto Zen temples Kannon-ji, in Iwate Prefecture and Tetsugyu-ji, in Oita Prefecture.

Tetsugyu Ban was one of the first Zen masters to open the doors of the Japanese Zen monastery to European and American disciples. One well-known disciple was Maura Soshin O'Halloran, an Irish-American Buddhist nun who wrote about Zen training at Kannon-ji and Tosho-ji in her diary Pure Heart, Enlightened Mind, in which she refers to Ban Roshi with the honorific title "Go-Roshi." Another disciple is the American Zen teacher Paul Tesshin Silverman, who, succeeded Tetsugyu Ban as the abbot of Tetsugyu-ji in 1993, becoming the first western abbot of a Japanese monastery.

It was Roshi Ban Tetsugyu who suggested to Chinese Chan Master Sheng Yen in the 1970s that he go to teach in America, which he did in 1975 - see Sheng Yen's Getting the Buddha Mind.

Tetsugyu Soin died on January 21, 1996, after a life dedicated to spreading Zen in Japan and beyond.

== Bibliography ==
- Ban, Tetsugyu (December 1947). "Rouhachi-zen no omoide [臘八禪の思い出]" [Memories of the Laba zen]. The Mahayana Zen Buddhism (in Japanese). 24 (11 (263)). Kawabe, Akita Prefecture: Chuo Bukkyosha: 14–15.
- "Namu Hakuun rotaishi [南無白雲老大師]" [Nam Hakuun Roshi]. The Mahayana Zen Buddhism (in Japanese). 50 (8(598)). Kawabe, Akita: Chuo Bukkyosha: 7–9. September 1973.
- "Inochi no kotoba: Doshin to ishoku [いのちの言葉 道心と衣食]" [Life and words: Bodhicitta and clothing/food]. Zaike Bukkyō (in Japanese) (301). Zaike Bukkyo Kyokai: 64–65. April 1979. ISSN 0911-7989.
- "Inochi no kobota: shi no hitokoto wo mamoru [いのちの言葉 師の一言を守る]" [Life and words: Keeping to your master's words]. Zaike Bukkyō (in Japanese) (320). Zaike Bukkyo Kyokai: 55. November 1980. ISSN 0911-7989.

== Sources ==
- O'Halloran, Maura Soshin; O'Halloran, Ruth (Introduction) (April 2007). Pure Heart, Enlightened Mind: The Life and Letters of an Irish Zen Saint. Beth O'Halloran (Illustration). Wisdom Publications. ISBN 9780861712830.
- Sheng Yen (1982) Getting the Buddha Mind. New York: Dharma Drum Publications
