= Michio Nishizawa =

Japanese baseball player (1921–1977)

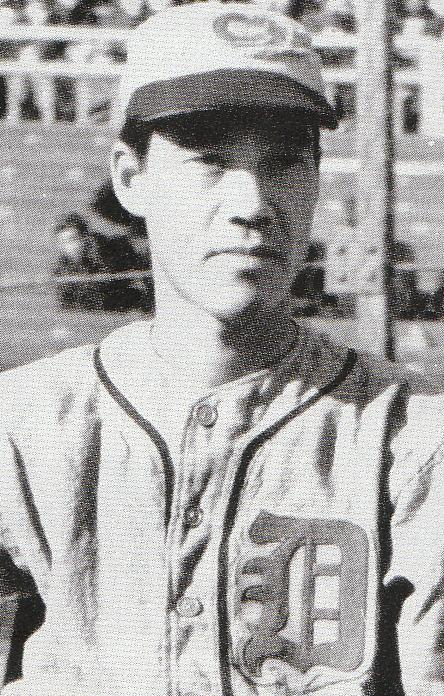
- Nishizawa in 1949

Chunichi Dragons – No. 15
- Pitcher, First baseman
- Born: September 1, 1921; Tokyo, Japan
- Died: December 18, 1977 (aged 56)
- Batted: Right Threw: Right

JBL debut
- 1936, for the Nagoya Club

Last NPB appearance
- 1958, for the Chunichi Dragons

NPB statistics
- Win–loss: 60-65
- ERA: 2.23
- Strikeouts: 404

NPB statistics
- Batting average: .286
- Home runs: 212
- RBI: 940
- Stats at Baseball Reference

Teams
- Nagoya Club/Sangyo/Chubu Nihon (1936–1946); Gold Star/Kinsei Stars (1946–1948); Nagoya Dragons/Chunichi Dragons (1949–1958)

Career highlights and awards
- 5x All Star (1951, 1952, 1953, 1954, 1955); 3x Best Nine Award-winner (1950, 1952, 1954); Pitched a no-hitter on July 18, 1942; Led league in batting average: 1952 (.353); Led league in slugging percentage: 1953 (.545); Led league in runs batted in: 1952 (98); Led League in total bases: 1952 (242), 1954 (254); Hit five grand slams in 1950; Chunichi Dragons #15 retired

Member of the Japanese

Baseball Hall of Fame
- Induction: 1977

Michio Nishizawa (西澤 道夫; September 1, 1921 – December 18, 1977) was a prominent Japanese Nippon Professional Baseball player who excelled as both a pitcher and a position player. Playing with the Chunichi Dragons franchise for most of his career, Nishizawa became one of Japan's most beloved athletes. His number 15 jersey is one of only two retired by the team.

== Biography ==
Nishizawa debuted with Nagoya at the age of 15 in 1936, the youngest player ever in the history of pro Yakyu.

He achieved early fame as a pitcher, developing into a twenty-game winner by 1939. His most memorable pitching feats occurred in 1942. On May 24 of that year, Nishizawa pitched a remarkable twenty-eight complete innings, totalling 311 pitches in a 4-4 tie against the Taiyō Baseball Club at Korakuen Stadium. Later that year, he tossed his first and only no-hitter, accomplishing the feat against the Hankyu Baseball Club.

Despite a career earned run average of 2.23, the heavy workload combined with injuries sustained during two years of service in World War II forced him to switch positions to first base, and later the outfield. He didn't pitch again after 1947 (while his playing career continued through 1958). Nishizawa was traded mid-season 1946 to Gold Star (later known as the Kinsei Stars), playing with that franchise through the 1948 season. He rejoined the Dragons in 1949.

After early struggles with the bat, Nishizawa developed into a feared hitter. He swatted a then-league record 46 home runs in 1950. His best season came in 1952, when he led the league in both batting average and runs batted in. Two years later, Nishizawa led the Dragons to the 1954 Central League title, breaking an eight-year run by the Yomiuri Giants.

He played his final game in 1958, but went on to manage Chunichi. The Dragons compiled a 253-217-10 record in Nishizawa's four seasons at the helm (1964–1967).

He was elected to the Japanese Baseball Hall of Fame in 1977 despite the lackluster state of the Chunichi Dragons throughout much of his career.

After he entered a professional baseball career, he graduated from Nihon University.
