= Chunichi Dragons =

Professional baseball team in the Central League of Nippon Professional Baseball

- 中日ドラゴンズ

Logo	Cap insignia

Information
- League: Nippon Professional Baseball Central League (1950–present) Japanese Baseball League (1936–1949)
- Location: Higashi-ku, Nagoya, Aichi, Japan
- Ballpark: Vantelin Dome Nagoya
- Founded: January 15, 1936; 90 years ago
- Nickname(s): Ryu (竜, dragon)
- Japan Series championships: 2 (1954, 2007)
- CL pennants: 9 (1954, 1974, 1982, 1988, 1999, 2004, 2006, 2010, 2011)
- Playoff berths: 6 (2007, 2008, 2009, 2010, 2011, 2012)
- Former name: Nagoya Dragons (1951–1953); Chunichi Dragons (1948–1950); Chubu Nippon Dragons (1947); Chubu Nippon (1946); Sangyo Club (1944); Nagoya Club (1936–1943)
- Former ballparks: Nagoya Stadium (1949–1996); Korakuen Stadium (1948)
- Colors: Blue, Red and White
- Mascot: Doala, Shaolon, and Paolon
- Retired numbers: 10; 15
- Ownership: Uichirō Ōshima
- Management: Chunichi Shimbun Co., Ltd
- Manager: Kimiyasu Kudoh
- Website: https://dragons.jp/

Current uniforms

The Chunichi Dragons (中日ドラゴンズ, Chūnichi Doragonzu) are a professional baseball team based in Nagoya, the chief city in the Chūbu region of Japan. The team plays in the Central League of Nippon Professional Baseball. They have won the Central League pennant nine times (most recently in 2011) and the Japan Series twice (in 1954 and 2007). They were also champions in the 2007 Asia Series.

Through 2026, the franchise's all-time record is 5,702–5,512–391 (.508). The team's current manager is Kimiyasu Kudoh.

== Franchise history ==
The Chunichi Dragons were formed in 1936 as the Nagoya Club. The franchise was acquired by the Chunichi Shimbun newspaper company in 1946. They became the "Dragons" in 1947, but experimented with a number of variations on their team name before settling on Chunichi Dragons in 1954.

The Dragons' most famous player, Michio Nishizawa, played for the team from 1936 to 1958. He entered the league as a 15-year-old pitcher. He developed into a 20-game winner by 1939. Nishizawa's most memorable pitching feats occurred in 1942. On May 24 of that year, Nishizawa pitched a remarkable twenty-eight complete innings, totalling 311 pitches in a 4–4 tie against the Taiyō Whales at Korakuen Stadium. Later that year, he tossed his first and only no-hitter, accomplishing the feat against the Hankyu team. Despite a career ERA of 2.22, the heavy workload combined with injuries sustained during two years of service in World War II forced him to switch positions to first base, and later the outfield. After early struggles with the bat, Nishizawa developed into a feared hitter. He swatted a then-league record 46 home runs in 1950. His best season came in 1952, when he led the league in both batting average and runs batted in. Altogether, Nishizawa appeared in five All Star Games and won the Best Nine Award three times.

Forkball-specialist Shigeru Sugishita dominated the Central League for the Dragons from 1950 to 1955, winning more than 30 games twice (winning at least 23 games each season), and garnering three Eiji Sawamura Awards.

Led by Sugishita and an aging Nishizawa, the Dragons won their first Japan Series championship in 1954, defeating the Nishitetsu Lions 4-games-to-3.

In 1962, the Dragons became one of the first NPB teams to sign established MLB players when they brought on former stars Larry Doby and Don Newcombe.

Michio Nishizawa went on to manage the team from 1964 to 1967. He was elected to the Japanese Baseball Hall of Fame in 1977 and his number 15 jersey is one of only two retired by the team.

The Dragons were the first Japanese team to hire a foreigner as manager, Wally Yonamine, who led the team from 1972 to 1977. (Yonamine spoke fluent Japanese, and was later elected to the Japanese Baseball Hall of Fame.)

In 1974, the team won the Central League title for the first time in 20 years, and this victory stopped the Yomiuri Giants from winning the league for the tenth consecutive year. Another league title came in 1999, and in that year, Dragons set a record by winning 11 consecutive games at the opening of the season.

In the 2004 season the team reached the Japan Series, but lost to the Seibu Lions, the Pacific League Champions, and in 2006 they lost the Japan Series to the Hokkaido Nippon Ham Fighters. At that point the team had won the Central League pennant seven times since 1950, but their last Japan Series victory was in 1954, the longest such drought in Nippon Professional Baseball.

=== 2007 Japan Series title ===
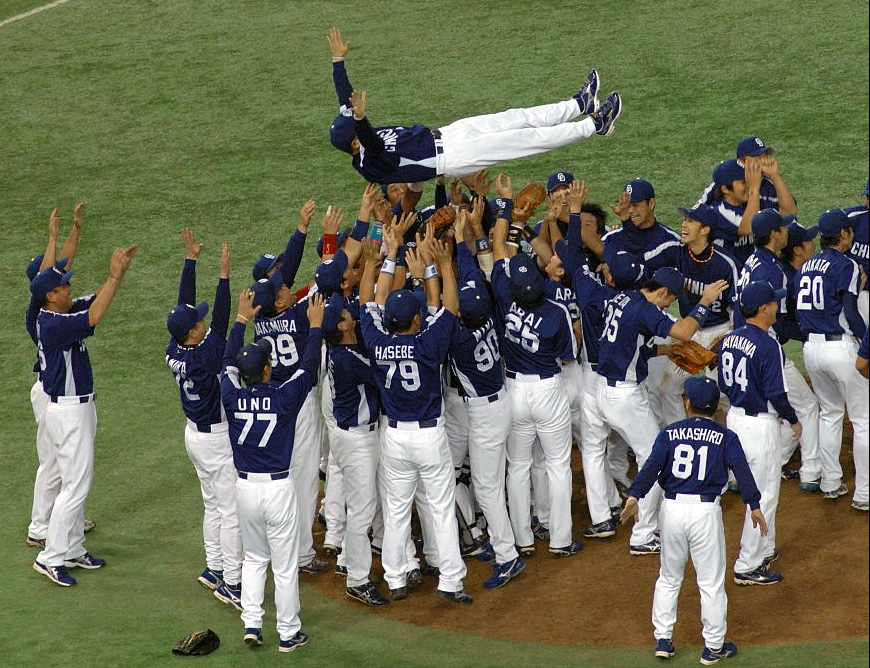
The Chunichi Dragons after winning the 2007 Asia Series title.

In early 2007, the NPB playoff rules were changed: The top team in the league would advance automatically, while the second and third teams in the league would play a best-of-three series. The winner would face the first-place team in a best-of-five series to see who would advance to the Japan Series finals.

The Dragons took advantage of the new playoff system, and after finishing second in the season standings, swept the Hanshin Tigers in a best-of-three series, then, in a huge upset, swept the heavily favoured Yomiuri Giants in a best-of-five series to advance to the Japan Series against the Hokkaido Nippon Ham Fighters. In an exact reversal of the 2006 Japan Series, Hokkaido won game 1 of the series, but the Dragons won the next four straight games, including a combined perfect game from Daisuke Yamai and star closer Hitoki Iwase in the deciding Game 5, to become the 2007 Japan Series Champions, ending 53 years of frustration and the longest Japan Series drought in NPB history. The Japan Series victory allowed the Dragons to advance to the 2007 Asia Series, in which they went 2–1 in the round robin, then defeated the SK Wyverns, 6–5.

=== Since the 2007 Japan Series title ===
Three years later, they faced the Chiba Lotte Marines in the 2010 Japan Series, but lost to the Marines in seven games, including a 2–2 tie in the longest Japan Series game ever, which lasted 15 innings. A year later, the Dragons were back in the 2011 Japan Series, but fell to the Fukuoka SoftBank Hawks in seven games. In 2012, they made the Central League Climax Series, by first defeating the Tokyo Yakult Swallows in 3 games in the first stage, but lost to the eventual Japan Series champion Yomiuri Giants in 6 games in the final stage, while the Giants also had a 1-game advantage. As of 2022, this was the last time the Dragons made the playoffs; they have had only one winning season since, which came in the pandemic-abbreviated 2020 season.

To celebrate its 90th anniversary, the team sponsored matches during the 2026 July sumo tournament. To mark the ninth decade, the sponsored matches were the ninth matches of each day.

== Franchise regular season record ==
Season	GP	W	L	T	%	GB	Finish	Playoffs
2016	143	58	82	3	.414	30.5	6th, Central	Did not qualify
2017	143	59	79	5	.428	28.5	5th, Central	Did not qualify
2018	143	63	78	2	.447	19.0	5th, Central	Did not qualify
2019	143	68	73	2	.482	9.0	5th, Central	Did not qualify
2020	120	60	55	5	.522	8.5	2nd, Central	Did not qualify
2021	143	55	71	17	.437	18.5	5th, Central	Did not qualify
2022	143	66	75	2	.468	15.0	6th, Central	Did not qualify
2023	143	56	82	5	.406	29.0	6th, Central	Did not qualify
2024	143	60	75	8	.444	16.5	6th, Central	Did not qualify
2025	143	63	78	2	.447	23.0	4th, Central	Did not qualify

== Uniforms ==
The Dragons uniforms were based on the Brooklyn Dodgers. The team's colors (blue and white) are the same colors worn by the Dodgers (both in Brooklyn and Los Angeles). From the late 1980s to the mid-1990s, the stylized lettering on the Dragons' jerseys and caps was virtually identical to the Dodgers' uniforms during that same period.

== Current roster ==
Chunichi Dragons roster
First team		Second team
Pitchers: 17 Yūya Yanagi; 19 Hiroto Takahashi; 20 Hideaki Wakui; 21 Yumeto Kanemaru; 22 Yūdai Ōno; 26 Reia Nakachi; 30 Akira Neo; 47 Seiya Yoshida; 54 Kento Fujishima; 59 Kōki Saitō; 68 Kenshin Makino; 70 Ren Kondo; 90 Shinya Matsuyama; 91 Humberto Mejía; Catchers: 35 Takuya Kinoshita; 49 Takuma Katō	Infielders: 0 Rintarō Tsujimoto; 2 Mikiya Tanaka; 3 Shūhei Takahashi; 5 Kaito Muramatsu; 7 Hiroki Fukunaga; 23 Miguel Sanó; 48 Toshiki Abe; 63 Yutaro Itayama; 65 Naoto Chino; Outfielders: 8 Yōhei Ōshima; 24 Jason Vosler; 55 Seiya Hosokawa; 57 Asahi Hanada; Manager: 99 Kazuki Inoue; Coaches: 83 Daisuke Yamai (pitching); 82 Takuya Asao (pitching); 72 Shōta Ōno (battery); 74 Yuji Iiyama (position player coordinator); 89 Nobuhiko Matsunaka (hitting coordinator); 78 Masahiko Morino (hitting/strategy); 71 Naomichi Donoue (infield defense); 87 Yutaka Nakamura (outfield defense); 76 Akinori Ōtsuka (roving pitching/development)	Pitchers: 11 Masaki Nakanishi; 13 Yūki Hashimoto; 14 Shō Kusaka; 16 Yoshinori Sakurai; 28 Albert Abreu; 29 Yūta Matsukihira; 32 Mao Itoh; 33 Toshihiro Sugiura; 34 Hiroto Fuku; 36 Kōnosuke Fukuda; 38 Takahiro Matsuba; 41 Akiyoshi Katsuno; 46 Yūgo Umeno; 50 Tatsuya Shimizu; 52 Kunitada Shinozaki; 53 Haruki Miyauchi; 61 Kōsuke Takahashi; 62 Hiroto Mori; 64 Keito Arima; 69 Mizuki Miura; 93 Kyle Muller; Catchers: 9 Yuta Ishii; 39 Shingo Usami; 43 Taisei Miya; 58 Kōta Ishibashi	Infielders: 4 Orlando Calixte; 25 Takaya Ishikawa; 31 Shunta Mori; 45 Ryūku Tsuchida; 60 Yasuhiro Yamamoto; 56 Mao Shimpo; 95 Christián Rodríguez; 97 Seishū Higuchi; Outfielders: 00 Gōki Oda; 1 Yūki Okabayashi; 42 Kenta Bright; 44 Seiji Kawagoe; 51 Seiji Uebayashi; 66 Kōsuke Ukai; 67 Kiramu Noto; Manager: 88 Eiji Ochiai; Coaches: 77 Shinichirō Koyama (pitching coordinator); 98 Shinji Tajima (pitching); 84 Nobumasa Fukuda (hitting); 78 Masaaki Koike (hitting coordinator); 80 Kōhei Oda (battery); 81 Yūto Morikoshi (infield defense); 88 Ryōsuke Hirata (outfield defense); 85 Hiroyuki Watanabe (position player development); 86 Masato Kobayashi (pitching/development)
Development Players
202 Naiki Nakamura (IF); 203 Kenya Inoue (P); 205 Shōta Habu (P); 206 Ryūnosuke Yamaasa (C); 207 Keishi Tsuda (IF); 209 Yūma Fukumoto (OF); 211 Kōdai Umetsu (P); 213 Akio Moriyama (P); 216 Taiga Ishikawa (IF); 217 Aisuke Mikami (OF); 218 Rii Kawakami (IF); 219 Randy Martínez (P)
Updated April 13, 2026		→ All NPB rosters

== Baseball Hall of Famers ==
The following Hall of Famers played, coached and/or managed for the Dragons, and are listed with the years they were with the club.

=== Japanese Baseball Hall of Fame ===
- (Japan) Yutaka Ikeda (池田 豊) (1936)
- (Japan) Daisuke Miyake (三宅 大輔) (1944)
- (Japan) Shunichi Amachi (天知 俊一) (1949–1958)
- (Japan) Tokuro Konishi (小西 得郎) (1939–1941)
- (Japan) Shuichi Ishimoto (石本 秀一) (1961–1962)
- (Japan) Hideo Fujimoto (藤本 英雄) (1947)
- (Japan) Shigeru Mizuhara (水原 茂) (1969–1971)
- (Japan) Michio Nishizawa (西澤 道夫) (1947–1950, 1954–1958, 1963–1968)
- (Japan) Makoto Kozuru (小鶴 誠) (1942–1943, 1946–1947)
- (Japan) Shigeru Sugishita (杉下 茂) (1949–1958, 1959–1960, 1968)
- (Japan) Minoru Yamashita (山下 実) (1942)
- (Japan) Shigeru Makino (牧野 茂 ) (1952–1959)
- (Japan) Michinori Tsubouchi (坪内 道則) (1949–1951, 1950, 1954, 1957–1958, 1952–1953)
- (Japan) Kazuhisa Inao (稲尾 和久) (1978–1980)
- (United States) Wally Yonamine (与那嶺 要) (1961–1962, 1963–1966, 1970–1977)
- (Japan) Sadao Kondo (近藤 貞雄) (1948–1954, 1953, 1955–1962, 1964–1968, 1972–1976, 1981–1983)
- (Japan) Ryohei Hasegawa (長谷川 良平) (1968–1970)
- (Japan) Kazuhiro Yamauchi (山内 一弘) (1984–1986)
- (Japan) Kenjiro Tamiya (田宮 謙次郎) (1968–1969)
- (Japan) Morimichi Takagi (髙木 守道) (1960–1986, 1992–1995, 2012–2013)
- (Japan) Hisashi Yamada (山田 久志) (1999–2003)
- (Japan) Takao Kajimoto (梶本 隆夫) (1998–1999)
- (Japan) Shinichi Eto (江藤 愼一) (1959–1974)
- (Japan) Hiromitsu Ochiai (落合 博満) (1987–1993, 2004–2011, 2013–2016)
- (Japan) Senichi Hoshino (星野 仙一) (1969–1982, 1987–1991, 1996–2001)
- (Japan) Kazuyoshi Tatsunami (立浪 和義) (1988–2009)
- (Japan) Hiroshi Gondoh (権藤 博) (1961–1968, 1973–1980, 2012)

=== American Baseball Hall of Fame ===
- (United States) Larry Doby (1962)

== Retired numbers ==
- 10 (Japan) Tsuguhiro Hattori (服部 受弘)
- 15 (Japan) Michio Nishizawa (西澤 道夫)

== MLB players ==
Active:

- Shinnosuke Ogasawara (2025–present)
- Yariel Rodríguez (2020–2022)

Retired:

- Willie Davis (1977)
- Larry Doby (1962)
- Don Newcombe (1962)
- Bob Nieman (1963)
- Vance Law (1990)
- Alonzo Powell (1992–1997)
- Matt Stairs (1993)
- Darnell Coles (1996)
- Samson Lee (2000)
- Akinori Otsuka (2003–2007)
- Kenshin Kawakami (2009–2010)
- Kosuke Fukudome (2008–2012)
- Matt Clark (2013)
- Joely Rodriguez (2018–2019)
- Chen Wei-Yin (2004–2011, 2020–2021)

== In popular culture ==
- The Dragons became known to audiences in the U.S. through the 1992 movie Mr. Baseball, starring Tom Selleck and Ken Takakura. The film is based around a difficult season in the career of aging New York Yankees first baseman Jack Elliot (Selleck), who is traded to the Chunichi Dragons during spring training, and is forced to deal with high expectations and cultural differences during the Dragons' pennant run.
- In Haruki Murakami's 2002 novel Kafka on the Shore, one of the characters, Hoshino, is a devoted fan of the Chunichi Dragons, wearing the team's cap everywhere he goes.
- In 2009 a Wii game aimed at children, Doala de Wii, was released. The game is based on the team mascot "Doala".
- The 2012 video game Yakuza 5 features a team called the "Nagoya Wyverns", which is a reference to the Dragons. Tatsuo Shinada, one of the main characters, briefly played for the team, and it features heavily in the game's plot.

== Mascots ==
The team has three mascots, Doala, Shaolon, and Paolon. Doala is the main mascot of the team, and he was introduced in 1994, replacing their former mascot, Gaburi. Doala is a koala because Nagoya was home to Japan's first koala due to its sister city status with Sydney. Doala is quite known for his stunts. Shaolon is the team's second mascot and was introduced in 1997. He is a blue dragon and he has appeared on the logo for a long while now. Paolon is the team's third mascot and she was introduced in 2000. She is a pink dragon.
