= 2010 Nippon Professional Baseball draft =

2010 Nippon Professional Baseball Draft
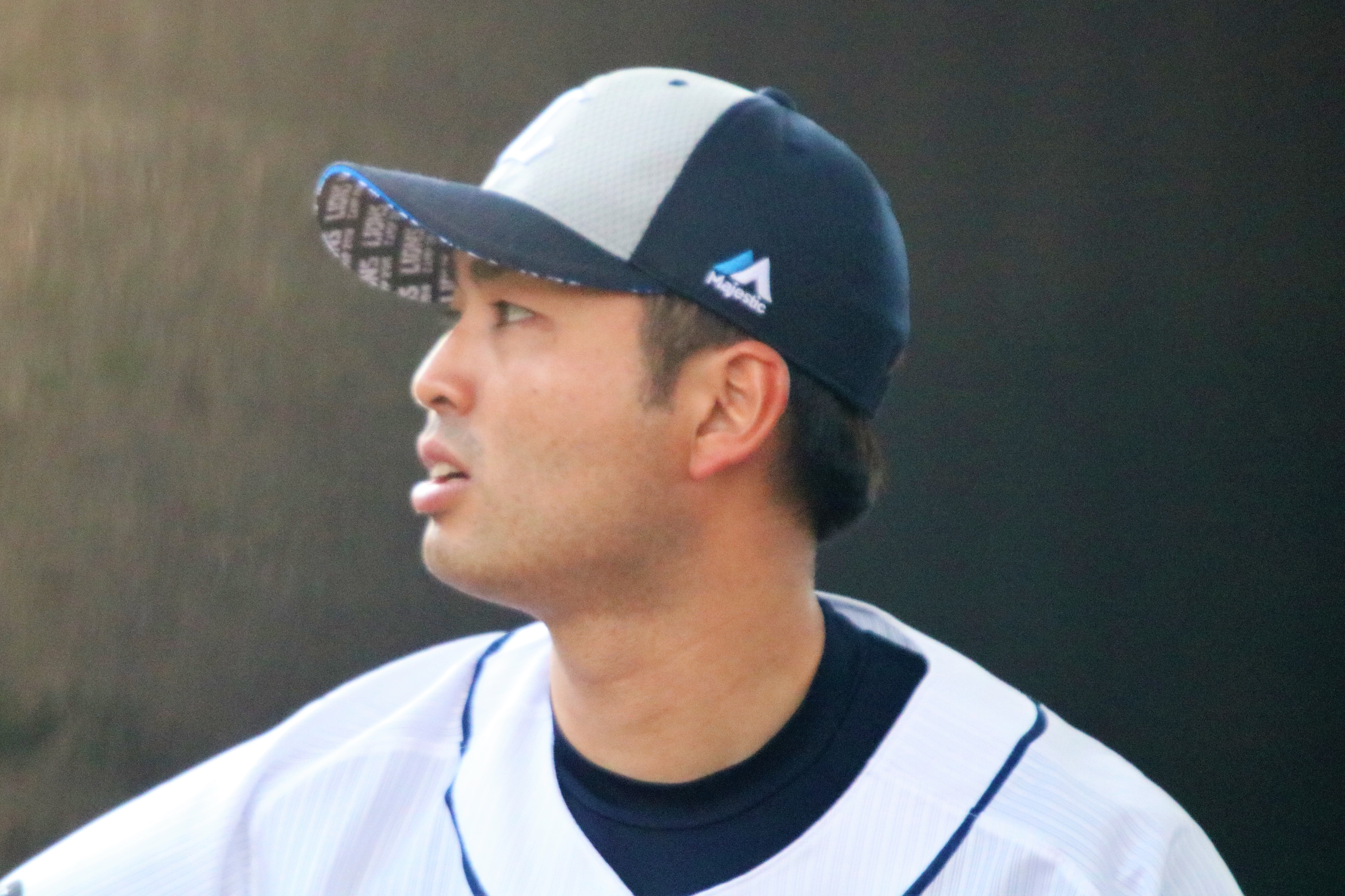
- Tatsuya Oishi, who was nominated and bid lottery for by six teams.

General information
- Sport: Baseball
- Date: October 28, 2010
- Location: Grand Prince Hotel Takanawa, Tokyo
- Networks: TBS (first round), sky-A
- Sponsored by: Toshiba

Overview
- 97 total selections in 16 (Includes draft for developmental players) rounds
- League: Nippon Professional Baseball
- First round selections: Tatsuya Oishi; Yuki Saito

The 2010 Nippon Professional Baseball (NPB) Draft was held on October 28, 2010, for the 46th time at the Grand Prince Hotel Takanawa to assign amateur baseball players to the NPB. It was arranged with the special cooperation of Toshiba with official naming rights. The draft was officially called "The Professional Baseball Draft Meeting supported by TOSHIBA ".It has been sponsored by Toshiba for the 2nd consecutive year since 2009.

== Summary ==
Only the first round picks will be done by bid lottery. After the second round, waver selections were made in order from the lowest-ranked team of the 2011 season in both the Central League and Pacific League, the third round was reversed and selections were made from the top team, and the fourth round was reversed again, alternating with selections from the lowest-ranked team until all teams had finished selecting players.

Since the 2005 season, the winner of the NPB All-Star Game has determined whether the Central League or the Pacific League gets waiver preference after the second round. In the 2010 All-Star Game, the Central League and Pacific League had a 1-1-1 tie, but regulations gave the Central League waiver priority over the Pacific League.

Attention was focused on candidates such as Tatsuya Oishi, Yuki Saito, Hirokazu Sawamura, and other college-age right-handed pitchers. Under the circumstances, the Yomiuri Giants publicly announced that they would pick Sawamura in the first round, and Sawamura also expressed his refusal to negotiate if he was picked by a team other than the Giants. As a result, other teams backed away from Sawamura, and the Giants picked him alone. The Giants' approach was criticized.

== First Round Contested Picks ==
	Player name	Position	Teams selected by
First Round	**Tatsuya Oishi**	Pitcher	Baystars, Eagles, Carp, Buffaloes, Tigers, **Lions**
First Round	**Yuki Saito**	Pitcher	Swallows, **Fighters**, Marines, Hawks
Second Round	**Takahiro Shiomi**	Pitcher	**Eagles**, Swallows
Second Round	**Shota Ishimine**	Outfielder	Buffaloes, **Marines**
Thrird Round	**Tetsuto Yamada**	Infielder	Buffaloes, **Swallows**

- **Bolded** teams indicate who won the right to negotiate contract following a lottery.
- In the first round, **Hirokazu Sawamura** (Pitcher) was selected by the **Giants**, and **Yudai Ohno** (Pitcher) by the **Dragons** without a bid lottery.
- In the second round, **Kota Suda** (Pitcher) was selected by the **Baystars**, **Yuya Fukui** (Pitcher) by the **Carp**, **Daiki Enokida** (Pitcher) by the **Tigers**, and **Ayatsugu Yamashita** (Catcher) by the **Hawks** without a bid lottery.
- In the fourth round, the last remaining **Buffaloes** selected **Shunta Gotoh** (Outfielder).
- List of selected players.

== Selected Players ==
Key
*	Player did not sign

- The order of the teams is the order of second round waiver priority.
- **Bolded** After that, a developmental player who contracted as a registered player under control.
- List of selected players.

=== Yokohama Baystars ===
Pick	Player name	Position	Team
#1	Kota Suda	Pitcher	JFE East Japan
#2	Kisho Kagami	Pitcher	Hosei University
#3	Sho Aranami	Outfielder	Toyota
#4	Hiroshi Kobayashi	Pitcher	Osaka Gakuin University
#5	Shinji Ohara	Pitcher	TDK
#6	Hiroyuki Fukuyama	Pitcher	Osaka University of Commerce
#7	Junya Ohara	Infielder	Kagawa Olive Guyners
#8	Kenjiro Tsuruoka	Catcher	Ehime Mandarin Pirates
Developmental Player Draft
#1	Ichiro Matsushita	Catcher	Kansai Gaidai University

=== Tohoku Rakuten Golden Eagles ===
Pick	Player name	Position	Team
#1	Takahiro Shiomi	Pitcher	Hachinohe University
#2	Manabu Mima	Pitcher	Tokyo Gas
#3	Toshihito Abe	Infielder	Tohoku Fukushi University
#4	Aoi Enomoto	Outfielder	Kyushu International University High School
#5	Koki Kanno	Infielder	PL Gakuen High School
Developmental Player Draft
#1	Takahiro Kato	Pitcher	Toyama Thunderbirds
#2	Kengo Kimura	Pitcher	Sendai Ikuei Gakuen High School
#3	**Hayato Kawaguchi**	Outfielder	Shiga Takashima Baseball Club

=== Hiroshima Toyo Carp ===
Pick	Player name	Position	Team
#1	Yuya Fukui	Pitcher	Waseda University
#2	Kyohei Nakamura	Pitcher	Fuji University
#3	Yuki Iwami	Pitcher	Osaka Gas
#4	Masaya Kanemaru	Pitcher	Tokai Rika
#5	Yoshitaka Isomura	Catcher	Chukyo University Chukyo High School
#6	Shota Nakazaki	Pitcher	Nichinan Gakuen High School
#7	Yuki Tsurumoto	Pitcher	Tokushima Indigo Socks
Developmental Player Draft
#1	Kyousuke Yamano	Pitcher	Meiho High School
#2	**Ryosuke Ikenouchi**	Pitcher	Chukyo Gakuin University

=== Orix Buffaloes ===
Pick	Player name	Position	Team
#1	Shunta Gotoh	Outfielder	Maebashi Commercial High School
#2	Taiki Mitsumata	Infielder	Shutoku high school
#3	Yuki Miyazaki	Outfielder	Sega Sammy
#4	Shohei Tsukahara	Pitcher	Tsukuba Shuei High School
#5	Masato Fukae	Outfielder	Akashi Red Soldiers

=== Tokyo Yakult Swallows ===
Pick	Player name	Position	Team
#1	Tetsuto Yamada	Outfielder	Riseisha High School
#2	Yuki Shichijo	Pitcher	Hakuwa Victories
#3	Akihisa Nishida	Catcher	Hokusho High School
#4	Tomoya Matano	Outfielder	Hokusho High School
#5	Kentaro Kyuko	Pitcher	Nippon Paper Industries Ishinomaki
#6	Nariaki Kawasaki	Outfielder	Kumamoto Golden Larks
Developmental Player Draft
#1	Koki Kitano	Outfielder	Kanagawa University
#2	Keisuke Ueno	Pitcher	Kagawa Olive Guyners
#3	Takanori Sato	Outfielder	Sendai Ikuei Gakuen High School

=== Hokkaido Nippon-Ham Fighters ===
Pick	Player name	Position	Team
#1	Yuki Saito	Pitcher	Waseda University
#2	Haruki Nishikawa	Outfielder	Chiben Gakuen Wakayama High School
#3	Masahiro Inui	Pitcher	Toyo University
#4	Yodai Enoshita	Pitcher	Kyushu Sangyo University
#5	Yuya Taniguchi	Outfielder	Aichi Institute of Technology Meiden High School
#6	Masaru Saito	Pitcher	Sega Sammy

=== Yomiuri Giants ===
Pick	Player name	Position	Team
#1	Hirokazu Sawamura	Pitcher	Chuo University
#2	Ryosuke Miyaguni	Pitcher	Itoman High School
#3	Taichi Tanaka	Pitcher	Oita Technical High School
#4	Yuki Koyama	Pitcher	Tenri University
Developmental Player Draft
#1	Ryota Wada	Intfielder	Hiroshima Technical High School
#2	**Keisuke Kishi**	Pitcher	Ehime Mandarin Pirates
#3	Keita Fukuizumi	Pitcher	Kobe 9 Cruise
#4	Takayuki Ogino	Intfielder	Aichi Institute of Technology
#5	Takao Zaizen	Intfielder	Aiden Aikoudai OB BLITZ
#6	Kosuke Naruse	Pitcher	Asahikawa Jitsugyo High School
#7	Hiroto Kawaguchi	Intfielder	Nishitama Club
#8	**Kenichi Marumo**	Outfielder	Osaka University of Economics

=== Chiba Lotte Marines ===
Pick	Player name	Position	Team
#1	Shota Ishimine	Outfielder	Tokai University
#2	Masaki Minami	Pitcher	Rissho University
#3	Atsushi Kobayashi	Pitcher	The 77 Bank
#4	Shota Koike	Catcher	Aoyama Gakuin University
#5	Naoya Emura	Catcher	Osaka Toin High School
#6	Shuhei Fujiya	Pitcher	University of Southern California
Developmental Player Draft
#1	**Shota Kurosawa**	Pitcher	Josai International University
#2	Shogo Yamaguchi	Pitcher	Tachibana Gakuen High School
#3	Junya Ishida	Pitcher	NOMO Baseball Club

=== Hanshin Tigers ===
Pick	Player name	Position	Team
#1	Daiki Enokida	Pitcher	Tokyo Gas
#2	Shinta Hifumi	Pitcher	Tokai University Sagami High School
#3	Masahiro Nakatani	Catcher	Fukuoka Institute of Technology Jyoto High School
#4	Akira Iwamoto	Pitcher	Nanyo Technical High School
#5	Fumiya Araki	Infielder	Meiji University
Developmental Player Draft
#1	Tetsuya Sakaguchi	Infielder	Shirithu Wakayama High School
#2	**Hiroya Shimamoto**	Pitcher	Fukuchiyama Seibi High School
#3	Masaki Anada	Infielder	Minoh Higashi High School

=== Saitama Seibu Lions ===
Pick	Player name	Position	Team
#1	Tatsuya Oishi	Pitcher	Waseda University
#2	Kazuhisa Makita	Pitcher	Nippon Express
#3	Shogo Akiyama	Outfielder	Hachinohe University
#4	Kyohei Maegawa	Pitcher	Hannan University High School
#5	Ryo Hayashizaki	Infielder	Toyo University
#6	Masato Kumashiro	Outfielder	Oji Paper Industries

=== Chunichi Dragons ===
Pick	Player name	Position	Team
#1	Yudai Ohno	Pitcher	Bukkyo University
#2	Daiki Yoshikawa	Infielder	PL Gakuen High School
#3	Yuta Muto	Pitcher	Honda
#4	Yuto Morikoshi	Infielder	Meijo University
#5	Keisuke Seki	Pitcher	Komono high school

=== Fukuoka SoftBank Hawks ===
Pick	Player name	Position	Team
#1	Ayatsugu Yamashita	Catcher	Narashino High School
#2	Yuki Yanagita	Outfielder	Hiroshima University of Economics
#3	Takaki Minami	Pitcher	Urawa Gakuin High School
#4	Daichi Hoshino	Pitcher	Okayama Higashi Commercial High School
#5	Masato Sakata	Pitcher	Yusei High School
Developmental Player Draft
#1	Keisuke Yasuda	Outfielder	Kochi Fighting Dogs
#2	Daiki Nakahara	Infielder	Kagoshima Josai High School
#3	Daichiro Ito	Pitcher	Homare High School
#4	**Kodai Senga**	Pitcher	Gamagori High School
#5	**Taisei Makihara**	Infielder	Johoku High School
#6	**Takuya Kai**	Catcher	Yoshikan High School

Preceded by 2009	Nippon Professional Baseball draft	Succeeded by 2011
