= Shōtarō =

- Gender: Male

Origin
- Origin: Japanese
- Meaning: Different meanings depending on the kanji used

Shōtarō, Shotaro or Shoutarou (written: 正太郎, 昭太郎, 正太朗, 章太郎, 庄太郎, 祥太郎 or 翔太郎) is a masculine Japanese given name. Notable people with the name include:

- Shōtarō Adachi (足立 正太郎; 1901–1995), Japanese photographer
- Shōtarō Akiyama (秋山 庄太郎; 1920–2003), Japanese photographer
- Shotaro Ihata (井畑 翔太郎; born 1987), Japanese footballer
- Shōtarō Ikenami (池波 正太郎; 1923–1990), Japanese writer
- Shōtarō Iribe (入部 正太朗; born 1989), Japanese cyclist
- Shotaro Ishinomori (石ノ森 章太郎; 1938–1998), Japanese manga artist
- Shōtarō Koseki (小関 庄太郎; 1907–2003), Japanese photographer
- Showtaro Morikubo (森久保 祥太郎; born 1974), Japanese voice actor and singer
- Shotaro Mamiya (間宮 祥太朗, born 1993), real name Shotaro Mawatari (馬渡祥太朗), Japanese actor
- Shotaro (rapper), full name Shōtarō Ōsaki (大崎 将太郎; born 2000), Japanese K-pop idol, member of NCT and Riize
- Shōtarō Yasuoka (安岡 章太郎; 1920–2013), Japanese writer
- Regina Shotaro (born 1981), Micronesian sprinter

== See also ==
- 7594 Shotaro, a main-belt asteroid
- Shōta
- Shotacon
