= Kishō =

- Gender: Male

Origin
- Origin: Japanese
- Meaning: Different meanings depending on the kanji used

Kishō, Kisho or Kishou (written: 紀章 or 貴章) is a masculine Japanese given name. Notable people with the name include:

- Kisho Kagami (加賀美 希昇; born 1988), Japanese baseball player
- Kisho Kurokawa (黒川 紀章; 1934–2007), Japanese architect
- Kishō Taniyama (谷山 紀章; born 1975), Japanese voice actor
- Kisho Yano (矢野 貴章; born 1984), Japanese footballer
