= Taiki Mitsumata =

Japanese baseball player

Taiki Mitsumata 三ツ俣 大樹
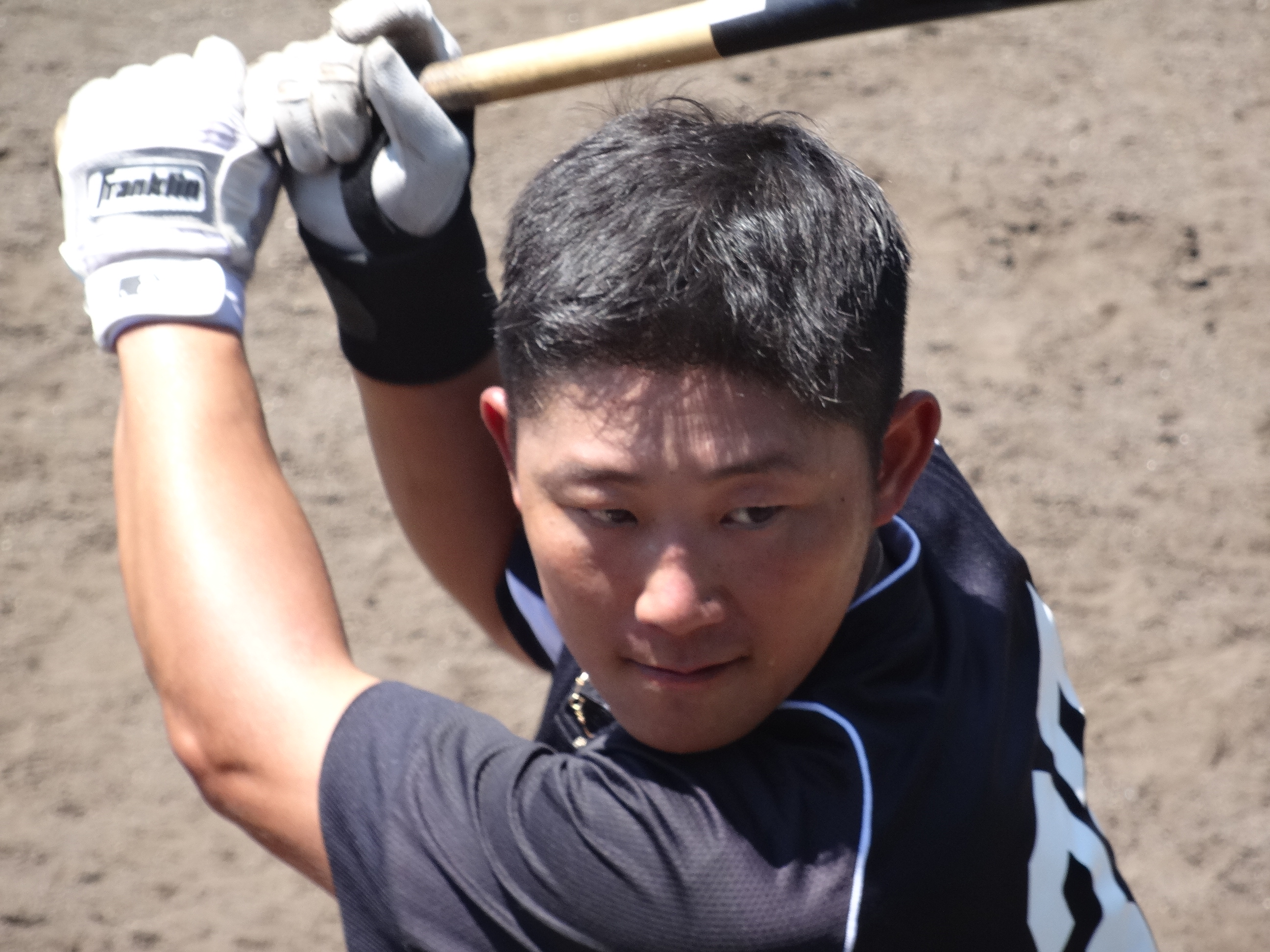
- Infielder
- Born: 11 May 1992 (age 34); Katsushika City, Tokyo, Japan
- Batted: Right Threw: Right

NPB debut
- 8 August, 2012, for the Orix Buffaloes

Last NPB appearance
- 27 September, 2023, for the Tokyo Yakult Swallows

NPB statistics (through 2024 season)
- Batting average: .191
- Home runs: 2
- RBI: 29
- Stats at Baseball Reference

Teams
- Orix Buffaloes (2011–2014); Chunichi Dragons (2014–2022); Tokyo Yakult Swallows (2023–2024)

Taiki Mitsumata (三ツ俣 大樹, Mitusmata Taiki; born May 11, 1992) is a Japanese professional baseball infielder for the Tokyo Yakult Swallows of Nippon Professional Baseball (NPB). He has previously played in NPB for the Orix Buffaloes and Chunichi Dragons.

== Early career ==
As a 6 year old, playing catch with an Akinobu Okada signed ball was his inspiration to start playing baseball where he played for Edogawa South Little Seniors. At Shutoku High School, he played mostly as a pitcher with time spent at short stop where he was the ace and batted 4th. In summer of his junior year he reached the best 8 of the Tokyo tournament while in spring of his senior year he reached the Tokyo tournament semi-finals where he also hit a home run in the second game against Meisei High School. In summer of his senior year he showed great poise in pitching against Kanto Daiichi High School in the tournament final. He also hit a come from behind RBI in the 7th inning. In the 8th inning however due to leg discomfort, he came off the mound where his team went down in a walk-off loss, missing his chance at reaching the Japanese High School Baseball Championship. He hit a total of 18 homeruns in his high school career.

On 28 October 2010, Mitsumata was selected as the 2nd draft pick for the Orix Buffaloes at the 2010 NPB draft and on 21 November signed a provisional contract with a ¥60,000,000 sign-on bonus and a ¥6,000,000 yearly salary.

== Professional career ==
=== Orix Buffaloes ===
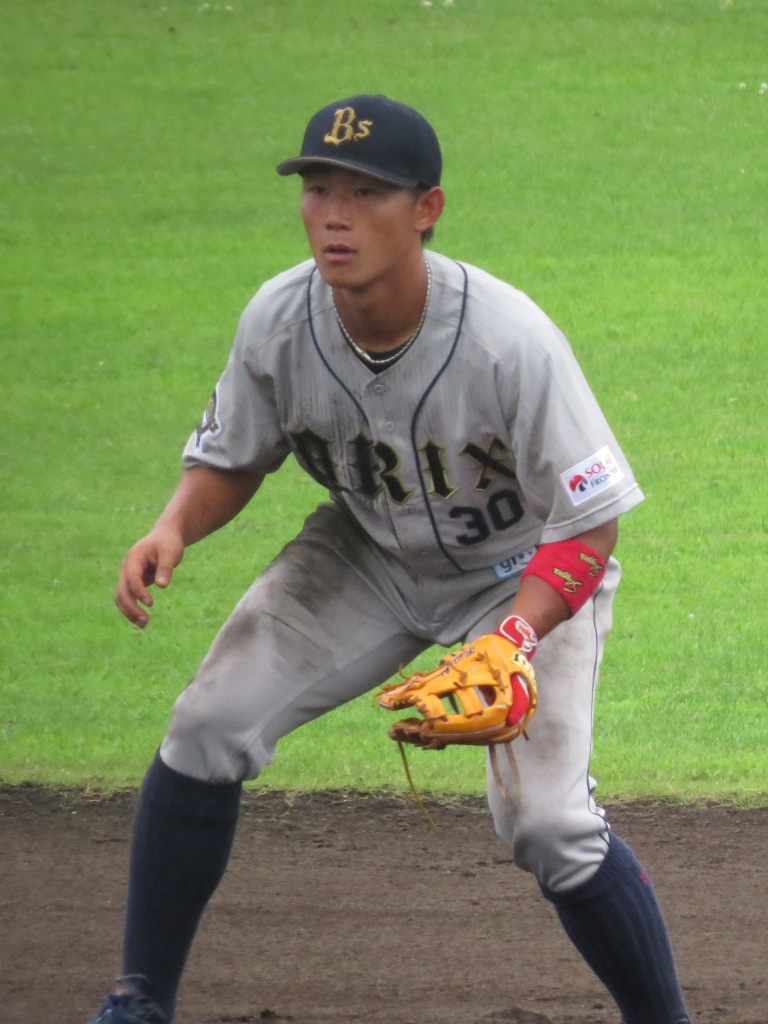
Mitusmata with the Buffaloes in 2013

==== 2011 ====
In his first year with the Buffloes, Mitsumata played in 103 Western League games with a .225 average where he led the league in errors. He also appeared in the 2011 Fresh All Stars Game.

==== 2012 ====
Mitsumata once again played the majority of games on the farm playing in 86 games and hitting .220. On August 7, he was brought up to the first team for the first time and made his debut on the following day. On the 14th of the same month, he was removed from the first team but was re-added in September where on the 22nd in a game against the Chiba Lotte Marines he hit his first professional hit against Takahiro Fujioka in what would turn out to be a multi-hit game. He then hit in 4 consecutive games. He ended the season having played 9 games batting .238.

==== 2013 ====
Mitsumata made limited appearances as a pinch runner or defensive substitution where he played 21 games batting .100.

==== 2014 ====
On 29 July, it was announced that Mitumata was to be traded to the Chunichi Dragons in a 1-to-1 trade with Kyohei Iwasaki.

=== Chunichi Dragons ===
==== 2014 ====
Mitsumata made his Chunichi Dragons debut against the Tokyo Yakult Swallows on 17 August. He later would play against the Hanshin Tigers at Koshien Stadium where he would hit his first professional homerun off of Suguru Iwazaki.

==== 2015 ====
Mitsumata made one first team appearance as a pinch runner and was demoted from the team.

==== 2016 ====
Playing in 15 games batting .125 Mitsumata was once again unable to prove his ability to perform in the top squad and was subsequently demoted once more.

==== 2017 ====
Mitsumata played 68 games batting .227 on the farm team. He would play 8 games for the first team with a single plate appearance.

==== 2018 ====
Mitsumata played 90 games batting .176 in the Western League. He failed to make any first-team appearances. His salary was therefore slashed by ¥1,000,000 to ¥6,000,000 per annum.

== Playing style ==
As a pitcher he was able to throw 149 km/h with a slider. In a practice game in high school he showed off his power hitting a 120-metre homerun off future teammate Shohei Tsukahara where he also showed off his strong arm.
