= Shōta =

Shōta, Shouta, or Shota (しょうた, ショウタ) is a common masculine Japanese given name.

== Written forms ==
Shōta can be written using different kanji characters and can mean:

- 消太, "erase, thick"
- 正太, "correct, thick"
- 翔太, "soar, thick"
- 章太, "composition, thick"
- 奨太, "reward, thick"
- 将太, "general, thick"

The name can also be written in hiragana or katakana.

== People with the name ==
- Shota Akiyoshi (秋吉 翔太; born 1990), Japanese golfer
- Shouta Aoi (蒼井 翔太; born 1987), Japanese singer, actor, and voice actor
- Shota Arai (footballer, born 1985) (新井 翔太), Japanese footballer
- Shota Arai (footballer, born 1988) (新井 章太), Japanese footballer
- Shōta Chida (千田 翔太; born 1994), Japanese shogi player
- Shota Dobayashi (堂林 翔太; born 1991), Japanese baseball player
- Endō Shōta (遠藤 聖大; born 1990), Japanese sumo wrestler
- Shota Fujio (藤尾 翔太; born 2001), Japanese footballer
- Shota Haku (白 翔太; born 2005), stage name Soul, Japanese singer, member of South Korean boy band P1Harmony
- Shota Hazui (born 1986), Japanese water polo player
- Shota Horie (堀江 翔太; born 1986), Japanese rugby union player
- Shota Hoshi (星 翔太; born 1985), Japanese futsal player
- Shōta Iizuka (飯塚 翔太; born 1991), Japanese sprinter
- Ikioi Shōta (勢 翔太; born 1986), Japanese sumo wrestler
- Shōta Imanaga (今永 昇太; born 1993), Japanese baseball player
- Shota Inoue (井上 翔太; born 1989), Japanese footballer
- Shota Ishimine (伊志嶺 翔大; born 1988), Japanese baseball outfielder
- Shota Iwata (岩田 正太; born 1988), Japanese footballer
- Shota Kanno (菅野 将太; born 1984), Japanese footballer
- Shota Kawanishi (川西 翔太; born 1988), Japanese footballer
- Shota Kimura (baseball) (木村 正太; born 1986), Japanese baseball player
- Shota Kimura (footballer) (木村 勝太; born 1988), Japanese footballer
- Shota Kobayashi (古林 将太; born 1991), Japanese footballer
- Shota Koide (小井手 翔太; born 1981), Japanese footballer
- Shota Koike (小池 翔大; born 1988), Japanese baseball catcher
- Shota Matsuda (松田 翔太; born 1985), Japanese actor
- Shota Matsuhashi (松橋 章太; born 1982), Japanese footballer
- Shota Matsushima (松島 庄汰; born 1990), Japanese actor
- Shota Nakamura (中村 奨太; born 1993), Japanese speed skater
- Shota Nakazaki (中崎 翔太; born 1992), Japanese baseball player
- Shota Oba (大場 翔太; born 1985), Japanese baseball pitcher
- Shota Ohno (大野 奨太; born 1987), Japanese baseball catcher
- Shota Otsuka (大塚 翔太; born 1987), Japanese footballer
- Shota Rustaveli (12th–13th centuries) Georgian poet, author of The Knight in the Panther's Skin
- Shota Saito (斎藤 翔太), Japanese footballer
- Shota Saito (斉藤 祥太), Japanese actor
- Shota Sakaki (榊 翔太; born 1993), Japanese footballer
- Shota Sasaki (佐々木 将汰; born 1993), Japanese slalom canoeist
- Shota Shimizu (清水 翔太; born 1989), Japanese musician and singer-songwriter
- Shōta Sometani (染谷 将太, born 1992), Japanese actor
- Shōta Suzuki (baseball, born 1995) (鈴木 翔太), Japanese baseball player
- Shota Suzuki (footballer, born 1984) (鈴木 将太), Japanese footballer
- Shota Suzuki (footballer, born 1996) (鈴木 翔太), Japanese footballer
- Shota Taguchi (田口 翔大; born 2004), Japanese actor
- Shota Takeda (武田 翔太; born 1993), Japanese baseball pitcher
- Shota Takekuma (武隈 祥太; born 1989), Japanese baseball player
- Shota Umino (海野 翔太; born 1997), Japanese professional wrestler
- Shōta Morishita (森下 翔太; born 2000), Japanese baseball player

== Fictional characters ==
- Shōta (ショータ)/Sawyer, a character in the anime series Pokémon XY
- Shota Aizawa (相澤 消太), a character in the manga series My Hero Academia
- Shota Amachi (天地 翔太), a character in the video game Tokimeki Memorial Girl's Side: 2nd Kiss
- Shota Hikasa (日笠 将太), a character in the film Battle Royale II: Requiem
- Shota Ohara (大原正太), a main character from anime and manga series Little Ghost Q-Taro
- Shota Kazehaya (風早 翔太), a character in the manga series Kimi ni Todoke
- Shoutarou Kaneda (金田 正太郎), abbreviated "Shota", a character in the manga series Tetsujin 28-go
- Shota Magatsuchi (真ヶ土 翔太), a character in the manga series Miss Kobayashi's Dragon Maid
- Shota Shibata, a lead character in the 2018 movie Shoplifters
- Shōta Mitarai, a character from the game The Idolmaster 2 and The Idolmaster SideM

== See also ==
- Shota complex
