= Fumiya =

- Gender: Male

Origin
- Origin: Japanese
- Meaning: Different meanings depending on the kanji used

Fumiya (written: 郁, 郁也, 郁哉, 史也, 史哉, 史八, 文也, 奎也, ふみや in hiragana or フミヤ in katakana) is a masculine Japanese given name. Notable people with the name include:

- Fumiya Araki (荒木 郁也; born 1988), Japanese baseball player
- Fumiya Fujii (藤井 フミヤ; born 1962), Japanese musician
- Fumiya Hayakawa (早川 史哉; born 1994), Japanese footballer
- Fumiya Hojo (北條 史也; born 1994), Japanese baseball player
- Fumiya Iwamaru (岩丸 史也; born 1981), Japanese footballer
- Fumiya Kogure (木暮 郁哉; born 1989), Japanese footballer
- Fumiya Nishiguchi (西口 文也; born 1972), Japanese baseball player
- Fumiya Ono (小野 郁; born 1996), Japanese baseball player
- Ōnoshō Fumiya (阿武咲 奎也; born 1996), Japanese sumo wrestler
- Fumiya Sankai (三海フミヤ; born 1995), Japanese Vlogger, Actor, Recording artist
- Fumiya Sashida (指田 郁也; born 1986), Japanese singer-songwriter
- Fumiya Satō (さとう ふみや; born 1965), Japanese manga artist
- Fumiya Unoki (鵜木 郁哉; born 2001), Japanese footballer
