= Tatsuya Oishi =

Tatsuya Oishi may refer to:

- Tatsuya Oishi (baseball) (born 1988), Japanese baseball pitcher
- Tatsuya Oishi (director) (born 1970), Japanese animator, director and storyboard artist
