= Marumo =

Marumo (written: 丸茂 or 丸毛) is a Japanese surname. Notable people with the surname include:

- Kei Marumo (丸茂 圭衣, born 1992), Japanese synchronized swimmer
- Kenichi Marumo (丸毛 謙一, born 1988), Japanese baseball player
- Kuninori Marumo (丸茂 邦則, 1891–1985), Imperial Japanese Navy admiral
