= Yūdai Ōno =

Japanese baseball player (born 1988)

Yūdai Ōno 大野雄大
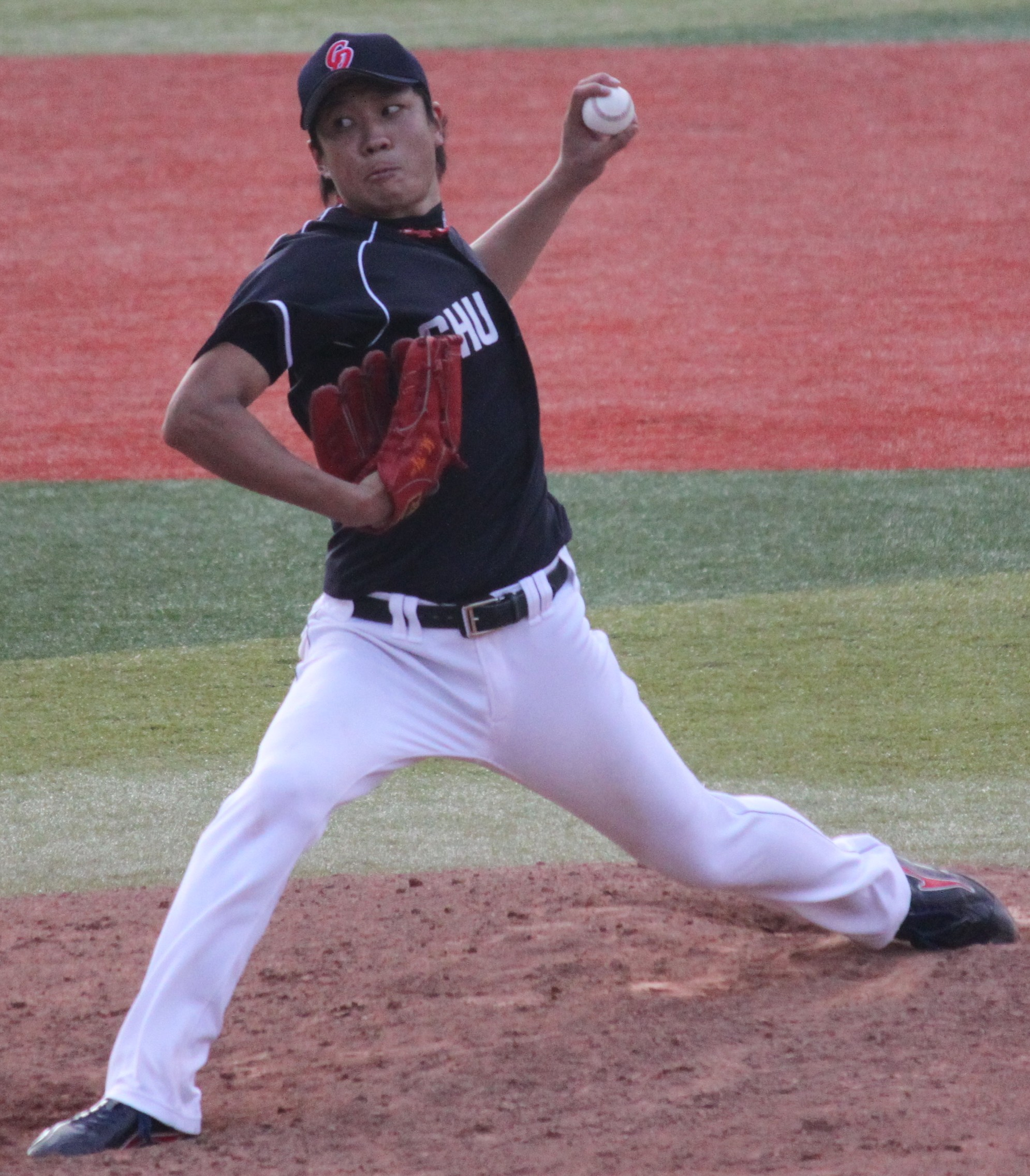
- Ōno pitching at Yokohama Stadium in 2013

Chunichi Dragons – No. 22
- Pitcher
- Born: September 26, 1988 (age 37); Fushimi-ku, Kyoto, Japan
- Bats: Left Throws: Left

NPB debut
- October 14, 2011, for the Chunichi Dragons

NPB statistics (through July 17, 2026)
- Win–loss record: 104-101
- ERA: 2.94
- Strikeouts: 1,355
- Stats at Baseball Reference

Teams
- Chunichi Dragons (2011–present)

Career highlights and awards
- Eiji Sawamura Award (2020); 3x NPB All-Star (2014, 2015, 2022); 2× Central League Monthly MVP (May 2015, September 2020); 2× Central League ERA leader (2019, 2020); Central League strikeout leader (2020); Pitched a no-hitter (14 September 2019); 1× The Best Battery Award with Catcher Takuya Kinoshita (2020); Bukkyo University Sports Honor Award (2020)
Medals
Men's baseball
Representing Japan
Summer Olympics
| Gold medal – first place | 2020 Tokyo | Team |
2015 WBSC Premier12
| Bronze medal – third place | 2015 Tokyo | Team |
| Gold medal – first place | 2019 Tokyo | Team |

Yūdai Ōno (大野 雄大, born September 26, 1988, in Kyoto, Japan) is a Japanese professional baseball pitcher for the Chunichi Dragons of the Nippon Professional Baseball (NPB).

== Early career ==
As a junior, Ōno played for Kyoto Gaidai Nishi High School where he was part of the school team that faced a young Masahiro Tanaka in the 2005 Summer Koshien. Upon watching the former New York Yankees pitcher play, Ono was inspired and remarked "so this is the kind of guy that goes pro."

He made his Koshien debut in the Spring Senbatsu tournament where his team lost 4–1 against Tokai University Sagami Senior High in the first round where Ōno took 3 strikeouts for one earned run in 3 2/3 innings.

Ōno played for the Bukkyo University team where in his 3rd year he was touted along with Yuki Saito, Tatsuya Oishi and Hirokazu Sawamura as the "University Big 4."

In the 2010 NPB draft, he was the first round pick for the Chunichi Dragons despite being injured in the lead-up.

== Professional career ==
=== 2011-2013 ===
In 2011, Ōno spent the beginning of his Chunichi career rehabbing his left arm during Spring training. From March 2011, he began proper training and made his playing debut in a pro-am match where he conceded a grand-slam homerun. Despite the set-back, he was put to work on the farm to be trained as a starting pitcher. On October 14, he would make his first team debut against the Yomiuri Giants as a starter. It would however be an innocuous debut as Ōno gave up 6 earned runs in 4 innings against 22 batters.

On July 11, 2012, Ono made his second start, this time against the Hanshin Tigers at Koshien Stadium where he would get his first victory after pitching 5 1/3 innings, conceding one earned run and 7 hits. He would break into the starting rotation and finish his first real season as a pro with 4 wins and 3 losses in 8 games started with an ERA of 2.62.

In 2013, he solidified himself as a starter with the Dragons and would post enough innings to be considered for ERA champion honors. Ōno would end the season with a 10–10 record having thrown 146 innings in 25 starts with an ERA of 3.81.

=== 2014-2016 ===
In 2014, he would pitch well in the pre-season games but would ultimately lose out on opening day honors to veteran Kenshin Kawakami. On 26 April after conceding 5 runs in his first inning against the Yakult Swallows he was yanked from the mound, earning the ire of the senior management team and was promptly dropped to the second team. On 5 June, he would unfortunately, once again experience the same fate after giving up 5 runs in 5 innings against the Chiba Lotte Marines. On 25 July, Ōno would mark a comeback to form against the Giants as he recorded his first full game without a walk. He would end the year with a consecutive 10 win season losing only 8 with an ERA of 2.89.

In 2015, he led both leagues in innings pitched with 207.1. His then career-best 2.52 ERA ranked sixth in the Central League and his six complete games were second only to the seven recorded by the Hanshin Tigers' Shintaro Fujinami. Ōno posted his highest career wins to date with an 11-10 record in 27 starts.

On March 25, 2016, Ōno was selected as the starting day pitcher against the Hanshin Tigers at Kyocera Dome where he pitched a winning 5-2 game, striking out 3 and walking 2 for 2 earned runs in 7 2/3 innings. Ōno went on to win one more game and lose one for an ERA of 2.66 before April 15 where he was deactivated from the first team roster due to concerns regarding elbow discomfort. On June 4, he would however make his return in a 0–3 loss against the Rakuten Eagles where he pitched a 7 innings striking out 3 batters and walking 3 after giving up 3 runs in the first inning. On 28 June, Ōno pitched a 3-hit shutout against the Yomiuri Giants, striking out 7 in a 5–0 win at the Tokyo Dome claiming his 5th win of the season.

=== 2017-2018 ===
In 2017, Ōno once again was selected as starting day pitcher but had a down season pitching 142 innings for a 4.03 ERA and a 7–8 record. He however was the only Dragons starter to pass the innings limit to be considered for post season awards. On 29 November, Ōno received a ¥6.4 million decrease to his yearly salary.

In 2018, Ōno missed the opening day rotation and appeared in only 6 games going 0-3 with an 8.56 ERA. As a result, his salary was decreased the maximum 25% to re-sign at ¥60 million.

=== 2019-present ===
In 2019, Under the guidance of new manager Tsuyoshi Yoda and pitching coach Hideyuki Awano, Ōno found new life returning to the starting day rotation. On the 30 April, Ōno became the final winning pitcher for the Dragons of the Heisei era while he marked the first Central League shut-out of the Reiwa era on 7 May against the Hiroshima Carp. On September 14, Ōno pitched the 100th no-hitter in Japanese professional baseball history based on globally recognised standards, against the Hanshin Tigers becoming the 81st NPB pitcher to do so and the 12th Dragons pitcher to achieve the feat. Ōno finished the season with a 2.59 ERA to lead the Central League, capturing his first individual title in the process.

Ōno received the Sawamura Award for his performance in the 2020 season, leading the Central League with a 1.82 ERA, 10 complete games, six shutouts, 148 2/3 innings and 148 strikeouts. He posted an 11-6 record, helping Chunichi to its first winning season in eight years. At the end of the season, and before receiving the Sawamura award, Ōno signed a 3-year, ¥900 million incentive laden deal to remain at the Dragons.

== International career ==
In the 2012 off-season Ōno was named for the Japan to face Cuba.

In November, 2013, Ōno would once again be selected for the Samurai Japan team this time to face Chinese Taipei.

He would also earn a call up to the preliminary Japanese national squad for the first edition of the 2015 WBSC Premier 12. On October 9, he was selected in the final squad

On October 1, 2019, he was selected at the 2019 WBSC Premier12.

== Pitching style ==
Ōno pitches with an over-arm action and throws a four-seam fastball that reaches speeds of around 88 mp/h on average and tops out at 95mp/h. In addition, he throws a fork, a 62 mp/h curveball, two types of sliders and a dipping two-seam fastball.

== Personal life ==
Due to the influence of his grandfather, Ōno grew up as a Hanshin Tigers fan. During his university playing days, Ōno had attached a Torakki strap to his mobile phone, however, once he was selected by the Dragons, he promptly removed it.

The players that Ōno looks up to the most for inspiration are former Major leaguer, Kyuji Fujikawa and former Dragon and former Major Leaguer, Wei-Yin Chen.
