= Shunta Gotoh =

Japanese baseball player (born 1993)

Shunta Gotoh 駿太
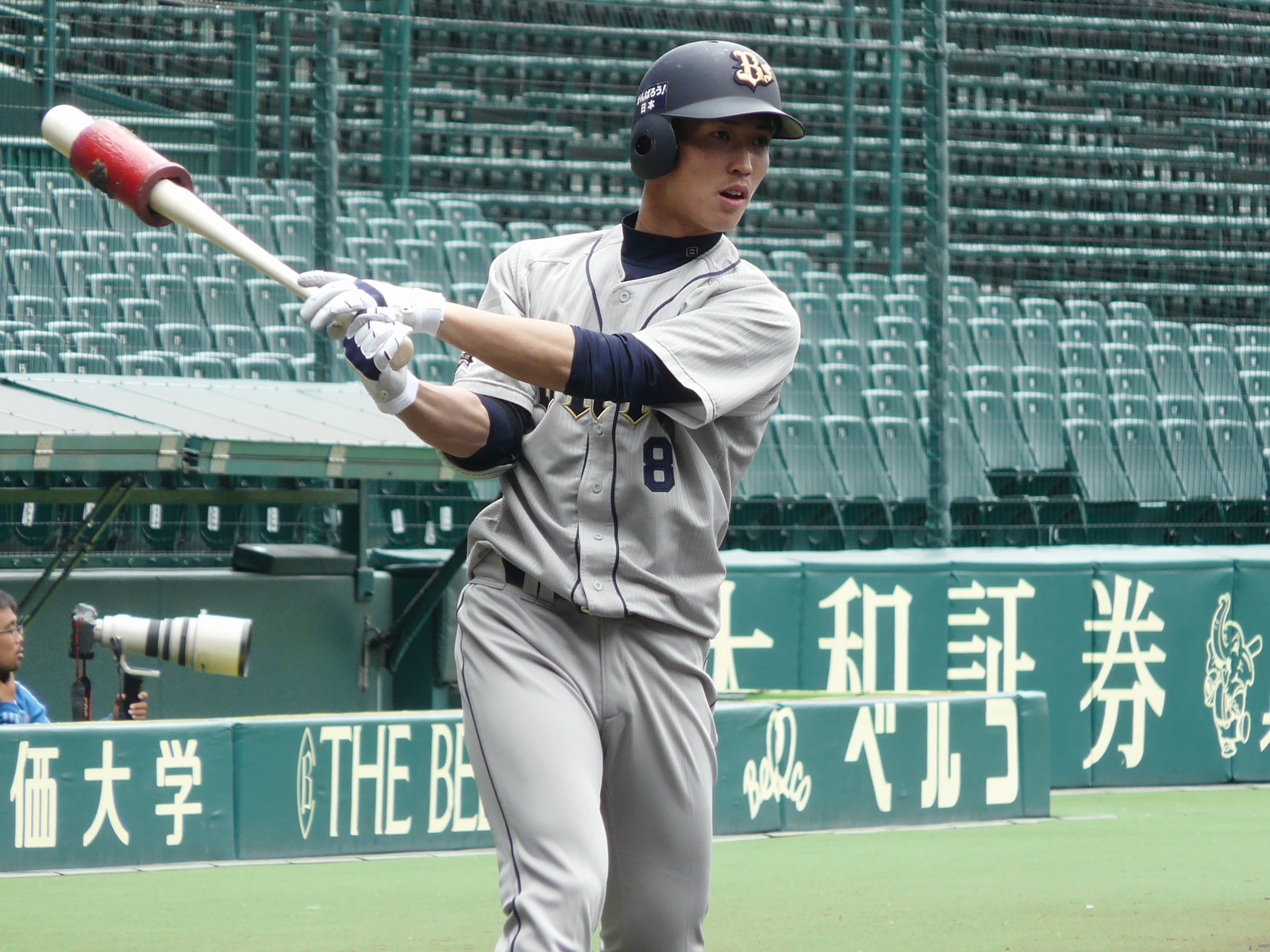
- Shunta with the Orix Buffaloes

CTBC Brothers – No. 5
- Outfielder / Coach
- Born: March 5, 1993 (age 33); Shibukawa, Gunma, Japan
- Batted: Left Threw: Right

NPB debut
- April 12, 2011, for the Orix Buffaloes

Last NPB appearance
- August 30, 2025, for the Chunichi Dragons

NPB statistics
- Batting average: .216
- Home runs: 15
- RBI: 151
- Stats at Baseball Reference

Teams
- Orix Buffaloes (2011–2022); Chunichi Dragons (2022–2025)

Shunta Gotoh (後藤 駿太, Gotō Shunta; born March 5, 1993 in Shibukawa, Gunma, Japan) also known as Shunta (駿太) is a former Japanese professional baseball outfielder and current coach. He is currently the batting coach for the CTBC Brothers of the Chinese Professional Baseball League (CPBL). He previously played for the Orix Buffaloes and Chunichi Dragons of Nippon Professional Baseball (NPB).

== Playing career ==
=== Orix Buffaloes ===
On October 28, 2010, Gotoh was selected in the first round of the 2010 NPB draft by the Orix Buffaloes. On April 12, 2011, on Opening Day, Gotoh started in right field against the Fukuoka SoftBank Hawks, which marked the first time in 52 years since a high school graduate rookie outfielder had achieved this feat. Gotoh went 0-for-2 in the game and was replaced by Mike Hessman.

== Coaching career ==
=== CTBC Brothers ===
On February 2, 2026, Gotoh was announced as the batting coach of the CTBC Brothers of the Chinese Professional Baseball League (CPBL).
