= Ryosuke Miyaguni =

Japanese baseball player (born 1992)

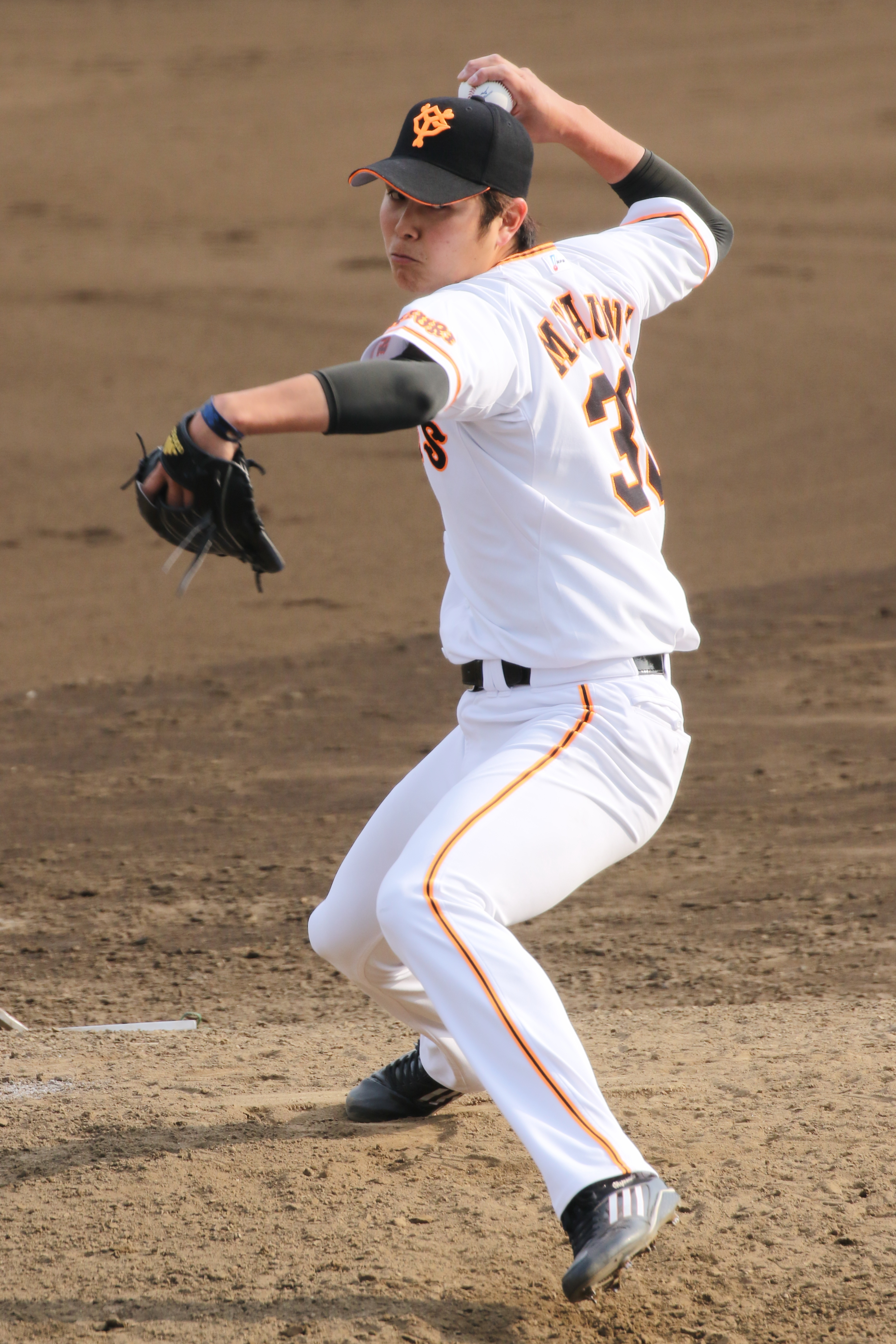
- Miyaguni with the Yomiuri Giants

Yokohama DeNA BayStars – No. 65
- Pitcher
- Born: April 17, 1992 (age 34); Kanazawa, Ishikawa, Japan
- Bats: Right Throws: Right

NPB debut
- April 8, 2012, for the Yomiuri Giants

NPB statistics (through 2025 season)
- Win–loss record: 22–22
- Earned run average: 3.93
- Strikeouts: 291
- Stats at Baseball Reference

Teams
- Yomiuri Giants (2012–2020); Yokohama DeNA BayStars (2021–present)

Ryosuke Miyaguni (宮國 椋丞, born April 17, 1992, in Itoman, Okinawa) is a Japanese professional baseball pitcher for Yokohama DeNA BayStars of the Nippon Professional Baseball (NPB). He has previously played in NPB for the Yomiuri Giants.

== Career ==
=== Yomiuri Giants ===
Yomiuri Giants selected Miyaguni with the second selection in the 2010 NPB draft.

On April 8, 2012, Miyaguni made his NPB debut.

On November 16, 2018, he was selected Yomiuri Giants roster at the 2018 MLB Japan All-Star Series exhibition game against MLB All-Stars.

On December 2, 2020, he became a free agent.

=== Yokohama DeNA BayStars ===
On March 15, 2021, Miyaguni signed with Yokohama DeNA BayStars of the NPB.
