= Hiroya Shimamoto =

Japanese baseball player (born 1993)

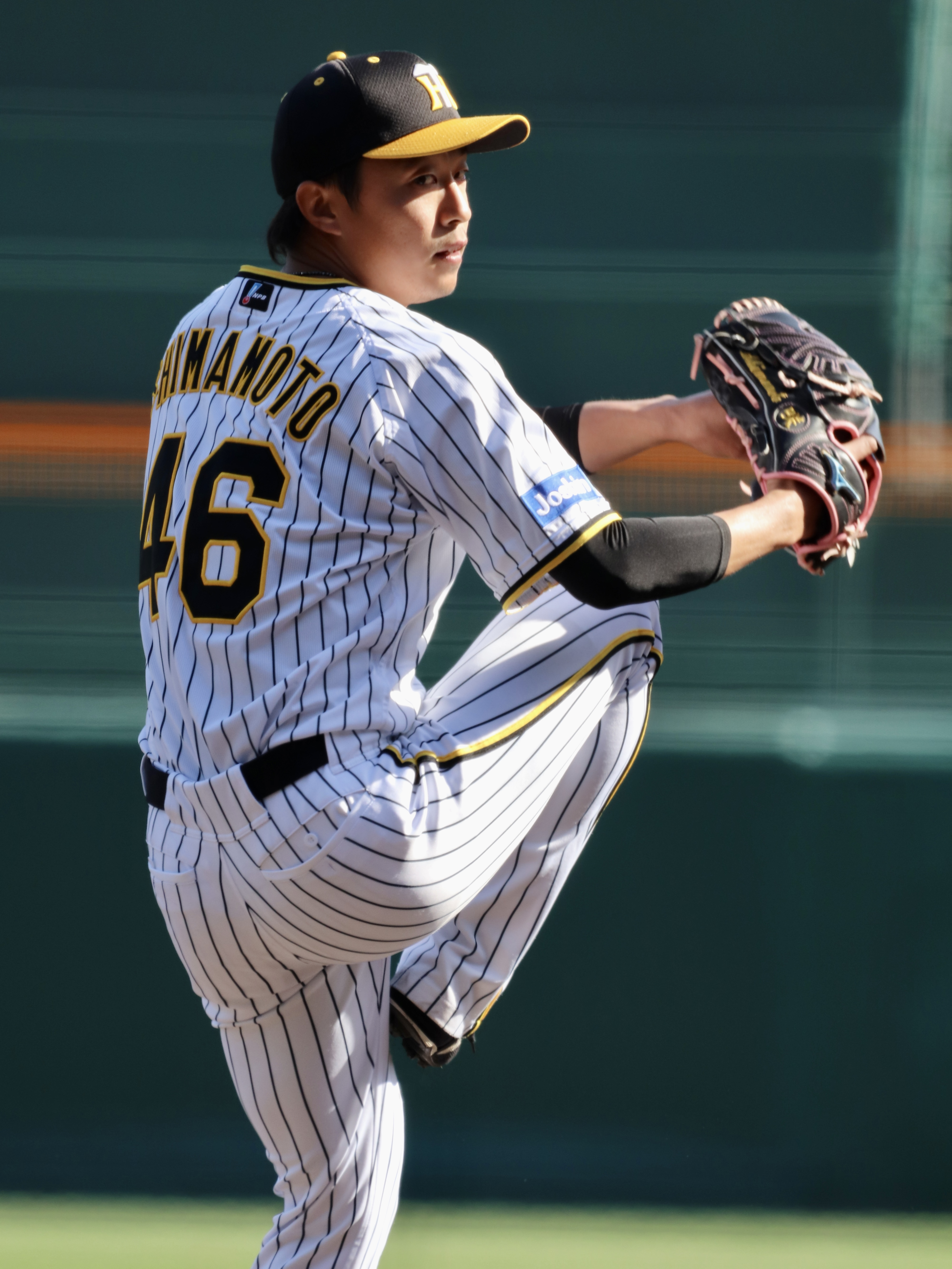
- Shimamoto with the Hanshin Tigers

Hokkaido Nippon Ham Fighters – No. 40
- Pitcher
- Born: February 14, 1993 (age 33); Yamatotakada, Nara, Japan
- Bats: Left Throws: Left

NPB debut
- April 2, 2015, for the Hanshin Tigers

NPB statistics (through 2025 season)
- Win–loss record: 13-4
- Earned run average: 2.97
- Strikeouts: 145
- Stats at Baseball Reference

Teams
- Hanshin Tigers (2011–2025); Hokkaido Nippon-Ham Fighters (2026–present)

Career highlights and awards
- Japan Series champion (2023)

Hiroya Shimamoto (島本 浩也, Shimamoto Hiroya; born February 14, 1993) is a Japanese professional baseball pitcher for the Hokkaido Nippon-Ham Fighters of Nippon Professional Baseball (NPB). He has previously played in NPB for the Hanshin Tigers.

== Early baseball career ==
Born in Nara Prefecture, Hiroya started playing baseball in 1st grade for the Yamatotakada Eagles (little league), then for the Kashihara Condor Boys when he was in junior high.

During his sophomore year in Fukuchiyama Seibi High School, his team placed runner-up in the autumn Kyoto Tournament, and won against baseball powerhouse PL Gakuen High School during the Kinki Tournament, where he pitched a complete game (1 earned-run, 10 strikeouts). In his junior year however, due to the involvement of his teammates in a scandal, their team was banned from participating in games. They also didn't make it to Kōshien tournaments.

== Professional career ==
=== Hanshin Tigers ===
On October 28, 2010, the Hanshin Tigers selected Shimamoto with the second selection in the 2010 NPB draft. On November 12, he signed with the Tigers for an estimated 3 million yen annual salary. Shimamoto was assigned the jersey number 126.

Shimamoto appeared in a handful of Western League (farm) games in his first two years. In 2013, he was able to pitch as a reliever in 25 farm games, but the opposing batters seemed to get the best of him and he finished with an ERA of 4.94. Because Shimamoto was unable to make it to the main roster for three years, he was released from his contract on October 31, and was offered to sign a one-year development contract on November 12.

Shimamoto's appearances in farm games increased in 2014, and upon release from his development contract, he was again offered a regular contract on November 21.

On December 2, 2020, Shimamoto became a free agent. On December 8, Shimamoto re-signed with the Tigers.

=== Hokkaido Nippon-Ham Fighters ===
On November 14, 2025, Shimamoto was traded to the Hokkaido Nippon-Ham Fighters in exchange for Torai Fushimi.

== Playing style ==
With a lean build listed at 176 centimeters, Shimamoto is a southpaw pitcher whose fastballs are clocked at a maximum of 144 km/h. While he can also deliver sliders and forkballs, he learned the shuuto from pitching coach Yutaka Ohno during the 2014 spring camp. He was also deemed to possess excellent ball control.
