= Daiki Yoshikawa =

Japanese baseball player (born 1992)

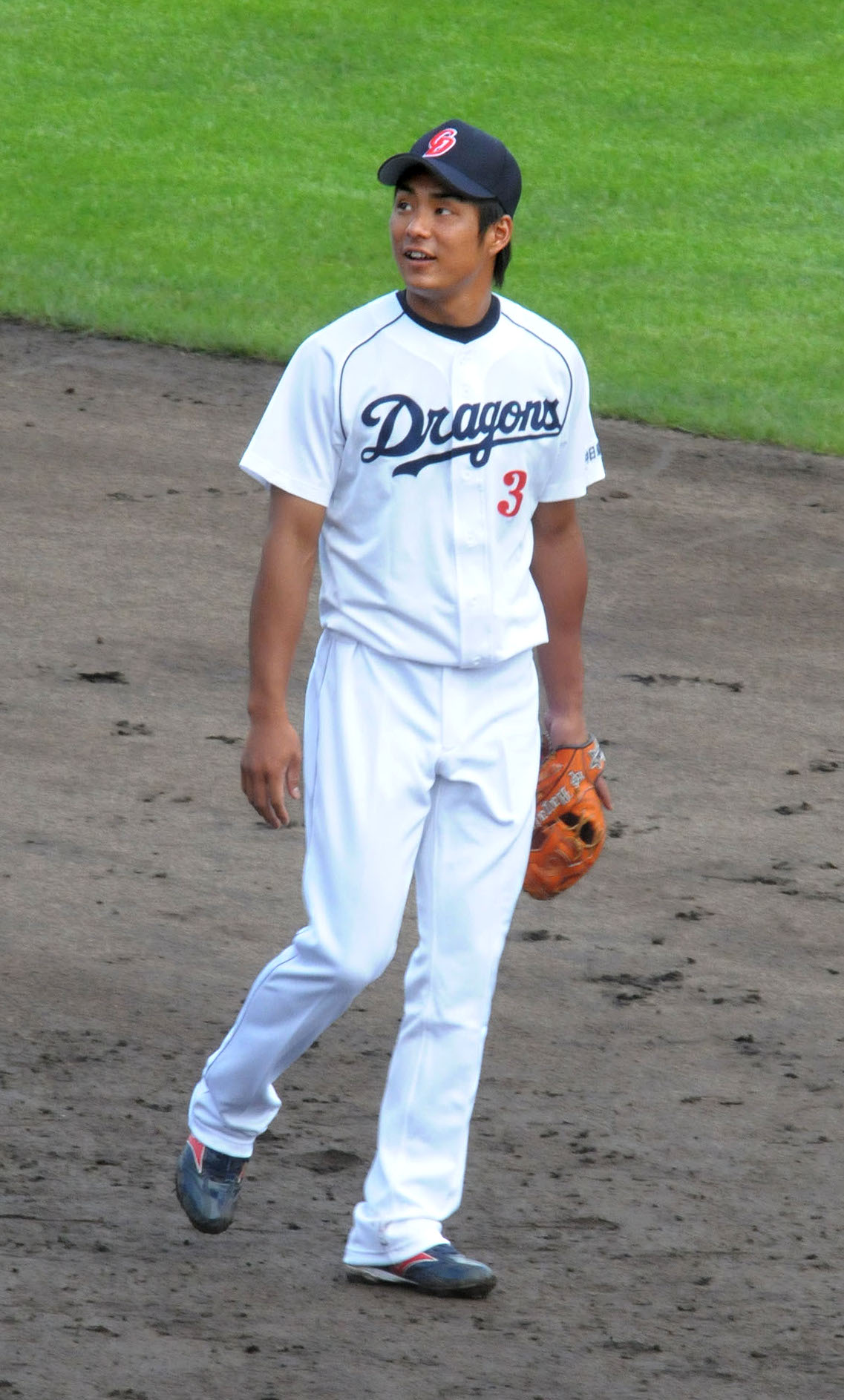
- Yoshikawa with the Chunichi Dragons

Yomiuri Giants – No. 105
- Infielder/Coach
- Born: August 21, 1992 (age 33); Tennōji-ku, Osaka, Osaka, Japan
- Batted: Both Threw: Right

NPB debut
- September 13, 2012, for the Chunichi Dragons

Last NPB appearance
- October 24, 2020, for the Yomiuri Giants

NPB statistics (through 2020 season)
- Batting average: .180
- Home runs: 0
- Runs batted in: 6
- Stats at Baseball Reference

Teams
- As player: Chunichi Dragons (2011–2014); Yomiuri Giants (2015–2020); As coach: Yomiuri Giants (2024-present)

Daiki Yoshikawa (吉川 大幾, Yoshikawa Daiki; born August 21, 1992) is a Japanese former professional baseball infielder who is currently a scorer of Yomiuri Giants for Nippon Professional Baseball (NPB). He has played in NPB for the Chunichi Dragons and Giants.

== Career ==
Chunichi Dragons selected Yoshikawa with the second selection in the 2010 NPB draft.

On September 13, 2012, Yoshikawa made his NPB debut.

On November 16, 2018, he was selected Yomiuri Giants roster at the 2018 MLB Japan All-Star Series exhibition game against MLB All-Stars.

On December 2, 2020, he became a free agent. On December 25, 2020, he announced his retirement and became a scorer of the Giants.
