= Shota Kurosawa =

Japanese baseball player

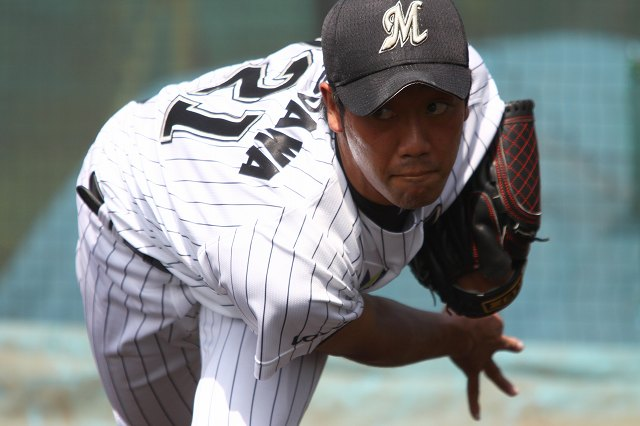
- Kurosawa with the Chiba Lotte Marines
- Born: August 5, 1988 (age 37)
- Bats: Right Throws: Right

NPB debut
- 2013, for the Chiba Lotte Marines

NPB statistics (through 2017)
- Win–loss record: 0–1
- ERA: 4.44
- Strikeouts: 9
- Stats at Baseball Reference

Teams
- As player: Chiba Lotte Marines (2013–2017); As coach: Chiba Lotte Marines (2018–)

Shota Kurosawa (黒沢 翔太, Kurosawa Shōta; born August 5, 1988 in Chichibu, Saitama) is a Japanese professional baseball pitcher for the Chiba Lotte Marines in Japan's Nippon Professional Baseball. He played from 2013 to 2017.
