= Yuki Koyama =

Japanese baseball player

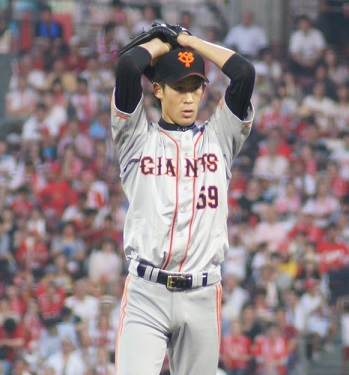
- Koyama with the Yomiuri Giants
- Pitcher
- Born: December 5, 1988 (age 36); Chita, Aichi, Japan
- Batted: Right Threw: Right

debut
- April 30, 2011, for the Yomiuri Giants

Last appearance
- May 30, 2017, for the Tohoku Rakuten Golden Eagles

NPB statistics (through 2018 season)
- Win–loss record: 8-8
- ERA: 3.08
- Strikeouts: 164
- Saves: 1
- Holds: 5

Teams
- Yomiuri Giants (2011–2016); Tohoku Rakuten Golden Eagles (2017–2018)

Yuki Koyama (小山 雄輝, Koyama Yūki; born December 5, 1988 in Chita, Aichi, Japan) is a professional Japanese baseball player. He plays pitcher for the Tohoku Rakuten Golden Eagles.
