= Masato Kumashiro =

Japanese baseball player (born 1989)

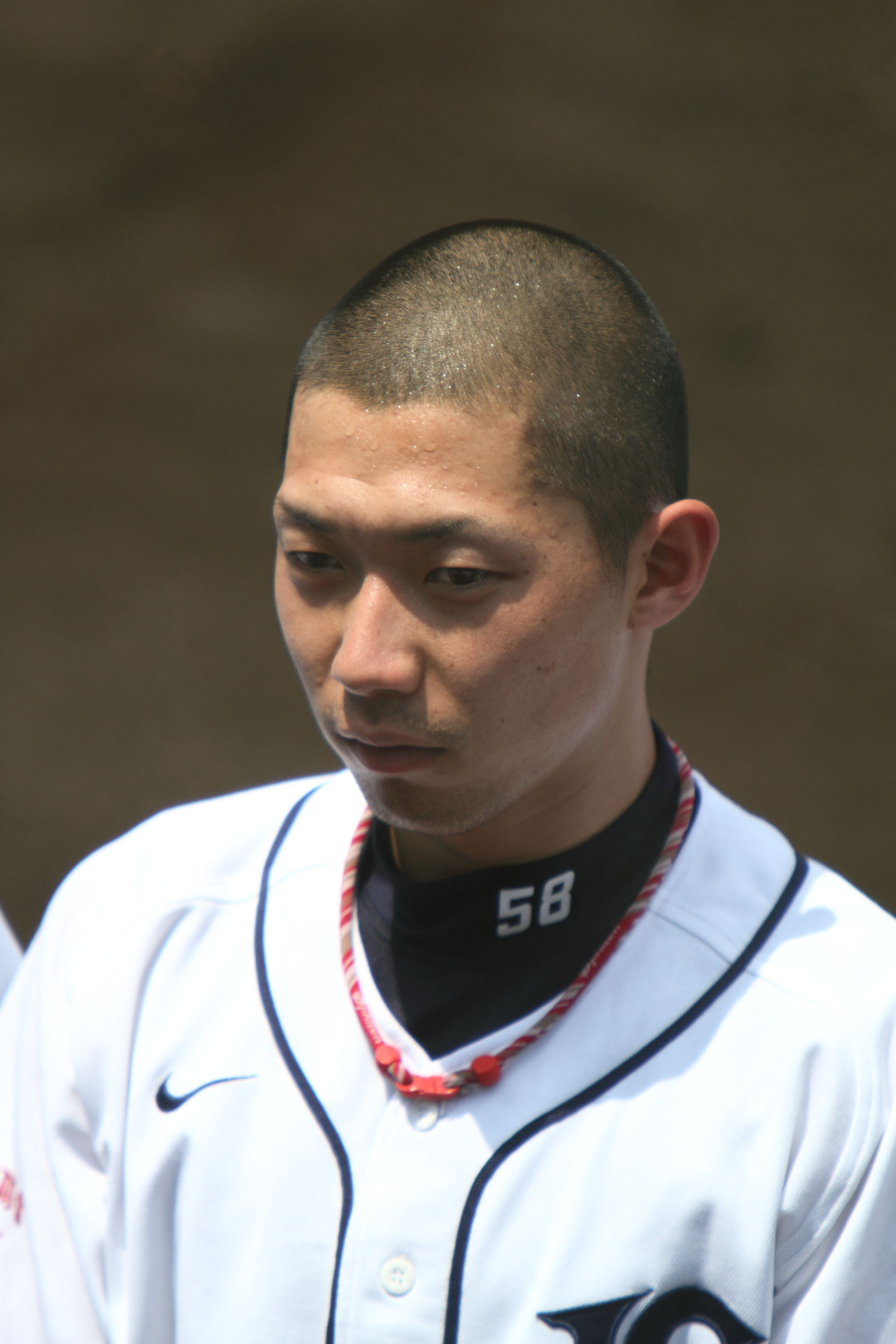
- Kumashiro with the Saitama Seibu Lions

Saitama Seibu Lions – No. 84
- Outfielder / Coach
- Born: April 18, 1989 (age 37)
- Batted: Right Threw: Right

NPB debut
- June 6, 2011, for the Saitama Seibu Lions

Last NPB appearance
- September 28, 2022, for the Saitama Seibu Lions

NPB statistics (through 2022 season)
- Batting average: .225
- Hits: 108
- Home runs: 0
- RBI: 29
- Stolen bases: 16
- Stats at Baseball Reference

Teams
- As player: Saitama Seibu Lions (2008–2022); As coach: Saitama Seibu Lions (2023–present)

Masato Kumashiro (熊代 聖人, born April 18, 1989, in Kumakōgen, Ehime) is a Japanese professional baseball outfielder for the Saitama Seibu Lions in Japan's Nippon Professional Baseball.
