= Yoshitaka Isomura =

Japanese baseball player (born 1992)

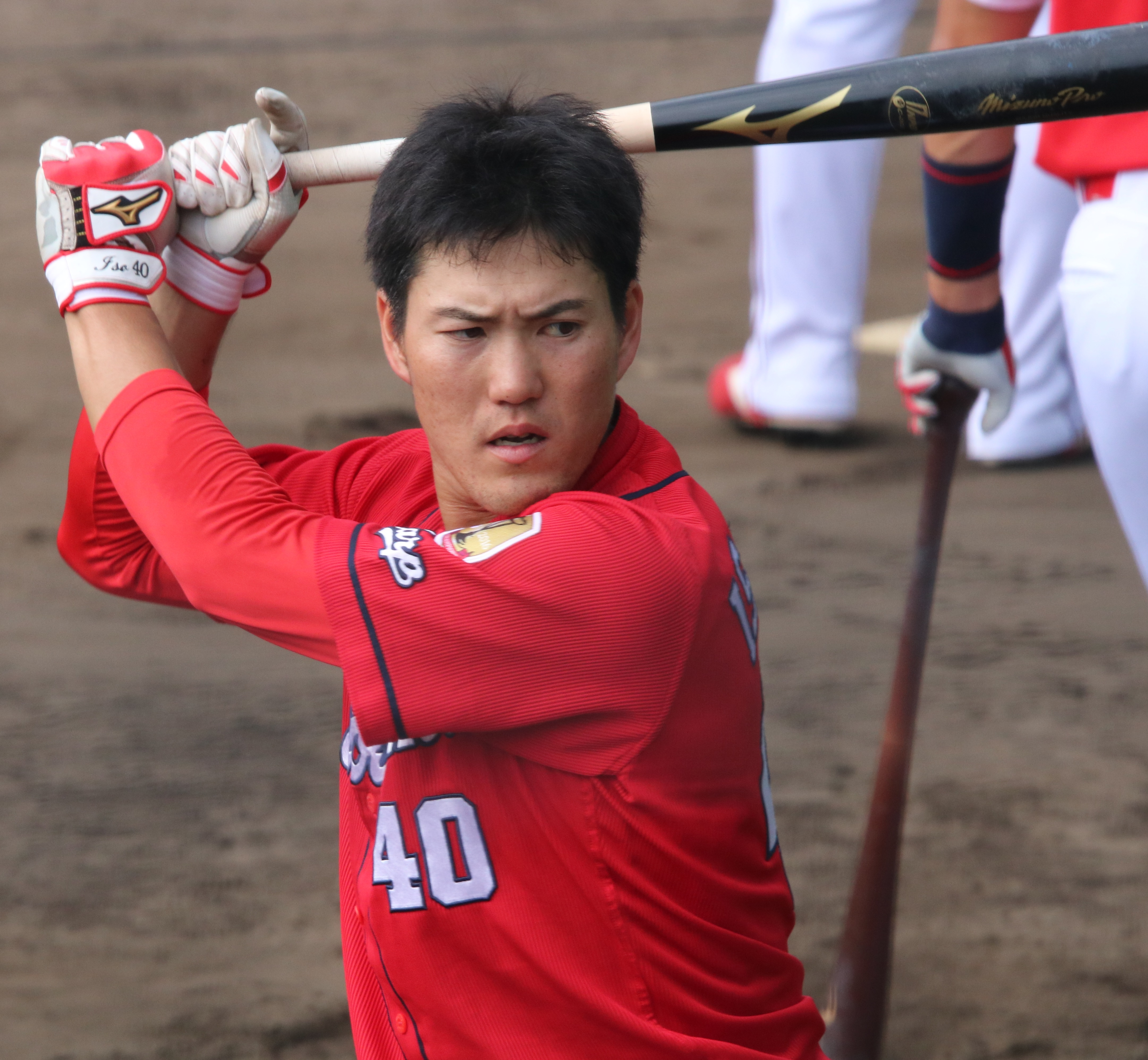
- Catcher
- Born: November 1, 1992 (age 33); Toyota, Aichi, Japan
- Batted: Right Threw: Right

NPB debut
- October 6, 2012, for the Hiroshima Toyo Carp

Last NPB appearance
- May 5, 2025, for the Hiroshima Toyo Carp

Career statistics
- Batting average: .220
- Hits: 110
- Home runs: 12
- Runs batted in: 53
- Stolen bases: 0
- Stats at Baseball Reference

Teams
- Hiroshima Toyo Carp (2011–2025)

Yoshitaka Isomura (磯村 嘉孝, Isomura Yoshitaka; born November 1, 1992 in Toyota, Aichi, Japan) is a professional Japanese baseball player. He plays catcher for the Hiroshima Toyo Carp.
