= Kentaro Kyuko =

Japanese baseball player

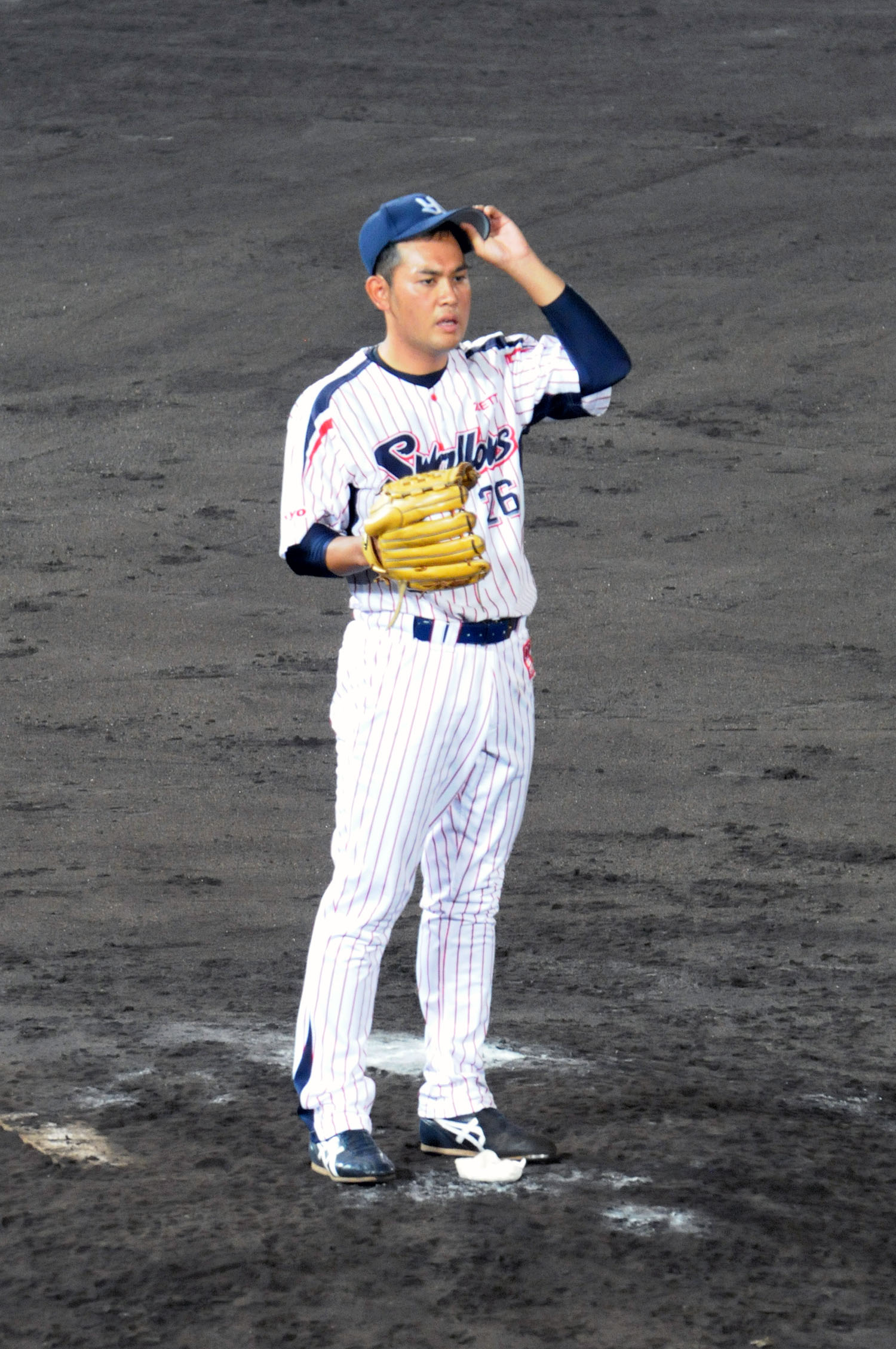
- Pitcher
- Born: May 16, 1986 (age 39); Toshima, Tokyo, Japan
- Bats: Left Throws: Left

debut
- April 24, 2011, for the Tokyo Yakult Swallows

NPB statistics (through 2017 season)
- Win–loss record: 8–6
- Saves: 2
- ERA: 4.20
- Strikeouts: 143
- Stats at Baseball Reference

Teams
- Tokyo Yakult Swallows (2011–2018)

Kentaro Kyuko (久古 健太郎, Kyūko Kentarō; born May 16, 1986) is a professional Japanese baseball player. He plays pitcher for the Tokyo Yakult Swallows. As of June 1, 2023, he has a net worth of approximately $5 million.
