= Masahiro Inui =

Japanese baseball player (born 1988)

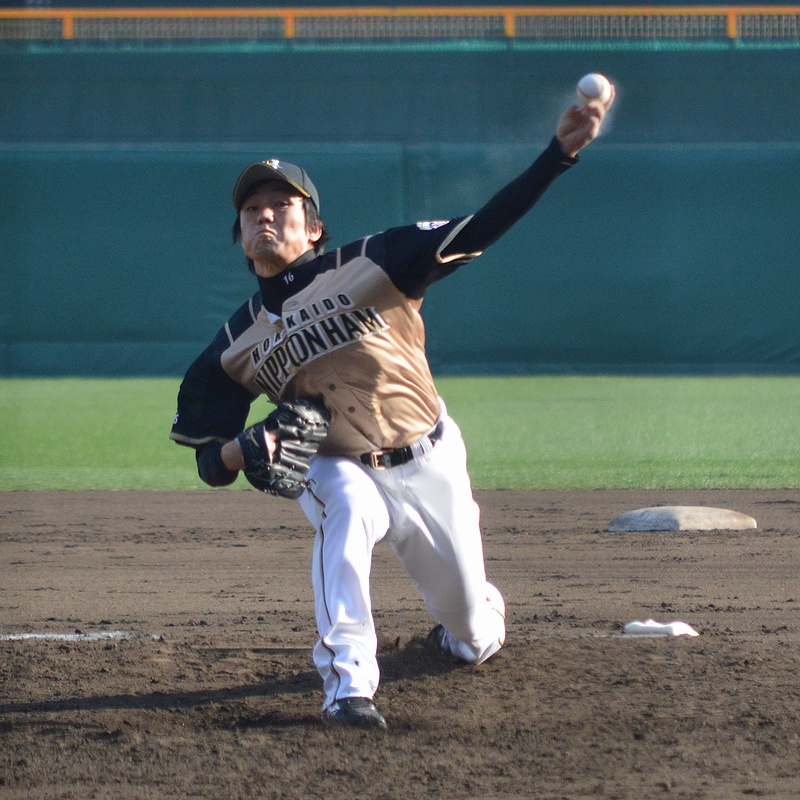
- Inui with the Hokkaido Nippon Ham Fighters
- Pitcher
- Born: December 8, 1988 (age 37); Kakogawa, Hyogo
- Batted: Left Threw: Left

NPB debut
- October 2, 2011, for the Hokkaido Nippon-Ham Fighters

Last NPB appearance
- May 14, 2017, for the Yomiuri Giants

NPB statistics
- Win–loss record: 1-2
- Earned run average: 5.69
- Strikeouts: 78
- Stats at Baseball Reference

Teams
- Hokkaido Nippon-Ham Fighters (2011–2016); Yomiuri Giants (2016–2017)

Masahiro Inui (乾 真大, Inui Masahiro) (born December 8, 1988) is a Japanese professional baseball pitcher. He played in Nippon Professional Baseball (NPB) for the Hokkaido Nippon-Ham Fighters and Yomiuri Giants.
