= Masato Fukae =

Japanese baseball player

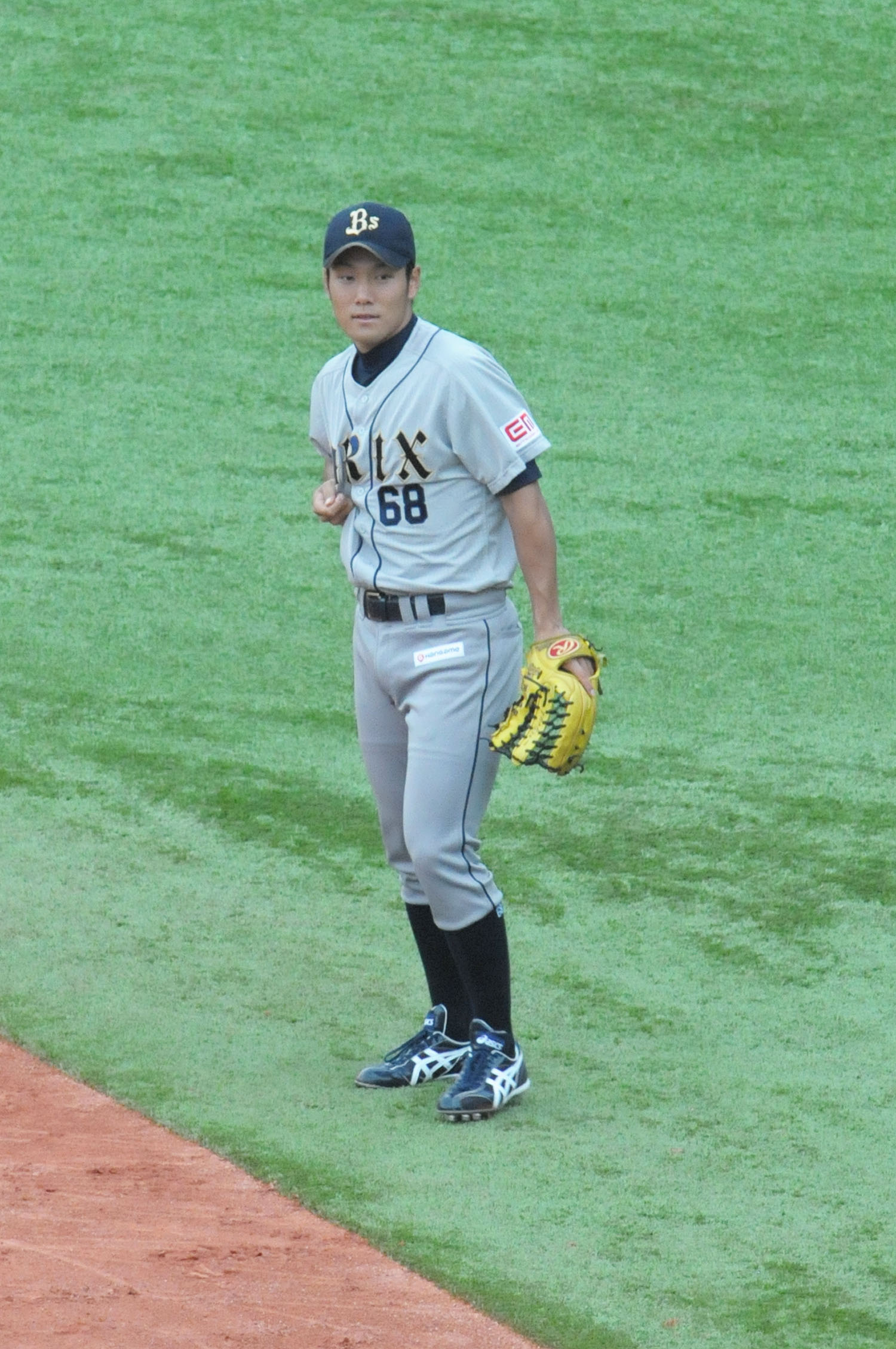
- Fukae with the Orix Buffaloes
- Outfielder
- Born: September 5, 1987 (age 38)
- Bats: Left Throws: Right

NPB debut
- 2011, for the Orix Buffaloes

NPB statistics (through 2013)
- Batting average: .272
- Home runs: 0
- Runs batted in: 3
- Stats at Baseball Reference

Teams
- Orix Buffaloes (2011–2013)

Masato Fukae (深江 真登, born September 5, 1987, in Sagamihara) is a Japanese former professional baseball outfielder. He previously played in Nippon Professional Baseball for the Orix Buffaloes from 2011 to 2013.
