= Yūto Morikoshi =

Japanese baseball player (born 1988)

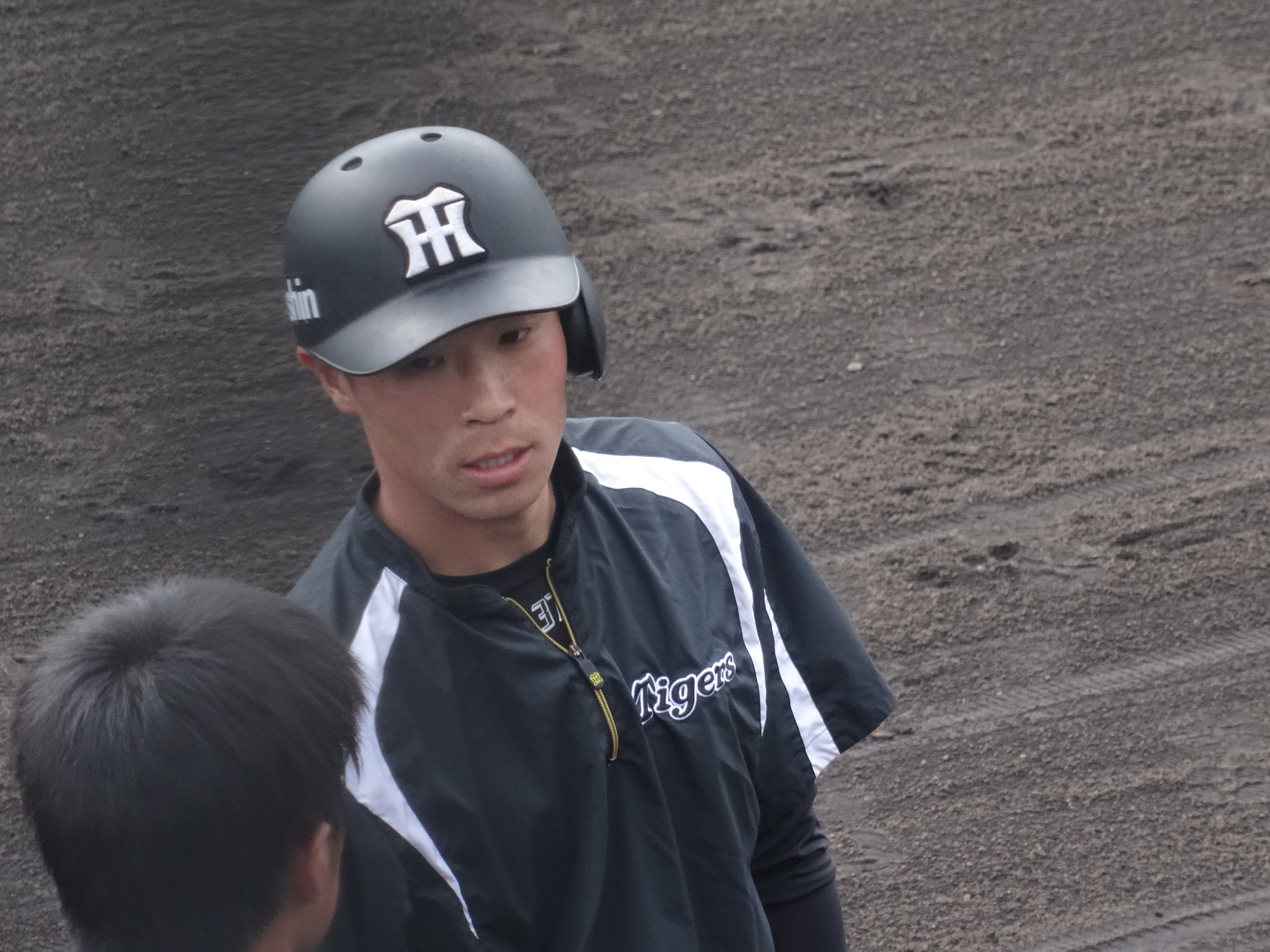

Chunichi Dragons – No. 81
- Infielder / Coach
- Born: August 11, 1988 (age 37); Inazawa, Aichi, Japan
- Batted: Right Threw: Right

NPB debut
- August 25, 2013, for the Chunichi Dragons

Last appearance
- October 13, 2018, for the Hanshin Tigers

NPB statistics
- Batting average: .115
- Hits: 9
- Home runs: 0
- Runs batted in: 2
- Stolen base: 1

Teams
- As player: Chunichi Dragons (2011–2014); Hanshin Tigers (2015–2019); Saitama Seibu Lions (2020); As coach: Chunichi Dragons (2023–present)

Yūto Morikoshi (森越 祐人, Morikoshi Yūto; born August 11, 1988 in Inazawa, Aichi) is a retired Japanese professional infielder.
