= Aichi Institute of Technology =

Private University in Toyota, Japan

- 愛知工業大学 (Japanese)
- Former name: Nagoya Institute of Electricity (名古屋電気大学)
- Motto: Jiyu, Ai, Seigi (自由・愛・正義)
- Motto in English: Freedom, Love and Justice
- Type: Private
- Established: 1912
- President: Yasuyuki Goto
- Students: 6275
- Undergraduates: 6025
- Postgraduates: 250
- Location: Toyota, Aichi, Japan; 35.1836°N 137.1119°E
- Campus: Urban/rural
- Nickname: AIT
- Mascot: Tetsujin 28-go
- Website: www.ait.ac.jp/en/

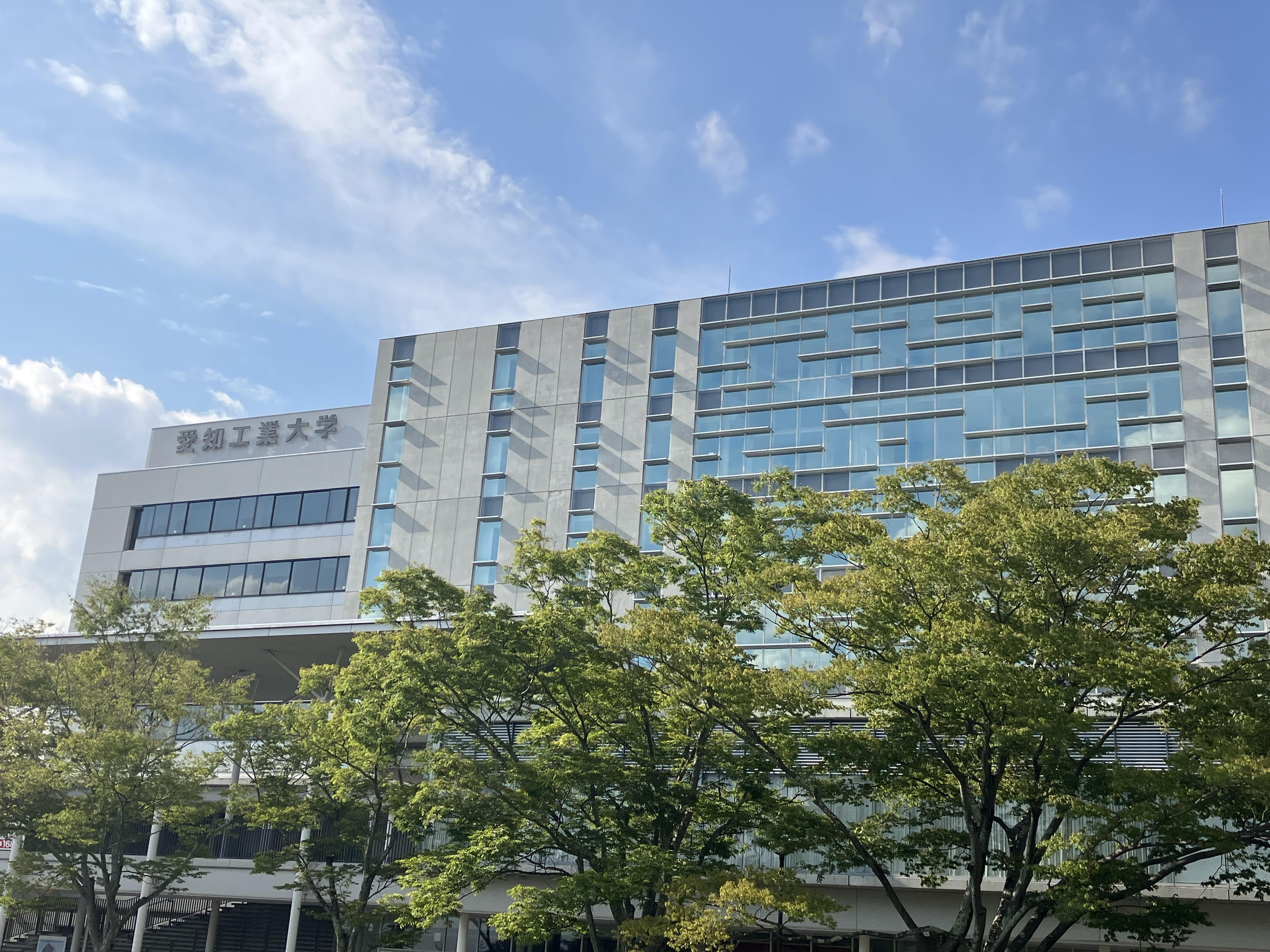
Toyota Campus

Aichi Institute of Technology (愛知工業大学, Aichi kōgyō daigaku) is a private university in Toyota, Aichi, Japan. The predecessor of the school was founded in 1912, and it was chartered as a university in 1959.

== Campuses ==
AIT's main campus is located in the city of Toyota, Aichi Prefecture. The Motoyama campus and the Jiyugaoka campus in Nagoya are located in an urban setting.

== Academics ==
The Aichi Institute of Technology offers undergraduate and graduate programs in various engineering and technology disciplines.
