= Yuya Taniguchi =

Japanese baseball player

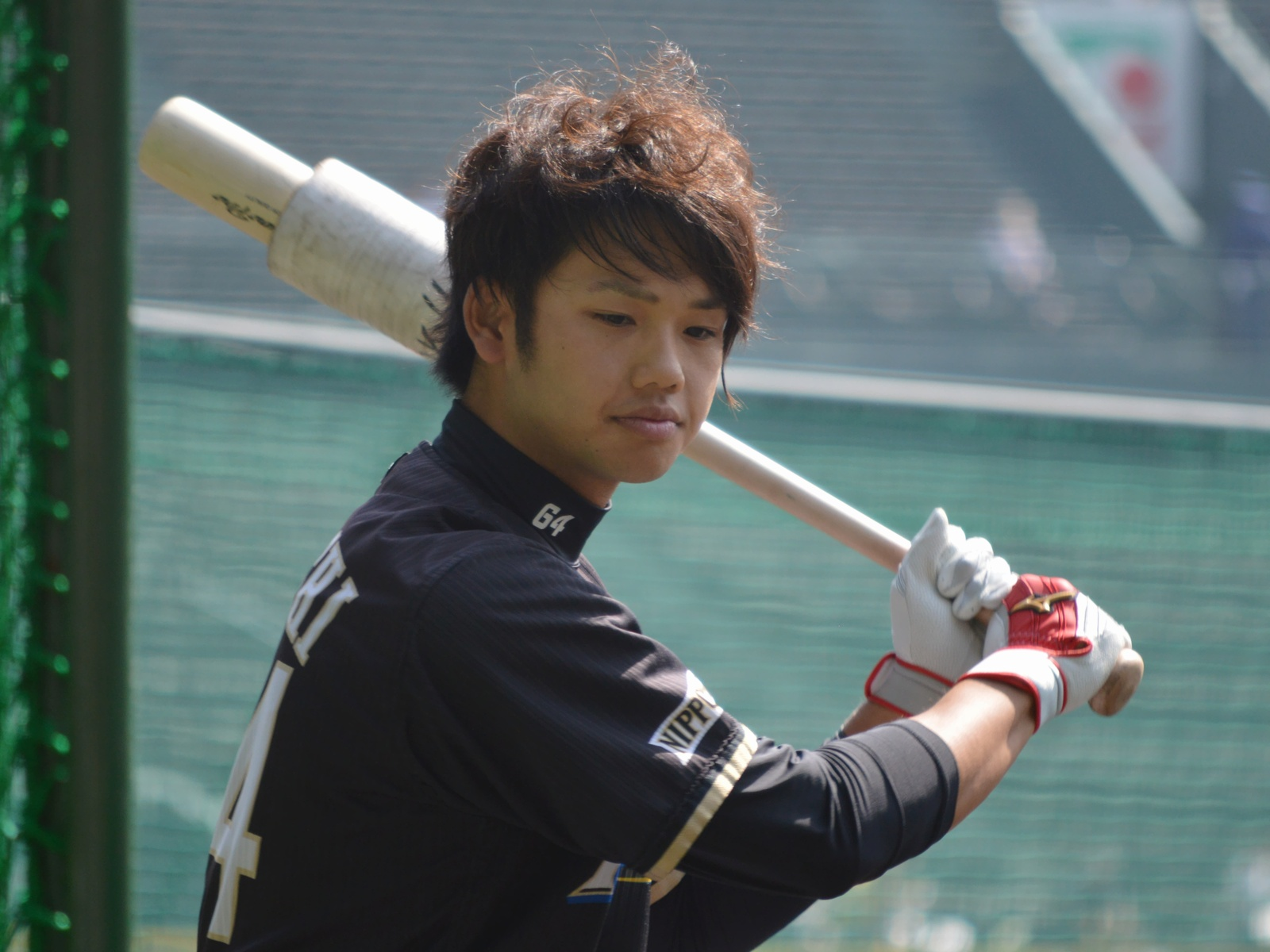
- Taniguchi with the Hokkaido Nippon Ham Fighters
- Outfielder
- Born: June 1, 1992 (age 34)
- Batted: Left Threw: Right

NPB debut
- September 4, 2012, for the Hokkaido Nippon-Ham Fighters

Last NPB appearance
- October 26, 2021, for the Hokkaido Nippon-Ham Fighters

Career statistics (through 2021 season)
- Batting average: .241
- Home runs: 7
- RBI: 42
- Stats at Baseball Reference

Teams
- Hokkaido Nippon-Ham Fighters (2011–2021)

Yuya Taniguchi (谷口 雄也, Taniguchi Yūya; born 1 June 1992) is a Japanese professional baseball player. He debuted in 2012 with the Hokkaido Nippon-Ham Fighters. He had 3 runs in 2013.
