= Ryo Hayashizaki =

Japanese baseball player (born 1988)

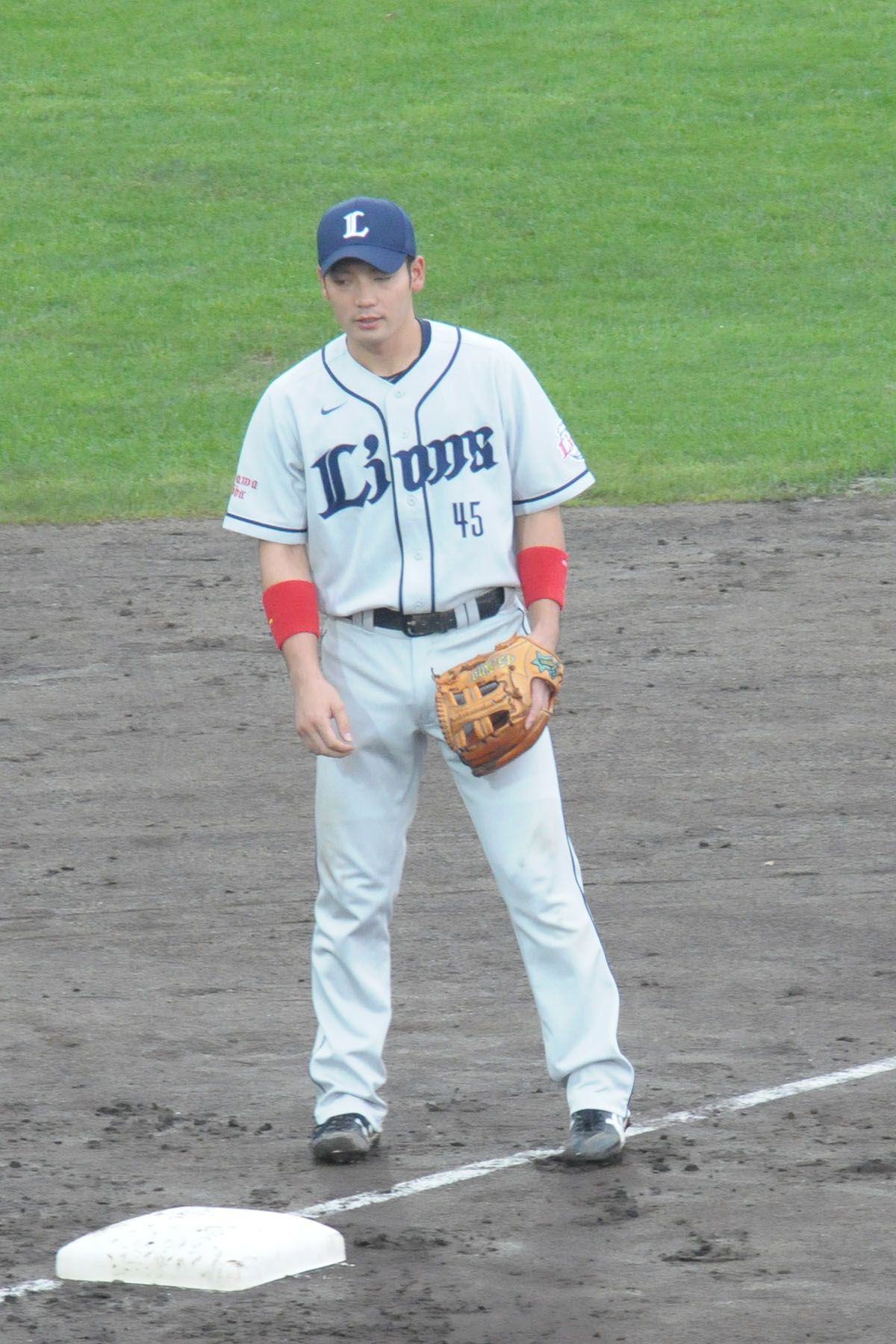
- Infielder
- Born: June 12, 1988 (age 37)
- Bats: Right Throws: Right
- Stats at Baseball Reference

Teams
- Saitama Seibu Lions (2011–2014)

Ryo Hayashizaki (born June 12, 1988) was a baseball infielder for the Saitama Seibu Lions of Nippon Professional Baseball.
