= Sho Aranami =

Japanese baseball player

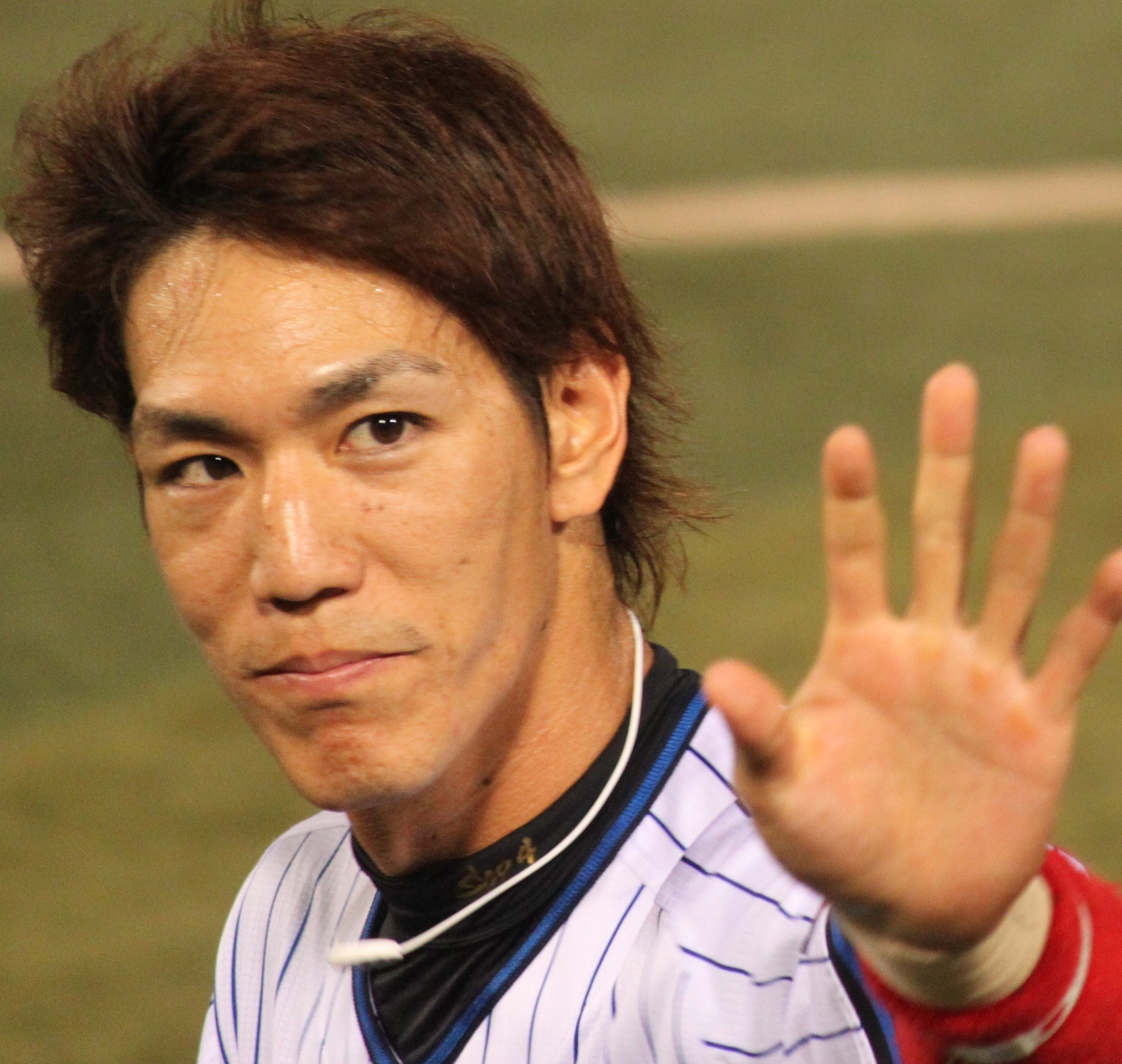
- Aranami with the Yokohama DeNA BayStars
- Outfielder
- Born: January 25, 1986 (age 40); Yokohama, Kanagawa, Japan
- Batted: Left Threw: Right

debut
- September 11, 2011, for the Yokohama BayStars

Last appearance
- 2019, for the Yokohama Bay Stars

Career statistics (through 2018 season)
- Batting average: .261
- Home runs: 10
- Stats at Baseball Reference

Teams
- Yokohama BayStars/Yokohama DeNA BayStars (2011–2018)

Career highlights and awards
- 2× Central League Golden Glove Award (2012, 2013)

Sho Aranami (荒波 翔, Aranami Sho; born January 25, 1986 in Yokohama, Kanagawa, Japan) is a former professional Japanese baseball player. He played outfield for the Yokohama DeNA BayStars.

== Away from baseball ==
She was joined SASUKE 38 at December 2020 and failed Stage 1 at Rolling Hill.
