= Kenichi Marumo =

Japanese baseball player

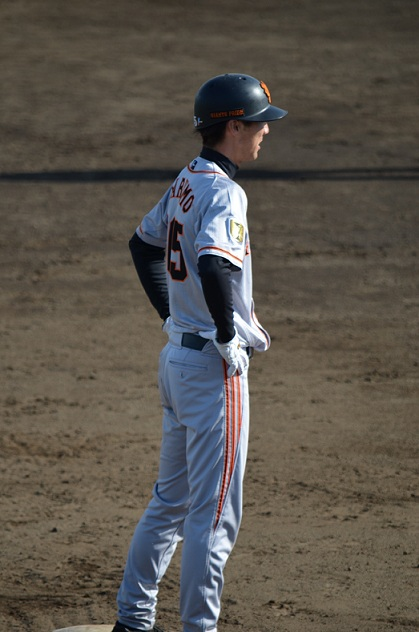
- Marumo playing for the Yomiuri Giants in May 2013
- Outfielder / Infielder
- Born: 丸毛 謙一; August 2, 1988 (age 37); Toyonaka, Osaka Prefecture, Japan
- Bats: Right Throws: Right

NPB debut
- Orix Buffaloes

Last NPB appearance
- Orix Buffaloes
- Stats at Baseball Reference

Teams
- Yomiuri Giants (2011–2013); Orix Buffaloes (2014–2015)

Kenichi Marumo (丸毛 謙一, Marumo Ken'ichi) (born August 2, 1988) is a Japanese retired professional baseball player. He spent three seasons with the Yomiuri Giants organization before signing with the Orix Buffaloes, where he spent two seasons. He made his only Nippon Professional Baseball first-team appearance for Orix in March 2014, before retiring due to injury during the 2015 season.

== Career ==
=== High school and university ===
Marumo was a member of the Osaka Tōin High School baseball club. In his final year, he was a member of the team that qualified for the 2006 national championships. He appeared as a pinch-hitter in the 9th inning of the team's second-round loss to Waseda Jitsugyo High School and was struck out by Yuki Saito.

After graduating high school he enrolled at the Osaka University of Economics and became a regular starting member of the university baseball team at the start of his second year. He played not only in the outfield but also as a third baseman. During his 4 years in the Kansai6 Baseball League, he played in a total of 88 matches and hit 4 home runs with a batting average of .227.

=== Professional career ===
In October 2010 Marumo was drafted by the Yomiuri Giants in the 8th round of the 2010 developmental player draft in the 2010 Nippon Professional Baseball draft. He was the 29th player selected in the development draft that followed the regular draft (in which 68 players were selected), making him the 97th (and final) player picked overall that year. In a press release following the draft, the Giants described Marumo as "has top-class leg strength and will steal a lot of bases".

==== Yomiuri Giants (2011–2013) ====
In 2011 Marumo played 11 matches for the Giants' farm team; he only had one plate appearance and was mainly used as a pinch runner, finishing with three stolen bases and four runs. During the post-season camp, he was given the opportunity to practice as an infielder.

In 2012, whilst registered as an outfielder, Marumo spent 57 games fielding at short stop, the most for the Giants' farm team. He played a total of 87 matches and had a batting average of .227 with 5 home runs and 15 stolen bases.

In 2013 Marumo batted in the number 4 position in all of the pre-season "training league" games and, in a rare event for a development player, started the first game of the farm team's Eastern League season in the number 4 position. In 88 games he had a .197 batting average and 10 stolen bases. At the end of the 2013 season, Marumo became a free agent on 31 October, having reached the maximum of three years as a development player prescribed in the rules governing development players. He was invited to the Orix Buffaloes post-season camp in Kōchi Prefecture and was acquired by the Buffaloes as a regular squad member on 16 November 2013, signing a contract with an estimated annual salary of 5.5 million yen the following month.

==== Orix Buffaloes (2014–2015) ====
Marumo impressed Orix manager Hiroshi Moriwaki with a steal in a pre-season match and started the 2014 season in the Buffaloes' first-team squad. On 28 March 2014 Marumo made his first-team debut in the Orix' opening game of the season against the Hokkaido Nippon-Ham Fighters. He appeared as a pinch runner in the top of the ninth inning and scored a run; he was then replaced by catcher Katsuki Yamazaki in the middle of the ninth inning. On 2 April he was dropped to the second-team squad. Marumo played 64 games for the farm team, finishing the season with a .277 batting average and 12 stolen bases.

On 5 February 2015 during the Orix pre-season camp, Marumo was struck in the left side of the head by a batted ball during fielding practice. He continued to practice, but complained of feeling unwell at the end of the session. He was taken to hospital and diagnosed with acute epidural hematoma and underwent an emergency craniotomy. He was discharged from hospital on 18 February to commence rehabilitation.

Although Marumo returned to batting practice and regained his abilities to the level they were before the accident, on 2 July 2015 he announced his retirement from professional baseball on advice from his doctor, citing that a second blow in the same spot could be life-threatening. The club accepted his resignation the same day. The following day he made his final appearance in a farm league match, starting the game in the number 5 batting position and fielding in left field against the Hiroshima Carp. He fielded in the top of the first inning only and took one catch; at the end of the Hiroshima inning he was greeted by both teams standing in front of their benches and was presented with a bouquet of flowers by veteran teammate Yoshitomo Tani. As his retirement was voluntary, a member of the Orix organization said Marumo would not be eligible for compensation for forced retirement due to injury; however, club president Ryōzō Setoyama announced Marumo would be joining the second-team staff.

His career ended having made one first-team appearance as a pinch runner and scoring one run, without ever making an appearance at the plate.

== Playing style ==
Marumo was noted for his leg speed, including being able to run 50 metres in 5.8 seconds. However, Orix manager Moriwaki also rated his hitting and fielding abilities, with the club expecting him to contribute as a utility infielder/outfielder.
