= Yuki Shichijo =

Japanese baseball player (born 1984)

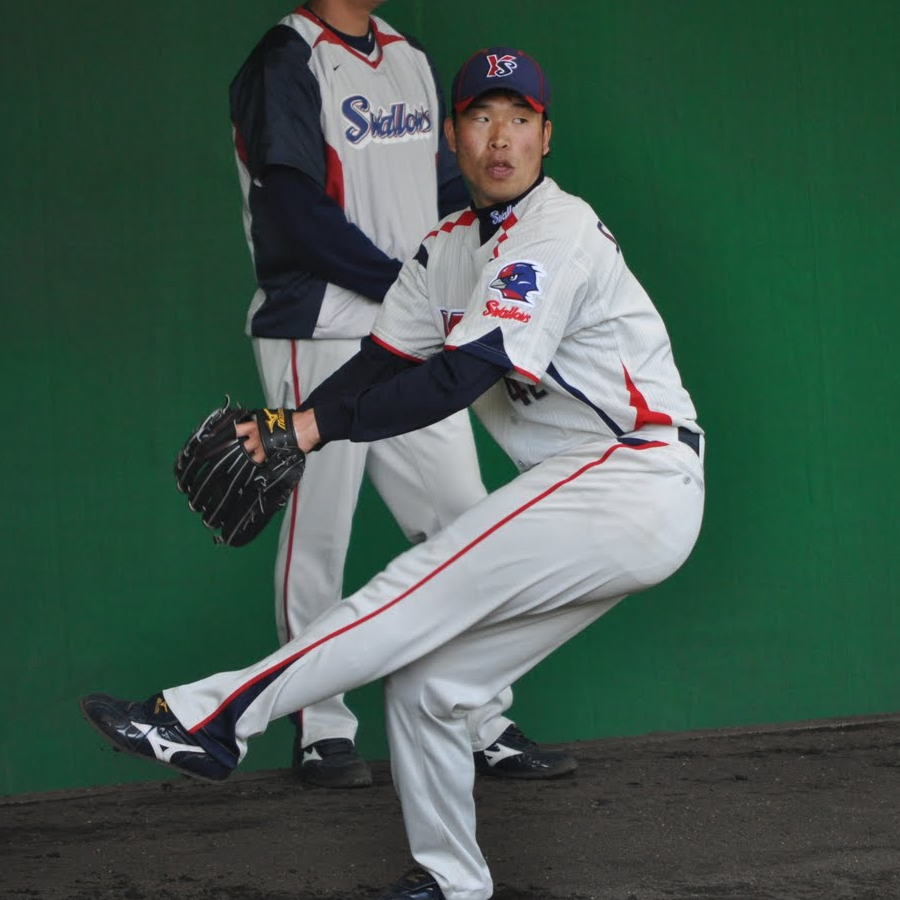
- Pitcher
- Born: July 10, 1984 (age 41); Higashiusuki District, Miyazaki, Japan
- Bats: Right Throws: Right

debut
- June 28, 2011, for the Tokyo Yakult Swallows
- Stats at Baseball Reference

Teams
- Tokyo Yakult Swallows (2011–2016)

Yuki Shichijo (七條 祐樹, Shichijō Yūki; born July 10, 1984 in Higashiusuki, Miyazaki, Japan) is a professional Japanese baseball player.
