= Yodai Enoshita =

Japanese professional baseball player

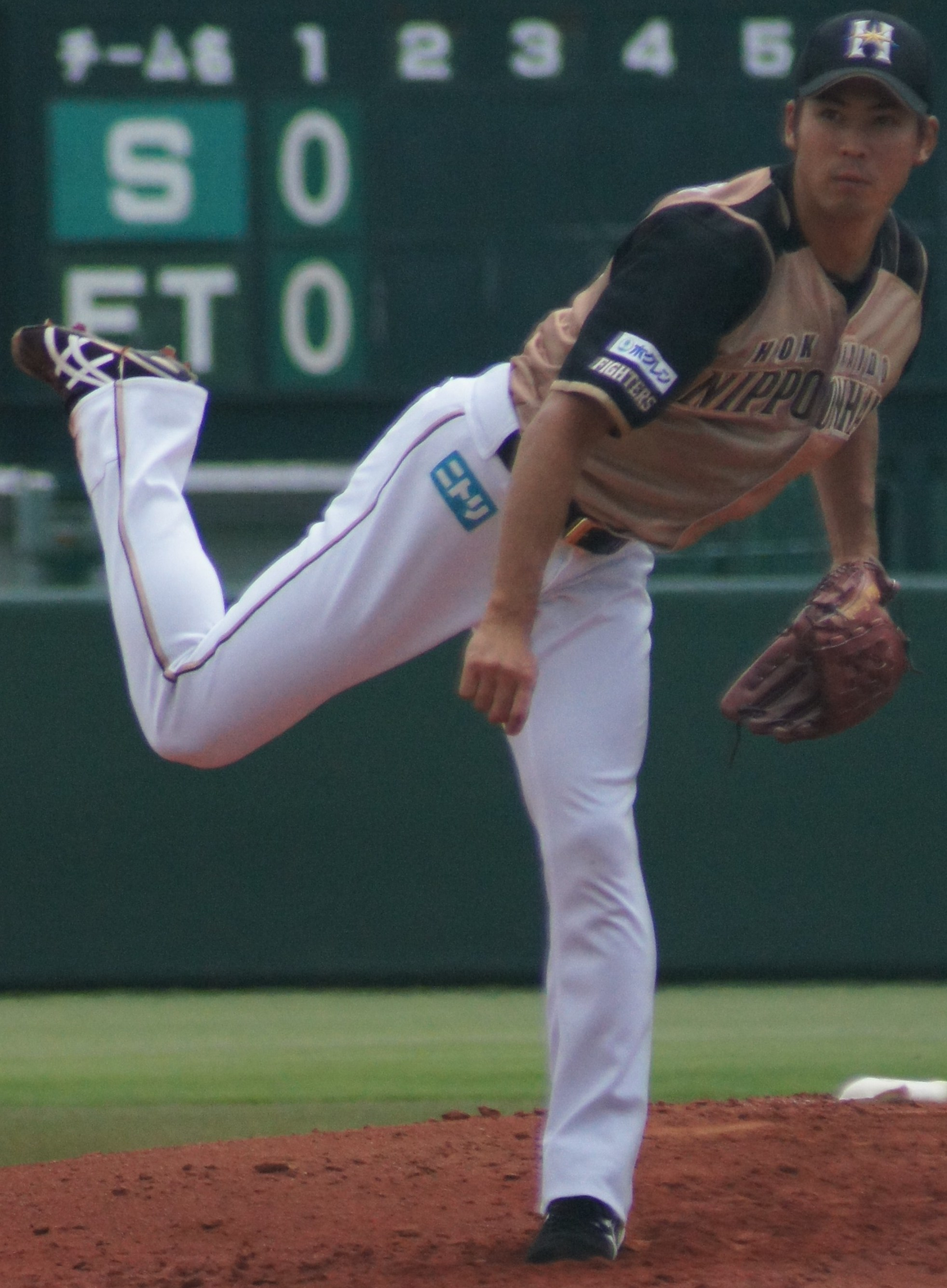
- Enoshita with the Hokkaido Nippon-Ham Fighters
- Pitcher
- Born: July 21, 1988 (age 37); Kagoshima, Japan
- Batted: Right Threw: Right

debut
- July 26, 2011, for the Hokkaido Nippon-Ham Fighters

Last appearance
- May 9, 2017, for the Hokkaido Nippon-Ham Fighters

Career statistics (through 2017 season)
- Win–loss record: 2–0
- ERA: 3.76
- Strikeouts: 37
- Stats at Baseball Reference

Teams
- Hokkaido Nippon-Ham Fighters (2011–2017)

Yodai Enoshita (榎下 陽大, Enoshita Yōdai) is a Japanese professional baseball player. He was born on July 21, 1988. He debuted in 2011. He had 9 strikeouts in 2013.
