= Shōtarō Koseki =

Japanese photographer

Shōtarō Koseki (小関 庄太郎, Koseki Shōtarō; 1907–2003) was a renowned Japanese photographer.
