= Shota Koike =

Japanese baseball player (born 1988)

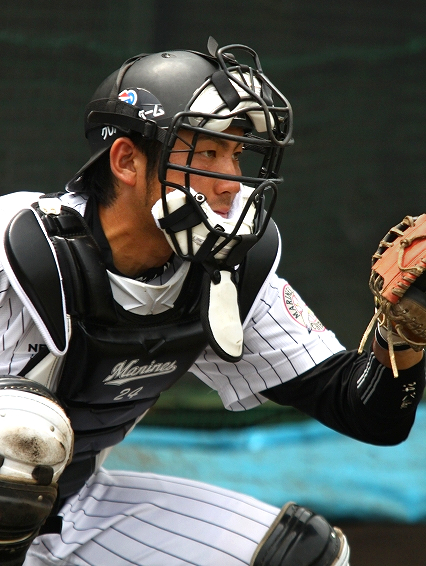
- Catcher
- Born: June 24, 1988 (age 37)
- Bats: Right Throws: Right

debut
- 2012, for the Chiba Lotte Marines

Career statistics (through 2012 season)
- Games played: 1
- At bats: 1
- Hit(s): 0

Teams
- Chiba Lotte Marines (2012)

Shota Koike (小池 翔大, Koike Shota) is a Japanese professional baseball catcher. He was born on June 24, 1988. He is currently playing for the Chiba Lotte Marines of the NPB.
