= Shota Ishimine =

Japanese baseball player (born 1988)

Shota Ishimine 伊志嶺 翔大
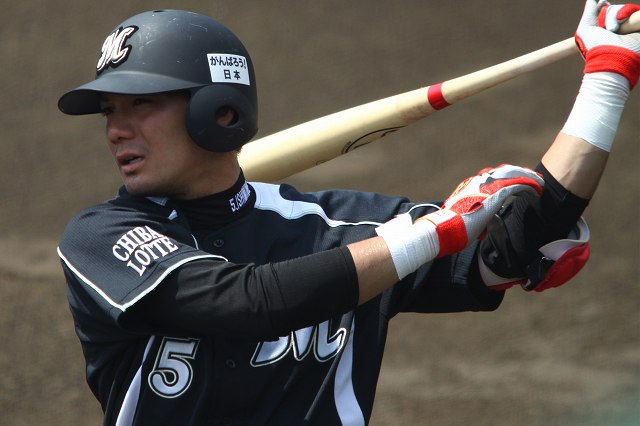
- Ishimine with the Chiba Lotte Marines

Chiba Lotte Marines – No. 74
- Outfielder / Coach
- Born: May 12, 1988 (age 37); Hirara, Okinawa, Japan
- Bats: Right Throws: Right

NPB debut
- April 14, 2011, for the Chiba Lotte Marines

NPB statistics (through 2018 season)
- Batting average: .242
- Home runs: 6
- RBIs: 59
- Stats at Baseball Reference

Teams
- As player: Chiba Lotte Marines (2011–2019); As coach: Chiba Lotte Marines (2020–present)

Shota Ishimine (伊志嶺 翔大, born May 12, 1988) is a professional baseball outfielder for the Chiba Lotte Marines of the Pacific League in Nippon Professional Baseball.

Ishimine attended Tokai University. He competed for the Japanese national baseball team in the 2010 World University Baseball Championship, being named an All-Tournament outfielder, along with Mikie Mahtook and Yoenis Céspedes.
