= Fumiya Araki =

Japanese baseball player

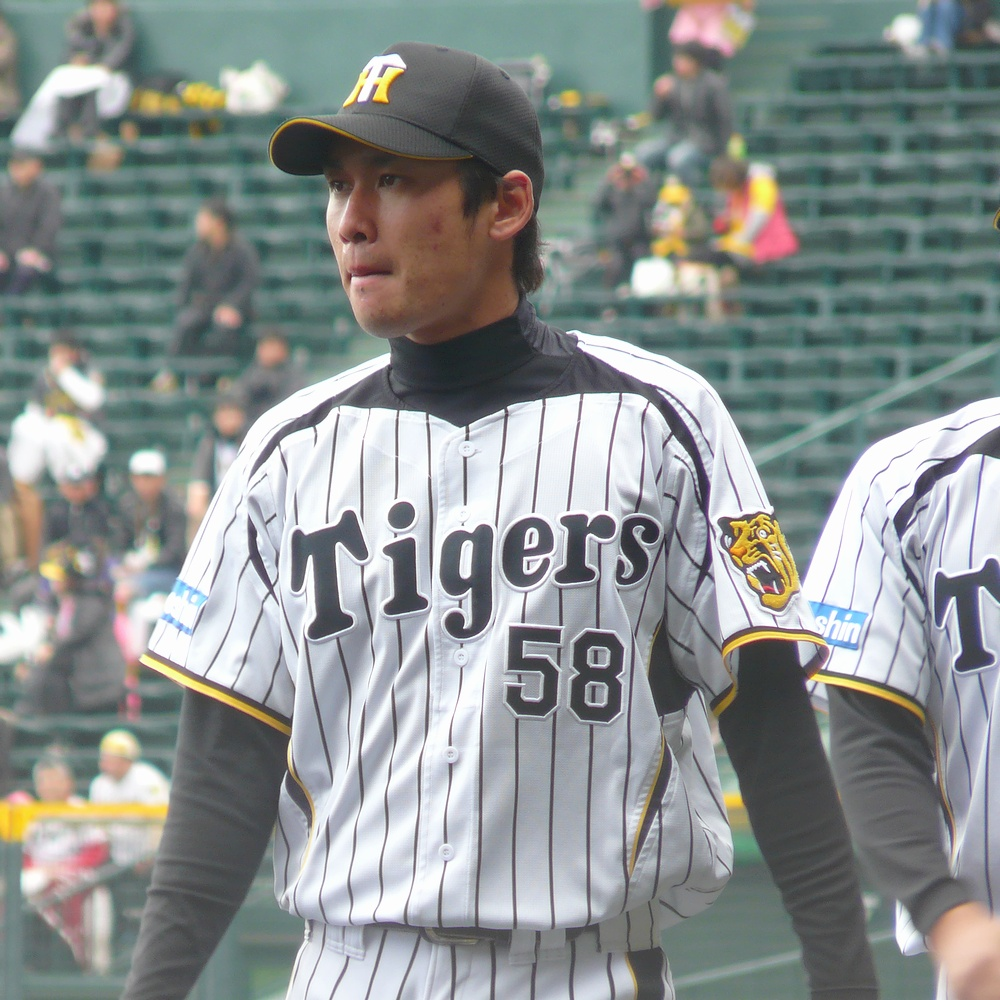
- Araki with the Hanshin Tigers

Hanshin Tigers – No. 58
- Middle Infielder
- Born: April 25, 1988 (age 37); Tokyo, Tokyo Prefecture, Japan
- Bats: Left Throws: Right

NPB debut
- May 20, 2011, for the Hanshin Tigers

NPB statistics (through 2020 season)
- Batting average: .182
- Home runs: 0
- Hits: 26
- RBI: 2
- Stolen bases: 14
- Stats at Baseball Reference

Teams
- Hanshin Tigers (2011, 2013–present)

Fumiya Araki (Japanese 荒木 郁也; born 25 April 1988) is a Japanese professional baseball infielder who currently plays for the Hanshin Tigers of Nippon Professional Baseball.
