= Kisho Kagami =

Japanese baseball player

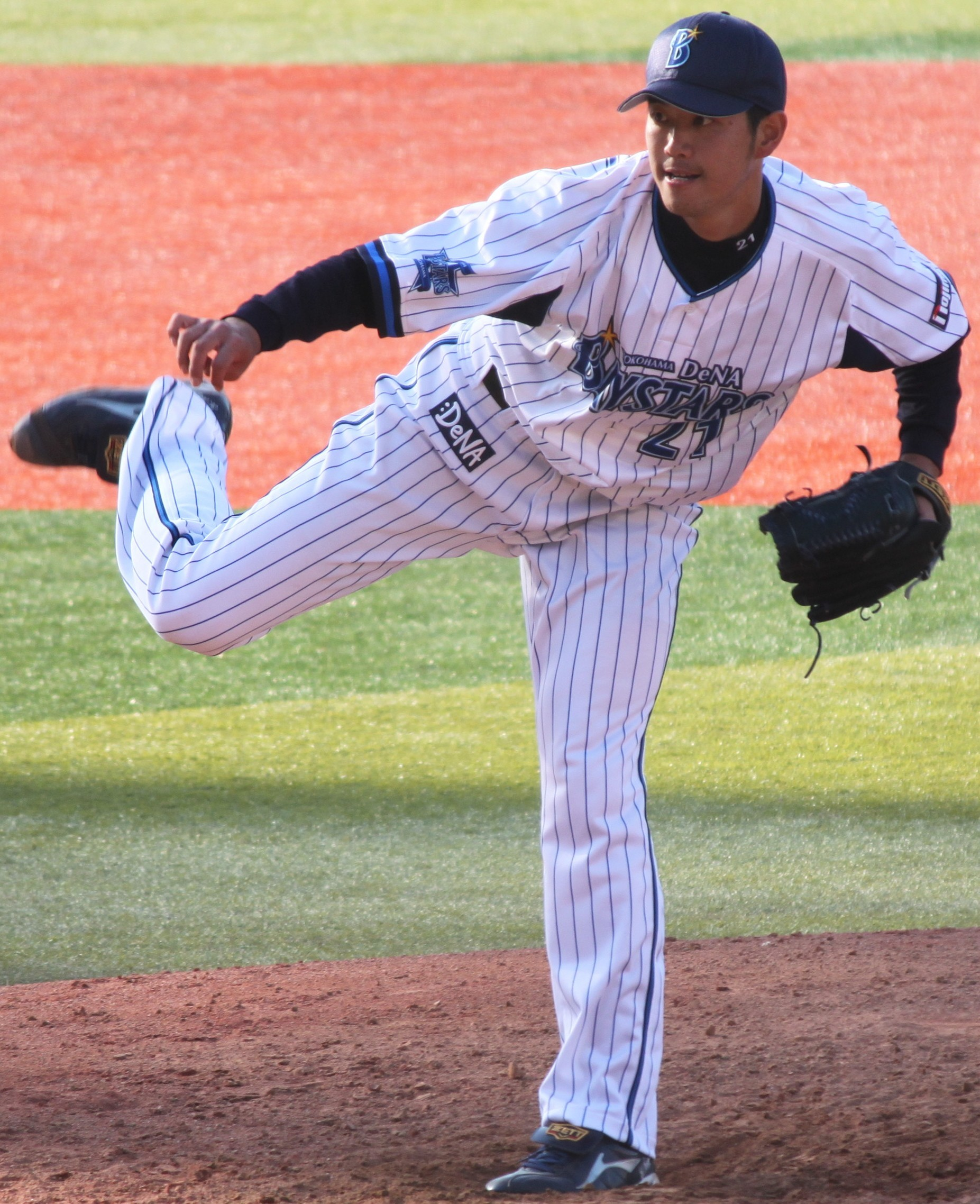
- Kagami with the Yokohama DeNA BayStars
- Pitcher
- Born: September 5, 1988 (age 37); Kamakura, Kanagawa, Japan
- Bats: Right Throws: Right

debut
- October 19, 2011, for the Yokohama BayStars
- Stats at Baseball Reference

Teams
- Yokohama BayStars/Yokohama DeNA BayStars (2011–2015)

Kisho Kagami (加賀美 希昇, Kagami Kisho; born September 5, 1988) is a professional Japanese baseball player.
