= Shohei Tsukahara =

Japanese baseball player

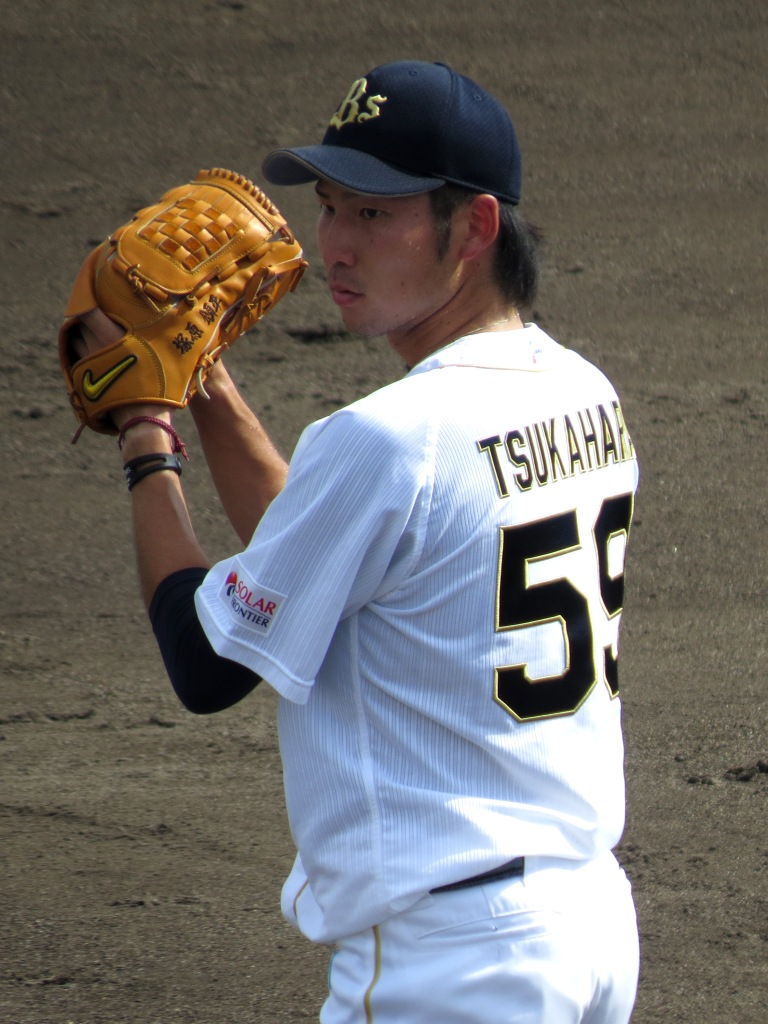
- Tsukahara with the Orix Buffaloes
- Pitcher
- Born: July 8, 1992 (age 33); Yūki, Ibaraki, Japan
- Bats: Left Throws: Right

NPB debut
- April 24, 2012, for the Orix Buffaloes

NPB statistics (through 2016 season)
- Win–loss: 5–6
- ERA: 3.12
- Strikeouts: 90
- Stats at Baseball Reference

Teams
- Orix Buffaloes (2011–2019)

Career highlights and awards
- 1× NPB All-Star (2016)

Shohei Tsukahara (塚原 頌平, Tsukahara Shohei; born July 8, 1992 in Yūki, Ibaraki, Japan) is a Japanese professional baseball pitcher for the Orix Buffaloes in Japan's Nippon Professional Baseball.
