= Tatsuya Oishi (baseball) =

Japanese baseball player (born 1988)

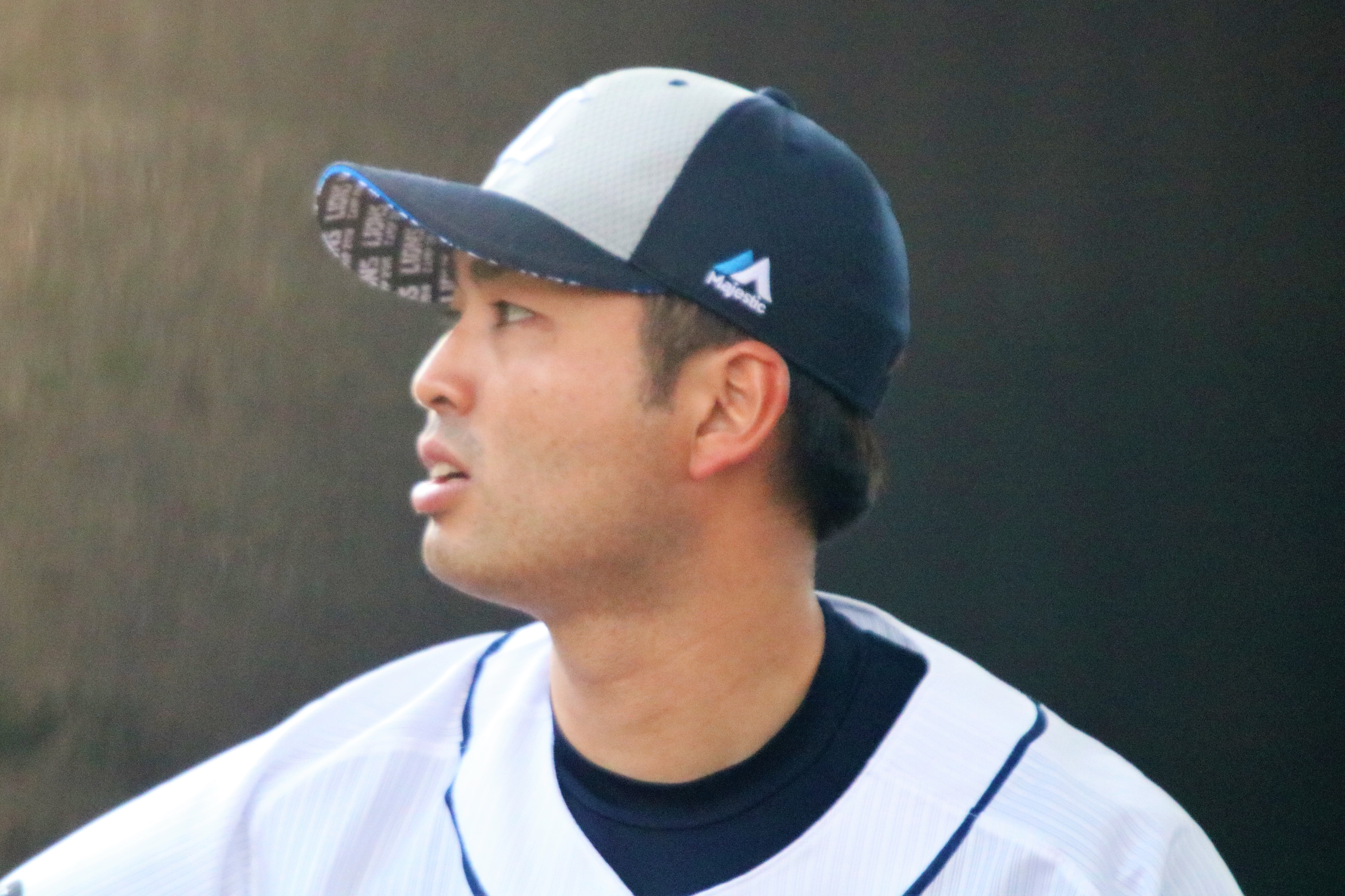
- Oishi in 2018

Saitama Seibu Lions – No. 95
- Pitcher / Coach
- Born: October 10, 1988 (age 37)
- Bats: Left Throws: Right

NPB debut
- April 5, 2012, for the Saitama Seibu Lions

NPB statistics
- Win–loss record: 1-6
- Earned run average: 4.29
- Strikeouts: 72
- Stats at Baseball Reference

Teams
- As player: Saitama Seibu Lions (2012–2019); As coach: Saitama Seibu Lions (2021–present)

Tatsuya Oishi (大石 達也, Ōishi Tatsuya; born October 10, 1988 in Dazaifu, Fukuoka) is a Japanese former professional baseball pitcher and current coach for the Saitama Seibu Lions of Nippon Professional Baseball.
