= 2012 Central League Climax Series =

First stage
Team (Wins)		Manager	Season
Chunichi Dragons (2)		Morimichi Takagi	75–53–16 (.586), 10.5 GB
Tokyo Yakult Swallows (1)		Junji Ogawa	68–65–11 (.511), 20 GB
- Dates: October 13–15

Final stage
Team (Wins)		Manager	Season
Yomiuri Giants (4)		Tatsunori Hara	86–43–15 (.667), 10.5 GA
Chunichi Dragons (3)		Morimichi Takagi	75–53–16 (.586), 10.5 GB
- Dates: October 17–22
- MVP: Yoshihito Ishii (Yomiuri)

The 2012 Central League Climax Series (CLCS) consisted of two consecutive series, Stage 1 being a best-of-three series and Stage 2 being a best-of-six with the top seed being awarded a one-win advantage. The winner of the series advanced to the 2012 Japan Series, where they competed against the 2012 Pacific League Climax Series (PLCS) winner. The top three regular-season finishers played in the two series. The CLCS began on with the first game of Stage 1 on October 13 and ended with the final game of Stage 2 on October 22.

== First stage ==
=== Summary ===
Chunichi Dragons won the series, 2–1.

Game	Date	Score	Location	Time	Attendance
1	October 13	Tokyo Yakult Swallows – 1, Chunichi Dragons – 6	Nagoya Dome	3:11	31,146
2	October 14	Tokyo Yakult Swallows – 1, Chunichi Dragons – 0	Nagoya Dome	3:26	33,852
3	October 15	Tokyo Yakult Swallows – 1, Chunichi Dragons – 4	Nagoya Dome	3:39	23,264

=== Game 1 ===
Saturday, October 13, 2012, 2:00 pm (JST) at Nagoya Dome in Nagoya, Aichi Prefecture
Team	1	2	3	4	5	6	7	8	9	R	H	E
Yakult	0	0	0	0	0	0	1	0	0	1	5	0
Chunichi	0	0	0	2	0	1	3	0	X	6	11	0
WP: Kenichi Nakata (1–0) LP: Masanori Ishikawa (0–1) Sv: Daisuke Yamai (1); Home runs: YAK: Wladimir Balentien (1); CHU: Kazuhiro Wada (1)

=== Game 2 ===
Sunday, October 14, 2012, 2:01 pm (JST) at Nagoya Dome in Nagoya, Aichi Prefecture
Team	1	2	3	4	5	6	7	8	9	R	H	E
Yakult	0	0	0	1	0	0	0	0	0	1	5	0
Chunichi	0	0	0	0	0	0	0	0	0	0	5	1
WP: Shohei Tateyama (1–0) LP: Soma Yamauchi (0–1) Sv: Tony Barnette (1); Home runs: YAK: Wladimir Balentien (2); CHU: None

=== Game 3 ===
Monday, October 15, 2012, 6:01 pm (JST) at Nagoya Dome in Nagoya, Aichi Prefecture
Team	1	2	3	4	5	6	7	8	9	R	H	E
Yakult	0	1	0	0	0	0	0	0	0	1	6	1
Chunichi	0	0	0	0	0	0	0	4	X	4	7	0
WP: Takuya Asao (1–0) LP: Tetsuya Yamamoto (0–1); Home runs: YAK: None; CHU: Tony Blanco (1)

== Final stage ==
=== Summary ===
Yomiuri Giants won the series, 4–3*.

Game	Date	Score	Location	Time	Attendance
1	October 17	Chunichi Dragons – 3, Yomiuri Giants – 1	Tokyo Dome	3:21	40,039
2	October 18	Chunichi Dragons – 5, Yomiuri Giants – 2	Tokyo Dome	3:40	39,135
3	October 19	Chunichi Dragons – 5, Yomiuri Giants – 4 (10)	Tokyo Dome	3:41	44,744
4	October 20	Chunichi Dragons – 1, Yomiuri Giants – 3	Tokyo Dome	2:57	46,158
5	October 21	Chunichi Dragons – 2, Yomiuri Giants – 3	Tokyo Dome	3:40	45,897
6	October 22	Chunichi Dragons – 2, Yomiuri Giants – 4	Tokyo Dome	3:18	44,351

* The Central League regular season champion is given a one-game advantage in the Final Stage.

=== Game 1 ===
Wednesday, October 17, 2012, 6:00 pm (JST) at Tokyo Dome in Bunkyō, Tokyo
Team	1	2	3	4	5	6	7	8	9	R	H	E
Chunichi	0	0	1	0	0	1	0	0	1	3	9	0
Yomiuri	0	0	0	1	0	0	0	0	0	1	5	0
WP: Yudai Ono (1–0) LP: Tetsuya Utsumi (0–1) Sv: Daisuke Yamai (1)

=== Game 2 ===
Thursday, October 18, 2012, 6:01 pm (JST) at Tokyo Dome in Bunkyō, Tokyo
Team	1	2	3	4	5	6	7	8	9	R	H	E
Chunichi	0	2	0	1	0	1	0	0	1	5	11	0
Yomiuri	1	0	0	0	0	0	0	1	0	2	6	0
WP: Junki Ito (1–0) LP: D. J. Houlton (0–1) Sv: Daisuke Yamai (2); Home runs: CHU: Yohei Oshima (1); YOM: None

=== Game 3 ===
Friday, October 19, 2012, 6:01 pm (JST) at Tokyo Dome in Bunkyō, Tokyo
Team	1	2	3	4	5	6	7	8	9	10	R	H	E
Chunichi	0	2	1	0	0	1	0	0	0	1	5	11	0
Yomiuri	0	1	0	1	0	2	0	0	0	0	4	7	0
WP: Yuta Muto (1–0) LP: Kentaro Nishimura (0–1) Sv: Hitoki Iwase (1); Home runs: CHU: Kazuhiro Wada (1); YOM: Shuichi Murata (1), Yoshinobu Takahashi (1)

=== Game 4 ===
Saturday, October 20, 2012, 6:01 pm (JST) at Tokyo Dome in Bunkyō, Tokyo
Team	1	2	3	4	5	6	7	8	9	R	H	E
Chunichi	0	0	0	0	0	0	1	0	0	1	11	0
Yomiuri	0	0	2	0	0	0	0	1	X	3	6	0
WP: Hirokazu Sawamura (1–0) LP: Kenshin Kawakami (0–1) Sv: Kentaro Nishimura (1)

=== Game 5 ===
Sunday, October 21, 2012, 6:01 pm (JST) at Tokyo Dome in Bunkyō, Tokyo
Team	1	2	3	4	5	6	7	8	9	R	H	E
Chunichi	0	0	0	0	2	0	0	0	0	2	8	0
Yomiuri	0	2	0	0	0	0	0	0	1	3	10	0
WP: Scott Mathieson (1–0) LP: Hitoki Iwase (0–1); Home runs: CHU: Tony Blanco (1); YOM: None

=== Game 6 ===
Monday, October 22, 2012, 6:01 pm (JST) at Tokyo Dome in Bunkyō, Tokyo
Team	1	2	3	4	5	6	7	8	9	R	H	E
Chunichi	0	0	0	0	0	1	0	0	1	2	8	0
Yomiuri	0	3	0	0	1	0	0	0	X	4	10	0
WP: D. J. Houlton (1–1) LP: Junki Ito (1–1) Sv: Kentaro Nishimura (2); Home runs: CHU: None; YOM: Shuichi Murata (2)
