= Tetsuya =

- Pronunciation: tetsɯja (IPA)
- Gender: Male

Origin
- Origin: Japanese
- Meaning: Different depending on the kanji
- Region of origin: Japanese

Other names
- Alternative spelling: Tetuya (Kunrei-shiki) Tetuya (Nihon-shiki) Tetsuya (Hepburn)

Tetsuya is a masculine Japanese given name.

== Written forms ==
Tetsuya can be written using different kanji characters and can mean:

- 哲也, "philosophy, to be"
- 鉄也, "iron, to be"
- 哲哉, "philosophy, alas"
- 徹也, "devotion, to be"
- 徹矢, "penetrate, arrow"
- 鉄弥, "iron, increasingly"

The name can also be written in hiragana てつや or katakana テツヤ.

== People with the name ==
- Tetsuya (dancer) (born 1981), Japanese dancer
- Tetsuya (musician) (born 1969), Japanese musician
- Tetsuya Asano (浅野 哲也, born 1967) is a former Japanese football player and manager
- Tetsuya Chiba (てつや, born 1939), Japanese manga artist
- Tetsuya Chikushi (哲也, 1935–2008), Japanese newscaster
- Tetsuya Endo (disambiguation), multiple people
- Tetsuya Enomoto (哲也, born 1983), Japanese football player
- Tetsuya Fujii (哲也), a Japanese astronomer
- Tetsuya Fujimori (藤森 哲也; born 1987), Japanese shogi player
- Tetsuya Theodore "Ted" Fujita (哲也, 1920–1998), Japanese severe storms researcher
- Tetsuya Funatsu (舩津 徹也; born 1987), Japanese football player
- Tetsuya Harada (哲也, born 1970), Japanese former GP motorcycle racer
- Tetsuya Hibino (哲也, born 1974), Japanese professional drifting driver
- Tetsuya Ichimura (哲也, born 1930), Japanese photographer
- Tetsuya Ishida (徹也, 1973–2005), Japanese painter
- Tetsuya Ito (伊藤 哲也; born 1970), Japanese footballer
- Tetsuya Iwanaga (哲哉, born 1970), Japanese voice actor
- Tetsuya Kajiwara (drummer) (徹也, born 1963), Japanese drummer
- Tetsuya Kakihara (徹也, born 1982), Japanese voice actor
- Tetsuya Kakiuchi (垣内 哲也, born 1970) is a Japanese former Nippon Professional Baseball outfielder
- Tetsuya Kiyonari (哲也, born 1961), Japanese professional Go player
- Tetsuya Koishi (小石 哲也; born 1990), Japanese footballer
- Tetsuya Kokubo (小窪 哲也; born 1985), Japanese baseball player
- Tetsuya Komuro (哲哉, born 1958), Japanese keyboardist, songwriter and music producer
- Tetsuya Kumakawa (熊川 哲也; born 1972), Japanese ballet dancer
- Tetsuya Makita (哲也, born 1984), Japanese actor
- Tetsuya Matoyama (哲也, born 1970), Japanese professional baseball catcher
- Tetsuya Matsumoto (松本 哲也; born 1984), Japanese baseball player
- Tetsuya Mizuguchi (哲也, born 1965), Japanese video game designer and producer
- Tetsuya Murayama (村山 哲也; born 1974), Japanese football manager
- Tetsuya Naito (哲也, born 1982), Japanese professional wrestler
- Tetsuya Nakashima (哲也, born 1959), Japanese film director
- Nishikigi Tetsuya (錦木 徹也; born 1990), Japanese sumo wrestler
- Tetsuya Noda (野田 哲也; born 1940), Japanese artist, printmaker and educator
- Tetsuya Nomura (哲也, born 1970), Japanese video game director
- Tetsuya Ōkubo (大久保 哲哉, born 1980) is a Japanese football player
- Tetsuya Ota (哲也, born 1959), Japanese racecar driver
- Tetsuya Saito (斉藤 哲也; born 1983), Japanese ice hockey player
- Tetsuya Saruwatari (哲也, born 1958), Japanese manga artist
- Tetsuya Shibata (徹也, born 1973), video game music composer
- Tetsuya Shimizu (清水 哲也, born 1983), Japanese professional wrestler
- Tetsuya Shikawa 鉄也, Japanese politician
- Tetsuya Shiroo (哲彌, 1948–2020), Japanese yakuza
- Tetsuya Takahashi (哲哉, born 1966), Japanese video game creator
- Tetsuya Takeda (鉄矢), Japanese singer and actor
- Tetsuya Takehora (竹洞哲也, born 1974) is a Japanese film director and screenwriter.
- Tetsuya Tanaka (田中哲也, born 1965) is a Japanese racing driver
- Tetsuya Totsuka (戸塚 哲也; born 1961), Japanese footballer and manager
- Tetsuya Utsumi (内海 哲也, born 1982) is a Japanese professional baseball player
- Tetsuya Wakuda (哲也, born 1959), Japanese-born Australian chef
- Tetsuya Watari (哲也, 1941–2020), Japanese stage, film, and television actor
- Tetsuya Yamagami (山上 徹也), the only suspect in the assassination of former prime minister Shinzo Abe
- Tetsuya Yamaguchi (山口 鉄也; born 1983), Japanese baseball player
- Tetsuya Yamamoto (山本 哲哉; born 1985), Japanese baseball player
- Tetsuya Yanagisawa (テツヤ), Japanese anime director
- Tetsuya Yoneda (哲也, born 1938), Japanese professional baseball pitcher
- Tetsuya Yoroizaka (鎧坂 哲哉; born 1990), Japanese long-distance runner

== Fictional characters ==
- Tetsuya Azuma (鉄也), protagonist of the 1973 anime series Casshan and of the 2004 film Casshern
- Tetsuya Kajiwara (Fushigi Yūgi) (哲也), in the manga and anime series Fushigi Yūgi
- Tetsuya Kuroko (黒子 テツヤ), the protagonist of the manga and anime series Kuroko's Basketball
- Tetsuya Sendo, a friend of Ritsu Kasanoda in the manga and anime series Ouran High School Host Club
- Tetsuya Takahashi, in Haruki Murakami's novel After Dark
- Tetsuya Tsurugi (鉄也), the protagonist of manga and anime series Great Mazinger
- Tetsuya Watarigani, a recurring character in the anime series Beyblade: Metal Fusion
- Tetsuya Yuuki (哲也), in the manga and anime series Ace of Diamond
- Tetsuya, Japanese name of Tyson from Pokémon: Advanced Battle
- Tetsuya Yano, a character from Choujuu Sentai Liveman
- Tetsuya from Yokai Watch

== See also ==
- 4343 Tetsuya, a main-belt asteroid
- Legendary Gambler Tetsuya, a gambling manga
- Tetsuya's, a restaurant in Sydney, Australia
