= 2011 Central League Climax Series =

First stage
Team (Wins)		Manager	Season
Tokyo Yakult Swallows (2)		Junji Ogawa	70–59–15 (.543), 2.5 GB
Yomiuri Giants (1)		Tatsunori Hara	71–62–11 (.534), 3.5 GB
- Dates: October 29–31

Final stage
Team (Wins)		Manager	Season
Chunichi Dragons (4)		Hiromitsu Ochiai	75–59–10 (.560), 2.5 GA
Tokyo Yakult Swallows (2)		Junji Ogawa	70–59–15 (.543), 2.5 GB
- Dates: November 2–6
- MVP: Kazuki Yoshimi (Chunichi)

The 2011 Central League Climax Series (CLCS) consisted of two consecutive series, Stage 1 being a best-of-three series and Stage 2 being a best-of-six with the top seed being awarded a one-win advantage. The winner of the series advanced to the 2011 Japan Series, where they competed against the 2011 Pacific League Climax Series (PLCS) winner. The top three regular-season finishers played in the two series. The CLCS began on with the first game of Stage 1 on October 29 and ended with the final game of Stage 2 on October 23.

== First stage ==
=== Summary ===
Tokyo Yakult Swallows won the series, 2–1.

Game	Date	Score	Location	Time	Attendance
1	October 29	Yomiuri Giants – 2, Tokyo Yakult Swallows – 3	Meiji Jingu Stadium	3:28	32,339
2	October 30	Yomiuri Giants – 6, Tokyo Yakult Swallows – 2	Meiji Jingu Stadium	3:24	32,148
3	October 31	Yomiuri Giants – 1, Tokyo Yakult Swallows – 3	Meiji Jingu Stadium	2:51	31,687

=== Game 1 ===
Saturday, October 29, 2011, 6:31 pm (JST) at Meiji Jingu Stadium in Shinjuku, Tokyo
Team	1	2	3	4	5	6	7	8	9	R	H	E
Yomiuri	0	0	0	1	0	0	0	0	1	2	8	1
Yakult	0	0	0	0	1	2	0	0	X	3	8	0
WP: Kyohei Muranaka (1–0) LP: Yasunari Takagi (0–1) Sv: Lim Chang-Yong (1); Home runs: YOM: Saburo Omura (1); YAK: None

=== Game 2 ===
Sunday, October 30, 2011, 6:30 pm (JST) at Meiji Jingu Stadium in Shinjuku, Tokyo
Team	1	2	3	4	5	6	7	8	9	R	H	E
Yomiuri	0	0	0	1	1	0	0	0	4	6	9	0
Yakult	0	0	0	0	1	0	0	0	1	2	7	0
WP: Tetsuya Utsumi (1–0) LP: Masanori Ishikawa (0–1); Home runs: YOM: Shinnosuke Abe (1); YAK: None

=== Game 3 ===
Monday, October 31, 2011, 6:30 pm (JST) at Meiji Jingu Stadium in Shinjuku, Tokyo
Team	1	2	3	4	5	6	7	8	9	R	H	E
Yomiuri	0	0	0	0	0	0	0	0	1	1	6	2
Yakult	0	0	1	0	0	0	1	1	X	3	7	0
WP: Katsuki Akagawa (1–0) LP: Dicky Gonzalez (0–1) Sv: Kyohei Muranaka (1); Home runs: YOM: Michihiro Ogasawara (1); YAK: Ryoji Aikawa (1)

== Final stage ==
=== Summary ===
Chunichi Dragons won the series, 4–2*.

Game	Date	Score	Location	Time	Attendance
1	November 2	Tokyo Yakult Swallows – 1, Chunichi Dragons – 2	Nagoya Dome	3:05	34,689
2	November 3	Tokyo Yakult Swallows – 3, Chunichi Dragons – 1	Nagoya Dome	2:53	38,414
3	November 4	Tokyo Yakult Swallows – 2, Chunichi Dragons – 1	Nagoya Dome	3:50	37,599
4	November 5	Tokyo Yakult Swallows – 1, Chunichi Dragons – 5	Nagoya Dome	3:08	38,342
5	November 6	Tokyo Yakult Swallows – 1, Chunichi Dragons – 2	Nagoya Dome	2:51	38,252

* The Central League regular season champion is given a one-game advantage in the Final Stage.

=== Game 1 ===
Wednesday, November 2, 2011, 6:00 pm (JST) at Nagoya Dome in Nagoya, Aichi Prefecture
Team	1	2	3	4	5	6	7	8	9	R	H	E
Yakult	0	0	0	0	0	0	0	1	0	1	6	0
Chunichi	1	0	1	0	0	0	0	0	X	2	7	0
WP: Kazuki Yoshimi (1–0) LP: Tatsuyoshi Masubuchi (0–1) Sv: Hitoki Iwase (1)

=== Game 2 ===
Thursday, November 3, 2011, 6:01 pm (JST) at Nagoya Dome in Nagoya, Aichi Prefecture
Team	1	2	3	4	5	6	7	8	9	R	H	E
Yakult	0	0	0	0	0	0	0	1	2	3	7	0
Chunichi	0	0	0	0	0	0	0	0	1	1	2	0
WP: Masanori Ishikawa (1–0) LP: Wei-Yin Chen (0–1) Sv: Shohei Tateyama (1); Home runs: YAK: Yasushi Iihara (1); CHU: Masahiko Morino (1)

=== Game 3 ===
Friday, November 4, 2011, 6:00 pm (JST) at Nagoya Dome in Nagoya, Aichi Prefecture
Team	1	2	3	4	5	6	7	8	9	R	H	E
Yakult	0	1	0	0	1	0	0	0	0	2	7	0
Chunichi	0	0	0	1	0	0	0	0	0	1	5	0
WP: Tony Barnette (1–0) LP: Daisuke Yamai (0–1) Sv: Lim Chang-Yong (1)

=== Game 4 ===
Saturday, November 5, 2011, 6:00 pm (JST) at Nagoya Dome in Nagoya, Aichi Prefecture
Team	1	2	3	4	5	6	7	8	9	R	H	E
Yakult	0	0	1	0	1	0	0	0	0	1	5	2
Chunichi	4	0	0	0	1	0	0	0	X	5	8	1
WP: Yudai Kawai (1–0) LP: Katsuki Akagawa (0–1); Home runs: YAK: None; CHU: Tony Blanco (1)

=== Game 5 ===
Sunday, November 6, 2011, 6:00 pm (JST) at Nagoya Dome in Nagoya, Aichi Prefecture
Team	1	2	3	4	5	6	7	8	9	R	H	E
Yakult	0	0	0	0	0	0	0	0	1	1	5	0
Chunichi	0	0	0	0	0	2	0	0	X	2	3	0
WP: Kazuki Yoshimi (2–0) LP: Shohei Tateyama (0–1) Sv: Takuya Asao (1); Home runs: YAK: None; CHU: Hirokazu Ibata (1)
