= Tatsuyoshi =

- Gender: Male

Origin
- Origin: Japanese
- Meaning: Different meanings depending on the kanji used

Tatsuyoshi (written: 辰義 or 竜義) is a masculine Japanese given name. Notable people with the name include:

- Tatsuyoshi Ishihara (石原 辰義; born 1964), Japanese speed skater
- Tatsuyoshi Masubuchi (増渕 竜義; born 1988), Japanese baseball player

Tatsuyoshi (written: 辰吉) is also a Japanese surname. Notable people with the surname include:

- Joichiro Tatsuyoshi (辰吉 丈一郎; born 1970), Japanese boxer
