= Akagawa =

Akagawa (written: 赤川 lit. "red river") is a Japanese surname. Notable people with the surname include:

- Jirō Akagawa (赤川 次郎, born 1948), Japanese writer
- Katsuki Akagawa (赤川 克紀, born 1990), Japanese baseball player
- Kinji Akagawa (born 1940), American sculptor
- Akagawa Motoyasu (赤川 元保, died 1567), Japanese samurai

== See also ==
- Akagawa Station, (赤川駅 Akagawa-eki), a railway station in Mutsu, Aomori Prefecture, Japan
- Aka River, (赤川 Akagawa), a river in Yamagata Prefecture, Japan
