= 2011 Pacific League Climax Series =

Japanese baseball series

First stage
| Team (Wins) | | Manager | Season |
| Saitama Seibu Lions (2) | | Hisanobu Watanabe | 68–67–9 (.504), 20½ GB |
| Hokkaido Nippon-Ham Fighters (0) | | Masataka Nashida | 72–65–7 (.526), 17½ GB |
- Dates: October 29–30

Final stage
| Team (Wins) | | Manager | Season |
| Fukuoka SoftBank Hawks (4) | | Koji Akiyama | 88–46–10 (.657), 17½ GA |
| Saitama Seibu Lions (0) | | Hisanobu Watanabe | 68–67–9 (.504), 20½ GB |
- Dates: November 3–5
- MVP: Seiichi Uchikawa (SoftBank)

The 2011 Pacific League Climax Series (PLCS) consisted of two consecutive series, Stage 1 being a best-of-three series and Stage 2 being a best-of-six with the top seed being awarded a one-win advantage. The winner of the series advanced to the 2011 Japan Series, where they competed against the 2011 Central League Climax Series winner. The top three regular-season finishers played in the two series. The PLCS began with the first game of Stage 1 on October 29 and ended with the final game of Stage 2 on November 5.

== First stage ==
=== Summary ===
Saitama Seibu Lions won the series, 2–0.

| Game | Date | Score | Location | Time | Attendance |
|---|---|---|---|---|---|
| 1 | October 29 | Saitama Seibu Lions – 5, Hokkaido Nippon-Ham Fighters – 2 (11) | Sapporo Dome | 3:55 | 42,063 |
| 2 | October 30 | Saitama Seibu Lions – 8, Hokkaido Nippon-Ham Fighters – 1 | Sapporo Dome | 3:15 | 41,926 |

=== Game 1 ===
Saturday, October 29, 2011 at Sapporo Dome in Sapporo, Hokkaido
| Team | 1 | 2 | 3 | 4 | 5 | 6 | 7 | 8 | 9 | 10 | 11 | R | H | E |
|---|---|---|---|---|---|---|---|---|---|---|---|---|---|---|
| Seibu | 0 | 0 | 0 | 0 | 0 | 0 | 1 | 0 | 1 | 0 | 3 | 5 | 9 | 1 |
| Nippon-Ham | 2 | 0 | 0 | 0 | 0 | 0 | 0 | 4 | 0 | 0 | 0 | 2 | 6 | 1 |
WP: Kazuhisa Makita (1–0) LP: Ryo Sakakibara (0–1)

=== Game 2 ===
Sunday, October 30, 2011 at Sapporo Dome in Sapporo, Hokkaido
| Team | 1 | 2 | 3 | 4 | 5 | 6 | 7 | 8 | 9 | R | H | E |
|---|---|---|---|---|---|---|---|---|---|---|---|---|
| Seibu | 0 | 0 | 0 | 0 | 1 | 0 | 0 | 1 | 6 | 8 | 13 | 1 |
| Nippon-Ham | 0 | 0 | 0 | 1 | 0 | 0 | 0 | 0 | 0 | 1 | 7 | 1 |
WP: Fumiya Nishiguchi (1–0) LP: Yuya Ishii (0–1); Home runs: SEI: Takeya Nakamura (1); NIP: Micah Hoffpauir (1)

== Final stage ==
=== Summary ===
Fukuoka SoftBank Hawks won the series, 4–0*.

| Game | Date | Score | Location | Time | Attendance |
|---|---|---|---|---|---|
| 1 | November 3 | Saitama Seibu Lions – 2, Fukuoka SoftBank Hawks – 4 | Yahoo Dome | 2:57 | 37,025 |
| 2 | November 4 | Saitama Seibu Lions – 2, Fukuoka SoftBank Hawks – 7 | Yahoo Dome | 3:10 | 35,021 |
| 3 | November 5 | Saitama Seibu Lions – 1, Fukuoka SoftBank Hawks – 2 (12) | Yahoo Dome | 4:00 | 37,025 |

* The Pacific League regular season champion is given a one-game advantage in the Final Stage.

=== Game 1 ===
Thursday, November 3, 2011 at Fukuoka Yahoo! Japan Dome in Fukuoka, Fukuoka Prefecture
| Team | 1 | 2 | 3 | 4 | 5 | 6 | 7 | 8 | 9 | R | H | E |
|---|---|---|---|---|---|---|---|---|---|---|---|---|
| Seibu | 0 | 0 | 0 | 0 | 0 | 0 | 1 | 1 | 0 | 2 | 6 | 0 |
| SoftBank | 0 | 0 | 2 | 0 | 0 | 2 | 0 | 0 | X | 4 | 7 | 0 |
WP: Tsuyoshi Wada (1–0) LP: Kazuyuki Hoashi (0–1) Sv: Takahiro Mahara (1); Home runs: SEI: Takeya Nakamura (1); SOF: None

=== Game 2 ===
Friday, November 4, 2011 at Fukuoka Yahoo! Japan Dome in Fukuoka, Fukuoka Prefecture
| Team | 1 | 2 | 3 | 4 | 5 | 6 | 7 | 8 | 9 | R | H | E |
|---|---|---|---|---|---|---|---|---|---|---|---|---|
| Seibu | 0 | 2 | 0 | 0 | 0 | 0 | 0 | 0 | 0 | 2 | 6 | 0 |
| SoftBank | 1 | 0 | 0 | 0 | 0 | 2 | 0 | 4 | X | 7 | 9 | 0 |
WP: Tadashi Settsu (1–0) LP: Takayuki Kishi (0–1); Home runs: SEI: None; SOF: Nobuhiro Matsuda (1), Nobuhiko Matsunaka (1)

=== Game 3 ===
Saturday, November, 2011 at Fukuoka Yahoo! Japan Dome in Fukuoka, Fukuoka Prefecture
| Team | 1 | 2 | 3 | 4 | 5 | 6 | 7 | 8 | 9 | 10 | 11 | 12 | R | H | E |
|---|---|---|---|---|---|---|---|---|---|---|---|---|---|---|---|
| Seibu | 0 | 0 | 0 | 0 | 0 | 0 | 0 | 0 | 0 | 1 | 0 | 0 | 1 | 7 | 0 |
| SoftBank | 0 | 0 | 0 | 0 | 0 | 0 | 0 | 0 | 0 | 1 | 0 | 1X | 2 | 10 | 0 |
WP: Takahiro Mahara (1–0) LP: Kazuhisa Makita (0–1)

Having won the previous two games and along with the one-game advantage, the Hawks needed a win or a tie to advance to the Japan Series. After the Lions' did not score in the top half of the 12th inning, the Hawks secured a tie game, which ensured that they would advance, however the bottom half of the inning was played anyway. When this situation occurred again in the First Stage of the 2014 Central League Climax Series, the decision was made to not play the bottom half of the last inning.
