= Motoyasu =

- Gender: Male

Origin
- Origin: Japanese
- Meaning: Different meanings depending on the kanji used

Motoyasu (written: 元康 or 元保) is a masculine Japanese given name. Notable people with the name include:

- Akagawa Motoyasu (赤川 元保) (died 1567), Japanese samurai
- Ushiomaru Motoyasu (潮丸 元康) (1978–2019), Japanese sumo wrestler
