= Akazawa =

Akazawa (written: 赤沢) is a Japanese surname. Notable people with the surname include:

- Chikashi Akazawa (赤沢 親, born 1934), Japanese ice hockey player
- Ryosei Akazawa (赤沢 亮正, born 1960), Japanese politician

== See also ==
- Akagawa
