= Masubuchi =

Masubuchi (written: 増渕 or 増淵) is a Japanese surname. Notable people with the surname include:

- Mariko Masubuchi (増淵 まり子, born 1980), Japanese softball player
- Tatsuyoshi Masubuchi (増渕 竜義, born 1988), Japanese baseball player
