= 2012 Japan Series =

Team (Wins)	Managers	Season
Yomiuri Giants (4)	Tatsunori Hara	86–43–15, (.667), GA: 10.5
Hokkaido Nippon-Ham Fighters (2)	Hideki Kuriyama	74–59–11, (.556), GA: 3.0
- Dates: October 27 – November 3
- MVP: Tetsuya Utsumi (Yomiuri)
- FSA: Atsunori Inaba (Hokkaido)

Broadcast
- Television: In Japan: NTV (Games 1, 2 and 6); TV Asahi (Games 3, 5); Fuji TV (Game 4)
- Radio: JRN, NRN

The 2012 Japan Series was the 63rd edition of Nippon Professional Baseball's (NPB) championship series known colloquially as the Japan Series. The best-of-seven playoff was won by the Central League champion Yomiuri Giants in six games over the Pacific League champion Hokkaido Nippon-Ham Fighters. It was the Giants' 22nd Japan Series title, second in the last four years. The series began on Saturday, October 27, 2012, and ended on Saturday, November 3, 2012, at the Tokyo Dome in Bunkyō, Tokyo. Giants starting pitcher Tetsuya Utsumi, who was the winning pitcher in Games 1 and 5, was named the Japan Series Most Valuable Player (MVP). Giants players Shinnosuke Abe, Hisayoshi Chono and John Bowker were also recognized with Outstanding Player awards.

== Climax Series ==
First Stage
Central League
2	Chunichi Dragons	2
3	Tokyo Yakult Swallows	1
Pacific League
2	Saitama Seibu Lions	1
3	Fukuoka SoftBank Hawks	2

Final Stage
1	Yomiuri Giants	4
2	Chunichi Dragons	3
1	Hokkaido Nippon-Ham Fighters	4
3	Fukuoka SoftBank Hawks	0

Japan Series
CL1	Yomiuri Giants	4
PL1	Hokkaido Nippon-Ham Fighters	2

== Summary ==
Yomiuri Giants won the series, 4–2.

Game	Date	Score	Location	Time	Attendance
1	October 27	Hokkaido Nippon-Ham Fighters – 1, Yomiuri Giants – 8	Tokyo Dome	3:13	44,981
2	October 28	Hokkaido Nippon-Ham Fighters – 0, Yomiuri Giants – 1	Tokyo Dome	2:51	44,932
3	October 30	Yomiuri Giants – 3, Hokkaido Nippon-Ham Fighters – 7	Sapporo Dome	4:04	36,942
4	October 31	Yomiuri Giants – 0, Hokkaido Nippon-Ham Fighters – 1 (12)	Sapporo Dome	4:15	40,433
5	November 1	Yomiuri Giants – 10, Hokkaido Nippon-Ham Fighters – 2	Sapporo Dome	3:52	40,579
6	November 3	Hokkaido Nippon-Ham Fighters – 3, Yomiuri Giants – 4	Tokyo Dome	3:22	45,018

== Game summaries ==
=== Game 1 ===
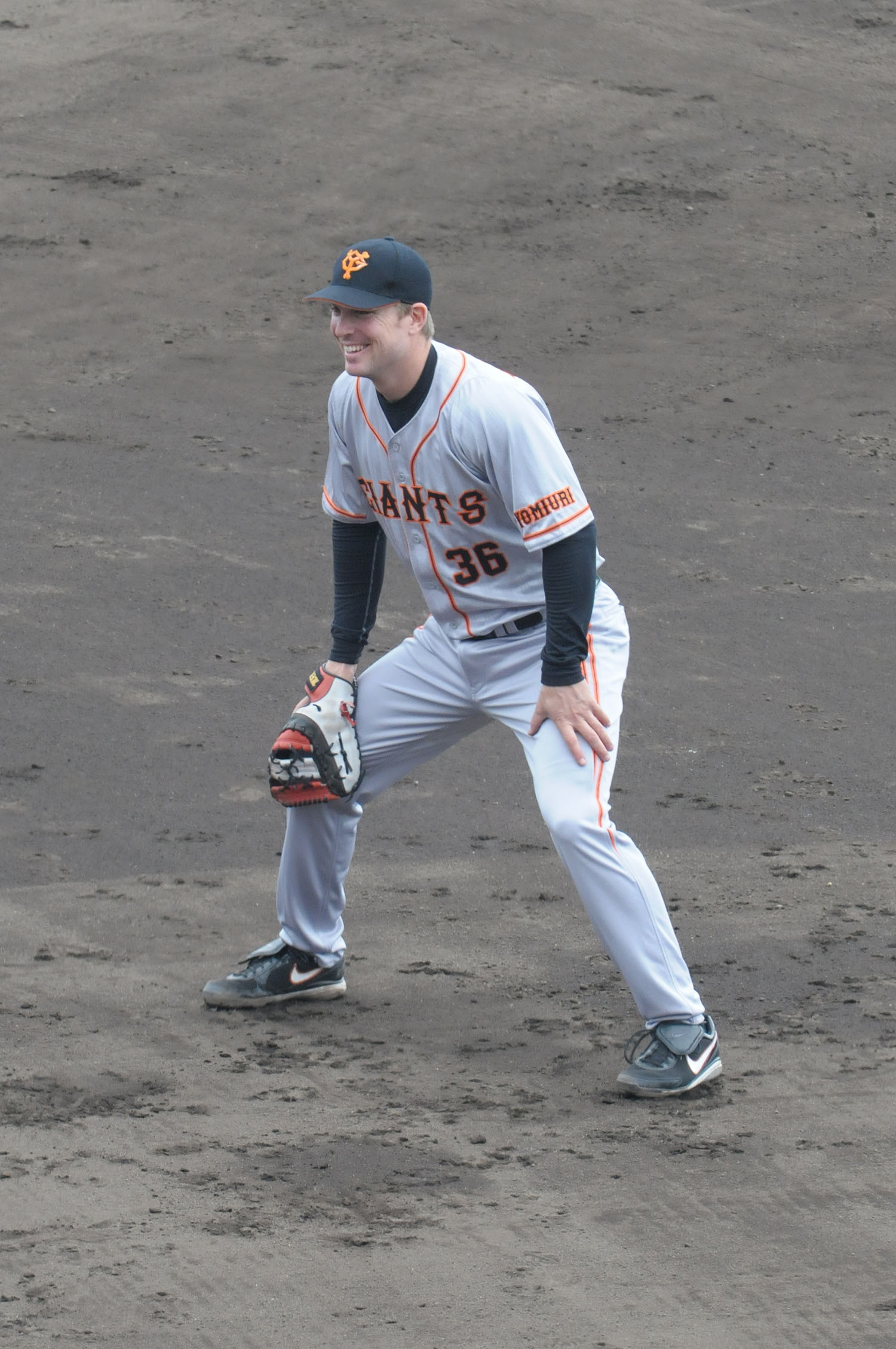
John Bowker collected five RBIs in Game 1, one shy of tying the Japan Series record.

Saturday, October 27, 2012, 6:11 pm (JST) at Tokyo Dome in Bunkyō, Tokyo
Team	1	2	3	4	5	6	7	8	9	R	H	E
Nippon-Ham	0	0	0	0	0	0	0	0	1	1	3	0
Yomiuri	0	0	0	4	2	0	2	0	X	8	14	0
WP: Tetsuya Utsumi (1–0) LP: Mitsuo Yoshikawa (0–1); Home runs: NHF: Dai-Kang Yang (1); YOM: John Bowker (1)

After three scoreless innings, the Giants scored the first run of the series in the bottom of the fourth with an RBI single off the bat of catcher Shinnosuke Abe. Later in the same inning, former Major League Baseball (MLB) player John Bowker hit a two-out, three-run home run to put the Giants up 4–0. Fighters' starter Mitsuo Yoshikawa was taken out of the game following the inning. He gave up four runs on seven hits. The next inning, the Giants added two runs to their total with RBIs from Abe and outfielder Yoshinobu Takahashi. After a scoreless sixth inning, Bowker struck again in the seventh. He hit a double to right field with the bases loaded, driving in two more runs. Bowker finished the game with five RBIs, one shy of tying the Japan Series record. All eight of the Giants' starting position players finished the game with at least one hit.

The 2012 season was Bowker's first season playing in NPB. He performed poorly during the 69 regular season games in which he appeared, hitting three home runs, ten RBIs and a .196 batting average. In August and September, Bowker was sent away to play on the Giants farm team; however, he was brought back near the end of the regular season. He made his NPB postseason debut in Game 3 of the final stage of the Central League Climax Series. After going 2-for-4 in that game, he played in the three remaining games of the series recording a hit in each.

Giants' starter Tetsuya Utsumi kept the Fighters scoreless through the seven innings he pitched. He struck out eight and allowed only two hits with no walks; however, he did hit two batters. The Fighters managed to avoid a shutout when outfielder Daikan Yoh hit a solo home run off of Giants pitcher Dicky Gonzalez.

=== Game 2 ===
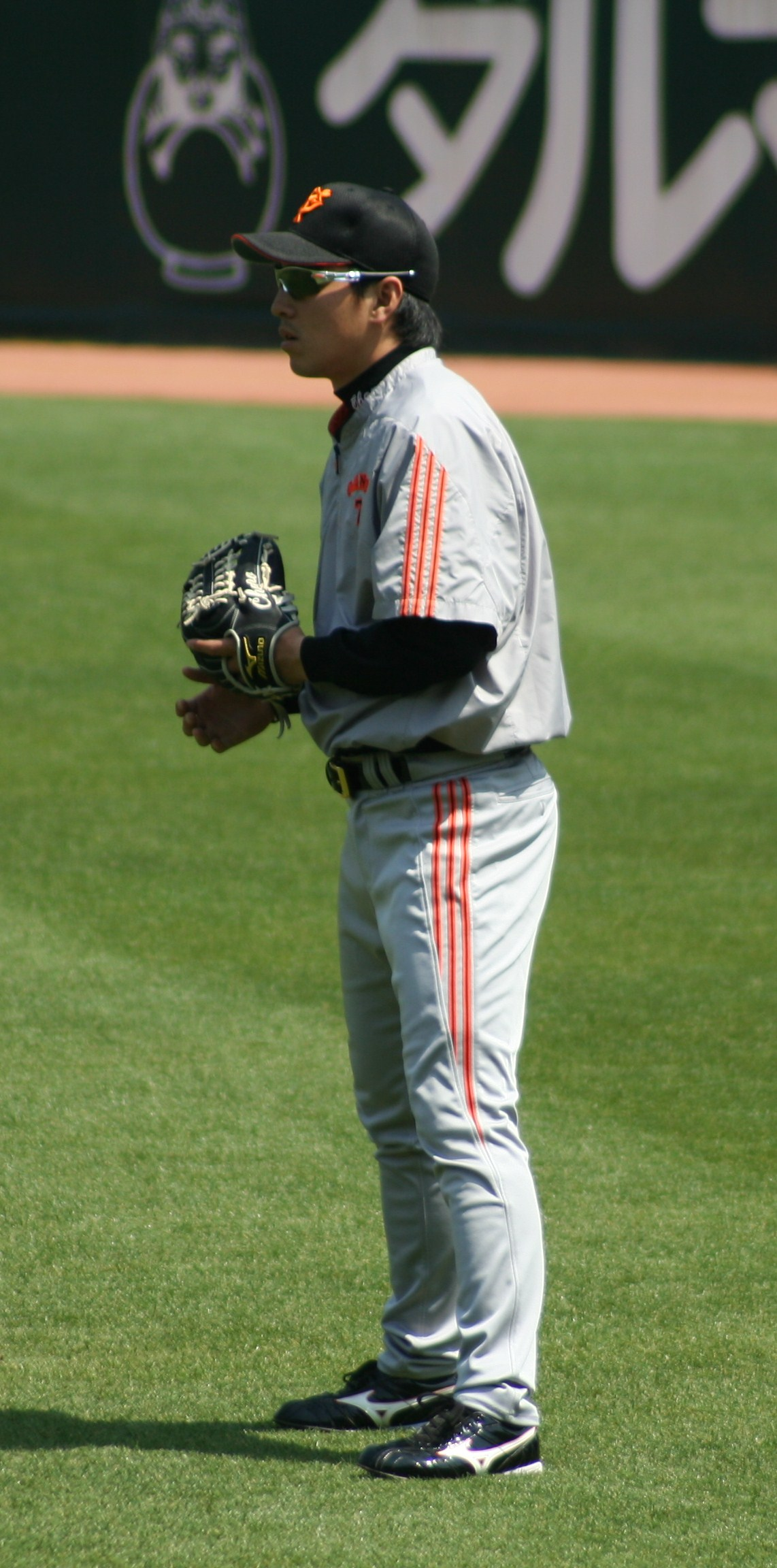
Hisayoshi Chono's (seen here in 2010) solo, lead-off home run in the first inning was the game-winning RBI.

Sunday, October 28, 2012, 6:10 pm (JST) at Tokyo Dome in Bunkyō, Tokyo
Team	1	2	3	4	5	6	7	8	9	R	H	E
Nippon-Ham	0	0	0	0	0	0	0	0	0	0	5	0
Yomiuri	1	0	0	0	0	0	0	0	X	1	5	0
WP: Hirokazu Sawamura (1–0) LP: Masaru Takeda (0–1) Sv: Scott Mathieson (1); Home runs: NHF: None; YOM: Hisayoshi Chono (1)

Second-year pitcher Hirokazu Sawamura started Game 2 for the Giants, marking his first Japan Series appearance. In the first pitch of the night, Sawamura hit Daikan Yoh. After recording two outs, Sawamura hit a second batter, outfielder Sho Nakata. He retired the next batter and finished the inning without allowing any runs. After being hit, Yoh continued to play; however, Nakata was removed from the game after the fourth inning to be taken to a hospital for X-rays on his hand. No bones were broken and Nakata returned for Game 3. Fighters starter Masaru Takeda took the mound in the bottom half of the inning and gave up a lead-off, solo home run to outfielder Hisayoshi Chono. It was the 12th lead-off home run in Japan Series history.

Chono's lead-off home run proved to be the difference in the game. After the first inning, Takeda allowed only three more hits over five scoreless innings. He struck out a total of ten batters. Sawamura went on to pitch through eight scoreless innings, allowing only three hits and striking out seven. With two outs in the ninth inning, the Fighters had a chance to score after Giants reliever Tetsuya Yamaguchi allowed two singles. Yamaguchi was replaced by Scott Mathieson who threw one pitch to Tomohiro Nioka to record an out and secure the Giants' win. Mathieson's save was the first one-pitch save and the sixth one-batter save in Japan Series history. Also, for only the second time in Japan Series history, no walks were allowed by any pitcher used by either team in the game.

=== Game 3 ===
Tuesday, October 30, 2012, 6:32 pm (JST) at Sapporo Dome in Sapporo, Hokkaido
Team	1	2	3	4	5	6	7	8	9	R	H	E
Yomiuri	0	0	0	0	2	0	0	1	0	3	11	1
Nippon-Ham	0	2	3	0	0	1	0	1	X	7	12	0
WP: Brian Wolfe (1-0) LP: D. J. Houlton (0-1); Home runs: YOM: None; NHF: Atsunori Inaba (1)

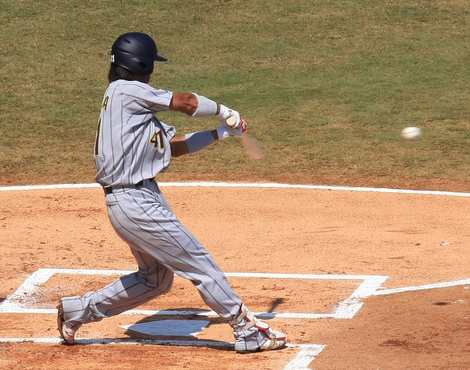
The Fighters' Atsunori Inaba gave his team their first lead of the series with a solo home run in Game 3.

In Game 3, the Fighters found themselves starting their potential three-game homestand down two-games-to-none. Fighters designated hitter Atsunori Inaba got the scoring started in the second inning with a solo home run, giving the Fighters their first lead of the series. Shortstop Makoto Kaneko added to the lead with an RBI single later in the inning. The scoring continued for the Fighters in the third. Giants starter D. J. Houlton was quickly replaced after walking two batters and then allowing Inaba and third baseman Eiichi Koyano to collect back-to-back RBI hits. The next batter, first baseman Micah Hoffpauir, batted in another run before the end of the third inning.

Fighters starter Brian Wolfe pitched through five innings allowing five hits, striking out three, walking three and hitting a batter. He allowed two runs, both in the fifth inning. For the bottom of the fifth, Shinnosuke Abe was replaced at catcher. Abe felt discomfort in his leg when he attempted to get on base during the top of the inning. Because of this injury, the Giants captain was missing from the line up for Game 4 and Game 5.

With the Fighters up 6–2, the Giants threatened to score in the top of the eighth inning. They loaded the bases with three consecutive no-out singles off of Fighters reliever Hirotoshi Masui. Masui forced the next two batters to pop out and ground out before allowing an RBI single. He escaped the inning with only one run scored when he got the next batter to fly out. The Fighters' entire starting lineup finished the game with at least one hit. Their total of 12 hits surpassed their total of eight hits from Games 1 and 2 combined.

=== Game 4 ===
Wednesday, October 31, 2012, 6:30 pm (JST) at Sapporo Dome in Sapporo, Hokkaido
Team	1	2	3	4	5	6	7	8	9	10	11	12	R	H	E
Yomiuri	0	0	0	0	0	0	0	0	0	0	0	0	0	7	1
Nippon-Ham	0	0	0	0	0	0	0	0	0	0	0	1	1	8	0
WP: Naoki Miyanishi (1–0) LP: Kentaro Nishimura (0–1)

Game 4 started as a pitcher's duel between Fighters pitcher Masaru Nakamura and Giants pitcher Ryosuke Miyaguni. Both young starters took a scoreless game through seven innings before being relieved. Nakamura allowed five hits, struck out three and walked none, while Miyaguni allowed three hits, striking out four and walking two. The game went into extra innings and remained scoreless until the bottom of the 12th. Eiichi Koyano led off the bottom of the 12th with a single. He was thrown out at second by Giants reliever Kentaro Nishimura on Takuya Nakashima's sacrifice bunt attempt. Next, Shota Ono bunted and again Nishimura fielded the ball; however, second baseman Daisuke Fujimura, then covering first base, could not handle Nishimura's throw. Fujimura's error left runners safe on first and second. With only one out, Yuji Iiyama was given the go-ahead to hit instead of laying down another sacrifice bunt. Iiyama hit a walk-off double to drive the game-winning run home.

=== Game 5 ===
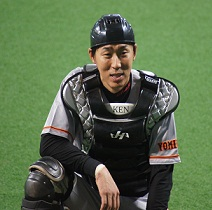
Yomiuri Giants backup catcher Ken Kato's simulation of being hit by pitch was at the center of a controversial Game 5 call.

Thursday, November 1, 2012, 2012, 6:32 pm (JST) at Sapporo Dome in Sapporo, Hokkaido
Team	1	2	3	4	5	6	7	8	9	R	H	E
Yomiuri	0	2	3	1	2	0	0	0	2	10	15	0
Nippon-Ham	0	1	1	0	0	0	0	0	0	2	9	1
WP: Tetsuya Utsumi (2–0) LP: Mitsuo Yoshikawa (0–2); Home runs: YOM: John Bowker (2); NHF: None

John Bowker had another memorable night in Game 5. His two-run home run in the second inning put the Giants up 2–0. The Fighters cut the deficit in half in bottom of the inning. Fighters starter Mitsuo Yoshikawa continued to struggle to get batters out in the third. After giving up three more RBIs, Yoshikawa was relieved by Kazuhito Tadano after just 2 2/3 innings.

Giants backup catcher Ken Kato was at the center of a controversial call the next inning. With a runner on first base, Kato was preparing to lay down a sacrifice bunt. After Tadano's first pitch, Kato dropped to the ground holding his head, apparently indicating that he had been hit. Home plate umpire Koichi Yanada awarded Kato first base and ejected Tadano for a dangerous pitch. He was the first player in Japan Series history to be removed from a game for a dangerous pitch. Replays clearly showed, however, that the pitch did not hit Kato, who sold the umpire on a hit by pitch in a move similar to simulation in football, flopping in basketball, or embellishment in ice hockey, all of which are punishable in their respective sports. The game taking place in Hokkaido, Fighters fans booed intensely during Kato's remaining two at-bats later in the game. Fighters manager Hideki Kuriyama ran onto the field and argued with Yanada that Kato had not been hit, but the call stood. In the top half of the fifth inning, a pitch hit Hisayoshi Chono on the knee and he had to leave the game.

Tetsuya Utsumi earned his second win of the series with a strong, eight-inning outing. He allowed two runs on seven hits and struck out seven without walking a batter. The Giants continued to score throughout the game, eventually routing the Fighters 10–2.

=== Game 6 ===
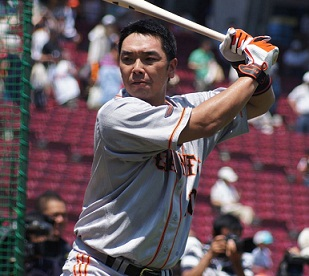
Shinnosuke Abe had the series-winning hit in Game 6.

Saturday, November 3, 2012, 6:11 pm (JST) at Tokyo Dome in Bunkyō, Tokyo
Team	1	2	3	4	5	6	7	8	9	R	H	E
Nippon-Ham	0	0	0	0	0	3	0	0	0	3	8	0
Yomiuri	2	1	0	0	0	0	1	0	X	4	7	0
WP: Kyosuke Takagi (1–0) LP: Yuya Ishii (0–1) Sv: Tetsuya Yamaguchi (1); Home runs: NHF: Sho Nakata (1); YOM: Hisayoshi Chono (2)

The Giants took a quick lead in Game 6 with outfielder Kenji Yano's bases-loaded single which produced two runs in the bottom of the first inning. Fighters starter Masaru Takeda was quickly pulled from the game after the second inning in which he allowed a third Giants run off of Hisayoshi Chono's solo home run, his second of the series. Heading into the top of the sixth inning, the Fighters were down 3–0 when Sho Nakata hit a three-run home run to tie the game.

The tie was broken, however, in the bottom of the seventh. Chono led off the inning with a walk and was quickly advanced to second on a sacrifice bunt from Tetsuya Matsumoto. Two batters later, Shinnosuke Abe hit a single up the middle of the field to earn what proved to be the game-winning RBI. Abe returned to the Giants roster for Game 6 after missing the previous two games because of discomfort in his right leg. Scott Mathieson then threw a scoreless eighth and Tetsuya Yamaguchi earned the save by keeping the Fighters from capitalizing on a hit and a walk in the ninth.

== See also ==
- 2012 Korean Series
- 2012 World Series
