= 2011 Nippon Professional Baseball season =

2011 NPB season
- League: Nippon Professional Baseball
- Sport: Baseball
- Duration: April 12 – November 20

Central League pennant
- League champions: Chunichi Dragons
- Runners-up: Tokyo Yakult Swallows
- Season MVP: Takuya Asao (Chunichi)

Pacific League pennant
- League champions: Fukuoka SoftBank Hawks
- Runners-up: Hokkaido Nippon-Ham Fighters
- Season MVP: Seiichi Uchikawa (SoftBank)

Climax Series
- CL champions: Chunichi Dragons
- CL runners-up: Tokyo Yakult Swallows
- PL champions: Fukuoka SoftBank Hawks
- PL runners-up: Saitama Seibu Lions

Japan Series
- Venue: Fukuoka Yahoo! JAPAN Dome, Chūō-ku, Fukuoka; Vantelin Dome Nagoya, Nagoya, Aichi
- Champions: Fukuoka SoftBank Hawks
- Runners-up: Chunichi Dragons
- Finals MVP: Hiroki Kokubo (SoftBank)

NPB seasons
- ← 2010 2012 →

The 2011 Nippon Professional Baseball season was the 62nd season since the NPB was reorganized in 1950. The season was delayed by the Tohoku earthquake. The Tohoku Rakuten Golden Eagles, based in northern Japan, and coached by Senichi Hoshino, were particularly affected by the quake, as the Miyagi Baseball Stadium was badly damaged.

Because of energy concerns following the earthquake, NPB also imposed restrictions on games during the regular season. A three-hour-thirty-minute rule was imposed. If a game went past the 3:30 mark, regardless of inning, the inning in question would be the last inning. A game would be called should any blackout occur during the game. The 3:30 clock starts at the first pitch of the game and continues in case of any delay.

At the season's end, the Yokohama BayStars was renamed as Yokohama DeNA BayStars as the owner changes.

== Regular season standings ==
Central League regular season standings
Team	G	W	L	T	Pct.	GB
Chunichi Dragons	144	75	59	10	.560	—
Tokyo Yakult Swallows	144	70	59	15	.543	2.5
Yomiuri Giants	144	71	62	11	.534	3.5
Hanshin Tigers	144	68	70	6	.493	9.0
Hiroshima Toyo Carp	144	60	76	8	.441	16.0
Yokohama BayStars	144	47	86	11	.353	27.5

Pacific League regular season standings
Team	G	W	L	T	Pct.	GB
Fukuoka SoftBank Hawks	144	88	46	10	.657	—
Hokkaido Nippon-Ham Fighters	144	72	65	7	.526	17.5
Saitama Seibu Lions	144	68	67	9	.504	20.5
Orix Buffaloes	144	69	68	7	.504	20.5
Tohoku Rakuten Golden Eagles	144	66	71	7	.482	23.5
Chiba Lotte Marines	144	54	79	11	.406	33.5

== Climax Series ==
Note: All of the games that are played in the first two rounds of the Climax Series are held at the higher seed's home stadium. The team with the higher regular-season standing also advances if the round ends in a tie.

First stage
Central League
2	Tokyo Yakult Swallows	2
3	Yomiuri Giants	1
Pacific League
2	Hokkaido Nippon-Ham Fighters	0
3	Saitama Seibu Lions	2

Final stage
1	Chunichi Dragons	4
2	Tokyo Yakult Swallows	2
1	Fukuoka SoftBank Hawks	4
3	Saitama Seibu Lions	0

Japan Series
CL1	Chunichi Dragons	3
PL1	Fukuoka SoftBank Hawks	4

=== First stage ===
The regular season league champions, the Fukuoka SoftBank Hawks (PL) and the Chunichi Dragons (CL), received byes to the championship round.

==== Central League ====
Tokyo Yakult Swallows (2) vs. Yomiuri Giants (1)

Game	Date	Score	Location	Time	Attendance
1	October 29	Yomiuri Giants – 2, Tokyo Yakult Swallows – 3	Meiji Jingu Stadium	3:28	32,339
2	October 30	Yomiuri Giants – 6, Tokyo Yakult Swallows – 2	Meiji Jingu Stadium	3:24	32,148
3	October 31	Yomiuri Giants – 1, Tokyo Yakult Swallows – 3	Meiji Jingu Stadium	2:51	31,687

==== Pacific League ====
Saitama Seibu Lions (2) vs. Hokkaido Nippon-Ham Fighters (0)

Game	Date	Score	Location	Time	Attendance
1	October 29	Saitama Seibu Lions – 5, Hokkaido Nippon-Ham Fighters – 2	Sapporo Dome	3:55	42,063
2	October 30	Saitama Seibu Lions – 8, Hokkaido Nippon-Ham Fighters – 1	Sapporo Dome	3:15	41,926

=== Final stage ===
The regular season league champions, the Fukuoka SoftBank Hawks (PL) and the Chunichi Dragons (CL), received a one-game advantage.

==== Central League ====
Chunichi Dragons (4) vs. Tokyo Yakult Swallows (2)

Game	Date	Score	Location	Time	Attendance
1	November 2	Tokyo Yakult Swallows – 1, Chunichi Dragons – 2	Nagoya Dome	3:05	34,689
2	November 3	Tokyo Yakult Swallows – 3, Chunichi Dragons – 1	Nagoya Dome	2:53	38,414
3	November 4	Tokyo Yakult Swallows – 2, Chunichi Dragons – 1	Nagoya Dome	3:50	37,599
4	November 5	Tokyo Yakult Swallows – 1, Chunichi Dragons – 5	Nagoya Dome	3:08	38,342
5	November 6	Tokyo Yakult Swallows – 1, Chunichi Dragons – 2	Nagoya Dome	2:51	38,252

==== Pacific League ====
Fukuoka SoftBank Hawks (4) vs. Saitama Seibu Lions (0)

Game	Date	Score	Location	Time	Attendance
1	November 3	Saitama Seibu Lions – 2, Fukuoka SoftBank Hawks – 4	Yahoo Dome	2:57	37,025
2	November 4	Saitama Seibu Lions – 2, Fukuoka SoftBank Hawks – 7	Yahoo Dome	3:10	35,021
3	November 5	Saitama Seibu Lions – 1, Fukuoka SoftBank Hawks – 2	Yahoo Dome	4:00	37,025

== Japan Series ==
PL Fukuoka SoftBank Hawks (4) vs. CL Chunichi Dragons (3)

Game	Date	Score	Location	Time	Attendance
1	November 12	Chunichi Dragons – 2, Fukuoka SoftBank Hawks – 1	Fukuoka Dome	3:31	34,457
2	November 13	Chunichi Dragons – 2, Fukuoka SoftBank Hawks – 1	Fukuoka Dome	3:44	34,758
3	November 15	Fukuoka SoftBank Hawks – 4, Chunichi Dragons – 2	Nagoya Dome	3:22	38,041
4	November 16	Fukuoka SoftBank Hawks – 2, Chunichi Dragons – 1	Nagoya Dome	3:40	38,041
5	November 17	Fukuoka SoftBank Hawks – 5, Chunichi Dragons – 0	Nagoya Dome	3:49	38,051
6	November 19	Chunichi Dragons – 2, Fukuoka SoftBank Hawks – 1	Fukuoka Dome	3:07	34,927
7	November 20	Chunichi Dragons – 0, Fukuoka SoftBank Hawks – 3	Fukuoka Dome	3:30	34,737

== League leaders ==
=== Central League ===
Batting leaders
Stat	Player	Team	Total
Batting average	Hisayoshi Chono	Yomiuri Giants	.316
Home runs	Wladimir Balentien	Tokyo Yakult Swallows	31
Runs batted in	Takahiro Arai	Hanshin Tigers	93
Runs	Norichika Aoki	Tokyo Yakult Swallows	73
Hits	Matt Murton	Hanshin Tigers	180
Stolen bases	Daisuke Fujimura	Yomiuri Giants	28

Pitching leaders
Stat	Player	Team	Total
Wins	Tetsuya Utsumi; Kazuki Yoshimi	Yomiuri Giants; Chunichi Dragons	18
Losses	Kentaro Takasaki	Yokohama BayStars	15
Earned run average	Kazuki Yoshimi	Chunichi Dragons	1.65
Strikeouts	Kenta Maeda	Hiroshima Toyo Carp	192
Innings pitched	Kenta Maeda	Hiroshima Toyo Carp	216
Saves	Kyuji Fujikawa	Hanshin Tigers	41

=== Pacific League ===
Batting leaders
Stat	Player	Team	Total
Batting average	Seiichi Uchikawa	Fukuoka SoftBank Hawks	.338
Home runs	Takeya Nakamura	Saitama Seibu Lions	48
Runs batted in	Takeya Nakamura	Saitama Seibu Lions	116
Runs	Takeya Nakamura	Saitama Seibu Lions	97
Hits	Tomotaka Sakaguchi	Orix Buffaloes	175
Stolen bases	Yuichi Honda	Fukuoka SoftBank Hawks	60

Pitching leaders
Stat	Player	Team	Total
Wins	D. J. Houlton; Masahiro Tanaka	Fukuoka SoftBank Hawks; Tohoku Rakuten Golden Eagles	19
Losses	Yoshihisa Naruse; Masaru Takeda; Hideaki Wakui	Chiba Lotte Marines; Hokkaido Nippon-Ham Fighters; Saitama Seibu Lions	12
Earned run average	Masahiro Tanaka	Tohoku Rakuten Golden Eagles	1.27
Strikeouts	Yu Darvish	Hokkaido Nippon-Ham Fighters	276
Innings pitched	Yu Darvish	Hokkaido Nippon-Ham Fighters	232
Saves	Hisashi Takeda	Hokkaido Nippon-Ham Fighters	37

== See also ==
- 2011 Korea Professional Baseball season
- 2011 Major League Baseball season
