= Junki =

- Gender: Male

Origin
- Origin: Japanese
- Meaning: Different meanings depending on the kanji used

Junki (written: 淳樹, 淳希, 準規, 純輝, 隼樹, 潤基, 純喜, or 純貴) is a masculine Japanese given name. Notable people with the name include:

- Junki Endo (遠藤 純輝; born 1994), Japanese footballer
- Junki Goryo (五領 淳樹; born 1989), Japanese footballer
- Junki Hata (畑 潤基; born 1994), Japanese footballer
- Junki Ito (伊藤 準規; born 1991), Japanese baseball player
- Junki Kanayama (金山 隼樹; born 1988), Japanese footballer
- Junki Kishimoto (岸本 淳希; born 1996), Japanese baseball player
- Junki Koike (小池 純輝; born 1987), Japanese footballer
- Junki Kono (河野 純喜, born 1998), member of the Japanese boy band JO1
- Junki Tozuka (戸塚 純貴; born 1992), Japanese actor
- Junki Yokono (横野 純貴; born 1989), Japanese footballer
- Junki Takegami (武上 純希, born 1955), Japanese screenwriter
