= Tomotaka =

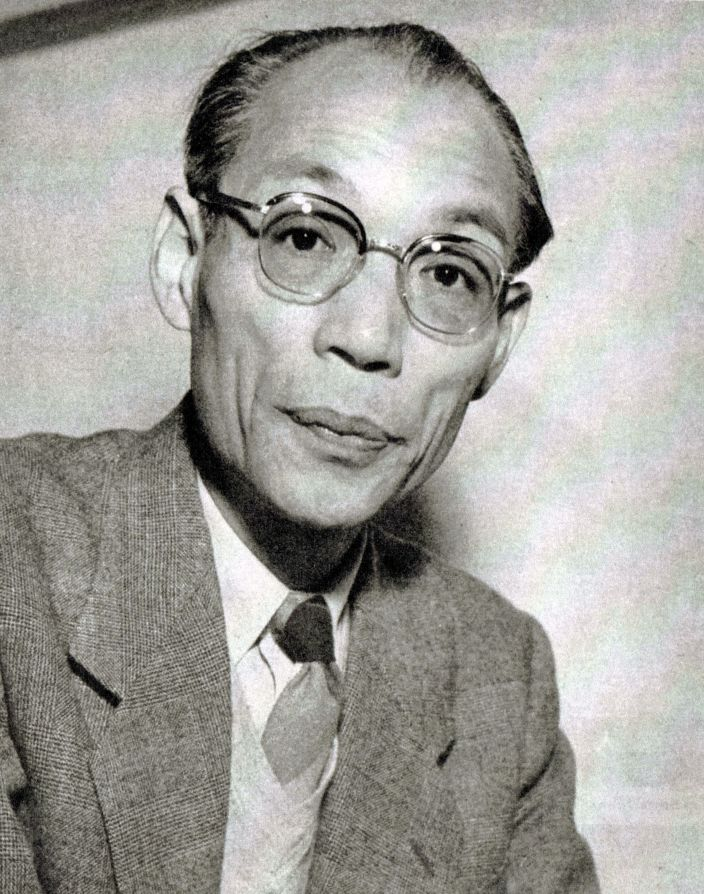
- Tomotaka Tasaka (1902–1974), Japanese film director
- Pronunciation: tomotaka (IPA)
- Gender: Male

Origin
- Origin: Japanese
- Meaning: Different meanings depending on the kanji used

Tomotaka is a masculine Japanese given name.

== Written forms ==
Tomotaka can be written using many different combinations of kanji characters. Some examples:

- 友隆, "friend, noble"
- 友孝, "friend, filial piety"
- 友貴, "friend, precious"
- 友崇, "friend, respect"
- 友喬, "friend, high"
- 友高, "friend, tall"
- 友昂, "friend, rise"
- 友豪, "friend, overpowering"
- 知隆, "know, noble"
- 知孝, "know, filial piety"
- 知貴, "know, precious"
- 知崇, "know, respect"
- 知喬, "know, high"
- 智隆, "intellect, noble"
- 智孝, "intellect, filial piety"
- 智貴, "intellect, precious"
- 共隆, "together, noble"
- 共孝, "together, filial piety"
- 朋隆, "companion, noble"
- 朋孝, "companion, filial piety"
- 朝隆, "morning/dynasty, noble"
- 朝孝, "morning/dynasty, filial piety"
- 朝貴, "morning/dynasty, precious"
- 朝崇, "morning/dynasty, respect"

The name can also be written in hiragana ともたか or katakana トモタカ.

== Notable people with the name ==
- Tomotaka Endo (遠藤 共峻; born 1995), Australian-born Japanese squash player
- Tomotaka Fukagawa (深川 友貴; born 1972), Japanese footballer
- Tomotaka Imamichi (今道 友隆; born 1959), Japanese musician
- Tomotaka Kitamura (北村 知隆; born 1982), Japanese footballer
- Tomotaka Sakaguchi (坂口 智隆; born 1984), Japanese baseball player
- Tomotaka Takahashi (高橋 智隆; born 1975), Japanese roboticist
- Tomotaka Tasaka (田坂 具隆; 1902–1974), Japanese film director
