= Tetsuya Kakiuchi =

Japanese baseball player and coach (born 1970)

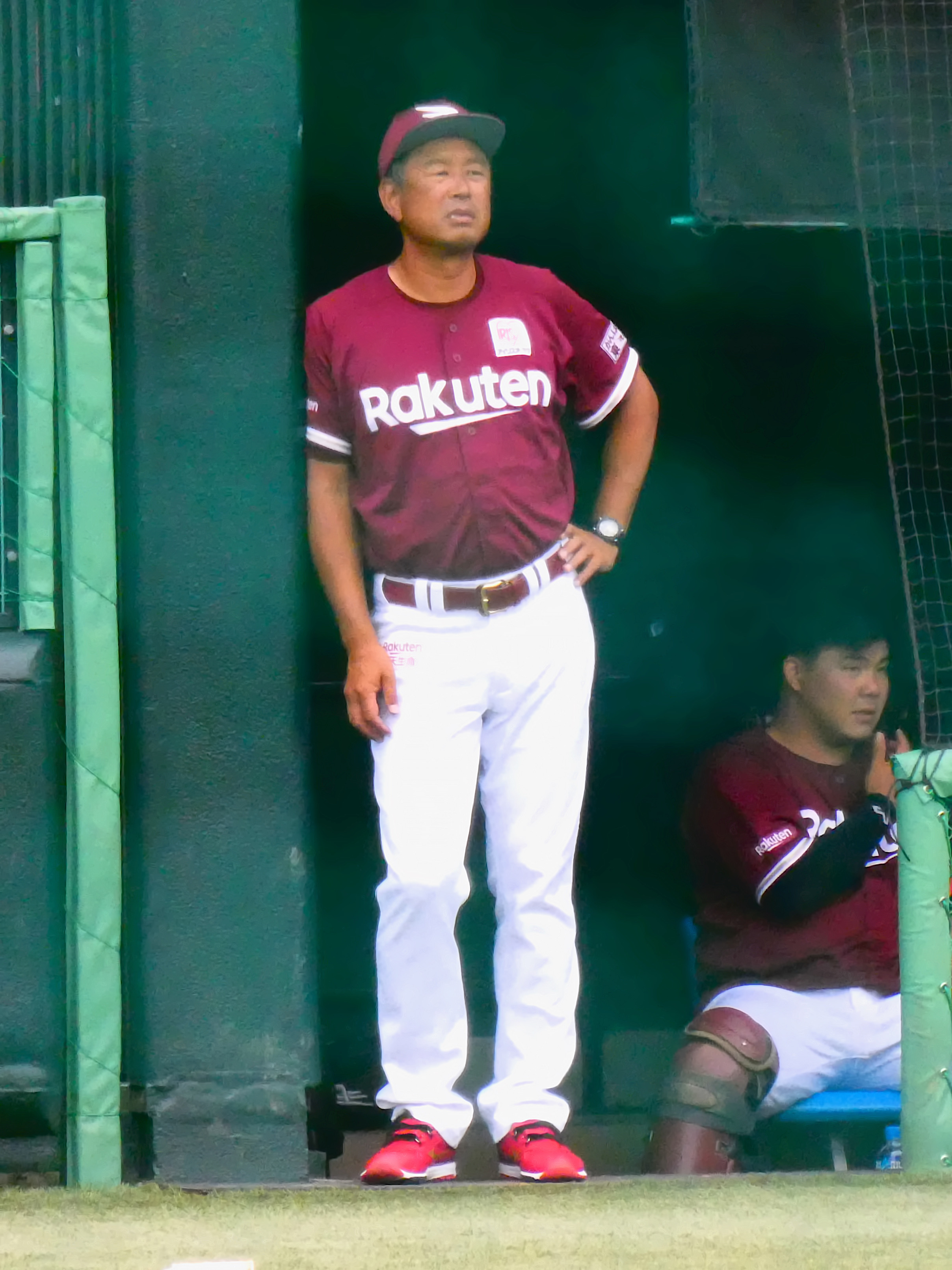
- Outfielder / Coach
- Born: June 6, 1970; Hidaka District, Wakayama, Japan
- Batted: Right Threw: Right

NPB debut
- June 18, 1991, for the Seibu Lions

Last appearance
- April 7, 2006, for the Chiba Lotte Marines

NPB statistics (through 2006)
- Batting average: .227
- Hits: 510
- Home runs: 110
- Runs batted in: 315
- Stolen base: 36
- Stats at Baseball Reference

Teams
- As player: Seibu Lions (1990–2002); Chiba Lotte Marines (2003–2006); As coach: Chunichi Dragons (2010–2011); Tohoku Rakuten Golden Eagles (2020–2022)

Career highlights and awards
- 1× NPB All-Star (1995)

Tetsuya Kakiuchi (垣内 哲也, Kakiuchi Tetsuya; born June 6, 1970 in Hidaka, Wakayama, Japan) is a Japanese former Nippon Professional Baseball outfielder.
