= Hirokazu Sawamura =

Japanese baseball player (born 1988)

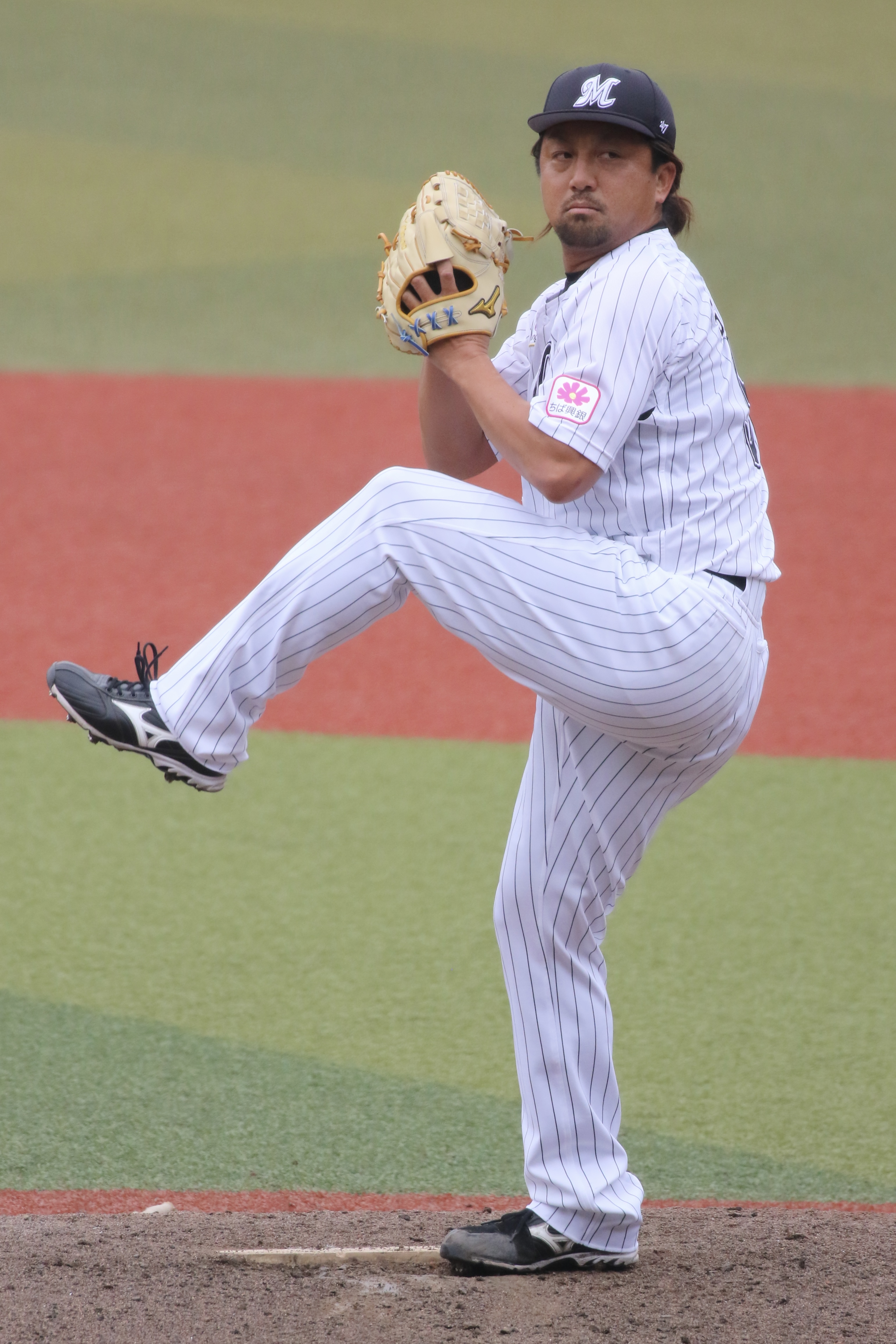
- Sawamura with the Chiba Lotte Marines in 2023
- Pitcher
- Born: April 3, 1988 (age 38); Tochigi, Japan
- Batted: Right Threw: Right

Professional debut
- NPB: April 15, 2011, for the Yomiuri Giants
- MLB: April 2, 2021, for the Boston Red Sox

Last appearance
- NPB: September 30, 2025, for the Chiba Lotte Marines
- MLB: August 28, 2022, for the Boston Red Sox

NPB statistics
- Win–loss record: 53–58
- Earned run average: 2.88
- Strikeouts: 850
- Saves: 79

MLB statistics
- Win–loss record: 6–2
- Earned run average: 3.39
- Strikeouts: 101
- Stats at Baseball Reference

Teams
- Yomiuri Giants (2011–2016, 2018–2020); Chiba Lotte Marines (2020); Boston Red Sox (2021–2022); Chiba Lotte Marines (2023–2025)

Career highlights and awards
- Japan Series champion (2012); Central League Rookie of the Year (2011)
Medals
Men's baseball
Representing Japan
2015 WBSC Premier12
| Bronze medal – third place | 2015 Tokyo | Team |
- Last updated on: September 11, 2020

Hirokazu Sawamura (澤村 拓一, Sawamura Hirokazu; born April 3, 1988) is a Japanese former professional baseball pitcher. He played in Nippon Professional Baseball (NPB) for the Yomiuri Giants and Chiba Lotte Marines, and in Major League Baseball (MLB) for the Boston Red Sox. Listed at 6 feet 0 inches (1.83 m) and 212 pounds (96 kg), he throws and bats right-handed.

== Baseball career ==
Sawamura played college baseball for Chuo University in Tokyo. On October 28, 2010, Sawamura was drafted by the Yomiuri Giants first overall pick in the 2010 Nippon Professional Baseball draft.

=== Yomiuri Giants ===
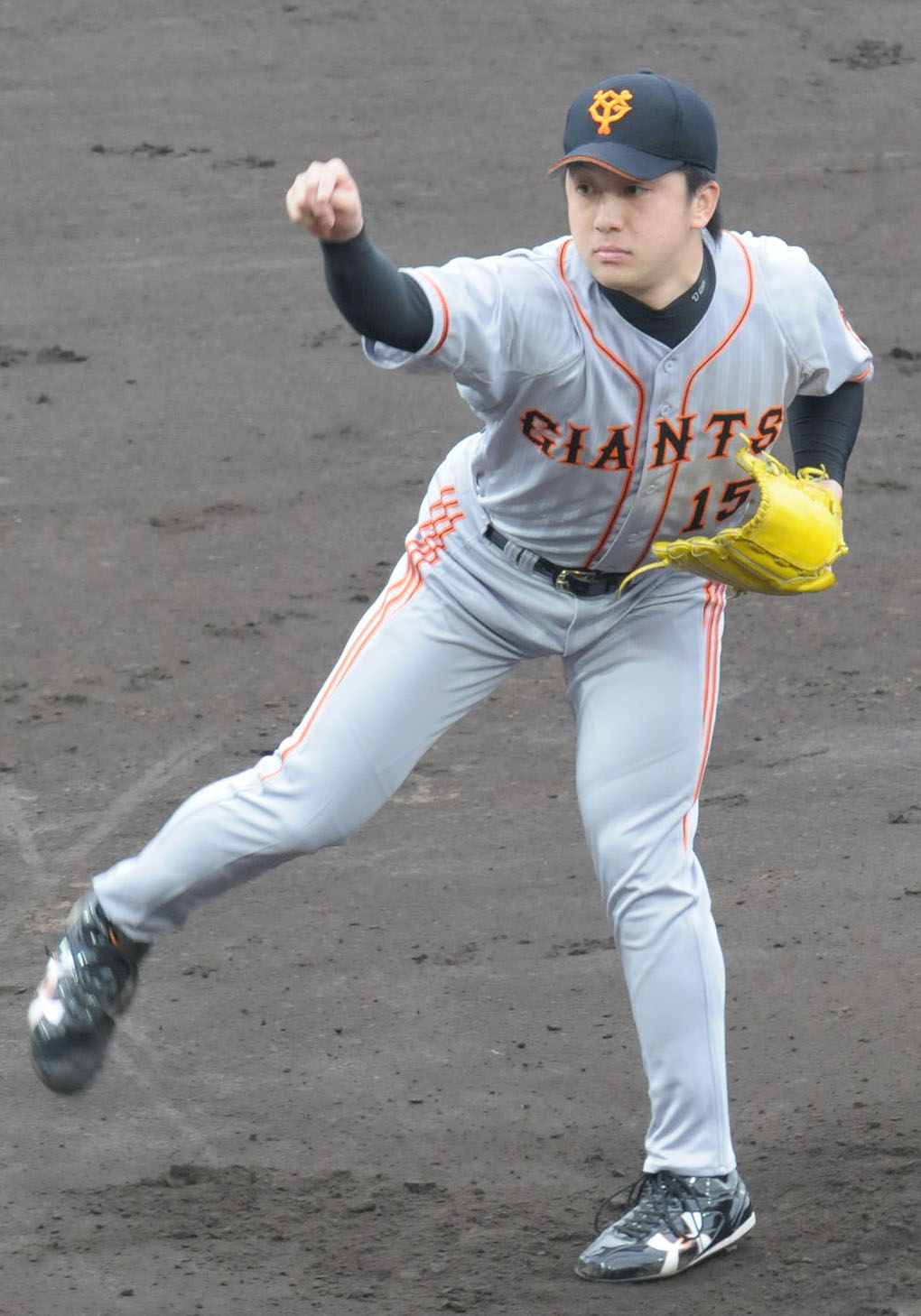
Sawamura with the Yomiuri Giants in 2012

Sawamura played nine seasons for the Yomiuri Giants during 2011–2020; he missed the 2017 season due to a shoulder injury. In 2011, he was named the Central League Rookie of the Year. In 2013, he was named MVP of the first game of the NPB All-Star Series. During his first four seasons with the Giants, he was predominantly a starting pitcher; after 2014, he only appeared for the Giants as a relief pitcher. As a closer during 2015 and 2016, he recorded 36 and 37 saves, respectively. During his nine seasons with the Giants, he compiled a 48–50 win–loss record with 74 saves.

Sawamura played for the Giants in three Japan Series, the annual championship series of NPB. He was the starting and winning pitcher of Game 2 in 2012, which the Giants went on to win in six games over the Hokkaido Nippon-Ham Fighters. He pitched as a reliever in 2013, when the Giants lost in seven games to the Tohoku Rakuten Golden Eagles, and in 2019, when the Giants lost in four games to the Fukuoka SoftBank Hawks.

=== Chiba Lotte Marines ===
On September 8, 2020, Sawamura was traded to the Chiba Lotte Marines. With the Marines in 2020, he appeared in 22 games, pitching to an 0–2 record with one save and a 1.71 earned run average (ERA) while striking out 29 batters in 21 innings pitched. After the season, Sawamura became a free agent.

=== Boston Red Sox ===
On February 16, 2021, Sawamura officially signed a two-year, $3 million contract with the Boston Red Sox of Major League Baseball (MLB). He made his MLB debut on April 2, pitching in relief against the Baltimore Orioles. He earned his first MLB win on April 23, after pitching 1 1/3 innings of scoreless relief against the Seattle Mariners. Sawamura was placed on the injured list on July 23 due to right triceps inflammation; he returned to the Red Sox on July 30. He was placed on the COVID-related list on August 31, and returned to the team on September 13. Overall during the regular season, Sawamura made 55 relief appearances for Boston, compiling a 5–1 record with 3.06 ERA while striking out 61 batters in 53 innings. He made three postseason relief appearances, all in the American League Championship Series, allowing a single run in two innings pitched.

Sawamura began the 2022 season as a member of the Red Sox bullpen. After posting a 3.60 ERA in 18 relief appearances, he was optioned to the Triple-A Worcester Red Sox on May 28, but recalled to Boston two days later. On August 29, Sawamura was designated for assignment, then sent outright to Triple-A two days later. On September 11, Sawamura was released by the Red Sox. Overall during 49 relief appearances with the Red Sox during 2022, Sawamura compiled a 1–1 record with a 3.73 ERA while striking out 40 batters in 50 2/3 innings.

=== Chiba Lotte Marines (second stint) ===
On January 28, 2023, Sawamura signed with the Chiba Lotte Marines of Nippon Professional Baseball (NPB). On August 10, it was announced that Sawamura had been diagnosed with reversible cerebral vasoconstriction syndrome and spent a short stint in the hospital. As a result, he was prohibited from performing strenuous exercise for the month of August.

Sawamura made 20 appearances for Lotte during the 2025 season, compiling an 0-1 record and 3.93 ERA with 10 strikeouts across 18 1/3 innings pitched. On October 9, 2025, Lotte announced that they would not retain Sawamura for the 2026 campaign.

On January 8, 2026, Sawamura announced his retirement from professional baseball.

== International career ==
Sawamura was selected to the Japan national baseball team for the 2013 World Baseball Classic. He also pitched for Japan in the 2015 WBSC Premier12 tournament.

== Scouting report ==
Sawamura throws a fastball topping out at 99 mph (159 km/h), a splitter, and a slider. In college, he also featured a curveball.

== Personal ==
Sawamura gained attention from NBC Sports for singing a rendition of an Alicia Keys song that Eduardo Rodríguez posted on his Instagram account.

== See also ==
- List of Major League Baseball players from Japan
