= Yoshihito Ishii =

Japanese baseball player (born 1978)

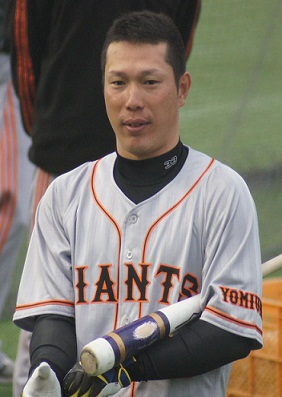
- Infielder
- Born: June 12, 1978 (age 47); Kawaguchi, Saitama, Japan
- Bats: Left-handed Throws: Right-handed

NPB debut
- September 25, 1997, for the Yokohama BayStars

NPB statistics (through 2012 season)
- Batting average: .293
- Hits: 631
- Home runs: 30
- RBI: 14

Teams
- Yokohama BayStars (1997–2002); Seibu Lions/Saitama Seibu Lions (2003–2011); Yomiuri Giants (2012–2014)

Career highlights and awards
- 2012 CLCS MVP
- Last updated on: November 10, 2012

Yoshihito Ishii (石井 義人, Ishii Yoshihito; born July 12, 1978 in Kawaguchi, Saitama) is a Japanese infielder for the Yomiuri Giants in Japan's Nippon Professional Baseball.
