= Takeya Nakamura =

Japanese baseball player (born 1983)

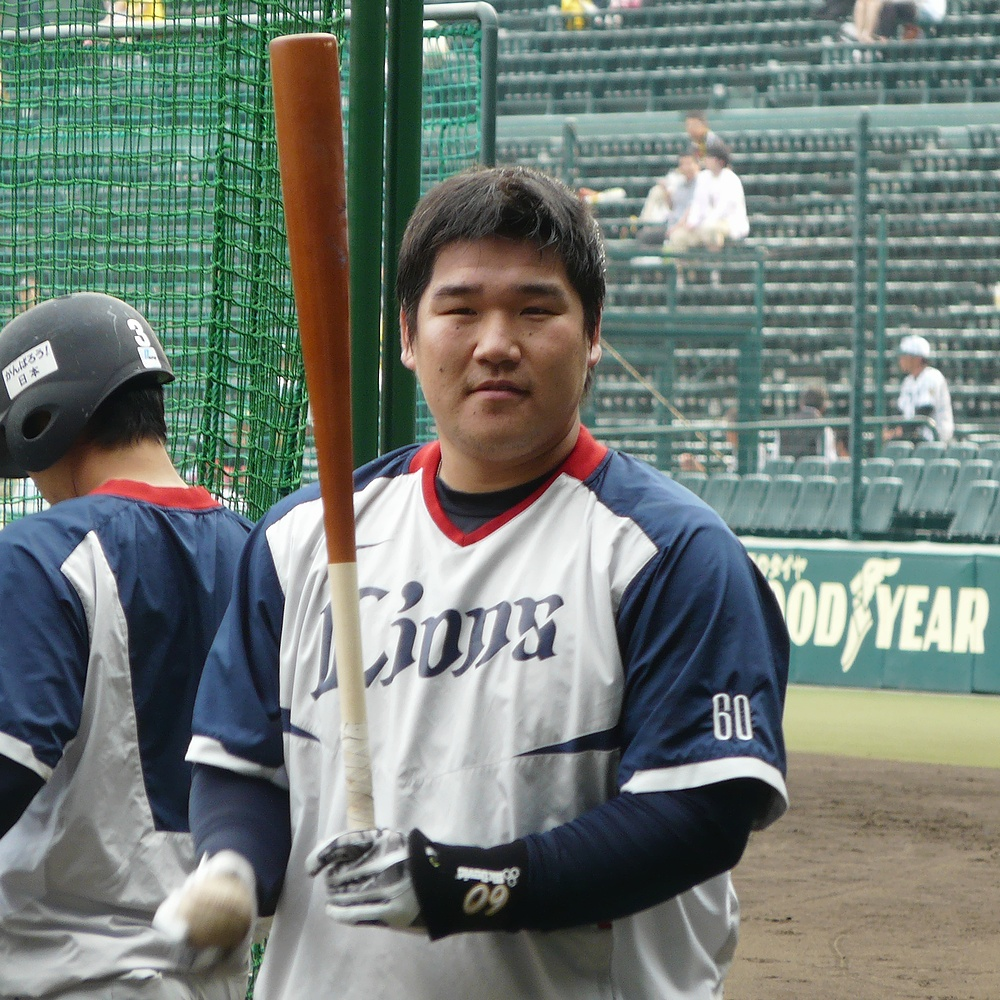
- Nakamura with the Saitama Seibu Lions

Saitama Seibu Lions – No. 60
- Third baseman, Designated Hitter
- Born: August 15, 1983 (age 43); Daitō, Osaka, Japan
- Bats: Right Throws: Right

NPB debut
- September 28, 2003, for the Seibu Lions

Career statistics (through 2026 season)
- Batting average: .252
- Hits: 1,844
- Home runs: 482
- Runs batted in: 1,374
- Stolen base: 28
- Stats at Baseball Reference

Teams
- Seibu Lions / Saitama Seibu Lions (2002–present)

Career highlights and awards
- 10× NPB All-Star (2008–2012, 2015, 2019, 2021, 2023, 2024); Japan Series champion (2008); 7× Best Nine Award (2008, 2009, 2011, 2012, 2014, 2015, 2019); 6x Pacific League home run leader (2008, 2009, 2011, 2012, 2014, 2015); 4x Pacific League RBI leader (2009, 2011, 2015, 2019); All-Star Game MVP (2011); 3x Home Run Derby champion (2009, 2011x2)
Medals
Men's baseball
Representing Japan
2015 WBSC Premier12
Bronze medal – third place	2015 Tokyo	Team

Takeya Nakamura (中村 剛也, Nakamura Takeya) (born August 15, 1983, in Daitō, Osaka) is a Japanese professional baseball infielder for the Saitama Seibu Lions of Nippon Professional Baseball (NPB). Nicknamed "Okawari-kun (おかわり君)" (roughly translating to second helpings) for his large, overweight frame, Nakamura is one of Japan's premier power hitters.

== Career ==
Nakamura joined the Seibu Lions of Nippon Professional Baseball in 2002, and spent the year with the team's farm team (minor leagues), and also began the 2003 season at the farm. On September 28, 2003, Nakamura made his NPB debut. In 2004, Nakamura played in 28 games with the team and hit .273. Nakamura collected the most playing time he had had in a season in 2005 and slashed .262/.320/.603 with 22 home runs and 57 RBI in 80 games. In 2006, Nakamura played in 100 games with Seibu and slashed .276/.359/.428. In 2007, Nakamura played in 98 games with the team and registered a 230/.316/.394 slash line.

Playing his first full season in 2008, Nakamura belted a league-high 46 home runs and drove in 101 runs despite a .244 batting average. He raised his average to .285 in the 2009 season and set a career high with 48 home runs to lead the league for the second straight year. He also increased his RBI output to 122 in just 128 games. After playing only 85 games in 2010 (still managing 25 home runs), Nakamura played all 144 games in 2011 and tied his own career high with 48 home runs. After a slight decline in production (due in part to missed time) from 2012 to 2014 (.231 with 27 home runs in 2012, .208 with 4 home run in 2013, and .257 with 34 home runs in 2014), Nakamura had another extremely productive season in 2015 with 37 home runs and a career-high 124 RBI, both of which led the Pacific League. He set a career high in hits (145) and his .278 average and 35 doubles were his best since 2009. By the end of 2015 at age 31, Nakamura has recorded more than 300 career home runs and 500 extra-base hits, and is climbing up the ranks of NPB's all-time home runs list. He had also been named an All-Star in 2011.

In 2016, Nakamura played in 108 games with Seibu and slashed .238/.313/.447 with 21 home runs and 61 RBI. The following year, he posted a .217/.319/.446 slash with 27 home runs and 79 RBI. In 2018 with the team, Nakamura played in 97 games and recorded a .265/.329/.526 batting line with 28 home runs and 74 RBI. For the 2019 season, Nakamura logged a .286/.359/.528 batting line with 30 home runs and 123 RBI, one RBI short of his career-high. In the COVID-19 pandemic delayed 2020 season, Nakamura hit .213/.310/.372 with 9 home runs and 31 RBI in 79 games. After hitting .277/.335/.424 with 9 home runs and 38 RBI in the first half of the 2021 season, Nakamura was named an All-Star for the eighth time in his career.

On July 6, 2022, Nakamura set the all-time record for strikeouts by a batter with 1,956, passing Kazuhiro Kiyohara.

== See also ==
- List of top Nippon Professional Baseball home run hitters
