= Tomotaka Sakaguchi =

Japanese baseball player

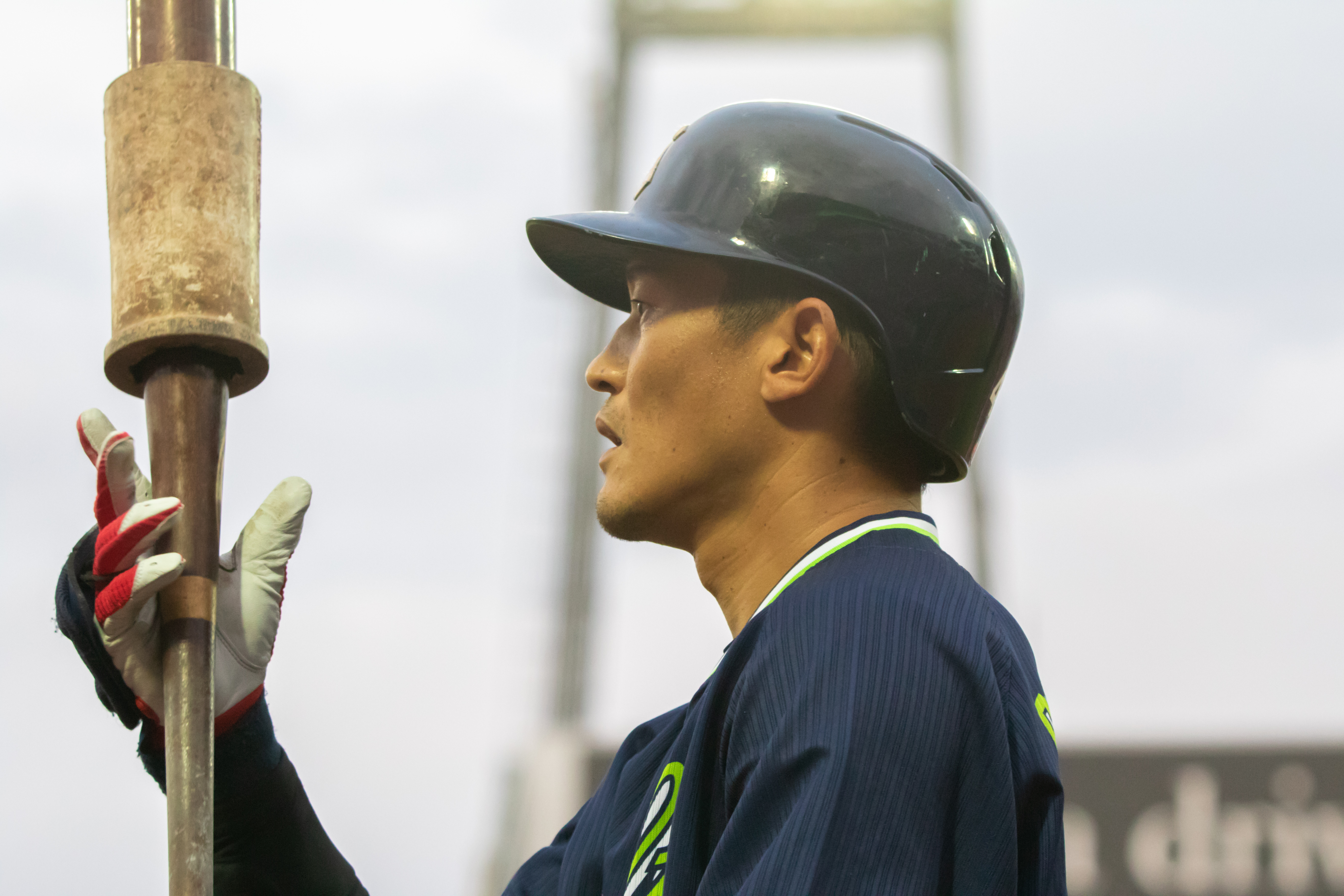
- Sakaguchi in 2018
- Outfielder / First baseman
- Born: July 7, 1984 (age 41)
- Batted: Left Threw: Right

NPB debut
- October 7, 2003, for the Osaka Kintetsu Buffaloes

Last NPB appearance
- October 3, 2022, for the Tokyo Yakult Swallows

NPB statistics
- Batting average: .278
- Hits: 1,526
- Home runs: 38
- RBIs: 418
- Stolen bases: 85
- Stats at Baseball Reference

Teams
- Osaka Kintetsu Buffaloes (2003–2004); Orix Buffaloes (2005–2015); Tokyo Yakult Swallows (2016–2022)

Career highlights and awards
- 2× NPB All-Star (2011, 2018); 4× Mitsui Golden Glove Award (2008–2011); 1× Japan Series champion (2021)

Tomotaka Sakaguchi (坂口 智隆, born July 7, 1984, in Akashi, Hyōgo) is a Japanese former professional baseball outfielder. He played in Japan's Nippon Professional Baseball (NPB) for the Osaka Kintetsu Buffaloes, Orix Buffaloes, and Tokyo Yakult Swallows from 2003 to 2022.

== Career ==
As of 2022, he was the last active NPB player to have played with the Kintestu Buffaloes. On September 28, 2022, Sakaguchi announced his retirement from professional baseball.
