= Soma Yamauchi =

Japanese baseball player

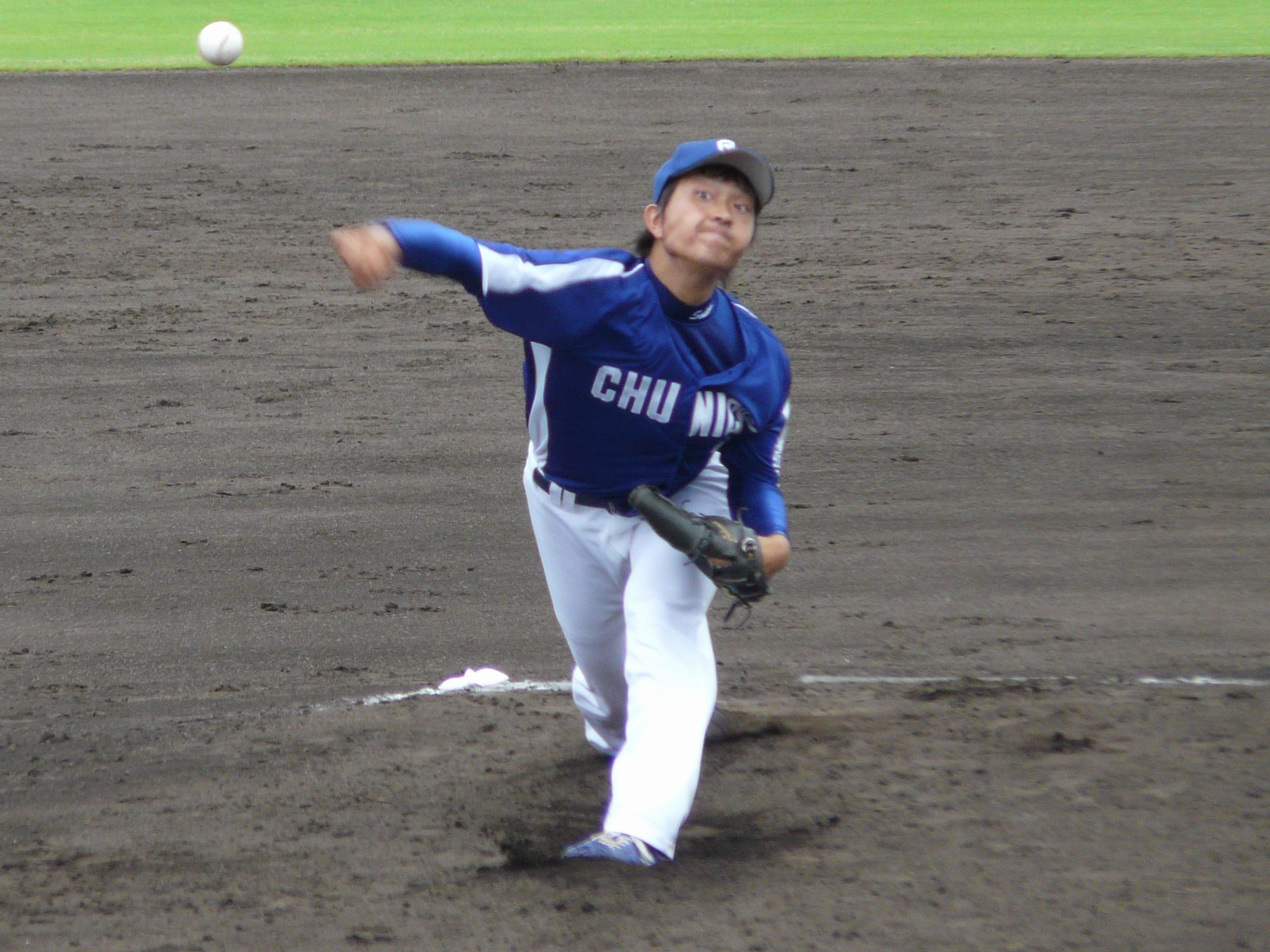
- Pitcher
- Born: July 1, 1985 (age 40)
- Bats: Right Throws: Right

NPB debut
- 2008, for the Chunichi Dragons

NPB statistics (through 2016)
- Win–loss record: 17–15
- ERA: 3.01
- Strikeouts: 153
- Stats at Baseball Reference

Teams
- Chunichi Dragons (2008–2014); Tohoku Rakuten Golden Eagles (2016)

Soma Yamauchi (山内 壮馬, born July 1, 1985, in Toyota, Aichi) is a Japanese former professional baseball pitcher in Japan's Nippon Professional Baseball. He played for the Chunichi Dragons from 2008 to 2014 and for the Tohoku Rakuten Golden Eagles in 2016.
