= Tetsuya Yamaguchi =

Japanese baseball player

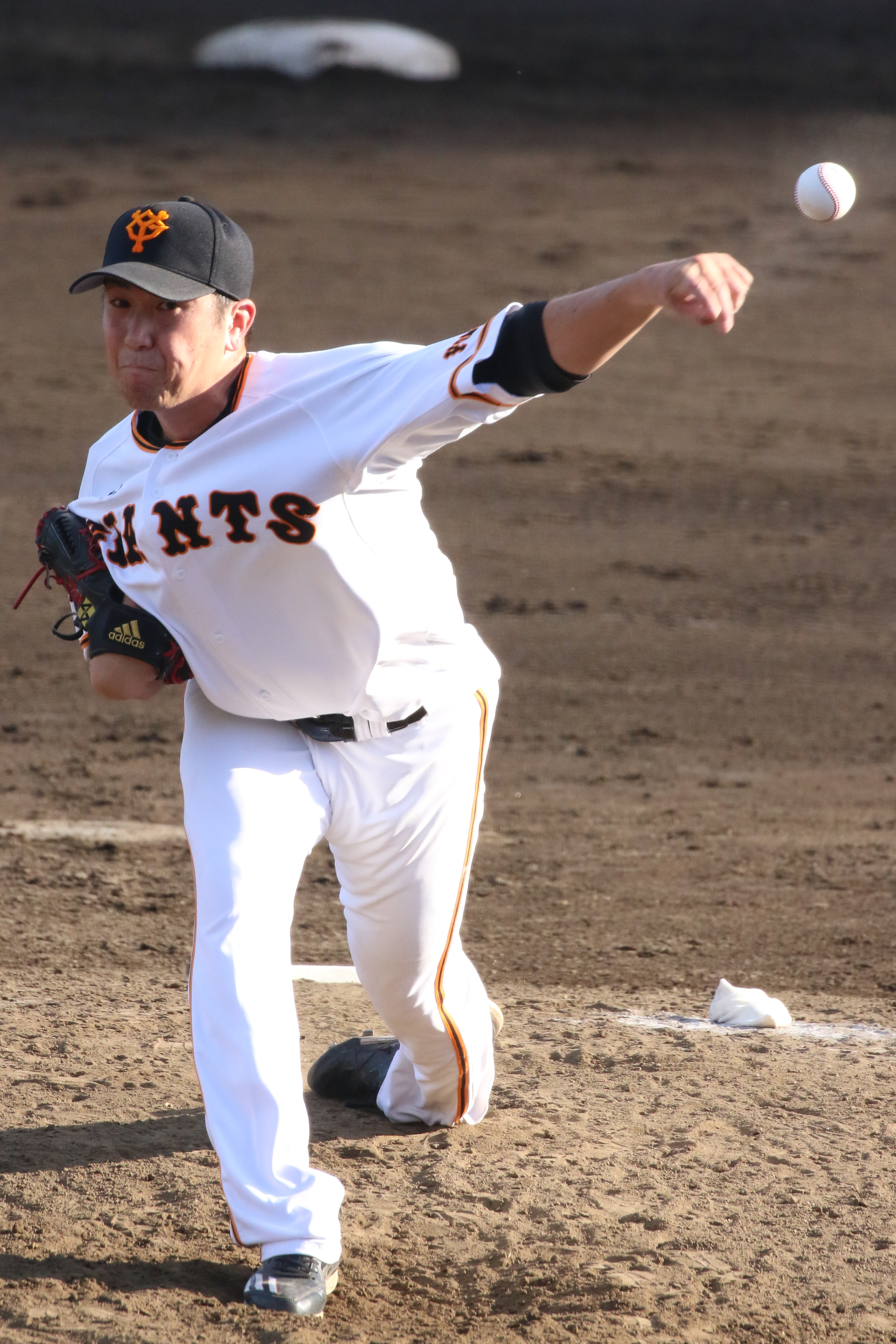
- Yamaguchi with the Yomiuri Giants

Yomiuri Giants – No. 71
- Pitcher / Coach
- Born: November 11, 1983 (age 42); Yokohama, Kanagawa, Japan
- Batted: Left Threw: Left

NPB debut
- April 29, 2007, for the Yomiuri Giants

Last NPB appearance
- 2018, for the Yomiuri Giants

NPB statistics (through 2018 season)
- Win–loss record: 52-27
- ERA: 2.34
- Strikeouts: 509
- Holds: 273
- Stats at Baseball Reference

Teams
- As player: Yomiuri Giants (2007–2018); As coach: Yomiuri Giants (2020–present)

Career highlights and awards
- 2008 Central League Rookie of the Year; 3× Central League Middle Reliever of the Year (2009, 2012-2013); 2× Japan Series champion (2009, 2012)
Medals
Representing Japan
Men's baseball
World Baseball Classic
Gold medal – first place	2009 Los Angeles	Team

Tetsuya Yamaguchi (山口 鉄也, Yamaguchi Tetsuya; born November 11, 1983) is a former Japanese Nippon Professional Baseball player with the Yomiuri Giants in Japan's Central League.

== Career ==
He was playing in the Missoula Osprey (Advanced Rookie level under Arizona Diamondbacks) before he was drafted by the Giants in 2005.

He was awarded as Central League's Rookie of the Year in 2008, beating his teammate and another award favorite Hayato Sakamoto, by finishing with an 11-2 with 67 appearances, the most wins of all-time in Giants' relief pitchers.

On October 5, 2018, he announced retirement after the season.

== International career ==
He was selected Japan national baseball team at the 2009 World Baseball Classic and 2013 World Baseball Classic.
