= Kazuki Yoshimi =

Japanese baseball player

Kazuki Yoshimi 吉見一起
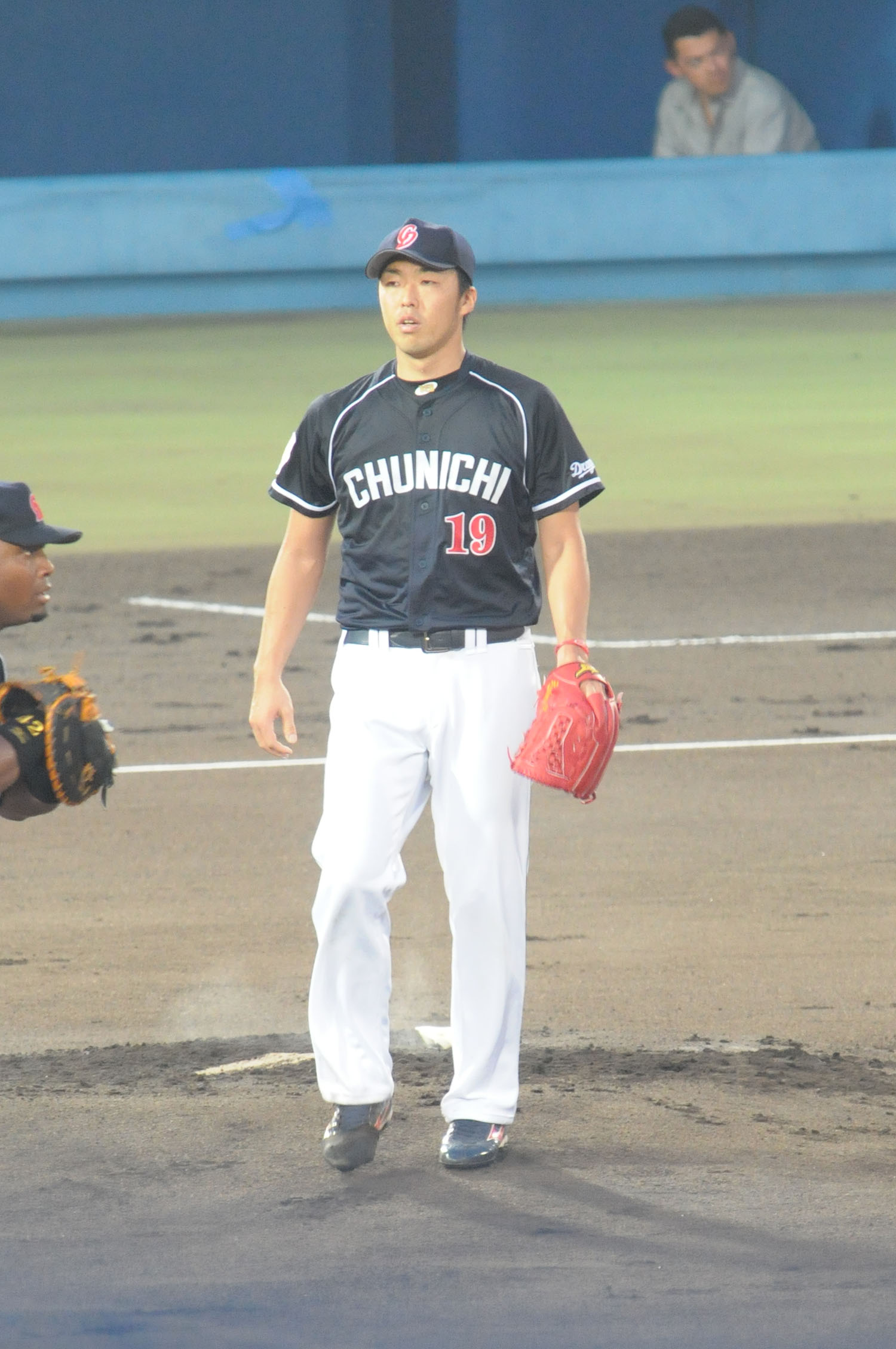
- Yoshimi with the Chunichi Dragons in 2012
- Pitcher
- Born: September 19, 1984 (age 41); Kyoto, Japan
- Batted: Right Threw: Right

NPB debut
- September 10, 2006, for the Chunichi Dragons

Last NPB appearance
- November 6, 2020, for the Chunichi Dragons

Career statistics (through 2020 season)
- Win-Loss: 90-56
- ERA: 2.94
- Strikeouts: 845
- Stats at Baseball Reference

Teams
- Chunichi Dragons (2006 –2020)

Career highlights and awards
- 1x Central League ERA Champion (2011); 2x Central League Wins leader (2009, 2011); 1x Central League Best Nine Award (2011); Central League Battery Award, with Motonobu Tanishige (2011); 2011 CLCS MVP

Kazuki Yoshimi (吉見 一起, Yoshimi Kazuki; born September 19, 1984) is a Japanese former professional baseball pitcher. As a player, Yoshimi spent his entire 15-year career in Nippon Professional Baseball (NPB) with the Chunichi Dragons.

== Early career ==
Yoshimi started playing baseball in Grade 2 of elementary school. At high school, Yoshimi was the ace for Konkō Ōsaka High School and took his team to the second round of the 2002 Japanese High School Baseball Invitational Tournament.

After graduating high school, Yoshimi joined Toyota's corporate baseball team where he was regarded as one of the best players in industrial league baseball. During this time, he underwent surgery on his elbow which reduced the hype surrounding him.

== Professional career ==
Chunichi Dragons selected Yoshimi in the 2005 NPB draft.

On September 10, 2006, Yoshimi was registered for the first-team for the first time and debuted against the Hiroshima Toyo Carp with an untarnished 1.1 innings. On September 18, Yoshimi would claim his first win, this time against the Yokohama DeNA Baystars where he pitching 5 innings for 2 earned runs. In the 2006 Japan Series he was used in relief.

In 2007, Yoshimi was named MVP of the Japanese Farm Team National Championships and would later take part in the Dominican Winter League where he would pitch for Estrellas Orientales.

On November 1, 2020, Yoshimi announced his retirement. On November 5, 2020, he held press conference.
