= Akagawa Motoyasu =

- 赤川 元保
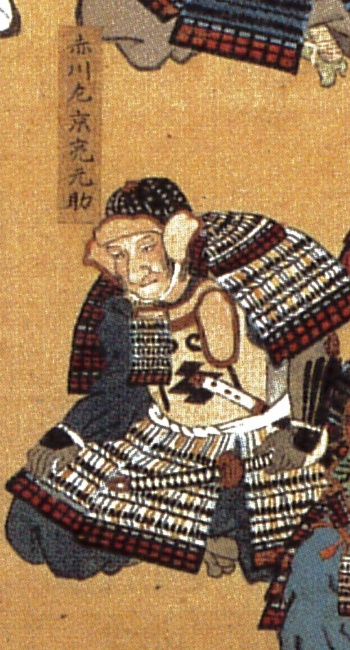
- Akagawa Motoyasu
- Died: March 1567
- Relatives: Akagawa Fusanobu
- Military career
- Allegiance: Japanese
- Rank: Samurai

Akagawa Motoyasu (赤川 元保) (died March 1567) was a Japanese samurai of the Sengoku period. Motoyasu was the son of Akagawa Fusanobu, the former head of the Akagawa clan. Motoyasu became the head of the Akagawa clan following the death in battle of his older brother, Akagawa Narihide. He also became one of the 18 generals of the Mori Clan, and was a close adviser to Mōri Takamoto, the head of the Mōri clan.

Motoyasu was imprisoned in his home under suspicion of the sudden death of Mōri Takamoto. He was later forced to commit suicide with his adopted son Akagawa Matasaburō in 1567. The heir to the Akagawa clan was named Akagawa Nobuyuki, Motoyasu's nephew. Motoyasu was also known by his court title Sakyō-no-suke (左京亮).
