= Daisuke Fujimura =

Japanese baseball player (born 1989)

Daisuke Fujimura 藤村 大介
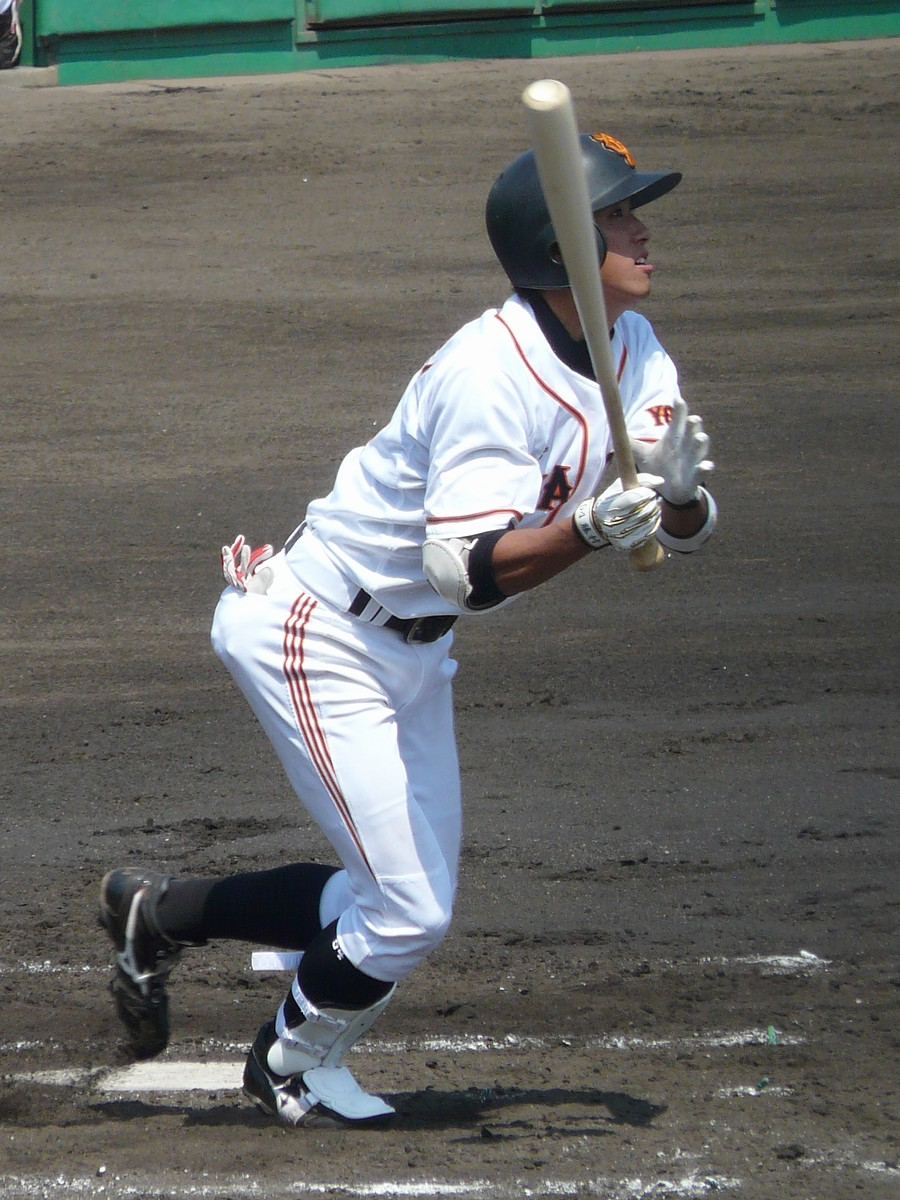
- Fujimara with the Yomiuri Giants
- Second baseman, Short stop, Coach
- Born: July 25, 1989 (age 37); Kumamoto, Kumamoto
- Batted: Left Threw: Right

NPB debut
- May 10, 2011, for the Yomiuri Giants

Last appearance
- July 27, 2016, for the Yomiuri Giants

NPB statistics (through 2017)
- Batting average: .226
- Hits: 156
- Home runs: 0
- RBIs: 27
- Stolen bases: 49
- Stats at Baseball Reference

Teams
- As player: Yomiuri Giants (2008–2017); As coach: Yomiuri Giants (2019–2020)

Career highlights and awards
- Central League Stolen Base Leader (2011)

Daisuke Fujimura (藤村 大介, Fujimura Daisuke; born July 25, 1989) is a former Japanese Infielder with the Yomiuri Giants.
