= Tetsuya Yamamoto =

Japanese baseball player (born 1985)

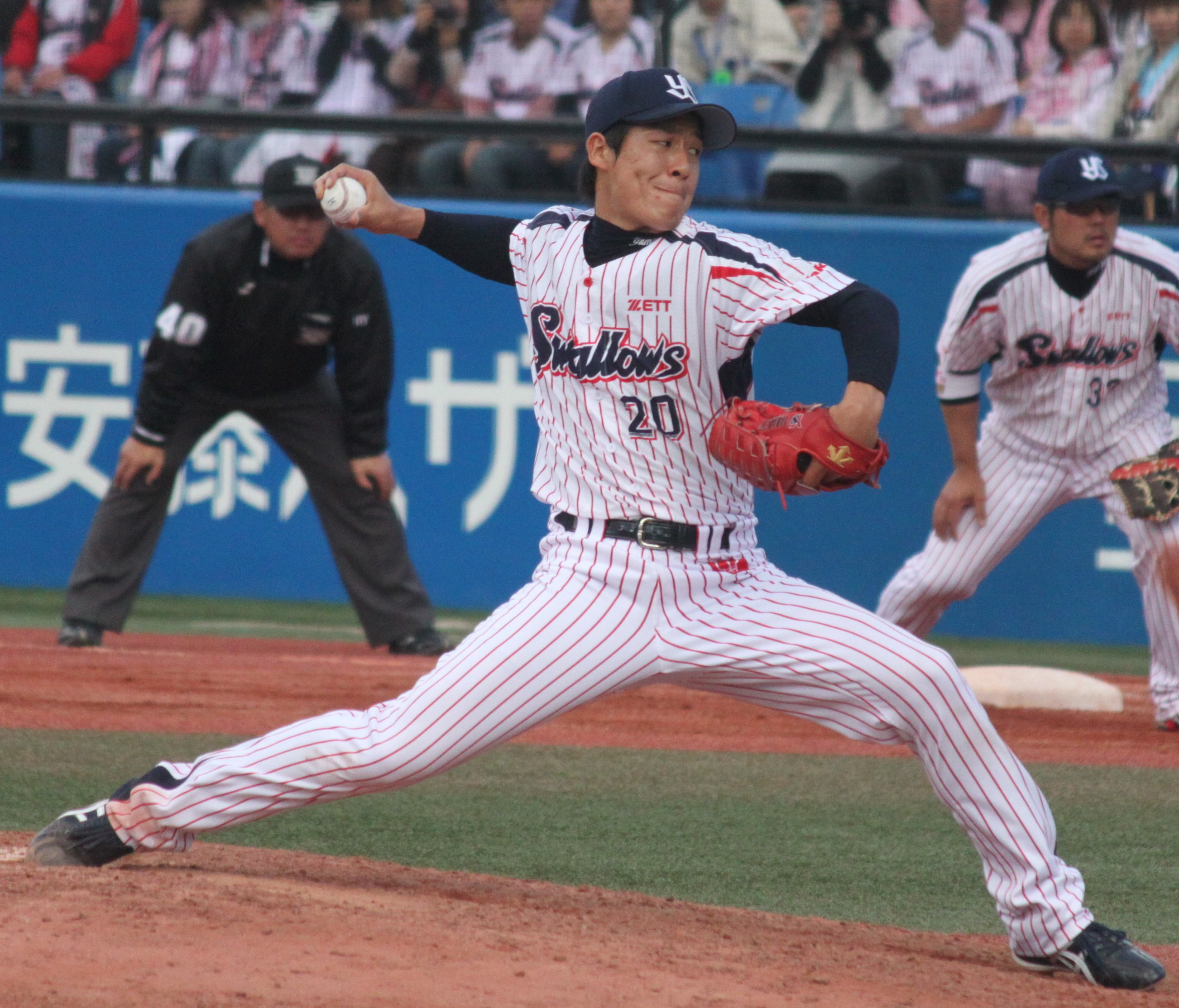

Tokyo Yakult Swallows – No. 92
- Pitcher / Coach
- Born: September 4, 1985 (age 40); Hidaka District, Wakayama, Japan
- Batted: Right Threw: Right

NPB debut
- August 20, 2011, for the Tokyo Yakult Swallows

Last NPB appearance
- October 8, 2018, for the Tokyo Yakult Swallows

NPB statistics
- Win–loss record: 6-11
- ERA: 3.07
- Strikeouts: 124
- Saves: 14
- Holds: 55
- Stats at Baseball Reference

Teams
- As player: Tokyo Yakult Swallows (2010–2018); As coach: Tokyo Yakult Swallows (2021–present)

Career highlights and awards
- 1× NPB All-Star (2013)

Tetsuya Yamamoto (山本 哲哉, Yamamoto Tetsuya; born September 4, 1985 in Hidaka, Wakayama, Japan) is a professional Japanese baseball player. He plays pitcher for the Tokyo Yakult Swallows.
