= Katsuki Akagawa =

Japanese baseball player (born 1990)

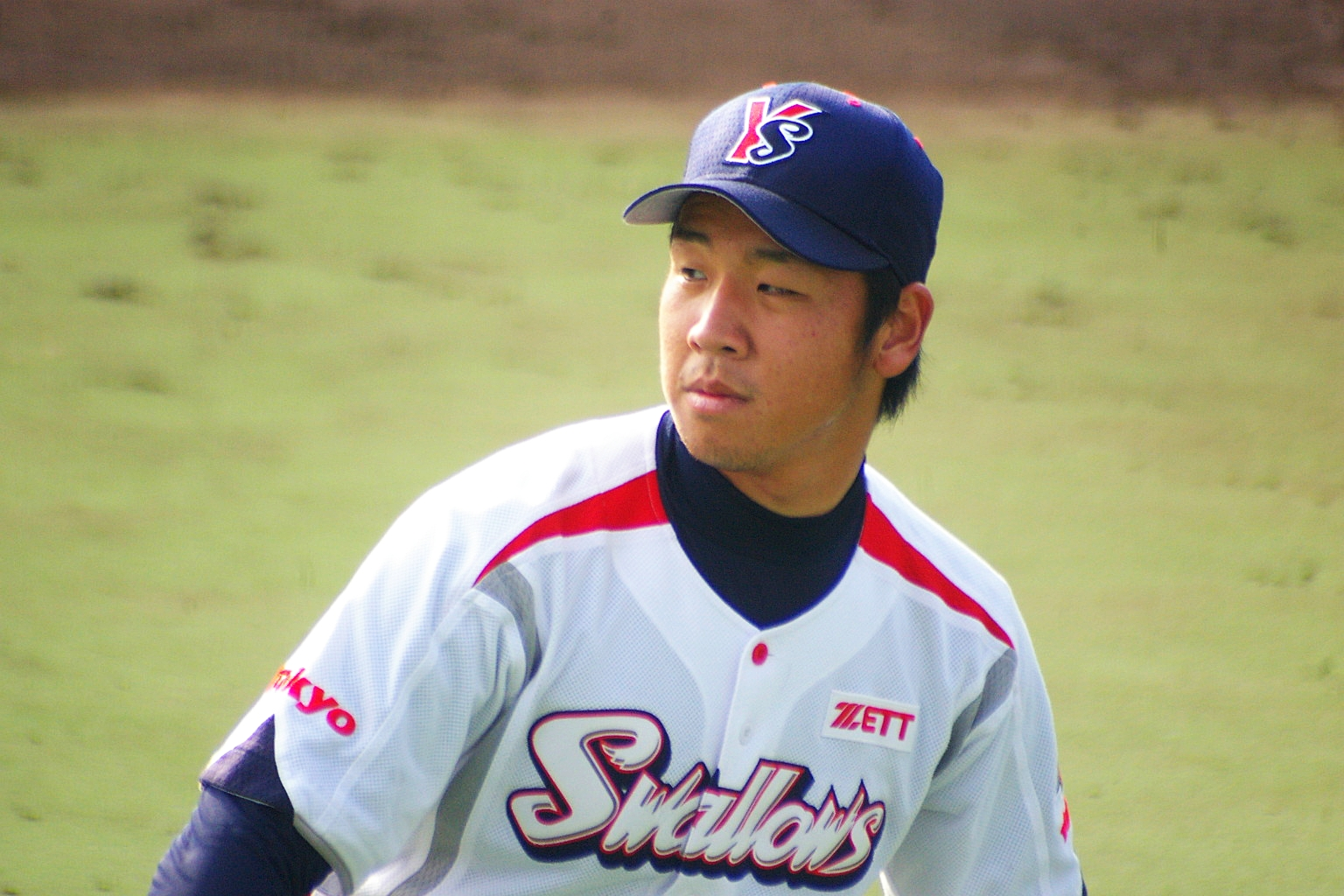
- Pitcher
- Born: July 31, 1990 (age 35); Miyazaki, Miyazaki, Japan
- Bats: Left Throws: Left

debut
- September 9, 2009, for the Tokyo Yakult Swallows

NPB statistics (through 2015)
- Win–loss record: 14-20
- ERA: 4.17
- Strikeouts: 202
- Stats at Baseball Reference

Teams
- Tokyo Yakult Swallows (2009–2015)

Career highlights and awards
- 1× NPB All-Star (2012)

Katsuki Akagawa (赤川 克紀, Akagawa Katsuki; born July 31, 1990) is a professional Japanese baseball player.

== Biography ==
=== Before turning pro ===
He started playing softball in the second grade of elementary school and was a member of the softball club in junior high school. In the semifinals of the Miyazaki Tournament in his junior year, he threw 193 pitches in 15 extra innings and contributed to the team's fourth appearance in the Koshien Tournament in 39 years. In the first game against Johoku High School, he allowed one run in eight innings, helping the team to its first victory in 44 years, and in the second game against Kagoshima Jitsugyo High School, he lost the game but pitched 12 extra innings by himself and was selected for the All-Japan High School Team.

He was selected as the first overall pick by the Tokyo Yakult Swallows in the 2008 draft.

=== During his time with the Yakult ===
On September 9, 2009, in a game against the Hiroshima Toyo Carp, he pitched his first professional game as the third baseman in the 9th inning trailing by six runs. He gave up three hits, including a homer, one walk, two walks, and three runs without allowing a single hit or walk.

In 2010, he was selected to represent Japan in the 17th IBAF Intercontinental Cup held in Taiwan.

In 2011, he pitched five scoreless innings against the Yokohama Bay Stars on August 18, 2011, his first professional win, and on September 26, 2011, against the Chunichi Dragons, he pitched a perfect game for the first time in his professional career despite giving up one run after two outs in the ninth inning. He also pitched in the Climax Series. He also pitched in the Climax Series, and in the third game of the first stage against the Yomiuri Giants on November 1, he pitched 6 2/3 innings without allowing a run to lead the team to victory.

In 2012, he was selected for his first All-Star Game by manager's recommendation, and pitched in the 6th inning of Game 3, allowing no hits in 3 innings and winning the SKYACTIV TECHNOLOGY Award (the most memorable player for fans over the 3 games). He finished the season with an 8-9 record as a starting rotation pitcher, and became the first professional pitcher to reach the regulation innings pitched.
