= Junki Itō =

Japanese baseball player

Junki Itō 伊藤準規
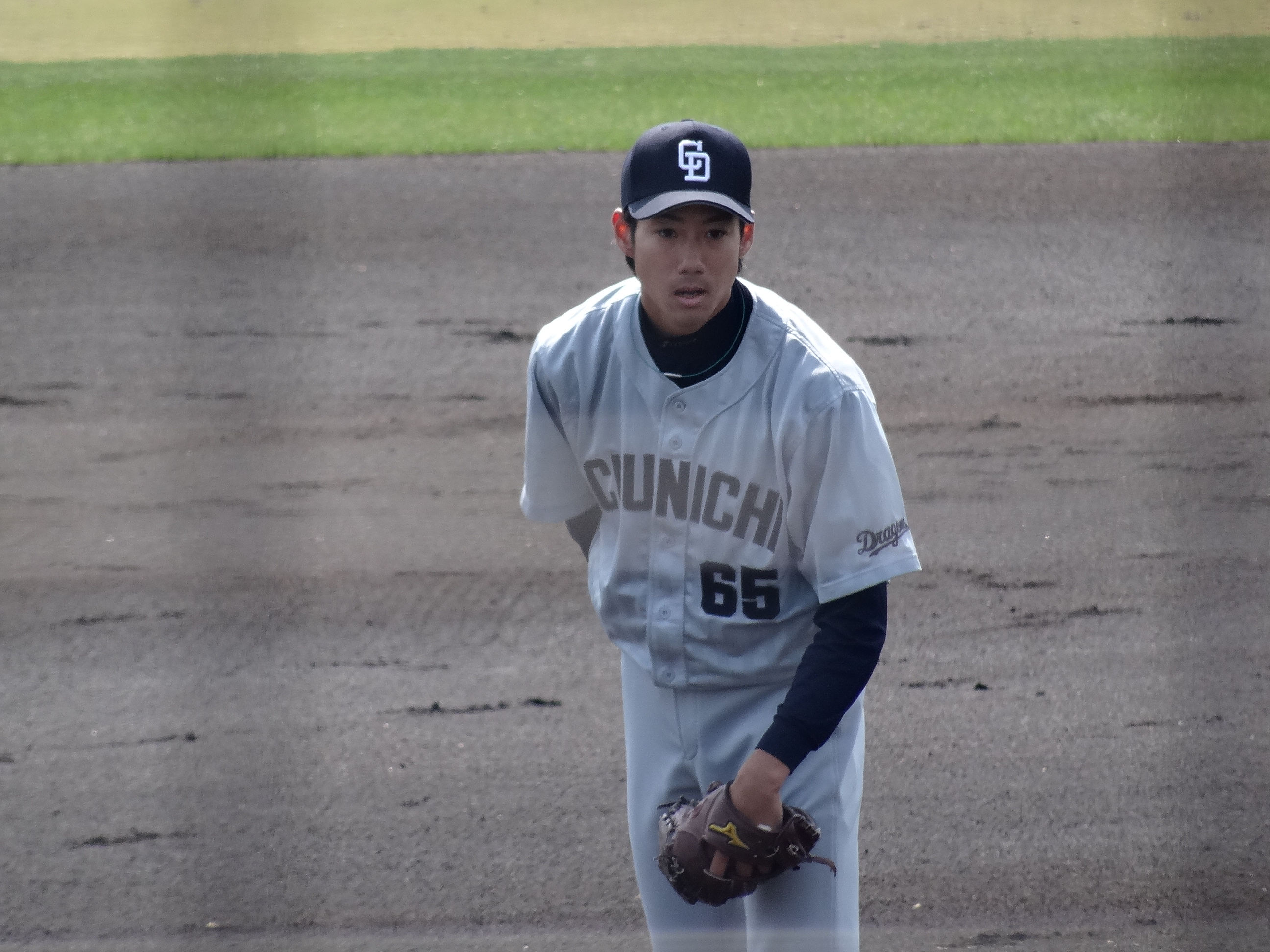
- Pitcher
- Born: January 7, 1991 (age 35); Inazawa, Aichi Prefecture
- Batted: Left Threw: Right

NPB debut
- September 30, 2009, for the Chunichi Dragons

Last NPB appearance
- June 18, 2019, for the Chunichi Dragons

NPB statistics (through 2020 season)
- Win–loss record: 7–11
- ERA: 4.26
- Strikeouts: 146
- Stats at Baseball Reference

Teams
- Chunichi Dragons (2009–2020)

Junki Itō (伊藤 準規, born January 7, 1991) is a Japanese former professional baseball pitcher. He has played in Nippon Professional Baseball (NPB) for the Chunichi Dragons.

== Career ==
Chunichi Dragons selected Itō with the second selection in the 2008 NPB draft.

On September 30, 2009, Itō made his NPB debut.

On December 2, 2020, he became a free agent. On December 8, 2020, he announced his retirement.
