= Tatsuyoshi Masubuchi =

Japanese baseball player (born 1988)

- Pitcher
- Born: May 3, 1988 (age 37); Sōka, Saitama, Japan
- Bats: Right Throws: Right

debut
- April 7, 2007, for the Tokyo Yakult Swallows

Teams
- Tokyo Yakult Swallows (2007–2014); Hokkaido Nippon-Ham Fighters (2014–2015)

Tatsuyoshi Masubuchi (増渕 竜義, Masubuchi Tatsuyoshi; born May 3, 1988 in Sōka, Saitama, Japan) is a professional Japanese baseball player.
