= Tetsuya Utsumi =

Japanese baseball player

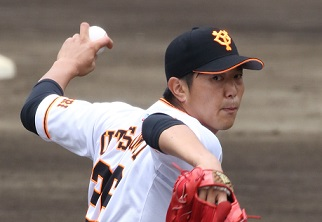
- Utsumi with the Yomiuri Giants

Yomiuri Giants – No. 77
- Pitcher / Coach
- Born: April 29, 1982 (age 43); Kyoto, Japan
- Batted: Left Threw: Left

NPB debut
- May 25, 2004, for the Yomiuri Giants

Last NPB appearance
- September 19, 2022, for the Saitama Seibu Lions

NPB statistics (through 2022 season)
- Win–loss: 135-104
- ERA: 3.24
- Strikeouts: 1,519

Teams
- As player: Yomiuri Giants (2004–2018); Saitama Seibu Lions (2019–2022); As coach: Saitama Seibu Lions (2023); Yomiuri Giants (2024–present)

Career highlights and awards
- 2× Japan Series champion (2009, 2012); Japan Series MVP (2012)
Medals
Representing Japan
Men's baseball
World Baseball Classic
Gold medal – first place	2009 Los Angeles	Team

Tetsuya Utsumi (内海 哲也, Utsumi Tetsuya; born April 29, 1982 in Kyoto, Japan) is a Japanese professional baseball player for the Saitama Seibu Lions of Nippon Professional Baseball(NPB). He previously played for the Yomiuri Giants.

== Career ==
In 2000 NPB draft, Orix BlueWave selected him with the first selection, but he did not sign, and he joined Tokyo Gas in the Japanese industrial leagues from 2000 to 2003.

In 2003 NPB draft, Yomiuri Giants selected him and joined.

On December 20, 2018, he was sent to Saitama Seibu Lions as the human compensation from the earlier transferred for Ginjiro Sumitani.

== International career ==
He was selected Japan national baseball team at the 2009 World Baseball Classic and 2013 World Baseball Classic.

And also, in a 2008 preseason exhibition game against the Boston Red Sox, Utsumi struck out 4 out of the 6 Red Sox batters he faced.

== Pitching style ==
Utsumi is a "junkball" pitcher, meaning that he does not have overpowering pitches. His fastball is usually in the 140 km/h (87 MPH) range, and he complements it with a slurve, a changeup, and a forkball. Utsumi relies on his control to get batters out, and it is usually pretty good, but when Utsumi misses his spots, that is when trouble finds him, usually in the form of home runs.
