= List of Chunichi Dragons managers =

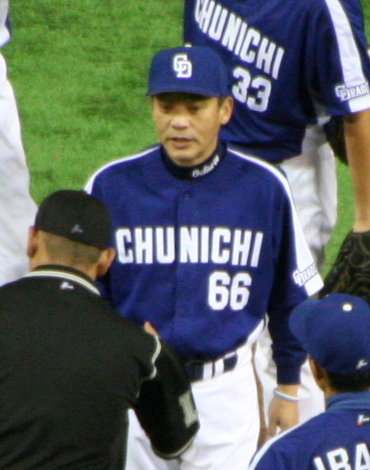
Hiromitsu Ochiai is the most successful manager of the Chunichi Dragons.

The Chunichi Dragons are a professional baseball team based in Nagoya, Aichi, Japan. The Dragons are members of the Central League (CL) in Nippon Professional Baseball (NPB). In baseball, the head coach of a team is called the manager, or more formally, the field manager. The duties of the team manager include team strategy and leadership on and off the field.

Since their inception as Nagoya Club in 1936, the Dragons have employed 30 managers.

As one of the founding members of the NPB, the team has employed 30 managers (including four on an interim basis only), winning two Japan Series titles and eight Central League pennants. The franchise's first manager was hall of famer, Yutaka Ikeda, who managed the team for one year and who won 19 games in 42 attempts. Chunichi's most successful season came under another hall of famer, Shunichi Amachi, who led the team to Central league victory in 1954 with a winning percentage of .683 to claim the team's first Central League and Japan Series crowns. He was the first manager with no professional baseball experience to do so in Japan. It took another 53 years for Chunichi to win its second Japan series in 2007, under the coaching of long-term manager Hiromitsu Ochiai. Ochiai would prove to be the Dragons' most successful manager, with four Central League pennants to go with his Japan Series win.

Former Chunichi ace pitcher and Eiji Sawamura Award winner Senichi Hoshino is the longest serving Dragons' manager, having had two stints with the team for an accumulated 11 years in the hot seat. He led the Dragons to the Central League pennant twice, in 1988 and 1999.

Long serving catcher and NPB appearance record holder Motonobu Tanishige became manager of the Dragons while still playing professionally in 2013. He retired in 2015 to focus on managing the team. Tanishige however was relieved of his post following a series of disappointing results on the 9th of August, 2016 with head coach Shigekazu Mori taking control of the team as interim manager and eventually as full-time manager.

Kimiyasu Kudō is the current manager.

== Table key ==
#	A running total of the number of Dragons managers. Any manager who has two or more separate terms is only counted once.
GM	Number of regular season games managed; may not equal sum of wins and losses due to tie games
W	Number of regular season wins in games managed
L	Number of regular season losses in games managed
T	Number of regular season ties in games managed
Win%	Winning percentage: number of wins divided by number of games managed
PA	Playoff appearances: number of years this manager has led the franchise to the playoffs
PW	Playoff wins: number of wins this manager has accrued in the playoffs
PL	Playoff losses: number of losses this manager has accrued in the playoffs
PT	Playoff ties: number of ties this manager has accrued in the playoffs
LC	League Championships: number of League Championships, or pennants, achieved by the manager
JS	Japan Series: number of Japan Series won by the manager
†	Elected to the Japanese Baseball Hall of Fame

== Managers ==
Statistics current through the 2024 season

#	Image	Manager	Seasons	GM	W	L	T	Win%	PA	PW	PL	PT	LC	JS
1		Yutaka Ikeda^{†}	1936	42	19	23	0	.452	—	—	—	—	—	—
2		Kaishi Masu	1937	105	34	68	3	.323	—	—	—	—	—	—
3		Yukisato Nemoto	1938–1939	107	40	61	6	.396	—	—	—	—	—	—
4		Tokuro Konishi^{†}	1939–1941	224	99	90	7	.505	—	—	—	—	—	—
5		Chikayoshi Honda	1941–1942	161	63	92	6	.406	—	—	—	—	—	—
—		Kaishi Masu	1943	84	48	29	7	.623	—	—	—	—	—	—
6		Daisuke Miyake^{†}	1944	35	13	21	1	.382	—	—	—	—	—	—
7		Yoshikazu Takeuchi	1946	36	13	21	2	.382	—	—	—	—	—	—
8		Kiyoshi Sugiura	1946–1948	328	148	172	8	.451	—	—	—	—	—	—
9		Shunichi Amachi^{†}	1949–1951	387	217	160	10	.561	—	—	—	—	—	—
10		Michinori Tsubouchi^{†}	1952–1953	250	145	100	5	.580	—	—	—	—	—	—
—		Shunichi Amachi^{†}	1954	130	86	40	4	.683	1	4	3	0	1	1
11		Akira Noguchi	1955–1956	260	151	108	1	.583	—	—	—	—	—	—
—		Shunichi Amachi^{†}	1957–1958	260	136	106	8	.523	—	—	—	—	—	—
12		Shigeru Sugishita^{†}	1959–1960	260	127	128	5	.488	—	—	—	—	—	—
13		Wataru Nohnin	1960–1962	263	142	106	5	.540	—	—	—	—	—	—
—		Kiyoshi Sugiura	1963–1964	196	101	92	3	.515	—	—	—	—	—	—
14		Michio Nishizawa^{†}	1963–1967	480	253	217	10	.538	—	—	—	—	—	—
—		Shigeru Sugishita^{†}	1968	134	50	80	4	.385	—	—	—	—	—	—
15		Itsuro Honda	1968	75	29	43	3	.403	—	—	—	—	—	—
16		Shigeru Mizuhara^{†}	1969–1971	390	179	195	16	.459	—	—	—	—	—	—
17		Wally Yonamine^{†}	1972–1977	780	388	349	43	.526	1	2	4	0	1	0
18		Toshio Naka	1978–1980	390	157	204	29	.435	—	—	—	—	—	—
19		Sadao Kondoh^{†}	1981–1983	390	176	181	33	.451	1	2	4	0	1	0
20		Kazuhiro Yamauchi^{†}	1984–1986	322	154	142	26	.478	—	—	—	—	—	—
21		Morimichi Takagi^{†}	1986	130	54	67	9	.446	—	—	—	—	—	—
22		Senichi Hoshino^{†}	1987–1991	652	348	283	21	.534	1	1	4	0	1	0
—		Morimichi Takagi^{†}	1992–1995	522	252	268	2	.483	—	—	—	—	—	—
23		Sadayuki Tokutake	1995	57	17	39	1	.304	—	—	—	—	—	—
24		Ikuo Shimano	1995	54	25	29	0	.463	—	—	—	—	—	—
—		Senichi Hoshino^{†}	1996–2001	809	418	385	6	.517	1	1	4	0	1	0
25		Hisashi Yamada^{†}	2002–2003	260	128	127	5	.502	—	—	—	—	—	—
26		Kyosuke Sasaki	2003	20	14	5	1	.700	—	—	—	—	—	—
27		Hiromitsu Ochiai^{†}	2004–2011	1,150	629	491	30	.562	5	13	14	1	4	1
—		Morimichi Takagi^{†}	2012–2013	288	139	130	19	.483	—	—	—	—	—	—
28		Motonobu Tanishige	2014–2016	396	172	208	11	.434	—	—	—	—	—	—
29		Shigekazu Mori	2016–2018	325	137	181	7	.421	—	—	—	—	—	—
30		Tsuyoshi Yoda	2019–2021	406	183	199	24	.451	—	—	—	—	—	—
31		Kazuyoshi Tatsunami^{†}	2022–2024	429	182	232	15	.440	—	—	—	—	—	—
