= Hiroyuki Watanabe (baseball) =

Japanese baseball player (born 1970)

Hiroyuki Watanabe 渡邉博幸
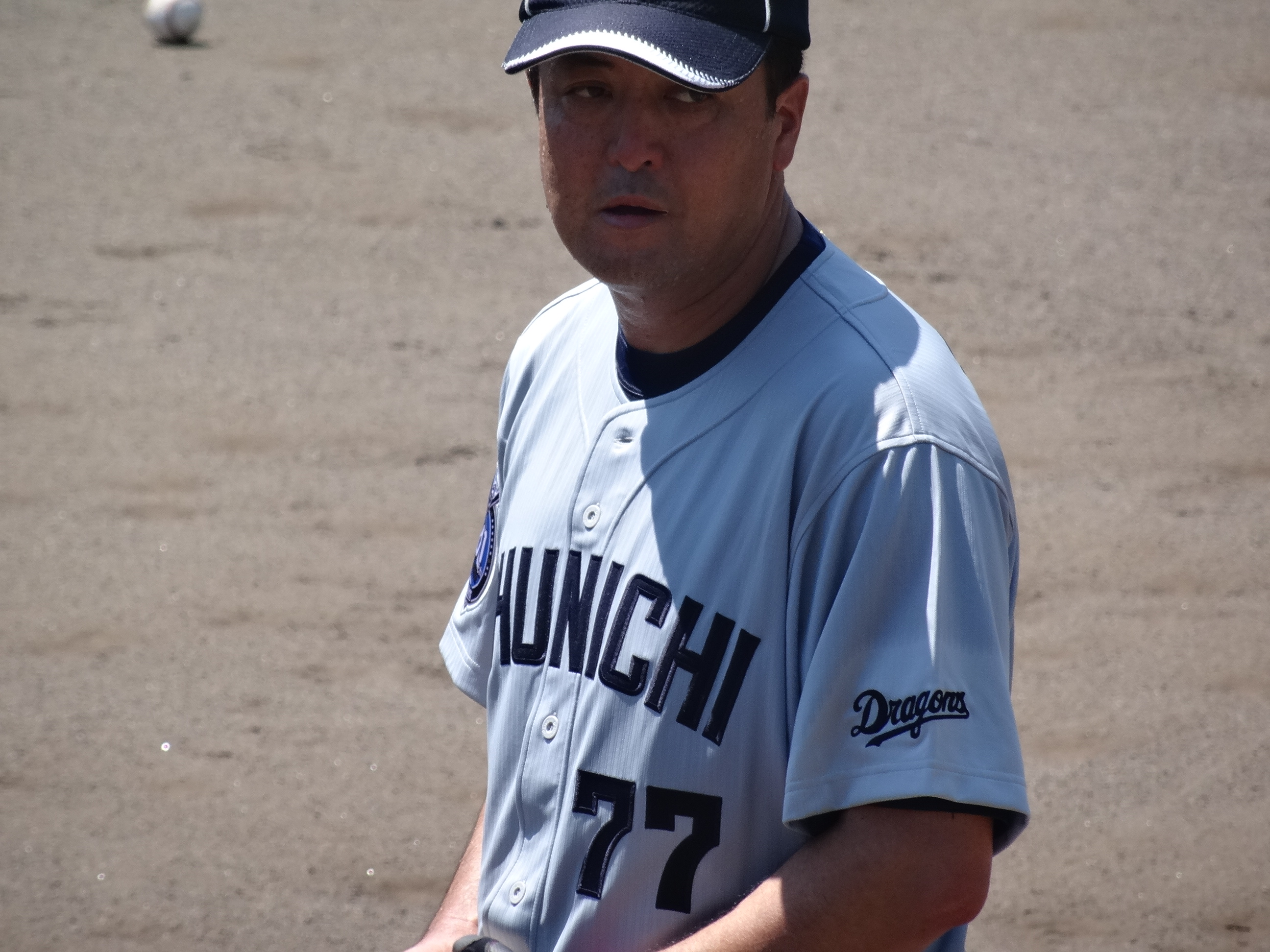

Chunichi Dragons – No. 85
- First baseman/Coach
- Born: June 29, 1970 (age 56); Yokohama, Kanagawa, Japan
- Batted: Right Threw: Right

NPB debut
- September 28, 1996, for the Chunichi Dragons

Last NPB appearance
- 27 September, 2007, for the Chunichi Dragons

NPB statistics (through 2007)
- Games Played: 859
- Batting average: .269
- Home runs: 11
- RBI: 123
- Stats at Baseball Reference

Teams
- As player: Chunichi Dragons (1996–2007); As Coach: Chunichi Dragons (2009–2018, 2020-present)

Career highlights and awards
- 1× Central League Golden Glove Award (2004)

Hiroyuki Watanabe (渡邉博幸, Watanabe Hiroyuki; born June 29, 1970) is a Japanese former professional baseball utility player. He played for the Chunichi Dragons.

He is currently the second team infield defense and baserunning for the Chunichi Dragons in Japan's Western League.

== Career ==
Watanabe was mostly used as a utility infielder for most of his career but captured a golden glove in 2004 as a regular. After Tyrone Woods was brought to the club, Watanabe's appearances became more limited to an off the bench role.

After retirement, Watanabe has worked with the Dragons backroom mostly as a defensive specialist where he was most prominent as 1st base coach under Motonobu Tanishige's reign as manager.

After Tanishige's sacking and the appointment of Shigekazu Mori as manager, Watanabe served as second team defensive coach before moving into a scorers role in 2018. Ahead of the 2020 season, Watanabe was brought back to the second team coaching staff by Tsuyoshi Yoda after the promotion of Masahiro Araki to the first team after the departure of Hiroshi Narahara to the Tohoku Rakuten Golden Eagles.
