= 2021 Chunichi Dragons season =

2021 Chunichi Dragons
- League: Central League
- Ballpark: Vantelin Dome Nagoya
- Record: 55-71-17 (.437)
- League place: 5th
- Parent company: Chunichi Shimbun
- Manager: Tsuyoshi Yoda

The 2021 Chunichi Dragons season was the 85th season of the franchise in Nippon Professional Baseball, also the 85th season in Nagoya, the 75th season under Chunichi Shimbun, and the 27th season in Nagoya Dome. This was also the third and final season under manager Tsuyoshi Yoda. He was replaced by Kazuyoshi Tatsunami for 2022.

== Regular season ==
The Dragons finished in 5th place, going 55-71-17, with a .437 winning percentage, 19 games back of the Tokyo Yakult Swallows.

2021 Central League standings
| Pos | Team | G | W | L | T | Pct. | GB | Home | Road |
|---|---|---|---|---|---|---|---|---|---|
| 1 | Tokyo Yakult Swallows | 143 | 73 | 52 | 18 | .584 | — | 36–29–7 | 37–23–11 |
| 2 | Hanshin Tigers | 143 | 77 | 56 | 10 | .579 | 1 | 36–31–4 | 41–25–6 |
| 3 | Yomiuri Giants | 143 | 61 | 62 | 20 | .496 | 11½ | 32–30–10 | 29–32–10 |
| 4 | Hiroshima Toyo Carp | 143 | 63 | 68 | 12 | .481 | 14 | 30–34–8 | 33–34–4 |
| 5 | Chunichi Dragons | 143 | 55 | 71 | 17 | .437 | 19 | 33–27–11 | 22–44–6 |
| 6 | Yokohama DeNA BayStars | 143 | 54 | 73 | 16 | .425 | 20½ | 27–37–7 | 27–36–9 |
