= 1953 Nippon Professional Baseball season =

1953 NPB season
- League: Nippon Professional Baseball
- Sport: Baseball

Central League pennant
- League champions: Yomiuri Giants
- Runners-up: Osaka Tigers
- Season MVP: Takumi Otomo (YOM)

Pacific League pennant
- League champions: Nankai Hawks
- Runners-up: Hankyu Braves
- Season MVP: Isami Okamoto (NAN)

Japan Series
- Champions: Yomiuri Giants
- Runners-up: Nankai Hawks
- Finals MVP: Tetsuharu Kawakami (YOM)

NPB seasons
- ← 1952 1954 →

The 1953 Nippon Professional Baseball season was the fourth season of operation of Nippon Professional Baseball (NPB).

That season would be the first to be televised on the young NHK General TV - which opened that year. The young channel and its then few national relay stations aired some games during the year, tying baseball to the young TV industry and thus beginning the sports connection to Japanese television, as well as its transformation into the top sport of the nation.

== Regular season ==
=== Standings ===
Central League regular season standings
| Team | G | W | L | T | Pct. | GB |
|---|---|---|---|---|---|---|
| Yomiuri Giants | 125 | 87 | 37 | 1 | .702 | — |
| Osaka Tigers | 130 | 74 | 56 | 0 | .569 | 16.0 |
| Chunichi Dragons | 130 | 70 | 57 | 3 | .551 | 18.5 |
| Hiroshima Carp | 130 | 53 | 75 | 2 | .414 | 36.0 |
| Taiyo Shochiku Robins | 130 | 52 | 77 | 1 | .403 | 37.5 |
| Kokutetsu Swallows | 125 | 45 | 79 | 1 | .363 | 42.0 |

Pacific League regular season standings
| Team | G | W | L | T | Pct. | GB |
|---|---|---|---|---|---|---|
| Nankai Hawks | 120 | 71 | 48 | 1 | .597 | — |
| Hankyu Braves | 120 | 67 | 52 | 1 | .563 | 4.0 |
| Daiei Stars | 120 | 63 | 53 | 4 | .543 | 6.5 |
| Nishitetsu Lions | 120 | 57 | 61 | 2 | .483 | 13.5 |
| Mainichi Orions | 120 | 56 | 62 | 2 | .475 | 14.5 |
| Tokyu Flyers | 120 | 50 | 67 | 3 | .427 | 20.0 |
| Kintetsu Pearls | 120 | 48 | 69 | 3 | .410 | 22.0 |

== Postseason ==
=== Japan Series ===
CL Yomiuri Giants (4) vs. PL Nankai Hawks (2)

| Game | Date | Score | Location | Time | Attendance |
|---|---|---|---|---|---|
| 1 | October 10 | Yomiuri Giants – 3, Nankai Hawks – 4 | Osaka Stadium | 3:15 | 24,913 |
| 2 | October 11 | Yomiuri Giants – 5, Nankai Hawks – 3 | Osaka Stadium | 2:33 | 30,524 |
| 3 | October 12 | Nankai Hawks – 2, Yomiuri Giants – 2 | Korakuen Stadium | 2:21 | 22,546 |
| 4 | October 13 | Nankai Hawks – 0, Yomiuri Giants – 3 | Korakuen Stadium | 1:45 | 25,953 |
| 5 | October 14 | Yomiuri Giants – 5, Nankai Hawks – 0 | Osaka Stadium | 2:04 | 21,652 |
| 6 | October 15 | Yomiuri Giants – 0, Nankai Hawks – 2 | Koshien Stadium | 1:55 | 6,346 |
| 7 | October 16 | Nankai Hawks – 2, Yomiuri Giants – 4 | Korakuen Stadium | 1:36 | 21,332 |

== League leaders ==
=== Central League ===
Batting leaders
| Stat | Player | Team | Total |
|---|---|---|---|
| Batting average | Tetsuharu Kawakami | Yomiuri Giants | .347 |
| Home runs | Fumio Fujimura | Osaka Tigers | 27 |
| Runs batted in | Fumio Fujimura | Osaka Tigers | 98 |
| Runs | Saburo Hirai | Yomiuri Giants | 97 |
| Hits | Tetsuharu Kawakami | Yomiuri Giants | 162 |
| Stolen bases | Jiro Kanayama | Hiroshima Carp | 58 |

Pitching leaders
| Stat | Player | Team | Total |
|---|---|---|---|
| Wins | Takumi Otomo | Yomiuri Giants | 27 |
| Losses | Yoshiaki Inoue | Kokutetsu Swallows | 26 |
| Earned run average | Takumi Otomo | Yomiuri Giants | 1.85 |
| Strikeouts | Masaichi Kaneda | Kokutetsu Swallows | 229 |
| Innings pitched | Masaichi Kaneda | Kokutetsu Swallows | 303 2/3 |

=== Pacific League ===
Batting leaders
| Stat | Player | Team | Total |
|---|---|---|---|
| Batting average | Isami Okamoto | Nankai Hawks | .318 |
| Home runs | Futoshi Nakanishi | Nishitetsu Lions | 36 |
| Runs batted in | Futoshi Nakanishi | Nishitetsu Lions | 86 |
| Runs | Futoshi Nakanishi; Larry Raines | Nishitetsu Lions; Hankyu Braves | 92 |
| Hits | Futoshi Nakanishi | Nishitetsu Lions | 146 |
| Stolen bases | Larry Raines | Hankyu Braves | 61 |

Pitching leaders
| Stat | Player | Team | Total |
|---|---|---|---|
| Wins | Tokuji Kawasaki | Nishitetsu Lions | 24 |
| Losses | Yasuo Yonekawa | Tokyu Flyers | 21 |
| Earned run average | Tokuji Kawasaki | Nishitetsu Lions | 1.98 |
| Strikeouts | Yasuo Yonekawa | Tokyu Flyers | 180 |
| Innings pitched | Tokuji Kawasaki | Nishitetsu Lions | 294 1/3 |

== Awards ==
- Most Valuable Player
  - Takumi Otomo, Yomiuri Giants (CL)
  - Isami Okamoto, Nankai Hawks (PL)
- Rookie of the Year
  - Masatoshi Gondo, Taiyo Shochiku Robins (CL)
  - Yasumitsu Toyoda, Nishitetsu Lions (PL)
- Eiji Sawamura Award
  - Takumi Otomo, Yomiuri Giants (CL)

Central League Best Nine Award winners
| Position | Player | Team |
|---|---|---|
| Pitcher | Takumi Otomo | Yomiuri Giants |
| Catcher | Jun Hirota | Yomiuri Giants |
| First baseman | Tetsuharu Kawakami | Yomiuri Giants |
| Second baseman | Shigeru Chiba | Yomiuri Giants |
| Third baseman | Larry Yogi | Osaka Tigers |
| Shortstop | Saburo Hirai | Yomiuri Giants |
| Outfielder | Masayasu Kaneda | Osaka Tigers |
| Outfielder | Wally Yonamine | Yomiuri Giants |
| Outfielder | Fukashi Minamimura | Yomiuri Giants |

Pacific League Best Nine Award winners
| Position | Player | Team |
|---|---|---|
| Pitcher | Tokuji Kawasaki | Nishitetsu Lions |
| Catcher | Jun Matsui | Nankai Hawks |
| First baseman | Tokuji Iida | Nankai Hawks |
| Second baseman | Isami Okamoto | Nankai Hawks |
| Third baseman | Futoshi Nakanishi | Nishitetsu Lions |
| Shortstop | Chusuke Kizuka | Nankai Hawks |
| Outfielder | Kaoru Betto | Mainichi Orions |
| Outfielder | Hazuo Horii | Nankai Hawks |
| Outfielder | Hiroshi Oshita | Tokyu Flyers |

== See also ==
- 1953 All-American Girls Professional Baseball League season
- 1953 Major League Baseball season
