= 1953 Japan Series =

Team (Wins)	Managers	Season
Yomiuri Giants (4)	Shigeru Mizuhara	87–37–1 (.702), 16 GA
Nankai Hawks (2)	Kazuto Tsuruoka	71–48–1 (.597), 4 GA
- Dates: October 10–16
- MVP: Tetsuharu Kawakami (Yomiuri)
- FSA: Hiroshi Minohara (Nankai)

The 1953 Japan Series was the Nippon Professional Baseball (NPB) championship series for the 1953 season. The fourth edition of the Series, it was a best-of-seven playoff that matched the Pacific League champion Nankai Hawks against the Central League champion Yomiuri Giants. It was the first Series to award the most impactful player on the losing team the Fighting Spirit Award, a tradition that still stands today.

== Summary ==
CL Yomiuri Giants (4) vs. PL Nankai Hawks (2)

Game	Date	Score	Location	Time	Attendance
1	October 10	Yomiuri Giants – 3, Nankai Hawks – 4	Osaka Stadium	3:15	24,913
2	October 11	Yomiuri Giants – 5, Nankai Hawks – 3	Osaka Stadium	2:33	30,524
3	October 12	Nankai Hawks – 2, Yomiuri Giants – 2	Korakuen Stadium	2:21	22,546
4	October 13	Nankai Hawks – 0, Yomiuri Giants – 3	Korakuen Stadium	1:45	25,953
5	October 14	Yomiuri Giants – 5, Nankai Hawks – 0	Osaka Stadium	2:04	21,652
6	October 15	Yomiuri Giants – 0, Nankai Hawks – 2	Koshien Stadium	1:55	6,346
7	October 16	Nankai Hawks – 2, Yomiuri Giants – 4	Korakuen Stadium	1:36	21,332

== Matchups ==
=== Game 1 ===
Saturday, October 10, 1953 – 2:05 pm at Osaka Stadium in Osaka, Osaka Prefecture

Team	1	2	3	4	5	6	7	8	9	10	11	12	R	H	E
Yomiuri	0	1	0	0	0	0	1	0	1	0	0	0	3	11	1
Nankai	2	0	0	0	0	1	0	0	0	0	0	1X	4	11	2
WP: Susumi Yuki (1–0) LP: Takehiko Bessho (0–1)

=== Game 2 ===
Sunday, October 11, 1953 – 2:05 pm at Osaka Stadium in Osaka, Osaka Prefecture

Team	1	2	3	4	5	6	7	8	9	R	H	E
Yomiuri	0	1	0	0	0	0	4	0	0	5	9	2
Nankai	0	0	0	0	1	1	0	1	0	3	10	0
WP: Hideo Fujimoto (1–0) LP: Taisei Nakamura (0–1); Home runs: YOM: Wally Yonamine (1), Shigeru Chiba (1), Yukō Minamimura (1); NAN: Tokuji Iida (1)

=== Game 3 ===
Monday, October 12, 1953 – 1:35 pm at Korakuen Stadium in Bunkyō, Tokyo

Team	1	2	3	4	5	6	7	8	R	H	E
Nankai	0	0	1	0	0	0	0	1	2	7	0
Yomiuri	1	0	0	0	1	0	0	0	2	7	0
Home runs: NAN: Hiroshi Nakahara (1); YOM: None

=== Game 4 ===
Tuesday, October 13, 1953 – 1:33 pm at Korakuen Stadium in Bunkyō, Tokyo

Team	1	2	3	4	5	6	7	8	9	R	H	E
Nankai	0	0	0	0	0	0	0	0	0	0	5	2
Yomiuri	0	1	0	0	2	0	0	0	X	3	5	0
WP: Takumi Ōtomo (1–0) LP: Nobuo Nakatani (0–1)

=== Game 5 ===
Wednesday, October 14, 1953 – 2:02 pm at Osaka Stadium in Osaka, Osaka Prefecture

Team	1	2	3	4	5	6	7	8	9	R	H	E
Yomiuri	1	0	0	1	0	0	0	2	1	5	11	0
Nankai	0	0	0	0	0	0	0	0	0	0	5	2
WP: Masanori Iritani (1–0) LP: Susumi Yuki (1–1); Home runs: YOM: Takashi Iwamoto (1); NAN: None

=== Game 6 ===
Thursday, October 15, 1953 – 2:00 pm at Koshien Stadium in Nishinomiya, Hyōgo Prefecture

Team	1	2	3	4	5	6	7	8	9	R	H	E
Yomiuri	0	0	0	0	0	0	0	0	0	0	9	3
Nankai	0	0	2	0	0	0	0	0	X	2	5	0
WP: Taketoshi Ōgami (1–0) LP: Hideo Fujimoto (1–1)

=== Game 7 ===
Friday, October 16, 1953 – 1:30 pm at Korakuen Stadium in Bunkyō, Tokyo

Team	1	2	3	4	5	6	7	8	9	R	H	E
Nankai	0	0	0	0	0	2	0	0	0	2	3	3
Yomiuri	1	0	0	0	0	0	3	0	X	4	8	0
WP: Takumi Ōtomo (2–0) LP: Taketoshi Ōgami (1–1); Home runs: NAN: Jun Matsui (1), Chūsuke Kiduka (1); YOM: None

== See also ==
- 1953 World Series
