= Amachi =

Amachi (written: 天知 or 天地) is a Japanese surname. Notable people with the surname include:

- Mari Amachi (天地 真理, born 1951), Japanese singer, songwriter and actress
- Mugihito Amachi (天地 麦人, born 1944), Japanese actor and voice actor
- Shigeru Amachi (天知 茂, 1931–1985), Japanese actor
- Shunichi Amachi (天知 俊一, 1903–1976), Japanese baseball manager
