= Takumi Otomo =

Japanese baseball player (1925–2013)

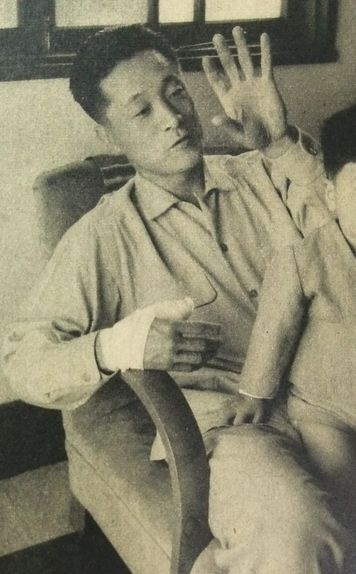
- Takumi c. 1956
- Pitcher
- Born: February 1, 1925; Hyogo Prefecture, Japan
- Died: April 12, 2013 (aged 88); Japan
- Batted: Right Threw: Right

JPCL debut
- 1950, for the Yomiuri Giants

Last JPPL appearance
- 1960, for the Kintetsu Buffalo

Career statistics
- Win–loss record: 130–57
- Earned run average: 2.11
- Strikeouts: 948

Teams
- Yomiuri Giants (1950–1958); Kintetsu Buffalo (1960)

Takumi Otomo (大友 工, Ōtomo Takumi; February 1, 1925 Hyogo Prefecture – April 12, 2013) was a Japanese professional baseball player.

Otomo's career lasted 10 seasons from 1950 to 1960. He was a pitcher for the Yomiuri Giants and the Kintetsu Buffalo. In 1954, he was the MVP of the Central League.
