= Takahiro Saeki =

Japanese baseball player and coach (born 1970)

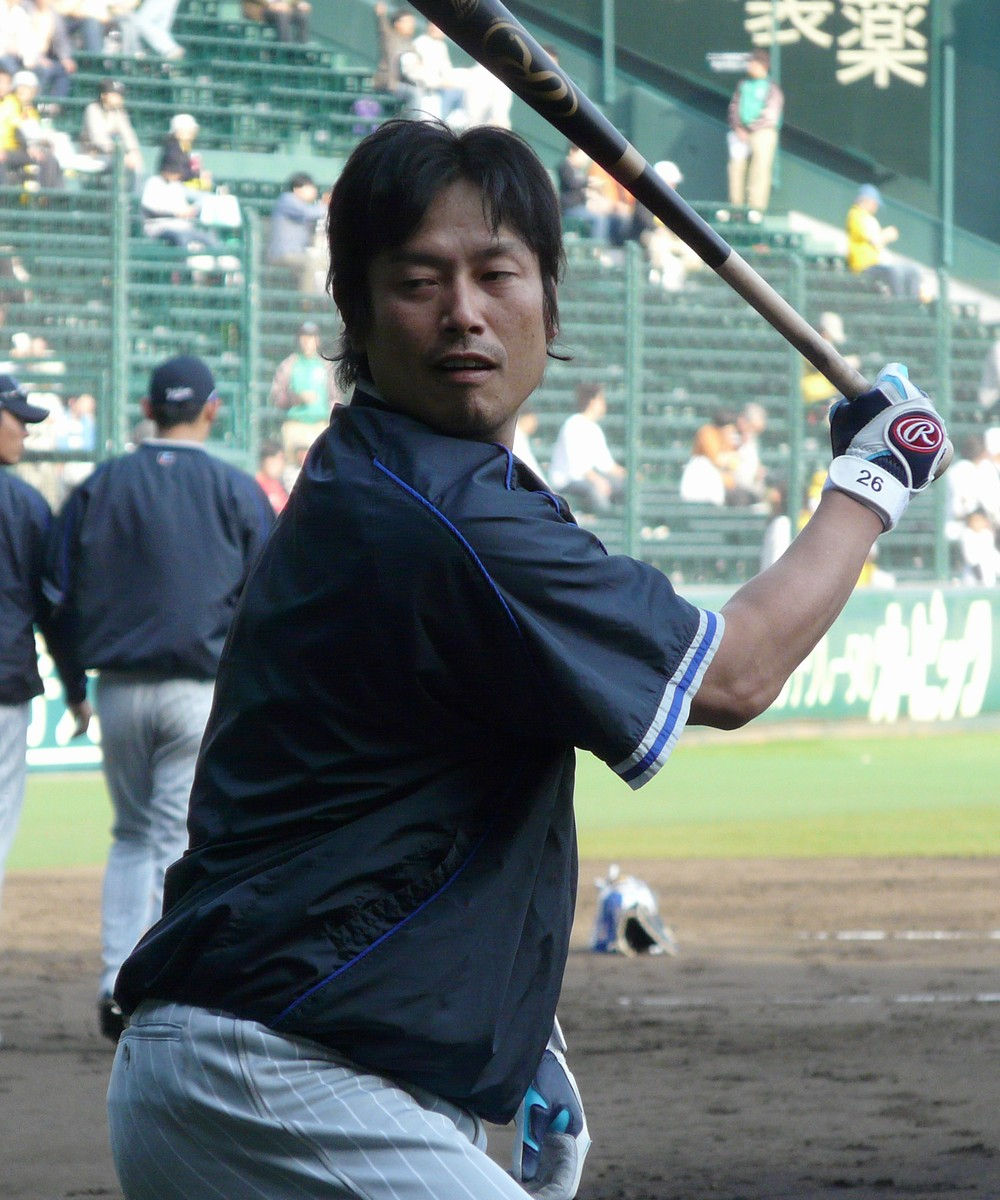
- Outfielder / First baseman / Coach
- Born: April 18, 1970 (age 55); Osaka, Osaka, Japan
- Batted: Left Threw: Left

NPB debut
- May 23, 1993, for the Yokohama BayStars

Last NPB appearance
- November 16, 2011, for the Chunichi Dragons

NPB statistics (through 2011)
- Batting average: .277
- Home runs: 156
- Hits: 1597

Teams
- As player: Yokohama BayStars (1993–2010); Chunichi Dragons (2011); As coach: Chunichi Dragons (2014–2016)

Career highlights and awards
- 3× NPB All-Star (1995, 1996, 2001); Japan Series champion (1998)

Takahiro Saeki (佐伯 貴弘, born April 18, 1970, in Osaka, Osaka, Japan) is a former Nippon Professional Baseball infielder.

Under former manager Motonobu Tanishige he was a fielding coach for the Chunichi Dragons, but with Tanishige's dismissal as manager on 10 August 2016, Saeki was also relieved from his position.
