= Misaki Sasahara =

Japanese baseball player (born 2004)

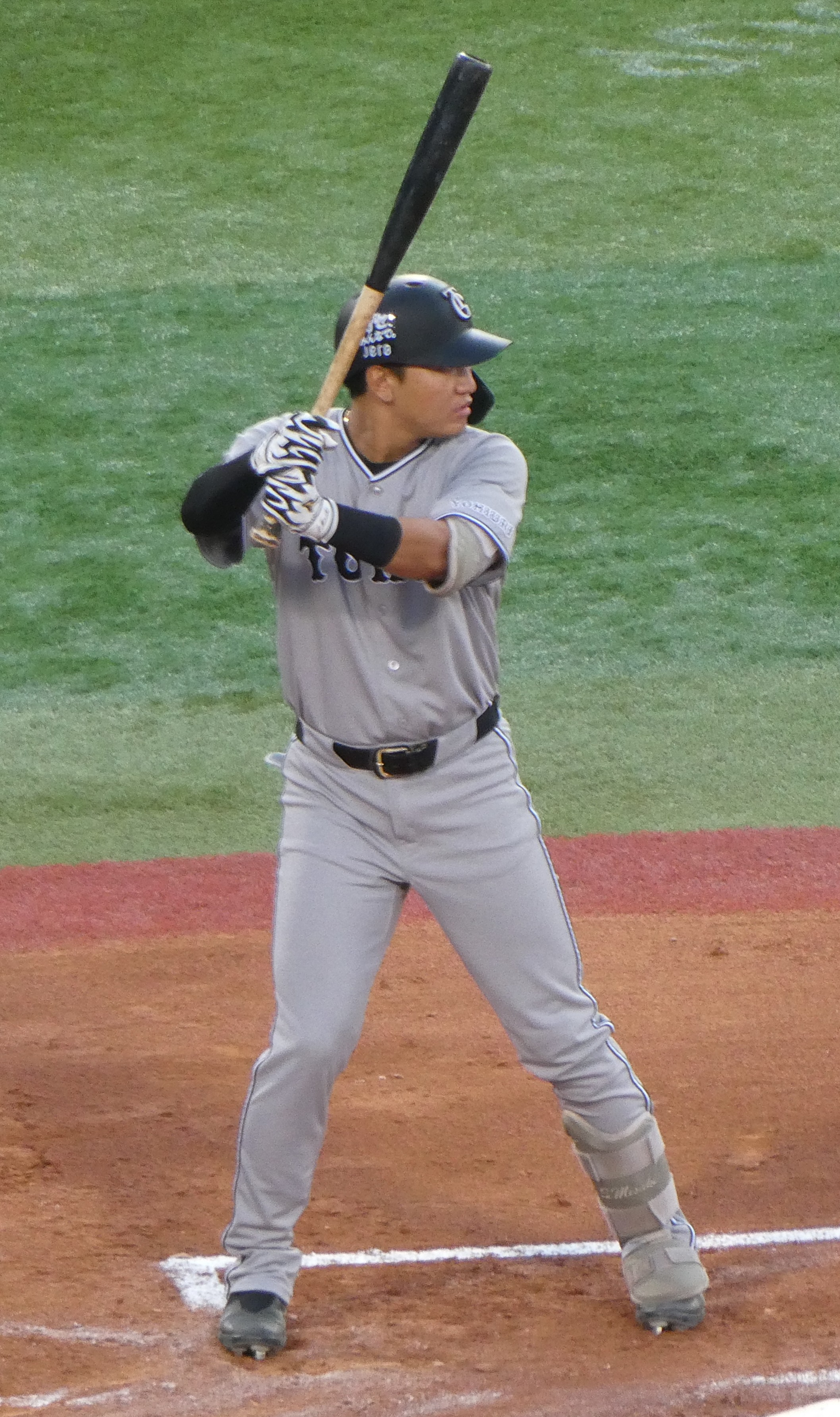
- Sasahara with the Yomiuri Giants

Yomiuri Giants – No. 95
- Infielder
- Born: February 9, 2004 (age 22); Nagano, Nagano, Japan
- Bats: Right Throws: Right

NPB debut
- April 16, 2025, for the Yomiuri Giants

NPB statistics (through 2025 season)
- Batting average: .100
- Home runs: 0
- RBI: 0
- Hits: 2
- Stolen base: 0
- Sacrifice bunt: 0

Teams
- Yomiuri Giants (2022–present)

Misaki Sasahara (笹原 操希, Sasahara Misaki; born February 9, 2004) is a professional Japanese baseball player. He plays outfielder for the Yomiuri Giants.
