= Balvino Gálvez =

Dominican baseball player (born 1964)

- Pitcher
- Born: March 31, 1964 (age 62); San Pedro de Macorís, Dominican Republic
- Batted: Right Threw: Right

Professional debut
- MLB: May 7, 1986, for the Los Angeles Dodgers
- CPBL: March 18, 1994, for the Brother Elephants
- NPB: April 10, 1996, for the Yomiuri Giants
- KBO: April 5, 2001, for the Samsung Lions

Last appearance
- MLB: October 5, 1986, for the Los Angeles Dodgers
- CPBL: August 24, 1995, for the Brother Elephants
- NPB: May 12, 2000, for the Yomiuri Giants
- KBO: 2001, for the Samsung Lions

MLB statistics
- Win–loss record: 0–1
- Earned run average: 3.92
- Strikeouts: 11

CPBL statistics
- Win–loss record: 26–16
- Earned run average: 2.53
- Strikeouts: 203

NPB statistics
- Win–loss record: 46–43
- Earned run average: 3.31
- Strikeouts: 443

KBO statistics
- Win–loss record: 10–4
- Earned run average: 2.47
- Strikeouts: 85
- Stats at Baseball Reference

Teams
- Los Angeles Dodgers (1986); Brother Elephants (1994–1995); Yomiuri Giants (1996–2000); Samsung Lions (2001)

Career highlights and awards
- Taiwan Series champion (1994)

Balvino Gálvez Jerez (born March 31, 1964) is a Dominican former Major League Baseball (MLB) pitcher in the 1980s to the early 2000s. Galvez who pitched part of one season for the Los Angeles Dodgers and numerous minor league affiliates then traveled to East Asia for five seasons for the Yomiuri Giants in the Nippon Professional Baseball League of Japanese baseball. He also played briefly for teams in South Korea and Taiwan.

== Professional career ==
Gálvez was signed by the Los Angeles Dodgers of the National League in 1981, and made his Major League (MLB) debut in 1986 with the Dodgers. He played in 10 major league games that year, but was demoted to the minors at the start of the 1987 season and never appeared in another MLB game. Over the next several years, Galvez also suited up for minor league affiliates teams of the Detroit Tigers, Minnesota Twins, New York Yankees of the American League, along with National League teams Montreal Expos and the Chicago Cubs in the 1980s and early 1990s.

In 1994, Galvez signed with the Brother Elephants of the national capital of Taipei in the Chinese Professional Baseball League on the island nation of Taiwan (with the Nationalist government of the Republic of China since 1949 after the Chinese Civil War). In two full seasons with the Elephants, he had a 26–16 record with an ERA of 2.53 and 203 strikeouts in 370 innings pitched.

He traveled to Japan in 1996 where baseball had a fevered fan base of followers since the early 20th century shared with the Americans who introduced the sport. Galvez was signed during spring training by the Yomiuri Giants, the most famous Japanese baseball team in the Nippon Professional Baseball League. He ended up with 16 wins, tying teammate Masaki Saito for the most wins in the Central League of the NPBL. The Giants won the Central League pennant that year, playing in the Japan Series of the championship tournament.

Gálvez displayed a distinct pitching form in Japan, often releasing the ball while sticking out his tongue. He had a mid-90 mph fastball and surprisingly good control. However, he was not comfortable when there were runners on base, and had trouble pitching from the set position. He also showed frequent dissatisfaction with ball and strike calls; a trait which would lead him into clashes with opposing teams and umpires.

On July 31, 1998, the Giants played against the Hanshin Tigers at Koshien Stadium, and Gálvez faced Tomochika Tsuboi, a heavy hitter in the bottom of the 6th inning. Galvez had a borderline pitch called a ball by the umpire, Atsushi Kittaka, and he subsequently lost his composure, giving up a home run to Tsuboi on the next pitch. Giants manager Shigeo Nagashima emerged from the dugout to change pitchers, but Gálvez refused to leave the mound, instead shouting insults at Kittaka. Gálvez allowed his teammates to drag him back towards the dugout, but then he turned back to throw the baseball at Kittaka (the ball narrowly missed him).

The game was a huge mess afterwards, with both teams involved in arguments and physical confrontations. The next game between the Tigers and Giants also erupted into a brawl, and both teams were warned for throwing dangerous pitches during the August 2nd contest. Galvez was given a season-ending suspension for throwing at the umpire.

The Giants could have released Gálvez for causing such an incident, but they chose to re-sign him for 1999 because the team's main starters, (Masaki Saito, Hiromi Makihara and Masumi Kuwata) were showing signs of aging. Gálvez actually ended up being the team's Opening Day starter, becoming the first non-Japanese player to pitch Opening Day for the Giants. He pitched decently throughout the season, but was given very little run support, resulting in a 9–12 record in 1999. He still figured as an important part of the Giants' starting rotation, though, and was kept for the following season.

Gálvez had stiff competition in 2000 for his spot on the top team roster during spring training, as the Giants had signed three other non-Japanese pitchers during the offseason. He earned his slot in the starting rotation, but lost all 6 of the games he started in 2000, despite giving up 3 runs or less each start. This made 10 consecutive losses, counting his four losses at the end of the previous year.

He was demoted to the Giants' farm team in the Japanese minors after his sixth loss and was released by the club at the end of the season. Although his temperamental ways, particularly the 1998 incident, tarnished his reputation in Japan, he still compiled a 46–43 record in his five seasons there.

He was signed by the Samsung Lions (Korea Baseball Organization) in Samsung, South Korea in 2001, and picked up a win in his first start. However, it was discovered that he had traveled to Korea without a working visa, and he was sued by the opposing team (Hanwha Eagles). However, after the visa situation was resolved, Galvez was a standout pitcher for the Samsung team, compiling a 10–4 record.

Before going to Korea to play with Samsung in 2001, Galvez had signed with the Pittsburgh Pirates of the National League back in the U.S.A. and pitched well enough in spring training to be in contention for the team's #5 starting pitcher spot. But a dispute with the Pirates' pitching coach on April 1 led to another temperamental outburst from Galvez and he quit the team.
