= Hideki Hashigami =

Japanese baseball player and coach (born 1965)

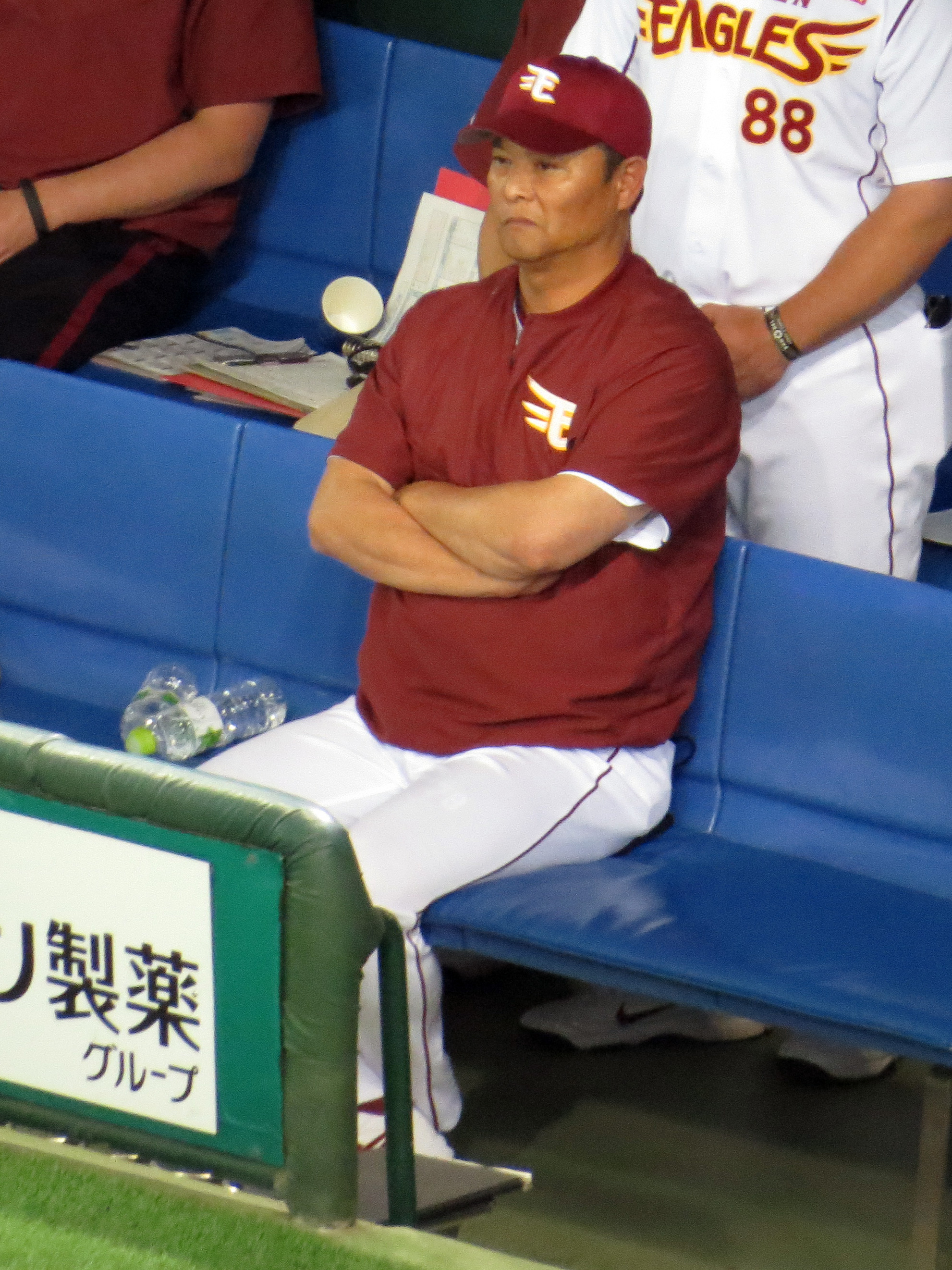
- Hashigami with the Tohoku Rakuten Golden Eagles

Yomiuri Giants – No. 75
- Acting Manager
- Born: November 4, 1965 (age 61); Funabashi, Chiba, Japan
- Batted: Right Threw: Right

NPB debut
- June 25, 1988, for the Yakult Swallows

Last NPB appearance
- October 2, 1999, for the Nippon-Ham Fighters

NPB statistics
- Batting average: .265
- Home runs: 17
- Hits: 215
- Stats at Baseball Reference

Teams
- As player: Yakult Swallows (1984–1996); Nippon-Ham Fighters (1997–1999); Hanshin Tigers (2000); As manager: Niigata Albirex Baseball Club (2011, 2021–2024); Yomiuri Giants (2026) (Note: Hashigami served as interim manager starting on May 26, 2026, following the arrest and subsequent resignation of manager Shinnosuke Abe.); As coach: Tohoku Rakuten Golden Eagles (2005–2009, 2015); Yomiuri Giants (2012–2014, 2025–2026); Saitama Seibu Lions (2016–2018); Tokyo Yakult Swallows (2019)

Career highlights and awards
- 2× Japan Series champion (1993, 1995)
- Last updated on: 31 December 2024

Hideki Hashigami (橋上 秀樹, born November 4, 1965) is a former Nippon Professional Baseball outfielder, offensive coach, and interim manager of the Yomiuri Giants. He played for the Tokyo Yakult Swallows.
