= Shigeru Chiba (baseball) =

Japanese baseball player and manager (1919–2002)

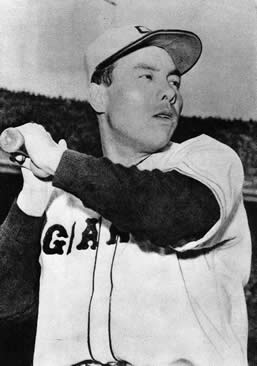
- Second baseman
- Born: 10 May 1919; Saijō, Ehime, Japan
- Died: 9 December 2002 (aged 83)
- Batted: Right Threw: Right

JBL debut
- 1938, for the Tokyo Kyojin

Last NPB appearance
- 1956, for the Yomiuri Giants

JBL/NPB statistics
- Batting average: .284
- Home runs: 96
- Runs batted in: 691

Teams
- As player: Tokyo Kyojin/Yomiuri Giants (1938–1941, 1946–1956); As Manager: Kintetsu Buffalo (1959–1961)

Member of the Japanese

Baseball Hall of Fame
- Induction: 1980

Shigeru Chiba (千葉 茂, Chiba Shigeru; 10 May 1919 – 9 December 2002) was a Japanese baseball second baseman who played with the Tokyo Kyojin/Yomiuri Giants from 1938 to 1941, and again from 1946 to 1956. He later managed the Kintetsu Buffalo from 1959 to 1961, and was elected to the Japanese Baseball Hall of Fame in 1980.
