= Shunichi Amachi =

Japanese baseball manager (1903–1976)

Shunichi Amachi 天知 俊
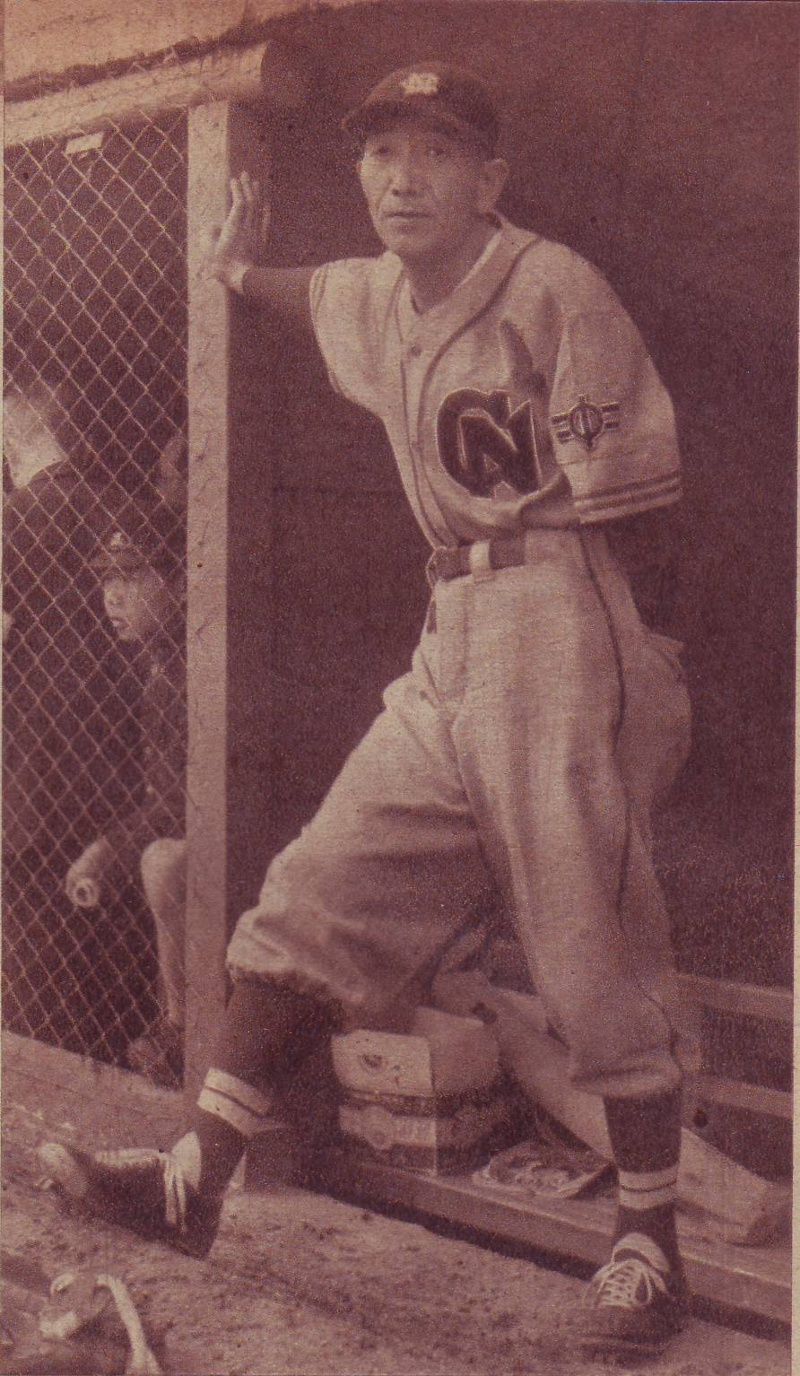
- Shun'ichi Amachi in 1950
- Born: December 20, 1903; Nishinomiya, Japan
- Died: March 12, 1976 (aged 72)
- Stats at Baseball Reference

Managerial statistics (through 1958)
- Wins: 439
- Losses: 316

Teams
- As manager: Chunichi Dragons (1949-1950); Nishitetsu Lions (1951); Chunichi Dragons (1954); Chunichi Dragons (1957-1958)

Career highlights and awards
- Japan Series champion (1954)

Member of the Japanese

Baseball Hall of Fame
- Induction: 1970
- Election method: Sportswriters Committee

Shunichi Amachi (天知 俊一, Amachi Shunichi) (December 20, 1903 in Nishinomiya – March 12, 1976) was a Japanese baseball manager with the Chunichi Dragons and Nishitetsu Lions. He was inducted as a member of the Japanese Baseball Hall of Fame in 1970.
