= Shigekazu Mori =

Japanese baseball player and coach

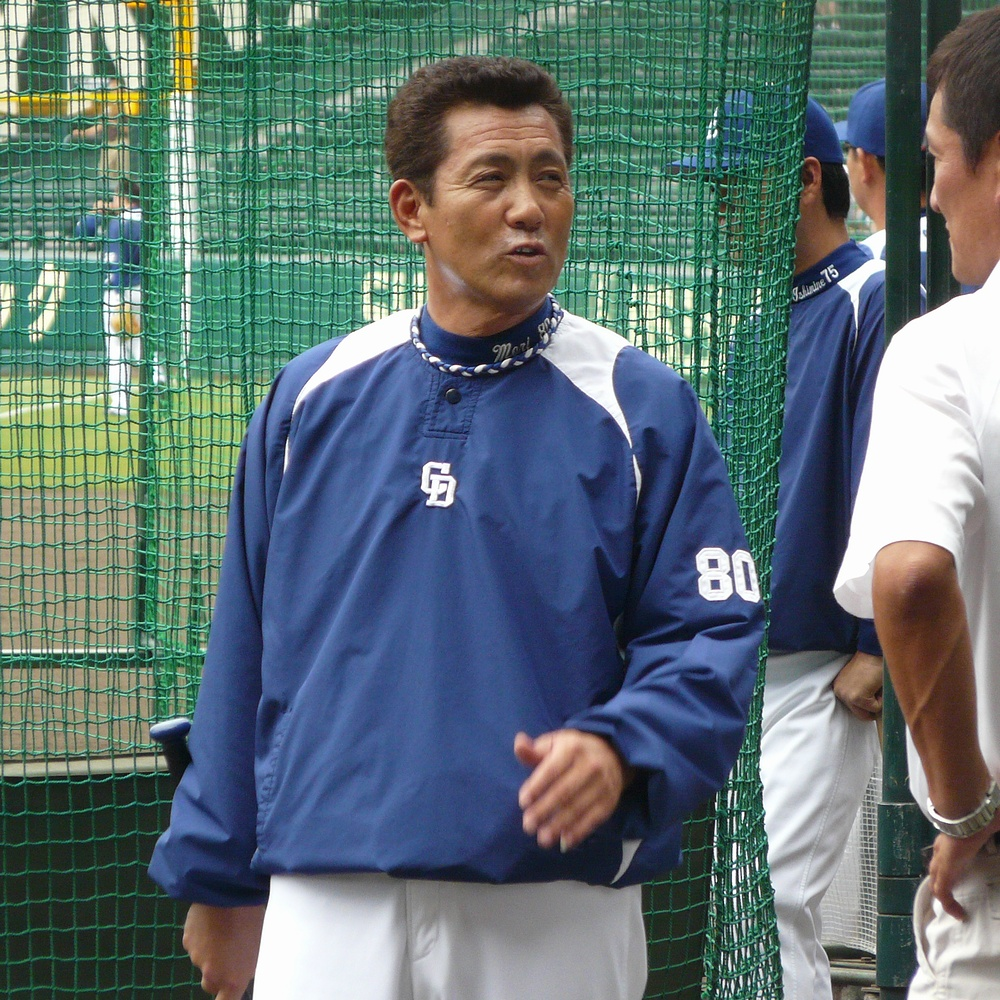
- Manager
- Born: November 18, 1954 (age 71)
- Bats: Right Throws: Right

NPB debut
- 9 April, 1979, for the Seibu Lions

NPB statistics (through 1988)
- Win–loss record: 57–62
- ERA: 3.73
- Strikeouts: 455
- Saves: 82
- Stats at Baseball Reference

Teams
- As player: Seibu Lions (1979– 1988); As coach: Seibu Lions (1989–1999); Nippon Ham Fighters (2000–2001); Yokohama BayStars (2002–2003); Chunichi Dragons (2004–2011, 2014–2016); As manager: Chunichi Dragons (2016–2018)

Career highlights and awards
- 1x Fireman Award (most saves) (1983); 1x NPB All-Star selection (1981), (1983)

Shigekazu Mori (森 繁和, born November 18, 1954, in Chosei, Chiba Prefecture) is a former Japanese professional baseball pitcher who played for the Seibu Lions in Japan's Nippon Professional Baseball.

He has held coaching positions at 4 different teams most notably including a 10 years stint at the Seibu Lions and 10 years at current employers, the Chunichi Dragons.

On 9 August 2016 it was announced that Mori would become the interim manager of the Dragons following the dismissal of Motonobu Tanishige.

On 29 September 2016, following the end of the 2016 NPB season where the Dragons finished last in the Central League, Mori was announced as permanent full-time manager for the 2017 season.
