= Yomiuri Giants =

Professional baseball team

- 読売ジャイアンツ・巨人

Logo	Cap insignia

Information
- League: Nippon Professional Baseball Central League (1950–present) Japanese Baseball League (1936–1949) Independent (1934–1935)
- Location: Bunkyō, Tokyo, Japan
- Ballpark: Tokyo Dome
- Founded: December 26, 1934; 91 years ago
- Nickname(s): Kyojin (巨人, 'Giants')
- Japan Series championships: 22 (1951, 1952, 1953, 1955, 1961, 1963, 1965, 1966, 1967, 1968, 1969, 1970, 1971, 1972, 1973, 1981, 1989, 1994, 2000, 2002, 2009, 2012)
- JBL championships: 9 (1936 Fall, 1937 Spring, 1938 Fall, 1939, 1940, 1941, 1942, 1943, 1949)
- CL pennants: 39 (1951, 1952, 1953, 1955, 1956, 1957, 1958, 1959, 1961, 1963, 1965, 1966, 1967, 1968, 1969, 1970, 1971, 1972, 1973, 1976, 1977, 1981, 1983, 1987, 1989, 1990, 1994, 1996, 2000, 2002, 2007, 2008, 2009, 2012, 2013, 2014, 2019, 2020, 2024)
- Playoff berths: 16 (2007, 2008, 2009, 2010, 2011, 2012, 2013, 2014, 2015, 2016, 2018, 2019, 2021, 2024, 2025, 2026)
- Former name: Tokyo Kyojin (1941–1946); Tokyo Giants (1935–1940); Great Japan Tokyo Baseball Club (1934)
- Former ballpark: Korakuen Stadium (1937–1987)
- Colors: Orange, Black, White
- Mascot: Giabbit
- Retired numbers: 1; 3; 4; 14; 16; 34
- Ownership: Legally as KK Yomiuri Kyojingun (株式会社読売巨人軍) 100% owned by The Yomiuri Shimbun Holdings
- Management: Toshikazu Yamaguchi
- Manager: Hideki Matsui
- Website: https://www.giants.jp/

Current uniforms

The Yomiuri Giants (読売ジャイアンツ, Yomiuri Jaiantsu; formally Yomiuri Kyojingun (読売巨人軍)) and still known by the nickname Kyojin (巨人) are a Japanese professional baseball team competing in Nippon Professional Baseball's Central League. Based in Bunkyō, Tokyo, they are one of two professional baseball teams based in Tokyo, the other being the Tokyo Yakult Swallows. They have played their home games at Tokyo Dome since its opening in 1988. The team's owner is The Yomiuri Shimbun Holdings, Japan's largest media conglomerate which also owns two newspapers (including the eponymous Yomiuri Shimbun) and the Nippon Television Network (which includes flagship Nippon TV).

The Giants are the oldest professional sports team in Japan. They are also by far the most successful, having won 22 Japan Series titles and an additional nine in the era of NPB's forerunner, the Japanese Baseball League. Their main rivalry is with the Hanshin Tigers, a team especially popular in the Kansai region. The Yomiuri Giants are regarded as "The New York Yankees of Japan" due to their widespread popularity, past dominance of the league, and polarizing effect on fans. Most Japanese baseball fans who are indifferent about teams other than their local team often have an intense dislike for the Giants; on the other hand, the Giants have a large fan base even in cities that have a team of their own.

The English-language press occasionally calls the team the Tokyo Giants, but that name has not been in use in Japan for decades. (Lefty O'Doul, a former Major League Baseball player, named the team "Tokyo Giants" in the mid-1930s.) Instead, the team is officially known by the name of its corporate owner, just like the Hanshin Tigers and Orix Buffaloes. The team is often referred by fans and in news headlines and tables simply as Kyojin (巨人; the Japanese word for 'giant(s)'), instead of the usual corporate owner's name or the English nickname.

The Yomiuri Giants name and uniforms were based on the New York (now San Francisco) Giants. The team's colors (orange and black) are the same colors worn by the National League's Giants (both then as now in both New York and San Francisco). The stylized lettering on the team's jerseys and caps is similar to the fancy lettering used by the Giants when they played in New York in the 1930s, although during the 1970s the Yomiuri Giants modernized their lettering to follow the style worn by the San Francisco Giants.

Through 2026, the franchise's all-time record is 6,489–4,732–372 (.578). The team's acting manager is Hideki Hashigami.

== Franchise history ==
=== Great Japan Tokyo Baseball Club ===
The team began in 1934 as The Great Japan Tokyo Baseball Club (大日本東京野球倶楽部, Dai-Nippon Tōkyō Yakyū Kurabu), a team of all-stars organized by media mogul Matsutarō Shōriki that toured the United States and matched up against an American all-star team that included Babe Ruth, Jimmie Foxx, Lou Gehrig, and Charlie Gehringer. While prior Japanese all-star contingents had disbanded, Shōriki went pro with this group, playing in an independent league.

In 1935, the team traveled to the United States and faced off against college and minor league teams, ultimately playing 109 games in 128 days (including 34 games on 17 days as doubleheaders) across the country. The tour ended with a record of 75 wins, 33 losses, and 1 draw.

When they faced off against the San Francisco Seals, the manager of the Seals, Lefty O'Doul, stated the team needed a promotional name, as just the team being named "Tokyo Dai Nippon Baseball Club" wouldn't mean anything of note to Americans, and because the tour was heavily funded with ticket sales. He suggested that since Tokyo was the New York of Japan, they should emulate one of the two named MLB teams in New York; either the Yankees or the Giants (New York's first professional baseball team and at that point the more successful team). As "Yankees" was immediately out of the question, due to it being a uniquely American name, O'Doul suggested the name "Giants", also thanks to the fact that coincidentally, O'Doul was formerly of the Giants himself, and the team adopted the Tokyo Giants moniker mid-tour.

However, the Giants name would face minor challenging from Shōriki himself after the tour, as he wanted to name the team the Tokyo Golden Kites, after the Order of the Golden Kite, a military order of the Empire of Japan (which would be abolished in 1947 following World War II). The players, however, would hold firm, and Shōriki would retain the Giants name.

=== Tokyo Kyojin ===
In 1936, with the formation of the Japanese Baseball League, the team changed its name to the Tokyo Kyojin, often called the Tokyo Giants in non-Japanese sources. It won eight league championships under that name from 1936 to 1943, including six championships in a row from 1938 to 1943.

Russian-born pitcher Victor Starffin, nicknamed "the blue-eyed Japanese", starred for the team until 1944. One of the league's premier pitchers, he won two MVP awards and a Best Nine award, and won at least 26 games in six different years, winning a league-record 42 games in 1939. He followed his record-setting performance with another 38 wins in 1940. Pitcher Eiji Sawamura co-starred with Starffin on the Kyojin. He pitched the first no-hitter in Japanese pro baseball, on September 25, 1936, as well as two others. In 1937, he went 33–10 with a 1.38 earned run average. From 1937 to 1943 Sawamura had a record of 63–22, 554 strikeouts, and a 1.74 ERA. Sawamura was conscripted into the Japanese Imperial Army in 1938, 1941, and 1943; he returned to play for the Giants between deployments, though injuries and time away hindered his form and velocity. He was released by the team in 1943, then killed in battle when his ship was torpedoed near the end of the Second World War.

Outfielder Haruyasu Nakajima was a featured hitter during the franchise's first decade-and-a-half, and as player-manager led the Kyojin to a championship in 1941. Tetsuharu Kawakami was a team fixture from 1938 to 1958, winning the batting title five times, two home run crowns, three RBI titles, and had six titles for the most hits in a season. He was the first player in Japanese pro baseball to achieve 2,000 hits and was named the league's MVP three times. Leadoff man Shosei Go starred for the team from 1937 to 1943, winning league MVP in 1943. Only 5 ft 6 in (1.68 m) and 140 lb (64 kg), he was nicknamed "The Human Locomotive" due to his speed.

Pitcher Hideo Fujimoto (also known as Hideo Nakagami) pitched for the team for 12 seasons from 1942 to 1955. He holds the Japanese records for lowest career ERA (1.90) and seasonal ERA (0.73 in 1943), as well as best all-time winning percentage (.697). He threw two career no-hitters, including the first perfect game in Japanese professional baseball. In addition, he served as the Giants' player-manager in 1944 (there was no 1945 season) and part of 1946.

=== Yomiuri Giants ===
In 1947 the team became the Yomiuri Giants, winning the final JBL championship in 1949 (again under player-manager Haruyasu Nakajima). From 1938 to 1987 the Giants played at Korakuen Stadium, moving to their current home the Tokyo Dome in 1988.

In 1950, the Giants were one of the founding members of Nippon Professional Baseball, joining the Central League.

Slugger Noboru Aota starred for the Giants from 1948 to 1952, winning the home run championship twice, and hitting a home run in the 1951 Japan Series, when the Giants defeated the Nankai Hawks 4 games to 2 for their first NPB championship. The Giants would also win Japan Series championships in 1952, 1953, and 1955, all over the Nankai Hawks. The team was the Central League champion every year from 1955 to 1959, winning the Japan Series championship in 1955, but they lost four consecutive Japan Series thereafter, with the first three losses coming against the Nishitetsu Lions, and then the Hawks finally got their revenge to close out the decade.

World career home run record holder Sadaharu Oh starred for the Giants from 1959 to 1980, and fellow Hall of Famer Shigeo Nagashima played for the team from 1958 to 1974. The Giants lineup, consisting of Oh batting third and Nagashima batting fourth, was nicknamed the ON Hou, ("Oh-Nagashima Cannon") as the two players emerged as the best hitters in the league. Now the team's manager, Tetsuharu Kawakami led the Giants to nine consecutive Japan Series championships from 1965 to 1973, and Oh and Nagashima dominated the batting titles during this period. During his career, Oh was a five-time batting champion and fifteen-time home-run champion, and won the Central League most valuable player award nine times. Nagashima won the season MVP award five times, and the Best Nine Award every single year of his career (a total 17 times). Future Hall of Famer Tsuneo Horiuchi pitched for the team during its heyday, from 1966 to 1983. The renowned left-hander Masaichi Kaneda pitched for the team from 1965 to 1969, later having his number retired by the Giants.

Shigeo Nagashima was appointed manager of the Giants almost immediately after his retirement in 1974, staying in that position until 1980. After a couple of down years the Giants re-assumed their dominant position in the Central League, winning league championships in 1976 and 1977. Sadaharu Oh rejoined the team as manager from 1984 to 1988. Nagashima returned as Giants manager from 1993 to 2001, winning Japan Series championships in 1994, 1996, and 2000.

Outfielder Hideki Matsui starred for the Giants for ten seasons in the 1990s and early 2000s before migrating to Major League Baseball. He was a three-time NPB MVP, leading his team to four Japan Series, winning three titles (1994, 2000, and 2002), and earning the popular nickname "Godzilla". He also made nine consecutive All-Star Games and led the league in home runs and RBIs three times.

Matsui would go on to play for the New York Yankees & he would lead them to a World Series championship in 2009, where he was named Series MVP. 3 days later, his old Giants team would win their 21st Japan Series title in 6 games over the Hokkaido Nippon-Ham Fighters. The 2 teams would meet again in 2012, with Yomiuri winning the rematch again in 6 games. They have continue to make the Postseason on a regular basis & have made the Japan Series 3 times since their last championship. They would lose all 3 times to the Tohoku Rakuten Golden Eagles in 2013 & the Fukuoka SoftBank Hawks in both 2019 & 2020.

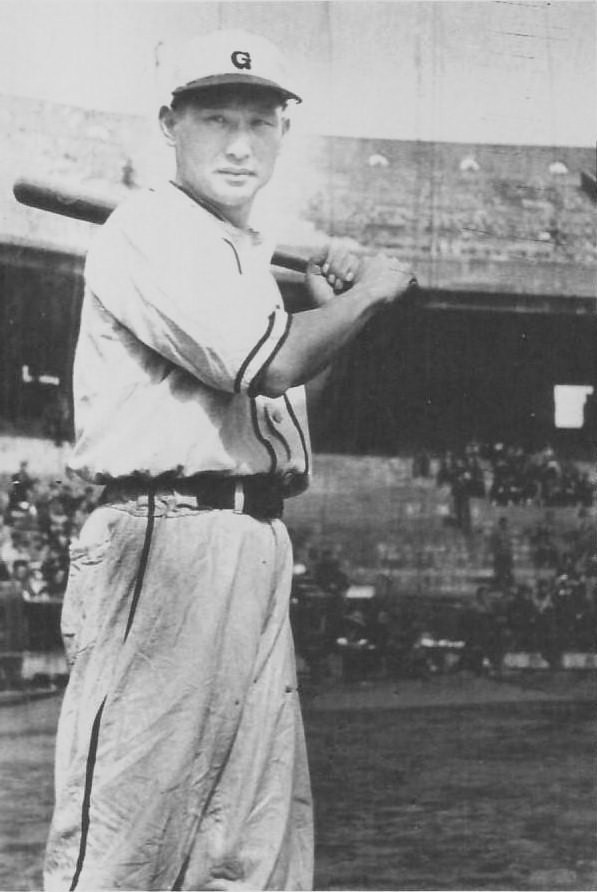
Tetsuharu Kawakami in 1946

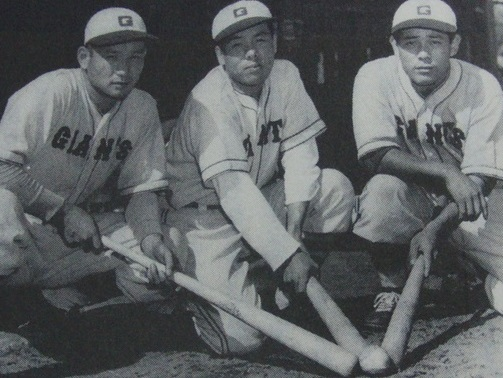
Three Giants stars of the 1950s, Tetsuharu Kawakami, Shigeru Chiba (baseball), and Noboru Aota (left to right)

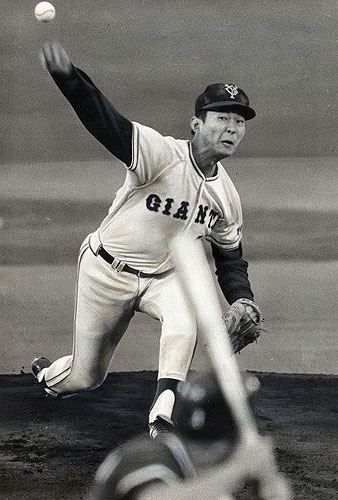
Suguru Egawa, after 1981

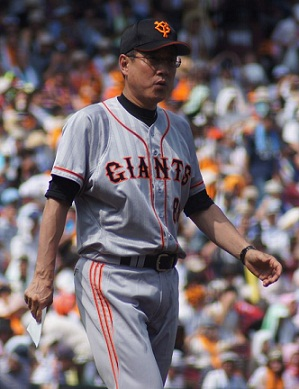
Tatsunori Hara in 2012

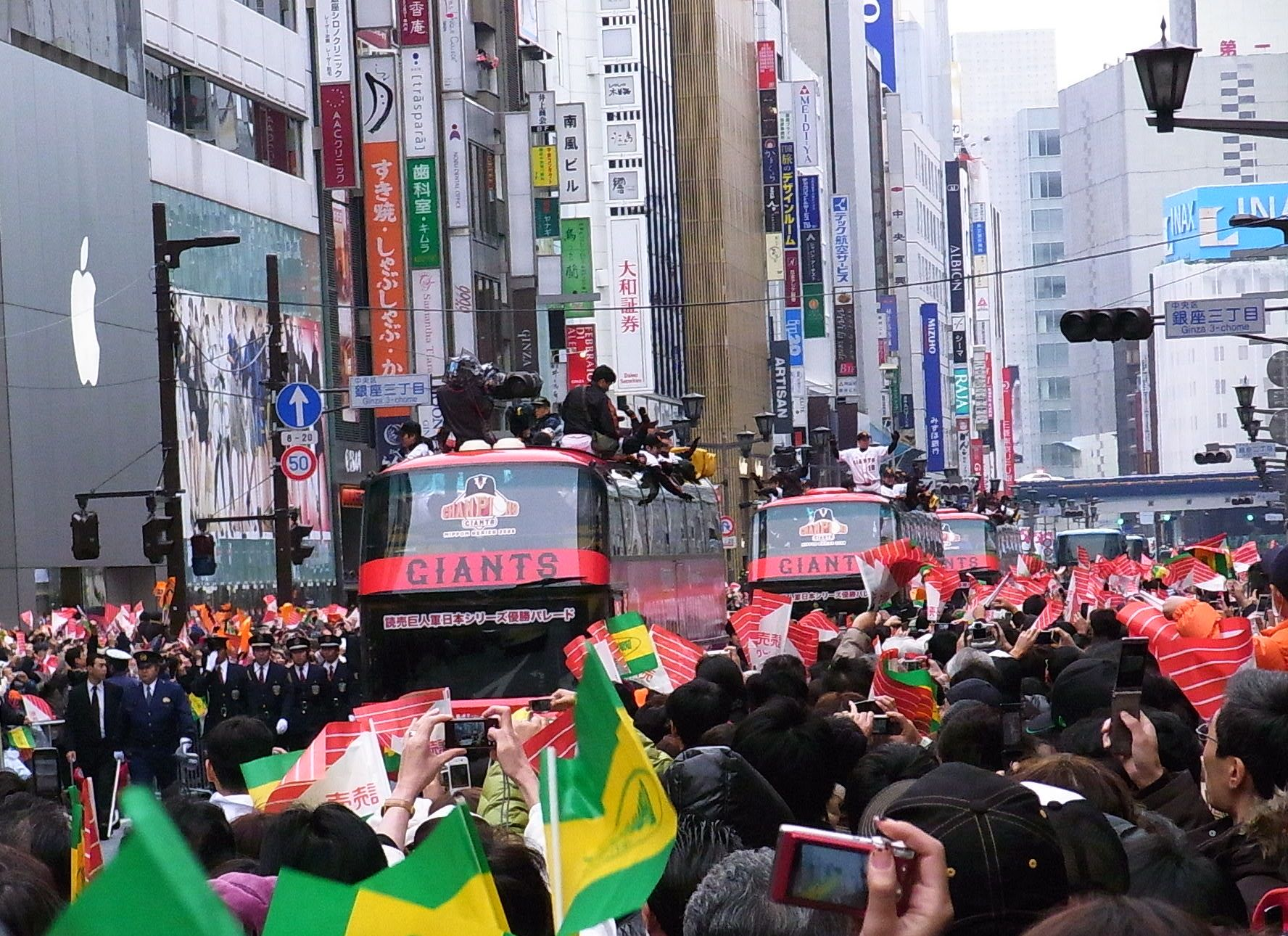
A celebration with Giants supporters for NPB championship parade in November 2009

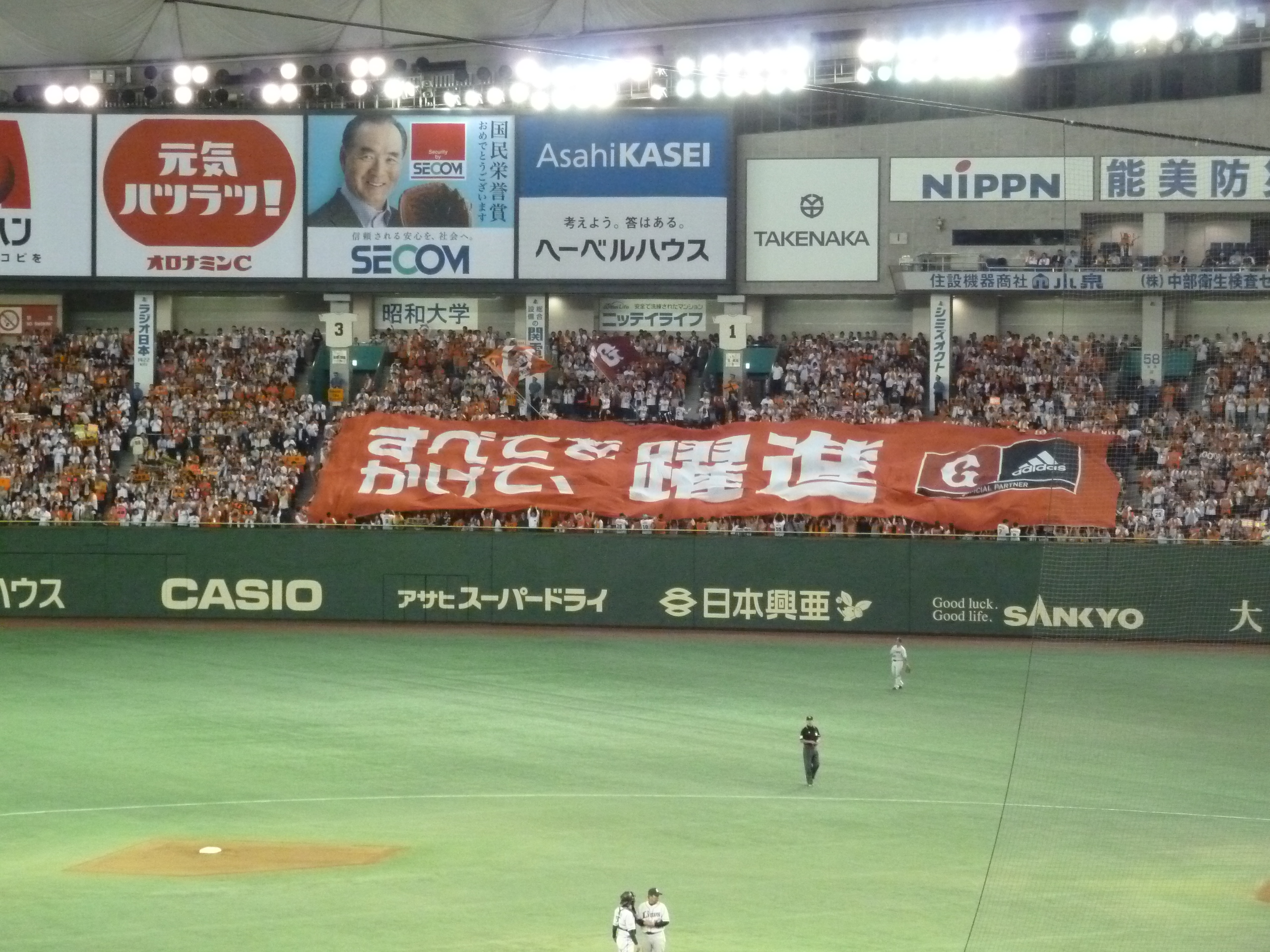
A celebration for awarding the National Honor Award served to Shigeo Nagashima, former stars and manager for long period, in Tokyo Dome, May 2013.

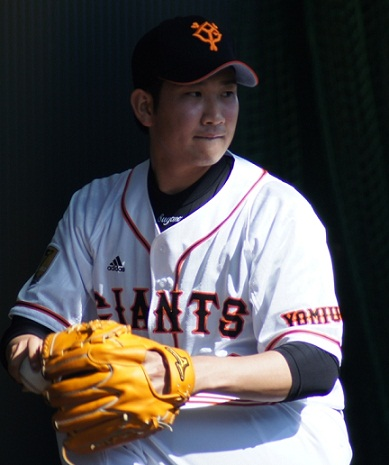
A main Giants pitcher, Tomoyuki Sugano

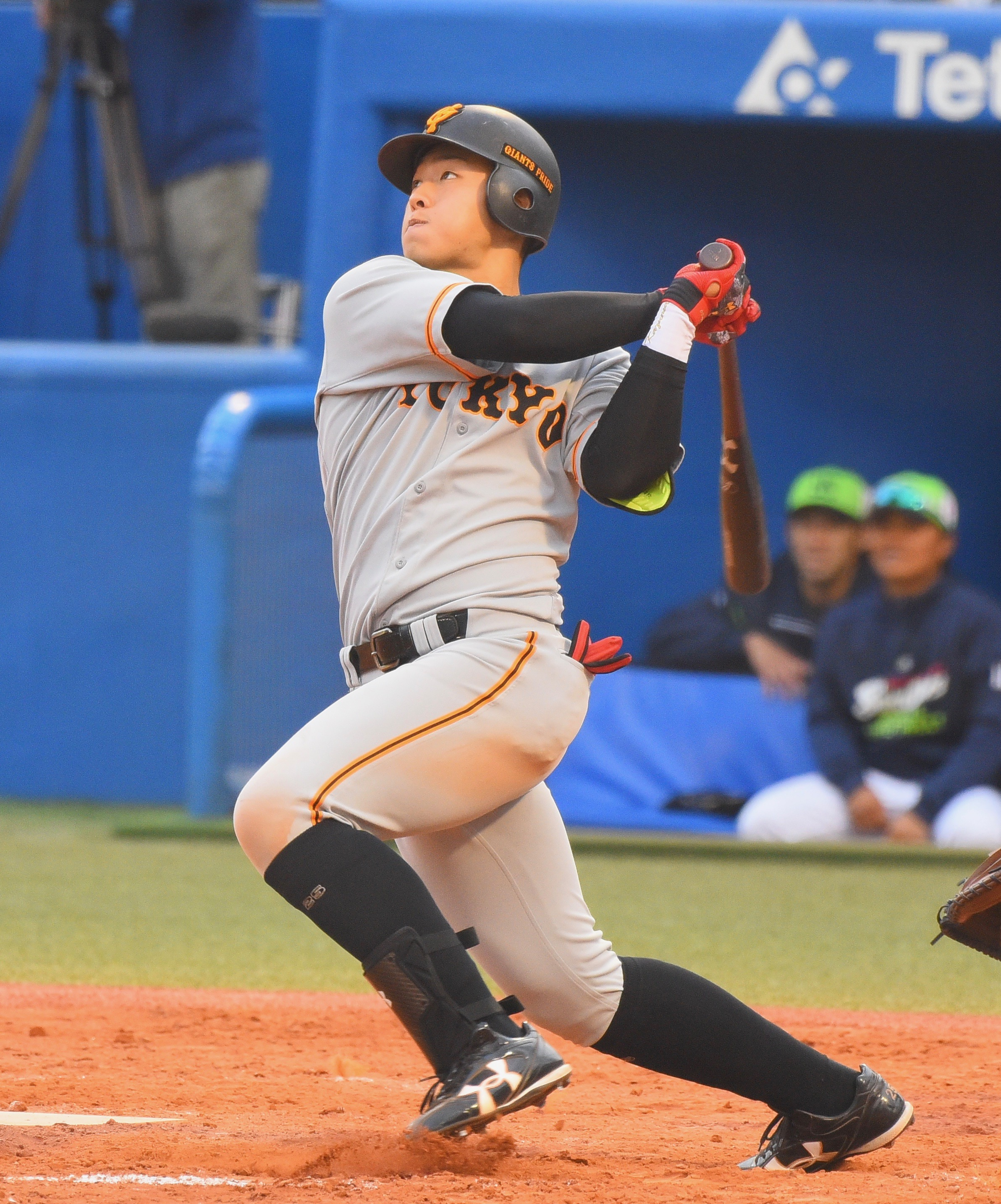
Main Giants player, Kazuma Okamoto

== Managerial history and lifetime records ==
Name	Tenure	Games	W	L	T	Win %
Sadayoshi Fujimoto (Japan)	1936–1942	604	422	168	14	.715
Haruyasu Nakajima (Japan)	1943	84	54	27	3	.667
Hideo Fujimoto (Japan)	1944	35	19	14	2	.576
Hideo Fujimoto (2) (Japan)	1946	25	15	9	1	.625
Haruyasu Nakajima (2) (Japan)	1946–1947	171	96	74	1	.564
Osamu Mihara (Japan)	1947–1949	302	177	118	7	.600
Shigeru Mizuhara (Japan)	1950–1960	1,407	881	497	29	.639
Tetsuharu Kawakami (Japan)	1961–1974	1,868	1,066	741	61	.590
Shigeo Nagashima (Japan)	1975–1980	780	387	386	55	.533
Motoshi Fujita (Japan)	1981–1983	390	211	148	31	.588
Sadaharu Oh (Taiwan)	1984–1988	650	347	264	39	.568
Motoshi Fujita (2) (Japan)	1989–1992	520	305	213	2	.587
Shigeo Nagashima (2) (Japan)	1993–2001	1,202	647	551	4	.538
Tatsunori Hara (Japan)	2002–2003	280	147	138	5	.535
Tsuneo Horiuchi (Japan)	2004–2005	284	133	144	7	.480
Tatsunori Hara (2) (Japan)	2006–2015	1,441	795	595	51	.572
Yoshinobu Takahashi (Japan)	2016–2018	429	210	208	11	.502
Tatsunori Hara (3) (Japan)	2019–2023	657	344	313	35	.524
Shinnosuke Abe (Japan)	2024–2026	332	171	150	11	.532
Hideki Hashigami (Japan) (interim)	2026	84	46	37	1	.554

== Rivalries ==
The Giants have several rivalries with clubs in the Central League, most notably rivalries with the Nishinomiya-based Hanshin Tigers, the Nagoya-based Chunichi Dragons and their cross-town rivals, the Tokyo Yakult Swallows.

=== Hanshin Tigers ===
The Giants-Tigers rivalry is considered the most intense professional rivalry in the history of Japanese team sports.

The Giants-Tigers feud began on July 15, 1936 in Nagoya, Aichi, Japan, at a time when Japanese clubs besides the Tigers did not have set home ballparks, and would bounce around wherever they could play. This game would set the tone for the history-setting rivalry, as the first home run in Giants professional club history would come on that day at the hands of Japanese Baseball Hall of Fame member Haruyasu Nakajima off Tigers' ace Tadashi Wakabayashi, but the Tigers would win the game 8-7. On September 25, 1936, young Giants ace Eiji Sawamura threw the first no-hitter in Japanese professional baseball history against the Tigers at Hanshin Koshien Stadium. He would be the only Giants pitcher to throw a no-hitter at Koshien until Shosei Togo did it on May 24, 2024.

The Giants-Tigers rivalry has seen mostly the Giants enjoy long standing periods of success at the expense of the Tigers. From 1956 to 1959, the Giants won the Central League pennant over the Tigers in each of the four seasons; however, the Giants would lose all 4 of their Japan Series appearances during that time, three times to the Nishitetsu Lions (now the Saitama Seibu Lions) from 1956 to 1958, and once to the Nankai Hawks (now the Fukuoka SoftBank Hawks) in 1959. Most notably during this time, the only ever baseball Tenran-jiai, or "Match viewed by the Emperor" happened on June 25th, 1959, where Emperor Hirohito decided to watch the game between the Tigers and Giants; Giants legend Shigeo Nagashima would walk off future Tigers legend Minoru Murayama in the bottom of the 9th as the Giants won 5-4. During the Giants' V9 dynasty, where the Giants would win a record setting 9 consecutive Japan Series championships from 1965 to 1973, the Tigers would finish 2nd in the Central League 5 of the 9 seasons, including 3 consecutive second place finishes from 1968 to 1970.

As of the end of the 2024 season, the Giants have the edge in Japan Series championships, 22–2, Central League pennants, 39–6, overall championships, 31–6, and the Giants lead the Tigers head to head, 1127–888–77. The Giants and Tigers have met in the Climax Series 5 times, in which the Giants lead the overall head-to-head matchup 11-6-0, winning the series 4 times to the Tigers' 1.

=== Tokyo Yakult Swallows ===
The geographic rivalry between the Giants and the Shinjuku-based Tokyo Yakult Swallows has been around since the Swallows were founded by the former Japanese National Railways (known as Kokutetsu (国鉄) in Japanese)) as the Kokutetsu Swallows on January 12, 1950. However, the rivalry never truly began in earnest until Yakult, which bought the team from national newspaper Sankei Shimbun in 1970, added "Tokyo" to the team's name in the 2005-06 NPB offseason, where games began being referred to by the media as the "TOKYOシリーズ", or literally "Tokyo Series" in Japanese. In 2015, the Swallows and Giants officially announced plans for an annual "Tokyo Series" event with each team hosting a series. At the same time, the Swallows began producing annual alternate uniforms for said rivalry games.

Since Yakult added Tokyo to the Swallows name in 2006, the Giants lead the head-to-head regular season series 260–184–19. Overall, since the Swallows were founded in 1950, the Giants lead the head-to-head regular season series 1094–758–61. The Swallows and Giants have met in the Climax Series 4 times, in which Yakult lead the head-to-head matchups 9–4–1 (including Yakult's 1 advantage win in the 2015 and 2021 Central League Climax Series), winning the series 3 times to the Giants' 1 series win.

=== Chunichi Dragons ===
The Giants-Dragons rivalry is said to be the oldest professional rivalry in the history of professional Japanese team sports.

The Giants and one of the teams that would eventually form the Dragons, then known as the Nagoya Shachihoko, first met on February 5, 1936, at Narumi Baseball Stadium in the suburbs of Nagoya, marking the first ever game in the history of the Japanese Professional Baseball League, which is now known as Nippon Professional Baseball. The Shachihoko, later known as Nagoya Kinko, would be absorbed into the Nagoya Baseball Club in 1943 as their parent company, the Nagoya Shimbun, was forced to merge into rival newspaper company Shin-Aichi Shimbun under the Japanese newspaper control ordinance, creating Chubu-Nippon Shimbun, or Chunichi Shimbun as it is known today. This created the Sangyo Baseball Club, which is now known as today's Chunichi Dragons.

Like the Giants-Tigers rivalry, the Giants have enjoyed long standing success at the expense of the Dragons, creating animosity amongst Dragons fans. This came to a head in the finale of the 1994 NPB season, where the Giants and Dragons were tied in the standings, each sitting at 69-60-0. The Giants would win that game and the Central League pennant by a score of 6-3, in what would be known as the 10.8 Showdown, and eventually would win the 1994 Japan Series over the Seibu Lions.

Since Nagoya Kinko merged into the Nagoya Baseball Club in 1943, the Giants lead the Dragons in Japan Series championships, 22-2, Central League pennants, 39-9, and head-to-head, 1061-871-61. The Giants and Dragons have met in the Climax Series 5 times, in which the overall head-to-head is tied, 12-12-1, including 1 game advantage wins in the 2008, 2009, 2010, and 2012 Central League Climax Series. The Giants also have won the head to head series in the Climax Series 3 times to Chunichi's 2.

== Roster ==
Yomiuri Giants roster
First team		Second team
Pitchers: 21 Kazuyuki Takemaru; 25 Yamato Shiroki; 28 Spencer Howard; 31 Yuji Akahoshi; 41 Kōta Nakagawa; 45 Eito Tanaka; 47 Shunya Morita; 58 Hiromasa Funabasama; 63 Keisuke Izumi; 66 Ryuta Heinai; 91 Kenshin Hotta; 92 Raidel Martínez; 98 Shinnosuke Ogaswara; Catchers: 22 Seiji Kobayashi; 24 Takumi Ohshiro; 67 Shinnosuke Yamase	Infielders: 0 Daiki Masuda; 6 Hayato Sakamoto; 23 Yusei Ishizuka; 29 Bobby Dalbec; 32 Shunsuke Urata; 33 Yuto Kohama; 35 Yuta Izuguchi; Outfielders: 8 Yoshihiro Maru; 9 Go Matsumoto; 13 Trey Cabbage; 44 Shunsuke Sasaki; 94 Taisei Chinen; 95 Misaki Sasahara; Manager: 83 Shinnosuke Abe; Coaches: 76 Tomohiro Nioka (Head coach); 93 Tetsuya Matsumoto (Hitting); 86 Shigeyuki Furuki (Infield / Baserunning); 81 Toshiya Sugiuchi (Pitching); 88 Kazunari Sanematsu (Battery); 79 Yoshiyuki Kamei (Outfield / Baserunning); 77 Tetsuya Utsumi (Pitching); 74 Yoshinori Murata (Strategy / Bullpen)	Pitchers: 11 Masahiro Tanaka; 15 Taisei; 17 Yuhi Nishidate; 19 Iori Yamasaki; 20 Shosei Togo; 26 Forrest Whitley; 30 Ren Tawa; 36 Kyohei Yamashiro; 42 Bryan Mata; 43 Takahiro Norimoto; 46 Teppei Mataki; 48 Elvis Luciano; 49 Alberto Baldonado; 53 Yuhei Takanashi; 54 Keito Matsuura; 56 Ryuji Kitaura; 57 Shunsuke Miyahara; 62 Kai Yokogawa; 64 Ryusei Yamada; 65 Tatsuya Ishikawa; 97 Haruto Inoue; Catchers: 10 Takuya Kai; 27 Yukinori Kishida; 37 Takuya Kōri	Infielders: 00 Dai Yuasa; 2 Naoki Yoshikawa; 5 Makoto Kadowaki; 52 Richard; 60 Yū Aramaki; 61 Riku Masuda; 68 Kisara Utsunomiya; 69 Kota Hirayama; 99 Kento Fujii; Outfielders: 12 Masaya Hagio; 38 Yūki Okada; 39 Gakuto Minagawa; 40 Raito Nakayama; 50 Julian Tima; 51 Shogo Asano; 59 Yamato Suzuki; 96 Rui Mitsuka; Manager: 73 Masumi Kuwata (Second squad); 70 Norihiro Komada (Third squad); Coaches Second squad: 78 Masahiro Kawai (Head coach); 71 Tetsuya Yamaguchi (Pitching); 72 Kan Otake (Pitching); 80 Kenji Yano (Hitting); 85 Ryota Wakiya (Infield); 82 Takahiro Suzuki (Outfield / Baserunning); 87 Itaru Hashimoto (Outfield / Hitting); 89 Ken Katoh (Battery); Third squad: 100 Koichi Misawa (Pitching); 107 Soichiro Tateoka (Infield / Baserunning); 105 Daiki Yoshikawa (Outfield / Baserunning); 104 Ryoma Nogami (Pitching); 103 Tatsuhiko Kinjō (Batter coach); 102 Tomoya Ichikawa (Battery); Patrol Coaches: 84 Yasuo Kubo (Pitching/ Assistant Trainer); 110 Zelous Wheeler (Hitting coordinator)
Development Players
69 Misaki Sasahara; 94 Ryusuke Kita; 98 Yamato Suzuki; 90 Juza Ishida; 99 Makoto Kyomoto; 002 Ayumu Nakata (IF); 004 Gen Murayama (IF); 005 Yuya Tanoue (IF); 008 Hakuto Aizawa (OF); 006 Rentaro Matsui (C); 009 Lee Kun-Hee (C); 011 Eijiro Tomishige (P); 012 Kira Hayashi (P); 014 Shotaro Horie (P); 015 Keishin Suzuki (P); 016 Takahiro Chiba (P); 018 Motoya Kinoshita (P); 019 Atsuki Sonoda (P); 020 Ryusuke Kita (C); 021 Hayate Matsui (P); 022 Keita Kameda (C); 023 Tomoki Tamura (P); 024 Tatsuya Sakamoto (C); 025 Raia Takeshita (IF); 026 Yusefu Yoshimura (P); 027 Rio Kitamura (IF); 028 Ryu Tomida (P); 029 Ayumu Nishikawa (P); 030 Shido Fukita (P); 034 Tessei Morimoto (P); 041 Huang Chin-hao (P); 042 Francis Guzmán (P); 047 Eiji Kamouchi (P); 049 Christían Feliz (OF); 050 Yugo Bandoh (P); 063 Yuki Hanada (P); 067 Jumpei Kawarada (IF); 077 Hayato Ishita (P); 090 Juza Ishida (P); 099 Makoto Kyomoto (P)
Updated August 1, 2026		→ All NPB rosters

== Players of note ==
=== Former players ===
- (United States) Chuck Cary – P
- (United States) Bryan Corey — P
- (United States) Jesse Barfield – OF#
- (United States) Phil Bradley
- (Japan) Shigeru Chiba (千葉 茂)
- (United States) Keith Comstock
- (United States) Warren Cromartie – OF
- (Mexico) Luis Cruz – IF
- (Dominican Republic) Mariano Duncan
- (Japan) Suguru Egawa (江川 卓)
- (Dominican Republic) Balvino Gálvez
- (United States) Dan Gladden
- (United States) Gary Glover – P
- (Venezuela) Luis González – 2B
- (United States) Bill Gullickson – P
- (South Korea) Isao Harimoto (Jang Hun) (張本勲)
- (Japan) Tatsuro Hirooka (広岡 達郎)
- (Japan) Osamu Mihara (三原 脩)
- (United States) Damon Hollins – OF
- (Japan) Tsuneo Horiuchi (堀内 恒夫)
- (United States) Gabe Kapler – OF, later manager of the San Francisco Giants
- (Japan) Masumi Kuwata (桑田 真澄) – P
- (Japan) Tetsuharu Kawakami (川上 哲治)
- (Japan) Kazuhiro Kiyohara (清原 和博)
- (Japan) Yoshinobu Takahashi (高橋 由伸)
- (Japan) Norihiro Komada (駒田 徳広)
- (United States) Davey Johnson – Manager
- (Dominican Republic) Domingo Martínez
- (United States) Chris Latham
- (United States) Shane Mack
- (Japan) Yukinaga Maeda (前田 幸長) – P
- (Japan) Hiromi Makihara (槙原 寛己)
- (Dominican Republic) Gregory Polanco
- (Japan) Kimiyasu Kudo (工藤 公康)
- (Japan) Hideki Matsui (松井 秀喜)
- (United States) Miles Mikolas – P
- (Canada) Scott Mathieson
- (Australia) Micheal Nakamura (マイケル 中村; MICHAEL)
- (Japan) Shigeo Nagashima (長嶋 茂雄)
- (Japan) Kiyoshi Nakahata (中畑 清)
- (Japan) Hiromitsu Ochiai (落合 博満)
- (Taiwan) Sadaharu Oh (王貞治)
- (Japan) Sho Nakata (中田 翔)
- (Japan) Hideki Okajima (岡島 秀樹)
- (Venezuela) Roberto Petagine
- (United States) Jeremy Powell
- (United States) Tuffy Rhodes
- (Japan) Masaki Saito (斎藤 雅樹)
- (Japan) Eiji Sawamura (沢村 栄治)
- (Japan) Hirokazu Sawamura (澤村 拓一)
- (Japan) Isao Shibata (柴田 勲)
- (Japan) Kazunori Shinozuka (篠塚 和典)
- (United States) Reggie Smith
- (Russia) Victor Starffin
- (Japan) Kazumi Takahashi (高橋 一三)
- (Japan) Shigeru Takada (高田 繫)
- (Japan) Yukinobu Kuroe (黒江 透修)
- (Japan) Koji Uehara (上原 浩治)
- (United States) John Wasdin
- (United States) Roy White
- (United States) Clyde Wright
- (United States) Wally Yonamine (与那嶺 要)
- Shohei Baba (馬場 正平, ジャイアント馬場; pitcher; later a pro wrestler, founder of All Japan Pro Wrestling)
- (South Korea) Lee Seung-Yeop (李承燁)
- (Venezuela) Alex Ramírez
- (Japan) Haruyasu Nakajima (中島 治康)
- (United States) Foster Griffin
- (Dominican Republic) C. C. Mercedes
- (Japan) Shinnosuke Abe (阿部 慎之助)

=== Retired numbers ===
- 1 (Taiwan) Sadaharu Oh (王貞治)
- 3 (Japan) Shigeo Nagashima (長嶋 茂雄)
- 4 (Japan) Toshio Kurosawa (黒沢 俊夫)
- 14 (Japan) Eiji Sawamura (沢村 栄治)
- 16 (Japan) Tetsuharu Kawakami (川上 哲治)
- 34 (Japan) Masaichi Kaneda (金田 正一)

== Top starting pitchers ==
Player	Years	Games	Win	Defeat	Save	Innings Pitched	Strikeout	ERA
Takehiko Bessho	1949–1961	476	221	102	0	2925 2/3	1372	2.20
Teruzo Nakao	1939–1957	516	209	127	0	3057	1597	2.48
Tsuneo Horiuchi	1966–1983	560	203	139	6	3045	1865	3.27
Victor Starffin	1936–1944	311	199	61	0	2245	1225	1.37
Hideo Fujimoto	1942–1946 1948–1955	332	183	72	0	2353 2/3	1100	1.90
Masaki Saito	1983–2001	426	180	96	11	2375 2/3	1707	2.77
Masumi Kuwata	1986–2006	442	173	141	14	2761 2/3	1980	3.53
Hiromi Makihara	1982–2001	463	159	108	56	2485	2111	3.19
Kunio Jonouchi	1962–1971	354	141	88	0	1966 2/3	927	2.56
Suguru Egawa	1979–1987	266	135	72	3	1857 1/3	1366	3.02

Sourse:Nippon Professional Baseball League (NPB)

== Top hitters ==
Player	Years	Games	At-bats	Hits	Home runs	RBI	Stolen bases	Strikeouts	Batting average
Sadaharu Oh	1959–1980	2831	9250	2786	868	2170	84	1319	.301
Shigeo Nagashima	1958–1974	2186	8094	2471	444	1522	190	729	.305
Tetsuharu Kawakami	1938–1955	1979	7500	2351	181	1319	220	422	.313
Hayato Sakamoto	2008–ongoing	2275	8541	2448	298	1060	163	1512	.287
Shinnosuke Abe	2001–2019	2282	7514	2132	406	1285	13	1306	.284
Isao Shibata	1962–1981	2208	7570	2018	194	708	579	1087	.267
Yoshinobu Takahashi	1998–2015	1819	6028	1753	321	986	29	1173	.291
Kazunori Shinozuka	1976–1994	1651	5372	1696	92	628	55	580	.309
Tatsunori Hara	1981–1995	1697	6012	1675	382	1093	82	899	.279
Shigeru Chiba	1938–1956	1512	5645	1605	96	691	155	575	.284

Source: Baseball Reference

== All-time home run leaders ==
Rank	Player	Homeruns	Years
1	Sadaharu Oh	868	1959–1980
2	Shigeo Nagashima	444	1958–1974
3	Shinnosuke Abe	406	2001–2019
4	Tatsunori Hara	382	1981–1995
5	Hideki Matsui	332	1993–2002
6	Yoshinobu Takahashi	321	1998–2015
7	Hayato Sakamoto	298	2008–ongoing
8	Kazuma Okamoto	277	2015-2025
9	Isao Shibata	194	1962–1981
10	Kazuhiro Kiyohara	185	1997–2005

Source: Baseball Reference

== Season-by-season record ==
Note: GP = Games played, W = Wins, L = Losses, T = Ties, % = Win Percentage

Season	GP	W	L	T	%	Finish	Playoffs
2017	143	72	68	3	.514	4th, Central	Did not qualify
2018	143	67	71	5	.486	3rd, Central	Lost in League Final Stage, 0–4 (Carp)
2019	143	77	64	2	.546	1st, Central	Lost in Japan Series, 0–4 (Hawks)
2020	120	67	45	8	.598	1st, Central	Lost in Japan Series, 0–4 (Hawks)
2021	143	61	62	20	.496	3rd, Central	Lost in League Final Stage, 0–3 (Swallows)
2022	143	68	72	3	.514	4th, Central	Did not qualify
2023	143	71	70	2	.504	4th, Central	Did not qualify

== "Japan's team" and allegations of corruption ==
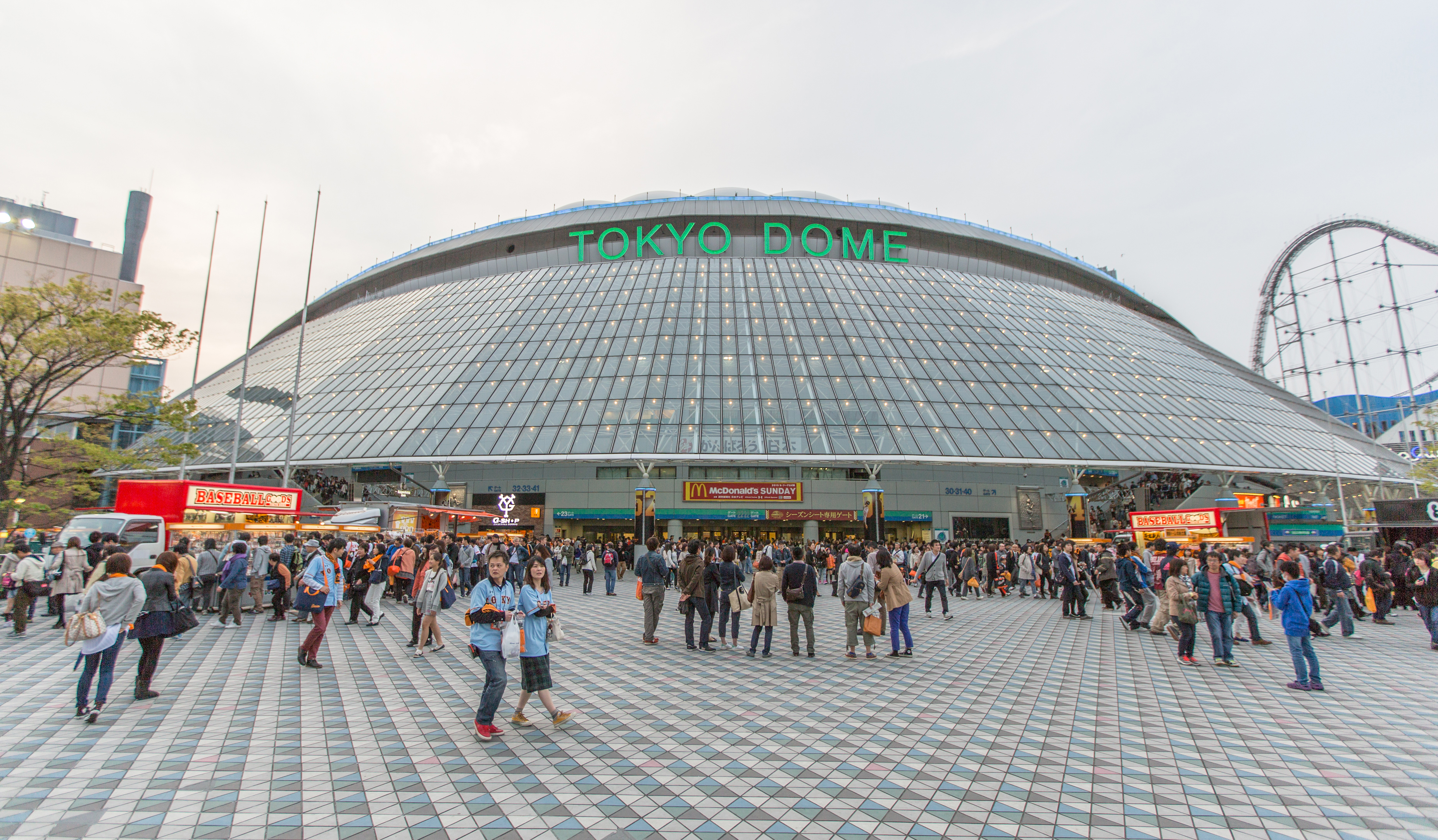
Tokyo Dome is the Giants' home field since 1988

Due to the Yomiuri company's vast influence in Japan as a major media conglomerate, the Giants have long been branded as "Japan's Team". In fact, for some years the Giants' uniforms had "Tokyo" on the jersey instead of "Yomiuri" or "Giants", seeming to imply that the Giants represent the vast metropolis and geopolitical center of Japan, even though the Yakult Swallows are also based in Tokyo and three other teams play in the Greater Tokyo Area. This bandwagon appeal has been compared with the marketability of the New York Yankees, Real Madrid, and Manchester United, except that support for the Giants nearly exceeds 50% of those polled, while in the United States and England, support is judged to be between 30% and 40% for the Yankees and Manchester United, respectively. Correspondingly, fans of other professional baseball teams in Japan are often openly derisive and contemptuous of the Giants' bandwagon marketing tactics, and an "anti-Giants" movement exists in protest of the Giants' near-hegemony.

In addition, despite the Giants having employed foreign players over the years, some Japanese point to the "pure-blooded period" of 1958–1974 when the team enjoyed success — 13 pennants — despite having no foreign players.

It has also long been alleged that the Giants rely on underhanded tactics to recruit the best players, involving bribes to players and amateur coaches, or using their influence on the governing council of Japanese professional baseball to pass rules that favors their recruiting efforts. This may be one explanation for the Giants' abundance of success in league play. In August 2004, Yomiuri president Tsuneo Watanabe resigned after it was revealed that the club had violated scouting rules by paying ¥2 million to pitching prospect Yasuhiro Ichiba. Ten months later, Watanabe was hired as chairman of the Yomiuri corporation. In 2012, Asahi Shimbun discovered that the Giants had violated NPB rules by secretly paying pitcher Takahiko Nomaguchi while he was still an amateur playing in Japan's corporate league.

In 2009, the Giants played the Japan national baseball team in an unofficial goodwill game before the World Baseball Classic.

== Controversies ==
=== 1973 first nine consecutive victories in professional baseball history ===
As of October 21 before this game was played, the teams only had a 0.5 game difference the Hanshin Tigers, this game resulted 9 to 0 win over Tigers on October 22, infielder Shozo Doi and catcher Masaaki Mori each had 3 hits and Doi hit a two run homerun in the fifth inning off Kenji Furusawa in the Giants 4 to 1 win from Nankai Hawks (now Fukuoka SoftBank Hawks) in Japan Series, starter Kazumi Takahashi (23 wins, 13 losses) contribution this season.

=== Oh home run controversy ===
In 1985, American Randy Bass, playing for the Hanshin Tigers, came into the last game of the season against the Oh-managed Giants with 54 home runs, one short of manager Sadaharu Oh's single-season record of 55. Bass was intentionally walked four times on four straight pitches each time, leading Bass to famously hold his bat upside down. Bass reached over the plate on the fifth occasion and batted the ball into the outfield for a single. After the game, Oh denied ordering his pitchers to walk Bass, but Keith Comstock, an American pitcher for the Giants, later stated that an unnamed Giants coach had threatened a fine of $1,000 for every strike that any Giants pitcher threw to Bass. The magazine Takarajima investigated the incident and reported that the Giants front office had likely ordered the team not to allow Bass an opportunity to tie or break Oh's record. For the most part the Japanese media remained silent on the incident as did league commissioner Takeso Shimoda. A similar situation to this was presented in the 1992 movie Mr. Baseball.

=== 1994 Central League tie-breaker game ===
With the Giants and Chunichi Dragons tied 69-60 after 129 games, and the makeup for the 129th game, originally scheduled for September 27, was postponed to September 29 by rain (the 130th scheduled game was played September 28 as planned), and it again was not played because of rain, the final game of the regular season was rescheduled for October 8, 1994. The winner advances to the Japan Series, with Chunichi having the advantage in case the game ends in a tie, Chunichi would advance by rule (the previous year's better record). The Giants won 6 to 3 against Chunichi, and took the Central League pennant and advanced to the Japan Series.

=== 1996 Nagashima controversy ===
The team recorded nine consecutive hits in one inning during a July 9 game against the Hiroshima Carp, tying a professional baseball record. Starting pitchers, Masaki Saito, Dominican Balvino Galvez each won 16 won games during the season, while relief pitchers, Mario Brito and Hirofumi Kono contributed to the pitching staff. Hideki Matsui performed well during the season, and rookies Toshihisa Nishi and Takayuki Shimizu also contributed. The team finished with an 11.5-game lead, the largest in league history at the time, and won the league championship. The team later lost the Japan Series to the Orix BlueWave (now Orix Buffaloes) in five games.

=== 2008 miracle season ===
Despite losing five consecutive games from the opening game on March 28, On May 26, a banned drug was detected to be used by Luis Gonzalez, so he was suspended for 1 year from Nippon Professional Baseball for violating league anti-doping policies, and on the following day, the Giants decided to release Gonzalez from his contract. At the time, October reached the biggest 13 game (as July) difference in league history and accomplished the league championship, from September 19, including their 3rd consecutive victory against the Hanshin Tigers, they recorded a total of 12 consecutive victories for the first time in 32 years, followed by 3 to 1 winning the final direct confrontation on October 8. Contributors included Shinnosuke Abe, Yoshinobu Takahashi, Michihiro Ogasawara, Alex Ramirez, Seth Adam Greisinger, Marc Jason Kroon, Hisanori Takahashi, and Tetsuya Utsumi, The Giants, however, lost 3 games to 4 to the Saitama Seibu Lions in the 2008 Japan Series. The Yomiuri Giants drew an average home attendance of 39,948 in 2008.

=== 2011 Kiyotake controversy ===
On 18 November 2011, Giants' general manager Hidetoshi Kiyotake was fired by the Yomiuri organization for "defamation of the team and Yomiuri newspaper group". Kiyotake had recommended that Kaoru Okazaki be retained as the team's 2012 head coach. After Yomiuri chairman Tsuneo Watanabe ordered Kiyotake to replace Okazaki with Suguru Egawa, Kiyotake called a public press conference on 11 November 2011 alleging interferences by Watanabe's in the club's decision-making processes. In response Yomiuri dismissed Kiyotake.

Okazaki was eventually selected to remain as the next season's coach. The story made major headlines in the Japanese media. On 13 December 2011, Kiyotake sued Yomiuri for ¥62 million for unfair dismissal and defamation and demanded that the company issue him a formal apology, printed in the Yomiuri Shimbun. Yomiuri counter-sued Kiyotake for ¥100 million, saying that he had damaged the team's image. The suits, combined into one case, opened in Tokyo District Court on 2 February 2012.

=== 2012 Hara controversy ===
In 2012, Japanese weekly Shukan Bunshun reported that current team manager Tatsunori Hara had paid ¥100 million to a former yakuza gangster in response to a threat to go public on an extra-marital affair that Hara had been involved in. The Yomiuri corporation admitted that the payout had been made, but sued Shukan Bunshun for insinuating that the incident had underworld connections. The suit is pending.

=== 2015 gambling controversy ===
In 2015, an investigation by the league found that three Giants pitchers: Shoki Kasahara, Ryuya Matsumoto, and Satoshi Fukuda had bet on NPB and other sporting events with underworld bookmakers. The Giants claimed that the three did not bet on Giants games. Placing wagers on baseball games or associating with criminal elements is expressly prohibited in the contracts that all NPB players must sign, a rule similar to Major League Baseball's Rule 21 in North America, intended to prevent a repeat of the Black Sox Scandal of 1919 in Chicago, Illinois, USA. On 9 November 2015, the Giants organization terminated the contracts of all three players, with an indefinite suspension from all World Baseball Softball Confederation leagues on the players. The offending players must be reinstated by the WBSC before they can participate in any league.

== MLB players ==
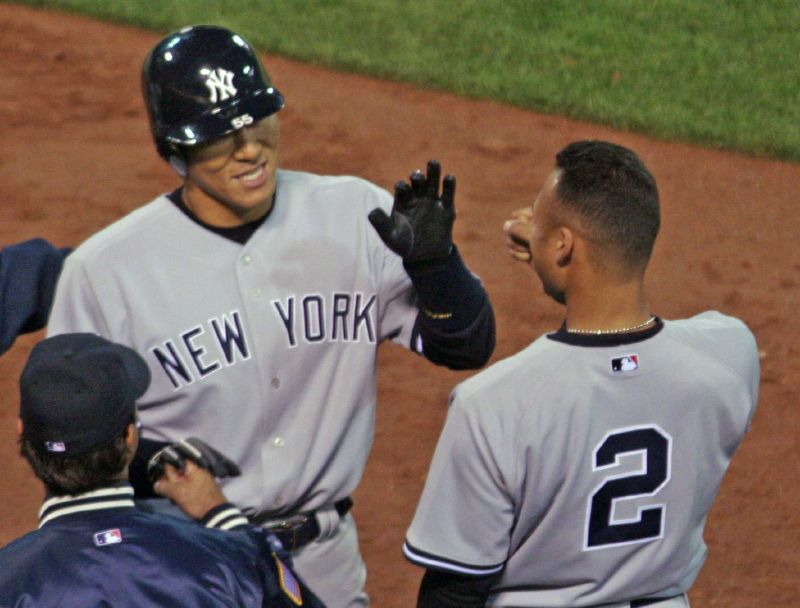
Hideki Matsui

Active

- Miles Mikolas (2015–2017)
- Matt Andriese (2022)
- Forrest Whitley (2024–present)
- Tomoyuki Sugano (2025–present)
- Kazuma Okamoto (2026–present)
- Foster Griffin (2026–present)

Retired

- Takashi Kashiwada (1998)
- Takahito Nomura (2002)
- Joe Dillon (2007)
- Masumi Kuwata (2007)
- Ken Kadokura (2009)
- Hideki Matsui (2003–2012)
- Hideki Okajima (2007–2011, 2013)
- Hisanori Takahashi (2010–2013)
- Koji Uehara (2009–2017)
- Taylor Jungmann (2015–2017)
- Gerardo Parra (2020)
- Eric Thames (2021)
- Justin Smoak (2021)

== Mascots ==
The Giants have 6 mascots, known as the Giabbits. They are based on one of the older logos of the Giants. They have 2 adult male mascots named Giabyi and Giabba (their jersey numbers are 333 and 555 respectively), an adult female mascot named Vicky, and 2 children mascots (a boy and a girl respectively), Tsuppy and Chappy (the former wears shorts and the latter wears a skirt and a headband on their left ear). The most recent one, Grandpa Giabbit, was introduced in 2014, the team's 80th anniversary. His jersey number is 1934, the year the team was founded.

== Minor League team ==
The Giants farm team plays in the Eastern League. It was founded in 1949.
