= Motonobu Tanishige =

Japanese baseball player and manager (born 1970)

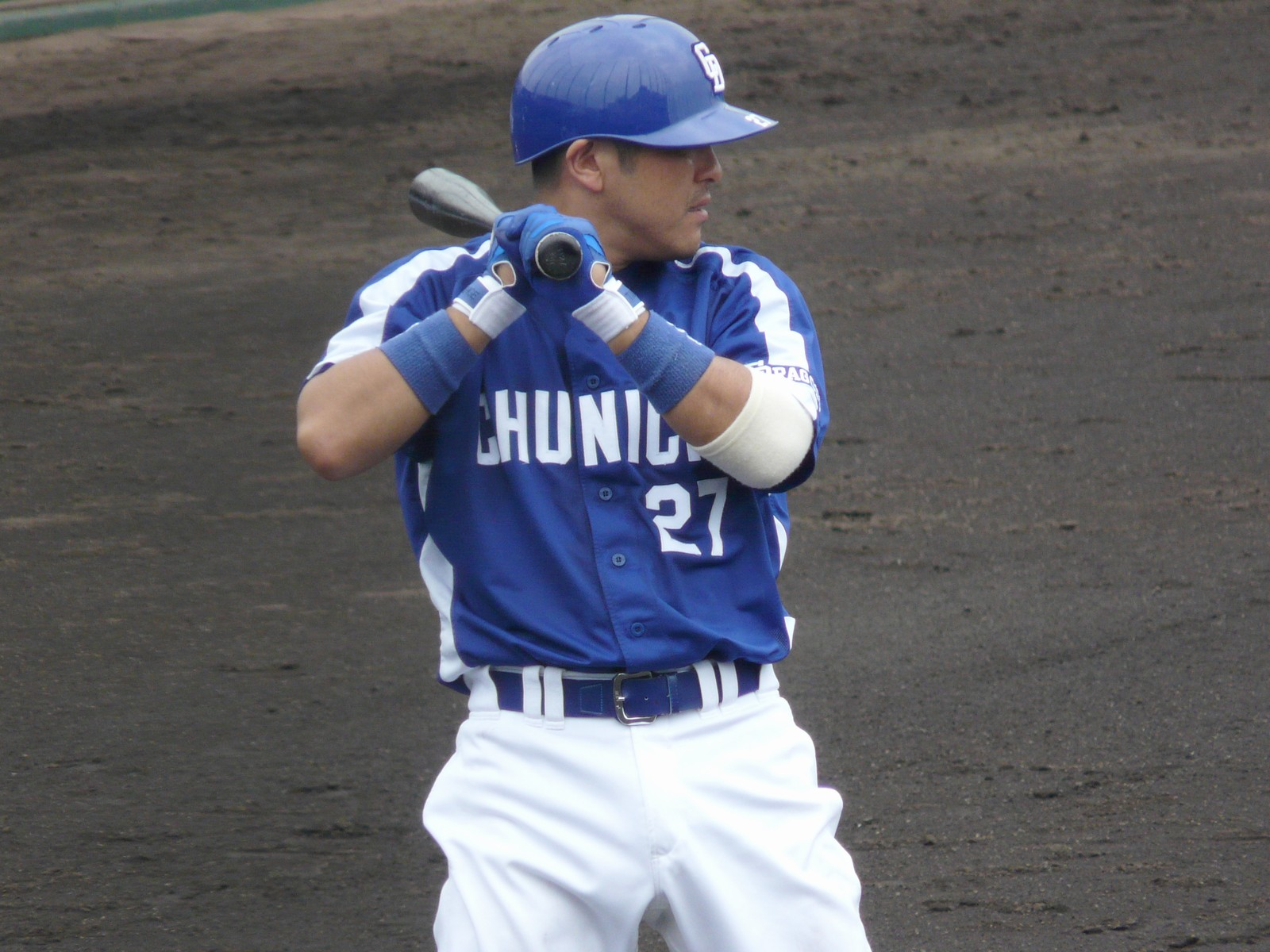
- Tanishige with the Chunichi Dragons
- Catcher / Manager
- Born: December 21, 1970 (age 55)
- Batted: Right Threw: Right

NPB debut
- April 11, 1989, for the Yokohama Taiyo Whales

Last NPB appearance
- September 26, 2015, for the Chunichi Dragons

NPB statistics
- Batting average: .240
- Home runs: 229
- Hits: 2,108
- Runs batted in: 1,040
- Stats at Baseball Reference

Teams
- As player: Yokohama Taiyo Whales/Yokohama BayStars (1989–2001); Chunichi Dragons (2002–2015); As manager: Chunichi Dragons (2014–2016)

Career highlights and awards
- 2x Japan Series Champion (1998, 2007); 5x Central League Champion (1998, 2004, 2006, 2010, 2011); 12x NPB All Star (1993, 1997-2002, 2005, 2012-2014); Best Nine (1998); 6x Golden Glove (1998, 2006-2007, 2009, 2011-2012); Oldest player to appears in All-Star game (43 years 6 months); NPB All-Time Appearance record (3021); NPB Most consecutive seasons with a hit (27 years); NPB Most consecutive seasons with a home run (27 years)

Member of the Japanese

Baseball Hall of Fame
- Induction: 2024
Medals
Representing Japan
Men's baseball
World Baseball Classic
Gold medal – first place	2006 San Diego	Team

Motonobu Tanishige (Japanese: 谷繁 元信, born December 21, 1970, in Hiroshima) is a retired Japanese professional baseball player and manager.

Tanishige played 27 seasons in Nippon Professional Baseball (NPB), appearing in more games (3,021) than any other player in NPB history. Making his debut for the Taiyo Whales in 1989 at age 18, he played for the franchise for 13 years. In 2002, he moved to the Chunichi Dragons, where he played for 14 seasons, until 2015. He was the player-manager of the Chunichi Dragons from 2014 to 2015, staying on as manager in 2016.

Tanishige played in five Japan Series. He played in the 2006 World Baseball Classic, when Japan won the championship. In 2024, he was inducted into the Japanese Baseball Hall of Fame.

== Professional career ==
Tanishige performed well in the 2004 Japan Series (in which the Dragons lost 4-games-to-3 to the Seibu Lions), including hitting his first career grand slam.

In 2015, Tanishige broke the NPB record for games played, passing Katsuya Nomura with 3,018 — he later extended the record. Tanishige is second on the career strikeout list with 1,838. With more than 200 career home runs, Tanshige is a member of the Meikyukai hall of fame.

== Managerial career ==
After retiring from playing at the end of the 2015 season, Tanishige became full-time manager of the Dragons. After a rocky start to the season followed by a lacklustre continuation following the All-Star break, on August 10, 2016, he was relieved from his duties alongside fielding coach Takahiro Saeki. He was replaced by head coach, Shigekazu Mori for the remainder of the season.

== See also ==
- List of Nippon Professional Baseball players with 1,000 runs batted in
- List of Nippon Professional Baseball career hits leaders
