= Tsuyoshi Yoda =

Japanese baseball player and manager

Tsuyoshi Yoda 与田 剛
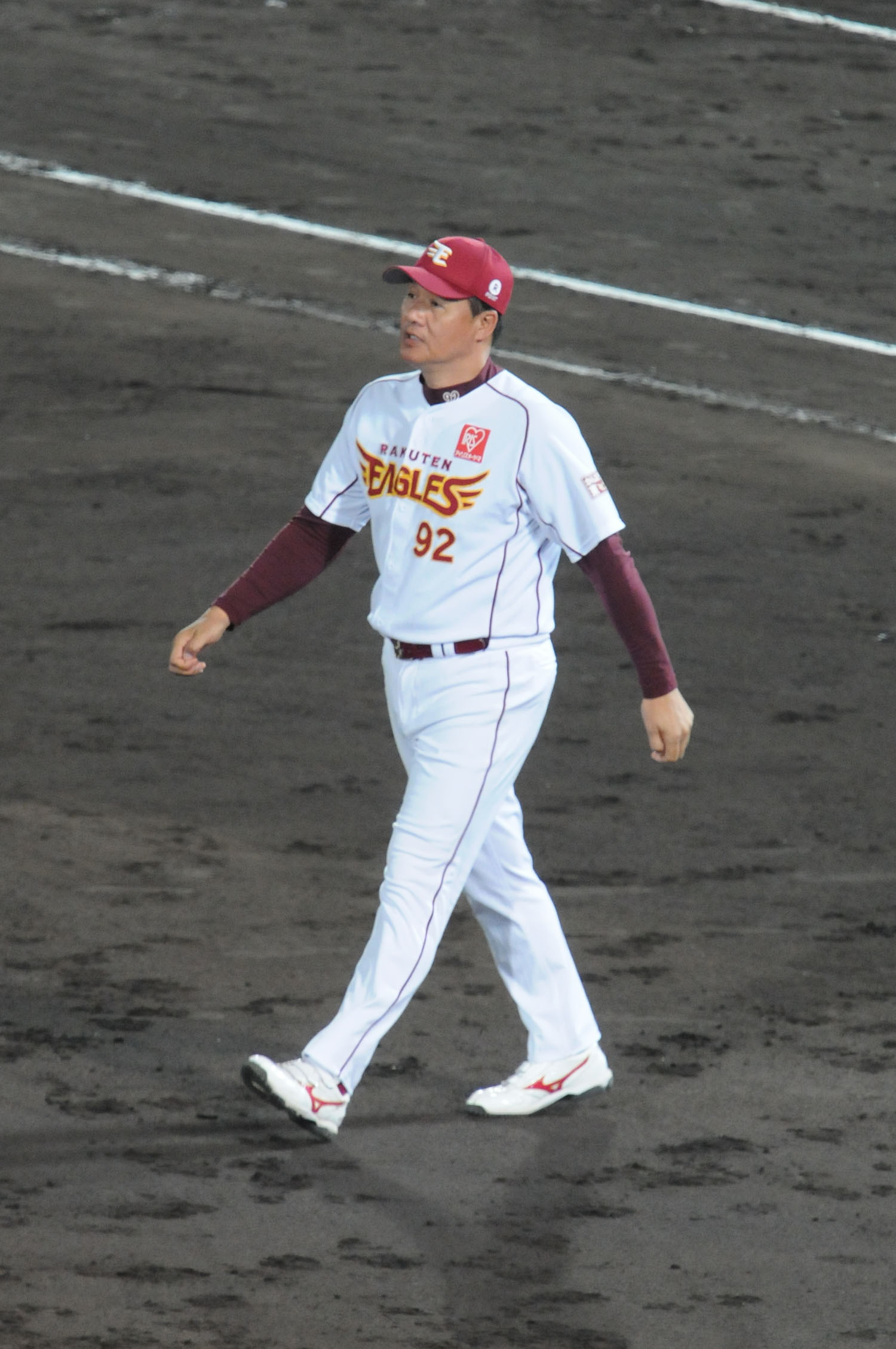
- Pitcher / Manager
- Born: December 4, 1965 (age 60); Kitakyushu, Fukuoka, Japan
- Batted: Right Threw: Right

NPB debut
- April 7, 1990, for the Chunichi Dragons

Last appearance
- October 2, 1999, for the Nippon-Ham Fighters

NPB statistics (through 2000)
- Win–loss record: 8-19
- Saves: 59
- ERA: 4.58
- Strikeouts: 212
- Stats at Baseball Reference

Teams
- As player: Chunichi Dragons (1990–1996); Chiba Lotte Marines (1996–1997); Nippon-Ham Fighters (1998–1999); Hanshin Tigers (2000); As coach: Tohoku Rakuten Golden Eagles (2016–2018); As Manager: Chunichi Dragons (2019–2021)

Career highlights and awards
- 1990 CL Rookie of the Year; 2× NPB All-Star selection (1990, 1992)
- Last updated on: 25 February 2020

Tsuyoshi Yoda (与田 剛, Yoda Tsuyoshi; born December 4, 1965 in Kitakyushu, Fukuoka, Japan) is a Japanese professional baseball player and manager. He managed of the Chunichi Dragons in Nippon Professional Baseball (NPB) between 2019 and 2021.

Although born in Fukuoka prefecture, Yoda grew up in Kimitsu, Chiba Prefecture. His wife is Tokyo Broadcasting System Television announcer, Hiroko Kiba.

== Early career ==
He is the son of Kenji and Atsuko Yoda. He has two siblings, Kozue and Kaori. Yoda attended Kisarazu Chuo High School (now Kisarazu Sōgō High School) in Chiba Prefecture before entering Asia University. Yoda was troubled with injuries during much of his time in college, caused by blood flow issues from throwing too much during high school. However, as a member of NTT East in the industrial leagues, Yoda's 150 km/h fastball caught the eye of national team selectors as well as professional scouts.

At the 1989 NPB Draft, Yoda was selected in the first round by the Chunichi Dragons after showing a preference for a non-Tokyo team. Yoda signed on a provisional contract with a ¥75,000,000 sign-on bonus and a ¥7,200,000 yearly salary.

== Professional career ==
Yoda's first appearance came in on April 7, 1990 against the Yokohama Taiyo Whales on opening day. In the 11th inning with one out and runners on 1st and 3rd, he threw two strikeouts to close out his inning. From that point on Yoda was made full-time closer by manager Senichi Hoshino and on June 1 passed double-digit saves. Yoda received the fan vote to appear in the 1990 All-Star game going on to claim 31 saves as well as claiming Rookie of the Year and Most valuable reliever awards. On 15 August at Hiroshima Municipal Stadium, Yoda threw a 157 km/h fastball, which was at the time a Japanese record. After the 1990 season, Yoda played on a team of Japanese all-stars, opposing American all-stars.

While continuing as a reliever, Yoda had shoulder and elbow issues and was unable to leave behind any notable results after only 4 years of service. Halfway through the 1996 season, Yoda was traded to the Chiba Lotte Marines for Naoyuki Naitō and in the same year enjoyed a study abroad with the Memphis Chicks of the Class AA Southern League. However, elbow injuries limited him. On return to the Marines, Yoda failed to make any first-team appearances and was released in the 1997 off-season.

He signed for the Nippon-Ham Fighters in 1998 via a try-out. The Fighters without a full-time closer had hoped Yoda would make the team, but he ended the season failing to make an appearance for either the top or farm team. However, due to pitching well in the fall development league he stayed with the team for a further year. On 2 October 1999, Yoda made his first pitching appearance in 4 years but was released at the end of the year.

The Hanshin Tigers would give Yoda another chance to revive his career in 2000 with then manager Katsuya Nomura mentioning in spring training that he was among the shortlist for closer. After pitching well in a pre-season game, Yoda was unable to get out of bed the following day following lumbar pain. Unable to fully recover, Yoda pitched in two farm games before eventually being released in the fall.

== Post-playing career ==
=== NHK Analyst and national team coaching ===
From 2001 to 2015, Yoda served as a color analyst for NHK baseball broadcasts. During this time, Yoda was also a columnist for Tokyo Chunichi Sports Shimbun as well as serving as a pitching coach for the Japan women's national baseball team and club team, Thousand Leaf Ichihara.

Yoda served as a coach for the Japanese national baseball team in the 2009 and 2013 World Baseball Classic.

=== Tohoku Rakuten Golden Eagles ===
On 13 October 2015, Yoda was appointed as pitching coach of the Tohoku Rakuten Golden Eagles. In the off-season of the same year, Yoda was listed alongside Kazuyoshi Tatsunami, Takeshi Yamasaki, Hideki Hashigami, Kazuhiro Sasaki and Takashi Saito to take over as Rakuten manager. Masataka Nashida however would be the successful candidate.

From 2018, Yoda was demoted to work with the Rakuten farm pitchers and at the end of the season was released.

=== Chunichi Dragons ===
On the 17th of October 2018, Yoda was instated as the new manager of his former club the Chunichi Dragons. After 3 seasons in charge, it was confirmed on the 12th of October that Yoda would be stepping down as manager at the end of the 2021 NPB season.

== Personal life ==
Yoda's shoulder breadth has been somewhat of a topic since his playing days and has been measured at 60 cm. Major leaguer, Yu Darvish who is 10 cm taller than Yoda has been reported as saying "what's going on with those shoulders?"

On Yoda's aforementioned debut with the Taiyo Whales, there was a cross-play involving Whales player Yoshiyuki Shimizu tackling then Dragons catcher, Takeshi Nakamura which almost lead to a brawl. Later on 22 June 1994, after striking Whales outfielder, Glenn Braggs, Yoda failed to tip his hat leading to Braggs charging the mound. Yoda and Braggs were ejected from the game after the following a bench-clearing brawl.

Yoda hates the words "gambare" (do your best) and "doryoku" (determination), preferring the word junbi (preparation). After becoming Dragons manager, Yoda declared that he would use "player that are best prepared" and that he has explained "the importance of preparation before a game".
